= 2026 All-Ireland Senior Hurling Championship final =

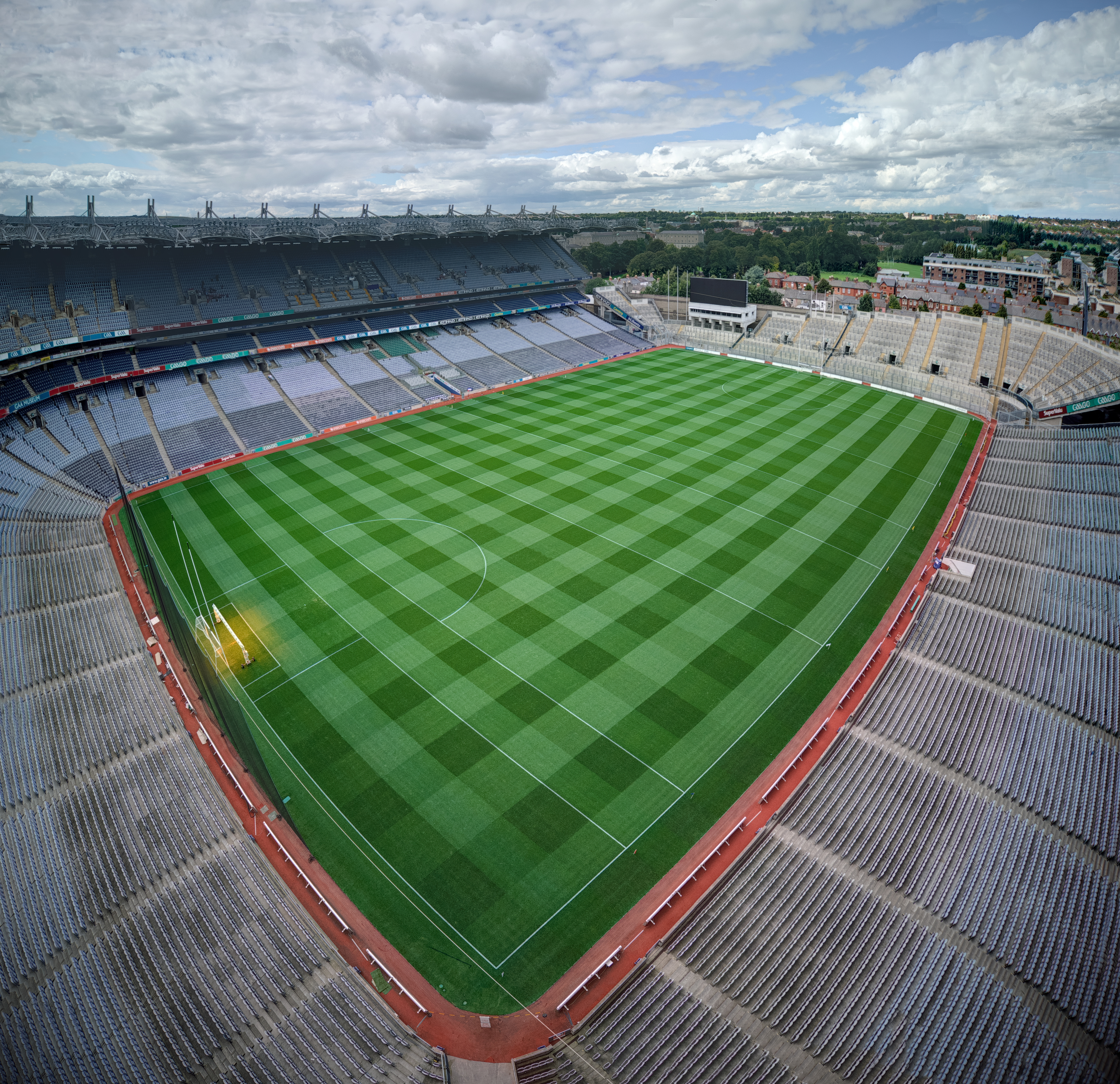
- Event: 2026 All-Ireland Senior Hurling Championship
Galway	Limerick
1–18 (21)	1–29 (32)
- Date: 19 July 2026
- Venue: Croke Park, Dublin
- Man of the Match: Cathal O'Neill
- Referee: Colm Lyons (Cork)
- Weather: 21 °C (70 °F), sunny

The 2026 All-Ireland Senior Hurling Championship final was a hurling match played at Croke Park in Dublin on 19 July 2026 between Galway and Limerick, the culmination of the 2026 All-Ireland Senior Hurling Championship. It was the 139th final of that sport's primary competition, the All-Ireland Senior Hurling Championship.

Limerick won the match on a scoreline of 1–29 to 1–18, it was their sixth All-Ireland title since 2018.

The match was televised nationally on RTÉ2 as part of The Sunday Game live programme, presented by Joanne Cantwell from the Croke Park pitch with analysis by Joe Canning, Dónal Óg Cusack and Liam Sheedy. Commentary on the game was provided by Marty Morrissey alongside Michael Duignan. The game was also televised on BBC Two, and streamed on iPlayer and GAA+.

== Background ==
- Limerick were aiming to win their 13th All-Ireland title, and their first since 2023; they had been the dominant team in hurling in recent years, with All-Irelands in 2018, 2020, 2021, 2022 and 2023 and National Hurling League wins in 2019, 2020, 2023 and 2026.
- Galway were aiming to win their 6th All-Ireland title and their first since 2017.
- The fourth meeting of Galway and Limerick in the final. Limerick won in the 2018 final, while Galway were the winners when the two counties met in 1923 and 1980.

== Paths to the final ==
Galway
Round	Date	Opponent	Venue (H/A/N)	Result	Victory margin	Score	Ref
Leinster SHC round robin	18 April 2026	Kilkenny	Pearse Stadium (H)	Win	15	3–25 to 1–16	
Leinster SHC round robin	26 April 2026	Offaly	Pearse Stadium (H)	Win	11	2–26 to 1–18	
Leinster SHC round robin	9 May 2026	Kildare	St Conleth's Park (A)	Win	9	4–22 to 1–22	
Leinster SHC round robin	16 May 2026	Dublin	Pearse Stadium (H)	Loss	–3	0–21 to 3–15	
Leinster SHC round robin	24 May 2026	Wexford	Wexford Park (A)	Win	8	2–31 to 3–20	
Leinster SHC final	6 June 2026	Dublin	Croke Park (N)	Win	14	4–29 to 4–15	
All-Ireland SHC semi-final	4 July 2026	Cork	Croke Park (N)	Win	11	2–26 to 1–18	

Limerick
Round	Date	Opponent	Venue (H/A/N)	Result	Victory margin	Score	Ref
Munster SHC round robin	26 April 2026	Cork	Páirc Uí Chaoimh (A)	Loss	–2	1–23 to 2–22	
Munster SHC round robin	3 May 2026	Clare	Cusack Park, Ennis (A)	Win	15	2–30 to 1–18	
Munster SHC round robin	17 May 2026	Waterford	Gaelic Grounds (H)	Win	9	2–29 to 2–20	
Munster SHC round robin	24 May 2026	Tipperary	Gaelic Grounds (H)	Win	17	5–27 to 0–25	
Munster SHC final	7 June 2026	Cork	Páirc Uí Chaoimh (A)	Win	1	1–21 to 2–17	
All-Ireland SHC semi-final	5 July 2026	Clare	Croke Park (N)	Win	2	1–21 to 1–19	

== Pre-match ==
=== Tickets ===
Tickets for the match sold-out and were distributed by the clubs with no public sale and priced at €100 for the stands and €55 for the terrace.

=== Officials ===
On 8 July, the GAA named Cork's Colm Lyons from Nemo Rangers as the referee for the final, his second All-Ireland SHC decider, he previously refereed the 2022 final. It was his 39th All-Ireland Championship game to referee since his first in 2012. His umpires were Ciarán Hanley, Jim McEvoy, Philip Mackey and Finian Mullane. Line umpires were Wexford’s James Owens and Dublin’s Chris Mooney. James Owens was also the standby referee, and the sideline official was Niall Malone from Clare. David Grogan from Tipperary was the Hawk-Eye official.

=== Jubilee team ===
The Tipperary team that won the 2001 All-Ireland SHC final was presented to the crowd before the match, on the silver jubilee.

=== Team news ===
For Limerick, captain Cian Lynch was recalled to the starting team in midfield, with Darragh O'Donovan dropping out. Mike Casey also started at full-back. The Galway team announced was unchanged from the semi-final win against Cork.

== Match ==
=== Details ===
RTÉ2
BBC Two
GAA+

19 July 2026
15:30 IST (UTC+1)
Final

Report

Galway	1–18 (21) – (32) 1–29	Limerick
(HT: 0-8 – 0-13)
Gls: Conor Cooney 1(pen); Pts: Aaron Niland 10 (8fs, 1 '65'), Conor Cooney 2 (1f), Thomas Monaghan 2, Cathal Mannion 1, Darragh Neary 1, Jason Rabbitte 1, Colm Molloy 1		Gls: Cathal O’Neill 1 Pts: Aidan O’Connor 5 (3fs), Cathal O’Neill 4, Aaron Gillane 4, Peter Casey 4, Diarmaid Byrnes 4 (2fs, 1 '65'), Kyle Hayes 2, Adam English 2, Cian Lynch 2, Barry Nash 1, David Reidy 1

Croke Park, Dublin
Referee: Colm Lyons (Cork)
Attendance: 82,300
Standby: James Owens (Wexford)
Linesman: Chros Mooney (Dublin)
Sideline: Niall Malone (Clare)
Umpires: Ciarán Hanley (Brian Dillons), Jim McEvoy (Blarney), Philip Mackey & Finian Mullane (Nemo Rangers)

Galway	Limerick

GK	1	Darach Fahy
FB	2	Joshua Ryan
FB	3	Cillian Trayers
FB	4	Darren Morrissey (c)
HB	5	Pádraic Mannion	(yellow card) 14'
HB	6	Daithí Burke
HB	7	Ronan Glennon	(red card) 59'
MF	8	Tiernan Killeen		(substituted off) 60'
MF	9	Gavin Lee		(substituted off) 47'
HF	10	Tom Monaghan		(substituted off) 55'
HF	11	Cathal Mannion		(substituted off) 70+1'
HF	12	Darragh Neary
FF	13	Conor Whelan
FF	14	Jason Rabbitte
FF	15	Aaron Niland		(substituted off) 60'
Substitutes:
	16	Éanna Murphy
	17	Shane Morgan
	18	Fintan Burke
	19	Cian Daniels		(substituted on) 55'
	20	Cianan Fahy
	21	Conor Cooney		(substituted on) 47'
	22	John Fleming		(substituted on) 60'
	23	Seán Linnane		(substituted on) 70+1'
	24	Cillian Whelan
	25	Colm Molloy		(substituted on) 60'
	26	Declan McLaughlin
Manager:
Micheál Donoghue

GK	1	Nickie Quaid
FB	2	Seán Finn		(substituted off) 70'
FB	3	Mike Casey	(yellow card) 11'	(substituted off) 53'
FB	4	Barry Nash
HB	5	Diarmaid Byrnes
HB	6	William O'Donoghue
HB	7	Kyle Hayes	(yellow card) 26'
MF	8	Adam English	(yellow card) 14'	(substituted off) 63'
MF	9	Cian Lynch (c)
HF	10	Gearóid Hegarty	(yellow card) 46'
HF	11	Aidan O'Connor		(substituted off) 69'
HF	12	Cathal O'Neill
FF	13	Aaron Gillane
FF	14	Shane O'Brien		(substituted off) 48'
FF	15	Peter Casey		57' to 60'
Substitutes:
	16	Colin Ryan
	17	Colin Coughlan		(substituted on) 70'
	18	Fintan Fitzgerald
	19	Matthew Fitzgerald
	20	Hugh Flanagan
	21	Ethan Hurley
	22	Darragh Langan
	23	Dan Morrissey		(substituted on) 53'
	24	Tom Morrissey		(substituted on) 48'
	25	Darragh O'Donovan		(substituted on) 63'
	26	David Reidy		(substituted on) 57'	(substituted off) 60'	(substituted on) 69'
Manager:
John Kiely
