= Calasanctius College =

Secondary school in County Galway, Ireland

Location
- Castle Road; Oranmore, County Galway, H91 K7H2; Ireland; 53.2675°N 8.9332°W

Information
- Type: Voluntary
- Motto: French: Noblesse Oblige (Nobility Obliges)
- Religious affiliations: Roman Catholic; Presentation Sisters (former)
- Established: 1861; 165 years ago
- Principal: Niall Kelly
- Gender: Co-educational
- Age: 12 to 18
- Enrollment: approx. 900 (2026)
- Colours: Green; Red
- Website: calasanctius.ie

Calasanctius College, is a co-educational secondary school, is located on Castle Road in Oranmore in County Galway, Ireland. Founded in 1861, it is under the trusteeship of CEIST. As of 2026, the school had approximately 900 pupils enrolled.

== History ==
On 23 May 1861, four Presentation Sisters from the convent in Galway established a new convent in Oranmore, at the request of Bishop John McEvilly. Their initial convent was known to the locals of Oranmore as 'the Hotel'. Not long after its establishment, an out-building of the convent was converted into an educational facility.

In July 1869, the sisters moved into the parochial house of the then-parish priest, Father R. Quinn, which was purchased by the Presentation Order for the sum of £600. The building of the old National College began in October 1886, and three years later, a new convent was built adjoining the old parochial house.

A hall was built on the convent grounds to provide for home economics classes for girls in the locality in 1916. This became the first secondary college, and was blessed by Bishop Michael Browne on 27 August 1946, on the feast day of St. Joseph Calasanctius.

In 1947, a boarding school for girls was opened, which continued to draw students from the surrounding areas, until the increased demand for places led to the building of a major extension in 1963.

The college became co-educational in 1973, with the college enrolling boys for the first time. This led to the building of a new wing, incorporating a Woodwork room. From 1987 onwards the college no longer catered for boarding students, and the dormitories and refectories were converted into science laboratories and further classrooms.

In 1994, the Presentation Sisters decided to withdraw from the teaching staff, the convent was vacated and a lay college principal appointed. The college remained under the trusteeship of the Presentation Order until 2008, when it was transferred to CEIST.

In 2006, a new modern building was completed, with the official opening by Mary Hanafin, Minister for Education, in October 2007.

The school was included in a pilot for new online admissions system for secondary schools in 2026.

== Curriculum ==
Calasanctius College operates Junior Certificate, Transition Year and Leaving Certificate courses.

== Notable alumni ==
=== Sport ===
- Gearóid McInerney, all-Ireland winning hurler
- Darragh Neary, inter-county hurler for Galway
- Greg Cunningham, former professional footballer for Preston North End and Bristol City; 4 caps for the Republic of Ireland
- Joshua Ryan, inter-county hurler for Galway
- Seán O'Brien, former rugby player for Connacht
- Rory Burke, inter-county hurler for Galway
- Aaron Connolly, footballer for Leyton Orient F.C. and formerly of Brighton & Hove Albion and Hull City; 9 caps for the Republic of Ireland
- Niall Burke, all-Ireland winning hurler

=== Arts and media ===
- Nicola Coughlan, actress best known for Derry Girls
- Owen Colgan, actor and comedian best known for Hardy Bucks

=== Politics ===
- Hildegarde Naughton, Fine Gael TD for Galway West and Minister for Education and Youth
