= Galway county hurling team =

Hurling team

Galway
- Sport: Hurling
- Irish: Gaillimh
- Nickname(s): The Tribesmen
- County board: Galway GAA
- Manager: Micheál Donoghue
- Captain: Darren Morrissey
- Home venue(s): Pearse Stadium, Salthill

Recent competitive record
- Current All-Ireland status: 2026 Runners-up
- Last championship title: 2017
- Current NHL Division: 1A (4th in 2026)
- Last league title: 2021
First colours	Second colours

The Galway county hurling team (/ˈɡɔːlweɪ/ GAWL-way) represents Galway in hurling and is governed by Galway GAA, the county board of the Gaelic Athletic Association.

The team currently competes in the three major annual inter-county competitions; the All-Ireland Senior Hurling Championship, the Leinster Senior Hurling Championship — they are the current champions — and the National Hurling League.

It formerly competed in the abolished Connacht Senior Hurling Championship (winning the last title in 1999) and between 1959 and 1969, played in the Munster Senior Hurling Championship.

Galway's home ground is Pearse Stadium, Salthill. The team's manager is Micheál Donoghue.

Galway are the Leinster Senior Champions of 2026.

The team last won the All-Ireland Senior Championship in 2017 and the National League in 2021.

== History ==
=== 1887–1979: First All-Ireland SHC title and 'curse' ===
Galway finished as runner-up in the first edition of the All-Ireland Senior Hurling Championship (SHC), losing to Tipperary in the 1887 final.

The team did not reach another final in the competition until the 1923 championship. In the 1923 final, Galway defeated Limerick, to become All-Ireland SHC champions for the first time. Galway advanced to the final on four more occasions during that decade (1924, 1925, 1928 and 1929) but lost each game.

Galway finished as All-Ireland SHC runner-up on three occasions in the 1950s (1953, 1955 and 1958), and by then it had been 35 years since the team's only title win. Like other counties with a history of success that preceded a lengthy period without title wins (Mayo in football and Clare in hurling), Galway's hurling team became the subject of rumours of a curse. In 1969 Connacht reached the final of the interprovincial Railway Cup for the first time in ten years with a team consisting mainly of Galway players; Connacht held Munster to a draw before losing the replay, and this boosted the game in the county. However, Galway's following All-Ireland SHC campaign ended with a loss to London in the 1969 championship. The following year Connacht lost at home to Ulster in the preliminary round of the 1970 Railway Cup, running up a total of 20 wides. By the time Galway's hurlers were heavily defeated in the 1975 and 1979 All-Ireland SHC finals, "the curse" had become part of folklore.

=== 1980–1988: Second, third and fourth All-Ireland SHC titles ===
Galway GAA club Castlegar won the 1979–80 All-Ireland Senior Club Hurling Championship, while Connacht defeated Munster in that year's Railway Cup final. Cyril Farrell was Galway's senior county hurling team manager for the 1980 championship. Due to the lack of competition for Galway in Connacht, the team's first match of the season came against Kildare in the All-Ireland SHC quarter-final, a game which Galway won comfortably by a scoreline of 5–15 to 1–11. From there the team progressed to an All-Ireland SHC semi-final against Leinster Senior Hurling Championship (SHC) winner Offaly. Galway secured a two-point win over Offaly, by a scoreline of 4–9 to 3–10. Thus Galway qualified for the 1980 All-Ireland Senior Hurling Championship Final, where the opponent was Limerick. A close game, in which five goals were scored, finished in Galway's favour by a scoreline of 2–15 to 3–9. Joe Connolly, the team captain, became the first Galway man to lift the Liam MacCarthy Cup since Mick Kenny in 1923.

As the defending champion, the Galway team played its first game in the 1981 All-Ireland SHC, a quarter-final against Antrim, on 19 July, winning by a scoreline of 6–23 to 3–11. The team progressed to an All-Ireland SHC semi-final against Limerick, opponent from the previous year's final. That game finished level at 1–08 to 0–11, with Galway the goal-scoring team. Galway emerged from the replay as five-point winners, qualifying for the deciding match of the competition on a final scoreline of 4–16 to 2–17. Galway played Leinster SHC winner Offaly, whom it had defeated in the 1980 All-Ireland SHC semi-final, in the 1981 final. Galway did not retain the title, losing by a scoreline of 2–12 to 0–15 (a three-point defeat).

Galway defeated Cork in the 1985 All-Ireland SHC to qualify for the final. Again the opponent was Offaly, again Galway lost the game, by a scoreline of 2–11 to 1–12 on this occasion. Galway finished as runner-up again in the 1986 final, losing to Cork in that game.

Still managed by Farrell, Galway defeated Tipperary by a scoreline of 3–20 to 2–17 in the 1987 All-Ireland SHC semi-final to advance to a third consecutive final. Captained by Conor Hayes and inspired by a young Joe Cooney (who scored five points), Galway defeated Kilkenny by a scoreline of 1–12 to 0–09. Cooney, aged 22, was named Hurler of the Year.

Galway opened the defence of its title against London on 16 July, winning the 1988 All-Ireland SHC quarter-final by a scoreline of 4–30 to 2–08. Offaly was the opponent in the All-Ireland SHC semi-final, a team that had given Galway repeated difficulty; Galway, though, emerged as the winner on this occasion, by a scoreline of 3–18 to 3–11. Galway defeated Tipperary by a scoreline of 1–15 to 0–14 in the 1988 final, winning a fourth All-Ireland SHC title. This was also the first time Galway had retained the title it had won the previous year.

=== 1989–2011: Decline ===
Galway narrowly lost to Tipperary in a controversial 1989 All-Ireland SHC semi-final. Cork defeated Galway in the 1990 All-Ireland SHC Final, while Kilkenny defeated the team in the 1993 All-Ireland SHC Final.

For the 2009 All-Ireland SHC, Galway began a trial period of three years participation in the Leinster SHC.

Galway won the 2010 National Hurling League (NHL), its ninth title, with a 2–22 to 1–17 win against Cork at Semple Stadium in May that year.

Galway opened its 2010 Leinster SHC campaign with a quarter-final against Wexford, winning the game by 11 points. Galway advanced to the Leinster SHC semi-final to play Offaly. On 20 June, Offaly and Galway drew, 3–16 and 2–19 apiece. Six days later, Galway defeated Offaly in the replay, thus progressing to a first Leinster SHC Final. Kilkenny won its 20th consecutive championship game, defeating Galway by a scoreline of 1–19 to 1–12 in the Leinster SHC final. Despite the loss, Galway received an automatic 2010 All-Ireland SHC quarter-final berth. In that game Galway met Tipperary, losing by a scoreline of 3–17 to 3–16. In the 2010 All-Ireland SHC Final, Tipperary defeated a Kilkenny team that was seeking its fifth consecutive championship title.

Galway won four of its first five matches in the 2011 National Hurling League, including a victory over Kilkenny, but lost the last two games. A Leinster SHC quarter-final win against Westmeath was followed by a Leinster SHC semi-final against Dublin; though Joe Canning scored an early goal for Galway, his team lost. In two qualifying matches, Galway easily knocked out Clare and Cork, sending the team through to a 2011 All-Ireland SHC quarter-final and a game against the Munster Senior Hurling Championship (SHC) runner-up, Waterford. Waterford had two weeks earlier lost to Tipperary by seven goals. Waterford, however, defeated Galway by a scoreline of 2–23 to 2–13, a ten-point difference.

=== 2011–2015: Cunningham era, revival ===
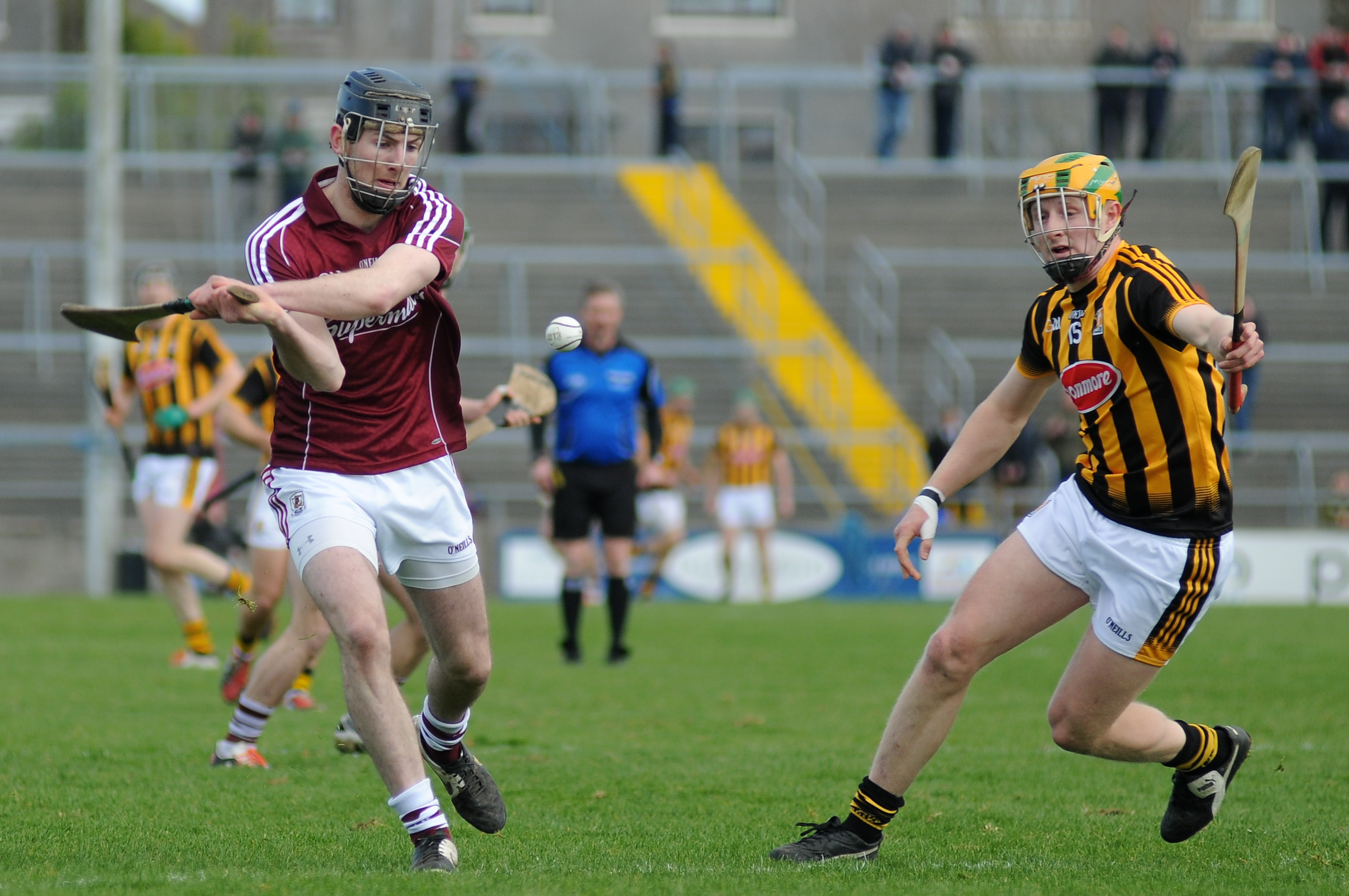
Pádraic Mannion in action for Galway in the team's 2015 National Hurling League victory over All-Ireland SHC title holder Kilkenny

Anthony Cunningham, who had recently led the Galway under-21 team to an All-Ireland title, was appointed manager of the senior team. Mattie Coleman and Tom Helebert were picked to help Cunningham. Galway barely saved its Division 1 status in the 2012 National Hurling League, requiring a replay in a relegation play-off match against Dublin.

Galway defeated Westmeath and Offaly in the 2012 Leinster SHC, advancing to the competition's final. In an unexpected result, Galway defeated Kilkenny to win the Bob O'Keefe Cup for the first time. A 2012 Leinster SHC winners' medal was later sold on eBay for €570. Galway met Cork in an All-Ireland SHC semi-final, eventually winning that game after a slow first half. The 2012 All-Ireland SHC Final paired Galway with Kilkenny again. Joe Canning scored a goal for Galway in the tenth minute and his team led by five points at half-time: 1–9 to 0–7. Kilkenny recovered, however, and, late in the game, a Henry Shefflin point taken from the penalty spot separated the sides. Then, with 30 seconds left, Davy Glennon was fouled and Joe Canning scored for Galway from the free, sending the All-Ireland SHC Final to a replay for the first time in 53 years. Kilkenny easily won the replay, by a final scoreline of 3–22 to 3–11.

== Panel ==
Team as per Galway vs Cork in semi-final of the All-Ireland SHC, 4 July 2026

No.	Player	Position	Club
1	Darach Fahy	Goalkeeper	Ardrahan
2	Joshua Ryan	Right corner back	Clarinbridge
3	Cillian Trayers	Full back	Turloughmore
4	Darren Morrissey (c)	Left corner back	Sarsfields
5	Pádraic Mannion	Right half back	Ahascragh-Fohenagh
6	Daithí Burke	Centre back	Turloughmore
7	Ronan Glennon	Left half back	Mullagh
8	Tiernan Killeen	Midfield	Loughrea
9	Gavin Lee	Midfield	Clarinbridge
10	Tom Monaghan	Right half forward	Craughwell
11	Cathal Mannion	Centre forward	Ahascragh-Fohenagh
12	Darragh Neary	Left half forward	Castlegar
13	Conor Whelan	Right corner forward	Kinvara
14	Jason Rabbitte	Full forward	Athenry
15	Aaron Niland	Left corner forward	Clarinbridge

No.	Player	Position	Club
16	Éanna Murphy	Goalkeeper	Tommy Larkin's
17	Shane Morgan	Corner back	Loughrea
18	Fintan Burke	Full back	St Thomas’
19	Cian Daniels	Midfield	Tommy Larkin's
20	Cianan Fahy	Midfield	Ardrahan
21	Conor Cooney	Full forward	St Thomas’
22	John Fleming	Wing forward	Meelick–Eyrecourt
23	Seán Linnane	Wing back	Turloughmore
24	Cillian Whelan	Corner forward	Turloughmore
25	Colm Molloy	Corner forward	Kilnadeema–Leitrim
26	Brian Concannon	Corner forward	Killimordaly

^{INJ} Player has had an injury which has affected recent involvement with the county team.
^{RET} Player has since retired from the county team.
^{WD} Player has since withdrawn from the county team due to a non-injury issue.

== Management team ==
- Manager: Micheál Donoghue
- Coach: Eamon O'Shea
- Selectors: Francis Forde, Noel Larkin

== Managerial history ==
Babs Keating 1976–1977

Joe McGrath 1977–1978

Babs Keating (2) 1978–1979

Cyril Farrell 1979–1982

Frank Corcoran 1982–1984

Cyril Farrell (2) 1984–1991

Jarlath Cloonan 1991–1994

Mattie Murphy 1994–1996

Cyril Farrell (3) 1996–1998

Mattie Murphy (2) 1998–2000

Noel Lane 2000–2002

Conor Hayes 2002–2006

Ger Loughnane 2006–2008

John McIntyre 2008–2011

Anthony Cunningham 2011–2015

Micheál Donoghue 2015–2019

Shane O'Neill 2019–2021

Henry Shefflin 2021–2024

Micheál Donoghue (2) 2024–

== Players ==
=== Records ===
- At 32 years of age, David Burke became his county's appearance record holder (63) against Cork in the 2022 All-Ireland Senior Hurling Championship quarter-final on 18 June 2022.

=== All Stars ===
Galway has 98 All Stars, as of 2023. Joe Canning, Joe Cooney and Pete Finnerty each won five All Stars.

1965: Jimmy Duggan
1966: Mattie Fox
1971: John Connolly
1975: Niall McInerney, Sean Silke, Iggy Clarke
1976: Joe McDonagh, Frank Burke
1977: P. J. Molloy
1978: Iggy Clarke^{2nd}
1979: Iggy Clarke^{3rd}, John Connolly^{2nd}, Frank Burke^{2nd}
1980: Niall McInerney^{2nd}, Jimmy Cooney, Sean Silke^{2nd}, Iggy Clarke^{4th}, Joe Connolly^{3rd}, Bernie Forde
1981: Jimmy Cooney^{2nd}, Steve Mahon
1983: Noel Lane
1984: Noel Lane^{2nd}
1985: Seamus Coen, Sylvie Linnane, Pete Finnerty, Brendan Lynskey, Joe Cooney
1986: Conor Hayes, Sylvie Linnane^{2nd}, Pete Finnerty^{2nd}, Tony Keady, Joe Cooney^{2nd}
1987: Conor Hayes^{2nd}, Ollie Kilkenny, Pete Finnerty^{3rd}, Steve Mahon^{2nd}, Michael McGrath, Joe Cooney^{3rd}
1988: John Commins, Sylvie Linnane^{3rd}, Conor Hayes^{3rd}, Pete Finnerty^{4th}, Tony Keady^{2nd}, Martin Naughton, Michael McGrath^{2nd}
1989: John Commins^{2nd}, Sean Treacy, Michael Coleman, Joe Cooney^{4th}, Éanna Ryan
1990: Pete Finnerty^{5th}, Michael Coleman^{2nd}, Joe Cooney^{5th}
1991: Sean Treacy^{2nd}
1993: Pádraig Kelly, Pat Malone, Joe Rabbitte
1995: Michael Coleman^{3rd}
1996: Tom Helebert
1997: Kevin Broderick
2000: Joe Rabbitte^{2nd}
2001: Ollie Canning, Liam Hodgins, Kevin Broderick, Eugene Cloonan
2003: Ollie Canning^{2nd}
2005: Ollie Canning^{3rd}, Derek Hardiman, Ger Farragher, Damien Hayes
2008: Joe Canning
2009: Ollie Canning^{4th}, Joe Canning^{2nd}
2010: Damien Hayes^{2nd}
2012: Fergal Moore, David Collins, Iarla Tannian, Damien Hayes^{3rd}, Joe Canning^{3rd}, David Burke
2015: Colm Callanan, Daithí Burke, David Burke^{2nd}, Cathal Mannion
2016: Daithí Burke^{2nd}, David Burke^{3rd}
2017: Pádraic Mannion, Daithí Burke^{2nd}, Gearóid McInerney, David Burke^{4th}, Joe Canning^{4th}, Conor Whelan, Conor Cooney
2018: Daithí Burke^{3rd}, Pádraic Mannion^{2nd}, Joe Canning^{5th}
2020: Daithí Burke^{4th}
2022: Pádraic Mannion^{3rd}

== Colours and crest ==
The crest of the Galway hurlers, until a new design was introduced in 2013

Galway's traditional colours are maroon and white. In the early years of GAA competition, Galway teams wore the colours of the Galway Senior Hurling Championship winner. In 1936, however, the county adopted maroon as its primary colour. A crest was added to the jersey in the 1950s, with a different crest for hurling than for football. Although the team most often wears white shorts and maroon socks, it has also worn an all maroon kit in the past.

The hurling team began using the same jerseys and crest as the football team ahead of the 2013 National Hurling League. The new crest was mostly similar to the previous hurling crest, with the most notable differences being the angle of the boat, and the replacement of the letters CLG with GAA.

Galway's final hurling crest was based on the coat of arms of Galway city, shown on the right, with the county's Irish name, Gaillimh, and the initials CLG written underneath (CLG being short for Cumann Lúthchleas Gael, the GAA's Irish name.)

=== Team sponsorship ===
The Supermac's fast food chain began sponsoring the team for the first time in 1989, with its name first featuring on team jerseys in 1991. The company announced its latest five-year sponsorship deal in November 2022, expected to last until 2027.

Years	Sponsor	
Years	Manufacturer	Sponsor
1880s–1991	O'Neills (1918–)	No Sponsor
1991–	O'Neills (1918–)	Supermac's

== Honours ==
=== National ===
- All-Ireland Senior Hurling Championship
  - (gold) Winners (5): 1923, 1980, 1987, 1988, 2017
  - (silver) Runners-up (21): 1887, 1924, 1925, 1928, 1929, 1953, 1955, 1958, 1975, 1979, 1981, 1985, 1986, 1990, 1993, 2001, 2005, 2012, 2015, 2018, 2026
- National Hurling League
  - (gold) Winners (11): 1930–31, 1950–51, 1974–75, 1986–87, 1988–89, 1995–96, 2000, 2004, 2010, 2017, 2021 (shared)
  - (silver) Runners-up (6): 1978–79, 1985–86, 1993–94, 1997, 1999, 2008
- All-Ireland Intermediate Hurling Championship
  - (gold) Winners (3): 1999, 2002, 2015
  - (silver) Runners-up (5): 1972, 1973, 1997, 2000, 2005
- All-Ireland Junior Hurling Championship
  - (gold) Winners (2): 1939, 1996
  - (silver) Runners-up (7): 1924, 1926, 1940, 1941, 1983, 1984, 1989
- All-Ireland Under-21 Hurling Championship
  - (gold) Winners (10): 1972, 1978, 1983, 1986, 1991, 1993, 1996, 2005, 2007, 2011
  - (silver) Runners-up (11): 1979, 1982, 1987, 1994, 1997, 1998, 1999, 2002, 2003, 2010, 2016
- All-Ireland Under-20 Hurling Championship
  - (silver) Runners-up (2): 2021, 2026
- All-Ireland Minor Hurling Championship
  - (gold) Winners (14): 1983, 1992, 1994, 1999, 2000, 2004, 2005, 2009, 2011, 2015, 2017, 2018, 2019, 2020
  - (silver) Runners-up (21): 1931, 1933, 1941, 1947, 1951, 1955, 1958, 1970, 1973, 1981, 1982, 1993, 1996, 1997, 2001, 2003, 2006, 2008, 2013, 2021, 2023
- All-Ireland Vocational Schools Championship
  - (gold) Winners (15): 1980, 1981, 1982, 1983, 1984, 1985, 1986, 1987, 1992, 1993, 1994, 1995, 1999, 2001, 2002, 2003, 2011

=== Provincial ===
- Connacht Senior Hurling Championship
  - (gold) Winners (25): 1900, 1901, 1902, 1903, 1904, 1905, 1906, 1907, 1908, 1910, 1911, 1912, 1914, 1915, 1917, 1919, 1920, 1921, 1922, 1994, 1995, 1996, 1997, 1998, 1999
  - (silver) Runners-up (1): 1909
- Leinster Senior Hurling Championship
  - (gold) Winners (4): 2012, 2017, 2018 2026
  - (silver) Runners-up (8): 2010, 2013, 2015, 2016, 2020, 2022, 2023, 2025
- Leinster Intermediate Hurling Championship
  - (gold) Winners (1): 2015
- Leinster Under-21 Hurling Championship
  - (gold) Winners (2): 2018, 2021
- Leinster Under-20 Hurling Championship
  - (silver) Runners-up (1): 2020
- Walsh Cup
  - (gold) Winners (5): 2010, 2015, 2019, 2023, 2026
  - (silver) Runners-up (4): 2009, 2012, 2017, 2020

=== Other ===
- Players Champions Cup
  - (gold) Winners (1): 2015
- Wild Geese Trophy
  - (gold) Winners (1): 2018

== See also ==
- Galway–Kilkenny hurling rivalry
