= Pádraic Mannion =

Galway hurler (born 1993)

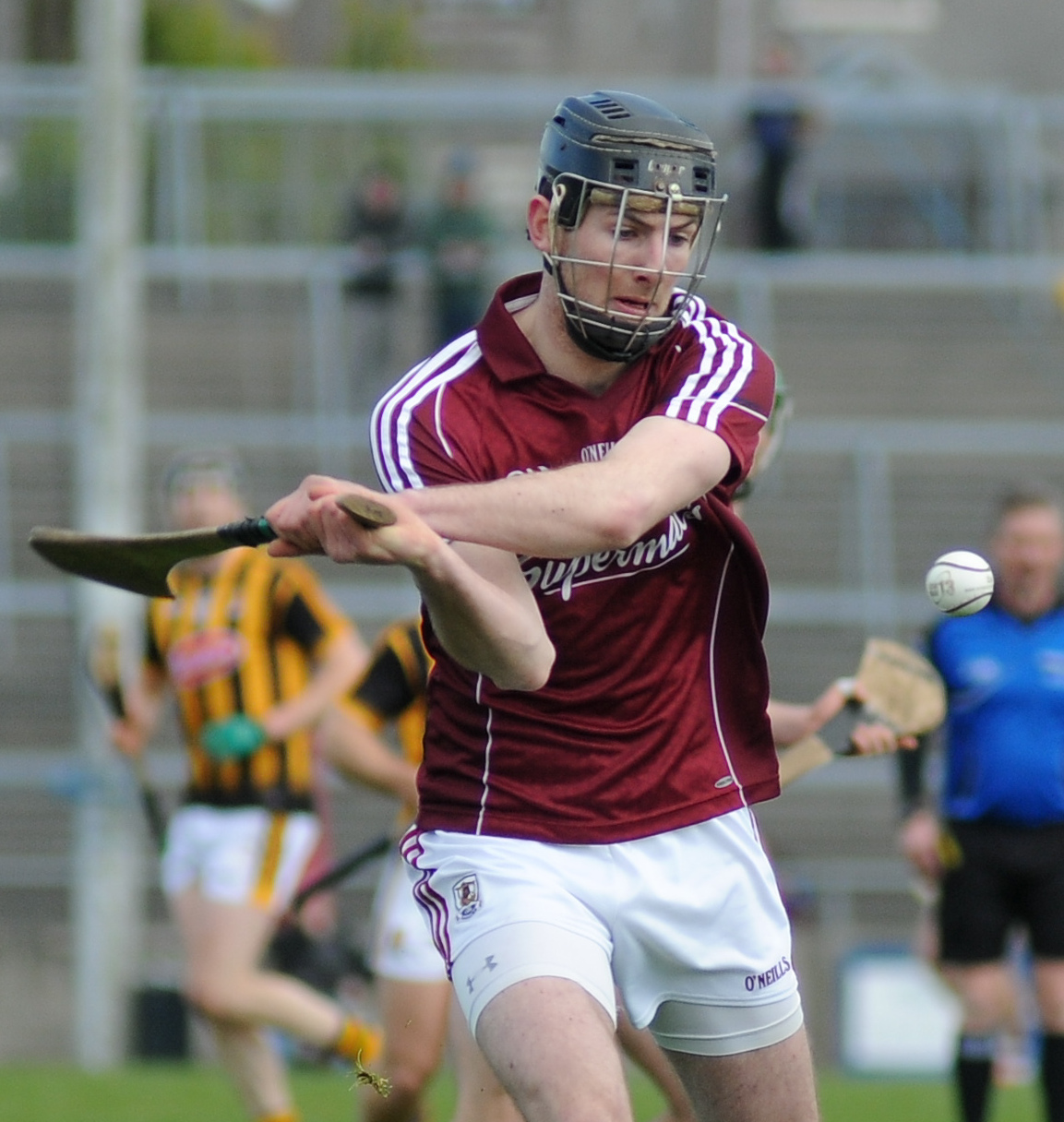
- Mannion playing for Galway in 2015

Personal information
- Native name: Pádraic Ó Mainnín (Irish)
- Born: 6 March 1993 (age 33) Ballinasloe, County Galway, Ireland
- Occupation: Student
- Height: 1.85 m (6 ft 1 in)

Sport
- Sport: Hurling
- Position: Right wing-back
Clubs
- Years: Club
- 2010– 2010–: Ahascragh-Fohenagh; Caltra
Club titles
	Football	Hurling
Galway titles	0	0
College
- Years: College
- NUI Galway
College titles
- Fitzgibbon titles: 0
Inter-county*
Years	County	Apps (scores)
2015–	Galway	24 (0–12)
Inter-county titles
- Leinster titles: 3
- All-Irelands: 1
- NHL: 2
- All Stars: 3
- *Inter County team apps and scores correct as of 14:20, 12 August 2018.

Pádraic Mannion (born 6 March 1993) is an Irish hurler, he also plays as a right wing-back for club side Ahascragh-Fohenagh and at inter-county level with the Galway senior hurling team. His brother, Cathal, also plays for both teams.

== Playing career ==
=== College ===
Mannion first came to prominence as a hurler with St Cuan's College in Castleblakeney, winning a Connacht Junior C Championship title with the school in 2009.

=== University ===
As a student at NUI Galway, Mannion was a regular player on the university's senior hurling team in the Fitzgibbon Cup.

=== Club ===
Mannion joined the Ahascragh-Fohenagh club at a young age and played in all grades at juvenile and underage levels, enjoying championship success in the minor and under-21 grades, before joining the club's top adult team. He also plays Gaelic football with the Caltra club.

On 23 October 2016, Mannion was captain of the Ahascragh-Fohenagh that defeated Ballinderreen by 2–15 to 0–08 in the final of the Galway Intermediate Championship. He later won a Connacht Championship medal after a 2–20 to 0–13 defeat of Ballyhaunis in a final replay. On 18 February 2017, Mannion captained the team from centre-back in a 2–15 to 0-06 All-Ireland final defeat by Carrickshock.

=== Inter-county ===
==== Minor ====
Mannion first played for Galway as a member of the minor hurling team on 23 July 2011. He made his first appearance in an 8–26 to 0-12 All-Ireland quarter-final defeat of Antrim at Parnell Park. On 4 September 2011, Mannion was at left corner-back for Galway's 1–21 to 1–12 defeat of Dublin in the All-Ireland final at Croke Park.

==== Intermediate ====
As a member of the Galway intermediate hurling team, Mannion made his only appearance for the team on 18 August 2012 in a 0–21 to 1-13 All-Ireland semi-final defeat by Kilkenny.

==== Senior ====
Mannion made his debut for the Galway senior team on 22 February 2015 in a 2–18 to 0-20 National Hurling League defeat by Tipperary. He later made his first championship start on 6 June 2015 in a 5–19 to 1–18 defeat of Dublin. On 6 September 2015, Mannion was at left corner-back for Galway's 1–22 to 1–18 defeat by Kilkenny in the All-Ireland final.

On 23 April 2017, Mannion was at right wing-back when Galway defeated Tipperary by 3–21 to 0–14 to win the National Hurling League. Later that season he won his first Leinster Championship medal after Galway's 0–29 to 1–17 defeat of Wexford in the final. On 3 September 2017, Mannion started for Galway at right wing-back when they won their first All-Ireland in 29 years after a 0–26 to 2–17 defeat of Waterford in the final. He ended the season by winning an All-Star award.

On 8 July 2018, Mannion won a second successive Leinster Championship medal following Galway's 1–28 to 3–15 defeat of Kilkenny in the final.

== Career statistics ==
As of match played 5 August 2018.

Team	Year	National League			Leinstser		All-Ireland		Total	
Team	Year	Division	Apps	Score	Apps	Score	Apps	Score	Apps	Score
Galway	2015	Division 1A	4	0-00	3	0-02	3	0-00	10	0-00
Galway	2016	Division 1A	2	0-00	3	0-02	2	0-01	7	0-00
Galway	2017	Division 1B	6	0-03	3	0-03	2	0-01	11	0-07
Galway	2018	Division 1B	5	0-05	6	0-03	2	0-00	13	0-08
Total			17	0-08	15	0-10	9	0-02	41	0-20

== Honours ==
St Cuan's College

- Connacht Colleges Junior C Hurling Championship (1): 2009

Ahascragh-Fohenagh

- Connacht Intermediate Club Hurling Championship (1): 2016
- Galway Intermediate Hurling Championship (1): 2016
- Galway Under-21 B Hurling Championship (1): 2011
- Galway Under-21 C Hurling Championship (1): 2010
- Galway Minor B Hurling Championship (1): 2009

Galway

- All-Ireland Senior Hurling Championship (1): 2017
- Leinster Senior Hurling Championship (2): 2017, 2018
- National Hurling League Division 1 (2): 2017, 2021
- All-Ireland Minor Hurling Championship (1): 2011

Awards

- The Sunday Game Team of the Year (3): 2017, 2018, 2022
- The Sunday Game Hurler of the Year (1): 2018
- GAA GPA All Stars Awards (3): 2017, 2018, 2022

Sporting positions
Preceded by David Burke	Galway Senior Hurling Captain; 2020–2021	Succeeded by Daithí Burke
