= Tony Óg Regan =

Irish hurler

Personal information
- Native name: Antoine Ó Riagáin (Irish)
- Nickname: Ogie
- Born: 14 November 1983 (age 42) Galway, Ireland
- Height: 6 ft 3 in (191 cm)

Sport
- Sport: Hurling
- Position: Centre Back
Club
- Years: Club
- 2000-: Rahoon-Newcastle
Inter-county
Years	County	Apps (scores)
2004-2013	Galway	36 (0-8)
Inter-county titles
- Leinster titles: 1
- All-Irelands: 0
- NHL: 2
- All Stars: 0

Tony Óg Regan (born 14 November 1983) is an Irish sportsperson. He plays hurling with his local club Rahoon-Newcastle and with the Galway senior inter-county team.

Regan won a minor All-Ireland Final with Galway in 2000, defeating Cork, but was on the team that lost to Cork in 2001. He then progressed to the Under-21 team, losing finals to Limerick in 2002 and Kilkenny in 2003. Following winning an All Intermediate Final in 2002, Regan made his senior championship debut for Galway in 2003 and played in the All Ireland Finals of 2005 and 2012 (draw and replay). Regan won National League medals with Galway in 2004 and 2010, while he was also on the first Galway team to win a Leinster championship in 2012.

Regan was nominated for three All-Star awards in 2005, 2010, and 2012.
