= Rahoon–Newcastle GAA =

Gaelic sports club in County Galway, Ireland

Rahoon–Newcastle
- Rahún–an Chaisleán Nua
- Founded: 1889
- County: Galway
- Colours: Maroon and white
- Grounds: Tonabrucky

Playing kits
Home Kit	Change Kit

Senior Club Championships
	All Ireland	Connacht champions	Galway champions
Hurling:	0	0	0

Rahoon–Newcastle GAA is a Gaelic Athletic Association club that takes in an area stretching from Barna to Corcullen (townland on Moycullen–Rahoon parish border) and all the way to Newcastle in Galway City, Ireland. The club, which was founded in 1889, is almost exclusively concerned with the game of hurling.

== Notable players ==
- John Hanbury
- Tony Óg Regan

== Honours ==
- Galway Junior Hurling Championship (1): 1966
- Galway Intermediate Hurling Championship (1): 1977
- Galway Under-21 "C" Hurling Championship (1):1986
- Galway Minor "B" Hurling Championship (1): 1988
- Galway Junior "A" Hurling Championship (1): 1992
