= 2023–24 Harty Cup =

Hurling tournament

2023–24 Dr. Harty Cup
- Dates: 11 October 2023 – 3 February 2024
- Teams: 21
- Sponsor: TUS
- Champions: Nenagh CBS (1st title); Darragh McCarthy (captain); Donach O'Donnell (manager)
- Runners-up: Ardscoil Rís; Fintan Fitzgerald (captain); Seán McMahon (captain); Liam Cronin (manager); Derek Larkin (manager)

Tournament statistics
- Matches played: 38
- Goals scored: 101 (2.66 per match)
- Points scored: 1314 (34.58 per match)
- Top scorer(s): Darragh McCarthy (1-50)

The 2023–24 Dr. Harty Cup was the 103rd staging of the Harty Cup since its establishment in hurling by the Munster Council of Gaelic Athletic Association in 1918. The draw for the group stage took place on 17 August 2023. The competition contested from 11 October 2023 to February 2023.

Cashel Community School unsuccessfully defended its title in the preliminary quarter-finals against Chareville CBS.

St Joseph's CBS, Nenagh won the Harty Cup final on 3 February 2024 at Cusack Park in Ennis, 2-16 to 0-21, against Ardscoil Rís, their first ever meeting in a final and their first ever Harty Cup title.

Darragh McCarthy was the top scorer with 1-50.

== Group A ==
=== Group A table ===
Knockout stage

Team	Matches				Score			Pts
Team	Pld	W	D	L	For	Against	Diff	Pts
Midleton CBS	3	3	0	0	62	51	11	6
Christian Brothers College	3	1	1	1	58	59	-1	3
Rice College	3	0	2	1	56	62	-6	2
Scoil na Tríonóide	3	0	1	2	54	58	-4	1

=== Group A results ===
11 October 2023 Round 1	Midleton CBS	1-17 - 0-14	Rice College	UL Maguires Field
	Barry Walsh (0-1 65), Ben Walsh 0-4 each, D McCarthy 0-3 f, C Barry 1-0, C Leahy, J O’Brien 0-2 each, J O’Leary, D Murnane 0-1 each.	Report	C Perill 0-6 (0-5 f), P O’Donovan 0-3, J O’Neill 0-2, R McDermott, D Moroney, C Nash (f) 0-1 each.	Referee: J O'Halloran (Limerick)

18 October 2023 Round 1	Scoil na Tríonóide	1-12 - 1-15	Christian Brothers College	Banteer Sportsfield
	C Hayes 0-7 (0-6f), T Hourigan 1-1, A Moloney 0-2, D Hogan, T Ryan 0-1 each.	Report	D Wall 0-9 (0-6f, 0-2 65), F Barry 1-0, Conor McCarthy (Glen Rovers) 0-1f, B Mayer, J Brosnan, Conor McCarthy (St Finbarr’s), D O’Connor, P O’Shea 0-1 each.	Referee: D Hickey (Cork)

24 October 2023 Round 2	Rice College	2-14 - 4-08	Scoil na Tríonóide	UL Grounds, North Campus
	P O'Donovan 0-11 (0-7 frees, 0-1 '65'), J O'Neill 1-1, F Lyons 1-0, R Mulcahy, L Clune 0-1 each.	Report	C Hayes 1-4 (1-0 penalty, 0-4 frees), T Hourigan 2-0, E Coleman 1-0, A Moloney 0-2, T Ryan 0-1;

25 October 2023 Round 2	Christian Brothers College	0-18 - 1-19	Midleton CBS	Bishopstown Grounds
	P O’Shea (0-8); D Wall (0-5, 0-4 frees); C McCarthy (0-2, 0-1 free, 0-1 ‘65); J Huggins, B Mayer, J Hegarty (0-1 each).	Report	Barry Walsh (0-5, 0-3 frees, 0-1 65); J O’Brien, C Leahy (0-3 each); C Barry (1-0); J O’Leary, Ben Walsh (0-2 each); D Murnane (free), C O’Callaghan, P Walsh, F O’Connor (0-1 each).

15 November 2023 Round 3	Christian Brothers College	2-16 - 1-19	Rice College	UL Grounds, North Campus
	D Wall (1-6, 1-6 frees); J Cronin (1-2); B Mayer, P Lehane (0-2 each); C McCarthy (Glen Rovers, 0-1 free), P O’Shea, A Hourigan, M Brosnan (0-1 each).	Report	P O’Donovan (0-7, 0-7 frees); J O’Neill (0-6); E Lahiffe (1-0); F Lyons, C Perill (0-2 each); E Fitzpatrick, D Moroney (0-1 each).

15 November 2023 Round 3	Scoil na Tríonóide	1-16 - 1-17	Midleton CBS	FitzGerald Park
	O Holmes 0-6 (3 frees, 1 '65'), T Hourigan 1-1, A Moloney 0-4 (2 frees), C Hayes 0-3 (3 frees), E Coleman 0-2.	Report	D McCarthy 0-5 (2 frees), Colm leahy 1-0, B Walsh 0-3, J O'Brien, D Murnane (2 frees), J O'Leary, B Walsh 0-2 each, P Walsh 0-1.

== Group B ==
=== Group B table ===
Knockout stage

Team	Matches				Score			Pts
Team	Pld	W	D	L	For	Against	Diff	Pts
Thurles CBS	3	3	0	0	80	52	28	6
St Colman's College	3	2	0	1	61	55	6	4
St Joseph's SS	3	1	0	2	58	65	-7	2
Pobalscoil na Tríonóide	3	0	0	3	47	74	-27	0

=== Group B results ===
11 October 2023 Round 1	Thurles CBS	1-15 - 0-13	St Colman's College	Canon Hayes Park
	C Fitzpatrick (0-11, 0-9f), L Corcoran 1-2, J Doyle 0-1, C Minogue 0-1.	Report	L Og Hegarty 0-6f, S O’Donoghue (0-2, 0-1f), J O’Brien 0-2, C O’Leary 0-1, B Spillane 0-1, L Foley 0-1.	Referee: A Purcell (Tipperary)

11 October 2023 Round 1	St Joseph's Secondary school	0-17 - 2-06	Pobalscoil na Tríonóide	UL Maguires Field
	D Fox 0-7 (0-3 frees), M Corbett 0-7 (0-6 frees), D White 0-2, L Murphy 0-1.	Report

25 October 2023 Round 2	Pobalscoil na Tríonóide	1-12 - 3-14	St Colman's College	Bishopstown Grounds
	J Casey 0-10 (0-9 f), B Lynch 1-1, S Coughlan 0-1.	Report	L Foley 0-4, L Óg Hegarty (0-2 f), S O’Donoghue 0-3 each, O Fitzgerald, F Lardner, C O’Leary 1-0 each, L Roche 0-2, D Hickey, K O’Donoghue 0-1 each.

26 October 2023 Round 2	St Joseph's SS	2-13 - 2-22	Thurles CBS	UL Grounds, Maguires Pitches
	M Corbett 1-6 (1-4 frees, 0-2 ’65); D White 1-0; L Murphy, D Fox 0-2 each; S Boyce, E Mulcahy, R McMahon 0-1 each.	Report	C Fitzpatrick 0-12 (0-9 frees); D Costigan 1-3; R Ryan 0-5; D Carr 1-0; J Doyle, D Kelly 0-1 each.

15 November 2023 Round 3	St Joseph's SS	2-16 - 2-19	St Colman's College	UL Grounds, North Campus
	M Corbett (1-10, 0-8 frees, 1-0 pen); L Murphy (1-1); E Mulcahy (0-2); S Boyce, B Kelleher, D Fox (0-1 each).	Report	L Óg Hegarty (0-7, 0-4 frees, 0-1 ‘65); C O’Leary (1-2); L Roche (1-1); L Foley (0-4); S O’Donoghue (0-2); F Lardner, T McGrath, D Hickey (0-1 each).

15 November 2023 Round 3	Pobalscoil na Tríonóide	2-14 - 1-31	Thurles CBS	Bishopstown Grounds
	J Casey 0-7 (0-5 from frees), B Lynch 1-1, S Coughlan 0-3, C Galvin 0-2, S Meade 0-1.	Report	D Costigan 1-6, R Ryan 0-9 (0-3 from frees), C Minogue 0-7, R Bargery 0-3, J Doyle 0-1, K Laffan 0-1, D Kelly 0-1, K Cantwell 0-1, K Loughnane 0-1, E Murray 0-1.

== Group C ==
=== Group C table ===
Knockout stage

Team	Matches				Score			Pts
Team	Pld	W	D	L	For	Against	Diff	Pts
Ardscoil Rís	3	3	0	0	70	43	27	6
St Flannan's College	3	2	0	1	68	51	17	4
De La Salle Waterford	3	0	1	2	51	61	-10	1
Coláiste Choilm	3	0	1	2	53	87	-34	1

=== Group C results ===
11 October 2023 Round 1	Ardscoil Rís	0-14 - 0-08	St Flannan's College	O'Garney Park
	F Fitzgerald 0-6 (0-3 frees), D Chaplin 0-3 (0-2 frees), D Stritch 0-2, J Finn, M O'Brien and M O'Halloran 0-1 each.	Report	T Boddy 0-6 (0-5 frees, '65), F Hegarty 0-2

11 October 2023 Round 1	De La Salle College Waterford	1-13 - 1-13	Coláiste Choilm	Dungarvan Sports Complex
	C Hartley 0-8 (0-6 f), J Kirwan 1-0, A Regan, T Carey, C Tobin, R Doherty, M Hartley 0-1 each.	Report	E Dwyer 0-9 (0-8 f), D Murphy 1-0, J McCarthy 0-2 f, S O’Neill, S Lenihan 0-1 each.	Referee: T Lonergan (Tipperary)

25 October 2023 Round 2	Ardscoil Rís	2-26 - 2-14	Coláiste Choilm	Banteer Sportsfield
	D Chaplin (1-7, 0-4 frees, 0-1 65), F Fitzgerald (0-6, 0-1 free), D Neville (1-1), M Collins and D Stritch (0-4 each), E Begley (0-2), J Finn, M O’Halloran (0-1).	Report	D Murphy (2-2), E Dwyer (0-3 frees) and J McCarthy (0-2 frees) (0-4 each), D Clifford, J Galvin, N Buckley and J Murray (0-1 each).

25 October 2023 Round 2	St Flannan's College	0-21 - 2-14	De La Salle College Waterford	Fethard Town Park, 3G All Weather Pitch
	T Boddy (0-9, 8 frees); R Kilroy, L Cleary (0-3 each); J Casey, F Hegarty (0-2 each); E Price, H Doherty (0-1 each).	Report	T Carey (1-7, 0-7 frees); A O’Neill (1-0); C Carroll, M Hartley (0-2 each); C Tobin, C Hartley, R Doherty (0-1 each).

15 November 2023 Round 3	St Flannan's College	2-33 - 0-17	Coláiste Choilm	Banteer Sportsfield
	T Boddy 0-9 (0-6 f), J Mescall 0-6, L Cleary 1-3, F Hegarty 0-5, M Power 1-0, F Meaney, J Hegarty (f), J Casey 0-2 each, C Griffin, I Williams, E Price, M O’Connor 0-1 each.	Report	E Dwyer 0-8 (0-5 f), J McCarthy 0-3 f, D Murphy, S O’Neill, D O’Leary, B Dore, C Malone, N Buckley 0-1 each.

15 November 2023 Round 3	Ardscoil Rís	0-24 - 2-09	De La Salle College Waterford	Canon Hayes Park
	M Collins 0-7, D Chaplin 0-4 (0-3 frees), E Begley 0-3, F Fitzgerald 0-3 (0-1 free), M O'Brien, P Kearney 0-2 each, J Moylan, D Neville, S Duff 0-1 each.	Report	T Carey 1-7 (all frees), S Power 1-1, C Tobin 0-1.

== Group D ==
=== Group D table ===
Knockout stage

Team	Matches				Score			Pts
Team	Pld	W	D	L	For	Against	Diff	Pts
Nenagh CBS	2	2	0	0	54	37	17	4
Charleville CBS	2	1	0	1	31	31	0	2
Hamilton High School	2	0	0	2	42	59	-17	0

=== Group D results ===
11 October 2023 Round 1	Nenagh CBS	1-12 - 1-08	Charleville CBS	Meelick Grounds
	D McCarthy (0-7 frees), D Quinn (1-2), M Ryan (0-2), E Doughan (0-1 free).	Report	E O’Mahony (1-1), J Hickey (0-1 free) and K Murphy (0-2 frees, 0-1 65) (0-3 each), C Dunne (0-1 free).	Referee: S Carey (Patrickswell)

25 October 2023 Round 2	Nenagh CBS	4-27 - 4-14	Hamilton High School	Banteer Grounds
	D McCarthy (1-12, 0-8 frees), A O’Connor (2-3), D Quinn (1-1), J Hackett and E Doughan (0-3 each), M Ryan and A Duff (0-2 each), J Mulcahy (0-1 free).	Report	S Mac an tSaoi (2-5, 1-0 pen, 0-4 frees), L Griffin (1-1), M Maguire (1-0), H O’Sullivan (0-3), K D O’Flynn (free), S Ahern, C Twomey, N Daly and J Buckley (0-1 each).

14 November 2023 Round 3	Charleville CBS	0-20 - 1-13	Hamilton High School	Banteer Grounds
	C Dunne (0-9, 6 frees, 1 65); G Gleeson (0-3); K Murphy (0-2 frees); N Tobin, F O’Sullivan, S Bresnan, T O’Neill, E Horgan, J Hickey (0-1 each).	Report	S Mac an tSaoi (0-7, 5 frees); H O’Mahony (1-0); O Gillain (0-2); S Crowe, O McCarthy, H O’Sullivan, M Maguire (0-1 each).

== Group E ==
=== Group E table ===
Knockout stage

Team	Matches				Score			Pts
Team	Pld	W	D	L	For	Against	Diff	Pts
John the Baptist CS	2	1	1	0	48	41	7	3
Castletroy College	2	1	0	1	32	37	-5	2
Carrick-on-Suir CBS	2	0	1	1	45	47	-2	1

=== Group E results ===
11 October 2023 Round 1	John the Baptist Community School	2-14 - 1-10	Castletroy College	FitzGerald Park
	O Meany (1-8, 1-0 pen, 4f, 1 ’65), H Murnane (1-1), D Hurley (0-3), G McCaffrey, B Callinan (0-1 each).	Report	D Ferland (1-7, 7fs), L Ryan, M Fitzgerald, D Carr (0-1 each).	Referee: E Stapleton (Doon)

25 October 2023 Round 2	Castletroy College	1-16 - 0-17	Carrick-on-Suir CBS	UL grounds, North Campus
	D Ferland 0-8 (0-6 frees, 0-1 ’65); R O’Farrell 0-5; M Field 1-2; M Fitzgerald 0-1.	Report	N O’Brien 0-7 (all frees); D Comerford 0-4; S Tobin 0-3; G Power 0-2; A Phelan 0-1.

15 November 2023 Round 3	Carrick-on-Suir CBS	4-16 - 2-22	John the Baptist Community School	Fethard Town Park, 3G All Weather Pitch
	N O’Brien (2-7, 0-7 frees), E Hogan (2-0), G Power and S Tobin (0-3 each), S Foley, D Comerford and C Phelan (0-1 each).	Report	O Meany (0-7, 0-5 frees, 0-2 65s), H Murnane (1-2), C Cronin (0-5), H Flanagan (1-1, 0-1 free), D Hurley (0-3), B Callinan (0-2), M Leo and J O’Neill (0-1 each).

== Group F ==
=== Group F table ===
Knockout stage

Team	Matches				Score			Pts
Team	Pld	W	D	L	For	Against	Diff	Pts
Cashel Community School	2	1	0	1	50	48	2	2
Our Lady's SS	2	1	0	1	48	49	-1	2
Gaelcholáiste Mhuire	2	1	0	1	40	41	-1	2

=== Group F results ===
11 October 2023 Round 1	Gaelcholáiste Mhuire	1-18 - 0-20	Cashel Community School	Banteer Sportsfield
	R Ó Súilleabháin 0-9 (0-5f), DJ Ó Cofaigh 1-4, K Ó Gealbháin 0-2, SP Cúc, L Ó Muirthile, C Ó Súilleabháin 0-1 each.	Report	O O’Donoghue 0-10 (0-6f), S Buckley 0-4 (0-3f, 0-1 65), B O’Donoghue, A Daly 0-2 each, S Kennedy, D Fogarty 0-1 each.	Referee: M Sexton (Limerick)

25 October 2023 Round 2	Gaelcholáiste Mhuire	2-13 - 0-21	Our Lady's SS	Fethard Town Park, 3G All Weather Pitch
	R Ó Súilleabháin (0-10, 6 frees, 1 65); L Ó Muirthile, DJ Ó Cofaigh (1-0 each); C Ó Néill, J Ó hÉigeartaigh, C Ó Súilleabháin (0-1 each).	Report	J Ormond (0-16, 10 frees, 3 65s); P O’Dwyer (0-2); TJ Kinane, C O’Shea, J Quinn (0-1 each).

15 November 2023 Round 3	Our Lady's SS	2-21 - 4-18	Cashel Community School	Fethard Town Park, 3G All Weather Pitch
	J Ormond (1-13, 1-9 frees), C O’Shea (1-1), J Quinn (0-3), P O’Dwyer (0-2), E Boyle and J Marnell (0-1 each).	Report	O O’Donoghue (1-7, 0-3 frees), B O’Donoghue (2-1), S Buckley (0-6, 0-2 frees), S Kennedy (1-0), C Ryan (0-2), A Daly and P Colville (0-1 each).

== Knockout stage ==
=== Preliminary quarter-finals ===
29 November 2023 Preliminary quarter-final	John the Baptist Community School	3-21 - 3-17	Our Lady's Secondary SS	Fethard Town Park, 3G All Weather Pitch
	O Meaney 1-6 (1-5 frees, '65), H Murnane 2-2, D Hurley 0-6, S Casey and H Flanagan 0-2 each, C Cronin, D Heavey 0-1 and S Ryan 0-1 each.	Report	J Ormond 1-9 (1-5 frees), C O'Shea 1-3, S Stapleton 1-0, E Boyle 0-2, S Gleeson, M Cahill and J Quinn 0-1 each.

29 November 2023 Preliminary quarter-final	Charleville CBS	1-17 - 0-19	Cashel Community School	Canon Hayes Park
	C Dunne (0-6, 0-5 frees), E O’Mahony (1-2), J Hickey (0-4), G Gleeson and E Horgan (0-2 each), K Murphy (0-1 free).	Report	O O’Donoghue (0-7, 0-4 frees, 0-3 sl) A Daly (0-5), S Buckley (0-1 free, 0-1 65) and C Ryan (0-2 each), B O’Donoghue, P Dalton and S Cooney (0-1 each).	Referee: J Murphy (Limerick)

29 November 2023 Preliminary quarter-final	St Flannan's College	3-20 - 1-07	Castletroy College	Meelick Grounds
	M Power 2-1, T Boddy 0-6 (0-5 frees), F Hegarty 0-4, R Kilroy 1-0, J Hegarty 0-3 (all frees), H Doherty 0-2, J Cleary, J Mescall, L Cleary, R Loftus 0-1 each.	Report	D Ferland 0-3 (all frees), M Field (1-0), R O'Farrell 0-2 (both frees), C O'Mara, D Carr 0-1 each.

4 December 2023 Preliminary quarter-final	St Colman's College	0-08 - 1-07	Christian Brothers College	Mallow GAA Complex
	L Hegarty 0-6 f, S O’Donoghue, L Foley 0-1 each.	Report	D Wall 1-6 (0-5 f, 0-1 65), P Lehane 0-1.

=== Quarter-finals ===
10 January 2024 Quarter-final	Christian Brothers College	0-06 - 2-16	Nenagh CBS	Canon Hayes Park
	D Wall (0-2 frees), A Hourigan, P O’Shea (0-2 each).	Report	D McCarthy (0-11, 0-7 frees, 0-1 ‘65); D Quinn (1-1); A O’Connor (1-0); E Doughan (0-2); A Hoolan, C Foley (0-1 each).

10 January 2024 Quarter-final	Charleville CBS	1-20 - 2-11	Midleton CBS	Mallow GAA Complex
	C Dunne 0-12 (0-9f), K Murphy 0-3f, L O’Mahony 1-0, G Gleeson 0-2, R Troy, E Horgan, P Daly 0-1 each.	Report	Barry Walsh 2-1, D McCarthy 0-3 (0-2f), S Irwin, Ben Walsh, D Murnane (0-1f) 0-2 each, C Leahy 0-1.

10 January 2024 Quarter-final	Thurles CBS	2-21 - 1-17	St Flannan's College	Meelick Grounds
	C Fitzpatrick (1-10, 6fs, 1 ’65); R Ryan (0-5); D Costigan (1-1); J Hayes (0-2), E Murray, B Flanagan, D Kelly 0-1 each.	Report	T Boddy 0-14, (10fs, 1 ’65), L Cleary 1-0, R Kilroy, F Hegarty and H Doherty (0-1 each).

10 January 2024 Quarter-final	Ardscoil Rís	0-17 - 0-13	John the Baptist Community School	FitzGerald Park
	D Chaplin (0-6, 5 frees, 1 65); M Collins, M O’Brien (0-3 each); F Fitzgerald (0-2, 1 free); J Finn, E Begley, E Carey (0-1 each).	Report	O Meany (0-6 frees); H Flanagan (0-4, 2 frees); D Hurley (0-2); G McCaffrey (0-1).

=== Semi-finals ===
20 January 2024 Semi-final	Ardscoil Rís	0-18 - 1-14	Thurles CBS	FitzGerald Park
	D Chaplin 0-6 (0-3 frees, 0-1 ’65); M O’Brien 0-4 (0-3 frees, 0-1 ’65); D Strich 0-3; D Scully, M Collins 0-2 each; F Fitzgerald 0-1.	Report	C Fitzpatrick 1-7 (0-5 frees); E Murray 0-3; R Ryan 0-2 (0-1 s/l); J Doyle, J Hayes 0-1 each.

20 January 2024 Semi-final	Nenagh CBS	2-18 - 1-17	Charleville CBS	Cappamore Grounds
	D McCarthy (0-13, 0-9 frees), A O’Connor and D Treacy (1-0 each), E Doughan (0-2), J Mulcahy, D Quinn and A Duff (0-1 each.	Report	C Dunne (1-9, 0-5 frees), K Murphy (0-3 frees), E O’Mahony (0-2), T O’Neill, G Gleeson and J Hickey (0-1 each).

=== Final ===
3 February 2024 Final	Ardscoil Rís	0-21 - 2-16	Nenagh CBS	Cusack Park
	M O’Brien (0-1 free), F Fitzgerald (0-5 each); D Chaplin (0-2 frees), M Collins (0-3 each); E Begley (0-2); D Scully, D Gleeson, P Kearney (0-1 each).	Report	D McCarthy (0-7, 0-4 frees); A Duff (1-1); M Cawley, E Doughan (0-3); A Hoolan (1-0); C Foley (0-2).	Referee: C McAllister (Cork)

== Championship statistics ==
=== Top scorers ===
Overall

Rank	Player	County	Tally	Total	Matches	Average
1	Darragh McCarthy	Nenagh CBS	1-50	53	5	10.60
2	Cormac Fitzpatrick	Thurles CBS	2-40	46	4	11.50
3	Jamie Ormond	Our Lady's SS	2-38	44	3	14.66
3	Tadhg Boddy	St Flannan's College	0-44	44	5	8.80
5	Chris Dunne	Charleville CBS	1-37	40	5	8.00
6	Diarmuid Wall	CBC Cork	2-28	34	5	6.80
7	Owen Meaney	John the Baptist CS	2-27	33	4	8.25
8	Daniel Chaplin	Ardscoil Rís	1-29	32	6	5.33
9	Matthew Corbett	St Joseph's SS	2-23	29	3	9.66
10	Oisín O'Donoghue	Cashel Community School	1-24	27	3	9.00

Single game

Rank	Player	Club	Tally	Total	Opposition
1	Jamie Ormond	Our Lady's SS	1-13	16	Cashel Community School
1	Jamie Ormond	Our Lady's SS	0-16	16	Gaelcholáiste Mhuire
3	Darragh McCarthy	Nenagh CBS	1-12	15	Hamilton High School
4	Tadhg Boddy	St Flannan's College	0-14	14	Thurles CBS
5	Niall O'Brien	Carrick-on-Suir CBS	2-07	13	John the Baptist CS
5	Cormac Fitzpatrick	Thurles CBS	1-10	13	St Flannan's College
5	Matthew Corbett	St Joseph's SS	1-10	13	St Colman's College
5	Darragh McCarthy	Nenagh CBS	0-13	13	Charleville CBS
9	Jamie Ormond	Our Lady's SS	1-09	12	John the Baptist CS
9	Chris Dunne	Charleville CBS	1-09	12	Nenagh CBS
9	Cormac Fitzpatrick	Thurles CBS	0-12	12	St Joseph's SS
9	Chris Dunne	Charleville CBS	0-12	12	Midleton CBS
