= John Hanbury (hurler) =

Irish hurler (born 1993)

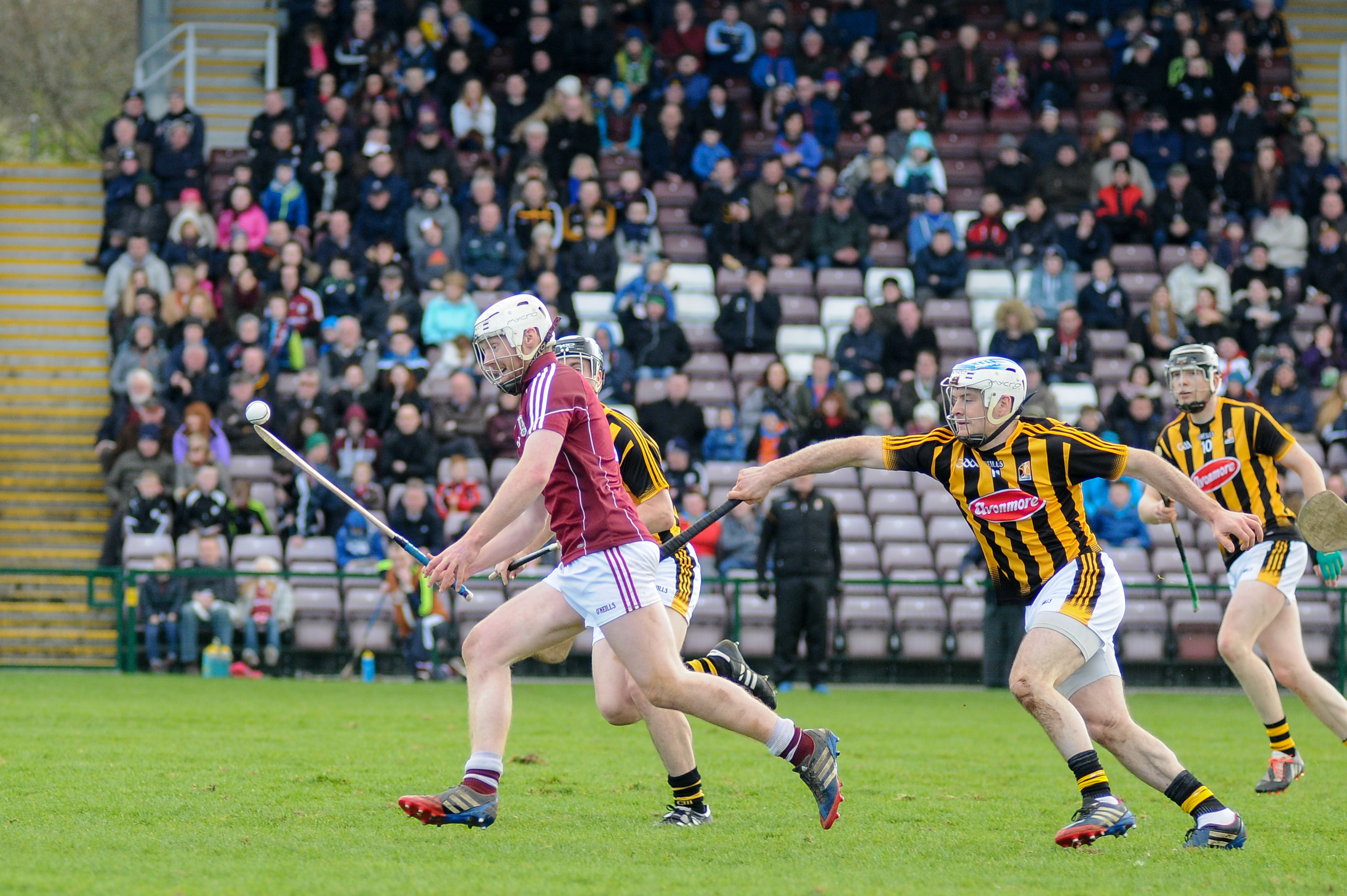
- John Hanbury (wine coloured top) in action for Galway chased by Jonjo Farrell (second from right) of Kilkenny in the 2015 National Hurling League at Pearse Stadium

Personal information
- Native name: Seán Ó hAnmhuire; Jean Anburrie (Irish)
- Nickname: Janbury
- Born: 13 May 1993 (age 33) Leicester
- Occupation: Software engineer/fishmonger
- Height: 1.87 m (6 ft 2 in)

Sport
- Sport: Hurling American Football
- Position: Left corner-back, H-Back
Club
- Years: Club
- 2010–present: Rahoon-Newcastle GAA
College
- Years: College
- NUI Galway
College titles
- Fitzgibbon titles: 0
Inter-county*
Years	County	Apps (scores)
2015–2019	Galway	25 (0-01)
Inter-county titles
- Leinster titles: 2
- All-Irelands: 1
- NHL: 1
- All Stars: 0
- *Inter County team apps and scores correct as of 18:25, 11 August 2018.

John Hanbury (born 13 May 1993) is a former Irish hurler who played as a left corner-back for club side Rahoon-Newcastle and formerly at inter-county level with the Galway senior hurling team. He has played American football with the Irish Wolfhounds.

== Playing career ==
=== University ===
As a student at NUI Galway, Hanbury was a regular player on the university's senior hurling team in the Fitzgibbon Cup.

=== Club ===
Hanbury joined the Rahoon-Newcastle club at a young age and played in all grades at juvenile and underage levels, enjoying championship success in the under-21 grade in 2013., Currently plays American football with Amsterdam Crusaders and on the Irish National American Football Team.

=== Inter-county ===
==== Minor and under-21 ====
Hanbury first played for Galway as a member of the minor hurling team on 23 July 2011. He made his first appearance in an 8–26 to 0-12 All-Ireland quarter-final defeat of Antrim at Parnell Park. On 4 September 2011, Hanbury was at left wing-back in Galway's 1–21 to 1–12 defeat of Dublin in the All-Ireland final at Croke Park.

As a member of the Galway under-21 hurling team, Hanbury made his first appearance on 24 August 2013 in a 0–07 to 1-16 All-Ireland semi-final defeat by Clare.

==== Senior ====
Hanbury made his debut for the Galway senior team on 15 February 2015 in a 2–15 to 1-17 National Hurling League defeat of Clare. On 6 September 2015, Hanbury was at full-back for Galway's 1–22 to 1–18 defeat by Kilkenny in the All-Ireland final.

On 23 April 2017, Hanbury came on as a 65th-minute substitute for Daithí Burke when Galway defeated Tipperary by 3–21 to 0–14 to win the National Hurling League. Later that season he won his first Leinster Championship medal after Galway's 0–29 to 1–17 defeat of Wexford in the final. On 3 September 2017, Hanbury started for Galway at left corner-back when Galway won their first All-Ireland in 29 years after a 0–26 to 2–17 defeat of Waterford in the final.

On 8 July 2018, Hanbury won a second successive Leinster Championship medal following Galway's 1–28 to 3–15 defeat of Kilkenny in the final.

== Career statistics ==
As of match played 5 August 2018.

Team	Year	National League			Leinstser		All-Ireland		Total	
Team	Year	Division	Apps	Score	Apps	Score	Apps	Score	Apps	Score
Galway	2015	Division 1A	6	0-00	4	0-01	3	0-00	13	0-01
Galway	2016	Division 1A	4	0-00	3	0-00	2	0-00	9	0-00
Galway	2017	Division 1B	7	0-00	3	0-00	2	0-00	12	0-00
Galway	2018	Division 1B	5	0-01	6	0-00	2	0-00	13	0-01
Total			22	0-01	16	0-01	9	0-00	47	0-02

== Honours ==
Rahoon-Salthill

- Galway Under-21 B Hurling Championship (1): 2013

Galway

- All-Ireland Senior Hurling Championship (1): 2017
- Leinster Senior Hurling Championship (2): 2017, 2018
- National Hurling League Division 1 (1): 2017
- All-Ireland Minor Hurling Championship (1): 2011
