= Declan McLaughlin =

Irish hurler

Personal information
- Born: 10 August 2002 (age 24) Portumna, County Galway, Ireland
- Occupation: Student

Sport
- Sport: Hurling
- Position: Left corner-forward
Club
- Years: Club
- Portumna
Club titles
- Galway titles: 0
College
- Years: College
- 2021-2025: Mary Immaculate College
College titles
- Fitzgibbon titles: 0
Inter-county
- Years: County
- 2023-: Galway
Inter-county titles
- Leinster titles: 0
- All-Irelands: 0
- NHL: 0
- All Stars: 0

Declan McLaughlin (born 2002) is an Irish hurler. At club level he plays with Portumna, while he has also lined out at inter-county level with various Galway teams.

== Career ==
McLaughlin first played hurling to a high standard as a student at Portumna Community School. He later lined out with Mary Immaculate College in the Fitzgibbon Cup. At club level, McLaughlin first played hurling at juvenile and underage levels with the Portumna club before joining the senior team.

McLaughlin first appeared at inter-county level with Galway as a member of the extended minor panel that won the All-Ireland MHC title in 2019. He later joined the under-20 team. He made his senior team debut in 2023.

== Honours ==
Galway

- All-Ireland Minor Hurling Championship: 2019
