= 1986–87 National Hurling League =

56th season of the National Hurling League

League details
- Dates: 12 October 1986 – 3 May 1987

League champions
- Winners: Galway (4th win)

Other division winners
- Division 2: Tipperary
- Division 3: Down
- Division 4: Tyrone

The 1986–87 National Hurling League (known as the Ford National Hurling League for sponsorship reasons) was the 56th season of the National Hurling League.

== Division 1 ==
National Hurling League Division 1
- Season: 1986-87
- Champions: Galway; 4th National League title Captain: Conor Hayes; Manager: Cyril Farrell
- Relegated: Offaly; Westmeath
- Matches: 33
- Top goalscorer: Cyril Lyons (4-51)
- Biggest home win: Limerick 3-16 - 1-7 Westmeath (12 October 1986)
- Biggest away win: Galway 5-16 - 1-12 Waterford (19 April 1987)
- Highest scoring: Cork 5-8 - 2-21 Galway (12 October 1986)
- All statistics correct as of 24 February 2017.

Kilkenny came into the season as defending champions of the 1985-86 season. Westmeath and Wexford entered Division 1 as the promoted teams.

On 3 May 1987, Galway won the title following a 3–12 to 3–10 win over Clare in the final. It was their first league title since 1974-75 and their 3rd National League title overall.

Offaly and Westmeath were relegated from Division 1.

Clare's Cyril Lyons was the Division 1 top scorer with 4-51.

=== Table ===
Pos	Team	Pld	W	D	L	Pts	Qualification or Relegation
1	Clare	7	6	0	1	12	Division 1 Runners-Up
2	Galway	7	5	1	1	11	Division 1 Champions
3	Cork	7	5	0	2	10	
4	Limerick	7	4	0	3	8	
5	Kilkenny	7	3	0	4	6	
6	Wexford	7	1	2	4	4	
7	Westmeath	7	2	0	5	4	Relegated to Division 2
8	Offaly	7	0	1	6	1	Relegated to Division 2

=== Group stage ===
12 October 1986	Kilkenny	2-13 - 2-7	Offaly	Nowlan Park, Kilkenny
	H Ryan 0-5, T Phelan 1-1, T Bawle 0-4, J Mulcahy 1-0, A Prendergast 0-2, L Fennelly 0-1.		T Conneely 2-1, J Dooley 0-3, M Hanamy 0-1, D Regan 0-1, V Keeshan 0-1.	Referee: JF Bailey (Dublin)

12 October 1986	Cork	5-8 - 2-21	Galway	Páirc Uí Chaoimh, Cork
	T Mulcahy 2-0, K Hennessy 1-2, K Kingston 1-1, J Fitzgibbon 1-0, T O'Sullivan 0-3, J Meyler 0-1, J Hartnett 0-1.		J Cooney 1-7, M McGrath 0-6, A Cunningham 1-1, N Lane 0-3, G Linnane 0-1, N Morrissey 0-1, B Forde 0-1, J Coen 0-1.	Referee: J Kirwan (Offaly)

12 October 1986	Limerick	3-16 - 1-7	Westmeath	Gaelic Grounds, Limerick
	P Carey 2-0, G Kirby 1-2, M Quaid 0-3, M Ryan 0-3, P Foley 0-2, D Fitzgerald 0-2, P Kelly 0-2, T Kenny 0-2.		M Kilcoyne 1-1, M Cosgrave 0-4, P Kiernan 0-1, R Shaw 0-1.

12 October 1986	Wexford	1-13 - 1-14	Clare	Wexford Park, Wexford
	J Holohan 1-10, J Murphy 0-1, P Courtney 0-1, G O'Connor 0-1.		C Lyons 0-5, V Donnellan 0-4, T Guilfoyle 1-0, G McInerney 0-3, M Deasy 0-1, S Fitzpatrick 0-1.	Referee: J Moore (Waterford)

26 October 1986	Galway	0-18 - 1-11	Kilkenny	Pearse Stadium, Salthill
	J Cooney 0-6, G Linnane 0-3, M McGrath 0-2, J Coen 0-2, N Lane 0-2, P Murphy 0-1, J Commins 0-1, A Cunningham 0-1.		R power 1-1, T Lennon 0-4, H Ryan 0-3, L Ryan 0-2, L Fennelly 0-1.	Referee: G Ryan (Tipperary)

26 October 1986	Clare	2-14 - 2-7	Limerick	Cusack Park, Ennis
	S Dolan 1-1, G McInerney 1-1, C Lyons 0-4, S Fitzpatrick 0-3, V Donnellan 0-2, M Deasy 0-2, J Shanahan 0-1.		T Kenny 1-4, G Kirby 1-1, S Fitzgibbon 0-1, M Quaid 0-1.	Referee: JJ Corcoran (Galway)

26 October 1986	Westmeath	2-8 - 0-18	Wexford	Cusack Park, Mullingar
	M Cosgrave 0-4, D Kilcoyne 1-0, E Gallagher 1-0, M Kennedy 0-2, P Kiernan 0-1, J Kilcoyne 0-1.		J Holohan 0-11, M Fitzhenry 0-2, G O'Connor 0-2, M Hanrick 0-1, T Dempsey 0-1, P Bardon 0-1.	Referee: N O'Donoghue (Dublin)

26 October 1986	Offaly	1-12 - 4-9	Cork	St. Brendan's Park, Birr
	J Dooley 0-8, P Cleary 1-0, D Owens 0-1, J Kelly 0-1, D Regan 0-1, D Fogarty 0-1.		J Fitzgibbon 2-0, M Foley 1-2, T Mulcahy 1-1, K Kingston 0-2, G Cunningham 0-1, S McCarthy 0-1, J Cashman 0-1, L Kelly 0-1.

9 November 1986	Galway	1-12 - 2-12	Westmeath	St. Brendan's Park, Loughrea
	N Lane 1-1, M McGrath 0-2, M Donoghue 0-2, P Murphy 0-2, G Linnane 0-1, A Cunningham 0-1, O Kilkenny 0-1, S Mahon 0-1, J Coen 0-1.		D Kilcoyne 1-7, P Conran 1-1, M Kilcoyne 0-2, J Lynch 0-2.	Referee: N Duggan (Limerick)

9 November 1986	Kilkenny	4-9 - 3-10	Wexford	Nowlan Park, Kilkenny
	P Brennan 2-0, T Phelan 1-1, A Prendergast 1-1, T Bawle 0-2, T Lennon 0-2, H Ryan 0-1, J Hennessy 0-1, L Ryan 0-1.		J Holohan 0-7, M Fitzhenry 1-1, S Fitzhenry 1-0, M Hanrick 1-0, J Fleming 0-1, D Murphy 0-1.	Referee: G Ryan (Tipperary)

9 November 1986	Cork	2-12 - 1-12	Limerick	Páirc Uí Chaoimh, Cork
	K Kingston 1-4, T O'Sullivan 0-5, L Kelly 0-1, B Harte 0-1, K Hennessy 0-1.		D Fitzgerald 0-6, G Kirby 1-1, L O'Donoghue 1-0 (og), G Hegarty 0-1, P Carey 0-1, T Kenny 0-1, M Ryan 0-1, M Quaid 0-1.	Referee: J Moore (Waterford)

9 November 1986	Offaly	2-10 - 2-13	Clare	St. Brendan's Park, Birr
	J Dooley 1-3, D Regan 1-0, T Connors 0-3, S Coughlan 0-2, M Coughlan 0-1, D Owens 0-1.		C Lyons 1-5, S Dolan 1-1, V Donnellan 0-3, S Fitzpatrick 0-2, G McInerney 0-1, J Shanahan 0-1.	Referee: N O'Donoghue (Dublin)

23 November 1986	Westmeath	1-8 - 4-9	Cork	Cusack Park, Mullingar
	D Kilcoyne 0-6, JJ Lynch 1-0, M Kennedy 0-1, M Kilcoyne 0-1.		T Mulcahy 2-0, M Foley 1-2, K Hennessy 1-0, K Kingston 0-2, T O'Sullivan 0-2, J Cashman 0-1, B Harte 0-1, J O'Callaghan 0-1.	Referee: G Long (Tipperary)

23 November 1986	Clare	2-12 - 0-12	Kilkenny	Cusack Park, Ennis
	C Lyons 2-4, V Donnellan 0-4, S Fitzpatrick 0-2, T Guilfoyle 0-1, G McInerney 0-1.		H Ryan 0-3, T Lennon 0-2, T Bawle 0-2, L Ryan 0-2, T Phelan 0-1, M Cleere 0-1, P Brennan 0-1.	Referee: T Murray (Limerick)

23 November 1986	Limerick	2-6 - 2-13	Galway	Gaelic Grounds, Limerick
	M Quaid 2-0, D Fitzgerald 0-3, G Kirby 0-1, S Fitzgibbon 0-1, J Carroll 0-1.		J Cooney 0-5, M McGrath 1-1, T Keady 1-1, J Ryan 0-4, M Naughton 0-1, S Mahon 0-1.	Referee: J Kirwan (Offaly)

23 November 1986	Wexford	1-10 - 2-7	Offaly	Wexford Park, Wexford
	T Dempsey 0-4, M Storey 0-3, D Murphy 1-0, S Fitzhenry 0-1, J Fleming 0-1, M Hanrick 0-1.		J Dooley 1-3, P Connors 1-0, D Owens 0-2, P Cleary 0-1, M Coughlan 0-1.	Referee: J Moore (Waterford)

7 December 1986	Clare	2-8 - 5-7	Galway	Cusack Park
	T Guilfoyle 1-3, C Lyons 0-4, G McInerney 1-0, S Fitzpatrick 0-1.		E Ryan 3-1, J Coen 1-1, M Naughton 1-0, J Cooney 0-3, N Lane 0-2.	Referee: G Ryan (Tipperary)

7 December 1986	Offaly	0-11 - 3-5	Westmeath	St. Brendan's Park, Birr
	J Dooley 0-7, M Coughlan 0-2, D Fogarty 0-1, D Owens 0-1.		D Kilcoyne 2-3, P Clancy 1-1, M Kilcoyne 0-1.	Referee: S Corcoran (Galway)

7 December 1986	Limerick	2-10 - 2-9	Kilkenny	Gaelic Grounds, Limerick
	T Kenny 1-3, G Kirby 1-2, M Ryan 0-3, D Fitzgerald 0-2.		R Power 0-7, T Lennon 1-1, L Fennelly 1-0, L Ryan 0-1.	Referee: F Murphy (Cork)

7 December 1986	Cork	2-12 - 2-7	Wexford	Páirc Uí Chaoimh, Cork
	K Hennessy 1-0, M Foley 1-0, T O'Sullivan 0-4, K Kingston 0-3, T McCarthy 0-2, B Harte 0-1, J Cashman 0-1, M Mullins 0-1.		J Holohan 0-4, M Storey 1-0, M Fitzhenry 1-0, D Murphy 0-2, G O'Connor 0-1.	Referee: JF Bailey (Dublin)

15 February 1987	Galway	1-7 - 0-5	Offaly	St. Jarlath's Park, Tuam
	N Lane 1-0, E Ryan 0-2, M Naughton 0-2, J Coen 0-2, J Cooney 0-1.		J Dooley 0-4, B Keeshan 0-1.

15 February 1987	Wexford	0-8 - 3-8	Limerick	Wexford Park, Wexford
	J Holohan 0-3, S Fitzhenry 0-3, P Courtney 0-1, M Storey 0-1.		T Kenny 2-1, P Carey 1-0, P Kelly 0-3, D Fitzgerald 0-2, S Fitzgibbon 0-1, G Kirby 0-1.

15 February 1987	Kilkenny	2-7 - 4-10	Cork	Nowlan Park, Kilkenny
	L Ryan 1-0, C Heffernan 1-0, P Power 0-3, K Brennan 0-3, T Bawle 0-1.		M Foley 2-0, J Fenton 1-2, T Mulcahy 1-1, K Hennessy 0-2, T O'Sullivan 0-2, M Mullins 0-1, K Kingston 0-1, T McCarthy 0-1.	Referee: J Denton (Wexford)

15 February 1987	Westmeath	4-3 - 2-14	Clare	Cusack Park, Mullingar
	D Kilcoyne 1-2, M Cosgrave 1-1, M Hickey 1-0, J Lynch 1-0.		C Lyons 1-9, G O'Loughlin 1-1, M Guilfoyle 0-2, T Guilfoyle 0-1, J Shanahan 0-1.	Referee: G Ryan (Tipperary)

1 March 1987	Offaly	0-12 - 2-7	Limerick	St. Brendan's Park, Birr
	J Dooley 0-5, D Fogarty 0-2, P Keeshan 0-2, J Kelly 0-1, P Kirwan 0-1, D Owens 0-1.		S Fitzgibbon 1-2, T Kenny 1-1, P Kelly 0-2, D Fitzgerald 0-2.	Referee: F Murphy (Cork)

1 March 1987	Clare	1-12 - 1-7	Cork	Cusack Park, Ennis
	C Lyons 0-8, G McInerney 1-0, G O'Loughlin 0-2, J Shanahan 0-1.		M Foley 1-0, K Kingston 0-2, T O'Sullivan 0-2, T McCarthy 0-2, J Fenton 0-1.	Referee: G Long (Tipperary)

1 March 1987	Galway	0-10 - 1-7	Wexford	Pearse Stadium, Galway
	J Cooney 0-8, P Finnerty 0-1, M Naughton 0-1.		J Holohan 1-2, S Fitzhenry 0-2, T Dempsey 0-1, G o'Connor 0-1, J Fleming 0-1.	Referee: N Duggan (Limerick)

1 March 1987	Westmeath	0-6 - 0-8	Kilkenny	Cusack Park, Mullingar
	D Kilcoyne 0-6.		C Heffernan 0-3, G Fennelly 0-2, M Cleere 0-1, R Power 0-1, P Walsh 0-1.	Referee: JF Bailey (Dublin)

=== Knock-out stage ===
Quarter-finals

29 March 1987 Quarter-final	Waterford	1-13 – 2-9	Cork	Walsh Park, Waterford
	K Delahunty 0-8, P Bennett 1-0, A Cooney 0-3, S Ahearne 0-1, L O'Connor 0-1.		J Fenton 0-6, T Mulcahy 1-0, K Hennessy 1-0, M Mullins 0-1, M Foley 0-1, T McCarthy 0-1.	Referee: T Murray (Limerick)

12 April 1987 Quarter-final	Tipperary	3-15 – 3-14	Limerick	Semple Stadium, Thurles
	N English 1-2, P Fox 1-1, L Stokes 1-1, M Scully 0-4, P Kennedy 0-4, D O'Connell 0-2, J McGrath 0-1.		P Kelly 0-7, G Kirby 1-1, P Carey 1-1, S Fitzgibbon 1-1, M Quaid 0-1, J Carroll 0-1, D Fitzgerald 0-1, B Finn 0-1.	Referee: W Horgan (Cork)

Semi-finals

19 April 1987 Semi-final	Galway	5-16 – 1-12	Waterford	O'Moore Park, Portlaoise
	A Cunningham 3-3, J Cooney 1-7, M McGrath 1-3, T Keady 0-1, T Kilkenny 0-1, M Naughton 0-1.		K Delahunty 0-9, P Bennett 1-0, J Beresford 0-1, N Crowley 0-1, A Cooney 0-1.	Referee: P Long (Kilkenny)

19 April 1987 Semi-final	Clare	2-11 – 1-11	Tipperary	Páirc Uí Chaoimh, Cork
	C Lyons 0-5, M Guilfoyle 0-4, G O'Loughlin 1-0, T Guilfoyle 1-0, G McInerney 0-1, J Callinan 0-1.		P Fox 1-0, C Bonnar 0-2, J McGrath 0-2, M Scully 0-2, M Nolan 0-2, D O'Connell 0-1, P Kenny 0-1, A Ryan 0-1.	Referee: G Kirwan (Offaly)

Final

3 May 1987 Final	Galway	3-12 – 3-10	Clare	Semple Stadium, Thurles
	J Cooney 2-6, A Cunningham 1-1, E Ryan 0-2, B Lynskey 0-1, M Naughton 0-1, M McGrath 0-1.		C Lyons 0-7, T Guilfoyle 1-0, G McInerney 1-0, S Dolan 1-0, M Guilfoyle 0-3.	Attendance: 21,207; Referee: G Kirwan (Offaly)

=== Scoring statistics ===
Top scorer overall

Rank	Player	Team	Tally	Total	Matches	Average
1	Cyril Lyons	Clare	4-51	63	9	7.00
2	Joe Cooney	Galway	4-43	55		
3	Jimmy Holohan	Wexford	2-37	43		
4	David Kilcoyne	Westmeath	5-24	39		
4	Joe Dooley	Offaly	2-33	39	7	
6	Terence Kenny	Limerick	5-12	27		
7	Gary Kirby	Limerick	5-09	24		
8	Tomás Mulcahy	Cork	7-02	23		
8	Mark Foley	Cork	6-05	23		
10	Anthony Cunningham	Galway	5-07	22		

Top scorers in a single game

Rank	Player	Club	Tally	Total	Opposition
1	Jimmy Holohan	Wexford	1-10	13	Clare
2	Anthony Cunningham	Galway	3-03	12	Waterford
2	Joe Cooney	Galway	2-06	12	Clare
2	Cyril Lyons	Clare	1-09	12	Westmeath
5	Jimmy Holohan	Wexford	0-11	11	Westmeath
6	Éanna Ryan	Galway	3-01	10	Clare
6	Cyril Lyons	Clare	2-04	10	Kilkenny
6	Joe Cooney	Galway	1-07	10	Cork
6	David Kilcoyne	Westmeath	1-07	10	Galway
6	Joe Cooney	Galway	1-07	10	Waterford

== Division 2 ==
National Hurling League Division 2
- Season: 1986-87
- Champions: Tipperary; Captain: Richard Stakelum; Manager: Babs Keating
- Promoted: Waterford
- Relegated: Mayo; Meath
- All statistics correct as of 24 February 2017.

Dublin, Laois, Mayo and Waterford entered Division 2 as the promoted and relegated teams from the previous season.

On 1 March 1987, Tipperary secured the title following a 5–18 to 0–2 win over Mayo in the final round of the group stage. Waterford secured promotion to Division 1 as the second-placed team.

Mayo and Meath were relegated from Division 2.

=== Table ===
Pos	Team	Pld	W	D	L	Pts	Qualification or Relegation
1	Tipperary (C)	7	6	0	1	12	Promoted to Division 1
2	Waterford	7	5	1	1	11	Promoted to Division 1
3	Antrim	7	4	1	2	9	
4	Dublin	7	3	2	2	8	
5	Laois	7	3	2	2	8	
6	Kerry	7	2	0	5	4	
7	Mayo	7	1	0	6	2	Relegated to Division 3
7	Meath	7	1	0	6	2	Relegated to Division 3

== Division 3 ==
National Hurling League Division 3
- Season: 1986-87
- Champions: Dublin
- Promoted: Roscommon
- Relegated: Monaghan
- All statistics correct as of 24 February 2017.

Down, Monaghan and Roscommon entered Division 3 as the promoted and relegated teams from the previous season.

On 1 March 1987, Down secured the title following a 3–18 to 0–6 win over Kildare in the final round of the group stage. Roscommon secured promotion to Division 1 as the second-placed team.

Monaghan were relegated from Division 2.

=== Table ===
Pos	Team	Pld	W	D	L	Pts	Qualification or Relegation
1	Down (C)	7	6	0	1	12	Promoted to Division 2
2	Roscommon	7	5	0	2	10	Promoted to Division 2
3	Carlow	7	5	0	2	10	
4	Derry	7	5	0	2	10	
5	Armagh	7	3	0	4	6	
6	Kildare	7	2	0	5	4	
7	Wicklow	7	2	0	5	4	
8	Monaghan	7	0	0	7	0	Relegated to Division 4

== Division Four ==
=== Knock-out stage ===
3 May 1987 Final	Tyrone	2-5 - 1-6	Leitrim	Brewster Park, Enniskillen
