= Tiernan Killeen =

Irish hurler

Personal information
- Native name: Tiarnán Ó Cillín (Irish)
- Born: 25 March 2003 (age 23) Loughrea, County Galway, Ireland
- Occupation: Student
- Height: 6 ft 2 in (188 cm)

Sport
- Sport: Hurling
- Position: Centre-forward
Club
- Years: Club
- 2002-present: Loughrea
Club titles
- Galway titles: 1
College
- Years: College
- 2021-present: University of Galway
College titles
- Fitzgibbon titles: 0
Inter-county
- Years: County
- 2022-present: Galway
Inter-county titles
- Leinster titles: 1
- All-Irelands: 0
- NHL: 0
- All Stars: 0

Tiernan Killeen (born 25 March 2003) is an Irish hurler. At club level, he plays with Loughrea and at inter-county level with the Galway senior hurling team.

== Career ==
Killeen played hurling as a student at St Raphael's College in Loughrea. He played in every grade of hurling during his time there, and won an All-Ireland PPS SBHC medal in 2019 after a 1–18 to 1–14 win over Castlecomer Community School. Killeen added a Conancht PPS SAHC medal to his collection in 2020. He later played with University of Galway in the Fitzgibbon Cup and was named on the Team of the Year in 2023.

At club level, Killeen began his career at juvenile and underage levels with Loughrea. He progressed to adult level and won a Galway SHC medal in 2024 after a 1–15 to 0–16 win over Cappataggle.

Killeen first appeared on the inter-county scene for Galway as a member of the minor team that won consecutive All-Ireland MHC titles in 2019 and 2020. He later played with the under-20 team. Killeen made his senior team debut in 2022.

== Honours ==
St Raphael's College

- Conancht PPS Senior A Hurling Championship: 2020
- All-Ireland PPS Senior B Hurling Championship: 2019
- Conancht PPS Senior B Hurling Championship: 2019

Loughrea

- Galway Senior Hurling Championship: 2024

Galway

- All-Ireland Minor Hurling Championship: 2019, 2020
