= Darach Fahy =

Irish hurler

Personal information
- Native name: Darach Ó Fathaigh (Irish)
- Born: 2000 (age 25–26) Ardrahan, County Galway, Ireland
- Occupation: Student

Sport
- Sport: Hurling
- Position: Goalkeeper
Club
- Years: Club
- Ardrahan
Club titles
- Galway titles: 0
College
- Years: College
- Galway-Mayo Institute of Technology
College titles
- Fitzgibbon titles: 0
Inter-county*
Years	County	Apps (scores)
2020-present	Galway	1 (0-00)
Inter-county titles
- Leinster titles: 1
- All-Irelands: 0
- NHL: 1
- All Stars: 0
- *Inter County team apps and scores correct as of 21:41, 26 July 2021.

Darach Fahy (born 2000) is an Irish hurler who plays for Galway Senior Championship club Ardrahan and at inter-county level with the Galway senior hurling team. He usually lines out at as a goalkeeper.

== Career ==
Fahy first came to prominence in the various juvenile and underage grades with the Ardrahan club. He first appeared on the inter-county scene as goalkeeper with the Galway minor team that won the 2017 All-Ireland Championship before ending the season as goalkeeper on the Team of the Year. Fahy subsequently played for two years with the Galway under-20 team before making his senior debut during the 2020 Walsh Cup.

== Career statistics ==
As of match played 24 July 2021.

Team	Year	National League			Leinster		All-Ireland		Total	
Team	Year	Division	Apps	Score	Apps	Score	Apps	Score	Apps	Score
Galway	2020	Division 1A	0	0-00	0	0-00	0	0-00	0	0-00
Galway	2021	Division 1A	0	0-00	0	0-00	1	0-00	1	0-00
Total			0	0-00	0	0-00	1	0-00	1	0-00

== Honours ==
Galway

- Leinster Senior Hurling Championship (1): 2026,
- National Hurling League (1): 2021
- All-Ireland Minor Hurling Championship (1): 2017
