= Seán Linnane =

Irish hurler (born 1996)

Personal information
- Native name: Seán Ó Líonnáin (Irish)
- Born: 26 January 1996 (age 30) Turloughmore, County Galway, Ireland
- Height: 5 ft 11 in (180 cm)

Sport
- Sport: Hurling
- Position: Center-forward
Club
- Years: Club
- Turloughmore
Club titles
- Galway titles: 0
College
- Years: College
- Mary Immaculate College
College titles
- Fitzgibbon titles: 2
Inter-county*
Years	County	Apps (scores)
2018-present	Galway	3 (0-00)
Inter-county titles
- Leinster titles: 1
- All-Irelands: 0
- NHL: 1
- All Stars: 0
- *Inter County team apps and scores correct as of 13:47, 16 June 2019.

Seán Linnane (born 26 January 1996) is an Irish hurler who plays as a right wing-forward for club side Turloughmore and at inter-county level with the Galway senior hurling team.

== Early life ==
Linnane was born in Turloughmore, County Galway. His father, Gerry, played for Galway while his uncle, Sylvie, won All-Ireland medals with Galway in 1987 and 1988.

== Playing career ==
=== Mary Immaculate College ===
During his studies at Mary Immaculate College, Linnane was selected for the college's senior hurling team. On 27 February 2016, he won a Fitzgibbon Cup medal as Mary I won their first ever title after a 1–30 to 3–22 defeat of the University of Limerick.

=== Turloughmore ===
Linnane joined the Turloughmore club at a young age and played in all grades at juvenile and underage levels, enjoying championship success in the minor grade in 2013. He later joined the club's senior team.

=== Galway ===
==== Minor and under-21 ====
Linnane first played for Galway as a member of the minor hurling team on 28 July 2013. He made his first appearance in a 1–19 to 0-13 All-Ireland quarter-final defeat of Laois. On 8 September 2013, Linnane was at right wing-back in Galway's 1–21 to 0–16 defeat by Waterford in the All-Ireland final at Croke Park.

Linnane's second and final season with the Galway minor team ended with a 1–27 to 2-09 All-Ireland semi-final defeat by Limerick on 17 August 2014.

On 20 August 2016, Linnane made his first appearance for the Galway under-21 team in a 0–21 to 0-19 All-Ireland semi-final defeat of Dublin. In the subsequent All-Ireland final on 10 September 2016, he scored two points in a 5–15 to 0–14 defeat by Waterford.

==== Senior ====
Linnane was one of eight new players drafted onto the Galway senior hurling panel prior to the start of the 2018 National League. He made his senior debut at wing-forward in a 2–18 to 0-17 National Hurling League defeat of Laois on 3 February 2018. Later that season Linnane made his first appearance in the Leinster Championship, replacing John Hanbury for the final two minutes of a 1–23 to 0–17 defeat of Wexford at Innovate Wexford Park. On 8 July 2018, he was an unused substitute in Galway's 1–28 to 3-15 Leinster final replay defeat of Kilkenny at Semple Stadium. In the subsequent All-Ireland final against Limerick on 19 August, Linnane was an unused substitute when Galway were beaten by 3–16 to 2–18.

== Career statistics ==
As of match played 15 June 2019.

Team	Year	National League			Leinster		All-Ireland		Total	
Team	Year	Division	Apps	Score	Apps	Score	Apps	Score	Apps	Score
Galway	2018	Division 1B	1	0-01	1	0-00	0	0-00	2	0-01
Galway	2019	Division 1B	4	0-00	2	0-00	0	0-00	6	0-00
Total			5	0-01	3	0-00	0	0-00	8	0-00

== Honours ==
Mary Immaculate College

- Fitzgibbon Cup (1): 2016

Turloughmore

- Galway Minor Hurling Championship (1): 2013

Galway

- National Hurling League (1): 2021
- Leinster Senior Hurling Championship (1): 2018

Sporting positions
Preceded by Darragh Dolan	Galway minor hurling team captain 2014	Succeeded by Seán Loftus
