= Cianan Fahy =

Irish hurler

Personal information
- Native name: Cianan Ó Fathaigh (Irish)
- Born: 1998 (age 27–28) Ardrahan, County Galway, Ireland
- Occupation: Student

Sport
- Sport: Hurling
- Position: Right wing-forward
Club
- Years: Club
- Ardrahan
Club titles
- Galway titles: 0
College
- Years: College
- Galway-Mayo Institute of Technology
College titles
- Fitzgibbon titles: 0
Inter-county*
Years	County	Apps (scores)
2022-	Galway	0 (0-00)
Inter-county titles
- Leinster titles: 1
- All-Irelands: 0
- NHL: 0
- All Stars: 0
- *Inter County team apps and scores correct as of 21:42, 17 March 2022.

Cianan Fahy (born 1998) is an Irish hurler who plays for Galway Senior Championship club Ardrahan and at inter-county level with the Galway senior hurling team. He has lined out as a defender and as a forward.

== Career ==
Fahy first played hurling as a schoolboy with the Gort Community School, with whom he lined out in the Connacht Colleges Championship. He simultaneously lined out with the Ardrahan club at juvenile and underage levels before eventually progressing onto the senior team. Fahy first appeared on the inter-county scene as a member of the Galway minor hurling team that beat Tipperary in the 2015 All-Ireland minor hurling final. He later won a Leinster U21 Championship title. Fahy was drafted onto the Galway senior hurling team in 2022.

== Career statistics ==
As of 5 March 2022.

Team	Year	National League			Leinster		All-Ireland		Total	
Team	Year	Division	Apps	Score	Apps	Score	Apps	Score	Apps	Score
Galway	2022	Division 1A	3	0-02	0	0-00	0	0-00	3	0-02
Career total			3	0-02	0	0-00	0	0-00	3	0-02

== Honours ==
Galway

- Leinster Under-21 Hurling Championship: 2018
- All-Ireland Minor Hurling Championship: 2015
