= Shane Morgan =

Irish hurler

Personal information
- Native name: Seán Ó Morgáin (Irish)
- Born: 2003 (age 22–23) Loughrea, County Galway, Ireland
- Occupation: Student

Sport
- Sport: Hurling
- Position: Right corner-back
Club
- Years: Club
- Loughrea
Club titles
- Galway titles: 1
College
- Years: College
- University of Galway
College titles
- Fitzgibbon titles: 0
Inter-county
- Years: County
- 2024-present: Galway
Inter-county titles
- Leinster titles: 0
- All-Irelands: 0
- NHL: 0
- All Stars: 0

Shane Morgan (born 2003) is an Irish hurler. At club level, he plays with Loughrea and at inter-county level with the Galway senior hurling team.

== Career ==
Morgan played hurling at all levels as a student at St. Raphael's College in Loughrea. He was corner-back on the college's senior team that won the All-Ireland PPS SBHC title in 2019, following a 1–18 to 1–14 win over Castlecomer Community School in the final. He added a Connacht PPS SAHC medal to his collection in 2020, when St Raphael's beat Presentation College, Athenry by 1–10 to 0–09 in the provincial final.

After finishing his second-level education, Morgan later played with University of Galway in the Fitzgibbon Cup and was part of the team beaten by University of Limerick in the 2023 final. At club level, he plays with Loughrea and won a Galway SHC medal in 2024 after a 1–21 to 3–13 defeat of Portumna.

Morgan first appeared on the inter-county scene for Galway as a member of the minor team in 2019. He was at full-forward when Galway beat Kilkenny by 3–14 to 0–12 to claim the All-Ireland MHC title. Morgan was switched to corner-back when Galway retained the title in 2020 following a second consecutive defeat of Kilkenny. He later progressed to the under-20 team. Morgan made his senior team debut in the 2024 Walsh Cup.

== Honours ==
St Raphael's College

- Connacht PPS Senior Hurling Championship: 2020
- All-Ireland PPS Senior B Hurling Championship: 2019
- Connacht PPS Senior B Hurling Championship: 2019

Loughrea

- Galway Senior Hurling Championship: 2024

Galway

- All-Ireland Minor Hurling Championship: 2019, 2020
