= Darragh Langan =

Irish hurler

Personal information
- Native name: Darragh Ó Longáin (Irish)
- Born: 2005 (age 20–21) Limerick, Ireland
- Occupation: Student

Sport
- Sport: Hurling
- Position: Midfield
Club
- Years: Club
- 2023-present: Monaleen
Club titles
- Limerick titles: 0
College
- Years: College
- 2023-present: University of Limerick
College titles
- Fitzgibbon titles: 1
Inter-county
- Years: County
- 2024-present: Limerick
Inter-county titles
- Munster titles: 1
- All-Irelands: 1
- NHL: 1
- All Stars: 0

Darragh Langan (born 2005) is an Irish hurler. At club level he plays with Monaleen and at inter-county level with the Limerick senior hurling team.

== Career ==
Fitzgerald was educated at Castletroy College in Limerick and lined out in all grades of hurling during his time there. He was a Munster PPS SBHC runners-up in 2023. Langan won a Fitzgibbon Cup medal with the University of Limerick in 2026. At club level, he first played hurling at juvenile and underage levels with Monaleen before progressing to adult level.

Langan first appeared on the inter-county scene with Limerick as captain of the minor team in 2022. He later spent three seasons with the under-20 team. Langan made his senior team debut in aNational Hurling League game against Westmeath in February 2024. He was a substitute for Limerick's National League and Munster SHC title wins in 2026.

== Honours ==
University of Limerick

- Fitzgibbon Cup (1): 2026

Limerick

- All-Ireland Senior Hurling Championship (1): 2026
- Munster Senior Hurling Championship (1): 2026
- National Hurling League (1): 2026
- Munster Senior Hurling League (1): 2026
