= Éanna Ryan =

Irish hurler

Personal information
- Native name: Éanna Ó Riain (Irish)
- Born: 16 May 1963 (age 63) Killimordaly, County Galway
- Occupation: Factory worker
- Height: 5 ft 7 in (170 cm)

Sport
- Sport: Hurling
- Position: Forward
Club
- Years: Club
- Killimordaly
Inter-county
- Years: County
- 1980s-1990s: Galway
Inter-county titles
- Connacht titles: 0
- All-Irelands: 2
- NHL: 2
- All Stars: 1

Éanna Ryan (born 16 May 1963) is an Irish former sportsperson. He played hurling with his local club Killimordaly and with the Galway senior inter-county team in the 1980s and 1990s.

Ryan won back-to-back All-Ireland winners' medals with Galway in 1987 and 1988.

His son, Joshua Ryan has been a member of the Galway senior hurling panel since 2025.

== Honours ==
Galway

- All-Ireland Senior Hurling Championship (2): 1987, 1988
- National Hurling League (2): 1986-87, 1988-89

=== Individual ===
Awards

- All-Star (1): 1989
