= Fintan Fitzgerald =

Irish hurler

Personal information
- Native name: Fionntán Mac Gearailt (Irish)
- Born: 2005 (age 20–21) Mungret, County Limerick, Ireland
- Occupation: Student

Sport
- Sport: Hurling
- Position: Left corner-forward
Club
- Years: Club
- 2023-present: Mungret/St Paul's
Club titles
- Limerick titles: 0
College
- Years: College
- 2024-present: University of Limerick
College titles
- Fitzgibbon titles: 1
Inter-county*
Years	County	Apps (scores)
2024-present	Limerick	2 (0-01)
Inter-county titles
- Munster titles: 1
- All-Irelands: 0
- NHL: 1
- All Stars: 0
- *Inter County team apps and scores correct as of 22:16, 05 July 2026.

Fintan Fitzgerald (born 2005) is an Irish hurler. At club level he plays with Mungret/St Paul's and at inter-county level with the Limerick senior hurling team.

== Career ==
Fitzgerald was educated at Ardscoil Rís in Limerick and lined out in all grades of hurling during his time there. He was a Dean Ryan Cup runner-up in 2022. He later captained the school's senior to a defeat by St Joseph's CBS Nenagh in the 2024 Harty Cup final. Fitzgerald won a Fitzgibbon Cup medal with the University of Limerick in 2026.

At club level, Fitzgerald first played hurling at juvenile and underage levels with Mungret/St Paul's. He won a Limerick Prmeier U21HC title in 2023, before captaining the team to the Limerick Premier U20HC title in 2025.

Fitzgerald first appeared on the inter-county scene with Limerick as a member of the minor team in 2022. He later spent three seasons with the under-20 team. Fitzgerald was part of the senior team's pre-season training panel in 2025 before later being released. He was again part of Limerick's pre-season training panel the following year and won a Munster SHL title in 2026. Fitzgerald was retained for the subsequent National Hurling League campaign.

== Honours ==
University of Limerick

- Fitzgibbon Cup (1): 2026

Mungret/St Paul's

- Limerick Premier Under-21 Hurling Championship (1): 2023
- Limerick Premier Under-20 Hurling Championship (1): 2025

Limerick

- National Hurling League (1): 2026
- Munster Senior Hurling League (1): 2026
