= Cillian Trayers =

Irish hurler and Gaelic footballer

Personal information
- Native name: Cillian Treabhair (Irish)
- Born: 2005 (age 20–21) Claregalway, County Galway, Ireland
- Occupation: Student

Sport
- Sport: Hurling
- Position: Full-back
Clubs
- Years: Club
- Claregalway; Turloughmore
Club titles
- Galway titles: 0
College
- Years: College
- ATU Galway
College titles
- Fitzgibbon titles: 0
Inter-county*
Years	County	Apps (scores)
2025-present	Galway	7 (0-00)
Inter-county titles
- Leinster titles: 1
- All-Irelands: 0
- NHL: 0
- All Stars: 0
- *Inter County team apps and scores correct as of 21:36, 7 July 2026.

Cillian Trayers (born 2005) is an Irish dual player. At club level, he plays Gaelic football with Claregalway, hurling with Turloughmore and at inter-county level with the Galway senior hurling team.

== Career ==
Trayers attended Coláiste Bhaile Chláir in Claregalway and played hurling and Gaelic football at all levels during his time there. He lost three Connacht PPS finals across both codes between 2022 and 2024. He later lined out with ATU Galway in the Fitzgibbon Cup. At club level, Trayers plays hurling with Turloughmore and Gaelic football with Claregalway.

At inter-county level, Trayers first played for Galway as a member of the minor football team in 2022. He was at centre-back when Galway beat Mayo by 0–15 to 0–09 to win the All-Ireland MFC title. Trayers was also named on the Minor Team of the Year. He later switched to hurling and progressed to the under-20 team.

Trayers made his senior team debut in a National Hurling League game against Clare in February 2025. He claimed his first senior silverware in 2026, when Galway beat Dublin by 4–29 to 4–15 to win the Leinster SHC title.

== Honours ==
Galway

- Leinster Senior Hurling Championship (1): 2026
- All-Ireland Minor Football Championship (1): 2022
