= Ethan Hurley =

Irish hurler

Personal information
- Native name: Éatan Ó hUrthuile (Irish)
- Born: 2003 (age 22–23) Newcastle West, County Limerick, Ireland

Sport
- Sport: Hurling
- Position: Centre-back
Club
- Years: Club
- Newcastle West
Club titles
- Limerick titles: 0
College
- Years: College
- TUS Midwest
College titles
- Fitzgibbon titles: 0
Inter-county*
Years	County	Apps (scores)
2024-	Limerick	0 (0-00)
Inter-county titles
- Munster titles: 0
- All-Irelands: 0
- NHL: 1
- All Stars: 0
- *Inter County team apps and scores correct as of 22:46, 2 March 2024.

Ethan Hurley (born 2003) is an Irish hurler. At club level he plays with Newcastle West and at inter-county level he lines out with the Limerick senior hurling team.

== Career ==
Hurley first played hurling and Gaelic football at juvenile and underage levels with the Newcastle West club. He eventually progressed to adult levels and won a Limerick PJAFC title in 2023. Hurley also lined out with TUS Midwest in the Fitzgibbon Cup.

Hurley first appeared on the inter-county scene with Limerick during a two-year stint with the Limerick minor hurling team. He won consecutive Munster MHC titles in 2019 and 2020. Hurley immediately progressed to the under-20 team and was at centre-back when Kilkenny beat Limerick in the 2022 All-Ireland under-20 final. His third and final season in the under-20 grade saw him appointed team captain.

After being added to the Limerick senior hurling team pre-season training panel, Hurley made his National League debut in a defeat of Antrim in 2024.

== Honours ==
Newcastle West

- Limerick Premier Junior A Football Championship: 2023

Limerick

- Munster Under-20 Hurling Championship: 2022
- Munster Minor Hurling Championship: 2019, 2020

Sporting positions
Preceded by Jimmy Quilty	Limerick under-20 hurling team captain 2023	Succeeded by Cian Scully
