= Jason Rabbitte =

Irish hurler (born 2006)

Personal information
- Native name: Íason Ó Coinín (Irish)
- Born: 2006 (age 19–20) Athenry, County Galway, Ireland
- Occupation: Student
- Height: 6 ft 4 in (193 cm)

Sport
- Sport: Hurling
- Position: Full-forward
Club
- Years: Club
- 2024-present: Athenry
Club titles
- Galway titles: 0
College
- Years: College
- 2025-present: ATU Galway
College titles
- Fitzgibbon titles: 0
Inter-county*
Years	County	Apps (scores)
2025-present	Galway	6 (2-10)
Inter-county titles
- Leinster titles: 1
- All-Irelands: 0
- NHL: 0
- All Stars: 1
- *Inter County team apps and scores correct as of 10:41, 1 November 2026.

Jason Rabbitte (born 2006) is an Irish hurler. At club level he plays with Athenry and at inter-county level with the Galway senior hurling team.

== Career ==
Rabbitte played hurling at all grades as a student at the Presentation College in Athenry. He was part of the school's senior hurling team that won Connacht PPS SAHC titles 2023 and 2025, when he was team captain. He later lined out with the ATU Galway freshers' team. At club level, Rabbitte was part of the Athenry team that won the Galway SBHC title in 2024.

At inter-county level, Rabbitte first appeared for Galway as part of the minor team beaten by Clare in the 2023 All-Ireland MHC final. He was later named on the GAA Minor Hurling Team of the Year. Rabbitte immediately progressed to the under-20 team.

Rabbitte first appeared for the senior team when he was included amongst the substitutes for Galway's game against Wexford in the 2025 Leinster SHC. He made his debut in Galway's 2026 National Hurling League opening round defeat by Tipperary. Rabbitte later won a Leinster SHC medal, following a 4–29 to 4–15 win over Dublin.

== Personal life ==
Rabbitte's father, Joe Rabbitte, was a two-time All-Star-winner as a member of the Galway senior team.

== Career statistics ==
As of 4 July 2026

Team	Year	National League			Leinster		All-Ireland		Total	
Team	Year	Division	Apps	Score	Apps	Score	Apps	Score	Apps	Score
Galway	2025	Division 1A	0	0-00	0	0-00	0	0-00	0	0-00
Galway	2026	Division 1A	7	0-09	5	2-07	1	0-03	13	2-19
Career total			7	0-09	5	2-07	1	0-03	13	2-19

== Honours ==
Presentation College, Athenry

- Connacht Colleges Senior Hurling Championship: 2023, 2025

Athenry

- Galway Senior B Hurling Championship: 2024

Galway

- Leinster Senior Hurling Championship: 2026
- Leinster Under-20 Hurling Championship: 2026
- Leinster Minor Hurling Championship: 2023

Awards

- All Stars Young Hurler of the Year (1): 2026
- GAA GPA All Stars Awards (1): 2026
