= Cathal Mannion =

Galway hurler (born 1994)

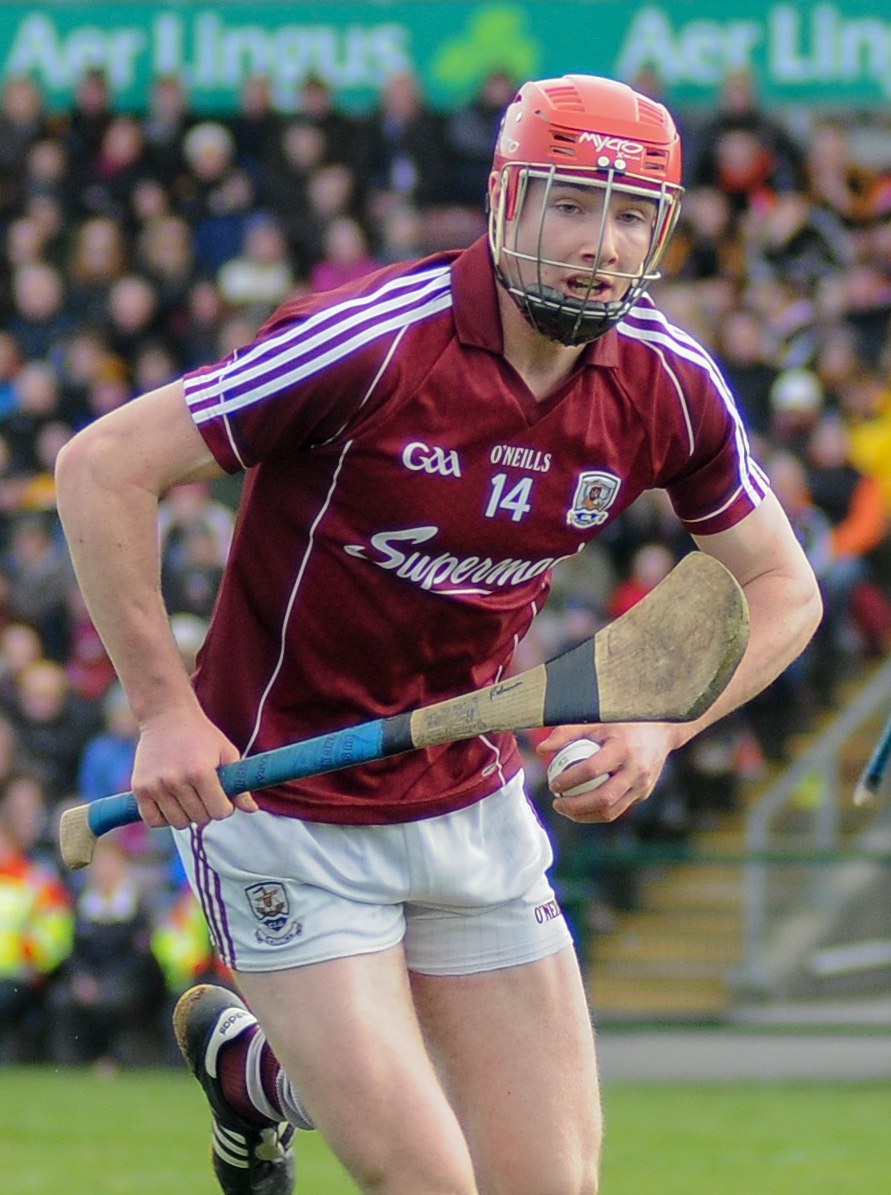
- Mannion with Galway in 2015

Personal information
- Native name: Cathal Ó Mainnín (Irish)
- Born: 22 October 1994 (age 32) Ballinasloe, County Galway, Ireland
- Height: 1.88 m (6 ft 2 in)

Sport
- Sport: Hurling
- Position: Left corner-forward
Clubs
- Years: Club
- Ahascragh-Fohenagh; Caltra
Club titles
- Galway titles: 0
College
- Years: College
- 2013–2018: NUI Galway
College titles
- Fitzgibbon titles: 0
Inter-county*
Years	County	Apps (scores)
2014–	Galway	63 (8–195)
Inter-county titles
- Leinster titles: 3
- All-Irelands: 1
- NHL: 2
- All Stars: 2
- *Inter County team apps and scores correct as of match played 21 June 2025.

Cathal Mannion (born 22 October 1994) is an Irish hurler who plays for Galway Senior Championship club Ahascragh-Fohenagh and at inter-county level with the Galway senior hurling team. He usually lines out as a left corner-forward.

== Playing career ==
=== Ahascragh-Fohenagh ===
Mannion joined the Ahascragh-Fohenagh club at a young age and played in all grades at juvenile and underage levels before eventually joining the club's top adult team.

On 21 October 2016, Mannion scored a goal when Ahascragh-Fohenagh defeated Ballinderreen by 2–15 to 0–08 to win the Galway Intermediate Championship. He later scored 2-11 when Ahascragh-Fohenagh won the Connacht Championship on 14 November following a 2–20 to 0–13 defeat of Ballyhaunis in the final. On 18 February 2017, Mannion top scored for Ahascragh-Fohenagh with five points when they suffered a 2–15 to 0–06 defeat by Carrickshock in the All-Ireland final.

=== Galway ===
==== Minor and under-21 ====
Mannion first lined out for Galway as a member of the minor team during the 2011 All-Ireland Championship. He won an All-Ireland medal as a non-playing substitute on 4 September following Galway's 1–21 to 1–12 defeat of Dublin in the final.

On 28 July 2012, Mannion made his first appearance for the Galway minor team. He scored two points from midfield in a 4–20 to 2–11 defeat of Wexford in the All-Ireland quarter-final.

Mannion was drafted onto the Galway under-21 team for the 2013 All-Ireland Championship. He made his first appearance for the team on 24 August and scored three points from full-forward in a 1–16 to 0–07 defeat by Clare. He played with the under-21 team for three years.

==== Senior ====
Mannion was still eligible for the under-21 grade when he was selected for the Galway senior team. He made his first appearance for the team on 16 February 2014 and scored four points from right corner-forward in a 0–28 to 1–12 defeat of Dublin in the National League. Mannion was also included on Galway's starting fifteen for the Leinster Championship. He made his debut on 1 June in a 1–22 to 0–23 defeat of Laois.

On 5 July 2015, Mannion lined out in his first Leinster final. He scored a point from right corner-forward in the 1–23 to 2–17 defeat by Kilkenny. Mannion was switched to left corner-forward for the All-Ireland final against Kilkenny on 6 September. He was held scoreless in the 1–22 to 1–18 defeat. Mannion ended the season by receiving an All-Star award.

On 3 July 2016, Mannion scored five points in Galway's 1–26 to 0–22 defeat by Kilkenny in the Leinster final.

Mannion claimed his first silverware with the Galway senior team on 22 April 2017. He scored 1-01 when Galway won the National League title after a 3–21 to 0–14 defeat of Tipperary in the final. Mannion subsequently missed Galway's 0–29 to 1–17 defeat of Wexford in the Leinster final because of an ankle injury. He was back on the starting fifteen for the All-Ireland final against Waterford on 3 September. Mannion scored two points from left corner-forward in the 0–26 to 2–17 victory in what was Galway's first All-Ireland Championship in 29 years. He ended the season by being receiving a second All-Star nomination.

On 1 July 2018, Mannion scored three points for Galway in their 0-18 apiece draw with Kilkenny in the Leinster final. The replay a week later saw him win his first Leinster Championship medal on the field of play after Galway retained the title with a 1–28 to 3–15 victory. On 19 August, Mannion was at left corner-forward when Galway faced Limerick in the All-Ireland final. He was held scoreless throughout the 3–16 to 2–18 defeat. Mannion ended the season by being nominated for a third All-Star award.

== Career statistics ==
As of match played 21 June 2025

Team	Year	National League			Leinster		All-Ireland		Total	
Team	Year	Division	Apps	Score	Apps	Score	Apps	Score	Apps	Score
Galway	2014	Division 1A	7	1-12	3	0-02	1	0-02	11	1-16
Galway	2015	Division 1A	6	2-13	4	3-11	3	0-12	13	5-36
Galway	2016	Division 1A	6	0-10	3	0-07	2	0-01	11	0-18
Galway	2017	Division 1B	6	2-18	2	0-03	2	0-02	10	2-23
Galway	2018	Division 1B	6	1-17	6	0-13	3	0-05	15	1-35
Galway	2019	Division 1B	6	1-15	4	0-21	—		10	1-36
Galway	2020	Division 1A	5	1-12	2	0-03	2	1-04	9	2-19
Galway	2021	Division 1A	5	1-08	1	0-01	1	1-00	7	2-09
Galway	2022	Division 1A	4	0-10	6	0-18	2	0-08	12	0-36
Galway	2023	Division 1A			5	0-07	2	1-01	7	1-08
Galway	2024	Division 1A			3	0-07	—		3	0-07
Galway	2025	Division 1A			5	2-54	1	0-13	6	2-67
Total			51	9-115	44	5-147	19	3-48	113	17-310

== Honours ==
=== Player ===
Galway

- All-Ireland Senior Hurling Championship (1): 2017
- Leinster Senior Hurling Championship (2): 2017, 2018
- National Hurling League (2): 2017, 2021

Ahascragh-Fohenagh

- Connacht Intermediate Club Hurling Championship (1): 2016
- Galway Intermediate Hurling Championship (1): 2016

=== Individual ===
Awards

- GAA GPA All Stars Awards (2): 2015, 2025
- The Sunday Game Team of the Year (1): 2025
