= Éanna Murphy (Galway hurler) =

Irish hurler (born 1998)

Personal information
- Native name: Éanna Ó Bigo (Irish)
- Born: 1998 (age 27–28) Ballinakill, County Galway, Ireland
- Occupation: Student
- Height: 5 ft 11 in (180 cm)

Sport
- Sport: Hurling
- Position: Goalkeeper
Club
- Years: Club
- Tommy Larkin's
Club titles
- Galway titles: 0
College
- Years: College
- Galway-Mayo Institute of Technology
Inter-county*
Years	County	Apps (scores)
2020-present	Galway	4 (0-00)
Inter-county titles
- Leinster titles: 0
- All-Irelands: 0
- NHL: 0
- All Stars: 0
- *Inter County team apps and scores correct as of 17:12, 4 January 2021.

Éanna Murphy (born 1998) is an Irish hurler who plays as a goalkeeper for club side Tommy Larkin's and at inter-county level with the Galway senior hurling team.

== Career statistics ==
As of 29 November 2020

Team	Year	National League			Leinster		All-Ireland		Total	
Team	Year	Division	Apps	Score	Apps	Score	Apps	Score	Apps	Score
Galway	2020	Division 1A	3	0-00	2	0-00	2	0-00	7	0-00
Total			3	0-00	2	0-00	2	0-00	7	0-00

== Honours ==
Tommy Larkin

- Galway Under-21 B Hurling Championship (1): 2019

Galway

- Leinster Under-21 Hurling Championship (1): 2018
