= Thomas Monaghan (hurler) =

Irish hurler

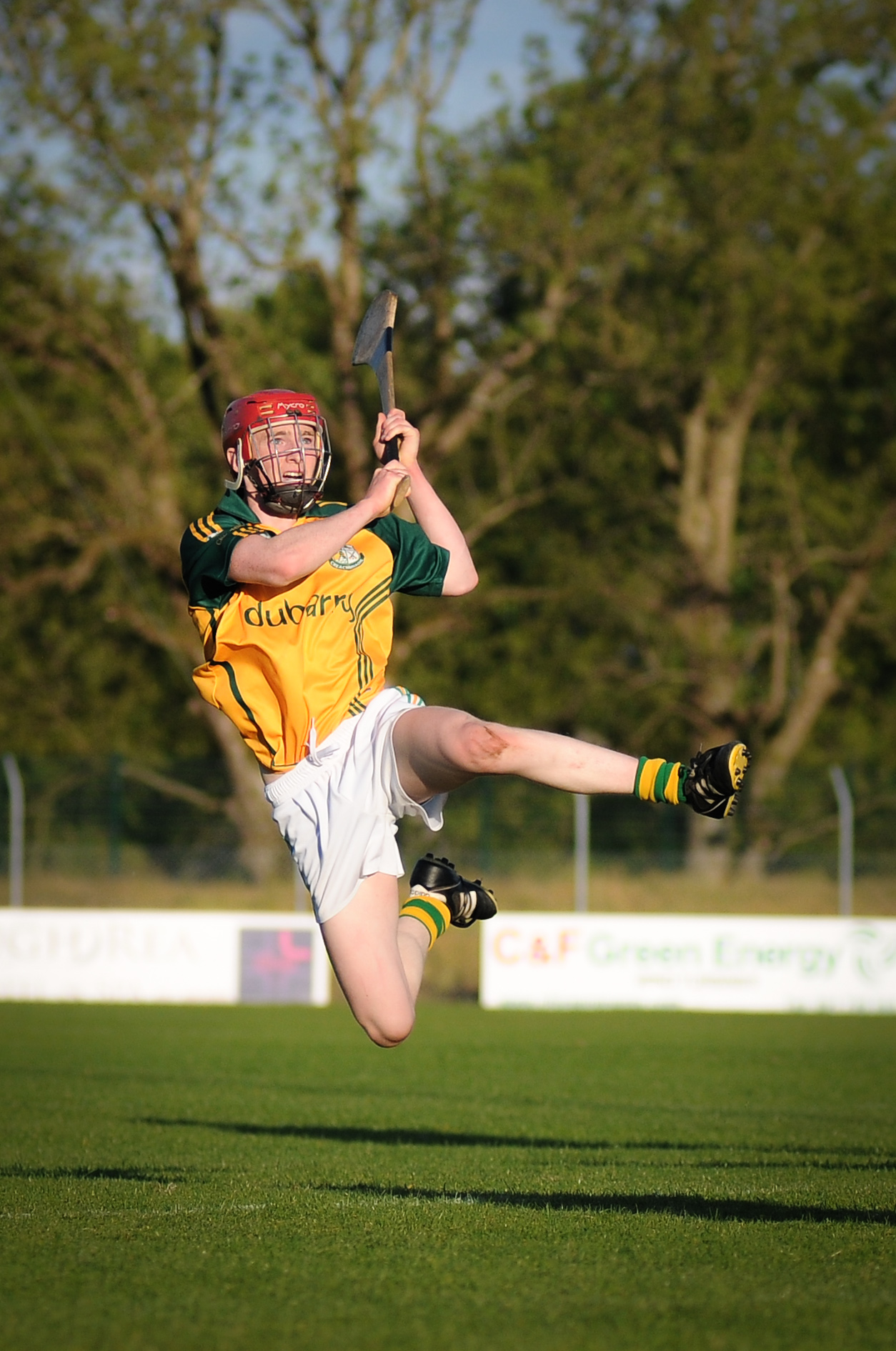
- Thomas Monaghan in 2015

Personal information
- Native name: Tomás Ó Manacháin (Irish)
- Born: 1997 (age 28–29) Craughwell, County Galway, Ireland
- Occupation: Teacher

Sport
- Sport: Hurling
- Position: Left wing-forward
Club
| Years | Club | Apps (scores) |
| 2014–present | Craughwell | ? (1-60) |
Club titles
- Galway titles: 0
College
- Years: College
- 2015-present: Mary Immaculate College
College titles
- Fitzgibbon titles: 1
Inter-county
| Years | County | Apps (scores) |
| 2017– | Galway | 2 (0-2) |
Inter-county titles
- Leinster titles: 3
- All-Irelands: 1
- NHL: 1
- All Stars: 1

Thomas Monaghan (born 1997) is an Irish hurler who currently plays as left wing-forward for the Galway senior team.

Born in Craughwell, County Galway, and his occupation is a teacher in Craughwell N.S., Monaghan first played competitive hurling at juvenile and underage levels with the Craughwell club. He was educated at and played hurling with Athenry Vocational School before studying at Mary Immaculate College. Here Monaghan won back-to-back Fitzgibbon Cup medals.

Monaghan made his debut on the inter-county scene at the age of seventeen when he was selected for the Galway minor team. His tenure with the minor team culminated with the winning of an All-Ireland medal in 2015. He subsequently joined the Galway under-21 team but has so far been an All-Ireland runner-up in this grade. Monaghan made his senior debut for Galway during the 2017 Walsh Cup. Since then he has won one All-Ireland medal, two Leinster medals and one National Hurling League medal.

== Career statistics ==
As of match played 3 September 2017.

| Team | Year | Walsh Cup | | National League | | Leinster | | All-Ireland | | Total | |
| Team | Year | Apps | Score | Apps | Score | Apps | Score | Apps | Score | Apps | Score |
|---|---|---|---|---|---|---|---|---|---|---|---|
| Galway | 2017 | 5 | 0-07 | 6 | 0-07 | 2 | 0-02 | 0 | 0-00 | 13 | 0-16 |
| Total | | 5 | 0-07 | 6 | 0-07 | 2 | 0-02 | 0 | 0-00 | 13 | 0-16 |

== Honours ==
Mary Immaculate College

- Fitzgibbon Cup (2): 2016, 2017

Galway

- All-Ireland Senior Hurling Championship (1): 2017
- Leinster Senior Hurling Championship (3): 2017, 2018, 2026
- National Hurling League (1): 2017
- All-Ireland Minor Hurling Championship (1): 2015

Awards

- GAA GPA All Stars Awards (1): 2026
