= Joshua Ryan (hurler) =

Irish hurler

Personal information
- Occupation: Student

Sport
- Sport: Hurling
- Position: Right corner-back
Club
- Years: Club
- Clarinbridge
College titles
- Fitzgibbon titles: 0
Inter-county
- Years: County
- 2025-present: Galway
Inter-county titles
- Leinster titles: 1
- All-Irelands: 0
- NHL: 0
- All Stars: 0

Joshua Ryan is an Irish hurler. At club level, he plays with Clarinbridge and at inter-county level with the Galway senior hurling team.

He is the son of former Galway hurler Éanna Ryan who won two All-Ireland titles with Galway in 1987 and 1988.

== Career ==
On 22 March 2025, Ryan made his debut for Galway against Cork in the 2025 National Hurling League.

On 6 June 2026, Ryan came on as a substitute as Galway defeated Dublin to win the 2026 Leinster Hurling Championship.

== Honours ==
Galway

- Leinster Senior Hurling Championship (1): 2026,
