= Darragh Neary =

Irish hurler

Personal information
- Native name: Darragh Ó Náraigh (Irish)
- Born: 2006 (age 19–20) Castlegar, County Galway, Ireland

Sport
- Sport: Hurling
- Position: Left wing-forward
Club
- Years: Club
- 2022-present: Castlegar
Club titles
- Galway titles: 0
College
- Years: College
- 2022-2026: University of Galway
College titles
- Fitzgibbon titles: 0
Inter-county
- Years: County
- 2026-: Galway
Inter-county titles
- Leinster titles: 1
- All-Irelands: 0
- NHL: 0
- All Stars: 0

Darragh Neary (born 2004) is an Irish hurler. At club level he plays with Castlegar and at inter-county level with the Galway senior hurling team.

== Career ==
Neary first played hurling at juvenile and underage levels with the Castlegar club, before progressing to adult level. He won a Galway U20 A1HC title in 2024, following a 2–17 to 0–15 win over Athenry in the final. Neary also lined out with the University of Galway in the Fitzgibbon Cup.

At inter-county level, Neary first appeared for Galway during a two-year tenure with the minor team. He was a member of the extended panel in 2020, when Galway beat Kilkenny to win the All-Ireland MHC title. Neary was at wing-forward when Cork beat Galway in the 2021 All-Ireland MHC final. He later progressed to the under-20 team.

Neary made his senior team debut in January 2026, when he lined out at wing-back in Galway's 2026 National Hurling League opening round defeat by Tipperary. He later won a Leinster SHC medal, following a 4–29 to 4–15 win over Dublin.

== Honours ==
Castlegar

- Galway Under-20 A1 Hurling Championship (1): 2024

Galway

- Leinster Senior Hurling Championship (1): 2026
- All-Ireland Minor Hurling Championship (1): 2020
- Leinster Minor Hurling Championship (2): 2020, 2021
