= Daithí Burke =

Galway hurler and Corofin Gaelic footballer

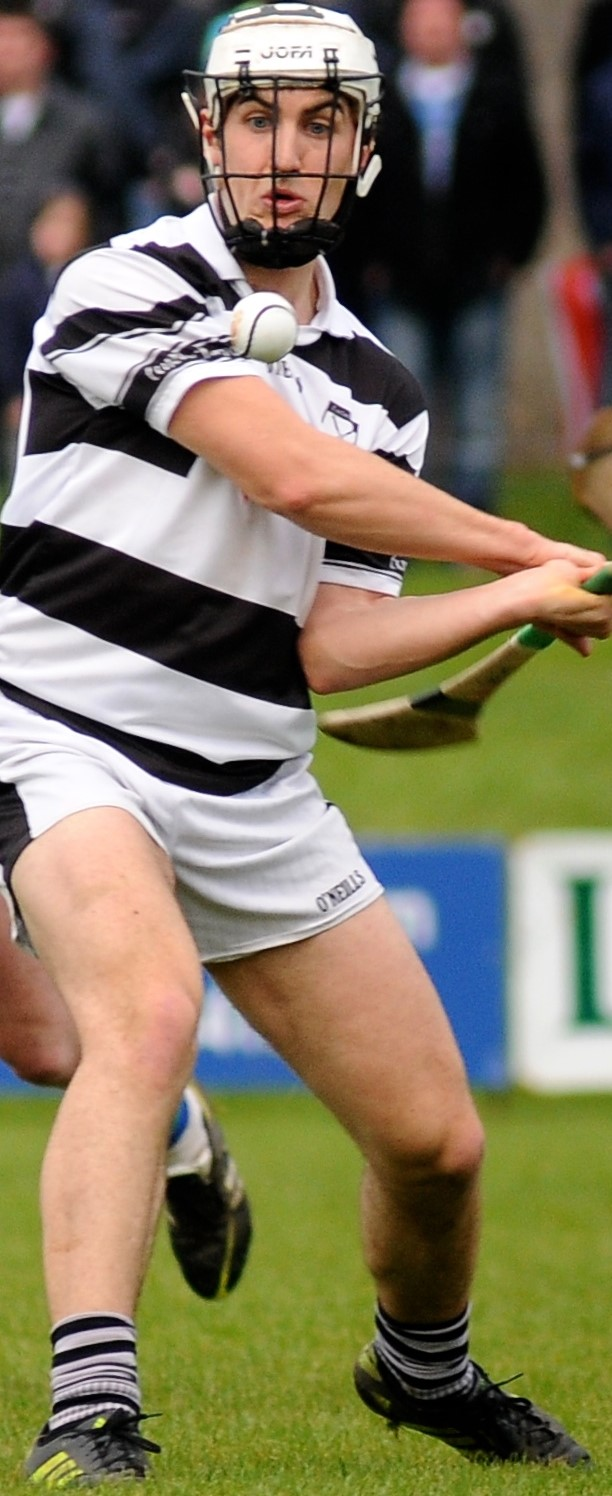

Personal information
- Native name: Daithí de Búrca (Irish)
- Born: 16 November 1992 (age 33) Galway, Ireland
- Occupation: AIB bank official
- Height: 1.85 m (6 ft 1 in)

Sport
- Sport: Hurling
- Position: Full Back
Clubs
- Years: Club
- Turloughmore (H); Corofin (F)
Club titles
| | Football | Hurling |
| Galway titles | 8 | |
| Connacht titles | 5 | |
| All-Ireland titles | 4 | |
Inter-county*
| Years | County | Apps (scores) |
| 2014– | Galway | 44 (0–0) |
Inter-county titles
- All-Irelands: 1
- NHL: 2
- All Stars: 5
- *Inter County team apps and scores correct as of match played 18 June 2022.

Daithí Burke (born 16 November 1992) is an Irish hurler and Gaelic footballer who plays at senior level for the Galway county hurling team and for his clubs Turloughmore and Corofin.

Burke made his debut for Galway against Laois, and was part of the team that reached the 2015 All-Ireland Senior Hurling Championship Final after defeating Tipperary in the semi-final.

On 3 September 2017, Burke started at full-back for Galway as they won their first All-Ireland Senior Hurling Championship in 29 years against Waterford.

He has also played for NUI Galway.

In February 2022, Burke was named captain of the Galway senior hurling team.

== Career statistics ==
As of match played 18 June 2022.

| Team | Year | National League | | | Leinster | | All-Ireland | | Total | |
| Team | Year | Division | Apps | Score | Apps | Score | Apps | Score | Apps | Score |
|---|---|---|---|---|---|---|---|---|---|---|
| Galway | 2014 | Division 1A | 7 | 0–0 | 3 | 0–0 | 1 | 0–0 | 11 | 0–0 |
| Galway | 2015 | Division 1A | - | | 3 | 0–0 | 3 | 0–0 | 6 | 0–0 |
| Galway | 2016 | Division 1A | 3 | 0–0 | 3 | 0–0 | 2 | 0–0 | 8 | 0–0 |
| Galway | 2017 | Division 1B | 6 | 0–2 | 3 | 0–0 | 2 | 0–0 | 11 | 0–2 |
| Galway | 2018 | Division 1B | 1 | 0–0 | 6 | 0–0 | 3 | 0–0 | 10 | 0–0 |
| Galway | 2019 | Division 1B | - | | 3 | 0–0 | - | | 3 | 0–0 |
| Galway | 2020 | Division 1A | - | | 1 | 0–0 | 2 | 0–0 | 3 | 0–0 |
| Galway | 2021 | Division 1A | 3 | 0–2 | 1 | 0–0 | 1 | 0–0 | 5 | 0–2 |
| Galway | 2022 | Division 1A | 5 | 0–0 | 6 | 0–0 | 1 | 0–0 | 12 | 0–0 |
| Total | | | 25 | 0–4 | 29 | 0–0 | 15 | 0–0 | 69 | 0–4 |

== Honours ==
Hurling

- All-Ireland Minor Hurling Championship (1): 2009
- National Hurling League Division 1 (2): 2017, 2021
- Leinster Senior Hurling Championship (3): 2017, 2018, 2026
- All-Ireland Senior Hurling Championship (1): 2017

Football

- Galway Senior Football Championship (8): 2011, 2013, 2014, 2015, 2016, 2017, 2018, 2019
- Connacht Senior Club Football Championship (5): 2014, 2016, 2017,2018, 2019
- All-Ireland Senior Club Football Championship (4): 2015, 2018, 2019, 2020
- Connacht Under-21 Football Championship (1): 2013
- All-Ireland Under-21 Football Championship (1): 2013

Awards

- The Sunday Game Hurling Team of the Year (1): 2018
- GAA GPA All Stars Awards (5): 2015, 2016, 2017, 2018, 2020
