= Cork–Offaly hurling rivalry =

Hurling rivalry between Cork and Offaly

Cork–Offaly
- Teams: Cork; Offaly
- First meeting: 2 September 1984
- Latest meeting: 21 June 2026
- Next meeting: TBA

Statistics
- Total meetings: 8
- All-time series (Championship only): Cork 7-1 Offaly
- Largest victory: Cork 6-25 – 2-11 Offaly (2026)

The Cork–Offaly rivalry is a hurling rivalry between Cork and Offaly. The fixture is an irregular one due to both teams playing in separate provinces.

== Roots ==
=== History ===
For the first one hundred-year history of the Gaelic Athletic Association, Cork and Offaly never crossed paths in the championship. Offaly, regarded as one of the minnows of hurling, failed to emerge from the Leinster series until 1980 while the absence of a "back door system" or expanded qualifiers series meant that a championship meeting between the two teams was unlikely.

The centenary year All-Ireland final provided the first ever championship clash between Cork and Offaly. Since then, the sides have met at irregular intervals in All-Ireland semi-finals and qualifiers.

=== Statistics ===
Up to date as of 2023 season

Team	All-Ireland	Provincial	National League	Total
Cork	30	54	14	98
Offaly	4	6	1	11
Combined	34	60	15	109

== All-time results ==
Offaly win
Cork win

Date	Winners	Score	Runners-up	Venue	Competition
2 September 1984	Cork	3-16 - 1-12	Offaly	Semple Stadium	AISHC final
9 August 1999	Cork	0-19 - 0-16	Offaly	Croke Park	AISHC semi-final
6 August 2000	Offaly	0-19 - 0-15	Cork	Croke Park	AISHC semi-final
7 July 2007	Cork	1-27 - 0-11	Offaly	Páirc Uí Chaoimh	AISHC qualifiers
4 July 2009	Cork	3-19 - 1-12	Offaly	O'Connor Park	AISHC qualifiers
25 June 2011	Cork	2-17 - 2-16	Offaly	Páirc Uí Chaoimh	AISHC qualifiers
9 July 2012	Cork	1-26 - 2-16	Offaly	Páirc Uí Chaoimh	AISHC qualifiers
21 June 2026	Cork	6-25 - 2-11	Offaly	Semple Stadium	AISHC quarter-final
