= Micheál Donoghue =

Irish hurler and manager

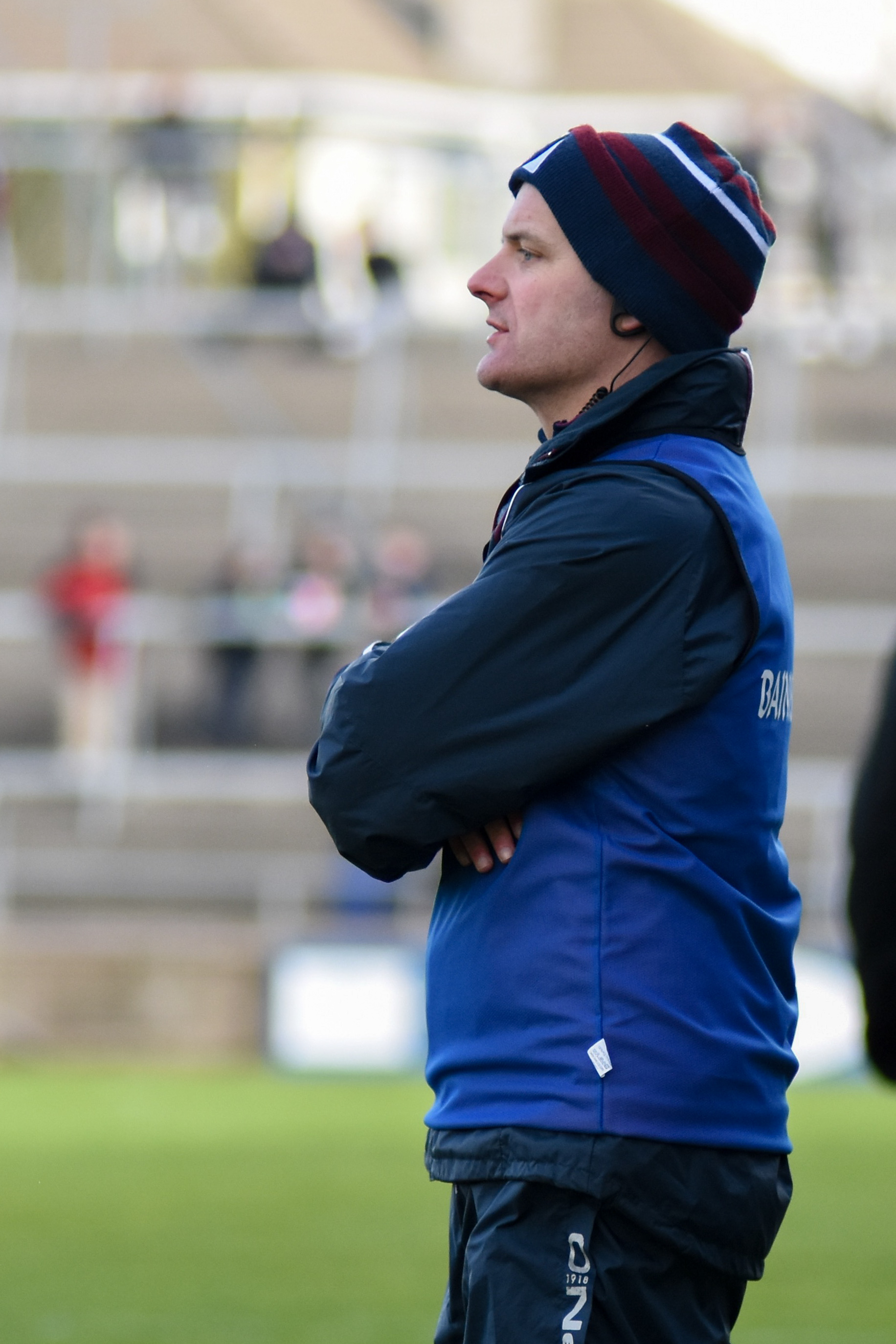

Personal information
- Native name: Micheál Ó Donnchú (Irish)
- Born: 7 September 1974 (age 52) Clarinbridge, County Galway, Ireland
- Occupation: Regional Manager BMW FS

Sport
- Sport: Hurling
- Position: Left wing-back
Club
- Years: Club
- Clarinbridge
Club titles
- Galway titles: 1
- Connacht titles: 1
- All-Ireland Titles: 0
Inter-county
Years	County	Apps (scores)
1993–1996	Galway	4 (0–01)
Inter-county titles
- Connacht titles: 1
- All-Irelands: 0
- NHL: 1
- All Stars: 0

Micheál Donoghue (born 7 September 1974) is an Irish hurling manager and former player. He is the current manager of the Galway senior hurling team.

Donoghue was previously manager of the Galway senior hurling team from the end of 2015 until the summer of 2019.

Donoghue began his hurling career at club level with Clarinbridge. After breaking onto the club's top adult team he enjoyed his greatest success almost a decade later when he captained the club to the 2001 Galway Senior Championship.

At inter-county level, Donoghue, along with his twin brother Liam, was part of the successful Galway minor team that won the All-Ireland Championship in 1992 before later winning an All-Ireland Championship with the under-21 team in 1993. He also joined the Galway senior team in 1993. Donoghue's senior career was hampered by injuries, however, he made a number of National League and Championship appearances in a career that ended with his last game in 1996. His final season with the team saw him claim National League and Connacht Championship medals.

After retiring as a player, Donoghue served as a selector with the Galway under-21 team, with whom he won All-Ireland Championships in 2005 and 2007. He subsequently turned to management with his home club Clarinbridge and steered the team to the All-Ireland Club Championship in 2011. An unsuccessful spell as Turloughmore manager was followed by a two-year tenure as statistician with the Tipperary senior hurling team. Donoghue was appointed manager of the Galway senior team in December 2015. In his second season in charge he guided the team to a clean sweep of All-Ireland, Leinster Championship and National League titles.

== Playing career ==
=== Clarinbridge ===
Donoghue joined the Clarinbridge club at a young age and played in all grades at juvenile and underage levels. On 14 November 1992, he scored a point from left wing-back when Clarinbridge drew 1-08 to 2-05 with Castlegar in the Galway Minor Championship final. Donoghue lined out in the same position for the replay a week later and collected a winners' medal following a 1-09 to 1-05 victory.

Donoghue subsequently progressed onto the Clarinbridge under-21 and senior teams. On 30 November 1997, he was named at centre-back when Clarinbridge lost out to Sarsfields by 1-11 to 1-06 in the final of the Galway Senior Championship.

On 21 October 2001, Donoghue captained the club from centre-back to their very first Galway Senior Championship title following an 0-18 to 2-11 defeat of Athenry. Donoghue won a Connacht Club Championship medal on 18 November following a 2-18 to 1-06 defeat of Four Roads in the final. On 17 March 2002, he captained Clarinbridge to a 2-10 to 1-05 All-Ireland final defeat by Birr.

A series of injuries brought Donoghue's club career to an end at the age of 28.

=== Galway ===
==== Minor and under-21 ====
Donoghue was drafted onto the Galway minor team in advance of the 1991 All-Ireland Championship. He made his first appearance on 9 August when he lined out at left corner-back in a 1-16 apiece draw with Kilkenny in the All-Ireland semi-final. Donoghue was switched to left wing-back for the All-Ireland final against Waterford on 8 September. He ended the game with a winners' medal following a 1-13 to 2-04 victory.

After joining the Galway under-21 team, Donoghue made his first appearance on 21 August 1993. He lined out at left wing-back in a 1-09 to 1-07 defeat of Cork in the All-Ireland semi-final. Donoghue retained his position on the starting fifteen for the All-Ireland final against Kilkenny on 3 October. He collected a winners' medal following the 2-09 to 3-03 victory.

On 11 September 1994, Donoghue lined out in a second successive All-Ireland final. He was selected at left wing-back for the 3-10 to 1-11 defeat by Kilkenny.

==== Senior ====
Donoghue was added to the Galway senior panel prior to the start of the 1993-94 National League. He made his first appearance on 31 October 1994 when he lined out at left wing-back in a 2-15 to 2-09 defeat of Down. On 7 May 1994, Donoghue was named amongst the substitutes when Galway faced Tipperary in the National League final. He was introduced for Tom Helebert in the 2-14 to 0-12 defeat. Donoghue made his first championship appearance in a 2-21 to 2-06 defeat of Roscommon in the All-Ireland quarter-final on 17 July.

Donoghue suffered a series of injuries which hindered his inter-county career. A broken collarbone was followed by surgery to address a bulging disc in his lower.

On 12 May 1996, Donoghue lined out at left wing-back when Galway qualified for the National League final. He ended the game with a winners' medal following the 2-10 to 2-08 defeat of Tipperary. Donoghue won a Connacht Championship medal on 6 July after Galway's 3-19 to 2-10 defeat of Roscommon in the final. Further injuries and surgeries brought his inter-county career to an end shortly after.

== Managerial career ==
=== Clarinbridge ===
After being appointed manager of the Clarinbridge senior hurling team in 2009, Donoghue immediately brought success to the club. Under his guidance, the team qualified for the Galway Senior Championship final on 31 October 2010, however, the game ended in a 2-11 to 1-14 draw with Loughrea. Clarinbridge defeated Loughrea by 0-18 to 0-15 in the replay on 21 November. Donoghue subsequently guided Clarinbridge to the All-Ireland Club Championship title on 17 March 2011 following a 2-18 to 0-12 defeat of O'Loughlin Gaels.

=== Turloughmore ===
Donoghue took charge of the Turloughmore senior hurling team in 2012. In his first season in charge he guided the team to a semi-final appearance in the Galway Senior Championship, however, his side suffered a 1-12 to 0-07 defeat by Loughrea.

Donoghue's second season as Turloughmore manager ended with a quarter-final defeat by Beagh.

=== Tipperary ===
Donoghue was drafted in by Eamon O'Shea to help out with a variety of coaching and statistics roles with the Tipperary senior hurling team in 2014. In his second and final season with the team Tipperary suffered a 0-26 to 3-16 defeat by Galway in the All-Ireland semi-final. Donoghue later said: "It was hard, very hard but like any job when you are asked to do something you just focus on the job that you are given. I suppose if you were going to get beaten then Galway were going to be the team you wanted to succeed and push on."

=== Galway ===
==== Under-21 ====
Donoghue became a selector to the Galway under-21 team in 2005 under manager Vincent Mullins. As part of the management team he help guide the team to the All-Ireland title following a 1-15 to 1-14 defeat of Kilkenny on 18 September 2005.

Galway surrendered their All-Ireland title at the first hurdle in 2006, however, Donoghue was retained as a selector for a third season the following year. On 8 September 2007, Galway won a second All-Ireland title in three years following a 5-11 to 0-12 defeat of Dublin in the final.

Donoghue's tenure as a selector ended on 24 August 2008 following a 2-14 to 1-13 defeat by Kilkenny in the All-Ireland semi-final.

==== Senior ====
In December 2015 Donoghue succeeded Anthony Cunningham as Galway manager starting in the 2016 Season.

On 3 April 2016, Galway lost to Cork in a Division 1A Relegation Play-Off by 2-22 to 0-25 and were relegated to Division 1B for 2017. On 3 July 2016, Galway lost the Leinster Final to Kilkenny on a 0-22 to 1-26 scoreline after having a three-point lead at half-time.

On 22 April 2017, Galway won the 2017 National Hurling League after a 3-21 to 0-14 win against Tipperary in the final. On 2 July 2017, Galway won their second ever Leinster Senior Hurling title after a 0-29 to 1-17 win against Wexford in the final. On 6 August 2017, Galway qualified for the 2017 All-Ireland Senior Hurling Championship Final after a one-point victory over Tipperary in the semi-final. On 3 September 2017, Donoghue and his Galway team were crowned All Ireland Champions after defeating Waterford on a 0-26 to 2-17 scoreline in the final. This was Galway's first All Ireland senior hurling title since 1988.

In November 2018, Donoghue was ratified for a further two years as Galway manager.

In August 2019, Donoghue stepped down as Galway manager.

=== Dublin ===
In an unexpected announcement issued on the morning of 22 August 2022, Donoghue was appointed on a three-year term as Dublin senior hurling team manager.

Donoghue stepped down as Dublin manager on 8 August 2024, just under seven weeks after his side were knocked out of the All-Ireland Senior Hurling Championship at the quarter-final stage by eventual runners-up Cork.

=== Galway ===
In August 2024, Donoghue was re-appointed as Galway senior hurling manager on a four year term. On 6 June 2026, Galway defeated Dublin to win the 2026 Leinster Hurling Championship. It was a third Leinster title for Donoghue and his first since returning as manager.

== Honours ==
=== Player ===
Clarinbridge

- Galway Senior Hurling Championship (1): 2001
- Galway Minor Hurling Championship (1): 1992

Galway

- Connacht Senior Hurling Championship (1): 1996
- National Hurling League (1): 1995-96
- All-Ireland Under-21 Hurling Championship (1): 1993
- All-Ireland Minor Hurling Championship (1): 1992

Connacht

- Railway Cup (1): 1994

=== Manager ===
Clarinbridge

- All-Ireland Senior Club Hurling Championship (1): 2011
- Galway Senior Hurling Championship (1): 2010

Galway

- All-Ireland Senior Hurling Championship (1): 2017
- Leinster Senior Hurling Championship (3): 2017, 2018, 2026
- National Hurling League (1): 2017
- All-Ireland Under-21 Hurling Championship (2): 2005, 2007

Connacht

- Railway Cup (1): 2004

=== Individual ===
- Philips Sports Manager of the Year: 2017

Sporting positions
Preceded by Anthony Cunningham	Galway Senior Hurling Manager; 2015–2019	Succeeded by Shane O'Neill
Preceded by Mattie Kenny	Dublin Senior Hurling Manager; 2022–	Succeeded by Incumbent
Achievements
Preceded by Michael Ryan	All-Ireland SHC winning manager 2017	Succeeded by John Kiely
