= 2026 Christy Ring Cup =

Hurling competition

- Corn Chriostóir Uí Rinn

Tournament details
- Level: 3
- Year: 2026
- Trophy: Christy Ring Cup
- Dates: 12 April - 30/31 May 2026
- Teams: 6

Winners
- Champions: Derry (1st win)
- Manager: Johnny McGarvey
- Captain: Cormac O'Doherty
- Qualify for: Christy Ring Cup Final

Runners-up
- Runners-up: Kerry
- Manager: John Griffin
- Captain: James O'Connor

The 2026 Christy Ring Cup will be the twenty-second edition of the Christy Ring Cup since its establishment by the Gaelic Athletic Association in 2005 and is the third-tier of Hurling for senior county teams (the All-Ireland Senior Hurling Championship is the first-tier trophy). It will be contested by six GAA county teams ranked 18–23 in the 2026 All-Ireland Senior Hurling Championship. The competition runs from 12 April to 30/31 May 2026.

London, winner of the 2025 final, were promoted to the Joe McDonagh Cup, replaced by Kerry who were relegated to this competition. Roscommon were promoted from the Nicky Rackard Cup, replacing Tyrone.

The top 2 teams from the round robin stage will play off in the final to decide the winner.

The bottom team will be relegated to the Nicky Rackard Cup.

== Team changes ==
=== To Championship ===
Relegated from the Joe McDonagh Cup

- Kerry

Promoted from the Nicky Rackard Cup

- Roscommon

=== From Championship ===
Promoted to the Joe McDonagh Cup

- London

Relegated to the Nicky Rackard Cup

- Tyrone

== Format ==
=== Cup format ===
Initially each of the six teams will play the other five teams in single round-robin matches. The top two teams after the round robin games will compete in the Christy Ring Cup Final.

==== Promotion ====
The winner of the Christy Ring Cup will be automatically promoted to the following year's Joe McDonagh Cup and replaced by the bottom-placed team in the Joe McDonagh Cup.

==== Relegation ====
The bottom-placed team in the Christy Ring Cup will be automatically relegated to the following year's Nicky Rackard Cup and replaced by the Nicky Rackard Cup champions. However, if New York are the Nicky Rackard Cup champions, no team will be relegated from the Christy Ring Cup.

=== Teams by province ===
The participating teams, listed by province, with numbers in parentheses indicating final positions in the 2026 National Hurling League before the championship were:

Connacht (1)

- Roscommon (24)

Leinster (2)

- Meath (18)
- Wicklow (22)

Munster (1)

- Kerry (16)

Ulster (2)

- Derry (20)
- Donegal (23)

== Teams ==
=== General information ===
| County team | Last Cup title | Last Provincial title | Last All-Ireland title | Position in 2024 Championship | Appearance |
|---|---|---|---|---|---|
| Derry | — | 2001 | — | 2nd | 20th |
| Donegal | — | 1932 | — | 4th | 3rd |
| Kerry | 2015 | 1891 | 1891 | 6th (Joe McDonagh Cup) | 12th |
| Meath | 2023 | — | — | 5th | 16th |
| Roscommon | — | 1913 | — | Champions (Nicky Rackard Cup) | 10th |
| Wicklow | — | — | — | 3rd | 21st |

=== Personnel and kits ===
| County | Manager | Captain(s) | Sponsor |
|---|---|---|---|
| Derry | Johnny McGarvey | Cormac O'Doherty | Errigal Group |
| Donegal | Mickey McCann | Conor Gartland | Circet |
| Kerry | John Griffin | James O'Connor | Kerry Group |
| Meath | Johnny Greville | Brian Stagg | Bective Stud |
| Roscommon | Brian Hanley | Conor Mulry | Ballymore |
| Wicklow | Jonathan O'Neill | Pádraig Doran | Echelon |

== Group Stage ==
=== Table ===
| Pos | Team | Pld | W | D | L | SF | SA | Diff | Pts | Qualification |
|---|---|---|---|---|---|---|---|---|---|---|
| 1 | Kerry | 5 | 4 | 0 | 1 | 20-101 | 5-84 | +62 | 8 | Advanced to Final |
| 2 | Derry | 5 | 3 | 1 | 1 | 9-89 | 7-72 | +23 | 7 | Advanced to Final |
| 3 | Meath | 5 | 3 | 1 | 1 | 7-97 | 10-79 | +9 | 7 | |
| 4 | Wicklow | 5 | 2 | 0 | 3 | 7-66 | 13-91 | -43 | 4 | |
| 5 | Donegal | 5 | 1 | 1 | 3 | 5-88 | 11-79 | -9 | 3 | |
| 6 | Roscommon | 5 | 0 | 1 | 4 | 6-65 | 8-101 | -42 | 1 | Not relegated to Nicky Rackard Cup (Note: As New York won the Nicky Rackard Cup, they will not be promoted and no team will be relegated.) |

=== Round 1 ===
| 12 April 2026 Round 1 | Donegal | 1-17 (20) - (9) 1-06 | Wicklow | Letterkenny |
| 13:00 | | | | Stadium: O'Donnell Park |

| 12 April 2026 Round 1 | Meath | 0-12 (12) - (26) 3-17 | Kerry | Trim |
| 13:00 | | | | Stadium: St Loman's Park |

| 12 April 2026 Round 1 | Derry | 1-22 (25) - (13) 1-10 | Roscommon | Derry |
| 15:00 | | | | Stadium: Find Insurance Celtic Park |

=== Round 2 ===
| 18 April 2026 Round 2 | Roscommon | 2-12 (18) - (28) 0-28 | Meath | Roscommon |
| 15:00 | | | | Stadium: King & Moffatt Dr Hyde Park |

| 19 April 2026 Round 2 | Kerry | 5-18 (33) - (28) 2-22 | Donegal | Tralee |
| 13:00 | | | | Stadium: Austin Stack Park |

| 19 April 2026 Round 2 | Wicklow | 2-12 (18) - (17) 1-14 | Derry | Aughrim |
| 13:00 | | | | Stadium: Echelon Park |

=== Round 3 ===
| 25 April 2026 Round 3 | Roscommon | 1-18 (21) - (34) 4-22 | Kerry | Roscommon |
| 13:00 | | | | Stadium: King & Moffatt Dr Hyde Park |

| 25 April 2026 Round 3 | Derry | 2-23 (29) - (19) 1-16 | Donegal | Derry |
| 15:00 | | | | Stadium: Find Insurance Celtic Park |

| 26 April 2026 Round 3 | Wicklow | 1-19 (22) - (30) 2-24 | Meath | Aughrim |
| 14:00 | | | | Stadium: Echelon Park |

=== Round 4 ===
| 9 May 2026 Round 4 | Meath | 3-15 (24) - (24) 3-15 | Derry | Trim |
| 13:00 | | | | Stadium: St Loman's Park |

| 9 May 2026 Round 4 | Kerry | 8-25 (49) - (17) 0-17 | Wicklow | Tralee |
| 13:00 | | | | Stadium: Austin Stack Park |

| 9 May 2026 Round 4 | Donegal | 0-17 (17) - (17) 1-14 | Roscommon | Letterkenny |
| 19:00 | | | | Stadium: O'Donnell Park |

=== Round 5 ===
| 16 May 2026 Round 5 | Derry | 2-15 (21) - (19) 0-19 | Kerry | Derry |
| 13:00 | | | | Stadium: Find Insurance Celtic Park |

| 16 May 2026 Round 5 | Donegal | 1-16 (19) - (24) 2-18 | Meath | Letterkenny |
| 13:00 | | | | Stadium: O'Donnell Park |

| 16 May 2026 Round 5 | Wicklow | 3-12 (21) - (14) 1-11 | Roscommon | Aughrim |
| 13:00 | | | | Stadium: Echelon Park |

== Knockout Stage ==
=== Final ===
| 30 May 2026 Final | Kerry | 3-19 (28) – (33) 3-24 | Derry | Dublin |
| 15:00 | | (HT: 0-09 - 1-12) | | Venue: Croke Park |
| | | | | TV: TG4 |

== Stadia and Locations ==
Locations of the 2026 Christy Ring Cup counties.

| County | Location | Province | Stadium | Capacity |
|---|---|---|---|---|
| Neutral | Dublin | Leinster | Croke Park | 82,300 |
| Derry | Derry | Ulster | Celtic Park | 22,000 |
| Donegal | Letterkenny | Ulster | O'Donnell Park | 8,200 |
| Kerry | Tralee | Munster | Austin Stack Park | 12,000 |
| Meath | Trim | Leinster | St. Loman's Park | |
| Roscommon | Roscommon | Connacht | Dr Hyde Park | 25,000 |
| Wicklow | Aughrim | Leinster | Echelon Park Aughrim | 7,000 |

== Miscellaneous ==
- Derry qualified for their fourth successive Christy Ring Cup final

== Statistics ==
=== Top scorers ===
Overall

| Rank | Player | County | Tally | Total | Matches | Average |
|---|---|---|---|---|---|---|
| 1 | | | | | | |
| 2 | | | | | | |
| 3 | | | | | | |
| 4 | | | | | | |
| 5 | | | | | | |
| 6 | | | | | | |
| 7 | | | | | | |
| 8 | | | | | | |
| 9 | | | | | | |
| 10 | | | | | | |

In a single game

| Rank | Player | County | Tally | Total | Opposition |
|---|---|---|---|---|---|
| 1 | | | | | |
| 2 | | | | | |
| 3 | | | | | |
| 4 | | | | | |
| 5 | | | | | |
| 6 | | | | | |
| 7 | | | | | |
| 8 | | | | | |
| 9 | | | | | |
| 10 | | | | | |

=== Scoring events ===
- Widest winning margin: 32 points
  - Kerry 8–25 — 0–17 Wicklow (Round 4)
- Most goals in a match: 8
  - Kerry 8–25 — 0–17 Wicklow (Round 4)
- Most points in a match: 43
  - Wicklow 1–19 — 2–24 Meath (Round 3)
  - Kerry 3–19 — 3–24 Derry (Final)
- Most goals by one team in a match: 8
  - Kerry 8–25 — 0–17 Wicklow (Round 4)
- Most points by one team in a match: 28
  - Roscommon 2–12 — 0–28 Meath (Round 2)
- Highest aggregate score: 66 points
  - Kerry 8–25 — 0–17 Wicklow (Round 4)
- Lowest aggregate score: 29 points
  - Donegal 1–17 — 1–06 Wicklow (Round 1)
- Hat-trick Heros:
  - Pádraig Boyle (Kerry) 3–02 v Donegal (Round 2)
  - Pádraig Boyle (Kerry) 3–09 v Roscommon (Round 3)
  - Michael Slattery (Kerry) 3–02 v Wicklow (Round 4)
  - Kevin Goulding (Kerry) 3–00 v Wicklow (Round 4)

== See also ==
- 2026 All-Ireland Senior Hurling Championship
- 2026 Leinster Senior Hurling Championship
- 2026 Munster Senior Hurling Championship
- 2026 Joe McDonagh Cup (Tier 2)
- 2026 Nicky Rackard Cup (Tier 4)
- 2026 Lory Meagher Cup (Tier 5)
