= 2026 Munster Senior Hurling Championship final =

- Event: 2026 Munster Senior Hurling Championship
Cork	Limerick
2-17	1-21
- Date: 7 June 2026
- Venue: Páirc Uí Chaoimh, Cork
- Man of the Match: Nickie Quaid
- Referee: James Owens
- Attendance: 43,365
- Weather: Rain

The 2026 Munster Senior Hurling Championship final was a hurling match that was played on 7 June at Páirc Uí Chaoimh in Cork. It was contested by defending champions Cork and Limerick.

Limerick captained by Cian Lynch won the game by one point on a 1-21 to 2-17 scoreline, it was a seventh Munster title for Limerick in eight years.

== Pre-match ==
The game was televised live on RTÉ 2 as part of The Sunday Game, presented by Joanne Cantwell with studio with analysis by Dónal Óg Cusack, Liam Sheedy, and Séamus Flanagan. Commentary on the game was provided by Marty Morrissey, alongside Brendan Cummins.

=== Details ===
7 June 2026
14:00
Munster Final

Cork	2-17–1-21	Limerick
Alan Connolly 0-7 (7f); Brian Hayes 1-1; Tim O’Mahony 0-4 (3 65s, 1f); Mark Coleman 1-0 (pen); Diarmuid Healy, William Buckley 0-2 each; Robert Downey 0-1.	Report	Aidan O’Connor 0-8 (5f, 2 65s); Gearóid Hegarty 1-1; Diarmaid Byrnes (2f, 1 65); Peter Casey 0-3 each; Tom Morrissey 0-2; Barry Nash, Cian Lynch, Cathal O’Neill, Shane O’Brien 0-1 each.

SuperValu Páirc Uí Chaoimh, Cork
Attendance: 43,365
Referee: James Owens (Wexford).
