= 2026 All-Ireland Senior Hurling Championship =

Inter-county hurling competition

Championship details
- Dates: 18 April — 19 July 2026
- Teams: 11 (Liam McCarthy); 36 (overall)

All-Ireland champions
- Winning team: Limerick (13th win)
- Captain: Cian Lynch
- Manager: John Kiely

All-Ireland Finalists
- Losing team: Galway
- Captain: Darren Morrissey
- Manager: Micheál Donoghue

Provincial champions
- Munster: Limerick
- Leinster: Galway
- Ulster: Not Played
- Connacht: Not Played

Championship statistics
- Top Scorer: Donal Burke (3-67)
- All-Star Team: See here

The 2026 All-Ireland Senior Hurling Championship (SHC) is the 139th staging of the All-Ireland Senior Hurling Championship, the Gaelic Athletic Association's premier inter-county hurling tournament, since its establishment in 1887.

Champions Tipperary entered the competition seeking back-to-back All-Ireland titles for the first time since 1965 but after finishing last in the Munster championship, they failed to qualify for the All-Ireland knockouts.

Limerick, winners in 2018 and in 2020–23, were considered one of the major contenders after winning the 2026 National Hurling League — along with Cork who were runners-up in both the previous edition of this competition and the 2026 League, but had not won an All-Ireland SHC title since 2005.

Kildare played in the Leinster SHC for the first time since 2004 after winning the 2025 Joe McDonagh Cup.

The tournament ended in July 2026 with Limerick defeating Galway in the final in Croke Park.

== Format ==
=== Leinster Championship ===
==== Participating counties (6) ====
Dublin, Galway, Kildare, Kilkenny, Offaly, Wexford

==== Group stage (15 matches) ====
Each team play each other once. The 1st and 2nd placed teams advance to the Leinster SHC final and the 3rd placed team advances to the All-Ireland SHC quarter-finals. All other teams are eliminated from the championship and the bottom placed team is relegated to the following year's Joe McDonagh Cup.

==== Final (1 match) ====
The top 2 teams in the group stage contest this game. The Leinster champions advance to the All-Ireland SHC semi-finals and the Leinster runners-up advanced to the All-Ireland SHC quarter-finals.

=== Munster Championship ===
==== Participating counties (5) ====
Clare, Cork, Limerick, Tipperary, Waterford

==== Group stage (10 matches) ====
Each team plays each other once. The 1st and 2nd placed teams will advance to the Munster SHC final and the 3rd placed team advance to the All-Ireland SHC quarter-finals. The lowest placed team in this year's Munster championship will not be relegated to the 2027 Joe McDonagh Cup as a result of the relegation of Kerry to the 2026 Christy Ring Cup.

==== Final (1 match) ====
The top 2 teams in the group stage contest this game. The Munster champions advance to the All-Ireland SHC semi-finals while the Munster runners-up advance to the All-Ireland SHC quarter-finals.

=== All-Ireland Championship ===
Unlike previous years the two Joe McDonagh Cup finalists don't advance to preliminary quarter-finals, with these fixtures being scrapped by the 2026 GAA Congress.

==== Quarter-finals (2 matches) ====
The Munster runners-up play the third-placed team in Leinster and the Leinster runners-up play the third-placed team in Munster.

==== Semi-finals (2 matches) ====
The winners of the quarter-finals join the Leinster and Munster champions to make up the semi-final pairings. Teams who may have already met in the provincial championships are kept apart in separate semi-finals where possible.

==== Final (1 match) ====
The winners of the two semi-finals contest this game.

== Team changes ==
=== From Championship ===
Relegated to Joe McDonagh Cup

- Antrim

Removal of Preliminary Quarter-Finals

- Carlow
- Down
- Laois
- Westmeath

Relegated to Christy Ring Cup

- Kerry

== Teams ==
=== General information ===
Eleven counties compete in the All-Ireland Senior Hurling Championship: six teams in the Leinster Senior Hurling Championship and five teams in the Munster Senior Hurling Championship.

| County | Last provincial title | Last championship title | Position in 2025 Championship | Current championship |
|---|---|---|---|---|
| Clare | 1998 | 2024 | 4th in Munster SHC | Munster SHC |
| Cork | 2025 | 2005 | Finalists | Munster SHC |
| Dublin | 2013 | 1938 | Semi-finals | Leinster SHC |
| Galway | 2018 | 2017 | Quarter-finals | Leinster SHC |
| Kildare | — | — | Joe McDonagh Cup winners | Leinster SHC |
| Kilkenny | 2025 | 2015 | Semi-finals | Leinster SHC |
| Limerick | 2024 | 2023 | Quarter-finals | Munster SHC |
| Offaly | 1995 | 1998 | 5th in Leinster SHC | Leinster SHC |
| Tipperary | 2016 | 2025 | All-Ireland champions | Munster SHC |
| Waterford | 2010 | 1959 | 5th in Munster SHC | Munster SHC |
| Wexford | 2019 | 1996 | 4th in Leinster SHC | Leinster SHC |

=== Personnel and Kits ===
| County | Manager | Captain | Sponsor |
|---|---|---|---|
| Clare | Brian Lohan | Conor Cleary | Pat O'Donnell |
| Cork | Ben O'Connor | Darragh Fitzgibbon | Sports Direct |
| Dublin | Niall Ó Ceallacháin | Chris Crummey | Staycity |
| Galway | Micheál Donoghue | Darren Morrissey | Supermac's |
| Kildare | Brian Dowling | Rian Boran | Brady Family Ham |
| Kilkenny | Derek Lyng | TJ Reid | Avonmore |
| Limerick | John Kiely | Cian Lynch | JP McManus |
| Offaly | Johnny Kelly | Charlie Mitchell | Glenisk |
| Tipperary | Liam Cahill | Ronan Maher | Clover |
| Waterford | Peter Queally | Conor Prunty | Suir Engineering |
| Wexford | Keith Rossiter | Jack O'Connor | Zurich Insurance Group |

=== Teams by Province ===
The participating teams, listed by province, with numbers in parentheses indicating final positions in the 2026 National Hurling League (after promotion and relegation are applied and after finals are played) before the championship were:

Connacht (1)

- Galway (4)

Leinster (5)

- Dublin (7)
- Kildare (11)
- Kilkenny (5)
- Offaly (9)
- Wexford (10)

Munster (5)

- Clare (6)
- Cork (2)
- Limerick (1)
- Tipperary (3)
- Waterford (8)

Ulster (0)

- None Participated

== Summary ==
=== Championships ===
| Competition | Year | Champions | Title | Runners-up | Level on pyramid |
| All-Ireland Senior Hurling Championship | 2026 | | | | 1 |
| Leinster Senior Hurling Championship | 2026 | Galway | 4th | Dublin | 1 |
| Munster Senior Hurling Championship | 2026 | Limerick | 26th | Cork | 1 |
| Joe McDonagh Cup | 2026 | Laois | 2nd | Carlow | 2 |
| Christy Ring Cup | 2026 | Derry | 1st | Kerry | 3 |
| Nicky Rackard Cup | 2026 | New York | 1st | Tyrone | 4 |
| Lory Meagher Cup | 2026 | Longford | 3rd | Leitrim | 5 |

Key: (C) Champions; (P) Promoted; (R) Relegated

== Provincial Championships ==
=== Leinster Senior Hurling Championship ===
==== Group Stage ====
| Pos | Team | Pld | W | D | L | SF | SA | Diff | Pts | Qualification |
|---|---|---|---|---|---|---|---|---|---|---|
| 1 | Dublin | 5 | 4 | 1 | 0 | 11-114 | 5-106 | +26 | 9 | Advanced to Leinster Final |
| 2 | Galway (C) | 5 | 4 | 0 | 1 | 11-125 | 9-92 | +39 | 8 | Advanced to Leinster Final |
| 3 | Offaly | 5 | 2 | 2 | 1 | 8-114 | 7-105 | +12 | 6 | Advance to All-Ireland Quarter-Finals |
| 4 | Kilkenny | 5 | 2 | 1 | 2 | 11-105 | 5-105 | +18 | 5 | |
| 5 | Wexford | 5 | 1 | 0 | 4 | 7-95 | 12-108 | –28 | 2 | |
| 6 | Kildare (R) | 5 | 0 | 0 | 5 | 3-84 | 13-122 | –68 | 0 | Relegation to Joe McDonagh Cup |

==== Round 1 ====
| 18 April 2026 Round 1 | Galway | 3-25 (34) - (19) 1-16 | Kilkenny | Galway |
| 16:30 | | | | Stadium: Pearse Stadium; Attendance: 10,489 |

| 18 April 2026 Round 1 | Kildare | 1-14 (17) - (25) 1-22 | Wexford | Newbridge |
| 18:30 | | | | Stadium: Cedral St Conleth's Park; Attendance: 3,848 |

| 18 April 2026 Round 1 | Offaly | 4-22 (34) - (34) 2-28 | Dublin | Tullamore |
| 18:30 | | | | Stadium: Glenisk O'Connor Park; Attendance: 4,651 |

==== Round 2 ====
| 25 April 2026 Round 2 | Kilkenny | 5-21 (36) - (19) 1-16 | Wexford | Kilkenny |
| 18:30 | | Report | | Stadium: UPMC Nowlan Park; Attendance: 13,576 |

| 26 April 2026 Round 2 | Dublin | 3-24 (33) - (22) 1-19 | Kildare | Dublin |
| 16:30 | | Report | | Stadium: Parnell Park |

| 26 April 2026 Round 2 | Galway | 2-26 (32) - (21) 1-18 | Offaly | Galway |
| 15:30 | | Report | | Stadium: Pearse Stadium; Attendance: 6,557 |

==== Round 3 ====
| 9 May 2026 Round 3 | Kildare | 1-22 (25) - (34) 4-22 | Galway | Newbridge |
| 15:30 | | | | Stadium: Cedral St Conleth's Park |

| 9 May 2026 Round 3 | Wexford | 0-22 (22) - (27) 2-21 | Dublin | Wexford |
| 16:00 | | | | Stadium: Chadwicks Wexford Park; Attendance: 7,816 |

| 10 May 2026 Round 3 | Offaly | 0-24 (24) - (24) 1-21 | Kilkenny | Tullamore |
| 15:00 | | | | Stadium: Glenisk O'Connor Park; Attendance: 6,066 |

==== Round 4 ====
| 16 May 2026 Round 4 | Galway | 0-21 (21) – (25) 3-16 | Dublin | Galway |
| 16:30 | Aaron Niland 0-5 (4f); Cathal Mannion (3f, 165) 0-4; Tom Monaghan 0-3; Padraic Mannion, Conor Whelan and Darragh Neary 0-2 each; Cian Daniels, Jason Rabbitte and Colm Molloy 0-1 each. | Report | Dónal Burke 1-9 (1-1 65s, 7f); Ronan Hayes 1-2, Brian Hayes 1-0, Conal Ó Riain 0-2; Cian O'Sullivan, Conor Donohue and Conor Burke 0-1 each. | Stadium: Pearse Stadium; Referee: Colm Lyons (Cork) |

| 16 May 2026 Round 4 | Offaly | 2-21 (27) – (21) 2-15 | Wexford | Tullamore |
| 18:00 | | Report | | Stadium: Glenisk O'Connor Park; Attendance: 8,103 |

| 16 May 2026 Round 4 | Kilkenny | 4-25 (37) – (14) 0-14 | Kildare | Kilkenny |
| 18:00 | TJ Reid 2-6 (0-3f), H Shine 1-2, E Cody 1-2, M Keoghan 0-4, T Phelan 0-3, L Moore 0-2; C Kenny, P Deegan, D Blanchfield, A Mullen, T Clifford, K Doyle 0-1 each | Report | Darragh Melville 0-3, Jack Sheridan 0-2fs, Gerry Keegan 0-2, Cathal Dowling 0-2; Dan O'Meara, Conan Boran, Jack Travers, James Burke, Muiris Curtin 0-1 each | Stadium: UPMC Nowlan Park; Referee: Eamonn Furlong (Wexford) |

==== Round 5 ====
| 24 May 2026 Round 5 | Dublin | 1-26 (29) - (22) 0-22 | Kilkenny | Dublin |
| 14:00 | | | | Stadium: Parnell Park; Attendance: ~9,000 |

| 24 May 2026 Round 5 | Kildare | 0-15 (15) - (32) 1-29 | Offaly | Newbridge |
| 14:00 | | | | Stadium: Cedral St Conleth's Park; Attendance: 5,602 |

| 24 May 2026 Round 5 | Wexford | 3-20 (29) - (37) 2-31 | Galway | Wexford |
| 14:00 | | | | Stadium: Chadwicks Wexford Park |

==== Leinster Final ====
6 June 2026
18:00
Leinster Final

| Dublin | 4-15 (27) - (41) 4-29 | Galway |
|---|---|---|
| | Report |

Croke Park, Dublin
Attendance: 46,463
Referee: Michael Kennedy (Tipperary)

=== Munster Senior Hurling Championship ===
==== Group Stage ====
| Pos | Team | Pld | W | D | L | SF | SA | Diff | Pts | Qualification |
|---|---|---|---|---|---|---|---|---|---|---|
| 1 | Cork | 4 | 4 | 0 | 0 | 4-107 | 3-84 | +26 | 8 | Advance to Munster Final |
| 2 | Limerick (C) | 4 | 3 | 0 | 1 | 10-109 | 5-85 | +39 | 6 | Advance to Munster Final |
| 3 | Clare | 4 | 2 | 0 | 2 | 5-90 | 7-98 | -14 | 4 | Advance to All-Ireland Quarter-Finals |
| 4 | Waterford | 4 | 0 | 1 | 3 | 9-90 | 6-118 | –19 | 1 | |
| 5 | Tipperary | 4 | 0 | 1 | 3 | 2-94 | 9-105 | –32 | 1 | |

==== Round 1 ====
| 19 April 2026 Round 1 | Clare | 2-33 (39) - (33) 4-21 | Waterford | Ennis |
| 14:00 | | | | Stadium: Zimmer Biomet Páirc Chíosóg; Attendance: 18,338 |

| 19 April 2026 Round 1 | Tipperary | 1-22 (25) - (29) 0-29 | Cork | Thurles |
| 16:00 | | | | Stadium: FBD Semple Stadium; Attendance: 44,348 |

==== Round 2 ====
| 26 April 2026 Round 2 | Cork | 2-22 (28) - (26) 1-23 | Limerick | Cork |
| 14:00 | | | | Stadium: SuperValu Páirc Uí Chaoimh; Attendance: 43,369 |

| 26 April 2026 Round 2 | Waterford | 3-24 (33) - (33) 1-30 | Tipperary | Waterford |
| 16:00 | | | | Stadium: Azzurri Walsh Park; Attendance: 11,982 |

==== Round 3 ====
| 3 May 2026 Round 3 | Clare | 1-18 (21) - (36) 2-30 | Limerick | Ennis |
| 18:00 | | | | Stadium: Zimmer Biomet Páirc Chíosóg; Attendance: 20,187 |

| 9 May 2026 Round 3 | Waterford | 0-25 (25) - (29) 1-26 | Cork | Waterford |
| 16:00 | | | | Stadium: Azzurri Walsh Park; Attendance: 12,017 |

==== Round 4 ====
| 16 May 2026 Round 4 | Tipperary | 0-17 (17) – (28) 1-25 | Clare | Thurles |
| 19:00 | | Report | | Stadium: FBD Semple Stadium; Attendance: 32,327 |

| 17 May 2026 Round 4 | Limerick | 2-29 (35) – (26) 2-20 | Waterford | Limerick |
| 15:00 | | | | Stadium: TUS Gaelic Grounds; Attendance: 22,425 |

==== Round 5 ====
| 24 May 2026 Round 5 | Cork | 1-30 (33) - (17) 1-14 | Clare | Cork |
| 16:00 | | | | Stadium: SuperValu Páirc Uí Chaoimh; Attendance: 42,269 |

| 24 May 2026 Round 5 | Limerick | 5-27 (42) - (25) 0-25 | Tipperary | Limerick |
| 16:00 | | | | Stadium: TUS Gaelic Grounds; Attendance: 29,019; Referee: Colm Lyons |

==== Munster Final ====
7 June 2026
14:00
Munster Final

| Cork | 2-17 (23) – (24) 1-21 | Limerick |
|---|---|---|
| | Report |

SuperValu Páirc Uí Chaoimh, Cork
Attendance: 43,365

== Cup Competitions ==
=== Joe McDonagh Cup (Tier 2) ===
==== Group Stage ====
| Pos | Team | Pld | W | D | L | SF | SA | Diff | Pts | Qualification |
|---|---|---|---|---|---|---|---|---|---|---|
| 1 | Carlow | 5 | 4 | 0 | 1 | 17-96 | 7-94 | +32 | 8 | Advanced to Final |
| 2 | Laois (C,P) | 5 | 4 | 0 | 1 | 13-125 | 6-104 | +42 | 8 | Advanced to Final |
| 3 | Down | 5 | 3 | 0 | 2 | 6-117 | 10-103 | +2 | 6 | |
| 4 | Antrim | 5 | 3 | 0 | 2 | 6-122 | 10-89 | +21 | 6 | |
| 5 | Westmeath | 5 | 1 | 0 | 4 | 7-102 | 12-120 | -33 | 2 | |
| 6 | London (R) | 5 | 0 | 0 | 5 | 6-71 | 10-123 | -64 | 0 | Relegated to Christy Ring Cup |

==== Final ====
| 6 June 2026 Final | Carlow | 1-18 (21) – (30) 1-27 | Laois | Dublin |
| 15:45 | | (HT: 1-07 - 0-13) | | Venue: Croke Park |
| | | | | TV: RTÉ 2 |

=== Christy Ring Cup (Tier 3) ===
==== Group Stage ====
| Pos | Team | Pld | W | D | L | SF | SA | Diff | Pts | Qualification |
|---|---|---|---|---|---|---|---|---|---|---|
| 1 | Kerry | 5 | 4 | 0 | 1 | 20-101 | 5-84 | +62 | 8 | Advance to Final |
| 2 | Derry (C,P) | 5 | 3 | 1 | 1 | 9-89 | 7-72 | +23 | 7 | Advance to Final |
| 3 | Meath | 5 | 3 | 1 | 1 | 7-97 | 10-79 | +9 | 7 | |
| 4 | Wicklow | 5 | 2 | 0 | 3 | 7-66 | 13-91 | –43 | 4 | |
| 5 | Donegal | 5 | 1 | 1 | 3 | 5-88 | 11-79 | –9 | 3 | |
| 6 | Roscommon | 5 | 0 | 1 | 4 | 6-65 | 8-101 | –42 | 1 | Not relegated because New York won the Nicky Rackard Cup |

==== Final ====
| 30 May 2026 Final | Kerry | 3-19 (28) – (33) 3-24 | Derry | Dublin |
| 15:00 | | (HT: 0-09 - 1-12) | | Venue: Croke Park |
| | | | | TV: TG4 |

=== Nicky Rackard Cup (Tier 4) ===
==== Group Stage ====
| Pos | Team | Pld | W | D | L | SF | SA | Diff | Pts | Qualification |
|---|---|---|---|---|---|---|---|---|---|---|
| 1 | Tyrone | 5 | 5 | 0 | 0 | 21-84 | 6-89 | +40 | 10 | Advance to Final |
| 2 | Mayo | 5 | 4 | 0 | 1 | 10-128 | 9-76 | +55 | 8 | Advance to Semi-Final |
| 3 | Sligo | 5 | 3 | 0 | 2 | 8-124 | 10-67 | +51 | 6 | |
| 4 | Louth | 5 | 2 | 0 | 3 | 6-78 | 8-106 | -34 | 4 | |
| 5 | Fermanagh | 5 | 1 | 0 | 4 | 7-71 | 10-122 | -60 | 2 | |
| 6 | Armagh (R) | 5 | 0 | 0 | 5 | 9-82 | 18-107 | -52 | 0 | Relegated to Lory Meagher Cup |

==== Semi-Final ====
| 24 May 2025 Semi-Final | New York | 4-18 (30) – (21) 1-18 | Mayo | Longford |
| 14:00 | | | | Venue: Glennon Brothers Pearse Park |
| | | | | Referee: Ciarán O'Donovan |

==== Final ====
| 30 May 2026 Final | Tyrone | 2-17 (23) – (28) 2-22 | New York | Dublin |
| 13:00 | | (HT: 1-10 - 1-14) | | Venue: Croke Park |
| | | | | TV: Spórt TG4 |

=== Lory Meagher Cup (Tier 5) ===
==== Group Stage ====
| Pos | Team | Pld | W | D | L | SF | SA | Diff | Pts | Qualification |
|---|---|---|---|---|---|---|---|---|---|---|
| 1 | Leitrim | 5 | 5 | 0 | 0 | 7-99 | 8-68 | +28 | 10 | Advance to Final |
| 2 | Longford (C,P) | 5 | 4 | 0 | 1 | 17-95 | 7-66 | +59 | 8 | Advance to Final |
| 3 | Monaghan | 5 | 2 | 0 | 3 | 6-89 | 10-75 | +2 | 4 | |
| 4 | Warwickshire | 5 | 2 | 0 | 3 | 13-77 | 12-84 | -4 | 4 | |
| 5 | Cavan | 5 | 2 | 0 | 3 | 9-76 | 9-93 | -17 | 4 | |
| 6 | Lancashire | 5 | 0 | 0 | 5 | 10-61 | 16-111 | -68 | 0 | |

==== Final ====
| 31 May 2026 Final | Leitrim | 1-13 (16) – (21) 1-18 | Longford | Dublin |
| 12:30 | | (HT: 0-10 - 0-08) | | Venue: Croke Park |
| | | | | TV: Spórt TG4 |

== All-Ireland Senior Hurling Championship ==
=== Bracket ===
Quarter-Finals; 20/21 June
Cork | 6-25
Offaly | 2-11
Dublin | 0-16
Clare | 0-29

Semi-Finals; 4/5 July
Galway | 2-26
Cork | 1-18
Limerick | 1-21
Clare | 1-19

All-Ireland Final; 19 July
Galway | 1-18
Limerick | 1-29

=== Quarter-Finals ===
| 20 June 2026 Quarter-Final | Dublin | 0-16 (16) – (29) 0-29 | Clare | Thurles |
| 19:00 | | (HT: 0-11 – 0-14) | | Venue: Semple Stadium |
| | Pts: Dónal Burke 12 (9fs), Seán Currie 1, Ronan Hayes 1, Conal Ó Riain 1, Conor Groarke 1 | Report | Pts: Tony Kelly 7 (3fs), Seán Rynne 5, Mark Rodgers 5(fs), Peter Duggan 3 (1s/l), Cathal Malone 2, Shane Meehan 2, Shane O’Donnell 2, Niall O’Farrell 1, Diarmuid Stritch 1, David Fitzgerald 1 | Referee: James Owens (Wexford); Attendance: 13,279; TV: RTÉ One |

| 21 June 2026 Quarter-Final | Cork | 6-25 (43) – (17) 2-11 | Offaly | Thurles |
| 15:30 | | (HT: 5-13 – 0-06) | | Venue: Semple Stadium |
| | Gls: B Hayes 3, A Walsh 2, S Barrett 1 Pts: A Connolly 7 (4fs, 2 '65'), S Barrett 3, D Fitzgibbon 2 (1f), B Roche 2, D Healy 2, S Harnedy 2, E Downey 1, R Downey 1, M Coleman 1, S O’Donoghue 1, R O’Flynn 1, W Buckley 1, A Walsh 1 | Report | Gls: A Screeney 1, O Kelly 1 Pts: B Duignan 3, E Cahill 2 (1f, 1 '65'), A Screeney 2 (1f), T Guinan 1, D Bourke 1, L Hoare 1 | Referee: S Stack (Dublin). Attendance: 40,185; TV: RTÉ One |

=== Semi-Finals ===
| 4 July 2026 Semi-Final | Galway | 2-26 (32) – (21) 1-18 | Cork | Dublin |
| 15:30 | | (HT: 1-12 – 1-13) | | Venue: Croke Park |
| | Gls: C Cooney 1, D Neary 1 Pts: T Monaghan 4, A Niland 3(fs), J Rabbitte 3, R Glennon 3, C Mannion 3 (1f), C Whelan 3, G Lee 2, T Killeen 1, D Morrissey 1, P Mannion 1, J Fleming 1, C Cooney 1 | Report | Gls: A Walsh 1 Pts: B Hayes 5, A Connolly 4 (3fs), S Barrett 3 (1f), D Fitzgibbon 2, W Buckley 1, B Walsh 1f | Referee: J Murphy (Limerick); Attendance: 82,300; TV: RTÉ 2 |

| 5 July 2026 Semi-Final | Limerick | 1-21 (24) – (22) 1-19 | Clare | Dublin |
| 16:00 | | (HT: 0-11 – 0-16) | | Venue: Croke Park |
| | Gls: A O’Connor 1 Pts: A O’Connor 9 (8fs), D Byrnes 3 (2fs), C O’Neill 2, P Casey 2, S O’Brien 1, A Gillane 1, K Hayes 1, B Nash 1, A English 1 | Report | Gls: T Kelly 1(pen); Pts: M Rodgers 7 (6fs), T Kelly 5, P Duggan 3, R Taylor 2, C Malone 1, S O’Donnell 1 | Referee: T. Walsh (Waterford); Attendance: 56,891; TV: RTÉ 2 |

=== Final ===
RTÉ2
BBC Two
GAA+

19 July 2026
15:30
Final

Report

| Galway | 1–18 (21) – (32) 1–29 | Limerick |
|---|---|---|
(HT: 0-8 – 0-13)
| Gls: Conor Cooney 1(pen); Pts: Aaron Niland 10 (8fs, 1 '65'), Conor Cooney 2 (1f), Thomas Monaghan 2, Cathal Mannion 1, Darragh Neary 1, Jason Rabbitte 1, Colm Molloy 1 | | Gls: Cathal O’Neill 1 Pts: Aidan O’Connor 5 (3fs), Cathal O’Neill 4, Aaron Gillane 4, Peter Casey 4, Diarmaid Byrnes 4 (2fs, 1 '65'), Kyle Hayes 2, Adam English 2, Cian Lynch 2, Barry Nash 1, David Reidy 1 |

Croke Park, Dublin
Referee: Colm Lyons (Cork)
Attendance: 82,300
Standby: James Owens (Wexford)
Linesman: Chros Mooney (Dublin)
Sideline: Niall Malone (Clare)
Umpires: Ciarán Hanley (Brian Dillons), Jim McEvoy (Blarney), Philip Mackey & Finian Mullane (Nemo Rangers)

== Stadia and locations ==
Locations of the 2026 All-Ireland SHC teams.
Red: Munster SHC; Green: Leinster SHC.

| County | Location | Province | Stadium | Capacity |
|---|---|---|---|---|
| Clare | Ennis | Munster | Cusack Park | 19,000 |
| Cork | Cork | Munster | Páirc Uí Chaoimh | 45,000 |
| Dublin | Dublin | Leinster | Croke Park (neutral) | 82,300 |
| Dublin | Donnycarney | Leinster | Parnell Park (official home venue) | 8,500 |
| Galway | Galway | Connacht | Pearse Stadium | 26,197 |
| Kildare | Newbridge | Leinster | St Conleth's Park | 15,000 |
| Kilkenny | Kilkenny | Leinster | Nowlan Park | 27,000 |
| Limerick | Limerick | Munster | Gaelic Grounds | 44,023 |
| Offaly | Tullamore | Leinster | O'Connor Park | 18,000 |
| Tipperary | Thurles | Munster | Semple Stadium | 45,690 |
| Waterford | Waterford | Munster | Walsh Park | 11,046 |
| Wexford | Wexford | Leinster | Chadwicks Wexford Park | 18,000 |

== Statistics ==
=== Top scorers ===
Overall

| Rank | Player | County | Tally | Total | Matches | Average |
|---|---|---|---|---|---|---|
| 1 | Donal Burke | Dublin | 3–67 | 76 | 7 | 10.80 |
| 2 | Aidan O'Connor | Limerick | 4-48 | 60 | 6 | 10.00 |
| 3 | Alan Connolly | Cork | 1-53 | 56 | 7 | 8.00 |
| 4 | Lee Chin | Wexford | 2–44 | 50 | 5 | 10.00 |
| 5 | Eoghan Cahill | Offaly | 1–42 | 45 | 6 | 7.50 |
| 6 | T. J. Reid | Kilkenny | 4–31 | 43 | 5 | 8.60 |
| 7 | Aaron Niland | Galway | 1-33 | 36 | 5 | 7.20 |
| 8 | Jack Sheridan | Kildare | 2-30 | 36 | 5 | 7.20 |
| 9 | Stephen Bennett | Waterford | 4-24 | 36 | 3 | 12.00 |
| 10 | Brian Hayes | Cork | 5–20 | 35 | 7 | 5.00 |
| 11 | Mark Rodgers | Clare | 0-33 | 33 | 5 | 6.60 |
| 12 | Adam Screeney | Offaly | 3–21 | 30 | 5 | 6.00 |
| 13 | Rory Burke | Galway | 4-06 | 18 | 3 | 6.00 |

==== From Play ====
| Rank | Player | County | Tally | Total | Matches | Average |
|---|---|---|---|---|---|---|
| 1 | | | | | | |
| 2 | | | | | | |
| 3 | | | | | | |
| 4 | | | | | | |
| 5 | | | | | | |
| 6 | | | | | | |
| 7 | | | | | | |
| 8 | | | | | | |
| 9 | | | | | | |
| 10 | | | | | | |

In a single game

| Rank | Player | County | Tally | Total | Opposition |
|---|---|---|---|---|---|
| 1 | | | | | |
| 2 | | | | | |
| 3 | | | | | |
| 4 | | | | | |
| 5 | | | | | |
| 6 | | | | | |
| 7 | | | | | |
| 8 | | | | | |
| 9 | | | | | |
| 10 | | | | | |

=== Scoring events ===
- Widest winning margin: 26 points
  - Cork 6–25 — 2–11 Offaly (All-Ireland Quarter Final)
- Most goals in a match: 8
  - Galway 4–29 — 4–15 Dublin (Leinster Final)
- Most points in a match: 54
  - Clare 2–33 — 4–21 Waterford (Munster Round 1)
  - Waterford 3–24 — 1–30 Tipperary (Munster Round 2)
- Most goals by one team in a match: 6
  - Cork 6–25 — 2–11 Offaly (All-Ireland Quarter Final)
- Most points by one team in a match: 33
  - Clare 2–33 — 4–21 Waterford (Munster Round 1)
- Highest aggregate score: 72 points
  - Clare 2–33 — 4–21 Waterford (Munster Round 1)
- Lowest aggregate score: 42 points
  - Wexford 1–22 — 1–14 Kildare (Leinster Round 2)
- Hat-tricks:
  - Stephen Bennett (Waterford) 3-12 v Clare (Munster Round 1)
  - Brian Hayes (Cork) 3-0 v Offaly (All-Ireland quarter final)

== Notable events and records ==
- Kildare played in the Leinster Senior Hurling Championship for the first time since 2004, and played their first ever All-Ireland game against Kilkenny.
- Offaly reach the All-Ireland quarter-final stage for the first time since 2003.
- Kilkenny failed to win the All-Ireland for the eleventh year in a row, the longest wait for a title in their history ever since they won their first All-Ireland SHC in 1904. They were knocked out in the Leinster championship and did not appear in the All-Ireland qualifiers or series for the first time since 1996.
- Cork also extended their record title drought to 21 successive seasons, their last title being in 2005.
- Galway reach their first All-Ireland final since 2018.

== Awards ==
Sunday Game Team of the Year

The Sunday Game team of the year was picked 19 July on the night of the final.

The panel consisting of Brendan Cummins, Dónal Óg Cusack, Shane Dowling, Ursula Jacob, Anthony Daly, and Patrick Horgan also chose Gearóid Hegarty as the Sunday game player of the year.

- 1.Nickie Quaid (Limerick)
- 2. Sean Finn (Limerick)
- 3. Darren Morrissey (Galway)
- 4. Barry Nash (Limerick)
- 5. Diarmaid Byrnes (Limerick)
- 6. Will O'Donoghue (Limerick)
- 7. Kyle Hayes (Limerick)
- 8. Cian Lynch (Limerick)
- 9. Cathal Mannion (Galway)
- 10. Gearóid Hegarty (Limerick)
- 11. Aidan O'Connor (Limerick)
- 12. Cathal O'Neill (Limerick)
- 13. Jason Rabbitte (Galway)
- 14. Peter Duggan (Clare)
- 15. Brian Hayes (Cork)

== See also ==
- 2026 Leinster Senior Hurling Championship
- 2026 Munster Senior Hurling Championship
- 2026 Joe McDonagh Cup (Tier 2)
- 2026 Christy Ring Cup (Tier 3)
- 2026 Nicky Rackard Cup (Tier 4)
- 2026 Lory Meagher Cup (Tier 5)
