= 2026 Leinster Senior Hurling Championship =

Hurling competition

Leinster Senior Hurling Championship
Tournament details
- Province: Leinster
- Year: 2026
- Trophy: Bob O'Keeffe Cup
- Date: 18 April – 6 June 2026
- Teams: 6
- Defending champions: Kilkenny

Winners
- Champions: Galway (4th win)
- Manager: Micheál Donoghue
- Captain: Darren Morrissey
- Qualify for: Leinster SHC Final; All-Ireland SHC

Promotion/Relegation
- Relegated team(s): Kildare

Other
- Website: Leinster GAA

The 2026 Leinster Senior Hurling Championship was the 2026 installment of the annual Leinster Senior Hurling Championship organised by Leinster GAA.

Galway won the title for the fourth time overall and their first since 2018 after defeating Dublin in the final on 6 June.

== Format ==
=== Group stage (15 matches) ===
Each team play each other once. The 1st and 2nd placed teams advance to the Leinster SHC final and the 3rd placed team advances to the All-Ireland SHC quarter-finals. All other teams are eliminated from the championship and the bottom placed team is relegated to the following year's Joe McDonagh Cup.

=== Final (1 match) ===
The top 2 teams in the group stage contest this game. The Leinster champions advance to the All-Ireland SHC semi-finals and the Leinster runners-up advanced to the All-Ireland SHC quarter-finals.

== Team Changes ==
=== To Championship ===
Promoted from the Joe McDonagh Cup

- Kildare

=== From Championship ===
Relegated to the Joe McDonagh Cup

- Antrim

== Teams ==
=== General Information ===
Six counties will compete in the Leinster Senior Hurling Championship:

| County | Last Championship Title | Last All-Ireland Title | Position in 2025 Championship |
|---|---|---|---|
| Dublin | 2013 | 1938 | 3rd |
| Galway | 2018 | 2017 | Runners-up |
| Kildare | — | — | Champions (Joe McDonagh Cup) |
| Kilkenny | 2025 | 2015 | Champions |
| Offaly | 1995 | 1998 | 5th |
| Wexford | 2019 | 1996 | 4th |

=== Personnel and kits ===
| County | Manager | Captain(s) | Sponsor |
|---|---|---|---|
| Dublin | Niall Ó Ceallacháin | Chris Crummey | Staycity |
| Galway | Micheál Donoghue | Darren Morrissey | Supermac's |
| Kildare | Brian Dowling | Rian Boran | Brady Family Ham |
| Kilkenny | Derek Lyng | TJ Reid | Avonmore |
| Offaly | Johnny Kelly | Charlie Mitchell | Glenisk |
| Wexford | Keith Rossiter | Jack O'Connor | Zurich Insurance Group |

== Group Stage ==
=== Table ===
| Pos | Team | Pld | W | D | L | SF | SA | Diff | Pts | Qualification |
|---|---|---|---|---|---|---|---|---|---|---|
| 1 | Dublin | 5 | 4 | 1 | 0 | 11-114 | 5-106 | +26 | 9 | Advance to Leinster Final |
| 2 | Galway | 5 | 4 | 0 | 1 | 11-125 | 9-92 | +39 | 8 | Advance to Leinster Final |
| 3 | Offaly | 5 | 2 | 2 | 1 | 8-114 | 7-105 | +12 | 6 | Advance to All-Ireland Quarter-Finals |
| 4 | Kilkenny | 5 | 2 | 1 | 2 | 11-105 | 5-105 | +18 | 5 | |
| 5 | Wexford | 5 | 1 | 0 | 4 | 7-95 | 12-108 | –28 | 2 | |
| 6 | Kildare (R) | 5 | 0 | 0 | 5 | 3-84 | 13-122 | –68 | 0 | Relegation to Joe McDonagh Cup |

=== Fixtures ===
==== Round 1 ====
| 18 April 2026 Round 1 | Galway | 3-25 (34) - (19) 1-16 | Kilkenny | Galway |
| 16:30 | | | | Stadium: Pearse Stadium; Attendance: 10,489 |

| 18 April 2026 Round 1 | Kildare | 1-14 (17) - (25) 1-22 | Wexford | Newbridge |
| 18:30 | | | | Stadium: Cedral St Conleth's Park |

| 18 April 2026 Round 1 | Offaly | 4-22 (34) - (34) 2-28 | Dublin | Tullamore |
| 18:30 | | | | Stadium: Glenisk O'Connor Park; Attendance: ~6,000 |

==== Round 2 ====
| 25 April 2026 Round 2 | Kilkenny | 5-21 (36) - (19) 1-16 | Wexford | Kilkenny |
| 18:30 | | | | Stadium: UPMC Nowlan Park; Attendance: 13,576 |

| 26 April 2026 Round 2 | Dublin | 3-24 (33) - (22) 1-19 | Kildare | Dublin |
| 16:30 | | | | Stadium: Parnell Park |

| 26 April 2026 Round 2 | Galway | 2-26 (32) - (21) 1-18 | Offaly | Galway |
| 15:30 | | | | Stadium: Pearse Stadium; Attendance: 6,557 |

==== Round 3 ====
| 9 May 2026 Round 3 | Kildare | 1-22 (25) - (34) 4-22 | Galway | Newbridge |
| 15:30 | | | | Stadium: Cedral St Conleth's Park |

| 9 May 2026 Round 3 | Wexford | 0-22 (22) - (27) 2-21 | Dublin | Wexford |
| 16:00 | | | | Stadium: Chadwicks Wexford Park; Attendance: 7,816 |

| 10 May 2026 Round 3 | Offaly | 0-24 (24) - (24) 1-21 | Kilkenny | Tullamore |
| 15:00 | | | | Stadium: Glenisk O'Connor Park; Attendance: 6,066 |

==== Round 4 ====
| 16 May 2026 Round 4 | Galway | 0-21 (21) – (24) 3-15 | Dublin | Galway |
| 16:30 | | Report | | Stadium: Pearse Stadium; Referee: Colm Lyons (Cork) |

| 16 May 2026 Round 4 | Offaly | 2-21 (27) – (21) 2-15 | Wexford | Tullamore |
| 18:00 | | Report | | Stadium: Glenisk O'Connor Park |

| 16 May 2026 Round 4 | Kilkenny | 4-25 (37) – (14) 0-14 | Kildare | Kilkenny |
| 18:00 | TJ Reid 2-6 (0-3f), H Shine 1-2, E Cody 1-2, M Keoghan 0-4, T Phelan 0-3, L Moore 0-2; C Kenny, P Deegan, D Blanchfield, A Mullen, T Clifford, K Doyle 0-1 each | Report | Darragh Melville 0-3, Jack Sheridan 0-2fs, Gerry Keegan 0-2, Cathal Dowling 0-2; Dan O'Meara, Conan Boran, Jack Travers, James Burke, Muiris Curtin 0-1 each | Stadium: UPMC Nowlan Park; Referee: Eamonn Furlong (Wexford) |

==== Round 5 ====
| 24 May 2026 Round 5 | Dublin | 1-26 (29) - (22) 0-22 | Kilkenny | Dublin |
| 14:00 | | | | Stadium: Parnell Park |

| 24 May 2026 Round 5 | Kildare | 0-15 (15) - (32) 1-29 | Offaly | Newbridge |
| 14:00 | | | | Stadium: Cedral St Conleth's Park |

| 24 May 2026 Round 5 | Wexford | 3-20 (29) - (37) 2-31 | Galway | Wexford |
| 14:00 | | | | Stadium: Chadwicks Wexford Park |

== Leinster Final ==
6 June 2026
18:00
Leinster Final

| Dublin | 4-15 (27) - (41) 4-29 | Galway |
|---|---|---|
| | Report |

Croke Park, Dublin
Attendance: 46,463
Referee: Michael Kennedy (Tipperary)

== Stadia and Locations ==
Locations of the 2026 Leinster SHC teams.

| County | Location | Province | Stadium | Capacity |
|---|---|---|---|---|
| Neutral venue | Dublin | Leinster | Croke Park | 82,300 |
| Dublin | Donnycarney | Leinster | Parnell Park | 8,500 |
| Galway | Galway | Connacht | Pearse Stadium | 26,197 |
| Kildare | Newbridge | Leinster | St Conleth's Park | 15,000 |
| Kilkenny | Kilkenny | Leinster | Nowlan Park | 27,000 |
| Offaly | Tullamore | Leinster | Glenisk O'Connor Park | 20,000 |
| Wexford | Wexford | Leinster | Chadwicks Wexford Park | 18,000 |

== Statistics ==
=== Top Scorers ===
Overall

| Rank | Player | County | Tally | Total | Matches | Average |
|---|---|---|---|---|---|---|
| 1 | | | | | | |
| 2 | | | | | | |
| 3 | | | | | | |
| 4 | | | | | | |
| 5 | | | | | | |
| 6 | | | | | | |
| 7 | | | | | | |
| 8 | | | | | | |
| 9 | | | | | | |
| 10 | | | | | | |

In a single game

| Rank | Player | County | Tally | Total | Opposition |
|---|---|---|---|---|---|
| 1 | | | | | |
| 2 | | | | | |
| 3 | | | | | |
| 4 | | | | | |
| 5 | | | | | |
| 6 | | | | | |
| 7 | | | | | |
| 8 | | | | | |
| 9 | | | | | |
| 10 | | | | | |

=== Scoring Events ===
- Widest winning margin: 23 points
  - Kilkenny 4–25 — 0–14 Kildare (Round 4)
- Most goals in a match: 6
  - Offaly 4–22 — 2–28 Dublin (Round 1)
  - Kilkenny 5–21 — 1–16 Wexford (Round 2)
- Most points in a match: 51
  - Wexford 3–20 — 2–31 Galway (Round 5)
- Most goals by one team in a match: 5
  - Kilkenny 5–21 — 1–16 Wexford (Round 2)
- Most points by one team in a match: '37
  - Wexford 3–20 — 2–31 Galway (Round 5)
- Highest aggregate score: 68 points
  - Offaly 4–22 — 2–28 Dublin (Round 1)
- Lowest aggregate score: 42 points
  - Kildare 1–14 — 1–22 Wexford (Round 1)

== See also ==
- 2026 All-Ireland Senior Hurling Championship
- 2026 Munster Senior Hurling Championship
- 2026 Joe McDonagh Cup (Tier 2)
- 2026 Christy Ring Cup (Tier 3)
- 2026 Nicky Rackard Cup (Tier 4)
- 2026 Lory Meagher Cup (Tier 5)
