= All-Ireland Senior Hurling Championship =

Annual inter-county hurling competition

- Current season or competition: 2026 All-Ireland Senior Hurling Championship
- Irish: Craobh Shinsir Iomána na hÉireann
- Code: Hurling
- Founded: 1887; 139 years ago
- Region: Ireland (GAA)
- Trophy: Liam MacCarthy Cup
- No. of teams: 36
- Title holders: Limerick (13th title)
- Most titles: Kilkenny (36 titles)
- Sponsors: Bord Gáis Energy; Centra; Eir
- TV partner(s): RTÉ; BBC Northern Ireland
- Motto: Be there. All the way
- Official website: gaa.ie/hurling/all-ireland

The GAA Hurling All-Ireland Senior Championship, known simply as the All-Ireland Championship, is an annual inter-county hurling competition organised by the Gaelic Athletic Association (GAA). It is the highest-tier competition for inter-county hurling in Ireland and has been contested in every year except one since 1887.

The final, formerly held in September, then August and now moved to July, is the culmination of a series of games played during the summer and with the winning team receiving the Liam MacCarthy Cup. The All-Ireland Championship has been played on a straight knockout basis for the majority of its existence, whereby a team's first loss eliminated them from the championship. In more recent years, the qualification procedures for the championship have changed several times. Currently, qualification is limited to teams competing in 2 feeder competitions; three teams from the Leinster Senior Hurling Championship and three teams from the Munster Senior Hurling Championship. Annual promotion and relegation allows teams outside these competitions (teams from the Joe McDonagh Cup — tier 2, Christy Ring Cup - tier 3, the Nicky Rackard Cup - tier 4 and the Lory Meagher Cup - tier 5) to eventually reach the All-Ireland Senior Hurling Championship.

Seventeen teams currently participate in the All-Ireland Championship, with the most successful coming from the provinces of Leinster and Munster. 13 different teams have won the title, 10 of whom have been champions more than once. Kilkenny are the competition's most successful team, having been All-Ireland champions on 36 occasions. Kilkenny, Cork and Tipperary are considered "the big three" of hurling and hold 95 championships between them, while Limerick have had huge success in recent years, winning six titles in the last nine years including, most recently, defeating Galway by 1-29 to 1-18 in the 2026 final.

The All-Ireland Senior Hurling Championship final was listed in second place by CNN in its "10 sporting events you have to see live", after the Olympic Games.

== History ==
=== Creation ===
Following the foundation of the Gaelic Athletic Association in 1884, new rules for Gaelic football and hurling were drawn up and published in the United Irishman newspaper. In 1886, county committees began to be established, with several counties affiliating over the next few years. The GAA ran its inaugural All-Ireland Senior Hurling Championship in 1887. The decision to establish that first championship was influenced by several factors. Firstly, inter-club contests in 1885 and 1886 were wildly popular and began to draw huge crowds. Clubs started to travel across the country to play against each other and these matches generated intense interest as the newspapers began to speculate which teams might be considered the best in the country. Secondly, although the number of clubs was growing, many were slow to affiliate to the Association, leaving it short of money. Establishing a central championship held the prospect of enticing GAA clubs to process their affiliations, just as the establishment of the FA Cup had done much in the 1870s to promote the development of the Football Association in England. The championships were open to all affiliated clubs who would first compete in county-based competitions, to be run by local county committees. The winners of each county championship would then proceed to represent that county in the All-Ireland series.

=== Beginnings ===
The inaugural All-Ireland Championship used, for the only time in its history, an open draw format without the provincial series of games. All of the existing county boards were eligible to enter a team, however, only six chose to do so. Disputes in Cork and Limerick over which club should represent the county resulted in neither county fielding a team. Dublin later withdrew from the championship. In all five teams participated: Clare (Garraunboy Smith O'Briens), Galway (Meelick), Kilkenny (Tullaroan) Tipperary (Thurles) and Wexford (Castlebridge).

Galway and Wexford contested the very first championship match on Saturday 2 July 1887. Postponements, disqualifications, objections, withdrawals and walkovers were regular occurrences during the initial years of the championship. The inaugural All-Ireland final took place on 1 April 1888 in Birr, County Offaly, with Tipperary defeating Galway to take the title.

=== Development ===
The provincial championships were introduced in 1888 in Munster, Leinster, Connacht and Ulster on a knock-out basis. The winners of the provincial finals participated in the All-Ireland semi-finals. Over time the Leinster and Munster teams grew to become the superpowers of the game, as Gaelic football was the more dominant sport in Ulster and Connacht. After some time Galway became the only credible team in Connacht and was essentially given an automatic pass to the All-Ireland semi-final every year. This knock-out system persisted for over 100 years and was considered to be the fairest system as the All-Ireland champions would always be the only undefeated team of the year.

Unlike in other European countries, such as neighbouring England, where annual sports events were cancelled during the twentieth century due to the First and Second World Wars, the All-Ireland Championship has been running continuously since 1887, with the final running since 1889 (the 1888 competition was played but no final was held due to the Invasion tour). The competition continued even in spite of the effects on the country of the Civil War and the Second World War (the National Hurling League was not held during the latter). In 1941, the All-Ireland Championship was disrupted by an outbreak of foot-and-mouth disease.

The duration of certain championship matches increased from 60 to 80 minutes during the 1970s. They were settled at 70 minutes after five seasons of this in 1975. This applied only to the provincial finals, All-Ireland semi-finals and finals.

In the mid-1990s the Gaelic Athletic Association looked at developing a new system whereby a defeat in the championship for certain teams would not mean an immediate exit from the Championship. In the 1997 championship the first major change in format arrived when the 'back-door system' was introduced. This new structure allowed the defeated Munster and Leinster finalists another chance to regain a place in the All-Ireland semi-finals. Tipperary and Kilkenny were the first two teams to benefit from the new system when they defeated Down and Galway respectively in the quarter-finals. The All-Ireland final in the first year of this new experiment was a replay of the Munster final with Clare defeating Tipperary. The first team to win the All-Ireland through the 'back-door' was Offaly in 1998, winning a replay of the Leinster final by beating Kilkenny 2–16 to 1–13.

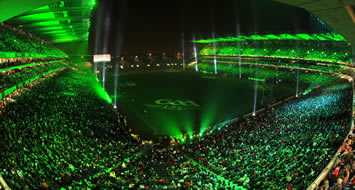
Fireworks and light displays in Croke Park in Dublin to mark the 125th anniversary of the Gaelic Athletic Association, January 2009

The new "back-door system" proved successful and was expanded over the following years. The 2005 Championship saw even bigger changes in the "back-door" or qualifier system. The Munster and Leinster champions and defeated finalists automatically qualified for the new quarter-final stages, while two groups of four other teams played in a league format to fill the vacant four places in the quarter-finals. Many criticised the structure for not being a real championship at all, for degrading the Munster and Leinster championships and for penalising the strongest teams.

2008 brought a change to the competition format, whereby the team that won the Leinster and Munster championships advanced to the All-Ireland semi-finals, and the losers of the provincial finals advanced to two quarter-finals. A series of knockout qualifiers for the remaining teams decided which other two teams would reach the quarter-finals. The updated qualifier structure provided more games and gave renewed hope to the "weaker" teams, as a defeat in the first round no longer meant the end of a county's All-Ireland ambitions.

== Format ==
=== Current format ===
==== Leinster Championship (six teams) ====
Group stage (15 matches): Each team plays each other once. The 1st and 2nd placed teams advance to the Leinster final and the 3rd placed team advances to the all-Ireland quarter-finals. All other teams are eliminated from the championship and the bottom placed team may face relegation to next years Joe McDonagh Cup.

Final (1 match): The top 2 teams in the group stage contest this game. The Leinster champions advance to the All-Ireland semi-finals and the Leinster runners-up advance to the All-Ireland quarter-finals.

==== Munster Championship (five teams) ====
Group stage (10 matches): Each team plays each other once. The 1st and 2nd placed teams advance to the Munster final and the 3rd placed team advances to the all-Ireland quarter-finals. All other teams are eliminated from the championship and the bottom placed team may face relegation to next years Joe McDonagh Cup.

Final (1 match): The top 2 teams in the group stage contest this game. The Munster champions advance to the All-Ireland semi-finals and the Munster runners-up advance to the All-Ireland quarter-finals.

==== All-Ireland Championship ====
Quarter-finals (2 matches): The Munster runners-up will play the third-placed team in Leinster and the Leinster runners-up will play the third-placed team in Munster. Two teams are eliminated at this stage while the winners advance to the semi-finals.

Semi-finals (2 matches): The winners of the quarter-finals join the Leinster and Munster champions to make up the semi-final pairings. Teams who may have already met in the provincial championships are kept apart in separate semi-finals where possible. Two teams are eliminated at this stage while the winners advance to the final.

Final (1 match): The two winners of the semi-finals contest this game.

=== All-Ireland knockout-stage allocation ===
	Teams entering in this round	Teams advancing from previous round
Quarter-finals (4 teams)	Leinster third-placed team; Munster third-placed team; Leinster runner-up; Munster runner-up	2 winning teams from the preliminary quarter-finals
Semi-finals (4 teams)	Leinster champion; Munster champion	2 winning teams from the quarter-finals
Final (2 teams)		2 winning teams from the semi-finals

=== Current championship pyramid ===
Teams from the first two levels are eligible for the All-Ireland series in that year. Teams from tiers 3 to 5 may reach tiers 1 and 2 through promotion.

Level	Total teams (36)	Championship	
1	11	Munster Senior Hurling Championship 5 counties – 0 relegations	Leinster Senior Hurling Championship 6 counties – 0 or 1 relegations
2	6	Joe McDonagh Cup 6 counties – 1 promotion, 0 or 1 relegations	
3	7	Christy Ring Cup 7 counties – 1 promotion, 1 relegation	
4	6	Nicky Rackard Cup 6 counties – 1 promotion, 1 relegation	
5	6	Lory Meagher Cup 6 counties – 1 promotion	

== Teams ==
=== 2027 Championship ===
Eleven counties are due to compete in the 2027 All-Ireland Senior Hurling Championship: six teams in the Leinster Senior Hurling Championship and five teams in the Munster Senior Hurling Championship.

County	Location	Stadium	Province	Position in 2026 Championship	First year in championship	In championship since	Current championship	Provincial titles	Last provincial title	Championship titles	Last championship title
Clare	Ennis	Cusack Park	Munster	Semi-finals	1887	1922	Munster Senior Hurling Championship	6	1998	5	2024
Cork	Cork	Páirc Uí Chaoimh	Munster	Semi-finals	1888	1920	Munster Senior Hurling Championship	55	2025	30	2005
Dublin	Donnycarney	Parnell Park	Leinster	Quarter-finals	1887	1917	Leinster Senior Hurling Championship	24	2013	6	1938
Galway	Salthill	Pearse Stadium	Connacht	Runners-up	1887	1919	Leinster Senior Hurling Championship	29	2026	5	2017
Kilkenny	Kilkenny	Nowlan Park	Leinster	4th (Leinster Senior Hurling Championship)	1887	1902	Leinster Senior Hurling Championship	77	2025	36	2015
Laois	Portlaoise	O'Moore Park	Leinster	Joe McDonagh Cup champions	1888	2027	Leinster Senior Hurling Championship	3	1949	1	1915
Limerick	Limerick	Gaelic Grounds	Munster	Champions	1888	1917	Munster Senior Hurling Championship	26	2026	13	2026
Offaly	Tullamore	O'Connor Park	Leinster	Quarter-finals	1896	2022	Leinster Senior Hurling Championship	9	1995	4	1998
Tipperary	Thurles	Semple Stadium	Munster	5th (Munster Senior Hurling Championship)	1887	1922	Munster Senior Hurling Championship	42	2016	29	2025
Waterford	Waterford	Walsh Park	Munster	4th (Munster Senior Hurling Championship)	1888	1922	Munster Senior Hurling Championship	9	2010	2	1959
Wexford	Wexford	Chadwicks Wexford Park	Leinster	5th (Leinster Senior Hurling Championship)	1887	1937	Leinster Senior Hurling Championship	21	2019	6	1996

== Venues ==
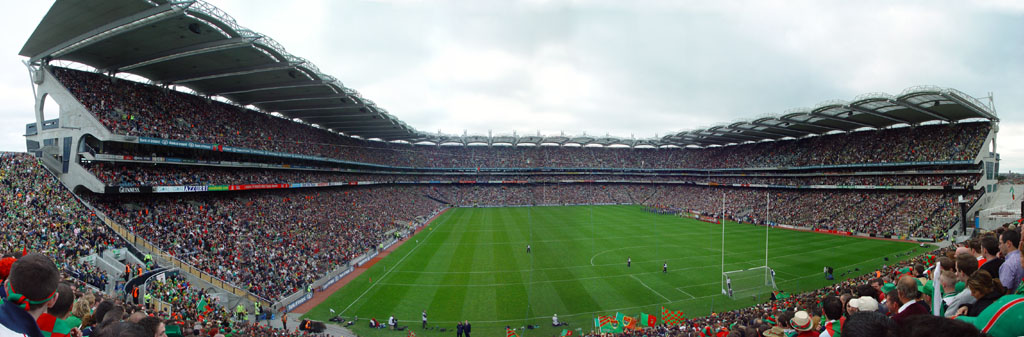
Croke Park in Dublin has hosted all but two finals since 1910.

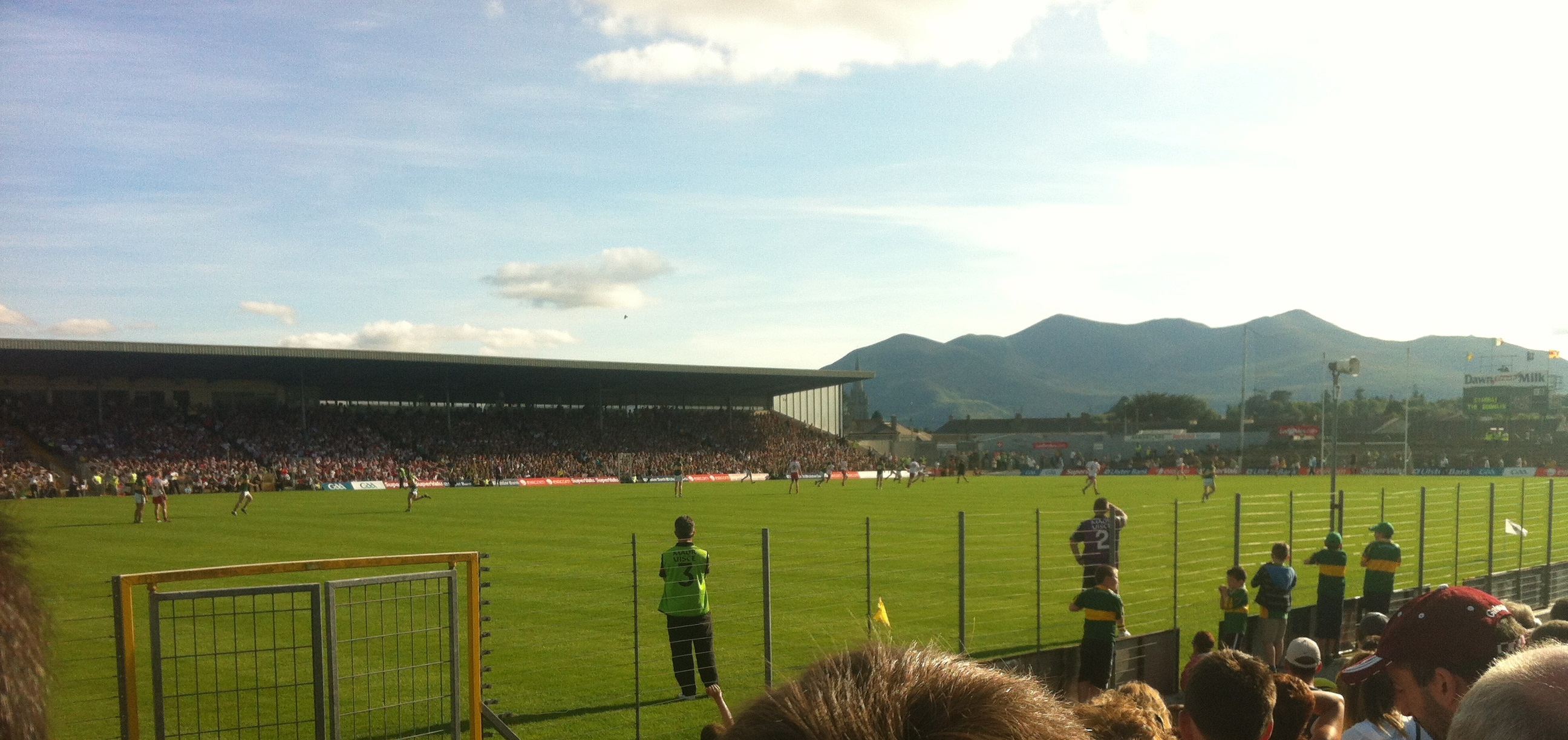
FitzGerald Stadium in Killarney was the venue for the 1937 final.

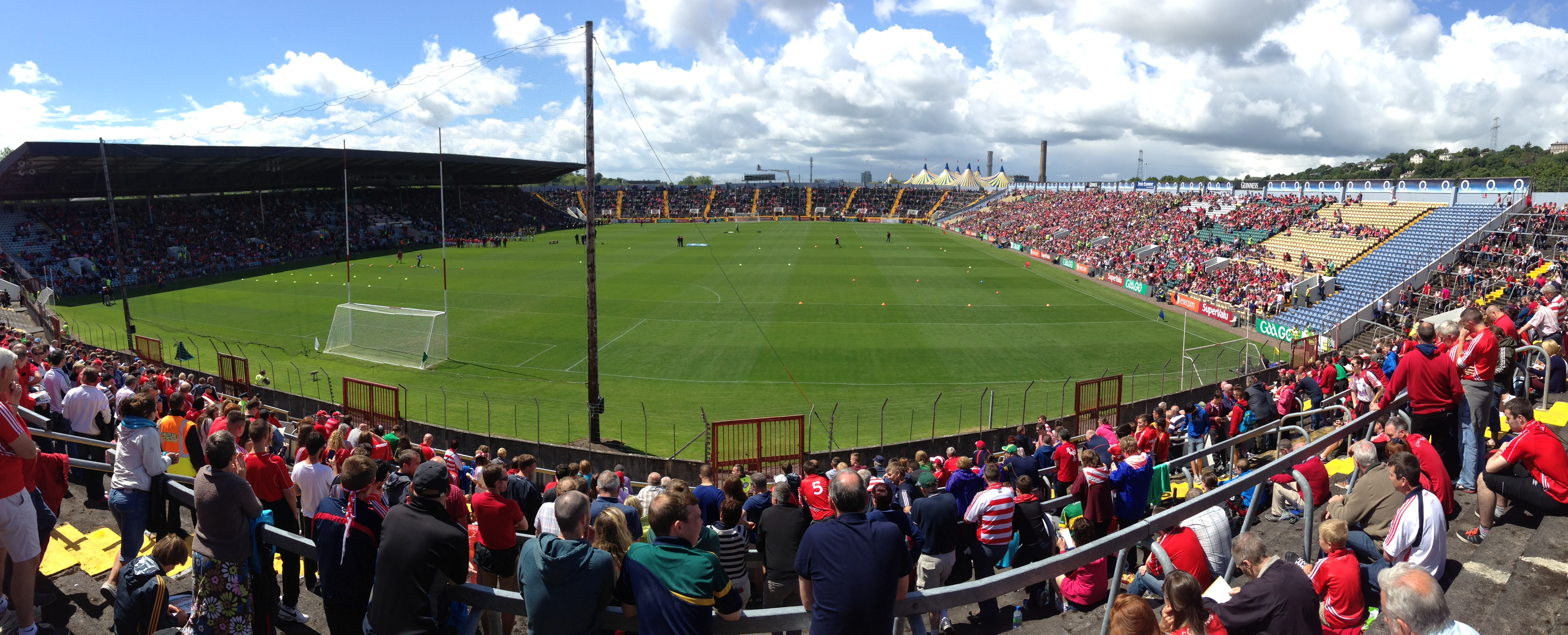
Páirc Uí Chaoimh in Cork hosted the semi-finals in 1976.

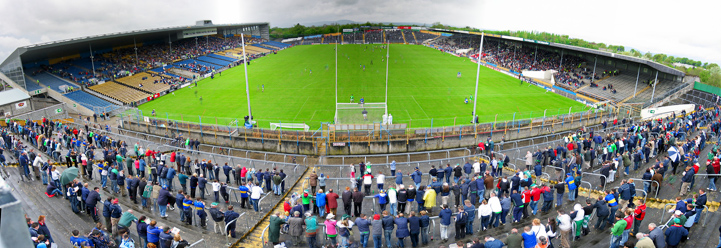
Semple Stadium in Thurles hosted the centenary year final in 1984.

=== Attendances ===
Stadium attendances are a significant source of regular income for the GAA and for the teams involved. For the 2017 championship, the average attendances for the five games was 56,565 with a total aggregate attendance figure of 282,826. The 2017 figure represented the highest combined total for an All-Ireland Championship since 2012, when 294,079 fans attended six games, including a final replay between Kilkenny and Galway. The highest all-time aggregate attendance for the championship was 332,387 in 2007 when eight games were played.

=== Quarter-finals ===
Croke Park was initially used as the venue for All-Ireland quarter-finals following their introduction in 1997. These games were usually played as a double-header. From 2008 until 2017 the quarter-finals were played at Semple Stadium in Thurles.

=== Semi-finals ===
The All-Ireland semi-finals have been played exclusively at Croke Park since 1977. Croke Park had been regularly used as a semi-final venue prior to this, however, a number of other stadiums around the country were also used. St Brendan's Park and St Cronan's Park were regularly used for semi-finals involving Kilkenny and Galway. Other regular semi-final venues included the Markets Field, Páirc Uí Chaoimh, St Ciarán's Park, the Cork Athletic Grounds and Cusack Park. Since introduction of the back door in 1997 less All Ireland hurling semi-finals involved Galway. Ulster team never reached the semi-final stage. If the pre 1997 system had stayed Ulster hurling champions would possibly be still playing in the All Ireland semi-finals.

=== Final ===
Since 1910, Croke Park has been the regular venue for the All-Ireland final. Only on two occasions since then has the final been played outside of Croke Park. Construction of the Cusack Stand in 1937 meant that that year's final was played at the newly opened FitzGerald Stadium in Killarney. In 1984 the GAA celebrated its centenary by playing the All-Ireland final at Semple Stadium in Thurles.

In the years prior to 1910, the All-Ireland final was held in a variety of locations around the country, including Jones's Road as Croke Park was known before its dedication to Thomas Croke. The inaugural final in 1887 was played at Birr, before Dublin venues Clonturk Park, the Pond Field and the Phoenix Park were used in the early 1890s. Fraher Field hosted the final on three occasions, while the final was played at the newly opened Cork Athletic Grounds on two occasions.

=== 2026 Stadia and Locations ===
Locations of the 2026 All-Ireland SHC teams.
Red: Munster SHC; Green: Leinster SHC.

County	Location	Province	Stadium	Capacity
Clare	Ennis	Munster	Cusack Park	19,000
Cork	Cork	Munster	Páirc Uí Chaoimh	45,000
Dublin	Dublin	Leinster	Croke Park	82,300
Galway	Galway	Connacht	Pearse Stadium	26,197
Kildare	Newbridge	Leinster	St Conleth's Park	8,200
Kilkenny	Kilkenny	Leinster	Nowlan Park	27,000
Limerick	Limerick	Munster	Gaelic Grounds	44,203
Offaly	Tullamore	Leinster	O'Connor Park	20,000
Tipperary	Thurles	Munster	Semple Stadium	45,690
Waterford	Waterford	Munster	Fraher Field	15,000
Wexford	Wexford	Leinster	Chadwicks Wexford Park	20,000

== Managers ==
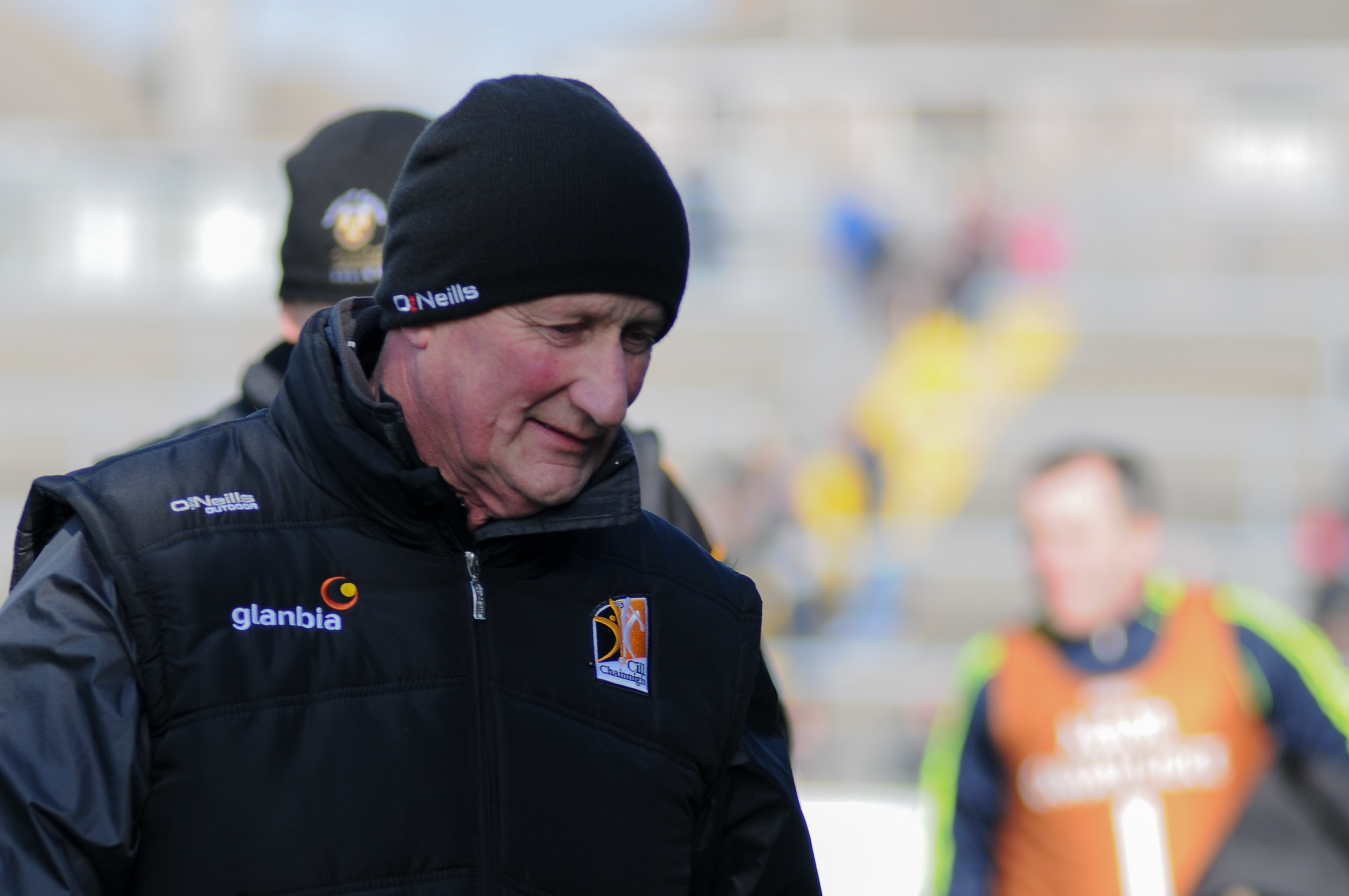
Brian Cody of Kilkenny is the most successful manager in the history of the championship.

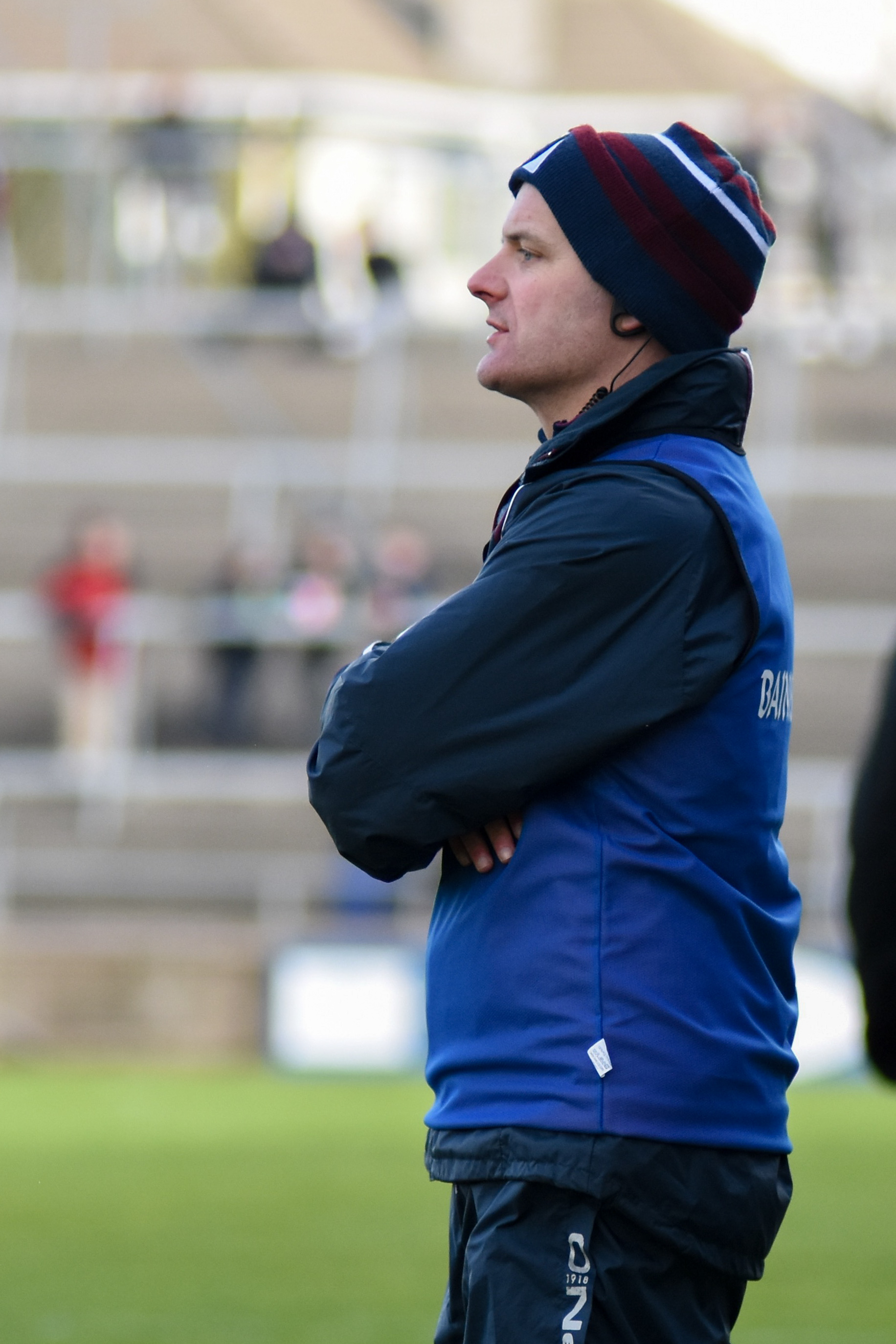
Micheál Donoghue managed Galway to the title in 2017. Also managed Dublin

Managers in the All-Ireland Championship are involved in the day-to-day running of the team, including the training, team selection, and sourcing of players from the club championships. Their influence varies from county-to-county and is related to the individual county boards. From 2018, all inter-county head coaches must be Award 2 qualified. The manager is assisted by a team of two or three selectors and an extensive backroom team consisting of various coaches. Prior to the development of the concept of a manager in the 1970s, teams were usually managed by a team of selectors with one member acting as chairman.

=== Winning managers ===
Winning managers (1957−2026)
Manager	Team	Wins	Winning years
Brian Cody	Kilkenny	11	2000, 2002, 2003, 2006, 2007, 2008, 2009, 2011, 2012, 2014, 2015
Tommy Maher	Kilkenny	7	1975, 1974, 1972, 1969, 1967, 1963, 1957
John Kiely	Limerick	6	2018, 2020, 2021, 2022, 2023, 2026
Bertie Troy	Cork	3	1976, 1977, 1978
Pat Henderson	Kilkenny	3	1979, 1982, 1983
Cyril Farrell	Galway	3	1980, 1987, 1988
Michael O'Brien	Cork	2	1984, 1990
Michael "Babs" Keating	Tipperary	2	1989, 1991
Ollie Walsh	Kilkenny	2	1992, 1993
Ger Loughnane	Clare	2	1995, 1997
Liam Sheedy	Tipperary	2	2010, 2019
Padge Kehoe	Wexford	1	1968
Donie Nealon	Tipperary	1	1971
Jackie Power	Limerick	1	1973
Eddie Keher	Kilkenny	1	1979
Andy Gallagher	Offaly	1	1981
Justin McCarthy	Cork	1	1984
Dermot Healy	Offaly	1	1985
Johnny Clifford	Cork	1	1986
Éamonn Cregan	Offaly	1	1994
Liam Griffin	Wexford	1	1996
Michael Bond	Offaly	1	1998
Jimmy Barry-Murphy	Cork	1	1999
Nicky English	Tipperary	1	2001
Donal O'Grady	Cork	1	2004
John Allen	Cork	1	2005
Davy Fitzgerald	Clare	1	2013
Michael Ryan	Tipperary	1	2016
Micheál Donoghue	Galway	1	2017
Brian Lohan	Clare	1	2024
Liam Cahill	Tipperary	1	2025

=== Current managers ===
#	Manager	County team	Appointed	Years as manager
1	John Kiely	Limerick	14 September 2016	10
2	Brian Lohan	Clare	31 October 2019	7
3	Liam Cahill	Tipperary	18 July 2022	4
4	Derek Lyng	Kilkenny	4 August 2022	4
5	Johnny Kelly	Offaly	5 September 2022	4
6	Keith Rossiter	Wexford	18 August 2023	3
7	Brian Dowling	Kildare	7 September 2023	3
8	Peter Queally	Waterford	09 August 2024	2
9	Micheál Donoghue	Galway	29 August 2024	2
10	Niall Ó Ceallacháin	Dublin	10 September 2024	2
11	Ben O'Connor	Cork	28 August 2025	1

== Trophy and medals ==
At the end of the All-Ireland final, the winning team is presented with a trophy. The Liam MacCarthy Cup is held by the winning team until the following year's final. Traditionally, the presentation is made at a special rostrum in the Ard Chomairle section of the Hogan Stand where GAA and political dignitaries and special guests view the match.

The cup is decorated with ribbons in the colours of the winning team. During the game the cup actually has both teams' sets of ribbons attached and the runners-up ribbons are removed before the presentation. The winning captain accepts the cup on behalf of his team before giving a short speech. Individual members of the winning team then have an opportunity to come to the rostrum to lift the cup.

The Liam MacCarthy Cup commemorates the memory of Liam MacCarthy. Born in London to Irish parents in 1851, he was prominently involved in the establishment of a county board in London in the 1890s. In 1922 he presented the GAA with £500 to commission a cup for the All-Ireland champions. The cup, which was constructed to look like a medieval Irish drinking vessel called a mather, was made by jeweller Edmund Johnson at his premises on Dublin's Grafton Street. It replaced the Great Southern Cup as the All-Ireland trophy and was first presented to Bob McConkey of Limerick in 1923.

Declan Carr of Tipperary was the last recipient of the original Liam MacCarthy Cup in 1991 before it was retired. It is now on display in the GAA Museum in Croke Park. JMK Gold & Silversmith's produced an exact replica which was first awarded to Liam Fennelly of Kilkenny in 1992.

In accordance with GAA rules, the Central Council awards up to twenty-six gold medals to the winners of the All-Ireland final. The medals are 9 carat gold and depict the design of the GAA. Trophies are awarded to the All-Ireland runners-up. A miniature replica of the Liam MacCarthy Cup is awarded to the captain of the winning team.

== Sponsorship ==
Since 1995, the All-Ireland Championship has been sponsored. The sponsor has usually been able to determine the championship's sponsorship name.

Period	Sponsor(s)	Name
1887−1994	No main sponsor	The All-Ireland Championship
1995−2007	Guinness	The Guinness Hurling Championship
2008−2009	RTÉ Sport, Etihad Airways, Guinness	The GAA Hurling All-Ireland Championship
2010−2012	Centra, Etihad Airways, Guinness	The GAA Hurling All-Ireland Championship
2013−2016	Centra, Etihad Airways, Liberty Insurance	The GAA Hurling All-Ireland Championship
2017−2019	Centra, Littlewoods Ireland, Bord Gáis Energy	The GAA Hurling All-Ireland Championship

== Media coverage ==
From the early 1920s, British Pathé recorded newsreel footage of the All-Ireland finals which was later shown in cinemas around the country. The National Film Institute and Gael Linn later produced their own newsreels of All-Ireland finals with Michael O'Hehir providing commentary. These newsreels were staples for cinema-goers until the 1960s.

Following the establishment of 2RN, Ireland's first radio broadcasting station, on 1 January 1926, sports coverage, albeit infrequent, was a feature of the schedules. Early broadcasts consisted of team announcements and short reports on events of interest. 2RN recorded a broadcasting first on 29 August 1926, when former hurler and journalist P.D. Mehigan carried a live commentary of the All-Ireland semi-final between Kilkenny and Galway. It was the first live radio broadcast of a field game outside of the United States. Although there was no designated sports department within Irish radio for many years, a two-way relationship between the national broadcaster and the GAA was quickly established. As well as exclusive live commentaries, Seán Ó Ceallacháin began broadcasting a weekly results programme on Radio Éireann in 1930.

When Telefís Éireann was established on 31 December 1961, the new station was interested in the broadcasting of championship games. The GAA, however, were wary that live television coverage would result in lower attendances at games. Because of this, the association restricted annual coverage of its games to the All-Ireland hurling and football finals, the two All-Ireland football semi-finals and the two Railway Cup finals. The first live broadcast of a hurling championship match was the All-Ireland final between Tipperary and Wexford on 2 September 1962. While the All-Ireland semi-finals were reintroduced in 1969, RTÉ was still confined to just broadcasting the final. In spite of this, highlights of the semi-finals were regularly shown.

The All-Ireland final between Tipperary and Kilkenny on 5 September 1971 was the first to be broadcast in colour.

The first All-Ireland semi-final to be broadcast live was the meeting of Cork and Galway on 7 August 1977. The popularity of the evening highlights programme led to the development of The Sunday Game, which was first broadcast on 8 July 1979. For the early years financial and logistical reasons restricted the programme to featuring just one full championship game and discussion about it. The show, however, soon expanded featuring coverage of one or more of the day's main championship games, followed by extended highlights of the other major games of the day.

The 1981 All-Ireland final between Offaly and Galway was simultaneously broadcast on RTÉ 1 and RTÉ 2, with Ger Canning providing commentary in the Irish language on the secondary channel.

In 1983, Channel 4 began broadcasting RTÉ's coverage of the All-Ireland final in Britain. This simulcast lasted until 1992 when the live broadcast was dropped; however, the entire match was shown at a later time.

In 2014, the GAA signed a three-year broadcasting deal with Sky Sports. While Sky were granted exclusive rights to some high-profile games, they were also permitted to broadcast live coverage of the All-Ireland semi-finals and final, however, these games were also broadcast live on RTÉ.

== Roll of honour ==
=== Performances by county ===
County	Title(s)	Runners-up	Winning years	Losing years
Kilkenny	36	29	1904, 1905, 1907, 1909, 1911, 1912, 1913, 1922, 1932, 1933, 1935, 1939, 1947, 1957, 1963, 1967, 1969, 1972, 1974, 1975, 1979, 1982, 1983, 1992, 1993, 2000, 2002, 2003, 2006, 2007, 2008, 2009, 2011, 2012, 2014, 2015	1893, 1895, 1897, 1898, 1916, 1926, 1931, 1936, 1937, 1940, 1945, 1946, 1950, 1959, 1964, 1966, 1971, 1973, 1978, 1987, 1991, 1998, 1999, 2004, 2010, 2016, 2019, 2022, 2023
Cork	30	22	1890, 1892, 1893, 1894, 1902, 1903, 1919, 1926, 1928, 1929, 1931, 1941, 1942, 1943, 1944, 1946, 1952, 1953, 1954, 1966, 1970, 1976, 1977, 1978, 1984, 1986, 1990, 1999, 2004, 2005	1901, 1904, 1905, 1907, 1912, 1915, 1920, 1927, 1939, 1947, 1956, 1969, 1972, 1982, 1983, 1992, 2003, 2006, 2013, 2021, 2024, 2025
Tipperary	29	13	1887, 1895, 1896, 1898, 1899, 1900, 1906, 1908, 1916, 1925, 1930, 1937, 1945, 1949, 1950, 1951, 1958, 1961, 1962, 1964, 1965, 1971, 1989, 1991, 2001, 2010, 2016, 2019, 2025	1909, 1911, 1913, 1917, 1922, 1960, 1967, 1968, 1988, 1997, 2009, 2011, 2014
Limerick	13	9	1897, 1918, 1921, 1934, 1936, 1940, 1973, 2018, 2020, 2021, 2022, 2023, 2026	1910, 1923, 1933, 1935, 1974, 1980, 1994, 1996, 2007
Dublin	6	15	1889, 1917, 1920, 1924, 1927, 1938	1892, 1894, 1896, 1906, 1908, 1919, 1921, 1930, 1934, 1941, 1942, 1944, 1948, 1952, 1961
Wexford	6	11	1910, 1955, 1956, 1960, 1968, 1996	1890, 1891, 1899, 1918, 1951, 1954, 1962, 1965, 1970, 1976, 1977
Galway	5	21	1923, 1980, 1987, 1988, 2017	1887, 1924, 1925, 1928, 1929, 1953, 1955, 1958, 1975, 1979, 1981, 1985, 1986, 1990, 1993, 2001, 2005, 2012, 2015, 2018, 2026
Clare	5	3	1914, 1995, 1997, 2013, 2024	1889, 1932, 2002
Offaly	4	3	1981, 1985, 1994, 1998	1984, 1995, 2000
Waterford	2	6	1948, 1959	1938, 1957, 1963, 2008, 2017, 2020
London	1	3	1901	1900, 1902, 1903
Laois	1	2	1915	1914, 1949
Kerry	1	0	1891	—
Antrim	0	2	—	1943, 1989

=== Performance by province ===
Province	Title(s)	Runners-up	Total
Munster	80	53	133
Leinster	53	60	113
Connacht	5	21	26
Britain	1	3	4
Ulster	0	2	2

The following counties have never won an All-Ireland in hurling:

Province	No.	Counties
Connacht	4	Leitrim, Mayo, Roscommon, Sligo
Leinster	7	Carlow, Kildare, Longford, Louth, Meath, Westmeath, Wicklow
Ulster	9	Antrim, Armagh, Cavan, Derry, Donegal, Down, Fermanagh, Monaghan, Tyrone
Britain	2	Glasgow, Lancashire
United States	1	New York

== Team records and statistics ==
=== Team results (since the introduction of the Joe McDonagh Cup) ===
Legend

- 1st – Champions
- 2nd – Runners-up
- SF – Semi-finals
- QF/PQF – Quarter-finals/Preliminary quarter-finals/Round 2/Round 1
- M/L/JM – Provincial Groups/Joe McDonagh Cup
- JM/L – Relegated
- L – Leinster Senior Hurling Championship
- M – Munster Senior Hurling Championship
- JM – Joe McDonagh Cup
- CR – Christy Ring Cup

For each year, the number of teams eligible for the All-Ireland (in brackets) are shown.

Team	2018 (16)	2019 (15)	2020 (10)	2021 (11)	2022 (17)	2023 (17)	2024 (17)	2025 (17)	Years
Antrim	JM	JM	JM	PR	PQF	L	L	L	7
Carlow	PQF	L	JM	JM	JM	PQF	L	JM	6
Clare	SF	M	QF	R2	SF	SF	1st	M	8
Cork	SF	QF	R2	2nd	QF	M	2nd	2nd	8
Down	CR	CR	CR	JM	JM	JM	JM	JM	4
Dublin	L	PQF	R1	QF	L	QF	QF	SF	8
Galway	2nd	L	SF	R2	SF	SF	L	QF	8
Kerry	JM	JM	JM	JM	PQF	JM	JM	JM	6
Kildare	CR	CR	CR	JM	CR	JM	CR	PQF	2
Kilkenny	QF	2nd	SF	SF	2nd	2nd	SF	SF	8
Laois	JM	QF	R1	R1	L	JM	PQF	PQF	8
Limerick	1st	SF	1st	1st	1st	1st	SF	QF	8
Meath	JM	CR	JM	JM	JM	CR	JM	CR	3
Offaly	L	JM	CR	CR	JM	PQF	PQF	L	6
Tipperary	M	1st	QF	QF	M	QF	M	1st	8
Waterford	M	M	2nd	SF	M	M	M	M	8
Westmeath	PQF	PQF	JM	JM	L	L	JM	JM	6
Wexford	QF	SF	R2	R1	QF	L	QF	L	8

=== Team success summary ===
Kilkenny are the most successful hurling county to date, having won the All-Ireland Hurling Championship the most times (36). Kilkenny have also been runners-up more often than any other team (29).

#	Team	Wins	Last win	Final losses	Last losing final	Final win ratio
1	Kilkenny	36	2015	29	2023	55%
2	Cork	30	2005	22	2025	58%
3	Tipperary	29	2025	13	2014	69%
4	Limerick	13	2026	9	2007	59%
5	Dublin	6	1938	15	1961	29%
5	Wexford	6	1996	11	1977	35%
7	Galway	5	2017	21	2026	19%
7	Clare	5	2024	3	2002	63%
9	Offaly	4	1998	3	2000	57%
10	Waterford	2	1959	6	2020	25%
11	London	1	1901	3	1903	25%
11	Laois	1	1915	2	1949	33%
11	Kerry	1	1891	0	—	100%
14	Antrim	0	—	2	1989	0%

- Only three teams have won the Championship on four consecutive occasions — Cork (1941–44), Kilkenny (2006–09) and Limerick (2020–23).
- Only four teams have won the Championship on three consecutive occasions - Cork (1892–94, 1941–44 (4 times), 1952–54 & 1976–78), Tipperary (1898–1900, 1949–51), Kilkenny (1911–13, 2006–09 (4 times)) and Limerick (2020-2023 (4 times)).
- Additionally, Galway (1987–1988) and Wexford (1955-1956) have both won back-to-back titles.
- Antrim hold the unfortunate record of appearing in two All-Ireland Finals (1943 and 1989) without ever winning the cup.

=== Debut of counties ===
Year	Debutants	Total
1887	Clare, Dublin, Galway, Kilkenny, Tipperary, Wexford	6
1888	Cork, Kildare, Laois, Limerick, Waterford	5
1889	Kerry, Louth	2
1890–95	None	0
1896	Offaly	1
1897–99	None	0
1900	Antrim, London, Sligo	3
1901	Derry, Roscommon	2
1902	Carlow, Meath	2
1903	Donegal, Longford	2
1904	None	0
1905	Down, Glasgow, Lancashire, Mayo	4
1906–07	None	0
1908	Cavan, Fermanagh	2
1909	Monaghan	1
1910–12	None	0
1913	Westmeath	1
1914	None	0
1915	Wicklow	1
1916–45	None	0
1946	Armagh	1
1947–95	None	0
1996	New York	1
1997–present	None	0
Total		34

- Leitrim and Tyrone are the only counties to have never competed in the All-Ireland Senior Hurling Championship.
- Fingal, South Down and Warwickshire have also never competed in the All-Ireland Senior Hurling Championship despite competing in lower tier cup competitions.

=== List of All-Ireland Senior Hurling Championship counties ===
The following teams have competed in the All-Ireland Championship for at least one season.

County	App.	Debut	Most recent	Championship titles	Last championship title	Best All-Ireland result
Antrim		1900	2025	0	—	Runners-up
Armagh		1946	—	0	—	Ulster runners-up
Carlow		1963	2025	0	—	Quarter-finals
Cavan		1908	1925	0	—	Ulster runners-up
Clare	132	1887	2026	5	2024	Champions
Cork	138	1888	2026	30	2005	Champions
Derry		1901	2004	0	—	Semi-finals
Donegal		1903	1946	0	—	Semi-finals
Down		1905	2025	0	—	Semi-finals
Dublin	134	1887	2026	6	1938	Champions
Fermanagh		1908	1946	0	—	Ulster semi-finals
Galway		1887	2026	5	2017	Champions
Glasgow	1	1913	1913	0	—	Semi-finals
Kerry		1889	2025	1	1891	Champions
Kildare		1888	2026	0	—	Quarter-finals
Kilkenny	131	1887	2026	36	2015	Champions
Laois		1888	2025	1	1915	Champions
Limerick	136	1888	2026	13	2026	Champions
Lancashire	1	1913	1913	0	—	Semi-finals
London		1900	2014	1	1901	Champions
Longford	2	1902	1903	0	—	Leinster first round
Louth	4	1889	1920	0	—	Leinster quarter-finals
Mayo	3	1905	1913	0	—	Semi-finals
Meath		1919	2024	0	—	Quarter-finals
Monaghan		1909	1946	0	—	Ulster runners-up
New York	6	1996	2004	0	—	Quarter-finals
Offaly		1897	2026	4	1998	Champions
Roscommon	20	1901	1999	0	—	Semi-finals
Sligo	2	1900	1913	0	—	Connacht runners-up
Tipperary	133	1887	2026	29	2025	Champions
Waterford	126	1888	2026	2	1959	Champions
Westmeath		1913	2025	0	—	Quarter-finals
Wexford	127	1887	2026	6	1996	Champions
Wicklow		1943	2004	0	—	Leinster quarter-finals

== Player records ==
=== Player of the year ===
Year	Player	County
2025	John McGrath	Tipperary
2024	Shane O'Donnell	Clare
2023	Aaron Gillane	Limerick
2022	Diarmaid Byrnes	Limerick
2021	Cian Lynch (2)	Limerick
2020	Gearóid Hegarty	Limerick
2019	Séamus Callanan	Tipperary
2018	Cian Lynch	Limerick
2017	Joe Canning	Galway
2016	Austin Gleeson	Waterford
2015	T. J. Reid	Kilkenny
2014	Richie Hogan	Kilkenny
2013	Tony Kelly	Clare
2012	Henry Shefflin (3)	Kilkenny
2011	Michael Fennelly	Kilkenny
2010	Lar Corbett	Tipperary
2009	Tommy Walsh	Kilkenny
2008	Eoin Larkin	Kilkenny
2007	Dan Shanahan	Waterford
2006	Henry Shefflin (2)	Kilkenny

=== Scoring records ===
All-time top scorers in the All-Ireland Senior Hurling Championship (Championship scores only)
Rank	Player	Team	Goals	Points	Tally	Games	Era	Average
1	**T. J. Reid**	Kilkenny	43	672	801	99	2008–present	8.1
2	Patrick Horgan	Cork	32	683	779	90	2008–2025	8.65
3	Joe Canning	Galway	27	486	567	62	2008–2021	9.3
4	Henry Shefflin	Kilkenny	27	484	565	71	1999–2014	8.0
5	Eddie Keher	Kilkenny	35	336	441	50	1959–1977	8.8
6	Eoin Kelly	Tipperary	21	369	432	63	2000–2014	6.8
7	**Lee Chin**	Wexford	14	380	422	62	2011–present	6.8
8	**Tony Kelly**	Clare	19	361	418	70	2012–present	5.9
9	**Aaron Gillane**	Limerick	20	320	380	48	2017–present	7.9
10	Séamus Callanan	Tipperary	40	226	343	66	2008–2023	5.1
11	Christy Ring	Cork	33	208	307	65	1940–1963	4.7
12	**Stephen Bennett**	Waterford	16	241	289	46	2016–present	6.1
13	D. J. Carey	Kilkenny	33	188	287	57	1989–2005	5.0
As of 24 May 2026 (Bold denotes players still active)

==== Scoring statistics ====
- In 1971 Eddie Keher of Kilkenny broke his own record of 14 points from the 1963 final by capturing 2–11 against Tipperary (although his team lost). This record was broken by Nicky English of Tipperary in 1989 when he scored 2–12 against Antrim. Keher's tally of 6–45 in the 1972 championship is also a record.
- The official hurling records owned and published by Croke Park, and authenticated by the county historians of participating counties, note three records. (This information comes from p. 40 of official programme published the GAA on the day of 2005 final between Cork and Galway).
- (1) The 80 minute final. This 80 minute final took place in 1971 between Tipperary and Kilkenny. Eddie Keher scored 2-11 which makes a total of 17 points. However 2-8 of this was scored from frees. (2) The record for all 70 minute finals. This record was made in 1989. This hurling final was between Tipperary and Antrim. Nicholas English scored 2-12 points which equals a total of 18 points. However 0-9 of this was achieved from frees. (3) The 60 minute final: The overall scoring record is held by Michael Gah Ahern the greatest sharpshooter of the 1920s and early 1930s. He scored 5–4. What makes this scoring record remarkable is that he scored all of his scores from his hands.
- Nicky Rackard of Wexford got the highest total in a championship game. In Wexford's 12−17 to 2–3 defeat of Antrim in the 1954 semi-final, he scored a remarkable 7-7.
- Prior to the 1930s, scoring records for championship games were rarely kept. A number of players have been credited with enormous tallies. Andy 'Dooric' Buckley scored at least 6 goals when Cork beat Kilkenny by 8–9 to 0–8 in the 1903 All-Ireland 'home' final. Other newspaper reports credit him with 7 goals and 4 points.
- P. J. Riordan is alleged to have scored all but 1 point of Tipperary's total when they beat Kilkenny by 6–8 to 0−1 in the 1895 All-Ireland final.
- Jimmy Kelly of Kilkenny is said to have scored 7 goals in 30 minutes against Cork in the replay of the 1905 final.
- In 1990 the rule prohibiting a hand-passed score was introduced. This had a large bearing on scoring, with fewer goals being scored in open play.

== Championship Tiers ==
=== Title Holders ===
Competition	Year	Champions	Title	Runners-up	Next edition
All-Ireland Senior Hurling Championship	2026	Limerick	13th	Galway	2027
Leinster Senior Hurling Championship	2026	Galway	4th	Dublin	2027
Munster Senior Hurling Championship	2026	Limerick	26th	Cork	2027
Joe McDonagh Cup	2026	Laois	2nd	Carlow	2027
Christy Ring Cup	2026	Derry	1st	Kerry	2027
Nicky Rackard Cup	2026	New York	1st	Tyrone	2027
Lory Meagher Cup	2026	Longford	3rd	Leitrim	2027

=== 2027 Teams ===
Championship	County team	Province
Munster SHC	Clare	Munster
Munster SHC	Cork	Munster
Munster SHC	Limerick	Munster
Munster SHC	Tipperary	Munster
Munster SHC	Waterford	Munster
Leinster SHC	Dublin	Leinster
Leinster SHC	Galway	Connacht
Leinster SHC	Kilkenny	Leinster
Leinster SHC	Laois	Leinster
Leinster SHC	Offaly	Leinster
Leinster SHC	Wexford	Leinster
Joe McDonagh Cup	Antrim	Ulster
Joe McDonagh Cup	Carlow	Leinster
Joe McDonagh Cup	Derry	Ulster
Joe McDonagh Cup	Down	Ulster
Joe McDonagh Cup	Kildare	Leinster
Joe McDonagh Cup	Westmeath	Leinster
Christy Ring Cup	Kerry	Munster
Christy Ring Cup	Donegal	Ulster
Christy Ring Cup	London	Britain
Christy Ring Cup	Meath	Leinster
Christy Ring Cup	New York	United States
Christy Ring Cup	Roscommon	Connacht
Christy Ring Cup	Wicklow	Leinster
Nicky Rackard Cup	Fermanagh	Ulster
Nicky Rackard Cup	Longford	Leinster
Nicky Rackard Cup	Louth	Leinster
Nicky Rackard Cup	Mayo	Connacht
Nicky Rackard Cup	Sligo	Connacht
Nicky Rackard Cup	Tyrone	Ulster
Lory Meagher Cup	Armagh	Ulster
Lory Meagher Cup	Cavan	Ulster
Lory Meagher Cup	Lancashire	Britain
Lory Meagher Cup	Leitrim	Connacht
Lory Meagher Cup	Monaghan	Ulster
Lory Meagher Cup	Warwickshire	Britain

=== Former championships ===
- All-Ireland Senior B Hurling Championship
- All-Ireland Intermediate Hurling Championship
- All-Ireland Junior Hurling Championship
- Connacht Senior Hurling Championship
- Ulster Senior Hurling Championship

== See also ==
- All-Ireland Senior Football Championship
- All-Ireland Senior Hurling Championship records and statistics
- All-Ireland Senior Club Hurling Championship
- List of Gaelic games competitions
- Munster Senior Hurling Championship
- Leinster Senior Hurling Championship
- Ulster Senior Hurling Championship
- Connacht Senior Hurling Championship
- Joe McDonagh Cup (Tier 2)
- Christy Ring Cup (Tier 3)
- Nicky Rackard Cup (Tier 4)
- Lory Meagher Cup (Tier 5)
