= Darren Morrissey =

Irish hurler

Personal information
- Native name: Darán Ó Muireasa (Irish)
- Born: 1999 (age 26–27) Bullaun, County Galway, Ireland
- Occupation: Secondary school teacher
- Height: 6 ft 1 in (185 cm)

Sport
- Sport: Hurling
- Position: Left corner-back
Club
- Years: Club
- 2017-present: Sarsfields
Club titles
- Galway titles: 0
College
- Years: College
- University of Galway
College titles
- Fitzgibbon titles: 0
Inter-county*
Years	County	Apps (scores)
2019-present	Galway	34 (0–06)
Inter-county titles
- Leinster titles: 1
- All-Irelands: 0
- NHL: 1
- All Stars: 1
- *Inter County team apps and scores correct as of 21:36, 7 July 2026.

Darren Morrissey (born 1999) is an Irish hurler. At club level, he plays with Sarsfields and at inter-county level with the Galway senior hurling team.

== Career ==
Morrissey attended St. Raphael's College in Loughrea and played hurling at all levels during his time there. He won a Connacht PPS SBHC medal in 2016, after a 3–13 to 0–13 win over St Cuan's in the final. Morrissey later played in the Fitzgibbon Cup with the University of Galway. At club level, he plays with Sarsfields.

At inter-county level, Morrissey first appeared for Galway during a two-year tenure with the minor team. Injury impeded his first season, however, he captained the team to the All-Ireland MHC title in 2017, following a 2–17 to 2–15 win over Cork in the final. Morrissey was also named on the Minor Team of the Year. He subsequently progressed to the under-20 team.

Morrissey made his senior team debut in a National Hurling League game against Carlow in February 2019. He claimed his first senior silverware in 2021, when Galway shared the National League title with Kilkenny. Morrissey was team captain when Galway beat Dublin by 4–29 to 4–15 to win the Leinster SHC title in 2026.

Morrissey was named as the new Galway captain ahead of the 2026 season.

== Honours ==
St. Raphael's College

- Connacht PPS Senior B Hurling Championship (1): 2016

Galway

- Leinster Senior Hurling Championship (1): 2026 (c)
- National Hurling League (1): 2021
- All-Ireland Minor Hurling Championship (1): 2017 (c)

Awards

- GAA GPA All Stars Awards (1): 2026

Sporting positions
Preceded by Jack Fitzpatrick	Galway minor hurling team captain 2017	Succeeded by Seán Neary
Preceded by Conor Whelan	Galway senior hurling team captain 2026-	Succeeded by Incumbent
Achievements
Preceded by Brian McGrath	All-Ireland Minor Hurling Final winning captain 2017	Succeeded by Seán Neary
