= 2026 Nicky Rackard Cup =

Hurling competition

- Corn Niocláis Mhic Riocaird

Tournament details
- Level: 4
- Year: 2026
- Trophy: Nicky Rackard Cup
- Dates: 12 April - 30 May 2026
- Teams: 7

Winners
- Champions: New York (1st win)
- Manager: Richie Hartnett
- Captain: Johnny Glynn
- Qualify for: Nicky Rackard Cup Knockout Stage

Runners-up
- Runners-up: Tyrone
- Manager: Stephen McGarry
- Captain: Aidan Kelly

Promotion/Relegation
- Promoted team(s): New York
- Relegated team(s): Armagh

The 2026 Nicky Rackard Cup will be the twenty-second edition of the Nicky Rackard Cup since its establishment by the Gaelic Athletic Association in 2005 and is the fourth-tier of Hurling for senior county teams (the All-Ireland Senior Hurling Championship is the first-tier trophy). It is contested by six GAA county teams ranked 24–30 in the 2026 All-Ireland Senior Hurling Championship. The competition runs from 12 April to 30/31 May 2026.

Roscommon, winner of the 2025 final, were promoted to the Christy Ring Cup, replaced by Tyrone who were relegated to this competition. New York were promoted from the Lory Meagher Cup.

The second-placed team from the round robin stage will play off against New York in the semi-final.

The top team from the round robin stage will then play off against the semi-final winner in the final to decide the winner of the competition. The Nicky Rackard Cup Final will be played on 30/31 May 2026 at Croke Park in Dublin.

The bottom team from the round robin stage will be relegated to the Lory Meagher Cup. New York will remain in the competition for three years, during which period they must win at least one semi-final to maintain their status, or be relegated back to the Lory Meagher Cup. As such, they cannot be relegated in 2026. If New York win the cup, they will not be promoted and no team will be relegated from the Christy Ring Cup

== Team changes ==
=== To Championship ===
Relegated from the Christy Ring Cup

- Tyrone

Promoted from the Lory Meagher Cup

- New York

=== From Championship ===
Promoted to the Christy Ring Cup

- Roscommon

== Format ==
=== Cup format ===
Initially six teams play the each other five teams in single round-robin matches. The second-placed team after the round robin games will compete against New York in the Nicky Rackard Cup Semi-Final. The top team after the round robin games compete in the Nicky Rackard Cup Final.

==== Promotion ====
The Nicky Rackard Cup champions are automatically promoted to the following year's Christy Ring Cup and are replaced by the bottom-placed team in the Christy Ring Cup.

==== Relegation ====
The bottom-placed team in the Nicky Rackard Cup are automatically relegated to the following year's Lory Meagher Cup and are replaced by the Lory Meagher Cup champions.

Once promoted, New York will have a 3-year period in which to win a semi-final or they will be automatically Relegated to the next lowest Tier. Should New York win a semi-final but remain in a given Tier, a new 3-year period will commence in which they must win a semi-final or be automatically Relegated to the next lowest Tier.

=== Teams by Province ===
The participating teams, listed by province, with numbers in parentheses indicating final positions in the 2026 National Hurling League before the championship were:

Connacht (2)

- Mayo (21)
- Sligo (29)

Leinster (1)

- Louth (26)

Munster (0)

- None participated

Ulster (3)

- Armagh (28)
- Fermanagh (27)
- Tyrone (25)

North America (1)

- New York (DNP)

== Teams ==
=== General Information ===
County	Last Cup Title	Last Provincial Title	Last All-Ireland Title	Position in 2025 Championship	Appearance
Armagh	2012	—	—	3rd	17th
Fermanagh	—	—	—	6th	9th
Louth	—	—	—	5th	18th
Mayo	2021	1909	—	Runners-Up	7th
New York	—	—	—	Champions (Lory Meagher Cup)	1st
Sligo	2019	—	—	4th	13th
Tyrone	2022	—	—	6th (Christy Ring Cup)	16th

=== Personnel and kits ===
County	Manager (s)	Captain(s)	Sponsor
Armagh	Karl McKeegan	Barry Shortt and Odhrán Curry	Simplyfruit
Fermanagh	Daithí Hand and Peter Galvin	Ódhrán Johnston	Belter Tech
Louth	Paddy McArdle and Diarmuid Murphy	Conor Clancy	STATSports
Mayo	Ray Larkin	Eoghan Collins	Intersport Elverys
New York	Richie Hartnett	Johnny Glynn	Navillus Contracting
Sligo	Tom Hennessey	Kevin O'Kennedy and Andrew Kilcullen	Clayton Hotels
Tyrone	Stephen McGarry	Aidan Kelly	McAleer & Rushe

== Group Stage ==
=== Table ===
Pos	Team	Pld	W	D	L	SF	SA	Diff	Pts	Qualification
1	Tyrone	5	5	0	0	21-84	6-89	+40	10	Advance to Final
2	Mayo	5	4	0	1	10-128	9-76	+55	8	Advance to Semi-Final
3	Sligo	5	3	0	2	8-124	10-67	+51	6	
4	Louth	5	2	0	3	6-78	8-106	-34	4	
5	Fermanagh	5	1	0	4	7-71	10-122	-60	2	
6	Armagh (R)	5	0	0	5	9-82	18-107	-52	0	Relegated to Lory Meagher Cup

=== Round 1 ===
11 April 2026 Round 1	Armagh	2-07 (13) - (31) 2-25	Mayo	Armagh
13:30				Stadium: BOX-IT Athletic Grounds; Referee: Matthew Redmond

11 April 2026 Round 1	Tyrone	4-10 (22) - (15) 0-15	Sligo	Garvaghey
14:00				Referee: Derek Argue

11 April 2026 Round 1	Louth	1-16 (19) - (15) 0-15	Fermanagh	Dowdallshill
15:00				Stadium: Protection & Prosperity Louth CoE; Referee: Seaghan Walsh

=== Round 2 ===
18 April 2026 Round 2	Fermanagh	2-20 (26) - (25) 1-22	Armagh	Enniskillen
15:00				Stadium: Brewster Park

18 April 2026 Round 2	Sligo	1-31 (34) - (10) 0-10	Louth	Sligo
15:00				Stadium: Markievicz Park

19 April 2026 Round 2	Mayo	1-25 (28) - (31) 5-16	Tyrone	Castlebar
13:30				Stadium: Hastings Insurance MacHale Park

=== Round 3 ===
25 April 2026 Round 3	Louth	2-14 (20) - (25) 1-22	Tyrone	Dowdallshill
15:00				Stadium: Protection & Prosperity Louth CoE

26 April 2026 Round 3	Fermanagh	1-13 (16) - (40) 2-34	Mayo	Enniskillen
14:00				Stadium: Brewster Park

26 April 2026 Round 3	Sligo	3-28 (37) - (21) 2-15	Armagh	Tubbercurry
14:00				Stadium: Kilcoyne Park

=== Round 4 ===
9 May 2026 Round 4	Mayo	2-22 (28) - (24) 1-21	Sligo	Castlebar
13:00				Stadium: Hastings Insurance MacHale Park

9 May 2026 Round 4	Armagh	3-16 (25) - (28) 3-19	Louth	Armagh
14:00				Stadium: BOX-IT Athletic Grounds

9 May 2026 Round 4	Tyrone	3-21 (30) - (19) 2-13	Fermanagh	Garvaghey
14:00

=== Round 5 ===
16 May 2026 Round 5	Louth	0-19 (19) - (31) 3-22	Mayo	Darver
13:15				Stadium: Protection & Prosperity Louth CoE

16 May 2026 Round 5	Sligo	3-29 (38) - (16) 2-10	Fermanagh	Sligo
13:15				Stadium: Markievicz Park

16 May 2026 Round 5	Tyrone	8-15 (39) - (25) 1-22	Armagh	Garvaghey
13:15

== Knockout Stage ==
=== Bracket ===
Semi-Final		Final
		Tyrone	2-17
New York	4-18	New York	2-22
Mayo	1-18

=== Semi-Final ===
24 May 2025 Semi-Final	New York	4-18 (30) – (21) 1-18	Mayo	Longford
14:00				Venue: Glennon Brothers Pearse Park
				Referee: Ciarán O'Donovan

=== Final ===
30 May 2026 Final	Tyrone	2-17 (23) – (28) 2-22	New York	Dublin
13:00		(HT: 1-10 - 1-14)		Venue: Croke Park
				TV: Spórt TG4

== Stadia and locations ==
Locations of the 2026 Nicky Rackard counties.

County	Location	Province	Stadium(s)	Capacity
Neutral	Dublin	Leinster	Croke Park	82,300
Armagh	Armagh	Ulster	Athletic Grounds	18,500
Fermanagh	Enniskillen	Ulster	Brewster Park	20,000
Louth	Drogheda	Leinster	Drogheda Park	3,500
Mayo	Castlebar	Connacht	MacHale Park	25,369
New York	Bronx	USA	Gaelic Park	2,000
Sligo	Sligo	Connacht	Markievicz Park	18,558
Tyrone	Carrickmore	Ulster	Páirc Colmcille	

2026 Nicky Rackard Cup (New York)

== Statistics ==
=== Top scorers ===
Overall

Rank	Player	County	Tally	Total	Matches	Average
1						
2						
3						
4						
5						
6						
7						
8						
9						
10						

In a single game

Rank	Player	County	Tally	Total	Opposition
1					
2					
3					
4					
5					
6					
7					
8					
9					
10					

=== Scoring events ===
- Widest winning margin: 24 points
  - Sligo 1–31 — 0–10 Louth (Round 2)
  - Fermanagh 1–13 — 2–34 Mayo (Round 3)
- Most goals in a match: 9
  - Tyrone 8–15 — 1–22 Armagh (Round 5)
- Most points in a match: 47
  - Fermanagh 1–13 — 2–34 Mayo (Round 3)
- Most goals by one team in a match: 8
  - Tyrone 8–15 — 1–22 Armagh (Round 5)
- Most points by one team in a match: 34
  - Fermanagh 1–13 — 2–34 Mayo (Round 3)
- Highest aggregate score: 64 points
  - Tyrone 8–15 — 1–22 Armagh (Round 5)
- Lowest aggregate score: 34 points
  - Louth1–16 — 0–15 Fermanagh (Round 1)
- Hat-trick Heros:
  - Liam Griffiths (Tyrone) 4-01 v Armagh (Round 5)
  - AJ Willis (New York) 3-02 v Mayo (Semi-Final)

== See also ==
- 2026 All-Ireland Senior Hurling Championship
- 2026 Leinster Senior Hurling Championship
- 2026 Munster Senior Hurling Championship
- 2026 Joe McDonagh Cup (Tier 2)
- 2026 Christy Ring Cup (Tier 3)
- 2026 Lory Meagher Cup (Tier 5)
