= 2026 Munster Senior Hurling Championship =

Gaelic sports contest in Ireland

Munster Senior Hurling Championship
Tournament details
- Province: Munster
- Year: 2026
- Trophy: The Mick Mackey Cup
- Date: 19 April - 7 June 2026
- Teams: 5
- Defending champions: Cork

Winners
- Champions: Limerick (26th win)
- Manager: John Kiely
- Captain: Cian Lynch
- Qualify for: Munster SHC Final; All-Ireland SHC

Runners-up
- Runners-up: Cork
- Manager: Ben O’Connor
- Captain: Mark Coleman

Other
- Website: https://munster.gaa.ie/

The 2026 Munster Senior Hurling Championship is the 139th edition of the Munster Senior Hurling Championship since its establishment by the Munster Council in 1888 and is the highest-tier of Hurling for senior county teams in Munster. It is contested by five Munster GAA county teams ranked 1–5 in the 2025 All-Ireland Senior Hurling Championship.

The competition began on 19 April with the final on 7 June.

== Format ==
=== Group stage (10 matches) ===
Each team plays each other once. The 1st and 2nd placed teams advanc to the Munster SHC final and the 3rd placed team advances to the All-Ireland SHC quarter-finals.

=== Final (1 match) ===
The top 2 teams in the group stage contested this game. The Munster champions advanced to the All-Ireland SHC semi-finals and the Munster runners-up advanced to the All-Ireland SHC quarter-finals.

== Teams ==
=== General Information ===
Five counties contested the 2026 Munster Senior Hurling Championship:

County	Last Championship Title	Last All-Ireland Title	Position in 2025 Championship
Clare	1998	2024	4th
Cork	2025	2005	Champions
Limerick	2024	2023	Runners-up
Tipperary	2016	2025	3rd
Waterford	2010	1959	5th

=== Personnel and Kits ===
County	Manager	Captain(s)	Sponsor
Clare	Brian Lohan	Conor Cleary	Pat O'Donnell
Cork	Ben O'Connor	Darragh Fitzgibbon	Sports Direct
Limerick	John Kiely	Cian Lynch	JP McManus
Tipperary	Liam Cahill	Ronan Maher	Clover
Waterford	Peter Queally	Conor Prunty	Suir Engineering

== Group Stage ==
=== Table ===
Pos	Team	Pld	W	D	L	SF	SA	Diff	Pts	Qualification
1	Cork	4	4	0	0	4-107	3-84	+26	8	Advance to Munster Final
2	Limerick	4	3	0	1	10-109	5-85	+39	6	Advance to Munster Final
3	Clare	4	2	0	2	5-90	7-98	-14	4	Advance to All-Ireland Quarter-Finals
4	Waterford	4	0	1	3	9-90	6-118	–19	1	
5	Tipperary	4	0	1	3	2-94	9-105	–32	1	

=== Fixtures ===
==== Round 1 ====
19 April 2026 Round 1	Clare	2-33 (39) - (33) 4-21	Waterford	Ennis
14:00				Stadium: Zimmer Biomet Páirc Chíosóg; Attendance: 18,338

19 April 2026 Round 1	Tipperary	1-22 (25) - (29) 0-29	Cork	Thurles
16:00				Stadium: FBD Semple Stadium; Attendance: 44,348

==== Round 2 ====
26 April 2026 Round 2	Cork	2-22 (28) - (26) 1-23	Limerick	Cork
14:00				Stadium: SuperValu Páirc Uí Chaoimh

26 April 2026 Round 2	Waterford	3-24 (33) - (33) 1-30	Tipperary	Waterford
16:00				Stadium: Azzuri Walsh Park

==== Round 3 ====
3 May 2026 Round 3	Clare	1-18 (21) - (36) 2-30	Limerick	Ennis
16:00				Stadium: Zimmer Biomet Páirc Chíosóg

9 May 2026 Round 3	Waterford	0-25 (25) - (29) 1-26	Cork	Waterford
16:00				Stadium: Azzurri Walsh Park; Attendance: 20,187

==== Round 4 ====
16 May 2026 Round 4	Tipperary	0-17 (17) – (28) 1-25	Clare	Thurles
19:00		Report		Stadium: FBD Semple Stadium

17 May 2026 Round 4	Limerick	2-29 (35) – (26) 2-20	Waterford	Limerick
15:00				Stadium: TUS Gaelic Grounds

==== Round 5 ====
24 May 2026 Round 5	Cork	1-30 (33) - (17) 1-14	Clare	Cork
16:00				Stadium: SuperValu Páirc Uí Chaoimh

24 May 2026 Round 5	Limerick	5-27 (42) - (25) 0-25	Tipperary	Limerick
16:00				Stadium: TUS Gaelic Grounds

== Munster Final ==
7 June 2026
14:00
Munster Final

Cork	2-17–1-21	Limerick

SuperValu Páirc Uí Chaoimh, Cork
Attendance: 43,365

== Stadia and Locations ==
Locations of the 2025 Munster SHC teams

County	Location	Province	Stadium	Capacity
Clare	Ennis	Munster	Cusack Park	21,000
Cork	Cork	Munster	Páirc Uí Chaoimh	45,000
Limerick	Limerick	Munster	Gaelic Grounds	44,023
Tipperary	Thurles	Munster	Semple Stadium	45,690
Waterford	Waterford	Munster	Walsh Park	12,100

== Attendance ==
Attendances
Matches	11
Total attendance	319,646
Average attendance	29,059
Highest attendance	43,369; Cork 2-22 (28) - (26) 1-23 Limerick; 26 April 2026; Páirc Uí Chaoimh

== Championship Statistics ==
=== Top Scorers ===
==== Top Scorer Overall ====
Rank	Player	County	Tally	Total	Matches	Average
1	Aidan O'Connor	Limerick	3-39	48	5	12
2	Alan Connolly	Cork	1-42	45	5	11.25
3	Stephen Bennett	Waterford	4-24	36	4	9
4	Tony Kelly	Clare	1-19	22	4	5.5
5	Mark Rodgers	Clare	0-21	21	4	5.25
6	Diarmuid Byrnes	Limerick	3-11	20	5	5
7	Darragh McCarthy	Tipperary	0-19	19	4	4.75
8	Brian Hayes	Cork	2-13	19	5	4.75
9	William Buckley	Cork	0-17	17	5	4.25
10	Dessie Hutchinson	Waterford	0-16	16	4	4

In A Single Game

Rank	Player	County	Tally	Total	Opposition
1					
2					
3					
4					
5					
6					
7					
8					
9					
10					

=== Scoring Events ===
- Widest winning margin: 17 points
  - Limerick 5–27 — 0–25 Tipperary (Round 5)
- Most goals in a match: 6
  - Clare 2–33 — 4–21 Waterford (Round 1)
- Most points in a match: 54
  - Clare 2–33 — 4–21 Waterford (Round 1)
  - Waterford 3–24 — 1–30 Tipperary (Round 2)
- Most goals by one team in a match: 5
  - Limerick 5–27 — 0–25 Tipperary (Round 5)
- Most points by one team in a match: 33
  - Clare 2–33 — 4–21 Waterford (Round 1)
- Highest aggregate score: 72 points
  - Clare 2–33 — 4–21 Waterford (Round 1)
- Lowest aggregate score: 45 points
  - Tipperary 0–17 — 1–25 Clare (Round 4)
- Hat-trick Heros:
  - Stephen Bennett (Waterford) 3-12 v Clare (Round 1)

== See also ==
- 2026 All-Ireland Senior Hurling Championship
- 2026 Leinster Senior Hurling Championship
- 2026 Joe McDonagh Cup (Tier 2)
- 2026 Christy Ring Cup (Tier 3)
- 2026 Nicky Rackard Cup (Tier 4)
- 2026 Lory Meagher Cup (Tier 5)
