= Brian Hayes =

Brian Hayes may refer to:

- Brian Hayes, former Republican Party labor policy director and member of the National Labor Relations Board in the United States
- Brian Hayes (broadcaster) (1937–2025), Australian broadcaster, worked in the UK for the BBC and Independent Radio, and on Not Today, Thank You
- Brian Hayes (civil servant) (1929–2022), English civil servant
- Brian Hayes (dual player) (born 2001), Irish Gaelic footballer and hurler
- Brian Hayes (lawyer) (born 1944), South Australian lawyer
- Brian Hayes (politician) (born 1969), Irish Fine Gael politician
- Brian Hayes (producer), Australian film producer, co-producer of the 2023 film Emotion Is Dead
- Brian Hayes (rugby union) (born 1990), Irish rugby union player
- Brian Hayes (scientist) (born 1949), American scientist, columnist and author
- Brian Hayes (jockey), see 2025 Grand National

== See also ==
- Bryan Hayes (born 1958), Canadian Member of Parliament
- Bryan Hayes (radio host) (born 1983), Canadian sports radio host
