= Galway senior hurling team season 2017 =

Sports season in County Galway, Ireland

Galway Senior Hurling Season 2017
2017 Hurling Season
Manager	Micheál Donoghue
Captain	David Burke
All-Ireland SHC	Winners
Leinster SHC	Winners
2017 Allianz Senior Hurling League	Winners
Top scorer Championship	Joe Canning 0-46
Highest SHC attendance	15 (v sylane 3 September)

The 2017 season was Micheál Donoghue's second year as manager of the Galway senior hurling team.

On 3 September 2017, Galway beat Waterford in the All-Ireland Final where they won their first title since 1988.

During the championship, Galway only scored two goals, both of which came in the first game against Dublin.

== 2017 senior hurling management team ==
- Manager: Micheál Donoghue (Clarinbridge)
- Selectors: Francis Forde (Turloughmore), Noel Larkin (Meelick-Eyrecourt)

== 2017 squad ==
No.	Player	Position	Club
1	Colm Callanan	Goalkeeper	Kinvara
2	Adrian Tuohy	Right Corner Back	Beagh
3	Daithí Burke	Full back	Turloughmore
4	John Hanbury	Left Corner Back	Rahoon-Newcastle
5	Pádraic Mannion	Right half back	Ahascragh-Fohenagh
6	Gearóid McInerney	Centre back	Oranmore-Maree
7	Aidan Harte	Left half back	Gort
8	Johnny Coen	Midfield	Loughrea
9	David Burke (c)	Midfield	St Thomas'
10	Cathal Mannion	Right half forward	Ahascragh-Fohenagh
11	Joe Canning	Centre forward	Portumna
12	Joseph Cooney	Left half forward	Sarsfields
13	Conor Whelan	Right corner forward	Kinvara
14	Niall Burke	Full forward	Oranmore-Maree
15	Conor Cooney	Left corner forward	St Thomas'

No.	Player	Position	Club
16	James Skehill	Substitute	Cappataggle
17	Ronan Burke	Substitute	Turloughmore
18	Seán Loftus	Substitute	Turloughmore
17	Matt Donohoe	Substitute	Moycullen
20	Greg Lally	Substitute	Gort
21	Éanna Burke	Substitute	St Thomas'
22	Jason Flynn	Substitute	Tommy Larkin's
23	Thomas Monaghan	Substitute	Craughwell
24	Shane Moloney	Substitute	Tynagh-Abbey/Duniry
25	Davy Glennon	Substitute	Mullagh
26	Jonathan Glynn	Substitute	Ardrahan

Squad as per Galway v Tipperary, 2017 All-Ireland Senior Hurling Championship Semi-Final, 6 August 2017

== 2017 Walsh Cup ==
8 January 2017; 14:00; Round 1	Galway	1-30 – 0-12	Dublin Institute of Technology	Duggan Park, Ballinasloe; Referee: A Devine (Westmeath)
8 January 2017; 14:00; Round 1	J Flynn 0-7 (0-4 frees); J Cooney (1-2); T Monaghan, D Glennon (0-4); B Molloy, D Nevin (0-3); P Brehony (0-2); J Grealish, S McInerney, E Niland, C Salmon, J Coen (0-1)	Report	C O’Donoghue (0-6, 0-5 frees); D McNicholas (0-2, 0-1 free); R Greville, A Nugent, C Hayes (0-1); E O’Hehir (0-1 free)	Duggan Park, Ballinasloe; Referee: A Devine (Westmeath)

12 January 2017; 19:30; Round 2	Galway	1-20 – 0-13	National University of Ireland, Galway	Duggan Park, Ballinasloe; Referee: Michael Murtagh (Westmeath)
12 January 2017; 19:30; Round 2	Dan Nevin (0-9, 0-6 frees); Sean McInerney (1-3); Davey Glennon (0-3); Sean Loftus, Jason Flynn, Thomas Monaghan, Evan Niland, Jack Coyne (0-1)	Report	Ger Hennelly (0-5, 0-4 frees); Conor Cleary (0-3 frees); Ian Fox (0-2); Aiden Helebert, Gearoid Loughnane, Conor Ryan (0-1)	Duggan Park, Ballinasloe; Referee: Michael Murtagh (Westmeath)

22 January 2017; 14:00; Round 3	Galway	1-19 – 0-16	Laois	Rathdowney; Referee: S Cleere (Kilkenny)
22 January 2017; 14:00; Round 3	D Nevin (0-13, 0-10 frees, 0-1 '65); J Cooney (1-2); J Flynn, S McInerney (0-2)	Report	B Conroy (0-6, 0-4 frees, 0-1 '65); N Foyle (0-6, 0-5 frees); R Mullaney, W Dunphy, A Corby, R King (0-1)	Rathdowney; Referee: S Cleere (Kilkenny)

28 January 2017; 14:00; Semi-final	Galway	4-37 – 0-15	I.T. Carlow	Pearse Stadium, Salthill; Referee: A Devine (Westmeath)
28 January 2017; 14:00; Semi-final	S Moloney (0-9, 0-2 frees, 0-1 '65); J Flynn (1-6, 0-4 frees); S McInerney (2-3); C Whelan (1-1); A Helebert (0-4); J Cooney, A Tuohy (0-3); D Nevin (0-2, 0-1 free); C Salmon, T Monaghan, Greg Lally, S Loftus, K McHugo, D Glennon (0-1)	Report	M O’Hanlon (0-8, 0-6 frees); C Bolger (0-2); E Rowland (0-2 frees); D Tobin, S Casey, S Phelan (0-1)	Pearse Stadium, Salthill; Referee: A Devine (Westmeath)

5 February 2017; Final	Kilkenny	0-20 – 0-18	Galway	Nowlan Park, Kilkenny; Referee: P. Murphy (Carlow)
5 February 2017; Final	Richie Hogan (0-11, 0-7 frees, 0-2 '65s); Ollie Walsh (0-3); Lester Ryan (0-2); Conor Martin, Pat Lyng, Conor Fogarty, Kieran Joyce (0-1)	Report	Jason Flynn (0-6, 0-5 frees); Joseph Cooney, Davy Glennon (0-2); Shane Maloney (0-2, 0-1 free); Johnny Coen, Aidan Harte, Colm Callanan, Sean McInerney (0-1)	Nowlan Park, Kilkenny; Referee: P. Murphy (Carlow)

== 2017 National Hurling League ==
12 February 2017; 13:00; Round 1	Offaly	1-12 - 6-23	Galway	O'Connor Park, Tullamore; Referee: C Lyons (Cork)
12 February 2017; 13:00; Round 1	S Dooley (0-08, 0-08f), S Cleary (1-01), C Kiely (0-02), S Ryan (0-01).	Report	J Flynn (2-10, 0-08f), C Whelan (2-00), C Cooney (0-06, 0-01f), D Burke (1-01), B Molloy (1-00), J Cooney (0-03), J Coen (0-01), N Burke (0-01), A Tuohy (0-01).	O'Connor Park, Tullamore; Referee: C Lyons (Cork)

19 February 2017; 14:00; Round 2	Galway	3-13 - 1-21	Wexford	Pearse Stadium, Salthill; Attendance: 7, 006; Referee: C McAllister (Cork)
19 February 2017; 14:00; Round 2	J Flynn 0-5 (0-2f, 0-1 ’65), J Cooney 1-1, J Canning 1-0 (1-0 pen), J Coen 1-0, C Cooney 0-3, C Callanan 0-1 (0-1f), B Molloy 0-1, David Burke 0-1, C Whelan 0-1	Report	C McDonald 0-7 (0-5f), M Fanning 1-0 (1-0 pen), L Chin 0-3 (0-2f), P Morris 0-3, A Nolan 0-2, S Donohoe 0-1, D Redmond 0-1, M O’Hanlon 0-1, B Carton 0-1, D O’Keefe 0-1, P Doran 0-1.	Pearse Stadium, Salthill; Attendance: 7, 006; Referee: C McAllister (Cork)

5 March 2017; 14:00; Round 3	Galway	3-31 - 1-11	Laois	Pearse Stadium, Salthill; Referee: P O'Dwyer (Carlow)
5 March 2017; 14:00; Round 3	C Mannion 1-5, J Flynn 0-6 (0-4f, 0-1 65), J Canning 1-2 (1-0 pen), P Flaherty 0-5, C Whelan 1-0, C Cooney 0-3, T Monaghan 0-3, J Cooney 0-1, David Burke 0-1, P Mannion 0-1, P Killeen 0-1, A Harte 0-1, Daithi Burke 0-1, J Coen 0-1.	Report	R King 0-6 (0-3f, 0-1 65), S Bergin 1-0, A Corby 0-1, P Purcell 0-1, C Taylor 0-1, B Conroy 0-1, A Dunphy 0-1.	Pearse Stadium, Salthill; Referee: P O'Dwyer (Carlow)

12 March 2017; 14:00; Round 4	Kerry	0-12 - 1-22	Galway	Austin Stack Park, Tralee; Referee: C Lyons (Cork)
12 March 2017; 14:00; Round 4	S Nolan (0-06f), J Conway (0-02), P Boyle (0-01), C Harty (0-01), B O'Leary (0-01), K Carmody (0-01).	Report	J Canning (0-09, 6f), C Mannion (0-05), P Brehony (1-00), N Burke (0-02), P Flaherty (0-02), S Maloney (0-01), G McInerney (0-01), C Whelan (0-01), D Burke (0-01).	Austin Stack Park, Tralee; Referee: C Lyons (Cork)

26 March 2017; 15:00; Round 5	Limerick	1-18 - 0-24	Galway	Gaelic Grounds, Limerick; Referee: J McGrath (Westmeath)
26 March 2017; 15:00; Round 5	S Dowling 0-11 (8fs), C Lynch 1-1, G Mulcahy 0-2, S Hickey 0-1, D Dempsey 0-1, K Hayes 0-1, G Hegarty 0-1.	Report	J Canning 0-10 (6fs, 1’sl), D Burke 0-6, C Mannion 0-2, P Flaherty 0-1, J Coen 0-1, A Harte 0-1, S Maloney 0-1, T Monaghan 0-1, N Burke 0-1.	Gaelic Grounds, Limerick; Referee: J McGrath (Westmeath)

2 April 2017; 16:00; Quarter-final	Galway	2-22 – 2-19	Waterford	Pearse Stadium, Salthill; Attendance: 12,082; Referee: B Kelly (Westmeath)
2 April 2017; 16:00; Quarter-final	J Canning (1-10, 1-0 pen,0-4 frees, 1 sideline); C Cooney (1-0); C Whelan (0-3); N Burke, A Harte, D Burke (0-2 each); C Mannion, T Monaghan, P Mannion (0-1 each).	Report	T Devine (2-1); M Shanahan (0-6 4 frees); S Roche (0-3); K Moran, T Ryan, DJ Foran (0-2 each); Stephen Bennett, M O’Brien, S Keating (0-1 each).	Pearse Stadium, Salthill; Attendance: 12,082; Referee: B Kelly (Westmeath)

16 April 2017; 2:00 pm Semi-final	Limerick	1-11 – 1-21	Galway	Gaelic Grounds, Limerick; Referee: P O'Dwyer (Carlow)
16 April 2017; 2:00 pm Semi-final	S Dowling (0-5, 0-4 frees); W O’Donoghue (1-0); B Nash (0-2); D Byrnes, D Dempsey, C Lynch, J Fitzgibbon (0-1 each).	Report	C Cooney (1-4); J Canning (0-7, 0-6 frees); C Mannion (0-4); C Whelan (0-2); J Coen, P Mannion, D Burke, T Monaghan (0-1 each).	Gaelic Grounds, Limerick; Referee: P O'Dwyer (Carlow)

23 April 2017; 15:30; Final	Tipperary	0-14 - 3-21	Galway	Gaelic Grounds, Limerick; Attendance: 16,089; Referee: C Lyons (Cork)
23 April 2017; 15:30; Final	J McGrath (0-06, 0-05f), M Breen (0-02), N McGrath (0-02), R Maher (0-02, 0-02f), J O’Dwyer (0-01, 0-1f), B Maher (0-01).	Report	J Canning (0-09, 0-03f, 0-02 65), J Flynn (2-01), C Whelan (0-05), C Mannion (1-01), A Harte (0-02); J Coen (0-01), T Monaghan (0-01), David Burke (0-01).	Gaelic Grounds, Limerick; Attendance: 16,089; Referee: C Lyons (Cork)

== 2017 Leinster Senior Hurling Championship ==
28 May 2017
16:00
Quarter Final

Galway	2-28 – 1-17	Dublin
J Canning 0-9 (0-5f), C Cooney 1-3, C Whelan 0-5, J Flynn 1-2, D Burke 0-3, N Burke 0-2, J Cooney, C Mannion, T Monaghan, É Burke 0-1 each.	Report	D Treacy 0-5 (0-4f), B Quinn 1-0, D Burke 0-3 (0-2f), C Crummey, É Dillon, J Hetherton (0-1f) 0-2 each, S Barrett, R McBride, F Whitely 0-1 each.

O'Connor Park, Tullamore
Attendance: 14,291
Referee: B Kelly (Westmeath)
18 June 2017
14:00
Semi-Final

Offaly	1-11 – 0-33	Galway
S Dooley 0-9 (0-6f, 0-1 65), O Kelly 1-0, E Nolan 0-1, L Langton 0-1.	Report	J Canning 0-7 (0-6f), C Whelan 0-7, N Burke 0-5, S Maloney 0-4, A Harte 0-3, P Mannion 0-2, C Mannion 0-2, J Coen 0-2, C Cooney 0-1.

O'Moore Park, Portlaoise
Attendance: 6,292
Referee: J Ryan (Tipperary)
2 July 2017
16:00
Final

Wexford	1-17 – 0-29	Galway
D O’Keeffe 1-1, C McDonald 0-6 (0-3f), L Chin 0-4 (0-2f, 0-1 65), P Morris and M O’Hanlon 0-2 each, W Devereux, J O’Connor and C Dunbar 0-1 each.	Report	J Canning 0-10 (0-8f, 0-1 65, 0-1 sideline), C Cooney 0-8 (0-1f), J Cooney 0-5, N Burke 0-2, D Burke, P Mannion, T Monaghan and S Maloney 0-1 each.

Croke Park, Dublin
Attendance: 60,032
Referee: C Lyons (Cork)

== 2017 All-Ireland Senior Hurling Championship ==
6 August 2017
16:00
Semi Final

Galway	0-22 – 1-18	Tipperary
J Canning 0-11 (0-6f, 0-1 '65, 0-1 sideline), C Whelan 0-4, C Cooney and J Coen 0-2 each, J Cooney, P Mannion (0-1f), D Burke 0-1 each.	Report	S Callanan 0-5 (0-3f), J McGrath 1-1, J O’Dwyer and B Maher (0-2f) 0-3 each, N McGrath and P Maher 0-2 each, J Forde and S Kennedy 0-1 each.

Croke Park, Dublin
Attendance: 68,184
Referee: B Kelly (Westmeath)
3 September 2017
15:30
Final

Galway	0-26 - 2-17	Waterford
Joe Canning 0-9 (0-6f, 0-1 sideline), David Burke 0-4, Conor Cooney 0-3, Cathal Mannion, Joseph Cooney, Niall Burke, Jason Flynn 0-2 each, Johnny Coen, Conor Whelan 0-1 each.	Report	Pauric Mahony 0-11 (0-8f), Kevin Moran 1-1, Kieran Bennett 1-0, Jamie Barron 0-2, Michael Walsh, Tommy Ryan, Brian O’Halloran 0-1 each.

Croke Park, Dublin
Attendance: 82, 300
Referee: Fergal Horgan (Tipperary)

== Awards ==
On 2 November, the 2017 PwC All-Stars winners were announced with Galway picking up seven awards.

- Padraic Mannion (Galway)
- Daithí Burke (Galway)
- Gearóid McInerney (Galway)
- David Burke (Galway)
- Joe Canning (Galway)
- Conor Whelan (Galway)
- Conor Cooney (Galway)

On 3 November 2017 at the presentation of the All-Star awards, Joe Canning was named as the All Stars Hurler of the Year with Conor Whelan named the All Stars Young Hurler of the Year.
