= 2017 All-Ireland Senior Hurling Championship final =

- Event: 2017 All-Ireland Senior Hurling Championship
Galway	Waterford
0–26	2–17
- Date: 3 September 2017
- Venue: Croke Park, Dublin
- Man of the Match: David Burke
- Referee: Fergal Horgan (Tipperary)
- Attendance: 82,300
- Weather: 17 °C, partly sunny

The 2017 All-Ireland Senior Hurling Championship final was a hurling match played at Croke Park in Dublin on 3 September 2017 between Galway and Waterford, the culmination of the 2017 All-Ireland Senior Hurling Championship. It was the 130th final of that sport's primary competition, the All-Ireland Senior Hurling Championship.

Galway won their fifth All-Ireland All-Ireland SHC title, winning by three points, it was their first title since 1988.

The final was shown live in Ireland on RTÉ2 as part of The Sunday Game live programme, presented by Michael Lyster from Croke Park, with studio analysis from Liam Sheedy, Henry Shefflin and Ger Loughnane. Match commentary was provided by Marty Morrissey with analysis by Michael Duignan. The game was also shown live on Sky Sports, presented by Rachel Wyse and Brian Carney.

The match drew a peak audience of 1.1 million which made it the most watched RTÉ broadcast of 2017 up to then before being overtaken by the football final, it had an average audience of 901,500.

== Background ==
The match-up was unusual for several reasons:

- The first meeting of Galway and Waterford in the All-Ireland Hurling Final.
- The first final since 1996 not to involve one of the "Big Three" counties (Cork, Kilkenny and Tipperary).
- Galway had not won the All-Ireland since 1988 (29 years) and had lost six finals in the interim, 1990, 1993, 2001, 2005, 2012, and 2015.
- Waterford had not won the All-Ireland since 1959 (58 years) and had only appeared in two finals in the interim (1963 and 2008).

The match was the 11th championship meeting between Galway and Waterford, the first in 1938 with the most recent in 2011. Galway had never beaten Waterford in the championship.

Galway were looking to win their fifth All-Ireland title after winning in 1923, 1980, 1987, and 1988. Waterford were looking for a third title after winning in 1948 and 1959.

== Paths to the final ==
=== Galway ===
28 May 2017
16:00
Leinster Quarter-Final

Galway	2-28 – 1-17	Dublin
J Canning 0-9 (0-5f), C Cooney 1-3, C Whelan 0-5, J Flynn 1-2, D Burke 0-3, N Burke 0-2, J Cooney, C Mannion, T Monaghan, É Burke 0-1 each.	Report	D Treacy 0-5 (0-4f), B Quinn 1-0, D Burke 0-3 (0-2f), C Crummey, É Dillon, J Hetherton (0-1f) 0-2 each, S Barrett, R McBride, F Whitely 0-1 each.

O'Connor Park, Tullamore
Attendance: 14,291
Referee: B Kelly (Westmeath)
18 June 2017
14:00
Leinster Semi-Final

Galway	0-33 – 1-11	Offaly
J Canning 0-7 (0-6f), C Whelan 0-7, N Burke 0-5, S Maloney 0-4, A Harte 0-3, P Mannion 0-2, C Mannion 0-2, J Coen 0-2, C Cooney 0-1.	Report	S Dooley 0-9 (0-6f, 0-1 65), O Kelly 1-0, E Nolan 0-1, L Langton 0-1.

O'Moore Park, Portlaoise
Attendance: 6,292
Referee: J Ryan (Tipperary)
2 July 2017
16:00
Leinster Final

Galway	0-29 – 1-17	Wexford
J Canning 0-10 (0-8f, 0-1 65, 0-1 sideline), C Cooney 0-8 (0-1f), J Cooney 0-5, N Burke 0-2, D Burke, P Mannion, T Monaghan and S Maloney 0-1 each.	Report	D O’Keeffe 1-1, C McDonald 0-6 (0-3f), L Chin 0-4 (0-2f, 0-1 65), P Morris and M O’Hanlon 0-2 each, W Devereux, J O’Connor and C Dunbar 0-1 each.

Croke Park, Dublin
Attendance: 60,032
Referee: C Lyons (Cork)
6 August 2017
16:00
All-Ireland Semi-Final

Galway	0-22 – 1-18	Tipperary
J Canning 0-11 (0-6f, 0-1 '65, 0-1 sideline), C Whelan 0-4, C Cooney and J Coen 0-2 each, J Cooney, P Mannion (0-1f), C Mannion 0-1 each.	Report	S Callanan 0-5 (0-3f), J McGrath 1-1, J O’Dwyer and B Maher (0-2f) 0-3 each, N McGrath and P Maher 0-2 each, J Forde and S Kennedy 0-1 each.

Croke Park, Dublin
Attendance: 68,184
Referee: B Kelly (Westmeath)

=== Waterford ===
18 June 2017
16:00
Munster Semi-Final

Cork	0-23 – 1-15	Waterford
P Horgan 0-10 (0-7f, 0-1 ’65), C Lehane 0-4, S Harnedy 0-2, M Ellis, M Coleman (0-1 sideline), B Cooper, D Fitzgibbon, A Cadogan, M Cahalane, L O’Farrell 0-1 each.	Report	Pauric Mahony 0-5 (0-1f), M Shanahan 1-1 (0-1f), S Bennett, A Gleeson, J Barron 0-2 each, B O’Halloran, S Bennett, K Moran 0-1 each.

Semple Stadium, Thurles
Attendance: 33,163
Referee: B Kelly (Westmeath)
1 July 2017
15:00
Qualifier Round 1

Waterford	1-35 – 0-14	Offaly
Pauric Mahony (0-11, 0-7 frees, 0-1 ’65); A Gleeson (0-6); P Curran (0-4, 0-2 frees, 0-1 ’65); Shane Bennett (1-0); K Moran, D Fives, J Barron, M Shanahan, C Dunford (0-2 each); J Dillon, T De Burca, T Ryan, M Walsh (0-1 each).	Report	S Dooley (0-5, 0-5); J Bergin (0-3, 0-2 frees); S Kinsella, B Conneely, E Nolan, O Kelly, J Mulrooney, P Guinan (0-1 each).

Bord na Móna O'Connor Park, Tullamore
Attendance: 4,159
Referee: A Kelly (Galway)
8 July 2017
19:00
Qualifier Round 2

Waterford	4-23 – 2-22 (AET)	Kilkenny
Pauric Mahony 0-6 (0-5f, 0-1 ’65), J Barron, M Shanahan (0-3f) 1-3 each, A Gleeson 0-5, Shane Bennett, M Walsh 1-0 each, T Ryan, K Moran 0-2 each, J Dillon, P Curran 0-1 each.	Report	TJ Reid 2-12 (0-10f, 0-1 ’65, 1-0 pen), L Ryan 0-3, R Leahy 0-2, R Hogan, E Murphy (0-1f), C Fennelly, G Aylward, K Kelly 0-1 each.

Semple Stadium, Thurles
Attendance: 33,181
Referee: J Owens (Wexford)
23 July 2017
16:00
All-Ireland Quarter-Final

Waterford	1-23 – 1-19	Wexford
P Mahony 0-10 (10f), K Moran 1-02, A Gleeson 0-3, B O’Halloran, M Shanahan 0-2 each, M Walsh, C Gleeson, J Dillon, D Fives 0-1 each	Report	J Guiney 0-6 (6f), J O’Connor 1-2, L Chinn 0-3, (2f), R O’Connor, D O’Keeffe 0-2 each, C McDonald, P Morris, E Moore, L Ryan 0-1 each

Páirc Uí Chaoimh, Cork
Attendance: 31,753
Referee: F Horgan (Tipperary)
13 August 2017
15:30
All-Ireland Semi-Final

Waterford	4-19 – 0-20	Cork
Pauric Mahony 0-8 (5f), J Barron 2-1; K Moran 0-4; A Gleeson 1-1, M Walsh 1-0; D Fives, C Gleeson, B O’Halloran, M Shanahan 0-1	Report	P Horgan 0-12 (7f); A Cadogan, C Lehane 0-2; S Kingston, D Fitzgibbon (sideline), S Harnedy, L O’Farrell 0-1

Croke Park, Dublin
Attendance: 72,022
Referee: J Owens (Wexford)

== Pre-match ==
=== Jubilee team ===
The Kilkenny team that won the 1992 All-Ireland Final were presented to the crowd before the match to mark 25 years.

=== Ticketing ===
With a stadium capacity of 82,300, the 32 individual county boards received 60,000 tickets. Schools and third level colleges got 2,500 tickets, while season ticket holders were entitled to 5,500 tickets. 1,000 tickets were given to overseas clubs. The Camogie, Ladies' Football, Handball and Rounders Associations were each allocated about 200 tickets, as were the jubilee teams and mini-7s which play at half-time. Demand for tickets was very high in both counties with Galway and Waterford having receiving around 32,000 tickets between. Stand tickets were priced at €80 with terrace at €40.

=== Related events ===
The 2017 All-Ireland Minor Hurling Final was played between Galway and Cork as a curtain-raiser to the senior final, with Galway winning by 2-17 to 2-15.

== Match summary ==
=== Officials ===
On 17 August 2017 the officials were chosen for the final by the GAA, with Tipperary's Fergal Horgan being named as the referee in what will be his first senior final. Cork’s Colm Lyons was named as linesman and standby referee with Paud O’Dwyer of Carlow on the other line. The sideline official were Johnny Murphy from Limerick. The umpires were John Ryan, Paul Ryan, Mick Butler, and Sean Bradshaw.

=== Team news ===
During Galway's win in the semi-final, Adrian Tuohy was involved in an incident where the helmet of Tipperary player Bonner Maher was pulled off. It was confirmed a few days later that he would face no sanction arising from the incident and would be free to play in the final.

During the semi-final win against Cork, Waterford's Austin Gleeson in a similar incident to Adrian Tuohy's pulled Luke Meade’s helmet off his head in the first half. It was confirmed on 15 August that he would also escape punishment from the CCCC for the incident and would be free to play in the final. It was confirmed on 22 August that Waterford's Conor Gleeson would miss the final after being handed a one-match ban after receiving a straight red card in the semi-final win against Cork.

Jonathan Glynn was named in the starting line-up for Galway for the first time in two years, replacing Niall Burke in the half-forward line. Tadhg de Búrca returned to the Waterford line-up after being suspended for the semi-final, replacing the banned Conor Gleeson.

=== Summary ===
Galway thundered into Waterford from the beginning, giving na Déise very little room to breathe. Playing into the Davin end, Joe Canning opened the scoring for Galway after 18 seconds with a point from out on the left which he hit over his left shoulder. Further points from Johnny Coen, Joseph Cooney, and Cathal Mannion gave Galway a four points to no score lead after four minutes. In the fifth minute, Kevin Moran scored Waterford's first score, a goal when he ran in on goal after collecting a pass from Michael Walsh to finish low to the left of the net. Kevin Moran got a point in the 11th minute to make the score 0-6 to 1-2. David Burke got his second point in the 21st minute to make it 0-10 to 1-4. In the 22nd minute, a high ball in from Kieran Bennett went all the way into the net after a mistake by Galway goalkeeper Colm Callanan when he tried to catch the ball after it bounced, this made the score 0-10 to 2-4. Galway had a one-point lead at half-time on a 0-14 to 2-7 scoreline.

In the second-half Pauric Mahony got the first point from a free to level the match after three minutes. Waterford had a one-point lead in the 43rd minute after another free from Mahony. Joe Canning leveled the match a minute later from a free. After fifty minutes, Galway had a two point lead on a 0-20 to 2-12 scoreline, and with ten minutes to play the Galway lead was one point. With five minutes to go, the lead was four for Galway after a point from Jason Flynn. Canning got Galway's last point in the last minute from another free to make it 0-26 to 2-16, with the final score of the match coming from another Mahony free in the first minute of the four minutes which were added on. Despite attempts by Waterford to score a goal and level the match, Galway held on to win by three points, 0-26 to 2-17.

== Match details ==
3 September 2017
15:30
Final

Galway	0-26 – 2-17	Waterford
J Canning 0-9 (6f, 1 sideline); D Burke 0-4; C Cooney 0-3; N Burke, C Mannion, J Cooney J Flynn 0-2 each; J Coen, C Whelan 0-1 each	Report	Pauric Mahony 0-11 (8f); K Moran 1-1; K Bennett 1-0; J Barron 0-2; M Walsh, B O'Halloran, T Ryan 0-1 each

Croke Park, Dublin
Attendance: 82,300
Referee: Fergal Horgan (Tipperary)

Galway	Waterford

GALWAY:
1	Colm Callanan
2	Adrian Tuohy
3	Daithí Burke
4	John Hanbury
5	Pádraic Mannion
6	Gearóid McInerney
7	Aidan Harte
8	Johnny Coen
9	David Burke (captain)
10	Joseph Cooney
11	Joe Canning
12	Jonathan Glynn
13	Conor Whelan
14	Conor Cooney
15	Cathal Mannion
Substitutes:
20	Niall Burke for J. Glynn (42 mins)
22	Jason Flynn for C. Mannion (54 mins)
24	Shane Moloney for David Burke (68 mins)
Manager:
Micheál Donoghue

WATERFORD:
1	Stephen O'Keeffe
2	Shane Fives
3	Barry Coughlan
4	Noel Connors
5	Tadhg de Búrca
6	Austin Gleeson
7	Philip Mahony
8	Jamie Barron
9	Darragh Lyons
10	Kevin Moran (captain)
11	Pauric Mahony
12	Jake Dillon
13	Shane Bennett
14	Michael Walsh
15	Darragh Fives
Substitutes:
21	Maurice Shanahan for S. Bennett (22 mins)
25	Brian O'Halloran for J. Dillion (48 mins)
19	Thomas Ryan for M. Walsh (55 mins)
23	Colin Dunford for J. Barron (64 mins)
22	Patrick Curran for K. Bennett (64 mins)
Manager:
Derek McGrath

=== Trophy presentation ===
Galway captain David Burke accepted the Liam MacCarthy Cup from GAA president Aogán Ó Fearghail in the Hogan Stand. During his speech Burke paid tribute to the late Tony Keady and Niall Donoghue. The Galway team then did a victory lap around Croke Park with the trophy.

=== Reaction ===
Highlights of the final were shown on The Sunday Game programme which aired at 9:30pm that night on RTÉ2 and was presented by Des Cahill with match analysis from Brendan Cummins, Eddie Brennan, and Anthony Daly. On the man of the match award shortlist were David Burke, Gearóid McInerney and Jamie Barron, with David Burke winning the award which was presented by GAA president Aogán Ó Fearghail at the City West hotel in Dublin where the post match Galway function was being held.

=== Celebrations ===
The Galway teams returned home on the 4 September were the homecoming event was held at Pearse Stadium, with the team arriving around 7:30pm, a crowd of around 20,000 turned put to greet the team. Before that the team stopped on the way at the Fair Green in Ballinasloe at 3pm where almost 15,000 people turned out.
