= Gearóid McInerney =

Galway hurler

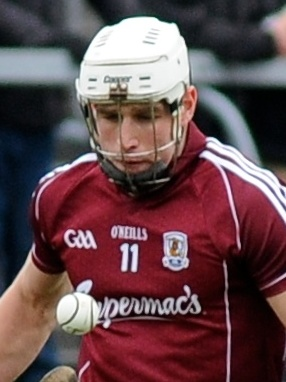

Personal information
- Native name: Gearóid Mac an Airchinnigh (Irish)
- Nickname: Mac
- Born: 24 September 1990 (age 36) Galway, Ireland
- Occupation: Sports Shop
- Height: 1.93 m (6 ft 4 in)

Sport
- Sport: Hurling
- Position: Centre Back
Club
- Years: Club
- 2008–: Oranmore-Maree
Inter-county*
Years	County	Apps (scores)
2014–	Galway	18 (0–0)
Inter-county titles
- Leinster titles: 2
- All-Irelands: 1
- NHL: 2
- All Stars: 1
- *Inter County team apps and scores correct as of 14:35, 7 August 2017.

Gearóid McInerney (born 24 September 1990) is an Irish hurler who plays as a centre-back at senior level for the Galway county team.

Born in Oranmore, County Galway, McInerney was born into a strong hurling family. His father, Gerry McInerney, was a Galway player and won back-to-back All-Ireland medals in 1987 and 1988.

McInerney first played competitive hurling during his schooling at the Oranmore boys national school where he won 2 A county titles in hurling and football. He later played more hurling for Calasanctius College. He simultaneously came to prominence at juvenile and underage levels with the Ornamore-Maree club, before eventually joining the club's top team.

== Career ==
McInerney made his debut on the inter-county scene at the age of twenty when he was selected for the Galway intermediate team. He subsequently joined the Galway under-21 team, winning an All-Ireland medal in 2011. McInerney made his senior debut during the 2014 league and became a regular member of the starting fifteen after a number of seasons. Since then he has won one Leinster medal and one National Hurling League medal. On 3 September 2017, Galway won their first All-Ireland Senior Hurling Championship in 29 years with McInerney started at centre back.

== Career statistics ==
As of match played 5 August 2018.

Team	Year	National League			Leinster		All-Ireland		Total	
Team	Year	Division	Apps	Score	Apps	Score	Apps	Score	Apps	Score
Galway	2014	Division 1A	3	0-03	1	0-00	0	0-00	4	0-03
Galway	2015	Division 1A	6	0-01	2	0-00	0	0-00	8	0-01
Galway	2016	Division 1A	2	0-00	1	0-00	2	0-00	5	0-00
Galway	2017	Division 1B	7	0-01	3	0-00	2	0-00	12	0-01
Galway	2018	Division 1B	5	0-00	6	0-00	1	0-00	12	0-00
Total			23	0-05	13	0-00	5	0-00	41	0-05

== Honours ==
Galway

- All-Ireland Senior Hurling Championship (1): 2017
- Leinster Senior Hurling Championship (1): 2017
- National Hurling League Division 1 (2): 2017, 2021
- All-Ireland Under-21 Hurling Championship (1): 2011

Individual

- The Sunday Game Team of the Year (1): 2017
- The Sunday Game Hurler of the Year (1): 2017
- All-Stars (1): 2017
