= Jonathan Glynn =

Irish hurler

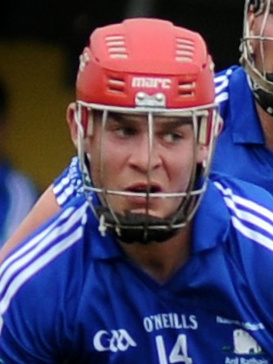

Personal information
- Native name: Seán Mac Gloinn (Irish)
- Born: 7 June 1992 (age 34) Galway, Ireland
- Occupation: Quantity surveyor
- Height: 1.95 m (6 ft 5 in)

Sport
- Sport: Hurling
- Position: Left half forward
Club
- Years: Club
- Ardrahan
College
- Years: College
- University of Limerick
College titles
- Fitzgibbon titles: 0
Inter-county*
Years	County	Apps (scores)
2012–2020, 2024 2016, 2023	Galway; New York	31 (8–8); 1 (0–0)
Inter-county titles
- Leinster titles: 3
- All-Irelands: 1
- NHL: 1
- All Stars: 0
- *Inter County team apps and scores correct as of 18:40, 21 December 2019.

Jonathan Glynn (born 7 June 1992) is an Irish hurler who played as a forward at senior level for the Galway county team.

Glynn made his first appearance for the senior team during the 2012 championship and was part of the Galway panel until his retirement in 2020 at the age of 26. He was a key member of Galway's 2017 All-Ireland winning side.

Also, an All-Ireland medalist in the minor grade, Glynn has won one Leinster medal in the senior grade.

At club level, Glynn played with the Ardrahan club.

== Career ==
Glynn missed all of the 2016 season but returned to the Galway panel in April 2017 after returning from New York City where he played football for New York. He will continue to be based in New York but will return for Galway matches when required.

On 22 April 2017, he came on as a substitute as Galway won the 2017 National Hurling League after a 3–21 to 0–14 win against Tipperary in the final.

On 3 September 2017, Glynn started for Galway as they won their first All-Ireland Senior Hurling Championship in 29 years against Waterford.

On 13 April 2020, he revealed that he and his fiancée had tested COVID-19 positive. Later that month he announced his retirement from inter-county hurling.

In April 2024, it was announced that Glyn had returned to the Galway senior hurling panel for the 2024 championship and would again commute from New York, he had not played for Galway since 2019.

== Career statistics ==
As of match played 15 June 2019.

Team	Year	National League			Leinster		All-Ireland		Total	
Team	Year	Division	Apps	Score	Apps	Score	Apps	Score	Apps	Score
Galway	2012	Division 1A	2	0-01	2	0-00	3	1-00	7	1-01
Galway	2013	Division 1A	6	0-00	1	0-01	1	1-00	8	1-01
Galway	2014	Division 1A	5	1-07	3	1-01	1	2-00	9	4-08
Galway	2015	Division 1A	6	0-03	4	0-01	3	1-02	13	1-06
Galway	2016	Division 1A	—		—		—		—	
Galway	2017	Division 1B	1	0-00	0	0-00	2	0-00	3	0-00
Galway	2018	Division 1B	0	0-00	5	1-01	3	1-01	8	2-02
Galway	2019	Division 1B	0	0-00	3	0-01	—		3	0-01
Total			20	1-11	18	2-05	13	6-03	51	9-19

== Honours ==
Galway

- All-Ireland Senior Hurling Championship (1): 2017
- Leinster Senior Hurling Championship (2): 2012, 2018
- National Hurling League (1): 2017
- All-Ireland Minor Hurling Championship (1): 2011
- Lory Meagher Cup (1): 2025 (c)
