= Niall Burke =

Galway hurler

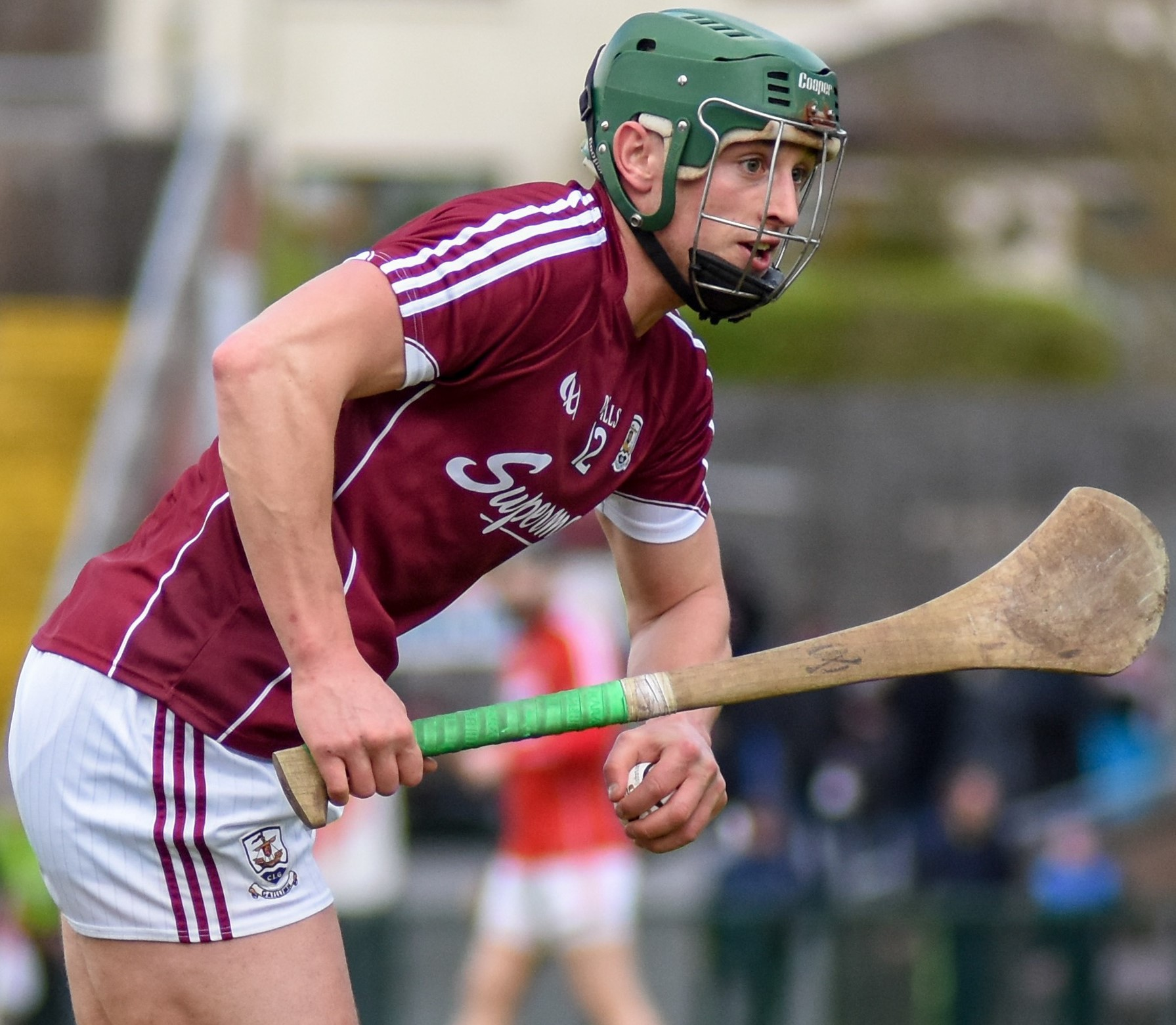

Personal information
- Native name: Níall de Búrca (Irish)
- Born: 21 May 1991 (age 35) Galway, Ireland
- Height: 1.88 m (6 ft 2 in)

Sport
- Sport: Hurling
- Position: Centre forward
Club
- Years: Club
- 2008–: Oranmore-Maree
Inter-county
Years	County	Apps (scores)
2012–2021	Galway	18 (3–64)
Inter-county titles
- Leinster titles: 2
- All-Irelands: 1
- NHL: 2

Niall Burke (born 21 May 1991) is an Irish hurler who, as of 2012, played as a centre-forward at senior level for the Galway county team.

Burke made his first appearance for the team during the 2012 National League and immediately became a regular member of the team. An All-Ireland medalist at minor and under-21 levels, Burke has also won a Leinster medal in the senior grade.

At club level Burke plays with the Oranmore-Maree club. He has also played for NUI Galway.

== Playing career ==
=== Club ===
Burke plays in the Galway Senior Hurling Championship with the Oranmore-Maree club.

=== Inter-county ===
Burke first came to prominence on the inter-county scene as a member of the Galway minor hurling team in 2009. That year he lined out in his first All-Ireland decider, with Kilkenny providing the opposition. A 2–15 to 2–11 score line gave Galway the victory and gave Burke an All-Ireland Minor Hurling Championship medal.

By 2010 Burke had joined the Galway under-21 team and lined out in another All-Ireland final. Tipperary were the opponents on that occasion and, on a day to forget for Burke, handed out a 5–22 to 0–12 thrashing.

Galway's under-21 team qualified for the All-Ireland decider again in 2011. Burke was still a key member of the forwards as Dublin provided the opposition. A 3–14 to 1–10 score line secured the victory for Galway and gave Burke an All-Ireland medal in that grade.

Burke made his debut for the Galway senior team during the 2012 National Hurling League. It was a campaign to forget for 'the Tribesmen', however, Burke emerged as Galway's chief scorer due to the absence of Joe Canning. After making his championship debut later that year, Burke went on to win his first Leinster medal following a 2–21 to 2-11 trouncing of reigning All-Ireland champions and hot favourites Kilkenny. Both sides subsequently met in the All-Ireland decider and Galway nearly pulled off a victory courtesy of goals from Canning and Burke. A 2–13 to 0–19 draw was the result, a first drawn All-Ireland final in over half a century.

On 3 September 2017, Burke came on as a substitute for Galway in the second half and scored two points as they won their first All-Ireland Senior Hurling Championship in 29 years against Waterford.

=== Inter-provincial ===
Burke has also lined out with the Connacht team in the inter-provincial series of games.

== Honours ==
Galway

- All-Ireland Senior Hurling Championship (1): 2017
- National Hurling League Division 1 (2): 2017, 2021
- Leinster Senior Hurling Championship (2): 2012, 2017
