= David Burke (Galway hurler) =

Irish hurler (born 1990)

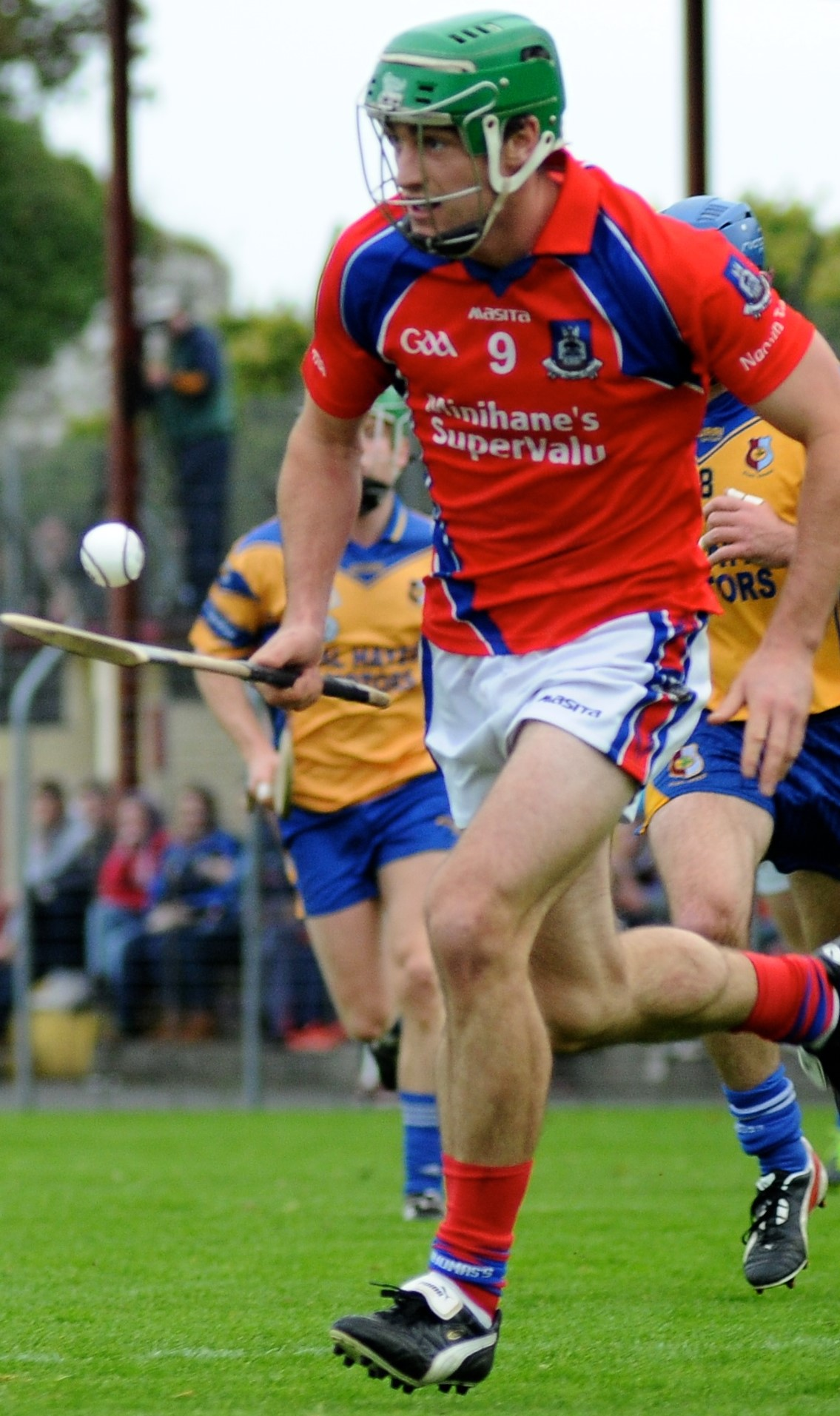
- David Burke in action for St Thomas' in 2013

Personal information
- Native name: Daithí de Búrca (Irish)
- Born: 7 January 1990 (age 36) Ballinasloe, Ireland
- Occupation: Teacher
- Height: 1.83 m (6 ft 0 in)

Sport
- Sport: Hurling
- Position: Midfield
Club
- Years: Club
- 2007–: St Thomas'
Club titles
- Galway titles: 8
- All-Ireland Titles: 2
College
- Years: College
- UL
College titles
- Fitzgibbon titles: 1
Inter-county*
Years	County	Apps (scores)
2009–2025	Galway	63 (8-73)
Inter-county titles
- Leinster titles: 3
- All-Irelands: 1
- NHL: 3
- All Stars: 4
- *Inter County team apps and scores correct as of 18 June 2022.

David Burke (born 7 January 1990) is an Irish hurler who previously played as a midfielder or half forward for the Galway senior team.

Burke joined the team in 2010 and immediately became a regular member of the starting fifteen. He has won one Leinster winners' medal and two National Hurling League winners' medal.

At club level Burke plays with St Thomas'.

== Playing career ==
=== Club ===
Burke plays his club hurling with St Thomas'. His honours include a County Minor A Championship from 2008 and also a County U-21 A Championship from 2011. Burke was captain of the St Thomas' team on both occasions. David Burke also won a County Senior championship in 2012 and an All-Ireland Club championship in 2013. He won another county total in 2016 but lost to Ballyaodh in the All Ireland club semi-finals. In 2018, he won another county total beating Liam Mellows. He went on to the All-Ireland club final only to lose to Ballyhale Shamrocks of Kilkenny. He once again went on to beat Liam Mellows in the 2019 County Hurling final.

=== Inter-county ===
Burke first came to prominence on the inter-county scene as a member of the Galway minor hurling team. In 2008 he lined out in the All-Ireland final; however, Kilkenny accounted for the westerners.

Two years later Burke had joined the Galway under-21 team and lined out in that year's championship decider.

Burke made his senior debut in championship against Wexford.

In 2011, Burke was a member of the victorious Galway All-Ireland Under 21 Championship winning team.

In 2012, Burke was a member of the Galway team which won the Leinster Senior Hurling Championship for an historic first time. He played at right half forward on the Galway team which defeated Kilkenny on a scoreline of 2–21 to 2–11. Galway were defeated in the final by Kilkenny after a replay. In October 2012, as recognition for his season for the county, Burke received his first All Star Award.

In 2015, Burke was a key player at midfield in Galway's run to the All-Ireland Final, where they were defeated by Kilkenny. His form in the championship earned him his second All-Star Award in November 2015. At the beginning of the 2016 season, Burke became captain of the Galway senior hurling team. In November 2016, Burke received his third All-Star award.

On 22 April 2017, Burke captained Galway to win the 2017 National Hurling League after a 3–21 to 0–14 win against Tipperary in the final.

On 3 September 2017, he captained Galway to their first All-Ireland Senior Hurling Championship win for 29 years.

At 32 years of age, Burke became his county's appearance record holder (63) against Cork in the 2022 All-Ireland Senior Hurling Championship quarter-final on 18 June 2022.

In December 2025, Burke announced his retirement form inter-county hurling after 16 years with the team.

== Career statistics ==
As of match played 18 June 2022.

Team	Year	National League			Leinster		All-Ireland		Total	
Team	Year	Division	Apps	Score	Apps	Score	Apps	Score	Apps	Score
Galway	2009	Division 1	0	0-00	0	0-00	0	0-00	0	0-00
Galway	2010	Division 1	8	0-05	3	0-03	1	0-01	12	0-09
Galway	2011	Division 1	7	0-09	2	0-03	3	0-03	12	0-15
Galway	2012	Division 1A	6	1-09	3	4-04	3	2-02	12	7-15
Galway	2013	Division 1A	2	0-02	2	1-02	1	0-01	5	1-05
Galway	2014	Division 1A	7	0-08	3	0-02	1	1-00	11	1-10
Galway	2015	Division 1A	0	0-00	4	0-03	3	0-05	7	0-08
Galway	2016	Division 1A	6	0-07	3	0-05	2	0-03	11	0-15
Galway	2017	Division 1B	8	1-14	3	0-04	2	0-05	13	1-23
Galway	2018	Division 1B	2	0-01	6	0-05	3	0-08	11	0-14
Galway	2019	Division 1B	-		4	0-06	-		4	0-06
Galway	2020	Division 1A	2	0-01	1	0-02	2	0-00	5	0-03
Galway	2021	Division 1A	2	0-02	1	0-00	-		3	0-02
Galway	2022	Division 1A	3	0-00	6	0-04	1	0-02	10	0-06
Total			53	2-55	41	5-43	22	3-30	116	10-128

== Honours ==
=== Club ===
- Galway Senior Hurling Championship (8): 2012, 2016, 2018, 2019, 2020, 2021, 2022, 2023
- All-Ireland Senior Club Hurling Championship (2): 2012-13, 2023-24

=== College ===
- Fitzgibbon Cup (1): 2011

=== County ===
- Walsh Cup (1): 2010
- National Hurling League (3): 2010, 2017 (c), 2021
- Leinster Senior Hurling Championship (3): 2012, 2017 (c), 2018 (c)
- All-Ireland Under-21 Hurling Championship (1): 2011
- All-Ireland Senior Hurling Championship (1): 2017 (c)

=== Awards ===
- All-Stars (4): 2012, 2015, 2016, 2017
- The Sunday Game Team of the Year (3): 2015, 2016, 2017
- All-Ireland Senior Hurling Championship Final Man of the Match (1): 2017

Sporting positions
Preceded by Mark McMahon	Galway minor hurling team captain 2007	Succeeded by Richie Cummins
Preceded by David Collins	Galway senior hurling team captain 2016-2019	Succeeded by Pádraic Mannion
Achievements
Preceded by Brendan Maher	All-Ireland Senior Hurling Final winning captain 2017	Succeeded by Declan Hannon
