= Fergal Horgan =

Irish hurler and referee

Personal information
- Native name: Fearghal Ó hArgáin (Irish)
- Born: 1979 (age 46–47) Dundrum, County Tipperary, Ireland
- Occupation: Postman

Sport
- Sport: Hurling
- Position: Goalkeeper
Clubs
- Years: Club
- Knockavilla–Donaskeigh Kickhams; Brother Pearses; Seán Treacy's
Inter-county
- Years: County
- 1998: Tipperary
Inter-county titles
- Munster titles: 0
- All-Irelands: 0
- NHL: 0
- All Stars: 0

Fergal Horgan (born 1979) is an Irish hurling referee and former player. His inter-county career saw him play for Tipperary and London. He later became one of hurling's top officials and refereed three All Ireland Senior Hurling Finals before retiring from inter-county refereeing in April 2023.

== Career ==
Born in Dundrum, County Tipperary, Horgan first came to prominence as a member of the Knockavilla–Donaskeigh Kickhams club at juvenile and underage levels, winning county under-21 championship A honours as a 15 yr old. He later joined the senior team and enjoyed some divisional success before lining out with the Brother Pearses and Seán Treacy's clubs in London.

Horgan won multiple All-Ireland medals Tony Forristal with Tipperary U14 and 2 All Ireland’s under-16 before making his minor debut at the age of sixteen. His three seasons in this grade culminated with the winning of an All-Ireland MHC medal in 1996 and two Munster MHC medals in 1996 and 1997. Horgan later joined the Tipperary under-21 team, winning a Munster medal 1999. His senior career with Tipperary lasted one season; however, as he emigrated to London for three years. After returning to Ireland, Horgan won a Munster medal with the Tipperary intermediate team in 2002, losing the All-Ireland final in a replay to Galway.

As his playing career came to an end, Horgan began his refereeing career at club juvenile level in 2009. Two years later he was added to the Munster panel of inter-county referees before joining the national panel the following year. Horgan was the inaugural winner of the Shane Hourigan memorial Young Referee of the year 2014. He refereed the 2017 All-Ireland SHC Final.

He previously refereed the 2014 Ulster Senior Final 2014, the 2016,2018 & 2020 Leinster Senior Finals, the 2017 Munster Senior final, the 2014 All-Ireland Minor Hurling Final in 2014, the 2015 All-Ireland Intermediate Hurling Final and the 2017 and 2019 All-Ireland Senior Club Finals.

Horgan refereed the 2020 All-Ireland final which was his second senior final. Horgan took charge of his third senior hurling final in 2021.

In April 2023, Horgan announced his retirement from inter-county refereeing. Horgan is also believed to have left all codes of refereeing.

== Honours ==
Tipperary

- 2 Munster Minor Hurling Championship: 1996, 1997
- 1 All-Ireland Minor Hurling Championship: 1996
- 1 Munster Under-21 Hurling Championship: 1999
- 1 Munster Intermediate Hurling Championship: 2002

Achievements
Preceded by Brian Gavin	All-Ireland Senior Hurling Final referee 2017	Succeeded by James Owens
