= Adrian Tuohey =

Irish hurler

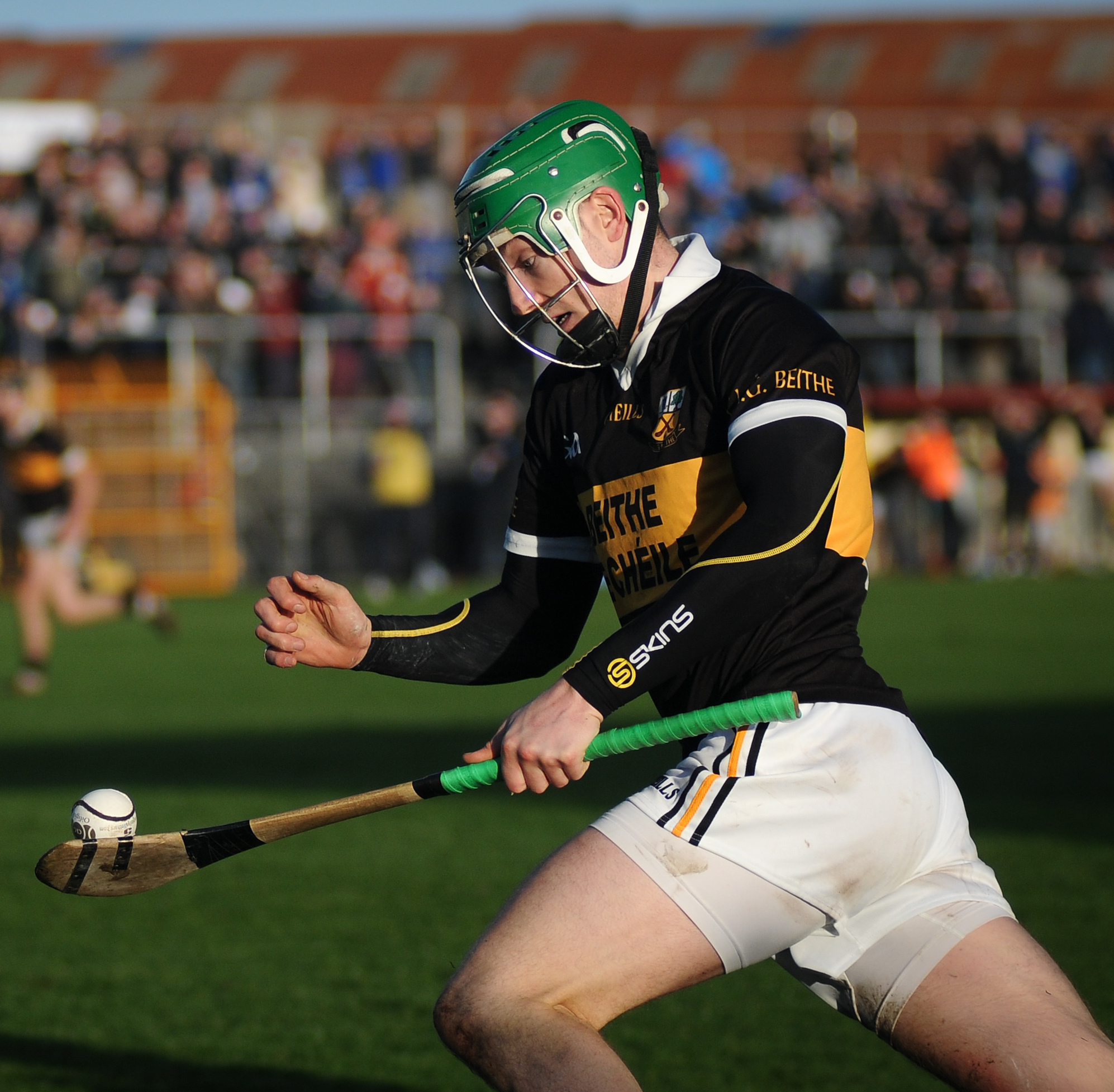
- Tuohey in 2014

Personal information
- Native name: Adrian Ó Tuathaigh (Irish)
- Born: 14 May 1993 (age 33) Shanaglish, County Galway, Ireland
- Height: 6 ft 1 in (185 cm)

Sport
- Sport: Hurling
- Position: Right corner-back
Club
- Years: Club
- 2012–present: Beagh
Club titles
- Galway titles: 0
Inter-county*
Years	County	Apps (scores)
2016–present	Galway	18 (0-02)
Inter-county titles
- Leinster titles: 2
- All-Irelands: 1
- NHL: 2
- All Stars: 0
- *Inter County team apps and scores correct as of 19:53, 8 September 2018.

Adrian Tuohey (born 14 May 1993) is an Irish hurler who plays as a right corner-back for club side Beagh and at inter-county level with the Galway senior hurling team.

== Playing career ==
=== Club ===
Tuohey joined the Beagh club at a young age and played in all grades at juvenile and underage levels before joining the club's top adult team.

=== Inter-county ===
==== Minor and under-21 ====
Tuohey first played for Galway as a member of the minor hurling team on 23 July 2011. He made his first appearance in an 8–26 to 0-12 All-Ireland quarter-final defeat of Antrim at Parnell Park. On 4 September 2011, Tuohey was at right wing-back in Galway's 1–21 to 1–12 defeat of Dublin in the All-Ireland final at Croke Park.

As a member of the Galway under-21 hurling team, Tuohey made his only appearance on 23 August 2014 in a 1–21 to 1-19 All-Ireland semi-final defeat by Wexford.

==== Intermediate ====
On 1 July 2015, Tuohey made his first appearance for the Galway intermediate hurling team. He later won a Leinster Championship medal following Galway's 1–20 to 0–11 defeat of Wexford in the final. On 8 August 2015, Tuoehy won an All-Ireland medal after Galway's 0–23 to 0–14 defeat of Cork in the final.

==== Senior ====
Tuohey made his first appearance for the Galway senior hurling team in a 1–27 to 1-21 National Hurling League defeat of Cork on 14 February 2016. He later made his championship debut on 5 June 2016 in a 3–27 to 0–19 defeat of Westmeath at Cusack Park.

On 23 April 2017, Tuohey was at right corner-back when Galway defeated Tipperary by 3–21 to 0–14 to win the National Hurling League. Later that season he won his first Leinster Championship medal after Galway's 0–29 to 1–17 defeat of Wexford in the final. Following Galway's All-Ireland semi-final defeat of Tipperary, there was speculation that Tuohey would receive some sanction from the CCCC after footage of him pulling the helmet from Tipperary player Patrick Maher’s head was shown on the Sunday Game. The incident wasn’t dealt with by referee Barry Kelly or his officials, however, the CCCC took no subsequent action. On 3 September 2017, Tuohey started for Galway at right corner-back when they won their first All-Ireland in 29 years after a 0-26 to 2-17 defeat of Waterford in the final.

On 8 July 2018, Tuohey won a second successive Leinster Championship medal following Galway's 1-28 to 3-15 defeat of Kilkenny in the final. On 19 August 2018, he lined out at left corner-back in Galway's 3-16 to 2-18 All-Ireland final defeat by Limerick.

== Career statistics ==
As of match played 15 June 2019.

Team	Year	National League			Leinster		All-Ireland		Total	
Team	Year	Division	Apps	Score	Apps	Score	Apps	Score	Apps	Score
Galway	2016	Division 1A	4	0-00	1	0-00	2	0-00	7	0-00
Galway	2017	Division 1B	7	0-01	3	0-00	2	0-00	12	0-01
Galway	2018	Division 1B	6	0-00	5	0-00	3	0-00	14	0-00
Galway	2019	Division 1B	0	0-00	2	0-02	—		2	0-02
Total			17	0-01	11	0-02	7	0-00	35	0-03

== Honours ==
Galway

- All-Ireland Senior Hurling Championship (1): 2017
- Leinster Senior Hurling Championship (2): 2017, 2018
- National Hurling League (2): 2017, 2021
- All-Ireland Intermediate Hurling Championship (1): 2015
- Leinster Intermediate Hurling Championship (1): 2015
- All-Ireland Minor Hurling Championship (1): 2011
