= Kenny Feeney =

Irish hurler

Personal information
- Native name: Cionnaith Ó Fiannaí (Irish)
- Born: 1991 (age 34–35) Tooreen, County Mayo, Ireland

Sport
- Sport: Hurling
- Position: Centre-forward
Club
- Years: Club
- Tooreen
Club titles
- Mayo titles: 5
College
- Years: College
- Galway-Mayo Institute of Technology
Inter-county*
| Years | County | Apps (scores) |
| 2010-present | Mayo | 20 (7-133) |
Inter-county titles
- All-Irelands: 0
- NHL: 0
- All Stars: 0
- *Inter County team apps and scores correct as of 21:58, 6 March 2018.

Kenny Feeney (born 1991) is an Irish hurler who plays as a centre-forward for the Mayo senior team.

Born in Tooreen, County Mayo, Feeney first played competitive hurling with Ballyhaunis Community School. He simultaneously came to prominence at juvenile and underage levels with the Tooreen club. Feeney subsequently enjoyed success with the club's senior team, winning a Connacht medal in 2017. He has also won two county championship medals.

Feeney made his debut on the inter-county scene when he was selected for the Mayo minor team, before joining the under-21 team. He made his senior debut during the 2010 league.

== Career statistics ==
As of match played 25 February 2018.

| Team | Year | National League | | | Rackard Cup | | Ring Cup | | Total | |
| Team | Year | Division | Apps | Score | Apps | Score | Apps | Score | Apps | Score |
|---|---|---|---|---|---|---|---|---|---|---|
| Mayo | 2010 | Division 3A | 4 | 0-01 | 0 | 0-00 | 0 | 0-00 | 4 | 0-01 |
| Mayo | 2011 | Division 3B | 7 | 1-23 | 0 | 0-00 | 2 | 0-01 | 9 | 1-24 |
| Mayo | 2012 | Division 2B | 5 | 2-32 | 0 | 0-00 | 2 | 0-16 | 7 | 2-48 |
| Mayo | 2013 | Division 2B | 5 | 1-40 | 0 | 0-00 | 2 | 3-03 | 7 | 4-43 |
| Mayo | 2014 | Division 2B | 5 | 0-32 | 0 | 0-00 | 4 | 0-37 | 9 | 0-69 |
| Mayo | 2015 | Division 2B | 6 | 1-37 | 0 | 0-00 | 4 | 0-29 | 10 | 1-66 |
| Mayo | 2016 | Division 2B | 5 | 1-40 | 4 | 3-30 | 0 | 0-00 | 9 | 4-70 |
| Mayo | 2017 | Division 2B | 6 | 1-44 | 0 | 0-00 | 2 | 1-17 | 8 | 2-61 |
| Mayo | 2018 | Division 2B | 4 | 1-21 | 0 | 0-00 | 0 | 0-00 | 4 | 1-21 |
| Total | | | 47 | 8-270 | 4 | 3-30 | 16 | 4-103 | 67 | 15-403 |

== Honours ==
Tooreen

- Connacht Intermediate Club Hurling Championship (2): 2017, 2019
- Mayo Senior Hurling Championship (5): 2013, 2017, 2018, 2019, 2021

Mayo

- Nicky Rackard Cup (1): 2016
- Connacht Intermediate Hurling Championship (1): 2014
