= Jason Flynn =

Galway hurler (born 1994)

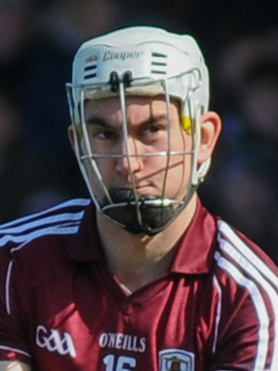
- Flynn in 2015

Personal information
- Native name: Iasón Ó Floinn (Irish)
- Born: 16 November 1994 (age 31) Galway, Ireland
- Height: 1.94 m (6 ft 4 in)

Sport
- Sport: Hurling
- Position: Right corner forward
Club
- Years: Club
- 2011–: Tommy Larkin's
Club titles
- Galway titles: 0
College
- Years: College
- Galway-Mayo Institute of Technology
College titles
- Fitzgibbon titles: 0
Inter-county*
Years	County	Apps (scores)
2014–	Galway	38 (8–74)
Inter-county titles
- Leinster titles: 2
- All-Irelands: 1
- NHL: 2
- All Stars: 0
- *Inter County team apps and scores correct as of 22:49, 2 October 2019.

Jason Flynn (born 16 November 1994) is an Irish hurler who plays as a right corner-forward for club side Tommy Larkin's and at senior level with the Galway county team.

== Playing career ==
=== College ===
Flynn first came to prominence as a hurler with Mercy College in Woodford. Having played in every grade as a hurler, he was subsequently selected for the college's senior hurling team as well as playing for the amalgamated Mercy Colleges team. In 2013, Flynn won a Connacht Championship medal when Mercy Colleges defeated Presentation College from Athenry by 0–14 to 0-09.

=== University ===
As a student at the Galway-Mayo Institute of Technology, Flynn was a regular player on the institute's senior hurling team in the Fitzgibbon Cup.

=== Club ===
Flynn joined the Tommy Larkin's club at a young age and played in all grades at juvenile and underage levels before eventually joining the club's top adult team.

=== Inter-county ===
==== Minor and under-21 ====
Flynn first played for Galway as a member of the minor hurling team on 25 July 2010. He made his first appearance in a 1–15 to 2-08 All-Ireland quarter-final defeat of Waterford at Croke Park.

On 4 September 2011, Flynn scored three points from right wing-forward in Galway's 1–21 to 1–12 defeat of Dublin in the All-Ireland final.

After completing an unsuccessful third season with the Galway minor team, Flynn made his first appearance for the Galway under-21 team on 24 August 2013 in a 1–16 to 0-07 All-Ireland semi-final defeat by Clare.

==== Senior ====
Flynn made his first appearance for the Galway senior hurling team in a 0–28 to 1-12 National Hurling League defeat of Dublin on 16 February 2014. Later that season he made his first championship appearance, replacing Cathal Mannion in the 50th minute of a Leinster Championship defeat of Laois.

On 6 September 2015, Flynn scored four points from right corner-forward in Galway's 1–22 to 1–18 defeat by Kilkenny in the All-Ireland final.

On 23 April 2017, Flynn scored 2-01 from play when Galway defeated Tipperary by 3–21 to 0–14 to win the National Hurling League. Later that season he won his first Leinster Championship medal after Galway's 0–29 to 1–17 defeat of Wexford in the final. On 3 September 2017, Flynn came on as a substitute when Galway won their first All-Ireland in 29 years after a 0–26 to 2–17 defeat of Waterford in the final.

On 8 July 2018, Flynn won a second successive Leinster Championship medal following Galway's 1–28 to 3–15 defeat of Kilkenny in the final replay.

== Career statistics ==
As of match played 24 July 2021.

Team	Year	National League			Leinster		All-Ireland		Total	
Team	Year	Division	Apps	Score	Apps	Score	Apps	Score	Apps	Score
Galway	2014	Division 1A	7	1-04	3	1-06	1	1-00	11	3-10
Galway	2015	Division 1A	6	0-29	3	1-11	3	0-12	12	1-52
Galway	2016	Division 1A	5	0-05	3	1-03	2	0-02	10	1-10
Galway	2017	Division 1B	6	4-22	3	1-02	2	0-02	11	5-26
Galway	2018	Division 1B	4	1-17	6	1-14	3	0-03	13	2-34
Galway	2019	Division 1B	5	1-16	4	0-15	—		9	1-31
Galway	2020	Division 1A	5	1-02	2	0-02	2	0-01	9	1-05
Galway	2021	Division 1A	4	0-02	0	0-00	1	2-01	5	2-03
Total			42	8-97	24	5-53	14	3-21	80	16-171

== Honours ==
Mercy College

- Connacht Colleges Senior Hurling Championship: 2013
- Connacht Colleges Senior B Hurling Championship: 2012

Galway

- All-Ireland Senior Hurling Championship: 2017
- Leinster Senior Hurling Championship: 2017, 2018
- National Hurling League: 2017, 2021
- All-Ireland Minor Hurling Championship: 2011
