= 2017 National Hurling League =

86th season of the National Hurling League

National Hurling League 2017
League details
- Dates: 11 February – 23 April 2017
- Teams: 33

League champions
- Winners: Galway (10th win)
- Captain: David Burke
- Manager: Micheál Donoghue

League runners-up
- Runners-up: Tipperary
- Captain: Pádraic Maher
- Manager: Michael Ryan

Other division winners
- Division 2A: Antrim
- Division 2B: Meath
- Division 3A: Donegal
- Division 3B: Longford

The 2017 National Hurling League was the 86th season of the National Hurling League for county teams.

Clare were the defending champions, winning the title for the first time since 1977–78 after a 1–23 to 2–19 win against Waterford in a replay on 8 May 2016.

Eir Sport (formerly Setanta) and TG4 provide live coverage of the league on Saturday nights and Sunday afternoons respectively, with highlights shown on GAA 2017 during the week. RTÉ2 broadcasts highlights programme Allianz League Sunday on Sunday evenings.

In the Division 1 final on 23 April, Galway won the title after a 3–21 to 0–14 win against Tipperary at the Gaelic Grounds.

== Format ==
League structure

Thirty three teams compete in the 2017 NHL – six teams in the top four divisions (Divisions 1A, 1B, 2A, 2B), four teams in Division 3A and five teams in Division 3B. Thirty-one county teams from Ireland take part (Cavan do not). London and Warwickshire complete the lineup. Fingal were scheduled to compete in Division 3A but have withdrawn for 2017.

Each team plays all the other teams in their division once, either home or away in all divisions except Division 3A where a double round of fixtures are played. Two points are awarded for a win, and one for a draw.

On a pilot basis in 2017, the hurling quarter-finals and semi-finals will finish on the day the games are played avoiding the need for replays. If a quarter-final or semi-final is level after the initial seventy minutes, still level after two ten minute periods of extra time played each way, and still level after two further five minute periods of extra time, the outcome will be decided by a free-taking competition. This will prevent games from going to a replay and allow the league finals to be held on the scheduled date.

Tie-breaker

- If only two teams are level on league points, the team that won the head-to-head match is ranked ahead. If this game was a draw, score difference (total scored minus total conceded in all games) is used to rank the teams.
- If three or more teams are level on league points, score difference is used to rank them.

Finals, promotions and relegations

Division 1A

- The top four teams qualify for the Division 1 quarter-finals
- The bottom two teams meet in a relegation play-off, with the losing team relegated to Division 1B

Division 1B

- The top team is promoted to Division 1A
- The top four teams qualify for the Division 1 quarter-finals
- The bottom two teams meet in a play-off, with the losing team relegated to Division 2A

Division 2A

- The top two teams meet in Division 2A final, with the winning team promoted to Division 1B
- The bottom team is relegated to Division 2B

Division 2B

- The top two teams meet in Division 2B final, with the winning team being promoted to Division 2A
- The bottom two teams meet in a play-off, with the losing team relegated to Division 3A

Division 3A

- The top two teams meet in Division 3A final, with the winning team promoted to Division 2B

Division 3B

- The top two teams meet in Division 3B final, but the winner is not promoted

== Division 1A ==
=== Division 1 Format ===
The 12 teams in Division 1 are ranked into two groups of six teams named Division 1A and Division 1B. Each team play all the other teams in its group once. Two points are awarded for a win and one for a draw. The top four teams in 1A and 1B advance to the league quarter-finals with the top team in Division 1A playing the fourth team in Division 1B, the second team in Division 1A playing the third in Division 1B, etc.

=== Division 1A Table ===
NHL runner-up Relegated team

Team	Pld	W	D	L	F	A	Diff	Pts
Tipperary	5	3	1	1	7-103	4-84	28	7
Cork	5	3	0	2	2-97	7-81	1	6
Waterford	5	3	0	2	6-83	4-95	-6	6
Kilkenny	5	2	1	2	5-85	6-82	0	5
Clare	5	2	0	3	4-93	3-97	-1	4
Dublin (R)	5	1	0	4	6-75	6-97	-22	2

=== Division 1A Rounds 1 to 5 ===
==== Division 1A Round 1 ====
11 February 2017; 17:00; Round 1	Dublin	1-8 - 1-24	Tipperary	Croke Park, Dublin; Attendance: 28,305; Referee: P O'Dwyer (Carlow)
11 February 2017; 17:00; Round 1	E Dillon 1-0, D Burke 0-3 (0-3f), N McMorrow 0-2, O O’Rorke, F McGibb 0-1 each.	Report	S Callanan 0-8 (0-8f), J Forde 1-3, A McCormack 0-5, P Maher 0-2, T Hamill, K Bergin, N McGrath, S Curran, N O’Meara 0-1 each.	Croke Park, Dublin; Attendance: 28,305; Referee: P O'Dwyer (Carlow)

11 February 2017; 19:00; Round 1	Cork	0-21 - 1-11	Clare	Páirc Uí Rinn, Cork; Attendance: 5,752; Referee: J Keenan (Wicklow)
11 February 2017; 19:00; Round 1	P Horgan 0-5 (0-4 frees), S Kingston, A Cadogan 0-4 each, D Kearney, L Meade 0-2 each, S Harnedy, B Cooper, D Fitzgibbon, D Brosnan 0-1 each.	Report	T Kelly 0-6, P Collins 1-1, D Reidy 0-2f, A Shanagher, J Conlon 0-1 each.	Páirc Uí Rinn, Cork; Attendance: 5,752; Referee: J Keenan (Wicklow)

12 February 2017; 14:00; Round 1	Kilkenny	0-17 - 1-15	Waterford	Nowlan Park, Kilkenny; Attendance: 8,793; Referee: F Horgan (Tipperary)
12 February 2017; 14:00; Round 1	TJ Reid (0-10, frees, 0-2 65s); L Blanchfield, P Lyng, O Walsh, R Hogan, W Walsh, E Murphy (free), K Joyce (0-1 each).	Report	P Mahony (0-10, 0-9 frees, 0-1 65); P Curran (1-1); J Barron (0-3); C Gleeson (0-1).	Nowlan Park, Kilkenny; Attendance: 8,793; Referee: F Horgan (Tipperary)

==== Division 1A Round 2 ====
18 February 2017; 19:00; Round 2	Cork	1-14 - 2-19	Dublin	Páirc Uí Rinn, Cork; Attendance: 6,214; Referee: S Cleere (Kilkenny)
18 February 2017; 19:00; Round 2	P Horgan 0-6 (5f), S Kingston 1-2, L Meade, M Coleman (1f, 1 65) 0-2 each, A Cadogan, C Lehane 0-1 each.	Report	D Burke 0-8 (4f, 1 65), E Conroy 1-2, R O’Dwyer 1-1, R McBride 0-2 each, C Crummey, E Dillon, C Bennett, C Conway, C O’Sullivan, F Mac Gib 0-1 each.	Páirc Uí Rinn, Cork; Attendance: 6,214; Referee: S Cleere (Kilkenny)

19 February 2017; 14:00; Round 2	Clare	2-19 - 0-12	Kilkenny	Cusack Park, Ennis; Attendance: 7,395; Referee: J Owens (Wexford)
19 February 2017; 14:00; Round 2	D Reidy (0-7, 5 frees, 1 65), A Shanagher (1-4, 0-1 free), A Cunningham (1-0), P Collins, C McInerney (0-2 each), D Fitzgerald, J Conlon, J McCarthy, P Duggan (65) (0-1 each).	Report	TJ Reid (0-7, 4 frees, 2 65s), C Fogarty (0-2), E Murphy (free), C Buckley, R Leahy (0-1 each).	Cusack Park, Ennis; Attendance: 7,395; Referee: J Owens (Wexford)

19 February 2017; 14:00; Round 2	Waterford	0-15 - 1-18	Tipperary	Walsh Park, Waterford; Attendance: 7,344; Referee: D Kirwan (Cork)
19 February 2017; 14:00; Round 2	P Mahony 0-8 (0-7f), B O’Halloran 0-2, A Gleeson, G O’Brien, M Kearney, T Devine 0-1 each.	Report	J McGrath 1-6 (0-3f), J O’Dwyer 0-5 (0-4f), S O’Brien, J Forde 0-2 each, B Maher, K Bergin, N O’Meara 0-1 each.	Walsh Park, Waterford; Attendance: 7,344; Referee: D Kirwan (Cork)

==== Division 1A Round 3 ====
4 March 2017; 17:00; Round 3	Dublin	1-17 - 2-19	Waterford	Croke Park, Dublin; Attendance: 34,578; Referee: J Ryan (Tipperary)
4 March 2017; 17:00; Round 3	D Burke 1-7 (1-7 frees), E Dillon 0-4, R O’Dwyer, R McBride 0-2 each, C Crummey, N McMorrow 0-1 each.	Report	P Mahony 0-12 (0-10f), S Bennett 2-2, A Gleeson, K Moran 0-2 each, M Shanahan 0-1.	Croke Park, Dublin; Attendance: 34,578; Referee: J Ryan (Tipperary)

5 March 2017; 14:00; Round 3	Kilkenny	0-22 - 0-15	Cork	Nowlan Park, Kilkenny; Attendance: 6,906; Referee: J McGrath (Westmeath)
5 March 2017; 14:00; Round 3	TJ Reid (5 frees, 0-7); R Hogan (0-5); W Walsh, R Leahy (0-3 each); E Murphy (frees, 0-2); C Buckley, C Martin (0-1 each).	Report	C Lehane (4 frees, 2 65s, 0-10); A Cadogan (0-2); S Harnedy, D Brosnan, B Cooper (0-1 each).	Nowlan Park, Kilkenny; Attendance: 6,906; Referee: J McGrath (Westmeath)

5 March 2017; 15:00; Round 3	Tipperary	0-28 - 0-21	Clare	Semple Stadium, Thurles; Attendance: 7,254; Referee: B Kelly (Westmeath)
5 March 2017; 15:00; Round 3	J McGrath (0-10, 5 frees); J O’Dwyer (0-5); N McGrath, S O’Brien (0-3 each); P Flynn (0-2); B Maher, N O’Meara, R Maher (free), D McCormack, S Curran (0-1 each).	Report	D Reidy (0-6, frees); J Conlon, P Collins (0-4 each); I Galvin (0-3); A Cunningham, C McInerney, S Morey, J McCarthy (0-1 each).	Semple Stadium, Thurles; Attendance: 7,254; Referee: B Kelly (Westmeath)

==== Division 1A Round 4 ====
11 March 2017; 19:00; Round 4	Tipperary	2-17 – 3-14	Kilkenny	Semple Stadium, Thurles; Attendance: 14,763; Referee: J Owens (Wexford)
11 March 2017; 19:00; Round 4	S Callanan (0-6, 3f, 1 45), J McGrath (1-2), N O'Meara (1-1), S Curran (0-2), D McCormack (0-2), N McGrath (0-1), J O'Dwyer (0-1), P Maher (0-1), S O'Brien (0-1).	Report	TJ Reid (3-5, 2 gls pen, 4f), R Hogan (0-4), C Buckley (0-3), W Walsh (0-2).	Semple Stadium, Thurles; Attendance: 14,763; Referee: J Owens (Wexford)

12 March 2017; 14:00; Round 4	Clare	0-20 - 1-15	Dublin	Cusack Park, Ennis; Attendance: 4,370; Referee: A Kelly (Galway)
12 March 2017; 14:00; Round 4	D Reidy (0-8, 0-7 frees); I Galvin (0-3); S Morey, J Shanahan (0-2 each); J McCarthy, P Collins, A Cunningham, C McInerney (0-1 each).	Report	R O’Dwyer (1-0); C Bennett (0-2 frees, 0-1 ’65); N McMorrow (0-3); D Burke (0-2 frees), B Quinn, E Dillon (0-2 each); L Rushe, C Crummey, F Mac Gib (0-1 each).	Cusack Park, Ennis; Attendance: 4,370; Referee: A Kelly (Galway)

12 March 2017; 14:00; Round 4	Waterford	1-13 - 1-21	Cork	Walsh Park, Waterford; Attendance: 6,629; Referee: B Kelly (Westmeath)
12 March 2017; 14:00; Round 4	P Mahony (0-8, frees); Shane Bennett 1-0; P Curran (0-2); M Shanahan, A Gleeson, Stephen Bennett (0-1 each).	Report	C Lehane (0-8, 7 frees); L Meade (1-1); B Cooper (0-3); C Joyce, A Nash (free), M Coleman, M Cahalane, D Brosnan, S Kingston, S Harnedy, L McLoughlin, P Horgan ( 0-1 each).	Walsh Park, Waterford; Attendance: 6,629; Referee: B Kelly (Westmeath)

==== Division 1A Round 5 ====
26 March 2017; 15:00; Round 5	Clare	1-22 - 2-21	Waterford	Cusack Park, Ennis; Attendance: 6,640; Referee: J Keenan (Wicklow)
26 March 2017; 15:00; Round 5	T Kelly 0-7 (5f), P Collins 1-3, C McInerney. J Conlon, A Shanagher 0-2 each, I Galvin, D McInerney, J Shanahan, D Fitzgerald, J McCarthy, B Duggan 0-1 each.	Report	P Mahony 0-10 (8f), Shane Bennett, T Devine 1-1 each, Stephen Bennett 0-3, A Gleeson, B O’Halloran 0-2 each, P Curran, T Ryan 0-1 each.	Cusack Park, Ennis; Attendance: 6,640; Referee: J Keenan (Wicklow)

26 March 2017; 15:00; Round 5	Cork	0-26 - 3-16	Tipperary	Páirc Uí Rinn, Cork; Attendance: 8,376; Referee: B Gavin (Offaly)
26 March 2017; 15:00; Round 5	P Horgan 0-15 (0-10 frees, 0-1 65), D Fitzgibbon 0-5, A Cadogan, S Harnedy 0-2 each, L Meade, C Lehane (0-1 free) 0-1 each.	Report	S Callanan 2-6 (0-4 frees, 0-1 65), J McGrath 1-1, D McCormack, P Maher 0-2 each, J Forde, P Flynn, R Maher (0-1 sideline) 0-1 each.	Páirc Uí Rinn, Cork; Attendance: 8,376; Referee: B Gavin (Offaly)

26 March 2017; 15:00; Round 5	Dublin	1-16 - 2-20	Kilkenny	Parnell Park, Dublin; Referee: P O'Dwyer (Carlow)
26 March 2017; 15:00; Round 5	D Burke 1-9 (0-7 frees), C Crummey 0-3, B Quinn, R O’Dwyer, C Boland and N McMorrow 0-1 each.	Report	TJ Reid 0-10 (0-6 frees), C Martin 1-5, L Blanchfield 1-2, C Fogarty, W Walsh and R Hogan 0-1 each.	Parnell Park, Dublin; Referee: P O'Dwyer (Carlow)

== Division 1B ==
=== Division 1B Table ===
Promoted team NHL champions relegated team

Team	Pld	W	D	L	F	A	Diff	Pts
Wexford (P)	5	5	0	0	8-94	5-74	29	10
Galway (C)	5	4	0	1	13-113	4-74	66	8
Limerick	5	3	0	2	14-111	8-80	49	6
Offaly	5	1	0	4	6-83	11-107	-39	2
Kerry (R)	5	1	0	4	8-62	11-101	-48	2
Laois	5	1	0	4	5-95	15-122	-57	2

=== Division 1B Rounds 1 to 5 ===
==== Division 1B Round 1 ====
12 February 2017; 13:00; Round 1	Offaly	1-12 - 6-23	Galway	O'Connor Park, Tullamore; Referee: C Lyons (Cork)
12 February 2017; 13:00; Round 1	S Dooley (0-08, 0-08f), S Cleary (1-01), C Kiely (0-02), S Ryan (0-01).	Report	J Flynn (2-10, 0-08f), C Whelan (2-00), C Cooney (0-06, 0-01f), D Burke (1-01), B Molloy (1-00), J Cooney (0-03), J Coen (0-01), N Burke (0-01), A Tuohy (0-01).	O'Connor Park, Tullamore; Referee: C Lyons (Cork)

12 February 2017; 14:00; Round 1	Kerry	3-14 - 0-19	Laois	Austin Stack Park, Tralee; Attendance: 577; Referee: J Murphy (Limerick)
12 February 2017; 14:00; Round 1	P Boyle (2-1, 1-0 pen), S Nolan (0-6, 5f), C Harty (1-2), M Boyle (0-2), D Collins (0-2), P O’Connor (0-1).	Report	S Maher (0-11f), W Dunphy (0-4), N Foyle (0-1), PJ Scully (0-1 sl), B Conroy (0-1), P Whelan (0-1).	Austin Stack Park, Tralee; Attendance: 577; Referee: J Murphy (Limerick)

12 February 2017; 14:00; Round 1	Wexford	1-14 - 0-14	Limerick	Innovate Wexford Park, Wexford; Referee: D Kirwan (Cork)
12 February 2017; 14:00; Round 1	C McDonald (1-8, 0-4 frees, 0-1 ’65); P Doran, L Chim (0-2 each); D O’Keeffe, H Kehoe (0-1 each).	Report	P Casey (0-5, 0-3 frees); G Mulcahy (0-2); D Byrnes (0-1 free), D Hannon, S Hickey, J Ryan, G Hegarty, J Fitzgibbon (0-1 free), C Lynch (0-1 each).	Innovate Wexford Park, Wexford; Referee: D Kirwan (Cork)

==== Division 1B Round 2 ====
18 February 2017; 19:00; Round 2	Laois	1-26 - 1-20	Offaly	O'Moore Park, Portlaoise; Referee: J Ryan (Tipperary)
18 February 2017; 19:00; Round 2	S Maher 0-12 (7f), C Dwyer 0-5, R King 0-3, N Foyle 1-0, W Dunphy, C Taylor 0-2 each, P Whelan, P Purcell 0-1 each.	Report	S Dooley 0-10f, O Kelly 1-2, C Kiely 0-3, S Cleary, P Geraghty 0-2 each, P Delaney 0-1.	O'Moore Park, Portlaoise; Referee: J Ryan (Tipperary)

19 February 2017; 14:00; Round 2	Galway	3-13 - 1-21	Wexford	Pearse Stadium, Salthill; Attendance: 7,006; Referee: C McAllister (Cork)
19 February 2017; 14:00; Round 2	J Flynn 0-5 (0-2f, 0-1 ’65), J Cooney 1-1, J Canning 1-0 (1-0 pen), J Coen 1-0, C Cooney 0-3, C Callanan 0-1 (0-1f), B Molloy 0-1, David Burke 0-1, C Whelan 0-1	Report	C McDonald 0-7 (0-5f), M Fanning 1-0 (1-0 pen), L Chin 0-3 (0-2f), P Morris 0-3, A Nolan 0-2, S Donohoe 0-1, D Redmond 0-1, M O’Hanlon 0-1, B Carton 0-1, D O’Keefe 0-1, P Doran 0-1.	Pearse Stadium, Salthill; Attendance: 7,006; Referee: C McAllister (Cork)

19 February 2017; 14:00; Round 2	Limerick	6-21 - 3-8	Kerry	Gaelic Grounds, Limerick; Referee: A Kelly (Galway)
19 February 2017; 14:00; Round 2	R Lynch 3-11 (2-5f, 0-2 65s, 0-1 pen), T Morrissey 1-3, G Mulcahy 1-1, S Tobin 0-4, K O’Brien 1-0, J Ryan & A La Touche Cosgrave 0-1 each.	Report	P Boyle 3-0, S Nolan 0-5f, P Kelly, J Conwawy & J Goulding (f) 0-1 each.	Gaelic Grounds, Limerick; Referee: A Kelly (Galway)

==== Division 1B Round 3 ====
4 March 2017; 17:00; Round 3	Limerick	1-25 - 3-15	Offaly	Gaelic Grounds, Limerick
4 March 2017; 17:00; Round 3	R Lynch 0-11 (10f), A La Touche Cosgrave 1-1, G Hegarty 0-3, P Ryan & J Ryan 0-2 each, D Byrnes, J Fitzgibbon, D Dempsey, S Tobin, D O’Donovan & G Mulcahy 0-1 each.	Report	S Dooley 2-11 (0-8f, 0-1 sl), O Kelly 1-0, C Doughan 0-2, C Kiely & E Nolan 0-1 each.	Gaelic Grounds, Limerick

5 March 2017; 14:00; Round 3	Galway	3-31 - 1-11	Laois	Pearse Stadium, Salthill; Referee: P O'Dwyer (Carlow)
5 March 2017; 14:00; Round 3	C Mannion 1-5, J Flynn 0-6 (0-4f, 0-1 65), J Canning 1-2 (1-0 pen), P Flaherty 0-5, C Whelan 1-0, C Cooney 0-3, T Monaghan 0-3, J Cooney 0-1, David Burke 0-1, P Mannion 0-1, P Killeen 0-1, A Harte 0-1, Daithi Burke 0-1, J Coen 0-1.	Report	R King 0-6 (0-3f, 0-1 65), S Bergin 1-0, A Corby 0-1, P Purcell 0-1, C Taylor 0-1, B Conroy 0-1, A Dunphy 0-1.	Pearse Stadium, Salthill; Referee: P O'Dwyer (Carlow)

5 March 2017; 14:00; Round 3	Wexford	3-18 - 0-12	Kerry	Innovate Wexford Park, Wexford; Referee: J Keenan (Wicklow)
5 March 2017; 14:00; Round 3	C McDonald 0-6 (5f), D O’Keeffe, H Kehoe, J Guiney 1-1 each; L Chin 0-4 (1f), D Reck, M O’Hanlon, P Morris, W Devereux, E Martin 0-1 each.	Report	C Harty, J Buckley, P O’Connor 0-2 each; B Murphy, J Goulding, D Collins, J Conway, P Boyle (f), B O’Leary 0-1 each.	Innovate Wexford Park, Wexford; Referee: J Keenan (Wicklow)

==== Division 1B Round 4 ====
11 March 2017; 19:00; Round 4	Laois	1-19 - 6-33	Limerick	O'Moore Park, Portlaoise; Referee: B Gavin (Offaly)
11 March 2017; 19:00; Round 4	R King 0-8 (0-6 frees), C Dwyer 0-5 (sideline cut), A Dunphy 0-3, E Rowland 1-0 (penalty), B Conroy 0-2 (0-2 free), W Dunphy 0-1.	Report	G Hegarty 2-6, S Dowling 1-8 (0-6 frees), K Hayes 2-2, C Ryan 1-1, P Casey, R Lynch (0-1 free) 0-4 each, W O’Donoghue 0-3, J Ryan 0-2, (free), D Morrissey, P Ryan, D Hannon 0-1 each.	O'Moore Park, Portlaoise; Referee: B Gavin (Offaly)

12 March 2017; 14:00; Round 4	Kerry	0-12 - 1-22	Galway	Austin Stack Park, Tralee; Referee: C Lyons (Cork)
12 March 2017; 14:00; Round 4	S Nolan (0-06f), J Conway (0-02), P Boyle (0-01), C Harty (0-01), B O'Leary (0-01), K Carmody (0-01).	Report	J Canning (0-09, 6f), C Mannion (0-05), P Brehony (1-00), N Burke (0-02), P Flaherty (0-02), S Maloney (0-01), G McInerney (0-01), C Whelan (0-01), D Burke (0-01).	Austin Stack Park, Tralee; Referee: C Lyons (Cork)

12 March 2017; 14:00; Round 4	Offaly	0-15 - 1-17	Wexford	O'Connor Park, Tullamore; Referee: C McAllister (Cork)
12 March 2017; 14:00; Round 4	S Dooley 0-10 (0-8f, 0-1 ’65), S Cleary 0-3, S Quirke 0-1, O Kelly 0-1.	Report	C McDonald 1-6 (0-4f), P Morris 0-2, D O’Keefe 0-2, A Nolan 0-2, J O’Connor 0-1, D Redmond 0-1, L Chin 0-1, H Kehoe 0-1, D Dunne 0-1.	O'Connor Park, Tullamore; Referee: C McAllister (Cork)

==== Division 1B Round 5 ====
26 March 2017; 15:00; Round 5	Kerry	2-16 - 1-21	Offaly	Austin Stack Park, Tralee; Referee: S Cleere (Kilkenny)
26 March 2017; 15:00; Round 5	S Nolan ( 1-6, 5 frees, 1’65), P Boyle ( 1-5), B Murphy, P O’Connor, C Harty, J Conway and K Carmody ( 0-1 each).	Report	S Dooley ( 0-6, 5 frees), C Kiely ( 0-5, 2frees), S Cleary ( 0-4), S Quirke ( 1-0), D King and E Nolan (0-2 each), B Conneely and P Geraghty ( 0-1 each).	Austin Stack Park, Tralee; Referee: S Cleere (Kilkenny)

26 March 2017; 15:00; Round 5	Limerick	1-18 - 0-24	Galway	Gaelic Grounds, Limerick; Referee: J McGrath (Westmeath)
26 March 2017; 15:00; Round 5	S Dowling 0-11 (8fs), C Lynch 1-1, G Mulcahy 0-2, S Hickey 0-1, D Dempsey 0-1, K Hayes 0-1, G Hegarty 0-1.	Report	J Canning 0-10 (6fs, 1’sl), D Burke 0-6, C Mannion 0-2, P Flaherty 0-1, J Coen 0-1, A Harte 0-1, S Maloney 0-1, T Monaghan 0-1, N Burke 0-1.	Gaelic Grounds, Limerick; Referee: J McGrath (Westmeath)

26 March 2017; 15:00; Round 5	Wexford	2-24 - 2-20	Laois	Innovate Wexford Park, Wexford; Referee: D Kirwan (Cork)
26 March 2017; 15:00; Round 5	D Dunne 1-2, D O’Keeffe 1-0, J Guiney 0-7 (3f, 1 ‘65), C McDonald 0-4 (2f), L Chin (1f), P Morris 0-3 each, A Nolan 0-2, M O’Hanlon, E Martin, K Foley 0-1 each.	Report	R King 0-10 (9f), P Purcell 1-3, N Foyle 1-1, C Dwyer, W Dunphy 0-2 each; C Taylor, B Conroy 0-1 each.	Innovate Wexford Park, Wexford; Referee: D Kirwan (Cork)

== Division 1 Knockout ==
=== Division 1 Quarter-Finals ===
On a pilot basis in 2017, the hurling quarter-finals will finish on the day the games are played avoiding the need for replays. If the score is level after the initial seventy minutes, still level after two ten minute periods of extra time played each way, and still level after a further two five minute periods of extra time, a free-taking competition will be held. Each team will nominate five players to take frees from their chosen position on the sixty five metre line. If the teams score an equal number of the five frees, the outcome of the match will be decided by sudden death frees using the same nominated players in the same order.

2 April 2017; 16:00; Quarter-final	Offaly	3-13 – 4-28	Tipperary	O'Connor Park, Tullamore; Attendance: 8,032; Referee: C Lyons (Cork)
2 April 2017; 16:00; Quarter-final	S Dooley 2-8 (0-6f), O Kelly 1-0, P Murphy 0-2, A Treacy, S Ryan & C Kiely 0-1 each.	Report	S Callanan 2-11 (0-7f, 0-1 65), N O’Meara 0-5, P Flynn & S O’Brien 1-1 each, D McCormack 0-4, M Breen 0-3, N McGrath, J O’Dwyer & S Cahill 0-1 each.	O'Connor Park, Tullamore; Attendance: 8,032; Referee: C Lyons (Cork)

2 April 2017; 16:00; Quarter-final	Cork	1-18 – 1-20	Limerick	Páirc Uí Rinn, Cork; Attendance: 7,892; Referee: F Horgan (Tipperary)
2 April 2017; 16:00; Quarter-final	P Horgan (0-8, 0-7 frees); L Meade (1-1); S Harnedy (0-3); M Coleman (0-1 ‘65), A Cadogan (0-2 each); A Nash (0-1 free), B Cooper (0-1 each)	Report	S Dowling (0-9, 0-8 frees); G Hegarty (0-4); D Dempsey (1-1); K Hayes, C Lynch (0-2 each); A Dempsey, J Fitzgibbon (0-1 each)	Páirc Uí Rinn, Cork; Attendance: 7,892; Referee: F Horgan (Tipperary)

2 April 2017; 16:00; Quarter-final	Galway	2-22 – 2-19	Waterford	Pearse Stadium, Salthill; Attendance: 12,082; Referee: B Kelly (Westmeath)
2 April 2017; 16:00; Quarter-final	J Canning (1-10, 1-0 pen,0-4 frees, 1 sideline); C Cooney (1-0); C Whelan (0-3); N Burke, A Harte, D Burke (0-2 each); C Mannion, T Monaghan, P Mannion (0-1 each).	Report	T Devine (2-1); M Shanahan (0-6 4 frees); S Roche (0-3); K Moran, T Ryan, DJ Foran (0-2 each); Stephen Bennett, M O’Brien, S Keating (0-1 each).	Pearse Stadium, Salthill; Attendance: 12,082; Referee: B Kelly (Westmeath)

2 April 2017; 16:00; Quarter-final	Kilkenny	0-19 – 2-18	Wexford	Nowlan Park, Kilkenny; Attendance: 14,568; Referee: A Kelly (Galway)
2 April 2017; 16:00; Quarter-final	TJ Reid 0-10 (0-9 frees), L Blanchfield 0-3, O Walsh 0-2, P Deegan, C Buckley, W Walsh, R Hogan 0-1 each.	Report	C McDonald 1-8 (0-4 frees), P Morris 0-3, L Chin 0-3 (0-1 free), D Dunne 1-0, M Fanning 0-2 (frees), D O'Keeffe and D Redmond 0-1 each.	Nowlan Park, Kilkenny; Attendance: 14,568; Referee: A Kelly (Galway)

=== Division 1 Semi-Finals ===
On a pilot basis in 2017, the hurling semi-finals will finish on the day the games are played avoiding the need for replays. If the score is level after the initial seventy minutes, still level after two ten minute periods of extra time played each way, and still level after a further two five minute periods of extra time, a free-taking competition will be held. Each team will nominate five players to take frees from their chosen position on the sixty five metre line. If the teams score an equal number of the five frees, the outcome of the match will be decided by sudden death frees using the same nominated players in the same order.

16 April 2017; 2:00 pm Semi-final	Limerick	1-11 – 1-21	Galway	Gaelic Grounds, Limerick; Attendance: 9,563; Referee: P O'Dwyer (Carlow)
16 April 2017; 2:00 pm Semi-final	S Dowling (0-5, 0-4 frees); W O’Donoghue (1-0); B Nash (0-2); D Byrnes, D Dempsey, C Lynch, J Fitzgibbon (0-1 each).	Report	C Cooney (1-4); J Canning (0-7, 0-6 frees); C Mannion (0-4); C Whelan (0-2); J Coen, P Mannion, D Burke, T Monaghan (0-1 each).	Gaelic Grounds, Limerick; Attendance: 9,563; Referee: P O'Dwyer (Carlow)

16 April 2017; 4:00 pm Semi-final	Tipperary	5-18 - 1-19	Wexford	Nowlan Park, Kilkenny; Attendance: 19,095; Referee: D Kirwan (Cork)
16 April 2017; 4:00 pm Semi-final	N McGrath 2-2, J McGrath 2-2, B Maher 1-2, S Callanan 0-3 (1 65), M Breen 0-4, J Forde 0-2, P Maher, J O’Dwyer & D Quinn 0-1 each.	Report	C McDonald 0-7 (6f), L Chin 0-4 (1 65), D Redmond 0-3, L Ryan 1-0, J O’Connor, D Dunne, D O’Keeffe, P Morris & K Foley 0-1 each.	Nowlan Park, Kilkenny; Attendance: 19,095; Referee: D Kirwan (Cork)

=== Division 1 Final ===
23 April 2017; 15:30; Final	Tipperary	0-14 - 3-21	Galway	Gaelic Grounds, Limerick; Attendance: 16,089; Referee: C Lyons (Cork)
23 April 2017; 15:30; Final	J McGrath (0-06, 0-05f), M Breen (0-02), N McGrath (0-02), R Maher (0-02, 0-02f), J O’Dwyer (0-01, 0-1f), B Maher (0-01).	Report	J Canning (0-09, 0-03f, 0-02 65), J Flynn (2-01), C Whelan (0-05), C Mannion (1-01), A Harte (0-02); J Coen (0-01), T Monaghan (0-01), David Burke (0-01).	Gaelic Grounds, Limerick; Attendance: 16,089; Referee: C Lyons (Cork)

=== Division 1A relegation play-off ===
2 April 2017; 16:00; Play-off	Clare	3-18 - 0-19	Dublin	Cusack Park, Ennis; Attendance: 7,276; Referee: J Ryan (Tipperary)
2 April 2017; 16:00; Play-off	T Kelly (1-3), D Reidy (0-6, 5f), A Shanagher (1-2), J Conlon (1-1); J McCarthy (0-2), C Galvin (0-2); D Fitzgerald (0-1), A Cunningham (0-1).	Report	D Treacy (0-7, 5f), D Burke (0-3), C Crummey (0-3), E Dillon (0-3), C Conway (0-2); N McMorrow (0-1).	Cusack Park, Ennis; Attendance: 7,276; Referee: J Ryan (Tipperary)

=== Division 1B relegation play-off ===
1 April 2017; 19:00; Play-off	Kerry	4-20 - 1-30 (aet)	Laois	O'Moore Park, Portlaoise; Referee: P Dwyer (Carlow)
1 April 2017; 19:00; Play-off	P Kelly (1-04), P Boyle (1-03, 1-01 f), C Harty (0-05), S Nolan (0-04, 3f); M Boyle (1-00), J Conway (1-00), J Goulding (0-01); D Collins (0-01), J Buckley (0-01), K Carmody (0-01).	Report	R King (0-12, 7f), C Dwyer (1-01, 1f), P Purcell (0-04); S Maher (0-03), W Dunphy (0-03, 1sl), L Bergin (0-01), E Rowland (0-01, f); L O'Connell (0-01), R Mullaney (0-01); C Collier (0-01), A Corby (0-01), P Whelan (0-1).	O'Moore Park, Portlaoise; Referee: P Dwyer (Carlow)

=== Division 1 Scoring Statistics ===
Top scorer overall

Rank	Player	Team	Tally	Total	Matches	Average
1	Shane Dooley	Offaly	4-53	65	6	10.83
2	T. J. Reid	Kilkenny	3-49	58	6	9.66
3	Joe Canning	Galway	3-47	56	7	8.00
4	Conor McDonald	Wexford	3-46	55	7	7.85
5	Pauric Mahony	Waterford	0-48	48	6	8.00
6	Séamus Callanan	Tipperary	4-34	46	5	9.20
7	John McGrath	Tipperary	5-27	42	7	6.00
8	Ross King	Laois	0-39	39	6	6.50
9	Donal Burke	Dublin	2-32	38	6	6.33
10	Shane Dowling	Limerick	1-33	36	4	9.00

Top scorers in a single game

Rank	Player	Club	Tally	Total	Opposition
1	Ronan Lynch	Limerick	3-11	20	Kerry
2	Shane Dooley	Offaly	2-11	17	Limerick
2	Séamus Callanan	Tipperary	2-11	17	Offaly
4	Jason Flynn	Galway	2-10	16	Offaly
5	Patrick Horgan	Cork	0-15	15	Tipperary
6	T. J. Reid	Kilkenny	3-05	14	Tipperary
7	Joe Canning	Galway	1-10	13	Waterford
8	Gearóid Hegarty	Limerick	2-06	12	Laois
8	Séamus Callanan	Tipperary	2-06	12	Cork
8	Donal Burke	Dublin	1-09	12	Kilkenny
8	Stephen Maher	Laois	0-12	12	Offaly
8	Pauric Mahony	Waterford	0-12	12	Dublin
8	Ross King	Laois	0-12	12	Kerry

== Division 2A ==
=== Division 2A Table ===
Division final, winner promoted to Division 1B Automatic relegation to Division 2B

Team	Pld	W	D	L	F	A	Diff	Pts
Carlow	5	3	2	0	9-100	7-61	45	8
Antrim (P)	5	3	1	1	6-84	3-79	14	7
Kildare	5	3	1	1	6-76	5-79	10	7
Westmeath	5	3	0	2	6-94	6-66	30	6
London	5	0	1	4	7-54	7-96	-42	1
Armagh (R)	5	0	1	4	4-66	11-102	-57	1

- Antrim are ranked above Kildare because they won the head-to-head game between the teams.
- London v. Armagh was a draw so they are ranked by score difference.

=== Division 2A Rounds 1 to 5 ===
==== Division 2A Round 1 ====
12 February 2017; 13:00; Round 1	Antrim	0-20 - 0-13	London	Corrigan Park, Belfast; Referee: M Murtagh (Westmeath)
12 February 2017; 13:00; Round 1	C Clarke 0-9 (7f), C McCann 0-3, C McKinley, N McKenna & D Murphy 0-2 each, P Shiels, Conor Johnston 0-1 each.	Report	S Bardon 0-7 (5f, 1 '65), E Kelly 0-2 (2f), B Regan, A Murphy, C Kerr & P Uniacke 0-1 each.	Corrigan Park, Belfast; Referee: M Murtagh (Westmeath)

12 February 2017; 13:15; Round 1	Armagh	1-15 - 1-18	Kildare	Athletic Grounds, Armagh; Referee: J Keane (Galway)
12 February 2017; 13:15; Round 1	D Magee 1-5 (3f) N Curry 0-3 (2f), C Corvan 0-3, D Carvill 0-2, C Carvill (1f) R Gaffney 0-1 each.	Report	D Reidy (3f) and J Mulhall 0-6 each, J Sheridan 1-2, B Byrne 0-2, P Moran and D Stapleton 0-1 each.	Athletic Grounds, Armagh; Referee: J Keane (Galway)

12 February 2017; 14:00; Round 1	Westmeath	1-11 - 1-13	Carlow	Cusack Park, Mullingar; Referee: J O'Brien (Laois)
12 February 2017; 14:00; Round 1	A Devine 0-6 (4f, 1'65'), N Mitchell 1-0, E Price, K Doyle 0-2 each, D McNicholas 0-1 (f).	Report	P Coady 0-6 (5f, 1'65'), S Murphy 1-0, JM Nolan 0-2, S Whelan, K McDonald (f), M Kavanagh, E Byrne, D Murphy (f) 0-1 each.	Cusack Park, Mullingar; Referee: J O'Brien (Laois)

==== Division 2A Round 2 ====
19 February 2017; 13:00; Round 2	Armagh	1-13 - 1-13	London	Athletic Grounds, Armagh; Referee: J Clarke (Cavan)
19 February 2017; 13:00; Round 2	D Carvill 0-6 (2fs), C Gorman 1-0, C Carvill, C Corvan 0-2, S Renaghan, E McGuinness, N Curry ('45') 0-1 each.	Report	K O'Loughlin 0-4, D Roberts 1-0, A Murphy, E Cooney, E Kelly (2fs) 0-2 each, S O'Donnell, S Bardon ('45'), O Sheil 0-1 each.	Athletic Grounds, Armagh; Referee: J Clarke (Cavan)

19 February 2017; 14:00; Round 2	Carlow	0-21 - 2-15	Antrim	Netwatch Cullen Park, Carlow; Referee: J Heffernan (Wexford)
19 February 2017; 14:00; Round 2	P Coady 0-9, (8 fs, 1 '65'), S Murphy, E Byrne 0-3 each, J Kavanagh 0-2, D Byrne, D Murphy, M Kavanagh C Nolan 0-1 each.	Report	C Clarke 1-12, (1-11 fs), N McAuley 1-0, N McKenna 0-2, P Shiell 0-1.	Netwatch Cullen Park, Carlow; Referee: J Heffernan (Wexford)

19 February 2017; 14:00; Round 2	Kildare	1-16 - 0-14	Westmeath	St. Conleth's Park, Newbridge; Referee: D Hughes (Carlow)
19 February 2017; 14:00; Round 2	D Reidy 0-9 (7fs), J Mulhall 1-1, P Divilly, P Moran, C Bonus, B Byrne, J Sheridan, N O'Muineachain 0-1 each.	Report	A Devine 0-6 (2fs, 1 '65'), B Murtagh 0-3 (2fs, 1 '65'), K Doyle, R Greville 0-2 each, J Galvin 0-1.	St. Conleth's Park, Newbridge; Referee: D Hughes (Carlow)

==== Division 2A Round 3 ====
5 March 2017; 13:00; Round 3	Carlow	3-22 - 2-7	London	Netwatch Cullen Park, Carlow; Referee: M Murtagh (Westmeath)
5 March 2017; 13:00; Round 3	C Wall 2-3, P Coady 0-6 (5fs), C Nolan 1-4, J M Nolan, E Byrne 0-2 each, D English (f), S Whelan, J Kavanagh, S Murphy, J Doyle 0-1 each.	Report	K O'Loughlin 2-1 ( 1-0pen, 1-0f, 0-1s-l), S Bardon 0-5 (2fs, 1 '65'), O Gately 0-1.	Netwatch Cullen Park, Carlow; Referee: M Murtagh (Westmeath)

5 March 2017; 14:00; Round 3	Westmeath	3-29 - 0-16	Armagh	TEG Cusack Park, Mullingar; Referee: J Connors (Donegal)
5 March 2017; 14:00; Round 3	A Devine 1-11 (0-6fs), E Price 1-7, B Murtagh 1-4 (0-1 '65'), G Greville, N Mitchell, D Egerton 0-2 each, D McNicholas 0-1.	Report	D Carvill 0-10fs, C Corvan 0-3 (1f, 1pen), C Carvill, D McKenna, N Strain 0-1 each.	TEG Cusack Park, Mullingar; Referee: J Connors (Donegal)

5 March 2017; 14:00; Round 3	Antrim	1-16 - 1-14	Kildare	Páirc Mhuire, Cushendall; Referee: J O'Brien (Tipperary)
5 March 2017; 14:00; Round 3	C Clarke 1-6 (3f), C Johnston 0-5, E Campbell 0-2, P Burke, C McCann, D McKernan 0-1 each.	Report	D Reidy 0-8 (7f), B Byrne 1-1, M Reidy 0-2, J Mulhall, P Ryan, J Sheridan 0-1 each.	Páirc Mhuire, Cushendall; Referee: J O'Brien (Tipperary)

==== Division 2A Round 4 ====
12 March 2017; 13:00; Round 4	Westmeath	2-20 - 2-7	London	TEG Cusack Park, Mullingar; Referee: J Keane (Galway)
12 March 2017; 13:00; Round 4	A Devine 0-11 (7f); D McNicholas 1-2; D Egerton 1-0; P Greville 0-3; J Boyle 0-2; A Clarke, R Greville 0-1 each.	Report	K O'Loughlin 2-6; T Healy 0-1.	TEG Cusack Park, Mullingar; Referee: J Keane (Galway)

12 March 2017; 14:00; Round 4	Armagh	2-11 - 2-18	Antrim	Athletic Grounds, Armagh; Referee: D Hughes (Carlow)
12 March 2017; 14:00; Round 4	C Carvill 2-3, D Carvill 0-5 (5f), D McKenna, C Gorman, D Magee 0-1 each.	Report	D Murphy 0-7 (5f), C Clarke 1-3, C McCann 1-2, C McKinley, C Johnston 0-2 each, E Campbell, J McNaughton 0-1 each.	Athletic Grounds, Armagh; Referee: D Hughes (Carlow)

12 March 2017; 14:00; Round 4	Kildare	2-17 - 1-20	Carlow	St. Conleth's Park, Newbridge; Referee: C Canning (Antrim)
12 March 2017; 14:00; Round 4	D Reidy 1-8 (1-0pen, 5fs), P Divilly 1-5, J Sheridan 0-2 (1s), J Mulhall 0-1, R Ryan 0-1.	Report	P Coady 0-5 (3fs), C Wall 1-2, K McDonald 0-3fs, J Nolan 0-3 (1s), D English 0-2fs, J Kavanagh 0-1, J Murphy 0-1, S Whelan 0-1, E Byrne 0-1, M Kavanagh 0-1 ‘65.	St. Conleth's Park, Newbridge; Referee: C Canning (Antrim)

==== Division 2A Round 5 ====
26 March 2017; 13:00; Round 5	Kildare	1-21 - 2-14	London	Conneff Park, Clane
26 March 2017; 13:00; Round 5	D Reidy 1-10(5f, 1'65), M Delaney 0-3(1f), J Sheridan 0-2, B Byrne, J Mulhall, P Divilly and R Ryan 0-1 each.	Report	K O'Loughlin 0-6(3f), E Kelly 0-4f, S Lawless and S O'Donnell 1-0 each, E Cooney 0-2, N Rogers 0-1.	Conneff Park, Clane

26 March 2017; 13:00; Round 5	Antrim	1-15 - 0-20	Westmeath	Páirc Mhuire, Cushendall; Referee: J Heffernan (Wexford)
26 March 2017; 13:00; Round 5	D Murphy 0-12 (10f), C Clarke 1-0, N McManus (f), Conor Johnston & N McKenna 0-1 each.	Report	A Devine 0-12 (11f), A Clarke, N O'Brien and D McNicholas 0-2 each, P Greville (f) and J Galvin 0-1 each.	Páirc Mhuire, Cushendall; Referee: J Heffernan (Wexford)

26 March 2017; 13:00; Round 5	Carlow	4-24 - 0-11	Armagh	Netwatch Cullen Park, Carlow; Referee: T Carroll (Offaly)
26 March 2017; 13:00; Round 5	M Kavanagh 0-7 (3f, 1 '65), C Nolan 1-4, S Brennan 2-0, S Murphy 1-2, D Byrne 0-5 (1f), S Whelan 0-3, C Wall, R Kelly, J M Nolan 0-1 each.	Report	D Carvill 0-6 (4f), C Corvan 0-2, E McGuinness, C Carvill, R Gaffney 0-1 each.	Netwatch Cullen Park, Carlow; Referee: T Carroll (Offaly)

=== Division 2A Final ===
1 April 2017; 15:00; Final	Carlow	0-15 – 2-12	Antrim	Páirc Esler, Newry; Referee: M Murtagh
1 April 2017; 15:00; Final	P Coady (0-7, 6f, 1'65), M Kavanagh (0-3, 1'65), K McDonald (0-1), J Murphy (0-1), E Byrne (0-1), J Nolan (0-1), S Murphy (0-1).	Report	N McManus (1-4, 1-0pen, 0-3f), D Murphy (0-4f), E Campbell (1-0), P Burke (0-1); C Johnston (0-1); N McKenna (0-1), C Clarke (0-1).	Páirc Esler, Newry; Referee: M Murtagh

=== Division 2A Scoring Statistics ===
Top scorer overall

Rank	Player	Team	Tally	Total	Matches	Average
1	Allan Devine	Westmeath	1-46	49	5	9.80
2	David Reidy	Kildare	2-42	48	5	9.60
3	Ciarán Clarke	Antrim	4-31	43	6	7.16
6	Paul Coady	Carlow	0-33	33	5	6.60
4	Kevin O'Loughlin	London	4-17	29	4	7.25
4	David Carvill	Armagh	0-29	29	5	5.80
7	Déaglán Murphy	Antrim	0-25	25	5	5.00
8	Craig Wall	Carlow	4-06	18	5	3.60
9	Chris Nolan	Carlow	2-09	15	6	2.50
10	Cahal Carvill	Armagh	2-08	14	5	2.80

Top scorers in a single game

Rank	Player	Club	Tally	Total	Opposition
1	Ciarán Clarke	Antrim	1-12	15	Carlow
2	Allan Devine	Westmeath	1-11	14	Armagh
3	David Reidy	Kildare	1-10	13	London
4	Kevin O'Loughlin	London	2-06	12	Westmeath
4	Déaglán Murphy	Antrim	0-12	12	Westmeath
4	Allan Devine	Westmeath	0-12	12	Antrim
7	David Reidy	Kildare	1-08	11	Carlow
7	Allan Devine	Westmeath	0-11	11	London
9	Eoin Price	Westmeath	1-07	10	Armagh
9	David Carvill	Armagh	0-10	10	Westmeath

== Division 2B ==
=== Division 2B Table ===
Division final, winner promoted Bottom play-off, loser relegated

Team	Pld	W	D	L	F	A	Diff	Pts
Meath (P)	5	5	0	0	13-98	3-73	55	10
Wicklow	5	4	0	1	6-89	5-69	23	8
Down	5	3	0	2	6-87	7-82	2	6
Derry	5	2	0	3	7-72	6-87	-12	4
Mayo	5	1	0	4	3-78	9-87	-27	2
Roscommon (R)	5	0	0	5	4-65	9-91	-41	0

=== Division 2B Rounds 1 to 5 ===
==== Division 2B Round 1 ====
12 February 2017; 12:30; Round 1	Roscommon	0-7 - 2-17	Wicklow	Athleague Sportsfield, Athleague; Referee: J Larkin (Cork)
12 February 2017; 12:30; Round 1	R Fallon 0-3 (3fs), S Curley (1f), E Flanagan, N Connaughton, A Murphy 0-1 each.	Report	C Moorehouse 1-7 (1-0 pen, 2 '65s, 2fs), A O'Brien 1-2, A Byrne 0-4, G Connors 0-3, W Kinsella 0-1.	Athleague Sportsfield, Athleague; Referee: J Larkin (Cork)

12 February 2017; 13:00; Round 1	Meath	4-21 - 1-10	Down	Páirc Tailteann, Navan; Referee: P Murphy (Carlow)
12 February 2017; 13:00; Round 1	S Clynch 0-8 (7fs), J Kelly 0-5, A Gannon, S Quigley, A Forde 1-1 each, K Keena 1-0, P Farrell 0-2 (1f), K Keoghan, D Healy, N Heffernan 0-1 each.	Report	C Bailie 0-6 (5fs), D Toner 1-0, E Sands, P Og McCrickard, D McManus, C Mageean 0-1 each.	Páirc Tailteann, Navan; Referee: P Murphy (Carlow)

12 February 2017; 14:00; Round 1	Mayo	1-13 - 1-14	Derry	MacHale Park, Castlebar; Referee: J Connors (Donegal)
12 February 2017; 14:00; Round 1	C Freeman 0-3, K Feeney, 0-3 (1 '65), B Hunt 1-0, J McManus 0-2, D McLoughlin 0-2, C Scahill 0-2f, A Lyons 0-1.	Report	R Convery 1-5 (4f, 1-0 pen); P Cleary 0-4 (3f, 1'65); B Óg McGillian 0-2, A Grant 0-2, (2f), A Kelly 0-1.	MacHale Park, Castlebar; Referee: J Connors (Donegal)

==== Division 2B Round 2 ====
19 February 2017; 12:30; Round 2	Down	1-21 - 1-16	Roscommon	McKenna Park, Ballycran; Referee: K Brady (Louth)
19 February 2017; 12:30; Round 2	D Toner (0-12, 10f); G Johnson (1-1); C O'Prey (0-3); E Sands (0-3); M Magee (0-2).	Report	R Fallon (0-8, 6f); N Connaughton (0-5); A Murphy (1-0); S Curley (0-1, 1f); J Kilkenny (0-1); J Coyne (0-1).	McKenna Park, Ballycran; Referee: K Brady (Louth)

19 February 2017; 14:00; Round 2	Meath	2-19 - 0-16	Derry	Páirc Tailteann, Navan; Referee: A Devine (Westmeath)
19 February 2017; 14:00; Round 2	S Clynch 0-5 (3fs), A Gannon 1-1, S Quigley 0-4, J Kelly 0-3, P Farrell 1-0, A Forde 0-2, N Heffernan, G Kelly, K Keena, C McCabe 0-1 each.	Report	R Convery 0-6 (4fs), A Kelly 0-3, G McCormack, A Grant 0-2 each, D Cartin, O McCloskey, J O'Dwyer 0-1 each.	Páirc Tailteann, Navan; Referee: A Devine (Westmeath)

19 February 2017; 14:00; Round 2	Wicklow	2-17 - 1-17	Mayo	Aughrim County Ground, Aughrim; Referee: G Quilty (Kilkenny)
19 February 2017; 14:00; Round 2	C Moorehouse 0-6 (4fs), P Doyle 1-2, G O'Brien 1-1, A Byrne 0-3, A O'Brien, R Keddy 0-2 each, G Connors 0-1.	Report	K Feeney 0-7 (4f), J McManus 1-1, P Hickey 0-3, B Hunt 0-2, C Freeman, D McLoughlin, C Scahill (f), D McTigue 0-1 each.	Aughrim County Ground, Aughrim; Referee: G Quilty (Kilkenny)

==== Division 2B Round 3 ====
5 March 2017; 12:30; Round 3	Derry	1-11 - 1-21	Wicklow	Celtic Park, Derry; Referee: K Brady (Louth)
5 March 2017; 12:30; Round 3	A Grant 1-4 (4fs); G McCormick 0-3 (1f); A Kelly, O McKeever 0-1 each.	Report	C Moorehouse 0-8 (4fs); A O'Brien 1-5; R Keddy 0-2; D Staunton, J Henderson, E Dunne, E Kearns, G Byrne and J Byrne 0-1 each.	Celtic Park, Derry; Referee: K Brady (Louth)

5 March 2017; 14:00; Round 3	Mayo	0-12 - 2-23	Down	MacHale Park, Castlebar; Referee: S Hynes (Galway)
5 March 2017; 14:00; Round 3	K Feeney 0-10 (10f); J McManus 0-2.	Report	D Toner 1-9 (5f); C Taggart 0-5; M Magee 1-1; C O'Prey 0-3; C Mageean 0-2; C Woods ('65), C Egan, D McManus 0-1 each.	MacHale Park, Castlebar; Referee: S Hynes (Galway)

16 March 2017; 19:45; Round 3	Meath	2-16 - 1-16	Roscommon	Killegland West, Ashbourne
16 March 2017; 19:45; Round 3	S Quigley 0-9 (7fs), N Heffernan 2-1, G McGowan, K Keena 0-2 each, M O'Sullivan, D Reilly 0-1 each.	Report	E Flanagan (3fs,1 '65'), J Coyne (1f) 0-4 each, C Kenny 1-1, G Fallon 0-3, C Dolan 0-2, D Loughnane, E Costello 0-1 each.	Killegland West, Ashbourne

==== Division 2B Round 4 ====
12 March 2017; 13:00; Round 4	Derry	3-16 - 0-12	Roscommon	Celtic Park, Derry; Referee: J Clarke
12 March 2017; 13:00; Round 4	O McCloskey (1-1), A Kelly (1-1), A Grant (0-4, 2f), D Cartin (1-0), C Steele (0-3), M McGuigan (0-2), J O'Dwyer (0-2), B Og McGilligan (0-1), K Hinphey (0-1), R Convery (0-1).	Report	R Fallon (0-5, 4f), C Kenny (0-2), J Coyne (0-2), E Flanagan (0-1), A Finnerty (0-1), N Connaughton (0-1).	Celtic Park, Derry; Referee: J Clarke

12 March 2017; 14:00; Round 4	Mayo	0-15 - 2-19	Meath	James Stephens Park, Ballina; Referee: J Murphy
12 March 2017; 14:00; Round 4	K Feeney (0-9, 8f), S Boland (0-2), S Regan (0-1), A Phillips (0-1), B Hunt (0-1), D McLoughlin (0-1).	Report	S Clynch (0-11, 7f, 2'45), K Keena (1-1), N Heffernan (1-0), J Kelly (0-3), M O'Sullivan (0-2), A Gannon (0-1), J Toher (0-1).	James Stephens Park, Ballina; Referee: J Murphy

12 March 2017; 14:00; Round 4	Wicklow	0-18 - 0-11	Down	Pearse Park, Arklow; Referee: T Carroll
12 March 2017; 14:00; Round 4	C Moorehouse (0-9, 8f), A O'Brien (0-5, 2f), E McCormack (1-1), R Keddy (0-1), A Byrne (0-1), E Kearns (0-1)	Report	D Toner (0-5, 4f), C Egan (0-2), E Sands (0-1), C Taggart (0-1), S Nicholson (0-1), G Johnson (0-1 pen).	Pearse Park, Arklow; Referee: T Carroll

==== Division 2B Round 5 ====
26 March 2017; Round 5	Down	2-22 - 2-15	Derry	St. Patrick's Park, Portaferry; Referee: C Cunning (Antrim)
26 March 2017; Round 5	P Sheehan (1-9 0-7f,0-1 65"), D Toner (1-4), C Bailie (0-3), C Woods (0-2), C Mageean, D Hughes, M Magee, O McManus 0-1 each.	Report	R Convery (1-4, 1pen 4f), N Waldron (0-6, 0-5f), A Kelly (1-0), A Grant (0-2, 0-1f), O McCloskey (0-2).	St. Patrick's Park, Portaferry; Referee: C Cunning (Antrim)

26 March 2017; Round 5	Meath	3-23 - 1-16	Wicklow	Seán Elfie Park, Ratoath; Referee: M Murtagh (Westmeath)
26 March 2017; Round 5	P Farrell 1-12 (0-11f,) G McGowan 0-4, G Kelly, L Martyn 1-0 each, M Cullen 0-2, J Walsh, D Reilly, K Keoghan, C McCabe, E MacDonnachadh 0-1 each.	Report	E Donohoe 0-7fs, P Doyle 1-2, D Masterson 0-4, G Connors 0-2, E Kearns 0-1.	Seán Elfie Park, Ratoath; Referee: M Murtagh (Westmeath)

26 March 2017; Round 5	Roscommon	2-14 - 1-21	Mayo	Athleague Sportsfield, Athleague; Referee: J OBrien (Tipperary)
26 March 2017; Round 5	G Fallon 0-8 (7f), E Flanagan 1-1, C Kenny 0-3, E Costello 1-0, G Egan, C Coyle 0-1 each.	Report	K Feeney 0-5, (2f, 1 '65), P Hickey 1-2, S Regan 0-4, J Cotter, J McManus 0-3, S Boland, M Morley, D McLoughlin, D Kenny 0-1 each.	Athleague Sportsfield, Athleague; Referee: J OBrien (Tipperary)

=== Division 2B Final ===
1 April 2017; Final	Wicklow	2-15 - 4-24	Meath	Parnell Park, Dublin; Referee: M Murtagh
1 April 2017; Final	C Moorehouse (0-6, 5f), A O'Brien (1-2), G O'Brien (1-1), E McCormack (0-3), P Keane (0-1); D Staunton (0-1), P Doyle (0-1).	Report	M O'Sullivan (3-5), S Clynch (0-7, 6f), N Heffernan (1-0), J Kelly (0-3); J Keena (0-2); S Brennan (0-2), A Gannon (0-1), D Healy (0-1), K Keoghan (0-1); A Forde (0-1), S Quigley (0-1f).	Parnell Park, Dublin; Referee: M Murtagh

=== Division 2B relegation play-off ===
1 April 2017; Relegation play-off	Mayo	1-16 – 0-17	Roscommon	MacHale Park, Castlebar; Referee: J Connors (Donegal)
1 April 2017; Relegation play-off	K Feeney 1-10 (8f), S Regan, S Boland. C Freeman, B Hunt, J McManus and D McLoughlin 0-1 each.	Report	S Curley 0-5 (5f), E Flanagan 0-4 (3f), R Fallon 0-3 (2f), C Dolan, J Kilkenny, C Kenny, G Fallon and N Connaughton (0-1 each).	MacHale Park, Castlebar; Referee: J Connors (Donegal)

=== Division 2B Scoring Statistics ===
Top scorer overall

Rank	Player	Team	Tally	Total	Matches	Average
1	Kenny Feeney	Mayo	1-44	47	6	7.83
2	Danny Toner	Down	3-30	39	5	7.80
2	Christy Moorehouse	Wicklow	1-36	39	5	7.80
4	Stephen Clynch	Meath	0-31	31	4	7.75
5	Andy O'Brien	Wicklow	3-16	25	5	5.00
6	Ruairí Convery	Derry	2-16	22	5	4.40
7	Peter Farrell	Meath	1-15	20	4	5.00
8	Mark O'Sullivan	Meath	3-08	17	3	5.66
8	Alan Grant	Derry	1-14	17	5	3.40
8	Seán Quigley	Roscommon	1-14	17	3	5.66

Top scorers in a single game

Rank	Player	Club	Tally	Total	Opposition
1	Peter Farrell	Meath	1-12	15	Wicklow
2	Mark O'Sullivan	Meath	3-05	14	Wicklow
3	Kenny Feeney	Mayo	1-10	13	Roscommon
4	Danny Toner	Down	1-09	12	Mayo
4	Peter Sheehan	Down	1-09	12	Derry
4	Danny Toner	Down	0-12	12	Roscommon
7	Stephen Clynch	Meath	0-11	11	Mayo
8	Christy Moorehouse	Wicklow	1-07	10	Roscommon
8	Kenny Feeney	Mayo	0-10	10	Down
10	Christy Moorehouse	Wicklow	0-09	9	Down
10	Kenny Feeney	Mayo	0-09	9	Meath
10	Seán Quigley	Meath	0-09	9	Roscommon

== Division 3A ==
=== Division 3A Table ===
Fingal withdrew from hurling competitions in 2017, thereby reducing Division 3A from five to four teams. There was no relegation from Division 3A and a double round of games in this division was played.

Division final, winner in promoted

Team	Pld	W	D	L	F	A	Diff	Pts
Donegal (P)	6	4	0	2	12-106	6-92	32	8
Tyrone	6	4	0	2	11-92	9-75	23	8
Monaghan	6	4	0	2	10-85	11-78	4	8
Louth	6	0	0	6	7-70	14-108	-59	0

- Top three teams are ranked by score difference.

=== Division 3A Rounds 1 to 6 ===
==== Division 3A Round 1 ====
12 February 2017; 14:00; Round 1	Donegal	2-23 - 1-14	Louth	O'Donnell Park, Letterkenny
12 February 2017; 14:00; Round 1	L Henderson (0-8); D Coulter (0-5), K Campbell (1-1), D Flynn (0-4), C Doherty (1-0), E McDermott (0-2), D Cullen (0-2), R Kee (0-1).	Report	D Murphy (0-6), L Dwan (0-6), S Connolly (1-0), G Smyth (0-1), D O’Hanrahan (0-1).	O'Donnell Park, Letterkenny

12 February 2017; 14:00; Round 1	Tyrone	1-11 - 3-15	Monaghan	Healy Park, Omagh
12 February 2017; 14:00; Round 1	D Casey (1-07 4F), J Kelly (0-02 1f), T Morgan (0-01), R McKernan (0-01).	Report	B McGuigan (2-01), D Meegan (0-07 4F), S Leonard (1-00), F Rafter (0-03), E Mac Suibhne (0-01f), M Treanor (0-01), M Murphy (0-01), T Campbell (0-01).	Healy Park, Omagh

==== Division 3A Round 2 ====
19 February 2017; 14:00; Round 2	Monaghan	1-21 - 3-14	Donegal	St. Mary's Park, Castleblayney; Referee: K McGeeney (Roscommon)
19 February 2017; 14:00; Round 2	D Meegan 0-12 (10fs), B McGuigan 1-0, E Mac Suibhne 0-3 (1f, 1 '65'), M Murphy, S Leonard 0-2 each, M Treanor, PJ Boyle 0-1 each.	Report	L Henderson 0-6 (5fs), D Flynn 1-2, R Kee 1-1, D Cullen 1-0, J Boyle, N Cleary, E McDermott, C Doherty, D Coulter 0-1 each.	St. Mary's Park, Castleblayney; Referee: K McGeeney (Roscommon)

19 February 2017; 14:00; Round 2	Louth	0-12 - 5-16	Tyrone	Darver; Referee: P Murphy (Carlow)
19 February 2017; 14:00; Round 2	D Murphy 0-8 (7fs); D O'Hanrahan, G Kerrigan, S Callan, S Connelly 0-1 each.	Report	D Casey 1-5 (3fs); S Og Grogan 2-0; P O'Kelly 1-1; D Begley 0-4; D Marshall 1-0; J Kelly, C Grogan 0-2 each; T Morgan, R McKenna 0-1 each.	Darver; Referee: P Murphy (Carlow)

==== Division 3A Round 3 ====
26 February 2017; Round 3	Louth	1-8 - 1-10	Monaghan	Darver; Referee: A Devine
26 February 2017; Round 3	D Murphy 0-4 (3fs); P Lynch 0-2; D Mahony 1-0; R Maher, A McCrave 0-1 each.	Report	T Campbell 1-2; F Rafter 0-5 (3fs); C Boyle, R Curran, H Byrne 0-1 each.	Darver; Referee: A Devine

22 March 2017; Round 3	Tyrone	1-12 - 1-10	Donegal	Garvaghey

==== Division 3A Round 4 ====
5 March 2017; 14:00; Round 4	Monaghan	2-12 - 2-9	Louth	Grattan Park, Inniskeen; Referee: A Devine
5 March 2017; 14:00; Round 4	L McKenna 1-2; F Rafter 0-4; T Campbell 1-0; D Meegan 0-3 (3f); C Meegan 0-2; H Byrne 0-1 (f).	Report	D Murphy 1-3; L Dwan 0-3 (2f); D Mahony 1-0, S Connolly 0-2, G Smith 0-1.	Grattan Park, Inniskeen; Referee: A Devine

5 March 2017; 14:00; Round 4	Donegal	2-14 - 0-15	Tyrone	O'Donnell Park, Letterkenny; Referee: K McGeaney (Roscommon)
5 March 2017; 14:00; Round 4	D Flynn 2-8 (1f); L Henderson, D Cullen 0-2 each; R McDermott, D Coulter 0-1 each.	Report	D Casey 0-5 (1f, 1 '65); R McKernan 0-3; C Grogan, T Morgan 0-2 each; C Cross, J Kelly, M Mulgrew 0-1 each.	O'Donnell Park, Letterkenny; Referee: K McGeaney (Roscommon)

==== Division 3A Round 5 ====
12 March 2017; 14:00; Round 5	Donegal	1-21 - 2-13	Monaghan	O'Donnell Park, Letterkenny; Referee: S Hynes (Galway)
12 March 2017; 14:00; Round 5	L Henderson (0-8,7f); D Coulter (0-5); D Flynn (0-5), R McDermott (1-0), J Boyle (0-1), J O’Loughlin (0-1), S Gillespie (0-1).		D Meegan(1-9, 6f), S Leonard (1-0), E MacSuibhne (0-2, 2f), T Campbell (0-1), B McGuigan (0-1).	O'Donnell Park, Letterkenny; Referee: S Hynes (Galway)

12 March 2017; 14:00; Round 5	Tyrone	1-23 - 2-10	Louth	Páirc Naomh Colmcille, Carrickmore
12 March 2017; 14:00; Round 5	D Casey 1-10,			Páirc Naomh Colmcille, Carrickmore

==== Division 3A Round 6 ====
26 March 2017; Round 6	Louth	1-17 - 3-24	Donegal	Darver; Referee: G Quilty (Kilkenny)
26 March 2017; Round 6	G Smyth 0-10 (9fs); D Stephenson 1-1; G Kerrigan 0-2; S Conneelly, D Kettle, P McCormack and D Murphy 0-1 each.	Report	D Flynn 3-13 (9fs); D Cullen (1f), B Lafferty 0-3; C Melaugh 0-2; R McDermott, N Cleary, S Curran 0-1 each.	Darver; Referee: G Quilty (Kilkenny)

26 March 2017; Round 6	Monaghan	1-14 - 3-15	Tyrone	Cloghan; Referee: A Ferguson
26 March 2017; Round 6	D Meegan (0-9, 6f, 1'65), S Leonard (1-3), N Garland (0-2).	Report	D Casey (1-8, 0-6f), M Mulgrew (2-0), C Grogan (0-3), P O'Kelly (0-1), R McKernan (0-1), D Begley (0-1), P Daly (0-1).	Cloghan; Referee: A Ferguson

=== Division 3A Final ===
1 April 2017; 14:00; Final	Donegal	4-25 – 1-12	Tyrone	Celtic Park, Derry; Referee: Rory McGann (Clare)
1 April 2017; 14:00; Final	D Flynn 2-8, L Henderson 0-7 (6f), R McDermott 1-1, S Gillespie 1-0, J Boyle, B Lafferty, J De Ward 0-2 each, N Cleary, D Cullen, C Melaugh 0-1 each.	Report	D Casey 1-6 (2f), C Grogan 0-2, M Mulgrew, A Kelly, P McHugh 0-1 each	Celtic Park, Derry; Referee: Rory McGann (Clare)

=== Division 3A Scoring Statistics ===
Top scorer overall

Rank	Player	Team	Tally	Total	Matches	Average
1	Diarmuid Murphy	Louth	1-21	24	4	6.00
2	David Flynn	Donegal	3-14	23	3	7.66
2	Damian Casey	Tyrone	2-17	23	3	7.66
4	Donal Meegan	Monaghan	0-22	22	3	7.33
5	Lee Henderson	Donegal	0-16	16	3	5.33
6	Fergal Rafter	Monaghan	0-12	12	4	3-00
7	Brian McGuigan	Monaghan	3-01	10	3	3-33

Top scorers in a single game

Rank	Player	Club	Tally	Total	Opposition
1	David Flynn	Donegal	2-08	14	Tyrone
2	Donal Meegan	Monaghan	0-12	12	Donegal
3	Damian Casey	Tyrone	1-07	10	Monaghan
4	Damian Casey	Tyrone	1-05	8	Louth
4	Lee Henderson	Donegal	0-08	8	Louth
4	Diarmuid Murphy	Louth	0-08	8	Tyrone
7	Brian McGuigan	Monaghan	2-01	7	Tyrone
7	Donal Meegan	Monaghan	2-01	7	Tyrone
9	Diarmuid Murphy	Louth	1-03	6	Monaghan
9	Diarmuid Murphy	Louth	0-06	6	Donegal
9	Liam Dwan	Louth	0-06	6	Donegal
9	Lee Henderson	Donegal	0-06	6	Monaghan

== Division 3B ==
=== Division 3B Table ===
Division final, no promotion

Team	Pld	W	D	L	F	A	Diff	Pts
Longford (C)	4	3	0	1	7-64	8-49	12	6
Warwickshire	4	3	0	1	7-51	8-45	3	6
Sligo	4	2	0	2	7-38	6-39	12	4
Leitrim	4	1	0	3	10-49	6-67	−7	2
Fermanagh	4	1	0	3	4-45	9-50	−20	2

=== Division 3B Rounds 1 to 5 ===
==== Division 3B Round 1 ====
11 February 2017; Round 1	Warwickshire	3-9 - 3-8	Sligo	Páirc na hÉireann, Solihull
11 February 2017; Round 1	L Watson 2-7, C Convery 1-0, K McGee 0-2.		C Behan 1-4, E McDonagh 1-1, M Gilmartin 1-0, M Comerford 0-2, J Arthur 0-1.	Páirc na hÉireann, Solihull

12 February 2017; Round 1	Longford	2-13 - 0-7	Fermanagh	Glennon Brothers Pearse Park, Longford
12 February 2017; Round 1	C Mullane (0-4), L Kelly (1-0), E Kiernan (1-0); P Walsh (0-3), P Farrington (0-2), D Duggan (0-1), J Casey (0-1), C Keegan (0-1), S O'Brien (0-1).	Report		Glennon Brothers Pearse Park, Longford

==== Division 3B Round 2 ====
18 February 2017; 14:30; Round 2	Fermanagh	1-9 - 2-12	Warwickshire	Brewster Park, Enniskillen
18 February 2017; 14:30; Round 2	S Curran 0-5, S Corrigan 1-1, C McShea 0-1, R Bogue 0-1.		L Watson 2-10, D Kennedy 0-1, I Dwyer 0-1.	Brewster Park, Enniskillen

19 February 2017; 14:00; Round 2	Leitrim	3-13 - 2-19	Longford	Páirc Seán Mac Diarmada, Carrick; Referee: S Hynes (Galway)
19 February 2017; 14:00; Round 2	C Beirne 1-9 (0-8fs), C Cunniffe 1-2, C O'Donovan 1-0, D McGovern, C Moreton 0-1 each.	Report	C Mullane 1-8 (0-5fs), P Farrington 1-0, P Walshe 0-5 (1f, 2 '65s'), J Casey, C Keegan (1f), S Hannon 0-2 each.	Páirc Seán Mac Diarmada, Carrick; Referee: S Hynes (Galway)

==== Division 3B Round 3 ====
5 March 2017; 14:00; Round 3	Warwickshire	0-18 - 2-10	Leitrim	Páirc na hÉireann, Solihull
5 March 2017; 14:00; Round 3	L Watson (0-11, 1’65, 7fs), P Hoban (0-3), S Hennessy (0-1), I Dwyer (0-1), C Robbins (0-1).	Report	C Cunniffe (0-9, 6f), Z Moradi (1-0), C Moreton (0-1).	Páirc na hÉireann, Solihull

5 March 2017; 14:30; Round 3	Fermanagh	2-15 - 1-14	Sligo	St. Molaise Park, Irvinestown; Referee: J Larkin (Cork)
5 March 2017; 14:30; Round 3	S Corrigan 0-10 (6fs), C McShea 1-2, J-P McGarry 1-0, R Porteous, A Breslin, R O' Buaigh 0-1 each.	Report	K Raymond 0-7 (2fs), L Reidy 1-1, J Arthur 0-2, D Collins, E McDonagh, C Behan (f) T O'Kelly-Lynch 0-1.	St. Molaise Park, Irvinestown; Referee: J Larkin (Cork)

==== Division 3B Round 4 ====
11 March 2017; Round 4	Longford	2-18 - 2-12	Warwickshire	Pearse Park, Longford
11 March 2017; Round 4	C Mullane (1-8, 0-5f), R Murray (1-1), S Hannon (0-4), D Duggan (0-2f), P Walsh (0-2, 1f), C Keegan (0-1).	Report	C Robbins (1-3), C Convery (0-6f), K McGee (1-0), J Reddan (0-2), W Allen (0-1f).	Pearse Park, Longford

12 March 2017; 14:00; Round 4	Leitrim	1-15 - 3-16	Sligo	Páirc Seán Mac Diarmada, Carrick
12 March 2017; 14:00; Round 4	C Cunniffe 0-9, 7f; C Moreton 1-1; K McDermott & C Byrne 0-2 each; K O’Connor 0-1	Report	K Raymond 2-7, 4f; E Kilgallon 1-0; D Collins, T O’Kelly-Lynch, C Behan & C Griffin 0-2 each, A Markham 0-1	Páirc Seán Mac Diarmada, Carrick

==== Division 3B Round 5 ====
26 March 2017; Round 5	Fermanagh	1-14 - 4-11	Leitrim	Lisbellaw; Referee: K Brady (Louth)
26 March 2017; Round 5	JP McGarry 1-2, D McGarry 0-4 (1f), R Bogue 0-4 (1f), C McShea, T Cleary A Breslin and Shea Curran 0-1 each.	Report	P O'Donnell 2-6 (3f, 1 '65), K O'Connor 1-0, K Clarke 1-0, C Moreton 0-2, G O' Hagan 0-2, K McDermott 0-1.	Lisbellaw; Referee: K Brady (Louth)

26 March 2017; Round 5	Sligo	3-17 - 1-14	Longford	Markievicz Park, Sligo; Referee: K McGeeney (Roscommon)
26 March 2017; Round 5	K Raymond 2-10 (7f); T O'Kelly-Lynch 0-4; E McCarthy 1-1; D Collins, A Markham 0-1 each.	Report	C Mullane 0-8 (5f); P Farrington 1-1; P Walsh 0-2 (2f); D Duggan (1 '65'), C Keegan, J Casey 0-1 each.	Markievicz Park, Sligo; Referee: K McGeeney (Roscommon)

=== Division 3B Final ===
2 April 2017; 13:30; Final	Longford	4-19 – 3-20 (aet)	Warwickshire	Carrickmore, Tyrone

=== Division 3B Scoring Statistics ===
Top scorer overall

Rank	Player	Team	Tally	Total	Matches	Average
1	Liam Watson	Warwickshire	4-28	40	3	13.33
2	Johnson Casey	Longford	80-2400	2460	3	12.00
3	Cathal Mullane	Longford	2-28	34	4	8.50

Top scorers in a single game

Rank	Player	Club	Tally	Total	Opposition
1	Liam Watson	Warwickshire	2-10	16	Fermanagh
1	Keith Raymond	Sligo	2-10	16	Leitrim
3	Liam Watson	Warwickshire	2-07	13	Sligo
4	Keith Raymond	Sligo	2-07	13	Leitrim
5	Pádraig O'Donnell	Leitrim	2-06	12	Sligo
5	Cathal Beirne	Leitrim	1-09	12	Longford
5	Cathal Mullane	Longford	1-09	12	Leitrim
8	Cathal Mullane	Longford	1-08	11	Warwickshire
8	Liam Watson	Warwickshire	0-11	11	Leitrim
10	Seán Corrigan	Fermanagh	0-10	10	Sligo
