= Donnacha Ó Dálaigh =

Irish hurler

Personal information
- Native name: Donnacha Ó Dálaigh (Irish)
- Born: 23 May 2002 (age 24) Monaleen, County Limerick, Ireland

Sport
- Sport: Hurling
- Position: Left corner-forward
Club
- Years: Club
- Monaleen
Club titles
- Limerick titles: 0
College
- Years: College
- 2021-present: University of Limerick
College titles
- Fitzgibbon titles: 0
Inter-county*
Years	County	Apps (scores)
2023-	Limerick	7 (1-03)
Inter-county titles
- Munster titles: 2
- All-Irelands: 1
- NHL: 1
- All Stars: 0
- *Inter County team apps and scores correct as of 19:09, 25 May 2025.

Donnacha Ó Dálaigh (born 23 May 2002) is an Irish hurler. At club level, he plays with Monaleen, and at inter county he with the Limerick senior hurling team. He usually lines out as a forward.

== Career ==
Ó Dálaigh first played hurling at juvenile and underage levels with the Monaleen club, before progressing to adult level. He was at right corner-forward when Monaleen beat Bruff to win the Limerick PIHC title in 2022. Ó Dálaigh later won an All-Ireland club title after beating Tooreen in the final.

After being overlooked at minor level, Ó Dálaigh first played for the Limerick at under-20 level. He came on as a substitute when Limerick were beaten by Kilkenny in the 2022 All-Ireland under-20 final. He made his senior team debut during the 2023 National League.

== Career statistics ==
As of 21 March 2026.

Team	Year	National League			Munster		All-Ireland		Total	
Team	Year	Division	Apps	Score	Apps	Score	Apps	Score	Apps	Score
Limerick	2023	Division 1A	7	1-10	0	0-00	0	0-00	7	1-10
	2024		5	3-16	5	1-02	0	0-00	10	4-18
	2025		5	0-01	2	0-01	0	0-00	8	0-02
	2026		4	0-05	0	0-00	0	0-00	4	0-05
Career total			21	4-32	7	1-03	0	0-00	28	5-35

== Honours ==
Monaleen

- All-Ireland Intermediate Club Hurling Championship: 2023
- Munster Intermediate Club Hurling Championship: 2022
- Limerick Premier Intermediate Hurling Championship: 2022

Limerick

- Munster Under-20 Hurling Championship: 2022
