= Jimmy Quilty =

Irish hurler

Personal information
- Native name: Séamus Ó Caoilte (Irish)
- Born: 2002 (age 23–24) Ardpatrick, County Limerick, Ireland
- Occupation: Electrician

Sport
- Sport: Hurling
- Position: Midfield
Club
- Years: Club
- Blackrock
Club titles
- Limerick titles: 0
Inter-county*
Years	County	Apps (scores)
2022-present	Limerick	0 (0-00)
Inter-county titles
- Munster titles: 1
- All-Irelands: 1
- NHL: 0
- All Stars: 0
- *Inter County team apps and scores correct as of 20:25, 12 February 2022.

Jimmy Quilty (born 2002) is an Irish hurler. At club level he plays with Blackrock, while he is also a member of the Limerick senior hurling team. He usually lines out as a forward.

== Career ==
Quilty first played hurling at juvenile and underage levels with the Blackrock club, before progressing to adult level. He first appeared at inter-county level with Limerick as a member of the minor team that won the Munster MHC title in 2019. Quilty later spent three consecutive seasons with the under-20 team and was team captain when Limerick were beaten by Kilkenny in the 2022 All-Ireland under-20 final. He was also drafted onto the senior team that year and was part of the extended panel when Limerick won that year's All-Ireland title. Quilty made his debut during the 2023 National League.

== Career statistics ==
As of 11 February 2023.

Team	Year	National League			Munster		All-Ireland		Total	
Team	Year	Division	Apps	Score	Apps	Score	Apps	Score	Apps	Score
Limerick	2022	Division 1A	0	0-00	0	0-00	0	0-00	0	0-00
Limerick	2023	Division 1A	1	0-00	0	0-00	0	0-00	1	0-00
Career total			1	0-00	0	0-00	0	0-00	1	0-00

== Honours ==
Limerick

- All-Ireland Senior Hurling Championship: 2022
- Munster Senior Hurling Championship: 2022
- Munster Under-20 Hurling Championship: 2022
- Munster Minor Hurling Championship: 2019

Sporting positions
Preceded by Jack Ryan	Limerick under-20 hurling team captain 2021-2022	Succeeded by Ethan Hurley
