= Colin Coughlan =

Irish hurler

Personal information
- Native name: Cóilín Ó Cochláin (Irish)
- Born: 1 August 2002 (age 24) Clarina, County Limerick, Ireland
- Occupation: Student

Sport
- Sport: Hurling
- Position: Left wing-back
Club
- Years: Club
- Ballybrown
Club titles
- Limerick titles: 0
College
- Years: College
- 2021-present: University of Limerick
College titles
- Fitzgibbon titles: 3
Inter-county*
Years	County	Apps (scores)
2021-present	Limerick	13 (0-01)
Inter-county titles
- Munster titles: 5
- All-Irelands: 4
- NHL: 2
- All Stars: 0
- *Inter County team apps and scores correct as of 23:15, 19 July 2026.

Colin Coughlan (born 1 August 2002) is an Irish hurler. At club level, he plays with Ballybrown and at inter-county level with the Limerick senior hurling team.

== Early life ==
Born and raised in Clarina, County Limerick, Coughlan was educated at Ardscoil Rís in Limerick. He played in all grades of hurling during his time there and won a Dr Harty Cup medal in February 2018, as a panel member, following the 3–18 to 2–10 win over Midleton CBS in the final.

During his studies at the University of Limerick (UL), Coughlan continued his hurling development. He won a league and championship double with the freshers' team in 2022. Coughlan immediately progressed to UL's Fitzgibbon Cup team and claimed a winners' medal in that competition in February 2023, after the 4–19 to 1–13 win over the University of Galway. He won further Fitzgibbon Cup medals in 2025 and 2026, when he captained UL to back-to-back titles.

== Club career ==
Coughlan began his club career with Ballybrown, at a time when the club had multiple successes in the juvenile and underage grades. After winning the Limerick MAHC title in 2018, he won a Limerick Premier MHC title in 2019, following an 0–18 to 0–12 win over Doon in the final. Coughlan collected a second consecutive winners' medal in that competition in 2020, as Mungret were beaten by 3–23 to 0–20 . Ballybrown secured the Limerick Premier U19HC title in October 2021, with Coughlan lining out at centre-forward in the 2–30 to 1–17 win over Monaleen in the final. He added a Limerick Premier U21HC medal to his collection in 2022, following a seven-point win over Mungret in the final. By this stage Coughlan had already joined the Ballybrown senior team and made his debut in July 2020 in a 4–18 to 2–14 win over Blackrock.

== Inter-county career ==
Coughlan first appeared on the inter-county scene for Limerick during a two-year tenure with the minor team. He won a Munster MHC title in June 2019, following a 1–17 to 1–11 win over Clare in the final. Coughlan immediately progressed to the under-20 team and won a Munster U20HC in May 2022 following a four-point win over Tipperary. He was at left wing-back for Limerick's 0–19 to 0–18 defeat by Kilkenny in the 2022 All-Ireland U20HC final.

Coughlan made his senior team debut in a 0–33 to 2–19 National Hurling League defeat of Cork in June 2021. He later won a Munster SHC medal, as a panel member, as Limerick claimed a third consecutive title for the first time in 85 years following a 3–21 to 2–29 win over Tipperary. Coughlan later added an All-Ireland SHC medal to his collection, after coming on as a substitute for team captain Declan Hannon in the 3–32 to 1–22 defeat of Cork.

Coughlan's membership of the under-20 team in 2022 impacted on his senior team appearances that season. Limerick retained the Munster SHC title for a fourth consecutive year in June 2022, with Coughlan being an unused substitute in the 1–29 to 0–29 extra-time win over Clare. He later won his second consecutive All-Ireland SHC medal, again as an unused substitute, in the 1–31 to 2–26 win over Kilkenny in the 2022 All-Ireland SHC final.

Coughlan won his first National League medal in April 2023, after lining out at left wing-back in the 2–20 to 0–15 win over Kilkenny in the final. He later claimed his third Munster SHC medal, his first on the field of play, as Limerick beat Clare by 1–23 to 1–22 to win a record-equalling fifth consecutive title. Coughlan was an unused substitute when Limerick won a record-equalling fourth consecutive All-Ireland SHC title, following a 0–30 to 2–15 win over Kilkenny in the 2023 All-Ireland SHC final.

Coughlan was again an unused substitute when Limerick won a record-breaking sixth consecutive Munster SHC title after a 1–26 to 1–20 win over Clare in the 2024 Munster SHC final. After a trophy-less 2025 season, Limerick regained the National League title with a six-point win over Cork in April 2026, with Coughlan claiming his second winners' medal. He later collected a fifth Munster SHC medal, as an unused substitute, as Limerick also regained that title with a 1–21 to 2–17 win over Cork in the final. Coughlan won a fourth All-Ireland SHC medal, after coming on as a substitute for Seán Finn, in the 1–29 to 1–18 win over Galway in the 2026 All-Ireland SHC final.

== Career statistics ==
As of match played 19 July 2026.

Team	Year	National League			Munster		All-Ireland		Total	
Team	Year	Division	Apps	Score	Apps	Score	Apps	Score	Apps	Score
Limerick	2021	Division 1A	1	0-02	0	0-00	2	0-00	3	0-02
Limerick	2022	Division 1A	3	0-00	0	0-00	0	0-00	3	0-00
Limerick	2023	Division 1A	5	0-04	2	0-00	0	0-00	7	0-04
Limerick	2024	Division 1A	3	0-02	1	0-00	0	0-00	4	0-02
Limerick	2025	Division 1A	6	0-03	4	0-01	0	0-00	10	0-04
Limerick	2026	Division 1A	6	0-02	3	0-00	1	0-00	10	0-02
Career total			24	0-13	10	0-01	3	0-00	37	0-14

== Honours ==
University of Limerick

- Fitzgibbon Cup (3): 2023, 2025 (c), 2026 (c)

Ballybrown

- Limerick Premier Under-21 Hurling Championship (1): 2022
- Limerick Premier Under-19 Hurling Championship (1): 2021
- Limerick Premier Minor Hurling Championship (2): 2019, 2020
- Limerick Minor A Hurling Championship (1): 2018

Limerick

- All-Ireland Senior Hurling Championship (4): 2021, 2022, 2023, 2026
- Munster Senior Hurling Championship (5): 2021, 2022, 2023, 2024, 2026
- National Hurling League (2): 2023, 2026
- Munster Under-20 Hurling Championship (1): 2022
- Munster Minor Hurling Championship (1): 2019
