= Cian Scully =

Irish hurler

Personal information
- Native name: Cian Ó Scolaí (Irish)
- Born: 2003 (age 22–23) Athlacca, County Limerick, Ireland
- Occupation: Student

Sport
- Sport: Hurling
- Position: Centre-back
Club
- Years: Club
- 2022-present: Dromin/Athlacca
Club titles
- Limerick titles: 0
College
- Years: College
- 2023-present: Mary Immaculate College
College titles
- Fitzgibbon titles: 0
Inter-county*
Years	County	Apps (scores)
2024-present	Limerick	0 (0-00)
Inter-county titles
- Munster titles: 0
- All-Irelands: 0
- NHL: 0
- All Stars: 0
- *Inter County team apps and scores correct as of 12:46, 2 February 2025.

Cian Scully (born 2002) is an Irish hurler. At club level he plays with Dromin/Athlacca and at inter-county level he lines out with the Limerick senior hurling team.

== Career ==
Scully played hurling at levels as a student at Ardscoil Rís in Limerick. He eventually progressed to the senior team and was a Dr Harty Cup runner-up in 2023. Scully later played hurling with Mary Immaculate College. He captained the freshers' team in his first year, before joining the Fitzgibbon Cup team in 2025.

At club level, Scully first played for Dromin/Athlacca at adult level in 2022. He was part of the team that won the club's inaugural Limerick PIHC title in 2023, following a 2–20 to 3–16 win over Blackrock in the final.

Scully first appeared on the inter-county scene with Limerick during a two-year tenure with the minor team. He was a member of the extended panel in 2020 when Limerick won the Munster MHC title. Scully immediately progressed to the under-20 team and was at wing-back when Kilkenny beat Limerick in the 2022 All-Ireland under-20 final. He captained the under-20 team in 2024, in what was his last season in the grade.

Scully made his senior team debut in a National Hurling League game against Cork in February 2025.

== Career statistics ==
As of 22 March 2025.

Team	Year	National League			Munster		All-Ireland		Total	
Team	Year	Division	Apps	Score	Apps	Score	Apps	Score	Apps	Score
Limerick	2025	Division 1A	2	0-00	0	0-00	0	0-00	2	0-00
Career total			2	0-00	0	0-00	0	0-00	2	0-00

== Honours ==
Dromin/Athlacca

- Limerick Premier Intermediate Hurling Championship: 2023

Limerick

- Munster Under-20 Hurling Championship: 2022
- Munster Minor Hurling Championship: 2020

Sporting positions
Preceded by Ethan Hurley	Limerick under-20 hurling team captain 2024	Succeeded by Incumbent
