= 2025 Fitzgibbon Cup =

Irish collegiate hurling tournament

- Dates: 15 January - 15 February 2025
- Teams: 11
- Sponsor: Electric Ireland
- Champions: University of Limerick (9th title); Colin Coughlan (captain); Brian Ryan (manager)
- Runners-up: DCU Dóchas Éireann; Pádraic Moylan (captain); Paul Carney (manager)

Tournament statistics
- Matches played: 19
- Goals scored: 44 (2.32 per match)
- Points scored: 736 (38.74 per match)
- Top scorer(s): Gearóid O'Connor (0-37)

The 2025 Fitzgibbon Cup was the 108th staging of the Fitzgibbon Cup since its establishment by the Gaelic Athletic Association in 1912. The draw for the group stage fixtures took place on 11 December 2024. The competition ran from 15 January to 15 February 2025.

Mary Immaculate College were the defending champions, however, they were beaten by DCU Dóchas Éireann in the quarter-finals.

The final was played on 15 February 2025 at the Connacht Centre of Excellence in Bekan, between University of Limerick and DCU Dóchas Éireann, in what was their second meeting in the final overall and a first meeting in seven years. University of Limerick won the match by 0–23 to 1–15 to claim their ninth Fitzgibbon Cup title overall and a third title in four years.

University of Limerick's Gearóid O'Connor was the top scorer with 0-37.

== Team changes ==
=== From Fitzgibbon Cup ===
Regraded to the Ryan Cup

- SETU Carlow

== Group A ==
=== Group A table ===
Advance to knockout stage

Team	Matches				Score			Pts
Team	Pld	W	D	L	For	Against	Diff	Pts
University of Limerick	3	3	0	0	92	60	32	6
Mary Immaculate College	3	2	0	1	57	61	-4	4
SETU Waterford	3	1	0	2	38	53	-15	2
ATU Galway	3	0	0	3	45	28	-17	0

=== Group A results ===
15 January 2025 Round 1	University of Limerick	3-24 - 1-17	SETU Waterford	UL Grounds
	G O’Connor 0-11 (0-7 frees); J Leahy 2-2; A O’Connor 0-3; A English 1-0; A Morgan, B O’Sullivan, P O’Donovan, C O’Meara, P Crotty, D Hanniffy, S Rynne 0-1 each.	Report	R Halloran 1-10 (0-6 frees, 0-1 ’65); S Walsh 0-3; W Beresford 0-2; C Keane, J Foley 0-1 each.

15 January 2025 Round 1	ATU Galway	2-14 - 0-22	Mary Immaculate College	Ballyloughnane Grounds
	D Donohue 0-8 (8f); N Earner and D Shaughnessy 1-0 each; K Cooney (2sl) and O Lohan 0-2 each; J Cooney and D McGlynn 0-1 each.	Report	O O’Farrell 0-5 (3f); S Meehan (2f) and C Hennessy 0-3 each; S O’Brien (1f), D McLaughlin and J Ryan 0-2 each; C Scully, E Lawless, D Cahill, D Conway and R O’Connor 0-1 each.

22 January 2025 Round 2	University of Limerick	3-27 - 3-16	ATU Galway	UL Grounds
	J Leahy 1-6; B O’Sullivan, G O’Connor (0-3f) 0-5 each; A English 0-4; A O’Connor 1-1; P O’Donovan 1-0; C O’Meara 0-3; S O’Hanlon, K Doyle, D Hanniffy 0-1 each.	Report	N Earner 2-2; K Cooney 0-7 (0-6f); D Dunne 1-1; O Lohan 0-2; D Shaughnessy, J Cooney (free), D Murphy, D Donohue 0-1 each.

22 January 2025 Round 2	SETU Waterford	0-18 - 1-17	Mary Immaculate College	SETU Sports Campus
	S Walsh (0-12, 9fs), C King (0-3), C Keane, J Foley (0-1 each).	Report	S O'Brien (1-8, 7fs), C Scully (0-4), D Cahill (0-2), O O'Farrell, R O'Connor (0-1 each).

29 January 2024 Round 3	Mary Immaculate College	0-15 - 0-23	University of Limerick	MICL Grounds
	C Scully 0-5 (0-4f); O O'Farrell 0-4 (0-2f); J Ryan, D McLaughlin, D Cahill (free), R Power, R O'Connor, J Quilty (free) 0-1 each.	Report	G O’Connor 0-6 (0-3f); J Leahy, P Crotty 0-4; S O’Hanlon 0-3; D Hanniffy 0-2; B O'Sullivan, S Rynne, C O’Meara, M Fitzgerald 0-1 each

29 January 2024 Round 3	SETU Waterford	w/o - scr.	ATU Galway

== Group B ==
=== Group B table ===
Advance to knockout stage

Team	Matches				Score			Pts
Team	Pld	W	D	L	For	Against	Diff	Pts
University College Cork	3	3	0	0	79	68	11	6
MTU Cork	3	2	0	1	71	59	12	4
University of Galway	3	1	0	2	82	60	22	2
University College Dublin	3	0	0	3	53	98	-45	0

=== Group B results ===
15 January 2025 Round 1	University College Cork	0-29 - 1-20	University College Dublin	The Mardyke
	B Keating, B Cunningham (0-2 f, 0-1 65) 0-5 each, W Buckley 0-4, D Flynn, M Mullaney 0-3 each, T Wilk, D Stakelum 0-2 each, F Coleman, E Twomey, J Dwyer, P McGarry, E O’Leary 0-1 each.	Report	D Ó Dulaing 0-6 (0-4 f), D Williams 0-4 (0-1 f), L Connellan 1-1, D Purcell, C Ó Cathasaigh, J Duggan 0-2 each, E Ryan, B Scanlon, P McDonald 0-1 each.

16 January 2025 Round 1	University of Galway	1-15 - 1-18	MTU Cork	Dangan Grounds
	N Collins (0-8, 0-7f), L Collins (1-4), G Thomas (0-1), C Molloy (0-1), D Bourke (0-1).	Report	A Connolly (0-8, 0-5f, 0-1 65), A Walsh (1-1), C Joyce (0-3, 0-1 65), D Healy (0-2), B Lynch (0-2), M Mullins (0-1), S Walsh (0-1)

22 January 2025 Round 2	University College Cork	1-24 - 2-19	University of Galway	The Mardyke
	B Cunningham (0-9, 2 frees); D Stakelum (1-3); B Keating, D Flynn (0-3 each); W Buckley (0-2); F Coleman, J Dwyer, P McGarry, D Hogan (0-1 each).	Report	N Collins (0-10, 9 frees); L Collins (2-0); D Bourke, D Comar, C Molloy (0-2 each); I McGlynn, M Gill, T Killeen (0-1 each).

23 January 2025 Round 2	University College Dublin	1-15 - 3-21	MTU Cork	Belfield Grounds
	D Williams (1-7, 0-5 frees); B Scanlon (0-3); L Connellan (0-2); C O Cathasaigh, D Lee, C Kearney (0-1 each).	Report	A Connolly (1-5, 0-4 frees); D Healy (0-5); S Walsh (0-4); David O'Sullivan, M Finn (1-0 each); J Cahalane, B Lynch, R McCarthy (0-2 each); Darragh O'Sullivan (0-1).

29 January 2025 Round 3	University of Galway	4-27 - 0-12	University College Dublin	Dangan Grounds
	R Davitt (1-5), I McGlynn (1-2), M Tarpey (1-1), D Comar (0-4), N Collins (0-4), K Hanrahan (1-0), C Molloy (0-2), L Leen (0-2), S Dunford (0-2), J Ryan (0-1), G Thomas (0-1).	Report	B Scanlon (0-7), S Barron (0-1, F Mahony (0-1), C Kearney (0-1), D Lee (0-1), C O’ Toole (0-1).

29 January 2025 Round 3	MTU Cork	0-20 - 0-23	University College Cork	MTU Cork Grounds
	J Cahalane 0-9 (7 frees); S Walsh 0-3; D Healy, A Walsh 0-2 each; Darragh O’Sullivan, M Mullins, David O’Sullivan, R McCarthy 0-1 each.	Report	B Cunningham 0-12 (9 frees, 1 65); W Buckley, M Mullaney, P McGarry 0-2 each; Cathal McCarthy, B Keating, D Hogan, F Coleman, E O’Leary 0-1 each.

== Group C ==
=== Group C table ===
Advance to knockout stage

Team	Matches				Score			Pts
Team	Pld	W	D	L	For	Against	Diff	Pts
TUS Midwest	2	1	1	0	47	35	12	3
DCU Dóchas Éireann	2	1	1	0	49	44	5	3
Maynooth University	2	0	0	2	37	54	-17	0

=== Group C results ===
16 January 2025 Round 1	TUS Midwest	1-18 - 1-18	DCU Dóchas Éireann	TUS Midwest Grounds
	K Shelly 0-8 (7f), P McCormack 1-2, N O’Farrell 0-4, P Donnellan 0-2 (1 ’65), D Casey and S Canning 0-1 each.	Report	C Dunne 0-8 (5f, 1 ’65), J Carroll 1-2, S Bourke and D Carley 0-2 each, B Reid, C Kehoe, D Shirley and S Byrne 0-1 each.

23 January 2025 Round 2	DCU Dóchas Éireann	2-22 - 2-17	Maynooth University	DCU Sportsgrounds
	C Dunne (0-7, 5f), C Boran (1-1), C Beirne (0-4), S Bourke (1-0), D Carley, J Flanagan (0-2 each), P Langton, B Reid, D Shirley, C Spain, D Walsh, P Clarke (0-1 each).	Report	C Fogarty (1-5, 1-0 pen, 0-3f), C Hackett (1-2), E Cunneen (0-3), N Holland (0-2, 2f), T Maher (0-2), F Hogan, D Queally, H Shine (0-1 each).

30 January 2025 Round 3	Maynooth University	0-14 - 0-26	TUS Midwest	Maynooth University North Campus
	C Fogarty 0-8 (7fs, 1x65), C Hackett 0-3, H Shine 0-2 (2fs), E Cunneen 0-1.	Report	K Shelly 0-13 (13fs), N O’Farrell 0-5, P McCormack 0-2, C O’Dwyer 0-2; R Doyle 0-2; S Canning 0-1, D Tynan 0-1.

== Knockout stage ==
=== Quarter-finals ===
5 February 2025 Quarter-final	DCU Dóchas Éireann	1-20 - 1-18	Mary Immaculate College	DCU Sportsgrounds
	S Bourke 1-1 (0-1f); J Flanagan (2f), D Shirley 0-4 each; C Dunne 0-3 (3f); C Spain (1 sideline), C Beirne 0-2 each; B Reid, D Carley, C Boran, P Clarke 0-1 apiece.	Report	S O’Brien 0-11 (7f, 1 ’65); F McDonagh 1-0; J Quilty 0-2; R Power, R O’Connor, D McLoughlin, D Cahill, J Caesar 0-1 apiece.

6 February 2025 Quarter-final	TUS Midwest	1-17 - 4-18	MTU Cork	TUS Midwest Grounds
	K Shelly 1-12 (0-10 f, 1-0 pen), N O’Farrell 0-2, S Canning, P McCormack, J Mahon (f) 0-1 each.	Report	A Walsh 3-1, A Connolly 0-7 (0-5 f), J Cahalane 1-3, M Finn, D O’Sullivan 0-2 each, D Healy, R McCarthy, S Fitzgerald 0-1 each.

=== Semi-finals ===
11 February 2025 Semi-final	University College Cork	1-16 - 1-20	DCU Dóchas Éireann	SETU Carlow Grounds
	D Flynn 0-4 (0-2 f), F Coleman 1-1, E Twomey, W Buckley 0-3 each, D Stakelum, M Mullaney, B Keating, L Elliott, P McGarry 0-1 each.	Report	D Walsh 0-6 (0-5 f, 0-1 65), D Shirley 1-2, J Flanagan 0-5, C Boran 0-2, P Langton, S Gallagher, S Bourke, B Reid, D Carley 0-1 each.

11 February 2025 Semi-final	University of Limerick	1-28 - 0-10	MTU Cork	Mallow GAA Complex
	C O’Meara 1-2; G O’Connor 0-5 (3 frees); C Coughlan, J Leahy 0-4 each; B O’Sullivan 0-3; A English, A O’Connor, S Rynne, S O’Hanlon 0-2 each; K Doyle, D Hannify 0-1 each.	Report	J Cahalane 0-4 (4 frees); A Walsh 0-2; R Walsh, A Connolly (65), S Walsh, D Healy 0-1 each.

=== Final ===
15 February 2025 Final	DCU Dóchas Éireann	1-15 - 0-23	University of Limerick	Connacht Centre of Excellence
	D Walsh 0-8 (0-7f), C Beirne 1-1, P Clarke 0-2, C Boran 0-2, J Flanagan 0-1, D Carley 0-1.	Report	G O’Connor 0-10 (0-6f), A English 0-2, J Leahy 0-2, S O‘Hanlon 0-2, J Connealy 0-1, K Doyle 0-1, M Fitzgerald 0-1, B O’Sullivan 0-1, A O’Connor 0-1, C O’Neill 0-1, D Hanniffy 0-1.	Referee: J Murphy (Limerick)

== Statistics ==
=== Top scorers ===
Rank	Player	County	Tally	Total	Matches	Average
`1	Gearóid O'Connor	University of Limerick	0-37	37	5	7.40
2	Kyle Shelly	TUS Midwest	1-33	36	3	12.00
3	Jack Leahy	University of Limerick	3-18	27	5	5.40
4	Ben Cunningham	University College Cork	0-26	26	3	8.66
5	Shane O'Brien	Mary Immaculate College	1-21	24	3	8.00
5	Alan Connolly	MTU Cork	1-21	24	4	6.00
7	Niall Collins	University of Galway	0-22	22	3	7.33
8	Jack Cahalane	MTU Cork	1-18	21	5	4.20
9	Alan Walsh	MTU Cork	4-06	18	5	3.60
9	Cillian Dunne	DCU Dóchas Éireann	0-18	18	5	3.60
