= Pádraic Moylan =

Irish hurler

Personal information
- Native name: Pádraic Ó Maoileáin (Irish)
- Born: 2002 (age 23–24) Kilkenny, Ireland
- Occupation: Student
- Height: 6 ft 4 in (193 cm)

Sport
- Sport: Hurling
- Position: Centre-back
Club
- Years: Club
- Dicksboro
Club titles
- Kilkenny titles: 0
College
- Years: College
- DCU Dóchas Éireann
College titles
- Fitzgibbon titles: 0
Inter-county*
Years	County	Apps (scores)
2023-	Kilkenny	0 (0-00)
Inter-county titles
- Leinster titles: 0
- All-Irelands: 0
- NHL: 0
- All Stars: 0
- *Inter County team apps and scores correct as of 21:25, 6 February 2022.

Pádraic Moylan (born 2002) is an Irish hurler. At club level he plays with Dicksboro and at inter-county level with the Kilkenny senior hurling team.

== Career ==
Moylan first played hurling at juvenile and underage levels with the Dicksboro club, while also playing as a schoolboy with St. Kieran's College. He won a Kilkenny MHC title with Dicksboro in 2019. Moylan has also lined out with DCU Dóchas Éireann in the Fitzgibbon Cup.

Moylan first appeared on the inter-county scene as a member of the Kilkenny minor hurling team that lost the 2018 All-Ireland minor final to Galway. He was also part of the minor team that lost the 2019 All-Ireland minor final to Galway. Moylan subsequently progressed to the under-20 team and was team captain when Kilkenny beat Limerick in the 2022 All-Ireland under-20 final.

Moylan first played for the senior team during the 2023 Walsh Cup.

== Honours ==
Dicksboro

- Kilkenny Minor Hurling Championship: 2019

Kilkenny

- All-Ireland Under-20 Hurling Championship: 2022 (c)
- Leinster Under-20 Hurling Championship: 2022 (c)

Sporting positions
Preceded by Shane Staunton	Kilkenny under-20 hurling team captain 2022	Succeeded by Luke Connellan
Achievements
Preceded by Cormac O'Brien	All-Ireland Under-20 Hurling Final winning captain 2022	Succeeded by Micheál Mullins
