= Billy Drennan =

Irish hurler

Personal information
- Native name: Liam Ó Draighneáin (Irish)
- Born: 29 April 2003 (age 23) Galmoy, County Kilkenny, Ireland
- Occupation: Student
- Height: 6 ft 2 in (188 cm)

Sport
- Sport: Hurling
- Position: Full-forward
Club
- Years: Club
- Galmoy
Club titles
- Kilkenny titles: 0
College
- Years: College
- Maynooth University
College titles
- Fitzgibbon titles: 0
Inter-county*
Years	County	Apps (scores)
2023-2025	Kilkenny	8 (1-10)
Inter-county titles
- Leinster titles: 3
- All-Irelands: 0
- NHL: 0
- All Stars: 0
- *Inter County team apps and scores correct as of 21:37, 10 Juen 2025.

Billy Drennan (born 29 April 2003) is an Irish hurler. At club level he plays with Galmoy and at inter-county level with the Kilkenny senior hurling team.

== Career ==
Drennan first played hurling at juvenile and underage levels with the Galmoy club, while also playing as a schoolboy with CBS Kilkenny in the Leinster PPS SAHC. He has also lined out with Maynooth University in the Fitzgibbon Cup.

Drennan first appeared on the inter-county scene as a member of the Kilkenny minor hurling team that lost the 2019 All-Ireland minor final to Galway. He was the championship's top scorer with 2-66. Brennan was again part of the minor team that lost the 2020 All-Ireland minor final to Galway. He immediately progressed to the under-20 team and was man of the match when Kilkenny beat Limerick in the 2022 All-Ireland under-20 final.

Drennan first played for the senior team during the 2023 Walsh Cup.

== Career statistics ==
As of 8 June 2025

Team	Year	National League			Leinster		All-Ireland		Total	
Team	Year	Division	Apps	Score	Apps	Score	Apps	Score	Apps	Score
Kilkenny Minor	2019	—			5	1-36	4	1-30	9	2-66
Kilkenny Minor	2020	—			2	0-27	1	1-06	3	1-33
Kilkenny Minor	Total	—			7	1-63	5	2-36	12	3-99
Kilkenny U20	2021	—			2	0-01	—		2	0-01
Kilkenny U20	2022	—			3	1-31	1	0-09	4	1-40
Kilkenny U20	2023	—			1	2-12	—		1	2-12
Kilkenny U20	Total	—			6	3-44	1	0-09	7	2-53
Kilkenny	2023	Division 1B	7	2-70	3	0-02	0	0-00	10	2-72
Kilkenny	2024	Division 1A	6	2-21	2	1-06	0	0-00	8	3-27
Kilkenny	2025	Division 1A	4	0-08	3	0-02	0	0-00	7	0-10
Kilkenny	Total		17	4-99	8	1-10	0	0-00	25	5-109
Career total			17	4-99	21	5-117	6	2-45	44	11-261

== Honours ==
Kilkenny

- Leinster Senior Hurling Championship: 2023, 2024, 2025
- All-Ireland Under-20 Hurling Championship: 2022
- Leinster Under-20 Hurling Championship: 2022
- Leinster Minor Hurling Championship: 2020
