= Kyle Shelly =

Irish Gaelic footballer (born 2002)

Personal information
- Born: 2002 (age 23–24) Littleton; County Tipperary, Ireland
- Occupation: Student

Sport
- Sport: Gaelic football
- Position: Full-forward
Club
- Years: Club
- 2020-present: Moycarkey-Borris
Club titles
- Tipperary titles: 0
College
- Years: College
- 2021-2025: TUS Midwest
College titles
- Fitzgibbon titles: 0
Inter-county
- Years: County
- 2024-: Tipperary
Inter-county titles
- Munster titles: 0
- All-Irelands: 0
- NHL: 0
- All Stars: 0

Kyle Shelly (born 2002) is an Irish hurler and Gaelic footballer. At club level he plays with Moycarkey-Borris and at inter-county level with the Tipperary senior football team.

== Career ==
Shelly first played Gaelic football hurling at juvenile and underage levels with the Moycarkey-Borris club. He won a Tipperary MAHC medal in 2018, before later claiming a Tipperary U21AHC title in 2021. By that stage he had also joined the club's top adult teams as a dual player. Shelly has also lined out with TUS Midwest in the Fitzgibbon Cup.

Shelly first appeared on the inter-county scene with Tipperary as a dual player at minor level in 2019. He later progressed to the Tipperary under-20 hurling team and was top scorer during their 2022 campaign. Shelly was drafted onto the Tipperary senior football team in 2024.

== Honours ==
Moycarkey-Borris

- Tipperary Under-21 A Hurling Championship: 2021
- Tipperary Minor A Hurling Championship: 2018
