= 2022 All-Ireland Under-20 Hurling Championship final =

2022 All-Ireland Under-20 Hurling Championship Final
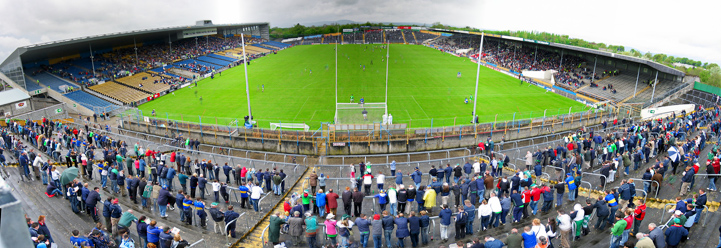
- Event: 2022 All-Ireland Under-20 Hurling Championship
Kilkenny	Limerick
0-19	0-18
- Date: 22 May 2022
- Venue: FBD Semple Stadium, Thurles
- Man of the Match: Billy Drennan
- Referee: Thomas Walsh (Waterford)
- Attendance: 27,131

The 2022 All-Ireland Under-20 Hurling Championship final was a hurling match that was played on 22 May 2022 to determine the winners of the 2022 All-Ireland Under-20 Hurling Championship, the 59th season of the All-Ireland Under-20 Hurling Championship, a tournament organised by the Gaelic Athletic Association for the champion teams of Leinster and Munster. The final was contested by Kilkenny of Leinster and Limerick of Munster.

The All-Ireland final between Kilkenny and Limerick was the second All-Ireland final meeting between the two teams and a first since 2017. Cork were hoping to claim a first title since 2008, while Limerick were hoping to claim their first title since 2017.

In a low scoring first half both defences were on top limiting their markers to long range efforts. On the twenty minute mark Paddy Langton scored a unique point when his long range effort was batted back into play by Conor Hanley-Clarke in the Limerick goal, however, the new smart sliotar was deemed to have just edged between the posts before it was tipped back into play. Kilkenny goalkeeper Aidan Tallis struck over the last score of the half to edge Kilkenny in front at the break.

Limerick managed to find space where they struggled in the first half hour. Kilkenny had two huge goal chances on forty minutes with Ian Byrne and Billy Drennan both forcing two full stretch saves from Hanley-Clarke in a matter of moments. Limerick looked to make sure they kept with Kilkenny as they trailed by two points with minutes remaining. They managed to get back within one and with the last puck of the game Colin Coughlan had the chance to send the game to extra time but his effort drifted to the left and wide.

Kilkenny's All-Ireland victory was their first in 14 years. The win gave them their 12th All-Ireland title overall and put them one behind Cork on the all-time roll of honour.

== Match ==
=== Details ===
22 May 2022
13:30

Kilkenny	0-19 - 0-18	Limerick
B Drennan 0-9 (0-3f, 0-1 65), T Clifford 0-3, I Byrne 0-2, D Walsh 0-2, A Tallis 0-1 (0-1f), P Langton 0-1, A Hickey 0-1		A O’Connor 0-10 (0-7f), A English 0-2, P O’Donovan 0-2, P Kirby 0-1, E Stokes 0-1, C Coughlan 0-1, S O’Brien 0-1

FBD Semple Stadium
Attendance: 27,131
Referee: T Walsh (Waterford)
