= 2023 Walsh Cup =

Tournament details
- Province: Leinster, Ulster, Connacht
- Year: 2023
- Sponsor: Bord na Móna
- Date: 7 January – 4 February 2023
- Teams: 8
- Defending champions: Dublin

Winners
- Champions: Galway (4th win)
- Manager: Henry Shefflin
- Captain: Daithí Burke

Runners-up
- Runners-up: Wexford
- Manager: Darragh Egan
- Captain: Damien Reck

Other
- Matches played: 13

The 2023 Walsh Cup was an early-season inter-county hurling competition based in the Irish province of Leinster.

Eight county teams competed – six from Leinster (Dublin, Kilkenny, Laois, Offaly, Westmeath, Wexford); Galway from Connacht; and Antrim from Ulster. Five other teams from Leinster and Ulster played in the second-ranked 2023 Kehoe Cup.

It took place in January and February 2023. The new floodlights at Wexford Park were first used on 21 January 2023 for the Wexford–Kilkenny game. Galway were the winners, defeating Wexford in the final.

== Competition format ==
The teams are drawn into two groups of four teams. Each team plays the other teams in their group once, earning 2 points for a win and 1 for a draw. The group winners advance to the final.

== Results ==
=== Group A ===
Pos	Team	Pld	W	D	L	PF	PA	PD	Pts	Qualification
1	Galway	3	3	0	0	95	56	+39	6	Advance to final
2	Dublin	3	2	0	1	73	67	+6	4	
3	Westmeath	3	1	0	2	50	73	−23	2	
4	Antrim	3	0	0	3	62	84	−22	0	

Updated to match(es) played on 22 January 2023. Source: Leinster GAA

==== Group A results ====
7 January 2023 Round 1	Dublin	3-26 - 2-22	Antrim	Dublin
				Stadium: Parnell Park

8 January 2023 Round 1	Galway	3-27 - 0-20	Westmeath	Ballinasloe
				Stadium: Duggan Park

14 January 2023 Round 2	Westmeath	0-15 - 0-13	Antrim	Abbotstown
				Stadium: GAA Centre of Excellence

14 January 2023 Round 2	Dublin	0-15 - 1-21	Galway	Dublin
				Stadium: Parnell Park

21 January 2023 Round 3	Antrim	2-15 - 1-31	Galway	Darver Centre of Excellence

22 January 2023 Round 3	Westmeath	0-15 - 1-20	Dublin	Kinnegad

=== Group B ===
Pos	Team	Pld	W	D	L	PF	PA	PD	Pts	Qualification
1	Wexford	3	2	0	1	69	64	+5	4 (Note: Wexford are ranked ahead of Kilkenny as they won the head-to-head game between the teams.)	Advance to final
2	Kilkenny	3	2	0	1	89	76	+13	4	
3	Offaly	3	1	0	2	68	74	−6	2 (Note: Offaly are ranked ahead of Laois as they won the head-to-head game between the teams.)	
4	Laois	3	1	0	2	73	85	−12	2	

Updated to match(es) played on 22 January 2023. Source: Leinster GAA

==== Group B results ====
8 January 2023 Round 1	Laois	0-20 - 0-18	Wexford	Mountrath
				Stadium: St Fintan's

8 January 2023 Round 1	Kilkenny	2-19 - 0-21	Offaly	Callan
				Stadium: John Locke Park

15 January 2023 Round 2	Laois	2-21 - 3-31	Kilkenny	Rathdowney

15 January 2023 Round 2	Offaly	2-14 - 1-20	Wexford	Birr
				Stadium: St. Brendan's Park

21 January 2023 Round 3	Wexford	1-25 - 2-18	Kilkenny	Wexford
				Stadium: Wexford Park

22 January 2023 Round 3	Offaly	2-21 - 1-23	Laois	Tullamore
				Stadium: O'Connor Park

=== Final ===
TG4

4 February 2023
17:15 WET (UTC±00:00)
Final

Report

Wexford	0-15 (15) – (23) 0-23	Galway
(HT: 0-10 – 0-10)
Pts: Conor McDonald 4 (3fs), Charlie McGuckin 3, Damien Reck 2, Cathal Dunbar 2, Mikie Dwyer 1, Liam Ryan 1, Simon Donohoe 1, Kevin Foley 1		Pts: Evan Niland 10 (9fs, 1 ’65), Conor Whelan 2, Liam Collins 2, Donal O’Shea 1, Jarlath Mannion 1, Darren Morrissey 1, Tiernan Killeen 1, Tom Monaghan 1, Brian Concannon 1, Seán Linnane 1, Jason Flynn 1, Ronan Murphy 1

Wexford Park, Wexford
Referee: John Keenan (Wicklow)
Attendance: 8,200

- This game is also part of the 2023 National Hurling League.
