= 2023 National Hurling League =

2023 hurling tournament in Ireland and England

League details
- Dates: 4 February – 9 April 2023
- Teams: 35

League champions
- Winners: Limerick (14th win)
- Captain: Cian Lynch
- Manager: John Kiely

League runners-up
- Runners-up: Kilkenny
- Captain: Eoin Cody
- Manager: Derek Lyng

Other division winners
- Division 2A: Offaly
- Division 2B: Meath
- Division 3A: Roscommon
- Division 3B: Cavan

The 2023 National Hurling League, known for sponsorship reasons as the Allianz Hurling League, was the 92nd season of the National Hurling League, an annual hurling competition held in Ireland for county teams. Three English county teams also feature. Waterford were the title holders.

It took place between 4 February and 9 April.

On 9 April, Limerick won the National Hurling League for the fourteenth time after a 2–20 to 0–15 win against Kilkenny in the final.

== Format ==
League structure

Thirty-five teams compete in the 2023 NHL –

- twelve teams organised in two six-team groups of approximately equal strength in Division 1
- six teams in Divisions 2A, 2B and 3A
- five teams in Division 3B.

All thirty-two county teams from Ireland take part. London, Lancashire and Warwickshire complete the lineup.

Teams by Province and Division
Province	Div 1	Div 2A	Div 2B	Div 3A	Div 3B	Total
Connacht	1	0	1	2	1	5
Leinster	5	3	2	1	1	12
Munster	5	1	0	0	0	6
Ulster	1	2	2	3	1	9
Britain	0	0	1	0	2	3
Total	12	6	6	6	5	35

Each team plays all the other teams in their group or division once, either home or away. Two points are awarded for a win, and one for a draw.

Tie-breaker

- If only two teams are level on league points, the team that won the head-to-head match is ranked ahead. If this game was a draw, score difference (total scored minus total conceded in all games) is used to rank the teams.
- If three or more teams are level on league points, score difference is used to rank the teams.

Finals, promotions and relegations

Division 1

- The top two teams in each group play in the NHL semi-finals and final.
- The bottom team in each group meet in a relegation play-off, with the losers being relegated to Division 2A

Division 2A

- Second and third place meet in the Division 2A semi-final
- The first-placed team plays the semi-final winner in the Division 2A final, with the winners being promoted to Division 1
- The bottom team is relegated to Division 2B

Division 2B

- Second and third place meet in the Division 2B semi-final
- The first-placed team plays the semi-final winner in the Division 2B final, with the winners being promoted to Division 2A
- The bottom two teams meet in a relegation play-off, with the losers being relegated to Division 3A

Division 3A

- Second and third place meet in the Division 3A semi-final
- The first-placed team plays the semi-final winner in the Division 3A final, with the winners being promoted to Division 2B
- The bottom team is relegated to Division 3B

Division 3B

- Second and third place meet in the Division 3B semi-final
- The first-placed team plays the semi-final winner in the Division 3B final, with the winners being promoted to Division 3A

== Division 1 ==
Locations of the 2023 NHL Division 1 teams.
Red: Group A; Green: Group B.

=== Division 1 Format ===
The top twelve teams compete in Division 1 in two six-team groups of approximately equal strength. This group structure was introduced in 2020; the groups were redrawn for 2022 and 2023.

Each team play all the other teams in their group once. Two points are awarded for a win and one for a draw. The top two teams in each group qualifies for the NHL semi-finals.

=== Division 1 Group A Table ===
NHL semi-finals Relegation play-off

Team	Pld	W	D	L	F	A	Diff	Pts
Cork	5	4	1	0	130	116	14	9
Limerick	5	4	0	1	132	99	33	8
Galway	5	3	0	2	139	112	27	6
Clare	5	2	1	2	152	116	36	5
Wexford	5	1	0	4	98	130	-32	2
Westmeath	5	0	0	5	86	164	-78	0

=== Division 1 Group A Rounds 1 to 5 ===
==== Division 1 Group A Round 1 ====
- This game is also the final of the 2023 Walsh Cup.

4 February 2023; 17:00; Round 1	Wexford	0-15 (15) - (23) 0-23	Galway	Chadwicks Wexford Park; Attendance: 8,200; Referee: J Keenan (Wicklow)
4 February 2023; 17:00; Round 1	C McDonald 0-4 (4fs); C McGuckin 0-3; D Reck 0-2 (1f); C Dunbar 0-2; M Dwyer, S Donohoe, K Foley, L Ryan 0-1 each.	Report Report	E Niland 0-10 (8fs, 2 ’65s); C Whelan, L Collins 0-2 each; T Killeen, J Mannion, D O’Shea, D Morrissey, T Monaghan, B Concannon, S Linnane, J Flynn, R Murphy 0-1 each.	Chadwicks Wexford Park; Attendance: 8,200; Referee: J Keenan (Wicklow)

4 February 2023; 19:30; Round 1	Cork	2-17 (23) - (22) 0-22	Limerick	Páirc Uí Chaoimh; Attendance: 19,516; Referee: F Horgan (Tipperary)
4 February 2023; 19:30; Round 1	P Horgan 0-10 (0-5 f, 0-1 65), R O’Flynn 1-1, D Dalton 1-0, E Downey, C Joyce, L Meade, B Roche, C Lehane, S Kingston 0-1 each.	Report Report	D Reidy 0-8 (0-7 f, 0-1 65), G Hegarty 0-3, A English, C Coughlan 0-2 each, S Flanagan, T Morrissey, D Hannon, B Murphy, D O’Donovan, C Barry, D Ó Dálaigh 0-1 each.	Páirc Uí Chaoimh; Attendance: 19,516; Referee: F Horgan (Tipperary)

5 February 2023; 14:00; Round 1	Clare	4-27 (39) - (14) 0-14	Westmeath	Cusack Park; Attendance: 3,523; Referee: P O'Dwyer (Carlow)
5 February 2023; 14:00; Round 1	A McCarthy (0-10, 5f), M Rodgers (2-2), I Galvin (1-3), D Conroy (0-5), A Shanagher (1-0), D Fitzgerald (0-3), B O’Connell (0-1), D Ryan (0-1), G O’Grady (0-1), S Morey (0-1).	Report	K Doyle (0-8, 4f, 1 ‘65), C Doyle (0-2), J Boyle (0-1), J Galvin (0-1s), R Greville (0-1), D Glennon (0-1).	Cusack Park; Attendance: 3,523; Referee: P O'Dwyer (Carlow)

==== Division 1 Group A Round 2 ====
11 February 2023; 19:00; Round 2	Limerick	1-27 (30) - (24) 2-18	Clare	TUS Gaelic Grounds; Attendance: 15,521; Referee: J Owens (Wexford)
11 February 2023; 19:00; Round 2	M Houlihan 0-12 (0-8 f), D O'Dalaigh 1-0, K Hayes 0-3, P Casey 0-3, S O'Brien 0-2, G Hegarty 0-2, T Morrisey 0-2, A English 0-2, C Lynch 0-1		A McCarthy 0-13 (0-10 f), D Reidy 1-2, I Galvin 1-0, S Morey 0-1, D Ryan 0-1, D Fitzgerald 0-1	TUS Gaelic Grounds; Attendance: 15,521; Referee: J Owens (Wexford)

12 February 2023; 14:00; Round 2	Westmeath	1-15 (18) - (29) 2-23	Wexford	TEG Cusack Park; Referee: S Cleere (Kilkenny)
12 February 2023; 14:00; Round 2	K Doyle 0-9 (8f), O McCabe 1-0, N O’Brien 0-2, S McGovern, J Boyle, D Glennon, R Greville 0-1 each.	Report	R Banville 1-3 (3f); C McDonald 1-2; L Chin 0-5 (4f); C Hearne 0-3; C McGuckin, C Dunbar, R Higgins, C Byrne Dunbar 0-2 each; I Carty, L Óg McGovern 0-1 each. Westmeath:	TEG Cusack Park; Referee: S Cleere (Kilkenny)

12 February 2023; 14:00; Round 2	Galway	3-22 (31) - (36) 4-24	Cork	Pearse Stadium; Attendance: 8,872; Referee: J Murphy (Limerick)
12 February 2023; 14:00; Round 2	E Niland 0-11 (0-8 f), M McManus 1-3, K Cooney 1-1, B Concannon 1-0, C Whelan 0-2 C Fahy, P Mannion, C Mannion, L Collins (f) J Flynn 0-1.	Report	C Lehane 2-3, D Dalton 0-8 (0-2 f), S Twomey 2-0, S Kingston 0-6 (0-4 f), S Barrett 0-4, C Beausang, C Cahalane, B Hayes 0-1 each.	Pearse Stadium; Attendance: 8,872; Referee: J Murphy (Limerick)

==== Division 1 Group A Round 3 ====
26 February 2023; 13:45; Round 3	Cork	2-21 (27) - (21) 0-21	Westmeath	Páirc Uí Chaoimh; Attendance: 7,347; Referee: M Kennedy (Tipperary)
26 February 2023; 13:45; Round 3	S Kingston 1-7 (0-6 frees), S Barrett 1-2, C Cahalane 0-3, B Hayes, P Power 0-2 each, C O’Brien, E Twomey, C Cormack, T O’Connell, B Cunningham 0-1 each.	Report	K Doyle 0-13 (0-11 frees), J Galvin (0-1 sideline), C Doyle (0-2 frees) 0-2 each, D Glennon, S McGovern, D Clinton (0-1 free), R Greville 0-1 each.	Páirc Uí Chaoimh; Attendance: 7,347; Referee: M Kennedy (Tipperary)

26 February 2023; 13:45; Round 3	Wexford	1-18 (21) - (43) 6-25	Clare	Chadwicks Wexford Park; Attendance: 6,840; Referee: T Walsh (Waterford)
26 February 2023; 13:45; Round 3	R Banville 0-8 (6 frees, 2 ‘65s), C McDonald 1-0, C Dunbar 0-3, C McGuckin 0-2, C Foley, R Higgins, D Reck, C Hearne, I Carty 0-1 each.	Report	A McCarthy 1-10 (0-6 frees), D Reidy 2-1, T Kelly 1-2, P Duggan 1-1, D Fitzgerald 0-3, M Rodgers 1-0, I Galvin 0-2, R Taylor, C Malone, D Ryan, A Hogan, E Foudy (free), D Conroy 0-1 each.	Chadwicks Wexford Park; Attendance: 6,840; Referee: T Walsh (Waterford)

26 February 2023; 14:30; Round 3	Galway	0-19 (19) - (24) 0-24	Limerick	Pearse Stadium; Attendance: 12,246; Referee: S Stack (Dublin)
26 February 2023; 14:30; Round 3	C Cooney 0-12 (9fs), T Monaghan 0-3, K Cooney 0-2, S Linnane and C Fahy 0-1 each.	Report	T Morrissey 0-8 (3fs), M Houlihan 0-4 (4fs), C Lynch and K Hayes 0-3 each, S O’Brien and P Casey 0-2 each, S Flanagan and D O Dalaigh 0-1 each.	Pearse Stadium; Attendance: 12,246; Referee: S Stack (Dublin)

==== Division 1 Group A Round 4 ====
12 March 2023; 13:45; Round 4	Clare	0-22 (22) - (27) 1-24	Galway	Cusack Park; Attendance: 6,190; Referee: C Lyons (Cork)
12 March 2023; 13:45; Round 4	A McCarthy 0-7 (6fs), D Fitzgerald 0-4, D Reidy 0-3, I Galvin 0-2, R Taylor, C Malone, P Duggan, C Galvin, R Mounsey and S Morey 0-1 each.	Report	E Niland 0-9 (5fs, 1’65), C Cooney 0-5, C Whelan 1-0, D Burke, K Cooney and T Monaghan 0-2 each, R Glennon, B Concannon, J Cooney and S Linnane 0-1 each.	Cusack Park; Attendance: 6,190; Referee: C Lyons (Cork)

12 March 2023; 14:00; Round 4	Westmeath	1-15 (18) - (30) 1-27	Limerick	TEG Cusack Park; Referee: C Cunning (Antrim)
12 March 2023; 14:00; Round 4	N O'Brien 1-6 (1-0 pen, 5fs, 1 65), K Regan 0-2, T Doyle, R Greville, S McGovern, J Boyle, J Gillen (f), C Doyle, D Clinton (sideline) 0-1 each.	Report	T Morrissey 0-9 (4fs), D Ó Dálaigh 0-5, P Casey 0-3, C Boylan 1-0, D Byrnes (1f, 1 65), C O'Neill, S Flanagan 0-2 each, B Murphy, W O'Donoghue, A Gillane, A O'Connor (free) 0-1 each.	TEG Cusack Park; Referee: C Cunning (Antrim)

12 March 2023; 15:45; Round 4	Cork	2-14 (20) - (18) 0-18	Wexford	Páirc Uí Chaoimh; Referee: S Cleere (Kilkenny)
12 March 2023; 15:45; Round 4	S Kingston (0-8, 0-7 frees); P Power (1-1); S Barrett (0-3); C Beausang (1-0); B Hayes, J O’Connor (0-1 each).	Report	L Chin (0-9, 0-5 frees); S Donohoe, R Higgins, M Dwyer (0-2 each); C McGuckin, C McDonald, C Hearne (0-1 each).	Páirc Uí Chaoimh; Referee: S Cleere (Kilkenny)

==== Division 1 Group A Round 5 ====
19 March 2023; 13:45; Round 5	Clare	2-18 (24) - (24) 2-18	Cork	Cusack Park; Referee: T Walsh (Waterford)
19 March 2023; 13:45; Round 5	A McCarthy 1-11 (9f); D Fitzgerald 0-3; D Reidy 1-0; I Galvin, R Taylor, D Ryan, R Mounsey 0-1 each.	Report	S Harnedy 1-3; C Lehane (3f), D Dalton (3f) 0-4 each; P Power 1-1; B Hayes 0-2; B Roche, J O’Connor, A Cadogen, C Cahalane 0-1 each	Cusack Park; Referee: T Walsh (Waterford)

19 March 2023; 13:45; Round 5	Westmeath	1-12 (15) - (39) 4-27	Galway	TEG Cusack Park; Referee: K Jordan (Tipperary)
19 March 2023; 13:45; Round 5	C Doyle 1-4 (1f); N O'Brien 0-5 (4f); J Galvin, D Glennon, K Regan 0-1 each.	Report	E Niland 0-11 (8f, 1'65'); C Cooney 0-5; B Concannon, D McLoughlin, J Flynn 1-1 each; T Killeen 1-0; John Cooney 0-2; C Fahy, L Collins, G Lee, TJ Brennan, P Mannion, K Cooney 0-1 each.	TEG Cusack Park; Referee: K Jordan (Tipperary)

19 March 2023; 13:45; Round 5	Limerick	2-20 (26) - (15) 0-15	Wexford	TUS Gaelic Grounds; Attendance: 8,341; Referee: M Kennedy (Tipperary)
19 March 2023; 13:45; Round 5	A Gillane 1-5 (0-5f), D Byrnes 0-4 (2f), K Hayes 1-0, T Morrissey (1f), D Ó Dálaigh 0-2 each, R English, M Houlihan, G Hegarty, C O’Neill, M Casey, O O’Reilly, S Flanagan 0-1 each.	Report	L Chin 0-11 (0-10f), I Carty 0-2, C Hearne, Jack O’Connor 0-1 each.	TUS Gaelic Grounds; Attendance: 8,341; Referee: M Kennedy (Tipperary)

=== Division 1 Group B Table ===
NHL semi-finals Relegation play-off

Team	Pld	W	D	L	F	A	Diff	Pts
Tipperary	5	5	0	0	172	113	59	10
Kilkenny	5	4	0	1	128	102	26	8
Waterford	5	2	1	2	128	120	8	5
Dublin	5	2	1	2	129	130	-1	5
Antrim	5	1	0	4	106	135	-29	2
Laois (R)	5	0	0	5	105	168	-63	0

=== Division 1 Group B Rounds 1 to 5 ===
==== Division 1 Group B Round 1 ====
4 February 2023; 14:00; Round 1	Antrim	0-15 (15) - (21) 1-18	Kilkenny	Corrigan Park; Referee: C Mooney (Dublin)
4 February 2023; 14:00; Round 1	C Cunning 0-8 frees, N McKenna 0-2, J McNaughton 0-1, C Bohill 0-1, N McManus 0-1, P Burke 0-1, K Molloy 0-1	Report	B Drennan 1-8 (0-7f), M Keoghan 0-3, P Cody 0-2, W Walsh 0-1, J Donnelly 0-1, P Deegan 0-1, B Ryan 0-1, A Tallis 0-1 free	Corrigan Park; Referee: C Mooney (Dublin)

4 February 2023; 17:00; Round 1	Tipperary	2-32 (38) - (18) 0-18	Laois	FBD Semple Stadium; Attendance: 7,000; Referee: J Murphy (Limerick)
4 February 2023; 17:00; Round 1	G O’Connor (0-11, 7 frees, 1 65); J Morris (1-2); S Kennedy (1-0); C Stakelum, S Ryan, R Maher (1 free) (0-3 each); C O’Dwyer, J McGrath (0-2 each); C Barrett, B McGrath, N McGrath, C Bowe, J Campion, M Kehoe (0-1 each).	Report	PJ Scully (0-6, 5 frees); T Keyes (0-4); J Keyes (0-2); R Mullaney, FC Fennell, L Senior, R King, P Purcell, J Duggan (0-1 each).	FBD Semple Stadium; Attendance: 7,000; Referee: J Murphy (Limerick)

5 February 2023; 14:00; Round 1	Waterford	2-19 (25) - (25) 3-16	Dublin	Fraher Field; Attendance: 3,600; Referee: L Gordon (Galway)
5 February 2023; 14:00; Round 1	Stephen Bennett 2-7 (2-0 pens, 0-7 frees), A Gleeson 0-4 (0-3 frees), M Kiely and T Barron 0-2 each, J Fagan, J Barron, D Hutchinson and J Prendergast 0-1 each.	Report	D Burke 1-7 (1-0 pen, 0-5 frees), C O’Sullivan 2-0, C Bolan 0-3, A Considine 0-2, E O’Donnell, C Donoghue, C Burke and J Flanagan 0-1 each.	Fraher Field; Attendance: 3,600; Referee: L Gordon (Galway)

==== Division 1 Group B Round 2 ====
11 February 2023; 17:00; Round 2	Laois	2-19 (25) - (37) 2-31	Waterford	MW Hire O'Moore Park; Referee: S Stack (Dublin)
11 February 2023; 17:00; Round 2	R Mullaney 2-2, S Maher 0-7 (five frees, one ‘65), A Dunphy and R King 0-2 each, E Rowland (free), I Shanahan, J Kelly, M Phelan, L Senior and P Purcell 0-1 each.	Report	P Fitzgerald 0-7 (5fs), A Gleeson 0-6 (4fs), N Montgomery 1-2, D Hutchinson 1-1, J Prendergast and J Barron 0-3 each, C Lyons and R Halloran 0-2 each, S McNulty, P Curran, M Fitzgerald, C Ryan, P Fitzgerald 0-1 each.	MW Hire O'Moore Park; Referee: S Stack (Dublin)

12 February 2023; 13:30; Round 2	Kilkenny	1-21 (24) - (30) 2-24	Tipperary	UPMC Nowlan Park; Attendance: 10,458; Referee: P Murphy (Carlow)
12 February 2023; 13:30; Round 2	B Drennan 0-10 (7f, 1 65), M Keoghan 1-2, J Donnelly 0-4, P Walsh 0-1, W Walsh 0-1, B Ryan 0-1, S Walsh 0-1, C Fogarty 0-1.	Report	J Forde 1-15 (0-7f, 0-2 65, 0-1 sideline), J Morris 1-2, N McGrath 0-2, C Bowe 0-2, A Tynan 0-1, J Campion 0-1, M Kehoe 0-1.	UPMC Nowlan Park; Attendance: 10,458; Referee: P Murphy (Carlow)

12 February 2023; 15:30; Round 2	Dublin	0-28 (28) - (25) 2-19	Antrim	Parnell Park; Referee: C Lyons (Cork)
12 February 2023; 15:30; Round 2	D Burke 0-10 (5f); C O’Leary 0-3; C Donohoe, C Burke, D Leavy, C Boland, L Murphy, F Whitely 0-2 each; D Power, A Mellett, E O’Donnell 0-1 each.	Report	R McMullan 2-1; C Cunning 0-6 (2f 1 65); N McManus 0-5 (2f); P Burke 0-2; M Bradley, N McKenna, S Elliott, N O’Connor, J McNaughton 0-1 each.	Parnell Park; Referee: C Lyons (Cork)

==== Division 1 Group B Round 3 ====
25 February 2023; 17:00; Round 3	Dublin	0-24 (24) - (29) 2-23	Tipperary	Croke Park; Referee: P O'Dwyer (Carlow)
25 February 2023; 17:00; Round 3	D Burke 0-15 (6 fs, 1 65); A Considine 0-3; C Burke, D Gray, J Flanagan (f), P Crummey, C O’Leary, S Currie 0-1 each.	Report	J Forde 1-10 (8 fs); G O’Connor 0-4 (2 fs); C Bowe 1-0; M Kehoe 0-3; S Kennedy, A Tynan 0-2 each; B McGrath, J Morris 0-1 each.	Croke Park; Referee: P O'Dwyer (Carlow)

26 February 2023; 13:00; Round 3	Waterford	1-22 (25) - (17) 0-17	Antrim	Fraher Field; Referee: F Horgan (Tipperary)
26 February 2023; 13:00; Round 3	P Curran 1-4 (1-0 pen, 2fs), A Gleeson 0-5 (4fs), C Lyons 0-3, C Prunty 0-2, C Ryan, J Fagan, P Leavey, J Barron, N Montgomery, J Prendergast, DJ Foran, Padraig Fitzgerald 0-1 each.	Report	C Cunning 0-11 (10fs), K Molloy 0-2, G Walsh (f), M Bradley, P Boyle, N O'Connor 0-1 each.	Fraher Field; Referee: F Horgan (Tipperary)

26 February 2023; 14:00; Round 3	Laois	1-18 (21) - (34) 0-34	Kilkenny	MW Hire O'Moore Park; Referee: T Gleeson (Dublin)
26 February 2023; 14:00; Round 3	S Maher 0-10 (nine frees), M Phelan 1-0, E Rowland 0-2 (frees) FC Fennell, T Keyes, A Dunphy, J Keyes, P Purcell, R Mullaney 0-1	Report	B Drennan 0-11 (eight frees), M Keoghan and E Cody (two frees) 0-4, J Donnelly 0-3, B Ryan, P Mullen and P Deegan 0-2, T Walsh, C Buckley, E Murphy, A Murphy, P Walsh, G Dunne 0-1.	MW Hire O'Moore Park; Referee: T Gleeson (Dublin)

==== Division 1 Group B Round 4 ====
11 March 2023; 19:15; Round 4	Tipperary	4-23 (35) - (25) 0-25	Waterford	FBD Semple Stadium; Attendance: 5,513; Referee: J Owens (Wexford)
11 March 2023; 19:15; Round 4	J Morris (3-0); G O’Connor (0-9, 8 frees); J Forde (0-6, 1 free); C Bowe (1-0); C Stakelum, M Kehoe (0-2 each); A Tynan, N McGrath, P Maher (0-1 each).	Report	S Bennett (0-8 frees); C Lyons (0-4); J Prendergast, Patrick Fitzgerald (2 frees) (0-3 each); J Barron (0-2), I Daly, N Montgomery, D Hutchinson, C Dunford, Paudie Fitzgerald (0-1 each).	FBD Semple Stadium; Attendance: 5,513; Referee: J Owens (Wexford)

12 March 2023; 13:00; Round 4	Antrim	3-18 (27) - (21) 1-18	Laois	Corrigan Park; Referee: P Murphy (Carlow)
12 March 2023; 13:00; Round 4	C Cunning 1-10 (0-9 frees, 0-1 65), N McManus, 1-1, N Elliott 1-0, K Molloy, 0-2, N McKenna, 0-2, J Maskey 0-1, E O'Neill 0-1, P Burke 0-1	Report	S Maher 0-7 (6 frees), A Dunphy 1-4, T Keyes 0-2, J Keyes 0-2, M Phelan 0-1, R Mullaney 0-1, J Kelly 0-1	Corrigan Park; Referee: P Murphy (Carlow)

12 March 2023; 13:45; Round 4	Kilkenny	2-25 (31) - (20) 1-17	Dublin	UPMC Nowlan Park; Referee: J Murphy (Limerick)
12 March 2023; 13:45; Round 4	B Drennan (0-13, 8 frees); E Cody (2-2); P Deegan (0-3); P Walsh, B Ryan (0-2 each); P Mullen, C Kenny, J Donnelly (0-1 each).	Report	D Burke (0-11, 6 frees, 1 65); P Crummey (1-0); A Considine, C Boland (0-2 each); C O’Leary, C O’Sullivan (0-1 each).	UPMC Nowlan Park; Referee: J Murphy (Limerick)

==== Division 1 Group B Round 5 ====
19 March 2023; 13:45; Round 5	Antrim	2-16 (22) - (40) 4-28	Tipperary	Corrigan Park; Referee: P O'Dwyer (Carlow)
19 March 2023; 13:45; Round 5	C Cunning 0-5 (3fs, 1 ’65); N Elliott 1-2; R McMullan 1-1; M Bradley 0-3; P Boyle 0-2; S Elliott, S Walsh, S McAuley 0-1 each.	Report	G O'Connor 0-9 (7fs, 1 ’65); J McGrath 0-7 (1f); S Ryan 1-3; M Kehoe, C Bowe, P Campion 1-0 each; E Heffernan 0-3; A Tynan, J Fogarty 0-2; J Ryan, J Campion 0-1 each.	Corrigan Park; Referee: P O'Dwyer (Carlow)

19 March 2023; 13:45; Round 5	Dublin	1-29 (32) - (20) 0-20	Laois	Parnell Park; Referee: S Hynes (Galway)
19 March 2023; 13:45; Round 5	D Burke 0-12 (0-9 frees, 0-1 65), A Considine 1-3, C Boland 0-3, D Purcell, C O’Sullivan 0-2, F Whitely 0-2, C Costello 0-2, D Sutcliffe 0-1, P Crummey 0-1, D Grey 0-1.	Report	S Maher 0-11 (frees), S Bergin 0-3, J Kelly 0-2, A Corby 0-1, J Keyes 0-1, PJ Scully 0-1, T Keyes 0-1.	Parnell Park; Referee: S Hynes (Galway)

19 March 2023; 13:45; Round 5	Waterford	0-16 (16) - (18) 0-18	Kilkenny	UPMC Nowlan Park; Referee: L Gordon (Galway)
19 March 2023; 13:45; Round 5	Paudie Fitzgerald 0-6 (6fs), T Barron, C Dunford, N Montgomery all 0-2 each, T De Burca (f), Patrick Fitzgerald, P Curran, J Prendergast all 0-1 each	Report	B Drennan 0-10 (9fs), M Keoghan, E Cody, S Walsh, A Murphy, J Donnelly D Corcoran, C Fogarty, G Dunne all 0-1 each.	UPMC Nowlan Park; Referee: L Gordon (Galway)

=== Division 1 Semi-Finals ===
25 March 2023; 19:30 IWT (UTC±00:00); Semi-final	Tipperary	0-25 (25) - (31) 1-28	Limerick	TUS Gaelic Grounds; Attendance: 11,812; Referee: L Gordon (Galway)
25 March 2023; 19:30 IWT (UTC±00:00); Semi-final	J Forde 0-14 (11fs); A Tynan 0-4; G O’Connor 0-3; S Kennedy 0-2; N McGrath, J Morris 0-1 each.	Report	A Gillane 0-7 (6fs); D Byrnes 0-6 (5fs); P Casey 1-2; D Hannon, C O’Neill, T Morrissey, C Lynch 0-2 each; B Nash, C Coughlan, B Murphy, W O’Donoghue, D Ó Dálaigh 0-1 each.	TUS Gaelic Grounds; Attendance: 11,812; Referee: L Gordon (Galway)

26 March 2023; 16:00 IST (UTC±00:00); Semi-final	Cork	0-22 (22) - (28) 2-22	Kilkenny	UPMC Nowlan Park; Referee: J Keenan (Wicklow)
26 March 2023; 16:00 IST (UTC±00:00); Semi-final	S Kingston (0-9, 8 frees); S Barrett, P Horgan (frees) (0-3 each); C Cahalane, P Power (0-2 each); J O’Connor. R Downey, T O’Mahony (0-1 each).	Report	B Drennan (1-13, 1-0 pen, 8 frees, 4 65s); M Keoghan (1-0); J Donnelly, A Murphy (0-2 each); R Hogan, T Clifford, C Kenny, C Fogarty, G Dunne (0-1 each).	UPMC Nowlan Park; Referee: J Keenan (Wicklow)

=== Division 1 Final ===
9 April 2023; 14:00 IST (UTC+01:00)	Limerick	2-20 (26) - (15) 0-15	Kilkenny	Páirc Uí Chaoimh; Attendance: 17,243; Referee: Paud O'Dwyer (Carlow)
9 April 2023; 14:00 IST (UTC+01:00)	Aaron Gillane 1-7 (5fs), Diarmaid Byrnes 0-5 (3fs), Barry Nash 1-1, Séamus Flanagan 0-3, Darragh O’Donovan 0-2, Cathal O’Neill, Colin Coughlan 0-1 each.	Report	Billy Drennan 0-5 (5fs), Adrian Mullen 0-3, Richie Reid, Paddy Deegan, Eoin Cody (1f) 0-2 each, Huw Lawlor 0-1.	Páirc Uí Chaoimh; Attendance: 17,243; Referee: Paud O'Dwyer (Carlow)

=== Division 1 relegation play-off ===
The bottom teams in the two Division 1 groups meet in a play-off with the losers being relegated to Division 2A.

25 March 2023; Play-off	Westmeath	3-24 (33) - (29) 1-26	Laois	FBD Semple Stadium; Referee: S Stack (Dublin)
25 March 2023; Play-off	K Doyle (0-11, 0-8 frees), J Boyle (1-2), E Keyes (1-1), C Doyle (0-4), N O'Brien (1-0), D McNicholas (0-2), D Glennon (0-1), R Greville (0-1); D Clinton (0-1, free), J Galvin (0-1).	Report	S Maher (0-8, 0-7 frees), J Keyes (0-5), E Rowland (1-0, free); J Kelly (0-2); R King (0-2), S Bergin (0-2), A Dunphy (0-2), T Keyes (0-2); I Shanahan (0-1), M Phelan (0-1), J Duggan (0-1).	FBD Semple Stadium; Referee: S Stack (Dublin)

=== Division 1 scoring statistics ===
Overall

Rank	Player	Club	Tally	Total	Matches	Average
1	Billy Drennan	Kilkenny	2-70	76	7	10.85
2	Donal Burke	Dublin	1-55	58	5	11.60
3	Aidan McCarthy	Clare	2-51	57	5	11.40
4	Jason Forde	Tipperary	2-45	51	4	12.75
5	Conal Cunning	Antrim	1-40	43	5	8.60
5	Stephen Maher	Laois	0-43	43	6	7.16
7	Killian Doyle	Westmeath	0-41	41	4	10.25
7	Evan Niland	Galway	0-41	41	4	10.25
9	Gearóid O'Connor	Tipperary	0-36	36	5	7.20
10	Shane Kingston	Cork	1-31	34	6	5.66

In a single game

Rank	Player	Team	Tally	Total	Opposition
1	Jason Forde	Tipperary	1-15	18	Kilkenny
2	Billy Drennan	Kilkenny	1-13	16	Cork
3	Donal Burke	Dublin	0-15	15	Tipperary
4	Aidan McCarthy	Clare	1-11	14	Cork
4	Jason Forde	Tipperary	0-14	14	Limerick
6	Stephen Bennett	Waterford	2-07	13	Dublin
6	Conal Cunning	Antrim	1-10	13	Laois
6	Aidan McCarthy	Clare	1-10	13	Wexford
6	Jason Forde	Tipperary	1-10	13	Dublin
6	Billy Drennan	Kilkenny	0-13	13	Dublin
6	Killian Doyle	Westmeath	0-13	13	Cork
6	Aidan McCarthy	Clare	0-13	13	Limerick

== Division 2A ==
Locations of the 2023 NHL Division 2A teams.

=== Division 2A Table ===
Division final, winner promoted Division semi-final Automatic relegation to Division 2B

Team	Pld	W	D	L	F	A	Diff	Pts
Kildare	5	4	1	0	123	93	30	9
Offaly (P)	5	4	1	0	121	95	26	9
Kerry	5	3	0	2	111	99	12	6
Carlow	5	2	0	3	108	103	5	4
Down	5	0	1	4	104	126	-22	1
Derry (R)	5	0	1	4	89	140	-51	1

=== Division 2A Rounds 1 to 5 ===
==== Division 2A Round 1 ====
4 February 2023; 14:00; Round 1	Carlow	0-11 (11) - (25) 0-25	Kildare	Netwatch Cullen Park; Referee: T Walsh (Waterford)
4 February 2023; 14:00; Round 1	K McDonald 0-3 (0-1f, 0-1’65), R Coady 0-1, F Fitzpatrick 0-1, J Nolan 0-2, C Whelan 0-1 (f), F O'Toole 0-1 (f), J Treacy 0-1, E Kelly 0-1 (f).	Report	J Burke 0-11 (9 frees), G Keegan 0-2, Cian Boran 0-2, P Dolan 0-2, D Flaherty 0-2, C McCabe 0-2 C Dowling 0-1, J Byrne 0-1, B Byrne 0-1, Conan Boran 0-1	Netwatch Cullen Park; Referee: T Walsh (Waterford)

4 February 2023; 14:00; Round 1	Derry	0-14 (14) - (28) 2-22	Kerry	Celtic Park; Referee: C McDonald
4 February 2023; 14:00; Round 1	J Friel (0-5, frees), C O'Doherty (0-4, frees), J Mullan, M McGrath, R Mullan, C O'Reilly, P Cleary (0-1 each).	Report	P Boyle (0-11, frees), E Ross (1-1), P O'Connor (1-0), D Collins (0-3), D Goggin (0-2), S Conway (0-2), D Griffin, K Carmody (0-2).	Celtic Park; Referee: C McDonald

5 February 2023; 13:00; Round 1	Down	0-18 (18) - (21) 0-21	Offaly	McKenna Park; Referee: J Clarke
5 February 2023; 13:00; Round 1	P Sheehan 0-12 (10f, 1 65); C Egan 0-3; P Og McCrickard, L Savage, F Turpin 0-1 each.	Report	E Cahill 0-10 (8f); O Kelly 0-3; K Sampson 0-2; B Duignan, D Nally, P Clancy, C Mitchell, C Burke, D King 0-1 each.	McKenna Park; Referee: J Clarke

==== Division 2A Round 2 ====
12 February 2023; Round 2	Kildare	1-17 (20) - (19) 0-19	Down	Hawkfield COE; Referee: S Hynes (Galway)
12 February 2023; Round 2	J Burke 0-7 (5f); C McCabe 1-2; B Byrne, P Dolan 0-2 each; C Dowling, P McKenna (f), D Flaherty, R Boran 0-1 each.	Report	P Sheehan 0-8 (4f, 1’65); F Turpin 0-3; S Martin, P McCrickard 0-2 each; B Trainer, T McGrattan, C Taggart, M Conlon 0-1 each.	Hawkfield COE; Referee: S Hynes (Galway)

12 February 2023; Round 2	Offaly	0-33 (33) - (18) 1-15	Derry	Glenisk O'Connor Park; Referee: C Cunning (Antrim)
12 February 2023; Round 2	E Cahill 0-12 (4f, 1 ‘65’); D Nally 0-6 (2 65s and 2f); C Mitchell 0-4; K Sampson, R Ravenhill, C Kiely and A Cleary 0-2 each; D King, P Clancy and B Duignan 0-1 each.	Report	J Friel 0-7 (6f); C O’Doherty 0-3 (2f); R McSorley 1-0; R Mullan 0-2 (1f); M Craig, D McGilligan, J Mullan 0-1 each.	Glenisk O'Connor Park; Referee: C Cunning (Antrim)

12 February 2023; Round 2	Kerry	0-18 (18) - (16) 1-13	Carlow	Austin Stack Park; Referee: M Kennedy (Tipperary)
12 February 2023; Round 2	P Boyle 0-10 (8fs, 1 ’65); F Mackessy 0-2; C Trant, E Ross, S Conway, M Leane, N Mulcahy and P Lucid 0-1 each.	Report	K McDonald (3fs), M Kavanagh (’65, 2fs) 0-4 each; J Doyle 1-0; D Byrne 0-2; F Fitzpatrick, C Kehoe (f) and J Treacy 0-1 each.	Austin Stack Park; Referee: M Kennedy (Tipperary)

==== Division 2A Round 3 ====
25 February 2023; 14:00; Round 3	Kerry	1-18 (21) - (22) 0-22	Offaly	Fitzgerald Stadium; Referee: K Jordan
25 February 2023; 14:00; Round 3	P Boyle (0-8 frees), S Conway (1-1, 1 sideline), F Mackessy and C Walsh (0-2 each), D Collins, K Carmody, N Mulcahy, D Goggin and J Conway (0-1 each).	Report	E Cahill (0-13, 11f’s, 1x65), D Nally (0-3, 1/sl) C Kiely and A Cleary (0-2 each), O Kelly and C Mitchell (0-1 each).	Fitzgerald Stadium; Referee: K Jordan

26 February 2023; Round 3	Derry	0-19 (19) - (29) 2-23	Kildare	Owenbeg COE
26 February 2023; Round 3	C O’Doherty 0-14 (14 frees), J Mullan 0-2, E Conway 0-1, C Gough 0-1, C O’Kane 0-1.	Report	J Burke 0-10 (7 frees,1 '65), B Byrne 1-1, G Keegan 0-5, C McCabe 0-3, K Aherne 1-0, Cl Dowling 0-2, D Flaherty 0-1, S Whelan 0-1.	Owenbeg COE

26 February 2023; Round 3	Carlow	5-24 (39) - (22) 1-19	Down	Netwatch Cullen Park; Referee: S Cleere (Kilkenny)
26 February 2023; Round 3	M Kavanagh 0-13, 0-12f, P Boland 4-0, J Doyle 1-2, J Nolan 0-5, J Treacy, C Kehoe, F Fitzpatrick, J Doyle 0-1 each	Report	P Sheehan 0-10, 0-9f, S Martin 1-1, P McCrickard 0-3, C Egan, M Fisher, R McCusker, C Taggart, D Jordan 0-1 each.	Netwatch Cullen Park; Referee: S Cleere (Kilkenny)

==== Division 2A Round 4 ====
11 March 2023; Round 4	Kildare	2-20 (26) - (21) 0-21	Kerry	St. Conleth's Park; Referee: C Flynn (Westmeath)
11 March 2023; Round 4	J Burke 0-12 (10fs), G Keegan 1-2, B Byrne 1-0, P Dolan 0-1, C McCabe 0-1, P McKenna 0-1, M Delaney 0-1, C Dowling 0-1, D Flaherry 0-1.	Report	S Conway 0-10 (5frees, 1’65), P Boyle 0-6 (5fs), G Dooley 0-2, D Collins 0-1, K Carmody 0-1, J Conway 0-1.	St. Conleth's Park; Referee: C Flynn (Westmeath)

11 March 2023; Round 4	Offaly	1-19 (22) - (15) 1-12	Carlow	Glenisk O'Connor Park; Referee: M Kennedy (Tipperary)
11 March 2023; Round 4	E Cahill 0-11 (0-8f), C Kiely 0-4 (0-1f), D Nally 1-0, O Kelly 0-1, C Mitchell 0-1, A Cleary 0-1, S Dooley 0-1.	Report	M Kavanagh 0-5 (0-3f), C Nolan 0-3 (0-1f), J McCullagh 1-0, D Byrne 0-1, J Kavanagh 0-1, J Doyle 0-1, C Whelan 0-1.	Glenisk O'Connor Park; Referee: M Kennedy (Tipperary)

12 March 2023; Round 4	Down	0-23 (23) - (23) 1-20	Derry	McKenna Park; Referee: S Stack (Dublin)
12 March 2023; Round 4	P Sheehan (0-8, frees), P Og McCrickard (0-6, 0-3 frees, 0-1 sideline); T Prenter (0-3), M Fisher (0-2), L Savage (0-2), O Mac Manus (0-1), D Sands (0-1).	Report	C O’Doherty (1-10, 1-0 pen, 0-9 frees), C O’Reilly (0-3), J Mullan (0-3), J Friel (0-2); C Gough (0-1), D McGilligan (0-1).	McKenna Park; Referee: S Stack (Dublin)

==== Division 2A Round 5 ====
19 March 2023; Round 5	Carlow	2-21 (27) - (16) 0-16	Derry	Netwatch Cullen Park; Referee: T Gleeson (Dublin)
19 March 2023; Round 5	C Kehoe (2-1) C Nolan (0-6) Martin Kavanagh (0-4), P Boland (0-2), R Coady (0-2), J Nolan (0-2), F O’Toole, K McDonald, F Fitzpatrick, J Doyle 0-1 each.	Report	C O’Doherty (0-11), S Melaugh (0-3), P Cleary, J Mullan 0-1 each.	Netwatch Cullen Park; Referee: T Gleeson (Dublin)

19 March 2023; Round 5	Kerry	1-20 (23) - (22) 1-19	Down	Austin Stack Park; Referee: P Murphy (Carlow)
19 March 2023; Round 5	S Conway (0-9, 6f, 1 65), J Conway (1-2), D Goggin (0-3), J Diggins (0-2), D Collins, F Mackessy, P Boyle and P Lucid (0-1 each).	Report	P Sheehan (0-6, 5 fs), T McGrattan (1-3), P Óg McCrickard and D Sands (0-3 each), C Egan (0-2), T Prenter and F Turpin (0-1 each).	Austin Stack Park; Referee: P Murphy (Carlow)

19 March 2023; Round 5	Offaly	2-17 (23) - (23) 0-23	Kildare	Glenisk O'Connor Park; Referee: C Mooney (Dublin)
19 March 2023; Round 5	E Cahill 0-11 (9f 1 '65'), C Mitchell 1-2, D Nally 1-0, K Samspon 0-2, J Sampson and C Kiely 0-1 each.	Report	J Burke 0-10 (9f), D Flaherty and P Dolan 0-3 each, G Keegan, C Dowling and Conan Boran 0-2 each, Cian Boran 0-1.	Glenisk O'Connor Park; Referee: C Mooney (Dublin)

=== Division 2A Semi-Final ===
25 March 2023; 14:00 IWT (UTC±00:00); Semi-final	Offaly	0-23 (23) - (19) 0-19	Kerry	Glenisk O'Connor Park; Referee: T Gleeson (Dublin)
25 March 2023; 14:00 IWT (UTC±00:00); Semi-final	E Cahill 0-13 (11f, 1 65), D Nally 0-3 (1 sideline), C Mitchell 0-2, D Maher 0-1, A Cleary 0-1, J Sampson 0-1, P Clancy 0-1, L Langton 0-1.	Report	P Boyle 0-8 (7f), S Conway 0-4 (4f), J Conway 0-2, D Collins 0-2, E Ross 0-1, K O’Connor 0-1, B Barrett 0-1.	Glenisk O'Connor Park; Referee: T Gleeson (Dublin)

=== Division 2A Final ===
2 April 2023; 14:00 IST (UTC+01:00); Final	Kildare	1-18 (21) – (24) 0-24	Offaly	MW Hire O'Moore Park; Attendance: 2,000; Referee: T Walsh (Waterford)
2 April 2023; 14:00 IST (UTC+01:00); Final	J Burke 0-5 (3f), G Keegan 1-0, D Flaherty 0-3, R Boran, C McCabe, C Boran 0-2 each, P Dolan, J Byrne, B Byrne and D Qualtar 0-1 each	Report	E Cahill 0-11 (6f and 1 '65'), C Kiely 0-4, D Nally 0-3 (1 sideline), K Sampson and A Cleary 0-2 each, S Dooley and B Duignan 0-1 each	MW Hire O'Moore Park; Attendance: 2,000; Referee: T Walsh (Waterford)

=== Division 2A scoring statistics ===
Overall

Rank	Player	Club	Tally	Total	Matches	Average
1	Eoghan Cahill	Offaly	0-81	81	7	11.57
2	James Burke	Kildare	0-55	55	6	9.16
3	Cormac O'Doherty	Derry	1-42	45	5	9.00
4	Paul Sheehan	Down	0-44	44	5	8.80
4	Pádraig Boyle	Kerry	0-44	44	7	7.33
6	Shane Conway	Kerry	1-27	30	6	5.00
7	Marty Kavanagh	Carlow	0-26	26	4	6.50
8	David Nally	Offaly	2-16	22	7	3.14
9	Gerry Keegan	Kildare	2-11	17	6	2.83
10	Pearse Óg McCrickard	Down	0-15	15	5	3.00

In a single game

Rank	Player	Club	Tally	Total	Opposition
1	Cormac O'Doherty	Derry	0-14	14	Kildare
2	Cormac O'Doherty	Derry	1-10	13	Down
2	Marty Kavanagh	Carlow	0-13	13	Down
2	Eoghan Cahill	Offaly	0-13	13	Kerry
2	Eoghan Cahill	Offaly	0-13	13	Kerry
6	Paddy Boland	Carlow	4-00	12	Down
6	James Burke	Kildare	0-12	12	Kerry
6	Eoghan Cahill	Offaly	0-12	12	Derry
6	Paul Sheehan	Down	0-12	12	Offaly
10	Pádraig Boyle	Kerry	0-11	11	Derry
10	James Burke	Kildare	0-11	11	Carlow
10	Eoghan Cahill	Offaly	0-11	11	Carlow
10	Eoghan Cahill	Offaly	0-11	11	Kildare
10	Cormac O'Doherty	Derry	0-11	11	Carlow
10	Eoghan Cahill	Offaly	0-11	11	Kildare

== Division 2B ==
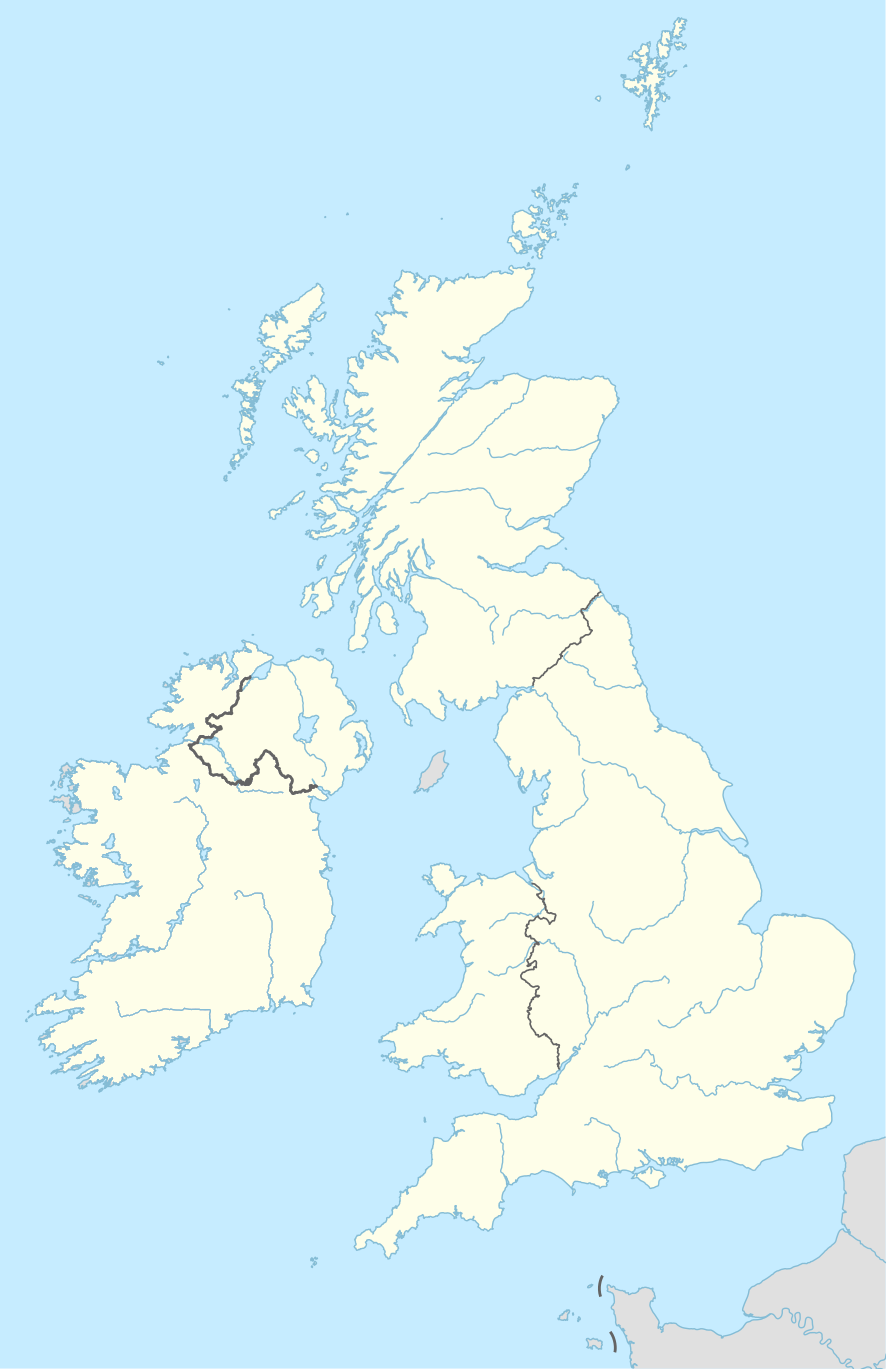
Locations of the 2023 NHL Division 2B teams.

=== Division 2B Table ===
Division final, winner promoted Division semi-final Relegation play-off

Team	Pld	W	D	L	F	A	Diff	Pts
Meath (P)	5	5	0	0	129	87	42	10
Wicklow	5	3	0	2	100	84	16	6
Donegal	5	3	0	2	88	110	-22	6
Tyrone	5	2	0	3	90	97	-7	4
London	5	1	0	4	118	127	-9	2
Sligo (R)	5	1	0	4	85	105	-20	2

=== Division 2B Rounds 1 to 5 ===
==== Division 2B Round 1 ====
4 February 2023; 14:00; Round 1	Donegal	1-16 (19) - (15) 0-15	Sligo	Letterkenny; Referee: T Conway
4 February 2023; 14:00; Round 1	R Campbell (1-3), D Coulter (0-8f), L McKinney (0-2, 1f), D O Maoiléidigh (0-2), G Gilmore (0-1).	Report	A Kilcullen (0-5,1f), D Hannify (0-5, 1f), T Cawley (0-2); J McHugh (0-1), F Connolly (0-1); E O’Donoghue (0-1).	Letterkenny; Referee: T Conway

4 February 2023; 14:00; Round 1	Meath	2-24 (30) - (20) 2-14	Wicklow	Páirc Tailteann; Referee: C Doyle
4 February 2023; 14:00; Round 1	P O'Hanrahan 0-11 seven points, three 65, one sideline cut; S Quigley 1-2; M Cole 1-0; E Og O Donnchadha 0-3; P Barnwell 0-2; K Donnelly 0-1; J Kelly 0-1; P Ryan 0-1; N Potterton 0-1; D Healy 0-1; J Regan 0-1.	Report	A O'Brien 1-5 four frees; G Weir 0-4 frees; S Germaine 1-0; D Staunton 0-2; D Masterson 0-1; D Maloney 0-1; L Evans 0-1.	Páirc Tailteann; Referee: C Doyle

4 February 2023; 19:00; Round 1	Tyrone	1-26 (29) - (27) 3-18	London	O'Neill Park; Referee: P Owens
4 February 2023; 19:00; Round 1	M Little (0-11, 0-8 frees, 0-3 65s), L Devlin (1-1), S Duffin (0-4); R Slane (0-3), CJ McGourty (0-3), C Kearns (0-2), L Dunphy (0-1), C Grogan (0-1).	Report	J Goulding (2-4, 0-1 free), R Crowley (0-7, 0-4 frees), E McHugh (0-4, 0-1 free); N Broderick (1-0), C O’Carroll (0-1), S Glynn (0-1), C McCormack (0-1).	O'Neill Park; Referee: P Owens

==== Division 2B Round 2 ====
12 February 2023; Round 2	London	2-13 (19) - (21) 1-18	Donegal	McGovern Park; Referee: J Clarke
12 February 2023; Round 2	R Crowley 1-9 (0-6f); M Flannery 1-0; R Lodge 0-2; P Mullen, Dáithí Barron 0-1 each.	Report	D Coulter 0-11 (1 ’65, 5f); R McDermott 1-0; R Campbell 0-2; B McIntyre, J O’Loughlin, C Gartland, B Lafferty and R Ryan 0-1 each.	McGovern Park; Referee: J Clarke

12 February 2023; Round 2	Sligo	1-13 (16) - (22) 0-22	Meath	Markievicz Park; Referee: C Flynn
12 February 2023; Round 2	A Kilcullen 0-9 (6f, 2 ‘65’); J McHugh 1-0; D Hanniffy 0-3 (3f); T Cawley 0-1.	Report	P O’Hanrahan 0-15 (12f); P Ryan 0-3; M Healy, N McLarnon, N Potterton J Regan 0-1 each.	Markievicz Park; Referee: C Flynn

12 February 2023; 19:00; Round 2	Wicklow	0-15 (15) - (12) 0-12	Tyrone	Joule Park; Referee: K Brady
12 February 2023; 19:00; Round 2	D Masterson 0-6; L Evans, C Moorehouse 0-2 each; G Weir, P Doyle, A O’Brien (f), S Germaine, P O’Toole 0-1 each.	Report	M Little 0-7 (6f, 1 ‘65); L Devlin, CJ McGrourty 0-2 each; S Duffin 0-1.	Joule Park; Referee: K Brady

==== Division 2B Round 3 ====
19 February 2023; Round 3	Meath	1-23 (26) - (16) 0-16	Donegal	Páirc Tailteann; Referee: K Jordan (Tipperary)
19 February 2023; Round 3	P O'Hanrahan 0-11 (10fs); E O Donnchadha 0-5; J Leavy 1-0; N Potterton 0-2; J Toher 0-1; J Kelly 0-1; P Barnwell 0-1; P Ryan 0-1; S Ennis 0-1.	Report	D Coulter 0-8 (5fs, 1 65); L McKinney 0-2; G Browne 0-1; R McDermott 0-1; R Campbell 0-1; R Ryan 0-1; D O Maoileidigh 0-1; G Gilmore 0-1.	Páirc Tailteann; Referee: K Jordan (Tipperary)

26 February 2023; Round 3	Sligo	0-11 (11) - (21) 2-15	Tyrone	Markievicz Park; Referee: J Connors (Donegal)
26 February 2023; Round 3	D Hanniffy 0-4; A Kilcullen 0-3 (1f); C Hanniffy, J McHugh, T Cawley, E O'Donoghue 0-1 each.	Report	D Begley 0-8 (8f); B McGurk, L Devlin 1-0 each; C Grogan 0-3; S Duffin, M Little (f), A Crossan, C Kearns 0-1 each.	Markievicz Park; Referee: J Connors (Donegal)

26 February 2023; Round 3	Wicklow	0-23 (23) - (14) 0-14	London	Joule Park; Referee: C Mooney (Dublin)
26 February 2023; Round 3	C Moorehouse (0-6, 6f), D Masterson (0-5); D Maloney (0-3), E McCormack (0-2), P Doyle (0-2), P Doran (0-1), L Maloney (0-1), M Murphy (0-1); L Evans (0-1), A O’Brien (0-1, f).	Report	R Crowley (0-3, 1f, 1 65), J Goulding (0-5), D Barron (0-2), D Dawson (0-2), C Byrne (0-1), R Lodge (0-1).	Joule Park; Referee: C Mooney (Dublin)

==== Division 2B Round 4 ====
11 March 2023; Round 4	London	5-16 (31) - (26) 2-20	Sligo	McGovern Park
11 March 2023; Round 4	R Crowley 1-9, J Goulding 2-0, D Barron 1-3, E McHugh 1-1, N Broderick 0-2, D Dawson 0-1.	Report	A Kilcullen 0-10, C Hanniffy 1-2, T Cawley 1-1, J McHugh 0-4, F Connolly 0-1, D Hanniffy 0-1, E Comerford 0-1.	McGovern Park

11 March 2023; Round 4	Tyrone	0-08 (8) - (23) 2-17	Meath	O'Neill's Healy Park
11 March 2023; Round 4	D Begley 0-4 (4f), S Duffin 0-3, L Devlin 0-1.	Report	E O Donnchadha 1-4, P O'Hanrahan 0-5 (3f), S Morris 1-1, S Quigley 0-2, S Ennis 0-1, K Donnelly 0-1, P Ryan 0-1.	O'Neill's Healy Park

12 March 2023; Round 4	Donegal	0-11 (11) - (30) 2-24	Wicklow	O'Donnell Park
12 March 2023; Round 4	L McKinney (3f) 0-7; O Marley 0-2; B MacIntyre, C Bradley 0-1 each.	Report	C Moorehouse (3f), E McCormack, P Doyle, D Staunton 0-4 each; S O’Dowd 1-1; G Weir 1-0; A O’Brien, D Masterson 0-2 each; M Murphy, L Maloney, D Maloney 0-1 each.	O'Donnell Park

==== Division 2B Round 5 ====
19 March 2023; Round 5	Donegal	1-18 (21) - (20) 1-17	Tyrone	O'Donnell Park
19 March 2023; Round 5	B McIntyre 1-2, J O'Loughlin (3f) 0-5, R McDermott, R Ryan, D Ó Maoildeidigh, S Ward, O Marley 0-2 each, L McKinney 0-1.	Report	D Begley 0-8 (6f), S Duffin 1-2, M Little 0-3 (1f), L Devlin 0-2, C Lagan, C Kearns 0-1 each.	O'Donnell Park

19 March 2023; Round 5	London	2-21 (27) - (28) 2-22	Meath	McGovern Park; Referee: C Flynn (Wexford)
19 March 2023; Round 5	J Goulding 1-5 (0-1’sl), E McHugh 1-0, R Crowley 0-13 (10f), D Dawson, F O’Keefe, S Glynn 0-1 each.	Report	É Ó Donnchadha 2-1, J Regan 0-13 (7f), S Ennis 0-3, S Morris 0-2, E Fitzgerald, J Leavy, M Cole 0-1 each.	McGovern Park; Referee: C Flynn (Wexford)

19 March 2023; Round 5	Sligo	1-14 (17) - (12) 0-12	Wicklow	O'Donnell Park; Referee: A McAleer (Donegal)
19 March 2023; Round 5	D Hanniffy 0-8 (5f, 1 '65'); E O'Donoghue 0-3 (1f); T Cawley 1-0; J McHugh 0-2; C Hanniffy 0-1.	Report	G Weir 0-4 (1f, 1 '65'); M Lee 0-3 (1f); A O'Brien 0-2 (1f); M Murphy, L Evans, D Maloney 0-1 each.	O'Donnell Park; Referee: A McAleer (Donegal)

=== Division 2B Semi-Final ===
25 March 2023; 15:00 IWT (UTC±00:00); Semi-final	Wicklow	0-16 (16) - (17) 0-17	Donegal	Echelon Park Aughrim; Referee: T Walsh (Waterford)
25 March 2023; 15:00 IWT (UTC±00:00); Semi-final	C Moorehouse 0-8 (7f and 65), Andy O’Brien 0-2, M O’Brien, P Doran, D Masterson, E McCormack, S Germaine, M Lee 0-1 each.	Report	L McKinney 0-10 (9f and 65), B McIntyre 0-2, J O’Loughlin, C Bradley, R Campbell, R Ryan, R McDermott 0-1 each.	Echelon Park Aughrim; Referee: T Walsh (Waterford)

=== Division 2B Final ===
2 April 2023; 14:00 IST (UTC+01:00); Final	Meath	0-20 (20) – (14) 0-14	Donegal	Avant Money Páirc Seán Mac Diarmada; Referee: C McDonald
2 April 2023; 14:00 IST (UTC+01:00); Final		Report		Avant Money Páirc Seán Mac Diarmada; Referee: C McDonald

=== Division 2B relegation play-off ===
26 March 2023; 13:00 BST (UTC+1)	London	1-27 (30) – (28) 1-25	Sligo	Páirc Colmcille; Referee: T Conway
26 March 2023; 13:00 BST (UTC+1)		Report	A Kilcullen (0-14), T Cawley (0-6), J McHugh (1-1), E O’Donoghue (0-2), D Hanniffy (0-1); C Hanniffy (0-1).	Páirc Colmcille; Referee: T Conway

=== Division 2B scoring statistics ===
Overall

Rank	Player	Club	Tally	Total	Matches	Average
1	Ronan Crowley	London	2-41	47	5	9.40
2	Pádraig O'Hanrahan	Meath	0-42	42	4	10.50
3	Jack Goulding	London	5-14	29	4	7.25
4	Declan Coulter	Donegal	0-27	27	3	9.00
4	Andy Kilcullen	Sligo	0-27	27	4	6.75
6	Éamonn Ó Donnchadha	Meath	3-13	22	5	4.40
6	Mickey Little	Tyrone	0-22	22	5	4.40
6	Liam McKinney	Donegal	0-22	22	6	3.66
9	Diarmuid Hanniffy	Sligo	0-21	21	5	4.20
10	Dermot Begley	Tyrone	0-20	20	3	6.66
10	Christy Moorehouse	Wicklow	0-20	20	4	5.00

In a single game

Rank	Player	Team	Tally	Total	Opposition
1	Pádraig O'Hanrahan	Meath	0-15	15	Sligo
2	Ronan Crowley	London	0-13	13	Meath
2	Jack Regan	Meath	0-13	13	London
4	Ronan Crowley	London	1-09	12	Donegal
4	Ronan Crowley	London	1-09	12	Sligo
6	Pádraig O'Hanrahan	Meath	0-11	11	Donegal
6	Pádraig O'Hanrahan	Meath	0-11	11	Wicklow
6	Mickey Little	Tyrone	0-11	11	London
6	Declan Coulter	Donegal	0-11	11	London
10	Jack Goulding	London	2-04	10	Tyrone
10	Andy Kilcullen	Sligo	0-10	10	London
10	Liam McKinney	Donegal	0-10	10	Wicklow

== Division 3A ==
Locations of the 2023 NHL Division 3A teams.

=== Division 3A Table ===
Division final, winner promoted Division semi-final Automatic relegation to Division 3B

Team	Pld	W	D	L	F	A	Diff	Pts
Roscommon (P)	5	2	2	1	97	76	21	6
Armagh	5	3	0	2	103	114	-11	6
Monaghan	5	3	0	2	91	119	-28	6
Mayo	5	2	1	2	135	91	44	5
Louth	5	2	0	3	93	117	-24	4
Fermanagh (R)	5	1	1	3	101	103	-2	3

=== Division 3A Rounds 1 to 5 ===
==== Division 3A Round 1 ====
4 February 2023; 14:00; Round 1	Louth	1-16 (19) - (27) 3-18	Armagh	Darver COE; Referee: C Daly
4 February 2023; 14:00; Round 1	M Gahan 0-8 (3f), C Shaw 0-3 (1f, 165’), F Joyce 0-2, S Stafford, S Kerrisk 0-1 and P Fortune 0-1 each.	Report	D Magee 2-1, E McGuinness 1-2, F Donnelly 0-6 (5f), T Galvin and S Harvey 0-3each, S Óg McGuinness P Lappin and B Shortt 0-1 each.	Darver COE; Referee: C Daly

4 February 2023; 14:00; Round 1	Monaghan	2-13 (19) - (17) 1-14	Fermanagh	St. Tiernach's Park; Referee: A Mc Aleer
4 February 2023; 14:00; Round 1	F Rafter 0-5 (4f); H Byrne 1-1f; T Hughes 1-0; C Gernon, S Lambe (2f) 0-2 each; C Merrick, D Hughes, J Slevin 0-1 each.	Report	D Teague 0-5 (1f); D McKeogh 1-1; L McCusker (2f), Caolán Duffy 0-3 each; S Corrigan 0-2.	St. Tiernach's Park; Referee: A Mc Aleer

4 February 2023; 14:00; Round 1	Mayo	0-17 (17) - (17) 0-17	Roscommon	Hastings Insurance MacHale Park; Referee: N Malone
4 February 2023; 14:00; Round 1	C Philips 0-10 (8f, 1 ’65), M Farrell and K Gallagher 0-2 each, A Philips, P Dozio and J Byrne 0-1 each.	Report	MJ Egan 0-9 (6f), E Fitzgerald 0-2, J Dowling, E Mulry, D Finn, C Mulry, B Mulry and M Brennan 0-1 each.	Hastings Insurance MacHale Park; Referee: N Malone

==== Division 3A Round 2 ====
11 February 2023; Round 2	Armagh	0-22 (22) - (23) 2-17	Monaghan	Box-It Athletic Grounds; Referee: P Owens
11 February 2023; Round 2	F Donnelly 0-12 (9f); T Galvin 0-3; C Jennings, S McGuiness 0-2 each; D Magee, R Shine, N Curry 0-1 each.	Report	F Rafter 1-5 (1 pen 5f); T Hughes 0-3; C Guinan 1-0; J Slevin, C Gernon, C McHugh, N Garland 0-2 each; S Lambe 0-1.	Box-It Athletic Grounds; Referee: P Owens

12 February 2023; Round 2	Roscommon	0-15 (15) - (22) 2-16	Louth	Dr Hyde Park; Referee: Brian Keon
12 February 2023; Round 2	MJ Egan 0-5 (5f), C Mulry 0-5; J Dowling 0-2; D Finn 0-1, P Fallon 0-1 (1f), E Fitzgerald 0-1.	Report	C Murphy 1-2, M Gahan 0-5 (4f); R Walsh 1-1, L Molloy 0-2; A Mackin 0-2, S Kerrisk 0-1, C Shaw 0-1 (1f), S Hodgins 0-1; P Fallon 0-1.	Dr Hyde Park; Referee: Brian Keon

12 February 2023; Round 2	Fermanagh	2-18 (24) - (22) 2-16	Mayo	Ederney; Referee: M Farrell
12 February 2023; Round 2	J Tormey 2-0, S Corrigan, L McCusker (2f, 1’65) 0-4 each, B Teehan 0-3, B Corrigan, F McBrien (1f) 0-2 each, Caolan Duffy, T Cleary, D McKeogh 0-1 each.	Report	C Phillips 0-9 (9f), A Phillips 2-0, J Mooney, D Huane (1f) 0-2 each, D Hill, J Heraty, J McManus 0-1 each.	Ederney; Referee: M Farrell

==== Division 3A Round 3 ====
26 February 2023; Round 3	Monaghan	1-19 (22) - (18) 1-15	Louth	St. Mary's Park; Referee: A McAleer (Donegal)
26 February 2023; Round 3	F Rafter 1-11 (0-9f, 1-0p), D Hughes 0-3, T Hughes 0-3, N Garland 0-1; J Slevin 0-1.	Report	D Geoghegan 0-12 (10f), S Conneely 1-0, S Kerrisk 0-2, P Fortune 0-1.	St. Mary's Park; Referee: A McAleer (Donegal)

26 February 2023; Round 3	Armagh	2-16 (22) - (21) 0-21	Mayo	Box-It Athletic Grounds
26 February 2023; Round 3	F Donnelly 1-11, D Magee 1-1, C Jennings 0-2, S Harvey 0-2.	Report	C Phillips 0-7, J Coyne 0-3, J Mooney 0-3, E Delaney 0-3, S Kenny 0-2, D Kenny 0-1, A Phillips 0-1, D Huane 0-1.	Box-It Athletic Grounds

26 February 2023; Round 3	Fermanagh	1-14 (17) - (17) 1-14	Roscommon	Derrylin Grounds
26 February 2023; Round 3	L McCusker 0-10, D McKeogh 1-0, B Corrigan 0-1, S Curran 0-1, F McBrien 0-1, T Cleary 0-1.	Report	P Fallon 0-7, B Mulry 1-3, E Fitzgerald 0-3, J Dowling 0-1.	Derrylin Grounds

==== Division 3A Round 4 ====
12 March 2023; Round 4	Roscommon	2-20 (26) - (6) 0-06	Armagh	Dr. Hyde Park; Referee: C Doyle (Tipperary)
12 March 2023; Round 4	C Mulry 1-4; N Connaughton 1-2; P Fallon (5f) 0-5; E Flanagan (0-1f) 0-3; E Fitzgerald 0-2; E Kiernan, A Donnelly, J Dowling, D Mulry 0-1 each.	Report	C Jennings (3f) 0-4, F Donnelly (1f), D Magee 0-1.	Dr. Hyde Park; Referee: C Doyle (Tipperary)

12 March 2023; Round 4	Louth	0-19 (19) - (18) 1-15	Fermanagh	Darver COE; Referee: J Clarke (Cavan)
12 March 2023; Round 4	D Geoghegan (8f, '65’) 0-9; S Kerrisk 0-4; Mark Gahan 0-3; R Walsh, S Stafford and L Molloy 0-1 each.	Report	D Teague (3f, '65’) 0-5; A Flanagan 1-1; D McKeogh (3f) 0-3; D Bannon, JP McGarry, S Corrigan, R Bogue (f), F McBrien and C Duffy 0-1 each	Darver COE; Referee: J Clarke (Cavan)

12 March 2023; Round 4	Mayo	5-25 (40) - (13) 0-13	Monaghan	Hastings MacHale Park; Referee: M Farrell (Roscommon)
12 March 2023; Round 4	C Phillips 0-11, A Phillips 1-4, J Coyne 1-3, E Delaney 1-2, D Huane 1-2, S Kenny 1-0, D Kenny 0-1, D Hill 0-1, J Cassidy 0-1.		N Garland 0-5, F Rafter 0-4, S Lambe 0-2, P Malone 0-1, C Flynn 0-1.	Hastings MacHale Park; Referee: M Farrell (Roscommon)

==== Division 3A Round 5 ====
18 March 2023; Round 5	Armagh	3-17 (26) - (25) 3-16	Fermanagh	Box-It Athletic Grounds
18 March 2023; Round 5	T Galvin (2-3), F Donnelly (0-9, 8f), Danny Magee (1-0), C Renaghan (0-2), S Harvey (0-2), C Jennings (0-1).	Report	L McCusker (1-9, 7f), S Corrigan (1-2), JP McGarry (1-1), D Teague (0-2), C Duffy (0-1), B Corrigan (0-1).	Box-It Athletic Grounds

18 March 2023; Round 5	Monaghan	0-14 (14) - (22) 1-19	Roscommon	Páirc Uí Néill; Referee: T Conway (Derry)
18 March 2023; Round 5	F Rafter 0-8 (0-6f), N Arthur 0-2, N Garland 0-1, T Hughes 0-1, P Malone 0-1, C McNally 0-1.	Report	P Fallon 0-9 (0-4f), B Mulry 1-1, E Fitzgerald 0-3, MJ Egan 0-2, E Flanagan 0-2f, C Mulry 0-1, N Connaughton 0-1.	Páirc Uí Néill; Referee: T Conway (Derry)

18 March 2023; Round 5	Louth	0-15 (15) - (35) 5-20	Mayo	Darver COE
18 March 2023; Round 5	D Geoghegan 0-7 (5f,165’), C Murphy 0-3, M Gahan 0-2, A McGuinness Smith, S Kerrisk and S Conneely 0-1 each.	Report	A Phillips 2-3, E Delaney 2-2, C Phillips 0-8 (6f, 165’), J McManus 1-2, M Farrell 0-2, D Huane, J Coyne and J Mooney 0-1 each.	Darver COE

=== Division 3A Semi-Final ===
25 March 2023; 14:00 IWT (UTC±00:00); Semi-Final	Armagh	2-23 (29) - (16) 0-16	Monaghan	BOX-IT Athletic Grounds
25 March 2023; 14:00 IWT (UTC±00:00); Semi-Final	F Donnelly 0-16, C Jennings 1-2, S Harvey 1-2, D Magee 0-1, T Galvin 0-1, O Curry 0-1.		F Rafter 0-9, N Arthur 0-4, C Gernon 0-2, C Power 0-1.	BOX-IT Athletic Grounds

=== Division 3A Final ===
1 April 2023; 14:00 IST (UTC+01:00); Final	Roscommon	2-17 (23) - (15) 0-15	Armagh	Páirc Tailteann; Referee: J Connors (Donegal)
1 April 2023; 14:00 IST (UTC+01:00); Final	MJ Egan 1-5 (0-1f), P Fallon 0-7 (0-3f), C Mulry 1-0, A Donnelly 0-2, E Fitzgerald 0-2, N Connaughton 0-1.	Report	F Donnelly 0-9 (0-8f), T O’Hare 0-2f, C Jennings 0-1, T Galvin 0-1, T Nevin 0-1, B Shortt 0-1f.	Páirc Tailteann; Referee: J Connors (Donegal)

=== Division 3A scoring statistics ===
Overall

Rank	Player	Club	Tally	Total	Matches	Average
1	Fionntain Donnelly	Armagh	1-64	67	7	9.57
2	Fergal Rafter	Monaghan	2-42	48	6	8.00
3	Cormac Phillips	Mayo	0-45	45	5	9.00
4	Luca McCusker	Fermanagh	1-26	29	4	7.25
4	Paddy Fallon	Roscommon	0-29	29	6	4.83
6	Darren Geoghegan	Louth	0-28	28	3	9.33
7	Adrian Phillips	Mayo	5-09	24	5	4.80
7	Mickey Joe Egan	Roscommon	1-21	24	6	4.00
9	Mark Gahan	Louth	0-18	18	5	3.60
10	Danny Magee	Armagh	4-05	17	7	2.42
10	Conor Mulry	Roscommon	2-11	17	5	3.40

In a single game

Rank	Player	Team	Tally	Total	Opposition
1	Fionntain Donnelly	Armagh	0-16	16	Monaghan
2	Fergal Rafter	Monaghan	1-11	14	Louth
2	Fionntain Donnelly	Armagh	1-11	14	Mayo
4	Luca McCusker	Fermanagh	1-09	12	Armagh
4	Darren Geoghegan	Louth	0-12	12	Monaghan
4	Fionntain Donnelly	Armagh	0-12	12	Monaghan
7	Cormac Phillips	Mayo	0-11	11	Monaghan
8	Cormac Phillips	Mayo	0-10	10	Roscommon
8	Luca McCusker	Fermanagh	0-10	10	Roscommon
10	Adrian Phillips	Mayo	2-03	9	Louth
10	Tomás Galvin	Armagh	2-03	9	Fermanagh
10	Fionntain Donnelly	Armagh	0-09	9	Fermanagh
10	Mickey Joe Egan	Roscommon	0-09	9	Mayo
10	Cormac Phillips	Mayo	0-09	9	Fermanagh
10	Darren Geoghegan	Louth	0-09	9	Fermanagh
10	Paddy Fallon	Roscommon	0-09	9	Monaghan
10	Fergal Rafter	Monaghan	0-09	9	Armagh
10	Fionntain Donnelly	Armagh	0-09	9	Roscommon

== Division 3B ==
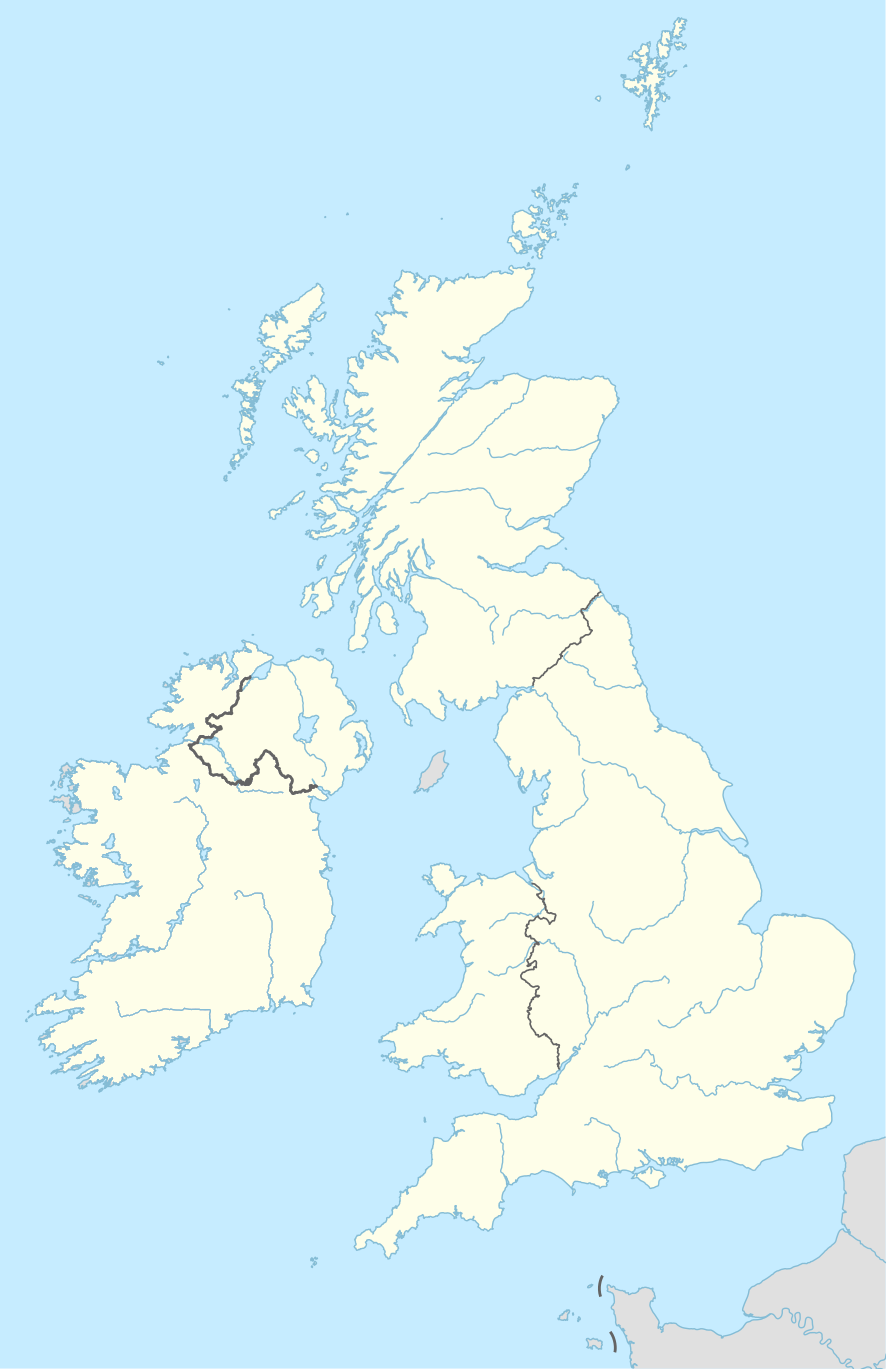
Locations of the 2023 NHL Division 3B teams.

=== Division 3B Table ===
Division final, winner promoted Division semi-final

Team	Pld	W	D	L	F	A	Diff	Pts
Cavan (P)	4	3	0	1	77	66	11	6
Leitrim	4	3	0	1	81	70	11	6
Longford	4	2	0	2	57	45	12	4
Lancashire	4	2	0	2	90	80	10	4
Warwickshire	4	0	0	4	57	101	-44	0

=== Division 3B Rounds 1 to 5 ===
==== Division 3B Round 1 ====
4 February 2023; 14:00; Round 1	Longford	0-14 (14) - (16) 1-13	Cavan	Pearse Park; Referee: M Farrell
4 February 2023; 14:00; Round 1	C Mullane (0-07, 2F 1 ’65), R Murray (0-03), D Buckley (0-02, 2F), J Mulhern (0-01), M Hawes (0-01).	Report	C Maher (1-08, 1-05F), J Smith (0-01), M Moffett (0-01), D Mulligan (0-01), A Sheridan 0-01), J Barry (0-01)	Pearse Park; Referee: M Farrell

4 February 2023; 14:30; Round 1	Warwickshire	3-06 (15) - (24) 1-21	Leitrim	Páirc na hÉireann; Referee: K Parke
4 February 2023; 14:30; Round 1	L Hands 2-2 (2fs), B Fallon 0-2, J Collins 1-0, B O’Sullivan, J Grealish 0-1 each.	Report	M Feaney 0-7 (1fs) M Dervan 1-6 (4fs) Clement Cunniffe 0-2 (1fs), S O’Riordain (0-2), P Poniard, J Murray, B Delaney, S Goldrick 0-1 each.	Páirc na hÉireann; Referee: K Parke

==== Division 3B Round 2 ====
11 February 2023; Round 2	Cavan	2-20 (26) - (15) 2-09	Warwickshire	Breffni Park; Referee: C Daly
11 February 2023; Round 2	C Maher 0-12, (7f); R Delaney, A Sheridan 1-1 each; D Carney 0-3; Colum Keating 0-2; S Keating 0-1.	Report[	J Grealish 1-4 (2f); L Hands 1-3 (3f); J Collins, J Lynch 0-1 each.	Breffni Park; Referee: C Daly

11 February 2023; Round 2	Leitrim	3-21 (30) - (25) 3-16	Lancashire	Páirc Seán Mac Diarmada; Referee: A McAleer
11 February 2023; Round 2	B Delaney 2-6; M Derwin 0-7 (3f, '65'); S Goldrick 1-1; S O'Riordan 0-2; G O'Hagan, J Fitzgibbon, M Feeney, C Hackett & J Murray 0-1 each.	Report	R Spencer 0-8 (3f, '65'); D Burke 2-1; C Kennedy 1-3; S Madden 0-2; S Nugent & E Kelly 0-1 each.	Páirc Seán Mac Diarmada; Referee: A McAleer

==== Division 3B Round 3 ====
25 February 2023; Round 3	Lancashire	3-11 (20) - (14) 0-14	Cavan	National Sports Campus
25 February 2023; Round 3	R Spencer (1-4f), C Kennedy (2-1), L Burns, S Nugent, E Kearns, C Madden, A Morgan, S Madden (0-1).	Report	N Kenny (0-5), C Maher (0-4f), D Carney (0-3,1f), T Leonard, G Fitzpatrick (0-1).	National Sports Campus

25 February 2023; Round 3	Warwickshire	1-06 (9) - (16) 2-10	Longford	Páirc na hÉireann
25 February 2023; Round 3	J Grealish 1-3, L Hands 0-3.	Report	D Buckley (0-5, 4f), R Sheahan (1-0), D Crossan (1-0), R Murray (0-3), P Lynam (0-1, f); E Tully (0-1).	Páirc na hÉireann

==== Division 3B Round 4 ====
11 March 2023; Round 4	Longford	0-18 (18) - (10) 0-10	Lancashire	Glennon Brothers Pearse Park
11 March 2023; Round 4	P Lynam (0-08, 6F), R Murray (0-4), C Mullane (0-03), D Crossan, R Sheahan, C Flynn (all 0-01 each).	Report	S Madden (0-06, 2F), D Burke (0-02, 1F), E Kearns (0-01), D Carroll (0-01).	Glennon Brothers Pearse Park

12 March 2023; Round 4	Cavan	0-21 (21) - (17) 2-11	Leitrim	Kingspan Breffni Park
12 March 2023; Round 4	C Maher (7f, ’65) 0-10; D Carney, N Kenny 0-3 each; L Óg Cooke, R Delaney, A Sheridan, S Keating, Cillian Sheanon 0-1 each.		M Dervan (5f) 0-5; S Goldrick, P Poinard 1-0 each; B Delaney, G O’Hagan (1f) 0-2 each; J Fitzgibbon, D McGovern 0-1 each.	Kingspan Breffni Park

==== Division 3B Round 5 ====
18 March 2023; Round 5	Lancashire	5-20 (35) - (18) 1-15	Warwickshire	Páirc na hÉireann
18 March 2023; Round 5	S Madden (2-4); R Spencer (0-9, 1 Pen, 6f, 1’65), R McCormack (2-2), C Madden (1-1), E Kearns (0-2), D Carroll (0-2).	Report	J Grealish (1-8, 6f, 1’65); L Hands (0-5, 4f), M Keane (0-1), K Murphy (0-1).	Páirc na hÉireann

18 March 2023; Round 5	Leitrim	0-10 (10) - (9) 0-09	Longford	Shane McGettigan Memorial Park
18 March 2023; Round 5	J Murray 0–6 (5f); G. O'Hagan 0–2 (2f); M Feeney & E Moreton 0–1 (each).	Report	M Hawes 0–4 (4f); E Allen 0–2 (2f); E Tully, R Sheehan & R Murray 0–1 (each).	Shane McGettigan Memorial Park

=== Division 3B Semi-Final ===
25 March 2023; 14:00 IWT (UTC±00:00); Semi-Final	Leitrim	2-16 (22) - (15) 1-12	Longford	Shane McGettigan Park
25 March 2023; 14:00 IWT (UTC±00:00); Semi-Final	J Murray 2-1, G O'Hagan 0-6, M Feeney 0-2, S Goldrick 0-1, T Branagan 0-1, J McNabola 0-1, D McGovern 0-1, C Moreton 0-1, C Cunniffe 0-1, B Delaney 0-1.		C Mullane 0-6, C Cunniffe 1-0, (og), P Lynham 0-3, R Murray 0-2, E Tully 0-1.	Shane McGettigan Park

=== Division 3B Final ===
1 April 2023; 15:00 IST (UTC+01:00); Final	Cavan	0-17 (17) - (16) 0-16	Leitrim	National Games Development Centre; Referee: P Owens (Down
1 April 2023; 15:00 IST (UTC+01:00); Final	C Maher (0-9, 3f, 65), N Kenny (0-7), R Delaney (0-1).	Report	G O’Hagan (0-6, 4f), D McGovern (0-2, 1f), J Murray (0-3), S Markem (0-1), J McNabola (0-1), C Beirne (0-1), M Dervan (0-1f).	National Games Development Centre; Referee: P Owens (Down

=== Division 3B scoring statistics ===
Overall

Rank	Player	Club	Tally	Total	Matches	Average
1	Canice Maher	Cavan	1-43	46	5	9.20
2	Jack Grealish	Warwickshire	3-16	25	4	6.25
2	Robin Spencer	Lancashire	1-21	24	3	8.00
4	Luke Hands	Warwickshire	3-13	22	4	5.50
4	Michael Dervan	Leitrim	1-19	22	4	5.50
6	Shane Madden	Lancashire	2-13	19	4	4.75
7	Joe Murray	Leitrim	2-12	18	5	3.60
8	Gavin O'Hagan	Leitrim	0-17	17	5	3.40
9	Brendan Delaney	Leitrim	2-10	16	4	4.00
9	Cathal Mullane	Longford	0-16	16	3	5.33

In a single game

Rank	Player	Team	Tally	Total	Opposition
1	Brendan Delaney	Leitrim	2-06	12	Lancashire
1	Canice Maher	Cavan	0-12	12	Warwickshire
3	Canice Maher	Cavan	1-08	11	Longford
4	Michael Dervan	Leitrim	2-06	12	Warwickshire
5	Jack Grealish	Warwickshire	1-08	11	Lancashire
6	Shane Madden	Lancashire	2-04	10	Warwickshire
6	Canice Maher	Cavan	0-10	10	Leitrim
8	Robin Spencer	Lancashire	0-09	9	Warwickshire
8	Canice Maher	Cavan	0-09	9	Leitrim
10	Luke Hands	Warwickshire	2-02	8	Leitrim
10	Robin Spencer	Lancashire	0-08	8	Leitrim
10	Paddy Lynam	Longford	0-08	8	Lancashire
