= 2022 All-Ireland Under-20 Hurling Championship =

Championship Details
- Dates: 2 April - 22 May 2022
- Teams: 17

All Ireland Champions
- Winners: Kilkenny (12th win)
- Captain: Pádraic Moylan
- Manager: Derek Lyng

All Ireland Runners-up
- Runners-up: Limerick
- Captain: Jimmy Quilty
- Manager: Diarmuid Mullins

Provincial Champions
- Munster: Limerick
- Leinster: Kilkenny
- Ulster: Not Played
- Connacht: Not Played

Championship Statistics
- Matches Played: 20
- Total Goals: 45 (2.25 per game)
- Total Points: 715 (35.75 per game)
- Top Scorer: Billy Drennan (1-40)

The 2022 All-Ireland Under-20 Hurling Championship was the fourth staging of the All-Ireland Under-20 Championship and the 59th staging overall of a hurling championship for players between the minor and senior grades. The championship began on 2 April 2022 and ended on 22 May 2022.

Cork entered the championship as defending champions in search of a third successive title, however, they were beaten by Tipperary in the Munster semi-final.

The final was played on 22 May 2022 at Semple Stadium in Thurles, between Kilkenny and Limerick, in what was their first meeting in a final in five years. Kilkenny won the match by 0-19 to 0-18 to claim their 12th championship title overall and a first title since 2008.

Kilkenny's Billy Drennan was the championship's top scorer with 1-40.

== Format change ==
For the first time in its history, the Munster Under-20 Championship replaced its traditional straight knockout format with a group stage. This guaranteed all teams at least two games. The All-Ireland semi-finals, which featured the defeated provincial finalists in 2018 and 2019, will be discontinued.

== Leinster Under-20 Hurling Championship ==
=== Leinster round 1 ===
2 April 2022 Round 1	Meath	1-12 - 1-18	Kildare	Páirc Tailteann
	J Murray 0-9; J Cole 1-2, J Coyne 0-1.	Report	F Maher 0-10, C McCabe 0-6, D Melville 1-0, J Higgins 0-1, F O'Sullivan 0-1.

2 April 2022 Round 1	Antrim	0-12 - 3-21	Laois	Parnell Park
	C McGarry 0-6 (four frees), S McIntosh 0-2, S McAuley 0-2 (frees), R McMullan 0-1, T Smyth 0-1,	Report	J Duggan 1-4, N Quinlan 2-1, C Dunne 0-7 (three frees, one ’65), P Brennan 0-4, D Delaney 0-3 (frees), A Kirwan 0-1, N Coss 0-1.

2 April 2022 Round 1	Carlow	1-13 - 2-18	Westmeath	Netwatch Cullen Park
	F O'Toole 1-8, C Kehoe 0-1, F Fitzpatrick 0-1, J Wall 0-1, D Murphy 0-1, E English 0-1.	Report	S Williams 0-9, D McCormack 1-3, M Cunningham 1-0, D Williams 0-2, C Murphy 0-1, J Murtagh 0-1, P Clarke 0-1, E Cunneen 0-1.	Referee: C Daly (Kildare)

=== Leinster round 2 ===
9 April 2022 Round 2	Westmeath	0-13 - 2-17	Wexford	TEG Cusack Park
	S Williams 0-8, M Cunningham 0-2, C Murphy 0-1, P Clarke 0-1, B Gaffney 0-1,	Report	C Byrne (0-9, 8f); S O’Hagan, O Pepper (1-1 each); D Carley (0-2); C Foley, JJ Twamley, D Codd, T Kinsella (0-1 each).

9 April 2022 Round 2	Kildare	0-16 - 1-21	Laois	St Conleth's Park
	F Maher 0-4 (two frees), J Higgins and C McCabe (two frees) 0-3 each, A O’Brien, D Melville, F O’Sullivan, C Boran, C Flanagan and C Shanahan 0-1 each.	Report	A Kirwan 1-3, D Delaney (all frees) and C Dunne (two frees) 0-5 each, J Duggan, N Quinlan and T Keyes 0-2 each, C Comerford and I Shanahan 0-1 each.

=== Leinster quarter-finals ===
19 April 2022 Quarter-final	Laois	0-16 - 0-17	Wexford	MW Hire O'Moore Park
	D Delaney 0-7 (0-6f), C Dunne 0-3 (0-2f), E Critchley, A Kirwan, S Fitzpatrick, T Cuddy, C Comerford and P Tynan 0-1 each.	Report	C Byrne 0-7 (0-5f), C Dunbar-Byrne 0-4, T Kinsella 0-2, AJ Redmond, D Carley, S O’Hagan and J Redmond 0-1 each. Laois:	Referee: D Hughes (Kilkenny)

20 April 2022 Quarter-final	Kilkenny	3-21 - 1-16	Offaly	UPMC Nowlan Park
	B Drennan 1-7 (0-7f); H Shine 1-3; B Reid, G Dunne 0-3 each; J Doyle 1-0; T Clifford 0-2; P Langton, P McDonald, A Hickey 0-1 each.	Report	L Quinn 0-6 (6f); L Nolan 1-2; DJ McLoughlin, L Carey (2f) 0-2 each; S Ryan, D Bourke, C Mitchell, D Tierney 0-1 each.	Referee: C Flynn (Westmeath)

=== Leinster semi-finals ===
2 May 2022 Semi-final	Wexford	1-15 - 1-14	Dublin	Chadwicks Wexford Park
	C Byrne 0-10 (8 frees, 1 ’65), J Redmond 1-1, J Barrett, C Molloy, D Carley, T Kinsella 0-1 each.	Report	D Purcell 1-4 (0-2 frees), J O’Brien, B Scanlon (frees), D Crowe, T Gleeson 0-2 each, C Ó Cathasaigh, D Ó Dúllaing 0-1 each.	Referee: S Guinan (Offaly)

2 May 2022 Semi-final	Kilkenny	1-28 - 1-27 (aet)	Galway	Bord na Móna O'Connor Park
	B Drennan (0-17, 0-14f, 0-2 65’s), G Dunne (1-0), T Clifford (0-3), J Doyle, H Shine and J Fitzpatrick (0-2 each), I Byrne and T Dunne (0-1 each).	Report	L Collins (0-12, 0-6f, 0-1 65), R Davitt (1-1), A Conaire (0-3), D Davoren, C Molloy D Hanniffy (0-2 each), T Lee, S McDonagh, D McLoughlin (0-1 each), J Cooney (0-1, 0-1f)	Referee: R Fitzsimons (Offaly)

=== Leinster final ===
10 May 2022 Final	Wexford	0-15 - 1-13	Kilkenny	Netwatch Cullen Park
	C Byrne 0-10 (9fs), J Redmond 0-2, T Kinsella 0-1, C Molloy 0-1, R Lawlor.	Report	B Drennan 0-7(fs), D Walsh 0-3, J. Doyle 1-0, T Clifford 0-1, A Hickey 0-1, P Langton 0-1	Referee: C Mooney (Dublin)

== Munster Under-20 Hurling Championship ==
=== Munster group stage ===
==== Group 1 table ====
Pos	Team	Pld	W	D	L	SF	SA	Diff	Pts
1	Limerick	2	2	0	0	44	37	7	4
2	Cork	2	1	0	1	44	48	-4	2
3	Clare	2	0	0	2	35	38	-3	0

==== Group 1 fixtures ====
6 April 2022 Round 1	Limerick	3-07 - 0-15	Clare	TUS Gaelic Grounds
	C O’Neill 2-3; P Kirby 1-0; A O’Connor 0-2 (1f);C Coughlan, J Quilty 0-1 each.	Report	S Punch 0-6 (0-5 frees); P Crotty, K Smyth 0-2 each; D Cahill, J Kirwan, C O’Meara, C Hergarty, C Galvin 0-1 each.	Referee: N Wall (Cork)

13 April 2022 Round 2	Clare	1-17 - 1-19	Cork	O'Garney Park
	K Smyth (0-6, 0-5 frees); S Punch (0-4, 0-4 frees); S Meehan (1-1); P Crotty (0-3); C Hegarty, D Cahill, O O’Donnell (0-1 each).	Report	B Cunningham (0-8, 0-7 frees, 0-1 ‘65); D Healy (1-0); E O’Leary (0-3, 0-3 frees), B O’Sullivan (0-3, 0-1 sc); B Keating (0-2); E Twomey, J Cahalane, C Walsh (0-1 each).	Referee: C Doyle (Tipperary)

20 April 2022 Round 3	Cork	1-19 - 1-25	Limerick	Páirc Uí Chaoimh
	B Cunningham (0-10, 0-7 frees); B O’Sullivan (0-4); J Cahalane (1-0); C Smyth, L Horgan, B Keating, E O’Leary, D Hogan (0-1 each).	Report	A O’Connor (0-9, 0-7 frees); C Coughlan (0-4, 0-1 free); D Ó Dalaigh (1-1); E Stokes, S O’Brien, J Sweeney, J Kirby (0-2 each); A English, J Quilty, P Kirby (0-1 each).	Referee: M Kennedy (Tipperary)

==== Group 2 table ====
Pos	Team	Pld	W	D	L	SF	SA	Diff	Pts
1	Tipperary	2	2	0	0	51	36	15	4
2	Waterford	2	1	0	1	55	42	13	2
3	Kerry	2	0	0	2	28	56	-28	0

==== Group 2 fixtures ====
6 April 2022 Round 1	Kerry	0-13 - 3-15	Tipperary	Austin Stack Park
	R Walsh (0-5, 0-4f); N Guerin (0-4, 0-3f); K Carroll 0-2; F O’Sullivan, D Moriarty, D Slattery all 0-1 each.	Report	P McGarry 1-2; E Connolly, P Creedon 1-1 each; S Gleeson 0-4f; K Shelly 0-3f; J Leamy, E Ryan, S Kenneally, C Cadell, J Campion all 0-1 each.	Referee: N O'Toole (Waterford)

13 April 2022 Round 2	Tipperary	2-21 - 1-20	Waterford	FBD Semple Stadium
	K Shelly 1-10 (9fs, 1 65), P McGarry 1-2, P Creedon, J Leamy 0-2 each, C Quinn, J Campion, D Stakelum, E Connolly, C Fogarty 0-1 each.	Report	A Ryan 0-10 (6fs, 3 65s), Pádraig Fitzgerald 1-2, Patrick Fitzgerald 0-3 (1f), J O Floinn, S Callaghan, S Walsh, M Fitzgerald, J Foley 0-1 each.	Referee: N Malone (Clare)

20 April 2022 Round 3	Waterford	2-26 - 1-12	Kerry	Walsh Park
	A Ryan 0-12 (10fs), Padraig Fitzgerald 2-4, J Booth 0-3, M Fitzgerald, S Callaghan 0-2 each, J Foley, T Flynn, C Rellis 0-1 each.	Report	F O'Sullivan 0-7 (4fs, 1 65), M Kelliher 1-0, R O'Mahony 0-2, L Crowley, C Walsh, R Walsh (1f) 0-1 each.	Referee: S Stokes (Cork)

=== Munster semi-finals ===
27 April 2022 Semi-final	Limerick	0-27 - 3-15	Waterford	TUS Gaelic Grounds
	A O'Connor 0-10 (5frees), A English and S O'Brien 0-5 each, E Stokes and C Coughlan 0-2 each, D O Dalaigh, C Thomas and P Kirby 0-1 each.	Report	A Ryan 0-8 (5frees, 1 '65), Patrick Fitzgerald 1-2 (1-0free), C Rellis and J Foley 1-0 each, S Fitzgerald, J Booth, W Beresford, Pádraig Fitzgerald and S Callaghan 0-1 each.	Referee: C Doyle (Tipperary)

27 April 2022 Semi-final	Tipperary	2-20 - 1-21	Cork	Semple Stadium
	K Shelly 0-5 (0-5f), J Leamy 0-5 (0-1f), J Campion 1-2, P Creedon 0-4, P McGarry 1-0, E Connolly 0-2, E Ryan, M Corcoran 0-1 each.	Report	B Cunningham 0-4 (0-3f, 0-1 ’65), B O’Sullivan 0-4, C Walsh 1-1, S Walsh 0-3, D Healy 0-3, D Hogan 0-2, J Cahalane 0-1, E Twomey 0-1, L Horgan 0-1, D Flynn 0-1 (0-1f).	Referee: N Malone (Clare)

=== Munster final ===
4 May 2022 Final	Limerick	1-25 - 2-18	Tipperary	TUS Gaelic Grounds
	A O’Connor (0-9, 0-6 frees); A English (1-2); S O’Brien (0-5); C Thomas, C Scully, C Coughlan, J Quilty, J Kirby, E Stokes, P Kirby, P Reale, P O’Donovan (0-1 each).	Report	K Shelly (1-6, 0-3 frees); J Leamy (1-3, 0-1 free); P Creedon, P McGarry (0-3 each); C Quinn, D Stakelum, S Kenneally (0-1 each).	Referee: N Malone (Clare)

== All-Ireland Under-20 Hurling Championship Final ==
=== All-Ireland final ===
22 May 2022 Final	Limerick	0-18 - 0-19	Kilkenny	FBD Semple Stadium
	A O’Connor 0-10 (0-7f), A English 0-2, P O’Donovan 0-2, P Kirby 0-1, E Stokes 0-1, C Coughlan 0-1, S O’Brien 0-1	Report	B Drennan 0-9 (0-3f, 0-1 65), T Clifford 0-3, I Byrne 0-2, D Walsh 0-2, A Tallis 0-1 (0-1f), P Langton 0-1, A Hickey 0-1	Referee: Thomas Walsh (Waterford)

== Statistics ==
=== Top scorers ===
Top scorers overall

Rank	Player	County	Tally	Total	Matches	Average
1	Billy Drennan	Kilkenny	1-40	43	4	10.75
2	Aidan O'Connor	Limerick	0-40	40	5	8.00
3	Cian Byrne	Wexford	0-36	36	4	9.00
4	Kyle Shelly	Tipperary	2-24	30	4	7.50
4	Aaron Ryan	Waterford	0-30	30	3	10.00
6	Ben Cunningham	Cork	0-22	22	3	7.33
7	Shane Williams	Westmeath	0-17	17	2	8.50
8	Pádraig Fitzgerald	Waterford	3-07	16	3	5.33
9	Dan Delaney	Laois	0-15	15	3	5.00
9	Cillian Dunne	Laois	0-15	15	3	5.00

Top scorers in a single game

Rank	Player	Club	Tally	Total	Opposition
1	Billy Drennan	Kilkenny	0-17	17	Galway
2	Kyle Shelly	Tipperary	1-10	13	Waterford
3	Aaron Ryan	Waterford	0-12	12	Kerry
3	Liam Collins	Galway	0-12	12	Kilkenny
5	Fiach O'Toole	Carlow	1-08	11	Westmeath
6	Pádraig Fitzgerald	Waterford	2-04	10	Kerry
6	Billy Drennan	Kilkenny	1-07	10	Offaly
6	Cian Byrne	Wexford	0-10	10	Dublin
6	Aidan O'Connor	Limerick	0-10	10	Waterford
6	Aidan O'Connor	Limerick	0-10	10	Kilkenny
6	Fionn Maher	Kildare	0-10	10	Meath
6	Aaron Ryan	Waterford	0-10	10	Tipperary
6	Ben Cunningham	Cork	0-10	10	Limerick
6	Cian Byrne	Wexford	0-10	10	Kilkenny
