= 2023 Carlow Senior Hurling Championship =

Annual hurling competition season

- Dates: 28 June – 13 August 2023
- Teams: 6
- Sponsor: JJ Kavanagh & Sons
- Champions: Mount Leinster Rangers (11th title); Diarmuid Byrne (captain); Paul O'Brien (manager)
- Runners-up: St Mullin's; James Doyle (captain); Maurice Aylward (manager)

Tournament statistics
- Matches played: 18
- Goals scored: 51 (2.83 per match)
- Points scored: 568 (31.56 per match)
- Top scorer(s): Marty Kavanagh (3–74)

The 2023 Carlow Senior Hurling Championship was the 94th staging of the Carlow Senior Hurling Championship since its establishment by the Carlow County Board in 1927. The championship ran from 28 June to 13 August 2023.

St Mullin's were the defending champions.

The final was played on 13 August 2023 at Netwatch Cullen Park in Carlow, between Mount Leinster Rangers and St Mullin's, in what was their 10th meeting in the final overall and a first meeting in two years. Mount Leinster Rangers won the match by 3–19 to 1–17 to claim their 11th championship title overall and a first title in two years.

Marty Kavanagh was the championship's top scorer with 3–74.

== Group stage ==
=== Group stage table ===
Advance to knockout stage

Team	Matches				Score			Pts
Team	Pld	W	D	L	For	Against	Diff	Pts
St Mullin's	5	5	0	0	145	68	77	10
Mount Leinster Rangers	5	4	0	1	132	76	56	8
Bagenalstown Gaels	5	3	0	2	106	127	−21	6
Ballinkillen	5	2	0	3	91	91	0	4
Naomh Eoin	5	1	0	4	77	92	−15	2
Naomh Bríd	5	0	0	5	57	154	−97	0

=== Group stage results ===
28 June 2023 Round 1	St Mullin's	3–18 – 1–11	Ballinkillen	Netwatch Cullen Park
	M Kavanagh 0–8, P Boland 2–1, James Doyle 1–3, John Doyle 0–3, P Kehoe 0–1, J O'Neill 0–1, O Boland 0–1.		E English 0–7, C Wall 1–0, J Treacy 0–2, D English 0–1, K Kavanagh 0–1.

30 June 2023 Round 1	Bagenalstown Gaels	4–22 – 3–10	Naomh Bríd	The Training Centre
	J Doyle 3–3, P McDonnell 1–4, C Doyle 0–7, J Wall 0–2, R Kane 0–2, D Doyle 0–2, D Nolan 0–1, K Guidera 0–1.		A Amond 2–2, F O'Toole 0–4, M Bambrick 1–0, A Dunne 0–1, S Kirwan 0–1, J Murphy 0–1, D Kavanagh 0–1.

30 June 2023 Round 1	Mount Leinster Rangers	0–15 – 1–10	Naomh Eoin	Netwatch Cullen Park
	T Joyce 0–5, D Tobin 0–3, K McDonald 0–3, D Murphy 0–2, C Nolan 0–1, C Kavanagh 0–1.		C Beck 0–5, G Ruschitzko 1–0, JM Nolan 0–2, S Tracey 0–1, A Kenny 0–1, C Abbey 0–1.

6 July 2023 Round 2	Ballinkillen	0–16 – 0–09	Naomh Eoin	Netwatch Cullen Park
	E English 0–10, S Murphy 0–3, J Treacy 0–1, P Hynes 0–1, R Dunbar 0–1.		C Abbey 0–3, JM Nolan 0–2, S Tracey 0–2, C Beck 0–1, M Nolan 0–1.

7 July 2023 Round 2	Mount Leinster Rangers	4–22 – 3–13	Bagenalstown Gaels	Netwatch Cullen Park
	C Nolan 2–9, D Murphy 2–2, T Joyce 0–5, C Kavanagh 0–3, D Tobin 0–2, R Coady 0–1.		C Doyle 0–7, J Wall 1–2, Jake Doyle 1–1, M McDoanld 1–0, D Nolan 0–1, J Whelan 0–1, D Doyle 0–1.

7 July 2023 Round 2	St Mullin's	1–22 – 0–12	Naomh Bríd	The Training Centre
	M Kavanagh 1–11, S Murphy 0–3, J Doyle 0–2, J O'Neill 0–2, P Boland 0–1, O Boland 0–1, E Doyle 0–1, J Kavanagh 0–1.		F O'Toole 0–6, A Amond 0–4, M Bambrick 0–2.

14 July 2023 Round 3	St Mullin's	0–24 – 1–15	Mount Leinster Rangers	Netwatch Cullen Park
	M Kavanagh 0–12, J Doyle 0–3, J O'Neill 0–2, S Murphy 0–2, G Coady 0–1, P O'Shea 0–1, J Kavanagh 0–1, C Kehoe 0–1, P Boland 0–1.		C Nolan 1–7, C Kavanagh 0–2, R Coady 0–2, K McDonald 0–2, D Tobin 0–1, D Murphy 0–1.

16 July 2023 Round 3	Ballinkillen	2–21 – 1–10	Naomh Bríd	Netwatch Cullen Park
	E English 0–6, S Kelly 0–6, S Murphy 1–2, M Foley 1–1, K Kavanagh 0–2, C Lomax 0–2, J Tracey 0–1, C Wall 0–1.		A Amond 1–1, F O'Toole 0–4, J Murphy 0–2, D Kavanagh 0–1, F O'Byrne 0–1, Z Kelly 0–1.

16 July 2023 Round 3	Bagenalstown Gaels	1–16 – 2–11	Naomh Eoin	Netwatch Cullen Park
	C Doyle 0–12, P McDonnell 1–0, M McDonald 0–1, D Doyle 0–1, Jake Doyle 0–1, J Wall 0–1.		S Tracey 2–0, C Beck 0–6, J Smithers 0–2, B Tracey 0–2, M Kavanagh 0–1.

22 July 2023 Round 4	Naomh Eoin	1–19 – 0–08	Naomh Bríd	Netwatch Cullen Park
	B Tracey 1–0, JM Nolan 0–3, D Kavanagh 0–3, G Kavanagh 0–2, C Beck 0–2, M Kavanagh 0–2, G Ruschitzko 0–2, J Smithers 0–2, C Tracey 0–2, S Tracey 0–1.		F O'Toole 0–7.

22 July 2022 Round 4	Mount Leinster Rangers	1–16 – 1–09	Ballinkillen	Netwatch Cullen Park
	C Nolan 1–5, K McDonald 0–3, R Coady 0–2, D Tobin 0–2, C Kavanagh 0–2, E Byrne 0–1, J Nolan 0–1.		J Tracey 1–2, S Kelly 0–4, S Murphy 0–1, D English 0–1, R Dunbar 0–1.

22 July 2022 Round 4	St Mullin's	3–26 – 0–08	Bagenalstown Gaels	Netwatch Cullen Park
	M Kavanagh 0–14, P Connors 1–2, S Murphy 1–0, P Boland 0–2, J O'Neill 0–2, James Doyle 0–2, O Boland 0–1, John Doyle 0–1, E Doyle 0–1, J Kavanagh 0–1.		C Doyle 0–2, P McDonnell 0–2, D Nolan 0–2, J Clarke 0–1, J McCullagh 0–1.

28 July 2023 Round 5	Bagenalstown Gaels	3–14 – 2–16	Ballinkillen	Netwatch Cullen Park
	C Doyle 0–9, J Doyle 2–1, P McDonnell 1–1, C Guidera 0–2, JP Treacy 0–1.		C Whelan 1–8, C Wall 1–3, S Kelly 0–2, M Foley 0–1, S Cummins 0–1, J Tracey 0–1.

29 July 2023 Round 5	Mount Leinster Rangers	4–34 – 0–05	Naomh Bríd	Netwatch Cullen Park
	J Nolan 1–7, D Tobin 0–7, D Murphy 0–7, E Byrne 1–3, C Kavanagh 1–2, P Coady 0–5, F Fitzpatrick 1–0, T Joyce 0–2, K McDonald 0–1.		A Amond 0–5.

29 July 2023 Round 5	St Mullin's	4–22 – 0–16	Naomh Eoin	Netwatch Cullen Park
	M Kavanagh 2–8, C Kehoe 1–1, S Murphy 1–1, J Doyle 0–4, J O'Neill 0–4, P O'Shea 0–1, J Kavanagh 0–1, E Doyle 0–1, P Connors 0–1.		JM Nolan 0–5, M Kavanagh 0–4, C Beck 0–4, T Daly 0–1, D Kavanagh 0–1, C Tracey 0–1.

== Knockout stage ==
=== Semi-finals ===
6 August 2023 Semi-final	Mount Leinster Rangers	0–20 – 0–15	Bagenalstown Gaels	Netwatch Cullen Park
	K McDonald 0–8, C Nolan 0–5, J Nolan 0–2, C Kavanagh 0–2, D Byrne 0–1, F Fitzpatrick 0–1, D Murphy 0–1.		C Doyle 0–8, J Doyle 0–2, JP Treacy 0–2, D Nolan 0–2, P McDonnell 0–1.	Referee: P O'Dwyer (Palatine)

6 August 2023 Semi-final	St Mullin's	0–20 – 1–07	Ballinkillen	Netwatch Cullen Park
	M Kavanagh 0–12, C Kehoe 0–4, J Doyle 0–2, E Doyle 0–1, J O'Neill 0–1.		C Foley 0–4, C Wall 1–0, S Murphy 0–1, S Kelly 0–1, M Foley 0–1.	Referee: B Deering (Rathvilly)

=== Final ===
13 August 2023 Final	Mount Leinster Rangers	3–19 – 1–17	St Mullin's	Netwatch Cullen Park
	C Nolan 1–9 (4fs), D Murphy, C Kavanagh 0–3 each, F Fitzpatrick, D Tobin 1–0 each, J Nolan 0–2, T Joyce, T Brennan 0–1 each.	Report	M Kavanagh 0–9 (2 65s 4fs), J O Neill 1–1, J Kavanagh 0–2, S Murphy 0–2 each, C Kehoe, E Doyle, J Doyle 0–1 each.	Referee: S Doyle

== Top scorers ==
Rank	Player	Club	Tally	Total	Matches	Average
1	Marty Kavanagh	St Mullin's	3–74	83	7	11.85
2	Chris Nolan	Mount Leinster Rangers	5–36	51	6	8.50
3	Craig Doyle	Bagenalstown Gaels	0–45	45	6	7.50
4	Jake Doyle	Bagenalstown Gaels	6-08	26	6	4.33
5	Eric English	Ballinkillen	0–23	23	6	3.83
6	Denis Murphy	Mount Leinster Rangers	2–16	22	7	3.14
7	Aaron Amond	Naomh Bríd	3–12	21	5	4.20
7	Fiach O'Toole	Naomh Bríd	0–21	21	5	4.20
9	Ciarán Kavanagh	Mount Leinster Rangers	1–15	18	7	2.57
10	Colm Beck	Naomh Eoin	0–18	18	5	3.60

In a single game

Rank	Player	Club	Tally	Total	Opposition
1	Chris Nolan	Mount Leinster Rangers	2-09	15	Bagenalstown Gaels
2	Marty Kavanagh	St Mullin's	2-08	14	Naomh Eoin
2	Marty Kavanagh	St Mullin's	1–11	14	Naomh Bríd
2	Marty Kavanagh	St Mullin's	0–14	14	Bagenalstown Gaels
5	Jake Doyle	Bagenalstown Gaels	3-03	12	Naomh Bríd
5	Chris Nolan	Mount Leinster Rangers	1-09	12	St Mullin's
5	Craig Doyle	Bagenalstown Gaels	0–12	12	Naomh Eoin
5	Marty Kavanagh	St Mullin's	0–12	12	Mount Leinster Rangers
5	Marty Kavanagh	St Mullin's	0–12	12	Ballinkillen
10	Ciarán Whelan	Ballinkillen	1-08	11	Bagenalstown Gaels
