= 2020 Carlow Senior Hurling Championship =

Annual hurling competition season

- Dates: 24 July – 30 August 2020
- Teams: 5
- Sponsor: JJ Kavanagh & Sons
- Champions: Mount Leinster Rangers (9th title); Michael Doyle (captain); Conor Phelan (manager)
- Runners-up: Ballinkillen; David English (captain); Tommy Comerford (manager)

Tournament statistics
- Matches played: 13
- Goals scored: 32 (2.46 per match)
- Points scored: 406 (31.23 per match)
- Top scorer(s): Ciarán Whelan (0–48)

The 2020 Carlow Senior Hurling Championship was the 91st staging of the Carlow Senior Hurling Championship since its establishment by the Carlow County Board in 1927. The championship ran from 24 July to 30 August 2020.

St. Mullin's entered the championship as the defending champions.

The final was played on 30 August 2020 at Netwatch Cullen Park, between Mount Leinster Rangers and Ballinkillen, in what was their first ever meeting in a final in 19 years. Mount Leinster Rangers won the match by 3–21 to 0–12 to claim their ninth championship title overall and first title in two years.

Ballinkillen's Ciarán Whelan was the championship's top scorer with 0–48.

== Team changes ==
=== To championship ===
Promoted from the Carlow Intermediate Hurling Championship

- Bagenalstown Gaels

== Group stage ==
=== Group stage table ===
Advance to knockout stage

Team	Matches				Score			Pts
Team	Pld	W	D	L	For	Against	Diff	Pts
Mount Leinster Rangers	4	4	0	0	99	52	47	8
St Mullin's	4	2	0	2	71	73	−2	4
Ballinkillen	4	2	0	2	74	78	−4	4
Naomh Eoin	4	2	0	2	67	75	−8	4
Bagenalstown Gaels	4	0	0	4	68	101	47	0

=== Group stage results ===
25 July 2020 Round 1	St Mullin's	2–17 – 1–11	Naomh Eoin	Netwatch Cullen Park
	M Kavanagh 0–11, J Doyle 1–3, O Ryan 1–0, J O'Neill 0–2, S Murphy 0–1.		C Treacy 0–5, B Treacy 1–0, JM Nolan 0–3, M Clowry 0–1, O Kelly 0–1, C Foley 0–1.

25 July 2020 Round 1	Ballinkillen	1–19 – 0–14	Bagenalstown Gaels	Netwatch Cullen Park
	C Whelan 0–11, S Murphy 0–4, O Roberts 1–0, C Wall 0–2, D Roberts 0–1, D Sheehan 0–1.		C Doyle 0–13, E Minchin 0–1.

31 July 2020 Round 2	St Mullin's	0–14 – 3–14	Ballinkillen	Netwatch Cullen Park
	M Kavanagh 0–8, J Kavanagh 0–3, S Murphy 0–2, J O'Neill 0–1.		C Whelan 0–10, M Dalton 2–1, S Murphy 1–1, O Roberts 0–1, R Dunbar 0–1.

1 August 2020 Round 2	Mount Leinster Rangers	1–16 – 2–05	Naomh Eoin	Netwatch Cullen Park
	C Nolan 0–8, T Joyce 1–1, J Nolan 0–2, K McDonald 0–1, D Tobin 0–1, D Murphy 0–1, R Coady 0–1, E Byrne 0–1.		C Treacy 1–3, JM Nolan 1–1, M Kavanagh 0–1.

4 August 2020 Round 3	Bagenalstown Gaels	1–16 – 3–15	St Mullin's	Netwatch Cullen Park
	C Doyle 0–11, J Clarke 1–1, J Wall 0–2, B Doyle 0–2.		M Kavanagh 1–8, S Murphy 2–1, J Walsh 0–3, J Kavanagh 0–1, J O'Neill 0–1, O Ryan 0–1.

4 August 2020 Round 3	Ballinkillen	0–16 – 4–19	Mount Leinster Rangers	Netwatch Cullen Park
	C Whelan 0–5, M Dalton 0–3, S Murphy 0–2, D Sheehan 0–2, E Whelan 0–2, R Dunbar 0–1, J Wall 0–1.		D Murphy 0–7, T Joyce 1–3, C Nolan 1–2, J Nolan 1–2, K McDonald 1–1, D Tobin 0–1, R Coady 0–1, G Lawler 0–1, E Byrne 0–1.

9 August 2020 Round 4	Mount Leinster Rangers	3–23 – 1–12	Bagenalstown Gaels	Netwatch Cullen Park
	D Murphy 1–7, D Tobin 1–4, C Nolan 0–7, E Byrne 1–2, J Murphy 0–1, K McDonald 0–1, C Kavanagh 0–1.		C Doyle 0–8, R Whelan 1–0, E Minchin 0–2, J McCullagh 0–1, B Doyle 0–1.

9 August 2020 Round 4	Naomh Eoin	2–13 – 1–10	Ballinkillen	Netwatch Cullen Park
	JM Nolan 1–2, C McCabe 1–1, C Treacy 0–4, E Hosey 0–1, M Kavanagh 0–1, M Clowry 0–1.		C Whelan 0–7, E Whelan 1–0, M Dalton 0–1, D English 0–1, J Wall 0–1.

16 August 2020 Round 5	Mount Leinster Rangers	0–17 – 0–10	St Mullin's	Netwatch Cullen Park
	C Nolan 0–7, D Murphy 0–4, E Byrne 0–2, P Coady 0–2, C Kavanagh 0–1, J Nolan 0–1.		J O'Neill 0–8, P Kehoe 0–1, J Doyle 0–1.

16 August 2020 Round 5	Naomh Eoin	0–23 – 1–17	Bagenalstown Gaels	Netwatch Cullen Park
	D Kavanagh 0–9, C Treacy 0–4, JM Nolan 0–3, R Smithers 0–3, M Mullins 0–1, E Hosey 0–1, M Clowry 0–1, B Treacy 0–1.		C Doyle 0–11, J Clarke 1–1, B Doyle 0–2, D Doyle 0–2, J Doyle 0–1.

== Knockout stage ==
=== Semi-finals ===
23 August 2020 Semi-final	Ballinkillen	1–20 – 1–19	St Mullin's	Netwatch Cullen Park
	C Whelan 0–7, S Whelan 0–4, D Wall 1–0, S Murphy 0–3, D Sheehan 0–2, C Wall 0–2, J Treacy 0–1, E Whelan 0–1.		M Kavanagh 1–13, J Doyle 0–3, J Walsh 0–1, J O'Neill 0–1, S Murphy 0–1.

23 August 2020 Semi-final	Mount Leinster Rangers	1–22 – 0–11	Naomh Eoin	Netwatch Cullen Park
	C Nolan 1–8, D Murphy 0–4, J Nolan 0–3, E Byrne 0–2, T Joyce 0–2, D Byrne 0–1, P Coady 0–1, K McDonald 0–1.		D Kavanagh 0–4, C Treacy 0–2, C Foley 0–1, M Mullins 0–1, R Smithers 0–1, M Nolan 0–1, M Kavanagh 0–1.

=== Final ===
30 August 2020 Final	Mount Leinster Rangers	3–21 – 0–12	Ballinkillen	Netwatch Cullen Park
	D Murphy 2–7 (4f, 1’65), C Nolan 0–8 (1f), E Byrne 1–2, P Coady 0–1, T Joyce 0–1, M Malone 0–1, D Tobin 0–1	Report	C Whelan 0–8 (7f, 1’65), C Wall 0–1, E Whelan 0–1, S Murphy 0–1, D Sheehan 0–1.	Referee: J Murphy

== Championship statistics ==
=== Top scorers ===
Overall

Rank	Player	Club	Tally	Total	Matches	Average
1	Ciarán Whelan	Ballinkillen	0–48	48	6	8.00
2	Marty Kavanagh	St Mullin's	2–40	46	4	11.50
2	Chris Nolan	Mount Leinster Rangers	2–40	46	6	7.66
4	Craig Doyle	Bagenalstown Gaels	0–43	43	4	10.75
5	Denis Murphy	Mount Leinster Rangers	3–30	39	6	6.50

In a single game

Rank	Player	Club	Tally	Total	Opposition
1	Craig Doyle	Bagenalstown Gaels	0–13	13	Ballinkillen
2	Marty Kavanagh	St Mullin's	1-08	11	Bagenalstown Gaels
2	Chris Nolan	Mount Leinster Rangers	1-08	11	Naomh Eoin
2	Marty Kavanagh	St Mullin's	0–11	11	Naomh Eoin
2	Craig Doyle	Bagenalstown Gaels	0–11	11	St Mullin's
2	Craig Doyle	Bagenalstown Gaels	0–11	11	Naomh Eoin
2	Ciarán Whelan	Ballinkillen	0–11	11	Bagenalstown Gaels
8	Denis Murphy	Mount Leinster Rangers	1-07	10	Bagenalstown Gaels
8	Ciarán Whelan	Ballinkillen	0–10	10	St Mullin's
10	Dwaine Kavanagh	Naomh Eoin	0-09	9	Bagenalstown Gaels
