= 2025 Carlow Senior Hurling Championship =

Annual hurling competition season

- Dates: 5 July – 24 August 2025
- Teams: 5
- Sponsor: JJ Kavanagh & Sons
- Champions: Mount Leinster Rangers (12th title); Kevin McDonald (captain); Paul O'Brien (manager)
- Runners-up: St Mullin's; Paul Doyle (captain); Tommy Buggy (manager)

Tournament statistics
- Matches played: 13
- Goals scored: 47 (3.62 per match)
- Points scored: 456 (35.08 per match)
- Top scorer(s): Chris Nolan (4–56)

The 2025 Carlow Senior Hurling Championship was the 96th staging of the Carlow Senior Hurling Championship since its establishment by the Carlow County Board in 1927. The championship ran from 5 July to 24 August 2025.

St Mullin's entered the championship as the defending champions.

The final was played on 24 August 2025 at Netwatch Cullen Park in Carlow, between Mount Leinster Rangers and St Mullin's, in what was their 12th meeting in the final overall and a third successive meeting. Mount Leinster Rangers won the match by 1–19 to 0–16 to claim their 12th championship title overall and a first title in two years.

The championship's top scorer was Chris Nolan with 4–56

== Group stage ==
=== Group stage table ===
Knockout stage

Team	Matches				Score			Pts
Team	Pld	W	D	L	For	Against	Diff	Pts
St Mullin's	4	3	0	1	112	86	26	6
Mount Leinster Rangers	4	3	0	1	125	73	52	6
Ballinkillen	4	2	0	2	96	92	4	4
Naomh Eoin	4	2	0	2	83	98	−15	4
Bagenalstown Gaels	4	0	0	4	53	120	−67	0

=== Group stage results ===
5 July 2025 Round 1	Ballinkillen	2–13 – 0–26	Mount Leinster Rangers	Netwatch Cullen Park
	C Whelan 0–7 (6fs), J Treacy1-2, P Hynes 1–1, S Murphy 0–2, E English 0–1	Report	C Nolan 0–16 (65, 13fs), D Murphy 0–3, E Byrne, T Brennan, C Fitzpatrick, E Byrne, T Lawler, J Dundon, F Fitzpatrick 0–1 each

5 July 2025 Round 1	Bagenalstown Gaels	0–10 – 2–20	Naomh Eoin	Netwatch Cullen Park
	TJ Darcy (1f), JP Treacy, J Doyle (fs), D Nolan (fs) 0–2 each, S Wall, M McDonald 0–1 each.	Report	C Abbey 0–9 (65 5fs), JM Nolan 0–6, C Quirke 1–2, J Smithers 1–1, D Kavanagh (65), M Nolan 0–1 each

11 July 2025 Round 2	Ballinkillen	0–18 – 7–17	St Mullin's	Netwatch Cullen Park
	C Whelan 0–8 (4fs), S Murphy 0–4, E English 0–3, K Kavanagh 0–2, C Wall 0–1.	Report	M Kavanagh 2–5 (1–0 pen 4fs), P Boland 3–2, C Kavanagh 1–1, John Doyle 0–4, O Ryan 1–1, L Brennan 0–2, James Doyle (Dranagh), E O’Shea 0–1 each

11 July 2025 Round 2	Mount Leinster Rangers	6–19 – 0–19	Naomh Eoin	Netwatch Cullen Park
	C Nolan 2–6 (2fs), E Byrne 2–1, D Murphy 0–4, D Dundon 1–1, T Joyce 1–0, J Nolan, D Tobin, T Brennan 0–2 each, F Fitzpatrick 0–1.	Report	C Abbey 0–10 (2-65s, 8fs), A Jordan 0–2, P Doyle, JM Nolan, J Smithers, P Abbey, C Tracey, D Dunne, E Hosey 0–1 each.

19 July 2025 Round 3	St Mullin's	1–20 – 3–13	Bagenalstown Gaels	Netwatch Cullen Park
	M Kavanagh 0–10 (9fs), J Doyle (Dranagh) 0–5, Mosie Murphy 1–0, P Boland, C Kehoe 0–2 each, J Doyle (Drummond) 0–1	Report	J Doyle 2–7 (7fs), TJ Darcy 1–4, JP Treacy, J Clarke 0–1 each

19 July 2025 Round 3	Naomh Eoin	0–13 – 1–26	Ballinkillen	Netwatch Cullen Park
	C Abbey 0–6 (fs), J Smithers 0–2, P Abbey, A Jordan, C Quirke, D Dunne, JM Nolan 0–1 each	Report	C Whelan 0–11 (8fs), S Murphy 1–3, J Treacy 0–5, E English 0–4, P Hynes 0–2, K Kavanagh 0–1

26 July 2025 Round 4	Bagenalstown Gaels	1–12 – 5–15	Ballinkillen	Netwatch Cullen Park
	J Doyle 1–5 (fs), D Nolan 0–3 (2fs), TJ Darcy 0–2, JP Treacy, C Doyle 0–1 each.	Report	J Treacy 3–2, C Wall 2–3, C Whelan (4fs), E English (1f) 0–5 each.

26 July 2025 Round 4	St Mullin's	5–14 – 1–18	Mount Leinster Rangers	Netwatch Cullen Park
	M Kavanagh 2–7 (4fs), P Boland 2–1, James Doyle (Dranagh) 1–3, E O’Shea 0–1, G Coady 0–1, John Doyle 0–1.	Report	C Nolan 1–11 (6fs, 1’65), F Fitzpatrick 0–2, E Byrne 0–2, D Tobin 0–1, T Joyce 0–1, J Nolan 0–1.

2 August 2025 Round 5	Mount Leinster Rangers	5–26 – 0–06	Bagenalstown Gaels	Netwatch Cullen Park
	T Joyce 2–4 (1f), J Nolan 1–4, R Murphy 1–4 (1f), C Nolan 0–4 (3fs), D Murphy 1–1, F Fitzpatrick 0–3, E Kealy 0–2, M Malone, J Dundon, E Doyle, K McDonald (f), 0–1 each	Report	J Doyle 0–4 (sl 3fs), JP Treacy, R O’Neill 0–1, JP Treacy 0–1 each

2 August 2025 Round 5	Naomh Eoin	1–22 – 0–22	St Mullin's	Netwatch Cullen Park
	C Abbey 0–11 (8fs), C Quirke 1–2, J M Nolan, J Kelly, P Abbey 0–2, A Jordan, D Dunne, C Tracey 0–1 each	Report	O Ryan, James Doyle, C Kehoe 0–4 each, John Doyle 0–3, P Boland, C Connolly, C Kavanagh 0–2 each, O Boland 0–1.

== Knockout stage ==
=== Semi-finals ===
9 August 2025 Semi-final	Mount Leinster Rangers	1–23 – 2–13	Ballinkillen	Netwatch Cullen Park
	C Nolan 0–9 (8fs), K McDonald 0–6 (4fs 2-65s), T Joyce 1–0, J Nolan, D Murphy 0–2 each, R Murphy, C Fitzpatrick, T Joyce, D Tobin 0–1 each	Report	C Whelan 0–7 (fs), J Treacy 0–3, C Wall, D Wall 1–0 each, E English 0–2, C Lomax 0–1.

10 August 2025 Semi-final	St Mullin's	3–23 – 0–13	Naomh Eoin	Netwatch Cullen Park
	M Kavanagh 2–10 (9fs), P Boland 1–3, C Kavanagh 0–4, John Doyle 0–2, James Doyle (Drummond), C Kehoe, O Boland, L Brennan 0–1 each	Report	C Abbey 0–5 (4fs 65), B Tracey(fs), JM Nolan 0–2 each, P Abbey, E Hosey, C Quirke, C Tracey 0–1 each

=== Final ===
24 August 2025 Final	Mount Leinster Rangers	1–19 – 0–16	St Mullin's	Netwatch Cullen Park
	C Nolan 1–10 (7fs 65), D Murphy 0–4, T Joyce 0–3, J Nolan 0–2.		M Kavanagh 0–7 (65 6fs), P Boland 0–3, P Doyle 0–2, John Doyle, J Kavanagh, C Kavanagh, J Doyle (Dranagh) 0–1 each.

== Championship statistics ==
=== Top scorers ===
Rank	Player	Club	Tally	Total	Matches	Average
1	Charis Nolan	Mount Leinster Rangers	4–56	68	6	12.33
2	Marty Kavanagh	St Mullin's	6–39	57	5	11.40
3	Ciarán Abbey	Naomh Eoin	0–41	41	5	8.20
4	Cairán Whelan	Ballinkillen	0–38	38	5	7.60
5	Paddy Boland	St Mullin's	6–13	31	6	5.16
