= 2024 Carlow Senior Hurling Championship =

Annual hurling competition season

- Dates: 21 June – 18 August 2024
- Teams: 5
- Sponsor: JJ Kavanagh & Sons
- Champions: St Mullin's (29th title); Ger Coady (captain); Tommy Buggy (manager)
- Runners-up: Mount Leinster Rangers; Kevin McDonald (captain); Paul O'Brien (manager)

Tournament statistics
- Matches played: 15
- Goals scored: 50 (3.33 per match)
- Points scored: 508 (33.87 per match)
- Top scorer(s): James Doyle (5–55)

The 2024 Carlow Senior Hurling Championship was the 95th staging of the Carlow Senior Hurling Championship since its establishment by the Carlow County Board in 1927. The championship ran from 21 June to 18 August 2024.

Mount Leinster Rangers were the defending champions.

The final, a replay, was played on 18 August 2024 at Netwatch Cullen Park in Carlow, between St Mullin's and Mount Leinster Rangers, in what was their 11th meeting in the final overall and a second successive meeting. St Mullin's won the match by 2–25 to 3–16 to claim their 29th championship title overall and a first title in two years.

James Doyle was the championship's top scorer with 5–55.

== Team changes ==
=== From championship ===
Regraded to the Carlow Intermediate Hurling Championship:

- Naomh Bríd

== Group stage ==
=== Group stage table ===
Advance to knockout stage

| Team | Matches | | | | Score | | | Pts |
| Team | Pld | W | D | L | For | Against | Diff | Pts |
|---|---|---|---|---|---|---|---|---|
| St Mullin's | 4 | 3 | 1 | 0 | 117 | 76 | 41 | 7 |
| Mount Leinster Rangers | 4 | 2 | 2 | 0 | 94 | 63 | 31 | 6 |
| Ballinkillen | 4 | 1 | 1 | 2 | 85 | 90 | −5 | 3 |
| Bagenalstown Gaels | 4 | 1 | 0 | 3 | 51 | 88 | −37 | 2 |
| Naomh Eoin | 4 | 1 | 0 | 3 | 65 | 95 | −30 | 2 |

=== Group stage results ===
| 21 June 2024 Round 1 | Mount Leinster Rangers | 2–14 – 1–17 | St Mullin's | Netwatch Cullen Park |
| | T Joyce 1–5, D Tobin 1–3, K McDonald 0–3, C Kavanagh 0–1, C Fitzpatrick 0–1, E Doyle 0–1. | Report | James Doyle 0–9, John Doyle 1–1, C Kehoe 0–2, G Coady 0–1, M Walsh 0–1, O Ryan 0–1, P Boland 0–1, J O'Neill 0–1. |

| 22 June 2024 Round 1 | Naomh Eoin | 2–15 – 1–13 | Ballinkillen | Netwatch Cullen Park |
| | C Abbey 0–5, S Tracey 1–1, D Wall 1–0 (og), B Tracey 0–3, P Abbey 0–3, M Kavanagh 0–1, M Nolan 0–1, P Doyle 0–1. | | C Whelan 1–8, S Kelly 0–1, S Murphy 0–1, J Wall 0–1, K Kavanagh 0–1, E English 0–1. |

| 29 June 2024 Round 2 | Bagenalstown Gaels | 0–17 – 0–11 | Naomh Eoin | Netwatch Cullen Park |
| | C Doyle 0–9, J Wall 0–4, D Nolan 0–2, K Guidera 0–1, J Doyle 0–1. | | C Abbey 0–7, D Dunne 0–1, S Tracey 0–1, C Tracey 0–1, M Kavanagh 0–1. |

| 29 June 2024 Round 2 | Ballinkillen | 1–17 – 0–20 | Mount Leinster Rangers | Netwatch Cullen Park |
| | C Whelan 1–9, S Kelly 0–2, S Murphy 0–2, K Kavanagh 0–1, C Wall 0–1, J Treacy 0–1, C Lomax 0–1. | | D Tobin 0–5, T Joyce 0–4, J Nolan 0–4, K McDonald 0–3, D Murphy 0–2, R Coady 0–1, C Kavanagh 0–1. |

| 6 July 2024 Round 3 | St Mullin's | 3–23 – 0–19 | Naomh Eoin | Netwatch Cullen Park |
| | James Doyle 2–10, John Doyle 1–2, C Kehoe 0–4, E O'Shea 0–2, J Kavanagh 0–2, P Walsh 0–1, O Ryan 0–1, J O'Neill 0–1. | | C Abbey 0–7, JM Nolan 0–4, C Beck 0–4, P Abbey 0–2, D Dunne 0–1, B Tracey 0–1. |

| 6 July 2024 Round 3 | Bagenalstown Gaels | 1–14 – 1–17 | Ballinkillen | Netwatch Cullen Park |
| | C Doyle 0–6, J Doyle 1–1, D Nolan 0–3, K Guidera 0–3, A Kane 0–1. | | C Whelan 0–8, K Kavanagh 1–1, P Hynes 0–3, S Murphy 0–2, C Lomax 0–2, J Treacy 0–1. |

| 13 July 2024 Round 4 | Ballinkillen | 4–17 – 3–23 | St Mullin's | Netwatch Cullen Park |
| | C Whelan 1–8, J Treacy 1–3, S Kelly 1–2, P Hynes 1–0, S Murphy 0–2, K Kavanagh 0–1, E English 0–1. | | James Doyle 0–11, M Kavanagh 3–1, C Kehoe 0–4, M Walsh 0–2, J Kavanagh 0–2, P Doyle 0–1, John Doyle 0–1, J O'Neill 0–1. |

| 13 July 2024 Round 4 | Mount Leinster Rangers | 0–24 – 0–09 | Bagenalstown Gaels | Netwatch Cullen Park |
| | T Joyce 0–10, D Tobin 0–3, J Nolan 0–3, D Murphy 0–2, E Kealy 0–1, K McDonald 0–1, E Doyle 0–1, C Kavanagh 0–1, T Lawlor 0–1, C Fitzpatrick 0–1. | | C Doyle 0–3, J McCullagh 0–2, S Wall 0–1, J Clarke 0–1, K Guidera 0–1, J Doyle 0–1. |

| 20 July 2024 Round 5 | Mount Leinster Rangers | 1–27 – 0–14 | Naomh Eoin | Netwatch Cullen Park |
| | T Joyce 1–4 (3fs), D Murphy 0–5, J Nolan, D Tobin 0–4 each, C Kavanagh 0–3, J Nolan, T Brennan 0–2 each, K McDonald (65), E Byrne, T Lawlor 0–1 each. | Report | C Abbey, C Beck 0–4 each, C Tracey 0–3, J M Nolan, S Tracey, M Kavanagh 0–1 each. |

| 20 July 2024 Round 5 | St Mullin's | 4–21 – 0–08 | Bagenalstown Gaels | Netwatch Cullen Park |
| | James Doyle 0–10 (65 6fs), John Doyle 1–5, M Kavanagh 1–2, J O’Neill 1–1, P Walsh 1–0, P Doyle, C Kehoe, O Ryan 0-1each. | Report | C Doyle (1f), Jake Doyle (1f), D Nolan (f) 0–2 each, J Clarke, K Guidera, 0–1 each. |

== Knockout stage ==
=== Semi-finals ===
| 27 July 2024 Semi-final | St Mullin's | 4–14 – 4–14 | Bagenalstown Gaels | Netwatch Cullen Park |
| | James Doyle 2–6 (5fs), M Kavanagh 1–3 (1–0 pen, 65), John Doyle 1–0, J O’Neill 0–2, M Walsh, O Ryan, J Kavanagh 0–1 each. | Report | Craig Doyle 2–7 (1-5fs 65), K Guidera 1–1, A Kane 1–0, Jake Doyle 0–3, A Corcoran, TJ Darcy, D Nolan (f) 0–1 each. |

| 27 July 2024 Semi-final | Mount Leinster Rangers | 2–19 – 1–15 | Ballinkillen | Netwatch Cullen Park |
| | J Nolan 0–5, T Joyce 0–4 (3fs), E Byrne 1–1, D Tobin 0–3, E Doyle 1–0, D Murphy 0–2 (1f), E Kealy, R Coady, C Kavanagh, C Fitzpatrick 0–1 each. | Report | C Whelan 0–5 (fs), P Hynes 1–0, C Wall, S Murphy 0–3 each, J Treacy 0–2, E English, S Kelly 0–1 each. |

| 3 August 2024 Semi-final replay | St Mullin's | 3–19 – 1–17 (aet) | Bagenalstown Gaels | Netwatch Cullen Park |
| | M Kavanagh 0-9fs, C Kehoe 2–0, O Ryan 0–3, James Doyle 1–0, P Boland, J O’Neill, J Kavanagh 0–2 each, John Doyle 0–1. | Report | Craig Doyle 0–12 (10fs), J Clarke 1–0, D Nolan 0–3 (fs), J McCullagh, J Wall 0–1 each |

=== Final ===
| 11 August 2024 Final | Mount Leinster Rangers | 2–19 – 3–16 | St Mullin's | Netwatch Cullen Park |
| | T Joyce (0–7, 4fs), E Byrne (1–2), C Kavanagh (1–0), D Murphy (0–4), J Nolan (0–3), C Nolan, T Lawlor, K McDonald (f) (0–1 each). | Report | M Kavanagh (1–8, 5fs), J Kavanagh (2–0), James Doyle (0–6), C Kehoe, J O’Neill (0–1 each). | Referee: P O'Dwyer (Palatine) |

=== Final replay ===
| 18 August 2024 Final | Mount Leinster Rangers | 3–16 – 2–25 | St Mullin's | Netwatch Cullen Park |
| | C Nolan 2–5, T Joyce 0–6 (fs), K McDonald 1–3 (all fs), Jon Nolan, D Murphy 0–1 each. | Report | M Kavanagh 1–10 (3-65s 5fs), P Boland 0–6, J O’Neill 1–3 (1-sl), James Doyle 0–3 (1f), C Kehoe 0–2, J Kavanagh 0–1. |

== Championship statistics ==
=== Top scorers ===
Overall

| Rank | Player | Club | Tally | Total | Matches | Average |
|---|---|---|---|---|---|---|
| 1 | James Doyle | St Mullin's | 5–55 | 70 | 8 | 8.75 |
| 2 | Marty Kavanagh | St Mullin's | 7–33 | 54 | 6 | 9.00 |
| 3 | Ciarán Whelan | Ballinkillen | 3–38 | 47 | 5 | 9.40 |
| 4 | Ted Joyce | Mount Leinster Rangers | 2–40 | 46 | 7 | 6.57 |
| 5 | Craig Doyle | Bagenalstown Gaels | 2–39 | 45 | 6 | 7.50 |
| 6 | Ciarán Abbey | Naomh Eoin | 0–23 | 23 | 4 | 5.75 |
| 7 | John Doyle | St Mullin's | 4–10 | 22 | 8 | 2.75 |
| 8 | Dean Tobin | Mount Leinster Rangers | 1–18 | 21 | 7 | 3.00 |
| 9 | Conor Kehoe | St Mullin's | 2–14 | 20 | 8 | 2.50 |
| 9 | Jon Nolan | Mount Leinster Rangers | 0–20 | 20 | 6 | 3.33 |

Single game

| Rank | Player | Club | Tally | Total | Opposition |
|---|---|---|---|---|---|
| 1 | James Doyle | St Mullin's | 2–10 | 16 | Naomh Eoin |
| 2 | Craig Doyle | Bagenalstown Gaels | 2-07 | 13 | St Mullin's |
| 2 | Marty Kavanagh | St Mullin's | 1–10 | 13 | Mount Leinster Rangers |
| 4 | James Doyle | St Mullin's | 2-06 | 12 | Bagenalstown Gaels |
| 4 | Ciarán Whelan | Ballinkillen | 1-09 | 12 | Mount Leinster Rangers |
| 4 | Craig Doyle | Bagenalstown Gaels | 0–12 | 12 | St Mullin's |
| 7 | Chris Nolan | Mount Leinster Rangers | 2-05 | 11 | St Mullin's |
| 7 | Ciarán Whelan | Ballinkillen | 1-08 | 11 | Naomh Eoin |
| 7 | Ciarán Whelan | Ballinkillen | 1-08 | 11 | St Mullin's |
| 7 | Marty Kavanagh | St Mullin's | 1-08 | 11 | Mount Leinster Rangers |
| 7 | James Doyle | St Mullin's | 0–11 | 11 | Ballinkillen |
