= Ger Coady =

Irish hurler

Personal information
- Native name: Gearóid Mac Oda (Irish)
- Born: 1996 (age 29–30) St Mullin's, County Carlow, Ireland

Sport
- Sport: Hurling
- Position: Centre-back
Club
- Years: Club
- 2013-present: St Mullin's
Club titles
- Carlow titles: 6
Inter-county
- Years: County
- 2015-2017: Carlow
Inter-county titles
- Leinster titles: 0
- All-Irelands: 0
- NHL: 0
- All Stars: 0

Ger Coady (born 1996) is an Irish hurler. At club level he plays with St Mullin's, while he has also lined out at inter-county level in various grades with Carlow.

== Career ==
Coady first played hurling to a high standard as a student at Borris Vocational School. He played in all grades of hurling during his tenure there.

Coady began his club hurling career at juvenile and underage levels with the St Mullin's club before progressing to adult level as a member of their intermediate team in 2013. He made his senior debut the following year and won three successive Carlow SHC titles between 2014 and 2016. Coady claimed further SHC titles in 2019, 2022 and as team captain in 2024.

Coady first appeared on the inter-county scene for Carlow as a member of the minor team in 2014. His subsequent three seasons with the under-21 team also ended without success. Coady was just out of the minor grade when he made his senior debut in the Walsh Cup in 2015. He was an unused substitute when Carlow won the Christy Ring Cup in 2017.

== Honours ==
St Mullin's

- Carlow Senior Hurling Championship: 2014, 2015, 2016, 2019, 2022, 2024 (c)

Carlow

- Christy Ring Cup: 2017
