= 2014 Carlow Senior Hurling Championship =

Annual hurling competition season

The 2014 Carlow Senior Hurling Championship is the 85th staging of the Carlow Senior Hurling Championship since its establishment by the Carlow County Board in 1927. The championship began on 11 July 2014.

Mount Leinster Rangers were the defending champions, however, they were defeated in the semi-final stages.

== Fixtures and results ==
=== Table ===
Advance to knockout stage

Team	Matches				Score			Pts
Team	Pld	W	D	L	For	Against	Diff	Pts
St Mullin's	5	3	2	0	90	63	27	8
Naomh Eoin	5	3	1	1	70	57	13	7
Mount Leinster Rangers	5	3	0	2	76	61	15	6
Erin's Own	5	2	1	2	93	75	18	5
Ballinkillen	5	2	0	3	87	93	−6	4
Naomh Bríd	5	0	0	5	5	102	−67	0

=== Round 1 ===
11 July 2014 Round 1	Mount Leinster Rangers	0–15 – 0–12	Erin's Own	Dr. Cullen Park
19:30	P Coady 0–7, D Byrne 0–3, E Doyle 0–2, J Coady, W Hickey and J Murphy 0–1 each.		J Barron 0–4, A Beaton 0–3, J Rogers and C Doyle 0–2 each, P Doyle 0–1.	Referee: P Murphy

12 July 2014 Round 1	Ballinkillen	0–13 – 2–14	Naomh Moling	Dr. Cullen Park
19:00				Referee: D Hughes

13 July 2014 Round 1	Naomh Bríd	1–8 – 0–15	Naomh Eoin	Dr. Cullen Park
19:00				Referee: P O'Dwyer

=== Round 2 ===
20 July 2014 Round 2	Naomh Moling	2–16 – 0–6	Naomh Bríd	Dr. Cullen Park
12:00				Referee: P Murphy

20 July 2014 Round 2	Erin's Own	2–13 – 3–20	BAllinkillen	Dr. Cullen Park
18:00	C Doyle 0–9, A Beaton 1–1, P Doyle 1–0, J Rogers 0–2, J Doyle 0–1.			Referee: P O'Dwyer

20 July 2014 Round 2	Naomh Eoin	1–10 – 0–6	Mount Leinster Rangers	Dr. Cullen Park
19:30			D Byrne and HP O'Byrne 0–2 each, P Coady and J Coady 0–1 each.	Referee: P Kehoe

=== Round 3 ===
16 August 2014 Round 3	Ballinkillen	1–10 – 3–13	Mount Leinster Rangers	Dr. Cullen Park
19:15			J Murphy 1–4, E Doyle 1–2, T Joyce 1–1, R Coady 0–3, HP O'Byrne, D Byrne and D Phelan 0–1 each.	Referee: D Hughes

17 August 2014 Round 3	Erin's Own	4–15 – 0–3	Naomh Bríd	Dr. Cullen Park
17:45				Referee: P Murphy

17 August 2014 Round 3	Naomh Moling	0–11 – 0–11	Naomh Eoin	Dr. Cullen Park
19:15

=== Round 4 ===
23 August 2014 Round 4	Mount Leinster Rangers	0–13 – 1–14	Naomh Moling	Dr. Cullen Park
19:00	P Coady 0–5, R Coady 0–3, J Coady, E Byrne, F Foley, D Byrne and E Coady 0–1 each.			Referee: P Kehoe

24 August 2014 Round 4	Naomh Bríd	0–9 – 1–15	Ballinkillen	Dr. Cullen Park
17:30				Referee: D Hughes

24 August 2014 Round 4	Naomh Eoin	0–8 – 2–9	Erin's Own	Dr. Cullen Park
19:00				Referee: P O'Dwyer

=== Round 5 ===
6 September 2014 Round 5	Mount Leinster Rangers	1–16 – 0–6	Naomh Bríd	Dr. Cullen Park
14:30	E Byrne 0–5, P Coady 0–4, D Phelan 1–0, D Byrne 0–3, R Coady 0–2, J Murphy and HP O'Byrne 0–1 each.			Referee: B Deering

6 September 2014 Round 5	Erin's Own	3–11 – 3–11	Naomh Moling	Spellman Park
17:45				Referee: K Kelly

6 September 2014 Round 5	Ballinkillen	0–14 – 3–14	Naomh Eoin	Dr. Cullen Park
17:45				Referee: P Kehoe

=== Semi-finals ===
5 October 2014 Semi-final	Naomh Moling	1–14 – 1–6	Erin's Own	Dr. Cullen Park
15:00

5 October 2014 Semi-final	Naomh Eoin	1–11 – 1–8	Mount Leinster Rangers	Dr. Cullen Park
16:30

=== Final ===
19 October 2014 Final	Naomh Moling	v	Naomh Eoin	Dr. Cullen Park

== Championship statistics ==
=== Miscellaneous ===
- In the semi-final between Naomh Moling and Erin's Own, four red cards are handed out, all for Erin's Own who finished with eleven players.

== Top scorers ==
Group stage

Rank	Player	Club	Tally	Total
1	Marty Kavanagh	Naomh Moling	2–38	44
2	Craig Doyle	Erin's Own	2–25	31
3	Craig Wall	Ballinkillen	1–26	29
4	David English	Ballinkillen	1–17	20
5	James Doyle	Naomh Moling	1–14	17
5	Paul Coady	Mount Leinster Rangers	0–17	17
7	Andrew Beaton	Erin's Own	2–7	13
8	John M. Nolan	Naomh Eoin	0–12	12
8	Adam Kenny	Naomh Eoin	0–12	12
9	James Kane	Naomh Bríd	0–10	10
