= 2022 Carlow Senior Hurling Championship =

Annual hurling competition season

- Dates: 17 June – 7 August 2022
- Teams: 6
- Sponsor: JJ Kavanagh & Sons
- Champions: St Mullin's (28th title); Michael Walsh (captain); Maurice Aylward (manager)
- Runners-up: Bagenalstown Gaels; Alan Corcoran (captain); Gavin Nolan (manager)

Tournament statistics
- Matches played: 18
- Goals scored: 39 (2.17 per match)
- Points scored: 536 (29.78 per match)
- Top scorer(s): Evan Kealy (3–46)

The 2022 Carlow Senior Hurling Championship was the 93rd staging of the Carlow Senior Hurling Championship since its establishment by the Carlow County Board in 1927. The draw for the opening round fixtures was made on 24 March 2022. The championship ran from 17 June to 7 August 2022.

Mount Leinster Rangers were the defending champions, however, they were beaten by Bagenalstown Gaels in the semi-final.

The final was played on 7 August 2022 at Netwatch Cullen Park in Carlow, between St Mullin's and Bagenalstown Gaels, in what was their first ever meeting in the final. St Mullin's won the match by 2–22 to 0–11 to claim their 28th championship title overall and a first title in three years.

Evan Kealy was the championship's top scorer with 3–46.

== Team changes ==
=== To championship ===
Promoted from the Carlow Intermediate Hurling Championship

- Naomh Bríd

== Group stage ==
=== Group stage table ===
Advance to knockout stage

Team	Matches				Score			Pts
Team	Pld	W	D	L	For	Against	Diff	Pts
Mount Leinster Rangers	5	5	0	0	119	67	52	10
Ballinkillen	5	4	0	1	90	72	18	8
St Mullin's	5	3	0	2	101	83	18	6
Bagenalstown Gaels	5	2	0	3	84	90	−6	4
Naomh Eoin	5	1	0	4	75	87	−12	2
Naomh Bríd	5	0	0	5	57	127	−70	0

=== Group stage results ===
17 June 2022 Round 1	St Mullin's	4–22 – 0–11	Naomh Bríd	JJ Hogan Memorial Park
	C Kehoe 1–8, J O'Neill 1–4, John Doyle 1–2, J Kavanagh 1–1, P Connors 0–3, P Boland 0–3, O Boland 0–1.		F O'Toole 0–6, A Amond 0–2, M Bambrick 0–1, S Raferty 0–1, D Kavanagh 0–1.

17 June 2022 Round 1	Ballinkillen	0–11 – 0–07	Naomh Eoin	Netwatch Cullen Park
	D English 0–7, J Treacy 0–2, K Kavanagh 0–1, P Hynes 0–1.		D Kavanagh 0–2, D Slye 0–2, C Beck 0–1, G Kavanagh 0–1, B Treacy 0–1.

18 June 2022 Round 1	Mount Leinster Rangers	2–18 – 2–05	Bagenalstown Gaels	Netwatch Cullen Park
	E Kealy 0–8, D Byrne 1–1, C Kavanagh 1–1, J Nolan 0–2, T JOyce 0–2, K McDonald 0–1, R Coady 0–1, P Coady 0–1, D Murphy 0–1.		C Doyle 1–3, P McDonnell 1–1, A Kane 0–1

24 June 2022 Round 2	Bagenalstown Gaels	2–14 – 0–15	Naomh Bríd	Netwatch Cullen Park
	C Doyle 1–5, A Kane 1–1, P McDonnell 0–3, J Clarke 0–2, N Bolger 0–1, M McDonald 0–1, R Whelan 0–1.		F O'Toole 0–7, M Bambrick 0–3, J Murphy 0–2, D Kavanagh 0–2, C Byrne 0–1.

26 June 2022 Round 2	St Mullin's	1–19 – 0–17	Naomh Eoin	Netwatch Cullen Park
	James Doyle 0–10, C Kehoe 0–4, P Boland 1–0, J O'Neill 0–2, John Doyle 0–2, P Connors 0–1.		D Kavanagh 0–12, JM Nolan 0–4, R Smithers 0–1.

26 June 2022 Round 2	Mount Leinster Rangers	1–25 – 1–13	Ballinkillen	Netwatch Cullen Park
	E Kealy 0–10, T Joyce 0–4, D Brennan 1–0, J Nolan 0–3, D Tobin 0–2, D Murphy 0–2, R Coady 0–1, C Kavanagh 0–1, G Kelly 0–1, P Coady 0–1.		D English 1–2, C Whelan 0–5, J Treacy 0–2, E Kavanagh 0–1, P Kavanagh 0–1, E Whelan 0–1, E English 0–1.

2 July 2022 Round 3	Bagenalstown Gaels	1–14 – 2–12	St Mullin's	Netwatch Cullen Park
	C Doyle 0–10, M McDonald 1–0, J Doyle 0–2, R Whelan 0–1, P McDonnell 0–1.		P Boland 0–7, C Kehoe 1–3, J O'Neill 1–1, P Connors 0–1.

3 July 2022 Round 3	Ballinkillen	1–24 – 0–11	Naomh Bríd	Netwatch Cullen Park
	C Whelan 1–11, S Murphy 0–5, D English 0–2, J Treacy 0–2, M Foley 0–1, R Dunbar 0–1, E English 0–1, P Hynes 0–1.		A Amond 0–4, F O'Toole 0–3, S Watchorn 0–1, J Murphy 0–1, M Bambrick 0–1, C Byrne 0–1.

3 July 2022 Round 3	Mount Leinster Rangers	2–17 – 0–14	Naomh Eoin	Netwatch Cullen Park
	E Kealy 1–8, D Murphy 1–2, R Coady 0–2, T Doran 0–1, D Byrne 0–1, P Coady 0–1, Dara Tobin 0–1, Dean Tobin 0–1.		D Kavanagh 0–11, JM Nolan 0–2, C Beck 0–1.

15 July 2022 Round 4	Naomh Bríd	1–08 – 2–20	Mount Leinster Rangers	Netwatch Cullen Park
	D Kavanagh 1–0, A Amond 0–2, M Bambrick 0–2, Z Kelly 0–1, J Maher 0–1, J Murphy 0–1, F O'Toole 0–1.		E Kealy 2–6, D Byrne 0–4, D Murphy 0–2, C Kavanagh 0–2, E Byrne 0–1, Dara Tobin 0–1, R Kelly 0–1, R Coady 0–1, E Byrne 0–1, P Coady 0–1.

16 July 2022 Round 4	Naomh Eoin	1–14 – 2–16	Bagenalstown Gaels	Netwatch Cullen Park
	C Tracey 0–7, JM Nolan 1–1, D Kavanagh 0–2, R Smithers 0–1, K Foley 0–1, J O'Hara 0–1, C Beck 0–1.		C Doyle 0–8, P McDonnell 1–1, J Clarke 1–1, J McCullagh 0–4, J Doyle 0–1, A Kane 0–1.

16 July 2022 Round 4	St Mullin's	1–09 – 2–14	Ballinkillen	Netwatch Cullen Park
	C Kehoe 0–5, P Boland 1–1, J O'Neill 0–2, J Kavanagh 0–1.		C Whelan 0–6, M Foley 1–2, P Kavanagh 1–0, S Murphy 0–2, D English 0–1, J Treacy 0–1, E Kavanagh 0–1, C Lomax 0–1.

23 July 2022 Round 5	Ballinkillen	0–16 – 0–14	Bagenalstown Gaels	Netwatch Cullen Park
	C Whelan 0–11, J Treacy 0–3, P Hynes 0–1, S Murphy 0–1.		J Doyle 0–6, JP Tracey 0–2, J McCullagh 0–2, B Doyle 0–1, R Whelan 0–1, M McDonald 0–1, D Doyle 0–1.

23 July 2022 Round 5	Mount Leinster Rangers	1–15 – 0–15	St Mullin's	Netwatch Cullen Park
	E Kealy 0–7, F Fitzpatrick 1–0, D Murphy 0–3, P Coady 0–3, D Byrne 0–1, K McDonald 0–1.		C Kehoe 0–8, J O'Neill 0–3, John Doyle 0–2, P Connors 0–1, P Boland 0–1.

23 July 2022 Round 5	Naomh Eoin	2–14 – 0–09	Naomh Bríd	JJ Hogan Memorial Park
	K Foley 2–0, C Treacy 0–5, C Beck 0–2, JM Nolan 0–2, E Hosey 0–2, B Treacy 0–1, A Kenny 0–1, D Slye 0–1.		A Amond 0–4, F O'Toole 0–3, M Bambrick 0–1, F O'Byrne 0–1.

== Knockout stage ==
=== Semi-finals ===
31 July 2022 Semi-final	Bagenalstown Gaels	2–18 – 1–18	Mount Leinster Rangers	Netwatch Cullen Park
	C Doyle 0–8, J Clarke 1–1, J Doyle 1–0, D Doyle 0–3, M McDonald 0–2, A Corcoran 0–2, JP Tracey 0–1, A Whelan 0–1.		E Kealy 0–7, T Joyce 0–4, E Byrne 1–0, D Murphy 0–3, K McDonald 0–2, J Nolan 0–2.

31 July 2022 Semi-final	St Mullin's	2–16 – 1–18	Ballinkillen	Netwatch Cullen Park
	C Kehoe 0–5, P Boland 1–1, John Doyle 1–1, James Doyle 0–2, P Connors 0–2, J Kavanagh 0–2, J O'Neill 0–2, G Coady 0–1.		C Whelan 0–7, C Wall 1–1, S Murphy 0–4, J Treacy 0–3, M Foley 0–1, D English 0–1, R Dunbar 0–1.

=== Final ===
7 August 2022 Final	St Mullin's	2–22 – 0–11	Bagenalstown Gaels	Netwatch Cullen Park
	J O’Neill (2–6), James Doyle (0–7 2fs); M Kavanagh (0–3 2fs), P Boland (0–2), John Doyle (0–2), G Coady (0–1); P Connors (0–1).	Report	C Doyle (0–4 3fs), J McCullagh (0–3), JP Tracey (0–2); M McDonald (0–2).	Referee: P Murphy (Ballinkillen)

== Championship statistics ==
=== Top scorers ===
Overall

Rank	Player	Club	Tally	Total	Matches	Average
1	Evan Kealy	Mount Leinster Rangers	3–46	55	6	9.16
2	Craig Doyle	Bagenalstown Gaels	2–38	44	6	7.33
3	Ciarán Whelan	Ballinkillen	1–40	43	5	8.60
4	Conor Kehoe	St Mullin's	2–33	39	7	5.57
5	Jason O'Neill	St Mullin's	4–20	32	7	4.57
6	Dylan Kavanagh	Naomh Eoin	0–27	27	4	6.75
7	Paddy Boland	St Mullin's	3–15	24	7	3.42
8	Fiach O'Toole	Naomh Bríd	0–20	20	5	4.00
9	James Doyle	St Mullin's	0–19	19	7	2.71
10	David English	Ballinkillen	0–19	19	6	3.16

In a single game

Rank	Player	Club	Tally	Total	Opposition
1	Ciarán Whelan	Ballinkillen	1–11	14	Naomh Bríd
2	Evan Kealy	Mount Leinster Rangers	2-06	12	Naomh Bríd
2	Jason O'Neill	St Mullin's	2-06	12	Bagenalstown Gaels
2	Dylan Kavanagh	Naomh Eoin	0–12	12	St Mullin's
5	Conor Kehoe	St Mullin's	1-08	11	Naomh Bríd
5	Evan Kealy	Mount Leinster Rangers	1-08	11	Naomh Eoin
5	Dylan Kavanagh	Naomh Eoin	0–11	11	Mount Leinster Rangers
5	Ciarán Whelan	Ballinkillen	0–11	11	Bagenalstown Gaels
9	James Doyle	St Mullin's	0–10	10	Naomh Eoin
9	Evan Kealy	Mount Leinster Rangers	0–10	10	Ballinkillen
9	Craig Doyle	Bagenalstown Gaels	0–10	10	St Mullin's
