= Martin Kavanagh (hurler) =

Irish hurler (born 1994)

Personal information
- Native name: Máirtín Caomhánach (Irish)
- Nickname: Mouse
- Born: 15 September 1994 (age 32) St Mullin's, County Carlow, Ireland

Sport
- Sport: Hurling
- Position: Centre-forward
Club
- Years: Club
- St Mullin's
Club titles
- Carlow titles: 6
College
- Years: College
- Institute of Technology, Carlow
College titles
- Fitzgibbon titles: 0
Inter-county*
Years	County	Apps (scores)
2012-present	Carlow	54 (24-400)
Inter-county titles
- Leinster titles: 0
- All-Irelands: 0
- NHL: 0
- All Stars: 0
- *Inter County team apps and scores correct as of match played 6 June 2026.

Martin Kavanagh (born 15 September 1994) is an Irish hurler. At club level he plays with St Mullin's and at inter-county level with the Carlow senior hurling team. He usually lines out as a centre-forward. He is Carlow's all-time top scorer. Kavanagh is widely regarded as the greatest hurler his county has ever produced as well as being one of the greatest free-takers to ever play the game.

== Early life ==
Born and raised in the St Mullin's are of County Carlow, Kavanagh's brother Jack is also a hurler who plays his club hurling with St. Mullin's and formerly with the Carlow senior inter-county team. Kavanagh first played hurling as a schoolboy with Borris Vocational School in various competitions. He later lined out with Institute of Technology, Carlow and won an All-Ireland Freshers' Hurling League title after a defeat of University College Cork in 2013. Kavanagh returned to IT Carlow almost a decade later and was their top scorer in the 2022 Fitzgibbon Cup.

== Club career ==
Kavanagh began his club career at juvenile and underage levels with the St Mullin's club. He had a number of successes, beginning with a Carlow U16HC title before later claiming a Carlow MHC title after scoring 1–08 against Naomh Eoin in the 2011 minor final. Kavanagh ended his underage career by winning a Carlow U21HC title in 2014.

By that stage Kavanagh had already joined the club's senior team and was top scorer when St Mullin's were beaten by Mount Leinster Rangers in the 2013 final. He continued to be the club's scorer-in-chief as St Mullin's won three consecutive Carlow SHC titles after defeats of Naomh Eoin in 2014 and Mount Leinster Rangers in 2015 and 2016.

After losing the 2018 final to Mount Leinster Rangers, Kavanagh collected a fourth winners' medal as captain when St Mullin's overcame Mount Leinster Rangers in the 2019 final. He ended the season by scoring 0–12 in a defeat by Ballyhale Shamrocks in the 2019 Leinster Club SHC final.

Kavanagh made a further three final appearances between 2021 and 2023 and claimed a fifth winners' medal after beating Bagenalstown Gaels in the 2022 final.

== Inter-county career ==
Kavanagh began his inter-county career with Carlow during a two-year tenure with the minor team in 2011 and 2012. He was the team's top scorer both seasons with a cumulative total of 2-40. Kavanagh was in his final year with the minor team when he was drafted onto the under-21 team. His four seasons in this grade ended without success.

Kavanagh was just 17-years-old and still eligible for the minor side when he made his senior team debut in a National League defeat of Down in 2012. He ended that campaign with a Division 2A title after beating Westmeath by 1–14 to 0–12 in the final. Kavanagh was appointed team captain in advance of the 2017 season. He ended the year with a Christy Ring Cup winners' medal after a 5–23 to 4–15 defeat of Antrim in the final.

Kavanagh added a second Division 2A medal to his collection after another defeat of Westmeath in 2018. He played in the early stages of that year's Joe McDonagh Cup but later spent the summer if the United States and missed the defeat of Westmeath in the final.

Kavanagh immediately rejoined the team after returning and was named on the Joe McDonagh Cup Team of the Year in 2022. He became Carlow's all-time top scorer during the 2023 National League. Kavanagh was top scorer when Carlow claimed the Joe McDonagh Cup title after a 2–29 to 1–31 defeat of Offaly in the 2023 final. Kavanagh ended the season by being named on the Team of the Year for a second successive year.

== Career statistics ==
As of match played 26 May 2024.

Team	Year	National League			Ring Cup		McDonagh Cup		Leinster		All-Ireland		Total	
Team	Year	Division	Apps	Score	Apps	Score	Apps	Score	Apps	Score	Apps	Score	Apps	Score
Carlow	2012	Division 2A	5	1-12	—		—		1	0-07	1	0-08	7	1-27
Carlow	2013	Division 1B	4	0-23	—		—		2	0-11	1	0-00	7	0-34
Carlow	2014	Division 2A	6	3-20	—		—		4	3-06	—		10	6-26
Carlow	2015	Division 2A	5	2-28	—		—		3	1-16	—		8	3-44
Carlow	2016	Division 2A	4	1-12	—		—		2	0-08	—		6	1-20
Carlow	2017	Division 2A	5	0-13	5	4-13	—		—		—		10	4-26
Carlow	2018	Division 2A	6	3-27	—		1	0-01	—		—		7	3-28
Carlow	2019	Division 1B	6	0-49	—		—		4	0-33	—		10	0-82
Carlow	2020	Division 1B	6	1-35	—		4	1-31	—		—		10	2-66
Carlow	2021	Division 2A	5	4-60	—		0	0-00	—		—		5	4-60
Carlow	2022	Division 2A	3	0-21	—		5	2-49	—		—		8	2-70
Carlow	2023		4	0-26	—		6	3-71	—		1	0-12	11	3-109
Carlow	2024		6	4-46	—		—		5	1-46	—		11	5-92
Total			65	19-372	5	4-13	16	6-152	21	5-127	3	0-20	110	34-684

== Honours ==
=== Team ===
Institute of Technology, Carlow

- All-Ireland Freshers' Hurling League: 2013

St Mullin's

- Carlow Senior Hurling Championship: 2014, 2015, 2016, 2019 (c), 2022, 2024
- Carlow Under-21 Hurling Championship: 2014
- Carlow Minor Hurling Championship: 2011

Carlow

- Joe McDonagh Cup: 2023
- Christy Ring Cup: 2017 (c)
- National Hurling League Division 2A: 2012, 2018

=== Individual ===
Awards

- Joe McDonagh Cup Team of the Year: 2022, 2023
- Club Hurling Team of the Year: 2020
- Higher Education Rising Stars Team of the Year: 2018
- Carlow Hurler of the Year: 2014, 2015, 2019

Sporting positions
Preceded by Séamus Murphy; Alan Corcoran	Carlow Senior Hurling Captain; 2017	Succeeded by Diarmuid Byrne
Achievements
Preceded by James Toher	Christy Ring Cup Final winning captain 2017	Succeeded by Brian Byrne
