= 2026 Carlow Senior Hurling Championship =

Annual hurling competition season

The 99th Carlow Senior Hurling Championship
- Dates: 27 June – 27 September 2026
- Teams: 6
- Sponsor: JJ Kavanagh & Sons
- Champions: Mount Leinster Rangers (13th title); Richard Coady (captain); Niall Bergin (manager)
- Runners-up: St Mullin's; Ger Coady (captain); Sean O'Meara (manager)
- Relegated: N/A

Tournament statistics
- Matches played: 18
- Goals scored: 61 (3.39 per match)
- Points scored: 600 (33.33 per match)
- Top scorer(s): Conor Kehoe (5-54)

The 2026 Carlow Senior Hurling Championship is the 99th staging of the Carlow Senior Hurling Championship since its establishment by the Carlow County Board in 1927. The championship runs from 27 June to 27 September 2026.

Mount Leinster Rangers enters the championship as the defending champion.

Mount Leinster Rangers defended their championship after defeating St Mullin's with 3-16 to 1-18 in the final.

== Format change ==
The number of teams is increased to 6 teams. The previous format of finishing the Hurling season before the start of the Gaelic football season does no longer exist and the games are instead spread out over the summer. The first four teams advance to a semi-final stage.

== Group stage ==
=== Group stage table ===
Advance to semi-finals

Team	Matches				Score			Pts
Team	Pld	W	D	L	For	Against	Diff	Pts
Mount Leinster Rangers	5	5	0	0	161	72	89	10
Ballinkillen	5	3	0	2	116	101	15	6
St Mullin's	5	3	0	2	120	106	14	6
Bagenalstown Gaels	5	2	0	3	81	114	-33	4
Naomh Eoin	5	1	0	4	88	118	-30	2
Naomh Bríd	5	1	0	4	86	141	-55	2

=== Group stage results ===
27 June 2026 Round 1	Bagenalstown Gaels	1-18 – 1-12	Naomh Eoin	Carlow
17:00	J Doyle 0-11 (7fs), P McDonnell 1-2, J Wall, P Abbey 0-2 each, D Doyle 0-1 each.	Report	A Jordan 0-6 (fs), S Tracey 1-2, C Quirke, E Hosey, J Smithers, C Kavanagh 0-1 each.	Stadium: Netwatch Cullen Park; Referee: David Hickey

27 June 2026 Round 1	Mount Leinster Rangers	5-22 – 2-06	Naomh Bríd	Carlow
18:30	J Nolan 2-3, P Coady 0-7 (6fs), F Fitzpatrick, D Murphy, T Joyce 1-1 each, D Byrne, K Nolan 0-3 each, J Dundon 0-2, R Coady 0-1.	Report	M Bambrick, T Donovan 1-0 each, J Kehoe 0-3 (1f 65), C Twomey, F O’Toole, T O’Neill 0-1 each.	Stadium: Netwatch Cullen Park; Referee: Conor Daly

28 June 2026 Round 1	St Mullin's	2-16 – 1-27	Ballinkillen	Bagenalstown
14:00	J Doyle 1-8 (65 5fs), C Kehoe 0-3, G Bennett 1-0, John Doyle 0-2, O Ryan, E Doyle, J Kavanagh 0-1 each.	Report	C Whelan 1-15 (65 13fs), E English 0-4, C Lomax, M Dalton 0-2 each, K Kavanagh, C Wall, P Hynes, J Treacy 0-1 each.	Stadium: McGrath Park; Referee: Sean McCormack

3 July 2026 Round 2	Bagenalstown Gaels	0-13 – 1-29	Mount Leinster Rangers	Carlow
19:30	J Doyle 0-6 (5fs), TJ Darcy (2-sl), P McDonnell 0-3 each, P Abbey 0-1.	Report	P Coady 0-8 (7fs), T Joyce 1-3, Jon Nolan, D Murphy, R Coady, K McDonald 0-3 each, Jamie Nolan 0-1, T Brennan, K Nolan, D Byrne, D Tobin, J Dundon 0-1 each.	Stadium: Netwatch Cullen Park; Referee: David Hickey

4 July 2026 Round 2	Ballinkillen	4-15 – 1-12	Naomh Bríd	Carlow
17:00	P Hynes 2-2, C Wall 1-2, C Whelan 0-5 (4fs 65), J Treacy 1-1, E English 0-3, C Meaney, C Lomax 0-1 each.	Report	A Amond 0-5 (1f), C Twomey 1-0, F O’Toole 0-2 (fs), J Murphy, M Fitzgerald, B Daly, J Maher, J Connolly 0-1 each.	Stadium: Netwatch Cullen Park; Referee: Brian Deering

4 July 2026 Round 2	St Mullin's	3-15 – 0-12	Naomh Eoin	Carlow
18:30	C Kehoe 1-7 (5fs), E Doyle, C Kavanagh 1-0 each, P Boland 0-3, M Walsh 0-2, G Coady, John Doyle, Sean Doyle 0-1 each.	Report	J M Nolan 0-3 (fs), S Smithers, B Tracey (fs), P Doyle (1f), C Beck 0-2 each, D Jordan 0-1.	Stadium: Netwatch Cullen Park; Referee: Sean McCormack

10 July 2026 Round 3	St Mullin's	4-21 – 1-12	Naomh Bríd	Bagenalstown
19:30	C Kehoe 2-11 (6fs), P Boland 1-4, C Kavanagh 1-1, G Bennett, E Doyle, P Kehoe, P O’Shea, M Walsh, E O’Shea 0-1 each.	Report	A Amond 1-5 (3fs), F O’Toole 0-3 (1f), J Connolly 0-2, B Daly, M Bambrick 0-1 each.	Stadium: McGrath Park; Referee: Patrick Murphy

11 July 2026 Round 3	Mount Leinster Rangers	0-27 – 0-16	Naomh Eoin	Carlow
17:00	P Coady (3fs), D Tobin, R Coady, E Kealy, F Fitzpatrick 0-3 each, D Byrne. D Murphy, K Nolan, Jamie Nolan 0-2, K McDonald (f), Jon Nolan, C Nolan (f), J Dundon 0-1 each.	Report	C Quirke 0-4, J M Nolan (1f), C Beck 0-3 each, B Tracey (fs) 0-2, D Kavanagh, S Tracey, C Abbey (f), E Hosey 0-1 each.	Stadium: Netwatch Cullen Park; Referee: Jonathan Murphy

11 July 2026 Round 3	Ballinkillen	1-13 – 2-13	Bagenalstown Gaels	Carlow
18:30	C Whelan 1-10 (8fs 65), J Treacy, C Wall, D Wall (f) 0-1 each.	Report	Jake Doyle 0-8 (7fs), TJ Darcy 1-3, P McDonnell 1-0, Cian Doyle, J Clarke 0-1 each.	Stadium: Netwatch Cullen Park; Referee: Paud O'Dwyer

8 August 2026 Round 4	Naomh Eoin	2-13 – 4-15	Ballinkillen	Carlow
17:30	JM Nolan 2-9 (2-7f), M Nolan, S Tracey, K Foley and J Smithers 0-1 each.	Report	C Whelan 1-6 (0-3f), C Wall 2-3, P Hynes 1-0, C O'Neill, M Dalton, K Kavanagh, M Foley, J Treacy and E English 0-1 each.	Stadium: Netwatch Cullen Park; Referee: Sean McCormack

8 August 2026 Round 4	St Mullin's	0-15 – 5-24	Mount Leinster Rangers	Carlow
19:00	C Kehoe 0-8 (6f, 1'65), James Doyle 0-3, M Walsh 0-2, P Boland and John Doyle 0-1 each.	Report	C Nolan 3-6 (0-1f, 0-1'65), Jamie Nolan 1-3, K Nolan 1-2, P Coady 0-3, D Murphy, F Fitzpatrick and J Dundon 0-2 each, Jon Nolan, K McDonald (s), T Joyce and R Coady 0-1 each.	Stadium: Netwatch Cullen Park; Referee: Patrick Murphy

9 August 2026 Round 4	Naomh Bríd	1-22 – 1-15	Bagenalstown Gaels	Carlow
18:00	A Amond 1-6 (0-3f), F O’Toole 0-4 (4f), J Connolly 0-4, M Fitzgerald 0-3, M Bambrick 0-2, E Holland 0-1, T O’Donovan 0-1, C Twomey 0-1.	Report	Jake Doyle 0-6 (4f), P McDonnell 1-2, TJ Darcy 0-2, S Wall 0-2, J Clarke, J Wall, Craig Doyle 0-1 each.	Stadium: Netwatch Cullen Park; Referee: Jonathan Murphy

14 August 2026 Round 5	Mount Leinster Rangers	1-23 – 2-10	Ballinkillen	Carlow
19:30	C Nolan 0-8 (5fs), Jamie Nolan 1-2, D Murphy 0-4, Jon Nolan 0-4, T Joyce 0-2, J Dundon, P Coady, D Tobin (f) 0-1 each.	Report	C Whelan 0-7 (5fs), M Dalton 1-0, A Ryan 1-0, J Treacy 0-2, S Whelan 0-1.	Stadium: Netwatch Cullen Park; Referee: Brian Deering

15 August 2026 Round 5	Naomh Bríd	0-19 – 2-20	Naomh Eoin	Fenagh
18:00	F O'Toole 0-7 (7f), A Amond 0-6 (5f), M Bambrick 0-3 (1f), M Fitzgerald 0-2, J Connolly 0-1.	Report	JM Nolan 0-9 (6f), C Beck 0-4, A Kenny and S Tracey 1-1 each, E Hosey, M Kavanagh, C Quirke, C Abbey and J Smithers 0-1 each.	Stadium: Carlow GAA Centre of Excellence; Referee: David Hickey

15 August 2026 Round 5	St Mullin's	3-17 – 0-10	Bagenalstown Gaels	Carlow
18:00	C Kehoe 1-9 (8fs), P Boland, G Bennett 1-0 each, C Kavanagh, James Doyle, P Doyle 0-2 each, M Kavanagh, G Coady 0-1 each.	Report	Jake Doyle 0-7 (65 5fs), TJ Darcy, P Abbey, D Doyle 0-1 each.	Stadium: Netwatch Cullen Park; Referee: Paud O’Dwyer

== Knockout stage ==
=== Semi-finals ===
6 September 2026 Semi-final	Ballinkillen	0-14 - 3-21	St Mullin's	Carlow
14:15	C Whelan 0-9 (6fs), K Kavanagh 0-2, S Whelan, S Murphy, P Hynes 0-1 each.	Report	P Boland 2-3, C Kehoe 0-6 (4fs), James Doyle 0-6, John Doyle 1-1, P Doyle 0-2, M Kavanagh 0-2, J Kavanagh 0-1.	Stadium: Netwatch Cullen Park; Referee: Paud O’Dwyer

6 September 2026 Semi-final	Mount Leinster Rangers	2-18 - 2-11	Bagenalstown Gaels	Carlow
16:00	C Nolan 2-8 (4fs), Jon Nolan 0-3, D Murphy, R Murphy (2fs), 0-2 each, T Joyce 0-1, E Byrne, Jamie Nolan 0-1 each.	Report	Jake Doyle 1-8 (1-0 pen 6fs), Craig Doyle 1-0, J Wall 0-2, S Wall 0-1.	Stadium: Netwatch Cullen Park; Referee: Conor Daly

=== Final ===
27 September 2026 Final	Mount Leinster Rangers	3-16 - 1-18	St Mullin's	Carlow
	Chris Nolan 3-06 (including 1 penalty, 3 frees), Richard Coady 0-02, Joe Dundon 0-02, Donagh Murphy 0-02, Ted Joyce 0-02, Ruairi Murphy 0-01, Jamie Nolan 0-01	Report	Conor Kehoe 1-10 (8 frees), Marty Kavanagh 0-04 (2 frees), Paddy Boland 0-02, James Doyle 0-01, John Doyle 0-01	Stadium: Netwatch Cullen Park; Referee: TBC
