= 2021 Carlow Senior Hurling Championship =

Annual hurling competition season

- Dates: 6 August – 19 September 2021
- Teams: 5
- Sponsor: JJ Kavanagh & Sons
- Champions: Mount Leinster Rangers (10th title); Michael Doyle (captain); Conor Phelan (manager)
- Runners-up: St Mullin's; Niall O'Donnell (manager)

The 2021 Carlow Senior Hurling Championship was the 92nd staging of the Carlow Senior Hurling Championship since its establishment by the Carlow County Board in 1927. The championship began on 6 August 2021 and ended on 19 September 2021.

Mount Leinster Rangers entered the championship as the defending champions.

The final was played on 19 September 2021 at Netwatch Cullen Park, between Mount Leinster Rangers and St Mullin's, in what was their first ever meeting in a final in two years. Mount Leinster Rangers won the match by 0–24 to 0–16 to claim their 10th championship title overall and a second title in succession.

== Results ==
=== Semi-finals ===
12 September 2021 Semi-final	St Mullin's	2–14 – 1–11	Bagenalstown Gaels	Netwatch Cullen Park
	M Kavanagh 1–9, P Boland 1–2, C Kehoe 0–2, J Doran 0–1.	Report	C Doyle 0–6, Jake Doyle 1–1, James Doyle 0–1, J McCullagh 0–1, A Kane 0–1.

12 September 2021 Semi-final	Mount Leinster Rangers	0–17 – 0–07	Naomh Eoin	Netwatch Cullen Park
	D Murphy 0–8, C Nolan 0–3, C Kavanagh 0–2, K McDonald 0–1, E Byrne 0–1, G Kelly 0–1.	Report	D Sly 0–2, D Kavanagh 0–2, J Smithers 0–1.

=== Final ===
19 September 2021 Final	Mount Leinster Rangers	0–24 – 0–16	St Mullin's	Netwatch Cullen Park
	C Nolan 0–7, J Nolan 0–5, D Murphy 0–4 (1f), E Byrne 0–4, F Fitzpatrick 0–2, K McDonald, T Lawlor, 0–1 each.	Report	M Kavanagh 0–8 (5fs), O Ryan, P O’Shea 0–2 each, J Kavanagh 0–1, J O’Neill, C Kehoe, J Doyle 0–1 each.	Referee: J Hickey
