= Niall Bolger =

Irish hurler (born 2002)

Personal information
- Native name: Niall Ó Bolguir (Irish)
- Born: 2002 (age 23–24) Bagenalstown, County Carlow, Ireland
- Occupation: Student

Sport
- Sport: Hurling
- Position: Left corner-back
Club
- Years: Club
- 2000-present: Bagenalstown Gaels
Club titles
- Carlow titles: 0
College
- Years: College
- 2021-present: Maynooth University
College titles
- Fitzgibbon titles: 0
Inter-county
- Years: County
- 2022-present: Carlow
Inter-county titles
- Leinster titles: 0
- All-Irelands: 0
- NHL: 0
- All Stars: 0

Niall Bolger (born 2002) is an Irish hurler. At club level he plays with Bagenalstown Gaels and at inter-county level with the Carlow senior hurling team.

== Career ==
Bolger began his club career at juvenile and underage levels with the Muinebheag club, before progressing to adult level with the newly-formed Bagenalstown Gaels club in 2020. He was a Carlow SHC runner-up in 2022 after Bagenalstown Gaels was defeated by St Mullin's in the final. Bolger has also lined out with Maynooth University in the Fitzgibbon Cup.

Bolger began his inter-county career with Carlow during a two-year tenure with the minor team in 2018 and 2019. He was part of the team that beat Meath to claim the Leinster MH Shield title in his final year as a minor. He was immediately drafted onto the under-20 team, however, his three seasons in this grade ended without success. Bolger claimed a Joe McDonagh Cup winners' medal after a 2–29 to 1–31 defeat of Offaly in the 2023 final.

== Honours ==
Carlow

- Joe McDonagh Cup: 2023
