= 2015 Carlow Senior Hurling Championship =

Annual hurling competition season

- Dates: 11 July 2015 – 18 October 2015
- Teams: 6
- Sponsor: JJ Kavanagh and Sons
- Champions: St. Mullin's (25th title); Paudie Kehoe (captain); Anthony McCormack (manager)
- Runners-up: Mount Leinster Rangers; Éamonn Scallan (manager)

The 2015 Carlow Senior Hurling Championship was the 86th staging of the Carlow Senior Hurling Championship since its establishment by the Carlow County Board in 1887. The championship began on 11 July 2015 and ended on 18 October 2015.

St. Mullin's were the defending champions.

On 18 October 2015, St. Mullin's won the championship following a 1–14 to 0–10 defeat of Mount Leinster Rangers in the final. This was their 25th championship title, their second in succession.

== Results ==
=== Semi-finals ===
4 October 2015 Semi-final	St. Mullin's	1–17 – 2–11	Ballinkillen	Netwatch Cullen Park

4 October 2015 Semi-final	Mount Leinster Rangers	5–15 – 1–7	Naomh Eoin	Netwatch Cullen Park

=== Final ===
18 October 2015 Final	St. Mullin's	1–14 – 0–10	Mount Leinster Rangers	Netwatch Cullen Park
