= Chris Nolan (hurler) =

Irish hurler born 1998

Personal information
- Native name: Criostóir Ó Nualláin (Irish)
- Born: 29 May 1998 (age 28) Rathanna, County Carlow, Ireland

Sport
- Sport: Hurling
- Position: Centre-forward
Club
- Years: Club
- Mount Leinster Rangers
Club titles
- Carlow titles: 7
Inter-county
- Years: County
- 2017-present: Carlow
Inter-county titles
- Leinster titles: 0
- All-Irelands: 0
- NHL: 0
- All Stars: 0

Chris Nolan (born 29 May 1998) is an Irish hurler who plays as a centre-forward at club level with Mount Leinster Rangers and at inter-county level for the Carlow senior team. Nolan was appointed as the Carlow captain for the 2026 season.

Born in Rathanna, County Carlow, Nolan first played competitive hurling at Borris Vocational School. He simultaneously came to prominence at juvenile and underage levels with the Mount Leinster Rangers club, winning four successive minor championship medals. Nolan subsequently played with the Mount Leinster Rangers senior team, winning a county championship medal in 2017.

Nolan made his debut on the inter-county scene when he was selected for the Carlow minor team in 2014. He played for three championship seasons with the minor team, before later joining the Carlow under-21 team. Nolan made his senior debut during the 2017 league.

== Career statistics ==
As of match played 24 March 2018.

Team	Year	National League			McDonagh Cup		Ring Cup		Total	
Team	Year	Division	Apps	Score	Apps	Score	Apps	Score	Apps	Score
Carlow	2017	Division 2A	6	2-09	0	0-00	5	0-07	11	2-16
Carlow	2018	Division 2A	6	2-18	0	0-00	0	0-00	6	2-18
Total			12	4-27	0	0-00	5	0-07	17	4-34

== Honours ==
Carlow

- Joe McDonagh Cup (2): 2018, 2023
- National Hurling League Division 2A (1): 2018

Mount Leinster Rangers

- Carlow Senior Hurling Championship (7): 2017, 2018, 2020, 2021, 2023, 2025, 2026
- Carlow Minor Hurling Championship (4): 2013, 2014, 2015, 2016
