= 2019 Carlow Senior Hurling Championship =

Annual hurling competition season

- Teams: 4
- Sponsor: JJ Kavanagh & Sons
- Champions: St Mullin's (27th title); Marty Kavanagh (captain); Niall O'Donnell (manager)
- Runners-up: Mount Leinster Rangers; David Phelan (captain)

The 2019 Carlow Senior Hurling Championship was the 90th staging of the Carlow Senior Hurling Championship since its establishment by the Carlow County Board in 1927. The draw for the opening round fixtures took place on 27 February 2019.

Mount Leinster Rangers entered the championship as the defending champions.

The final was played on 20 October 2019 at Netwatch Cullen Park, between St Mullin's and Mount Leinster Rangers, in what was their eighth meeting in the final overall and a second successive meeting. St Mullin's won the match by 2–17 to 1–19 to claim their 27th championship title overall and a first title in three years.

== Group stage ==
=== Group stage results ===
7 September 2019 Round 3	St Mullin's	1–21 – 1–13	Naomh Eoin	Spellman Park
	S Murphy 1–3, M Kavanagh 0–6, J Kavanagh 0–3, P Connors 0–3, J Doyle 0–2, G Coady 0–1, P Walsh 0–1, J O'Neill 0–1.		D Kavanagh 0–6, JM Nolan 1–0, P Nolan 0–3, R Smithers 0–1, E Nolan 0–1, E Hosey 0–1, B Treacy 0–1.

7 September 2019 Round 3	Mount Leinster Rangers	2–14 – 1–16	Ballinkillen	Netwatch Cullen Park
	D Murphy 0–7, E Byrne 1–1, T Joyce 1–1, C Nolan 0–3, D Byrne 0–1, K McDonald 0–1.		C Whelan 0–8, C Wall 1–1, S Murphy 0–4, R Dunbar 0–1, P Hynes 0–1, D Sheehan 0–1.

== Knockout stage ==
=== Semi-final ===
12 October 2019 Semi-final	St Mullin's	3–19 – 1–19 (aet)	Ballinkillen	Netwatch Cullen Park
	M Kavanagh 1–7, J Doyle 0–8,	Report	C Whelan 0–11.

=== Final ===
20 October 2019 Final	St Mullin's	2–17 – 1–19	Mount Leinster Rangers	Netwatch Cullen Park
	M Kavanagh (0–10, 0–5 frees); S Murphy (1–1), P Boland (1–1), J Doyle (0–3), J O’Neill (0–2).		D Murphy (1–13, 0–13 frees), C Nolan (0–2), J Nolan (0–2), T Joyce (0–1), D Byrne (0–1).	Referee: P O'Dwyer (Palatine)
