= Pat English =

Carlow hurler

Pat English is an Irish former hurler who played at senior level for the Carlow county team. He is former manager of the Carlow senior team.

Born in Ballinkillin, County Carlow, English first played competitive hurling in his youth. He played senior hurling with Carlow, and was a member of the team that won the All-Ireland title in the "B" grade in 1992. At club level English played with Ballinkillen.

His father, Jim English, was a three-time All-Ireland medallist and an All-Ireland-winning-captain with Wexford.

In retirement from playing English became involved in team management and coaching. He took charge of a number of club teams before being appointed manager of the Carlow senior team on 22 September 2014, having previously taken charge of the Carlow under-21 team.

== Career statistics ==
=== Manager ===
As of match played 1 May 2016.

Team	From	To	Walsh Cup				National League				Leinster				All-Ireland				Total				
Team	From	To	G	W	D	L	G	W	D	L	G	W	D	L	G	W	D	L	G	W	D	L	Win %
Carlow	22 September 2014	18 August 2016	5	2	0	3	11	7	0	4	6	1	0	5	0	0	0	0	20	10	0	10	50

Sporting positions
Preceded by Paul Flynn	Carlow Under-21 Hurling Manager; 2012–2016	Succeeded by TBA
Preceded by John Meyler	Carlow Senior Hurling Manager; 2014–2016	Succeeded by Colm Bonnar
