= Johnny Nevin =

Irish hurler and Gaelic footballer

Personal information
- Native name: Seán Mac Naoimhín (Irish)
- Born: Leighlinbridge, County Carlow

Sport
- Football Position: Centre Forward
- Hurling Position: Centre Back
Clubs
- Years: Club
- 1989 – present 1989 – present: Old Leighlin; Naomh Bríd
Club titles
	Football	Hurling
Carlow titles	2	3
Leinster titles		0
Inter-county
- Years: County
- 1989–2004 1988–2004: Carlow (H); Carlow (F)

Johnny Nevin is a former dual player from County Carlow, Ireland. He played Gaelic football and hurling with Carlow between the late 1980s and the 2000s.

Nevin won an All-Ireland B Football medal in 1994 He competed in the Railway Cup in both football and hurling with Leinster. He played well over 100 games with both teams. Including hurling and football, Cork is the only county Nevin has not played against competitively at senior level.

Nevin has been a driving force behind the growth and success of juvenile hurling and football in Carlow. His invaluable contributions to teams such as Naomh Bríd, Old Leighlin, and Carlow's juvenile hurling and football squads have left a lasting impact on the sport's development in the region.
