= Paul Coady =

Irish sportsperson

Personal information
- Native name: Pól Mac Oda (Irish)
- Born: 1992 (age 33–34) Borris, County Carlow, Ireland
- Occupation: Student
- Height: 5 ft 11 in (180 cm)

Sport
- Sport: Hurling
- Position: Right corner- forward
Club
| Years | Club | Apps (scores) |
| 2009-present | Mount Leinster Rangers | 255 |
Club titles
- Carlow titles: 9
- Leinster titles: 1
- All-Ireland Titles: 2
Inter-county*
| Years | County | Apps (scores) |
| 2011- | Carlow | 10 (11-152) |
Inter-county titles
- Leinster titles: 0
- All-Irelands: 1
- NHL: 0
- All Stars: 2
- *Inter County team apps and scores correct as of 19:30, 6 June 2011.

Paul Coady (born 1992 in Borris, County Carlow, Ireland) is an Irish sportsperson. He plays hurling with his club Mount Leinster Rangers which he founded in 2011 and has been a member of the Carlow senior inter-county team since 2011.

With his club Mount Leinster Rangers he won Carlow Senior Hurling Championship in 2009 and 2011. In 2011 he was part of the Mount Leinster Rangers team that made history by becoming the first team from Carlow to win a Leinster hurling title when they won the Leinster Intermediate Club Hurling Championship.
