= 2016 Carlow Senior Hurling Championship =

Annual hurling competition season

- Dates: July 2016 – October 2016
- Teams: 6
- Sponsor: JJ Kavanagh and Sons

The 2016 Carlow Senior Hurling Championship will be the 87th staging of the Carlow Senior Hurling Championship since its establishment by the Carlow County Board in 1887. The championship will begin in July 2016 and will end in October 2016.

St. Mullin's will be the defending champions.
