= Jack Kavanagh (hurler) =

Irish hurler

Personal information
- Native name: Seán Caomhánach (Irish)
- Born: 1988 (age 37–38) Bahana, County Carlow, Ireland

Sport
- Sport: Hurling
- Position: Midfield
Club
- Years: Club
- 2006-present: St Mullin's
Club titles
- Carlow titles: 7
Inter-county
Years	County	Apps (scores)
2011-2024	Carlow	1 (0-00)
Inter-county titles
- Leinster titles: 0
- All-Irelands: 0
- NHL: 0
- All Stars: 0

Jack "The Lad" Kavanagh (born 1988 in Bahana, County Carlow) is an Irish sportsperson. He plays hurling with his local club St Mullin's and has been a member of the senior Carlow county hurling team since 2011.
