= Fiach O'Toole =

Irish hurler

Personal information
- Born: 2002 (age 23–24) Leighlinbridge, County Carlow, Ireland

Sport
- Sport: Hurling
- Position: Right corner-forward
Club
- Years: Club
- Naomh Bríd Leighlinbridge GFC
Club titles
- Carlow titles: 0
Inter-county
- Years: County
- 2022-present: Carlow
Inter-county titles
- Leinster titles: 0
- All-Irelands: 0
- NHL: 0
- All Stars: 0

Fiach O'Toole (born 2002) is an Irish hurler. At club level he plays with Naomh Bríd, while he has also lined out at inter-county level with various Carlow teams.

== Career ==
O'Toole first played hurling at juvenile and underage levels with the Naomh Bríd club in Leighlinbridge. He subsequently progressed to adult level and was part of the club's intermediate team that won the Carlow IHC title in 2021.

O'Toole first appeared on the inter-county scene with Carlow during a two-year tenure with the minor team in 2018 and 2019. He later spent a number of seasons with the under-20 team and was the team's top scorer in 2022. By this stage, O'Toole had already joined the Carlow senior hurling team. He came on as a substitute when Carlow beat Offaly in extra-time to claim the Joe McDonagh Cup title in 2023.

== Honours ==
Naomh Bríd

- Carlow Intermediate Hurling Championship (2): 2021, 2025

Carlow

- Joe McDonagh Cup (1): 2023
