= Erin's Own GAA (Carlow) =

Gaelic games club in County Carlow, Ireland

Erin's Own
- Rogha Éireann
- Founded: 1934
- County: Carlow
- Colours: Black and white

Playing kits
Standard colours

Senior Club Championships
	All Ireland	Leinster champions	Carlow champions
Hurling:	0	0	3

Erin's Own is a Gaelic Athletic Association club based in Bagenalstown, County Carlow. The club, founded in 1934 but reorganised following a merger with Bagenalstown in the 1960s, was primarily concerned with the game of hurling. In 2019, the club amalgamated with St. Andrews and Muinebheag CLG to form Bagenalstown Gaels.

== History ==
Erin's Own GAA Club was founded in 1934 in the boy's local national school by Michael Gaynor, Brother Hillary, Michael Purcell, Jack Monaghan, Joe Holden and Ned Keegan. The club has won numerous club championship titles in all grades, including minor, under-21, premier junior, junior, intermediate and senior. In 2005 the club became the first from Carlow to claim a Leinster club title in any grade.

== Honours ==
- Carlow Senior Hurling Championship (3): 1964, 1967, 1970
- Leinster Junior Club Hurling Championship (1): 2005
- All-Ireland Junior Club Hurling Championship Runners-Up 2006

== Notable players ==
- Craig Doyle (hurler)
- Brian Doyle
- Jim English
- Mark Mullins
