= Ballinkillin =

Village in County Carlow, Ireland

Ballinkillen Baile an Chillín
- Village
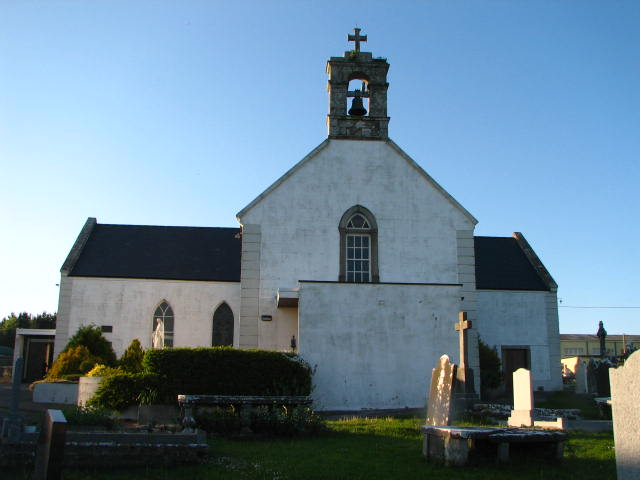
- Ballinkillen church

- Location in Ireland
- Coordinates: 52°38′53″N 6°55′43″W
- Country: Ireland
- Province: Leinster
- County: County Carlow

Ballinkillin or Ballinkillen (Irish: Baile an Chillín, meaning 'settlement of the cillín') is a small village between Borris and Bagenalstown in County Carlow, Ireland. The village itself has 20 homes and about 74 people. It includes a national school, shop, hurling pitch (Mc Donnell Park) and two housing estates.

== Points of interest ==
The church in Ballinkillin is dedicated to St. Lazerian and there is a stained glass window by Wilson of Youghal to his honour in the church. There are four other examples of stained glass windows -in honour of St. Joseph, St. Patrick, Our Lady and Christ - all donated to the church. Little is known of its history but it was built about 1793 by Fr. Michael Brophy and is one of the oldest churches in the diocese. It is likely it was a "barn church". The church at Lorum was more than likely the place of worship before this time and tradition says that there was a "mass" house near Ballinkillin Cross. In 1798 the church escaped plunder by the Crown forces as it was then thatched and looked like a farm building and they passed it by. The chapel yard started as a burial ground about 1817 and was consecrated by Bishop Doyle on Thursday, 26 September 1821. The long aisle was added to the church at this time, making it cross shaped. The Calvary was erected in 1935, the statue to Our Lady in 1955 and the cement paths around the church were completed in 1989 by voluntary labour, the materials were donated.

Lorum church is located approximately 1.5 miles from Ballinkillin. Dedicated as the Church of the Good Shepherd by Bishop Neal in 2001 . The church is surrounded by the church burial ground. To the rear of this church is a very old chapel ruin and cemetery. One headstone dates back to 1730. Also near Lorum is the remains of a High Cross. Near the village of Ballinkillin on the Lorum side there was what was known as the "religious bush". According to local tradition, a woman was shot in 1798 and is buried there. In times past procession were made from the chapel to pray at this spot, before returning to the chapel again. It is also noted that the "dead coach" was seen in the Ballinkillin area.

In May 1985, a Committee was formed to discuss the erection of a Lourdes Grotto in Ballinkillin. Under the chairmanship of Fr. Denis Murphy, C.C. the project got underway. A site known as "The Grove" opposite the church was donated by Mrs. Maeve Hughes. The grotto was built with local granite stone and voluntary labour at a cost of approximately £4,000. The statues of Our Lady of Lourdes and St. Bernadette were donated by the Presentation Sisters, Carlow, on the closure of their convent in Tullow Street. Up to 300 people attended the official opening on 1 October 1989. The ceremony of rosary and benediction was conducted by Fr. E. Dowling, P.P. and Fr. Mulhall, C.

== Sport ==
Ballinkillin Gaelic Athletic Association undertook a major development in 1992. It transformed a field, earlier purchased from the Land Commission, into a full size playing pitch complete with dressing rooms and a meeting room. It will be ready for use in Autumn 1993. The cost to date of this development is in excess of £80,000. At the moment the Hurling Club caters for ten different teams, from U-5 up to Senior. The first Football Club was formed in 1937. The founding members of the club were: Chairman: Peter Clerkin; Treasurer: Jackie McDonnell; Secretary: John O'Neill. Committee: Bill Coady, Jim Connors, John Connors, Bill Doyle and Jim Larkin. They won the Junior Championship in 1940 when they beat St. Dympna's, Carlow. In 1944 they won the Intermediate Championship. The Hurling Club was formed in 1958 and continued until 1962. Its most noteworthy achievement was reaching the Junior Hurling Final in 1962. The Club reformed in 1971 with Tommy Murphy, chairman, and John O'Neill, Secretary. In 1973 they won the Senior County Final beating Naoimh Eóin, Myshall. The club has also had success in the Bolger Cup in 1972,1973,1977 and the U-21 championships in 1978 and 1979. One of the players, Cyril Hughes, was selected and travelled with the Australia 982. The juvenile teams were formed in the mid-1980s. They won numerous county titles, most notable the U-16 A hurling in 1991. In 2001, Ballinkillin won its second senior hurling championship beating Mount Leinster Rangers in the final. Other recent success includes winning 3 minor hurling championships in a row between 2000 and 2002.

=== Community centre ===
The first meeting to consider building a community centre in Ballinkillin was held on 8 November 1974. At this meeting it was decided to go ahead and arrange the necessary fund raising. Part of the land was purchased from Corries Estate for the sum of one penny and the other section -15 feet wide - was purchased from Carlow County Council for £10. Five trustee were elected: Fr. D. Murphy, C.C., Canon Rowntree, Lar Farrell, John Ryan and Willie Kidd. Keenan Brothers erected the main ironwork structure and the block work was completed by local voluntary help. The floor in the hall was purchased from McMahons of Limerick and put in place by T. Collier at a cost of £1,651.90. An extension containing supper room, kitchen and toilets, was added in 1979. The centre was officially opened on 1 November 1979. In 1985 a club licence for the sale of alcohol was obtained and in that year the supper room was converted into a lounge bar. The Club bar opened in December 1985. A new lounge was built in 1990. The community hall is frequently used for badminton, as well as many parties and other celebratory occasions.

=== National school ===
Parish Priest of Dunleckney, Rev. M. Prendergast, built the school in Ballinkillin in 1810 with subscriptions of the Catholics, he contributed £50. The cost of building and furnishing the school was approximately £200. It is one of the oldest schools in continuous use in the country. A lease of the ground was given for ever by David La Touche to trustees for the use of the public. He also donated the rents of the two annual fairs of Slyguff for the support of the school where all the poor children of his estate and the vicinity could be educated. David La Touche was a member of the La Touche Bank in Dublin and his father was first Governor of the Bank of Ireland. It is recorded that during the Irish famine his father allowed what money might be needed to buy meal for the poor to be drawn from his bank, his sons carried on this tradition of charity. David La Touche lived in Upton House, Fenagh, and Harcourt Street, Dublin. Rev. Martin Brennan in his book Schools of Kildare and Leighlin 1775–1835, describing conditions in County Carlow at that time said: "The chief obstacle to the education of the Irish peasantry, at least in this part of the country, is their poverty. They have neither food nor raiment for the greater part, and even if they had, they have not the means of paying a small pittance to the master or of buying a book". According to Fr. Brennan's book, the master, John Brennan, Tipperary, was appointed in 1816. He was 39 years of age and is described as being of good character. There was no fixed salary for the school; the master received £10 annually for his attention both to the school and the chapel adjoining. School was held every day throughout the year except Sundays and holidays. Children were charged quarterly fees for the subjects they took - spelling cost 2s. 2d., writing 3s. 3d. and arithmetic 5s. 5d. A connection was sought to be formed with the Kildare Place Society in 1824. A sum of money was sought, and received, from the Society for the purpose of procuring the necessary fixtures for the school and for building a second floor for the purpose of a female school.

The national school system was introduced in 1831. Ballinkillin N.S. appears to have been part of the national school system in 1861. In 1960, the extension which is now the principal' s room was added. The school was a three-teacher school at that time. In 1981 a fourth teacher was appointed. The cloakroom upstairs was used as a classroom until the first pre-fab room was built in 1984. When the fifth teacher was appointed in 1985 the play shed was used as a classroom pending the building of a new school. However, this plan was abandoned due to Government cutbacks. Further renovations were carried out in 1990 which improved conditions for both teachers and pupils. The main building was re-roofed and all interior and exterior walls were painted. The work was carried out by Eamon Lalor, Garryhill, with heating contractors McCarthy/Blanchfield of Gowran and Byrne Electrical of Carlow at a cost of £56,000.

=== Archaeology ===
An example of stone art can be found at the O'Gormans; the marked stone is part of the gate to Ballinkillin Lodge. In addition, in 1984 a "cist" grave was uncovered whilst ploughing on Doran's land. It consisted of a 2 x 1 .5 ft shallow chamber with a cap stone, containing two earthenware urns with human bones and grain.

== See also ==
- List of towns and villages in Ireland
