= St Mullin's =

Village in County Carlow, Ireland

St Mullins Tigh Moling
- Village
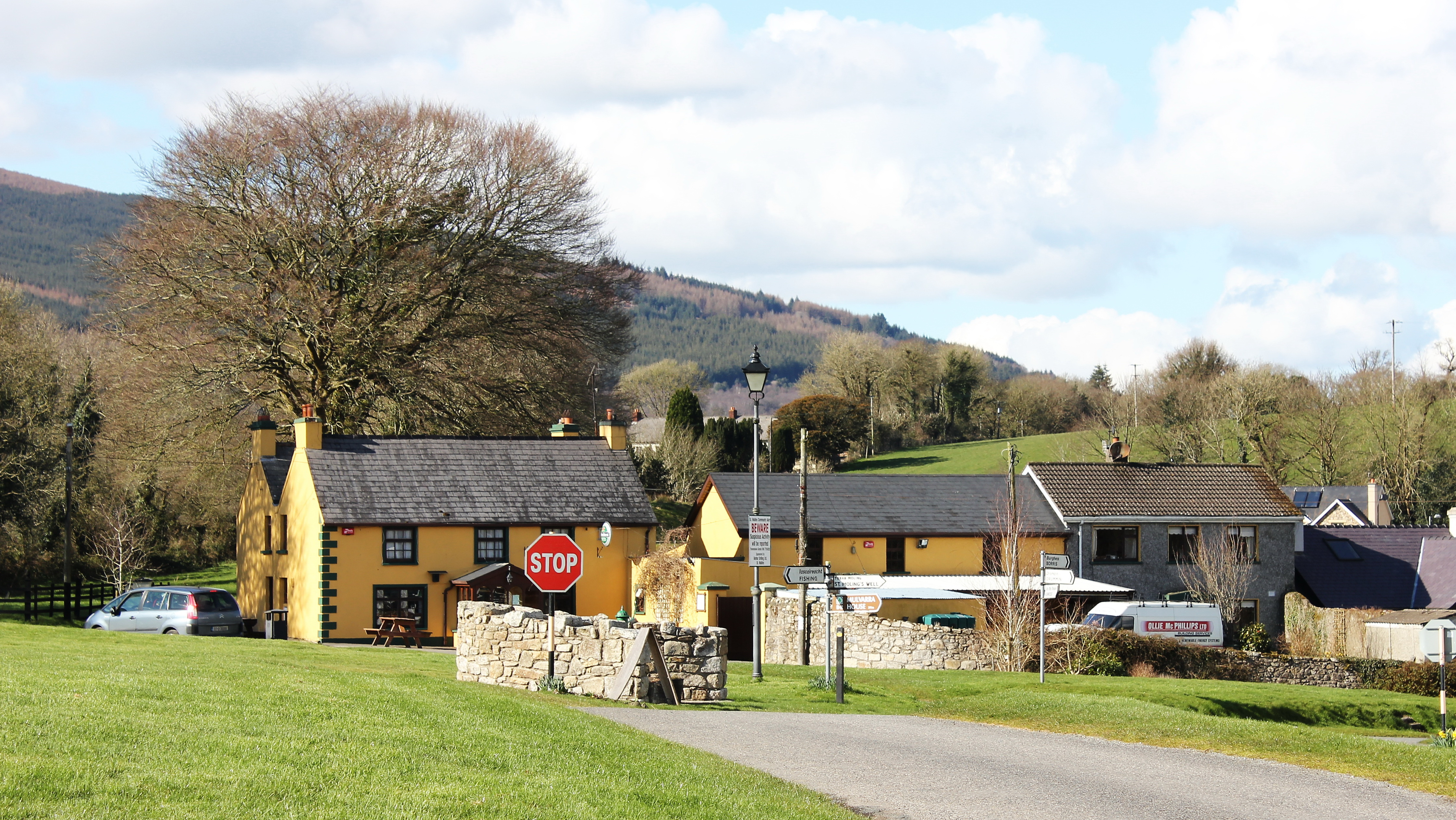

- Location in Ireland
- Coordinates: 52°29′22″N 6°55′44″W
- Country: Ireland
- Province: Leinster
- County: Carlow
- Irish Grid Reference: S7280838050

St Mullins (Irish: Tigh Moling, formerly anglicised as Timoling or Tymoling - 'homestead of Moling') is a village, civil parish and townland on the eastern bank of the River Barrow in the south of County Carlow, Ireland. A smaller part of the civil parish is in County Wexford. The village is 10 km (6 mi) north of New Ross, near the R729 road.

== History ==
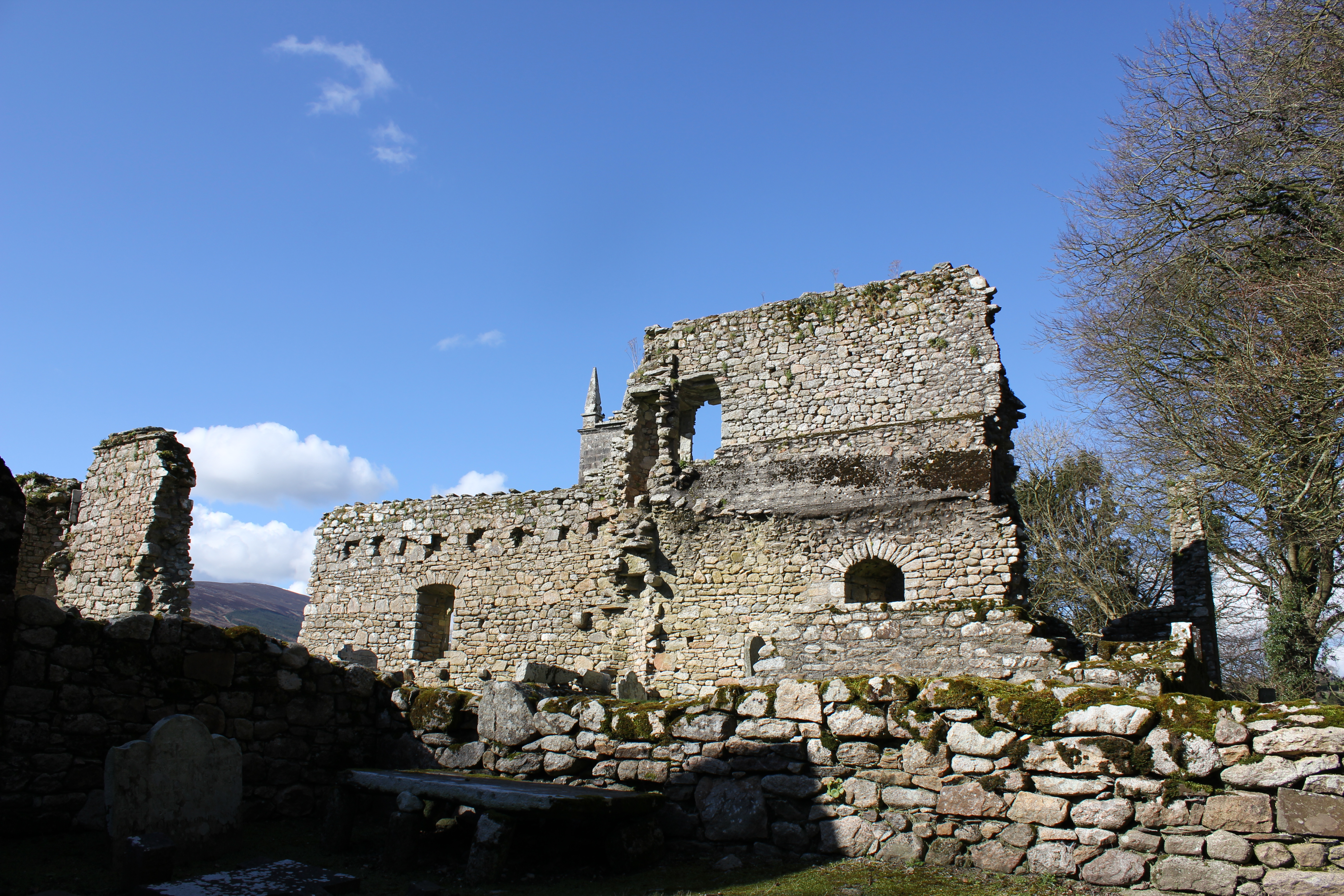
Ruins of the monastery at St Mullins

The village is named after Saint Moling (or Mo Ling, 614–697), who founded a monastery there in the early 7th century. The monastery was said to have been built with the help of "Gobán Saor", the legendary Irish builder. In the 8th-century manuscript, known as "The Book of Mulling", there is a plan of the monastery - the earliest known plan of an Irish monastery - which shows four crosses inside and eight crosses outside the circular monastic wall. It is said that St Moling dug a mile-long watercourse with his own hands to power his mill, a task that took seven years. He became Bishop of Ferns, died in 697 and is buried at St Mullins. The St Moling watercourse is still there, but the original monastery was plundered by Vikings in 951 and was again burnt in 1138. An abbey was later built on the site.

A 9th-century high cross, showing the crucifixion and a Celtic spiral pattern, stands outside the remains of the abbey. There are also the remains of a Norman motte and some domestic medieval buildings, including one that has an unusual diamond-shaped window. St Moling's Mill and St Moling's Well are close by.

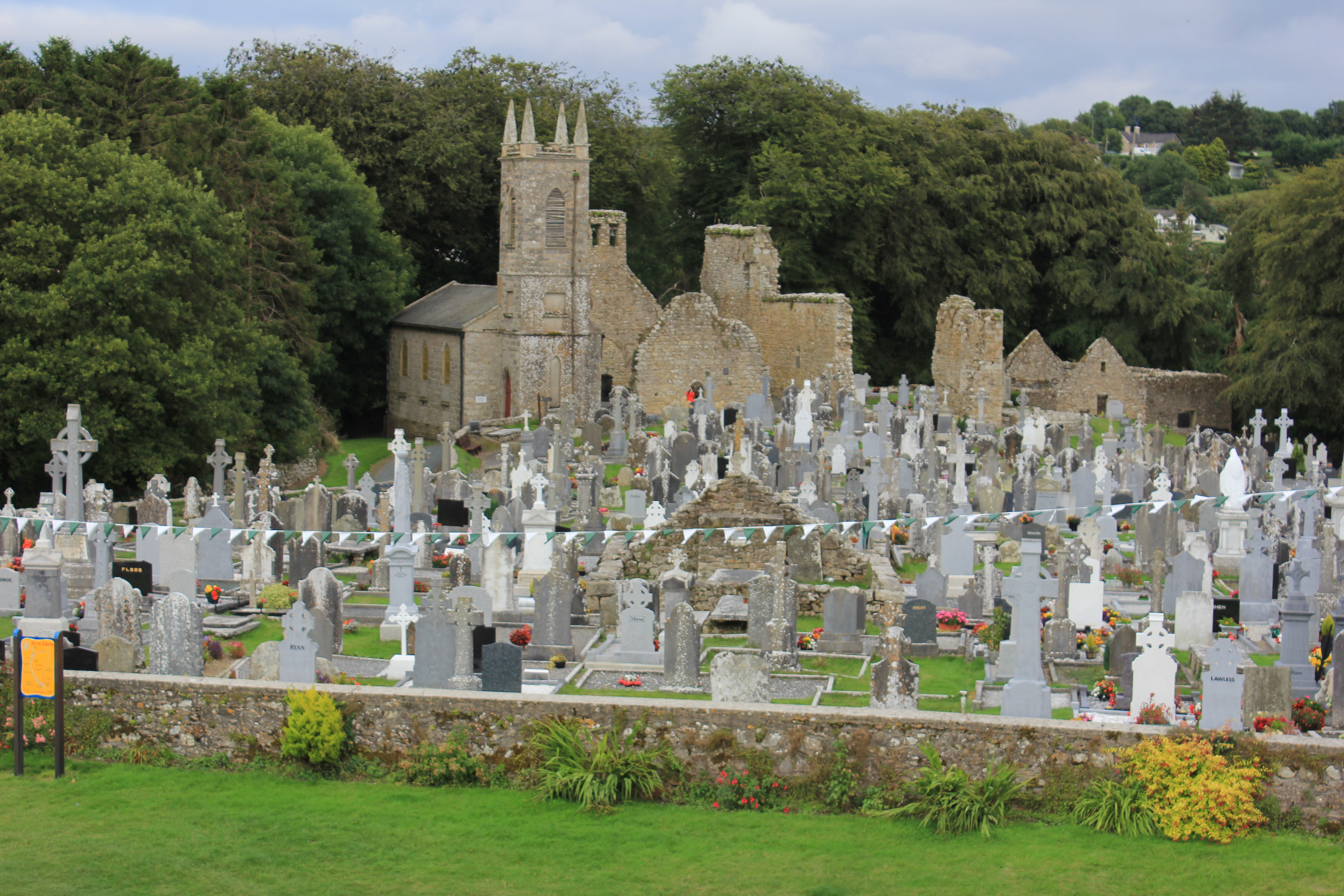
St. Mullins Graveyard and Monastic Site

In Irish folklore, St. Mullins is said to be the place where Suibhne Geilt dies, after having been welcome in the monastery by Saint Moling himself.

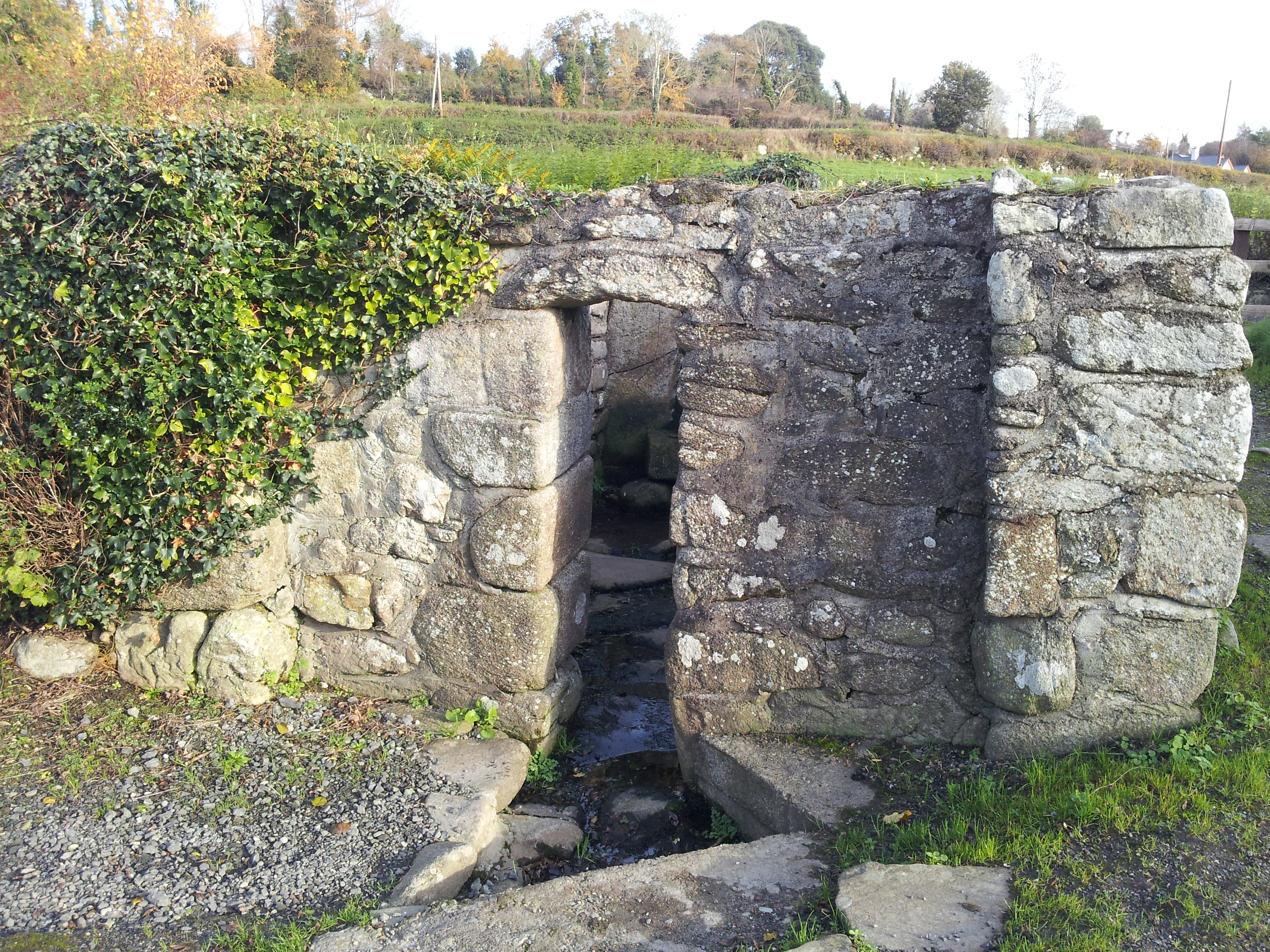
St. Moling's Well

== River Barrow ==
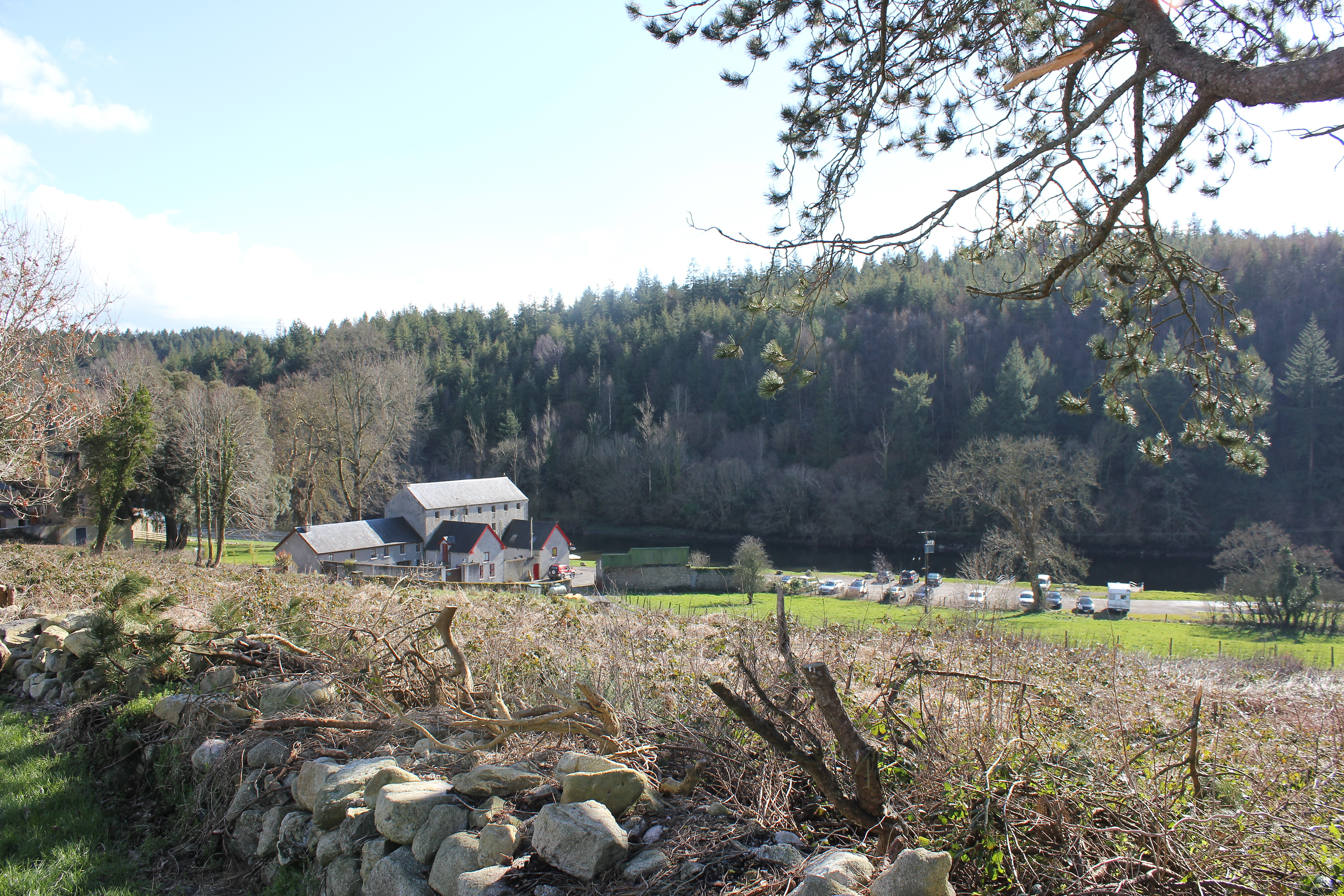
River Barrow at St Mullins

As well as being visited by anglers, St Mullins is one of the stop-off points for pleasure barges and cruisers which transit the River Barrow. The building of the canal on the Barrow began here in 1750 and the Old Grain Store was built to store goods coming up the river from the sailing ships in New Ross.

The horses and carts came down the tracks from the Blackstairs Mountains to gather their supplies and sell their goods for export. Horses were kept in the old stables to pull the barges up-river and the blacksmith was on hand to repair the barges and shoe the draught horses. By 1920, the Bolinder engine had arrived and with motorized barges the long serving horses were no longer needed.

St Mullins is also the beginning and ending point for the Barrow Way long-distance walk.

== See also ==
- List of towns and villages in Ireland
