= Craig Doyle (hurler) =

Irish hurler

Personal information
- Native name: Créag Ó Dúghaill (Irish)
- Born: 1988 (age 37–38) Bagenalstown, County Carlow, Ireland

Sport
- Sport: Hurling
- Position: Full-forward
Clubs
- Years: Club
- Erin's Own; Bagenalstown Gaels
Club titles
- Carlow titles: 0
Inter-county*
Years	County	Apps (scores)
2007-present	Carlow	10 (6-14)
Inter-county titles
- Leinster titles: 0
- All-Irelands: 0
- NHL: 0
- All Stars: 0
- *Inter County team apps and scores correct as of 22:40, 10 June 2013.

Craig Doyle (born 1988) is an Irish hurler who plays as a full-forward for the Carlow senior team.

Born in Bagenalstown, County Carlow, Doyle first played competitive hurling whilst at school in the Presentation De La Salle College. He arrived on the inter-county scene at the age of sixteen when he first linked up with the Carlow minor team, before later lining out with the under-21 side. He made his senior debut in the 2007 Christy Ring Cup. Doyle has been a regular fixture on team since that initial appearance, and has won two Christy Ring Cup medals and one National League (Division 2A) medal.

Doyle represented the Ireland national hurling team on a number of occasions, winning his sole Composite rules shinty–hurling medal in 2011. At club level he is a Leinster medallist in the junior grade with Erin's Own.

== Honours ==
=== Team ===
Erin's Own

- Leinster Junior Club Hurling Championship (1): 2005
- Carlow Intermediate Hurling Championship (1): 2005

Carlow

- Christy Ring Cup (2): 2008, 2009
- National Hurling League (Division 2A) (1): 2012
- All-Ireland Minor B Hurling Championship (2): 2004, 2005

Ireland

- Composite rules shinty–hurling (1): 2011
