= Naomh Bríd GAA =

Naomh Bríd Hurling Club
- Naomh Bríd
- Founded: 1996
- County: Carlow
- Colours: Maroon and white
- Grounds: The Superbowl
- Coordinates: 52°44′21″N 6°58′58″W

Playing kits
Standard colours

Senior Club Championships
	All Ireland	Leinster champions	Carlow champions
Hurling:	0	0	3

Naomh Bríd Hurling Club ([n̪ˠiːvˠ bʲɾʲiːdʲ], neev breed, lit. 'Saint Brigid') is a Gaelic Athletic Association club located in Leighlinbridge, County Carlow, Ireland. The club is solely concerned with the game of hurling.

== History ==
Located in the town of Leighlinbridge, Naomh Bríd was founded in February 1996 when Parnells of Leighlinbridge and St. Fintan's of Ballinabranna decided to amalgamate. Former Wexford hurler, Christy Keogh, was the team's first manager and, after a practice game against Marshalstown, their first competitive game was against losing 1995 finalists Carlow Town in the Bolger Cup. Their inaugural season yielded the ultimate in terms of club success, when the Carlow SHC title was secured after a defeat of St. Mullin's. The club claimed further Carlow SHC titles in 2004 and 2008 and has the distinction of having never lost a final.

== Honours ==
- Carlow Senior Hurling Championship (3): 1996, 2004, 2008
- Carlow Intermediate Hurling Championship (1): 2021

== Notable players ==
- Johnny Nevin: All-Ireland SBHC-winner (1992)
- Fiach O'Toole: Joe McDonagh Cup-winner (2023)
