= Bagenalstown Gaels GAA =

Irish Gaelic Athletic Association club

Bagenalstown Gaels
- CLG Muine Bheag
- Founded: 2019
- County: Carlow
- Colours: Green and black
- Grounds: McGrath Memorial Park

Playing kits
Standard colours

Bagenalstown Gaels GAA is a Gaelic Athletic Association club located in Bagenalstown, County Carlow, Ireland. The club fields teams in both hurling and Gaelic football.

== History ==
Located in the town of Bagenalstown, on the Carlow-Kilkenny border, Bagenalstown Gaels GAA Club was founded in 2019 after existing clubs St Andrew's, Erin's Own and juvenile club Muinebheag amalgamated. The club participated in the Carlow SFC and the Carlow IHC in its first competitive season. Success was immediate, with Bagenalstown Gaels winning the Carlow IHC title after a 1–11 to 0–10 defeat of Mount Leinster Rangers in 2019.

== Honours ==
- Carlow Intermediate Hurling Championship (1): 2019
- Carlow Junior Hurling Championship (1): 2025
- Carlow Under 21 B Hurling Championship (1): 2025
- Carlow Under 18 A Hurling Championship (1): 2025
- Carlow Under 16 B Football Championship (1): 2025

== Notable players ==
- Niall Bolger: Joe McDonagh Cup-winner (2023)
- Craig Doyle: Christy Ring Cup-winner (2008, 2009)
- Fiacc O'Rourke: 2025 U-14 Player of the year who captained the team to Runner's-up in both Hurling and Football
