= Ballinkillen GAA =

Gaelic games club in County Carlow, Ireland

Ballinkillen
- Baile an Chillín
- Founded: 1890
- County: Carlow
- Colours: Blue and gold

Playing kits
Standard colours

Senior Club Championships
	All Ireland	Leinster champions	Carlow champions
Hurling:	0	0	2

Ballinkillen is a Gaelic Athletic Association club based in Ballinkillin, County Carlow, Ireland. The club had fielded Gaelic football teams as far back as 1890, however, since a reorganisation in 1957 the club is now primarily concerned with hurling.

== Honours ==
- Carlow Senior Hurling Championship (2): 1973, 2001
- Carlow Intermediate Hurling Championship (1): 1990
- Carlow Junior Hurling Championship (7): 1971, 1998, 2005, 2008, 2012, 2020, 2026
- Carlow Under-21 Hurling Championship (5): 1978, 1979, 1996, 2012, 2017
- Carlow Minor Hurling Championship (4): 1999, 2000, 2001, 2009
- Carlow Minor B Hurling Championship (2): 1989, 1991

== Notable players ==
- Pat English
