= Naomh Eoin GAA =

Gaelic games club in County Carlow, Ireland

Naomh Eoin
- Naomh Eoin
- Founded: 1968
- County: Carlow
- Colours: Black and amber

Playing kits
Standard colours

Senior Club Championships
	All Ireland	Leinster champions	Carlow champions
Football:	0	0	1
Hurling:	0	0	18

Naomh Eoin is a Gaelic Athletic Association club based in Myshall, County Carlow. Named in honour of Pope John XXIII, the club was founded in 1968 and fields teams in both hurling and Gaelic football.

== History ==
In 1986 Namoh Eoin became the only club in Carlow to win the Senior Football and Senior Hurling Championship double.

== Honours ==
- Carlow Senior Hurling Championship (18): 1974, 1975, 1976, 1978, 1981, 1982, 1985, 1986, 1987, 1990, 1991, 1992, 1993, 1994, 1995, 1998, 2003, 2005
- Carlow Senior Football Championship (1): 1986
- Carlow Intermediate Hurling Championship (9): 1995, 2000, 2001, 2002, 2004, 2008, 2018, 2020, 2022
- Carlow Junior Hurling Championship (7): 1968, 1982, 1984, 1992, 2000, 2003, 2015
