= St Mullin's GAA =

Gaelic games club in County Carlow, Ireland

St Mullin's
- Naomh Moling
- Founded: 1914
- County: Carlow
- Colours: Green and White
- Grounds: Páirc Drummond, St Mullin's
- Coordinates: 52.510616°N 6.922387°W

Playing kits
Standard colours

Senior Club Championships
	All Ireland	Leinster champions	Carlow champions
Hurling:	0	0	29

St Mullin's is a Gaelic Athletic Association club located on the banks of the river Barrow beneath the Blackstairs mountains in St Mullin's, County Carlow, Ireland. The club, founded in 1914, primarily involves hurling.

== Honours ==
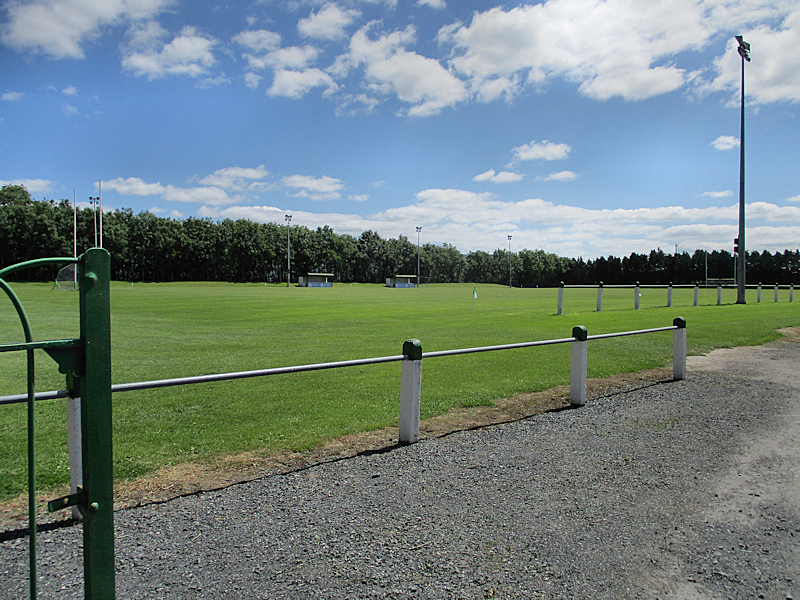
Páirc Drummond

- Leinster Senior Club Hurling Championship: Runners-up 2019
- Carlow Senior Hurling Championships: (29) 1932, 1949, 1950, 1951, 1952, 1953, 1954, 1957, 1958, 1959, 1960, 1962, 1965, 1966, 1968, 1983, 1984, 1989, 1997, 1999, 2000, 2002, 2010, 2014, 2015, 2016, 2019 2015, 2016, 2019, 2022, 2024
- Carlow Intermediate Hurling Championship (8): 1978, 1998, 1999, 2006, 2010, 2012, 2023, 2024
- Carlow Junior Hurling Championship: 2022
- Carlow Under 14 Division 1B Hurling Championship: 2024, 2025
- Carlow Junior Football Championship (1): 2023
- Carlow Junior B Football Championship (1): 2022
- Carlow Junior C Football Championship (1): 2021

== Notable players ==
- Marty Kavanagh
- Jack Kavanagh
- Paudie Kehoe

== Rivalries ==
Naomh Moling shares a hurling rivalry with fellow Blackstairs Mountains club Mount Leinster Rangers. Since Rangers first senior title in 2006 the two have dominated Carlow hurling, winning 19 of the last 20 senior championships between them. Naomh Bríd of Leighlinbridge is the only other club to win a senior championship in the last two decades.

In the last 20 years Naomh Moling have won 7 top-tier titles while Mount Leinster Rangers have won 12. The two rivals have also met in the senior final 12 times in 20 years. Both clubs have reached a Leinster final with MLR winning out in 2013 against Oulart-The Ballagh of Wexford in Nowlan Park. They then won the All-Ireland semi-final against Loughgiel Shamrocks of Antrim but lost to Joe Canning's Portumna in the final at Croke Park on St. Patrick's Day.

In the 2019 Leinster final St. Mullin's were defeated in Portlaoise by Ballyhale Shamrocks team, which featured TJ Reid. The men from Kilkenny went on to win the All-Ireland that year. The success of both clubs has led to a fiercely contested derby, often leading to red cards and ill-tempered matches.
