= Carlow Senior Hurling Championship =

Annual hurling competition

- Current season or competition: 2026 Carlow Senior Hurling Championship
- Irish: Craobh Sinsear Iomaint Cheatharlach
- Code: Hurling
- Founded: 1927; 99 years ago
- Region: Carlow (GAA)
- Trophy: Willie O'Connor Cup
- No. of teams: 7
- Title holders: Mount Leinster Rangers (13th title)
- Most titles: St Mullin's (29 titles)
- Sponsors: JJ Kavanagh and Sons
- TV partner: TG4
- Official website: Official website

The Carlow Senior Hurling Championship is an annual hurling competition contested by top-tier Carlow GAA clubs.

Mount Leinster Rangers are the current champion having defeated St Mullin's in the 2026 final.

== History ==
First records for a Championship are a draw in 1903. However, there are no records for played games. Until 1927 a championship was played inconsistently.

Since 1927, with the exception of the 'foot and mouth' year of 1941, a 'Premier' Carlow Hurling Championship has been completed. Carlow's premier hurling championship was first awarded senior status in 1960, as the county team had won promotion to Division 1 of the N.H.L. following back-to-back Division 2 title wins.

St Mullin's are the Carlow kingpins, with their 29 titles including pre-1960 titles that were won in Carlow's premier hurling competition in those days.

== Format ==
=== Group stage ===
Six clubs start in the group stage. Over the course of the group stage, each team plays once against the others in the group, resulting in each team being guaranteed five group games. Two points are awarded for a win, one for a draw and zero for a loss. The teams are ranked in the group stage table by points gained, then scoring difference and then their head-to-head record. The top four teams qualify for the knockout stage

=== Knockout stage ===
Following the completion of the group stage, the teams from the group are ranked (1-4) in terms of points accumulated and scoring difference. The two top-ranking teams receive byes to separate semi-finals.

Semi-finals: The tip four teams from the group stage contest this round. First place plays fourth place and second place plays third place The two winners from these two games advance to the final.

Final: The two semi-final winners contest the final. The winning team are declared champions.

=== Relegation ===
Due to the small number of teams, there is currently no relegation to the Carlow Intermediate Hurling Championship.

=== Qualification ===
At the end of the championship, the winning team qualify to the subsequent Leinster Senior Club Hurling Championship.

== Teams ==
=== 2027 Teams ===
Seven clubs will compete in the 2027 Carlow Senior Hurling Championship:

Team	Location	Colours	Position in 2026	In championship since	Championship titles	Last championship title
Bagenalstown Gaels	Bagenalstown	Green and black	Semi-finals	2020	0	N/A
Ballinkillen	Ballinkillen	Blue and gold	Semi-finals	1995	2	2001
Carlow Town	Carlow	White and blue	Intermediate champions	2027	12	1988
Mount Leinster Rangers	Borris	Black and red	Champions	1997	13	2026
Naomh Bríd	Leighlinbridge	Maroon and white	Group stage	2026	3	2008
Naomh Eoin	Myshall	Black and yellow	Group stage	1969	18	2005
St Mullins	St Mullins	Green and white	Runners-up	1931	29	2024

=== 2027 Hurling Grades ===
Championship	Club
Senior
Senior	Bagenalstown Gaels
Senior	Ballinkillen
Senior	Carlow Town
Senior	Mount Leinster Rangers
Senior	Naomh Bríd
Senior	Naomh Eoin
Senior	St Mullin's
Intermediate
Intermediate	Bagenalstown Gaels (2nd team)
Intermediate	Ballinkillen (2nd Team)
Intermediate	Burren Rangers
Intermediate	Kildavin/Clonegal
Intermediate	Mount Leinster Rangers (2nd team)
Intermediate	Naomh Eoin (2nd Team)
Intermediate	St Mullin's (2nd team)
Junior
Junior
Junior	Burren Rangers (2nd team)
Junior	Carlow Town (2nd team)
Junior	Mount Leinster Rangers (3rd team)
Junior	Naomh Bríd (2nd Team)
Junior	Naomh Eoin (3rd Team)
Junior	Setanta Ceatharlach
Junior	St Mullin's (3rd team)

== Trophy ==
The trophy presented to the winners is the Willie O'Connor Cup. The winners of the Carlow Championship winners qualify to represent their county in the Leinster Club Championship, the winners of which go on to the All-Ireland Senior Club Hurling Championship.

== List of finals ==
=== Legend ===
- Gold – Leinster senior club champions
- Silver – Leinster senior club runners-up

=== List of Carlow SHC finals ===
Year	Winners		Runners-up	
Year	Club	Score	Club	Score
1903	Draw made, but no record of games played			
1904-1907	No competition			
1908	Carlow-Graigue		Tullow	
1909	Competition abandoned			
1910-1913	No competition			
1914	Tullow	4-02	St Mullin's	1-00
1915	Tullow		Bagenalstown	
1916	Bagenalstown		Carlow-Graigue	
1917-1919	No competition			
1920	Carlow		Bagenalstown	
1921	Carlow Town	w/o	Bagenalstown	
1922-1926	No competition			
1927	Carlow Town	2-03	Bagenalstown	1-04
1928	Bagnelstown	4-03	Ballymurphy	0-01
1929	Bagnelstown	w/o	Ballymurphy	
1930	Bagnelstown	3-01	Paulstown	0-01
1931	Bagnelstown	2-07	St Mullin's	2-01
1932	St Mullin's	3-03	Carlow Town	0-00
1933	Cooleyhune	4-02	Bagenalstown	1-02
1934	Erin's Own	topped points table		
1935	Erin's Own		Drumphea	
1936	Erin's Own	topped points table		
1937	Carlow Town	w/o	Erin's Own	
1938	Carlow Town		Drummond	
1939	Erin's Own	topped points table		
1940	Erin's Own	topped points table		
1941	No competition			
1942	Carlow Town	topped points table		
1943	Erin's Own	topped points table		
1944	Erin's Own	topped points table		
1945	Erin's Own	topped points table		
1946	Borris	2-01	Leighlinbridge	1-00
1947	Hacketstown	2-04	St Mullin's	2-02
1948	Cournellan	3-03	St Mullin's	2-02
1949	St Mullin's	8-01	Leighlinbridge	1-00
1950	St Mullin's	2-07	Erin's Own	2-05
1951	St Mullin's	5-11	Leighlinbridge	3-03
1952	St Mullin's	2-05	Borris	2-02
1953	St Mullin's	3-01	Tinnehinch	1-00
1954	St Mullin's	5-06	Hacketstown	1-02
1955	Cournellan	5-04	Hacketstown	3-02
1956	Leighlinbridge	1-08	Tullow	0-02
1957	St Mullin's	1-08	Tullow	0-03
1958	St Mullin's	6-04	Tullow	0-05
1959	St Mullin's	4-01	Carlow Town	2-01
1960	St Mullin's	3-08	Leighlinbridge	2-01
1961	Carlow Town	5-15	St Mullin's	4-01
1962	St Mullin's	7-13	Erin's Own	4-09
1963	Carlow Town	9-09	St Mullin's	4-10
1964	Erin's Own	3-11	Cournellan	0-03
1965	St Mullin's	2-13	Carlow Town	2-04
1966	St Mullin's	4-15	Tullow	0-08
1967	Erin's Own	5-04	St Mullin's	2-08
1968	St Mullin's	3-09	Erin's Own	3-06
1969	St Fintan's	5-06	Erin's Own	2-04
1970	Erin's Own	w/o	St Mullin's	scr
1971	St Fintan's	1-12	Borris	2-03
1972	Palatine	4-09	Ballinkillen	0-14
1973	Ballinkillen	5-05	Naomh Eoin	2-09
1974	Naomh Eoin	2-16	Ballinkillen	3-05
1975	Naomh Eoin	3-12	St Fintan's	2-12
1976	Naomh Eoin	1-16	Ballinkillen	0-10
1977	Carlow Town	2-07	St Fintan's	1-07
1978	Naomh Eoin	1-08*	St Mullin's	1-06
1979	Carlow Town	0-13	Ballinkillen	0-11
1980	Carlow Town	2-10	Ballymurphy	1-08
1981	Naomh Eoin	2-13	Ballymurphy	2-08
1982	Naomh Eoin	0-15	St Mullin's	1-05
1983	St Mullin's	2-08	Ballymurphy	0-06
1984	St Mullin's	5-09	Ballymurphy	3-09
1985	Naomh Eoin	3-18	St Mullin's	3-06
1986	Naomh Eoin	5-12	St Mullin's	2-07
1987	Naomh Eoin	2-17	St Mullin's	2-10
1988	Carlow Town	3-10	Naomh Eoin	1-09
1989	St Mullin's	4-09	Naomh Eoin	2-10
1990	Naomh Eoin	2-10	St Mullin's	0-11
1991	Naomh Eoin	2-07*	St Mullin's	3-04
1992	Naomh Eoin	1-09	St Mullin's	1-08
1993	Naomh Eoin	3-09*	St Mullin's	1-15
1994	Naomh Eoin	3-06	Parnells	0-11
1995	Naomh Eoin	1-15	Carlow Town	1-10
1996	Naomh Bríd	1-16	St Mullin's	2-06
1997	St Mullin's	2-15	Naomh Eoin	1-09
1998	Naomh Eoin	1-14	Carlow Town	0-10
1999	St Mullin's	3-11*	Naomh Eoin	4-08
2000	St Mullin's	2-10	Naomh Eoin	2-02
2001	Ballinkillen	2-10	Mount Leinster Rangers	0-04
2002	St Mullin's	4-10	Naomh Eoin	4-08
2003	Naomh Eoin	2-15	Mount Leinster Rangers	0-17
2004	Naomh Bríd	2-13	Ballinkillen	1-07
2005	Naomh Eoin	0-11	Mount Leinster Rangers	0-08
2006	Mount Leinster Rangers	0-17	St Mullin's	2-08
2007	Mount Leinster Rangers	1-10	St Mullin's	1-08
2008	Naomh Bríd	3-09	Mount Leinster Rangers	2-11
2009	Mount Leinster Rangers	1-13	Erin's Own	1-11
2010	St Mullin's	1-12	Mount Leinster Rangers	0-12
2011	Mount Leinster Rangers	2-12	Naomh Eoin	3-05
2012	Mount Leinster Rangers	3-13	Erin's Own	0-06
2013	Mount Leinster Rangers	1-20	St Mullin's	0-11
2014	St Mullin's	0-09	Naomh Eoin	0-07
2015	St Mullin's	1-14	Mount Leinster Rangers	0-10
2016	St Mullin's	2-16	Mount Leinster Rangers	0-13
2017	Mount Leinster Rangers	3-17	Naomh Eoin	0-17
2018	Mount Leinster Rangers	3-10	St Mullin's	1-13
2019	St Mullin's	2-17	Mount Leinster Rangers	1-19
2020	Mount Leinster Rangers	3-21	Ballinkillen	0-12
2021	Mount Leinster Rangers	0-24	St Mullin's	0-16
2022	St Mullin's	2-22	Bagenalstown Gaels	0-11
2023	Mount Leinster Rangers	3-19	St Mullin's	1-17
2024	St Mullin's	2-25	Mount Leinster Rangers	3-16
2025	Mount Leinster Rangers	1-19	St Mullin's	0-16
2026	Mount Leinster Rangers	3-16	St Mullin's	1-18

== Roll of honour ==
=== By club ===
#	Club	Titles	Runners-up	Championships won	Championships runner-up
1	St Mullin's	29	26	1932, 1949, 1950, 1951, 1952, 1953, 1954, 1957, 1958, 1959, 1960, 1962, 1965, 1966, 1968, 1983, 1984, 1989, 1997, 1999, 2000, 2002, 2010, 2014, 2015, 2016, 2019, 2022, 2024	1914, 1931, 1947, 1948, 1961, 1963, 1967, 1970, 1978, 1982, 1985, 1986, 1987, 1990, 1991, 1992, 1993, 1996, 2006, 2007, 2013, 2018, 2021, 2023, 2025, 2026
2	Naomh Eoin	18	10	1974, 1975, 1976, 1978, 1981, 1982, 1985, 1986, 1987, 1990, 1991, 1992, 1993, 1994, 1995, 1998, 2003, 2005	1973, 1988, 1989, 1997, 1999, 2000, 2002, 2011, 2014, 2017
3	Mount Leinster Rangers	13	9	2006, 2007, 2009, 2011, 2012, 2013, 2017, 2018, 2020, 2021, 2023, 2025, 2026	2001, 2003, 2005, 2008, 2010, 2015, 2016, 2019, 2024
4	Carlow Town	12	5	1920, 1921, 1927, 1937, 1938, 1942, 1961, 1963, 1977, 1979, 1980, 1988	1932, 1959, 1965, 1995, 1998
5	Erin's Own	11	7	1934, 1935, 1936, 1939, 1940, 1943, 1944, 1945, 1964, 1967, 1970	1937, 1950, 1962, 1968, 1969, 2009, 2012
6	Bagenalstown	5	4	1916, 1928, 1929, 1930, 1931	1915, 1920, 1921, 1927, 1933
7	Naomh Bríd	3	0	1996, 2004, 2008	—
8	Ballinkillen	2	6	1973, 2001	1972, 1974, 1976, 1979, 2004, 2020
8	St Fintan's	2	2	1969, 1971	1975, 1977
8	Cournellan	2	1	1948, 1955	1964
8	Tullow	2	5	1914, 1915	1908, 1956, 1957, 1958, 1966
12	Leighlinbridge	1	4	1956	1946, 1949, 1951, 1960
12	Borris	1	2	1946	1952, 1971
12	Hacketstown	1	2	1947	1954, 1955
12	Cooleyhune	1	0	1933	—
12	Palatine	1	0	1972	—
12	Carlow-Graigue	1	1	1908	1916
18	Ballymurphy	0	6	—	1928, 1929, 1980, 1981, 1983, 1984
18	Paulstown	0	1	—	1930
18	Drumphea	0	1	—	1935
18	Drummond	0	1	—	1938
18	Tinnehinch	0	1	—	1953
18	Parnells	0	1	—	1994
18	Bagenalstown Gaels	0	1	—	2022

=== Notes ===
- The club of Naomh Bríd / St Fintan's / Parnells have a total of 5 titles
- The club of Bagenalstown / Erin's Own / Bagenalstown Gaels have a total of 15 titles

== See also ==
- Carlow Intermediate Hurling Championship (Tier 2)
- Carlow Junior Hurling Championship (Tier 3)
- Carlow Junior Hurling Shield (Tier 4)
- Leinster Senior Club Hurling Championship
- Carlow Senior Football Championship
