= 2014 All-Ireland Senior Club Hurling Championship final =

2014 All-Ireland Senior Club Hurling Final
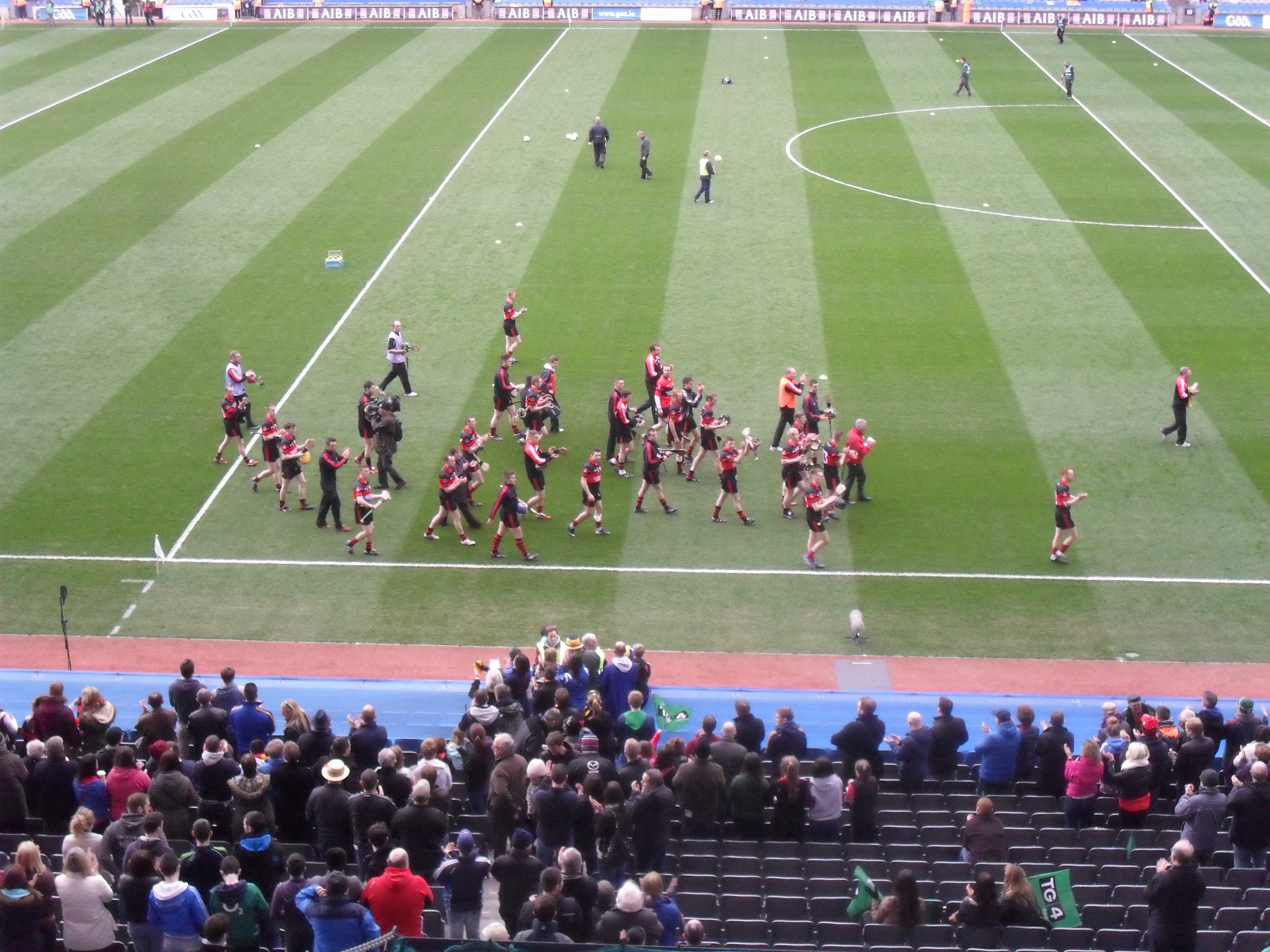
- Mount Leinster players on parade
- Event: 2013–14 All-Ireland Senior Club Hurling Championship
Portumna	Mount Leinster Rangers
0-19	0-11
- Date: 17 March 2014
- Venue: Croke Park, Dublin
- Referee: Barry Kelly (Westmeath)
- Attendance: 31,472

The 2014 All-Ireland Senior Club Hurling Championship final was a hurling match played at Croke Park on 17 March 2014 to determine the winners of the 2013–14 All-Ireland Senior Club Hurling Championship, the 44th season of the All-Ireland Senior Club Hurling Championship, a tournament organised by the Gaelic Athletic Association for the champion clubs of the four provinces of Ireland. The final was contested by Portumna of Galway and Mount Leinster Rangers of Carlow, with Portumna winning by 0-19 to 0-11.

The All-Ireland final was a unique occasion as it was the first ever championship meeting between Portumna and Mount Leinster Rangers. It remains their only clash in the All-Ireland series. Portumna were hoping to make their own piece of history by becoming only the third team to win four All-Ireland titles while first-time finalists Mount Leinster Rangers were hoping to become the first Carlow team to claim a senior All-Ireland title.

Mount Leinster Rangers got off to a great start and raced into a 0-3 to 0-1 lead. With Edward Byrne proving a thorn in Portumna's side early on, Mount Leinster Rangers deservedly held a two-point advantage after nine minutes play. Six points in a row between the 10th and 20th minutes, though, proved key to Portumna’s victory. Joe Canning – who started at midfield for Portumna – missed a simple first-minute free, but he soon found his range for the Galway champions and hit five points before the break. The real foundation of the Portumna win came in their half-forward line, with Kevin Hayes, Damien Hayes and Ollie Canning all hitting points in an impressive 10-minute spell. Despite Denis Murphy keeping Mount Leinster Rangers in touch from dead balls, Portumna led by 0-9 to 0-5 at the break.

After the restart Paul Coady came to the fore for the Carlow men, and his 31st-minute point trimmed Portumna's lead to three points. And after Murphy slotted a 34th-minute free, Portumna responded in style with points from Ollie and Joe Canning, before Ronan O'Meara hit his first to open out a six-point lead. Paul Coady continued to keep Mount Leinster Rangers in with a chance of a first All-Ireland title, but every time they pegged Portumna back, the Galway champions hit back immediately. Just five points separated the sides with four minutes remaining, but a straight red card for Edward Coady and three late frees from Joe Canning – including one awarded by Hawk-Eye – clinched the eight-point victory for Portumna.

Portumna's All-Ireland victory was their first since 2009. The win gave them their fourth All-Ireland title over all and put them in joint second place with Birr on the all-time roll of honour.

== Match ==
=== Details ===
17 March 2014
14:00

Mount Leinster Rangers	0-11 - 0-19	Portumna
D Murphy 0-5 (0-4f), P Coady 0-3, E Byrne, J Coady, HP O’Byrne 0-1 each.	Report	J Canning 0-10 (0-8f), O Canning, D Hayes 0-3 each, K Hayes 0-2, Ronan O’Meara 0-1.

Croke Park, Dublin
Attendance: 31,472
Referee: Barry Kelly (Westmeath)

Mount Leinster Rangers	Portumna
