= 2009 All-Ireland Senior Club Hurling Championship final =

2009 All-Ireland Senior Club Hurling Championship Final
- Event: 2008–09 All-Ireland Senior Club Hurling Championship
| Portumna | De La Salle |
| 2-24 | 1-8 |
- Date: 17 March 2009
- Venue: Croke Park, Dublin
- Man of the Match: [Kevin Hayes]
- Referee: James McGrath (Westmeath)
- Attendance: 32,000

The 2009 All-Ireland Senior Club Hurling Championship final was a hurling match played at Croke Park on 17 March 2009 to determine the winners of the 2007–08 All-Ireland Senior Club Hurling Championship, the 39th season of the All-Ireland Senior Club Hurling Championship, a tournament organised by the Gaelic Athletic Association for the champion clubs of the four provinces of Ireland. The final was contested by Portumna of Galway and De La Salle of Waterford, with Portumna winning by 2-24 to 1-8.

The All-Ireland final was a unique occasion as it was the first ever championship meeting between Portumna and De La Salle. It remains their only clash in the All-Ireland series. Portumna were hoping to make their own piece of history by becoming only the fourth team to retain the title.

The first half was a pedestrian affair, with De La Salle clearly nervous from the outset. Their inside forward line had a torrid afternoon against the tight marking Portumna defence, and when attacks were broken up, the Galwaymen broke up the field. De La Salle's cause wasn't helped when forwards Lee Hayes and Derek McGrath had to leave the field after picking up injuries. After 20 minutes, Portumna were 1-7 to 0-1 ahead, courtesy of a Damien Hayes goal. De La Salle's indiscipline out the field cost them and with Joe Canning's radar working to aplomb from 65s and sideline cuts, they paid a heavy price on the scoreboard. When Hayes added his second goal two minutes before the break, the game was effectively over as a contest. De La Salle were awarded a penalty just before the break, but goalkeeper Stephen Brenner's shot was tipped over the bar by Portumna custodian Ivan Canning.

The second half offered more of the same, in spite of Paudie Nevin finding the net for De La Salle after a period of ping pong in the Portumna goalmouth. Tipperary native, Micheál Ryan, Andy Smith, David Canning and Kevin Hayes also found the range for Portumna, as the game resembled a training session close to the finish. John Mullane tried hard for De La Salle, but never got a chance to run at the opposing defence, and his point near the end, received a ripple of applause from the De La Salle faithful in the crowd. Portumna's victory margin was well merited with eleven of their players getting on the scoresheet

Portumna's victory secured their third All-Ireland title in four years. They joined Sarsfield's, Athenry and Birr as the only sides to have retained the All-Ireland title.

== Match ==
=== Details ===
17 March 2009

| Portumna | 2-24 - 1-8 | De La Salle |
|---|---|---|
| D Hayes 2-2; J Canning 0-9 (0-7 frees, 0-1 sideline); N Hayes 0-5; K Hayes 0-2; A Smith 0-2; D Canning, M Ryan, E Lynch, L Smith, 0-1 each. | | P Nevin 1-0; B Phelan 0-2 (frees); T Kearney 0-2; S Brenner (pen), J Mullane, D Russell, J Quirke (free), 0-1 each. |

Croke Park, Dublin
Attendance: 32,000
Referee: J McGrath (Westmeath)

| Portumna | De La Salle |
