= 2008 All-Ireland Senior Club Hurling Championship final =

2008 All-Ireland Senior Club Hurling Championship Final
- Event: 2007–08 All-Ireland Senior Club Hurling Championship
Portumna	Birr
3-19	3-9
- Date: 17 March 2008
- Venue: Croke Park, Dublin
- Man of the Match: Andy Smith
- Referee: John Sexton (Cork)
- Attendance: 31,246

The 2008 All-Ireland Senior Club Hurling Championship final was a hurling match played at Croke Park on 17 March 2008 to determine the winners of the 2007–08 All-Ireland Senior Club Hurling Championship, the 38th season of the All-Ireland Senior Club Hurling Championship, a tournament organised by the Gaelic Athletic Association for the champion clubs of the four provinces of Ireland. The final was contested by Portumna of Galway and Birr of Offaly, with Portumna winning by 3-19 to 3-9.

The All-Ireland final was a unique occasion as it was the first ever championship meeting between Portumna and Birr. It remains their only clash in the All-Ireland series. Birr were hoping to win a fifth All-Ireland title, and equal the record set by Ballyhale Shamrocks the previous year, while Portumna were hoping to win their second title in three years.

Birr made a dream start as Simon Whelahan got on the ball to point a first-minute free. In the third minute, Brian Watkins dangled a high ball in towards the Portumna square and with goalkeeper Ivan Canning caught flat footed and defender Mike Gill losing his marker, Stephen Browne leapt unchallenged to bat home to the empty net. Joe Canning fired a free over from midfield before Kevin "Chunky" Hayes cut the gap to 1-1 to 0-2 before Birr picked off their second goal. Paul O'Meara rose highest to knock Barry Whelahan's assist past Ivan Canning to put them 2-1 to 0-2 ahead. Portumna responded when Damien Hayes and Leo Smith pointed before Andy Smith showed great poise to tuck a grounded ball past goalkeeper Brian Mullins with his left boot. Portumna continued to dominate up to half time and would have been further in front at the break but for Joe Canning having a penalty saved. A pointed 105-metre free, allied to efforts from Damien Hayes, Kevin Hayes and Andy Smith led to Portumna taking a 1-11 to 2-4 lead at the break.

Andy Smith's 33rd-minute goal widened the gap before a Joe Canning free put nine between the sides. Birr kept plugging away with Brian Whelahan pointing before Simon Whelahan was successful with three frees after 39, 44 and 48 minutes. Joe Canning kept the leaders ticking over with a series of placed balls, before Damien Hayes dashed in from the right and blasted a shot into the top left corner of the net for a third Portumna goal. Birr had a late spurt with Simon Whelahan sneaking a 20-metre free into the Portumna net. Whelahan's brother Brian, the Birr captain, ended the game standing behind the Davin Stand goal after he received a last-minute red card for striking an opponent.

Portumna's All-Ireland victory was their second ever and their first since 2006.

== Match ==
=== Details ===
17 March 2008

Portumna	3-19 - 3-9	Birr
J Canning 0-10 (6f, 1'65', 1 sideline), A Smith 2-2, D Hayes 1-3, K Hayes 0-3, L Smith 0-1.		S Whelahan 1-7 (1-6f), S Brown, P O'Meara 1-0 each, Brian Whelahan, R Hanniffy 0-1 each.

Croke Park, Dublin
Attendance: 31,246
Referee: J Sexton (Cork)

Portumna	Birr
