= Joe Canning =

Irish hurler (born 1988)

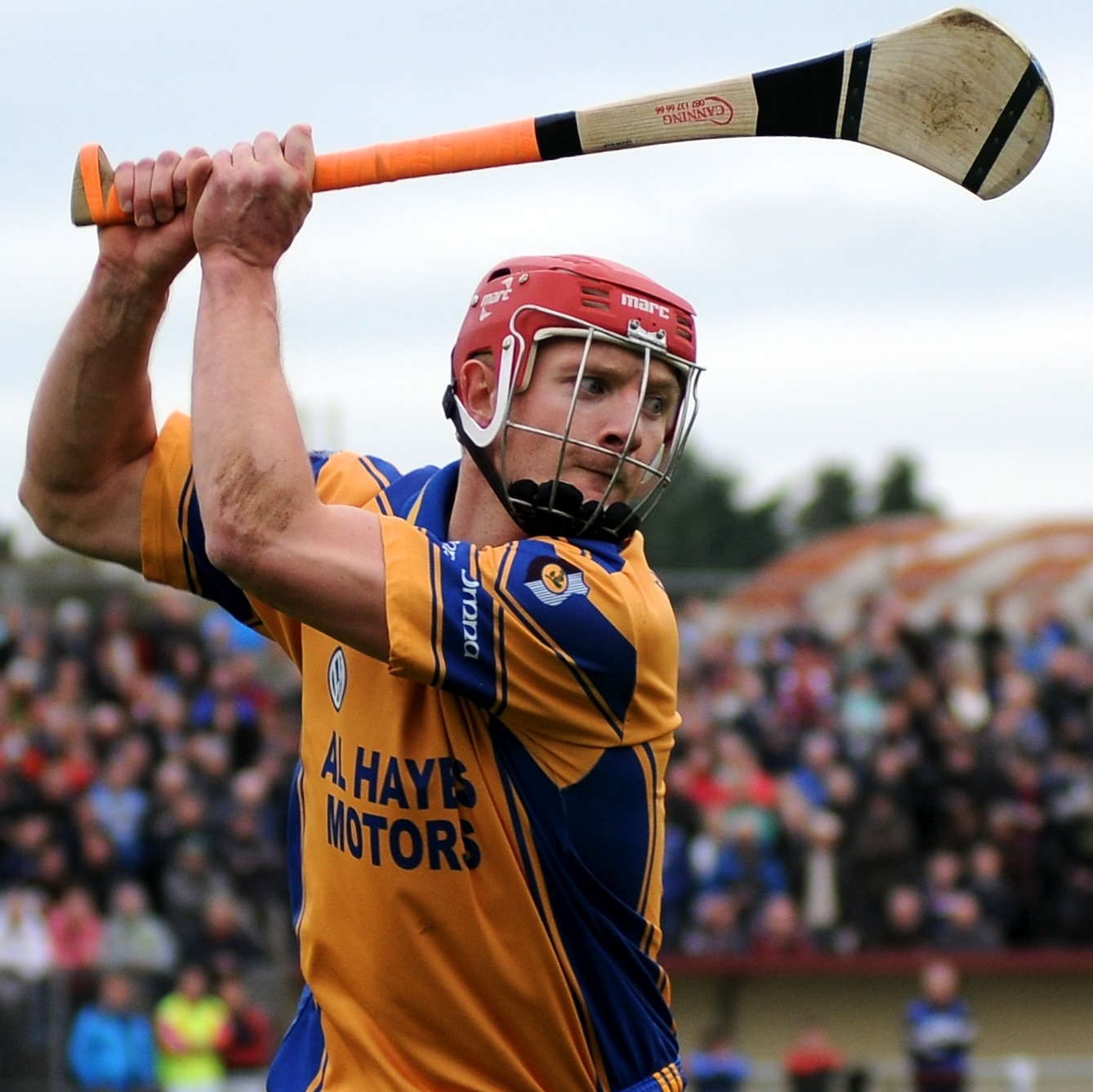

Personal information
- Born: 11 October 1988 (age 38) Ballinasloe, County Galway, Ireland
- Occupations: Publican and restaurateur
- Height: 1.88 m (6 ft 2 in)

Sport
- Sport: Hurling
- Position: Centre forward
Club
Years	Club	Apps (scores)
2004–present	Portumna	113 (62-907)
Club titles
- Galway titles: 5
- Leinster titles: 2
- All-Ireland Titles: 4
College
- Years: College
- 2007–2013: Limerick Institute of Technology
College titles
- Fitzgibbon titles: 1
Inter-county*
Years	County	Apps (scores)
2008–2021	Galway	62 (27-486)
Inter-county titles
- Leinster titles: 3
- All-Irelands: 1
- NHL: 3
- All Stars: 5
- *Inter County team apps and scores correct as of 14:00, 28 July 2021.

Joseph Canning (born 11 October 1988) is an Irish hurler who plays for club side Portumna and previously at inter-county level with the Galway senior hurling team. Regarded as one of the greatest hurlers in the history of the sport, Canning enjoyed a 14-season career with the Galway senior hurling team, won five All-Stars and was named GAA-GPA Hurler of the Year in 2017. He won seven major trophies in his inter-county career, including one All-Ireland Championship, three Leinster Championships and three National Hurling Leagues. A prolific scorer from play and placed balls, Canning holds the record for most sideline cuts scored (28) and was the championship's all-time top scorer with 27 goals and 486 points. His 62 championship appearances is a Galway record.

Born and raised in Portumna, County Galway, Canning first played competitive hurling at juvenile and underage levels with the Portumna club. He made his senior debut for the club aged 15 in May 2004 and immediately established himself as an integral player. In his second season, Canning helped the club to a second-ever County Championship title before ending the campaign with the 2006 All-Ireland Club Championship. It was the first of four county championship titles in five seasons, while he also added All-Ireland titles to his collection in 2008 and 2009. Canning won a fifth county championship in 2013 before ending the season with a fourth All-Ireland club winners' medal.

Canning lined out for Galway in three different grades of hurling over a 17-year period. At underage levels, he won two All-Ireland Minor Championships from three consecutive final appearances and an All-Ireland Under-21 Championship. After making his senior debut in April 2008, Canning won his first All-Star award as well as being named Young Hurler of the Year. Canning ended the 2012 season with his third All-Star and his first Hurler of the Year nomination, having been part of Galway's inaugural Leinster Championship-winning campaign. 2017 saw him named Hurler of the Year, having played a key role in Galway's clean sweep of National League and Leinster Championship successes, as well as a first All-Ireland Championship in 29 years. Canning earned a fifth All-Star award and a third Hurler of the Year nomination in 2018 after winning a third Leinster Championship title and appearing in his fourth All-Ireland final.

== Biography ==
Joe Canning was born in Portumna in 1988. His uncle Frankie Canning, played minor hurling with Galway for three years in their ill-fated Munster Championship campaign in the 1960s and was a non-playing substitute when the Galway senior team were defeated by Offaly in the All-Ireland final of 1981. Canning is the brother of Séamus, Frank, Davy, Ollie, Ivan and Deirdre. All but one of those siblings would go on to win an All-Ireland medal at either club or inter-county level in either hurling or camogie. Ollie played for and captained the Galway senior hurlers winning four All Stars, while Deirdre played for the county camogie team. Joe's family instilled a love of hurling in him, and he was a talented underage hurler and rugby player. Canning was educated locally, before going on to study Business and Marketing at the Limerick Institute of Technology.

== Playing career ==
=== Limerick Institute of Technology ===
In 2007 Canning was in his first year as a member of the Limerick Institute of Technology (LIT) hurling team. He won a Fitzgibbon Cup medal that year as the National University of Ireland, Galway were defeated by 2–15 to 0–13 in the final.

LIT hoped to claim historic back-to-back titles in 2008 and qualified for the final against the Waterford Institute of Technology. In spite of Canning scoring a remarkable 1–16 of LIT's total in a tightly contested final, he still ended up on the losing side.

In spite of enjoying just one Fitzgibbon Cup success during his career, Canning was named at full-forward on the Fitzgibbon Cup centenary team in 2012.

=== Portumna ===
Canning joined the Portumna club at a young age and played in all grades at juvenile and underage levels. He made his first appearance for the club's senior team as a 15-year-old during the 2004 Galway Championship. On 31 October, he was at left corner-forward for Portumna's 0–15 to 0–13 defeat by Athenry in the final.

On 13 November 2005, Canning scored 1-11 for Portumna in their 3–21 to 3–14 defeat of Loughrea to win their second ever Galway Senior Championship title. He was again the top scorer for Portumna on 20 November in their 2–22 to 0–06 defeat of Four Roads to win the Connacht Championship. Canning won his first All-Ireland Championship medal on 17 March 2006 following Portumna's 2–08 to 1–06 defeat of Newtownshandrum in the All-Ireland final. After scoring 1-06 of the Portumna total, Canning was named man of the match.

On 22 October 2006, Canning scored seven points from left corner-forward when Portumna suffered a 1–13 to 0–15 defeat by Loughrea in the 2006 Galway Championship final.

Canning lined out at left corner-forward in a third successive Galway Championship final on 21 October 2007. He scored 3-04, including three frees, in the 6–12 to 0–11 defeat of Kinvara. On 18 November he scored five points when Portumna defeated James Stephens by 6–23 to 0–07 to win the last Connacht Championship title. On 17 March 2008, hit a total of ten points, eight coming from placed balls, including a free from well over 100 metres out and a sideline cut in the All-Ireland final. His performance was described as a "phenomenon" in the 3–19 to 3–09 defeat of Birr. Canning ended the championship as top scorer with 1-24.

On 2 November 2008, Canning won a third Galway Senior Championship when Portumna retained the title after a 1–18 to 2–07 defeat of Gort in the final. On 17 March 2009, he scored nine points for Portumna when they retained their All-Ireland Championship title after a 2–24 to 1–08 defeat of first-time finalists De La Salle.

Canning won a third successive Galway Senior Championship medal on 15 November 2009 after a 5–19 to 1–13 defeat of Loughrea in the final. On 17 March 2010, he scored ten points when Portumna were defeated by Ballyhale Shamrocks in the All-Ireland final.

On 28 October 2013, Canning scored 1-05 from left wing-forward when he won his fifth Galway Senior Championship medal after a 3–12 to 0–14 defeat of Loughrea in the final. In the All-Ireland final on 17 March 2014, Canning claimed a fourth winners' medal after scoring ten points in the 0–19 to 0–11 defeat of Mount Leinster Rangers.

On 14 December 2014, Canning scored six points for Portumna in their 1–10 to 2–13 defeat by Gort in the Galway Senior Championship final.

=== Galway ===
==== Minor and under-21 ====
Canning first played for Galway as a member of the minor team. He made his first appearances as a 15-year old on 15 August 2004 and scored 1–01 in a 2–15 to 1–13 defeat of Cork in the All-Ireland semi-final. He was limited to just one point from play in the subsequent All-Ireland final draw with Kilkenny on 12 September. In the replay a week later Canning scored four points, including two sidelines, in the 0–16 to 1–12 victory.

On 11 September 2005, Canning lined out at left corner-forward in his second successive All-Ireland final. He was Galway's top scorer with 1–03 in their 3–12 to 0–17 defeat of Limerick.

Canning was appointed captain for the 2006 All-Ireland Championship as the Galway team attempted to win a third successive championship. He also had the opportunity of becoming the first player since Jimmy Doyle in 1957 to win three successive All-Ireland medals. On 3 September 2006, he top scored for Galway with five points in their 2–18 to 2–07 defeat by Tipperary in the All-Ireland final. Canning later stated that the team could have performed better on the day: "To me, the three-in-a-row thing wasn't in my mind. Our performance was what frustrated me that day. We didn't do ourselves justice. Tipperary blew us off the pitch basically".

On 19 August 2006, Canning was still a member of the minor team when he made his first appearance for the Galway under-21 team. He scored 2–04 after coming on as a substitute in Galway's 1–24 to 2–12 defeat by Kilkenny in the All-Ireland semi-final.

Canning lined out at full-forward on the Galway under-21 team that faced Dublin in the All-Ireland final on 8 September 2007. He scored three points in the 5–11 to 0–12 victory and won his only All-Ireland Championship medal in the grade.

Canning's last two seasons with the under-21 team saw Galway face defeat at the All-Ireland semi-final stage on both occasions. He captained the team in 2009 in what was his last game in the under-21 grade.

==== Senior ====
In December 2005, Galway senior hurling team manager Conor Hayes admitted that he strongly considered adding Canning to his panel for the 2006 season. He stated: "I'd be conscious of Joe Canning's age but it's something we will be looking at strongly. He'd be very hard to ignore, even at 17 or 18". When Hayes later announced his panel for the 2006 National League, Canning was not included. There was further speculation that he was about to be added to the Galway senior panel during the 2006 All-Ireland Championship, however, he was again omitted. The appointment of Ger Loughnane as Galway manager in September 2006 fuelled speculation that Canning would again be approached to join the Galway senior panel. Canning once again declined, opting instead to concentrate on his role with the Galway under-21 team.

On 13 April 2008, Canning made his debut for the Galway senior team in a 2–22 to 0–24 defeat of Cork in the National League semi-final at the Gaelic Grounds. He scored four points, including a trademark sideline cut. On 20 April, he scored 1-06 from left corner-forward in Galway's 3–18 to 3–16 defeat by Tipperary in the final. Canning made his first appearance in the All-Ireland Championship on 28 June 2008 and scored 2–06 in a 6–21 to 1–10 defeat of Antrim. He ended the season by winning his first All-Star, as well as being named Young Hurler of the Year.

Canning ended the 2009 All-Ireland Championship as top scorer with 3-46. He later won a second successive All-Star after he was named in the full-forward position.

On 2 May 2010, Canning lined out at full-forward and scored 1–05 in Galway's 2–22 to 1–17 defeat by Cork in the National League final. On 4 July, he lined out in his first Leinster Championship final and scored two points in Galway's 1–19 to 1–12 defeat by Kilkenny. Canning was Galway's top scorer throughout the championship and ended the season by being nominated for a third successive All-Star.

Canning endured disappointing National League and Championship campaigns with Galway throughout 2011. In spite of this, he was nominated for a fourth successive All-Star at the end of the season.

On 8 July 2012, Canning top scored with 1-10 when Galway defeated Kilkenny by 2–21 to 2–12 to win the Leinster Championship final for the first time in their history. He was also named man of the match. On 9 September, Canning scored a last-minute free to earn a 2–13 to 0–19 draw with Kilkenny in the All-Ireland final. The replay on 30 September saw Canning top score for Galway with nine points, however, Kilkenny retained the title after a 3–22 to 3–11 victory. He ended the season by being nominated for Hurler of the Year as well as winning a third All-Star.

On 7 July 2013, Canning scored 1-07 for Galway when the suffered a 2–25 to 2–13 defeat by Dublin in the Leinster Championship final. A disappointing season culminated with Canning failing to be nominated for an All-Star for the first time in his career.

In December 2013, Canning was named as the Galway senior hurling captain for the 2014 season.

Canning lined out at full-forward in the Leinster Championship final against Kilkenny on 5 July 2015. In the 33rd minute he scored one of the "classiest" goals ever seen in Croke Park when he caught the sliotar with his back to goal, turned immediately and fired a shot past Eoin Murphy. Galway eventually lost the game by 1–23 to 2–17. On 6 September, Canning lined out in the All-Ireland final, scoring 1-08, in Galway's 1–22 to 1–18 defeat by Kilkenny. Canning ended the championship as top scorer with 5-55. He ended the season by receiving his sixth All-Star nomination.

On 3 July 2016, Canning scored six points in Galway's 1–26 to 0–22 defeat by Kilkenny in the Leinster Championship final. Following Galway's exit from the championship in August, he underwent surgery on his hamstring.

On 19 February 2017, Canning made his return from injury when he came on as a second-half substitute and scored a penalty in a 3–13 to 1–21 defeat by Wexford in the National League. On 22 April, he scored nine points when Galway won the National League title after a 3–21 to 0–14 victory over Tipperary in the final. The subsequent championship saw Galway qualify for a Leinster Championship final meeting with Wexford. Canning ended the game as top scorer with ten points after the 0–29 to 1–17 victory. On 6 August Galway defeated All-Ireland Champions Tipperary in the All-Ireland semi-final. Canning scored 0–11, including 0–5 in the final 15 minutes. Canning scored the final point to win the game for Galway with what was described as a 'Miracle shot' by TV commentary, shooting under pressure while standing on the sideline.

On 3 September 2017, Canning was at centre-forward when Galway faced Waterford in the All-Ireland final. He was the top scorer for Galway in the 0–26 to 2–17 victory and a first All-Ireland Championship for Galway in 29 years. Canning ended the season by being named Hurler of the Year as well as picking up his fourth All-Star.

On 19 November 2017, Galway manager Micheál Donoghue confirmed that Canning was recovering from keyhole surgery. He resumed some light training in January 2018 before returning to the Galway panel for collective training, however, he missed Galway's first four games in the National League and struggled with injuries throughout the season. On 1 July, Canning top scored for Galway with six points in their 0-18 apiece draw with Kilkenny in the Leinster Championship final. The replay a week later saw him end the game as the top scorer with ten points in Galway's 1–28 to 3–15 victory. On 19 August, Canning was at centre-forward when Galway faced Limerick in the All-Ireland final. He scored 1-10 during the game, however, Limerick won their first title in 45 years after a 3–16 to 2–18 victory. A last-minute free by Canning to level the game dropped short. He later stated: "I should have got it. I wouldn't have went back if I didn't think I'd get it. I probably tried to hit it too hard and I kinda mis-hit it a little bit." Canning ended the season by being named in the centre-forward position on the All-Star team, while he was also nominated for Hurler of the Year.

In March 2019, Canning suffered a groin injury in the 2019 National Hurling League semi-final defeat against Waterford which required surgery ruling him out of action for 14 to 16 weeks. He returned to action on 15 June 2019 in the last round of matches in the 2019 Leinster Senior Hurling Championship, coming on as a substitute in the 3–19 to 0–24 defeat to Dublin which eliminated Galway from the Leinster and All-Ireland Championship's for 2019.

On 29 November 2020 in the All-Ireland semi-final against Limerick, Canning scored four points from sideline balls which was a new championship record. Limerick went on to win the game by 0–27 to 0-24.

On 24 July 2021, in the All-Ireland qualifiers against Waterford, Canning scored nine points during the game to overtake Henry Shefflin and become the top scorer in the history of the hurling championship on a total of 27 goals and 485 points.

==== Retirement ====
On 28 July 2021, Canning announced his retirement from inter-county hurling.

== Media career ==
Since 2022, Canning has appeared as a pundit on RTÉ Sport's coverage of championship hurling. In January 2023, he was featured in the first episode of series 21 of Laochra Gael.

== Personal life ==
In September 2010, Canning was appointed an Ambassador for UNICEF Ireland, he is also a brand ambassador for Audi.

He married Megan Hoare in November 2022 in County Limerick and they have a daughter named Josie born in 2024. He runs a restaurant in Galway and a bar in Athlone.

== Career statistics ==
=== Club ===
As of match played 21 August 2020.

Team	Year	Galway		Connacht		All-Ireland		Total	
Team	Year	Apps	Score	Apps	Score	Apps	Score	Apps	Score
Portumna	2004–05	7	0-12	—		—		7	0-12
Portumna	2005–06	7	10-52	1	1-09	2	2-13	10	13-74
Portumna	2006–07	5	3-46	—		—		5	3-46
Portumna	2007–08	7	6-53	1	0-05	2	1-19	10	7-77
Portumna	2008–09	8	4-63	—		2	2-14	10	6-77
Portumna	2009–10	8	8-67	—		2	1-20	10	9-87
Portumna	2010–11	7	5-56	—		—		7	5-56
Portumna	2011–12	4	2-29	—		—		4	2-29
Portumna	2012–13	5	2-37	—		—		5	2-37
Portumna	2013–14	8	3-77	—		2	0-19	10	3-96
Portumna	2014–15	7	4-55	—		—		7	4-55
Portumna	2015–16	5	3-55	—		—		5	3-55
Portumna	2016–17	4	0-33	—		—		4	0-33
Portumna	2017–18	6	2-58	—		—		6	2-58
Portumna	2018–19	6	2-61	—		—		6	2-61
Portumna	2019–20	4	0-23	—		—		4	0-23
Portumna	2020–21	3	1-31	—		—		3	1-31
Career total		101	55-808	2	1-14	10	6-85	113	62-907

=== Inter-county ===
Team	Year	National League			Leinster		All-Ireland		Total	
Team	Year	Division	Apps	Score	Apps	Score	Apps	Score	Apps	Score
Galway	2008	Division 1A	2	1-10	0	0-00	3	4-27	5	5-37
Galway	2009	Division 1	2	0-15	2	3-19	3	0-27	7	3-61
Galway	2010	Division 1	2	1-07	4	3-13	1	1-05	7	5-25
Galway	2011	Division 1	1	1-06	2	1-06	3	2-25	6	4-37
Galway	2012	Division 1A	2	2-19	2	1-21	3	1-29	7	4-69
Galway	2013	Division 1A	6	2-48	2	1-18	1	0-07	9	3-73
Galway	2014	Division 1A	1	0-01	3	2-06	1	0-05	5	2-12
Galway	2015	Division 1A	4	1-23	4	4-32	3	1-23	11	6-78
Galway	2016	Division 1A	6	1-52	3	0-22	2	1-13	11	2-87
Galway	2017	Division 1B	7	3-47	3	0-26	2	0-20	12	3-93
Galway	2018	Division 1B	2	0-11	5	1-48	3	1-30	10	2-89
Galway	2019	Division 1B	6	0-57	1	0-02	—		7	0-59
Galway	2020	Division 1B	2	0-19	2	0-23	2	0-26	6	0-68
Galway	2021	Division 1A	3	1-18	1	0-06	1	0-09	5	1-32
Career total			46	13-333	34	16-242	28	11-246	108	40-821

== Honours ==
=== Team ===
Limerick Institute of Technology

- Fitzgibbon Cup (1): 2007

Portumna

- All-Ireland Senior Club Hurling Championship (4): 2006, 2008, 2009, 2014
- Connacht Senior Club Hurling Championship (2): 2005, 2007
- Galway Senior Hurling Championship (5): 2005, 2007, 2008, 2009, 2013

Galway

- All-Ireland Senior Hurling Championship (1): 2017
- Leinster Senior Hurling Championship (3): 2012, 2017, 2018
- National Hurling League (3): 2010, 2017, 2021
- All-Ireland Under-21 Hurling Championship (1): 2007
- All-Ireland Minor Hurling Championship (2): 2004, 2005

=== Individual ===
Awards

- All Stars Hurler of the Year (1): 2017
- All Stars Young Hurler of the Year (1): 2008
- All-Star Awards (5): 2008, 2009, 2012, 2017, 2018
- Fitzgibbon Cup Team of the Century: 1912–2012
- Best Galway team of the last fifty years: 1962–2012
- In May 2020, a public poll conducted by RTÉ.ie named Canning in the half-forward line alongside Henry Shefflin and D. J. Carey in a team of hurlers who had won All Stars during the era of The Sunday Game.
- Also in May 2020, the Irish Independent named Canning at number eight in its "Top 20 hurlers in Ireland over the past 50 years".

== Sponsorship ==
=== Red Bull ===
Joe is currently sponsored by Red Bull. His most recent activity with the energy drink has included becoming the face of a Red Bull branded Hurling game called Red Bull Strike.

Sporting positions
Preceded by Andrew Keary	Galway minor hurling team captain 2006	Succeeded by Mark McMahon
Preceded by	Galway Under-21 Hurling Captain; 2009	Succeeded by David Burke
Preceded by Fergal Moore	Galway Senior Hurling Captain; 2014	Succeeded by David Collins
Awards
Preceded by Séamus Hickey	GAA All-Star Young Hurler of the Year; 2008	Succeeded by Noel McGrath
Preceded by Austin Gleeson	GAA-GPA All-Star Hurler of the Year; 2017	Succeeded by Cian Lynch
Records
Preceded by Henry Shefflin	All-Ireland Senior Hurling Championship top scorer 24 July 2021 – present	Incumbent
