= Kevin McDonald (hurler) =

Irish hurler

Personal information
- Native name: Caoimhín Mac Dónaill (Irish)
- Nickname: Mac
- Born: 1997 (age 28–29) Borris, County Carlow, Ireland

Sport
- Sport: Hurling
- Position: Right wing-forward
Club
- Years: Club
- Mount Leinster Rangers
Club titles
- Carlow titles: 5
College
- Years: College
- University of Limerick
College titles
- Fitzgibbon titles: 1
Inter-county*
| Years | County | Apps (scores) |
| 2016-present | Carlow | 8 (0-02) |
Inter-county titles
- Leinster titles: 0
- All-Irelands: 0
- NHL: 0
- All Stars: 0
- *Inter County team apps and scores correct as of 15:52, 12 December 2021.

Kevin McDonald (born 1997) is an Irish hurler who plays for Carlow Senior Championship club Mount Leinster Rangers and at inter-county level with the Carlow senior hurling team. He has lined out in both defence and as a forward.

== Career ==
McDonald first came to hurling prominence at juvenile and underage levels with the Mount Leinster Rangers club in Borris. He eventually progressed onto the club's senior team and has won three Carlow SHC titles. McDonald first appeared on the inter-county scene during a two-year stint with the Carlow minor hurling team before later lining out with the under-21 team. He made his senior debut in 2016 and was part of the Carlow team that won the Christy Ring Cup and Joe McDonagh Cup titles. McDonald has also shared in a National League Division 2A success.

== Career statistics ==
As of match played 6 March 2022.

| Team | Year | National League | | | Ring Cup | | McDonagh Cup | | Leinster | | All-Ireland | | Total | |
| Team | Year | Division | Apps | Score | Apps | Score | Apps | Score | Apps | Score | Apps | Score | Apps | Score |
|---|---|---|---|---|---|---|---|---|---|---|---|---|---|---|
| Carlow | 2016 | Division 2A | 6 | 0-08 | — | | — | | 3 | 0-02 | — | | 9 | 0-10 |
| Carlow | 2017 | Division 2A | 5 | 0-05 | 4 | 2-02 | — | | — | | — | | 9 | 2-07 |
| Carlow | 2018 | Division 2A | 6 | 0-01 | — | | 6 | 0-04 | — | | 1 | 0-00 | 13 | 0-05 |
| Carlow | 2019 | Division 1B | 2 | 0-00 | — | | — | | 4 | 0-00 | — | | 6 | 0-00 |
| Carlow | 2020 | Division 1B | 6 | 0-00 | — | | 4 | 0-08 | — | | — | | 10 | 0-08 |
| Carlow | 2021 | Division 2A | 5 | 3-03 | — | | 2 | 2-02 | — | | — | | 7 | 5-05 |
| Carlow | 2022 | Division 2A | 4 | 1-24 | — | | 0 | 0-00 | — | | — | | 4 | 1-24 |
| Career total | | | 34 | 4-41 | 4 | 2-02 | 12 | 2-14 | 7 | 0-02 | 1 | 0-00 | 58 | 8-59 |

== Honours ==
Mount Leinster Rangers

- Carlow Senior Hurling Championship: 2017, 2018, 2020, 2021, 2023

Carlow

- Joe McDonagh Cup: 2018, 2023
- Christy Ring Cup: 2017
- National Hurling League Division 2A: 2018
