= 2011–12 All-Ireland Intermediate Club Hurling Championship =

All Ireland Champions
- Winners: Mount Leinster Rangers (1st win)
- Captain: Karl Lawler
- Manager: Tom Mullally

All Ireland Runners-up
- Runners-up: Middletown Na Fianna
- Captain: Ryan Gaffney
- Manager: Sylvester McConnell

Provincial Champions
- Munster: Effin
- Leinster: Mount Leinster Rangers
- Ulster: Middletown Na Fianna
- Connacht: Moycullen

The 2011–12 All-Ireland Intermediate Club Hurling Championship was the eighth staging of the All-Ireland Intermediate Club Hurling Championship since its establishment by the Gaelic Athletic Association in 2004.

The All-Ireland final was played on 11 February 2012 at Croke Park in Dublin, between Mount Leinster Rangers from Carlow and Middletown Na Fianna from Armagh. Mount Leinster Rangers won the match by 1-13 to 1-11 to become the first Carlow club to claim an All-Ireland title.

== Connacht Intermediate Club Hurling Championship ==
=== Connacht semi-final ===
31 October 2011 Semi-final	Four Roads	2-11 - 1-13	BAllyhaunis	Athleague Grounds
	S Curley 0-7, M Kelly 1-2, J Coyne 1-1, P Kelly 0-1.		K Higgins 0-5, S Hoban 0-4, D O'Brien 1-0, C McCrudden 0-2, N Murphy 0-1, L McDermott 0-1.

=== Connacht final ===
13 November 2011 Final	Moycullen	3-14 - 0-16	Four Roads	Athleague Grounds
	C Hurney 3-1, E Noone 0-5 (4f), P Lydon 0-4, P Lydon 0-2, N Mannion, T Higgins 0-1 each.	Report	S Curley 0-8 (8f), P Kelly, B Donnelly 0-2 each, J Moran, E Rogerson, M Kelly, C Coyle 0-1 each.

== Leinster Intermediate Club Hurling Championship ==
=== Leinster quarter-finals ===
23 October 2011 Quarter-final	Gleanealy	1-08 - 1-12	Celbridge	Pearse Park
	J O'Neill 0-6, W O'Gorman 1-0, E Dunne 0-1, R Byrne 0-1.		C Kenny 1-2, B White 0-4, T Murphy 0-3, F Conway 0-2, L Quinn 0-1.

23 October 2011 Quarter-final	Kildakey	1-07 - 0-18	Danesfort	Páirc Tailteann
	N Kirby 0-5, G Kelly 1-0, P Geoghegan 0-1, D Doran 0-1.	Report	R Hogan 0-11, P Murphy 0-2, R Walsh 0-2, B O'Connor 0-1, S Duncan 0-1, R Walsh 0-1.

=== Leinster semi-finals ===
6 November 2011 Semi-final	Danesfort	1-08 - 1-10	Mount Leinster Rangers	Nowlan Park
	R Hogan 1-7, O Daly 0-1.	Report	D Murphy 0-5, E Byrne 1-1, J Coady 0-2, D Byrne 0-2.

6 November 2011 Semi-final	Celbridge	0-17 - 1-07	Adamstown	St Conleth's Park
	B White 0-6, G Keegan 0-3, D Butler 0-2, A McDonagh 0-2, M Moloney 0-2, L Quinn 0-1, T Murphy 0-1.	[https://www.hoganstand.com/county/kildare/article/index/157812 Report[	B Power 1-0, L French 0-3, D Brady 0-2, D Lawlor 0-1, S O'Gorman 0-1.

=== Leinster final ===
19 November 2011 Final	Celbridge	0-13 - 1-13	Mount Leinster Rangers	St Conleth's Park
	B White 0-7, C Kenny 0-2, L Quinn 0-2, M Moloney 0-1, G Keegan 0-1.		J Coady 1-2, D Murphy 0-5, HP Byrne 0-2, W Hickey 0-1, D Phelan 0-1, E Coady 0-1, P Nolan 0-1.	Referee: S Cleere (Kilkenny)

== Munster Intermediate Club Hurling Championship ==
=== Munster quarter-finals ===
30 October 2011 Quarter-final	Courcey Rovers	0-15 - 1-14	Ballyduff	Cloughduv Grounds
	Daire Lordan 0-8, S Lordan 0-2, D Hayes 0-1, N Murphy 0-1, D Murphy 0-1, C Lordan 0-1, G Minihane 0-1.		A Boyle 0-4, A O'Carroll 1-0, M Boyle 0-3, B O'Sullivan 0-3, P Boyle 0-2, L Boyle 0-1, PJ Connolly 0-1.	Referee: S Hourigan (Limerick)

30 October 2011 Quarter-final	Dunhill	1-04 - 0-13	Effin	Walsh Park
	T Quaid 0-9, D Moloney 0-2, Hugh O'Neill 0-1, Conor Kearney 0-1.		B Dunbar 1-0, S Casey 0-2, E Murphy 0-1, Jamie Ryan 0-1.	Referee: D O'Connell (Cork)

=== Munster semi-finals ===
6 November 2011 Semi-final	Effin	2-15 - 1-17	Aherlow	FitzGerald Park
	T Quaid 1-6, D Sheedy 1-2, D Moloney 0-4, C Hearney 0-2, P O'Kelly 0-1.		C Dillon 1-9, S Crogan 0-3, S Chapman 0-2, T Hanley 0-1, B Crogan 0-1, S Dillon 0-1.	Referee: D Kirwan (Cork)

6 November 2011 Semi-final	Ballyduff	3-08 - 2-10	Éire Óg, Ennis	Austin Stack Park
	M Boyle 1-3, G O'Brien 1-1, B O'Sullivan 0-4, A Boyle 1-0.		D O'Halloran 1-5, D Russell 0-4, F Flynn 1-0, D Reidy 0-1.	Referee: P Casey (Waterford)

=== Munster final ===
20 November 2011 Final	Effin	0-14 - 0-11	Ballyduff	Newcastle West Grounds
	T Quaid 0-4 (4f), N Quaid (2f, 1 '65'), T Rea 0-3 each, D Moloney 0-2, E Kelly, D Sheehy 0-1 each.	Report	PJ Connolly, M Boyle 0-3 each, B O'Sullivan (2f), A Boyle 0-2 each, B O'Grady 0-1.	Referee: M Wadding (Waterford)

== Ulster Intermediate Club Hurling Championship ==
=== Ulster quarter-finals ===
2 October 2011 Quarter-final	Kilclief Ben Dearg	4-08 - 2-25	Castleblayney	Páirc Esler
	C Hynds 2-1, F Conway 1-2, L Deegans 1-1, P Magee 0-3, T Mason 0-1.	Report	M McHugh 0-16, B Reilly 1-2, H Byrne 1-0, F Rafter 0-3, G Body 0-3, G Brady 0-1.

2 October 2011 Quarter-final	Middletown Na Fianna	2-21 - 1-11	Éire Óg Carrickmore	St Oliver Plunkett Park
	R Gaffney 1-3, D Carville 0-6, C McCann 1-2, C Carville 0-5, K McKernan 0-2, M Maguire 0-2, M Mone 0-1.		J Kelly 0-6, S Óg Grogan 1-0, C Grogan 0-2, P Hughes 0-2, A Kelly 0-1.

=== Ulster semi-finals ===
9 October 2011 Semi-final	Castleblayney	5-11 - 5-08	Lisbellaw St Patrick's	St Tiernach's Park
	H Byrne 3-0, M McHugh 0-8, F Rafter 2-1, B Reilly 0-2.		B McGarry 3-0, S Corrigan 1-3, R Bogue 1-2, D McGarry 0-2, D Teague 0-1.

9 October 2011 Semi-final	Keady Lámh Dhearg	2-09 - 3-11	Middletown Na Fianna	Casement Park

=== Ulster final ===
23 October 2011 Final	Middletown Na Fianna	5-19 - 0-05	Castleblayney	Páirc Esler
	R Gaffney 3-1 (1-0pen), M Mone 2-4, D Carvill 0-6 (4f), N McCann 0-3, B McCann 0-2, S Gaffney, C McCann 0-1 each.	Report	M McHugh 0-3f, D Connolly, G Brady 0-1 each.

== All-Ireland Intermediate Club Hurling Championship ==
=== All-Ireland quarter-final ===
27 November 2011 Quarter-final	Robert Emmetts	1-12 - 2-07	Moycullen	Emerald GAA Grounds
	M Callanan 0-5 (2f), P Atkinson 0-4, E Brennan 1-1, S Ryan 0-2.	Report	V Faherty 1-1, E Noone 0-3 (2f, 1 '65), Philip Lydon 1-0, Pat Lydon, D Kelly, N Mannion 0-1 each.

=== All-Ireland semi-finals ===
22 January 2012 Semi-final	Middletown Na Fianna	3-14 - 2-10	Effin	St Brendan's Park
	B McCann 1-2 (1f), D Carville 0-5 (5f), M Moran 1-1, R Gaffney 0-4, C Carville 1-0, N Currie, M McGuire 0-1 each;	Report	T Quaid 0-7 (7f), N Quaid 2-0, D Moloney, H O'Neill, D Sheehy 0-1 each.

22 January 2012 Semi-final	Mount Leinster Rangers	0-13 - 0-11	Robert Emmetts	Parnell Park
	D Murphy 0-7 (6f), J Coady, HP O'Byrne 0-2 each, D Byrne, E Doyle 0-1 each. Robert Emmets:	Report	M Callanan (2f), A Fitzgerald, K Bolger, P Atkinson (1f) 0-2 each, M Walsh, N Healy, E Brennan 0-1 each.

=== All-Ireland final ===
11 February 2012 Final	Mount Leinster Rangers	1–13 – 1–11	Middletown Na Fianna	Croke Park
	D Murphy 0-10 (0-9f, 0-1 65); E Doyle 1-1; D Phelan, E Byrne, 0-1 each.	Report	M Maguire 1-3; D Carvill 0-5 (0-5f); M Moan 0-2; P McBride 0-1.	Referee: P Casey (Waterford)

== Championship statistics ==
=== Top scorers ===
Rank	Player	Club	Tally	Total	Matches	Average
1	Tommy Quaid	Effin	1-26	29	4	7.25
1	Michael McHugh	Castleblayney	0-29	29	3	9.66
3	Denis Murphy	Mount Leinster Rangers	0-27	27	4	6.75
