= Mount Leinster Rangers GAA =

Gaelic games club in County Carlow, Ireland

Mount Leinster Rangers
- Raonaithe Stua Laighean
- Founded: 1987
- County: Carlow
- Nickname: MLR
- Colours: Black and Red
- Grounds: Kilcoltrim Grounds
- Coordinates: 52.590222°N 6.913675°W

Playing kits
Home Kit	Change Kit

Senior Club Championships
	All Ireland	Leinster champions	Carlow champions
Hurling:	0	1	13
Camogie:	-	-	2

Mount Leinster Rangers GAA Club is a Gaelic Athletic Association club in Borris, County Carlow, Ireland. The club fields teams in Hurling, Camogie and Gaelic football.

== History ==
Located in the village of Borris, on the Carlow–Kilkenny border, Mount Leinster Rangers GAA Club was founded in 1987. The new club was an amalgamation of three exiting clubs in the parish – Borris, Ballymurphy and Rathanna. Within a year of being formed, Mount Leinster Rangers had secured their own club grounds as well as winning the Carlow IHC for the first time. Further progress was made when the club's juvenile section started winning B-grade hurling competitions.

Mount Leinster Rangers made their big breakthrough in 2006 when they won their first Carlow SHC title, following a 0–17 to 2–08 win over St Mullin's. The club quickly became a new force in Carlow hurling and, after winning the Leinster Club IHC title, claimed the All-Ireland Club IHC in 2012 after beating Middletown Na Fianna in the final.

After winning three successive Carlow SHC titles between 2011 and 2013, Mount Leinster Rangers also won the Leinster Club SHC title during that period, before a 0–19 to 0–11 defeat by Portumna in the 2014 All-Ireland Club SHC final. Since then, the club has continued to be a regular winner of Carlow SHC titles, with their 13th and most recent title being won in 2026.

== Honours ==
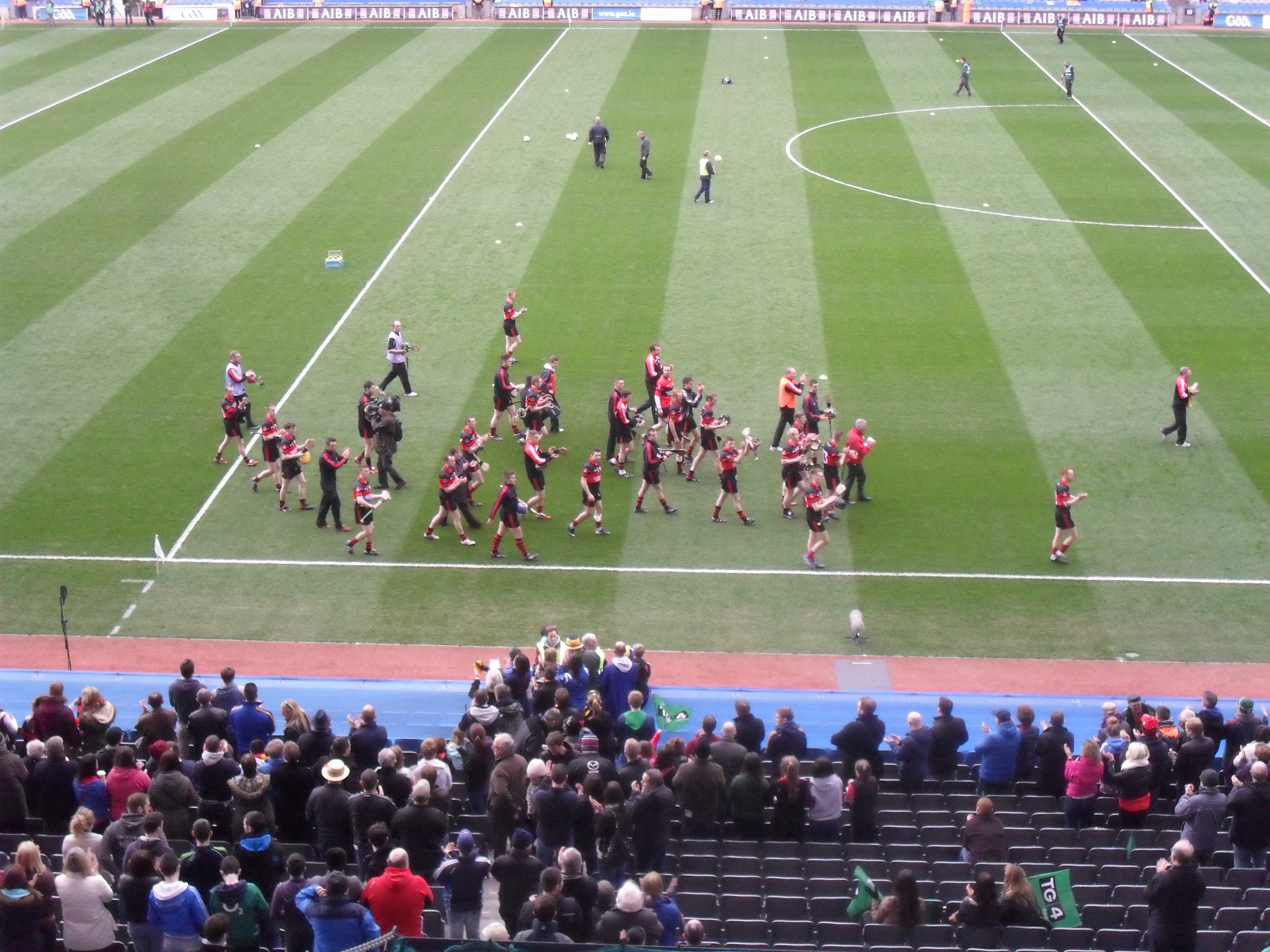
Mount Leinster players parading at the 2014 All-Ireland Senior Club Hurling Championship Final

=== Hurling ===
- Leinster Senior Club Hurling Championship (1): 2013
- Carlow Senior Hurling Championship (13): 2006, 2007, 2009, 2011, 2012, 2013, 2017, 2018, 2020, 2021, 2023, 2025, 2026
- All-Ireland Intermediate Club Hurling Championship (1): 2012
- Leinster Intermediate Club Hurling Championship (1): 2011
- Carlow Intermediate Hurling Championship (7): 1988, 1996, 2007, 2009, 2014, 2015, 2016
- Carlow Under 16 Division 1A Hurling Championship (?): 2025

=== Camogie ===
- Carlow Senior Camogie Championship (2): 2025, 2026

== Notable players ==
- Kevin McDonald: Joe McDonagh Cup–winner (2018, 2023)
- Denis Murphy: Christy Ring Cup–winner (2017)
- Chris Nolan: Joe McDonagh Cup–winner (2018, 2023)
