= Andy Smith (hurler) =

Galway hurler

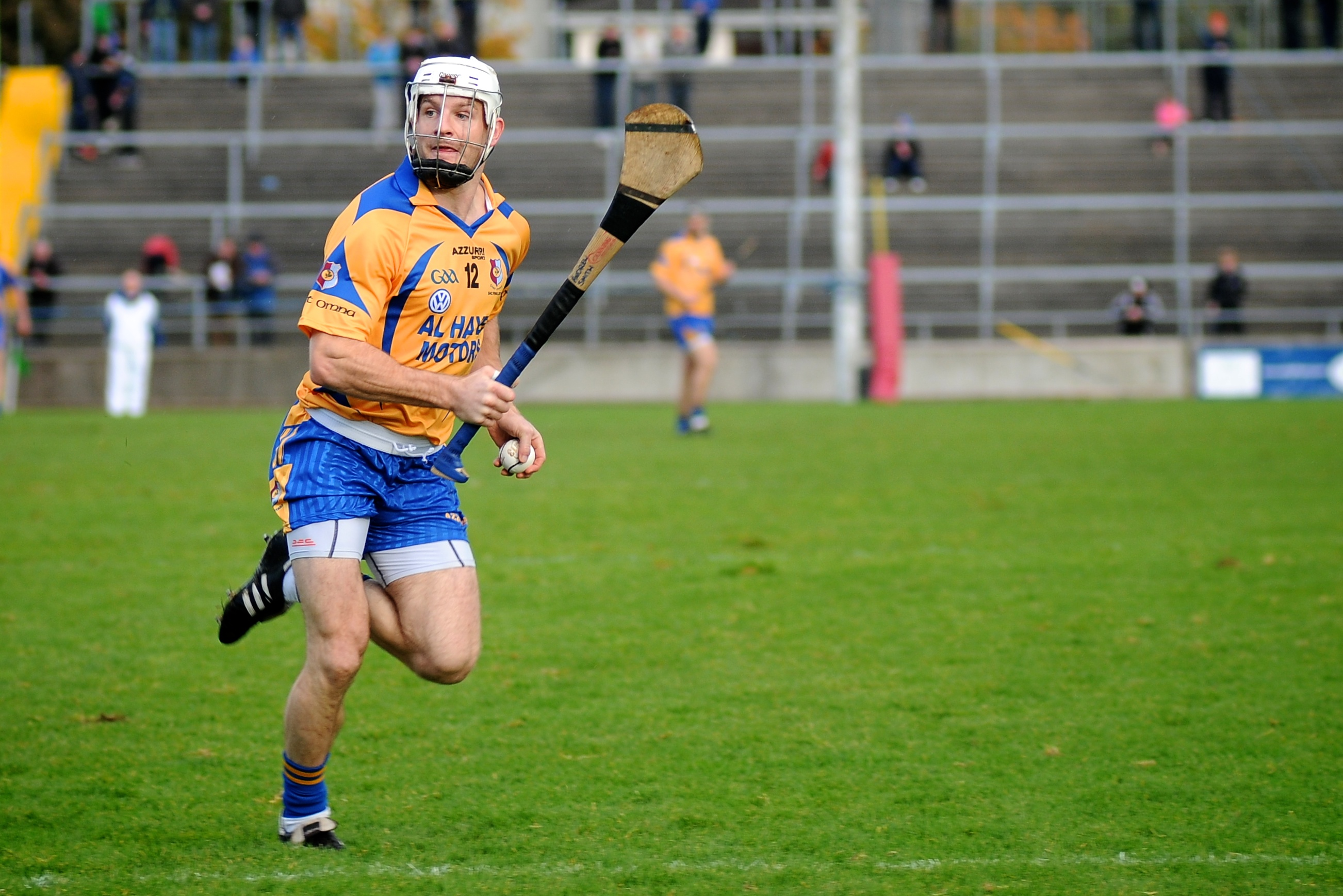
- Andy Smith in action for Portumna in 2013

Personal information
- Native name: Aindriú Mac Gabhann (Irish)
- Born: 8 July 1983 (age 43) Ballinasloe, Ireland
- Occupation: Sales representative
- Height: 1.75 m (5 ft 9 in)

Sport
- Sport: Hurling
- Position: Midfield
Club
- Years: Club
- 2001–: Portumna
Club titles
- Galway titles: 6
- Leinster titles: 3
- All-Ireland Titles: 4
Inter-county**
| Years | County | Apps (scores) |
| 2005–2016 | Galway | 40 (1–28) |
Inter-county titles
- Leinster titles: 1
- NHL: 1
- **Inter County team apps and scores correct as of 23 August 2012.

Andrew Smith (born 8 July 1983) is an Irish hurler who plays as a midfielder at senior level for the Galway county team.

Smith made his first appearance for the team during the 2005 championship and became a regular member of the starting fifteen over subsequent seasons. Since then he has won one Leinster winners' medal and one National Hurling League winners' medal.

Smith was left out of the Galway hurling panel which was named for winter training in October 2016.

At club level Smith is a four-time All-Ireland medalist with Portumna. In addition to this he has also won three Connacht medals and six county club championship medals.
