= Damien Hayes =

Galway hurler

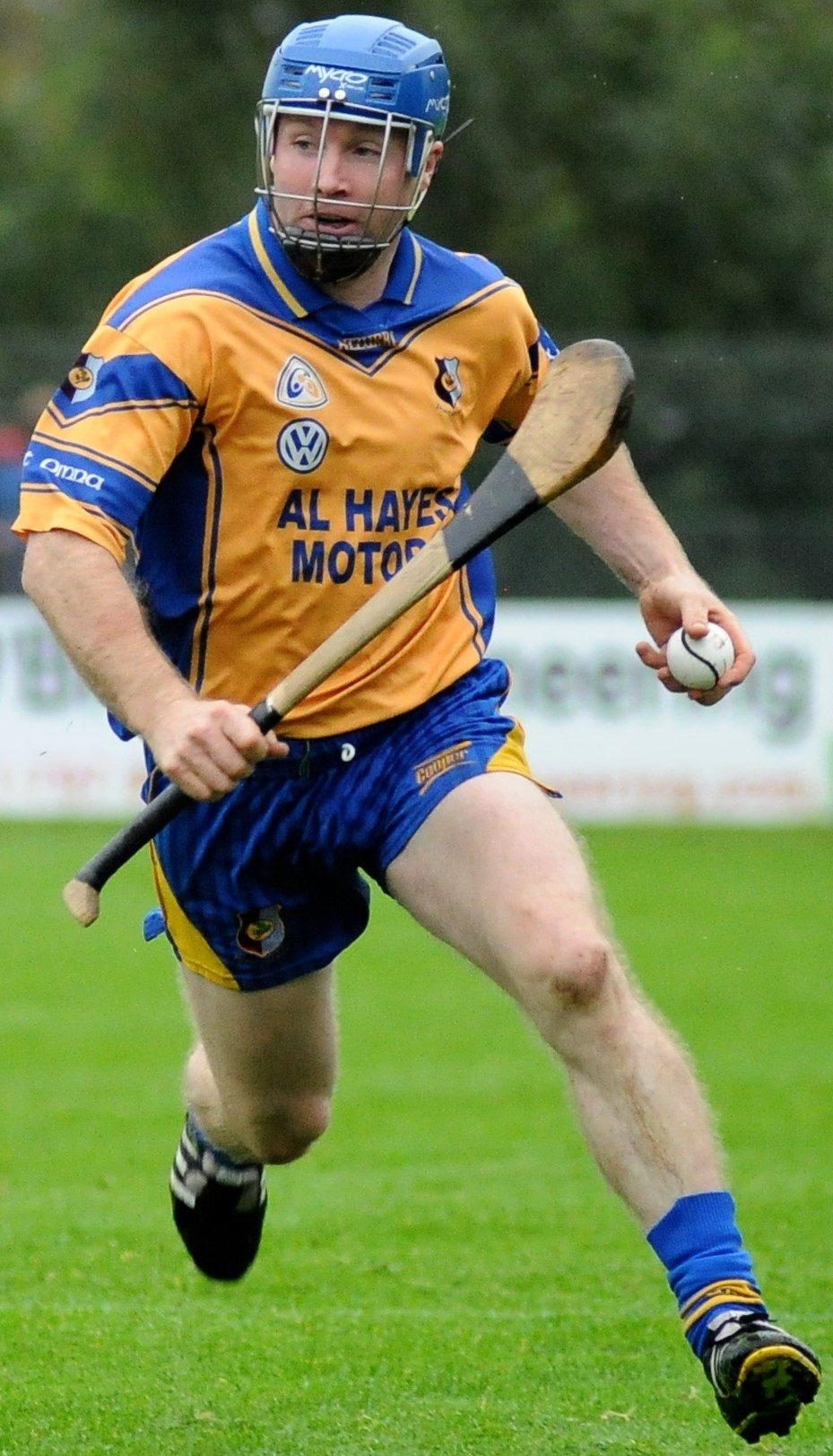
- Damien Hayes playing for Portumna in 2013

Personal information
- Native name: Damien Ó hAodha (Irish)
- Born: 18 February 1982 (age 44) Ballinasloe, Ireland
- Occupation: Sales representative
- Height: 1.7 m (5 ft 7 in)

Sport
- Sport: Hurling
- Position: Right corner forward
Club
- Years: Club
- 1999–2019: Portumna
Club titles
- Galway titles: 6
- Connacht titles: 3
- All-Ireland Titles: 4
Inter-county*
Years	County	Apps (scores)
2001–2014	Galway	52 (20–85)
Inter-county titles
- Connacht titles: 1
- NHL: 2
- All Stars: 3
- *Inter County team apps and scores correct as of 9 January 2015.

Damien Hayes (born 18 February 1982) is an Irish hurler who played as a corner-forward at senior level for the Galway county team from 2001 to 2015.

Hayes was born in Portumna, County Galway in 1982. He was educated locally and later studied at Limerick Institute of Technology (LIT) where he won the Ryan Cup. He currently works in the family Volkswagen Car Sales business in Portumna, Al Hayes Motors Ltd.

Hayes has had much success in the game of hurling. At inter-county he has won 2 All-Ireland minor medals, 2 All-Ireland senior runners-up medals, 2 National hurling League Medals (2004 and 2010) and 3 All-Star Award with Galway and a Railway Cup medal with Connacht. Hayes has also had an extremely successful hurling career at club level with Portumna.

He has won 6 Galway Senior Hurling titles and 3 All-Ireland Senior Club Hurling Championship medals in 2006, 2008 and 2009. He also has won 7 Senior League Titles with Portumna. Damien was awarded Connacht provincial Hurler of the year in 2005 and 2006. He has also been Galway's Hurler of the year on 3 occasions 2005, 2006 and 2010. Hayes was on the historic Galway team that won their first leinster title in 2012. He announced his retirement from inter-county hurling in January 2015.

Rugby union is Hayes's second love and he has previously won an All-Ireland Under-18 medal with Nenagh as a winger.

== Career statistics ==
=== Club ===
Team	Year	Connacht		All-Ireland		Total	
Team	Year	Apps	Score	Apps	Score	Apps	Score
Portumna	2003-04	1	0-02	1	1-01	2	1-03
Portumna	2005-06	1	0-04	2	1-05	3	1-09
Portumna	2007-08	1	1-04	2	1-04	3	2-08
Portumna	2008-09	0	0-00	2	4-03	2	4-03
Portumna	2009-10	0	0-00	2	0-04	2	0-04
Portumna	2013-14	0	0-00	2	0-04	2	0-04
Total		3	1-10	11	7-21	14	8-31
