= Kevin Hayes (hurler) =

Irish hurler

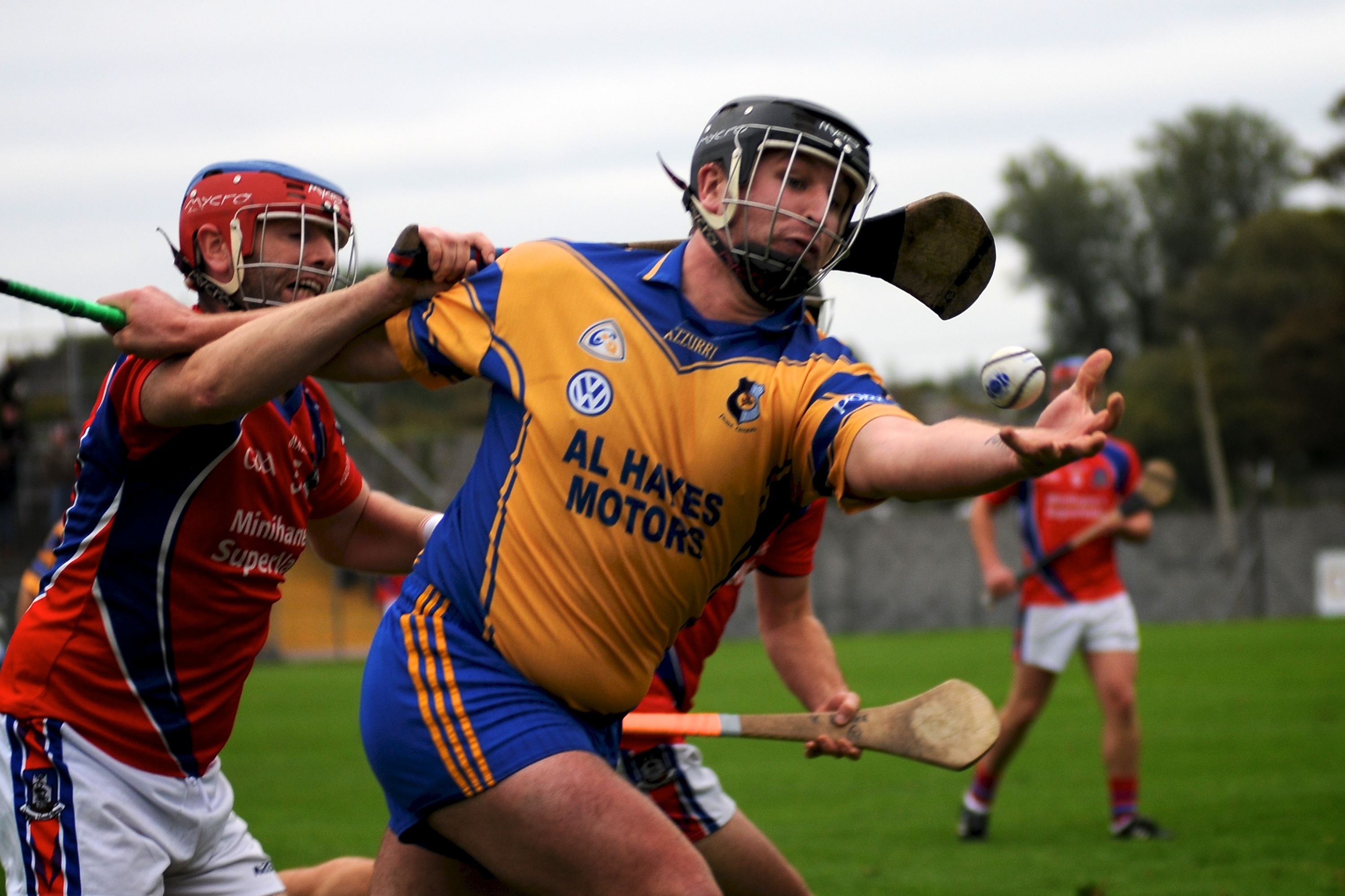
- Kevin Hayes (middle) in action for Portumna in 2013

Personal information
- Native name: Caoimhín Ó hAodha (Irish)
- Nickname: Chunky
- Born: 05 - 08 - 1983 Portumna
- Occupations: Health & Safety officer
- Height: 1.87 m (6 ft 2 in)

Sport
- Sport: Hurling
- Position: Centre forward
Club
- Years: Club
- 2000-2019: Portumna
Club titles
- Galway titles: 6
- Connacht titles: 4
- All-Ireland Titles: 4
Inter-county
Years	County	Apps (scores)
2005 -2010	Galway	14 (1-8)
Inter-county titles
- NHL: 1

Kevin "Chunky" Hayes (born 1983) plays hurling with his local club Portumna and has been a member of the Galway senior inter-county team since 2005.
