= 2017 Christy Ring Cup =

- Dates: 22 April 2017 – 10 June 2017
- Teams: 8
- Champions: Carlow (3rd title); Marty Kavanagh (captain); Colm Bonnar (manager)
- Runners-up: Antrim; Conor Carson (captain); Dominic McKinley (manager)

Tournament statistics
- Matches played: 14
- Goals scored: 47 (3.36 per match)
- Points scored: 494 (35.29 per match)
- Top scorer(s): Denis Murphy (0-45)

The 2017 Christy Ring Cup was the 13th staging of the Christy Ring Cup hurling championship since its establishment by the Gaelic Athletic Association in 2005. The competition began on 22 April 2017 and ended on 10 June 2017.

Meath were the 2016 champions and were promoted to the All-Ireland Senior Hurling Championship. Mayo returned to the Christy Ring Cup after gaining promotion from the Nicky Rackard Cup.

On 10 June 2017, Carlow won the Christy Ring Cup following a 5-23 to 4-15 defeat of Antrim. This was their third Christy Ring Cup title, their first in eight seasons.

== Format ==
The 2017 Christy Ring Cup begins in a double-elimination format which ensures that each team plays at least two games before being eliminated, and at least three games in total (including the relegation play-off). At the quarter-final stage, the competition becomes straight knockout. For clarity, the fixtures and draw details are explained in the section for each round below.

== Team changes ==
=== To Championship ===
Relegated from the All-Ireland Senior Hurling Championship

- Carlow

Promoted from the Nicky Rackard Cup

- Mayo

=== From Championship ===
Promoted to the All-Ireland Senior Hurling Championship

- Meath

Relegated to the Nicky Rackard Cup

- Derry

== Teams ==
=== General Information ===
County	Cup Titles	Last Cup Title	Position in 2016 championship
Antrim	1	2006	Runners-up
Carlow	2	2009	Group Stage (Leinster Senior Hurling Championship)
Down	1	2013	Semi-finals
Kildare	1	2014	Semi-finals
London	1	2012	Quarter-finals
Mayo	0	-	Champions (Nicky Rackard Cup)
Roscommon	0	-	Quarter-finals
Wicklow	0	-	Round 2

=== Personnel and kits ===
County	Manager	Captain(s)	Sponsor
Antrim	Dominic McKinley; Terence McNaughton		Creagh Concrete
Carlow	Colm Bonnar		tickets.ie
Down	Michael Johnston		
Kildare	Joe Quaid		Brady Family
London			
Mayo	J. P. Coen		Intersport Elvery's
Roscommon			John Doorly
Wicklow			

== Round 1 ==
All eight teams play in Round 1.

22 April 2017	Down	2-24 - 1-20	Roscommon	McKenna Park, Ballycran
13:00	P Sheehan 0-15f; M Magee 1-2; E Sands 1-1; D Hughes 0-1; C O'Prey 0-1; O McManus 0-1; G Johnston 0-1; C Woods 0-1; G Hughes 0-1.	Report	S Curley 0-6 (5f); N Connaughton 1-2; R Fallon 0-5f; J Coyne 0-3; E Flanagan 0-2; T Seale 0-1; H Rooney 0-1.	Referee: M Murtagh (Westmeath)

22 April 2017	Carlow	2-22 - 3-20 (aet)	Antrim	Dr. Cullen Park, Carlow
15:00	D Murphy 0-16, 0-11f, 0-2 65s, M Kavanagh 2-1, P Coady, C Nolan 0-2 each, J Murphy 0-1.	Report	N McManus 1-11, 0-9f, 0-1 '65, C Clarke 1-2, N McKenna 1-0, P Shiels 0-2, P McGill, S McCrory, E Campbell, C Johnson, J McNaughton 0-1 each.	Referee: C McAllister (Cork)

22 April 2017	Mayo	0-16 - 0-17	Kildare	James Stephens Park, Ballina
15:00	K Higgins 0-10 (9f), J NcManus 0-3, D McLoughlin, C Scahill, S Regan 0-1 each.	Report	D Reidy 0-13 (11f, 2 '65s), J Sheridan 0-2, J Mulhall and M Delaney 0-1 each.	Referee: J Murphy (Limerick)

23 April 2017	Wicklow	0-17 - 0-16	London	Joule Park, Aughrim
13:00	C Moorehouse 0-10 (6f, 1 65), A O'Brien, D Masterson 0-2 each, G O'Brien, D Staunton, E McCormack 0-1 each.	Report	K O'Loughlin 0-9 (4fs, 2 65s), E Kenny 0-2, E Cooney, M Dwyer, S Lawless, N Rogers, S O'Donnell 0-1 each.	Referee: J O'Brien (Laois)

== Round 2 ==
=== Round 2A ===
Contested by the four winners of Round 1. The winning teams advance to the semi-finals, the losing teams to the 'official' quarter-finals.

29 April 2017	Antrim	3-15 - 0-11	Down	Páirc Mhuire, Cushendall
2.00 PM	C Clarke 1-7 (5f, '65'); Ciaran Johnston 2-0 pen; N McKenna, E Campbell, C McCann 0-2 each; P McGill, Conor Johnston 0-1 each.	Report	S Nicholson 0-7f; D McManus 0-3; E Sands, G Johnston 0-1 each.

29 April 2017	Kildare	2-19 - 3-18	Wicklow	St. Conleth's Park, Newbridge
3.00 PM	D Reidy 0-11 (7f); J Mulhall, C Bonus 1-0; P Divilly, B Byrne, J Sheridan 0-2 each; M Delaney, R Ryan 0-1 each.	Report	C Moorehouse 0-9 (7f, 1 '65); A O'Brien 2-2; P Doyle 1-0; D Staunton 0-3; D Masterson 0-2; R Reddy 0-1.

=== Round 2B ===
Contested by the four losers of Round 1. The winning teams advance to the quarter-finals, The two losing teams contest the Relegation Playoff.

29 April 2017	Carlow	5-18 - 2-07	Mayo	Dr. Cullen Park, Carlow
3.00 PM	J Doyle 2-2, K McDonald 2-1, M Kavanagh 1-4 (2f), J Murphy 0-4, E Byrne, J Kavanagh 0-2 each, D English (f), D Byrne, C Nolan 0-1 each.	Report	K Feeney 1-6, (4f, 1 '65), J McManus 1-0, D McLoughlin 0-1.

29 April 2017	Roscommon	1-09 - 4-24	London	Dr. Hyde Park, Roscommon
6.00 PM	S Curley 0-4 (2f, 1 '65); J Coyne 1-0; R Fallon 0-3 (2f); P Kelly, E Costello, E Flanagan (f) 0-1 each.	Report	K O'Loughlin 1-7 (3f, 1 '65); S Lawless 1-3; M Duggan, PJ Rowe 1-0 each; E Kenny, M Dwyer, E Cooney 0-3 each; E Kelly 0-2 (2f), B Regan, T Healy, S O'Donnell 0-1 each.

== Quarter-finals ==
The two losers of round 2A (who won a match and lost a match) play the two winners of round 2B (who lost a match and won a match). These two matches are referred to as quarter-finals, with the winners playing the winners of round 2A in the semi-finals.

6 May 2017	Kildare	0-15 - 1-23	Carlow	St. Conleth's Park, Newbridge
3.00 PM	P Divilly 0-6(5f), M Purcell and J Sheridan(4f) 0-4 each, B Byrne 0-1.	Report	D Murphy 0-10f, P Coady (1f) and M Kavanagh 0-4 each, J Doyle 1-2, C Nolan, J Murphy, D Byrne, J Nolan and E Byrne 0-1 each.

7 May 2017	London	0-19 - 2-19	Down	Páirc na hÉireann, Birmingham
	K O'Loughlin (0-5, 3f), E Kenny (0-4), D Roberts (0-4); S Bardon (0-3), M Dwyer (0-1), PJ Rowe (0-1), E Kelly (0-1f).	Report	E Sands (2-1), C O'Prey (0-6, 3f), S Nicholson (0-5, 2f), D Toner (0-4), D Hughes (0-1); C Mageean (0-1), C Taggart (0-1).	Referee: J Keane

== Semi-finals ==
The winners of round 2A play the winners of the two quarter-finals.

20 May 2017	Carlow	0-24 - 2-08	Wicklow	Dr. Cullen Park, Carlow
15:00	D Murphy 0-8, 0-6f, J M Nolan 0-5, M Kavanagh 0-3, J Kavanagh, C Nolan, P Coady 0-2 each, K McDonald, E Byrne 0-1 each.	Report	A O’Brien 0-4, 0-1f, E McCormack and G O’Brien 1-0 each, D Staunton, J Henderson, D Masterson (f), R Keddy 0-1 each.	Referee: J Keane (Galway)

20 May 2017	Antrim	4-23 - 0-15	Down	Páirc Mhuire, Cushendall
17:00	C Clarke 2-7, (7f) Conor Johnston 2-1, N McManus 0-6, (1f) C McKinley, C McCann 0-3 each, C Carson 0-2, P Burke 0-1.	Report	C O’Prey 0-4, (3f, 0-1 sideline), D Toner 0-3, S Nicholson, C Mageean, M Magee 0-2 each, C Egan, P Sheehan 0-1 each.	Referee: J Murphy (Limerick)

== Final ==
The winners of this year's Christy Ring Cup (tier 2) enter this year's All-Ireland Senior Hurling Championship in the preliminary round of the All-Ireland qualifiers (passed at GAA congress in February 2017). They are also promoted to play in the qualifier group of next year's Leinster Senior Hurling Championship.

10 June 2017
17.00

Carlow	5-23 - 4-15	Antrim
J Doyle 4-1, D Murphy 0-11 (11f), M Kavanagh 1-1, D Byrne 0-3, JM Nolan 0-3, R Kelly 0-1, P Coady 0-1, C Nolan 0-1, J Murphy 0-1 (1f)	Report	C Clarke 2-9 (7f, 1 '65), N McManus 1-2 (1-1f), E Campbell 1-0, C McKinley 0-1, P Shiels 0-1, P McGill 0-1, D McKernan 0-1

Croke Park, Dublin
Referee: M Murtagh (Westmeath)

== Bracket ==
Round 1 Round 2B
Carlow	2-22
Antrim	3-20
Down	2-24
Roscommon	1-20
Roscommon	1-09
London	4-24
Carlow	5-18
Mayo	2-07
Mayo	0-16
Kildare	0-17
Wicklow	0-17
London	0-16

Round 2A; Quarter-finals
Antrim	3-15
Down	0-11
London	0-19
Down	2-19
Kildare	0-15
Carlow	1-23
Kildare	2-19
Wicklow	3-18

Semi-finals
Antrim	4-23
Down	0-15
Carlow	0-24
Wicklow	2-08

Final
Antrim	4-15
Carlow	5-23
Relegation Playoff
Mayo	1-25
Roscommon	2-12

== Relegation playoff ==
Contested by the two losing teams from round 2B. Both these teams lost their first two matches. Normally Roscommon would have been relegated as they lost this play-off match. Due to the major reorganisation of hurling in September 2018, Roscommon remained in the Christy Ring Cup.

20 May 2017
17:00
Bottom play-off

Mayo	1-25 - 2-12	Roscommon
K Feeney (0-11, 8f ), J McManus (0-6 ), K McDermott (0-3 ), D McTigue (1-0 ), D Kenny (0-1 ), B Hunt (0-1 ), C Scahill (0-1 ), P Hickey (0-1 ), D McLoughlin (0-1 )	Report	C Dolan (1-3, 1f ), R Fallon (0-3,3f ), P Kelly (0-3 ), E Flanagan (1-0 ), N Connaughton (0-1 ), S Curley (0-1, 1f ), M Beirne (0-1, 1f ).

Páirc Seán Mac Diarmada, Carrick

== Stadiums and locations ==
County	Location	Province	Stadium	Capacity
Antrim	Cushendall	Ulster	Páirc Mhuire	
Carlow	Carlow	Leinster	Dr Cullen Park	
Down	Ballycran	Ulster	McKenna Park	
Kildare	Newbridge	Leinster	St Conleth's Park	
London	South Ruislip	Britain	McGovern Park	
Mayo	Ballina	Connacht	James Stephens Park	
Roscommon	Athleague	Connacht	Athleague Sportsfield	
Wicklow	Aughrim	Leinster	Joule Park	

== Championship statistics ==
Top scorers overall

Rank	Player	Team	Tally	Total
1	Denis Murphy	Carlow	0-45	45
2	Ciarán Clarke	Antrim	6-25	43
3	James Doyle	Carlow	7-05	26
4	Marty Kavanagh	Carlow	4-13	25
4	Neil McManus	Antrim	2-19	25
6	Kevin O'Loughlin	London	1-21	24
6	David Reidy	Kildare	0-24	24
8	Kenny Feeney	Mayo	1-17	20
9	Christy Moorehouse	Wicklow	0-19	19
10	Paul Sheehan	Down	0-16	16

Top scorers in a single game

Rank	Player	Team	Tally	Total	Opposition
1	Denis Murphy	Carlow	0-16	16	Antrim
2	Ciarán Clarke	Antrim	2-09	15	Carlow
2	Paul Sheehan	Down	0-15	15	Roscommon
4	Neil McManus	Antrim	1-11	14	Carlow
5	James Doyle	Carlow	4-01	13	Antrim
5	Ciarán Clarke	Antrim	2-07	13	Down
5	David Reidy	Kildare	0-13	13	Mayo
8	David Reidy	Kildare	0-11	11	Wicklow
8	Denis Murphy	Carlow	0-11	11	Antrim
8	Kenny Feeney	Mayo	0-11	11	Roscommon
