= Denis Murphy (Carlow hurler) =

Irish hurler

Personal information
- Native name: Donncha Ó Murchú (Irish)
- Born: 1990 (age 35–36) Borris, County Carlow, Ireland
- Occupation: Teacher

Sport
- Sport: Hurling
- Position: Full-forward
Club
- Years: Club
- Mount Leinster Rangers
Club titles
- Carlow titles: 5
- Leinster titles: 1
Inter-county*
Years	County	Apps (scores)
2010	Carlow	3 (1-8)
Inter-county titles
- Leinster titles: 0
- All-Irelands: 0
- NHL: 0
- All Stars: 0
- *Inter County team apps and scores correct as of 15:46, 9 February 2014.

Denis Murphy (born 1990) is an Irish hurler who plays as a full-forward for the Carlow senior team.

Born in Borris, County Carlow, Murphy first played competitive hurling whilst at school in Borris Vocational School. He made his first impression on the inter-county scene as a dual player at minor level before later joining the under-21 hurling team. He made his senior debut during the 2010 championship. Murphy only played for one championship season and enjoyed little success.

At club level Murphy is a one-time Leinster medallist with Mount Leinster Rangers. He also won five championship medals.

== Career statistics ==
=== Club ===
As of match played 19 November 2017.

Team	Year	Leinster		All-Ireland		Total	
Team	Year	Apps	Score	Apps	Score	Apps	Score
Mount Leinster Rangers	2006-07	1	0-05	0	0-00	1	0-05
Mount Leinster Rangers	2012-13	1	0-05	0	0-00	1	0-05
Mount Leinster Rangers	2013-14	3	0-26	2	0-16	5	0-42
Mount Leinster Rangers	2017-18	2	0-07	0	0-00	2	0-07
Total		7	0-43	2	0-16	9	0-59

== Honours ==
=== Team ===
Mount Leinster Rangers

- Leinster Senior Club Hurling Championship (1): 2013
- Carlow Senior Hurling Championship (5): 2007, 2009, 2011, 2012, 2013
- All-Ireland Intermediate Club Hurling Championship (1): 2012
- Leinster Intermediate Club Hurling Championship (1): 2011
