= 2013–14 All-Ireland Senior Club Hurling Championship =

All-Ireland Senior Club Hurling Championship 2013–14

Championship Details
- Dates: 13 October 2013 – 17 March 2014
- Teams: 17

All Ireland Champions
- Winners: Portumna (4th win)
- Captain: Ollie Canning
- Manager: Frank Canning

All Ireland Runners-up
- Runners-up: Mount Leinster Rangers
- Captain: David Phelan
- Manager: Tom Mullally

Provincial Champions
- Munster: Na Piarsaigh
- Leinster: Mount Leinster Rangers
- Ulster: Loughgiel Shamrocks
- Connacht: Not Played

Championship Statistics
- Matches Played: 16
- Total Goals: 41 (2.56 per game)
- Total Points: 441 (27.56 per game)
- Top Scorer: Denis Murphy (0–42)

The 2013–14 All-Ireland Senior Club Hurling Championship was the 44th staging of the All-Ireland championship since its establishment in 1970. The championship began on 13 October 2013 and ended on 17 March 2014.

St. Thomas's were the defending champions, however, they failed to emerge from the county championship in Galway.

== Team summaries ==
=== Participating clubs ===
Team	County	Captain	Manager(s)	Most recent success		
Team	County	Captain	Manager(s)	All-Ireland	Provincial	County
Ballyboden St Endas	Dublin	Conal Keaney	Jonny Kenny			2011
Ballygalget	Down	Christopher Conlan			2005	2010
Camross	Laois	Tomás Burke	Arien Delaney		1996	2007
Castletown Geoghegan	Westmeath	Joe Clarke				2004
Clara	Kilkenny	Austin Murphy	Michael Purcell			1986
Lisbellaw St. Patrick's	Fermanagh	Seán Corrigan	Adie McPhillips; Brian Johnston			2012
Loughgiel Shamrocks	Antrim	Liam Watson	P. J. O'Mullan	2012	2012	2012
Loughmore-Castleiney	Tipperary	Ciarán McGrath	Declan Laffan		2007	2007
Midleton	Cork	Pádraig O'Shea	Peter Smith	1988	1987	1991
Mount Leinster Rangers	Carlow	David Phelan	Tom Mullally			2012
Na Piarsaigh	Limerick	James O'Brien	Seán Stack		2011	2011
Oulart-the Ballagh	Wexford	Darren Nolan	Martin Storey			2012
Passage	Waterford	Eoin Kelly	Peter Queally			
Portumna	Galway	Ollie Canning	Frank Canning	2009	2007	2009
Sixmilebridge	Clare	Aidan Quilligan	John O'Meara	1996	2000	2002
Slaughtneil	Derry	Gareth O'Kane	Mickey Glover			2000

== Fixtures/results ==
=== Leinster Senior Club Hurling Championship ===
3 November 2013 Quarter-final	Castletown Geoghegan	1–13 – 1–15	Mount Leinster Rangers	Cusack Park
	N O'Brien (0–10, 8f), A Mangan (1–0), R Whelan (0–1), D Fennell (0–1), A Clarke (0–1).	Report	D Murphy (0–9, 8f), E Byrne (1–1), D Byrne (0–2), G Kelly (0–1), D Phelan (0–1), J Coady (0–1).	Referee: F Smith

3 November 2013 Quarter-final	Camross	1–10 – 1–18	Kilcormac/Killoughey	O'Moore Park
	Z Keenan (0–5, 3f), T Burke (1–0), D Keenan (0–1) M Collier (0–1), C Collier (0–1), A Moore (0–1), D Delaney (0–1).	Report	Ciaran Slevin (0–7, 5f), J Gorman (1–1), P Geraghty (0–3), D Kilmartin (0–2), K Leonard (0–2), C Mahon (0–1), D Currams (0–1), T Geraghty (0–1).	Referee: S Cleere

3 November 2013 Quarter-final	Clara	2–11 – 0–20	Oulart-the Ballagh	Nowlan Park
	K Hogan (0–4, 3f), C Bolger (1–0), J Nolan (1–0), Liam Ryan (0–3), C Phelan (0–2), Lester Ryan (0–2).	Report	G Sinnott (0–6), N Kirwan (0-4f), D Mythen (0–4), R Jacob (0–3, 1'65), D Redmond (0–2), C O'Leary (0–1).	Referee: J McGrath

17 November 2013 Semi-final	Mount Leinster Rangers	1–17 – 3–9	Ballyboden St. Enda's	Dr. Cullen Park
	D Murphy (0–9, 7fs, 1 65, 1 pen), E Byrne (1–2), Derek Byrne (0–3), Diarmuid Byrne (sideline), P Coady, J Coady (0–1 each).	Report	P Ryan (1–4, 1–0 pen, 2fs), C McCormack (1–2), G Corrigan (1–1), C Keaney, F McGarry (0–1 each).	Referee: J Owens (Wexford)

17 November 2013 Semi-final	Kilcormac/Killoughey	2–11 – 1–18	Oulart-the Ballagh	O'Connor Park
	Ciarán Slevin (1–7, 1-5f, 0-2'65), D Currams (1–0), T Geraghty (0–2), K Leonard (0–1), P Geraghty (0–1).	Report	R Jacob (1–5, 0-3f), D Redmond (0–4), D Mythen (0–2), G Sinnott (0–2), C O'Leary (0–2), M Jacob (0–2), D Nolan (0–1).	Referee: B Kelly (Westmeath)

1 December 2013 Final	Mount Leinster Rangers	0–11 – 0–8	Oulart-the Ballagh	Nowlan Park
	D Murphy 0–8 (6f), P Coady, Derek Byrne, Diarmuid Byrne 0–1 each.	Report	D Mythen, R Jacob (1f) 0–2 each, D Redmond, D Nolan, C O'Leary, E Moore (f) 0–1 each	Referee: J Keenan (Wicklow)

=== Munster Senior Club Hurling Championship ===
27 October 2013 Quarter-final	Loughmore-Castleiney	2–18 – 3–17	Na Piarsaigh	Semple Stadium
	N McGrath (0–9, 4fs, 1 sideline), L McGrath (1–3, 3fs), C Hennessy (1–1), C McGrath (0–2), T King, J McGrath, E Sweeney (0–1 each).	Report	D Dempsey (2–1), K Downes (1–2), S Dowling (0–5, 4fs), K Ryan, P Gleeson (0–2 each), D Breen, J O’Brien, W O’Donoghue, K Kennedy, A Breen (0–1 each).	Referee: C McAllister (Cork)

10 November 2013 Semi-final	Na Piarsaigh	0–20 – 3–9	Passage	Gaelic Grounds
	K. Downes 0–6; S. Dowling 0–5 (0–3 fs); A. Breen and P. Gleeson 0–3 each; K. Kennedy, A. Dempsey and W. O’Donoghue 0–1 each.	Report	O. Connors 1–4 (0–2 65s, 0–1 f); E. Kelly 1–1 (1–0 pen); J. Whitty 1–0; K. Fitzgerald 0–2; T. Connors and J. McClean 0–1.	Referee: C Lyons (Cork)

17 November 2013 Semi-final	Midleton	1–13 – 1–17	Sixmilebridge	Páirc Uí Chaoimh
	C Lehane 1–5 (0–1’65, 0-3f), P Haughney, A Ryan 0–2 each, C Walsh, P Dowling, L O’Farrell, T Wallace (0-1f) 0–1 each.	Report	J Shanahan 0–6(0-4f), A Mulready 1–1, N Gilligan 0–3 (0-2f), P Sheehan 0–2, K Lynch, C Morey, S Golden, S Morey, C Deasy 0–1 each.	Referee: J Ryan (Tipperary)

24 November 2013 Final	Sixmilebridge	0–8 – 4–14	Na Piarsaigh	Cusack Park
	N Gilligan 0–3 (0-3f), S Golden 0–2, C Morey 0–1, J Shanahan 0–1 (0-1f), K Lynch 0–1	Report	K Ryan 1–3, A Breen 1–2, S Dowling 0–5 (0-4f), K Downes 1–0, D Sheppard 1–0, A Dempsey 0–2, D Dempsey, P Gleeson 0–1 each.	Referee: C Lyons (Cork)

=== Ulster Senior Club Hurling Championship ===
13 October 2013 Semi-final	Loughgiel Shamrocks	1–16 – 1–9	Ballygalget	Owenbeg
15:30	B McCarry (1–4), L Watson (0–6, 4f), S Casey (0–2), D McKinley (0–1), D Laverty (0–1), E McCloskey (0–1), B McAuley (0–1).	Report	D Toner (0–5, 2f), G Johnson (1–1, 0-1f), C Bailie (0–2, 1f); G Dynes (0–1).

13 October 2013 Semi-final	Lisbellaw St. Patrick's	0–7 – 4–18	Slaughtneil	O'Neill Park
15:30	S Corrigan (0–5), R Bogue (0–2).	Report	B Rodgers (3–0), G O'Kane (0–6), O O'Doherty (1–1), C McKaigue (0–3), C O'Doherty (0–3), S McGuigan (0–2), G Bradley (0–1), D Kearney (0–1), O O'Kane (0–1).

27 October 2013 Final	Slaughtneil	1–15 – 3–14	Loughgiel Shamrocks	Celtic Park
	C McKenna (1–3, 2f), G O’Kane (0–6, 6f), C McKaigue (0–4, 1f), G Bradley (0–2).	Report	E McCloskey (2–2), L Watson (0–7, 6f), S Casey (1–0), B McAuley (0–2), T McCloskey (0–1), D Laverty (0–1), B McCarry (0–1).	Referee: B Sweeney (Cavan)

=== All-Ireland Senior Club Hurling Championship ===
8 February 2014 Semi-final	Loughgiel Shamrocks	2–11 – 0–18	Mount Leinster Rangers	Páirc Esler
15:00	L Watson (1–6, 0-3f), B McCarry (1–0), E McCloskey (0–2), S Casey (0–1), J Scullion (0–1), M McFadden (0–1).	Report	D Murphy (0–11, 7f), E Doyle (0–2), Diarmuid Byrne (0–1), Derek Byrne (0–1), D Phelan (0–1), J Coady (0–1).

8 February 2014 Semi-final	Na Piarsaigh	1–11 – 1–15	Portumna	Semple Stadium
17:00	S Dowling 1–4 (0-4frees, 1-0pen), R Lynch 0–3 (2 lineballs), K Downes 0–2, K Ryan, P Gleeson 0–1.	Report	J Canning 0–9 (0-6frees, 1 lineball), R O'Meara 1–2, O Canning, D Hayes, K Hayes, A Smith 0–1 each.

17 March 2014 Final	Mount Leinster Rangers	0–11 – 0–19	Portumna	Croke Park
14:00	D Murphy (0-05, 0-04f), P Coady (0-03), E Byrne (0-01), J Coady (0-01), H P O'Byrne (0-01).	Report	J Canning (0–10, 0-08f), D Hayes (0-03), O Canning (0–03), K Hayes (0-02), R O'Meara (0-01).	Referee: B Kelly (Westmeath)

== Championship statistics ==
=== Miscellaneous ===
- Mount Leinster Rangers win the Leinster title for the first time in their history. It is the first time that any team from Carlow has claimed a Leinster title at senior level.
- Oulart-the Ballagh lose the Leinster final for the fourth consecutive year.

== Top scorers ==
Top scorers overall

#	Player	Club	Tally	Total	Games	Average
1	Denis Murphy	Mount Leinster Rangers	0–42	42	5	8.40
2	Liam Watson	Loughgiel Shamrocks	1–19	23	4	5.75
2	Shane Dowling	Na Piarsaigh	1–19	23	4	5.75
3	Joe Canning	Portumna	0–19	19	2	9.50
4	Ciarán Slevin	Kilcormac/Killoughey	1–14	17	2	8.50
5	Kevin Downes	Portumna	2–10	16	4	4.00
6	Rory Jacob	Oulart-the Ballagh	1–10	13	3	4.33
7	Gareth O'Kane	Slaughtneil	0–12	12	2	6.00
8	Benny McCarry	Portumna	2-05	11	3	3.66
8	Eddie McCloskey	Loughgiel Shamrocks	2-05	11	3	3.66

Top scorers in a single game

#	Player	Club	Tally	Total	Opposition
1	Denis Murphy	Mount Leinster Rangers	0–11	11	Loughgiel Shamrocks
2	Ciarán Slevin	Kilcormac/Killoughey	1–7	10	Oulart-the Ballagh
2	Niall O'Brien	Castletown Geoghegan	0–10	10	Mount Leinster Rangers
2	Joe Canning	Portumna	0–10	10	Mount Leinster Rangers
3	Brendan Rogers	Slaughtneil	3–0	9	Lisbellaw St. Patrick's
3	Liam Watson	Loughgiel Shamrocks	1–6	9	Mount Leinster Rangers
3	Joe Canning	Portumna	0–9	9	Na Piarsaigh
3	Noel McGrath	Loughmore-Castleiney	0–9	9	Na Piarsaigh
3	Denis Murphy	Mount Leinster Rangers	0–9	9	Castletown Geoghegan
3	Denis Murphy	Mount Leinster Rangers	0–9	9	Ballyboden St. Enda's
