= 2010 All-Ireland Senior Club Hurling Championship final =

2010 All-Ireland Senior Club Hurling Final
- Event: 2009–10 All-Ireland Senior Club Hurling Championship
Ballyhale Shamrocks	Portumna
1-19	0-17
- Date: 17 March 2010
- Venue: Croke Park, Dublin
- Referee: Cathal McAllister (Cork)

The 2010 All-Ireland Senior Club Hurling Championship Final was a hurling match played at Croke Park, Dublin, the headquarters of the Gaelic Athletic Association, on Wednesday, 17 March 2010, to determine the winners of the 2009–10 All-Ireland Senior Club Hurling Championship. The match was won by Ballyhale Shamrocks of Kilkenny, who beat Portumna of Galway by 1–19 to 0–17. The referee was Cathal McAllister from Cork.

The win gave Ballyhale Shamrocks a record-breaking fifth All-Ireland title, their first since 2007, and put them alone at the top of club hurling's roll of honour, one title ahead their great provincial rivals from Birr. Meanwhile, Portumna had won the previous two championships and were hoping to secure an unprecedented third All-Ireland title in-a-row, thus cementing their reputation as the greatest club hurling team of all time.

== Background ==
Prior to the 2010 final, Ballyhale Shamrocks and Portumna had previously met only once in the All-Ireland championship. That meeting took place in the All-Ireland semi-final of the 2008-09 championship. That game ended in a 5–11 to 1–16 victory for Portumna, who subsequently went on to claim the All-Ireland title for a second successive year.

Both teams went into the final with history beckoning. Portumna were only one game away from being immortalised as the greatest club hurling team of all time by claiming an unprecedented third successive All-Ireland title and a remarkable fourth in five championship seasons. The club had already come to be regarded as possibly the greatest club side of all time. Winning an elusive three-in-a-row would close the argument on club hurling's greatest team. Ballyhale Shamrocks were also out to make history by attempting to capture a record-breaking fifth All-Ireland title.

== Match ==
=== Details ===
17 March 2010

Ballyhale Shamrocks	1-19 – 0-17	Portumna
H Shefflin 0-8 (0-6 frees); D Hoyne 1-1; TJ Reid 0-3 (0-1 sideline); E Reid 0-3; J Fitzpatrick 0-2; P Reid, M Aylward, 0-1 each.	(report)	J Canning 0-12 (0-6 frees, 0-1 65); D Hayes 0-2; P Smith, A Smith, M Dolphin, 0-1 each.

Croke Park, Dublin
Referee: Cathal McAllister (Cork)

Ballyhale Shamrocks	Portumna
