= All-Ireland Senior Club Hurling Championship =

Annual inter-county hurling competition

GAA Hurling All-Ireland Senior Club Championship
- Current season or competition: 2026–27 All-Ireland Senior Club Hurling Championship
- Irish: Craobh Shinsear Iomána Chlub na hÉireann
- Code: Hurling
- Founded: 1970–71
- Region: (Republic of Ireland) Ireland (GAA)
- Trophy: Tommy Moore Cup
- No. of teams: 4
- Title holders: Ballygunner (2nd title)
- Most titles: Ballyhale Shamrocks (9 titles)
- Sponsors: Allied Irish Banks
- TV partner: TG4
- Motto: The toughest of them all
- Official website: Official GAA website

The GAA Hurling All-Ireland Senior Club Championship, known simply as the All-Ireland Club Championship or All-Ireland Club SHC, is an annual inter-county hurling competition organised by the Gaelic Athletic Association (GAA). It is the highest inter-county club hurling competition in Ireland, and has been contested every year since the 1970–71 championship (except for 2020–21, due to the COVID-19 pandemic).

The final, currently held on the third Sunday in January, is the culmination of a series of games played between October and February with the winners receiving the Tommy Moore Cup. The All-Ireland Championship has always been played on a straight knockout basis whereby once a team loses they are eliminated from the championship. Currently qualification is limited to teams competing in the Galway Championship, the Leinster Championship, the Munster Championship and the Ulster Championship.

Four teams currently participate in the All-Ireland semi-finals. The most successful teams are from County Galway – seven Galway clubs have won the All-Ireland title on 14 separate occasions.

The title has been won by 26 clubs, 10 of whom have won the title more than once. The all-time record-holders are Ballyhale Shamrocks, who have won the championship on 9 occasions.

Ballygunner of Waterford are the title holders, having defeated Loughrea of Galway by 1-20 to 1-14 in the 2026 final.

== History ==
=== Beginnings ===
Since the foundation of the Gaelic Athletic Association in 1884, challenge, exhibition and tournament matches between clubs on an inter-county level were commonplace. Throughout the 1930s and 1940s, Glen Rovers of Cork and Ahane of Limerick regularly clashed in off-season games. In the 1950s the Cork Churches Tournament came to be recognised as the unofficial All-Ireland Club Championship. The tournament was an initiative by the then Bishop of Cork and Ross, Cornelius Lucey, to raise money to build five new churches in the fast developing suburbs of Cork. Participation was by invitation and was extended to the country’s current best hurling teams. This tournament lasted for five years, however, by the 1960s there was a growing appetite for a similar competition. In 1965 the Munster Council organised the Munster Senior Club Hurling Championship. Following the success of this provincial championship, Donegal, Galway and Wexford put down a motion for the introduction of All-Ireland club championships in both codes at the GAA's Congress in 1969. The motion was successful and the competition eventually began in 1970–71.

=== Team dominance ===
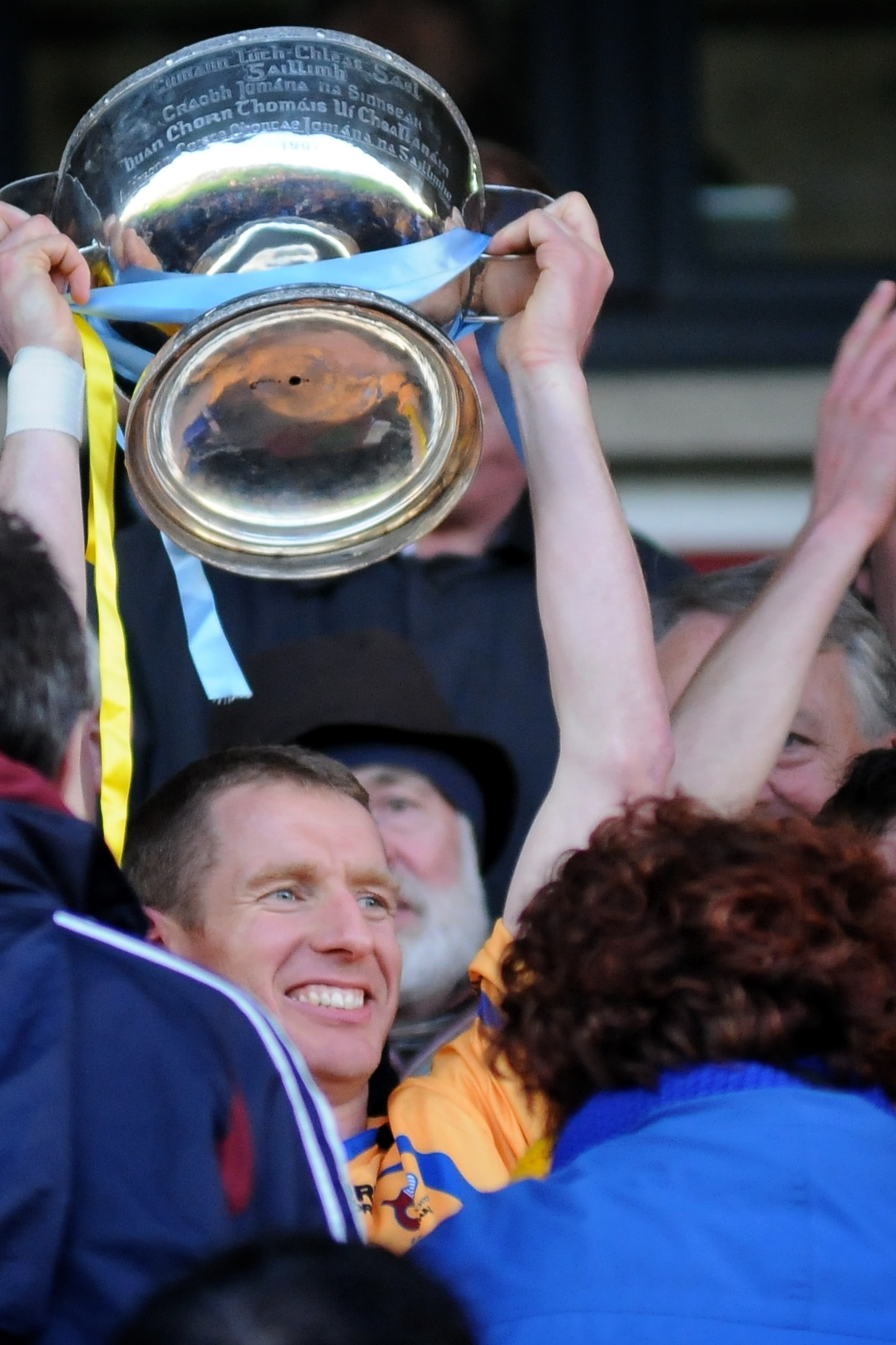
Ollie Canning won four All-Ireland medals with Portumna.

The difficult nature of qualifying for the All-Ireland Championship via the individual county and provincial championships has meant that individual clubs have rarely dominated for prolonged periods of time, however, there have been exceptions.

The first decade of the All-Ireland Championship was dominated by the “big three” clubs from Cork, with Blackrock, Glen Rovers and St. Finbarr’s, Togher sharing every All-Ireland title bar one between 1972 and 1979. Blackrock became the preeminent team of the championship by winning three All-Ireland titles from four final appearances during this time. Glen Rovers and St. Finbarr’s claimed two titles apiece during the same period.

The second decade saw a greater spread of counties represented, with the club champions of Antrim, Cork, Galway, Kilkenny, Tipperary and Wexford all claiming the All-Ireland title. Kilkenny clubs were dominant by winning five championship titles between 1981 and 1991. Ballyhale Shamrocks won three of these titles with victories in 1981, 1984 and 1990.

The resurgence of non-traditional teams at inter-county level was also prevalent in the club championship during the 1990s. Galway clubs came to the fore during this decade, with Sarsfields becoming the first team to retain the All-Ireland title with back-to-back wins in 1993 and 1994. Their success was followed by Athenry who won a lone title in 1997 before claiming back-to-back championships in 2000 and 2001. Clare clubs, buoyed by the inter-county success of the county team, claimed All-Ireland titles in 1996 and 1999.

Offaly club Birr became the most dominant team at the turn of the century. Between 1995 and 2003 the club became the first to win four All-Ireland titles, however, this record was bettered by Ballyhale Shamrocks who won a record-breaking fifth championship in 2010. Portumna of Galway dominated the new century by winning four All-Ireland titles between 2006 and 2014.

=== Competition format history ===
The All-Ireland Championship has always been played as a single elimination tournament whereby once a team loses they are eliminated from the championship. Participation is open to the four champion clubs of the four provinces of Ireland and has largely remained the same since the inaugural championship in 1971, however, there have been some minor changes throughout.

In 1976 the All-Ireland Championship was extended to five clubs as the winners of the London Senior Hurling Championship were allowed to enter. They entered the All-Ireland series at the newly created quarter-final stage and played one of the four provincial champions in rotation. This system lasted until 2004. Since then the London champions have contested the All-Ireland Intermediate Club Hurling Championship.

After several years of being regarded as the most uncompetitive of the four provincial championships, the Connacht Championship was discontinued in 2009. This has meant that the Galway champions represent the province unopposed and gain automatic entry to the All-Ireland semi-final stage.

== Qualification ==
The GAA All-Ireland Senior Club Hurling Championship features four teams in the final tournament. The champions of Leinster, Munster and Ulster and the Galway champions (a team who are unopposed in their own province) qualify for the All-Ireland semi-finals.

Province	Championship	Qualifying Team
Connacht	Galway Senior Hurling Championship	Champions
Leinster	Leinster Senior Club Hurling Championship	Champions
Munster	Munster Senior Club Hurling Championship	Champions
Ulster	Ulster Senior Club Hurling Championship	Champions

== Structure ==
Each of Ireland's 32 counties play their own championship between all the hurling clubs in the county – depending on the county, it can be league, knockout, or a mixture of both. The 32 county champions play in the 4 provincial championships, with the four winners of these advancing to the All-Ireland Semi-Finals. Until the introduction of the Intermediate and Junior Championships one team usually played the London champions in a quarter-final. The London champions now play in the Intermediate Championship. The All-Ireland Final is played in Croke Park in January.

Schedule:

- County championships: June — November
- Provincial championships: October — December
- All-Ireland semi-finals and final: January

== Winning managers ==
Managers in the All-Ireland Club Championship are involved in the day-to-day running of the team, including the training, team selection, and sourcing of players. Their influence varies from club-to-club and is related to the individual club committees. The manager is assisted by a team of two or three selectors and a backroom team consisting of various coaches.

Winning managers
Manager(s)	Team	Wins	Winning years
Pad Joe Whelehan	Birr	3	1998, 2002, 2003
Michael Conneely	Sarsfields	2	1993, 1994
Pat Nally	Athenry	2	2000, 2001
Jimmy Heverin	Portumna	2	2006, 2008
Mattie Kenny	Cuala	2	2017, 2018
Henry Shefflin	Ballyhale Shamrocks	2	2019, 2020
Tom Neville	St Martin's	1	1985
Jim Butler	Buffers Alley	1	1989
Tommy Hearne	Ballyhale Shamrocks	1	1990
Georgie Leahy	Glenmore	1	1991
John Goode	Kiltormer	1	1992
Pádraig Horan	Birr	1	1995
Jim Faul	Sixmilebridge	1	1996
P. J. Molloy	Athenry	1	1997
Michael Clohessy	St. Joseph's, Doora-Barefield	1	1999
Ger Cunningham	Newtownshandrum	1	2004
Adrian Finan	James Stephens	1	2005
Maurice Aylward	Ballyhale Shamrocks	1	2007
Johnny Kelly	Portumna	1	2009
Mick Fennelly; James McGarry	Ballyhale Shamrocks	1	2010
Micheál Donoghue	Clarinbridge	1	2011
P. J. Mullan	Loughgiel Shamrocks	1	2012
John Burke	St. Thomas'	1	2013
Frank Canning	Portumna	1	2014
Andy Moloney	Ballyhale Shamrocks	1	2015
Shane O'Neill	Na Piarsaigh	1	2016
Darragh O'Sullivan	Ballygunner	1	2022
Pat Hoban	Ballyhale Shamrocks	1	2023
Kenneth Burke	St. Thomas'	1	2024

== Provincial and All-Ireland champions by year ==
All-Ireland winners are shaded in gold, and counties are listed in brackets.

Season	Munster Club SHC	Leinster Club SHC	Connacht Club SHC/Galway SHC (Note: From 2008–09 onwards, the Connacht Club SHC was not contested, with the winners of the Galway SHC advancing straight to the All-Ireland semi-finals.)	Ulster Club SHC
1970–71	Roscrea (Tipperary)	St. Rynagh's, Banagher (Offaly)	Liam Mellows (Galway)	Loughgiel Shamrocks (Antrim)
1971–72	Blackrock (Cork)	St. Anne's, Rathnure (Wexford)	Tommy Larkin's (Galway)	Loughgiel Shamrocks (Antrim)
1972–73	Glen Rovers (Cork)	St. Rynagh's, Banagher (Offaly)	Castlegar (Galway)	O'Donovan Rossa (Antrim)
1973–74	Blackrock (Cork)	St. Anne's, Rathnure (Wexford)	Castlegar (Galway)	St. John's (Antrim)
1974–75	St. Finbarr's (Cork)	The Fenians (Kilkenny)	Ardrahan (Galway)	Ballycran (Down)
1975–76	Blackrock (Cork)	James Stephens (Kilkenny)	Ardrahan (Galway)	Ballygalget (Down)
1976–77	Glen Rovers (Cork)	Camross (Laois)	Tremane (Roscommon)	Ballycran (Down)
1977–78	St. Finbarr's (Cork)	St. Anne's, Rathnure (Wexford)	Four Roads (Roscommon)	O'Donovan Rossa (Antrim)
1978–79	Blackrock (Cork)	Ballyhale Shamrocks (Kilkenny)	Ardrahan (Galway)	McQuillan Ballycastle (Antrim)
1979–80	Blackrock (Cork)	Crumlin (Dublin)	Castlegar (Galway)	McQuillan Ballycastle (Antrim)
1980–81	St. Finbarr's (Cork)	Ballyhale Shamrocks (Kilkenny)	Sarsfields (Galway)	McQuillan Ballycastle (Antrim)
1981–82	Mount Sion (Waterford)	James Stephens (Kilkenny)	Gort (Galway)	Ruairí Óg, Cushendall (Antrim)
1982–83	Moycarkey-Borris (Tipperary)	St. Rynagh's, Banagher (Offaly)	Kiltormer (Galway)	Loughgiel Shamrocks (Antrim)
1983–84	Midleton (Cork)	Ballyhale Shamrocks (Kilkenny)	Gort (Galway)	McQuillan Ballycastle (Antrim)
1984–85	Sixmilebridge (Clare)	St Martin's (Kilkenny)	Castlegar (Galway)	McQuillan Ballycastle (Antrim)
1985–86	Kilruane MacDonagh's (Tipperary)	Buffers Alley (Wexford)	Turloughmore (Galway)	Ruairí Óg, Cushendall (Antrim)
1986–87	Borris-Ileigh (Tipperary)	St. Anne's, Rathnure (Wexford)	Killimordaly (Galway)	McQuillan Ballycastle (Antrim)
1987–88	Midleton (Cork)	St. Anne's, Rathnure (Wexford)	Athenry (Galway)	Ruairí Óg, Cushendall (Antrim)
1988–89	Patrickswell (Limerick)	Buffers Alley (Wexford)	Four Roads (Roscommon)	O'Donovan Rossa (Antrim)
1989–90	Ballybrown (Limerick)	Ballyhale Shamrocks (Kilkenny)	Sarsfields (Galway)	Loughgiel Shamrocks (Antrim)
1990–91	Patrickswell (Limerick)	Glenmore (Kilkenny)	Kiltormer (Galway)	Dunloy (Antrim)
1991–92	Cashel King Cormacs (Tipperary)	Birr (Offaly)	Kiltormer (Galway)	Ruairí Óg, Cushendall (Antrim)
1992–93	Kilmallock (Limerick)	Buffers Alley (Wexford)	Sarsfields (Galway)	Ruairí Óg, Cushendall (Antrim)
1993–94	Toomevara (Tipperary)	St. Rynagh's, Banagher (Offaly)	Sarsfields (Galway)	Ballycran (Down)
1994–95	Kilmallock (Limerick)	Birr (Offaly)	Athenry (Galway)	Dunloy (Antrim)
1995–96	Sixmilebridge (Clare)	Glenmore (Kilkenny)	Sarsfields (Galway)	Dunloy (Antrim)
1996–97	Wolfe Tones, Shannon (Clare)	Camross (Laois)	Athenry (Galway)	Ruairí Óg, Cushendall (Antrim)
1997–98	Clarecastle (Clare)	Birr (Offaly)	Sarsfields (Galway)	Dunloy (Antrim)
1998–99	St. Joseph's, Doora-Barefield (Clare)	St. Anne's, Rathnure (Wexford)	Athenry (Galway)	Ballygalget (Down)
1999–2000	St. Joseph's, Doora-Barefield (Clare)	Birr (Offaly)	Athenry (Galway)	Ruairí Óg, Cushendall (Antrim)
2000–01	Sixmilebridge (Clare)	Graigue-Ballycallan (Kilkenny)	Athenry (Galway)	Dunloy (Antrim)
2001–02	Ballygunner (Waterford)	Birr (Offaly)	Clarinbridge (Galway)	Dunloy (Antrim)
2002–03	Mount Sion (Waterford)	Birr (Offaly)	Athenry (Galway)	Dunloy (Antrim)
2003–04	Newtownshandrum (Cork)	O'Loughlin Gaels (Kilkenny)	Portumna (Galway)	Dunloy (Antrim)
2004–05	Toomevara (Tipperary)	James Stephens (Kilkenny)	Athenry (Galway)	O'Donovan Rossa (Antrim)
2005–06	Newtownshandrum (Cork)	James Stephens (Kilkenny)	Portumna (Galway)	Ballygalget (Down)
2006–07	Toomevara (Tipperary)	Ballyhale Shamrocks (Kilkenny)	Loughrea (Galway)	Ruairí Óg, Cushendall (Antrim)
2007–08	Loughmore-Castleiney (Tipperary)	Birr (Offaly)	Portumna (Galway)	Dunloy (Antrim)
2008–09	De La Salle (Waterford)	Ballyhale Shamrocks (Kilkenny)	Portumna	Ruairí Óg, Cushendall (Antrim)
2009–10	Newtownshandrum (Cork)	Ballyhale Shamrocks (Kilkenny)	Portumna	Dunloy (Antrim)
2010–11	De La Salle (Waterford)	O'Loughlin Gaels (Kilkenny)	Clarinbridge	Loughgiel Shamrocks (Antrim)
2011–12	Na Piarsaigh (Limerick)	Coolderry (Offaly)	Gort	Loughgiel Shamrocks (Antrim)
2012–13	Thurles Sarsfields (Tipperary)	Kilcormac-Killoughey (Offaly)	St. Thomas'	Loughgiel Shamrocks (Antrim)
2013–14	Na Piarsaigh (Limerick)	Mount Leinster Rangers (Carlow)	Portumna	Loughgiel Shamrocks (Antrim)
2014–15	Kilmallock (Limerick)	Ballyhale Shamrocks (Kilkenny)	Gort	Portaferry (Down)
2015–16	Na Piarsaigh (Limerick)	Oulart the Ballagh (Wexford)	Sarsfields	Ruairí Óg, Cushendall (Antrim)
2016–17	Ballyea (Clare)	Cuala (Dublin)	St. Thomas'	Slaughtneil (Derry)
2017–18	Na Piarsaigh (Limerick)	Cuala (Dublin)	Liam Mellows	Slaughtneil (Derry)
2018–19	Ballygunner (Waterford)	Ballyhale Shamrocks (Kilkenny)	St. Thomas'	Ruairí Óg, Cushendall (Antrim)
2019–20	Borris-Ileigh (Tipperary)	Ballyhale Shamrocks (Kilkenny)	St. Thomas'	Slaughtneil (Derry)
2020–21	Cancelled due to the COVID-19 pandemic			
2021–22	Ballygunner (Waterford)	Ballyhale Shamrocks (Kilkenny)	St. Thomas'	Slaughtneil (Derry)
2022–23	Ballygunner (Waterford)	Ballyhale Shamrocks (Kilkenny)	St. Thomas'	Dunloy (Antrim)
2023–24	Ballygunner (Waterford)	O'Loughlin Gaels (Kilkenny)	St. Thomas'	Ruairí Óg, Cushendall (Antrim)
2024–25	Sarsfields (Cork)	Na Fianna (Dublin)	Loughrea	Slaughtneil (Derry)
2025–26	Ballygunner (Waterford)	St Martins (Wexford)	Loughrea	Slaughtneil (Derry)
2026–27	Ballygunner / Thurles Sarsfields	4 clubs left in competition	Loughrea	Portaferry / Slaughtneil

== List of finals ==
Year	Winners			Runners-Up			
Year	County	Club	Score	County	Club	Score	Referee
2025–26	WAT	Ballygunner	1-20	GAL	Loughrea	1-14	Chris Mooney
2024–25	DUB	Na Fianna	2–23	COR	Sarsfields	0–20	Liam Gordon
2023–24	GAL	St. Thomas'	0–18	KIL	O'Loughlin Gaels	0–17	Sean Stack
2022–23	KIL	Ballyhale Shamrocks	1–22	ANT	Dunloy	1–15	Johnny Murphy
2021–22	WAT	Ballygunner	2–17	KIL	Ballyhale Shamrocks	1–19	James Owens
2020–21	Cancelled due to the impact of the COVID-19 pandemic on Gaelic games						
2019–20	KIL	Ballyhale Shamrocks	0–18	TIP	Borris-Ileigh	0–15	Colm Lyons
2018–19	KIL	Ballyhale Shamrocks	2–28	GAL	St. Thomas'	2–11	Fergal Horgan
2017–18	DUB	Cuala	1–22; 2–17	LIM	Na Piarsaigh	2–19; 1–17	Colm Lyons & Paud O’Dwyer (Replay)
2016–17	DUB	Cuala	2–19	CLA	Ballyea	1–10	Fergal Horgan
2015–16	LIM	Na Piarsaigh	2–25	ANT	Ruairí Óg, Cushendall	2–14	Diarmuid Kirwan
2014–15	KIL	Ballyhale Shamrocks	1–18	LIM	Kilmallock	1–6	James Owens
2013–14	GAL	Portumna	0–19	CAR	Mount Leinster Rangers	0–11	Barry Kelly
2012–13	GAL	St. Thomas'	1–11	OFF	Kilcormac-Killoughey	1–9	John Sexton
2011–12	ANT	Loughgiel Shamrocks	4–13	OFF	Coolderry	0–17	Alan Kelly
2010–11	GAL	Clarinbridge	2–18	KIL	O'Loughlin Gaels	0–12	Johnny Ryan
2009–10	KIL	Ballyhale Shamrocks	1–19	GAL	Portumna	0–17	Cathal McAllister
2008–09	GAL	Portumna	2–24	WAT	De La Salle	1–8	James McGrath
2007–08	GAL	Portumna	3–19	OFF	Birr	3–9	John Sexton
2006–07	KIL	Ballyhale Shamrocks	3–12	GAL	Loughrea	2–8	Diarmuid Kirwan
2005–06	GAL	Portumna	2–8	COR	Newtownshandrum	1–6	Brian Gavin
2004–05	KIL	James Stephens	0–19	GAL	Athenry	0–14	Seamus Roche
2003–04	COR	Newtownshandrum	0–17	ANT	Dunloy	1–6	Barry Kelly
2002–03	OFF	Birr	1–19	ANT	Dunloy	0–11	Sean McMahon
2001–02	OFF	Birr	2–10	GAL	Clarinbridge	1–5	Ger Harrington
2000–01	GAL	Athenry	3–24	KIL	Graigue-Ballycallan	2–19	Johnny McDonnell
1999–2000	GAL	Athenry	0–16	CLA	St. Joseph's, Doora-Barefield	0–12	Michael Wadding
1998–99	CLA	St. Joseph's, Doora-Barefield	2–14	WEX	St. Anne's, Rathnure	0–8	Pat O’Connor
1997–98	OFF	Birr	1–13	GAL	Sarsfields	0–9	Willie Barrett
1996–97	GAL	Athenry	0–14	CLA	Wolfe Tones, Shannon	1–8	Dickie Murphy
1995–96	CLA	Sixmilebridge	5–10	ANT	Dunloy	2–6	Dickie Murphy
1994–95	OFF	Birr	0–9; 3–13	ANT	Dunloy	0–9; 2–3	Pat O’Connor & Pat O’Connor (Replay)
1993–94	GAL	Sarsfields	1–14	TIP	Toomevara	3–6	Pat Horan
1992–93	GAL	Sarsfields	1–17	LIM	Kilmallock	2–7	Pat Horan
1991–92	GAL	Kiltormer	0–15	OFF	Birr	1–8	Dickie Murphy
1990–91	KIL	Glenmore	1–13	LIM	Patrickswell	0–12	Willie Barrett
1989–90	KIL	Ballyhale Shamrocks	1–16	LIM	Ballybrown	0–16	Willie Horgan
1988–89	WEX	Buffers Alley	2–12	ANT	O'Donovan Rossa	0–12	Willie Horgan
1987–88	Cork	Midleton	3–8	GAL	Athenry	0–9	Gerry Kirwan
1986–87	TIP	Borris-Ileigh	2–9	WEX	St. Anne's, Rathnure	0–9	Gerry Kirwan
1985–86	TIP	Kilruane MacDonaghs	1–15	WEX	Buffers Alley	2–10	Terence Murray
1984–85	KIL	St Martins	2–9; 1–13	GAL	Castlegar	3–6; 1–10	George Ryan & George Ryan (Replay)
1983–84	KIL	Ballyhale Shamrocks	1–10; 1–10	GAL	Gort	1–10; 0–7	George Ryan & George Ryan (Replay)
1982–83	ANT	Loughgiel	1–8; 2–12	OFF	St. Rynagh's, Banagher	2–5; 1–12	Noel O’Donoghue & Jimmy Rankins (Replay)
1981–82	KIL	James Stephens	3–13	WAT	Mount Sion	3–8	George Ryan
1980–81	KIL	Ballyhale Shamrocks	1–15	COR	St Finbarr's	1–11	Noel O’Donoghue
1979–80	GAL	Castlegar	1–11	ANT	McQuillan Ballycastle	1–8	Nealie Duggan
1978–79	COR	Blackrock	5–7	KIL	Ballyhale Shamrocks	5–5	
1977–78	COR	St Finbarr's	2–7	WEX	St. Anne's, Rathnure	0–9	
1976–77	COR	Glen Rovers	2–12	LAO	Camross	0–8	
1975–76	KIL	James Stephens	2–10	COR	Blackrock	2–4	
1974–75	COR	St Finbarr's	3–8	KIL	Fenians	1–6	
1973–74	COR	Blackrock	3–8	WEX	St. Anne's, Rathnure	1–9	
1972–73	COR	Glen Rovers	2–18	OFF	St. Rynagh's, Banagher	2–8	
1971–72	COR	Blackrock	5–13	WEX	St. Anne's, Rathnure	6–9	
1970–71	TIP	Roscrea	4–5	OFF	St. Rynagh's, Banagher	2–5	

== Roll of honour ==
=== By club ===
Club	County	Titles	Runners-up	Years won	Years runners-up
Ballyhale Shamrocks	Kilkenny	9	2	1981, 1984, 1990, 2007, 2010, 2015, 2019, 2020, 2023	1979, 2022
Birr	Offaly	4	2	1995, 1998, 2002, 2003	1992, 2008
Portumna	Galway	4	1	2006, 2008, 2009, 2014	2010
Athenry	Galway	3	2	1997, 2000, 2001	1988, 2005
Blackrock	Cork	3	1	1972, 1974, 1979	1976
James Stephens	Kilkenny	3	0	1976, 1982, 2005	
St. Finbarr's	Cork	2	1	1975, 1978	1981
Sarsfields	Galway	2	1	1993, 1994	1998
St. Thomas'	Galway	2	1	2013, 2024	2019
Glen Rovers	Cork	2	0	1973, 1977	
Loughgiel Shamrocks	Antrim	2	0	1983, 2012	
Cuala	Dublin	2	0	2017, 2018	
Ballygunner	Waterford	2	0	2022, 2026	
Castlegar	Galway	1	1	1980	1985
Borris-Ileigh	Tipperary	1	1	1987	2020
Buffers Alley	Wexford	1	1	1989	1986
St. Joseph's Doora-Barefield	Clare	1	1	1999	2000
Newtownshandrum	Cork	1	1	2004	2006
Clarinbridge	Galway	1	1	2011	2002
Na Piarsaigh	Limerick	1	1	2016	2018
Roscrea	Tipperary	1	0	1971	
St. Martin's	Kilkenny	1	0	1985	
Kilruane MacDonaghs	Tipperary	1	0	1986	
Midleton	Cork	1	0	1988	
Glenmore	Kilkenny	1	0	1991	
Kiltormer	Galway	1	0	1992	
Sixmilebridge	Clare	1	0	1996	
Na Fianna	Dublin	1	0	2025	
Rathnure St Anne’s	Wexford	0	5		1972, 1974, 1978, 1987, 1999
Dunloy	Antrim	0	5		1995, 1996, 2003, 2004, 2023
St. Rynagh's	Offaly	0	3		1971, 1973, 1983
Kilmallock	Limerick	0	2		1993, 2015
O'Loughlin Gaels	Kilkenny	0	2		2011, 2024
Loughrea	Galway	0	2		2007, 2026
Fenians	Kilkenny	0	1		1975
Camross	Laois	0	1		1977
McQuillan Ballycastle	Antrim	0	1		1980
Mount Sion	Waterford	0	1		1982
Gort	Galway	0	1		1984
O'Donovan Rossa	Antrim	0	1		1989
Ballybrown	Limerick	0	1		1990
Patrickswell	Limerick	0	1		1991
Toomevara	Tipperary	0	1		1994
Wolfe Tones na Sionna	Clare	0	1		1997
Graigue-Ballycallan	Kilkenny	0	1		2001
De La Salle	Waterford	0	1		2009
Coolderry	Offaly	0	1		2012
Kilcormac-Killoughey	Offaly	0	1		2013
Mount Leinster Rangers	Carlow	0	1		2014
Ruairí Óg Cushendall	Antrim	0	1		2016
Ballyea	Clare	0	1		2017
Sarsfields	Cork	0	1		2025

=== By county ===
County	Titles	Runners-up	Total
Galway	14	10	24
Kilkenny	14	6	20
Cork	9	4	13
Offaly	4	7	11
Tipperary	3	2	5
Dublin	3	0	3
Antrim	2	8	10
Clare	2	3	5
Waterford	2	2	4
Wexford	1	6	7
Limerick	1	5	6
Laois	0	1	1
Carlow	0	1	1

=== By province ===
Province	Titles	Runners-up	Total
Leinster	22	21	43
Munster	17	16	33
Connacht	14	10	24
Ulster	2	8	10

== Top scorers ==
=== All time ===
As of match played 22 January, 2023.

Rank	Player	Club	Tally	Total
1	T. J. Reid	Ballyhale Shamrocks	14–212	254
2	Gary Kirby	Patrickswell	12–137	173
3	Gregory O'Kane	Dunloy	4–158	170
4	Paul Flynn	Ballygunner	13–119	158
5	Eugene Cloonan	Athenry	14–114	156

=== Cumulative finals ===
Rank	Player	Club	Tally	Total	Finals	Average
1	Joe Canning	Portumna	1–47	50	5	10.00
2	T. J. Reid	Ballyhale Shamrocks	2–43	49	7	7.00
3	Eugene Cloonan	Athenry	1–35	38	4	9.50
4	David Treacy	Cuala	0–30	30	3	10.00
5	Pat Moylan	Blackrock	2–22	28	4	7.00
6	Dan Quigley	St. Anne's, Rathnure	5–12	27	3	9.00
7	Colin Fennelly	Ballyhale Shamrocks	3–13	22	6	3.66
7	Simon Whelehan	Birr	1–19	22	4	5.50
8	Aidan Donohue	Sarsfields	0–21	21	3	7.00
9	Ger Fennelly	Ballyhale Shamrocks	2–13	19	4	4.75

=== Single Final ===
Rank	Player	Club	Tally	Total	Opposition	Year
1	Liam Watson	Loughgiel Shamrocks	3–7	16	Coolderry	2012
2	Dan Quigley	St. Anne's, Rathnure	3–6	15	Blackrock	1974
3	Eugene Cloonan	Athenry	1–11	14	Graigue-Ballycallan	2001
4	Adrian Ronan	Graigue-Ballycallan	1–9	12	Athenry	2001
4	Tom Buckley	Glen Rovers	1–9	12	St. Rynagh's, Banagher	1973
4	David Treacy	Cuala	0–12	12	Na Piarsaigh	2018
4	Joe Canning	Portumna	0–12	12	Ballyhale Shamrocks	2010
5	Brendan Fennelly	Ballyhale Shamrocks	0–11	11	St. Finbarr's, Togher	1981
6	John Rothwell	Blackrock	3–1	10	St. Anne's, Rathnure	1972
6	Dan Quigley	St. Anne's, Rathnure	2–4	10	Blackrock	1972
6	Neil McManus	Ruairí Óg, Cushendall	1–7	10	Na Piarsaigh	2016
6	Mark Kerins	Clarinbridge	1–7	10	O'Loughlin Gaels	2011
6	Simon Whelehan	Birr	1–7	10	Portumna	2008
6	Joe Canning	Portumna	0–10	10	Mount Leinster Rangers	2014
6	Billy Walton	James Stephens	0–10	10	Mount Sion	1982
6	Ben O'Connor	Newtownshandrum	0–10	10	Dunloy	2004
6	Joe Canning	Portumna	0–10	10	Birr	2008

== Records and statistics ==
=== Finals ===
==== Teams ====
- Most wins: 9
  - Ballyhale Shamrocks: (1981, 1984, 1990, 2007, 2010, 2015, 2019, 2020, 2023)
- Most consecutive wins: 2
  - Sarsfields (1993, 1994)
  - Athenry (2000, 2001)
  - Ballyhale Shamrocks (2019, 2020)
  - Birr (2002, 2003)
  - Cuala (2017, 2018)
  - Portumna (2008, 2009)
- Most final appearances: 11
  - Ballyhale Shamrocks (1979, 1981, 1984, 1990, 2007, 2010, 2015, 2019, 2020, 2022, 2023)
- Most final appearances without Winning: 5
  - St. Anne's, Rathnure (1972, 1974, 1978, 1987, 1999)
  - Dunloy (1995, 1996, 2004, 2005, 2023)
- Most Final Appearances Without Losing: 8
  - Ballyhale Shamrocks (1981, 1984, 1990, 2007, 2010, 2015, 2019, 2020)

=== Teams ===
==== By decade ====
Most Successful Team of Each Decade:

- 1970s: Three titles for Blackrock (1972, 1974, 1979)
- 1980s: Two titles for Ballyhale Shamrocks (1981, 1984)
- 1990s: Two titles each for Birr (1995, 1998), and Sarsfields (1993, 1994)
- 2000s: Three titles for Portumna (2006, 2008, 2009)
- 2010s: Three titles for Ballyhale Shamrocks (2010, 2015, 2019)
- 2020s: Two titles each for Ballyhale Shamrocks (2020, 2023), and Ballygunner (2022, 2026)

==== Longest gaps ====
Longest Gaps Between Successive Titles:

- 29 years: Loughgiel Shamrocks (1983–2012)
- 23 years: James Stephens (1982–2005)
- 17 years: Ballyhale Shamrocks (1990–2007)

=== Clubs ===
County	Performances	
County	Winners	Runners-up
Galway	14 titles: Portumna (4), Athenry (3), Sarsfields (2), St. Thomas' (2), Castlegar (1), Clarinbridge (1), Kiltormer (1)	9 times: Athenry (2), Portumna (1), Sarsfields (1), Castlegar (1), Clarinbridge (1), Gort (1), Loughrea (1), St. Thomas' (1)
Kilkenny	14 titles: Ballyhale Shamrocks (9), James Stephens (3), St. Martin's (1), Glenmore (1)	6 times: Ballyhale Shamrocks (2), O'Loughlin Gaels (2), Fenians (1), Graigue-Ballycallan (1)
Cork	9 titles: Blackrock (3), St. Finbarr's, Togher (2), Glen Rovers (2), Midleton (1), Newtownshandrum (1)	4 times: Blackrock (1), St. Finbarr's, Togher (1), Newtownshandrum (1), Sarsfields (1)
Offaly	4 titles: Birr (4)	7 times: St. Rynagh's, Banagher (3), Birr (2), Kilcormac-Killoughey (1), Coolderry (1)
Tipperary	3 titles: Roscrea (1), Kilruane MacDonagh's (1), Borris-Ileigh (1)	2 times: Toomevara (1), Borris-Ileigh (1)
Dublin	3 titles: Cuala (2), Na Fianna (1)	
Antrim	2 titles: Loughgiel Shamrocks (2)	8 times: Dunloy (5), McQuillan's (1), O'Donovan Rossa (1), Ruairí Óg, Cushendall (1)
Clare	2 titles: Sixmilebridge (1), St. Joseph's, Doora-Barefield (1)	3 times: St. Joseph's, Doora-Barefield (1), Wolfe Tones, Shannon (1) Ballyea (1)
Wexford	1 title: Buffers Alley (1)	6 times: St. Anne's, Rathnure (5), Buffers Alley (1)
Limerick	1 title: Na Piarsaigh (1)	5 times: Kilmallock (2), Ballybrown (1), Patrickswell (1), Na Piarsaigh (1)
Waterford	2 titles: Ballygunner (2)	2 times: Mount Sion (1), De La Salle (1)

=== Counties ===
County	Titles	Most recent title
Galway	14	2024
Kilkenny	14	2023
Cork	9	2004
Offaly	4	2003
Tipperary	3	1987
Waterford	2	2026
Antrim	2	2012
Clare	2	1999
Dublin	2	2025
Wexford	1	1989
Limerick	1	2016

== See also ==
- All-Ireland Intermediate Club Hurling Championship
- All-Ireland Junior Club Hurling Championship
- All-Ireland Senior Club Camogie Championship
- All-Ireland Junior B Club Hurling Championship
- All-Ireland Senior Club Football Championship
