= Portumna GAA =

Gaelic sports club in County Galway, Ireland

Portumna
- Port Omna
- Founded: 1888
- County: Galway
- Nickname: Port
- Colours
- Grounds: Marian Park
- Coordinates: 53°05′18.29″N 8°13′00.79″W

Playing kits
Standard colours

Senior Club Championships
	All Ireland	Connacht champions	Galway champions
Hurling:	4	3	6

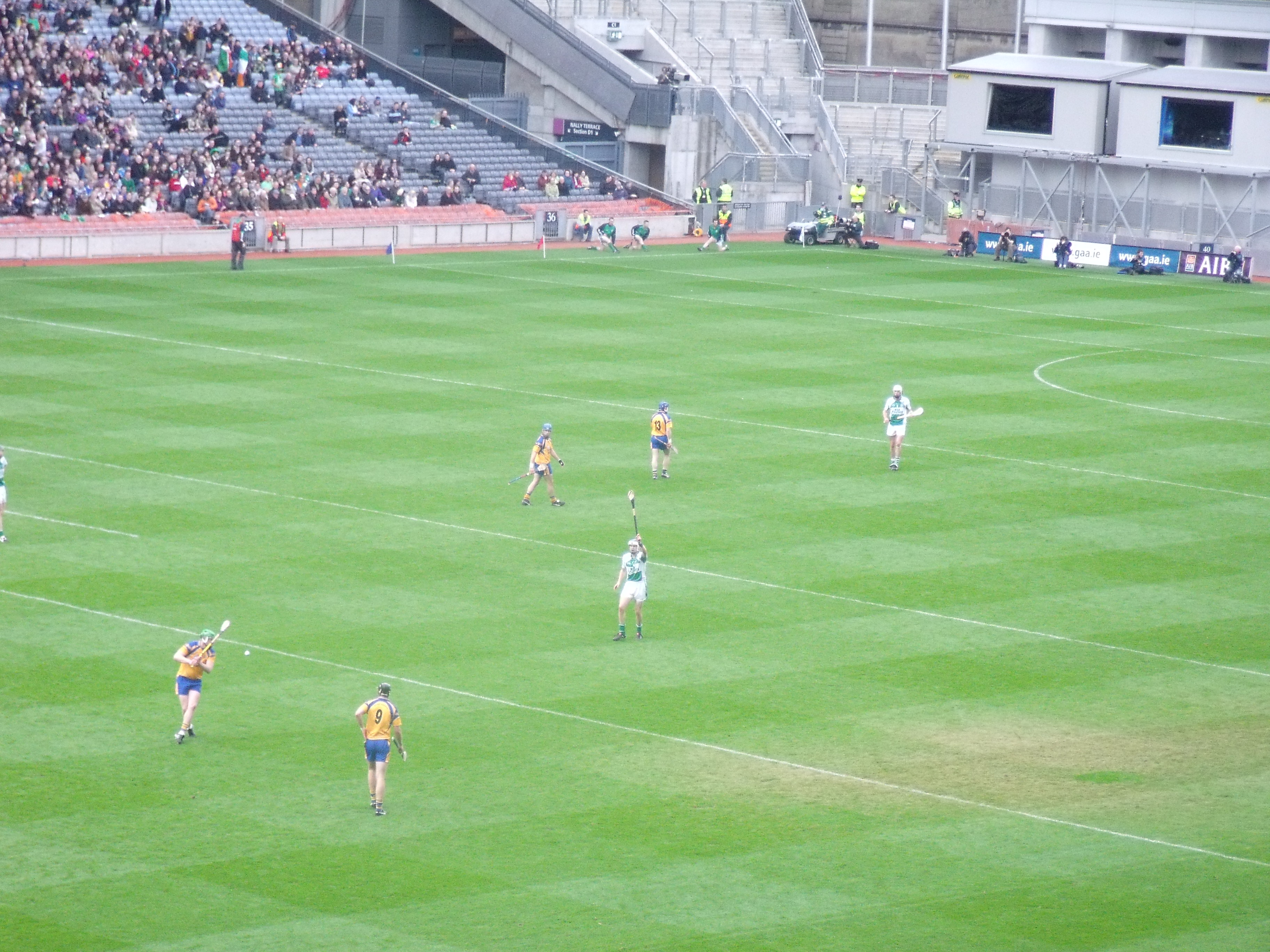
Portumna in the 2010 All-Ireland Club SHC final against Ballyhale Shamrocks.

Portumna GAA is a Gaelic Athletic Association club in Portumna, County Galway, Ireland. The club is affiliated to the Galway County Board and is exclusively concerned with the game of hurling.

== History ==
Located in the town of Portumna, on the Galway-Tipperary border, Portumna GAA Club was established in 1888. The club initially focusses on the game of Gaelic football, with hurling first being played in 1910. Portumna had their first success when, in 1914, the club captured the Galway JHC title.

Portumna won a number of East Board juvenile hurling titles throughout the 1950 and 1960s, before disbanding for a period in the early 1970s but later reforming. The club won their second Galway JHC title in 1982. Ten years later, Portumna secured senior status after claiming the Galway IHC title with a defeat of Kilconieron in a final replay.

Portumna had its most successful era ever in the 10-year period between 2003 and 2013. The club won six Galway SHC titles from eight final appearances during that time. Three Conancht Club SHC titles were also claimed, while Portumna also won four All-Ireland Club SHC, after defeats of Newtownshandrum (2006), Birr (2008), De La Salle (2009) and Mount Leinster Rangers (2014).

== Honours ==
- All-Ireland Senior Club Hurling Championship (4): 2006, 2008, 2009, 2014
- Connacht Senior Club Hurling Championship (3): 2003, 2005, 2007
- Galway Senior Hurling Championship (6): 2003, 2005, 2007, 2008, 2009, 2013
- Galway Intermediate Hurling Championship (1): 1992
- Galway Junior Hurling Championship (2): 1914, 1982
- Galway Minor Hurling Championship (4): 1948, 1990, 1991, 1999

== Notable players ==
- Ollie Canning: All-Ireland MHC-winner (1994)
- Joe Canning: All-Ireland SHC-winner (2017)
- Damien Hayes: Leinster SHC-winner (2012)
