= 2026 Carlow Senior Football Championship =

126th Carlow Senior Football Championship

Tournament details
- County: Carlow
- Province: Leinster
- Year: 2026
- Sponsor: Michael Lyng Motors
- Date: 16 July - 18 October 2026
- Teams: 8
- Defending champions: Old Leighlin

Winners
- Champions: Rathvilly (11th win)
- Manager: Kevin Byrne
- Captain: Colin Byrne

Runners-up
- Runners-up: Old Leighlin
- Manager: Brian Lonergan
- Captain: Aaron Amond

Promotion/Relegation
- Relegated team(s): Fenagh

Other
- Matches played: 26
- Website: Carlow GAA

The 2026 Carlow Senior Football Championship is the 126th edition of the Carlow GAA's premier club Gaelic football tournament for senior graded clubs in County Carlow, Ireland. The tournament consists of 8 teams, with the winner going on to represent Carlow in the Leinster Senior Club Football Championship. The championship starts with a league phase and then progresses to a knock out stage.

Old Leighlin are the defending champions after defeating Rathvilly to win their first Carlow S.F.C title in 12 years.

Grange returned to the senior grade after winning the 2025 Carlow Intermediate Football Championship against Ballon. It ended a gap of 19 years away from the senior level.

Tinryland were relegated after losing to Éire Óg in the 2025 relegation final.

== Format Changes ==
The 2026 Carlow S.F.C starts with a league phase, unlike previous years where it started with a group stage. All 8 clubs with play five games each in the league phase, with the last championship meeting of two clubs last year being avoided for round 1 of the league. The top two clubs advance to semi-finals, while 3rd will play 6th in the quarter-finals, as well as 4th vs 5th. The bottom two clubs will contest in a relegation play-off to save their status as a senior graded club.

Winners of the quarter-finals advance to the semi-finals, where the winners of the semi-finals will play each other to decide who takes the 2026 Carlow S.F.C title.

== Team Changes ==
The following teams have changed division since the 2025 championship season:

=== To S.F.C. ===
Promoted from 2025 Carlow Intermediate Football Championship

- Grange - (Intermediate Champions)

=== From S.F.C. ===
Relegated to 2026 Carlow Intermediate Football Championship

- Tinryland

== Participating teams ==
The clubs competing in the 2026 Carlow SFC are:

Team	Location	Pre C'ship Odds	Championship Position in 2025	Championship Position in 2026	In championship since	Championship titles (Pre 2026)	Last championship title (Pre 2026)
Bagenalstown Gaels	Bagenalstown	9/1	Semi-finals	Quarter-finals	2019	0	—
Éire Óg	Carlow	15/8	Relegation final	Semi-Finalist	—	31	2023
Fenagh	Fenagh	25/1	Quarter-finals	Relegated to 2027 I.F.C.	2025	0	—
Grange	Grange	50/1	Intermediate champions	Quarter-finals	2026	0	—
Mount Leinster Rangers	Borris	14/1	Quarter-finals	Relegation final	—	0	—
Old Leighlin	Old Leighlin	9/2	Champions	Runners-Up	—	5	2025
Palatine	Palatine	10/3	Semi-finals	Semi-finals	—	7	2022
Rathvilly	Rathvilly	13/8	Runners-up	Champions	—	10	2024

== League Phase ==
=== Table ===
Advance to Semi-Finals Advance to Quarter-Finals Advance to relegation play-off

Team	Matches				Score			Pts
Team	Pld	W	D	L	For	Against	Diff	Pts
Éire Óg	5	4	1	0	125	68	+57	9
Rathvilly	5	4	1	0	102	62	+40	9
Palatine	5	3	2	0	94	79	+15	8
Bagenalstowns Gaels	5	2	0	3	94	94	0	4
Old Leighlin	5	2	0	3	66	81	-15	4
Grange	5	2	0	3	77	95	-18	4
Fenagh	5	1	0	4	72	104	-32	2
Mount Leinster Rangers	5	0	0	5	66	113	-47	0

=== Round 1 ===
16 July 2026 Round 1	Bagenalstown Gaels	2-13 (19) – (26) 2-20	Éire Óg	Carlow
19:00 IST (UTC+1)		(HT: 0-08 – 0-11)		Venue: Dr Cullen Park
	Pts: Oisín Dillon 0-6 (1tp, 1tpf), Robbie Kane 1-2, Cian Doyle 0-4 (4f), Niall Bolger 1-0, Patrick McDonnell 0-1	Report	Pts: Ross Dunphy 1-6 (1tp, 1f), Chris Blake 0-6 (2tp, 2'45), Niall Quinlan 0-4 (2f), Diarmuid Ruth 0-2, Kyle Nolan 0-1, Kyle O'Byrne 0-1	Referee: James Foley (Kilbride)

16 July 2026 Round 1	Old Leighlin	1-18 (21) – (10) 0-10	Fenagh	Carlow
20:30 IST (UTC+1)		(HT: 0-10 – 0-05)		Venue: Dr Cullen Park
	Pts: Aaron Amond 1-2, Darragh Fitzgerald 0-3, Mikey Bambrick 0-3, Cathal Coughan 0-3 (1f), James Dowling 0-3, Seamus Kinsella 0-2, Ben Stanley 0-2	Report	Pts: Padaig Hynes 0-3 (1tpf), Ian Craddock 0-3, Cormac Lomax 0-2 (tp)< Jack Treacy 0-1, Ben Collier 0-1	Referee: Brian Deering (Rathvilly)

17 July 2026 Round 1	Rathvilly	2-19 (25) – (11) 0-11	Grange	Carlow
20:30 IST (UTC+1)		(HT: 1-11 – 0-04)		Venue: Dr Cullen Park
	Pts: Kevin Murphy 1-3, Liam Gavin 1-3 (3f), Peter Burgess 0-3, Padhraig Bolger 0-2, Conor Doyle 0-2, Josh Moore 0-1, Colin Byrne 0-1, Eric Molloy 0-1, Dara Curran 0-1, Jake Elliott 0-1, Diarmuid Gavin	Report	Pts: John Murphy 0-4 (1tp, 1f), Henry Hegarty 0-3, Darragh Burrows 0-1, Conor Nolan 0-1, Tadhg Walsh 0-1, Tom Dillon 0-1	Referee: David Hickey (Fenagh)

18 July 2026 Round 1	Palatine	2-19 (25) – (17) 0-17	Mount Leinster Rangers	Carlow
18:00 IST (UTC+1)		(HT: 2-11 – 0-06)		Venue: Dr Cullen Park
	Pts: Mark Buggy 1-6 (2f, 1tp), Jamie Kenny 1-0, Shane O'Neill 0-3 (1f), Josh Egan 0-3, Sam McHugh 0-3 (1tp), Conor Crowley 0-2, Conor Reynolds 0-1, Eoin Ryan 0-1	Report	Pts: Chris Nolan 0-8 (3tp), Dean Tobin 0-4 (2tp), Fiachra Fitzpatrick 0-3 (2f), Donagh Murphy 0-1 (f), Conor Fenlon 0-1	Referee: Seán McCormack (Fighting Cocks)

=== Round 2 ===
23 July 2026 Round 2	Rathvilly	2-16 (22) – (20) 2-14	Bagenalstown Gaels	Carlow
19:30 IST (UTC+1)		(HT: 1-08 – 1-09)		Venue: Dr Cullen Park
	Pts: Liam Gavin 0-7 (3f, 1tp), Conor Doyle 1-3 (1tpf), Darragh Murphy 1-0, Padhraig Bolger 0-3, Dara Curran 0-2, Kevin Murphy 0-1	Report	Pts: Cian Doyle 0-6 (2f, 1tpf), Darragh Nolan 1-0, Jamie Clarke 1-0, Jake Doyle 0-2, Jason Dillon 0-2, Patrick McDonnell 0-1, Oisín Dillon 0-1, Robbie Kane 0-1, Jack McCullagh 0-1	Referee: Marion Hayden (Éire Óg)

24 July 2026 Round 2	Fenagh	2-13 (19) – (21) 3-12	Grange	Carlow
19:00 IST (UTC+1)		(HT: 2-07 – 1-07)		Venue: Dr Cullen Park
	Pts: Padraig Hynes 1-4 (3f), Seán Murphy 0-4 (1tp), Zach O'Hara 1-0, Padraic Kearney 0-2, Jack Treacy 0-1, Cormac Nolan 0-1, Ian Craddock 0-1	Report	Pts: Henry Hegarty 1-5 (1pen, 2'45, 1tp), John Murphy 0-4 (3f), Shane Cormican 1-1, Pat Murphy 1-0, Darragh Burrows 0-1, Aidan Burrows 0-1	Referee: Seán McCormack (Fighting Cocks)

24 July 2026 Round 2	Old Leighlin	1-10 (13) – (15) 0-15	Palatine	Carlow
20:30 IST (UTC+1)		(HT: 1-03 – 0-08)		Venue: Dr Cullen Park
	Pts: Tadhg Roche 1-0, Seamus Kinsella 0-3 (1tpf), James Dowling 0-2, Cathal Coughlan 0-2 (1f), Ian Atkinson 0-1 (m), Darragh Fitzgerald 0-1, Aaron Amond 0-1	Report	Pts: Mark Buggy 0-9 (1tp, 2f), Josh Egan 0-3, Bryan McMahon 0-2 (1f), Conor Crowley 0-1	Referee: Patrick Murphy (Ballinkillen)

25 July 2026 Round 2	Éire Óg	5-15 (30) – (10) 0-10	Mount Leinster Rangers	Carlow
19:30 IST (UTC+1)		(HT: 1-12 – 0-02)		Venue: Dr Cullen Park

=== Round 3 ===
31 July 2026 Round 3	Rathvilly	1-15 (18) – (18) 0-18	Palatine	Carlow
20:30 IST (UTC+1)		(HT: 1-05 – 0-13)		Venue: Dr Cullen Park
	Pts: Kevin Murphy 1-3 (1f), Liam Gavin 0-6 (2f), Peter Burgess 0-2, Conor Doyle 0-2 (tp), Brandon Kelly 0-1, Darragh Murphy 0-1	Report	Pts: Mark Buggy 0-7 (2tpf, 1f), Shane O'Neill 0-3 (1f), Josh Egan 0-2 (tp), Ciarán Moran 0-2 (tp), Tomás Kenny 0-1, Eoin Ryan 0-1, Conor Crowley 0-1, Finbarr Kavanagh 0-1	Referee: David Hickey (Fenagh)

1 August 2026 Round 3	Bagenalstown Gaels	3-12 (21) – (12) 0-12	Grange	Carlow
18:00 IST (UTC+1)		(HT: 1-07 – 0-07)		Venue: Dr Cullen Park
	Pts: Patrick McDonnell 1-3, Jack McCullagh 0-4 (1tp), Cian Doyle 0-3 (2f), James Clarke 1-0, Robbie Kane 1-0, Alan Wall 0-1 (f), Oisín Dillon 0-1	Report	Pts: John Murphy 0-6 (1tp, 3f), Shane Cormican 0-2, Aidan Burrows 0-1, Ned Pender 0-1, Darragh Burrows 0-1, Pat Murphy 0-1	Referee: Brian Deering (Rathvilly)

1 August 2026 Round 3	Old Leighlin	0-09 (9) – (17) 1-14	Éire Óg	Carlow
19:30 IST (UTC+1)		(HT: 0-04 – 1-07)		Venue: Dr Cullen Park
	Pts: James Dowling 0-3, Aaron Amond 0-2 (1tp), Cathal Coughlan 0-2 (1f), Séamus KInsella 0-2 (2f)	Report	Pts: Darragh O'Brien 1-2, Adam McCarron 0-5 (2f, 1'45), Chris Blake 0-3 (1'45), Diarmuid Ruth 0-1, Ross Dunphy 0-1, Colm Hulton 0-1	Referee: James Foley (Kilbride)

2 August 2026 Round 3	Fenagh	1-19 (22) – (12) 1-09	Mount Leinster Rangers	Bagenalstown
16:00 IST (UTC+1)		(HT: 0-09 – 1-06)		Venue: McGrath Park
	Pts: Padraig Hynes 0-10 (3tpf, 1tp), Padraic Kearney 1-1, Ian Craddock 0-3 (1tp), Cormac Lomax 0-1, Jack Kehoe 0-1, Jack Treacy 0-1, Zach O'Hara 0-1, Ciarán Whelan 0-1	Report	Pts: Gary Kelly 1-2, Fiachra Fitzpatrick 0-4 (1tpf, 2f), Donagh Murphy 0-2, Conor Fenlon 0-1	Referee: Lar Murphy (Grange)

=== Round 4 ===
20 August 2026 Round 4	Old Leighlin	0-05 (5) – (22) 0-22	Rathvilly	Carlow
20:30 IST (UTC+1)		(HT: 0-04 – 0-13)		Venue: Dr Cullen Park
	Pts: Seamus Kinsella 0-3 (1f), Cathal Coughlan 0-2 (2f)	Report	Pts: Liam Gavin 0-5 (3f), Brandon Kelly 0-4, Kevin Murphy 0-3, Conor Doyle 0-3, Padhraig Bolger 0-2 (tp), Brendan Murphy 0-1, Darragh Murphy 0-1, Dara Curran 0-1, Ed Finnegan 0-1, Peter Burgess 0-1	Referee: Marion Hayden (Éire Óg)

21 August 2026 Round 4	Éire Óg	6-17 (35) – (13) 1-10	Fenagh	Carlow
19:00 IST (UTC+1)		(HT: 2-10 – 1-03)		Venue: Dr Cullen Park
	Pts: Adam McCarron 3-6 (2f), Chris Blake 1-4 (1tpf), Niall Quinlan 1-1 (f), Ross Dunphy 1-0, Colm Hulton 0-3 (1tp), Diarmuid Ruth 0-1, Kieran Nolan 0-1, Benny Kavanagh 0-1	Report	Pts: Padraig Hynes 0-7 (2tpf, 2f), Jack Treacy 1-0, Seán Murphy 0-1, Zach O'Hara 0-1, Ben Collier 0-1	Referee: James Foley (Kilbride)

21 August 2026 Round 4	Bagenalstown Gaels	0-17 (17) – (16) 0-16	Mount Leinster Rangers	Carlow
20:30 IST (UTC+1)		(HT: 0-08 – 0-08)		Venue: Dr Cullen Park
	Pts: Cian Doyle 0-7 (1tpf, 3f), Jamie Clarke 0-4, Robbie Kane 0-3, Jack Doyle 0-2, Patrick McDonnell 0-1	Report	Pts: Fiachra Fitzpatrick 0-4 (3f), Conaill Fitzpatrick 0-4 (1tpf, 1'45), Jamie Nolan 0-2 (tp), Gary Kelly 0-2, Robert Stafford 0-2 (tp), Patrick Stafford 0-2 (tp)	Referee: David Hickey (Fenagh)

23 August 2026 Round 4	Palatine	1-16 (19) – (14) 0-14	Grange	Carlow
18:30 IST (UTC+1)		(HT: 0-12 – 0-05)		Venue: Dr Cullen Park
	Pts: Shane O'Neill 0-4 (1tpf, 1f), Mark Buggy 0-4 (1tp), Brandon Cassidy 0-3, Josh Egan 1-0, Conor Crowley 0-2, Ciarán Moran 0-2 (tp), Tomás Kenny 0-1	Report	Pts: John Murphy 0-6 (1tp, 2tpf), Paddy Hickey 0-3 (1tp), Aidan Burrows 0-3 (1tp), Darragh Burrows 0-1, Ned Pender 0-1	Referee: David Hickey (Fenagh)

=== Round 5 ===
25 August 2026 Round 5	Rathvilly	1-12 (15) – (8) 0-08	Fenagh	Carlow
20:30 IST (UTC+1)		(HT: 1-08 – 0-05)		Venue: Dr Cullen Park
	Pts: Brandon Kelly 1-3 (1f), Conor Doyle 0-5 (1tp, 1'45), Kevin Murphy 0-1 (f), Padhraig Bolger 0-1, Diarmuid Gavin 0-1 (f), Brian Smith 0-1	Report	Pts: Padraig Hynes 0-4 (3f), Seán Murphy 0-2 (tp), Ben Collier 0-1, Jack Treacy 0-1	Referee: Seán McCormack (Fighting Cocks)

26 August 2026 Round 5	Bagenalstown Gaels	1-14 (17) – (18) 1-15	Old Leighlin	Carlow
20:30 IST (UTC+1)		(HT: 1-07 – 1-07)		Venue: Dr Cullen Park
	Pts: Cian Doyle 1-8 (4f, 1tpf), Oisin Dillon 0-3 (1tp), James Clarke 0-2, Jason Dillon 0-1	Report	Pts: Mikey Bambrick 1-3 (1tp), Aaron Amond 0-4 (1tp), Seamus Kinsella 0-3 (2f), David Bambrick 0-2, James Dowling 0-1, Cathal Coughlan 0-1 (f), Tadhg Roche 0-1	Referee: Patrick Murphy (Ballinkillen)

27 August 2026 Round 5	Mount Leinster Rangers	0-11 (11) – (19) 1-16	Grange	Carlow
19:00 IST (UTC+1)		(HT: 0-05 – 1-09)		Venue: Dr Cullen Park
	Pts: Fiachra Fitzpatrick 0-5 (3f), Jon Nolan 0-2 (tp), Gary Kelly 0-1, Rob Stafford 0-1, Donagh Murphy 0-1, Eoin Doyle 0-1	Report	Pts: John Murphy 0-6 (1tpf, 3f), Pat Murphy 1-1, Henry Hegarty 0-3 (1tp), Darragh Burrows 0-2, Aidan Burrows 0-2, Tadgh Walsh 0-1, Ned Pender 0-1	Referee: Marion Hayden (Éire Óg)

27 August 2026 Round 4	Éire Óg	1-14 (17) – (17) 1-14	Palatine	Carlow
20:30 IST (UTC+1)		(HT: 1-03 – 1-09)		Venue: Dr Cullen Park
	Pts: Adam McCarron 0-5 (1tp, 1tpf), Ross Dunphy 0-4, Kyle O'Byrne 1-0, Colm Hulton 0-3, Eoin Myers 0-1, Adam Nolan 0-1	Report	Pts: Mark Buggy 0-7 (1tpf, 2f), Conor Crowley 0-5 (1tp), Josh Egan 1-2 (tp)	Referee: Jonathan Murphy (St Mullin's)

== Knock-out Stage ==
=== Bracket ===
Quarter-finals
12 September, Carlow
Palatine	3-18
Grange	0-09
13 September, Carlow
Bagenalstown Gaels	0-11
Old Leighlin	1-16

Semi-finals
3 October, Carlow
Palatine	2-16
Rathvilly	4-12
4 October, Carlow
Old Leighlin	1-15
Éire Óg	1-07

Final
18 October, Carlow
Rathvilly	0-14
Old Leighlin	1-08

=== Relegation Play-off ===
9 September 2026 Relegation Play-off	Fenagh	2-10 (16) – (17) 0-17	Mount Leinster Rangers	Carlow
20:30 IST (UTC+1)		(HT: 1-06 – 0-06)		Venue: Dr Cullen Park
				Referee: Seán McCormack (Fighting Cocks)

=== Quarter-Finals ===
12 September 2026 Quarter-Final	Palatine	3-18 (27) – (9) 0-09	Grange	Carlow
19:00 IST (UTC+1)		(HT: 2-11 – 0-03)		Venue: Dr Cullen Park
	Pts: Mark Buggy 2-3 (1tp), Conor Cowley 1-3, Shane O'Neill 0-6 (2tpf), Josh Egan 0-3, Brandon Cassidy 0-2, Fionn O'Toole 0-1 ('45)	Report	Pts: John Murphy 0-7 (5f, 1tpf), Ned Pender 0-1, Paddy Hickey 0-1	Referee: Marion Hayden (Éire Óg)

13 September 2026 Quarter-Final	Bagenalstown Gaels	0-11 (11) – (19) 1-16	Old Leighlin	Carlow
16:00 IST (UTC+1)		(HT: 0-05 – 1-08)		Venue: Dr Cullen Park
	Pts: Cian Doyle 0-5 (3f), Jack McCullagh 0-2 (tp), Robbie Kane 0-1, Danny Doyle 0-1, Patrick McDonnell 0-1, Jamie Clarke 0-1	Report	Pts: Mikey Bambrick 0-7 (3tp), Aaron Amond 0-4 (1tp, 1tpf), James Dowling 1-1, Cathal Coughlan 0-2 (2f), Daniel Brennan 0-1, Tadhg Roche 0-1	Referee: Jonathan Murphy (St Mullin's)

=== Semi-Finals ===
The draw for the semi-finals of the championship took place on 13 September 2026.

3 October 2026 Semi-Final	Rathvilly	4-12 (24) – (22) 2-16	Palatine	Carlow
19:00 IST (UTC+1)		(HT: 2-07 – 1-05)		Venue: Dr Cullen Park
	Pts: Kevin Murphy 0-6 (1f), Liam Gavin 1-2, Brandon Kelly 1-1, Peter Burgess 1-1, Dara Curran 0-1, Conor Doyle 0-1	Report	Pts: Conor Crowley 2-2, Ciarán Moran 0-3 (1tp), Fionn O'Toole 0-2 (tpf), Shane O'Neill 0-2 (2f), Josh Egan 0-2, Bryan McMahon 0-2, Brandon Cassidy 0-1, Mark Buggy 0-1, Finbarr Kavanagh 0-1	Referee: Jonathan Murphy (St Mullin's)

4 October 2026 Semi-Final	Éire Óg	1-07 (10) – (18) 1-15	Old Leighlin	Carlow
15:45 IST (UTC+1)		(HT: 1-04 – 0-05)		Venue: Dr Cullen Park
	Pts: Adam McCarron 0-7 (3f, 1tpf), Eoghan Ruth 1-0	Report	Pts: James Dowling 0-6, Aaron Amond 1-0, Tadhg Roche 0-2, Seamus Kinsella 0-2 (1f), Cathal Coughlan 0-1 (f), Seán Bambrick 0-1, Mikey Bambrick 0-1, Darragh Fitzgerald 0-1, Alan Fitzgerald 0-1 (f)	Referee: David Hickey (Fenagh)

=== Final ===
As a repeat of last years final, both teams were looking to keep or reverse the outcome of last years final.

Rathvilly were looking to win an eleventh senior title and their first since 2024, and Old Leighlin were looking to win their 6th title and second-in-a-row.

Rathvilly were 8/15 favourites, while Old Leighlin were 15/8 underdogs.

18 October 2026
16:00 IST (UTC+1)
Final

Report

Rathvilly	0-14 (14) – (11) 1-08	Old Leighlin
(HT: 0-08 – 1-03)
Pts: Conor Doyle 0-4 (0-1pen), Liam Gavin 0-3 (2f), Brandon Kelly 0-2, Eric Molloy 0-1, Darragh Murphy 0-1, Brendan Murphy 0-1, Brynn Nolan 0-1, Kevin Murphy 0-1		Pts: Seamus Kinsella 0-5 (5f), Cathal Coughlan 1-0, James Dowling 0-3

Dr Cullen Park, Carlow
Referee: James Foley (Kilbride)

Rathvilly	Old Leighlin
