= 2020 Carlow Senior Football Championship =

2020 GAA Football Club Championships

Carlow S.F.C.
- Season: 2020
- Champions: Éire Óg
- Relegated: No Relegation (Covid)
- All Ireland SCFC: ???
- Winning Captain: Sean Gannon
- Man of the Match: Colm Hulton
- Winning Manager: Joe Murphy
- Leinster SCFC: ???
- Matches: 17

The 2020 Carlow Senior Football Championship is the 120th edition of the Carlow GAA's premier club gaelic football tournament for senior graded clubs in County Carlow, Ireland. The tournament consists of 8 teams, with the winner going on to represent Carlow in the Leinster Senior Club Football Championship. The championship starts with a group stage and then progresses to a knock out stage.

Éire Óg were the defending champions after they defeated Palatine in the previous years final.

This was O'Hanrahans return to the senior grade after claiming the 2019 Carlow Intermediate Football Championship title, thus ending a 3-year exodus since being relegated in 2017. There was no Relegation Playoff in 2020 due to COVID-19.

== Team changes ==
The following teams have changed division since the 2018 championship season.

=== To S.F.C. ===
Promoted from 2019 Carlow Intermediate Football Championship

- O'Hanrahans - (Intermediate Champions)

=== From S.F.C. ===
Relegated to 2019 Carlow Intermediate Football Championship

- Ballinabranna

== Group stage ==
There are two groups of four teams. The top two teams in each group compete in the semi-finals. The bottom team in each group compete in the relegation Final.

=== Group A ===
Team	Pld	W	L	D	PF	PA	PD	Pts
Éire Óg	3	3	0	0	45	18	+27	6
Mt. Leinster Rangers	3	2	1	0	32	37	-5	4
O'Hanrahans	3	1	2	0	40	47	-1	2
Bagenalstown Gaels	3	0	3	0	30	45	-15	0

Round 1

- Mount Leinster Rangers 1-13, 2-7 O'Hanrahans, 6/9/2020.
- Éire Óg 1-12, 0-5 Bagenalstown Gaels, 4/9/2020.

Round 2

- Éire Óg 2-7, 0-4 Mount Leinster Rangers, 13/9/2020.
- O'Hanrahans 2-12, 1-11 Bagenalstown Gaels, 13/9/2020.

Round 3

- Mount Leinster Rangers 0-12, 1-8 Bagenalstown Gaels, 20/9/2020.
- Éire Óg 1-14, 0-9 O'Hanrahans, 18/9/2020.

=== Group B ===
Team	Pld	W	L	D	PF	PA	PD	Pts
Rathvilly	3	3	0	0	48	23	+25	6
Palatine	3	2	1	0	47	30	+17	4
Old Leighlin	3	1	2	0	20	32	-12	2
Tinryland	3	0	3	0	21	51	-30	0

Round 1

- Rathvilly 0-15, 1-05 Palatine, 6/9/2020.
- Old Leighlin 0-6, 0-5 Tinryland, 5/9/2020.

Round 2

- Rathvilly 3-12, 0-8 Tinryland, 12/9/2020.
- Palatine 1-12, 0-7 Old Leighlin, 11/9/2020.

Round 3

- Rathvilly 1-9, 1-4 Old Leighlin, 19/9/2020.
- Palatine 5-9, 0-8 Tinryland, 20/9/2020.

== Knock-out stages ==
=== Finals ===
The winners and runners up of each group qualify for the quarter-finals.

Quarter-Finals
Mt. Leinster Rangers	1-9
Old Leighlin	1-5
Palatine	2-11
O'Hanrahans	0-12

Semi-Finals
Rathvilly	0-11
Palatine	0-9
Éire Óg	3-19
Mt. Leinster Rangers	0-8

Final
Rathvilly	0-9
Éire Óg	0-15

=== Quarter-finals ===
9 October 2020; 20:00	Palatine	2-11 - 0-12	O'Hanrahans	Dr Cullen Park
9 October 2020; 20:00	Conor Crowley (1-1), Cathal O’Neill (1-1), Shane O’Neill (0-3, 0-1 f), Andrew Kehoe 0-2, Tomás Kenny (0-2), Jamie Kenny (0-1), David Reid (0-1)		Danny Thompson (0-4, 0-2 f), Mark Davies (0-3), Cian Dowling (0-2), Graham Delaney (0-1), Chris Bermingham (0-1), James McGrath (0-1)	Dr Cullen Park

26 September 2020; 19:00	Mt. Leinster Rangers	1-9 - 1-5	Old Leighlin	Dr Cullen Park
26 September 2020; 19:00	Diarmuid Byrne 0-4 (0-3f), Edward Byrne 0-3, Joe Nolan 0-1, Gary Kelly 0-1, Ted Joyce 0-1, Denis Murphy 0-1, Kevin McDonald 0-1		Cathal Coughlan 1-1 (0-1 f), Seamus Kinsella 0-2 (0-2 f), Mikey Bambrick 0-1, Aaron Amond 0-1	Dr Cullen Park

=== Semi-finals ===
1 August 2021; 19:30	Palatine	1-9 - 1-12	Rathvilly	Dr Cullen Park

1 August 2021; 19:30	Éire Óg	3-19 - 0-8	Mt. Leinster Rangers	Dr Cullen Park

=== Final ===
8 August 2021; 3:45pm	Éire Óg	0-15 - 0-9	Rathvilly	Dr Cullen Park

== Relegation play off ==
There was no relegation playoff in the 2020 Championship due to the impact of the COVID-19 pandemic on Gaelic games.

== Leinster Senior Club Football Championship ==
There was no Leinster Club Championship in 2020 due to the impact of the COVID-19 pandemic on Gaelic games.
