= 2021 Carlow Senior Football Championship =

Football competition

Carlow S.F.C.
- Season: 2021
- Champions: Rathvilly
- Relegated: O'Hanrahans
- All Ireland SCFC: ???
- Winning Captain: Brian Murphy
- Man of the Match: Brian Murphy
- Winning Manager: Pat Ryan
- Leinster SCFC: ???
- Matches: 17

The 2021 Carlow Senior Football Championship was the 121st edition of the Carlow GAA's premier club Gaelic football tournament for senior graded clubs in County Carlow, Ireland. The tournament consisted of eight teams, with the winner going on to represent Carlow in the Leinster Senior Club Football Championship. The championship began with a group stage and then progressed to a knock-out stage.

Éire Óg were the defending champions after they defeated Rathvilly in the previous year's final.

This was Ballinabranna's return to the senior grade after claiming the 2020 Carlow Intermediate Football Championship title, thus ending a two-year exodus since being relegated in 2018. O'Hanrahans were relegated to the 2022 Carlow Intermediate Football Championship.

== Team changes ==
The following teams have changed division since the 2020 championship season.

=== To S.F.C. ===
Promoted from 2020 Carlow Intermediate Football Championship

- Ballinabranna - (Intermediate Champions)

=== From S.F.C. ===
Relegated to 2022 Carlow Intermediate Football Championship

- O'Hanrahans
- There was 9 senior teams in 2021 because no team was relegated in 2020 due to the impact of the COVID-19 pandemic on Gaelic games.

== Group stage ==
There was one group of four teams and one group of five teams in 2021. The top two teams in each group competed in the semi-finals. The bottom team in each group competed in the relegation Final.

=== Group A ===
Team	Pld	W	L	D	PF	PA	PD	Pts
Rathvilly	4	4	0	0	60	35	+25	8
Bagenalstown Gaels	4	3	1	0	60	43	+17	6
Mt. Leinster Rangers	4	2	2	0	44	44	0	4
Old Leighlin	4	1	3	0	47	60	-13	2
Ballinabranna	4	0	4	0	56	75	-19	0

Round 1

- Bagenalstown Gaels 0-5, 0-4 Mount Leinster Rangers, 3/10/2021.
- Rathvilly 1-17, 1-5 Old Leighlin, 3/10/2021.

Round 2

- Rathvilly 2-10, 0-7 Ballinabranna, 10/10/2021.
- Bagenalstown Gaels 1-8, 0-9 Old Leighlin, 10/10/2021.

Round 3

- Rathvilly 1-8, 1-6 Mount Leinster Rangers, 30/09/2021.
- Bagenalstown Gaels 3-14, 2-11 Ballinabranna, 16/10/2021.

Round 4

- Rathvilly 0-13, 1-8 Bagenalstown Gaels, 23/10/2021.
- Old Leighlin 2-12, 1-13 Ballinabranna, 29/09/2021.

Round 5

- Mount Leinster Rangers 2-12, 2-10 Ballinabranna, 24/10/2021.
- Mount Leinster Rangers 1-10, 1-9 Old Leighlin, 3/10/2021.

=== Group B ===
Team	Pld	W	L	D	PF	PA	PD	Pts
Éire Óg	3	3	0	0	76	26	+50	6
Palatine	3	2	1	0	47	41	+6	4
Tinryland	3	1	2	0	31	44	-13	2
O'Hanrahans	3	0	3	0	24	68	-44	0

Round 1

- Eire Og 3-14, 1-08 Palatine, 3/10/2021.
- Tinryland 1-12, 1-4 O'Hanrahan's, 3/10/2021.

Round 2

- Eire Og 6-13, 0-8 O'Hanrahan's, 10/10/2021.
- Palatine 1-11, 0-9 Tinryland, 10/10/2021.

Round 3

- Eire Og 2-17, 0-7 Tinryland, 17/10/2021.
- Palatine 2-16, 0-9 O'Hanrahan's, 17/10/2021.

== Knock-out stages ==
=== Finals ===
The winners and runners up of each group qualify for the quarter finals.

Quarter-Finals
Bagenalstown Gaels	1-9
Tinryland	1-7
Palatine	0-13
Mt. Leinster Rangers	1-7

Semi-Finals
Rathvilly	0-17
Bagenalstown Gaels	1-9
Éire Óg	1-16
Mt. Leinster Rangers	0-9

Final
Rathvilly	2-12
Éire Óg	1-9

=== Quarter-finals ===
Bagenalstown Gaels and Mt. Leinster Rangers advanced to the 2021 semi finals.

31 October 2021; 20:00	Bagenalstown Gaels	1-9 - 1-7	Tinryland	Dr Cullen Park

31 October 2021; 19:00	Mt. Leinster Rangers	1-9 - 1-5	Old Leighlin	Dr Cullen Park

=== Semi-finals ===
Rathvilly and Eire Og advanced to the 2021 final.

7 November 2021; 19:30	Bagenalstown Gaels	1-9 - 0-17	Rathvilly	Dr Cullen Park

7 November 2021; 19:30	Éire Óg	1-16 - 0-9	Mt. Leinster Rangers	Dr Cullen Park

=== Final ===
Rathvilly won a first title since 2014 and prevented finalist Éire Óg from winning five consecutive titles.

14 November 2021; 3:45pm	Éire Óg	1-9 - 2-12	Rathvilly	Dr Cullen Park

== Relegation play-off ==
24 September 2019; 19:00	Ballinabranna	4-07 - 0-13	O'Hanrahan's	Dr Cullen Park

== Leinster Senior Club Football Championship ==
There was no Leinster Club Championship in 2021 due to the impact of the COVID-19 pandemic on Gaelic games.
