= 2016 Carlow Senior Football Championship =

Carlow S.F.C.
- Season: 2016
- Champions: Palatine (6th S.F.C. Title)
- Relegated: Kildavan/Clonegal
- Man of the Match: Shane O'Neill (Palatine)
- Matches: 18

The 2016 Carlow Senior Football Championship is the 116th edition of the Carlow GAA's premier club gaelic football tournament for senior graded clubs in County Carlow, Ireland. The tournament consists of 8 teams, with the winner going on to represent Carlow in the Leinster Senior Club Football Championship. The championship starts with a group stage and then progresses to a knock out stage.

Palatine were the defending champions after they defeated Old Leighlin in the previous years final, and they successfully defended their title when they defeated Rathvilly 2-13 to 0-12 at Dr Cullen Park on 9 October 2016 to claim a "2-in-a-row" of titles.

This was the O'Hanrahans' return to the senior grade after claiming the 2015 Carlow Intermediate Football Championship title, thus ending a 4-year exodus since being relegated in 2011.

Kildavan/Clonegal were relegated to the 2017 I.F.C. after spending 18 seasons in the top flight.

== Team changes ==
The following teams have changed division since the 2015 championship season.

=== To S.F.C. ===
Promoted from I.F.C.

- O'Hanrahans - (Intermediate Champions)

=== From S.F.C. ===
Relegated to I.F.C.

- Ballinabranna

== Group stage ==
There are two groups of four teams. The top two teams in each group compete in the semi-finals. The bottom team in each group compete in the relegation Final.

=== Group A ===
Team	Pld	W	L	D	PF	PA	PD	Pts
Rathvilly	3	2	0	1	54	33	+21	5
Éire Óg	3	2	0	1	69	37	+32	5
Old Leighlin	3	1	2	0	37	44	-7	2
Kildavan/Clonegal	3	0	3	0	16	62	-46	0

Round 1

- Éire Óg 2-18, 0-8 Kildavan/Clonegal, 29/7/2016,
- Rathvilly 1-11, 0-10 Old Leighlin, 30/7/2016,

Round 2

- Old Leighlin 2-11, 0-4 Kildavan/Clonegal, 19/8/2016,
- Rathvilly 0-19, 2-13 Éire Óg, 20/8/2016,

Round 3

- Rathvilly 3-12, 0-4 Kildavan/Clonegal, 9/9/2016,
- Éire Óg 4-14, 0-10 Old Leighlin, 10/9/2016,

=== Group B ===
Team	Pld	W	L	D	PF	PA	PD	Pts
Palatine	3	3	0	0	66	44	+22	6
Tinryland GFC	3	2	1	0	49	45	+4	4
Mt. Leinster Rangers	3	1	2	0	49	50	-1	2
O'Hanrahans	3	0	3	0	41	66	-25	0

Round 1

- Tinryland 2-13, 3-8 Mt. Leinster Rangers, 31/7/2016,
- Palatine 5-13, 3-11 O'Hanrahans, 31/7/2016,

Round 2

- Mt. Leinster Rangers 2-12, 0-12 O'Hanrahans, 20/8/2016,
- Palatine 3-10, 0-10 Tinryland, 21/8/2016,

Round 3

- Tinryland 1-17, 0-9 O'Hanrahans, 11/9/2016,
- Palatine 2-13, 2-8 Mt. Leinster Rangers, 11/9/2016,

== Knock-out stages ==
=== Finals ===
The winners and runners up of each group qualify for the quarter finals.

Quarter-Finals
Éire Óg	1-9
Mt. Leinster Rangers	1-10
Tinryland GFC	1-9
Old Leighlin	1-10

Semi-Finals
Palatine	2-10
Mt. Leinster Rangers	1-11
Rathvilly	0-15
Old Leighlin	1-10

Final
Palatine	2-13
Rathvilly	0-12

Quarter-Finals:

- Mt. Leinster Rangers 1-10, 1-9 Éire Óg, Dr Cullen Park, 17/9/2016,
- Old Leighlin 1-10, 1-9 Tinryland, Dr Cullen Park, 17/9/2016,

Semi-Finals:

- Palatine 2-10, 1-11 Mt. Leinster Rangers, Dr Cullen Park, 24/9/2016,
- Rathvilly 0-15, 1-10 Old Leighlin, Dr Cullen Park, 25/9/2016,
9 October 2016
3:45pm
Final

Palatine	2-13 - 0-12	Rathvilly
Shane O’Neill 0-7 (0-6f), David Reid 1-1, Ciaran Moran 1-0, Craig Kearney (0-1f), Stephen Reilly, Tomás Kenny, Conor Crowley (0-1f), Paul Reid 0-1 each	Report	Gary Dempsey 0-5 (0-3f), Brendan Murphy and Ed Finnegan 0-2 each, Alan Kelly, Ken Doyle, JJ Smith 0-1 each

Dr Cullen Park, Carlow
Referee: David Hickey (Fenagh)

== Relegation play off ==
The bottom team in each group compete in the relegation final. The team to lose will be relegated to the 2017 Senior 'B' Championship.

Relegation Final:

- O'Hanrahans 3-11, 2-6 Kildavan/Clonegal, Dr Cullen Park, 25/9/2016,
