= 2018 Carlow Senior Football Championship =

Carlow S.F.C.
- Season: 2018
- Champions: Éire Óg (28th title)
- Relegated: Kilbride
- All Ireland SCFC: ???
- Winning Captain: Sean Gannon
- Man of the Match: ???
- Winning Manager: Joe Murphy
- Leinster SCFC: ???
- Matches: 18

The 2018 Carlow Senior Football Championship is the 118th edition of the Carlow GAA's premier club gaelic football tournament for senior graded clubs in County Carlow, Ireland. The tournament consists of 8 teams, with the winner going on to represent Carlow in the Leinster Senior Club Football Championship. The championship starts with a group stage and then progresses to a knock out stage.

Éire Óg were the defending champions after they defeated Rathvilly in the previous years final.

This was the Kilbride's return to the senior grade after claiming the 2017 Carlow Intermediate Football Championship title, thus ending a 3-year exodus since being relegated in 2014. However, they were relegated straight back to the 2019 I.F.C. after losing their Relegation Playoff Final at the hands of Old Leighlin.

== Team changes ==
The following teams have changed division since the 2017 championship season.

=== To S.F.C. ===
Promoted from 2017 Carlow Intermediate Football Championship

- Kilbride - (Intermediate Champions)

=== From S.F.C. ===
Relegated to 2018 Carlow Intermediate Football Championship

- O'Hanrahans

== Group stage ==
There are two groups of four teams. The top two teams in each group compete in the semi-finals. The bottom team in each group compete in the relegation Final.

=== Group A ===
Team	Pld	W	L	D	PF	PA	PD	Pts
Éire Óg	3	3	0	0	63	14	+49	6
St Andrew's	3	2	1	0	43	43	+0	4
Mt. Leinster Rangers	3	0	2	1	26	50	-24	1
Kilbride	3	0	2	1	28	53	-25	1

Round 1

- Éire Óg 2-15, 0-3 Mt. Leinster Rangers, 21/7/2018,
- St Andrew's 3-13, 0-9 Kilbride, 22/7/2018,

Round 2

- Éire Óg 0-18, 0-6 Kilbride, 4/8/2018,
- St Andrew's 1-13, 0-10 Mt. Leinster Rangers, 5/8/2018,

Round 3

- Mt. Leinster Rangers 0-13, 1-10 Kilbride, 25/8/2018,
- Éire Óg 4-12, 0-5 St Andrew's, 26/8/2018,

=== Group B ===
Team	Pld	W	L	D	PF	PA	PD	Pts
Palatine	3	2	1	0	53	32	+21	4
Tinryland GFC	3	2	1	0	39	32	+7	4
Rathvilly	3	2	1	0	36	36	+0	4
Old Leighlin	3	0	3	0	23	51	-28	0

Round 1

- Tinryland 3-8, 0-14 Palatine, 21/7/2018,
- Rathvilly 1-11, 1-9 Old Leighlin, 22/7/2018,

Round 2

- Rathvilly 1-7, 0-8 Tinryland, 4/8/2018,
- Palatine 2-17, 0-3 Old Leighlin, 5/8/2018,

Round 3

- Palatine 2-10, 1-9 Rathvilly, 25/8/2018,
- Tinryland 1-11, 1-5 Old Leighlin, 25/8/2018,

== Knock-out stages ==
=== Finals ===
The winners and runners up of each group qualify for the quarter-finals.

Quarter-Finals
St Andrew's	1-12
Rathvilly	2-11
Tinryland GFC	2-7
Mt. Leinster Rangers	3-8

Semi-Finals
Palatine	0-15
Rathvilly	0-9
Éire Óg	0-10
Mt. Leinster Rangers	0-5

Final
Palatine	0-5
Éire Óg	0-9

=== Quarter-finals ===
15 September 2018; 6:00pm	Mt. Leinster Rangers	3-8 - 2-7	Tinryland	Dr Cullen Park

16 September 2018; 6:00pm	Rathvilly	2-11 - 1-12	St Andrew's	Dr Cullen Park

=== Semi-finals ===
22 September 2018; 6:00pm	Éire Óg	0-10 - 0-5	Mt. Leinster Rangers	Dr Cullen Park

23 September 2018; 5:30pm	Palatine	0-15 - 0-9	Rathvilly	Dr Cullen Park

=== Final ===
7 October 2018; 3:45pm	Éire Óg	0-9 - 0-5	Palatine	Dr Cullen Park

== Relegation play off ==
The bottom team in each group compete in the relegation final. The team to lose will be relegated to the 2019 I.F.C.

Relegation Final:

- Old Leighlin 3-6, 0-7 Kilbride, Ballynamire, 22/9/2018,
