= Brendan Murphy (Carlow footballer) =

Irish footballer (born 1989)

Personal information
- Native name: Breandán Ó Murchú (Irish)
- Born: 26 March 1989 (age 37) County Carlow, Ireland
- Height: 1.95 m (6 ft 5 in)

Sport
- Sport: Gaelic Football
- Position: Midfield/Full-forward
Club
- Years: Club
- 2006-: Rathvilly
Club titles
- Carlow titles: 3
Inter-county*
Years	County	Apps (scores)
2010-	Carlow	15 (3-30)
- *Inter County team apps and scores correct as of 31 August 2018 (Championship only).

Brendan Murphy (born 26 March 1989) (Irish: Breandán Ó Murchú) is an Irish sportsman from Rathvilly, County Carlow. He is a member of the Carlow senior football team, and his local club Rathvilly.

== Underage with Carlow ==
Murphy played minor football for Carlow, including on the team that lost the Leinster minor football championship final in 2007. Carlow lost in Round 1 of the championship to Longford, but recovered in the playoffs, causing a shock in beating Meath and Wexford, before beating Westmeath and Louth to reach the final.

For a while, it looked like Murphy might miss the final through suspension after receiving a straight red card in the semi-final against Louth. However, this was overturned on appeal, after video evidence showed that Murphy had been incorrectly disciplined by the referee, and he lined out against Laois in the final at Croke Park.

Carlow trailed by 3-6 to 6 points at half time (all three goals coming from corner forward Conor Meredith), but staged a comeback that included a goal from Jordan Lowry. But spurned chances, including a goal chance for David Kinsella and a missed penalty by Cormac Mullins, saw the comeback fall short, as Laois took yet another minor championship crown on a score of 3-8 to 1-12.

Murphy's performances in the championship led to him being offered a contract with the Sydney Swans AFL team in Australia.

His final game in Carlow before departing for Australia was in the U21 county championship final, which Rathvilly won by 0–5 to 0–2. Murphy scored Rathvilly's fifth point.

== Sydney ==
In early November 2007, Murphy left Ireland and moved to Sydney, Australia to attempt a switch from Gaelic football to Australian rules football. Murphy wrote a column in Carlow newspaper The Nationalist, entitled "Down Under", about his time in Sydney. He made an impressive start in 2007. In March 2009, while playing for the Swans Reserves in the AFL Canberra league, Murphy badly injured his shoulder, requiring surgery, just weeks after being forced out of football by a foot injury.

After two years in Sydney, Murphy decided to turn down the offer of a contract extension to return to Ireland in late 2009 and resume his Gaelic Athletic Association (GAA) career.

Sydney Swans coach Paul Roos expressed the club's disappointment at Murphy's decision, and their hope that he might be persuaded to reconsider a return to the club.

After Murphy's return to his club, Rathvilly defeated Old Leighlin to win the 2009 Carlow Senior Football Championship, their first in five years.

== 2010 ==
In 2010, with most of the 2007 minor panel on board, Carlow had ambitions of winning the Leinster Under 21 Football Championship for the first time ever. Lining out at midfield, Murphy scored a vital goal in extra time in the Preliminary Round to beat Offaly in Tullamore, before Carlow beat Kilkenny in the next round. Murphy scored five points in the game.

Carlow faced Dublin in the semi-final on Saint Patrick's Day. Murphy scored 0-3 from play. However, his Man Of The Match winning performance wasn't enough to beat Dublin, who ran out one point winners in extra time, by 0-14 to 0-13. The game ended in controversial circumstances, when Murphy appeared to be fouled by three Dublin defenders close to goal. However, the referee awarded a free out where a free in would have left Carlow with a point to equalise, and Dublin survived, going on to win the All Ireland.

Murphy was awarded the "Cadbury Hero of the Future" award for March 2010 for his performances against Offaly and Dublin.

Carlow did not fare well in the Leinster SFC Championship, however. While Murphy scored 3 points from midfield, they were well beaten by Wicklow in the preliminary round, before losing by 6 points to Derry, a game Murphy missed after receiving a red card the previous day.

Murphy and Rathvilly returned to the Carlow Senior Football Championship final in October 2010, again facing Old Leighlin. This time, however, the outcome was reversed, with Old Leighlin triumphant. Game one ended level at 0-7 each. Rathvilly looked set for victory, after building up a three-point lead. Murphy kicked three points, but also a couple of wides. A Seamus Kinsella free levelled matters in the dying seconds, to force the tie to a replay the following Sunday.

This presented Murphy with a problem, as he was due to line out for Ireland in the International Rules Series against Australia in the Gaelic Grounds in Limerick the day before the replay. He decided to play both games, but was visibly tired for the county final, and saw a red card in the final few minutes as Old Leighlin prevailed on a scoreline of 1–11 to 0–7.

== 2011 ==
In 2011, Murphy missed almost all of Carlow's NFL Division 4 campaign due to an ankle injury sustained in their second game against Fermanagh. Carlow were ultimately denied promotion on the final day with defeat in a "winner takes all" game in Longford.

In the Leinster SFC quarter final that June, however, Murphy kicked three points (including one directly from a sideline ball) in the final 10 minutes as Carlow shocked Louth in Portlaoise on a scoreline of 0-14 to 0-13. The result sent Carlow into their first Leinster SFC semi final since 1958. Carlow were, however, defeated in the semi-final by a superior Wexford team. Murphy scored two first half points, but Carlow were beaten 4-12 to 0-10 on the day.

Carlow's season ended two weeks later at Casement Park in Belfast when they were beaten by Antrim on a scoreline of 1-13 to 2-9. Despite being reduced to 14 players for the final 20 minutes, Carlow reduced the deficit from five points in the closing stages, thanks in part to a Brendan Murphy goal, and ended up beaten by a single point.

Murphy again missed out on success in the club championship, when Rathvilly were beaten 11 points to 10 by Tinryland in the semi-final.

Murphy was again chosen to represent Ireland in the International Rules series against Australia, and was this time part of Ireland's most successful trip ever "down under". Ireland defeated the Aussies over two legs by 130 points to 65.

== 2012 ==
The 2012 National Football League campaign was a disappointing one for Carlow, when early home defeats to Leitrim and Clare (by 2 and 1 points respectively) put paid to promotion ambitions.

In the Leinster Championship, Murphy was an outstanding performer as Carlow almost caused the shock of the year when they drew 1-12 apiece with Meath in Tullamore. Murphy scored a point from midfield, but it was his running with the ball which caused Meath all sorts of problems. A Carlow side depleted by injury (Daniel St Ledger) and suspension (Derek Hayden and Paul Reid) were beaten in the replay (2-21 to 9 points, Murphy again scoring a point), but ran Laois (who went on to reach the All Ireland quarter final) close in Portlaoise in Round 1 of the qualifiers, eventually losing 1-10 to 9 points. This result precipitated the resignation of Carlow manager Luke Dempsey after a four-year reign.

In the Carlow Senior Football Championship, Rathvilly finished top of Group A, but lost the semi-final to Palatine, who had also beaten them in the 1st round encounter between the two teams. During the game, Murphy was involved in an off-the-ball incident with Palatine midfielder Niall Reid which almost led to Reid being suspended for the final. However, Reid was eventually cleared to line out in Palatine's defeat to Éire Óg.

== 2013 ==
2013 brought with it more disappointment in the National Football League. Under new manager Anthony Rainbow, Carlow won their first game in Thurles against Tipperary, before scraping a home win against London. It was all downhill from there though, as Carlow lost successive games to Leitrim, Limerick, Offaly, Clare and Waterford.

In the Summer, Carlow were beaten 3-15 to 1-10 in Mullingar by Westmeath in the 1st round of the Leinster Football Championship, before exiting the championship altogether against Laois at Dr. Cullen Park. Murphy was deployed at full forward in Mullingar and kicked five points (four from play) but also kicked several wides in a mixed performance.

In what was the first ever All Ireland Football Championship game played on a Friday night, Carlow led Laois at one point by 6 points to 1, with Murphy kicking 3 points. However, Laois gradually began to exert dominance at midfield, with man of the match (and former Minor rival of Murphy's) John O'Loughlin in flying form, and eventually ran out winners by 3-13 to 0-12.

In the Carlow SFC final, Rathvilly once again succumbed to Old Leighlin, this time on a scoreline of 1-10 to 1-8. A slow start was Rathvilly's undoing, as they found themselves 1-4 to no score behind early in the first half, though they fought their way back into the game by half time. Though he did not score, Murphy was to the fore for most of the game. The crucial moment was a point-blank save by Old Leighlin keeper James Clarke in the 52nd minute, where a goal would have given Rathvilly the lead for the first time in the game.

== 2014 ==
Murphy did not involve himself with the Carlow Senior team in 2014. There was much speculation as to the reason, with varying theories suggesting a fallout with manager Rainbow, or the need to avoid injury ahead of deployment abroad with the army. Murphy was sorely missed by the county team, who, after another disappointing league campaign, succumbed to embarrassing defeats against Meath in the Leinster Championship and against a newly resurgent Clare in the qualifiers, though a close win over Waterford in the previous round of the qualifiers provided some solace.

In the club championship, Murphy was deployed in the half back line for Rathvilly, and was often a stand-out player at number 6. In the Carlow SFC final, Rathvilly and Old Leighlin renewed hostilities; this was the fourth time in six years they had met in the decider. And Rathvilly it was who evened up the score at 2-2, defeating their rivals 2-9 to 1-10 in front of an attendance of 3,500. As captain, Murphy had the honour of lifting the trophy, though his involvement was limited by injury (he left the field after 38 minutes) and he failed to register a score.

== 2015 ==
2015 brought a new manager (Carlow native Turlough O'Brien of Éire Óg) and with it new hope of a change in the team's fortunes. Murphy's return to the panel, and the addition of several new players, was a huge boost and Carlow had a decent run of results in the O'Byrne Cup, including victory over Louth, and a near miss against Kildare, losing to a last minute goal. This gave Carlow some momentum to continue into the league.

After four games they sat unbeaten in third position following wins over London (at home) and against Waterford in Dungarvan, as well as draws in Belfast against Antrim and at home to Wicklow. Murphy received black cards in the dying stages of both the game against Waterford and against Wicklow, as he sought to preserve what Carlow held. Despite some positive results, an injury to star forward Paul Broderick in Belfast was to serve as a big blow to both their league and championship ambitions as he did not participate again for the rest of the season.

Carlow travelled to Tullamore on St Patrick's weekend, knowing that their game with Offaly would go a long way to deciding their promotion fate, and that of their hosts. Darragh O'Brien's goal put Carlow in control midway through the second half at 1-9 to 0-9, but Murphy left the field of play (injured) with 15 minutes remaining and his absence was a turning point as Offaly fought their way back and came out on top by 0-14 to 1-10 with a score in injury time. Carlow's promotion hopes were put to bed the following week, following a decisive defeat at the hands of Leitrim. They were defeated again a week later by a Longford team who had just secured promotion.

A few weeks before Carlow's Leinster SFC first round encounter with local rivals Laois, Murphy informed Turlough O'Brien that he was leaving the panel in order to travel to New York City for the summer. As it turned out, he would not have been able to participate anyway as he was injured very shortly afterwards. Missing Murphy and Broderick, Carlow offered little attacking threat against Laois, and the hosts were comprehensively beaten on a score of 3-16 to 0-8. A few weeks later, their interests in the 2015 championship was brought to an end in Longford (2-16 to 1-8).

Despite topping their group, Rathvilly were beaten in the club championship semi final by Old Leighlin.

== 2016 ==
Carlow's 2016 league campaign began with a home defeat to Antrim, but the scallioneaters were given renewed hope with to a 4-4 to 1-11 victory in London, thanks in large part to a Sean Gannon hat-trick. Defeat at home to Waterford by 3-15 to 15 points appeared to spell the end of their promotion chances, but these chances seemed to be reinvigorated by a three-point win in Aughrim the following weekend in a game where Murphy was shown the black card after about 20 minutes. A positive start the following weekend at home to Louth saw Carlow in contention early on, but Louth took over, scoring 2-10 without reply, and ran out easy winners to end Carlow's promotion hopes. Carlow did, however, finish off the campaign in a relatively positive manner, with victory in Carrick-on-Shannon and a defeat away to Wexford, leaving them finishing 4th in Division 4.

The 1st round of the Leinster championship saw Carlow reacquainted with Louth, and this time Carlow stayed with their heavily favoured opponents for much longer than in the league encounter just a couple of months earlier. Timely goals from Chris Blake and Darragh O'Brien kept them in touch, despite Louth's superior firepower, and Brendan Murphy contributed two points from midfield. Carlow were still within 2 points of their opponents after 62 minutes, but Louth finished with a flourish to win 2-24 to 3-11. The score reflected unfairly on Carlow's relatively competitive performance. Paul Broderick scored the third Carlow goal from the penalty spot late in the game.

Carlow drew neighbours Wicklow in the first round of the qualifiers, and came through with a 1-17 to 1-12 win at Dr. Cullen Park. Carlow led from start to finish, and were in front by as much as eight points at one stage. Murphy was a key man in the victory, bursting through the Wicklow defence to score Carlow's goal after 5 minutes, and adding four fine points over the course of the game.

Unfortunately, Murphy picked up a black card in that game: his second of the year. Added to two yellow cards received in the league, this meant Murphy had to sit out the next round game against Cavan at Breffni Park. Carlow were beaten 0-12 to 2-13 by their Division 1 opponents.

In the Carlow club championship, Rathvilly were beaten 2-13 to 0-12 in the county final by a Palatine team that was winning back-to-back Senior Championships for the first time in nearly a century. Rathvilly had topped their group by beating Old Leighlin, drawing with Eire Og, and beating Kildavin/Clonegal. They beat Old Leighlin again in the semi-final by 0-15 to 1-10.

== 2017 ==
The 2017 league season was something of a mixed bag for Carlow. They opened with an exciting draw in Mullingar against Westmeath, with Shane O'Neill scoring a late goal. This promising start to the campaign was undone in week 2, when Carlow were beaten by London at home. London took a huge lead into the break with the help of a wind, and though Carlow closed the gap, they were too wasteful to catch up with the Exiles, eventually losing by five points.

They recovered somewhat two weeks later with a 1-10 to 10 points win over Limerick at home, but another defeat in Carrick-on-Shannon (by 2 points to Leitrim) effectively ended their promotion hopes.

Carlow closed out the campaign with easy wins against Waterford, Wicklow (in Aughrim, notable for a fantastic individual display from Paul Broderick) and Wexford (who fielded a weakened team) to finish in 3rd place, but it was very much a case of "what might have been" had they not dropped 4 points against the two teams they probably thought their most likely source of victories at the beginning of the campaign. Murphy did not play in the final game against Wexford, as he had already received two black cards during the campaign and one more would put him out of the Leinster championship game against the same opponents.

That same history of indiscipline was to rear its head in the championship, though didn't stop Carlow making history. They won three championship games for the first time since 1944, and played football on July 15; the latest date they had played since the "back door" system was instituted in 2001.

Carlow beat Wexford in the first round of the Leinster Championship by 2-17 to 2-13. In truth, Carlow were much the better team, but two soft goals by Naomhan Rossiter and PJ Banville kept the model county in the hunt until Murphy broke away near the end to score a cracking goal. His total that day from midfield was one goal and two points. That win, Carlow's first in the Leinster Championship since 2011, set up a marquee match-up with All Ireland Champions Dublin in Portlaoise. Carlow set out to frustrate their more illustrious opponents, and many observers were shocked to see Carlow still within a score at the break; Dublin leading 0-8 to 0-5. There was still just four points between the teams with 22 minutes remaining when Murphy received his second yellow card after a tussle with Jonny Cooper, and Carlow could only manage one more score, eventually losing 0-19 to 0-7 with Murphy contributing one fine first half point (the first score of the game).

Though his sending off did not result in a suspension, Carlow (successfully) applied to have one of Murphy's yellow cards rescinded, perhaps in anticipation of further cautions in future games resulting in a suspension. This assumption was well founded, as Murphy found himself receiving two more yellow cards (within 60 seconds of each other) in Carlow's 1st round qualifying game against London in Ruislip. This meant that he was suspended for Carlow's 2nd-round game at home to Leitrim, after Carlow came through against the Exiles by a mere point, 0-13 to 0-12. Murphy again contributed one score. In Murphy's absence, Carlow dismissed Leitrim on a scoreline of 2-14 to 0-13, with Paul Broderick and Ciaran Moran providing the goals.

Carlow's historic trip to the 3rd round (their first ever) resulted in a visit to Dr. Cullen Park from Monaghan, who had only missed out on a place in the Division One final of the National League on score difference. It was here that Carlow's championship run ended on a scoreline of 1-12 to 1-7. However, they managed to stay with their much more experienced opposition for most of the game, leading by two points with 15 minutes to play, and were still level with their Division One opponents inside the final ten minutes. Murphy scored two excellent points from play and put in a terrific (and indeed a much more disciplined) shift at right half forward, but Carlow's brave performance was in vain.

In the club championship, Rathvilly suffered yet another county final defeat (their second in a row and the fourth of Murphy's career) when they were beaten by Eire Og, 2-8 to 1-8, in a replay. The loss was particularly disappointing, as Rathvilly had led the first game for much of the 60 minutes, before allowing themselves to be pegged back at the end.

== 2018 ==
After the huge strides made in 2017, Carlow set their sights on promotion from Division 4, with this achievement representing their main goal for 2018. They achieved this on St. Patrick's weekend, thanks to a 1-12 to 0-12 win against Antrim at Corrigan Park in Belfast. It was their first promotion for 35 years.

The win in Belfast was Carlow's sixth from six games, following wins over London (2-14 to 2-9 in Ruislip), Limerick (2-11 to 0-13 in Newcastle West), Leitrim (2-11 to 0-5 in Carlow), Waterford (2-12 to 2-9 in Dungarvan) and Wicklow (1-17 to 0-12 in Carlow).

In what was a dead rubber from Carlow's point of view, they lost to Laois (1-6 to 0-8) at Dr. Cullen Park in their last game of league, before being beaten by the same opposition in the Division 4 final at Croke Park, 0-15 to 0-11.

Despite disappointment in the final two games - for Carlow certainly had enough opportunities for victory in both - they had achieved their primary goal for the season by the middle of March, and Carlow football was on a high as they began preparing for the 1st round of the Leinster Championship, where they would be reacquainted with Louth at O'Moore Park. Carlow would go on to have arguably their most successful Leinster Championship in six decades. They won back-to-back games in Leinster for the first time since 1996 (when they beat Wexford and Wicklow in a preliminary round group), and for only the second time since 1948. What's more, they won them well, dismantling Louth in Portlaoise on a scoreline of 2-17 to 0-12, before beating Kildare for the first time since 1953, 2-14 to 1-10.

However, Murphy was not a part of either win. Shortly after the defeat to Laois at Croke Park he announced that he would be leaving the panel ahead of the Leinster championship campaign to spend the summer in America. He therefore missed Carlow's return to Croke Park to face Laois (again) in the Leinster semi-final, losing by 0-12 to 0-8, before exiting the championship altogether at the hands of eventual All-Ireland finalists Tyrone.

In the Carlow club championship, Rathvilly were eliminated at the semi-final stage by Palatine. They trailed Palatine by 9 points to no score at half-time, and though they closed the gap to 3 points at one stage, Palatine ran out 0-15 to 0-9 winners.

== 2019 ==
2019 was not a successful year for Murphy. Carlow were relegated back to Division 4 win a record of two wins (against Sligo and Louth), 1 draw (against Westmeath) and 4 defeats, including a 3 point loss in Portlaoise in the last game of the season which confirmed their relegation.

Murphy was subsequently missing for Carlow's championship campaign for the second year in a row - this time as a result of a suspension incurred for verbally abusing the referee after a close defeat to Down in Round 6 of the National Football League.

There followed two disappointing championship outings for Carlow. A 2-18 to 0-9 point loss to Meath in Portlaoise, and a 2-11 to 0-7 defeat against Longford in Carlow in the 1st round of the All Ireland Qualifiers.

Murphy's season ended with a disappointing defeat for Rathvilly to Palatine in the semi-final of the Carlow county championship.

Murphy finished as top scorer of the 2019 Carlow Senior Football Championship for Rathvilly with a tally of 3-14 all of which were scored from play, averaging 5.7 points per game.

== 2020 onwards ==
Murphy absented himself from the Carlow panel from the 2020 season onwards, but continued to play club football. Rathvilly reached the Covid-delayed 2020 county final (played in 2021), where they lost 0-15 to 0-9 to an Eire Og team claiming their fourth championship in a row. However, he was a key part of the Rathvilly side that won the 2021 championship. They caused a huge upset in the final, beating Eire Og by 2-12 to 1-10.

== Accolades ==
- 3 Carlow Senior Football Championship
- 1 Minor County Championship
- 2 U21 County Championships
- 2 Seasons on a Rookie Contract with the Sydney Swans
- Leinster Minor Finalist 2007
