= 2017 Carlow Senior Football Championship =

Carlow S.F.C.
- Season: 2017
- Champions: Éire Óg (27th title)
- Relegated: O'Hanrahans
- All Ireland SCFC: ???
- Winning Captain: Sean Gannon
- Man of the Match: Robert Moore
- Winning Manager: Joe Murphy
- Leinster SCFC: ???
- Matches: 18

The 2017 Carlow Senior Football Championship is the 117th edition of the Carlow GAA's premier club gaelic football tournament for senior graded clubs in County Carlow, Ireland. The tournament consists of 8 teams, with the winner going on to represent Carlow in the Leinster Senior Club Football Championship. The championship starts with a group stage and then progresses to a knock out stage.

Palatine were the defending champions after they defeated Rathvilly in the previous years final to claim a "2-in-a-row" of titles, however their chances of a hat-trick of titles was thwarted by Éire Óg at the semi-final stage.

This was the St Andrew's return to the senior grade after claiming the 2016 Carlow Intermediate Football Championship title, thus ending a 3-year exodus since being relegated in 2013.

O'Hanrahans were relegated to the 2018 I.F.C. after just a 2-year stint in the top-flight when losing to Mt. Leinster Rangers in a relegation play off final.

== Team changes ==
The following teams have changed division since the 2016 championship season.

=== To S.F.C. ===
Promoted from 2016 Carlow Intermediate Football Championship

- St Andrew's - (Intermediate Champions)

=== From S.F.C. ===
Relegated to 2017 Carlow Intermediate Football Championship

- Kildavin/Clonegal

== Group stage ==
There are two groups of four teams. The top two teams in each group compete in the semi-finals. The bottom team in each group compete in the relegation Final.

=== Group A ===
Team	Pld	W	L	D	PF	PA	PD	Pts
Palatine	3	3	0	0	68	34	+34	6
Old Leighlin	3	2	1	0	35	35	+0	4
Tinryland GFC	3	1	2	0	42	43	-1	2
Mt. Leinster Rangers	3	0	3	0	23	56	-33	0

Round 1

- Old Leighlin 0-9, 0-8 Mt. Leinster Rangers, 29/7/2017,
- Palatine 2-15, 1-12 Tinryland, 3/8/2017,

Round 2

- Palatine 2-13, 0-13 Old Leighlin, 12/8/2017,
- Tinryland 4-7, 0-9 Mt. Leinster Rangers, 13/8/2017,

Round 3

- Palatine 3-19, 0-6 Mt. Leinster Rangers, 26/8/2017,
- Old Leighlin 1-10, 0-8 Tinryland, 27/8/2017,

=== Group B ===
Team	Pld	W	L	D	PF	PA	PD	Pts
Rathvilly	3	3	0	0	46	38	+8	6
Éire Óg	3	2	1	0	63	33	+30	4
St Andrew's	3	1	2	0	40	47	-7	2
O'Hanrahans	3	0	3	0	32	63	-31	0

Round 1

- Éire Óg 1-20, 0-6 St Andrew's, 28/7/2017,
- Rathvilly 0-16, 0-11 O'Hanrahans, 29/7/2017,

Round 2

- Éire Óg 3-18, 0-12 O'Hanrahans, 11/8/2017,
- Rathvilly 0-15, 1-11 St Andrew's, 13/8/2017,

Round 3

- Rathvilly 0-15, 0-13 Éire Óg, 27/8/2017,
- St Andrew's 1-17, 0-9 O'Hanrahans, 27/8/2017,

== Knock-out stages ==
=== Finals ===
The winners and runners up of each group qualify for the quarter finals.

Quarter-Finals
Éire Óg	0-13
Tinryland GFC	0-7
Old Leighlin	1-8
St. Andrew's	0-8

Semi-Finals
Palatine	1-7
Éire Óg	1-12
Rathvilly	0-12
Old Leighlin	0-10

Final
Éire Óg	0-12 (2-8 R)
Rathvilly	1-9, (1-8 R)

=== Quarter-finals ===
9/16/17	Old Leighlin	1-8 - 0-8	St Andrew's	Dr Cullen Park
9/16/17	Hugh Gahan 1-0, Seamus Kinsella 0-3f, Cathal Coughlan 0-2f, Ger Hickey, Pat Hickey, Aaron Amond 0-1 each		Robbie Kane 0-4 (0-2f), Jamie Clarke 0-2, Alan Beaton and John Doyle 0-1 each	Dr Cullen Park

9/16/17	Éire Óg	0-13 - 0-7	Tinryland GFC	Dr Cullen Park
9/16/17	Niall Quinlan 0-4 (0-3f), Chris Blake 0-3, Kelvin Chatten and Sean Gannon 0-2 each, Darragh O'Brien and Cormac Mullins 0-1 each		Paul Broderick 0-3 (0-2f), Niall Lowry and Diarmaid Walshe 0-2 each	Dr Cullen Park

=== Semi-finals ===
9/24/17	Éire Óg	1-12 - 1-7	Palatine	Dr Cullen Park

9/24/17	Rathvilly	0-12 - 0-10	Old Leighlin	Dr Cullen Park

=== Final ===
8 October 2017; 3:45 pm Final	Éire Óg	0-12 - 1-9	Rathvilly	Dr Cullen Park, Carlow; Referee: David Hughes (Erin's Own Bagenalstown); Man of the Match: Alan Kelly
8 October 2017; 3:45 pm Final	Darragh O'Brien (0-2f) and Eric McCormack (0-3f) 0-3 each, Eoghan Ruth 0-2, Sean Gannon, Derek Hayden, Niall Quinlan (0-1f), Cormac Mullins 0-1 each	Report	Gary Dempsey 1-2 (0-1f), Alan Kelly 0-3, Brian Murphy (0-1f) and JJ Smith 0-2 each	Dr Cullen Park, Carlow; Referee: David Hughes (Erin's Own Bagenalstown); Man of the Match: Alan Kelly

22 October 2017; 3:15 pm Final replay	Éire Óg	2-8 - 1-8	Rathvilly	Dr Cullen Park; Attendance: 2,500; Referee: David Hickey (Fenagh); Man of the Match: Robert Moore
22 October 2017; 3:15 pm Final replay	Jordan Morrissey 1-1, Darragh O'Brien 0-4f, Eoghan Ruth 1-0, Sean Gannon 0-2, Derek Hayden 0-1	Report	Gary Dempsey 1-5 (1-0 pen, 0-4f), Ken Doyle, Danny Molloy, JJ Smith (1 '45) 0-1 each	Dr Cullen Park; Attendance: 2,500; Referee: David Hickey (Fenagh); Man of the Match: Robert Moore

== Relegation play off ==
The bottom team in each group compete in the relegation final. The team to lose will be relegated to the 2018 I.F.C.

Relegation Final:

- Mt. Leinster Rangers 3-9, 3-7 O'Hanrahans, Dr Cullen Park, 16/9/2017,
