= J. J. Smith (Gaelic footballer) =

Irish Gaelic footballer

Personal information
- Born: Carlow, Ireland

Sport
- Sport: Gaelic football
- Position: Midfield
Club
- Years: Club
- 2000s – present: Rathvilly
Club titles
- Carlow titles: 3
- Leinster titles: 0
Inter-county
- Years: County
- 200?–: Carlow
Inter-county titles
- Leinster titles: 0
- All Stars: 0

J. J. Smith is an Irish Gaelic footballer. From Rathvilly, County Carlow, he plays for the Carlow senior football team, and for his local club Rathvilly. He has won 3 Carlow Senior Football Championships with his club—in 2002, 2004 and 2009. He also played with the Carlow IT team during his college days.
