= 2019 Carlow Senior Football Championship =

Carlow S.F.C.
- Season: 2019
- Champions: Éire Óg
- Relegated: Ballinabranna
- All Ireland SCFC: ???
- Winning Captain: Sean Gannon
- Man of the Match: Benny Kavanagh
- Winning Manager: Joe Murphy
- Leinster SCFC: ???
- Matches: 18

The 2019 Carlow Senior Football Championship is the 119th edition of the Carlow GAA's premier club gaelic football tournament for senior graded clubs in County Carlow, Ireland. The tournament consists of 8 teams, with the winner going on to represent Carlow in the Leinster Senior Club Football Championship. The championship starts with a group stage and then progresses to a knock out stage.

Éire Óg were the defending champions after they defeated Rathvilly in the previous years final.

This was Ballinabranna's return to the senior grade after claiming the 2018 Carlow Intermediate Football Championship title, thus ending a 3-year exodus since being relegated in 2016.

== Team changes ==
The following teams have changed division since the 2018 championship season.

=== To S.F.C. ===
Promoted from 2019 Carlow Intermediate Football Championship

- Ballinabranna - (Intermediate Champions)

=== From S.F.C. ===
Relegated to 2019 Carlow Intermediate Football Championship

- O'Hanrahans

== Group stage ==
There are two groups of four teams. The top two teams in each group compete in the semi-finals. The bottom team in each group compete in the relegation Final.

=== Group A ===
Team	Pld	W	L	D	PF	PA	PD	Pts
Éire Óg	3	2	1	0	45	35	+10	4
Tinryland	3	2	1	0	36	32	+4	4
Old Leighlin	3	2	1	0	36	35	-1	4
Ballinabranna	3	0	3	0	37	52	-15	0

Round 1

- Old Leighlin 0-11, 1-7 Tinryland, 25/7/2019.
- Éire Óg 3-15, 1-9 Ballinabranna, 28/7/2019.

Round 2

- Éire Óg 0-11, 0-10 Old Leighlin, 11/8/2019.
- Tinryland 1-10, 0-11 Ballinabranna, 10/8/2019.

Round 3

- Old Leighlin 2-9, 1-11 Ballinabranna, 24/8/2019.
- Tinryland 2-7, 1-7 Éire Óg, 24/8/2019.

=== Group B ===
Team	Pld	W	L	D	PF	PA	PD	Pts
Rathvilly	3	3	0	0	52	37	+15	6
Bagenalstown Gaels	3	2	1	0	47	49	-2	4
Palatine	3	1	2	0	41	38	+3	2
Mt. Leinster Rangers	3	0	3	0	30	48	-18	0

Round 1

- Rathvilly 3-14, 2-12 Bagenalstown Gaels, 26/7/2019.
- Palatine 0-15, 2-5 Mount Leinster Rangers, 26/7/2019.

Round 2

- Rathvilly 1-13, 0-4 Mount Leinster Rangers, 9/8/2019.
- Bagenalstown Gaels 1-09, 0-11 Palatine, 11/8/2019.

Round 3

- Bagenalstown Gaels 3-8, 1-12 Mount Leinster Rangers, 25/8/2019.
- Rathvilly 2-9, 0-15 Palatine, 25/8/2019.

== Knock-out stages ==
=== Finals ===
The winners and runners up of each group qualify for the quarter-finals.

Quarter-Finals
Palatine	1-8
Tinryland	1-7
Bagenalstown Gaels	3-11
Old Leighlin	1-11

Semi-Finals
Palatine	0-11
Rathvilly	0-9
Éire Óg	1-30
Bagenalstown Gaels	0-5

Final
Palatine	0-5
Éire Óg	1-15

=== Quarter-finals ===
13 September 2019; 20:00	Palatine	1-8 - 1-7	Tinryland	Dr Cullen Park
13 September 2019; 20:00	Shane O'Neill 0-6 (0-5 f), Jamie Kenny 1-0, Craig Kearney 0-1 (0-1 f), Andrew Kehoe 0-1		Paul Broderick 0-4 (0-1 f), Shane Redmond 1-0, Diarmuid Walshe 0-1 (0-1 f), Niall Lowry 0-1, Mark Lawlor 0-1	Dr Cullen Park

15 September 2019; 19:00	Bagenalstown Gaels	3-11 - 1-11 (AET)	Old Leighlin	Dr Cullen Park
15 September 2019; 19:00	Robbie Kane 1-2 (0-1 f), Andrew Beaton 1-2, Darren Crooks 1-0, Jamie Clarke 0-3 (0-2 f), Cian Doyle 0-2, Ciaran Cunningham 0-1 (0-1 f), Liam Galway 0-1		Cathal Coughlan 1-4 (1 pen, 0-1 f), Seamus Kinsella 0-4 (0-3 f), Sean Bambrick 0-1, Mikey Bambrick 0-1, Patrick Hickey 0-1	Dr Cullen Park

=== Semi-finals ===
21 September 2019; 19:00	Palatine	0-11 - 0-9	Rathvilly	Dr Cullen Park
21 September 2019; 19:00	Stephen Reilly 0-2, Jason Kane 0-2, Shane O Neill 0-2, Conor Crowley 0-2, Andrew Kehoe 0-2, Jack Brennan 0-1		Brendan Murphy 0-4, Gary Dempsey 0-3, Darragh Murphy 0-1, JJ Smith 0-1	Dr Cullen Park

2 October 2019; 19:30	Éire Óg	1-30 - 0-5	Bagenalstown Gaels	Dr Cullen Park
2 October 2019; 19:30	Cormac Mullins 1-4, Jordan Morrissey 0-4, Chris Blake 0-4, (0-1 f), Darragh O’Brien 0-3, Ross Dunphy 0-3, Sean Gannon 0-2, Colm Hulton 0-2, Rickie Keating 0-2, (45, f), Niall Quinlan 0-1, Richie Mahon 0-1, Mark Furey 0-1, Benny Kavanagh 0-1, Eoghan Ruth 0-1, Derek Hayden 0-1		Robbie Kane 0-4 (0-3 f), Ciaran Cunningham 0-1 (45)	Dr Cullen Park

=== Final ===
6 October 2019; 3:45pm	Éire Óg	1-16 - 0-5	Palatine	Dr Cullen Park
6 October 2019; 3:45pm	Chris Blake 0-06 (4 f), Recce Denieffe 1-01, Niall Quinlan 0-04 (3 f), Cormac Mullins 0-02, Jordan Morrissey 0-02, Rickie Keating 0-1 (1 f),	Report	Andrew Kehoe 0-02 (1 f), David Reid 0-01, Jack Brennan 0-01, Conor Crowley 0-01	Dr Cullen Park

== Relegation play off ==
24 September 2019; 19:00	Mt. Leinster Rangers	3-11 - 2-10	Ballinabranna	Dr Cullen Park
