= 1997–98 All-Ireland Senior Club Football Championship =

- Dates: 5 October 1997 – 17 March 1998
- Teams: 33
- Champions: Corofin (1st title); Ray Silke (captain); Paul McGettigan (manager)
- Runners-up: Erin's Isle; Ken Spratt (captain); Mick Noonan (manager)

Tournament statistics
- Matches played: 35
- Top scorer(s): Ciaran O'Hare (5-27)

The 1997–98 All-Ireland Senior Club Football Championship was the 28th staging of the All-Ireland Senior Club Football Championship since its establishment by the Gaelic Athletic Association in 1970-71. The championship began on 5 October 1997 and ended on 17 March 1998.

Crossmaglen Rangers entered the championship as the defending champions, however, they were beaten by Errigal Ciarán in the Ulster Club Championship.

On 17 March 1998, Corofin won the championship following a 0-15 to 0-10 defeat of Erin's Isle in the All-Ireland final at Croke Park. It was their first ever championship title.

Erin's Isle's Ciaran O'Hare was the championship's top scorer with 5-27.

== Connacht ==
=== Quarter-final ===
26 October 1997 Quarter-final	St Brigid's	0-06 - 1-11	Knockmore	Kiltoom
	F Dolan 0-2, B Lennon 0-1, P Kilcommin 0-1, B O'Brien 0-1, T Lennon 0-1.		P Brogan 0-6, S Sweeney 1-2, J Davis 0-1, P Cawley 0-1, K Staunton 0-1.

=== Semi-finals ===
9 November 1997 Semi-final	Corofin	2-11 - 2-07	Knockmore	Tuam Stadium
	M Donnellan 2-4, E Sheede 0-3, D Reilly 0-2, S Conlisk 0-2.		P Brogan 1-4, P Cawley 1-0, P Butler 0-2, J Davis 0-1.

9 November 1997 Semi-final	Allen Gaels	2-02 - 0-08	Tourlestrane	Páirc Seán Mac Diarmada
	A Cullen 1-2, S McGettigan 1-0.		M Walsh 0-4, D Durkin 0-2, S Dunne 0-1, J Lundy 0-1.

23 November 1997 Semi-final replay	Tourlestrane	0-07 - 0-09	Allen Gaels	Markievicz Park
	G McGowan 0-4, C O'Meara 0-1, M Walsh 0-1, J Egan 0-1.		N Moran 0-4, A Cullen 0-2, M McGowan 0-1, A Fee 0-1, S McGuire 0-1.

=== Final ===
7 December 1997 Final	Allen Gaels	0-11 - 2-10	Corofin	Páirc Seán Mac Diarmada
	D Lynch 0-5, N Moran 0-3, A Fee 0-2, S McGettigan 0-1.		E Steede 1-3, D Reilly 1-0, M Donnellan 0-3, A Donnellan 0-2, T Burke 0-1, J Lardener 0-1.

== Leinster ==
=== First round ===
26 October 1997 First round	Dicksboro	2-04 - 4-05	Moate	Nowlan Park
	S Walton 1-2, M Kennedy 1-0, M Sheehan 0-1, N Lacey 0-1.		J Deehan 3-0, M Broder 1-0, D Browne 0-2, G Heavin 0-2, A Malone 0-1.

26 October 1997 First round	Erin's Isle	5-22 - 0-05	Old Leighlin	Parnell Park
	R Boyle 2-5, C O'Hare 2-5, N Crossan 1-8, J Barr 0-2, P Cunningham 0-1, C Redmond 0-1.		J Nevin 0-2, B O'Brien 0-1, S Hayden 0-1, M Roche 0-1.

26 October 1997 First round	Killanerin	1-04 - 1-04	Rathnew	Páirc Uí Shíocháin
	D Noonan 1-0, M Forde 0-2, P Forde 0-1, J Hegarty 0-1.		T Gill 1-0, D Coffey 0-3, K Gill 0-1.

27 October 1997 First round	Fr Manning Gaels	1-14 - 1-04	Stradbally	Pearse Park
	P Davis 1-4, Michael Mulleady 0-4, J Tully 0-3, D Hanniffy 0-1, C Hanniffy 0-1, Martin Mulleady 0-1.		P McCormack 1-0 (og), D Delaney 0-2, G Ramsbottom 0-1, B Larkin 0-1.

=== Quarter-finals ===
9 November 1997 Quarter-final	Rathnew	1-06 - 0-09	Navan O'Mahony's	Aughrim Park
	K Gill 1-1, D Coffey 0-4, J Snell 0-1.		D Doonan 0-2, C Kane 0-2, M Reilly 0-2, A Reilly 0-1, G Nelson 0-1, D Hosey 0-1.

9 November 1997 Quarter-final	Fr Manning Gaels	0-11 - 0-11	Stabannon Parnells	Pearse Park
	P Davis 0-5, Michael Mulleady 0-3, D Hanniffy 0-1, C Hanniffy 0-1, J Breslin 0-1.		P Butterly 0-8, Paudie Donnolly 0-1, B Murray 0-1, N Butterly 0-1.

9 November 1997 Quarter-final	Moate	3-01 - 2-13	Clane	Páirc Ciaráin
	D Costelloe 2-0, G Heavin 1-1.		B O'Donovan 1-2, P McCormack 1-0, E McCormack 0-3, M Lynch 0-3, P McLoughlin 0-2, K McLoughlin 0-1, K McDonald 0-1, B Cahill 0-1.

9 November 1997 Quarter-final	Erin's Isle	1-10 - 0-11	Edenderry	Parnell Park
	C O'Hare 1-5, R Boyle 0-2, N Crossan 0-2, P Cunningham 0-1.		P Brady 0-7, B Malone 0-2, C Farrell 0-1, D Farrell 0-1.

15 November 1997 Quarter-final replay	Navan O'Mahony's	0-09 - 1-08	Rathnew	Páirc Tailteann
	D Hosie 0-3, C Kane 0-2, D Doonan 0-2, M Reilly 0-1, D Beggy 0-1.		T Gill 1-2, D Coffey 0-3, T McGivern 0-1, T Doyle 0-1, V Collard 0-1.

15 November 1997 Quarter-final replay	Stabannon Parnells	0-16 - 1-10 (aet)	Fr Manning Gaels	Drogheda Park
	P Butterly 0-11, G Hoey 0-2, P Donnelly 0-2, J Donaldson 0-1.		P Davis 0-9, D Hanniffy 1-0, J Tully 0-1.

=== Semi-finals ===
23 November 1997 Semi-final	Clane	0-12 - 0-04	Rathnew	Parnell Park
	P McCormack 0-4, M Lynch 0-4, P McLoughlin 0-2, K McDonald 0-1, D O'Connell 0-1.		D Coffey 0-4.

23 November 1997 Semi-final	Erin's Isle	0-11 - 0-08	Stabannon Parnells	Páirc Tailteann
	C O'Hare 0-5, E Barr 0-2, C Redmond 0-2, M Deegan 0-1, N Crossan 0-1.		P Butterly 0-3, B Murray 0-2, J Hoey 0-1, N Butterly 0-1, P Donnelly 0-1.

=== Final ===
7 December 1997 Final	Erin's Isle	2-11 - 1-11	Clane	Páirc Tailteann
	C O'Hare 1-2, C Redmond 0-4, N Crossan 1-0, P Cunningham 0-3, R Boyle 0-2.		P McLoughlin 0-5, T Cribben 1-0, P McCormack 0-2, B Murphy 0-1, B Cahill 0-1, D O'Connell 0-1, W McCreery 0-1.

== Munster ==
=== Quarter-finals ===
25 October 1997 Quarter-final	The Nire	2-05 - 2-23	Castlehaven	Fraher Field
	M Guiry 0-4, B Power 1-0, B Wall 1-0, B Kearney 0-1.		C Crowley 1-7, E Cleary 1-4, A Crowley 0-6, M O'Mahony 0-1, L Tompkins 0-1, J Maguire 0-1, D Cahalane 0-1, D Cleary 0-1, L O'Connell 0-1.

26 October 1997 Quarter-final	Galbally	0-12 - 1-13	Fethard	Gaelic Grounds
	J Cummins 0-6, E Scully 0-2, M McGrath 0-1, S Morrissey 0-1, P McCarthy 0-1, D Ryan 0-1.		J O'Meara 1-4, M Coen 0-3, T Sheehan 0-2, M Quinlan 0-2, M Fitzgerald 0-1, JP Looby 0-1.

=== Semi-finals ===
23 November 1997 Semi-final	Fethard	0-06 - 0-04	Cooraclare	Ned Hall Park
	M Coen 0-3, B Burke 0-1, J O'Meara 0-1, T Sheehan 0-1.		D Hedigan 0-2, M Morrissey 0-1, D Lynch 0-1.

7 December 1997 Semi-final	Castlehaven	2-10 - 1-03	Laune Rangers	Castlehaven
	J Cleary 2-3, L Tompkins 0-3, C Crowley 0-2, A Crowley 0-1, F Cahalane 0-1.		B Gannon 1-0, P O'Sullivan 0-2, G Murphy 0-1.

=== Final ===
14 December 1997 Final	Castlehaven	1-14 - 1-08	Fethard	Páirc Mac Gearailt
	L Tompkins 0-8, J Cleary 1-4, F Cahalane 0-1, S Connolly 0-1.		D Byrnes 1-1, M Fitzgerald 0-1, M Spillane 0-1, C Coen 0-1, T Sheehan 0-1, M Quinlan 0-1, M Coen 0-1, J O'Meara 0-1.

== Ulster ==
=== Preliminary round ===
5 October 1997 Preliminary round	Gowna	0-10 - 0-15	Burren	Breffni Park
	Declan McCabe 0-4, Dermot McCabe 0-2, K Madden 0-2, D Brady 0-1, B Morris 0-1.		J Treanor 0-6, J McAlinden 0-4, G Murdock 0-4, A McGovern 0-1.

=== Quarter-finals ===
5 October 1997 Quarter-final	Clontibret O'Neill's	1-10 - 1-11	Errigal Ciarán	Páirc Uí Néill
	Declan McCabe 0-4, P McShane 1-0, D Brennan 0-3, Dermot McCabe 0-2, M O'Dowd 0-1.		E Gormley 0-6, E Kavanagh 1-0, E McCaffrey 0-3, P Canavan 0-2.

5 October 1997 Quarter-final	Dungiven	0-13 - 0-05	Newtownbutler	Dean McGlinchey Park
	J Brolly 0-6, P Murphy 0-3, C Greeve 0-3, G McGonagle 0-1.		B McBrian 0-3, C McManus 0-1, R Johnson 0-1.

5 October 1997 Quarter-final	St Paul's	3-16 - 2-07	Aodh Ruadh	Casement Park
	J McManus 0-8, J Kennedy 1-2, P McErlean 1-1, C Murphy 1-0, J Quinn 0-2, A Donnelly 0-2, C Killane 0-1.		D Buggy 1-2, B Roper 1-0, D Condon 0-3, V Murray 0-2.

12 October 1997 Quarter-final	Burren	2-08 - 3-09	Crossmaglen Rangers	Páirc Esler
	J McAlinden 1-2, A Woods 1-0, J Treanor 0-3, A McGivern 0-1, T Fegan 0-1, D McLoughlin 0-1.		J McConville 3-2, O McConville 0-5, J McEntee 0-1, C Short 0-1.

=== Semi-finals ===
26 October 1997 Semi-final	Errigal Ciarán	1-12 - 1-10	Crossmaglen Rangers	St Tiernach's Park
	E Gormley 1-9, Peter Canavan 0-1, E Kavanagh 0-1, Pascal Canavan 0-1.		J Mcconville 1-1, O McConville 0-4, C Short 0-2, J McEntee 0-2, D O'Neill 0-1.

26 October 1997 Semi-final	Dungiven	0-12 - 0-10	St Paul's	St. Tiernach's Park
	J Brolly 0-8, G McGonagle 0-4.		J McManus 0-5, J Kennedy 0-2, P McErlean 0-1, A Donnelly 0-1, A Finnegan 0-1.

=== Final ===
9 November 1997 Final	Dungiven	0-14 - 1-08	Errigal Ciarán	St Tiernach's Park
	G McGonagle 0-5, J Brolly 0-3, C Grieve 0-3, S Heavern 0-1, P Murphy 0-1, R Murphy 0-1.		E Gormley 0-5, A McGinley 1-0, P Canavan 0-2, B Neill 0-1.

== Quarter-final ==
8 February 1998 Quarter-final	Tír Chonaill Gaels	0-08 - 0-15	Castlehaven	Emerald GAA Grounds
	T Maguire 0-2, B McDonagh 0-2, M Summers 0-1, B Mulvey 0-1, A Carr 0-1, G O'Regan 0-1.		J Cleary 0-6, A Crowley 0-3, B Deasy 0-2, L Tompkins 0-2, C Crowley 0-1, D Cahalane 0-1.

== Semi-finals ==
22 February 1998 Semi-final	Corofin	0-11 - 0-09	Dungiven	Fr Tierney Park
	A Donnellan 0-2, M Donnellan 0-2, E Steede 0-2, D Reilly 0-2, T Burke 0-2, S Conlisk 0-1.		J Brolly 0-5, G McGonigle 0-2, P Murphy 0-2.

22 February 1998 Semi-final	Erin's Isle	2-12 - 0-17	Castlehaven	Semple Stadium
	C O'Hare 1-4, N Crossan 1-2, C Redmond 0-2, K Barr 0-1, J Barr 0-1, E Barr 0-1, R Boyle 0-1.		L Tompkins 0-4, J Cleary 0-3, F Cahalane 0-3, D Cahalane 0-2, J Maguire 0-2, C Crowley 0-2, B Deasy 0-1.

== Final ==
17 March 1998 Final	Corofin	0-15 - 0-10	Erin's Isle	Croke Park
	D Reilly 0-6, G Burke 0-3, S Conlisk 0-3, A Donnellan 0-1, M Donnellan 0-1, E Steede 0-1.		C O'Hare 0-6, D Collins 0-1, N Crossan 0-1, K Barr 0-1, R Boyle 0-1.

== Statistics ==
=== Top scorers ===
Overall

Rank	Player	Club	Tally	Total	Matches	Average
1	Ciaran O'Hare	Erin's Isle	5-27	42	6	7.00
2	John Cleary	Castlehaven	3-16	25	5	5.00
3	Niall Crossan	Erin's Isle	3-14	23	6	3.83
3	Eoin Gormley	Errigal Ciaran	1-20	23	3	7.66
4	Pat Butterly	Stabannon Parnells	0-22	22	3	7.33
4	Joe Brolly	Dungiven	0-22	22	4	5.50
5	Pádraic Davis	Fr Manning Gaels	1-18	21	3	7.00
6	Larry Tompkins	Castlehaven	0-18	18	5	3.60
7	Robbie Boyle	Erin's Isle	2-11	17	6	2.83
8	Michael Donnellan	Corofin	2-10	16	4	4.00

In a single game

Rank	Player	Club	Tally	Total	Opposition
1	Eoin Gormley	Errigal Ciaran	1-09	12	Crossmaglen Rangers
2	Jim McConville	Crossmaglen Rangers	3-02	11	Burren
2	Robbie Boyle	Erin's Isle	2-05	11	Old Leighlin
2	Ciaran O'Hare	Erin's Isle	2-05	11	Old Leighlin
2	Niall Crossan	Erin's Isle	1-08	11	Old Leighlin
2	Pat Butterly	Stabannon Parnells	0-11	11	Fr Manning Gaels
3	Michael Donnellan	Corofin	2-04	10	Knockmore
3	Colin Crowley	Castlehaven	1-07	10	The Nire
4	John Deehan	Moate	3-00	9	Dicksboro
4	John Cleary	Castlehaven	2-03	9	Laune Rangers
4	Pádraic Davis	Fr Manning Gaels	0-09	9	Stabannon Parnells

=== Miscellaneous ===
- Erin's Isle won the Leinster Club SFC for the first time.
- Charlie Redmond of Erin's Isle was suspended for the final after being sent off in the semi-final; he had intended the decider against Corofin to be his last game as a player.
- Dungiven won the Ulster Club SFC for the first time.
