= Old Leighlin GAA =

GAA club in Old Leighlin, County Carlow, Ireland

Old Leighlin
- Seanleithghlinn
- Founded: 1952
- County: Carlow
- Colours
- Grounds: Molaise Park

Playing kits
Standard colours

Senior Club Championships
	All Ireland	Leinster champions	Carlow champions
Football:	0	0	5

Old Leighlin GAA Club is a Gaelic Athletic Association club in Old Leighlin, County Carlow, Ireland. The club is affiliated to the Carlow County Board and is exclusively concerned with the game of Gaelic football.

== History ==
Located in the parish of Old Leighlin, on the Carlow–Kilkenny border, Old Leighlin GAA Club was founded in 1952. The club spent most of its early existence operating in the junior grade. Old Leighlin had its first major success when, in 1974, the club claimed the Carlow JAFC title following a 3–09 to 3–06 win over St Andrew's.

Old Leighlin secured senior status for the first time the following year, when a defeat of Éire Óg won them the Carlow IFC title. It was the first of three such titles, with further victories in 1986 and 1996. Old Leighlin won the Carlow SFC title for the first time in their history after a 1–10 to 0–11 win over Palatine.

The period between 2009 and 2015 saw Old Leighlin win three Carlow SFC titles from six final appearances in seven seasons, after defeats of Rathvilly (2010 and 2013) and Tinryland (2011). The club claimed its fifth Carlow SFC title in 2025, following a one-point win over Rathvilly in the final.

== Honours ==
- Carlow Senior Football Championship (5): 1997, 2010, 2011, 2013, 2025
- Carlow Intermediate Football Championship (3): 1975, 1986, 1996
- Carlow Junior A Football Championship (1): 1974

== Notable players ==
- Johnny Nevin: All-Ireland SBFC-winner (1994)
