= Vinny Harvey =

Irish Gaelic footballer (1937–2022)

Personal information
- Native name: Uinseann Ó hAirmhí (Irish)
- Nickname: Harv
- Born: 1937 Carlow, Ireland
- Died: 1 November 2022 (aged 85) Carlow, Ireland
- Occupation: Rates collector

Sport
- Sport: Gaelic football
- Position: Centre-forward
Club
- Years: Club
- Éire Óg
Club titles
- Carlow titles: 5
Inter-county
- Years: County
- 1956–1965: Carlow
Inter-county titles
- Leinster titles: 0
- All-Irelands: 0
- NFL: 0

Vincent Harvey (1937 – 1 November 2022) was an Irish Gaelic footballer and manager. He played with club side Éire Óg and at inter-county level with the Carlow senior football team. Harvey also served as manager of a range of club teams.

== Playing career ==
Harvey was a founder-member of the Éire Óg club in Carlow in 1956. He enjoyed his first success at adult level when Éire Óg won the Carlow JFC title in 1958. The following decade saw Harvey win Carlow SFC titles with the club in 1960, 1962, 1965, 1967 and 1968. His performances at club level earned a call-up to the Carlow senior football team and he made a number of appearances for the team in the National League and Leinster Championship.

== Management career ==
After his playing days, Harvey managed a number of club teams in Carlow, Wicklow, Kildare, Laois and Wexford. He brought various championship successes to Kiltegan, Ballymanus, Tinahely, Coolboy and Knockananna. Harvey was also manager of the Carlow under-21 team that reached the Leinster final in 1984.

== Personal life and death ==
In his working life, Harvey started his working life as a telegram boy with Carlow Post Office, graduating to postman for the Carlow area. He later took up a position as rate and revenue collector with Carlow County Council.

Harvey died on 1 November 2022, at the age of 85.

== Honours ==
=== Player ===
Éire Óg

- Carlow Senior Football Championship: 1960, 1962, 1965, 1967, 1968

=== Management ===
Kiltegan

- Wicklow Intermediate Football Championship: 1975
- Wicklow Junior A Football Championship: 1975

Ballymanus

- Wicklow Intermediate Football Championship: 1986
- Wicklow Junior A Football Championship: 1980

Tinahely

- Wicklow Senior Football Championship: 1984

Coolboy

- Wicklow Junior A Football Championship: 1985

Knockananna

- Wicklow Junior A Football Championship: 1989
- Wicklow Junior B Football Championship: 1987
