= Michael O'Hanrahan =

Irish rebel (1877–1916)

- Mícheál Ó hAnnracháin
- Michael O'Hanrahan
- Born: 17 March 1877; New Ross, Ireland
- Died: 4 May 1916 (aged 39); Kilmainham Gaol, Dublin, Ireland
- Cause of death: Execution by firing squad
- Military career
- Allegiance: Irish Republic
- Branch: Irish Volunteers
- Service years: 1913–1916
- Rank: Vice-Commandant
- Units: 2nd Battalion, Dublin Brigade, Irish Volunteers
- Conflicts: Easter Rising
- Memorials: Wexford railway station

Michael O'Hanrahan (Irish: Mícheál Ó hAnnracháin; 17 March 1877 – 4 May 1916) was an Irish rebel who was executed for his active role in the 1916 Easter Rising.

== Background ==
He was born as Michael Hanrahan in New Ross, County Wexford, Ireland, the son of Richard Hanrahan, a cork cutter, and Mary Williams. His father appears to have been involved in the 1867 Fenian rising. The family moved to Carlow, where Michael was educated at Carlow Christian Brothers' School and Carlow College Academy. On leaving school he worked various jobs including a period alongside his father in the cork-cutting business. In 1898 he joined the Gaelic League and in 1899 founded the League's first Carlow branch and became its secretary. Also in 1899 he helped found a Workingmen's club in Carlow. By 1903 he was in Dublin, where he was working as a proof-reader for the Gaelic League printer An Cló Cumann. He published journalism under the by-lines 'Art' and 'Irish Reader' in several nationalist newspapers, including Sinn Féin and the Irish Volunteer. He was the author of two novels A Swordsman of the Brigade (1914) and When the Norman Came (published posthumously in 1918).

== Political involvement ==
In 1903 he became involved in Maud Gonne and Arthur Griffith's campaign against the visit of King Edward VII to Ireland. The encounter with Griffith led O'Hanrahan to join the newly formed Sinn Féin. He also became a member of the Irish Republican Brotherhood. In November 1913 he joined the Irish Volunteers. O'Hanrahan was later employed as an administrator on the Volunteers headquarters staff. He was made quartermaster general of the 2nd Battalion. He and the commandant of the 2nd Battalion Thomas MacDonagh became close friends.

== 1916 Easter Rising ==
He was second in command of Dublin's 2nd battalion under Commandant Thomas MacDonagh. He fought at Jacob's Biscuit Factory, though the battalion saw little action other than intense sniping throughout Easter week, as the British Army largely kept clear of the impregnable factory dominating the road from Portobello Barracks on one side and Dublin Castle on the other. When in May the situation became desperate O'Hanrahan told his commanding officer MacDonagh they "were inviting destruction of the factory by incendiary shells, and also of the surrounding thickly populated area". MacDonagh ordered a break-out amidst the chaos and confusion. O'Hanrahan led "with some difficulty" the garrison out of the factory through New Bride Street gate.

O'Hanrahan was executed by firing squad on 4 May 1916 at Kilmainham Gaol. His brother, Henry O'Hanrahan, was sentenced to penal servitude for life for his role in the Easter Rising. After his execution O'Hanrahan's mother and three sisters opened a shop near Mountjoy Prison where they developed a secret line of communications between prisoners and their visitors.

=== Commemoration ===
Wexford railway station is named in commemoration of O'Hanrahan, as is the road bridge over the River Barrow at New Ross. Two Gaelic games sports clubs are named after him: Geraldine O'Hanrahans GAA (New Ross) and O'Hanrahans GFC (Carlow town).

== Writings ==
- A Swordsman of the Brigade (1914)
- When the Norman Came (published posthumously in 1918).
