= Rathvilly Moat =

Motte in County Carlow, Ireland

- Ráth Bhile (Irish)
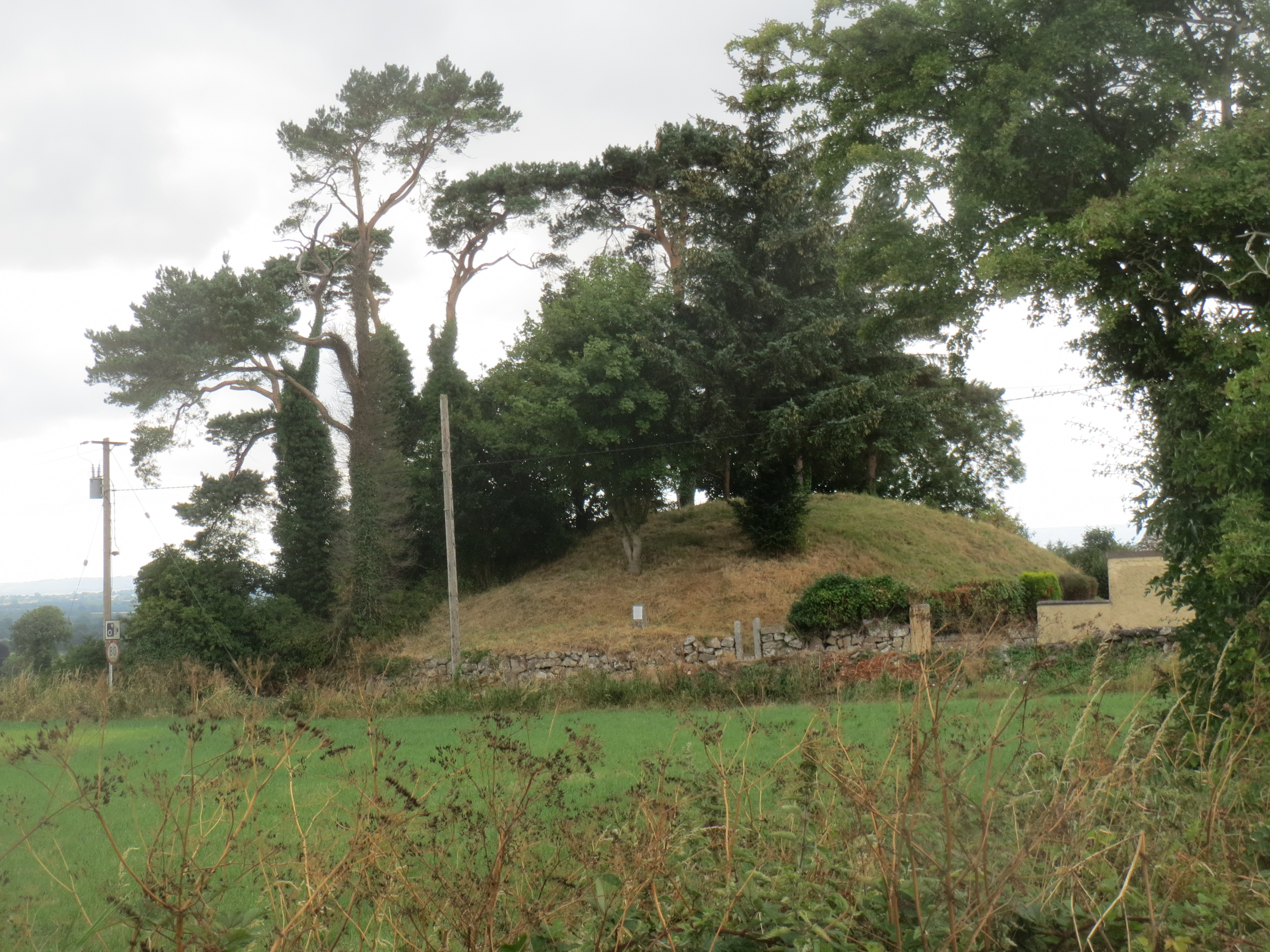
- Knockroe-Rathvilly Motte

- Location within Ireland
- 52°52′50″N 6°40′41″W
- Type: Motte
- Periods: Early Christian Ireland
- Location: Knockroe, Rathvilly, County Carlow, Ireland

Site notes
- Material: Earth
- Diameter: 29 metres (32 yd)

Designations
- Designation: National Monument

National monument of Ireland
- Official name: Rathvilly Moat
- Reference no.: 603

Rathvilly Moat is a motte and National Monument located in County Carlow, Ireland.

== Location ==
Rathvilly Moat is located in the townland of Knockroe about 1 km east of Rathvilly village, east of the River Slaney.

== History and archaeology ==
The moat of Rathvilly was the residence of Crimthann mac Énnai, an Uí Cheinnselaig King of Leinster, who reigned c. 443–483 and was baptised by Saint Patrick. The placename means "ringfort of the sacred tree"; a bile was sacred to a certain family or ancestral group, and destroying an enemy clan's bile was a common act of war.
