= Fighting Cocks GAA =

GAA club in Rathoe, County Carlow, Ireland

Fighting Cocks
- Na Coilig Troidhe
- Founded: 1928
- County: Carlow
- Nickname: The Cocks
- Colours
- Grounds: Fighting Cocks GAA Grounds

Playing kits
Standard colours

Senior Club Championships
	All Ireland	Leinster champions	Carlow champions
Football:	0	0	1

Fighting Cocks GAA is a Gaelic Athletic Association club in Rathtoe, County Carlow, Ireland. The club is affiliated to the Carlow County Board and is exclusively concerned with the game of Gaelic football.

== History ==
Located in Rathoe, about five miles from Tullow town, Fighting Cocks GAA Club was founded in 1928. The club spent its early years operating in the junior grade, before winning the Carlow JFC title in 1932. Just a decade after being founded, Fighting Cocks claimed its sole Carlow SFC title in 1938. The next few decades saw the club return to the junior ranks once again. A further five Carlow JFC titles were won at various times between 1943 and 1999. Fighting Cocks won its first Carlow IFC title in 2012. The club's most recent success was a seventh Carlow JFC title in 2025.

== Honours ==
- Carlow Senior Football Championship (1): 1938
- Carlow Intermediate Football Championship (1): 2012
- Carlow Junior A Football Championship (7): 1932, 1943, 1966, 1971, 1990, 1999, 2025
