= Palatine, County Carlow =

Village in Leinster, Ireland

Coordinates: 52.865°N 6.860°W

Welcome sign and road signage at Palatine, County Carlow

Palatine (Irish: Na Cnoic Arda) is a village in County Carlow, Ireland. It lies mostly within the townlands of Knockarda and Killyshane, close to the County Kildare border. Its unusual English name bears no relation to its original Irish name, Na Cnoic Arda, which roughly translates as 'high hills'. According to its entry in A Topographical Dictionary of Ireland, published by Samuel Lewis in 1837, the area's English name is said to derive "from a colony of German refugees, who were driven from their native country, and settled here, in the reign of Louis XIV". As of the 2022 census, Palatine had a population of 276.

== See also ==
- Palatine GAA
- List of towns and villages in the Republic of Ireland
