= Rathvilly =

Village in County Carlow, Ireland

Rathvilly Irish: Ráth Bhile
- Village
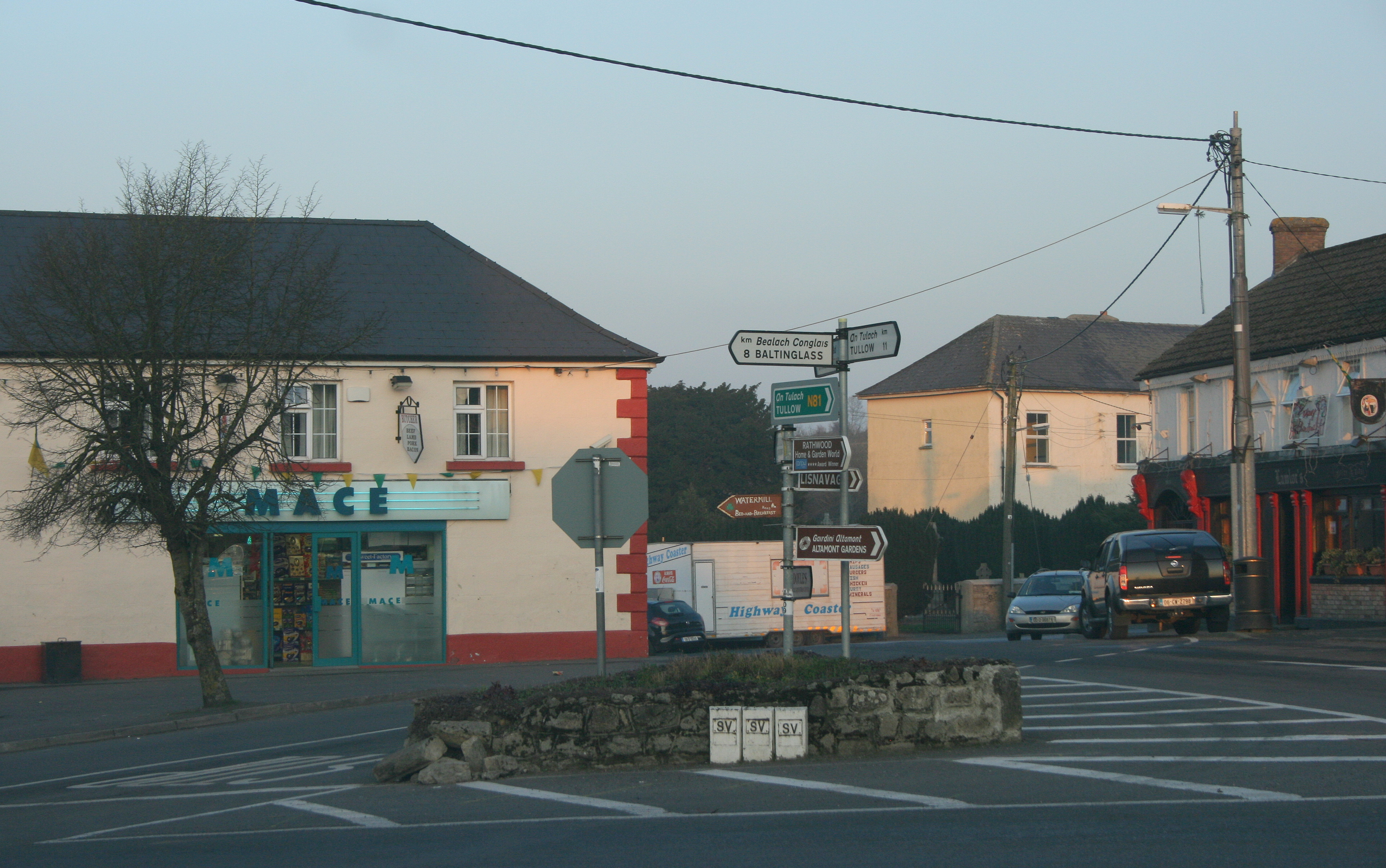

- Location in Ireland
- Coordinates: 52.881°N 6.695°W
- Country: Ireland
- Province: Leinster
- County: County Carlow
- Dáil Éireann: Wicklow
- Elevation: 120 m (390 ft)

Population (2022)
  - Total: 1,074
- Irish Grid Reference: S880817

Rathvilly (Irish: Ráth Bhile, meaning 'ringfort of the trees') is a village, civil parish and townland in County Carlow, Ireland. The village is on the River Slaney, near the border with County Wicklow and County Kildare, 11 km (7 mi) from Tullow and 8 km (5 mi) from Baltinglass. It is also on the N81 national secondary route. Rathvilly won the Irish Tidy Towns Competition in 1961, 1963, and 1968.

== History ==
In the centre of the village, there is a statue dedicated to Kevin Barry, an 18-year-old who was executed for his part in the Irish War of Independence on 1 November 1920. Though from Dublin, Barry had family locally and had attended the national school in Rathvilly.

In February 1990, a two-year-old purebred Charolais heifer named 'Dreamer', was found to have survived five months without water whilst trapped between bales of hay in a local farmer's hayshed. It is understood that Dreamer accidentally wandered into the shed unnoticed in September 1989 whilst bales were being stacked and subsequently became trapped. After her discovery, her owner Vincent Balfe noted that under such conditions the heifer should have only survived for two or three weeks, but remarkably, had somehow survived for 24. The heifer lost four hundredweight in weight during her five-month ordeal but, when found, was standing up, supple, was not emaciated, did not have sunken eyes, and did not have any sores or injuries. The news made headlines in Ireland and reached the press as far away as South America. Experts and veterinary surgeons could not understand how the animal had survived so long on just straw, without any water, but it is possible that occasional rain squalls which blew into the shed pooled on portions of the plastic, providing water for her to drink. In the years that followed, Dreamer made appearances at various high-profile events, including the National Ploughing Championships as well as other farm-related events. A commemorative event was held in February 2020 marking 30 years since the cow's discovery.

== Places of interest ==
Rathvilly Moat, a medieval structure, is found one mile off the village on Hacketstown Road. The Lisnavagh Estate lies just outside the village of Rathvilly. One mile northeast of Rathvilly are the remains of Waterstown Monastic Site. Two crosses, one limestone from the medieval period and another worn cross with deep mouldings can be found there. Across the road sits a bullaun well.

== Sport ==
Rathvilly GAA club is the village's Gaelic Athletic Association team. The teams play in green and gold jerseys and have won the Carlow Senior Football Championship 10 times in their history. The club's most recent championship win came in 2024. Rathvilly's Brendan Murphy has represented his country in the annual AFL series on several occasions. In 2015, a Rathvilly team won the Under-16 Carlow A Championship. In 2013, the Rathvilly Junior-A team completed the double, winning both championship and league finals.

== Transport ==
Rathvilly railway station opened on 1 June 1886, closed for passenger traffic on 27 January 1947 and finally closed altogether on 1 April 1959.

== See also ==
- List of towns and villages in Ireland
