= Carlow Senior Football Championship =

Annual Gaelic football competition

- Irish: Craobh Sinsear Peile
- Founded: 1889
- Title holders: Rathvilly (11th title)
- Most titles: Éire Óg (31 titles)
- Sponsors: Michael Lyng Motors

The Carlow Senior Football Championship (currently also known for sponsorship reasons as the Michael Lyng Motors Carlow SFC), is an annual Gaelic football competition contested by top-tier Carlow GAA clubs. The Carlow County Board of the Gaelic Athletic Association has organised it since 1889.

Rathvilly are the title holders (2026) defeating Old Leighlin in the Final.

== Teams ==
=== 2026 Teams ===
Team	Location	Colours	Position in 2025	In championship since	Championship titles	Last championship title
Bagenalstown Gaels	Bagenalstown	Green and black	Semi-finals	2019	0	—
Éire Óg	Carlow	Red and white	Relegation final	—	31	2023
Fenagh	Fenagh	Blue and white	Quarter-finals	2025	—	—
Grange	Grange	Blue and white	Intermediate champions	2026	—	—
Mount Leinster Rangers	Borris	Black and red	Quarter-finals	—	0	—
Old Leighlin	Old Leighlin	Blue and white	Champions	—	5	2025
Palatine	Palatine	Red and green	Semi-finals	—	7	2022
Rathvilly	Rathvilly	Green and yellow	Runners-up	—	10	2024

=== 2026 Football Grades ===
Championship	Club
Senior
Senior	Bagenalstown Gaels
Senior	Éire Óg
Senior	Fenagh
Senior	Grange
Senior	Mount Leinster Rangers
Senior	Old Leighlin
Senior	Palatine
Senior	Rathvilly
Intermediate
Intermediate	Ballinabranna
Intermediate	Ballon
Intermediate	Clonmore
Intermediate	Éire Óg (2nd team)
Intermediate	The Fighting Cocks
Intermediate	Kildavin/Clonegal
Intermediate	St. Patrick's
Intermediate	Tinryland
Junior
Junior
Junior	Asca
Junior	Éire Óg (3rd team)
Junior	Kilbride
Junior	Leighlinbridge
Junior	Naomh Eoin
Junior	Palatine (2nd Team)
Junior	Rathvilly (2nd Team)
Junior	O'Hanrahans

== History ==
The Carlow Senior Club Football Championship began in 1889 when O'Gorman-Mahon's (Parish of Kilbride, Ballon and Rathoe) defeated Tullow Stars and Stripes by a very low scoreline of 1-01 to 0-00. There was no Carlow senior club football championship between 1891 and 1897. The 1941 championship was abandoned due to an outbreak of foot and mouth disease. Éire Óg are the most successful team, having won the title on 31 occasions.

== Honours ==
The winning club qualifies to represent the county in the Leinster Senior Club Football Championship, the winners of which progress to the All-Ireland Senior Club Football Championship.

== List of finals ==
(r) = replay

Year	Winner	Score	Opponent	Score
1889	Ballon O'Gorman Mahons		Tullow Stars and Stripes	
1890	Carlow		Crecerin	
1891	No competition			
1892	No competition			
1893	No competition			
1894	No competition			
1895	No competition			
1896	No competition			
1897	No competition			
1898	Loughmartin Emmets		Crosslaw	
1899	Loughmartin Emmets			
1900	Loughmartin Emmets			
1901	Loughmartin Emmets			
1902	Tullow St Patrick's		Carlow Barrow Rangers	
1903	Carlow Barrow Rangers		Leaney	
1904	Tullow St Patrick's			
1905	No competition			
1906	No competition			
1907	No competition			
1908	Carlow-Graigue		Newtown	
1909	Carlow-Graigue		Tinryland	
1910	Carlow-Graigue		Borris	
1911	Borris		Knocksquire	
1912	Carlow-Graigue		Borris	
1913	Carlow-Graigue			
1914	Carlow-Graigue		Tullow	
1915	Carlow-Graigue			
1916	Tullow St Patrick's		Tinryland	
1917	No competition			
1918	Carlow-Graigue		Palatine	
1919	Palatine		Carlow-Graigue	
1920	Palatine		Tinryland	
1921	Carlow-Graigue		Bagnelstown	
1922	Carlow-Graigue		O'Hanrahans	
1923	Carlow-Graigue		Tullow	
1924	Carlow-Graigue		Milford	
1925	Carlow-Graigue		Milford	
1926	Milford		Graiguecullen	
1927	O'Hanrahans	0-05	Leighlinbridge	1-01
1928	O'Hanrahans	0-06	Leighlinbridge	0-04
1929	Leighlinbridge		O'Hanrahans	
1930	O'Hanrahans	2-01	Leighlinbridge	0-03
1931	O'Hanrahans	1-06	Bagnelstown/Carrig United	1-03
1932	O'Hanrahans	0-04	Leighlinbridge	1-00
1933	Milford		Leighlinbridge	
1934	Tinryland		Shamrocks	
1935	Kilbride		Leighlinbridge	
1936	Tinryland		Leighlinbridge	
1937	O'Hanrahans	1-07	Young Emmetts	0-03
1938	Fighting Cocks		Tinryland	
1939	Tinryland		Kilbride	
1940	Tinryland		Fighting Cocks	
1941	No competition			
1942	O'Hanrahans		League basis	
1943	Tinryland		O'Hanrahans	
1944	Tinryland		Ballymurphy	
1945	O'Hanrahans	1-10	Ballymurphy	2-05
1946	Tinryland		Ballymurphy	
1947	Ballymurphy	1-03	Kilbride	0-2
1948	Tinryland		Slaney Rovers	
1949	Tinryland		Ballymurphy	
1950	Tinryland		Palatine	
1951	O'Hanrahans	3-05	Leighlinbridge	2-01
1952	Palatine		Ballymurphy	
1953	Ballymurphy		Palatine	
1954	O'Hanrahans	2-06	Tinryland	1-03
1955	Clonmore		O'Hanrahans	
1956	Clonmore		O'Hanrahans	
1957	Leighlinbridge		Gaels	
1958	O'Hanrahans	2-05	Clonmore	0-06
1959	Tullow		Kildavin	
1960	Éire Óg		Tullow	
1961	O'Hanrahans	3-13	Éire Óg	2-05
1962	Éire Óg		O'Hanrahans	
1963	Tullow		Clonmore	
1964	Tullow		St Vincent's, Kildavin	
1965	Éire Óg		Clonmore	
1966	St Vincent's, Kildavin		Tullow	
1967	Éire Óg		Ballinabranna	
1968	Éire Óg		Ballinabranna	
1969	Éire Óg		Tullow	
1970	St Vincent's, Kildavin		Palatine	
1971	Tinryland		St Vincent's, Kildavin	
1972	Tinryland		Éire Óg	
1973	St Vincent's, Kildavin		Ballinabranna	
1974	Éire Óg		St Vincent's, Kildavin	
1975	Tinryland		Naomh Eoin	
1976	Éire Óg		St Vincent's, Kildavin	
1977	Éire Óg		St Andrew's	
1978	Éire Óg		St Andrew's	
1979	Tinryland		Éire Óg	
1980	Éire Óg		O'Hanrahans	
1981	Tinryland		Naomh Eoin	
1982	Éire Óg		St Vincent's, Kildavin	
1983	Rathvilly		Éire Óg	
1984	Éire Óg		Rathvilly	
1985	Rathvilly		Naomh Eoin	
1986	Naomh Eoin		Palatine	
1987	Éire Óg		Naomh Eoin	
1988	Éire Óg		Rathvilly	
1989	Éire Óg		Naomh Eoin	
1990	Rathvilly		Naomh Eoin	
1991	Rathvilly		Éire Óg	
1992	Éire Óg		Tinryland	
1993	Éire Óg		Slaney Rangers	
1994	Éire Óg		Rathvilly	
1995	Éire Óg		Rathvilly	
1996	Éire Óg		Palatine	
1997	Old Leighlin		Palatine	
1998	Éire Óg	0-08	Rathvilly	0-04
1999	O'Hanrahans	2-12	Éire Óg	2-10
2000	O'Hanrahans	2-08	Éire Óg	0-11
2001	O'Hanrahans	1-11	Palatine	0-07
2002	Rathvilly	2-04, 3-04 (r)	Palatine	1-07, 0-08 (r)
2003	O'Hanrahans	0-04, 0-09 (r)	Old Leighlin	0-04, 0-06 (r)
2004	Rathvilly	0-09, 0-15 (r)	Fenagh	0-09, 1-07 (r)
2005	Éire Óg	0-07	O'Hanrahans	0-06
2006	Palatine	1-09	Kildavin/Clonegal	0-11
2007	Éire Óg	1-07. 4-09 (r)	Palatine	0-10, 1-09 (r)
2008	Éire Óg	1-10, 2-09 (r)	Palatine	1-10, 0-11 (r)
2009	Rathvilly	2-08	Old Leighlin	0-07
2010	Old Leighlin	1-11	Rathvilly	0-07
2011	Old Leighlin	1-08	Tinryland	1-07
2012	Éire Óg	0-15	Palatine	
2013	Old Leighlin	1-10	Rathvilly	1-08
2014	Rathvilly	2-09	Old Leighlin	1-10
2015	Palatine	2-12	Old Leighlin	2-08
2016	Palatine	2-13	Rathvilly	0-12
2017	Éire Óg	0-12, 2-08 (r)	Rathvilly	1-09, 1-08 (r)
2018	Éire Óg	0-09	Palatine	0-05
2019	Éire Óg	1-16	Palatine	0-05
2020	Éire Óg	0-15	Rathvilly	0-09
2021	Rathvilly	2-12	Éire Óg	1-10
2022	Palatine	2-08	Tinryland	2-06
2023	Éire Óg	2-13	Tinryland	0-07
2024	Rathvilly	2-07, 2-10 (r)	Palatine	1-10, 0-11 (r)
2025	Old Leighlin	1-11	Rathvilly	0-13
2026	Rathvilly	0-14	Old Leighlin	1-08

== Roll of honour ==
=== By club ===
#	Club	Titles	Championships won
1	Éire Óg	31	1960, 1962, 1965, 1967, 1968, 1969, 1974, 1976, 1977, 1978, 1980, 1982, 1984, 1987, 1988, 1989, 1992, 1993, 1994, 1995, 1996, 1998, 2005, 2007, 2008, 2012, 2017, 2018, 2019, 2020, 2023
2	O'Hanrahans (formerly Carlow and Carlow Barrow Rangers)	18	1890, 1903, 1927, 1928, 1930, 1931, 1932, 1937, 1942, 1945, 1951, 1954, 1958, 1961, 1999, 2000, 2001, 2003
3	Tinryland	15	1934, 1936, 1939, 1940, 1943, 1944, 1946, 1948, 1949, 1950, 1971, 1972, 1975, 1979, 1981
4	Graiguecullen	13	1908, 1909, 1910, 1912, 1913, 1914, 1915, 1918, 1921, 1922, 1923, 1924, 1925
5	Rathvilly	11	1983, 1985, 1990, 1991, 2002, 2004, 2009, 2014, 2021, 2024, 2026
6	St Patrick's, Tullow (formerly Loughmartin and simply Tullow)	10	1898, 1899, 1900, 1901, 1902, 1904, 1916, 1959, 1963, 1964
7	Palatine	7	1919, 1920, 1952, 2006, 2015, 2016, 2022
8	Old Leighlin	5	1997, 2010, 2011, 2013, 2025
9	Kildavin-Clonegal	3	1966, 1970, 1973
9	Mount Leinster Rangers (then St Carthages/Borris)	3	1911, 1947, 1953
11	Clonmore	2	1955, 1956
11	Leighlinbridge	2	1929, 1957
11	Milford	2	1926, 1933
12	Kilbride	1	1935
12	Na Coilig Troidhe	1	1938
12	Naomh Eoin	1	1986
