= Palatine GAA =

Gaelic Athletic Association club in Bennekerry, County Carlow, Ireland

Palatine
- Cnoc Arda
- Founded: 1909
- County: Carlow
- Colours: Red with a green sash
- Grounds: Bennekerry

Playing kits
Standard colours

Senior Club Championships
	All Ireland	Leinster champions	Carlow champions
Football:	0	0	7
Hurling:	0	0	1

Palatine GAA is a Gaelic Athletic Association club based in Bennekerry, County Carlow in Ireland. It draws players mainly from the parish of Bennekerry, including the townlands of Brownshill, Ducketsgrove, Kernanstown, Russellstown and Palatine, County Carlow.

The club was founded in 1909 and has won seven Carlow Senior Football Championships and one Carlow Senior Hurling Championship in its history.

== Football ==
=== Formation and early history ===
Football was being played in the Palatine area almost 20 years before the present Palatine GAA club was founded. The original team was Ballyhade Slashers, and though Ballyhade is in neighbouring County Kildare, they were allowed to compete in Carlow. Another club named Ardnehue folded in 1905.

The current Palatine club was founded in 1909, and their first match on record is a 0–17 to 0–3 defeat to Carlow Graigue. They won their first championship in 1913; the Carlow Junior Championship.

They won their first Carlow Senior championship in 1919 and retained it a year later. Their 1919 victory was over Graiguecullen in a replay, after a scoreless draw. The replay was won 1–1 to 0–2. In the 1920 Leinster Championship, the Carlow team that defeated Wicklow 3–2 to 1–7 contained 10 Palatine players, including captain John Sweeney. Later that year Palatine defeated neighbours Tinryland 1–1 to 0–0 in Graiguecullen to retain the championship. They thus experienced the rare feat of winning two Senior Championships in the same calendar year, as the 1919 final had been played on 25 January 1920.

=== Third Senior Championship, 1920 to 1952 ===
When Carlow won the Leinster Junior Championship in 1923, Palatine players Ed "Sonny" Wall, Matt Hanely and Tom Dillon were in the team, with Jack Scully, Lar Sweeney and Mike Delaney among the subs.

After relegation to Junior level following a dispute with the County Board (following a game with Milford in the early 1930s), Palatine won the Carlow Junior championship in 1936 and the Intermediate championship in 1938. They were re-graded back down to Intermediate again for the 1940 season, and won that title once more in 1948, returning to Senior. Much of the team that won promotion from Intermediate would go on to win the Senior championship in 1952. They beat Ballymurphy in the final. This team also lost to Tinryland in the 1950 final and to Ballymurphy in 1953. They did, however, also win Senior Football Leagues in 1950, 1952, 1953 and 1954.

Billy "Skinner" McGuill captained the 1952 team, and he also captained the Carlow county team for the following season. Carlow beat both the reigning All Ireland champions and the beaten finalists (Kerry and Armagh respectively) to reach the 1954 National League final, only to lose to Mayo.

=== 1952 to 2006 ===
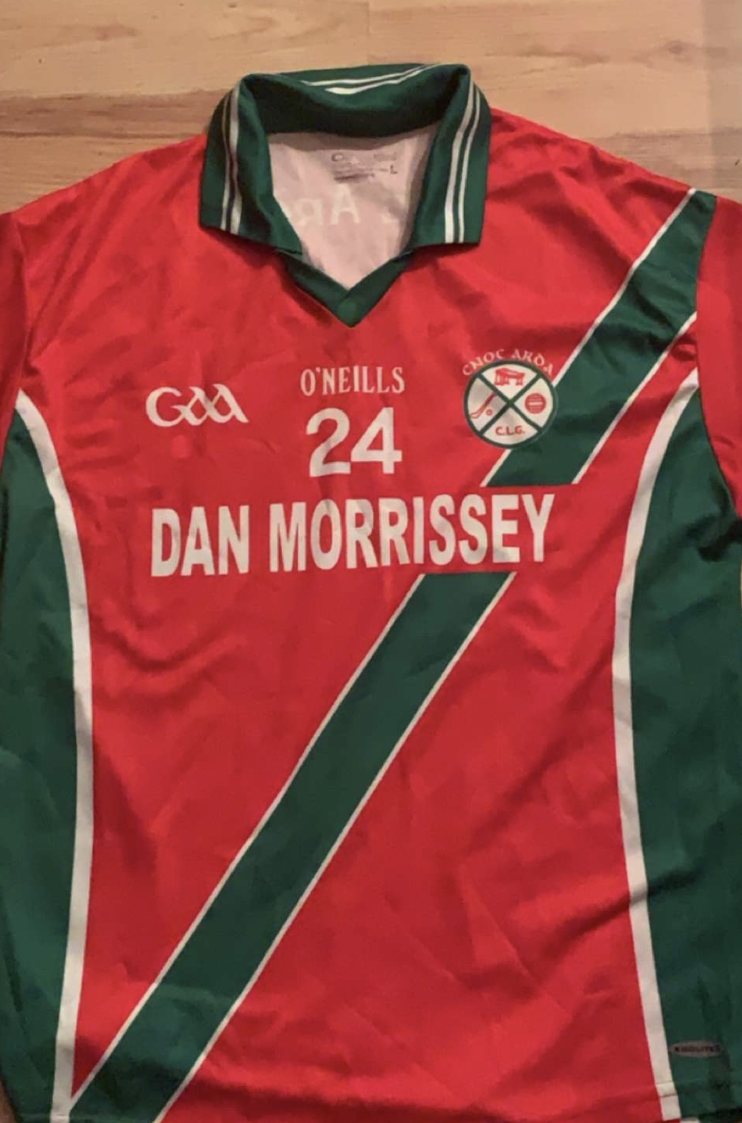
Palatine jersey

After defeating Ballymurphy in the 1952 final (0-6 to 0–4 in a replay, after the first game ended 0–6 to 1-3), Palatine went 54 years without winning a Carlow county championship, losing several finals before re-capturing the championship in 2006. Among those losses were a defeat to Ballymurphy in 1953 (missing out on the chance to become the last team to hold that trophy, as a new one was commissioned the following season), to Kildavin in 1970, to Naomh Eoin in 1986, to Old Leighlin in 1997, O'Hanrahans in 2001, and Rathvilly (after a replay) in 2002.

Even though success in the Senior Football Championship eluded them, in 1971 Palatine captured a football and hurling double at Under 21 level. There was another football and hurling double in 1985, this time at Intermediate level.

After many close-calls in county finals, Palatine finally won their fourth Senior Football Championship after a 54-year wait, defeating Kildavin-Clonegal in the 2006 final by 1–9 to 0–11. Palatine led early on in the game, thanks in large part to a goal from Paul Reid. However, Kildavin-Clonegal had much the better of the play in the 2nd half and with a few minutes to go they led by three points. With the game entering its final stages, a comeback from Palatine culminated with midfielder Brian Farrell pointing from a '45 deep into injury time to secure victory for Palatine. Paul Reid was later named club player of the year for Palatine, and Joe Byrne was named player of the year by the Carlow county board.

In their first ever foray into the Leinster club championship, Palatine were defeated by Rhode of Offaly, 2–7 to 1–11. After a fractious game, Westmeath referee Peter Fox was struck by a Palatine supporter who subsequently received a lifetime ban from the GAA.

=== 2007 to present ===
Buoyed by back-to-back Minor Championship successes in 2008 and 2009 (the first time such a two-in-a-row had been achieved alone, though a Palatine-Tinryland combination had won Minor Championships in 1975 and 1976 as "Pal/St Josephs"), Palatine remained competitive into the decade following their 2006 win. However their next three appearances in Senior championship finals resulted in defeats by Éire Óg.

In 2007, aiming for a second ever two-in-a-row, they drew 0–10 to 1–7 with their town rivals, with Simon Rea kicking a late free to secure a replay for Éire Óg. The town team won the replay easily, 4–9 to 1–9. It was a similar story in 2008, with Palatine in a position to win the first day, before eventually losing in a replay. It finished 1-10 apiece in the first game, with Éire Óg coming out on top the next day, 2–9 to 0–11.

In the 2012 final, Palatine were never really in the game, losing 0–15 to 0–5.

Palatine won back-to-back championships for the second time ever in 2015 and 2016. In 2015, they defeated Old Leighlin 2–12 to 2–8 in the final.

In the first round of the Leinster club championship, they were beaten by Laois champions Portlaoise, 0–15 to 1–9.

In the 2016 county final, they defeated Rathvilly 2–13 to 0–12. In winning that day, Palatine became the last county champions ever to lift the Conlon Cup. (In 2017, a new trophy was commissioned). In the 2016 Leinster Club championship, they were defeated by Dublin champions St. Vincents, 0–16 to 0–8. Palatine lost their county championship when Eire Og defeated them in the 2017 semi-final.

The town team who again got the better of them in 2018, when they defeated them in the county final. While the teams were all square at the break in the 2018 final, at 0-4 apiece, Eire Og had the better of the second half and ultimately won by 0–9 to 0–5.

Eire Óg beat Palatine in a county final yet again in 2019, this time on a scoreline of 1–16 to 0–5. Since winning the county championship in 2006 for the first time in 54 years, Palatine have lost 5 county finals, all to Eire Og. 2 of those were in replays. (They have, however, won two county finals in that period, against Old Leighlin and Rathvilly).

Palatine won their seventh Senior Championship in 2022, beating Tinryland in the final, 2-8 to 2-6. They had to survive a late Tinryland comeback to do so, having led comfortably for most of the game. Three weeks later, they won a game in the Leinster Club Football Championship for the first time, defeating St Patrick's of Wicklow on a scoreline of 2-14 to 0-8. They were subsequently defeated by Portarlington.

In 2023, they survived a relegation playoff against Fenagh, but were back in the county final again in 2024, where they were beaten by Rathvilly after a replay.

== Hurling ==
There is also a history of hurling being played sporadically at Palatine. Hurling was first played competitively at the club in 1963 and Palatine won a Junior Hurling Championship in 1965, before winning their sole Senior championship in 1972. They defeated Ballinkillen by 4–9 to 0–18.

A Junior Hurling Championship was captured in 1983, and an Intermediate one in 1985. Then - after the club took a break from hurling altogether for several years - in 2001 Willie Cullen captained Palatine to another Junior Hurling Championship at the age of 52. He also scored 1–4 on the day. Cullen was also top scorer in the entire country in 1978/79 National Football League, and has won an adult championship medal in five different decades from the 1960s to the 2000s

== Honours ==
Football

- Carlow Senior Football Championship: (7) 1919, 1920, 1952, 2006, 2015, 2016, 2022
- Carlow Intermediate Football Championship: (3) 1938, 1979, 1985
- Carlow Junior Football Championship: (4) 1936, 1948, 1965, 2010
- Carlow Under 21 Football Championship: (2) 1971, 1996^
- Carlow Minor Football Championship: (7) 1975^^, 1976^^, 1983^^, 2008, 2009, 2015, 2024

^As Palatine-Askea ^^As Pal-St Josephs

Hurling

- Carlow Senior Hurling Championship: (1) 1972
- Carlow Intermediate Hurling Championship: (1) 1985
- Carlow Junior Hurling Championship: (6) 1965, 1970, 1983, 1990, 2001, 2013
- Carlow Under 21 Hurling Championship: (1) 1971
- Carlow Minor Hurling Championship: (3) 1967, 1968, 1970
