= Rathvilly GAA =

Gaelic football club in County Carlow, Ireland

Rathvilly
- Rathbhile
- Founded: 1888
- County: Carlow
- Colours: Green, Gold and White
- Grounds: Fr. Ryan Park, Rathvilly
- Coordinates: 52°52′44″N 6°41′46″W

Playing kits
Standard colours

Senior Club Championships
	All Ireland	Leinster champions	Carlow champions
Football:	-	-	11

Rathvilly Gaelic Athletic Association is a Gaelic football and ladies' Gaelic football club based in Rathvilly, County Carlow, Ireland.

== History ==
The club was founded in 1888. The teacher Edward O'Toole was the first captain of the club; he was a member of the Irish Republican Brotherhood (IRB) and an early influence on Kevin Barry. Rathvilly won its first Carlow Junior Football Championship in 1916. In 1979 Rathvilly were promoted to the Carlow Senior Football Championship In 1983 they founded their juvenile section and won their first county championship; since then, they have won eight more.

Rathvilly play at Fr. Ryan Park; in 2019, they received a €14,455 grant for floodlights.

The club crest displays the motto bene cultō nīl ōrnātiu[s]. This is Latin for "well cultivated, not ornate," and is derived from Cicero's Cato Maior de Senectute: agro bene culto nihil potest esse nec usu uberius nec specie ornatius ("nothing can be more bountiful for use, or more ornate to the eye, than a well-cultivated farm"). It also displays images of Saint Patrick, Rathvilly Moat, St. Patrick's Church and Rathvilly Bridge over the River Slaney.

== Honours ==
=== Gaelic football ===
- Carlow Senior Football Championship (11): 1983, 1985, 1990, 1991, 2002, 2004, 2009, 2014, 2021, 2024, 2026
- Carlow Intermediate Football Championship (2): 1973, 1978
- Carlow Under-21 Football Championship (7): 1981, 1982, 1990, 1992, 1993, 2005, 2007
- Carlow Minor Football Championship (5): 1982, 1988, 1990, 1993, 2004
- Carlow Junior "A" Football Championship (7): 1916, 1967, 1984, 1989, 2004, 2009, 2013
- Carlow Junior "B" Football Championship (1)
- Carlow Junior Ladies Football Championship (1): 2015

== Notable players ==
- Brendan Murphy
- J. J. Smith
- Casey Dunne
