= Éire Óg GAA (Carlow) =

Gaelic games club in County Carlow, Ireland

Éire Óg
- CLG Éire Óg
- Founded: 1956
- County: Carlow
- Nickname: The YI's
- Colours: Red and White
- Grounds: Páirc Uí Bhrian
- Coordinates: 52°49′49″N 6°55′02″W

Playing kits
Standard colours

Senior Club Championships
	All Ireland	Leinster champions	Carlow champions
Football:	-	5	31

Éire Óg are a GAA club based in Carlow town. The club are solely involved in the sport of gaelic football, fielding teams across all underage categories as well as adult competitions. Formed in 1958, the club has enjoyed tremendous success on the field and are one of the most successful clubs in the history of Carlow GAA. They have won the Carlow Senior Football Championship 31 times, the Leinster Senior Club Football Championship 5 times and were All-Ireland Senior Club Football Championship runners up in 1993 and 1996. In November 2024, it was announced that former players Richard Mahon and Cormac Mullins would be taken over the Eire Og senior team for the upcoming 2025 season.

== History ==
=== Honours ===
- Carlow Senior Football Championship 31: 1960, 1962, 1965, 1967, 1968, 1969, 1974, 1976, 1977, 1978, 1980, 1982, 1984, 1987, 1988, 1989, 1992, 1993, 1994, 1995, 1996, 1998, 2005, 2007, 2008, 2012 2017, 2018, 2019, 2020, 2023
- Leinster Senior Club Football Championship 5: 1992-93, 1993–94, 1995–96, 1996–97, 1998–99
- All-Ireland Senior Club Football Championship Runners up: 1993, 1996

== Notable players ==
- Vinny Harvey
- Leo Turley
- Charlie Ellis
