= O'Hanrahans GFC =

Gaelic games club in County Carlow, Ireland

O'Hanrahans
- Uí hAnnracháin
- Founded: 1919
- County: Carlow
- Nickname: The Blues
- Colours: Blue and White
- Grounds: Dublin Road
- Coordinates: 52.846646°N 6.913154°W

Playing kits
Standard colours

Senior Club Championships
	All Ireland	Leinster champions	Carlow champions
Football:	-	1	18

O'Hanrahans are a Gaelic football club from Carlow, County Carlow. They are one of the most successful clubs in the history of Carlow GAA. They have won the Carlow Senior Football Championship 18 times and the Leinster Senior Club Football Championship once.

== History ==
The club was established in 1919 and named after Michael O'Hanrahan. Though born in Wexford, O'Hanrahan was educated by the Christian Brothers in Carlow and attended what is now St Patrick's College in Carlow town. He was executed in Kilmainham Gaol for his part in the Easter Rising.

They play their home games on the Dublin Road in Carlow town, in grounds directly east of Dr. Cullen Park.

While encountering periods of success during the 1920s, 30s, 40s and 50s, by far their greatest period of sustained success came in the period 1997–2003, under the management of Laois man Mick Dempsey. Dempsey later went on to become part of Brian Cody's highly successful management set-up with the Kilkenny hurling team.

In 1997 they won the Intermediate Championship. In 1998 they came close to beating their fierce rivals Eire Og in the Senior Championship semi-final. Eire Og subsequently went on to win their 5th Leinster Club Championship in 7 years. 1999 saw the Blues win their first county championship in 38 years, the first of three-in-a-row, and four in five years.

The following year they progressed through the Leinster club championship all the way to the final, where they defeated heavy favourites Na Fianna in Portlaosie. The following February they pushed Nemo Rangers close in Clonmel in the All Ireland semi-final.

After winning the county championship in 2003 (their fourth in five years) their fortunes took a slide, and they have not returned to the county final since 2005.

The Leinster winning team was something of a golden generation for The Blues, with as many as 13 of the team playing on the same county-winning Minor team in 1996. It included some all-time greats of Carlow football, including John Brennan, Andrew Corden and Mark Carpenter. Other great players from previous generations have been honoured, including when Carlow GAA announced its football XV of the 20th Century: the full-forward line was made up entirely of O'Hanrahans players - Jimma Rea (part of Carlow's 1944 Leinster Championship winning team), Ned Doogue and Eamonn Long.

The 2020s has been a decade of decline so far for O'Hanrahans. They dropped out of Senior In 2021, suffered back-to-back relegations in 2022 going down to Junior and in 2025 'The Blues' hit a new low being relegated to Junior B with an embarrassing loss (2-10 to 0-02) to the Naomh Moling footballers in the relegation final in Myshall. O'Hanrahans relegation to the Junior B comes 25 years after their historic Leinster Championship victory against Na Fianna of Dublin in 2000. The decline of 'The Blues' in the last quarter of a century is up there with that of any club in Ireland.

== Honours ==
- Carlow Senior Football Championships: (18) 1890, 1903, 1927, 1928, 1930, 1931, 1932, 1937, 1942, 1945, 1951, 1954, 1958, 1961, 1999, 2000, 2001, 2003
- Leinster Senior Club Football Championship: (1) 2000

O'Hanrahans have also won four u21 Football Championships, 21 Minor Football Championships, three Intermediate Football Championships, and three Junior A Football Championships.
