= 2023–24 All-Ireland Junior Club Hurling Championship =

Gaelic sports event in Ireland

Championship Details
- Dates: 28 October 2023 – 13 January 2024
- Teams: 32

All Ireland Champions
- Winners: Tullogher–Rosbercon (1st win)
- Captain: Colman O'Sullivan
- Manager: Michael Doyle

All Ireland Runners-up
- Runners-up: St Catherine's
- Captain: Eoin O'Riordan
- Manager: Denis Walsh

Provincial Champions
- Munster: St Catherine's
- Leinster: Tullogher–Rosbercon
- Ulster: Castleblayney
- Connacht: Easkey

Championship Statistics
- Matches Played: 31
- Total Goals: 103 (3.32 per game)
- Total Points: 881 (28.41 per game)
- Top Scorer: Cian O'Donoghue (3-52)

The 2023–24 All-Ireland Junior Club Hurling Championship was the 20th staging of the All-Ireland Junior Club Hurling Championship, the Gaelic Athletic Association's junior inter-county club hurling tournament. The draws for the respective provincial championships took place at various stages. The championship ran from 28 October 2023 to 13 January 2024.

The All-Ireland final was played on 13 January 2024 at Croke Park in Dublin, between Tullogher–Rosbercon from Kilkenny and St Catherine's from Cork, in what was their first ever meeting in the final. Tullogher-Rosbercon won the match by 2–27 to 1–13 to claim their first ever All-Ireland title.

Tullogher-Rosbercon's Cian O'Donoghue was the championship's top scorer with 3-52.

== Team summaries ==
Team	County	Most recent success		
Team	County	All-Ireland	Provincial	County
Amsterdam	Europe			2022
Ardmore	Waterford	2018	2017	2022
Ballinahinch	Tipperary			2022
Ballinasloe	Galway			
Banner	Clare			
Carrick HC	Leitrim		2018	2022
Carrig–Riverstown	Offaly			
Castleblayney	Longford			2022
Clonguish Gaels	Longford			2022
Colt-Shanahoe	Laois			
Cootehill Celtic	Cavan			2022
Craanford Fr O'Regan's	Wexford			
Easkey	Sligo		2022	2022
Erne Gaels, Belleek	Fermanagh			
Feenagh–Kilmeedy	Limerick			2013
Good Counsel–Liffey Gaels	Dublin			
Kilclief	Down			
Kildavin/Clonegal	Carlow			
Killeavy St Moninna's	Armagh			
Leixlip	Kildare			
Navan O'Mahonys	Meath			2017
Omagh St Enda's	Tyrone			
Sean Treacys	London			2020
St Brigid's	Westmeath			2014
St Brigid's, Cloughmills	Antrim			2010
St Catherine's	Cork			2017
St Eunan's	Donegal			
St Fechin's	Kerry			2022
St Patrick's	Wicklow			
Swatragh	Derry			
Tralee Parnells	Kerry			
Tullogher–Rosbercon	Kilkenny		2008	2008

== Connacht Junior Club Hurling Championship ==
=== Connacht semi-final ===
4 November 2023 Semi-final	Carrick HC (Leitrim)	1-08 - 2-20	Easkey (Sligo)	Avant Money Páirc Seán Mac Diarmada
	S Golden 1-0, S O'Riordan 0-3, D Kane 0-1, B Goldrick 0-1, J McNabola 0-1, C McLoughlin 0-1, D Moreton 0-1.	Report	A Kilcullen 0-13, T Cawley 2-2, J McHugh 0-2, F Connolly 0-1, M Gordon 0-1, F Moylan 0-1.

=== Connacht final ===
25 November 2023 Final	Ballinasloe (Galway)	2-12 - 1-18	Easkey (Sligo)	Connacht GAA Centre
	C O’Hanlon (0-7 7f), C Keighery (1-0), E Hayes (1-0), J Coughlan (0-2), J Dillon (0-1), M Fogarty (0-1).	Report	A Kilcullen (1-11 10f ‘65), F Cawley (0-3), T Cawley (0-2), J McHugh (0-1), R McHugh (0-1).	Referee: J Judge (Mayo)

== Leinster Junior Club Hurling Championship ==
=== Leinster round 1 ===
28 October 2023 Round 1	Colt–Shanahoe (Laois)	1-13 - 0-09	Amsterdam (Europe)	LOETB Centre of Excellence
	M O'Connor 1-3, N Dunne 0-5, J Hickey 0-2, P McDonald 0-1, D Cuddy 0-1, B McDonald 0-1.		G McDermott 0-6, A O'Mahoney 0-2, L Ryan 0-1.	Referee: K Waters (Offaly)

28 October 2023 Round 1	Tullogher–Rosbercon (Kilkenny)	6-19 - 1-07	St Patrick's (Wicklow)	Carlow IT grounds
	C O’Donoghue (1-8, 0-5 frees, 0-2 65); D Glennon (3-1); M Murphy, W Walsh (1-3 each); J Shiely (0-2); C Hennessy, M Handrick (0-1 each).	Report	A O’Brien (1-5, 0-4 frees); P Murphy, G O’Brien (0-1 each).

28 October 2023 Round 1	St Fechin's (Louth)	2-14 - 0-06	Clonguish Gaels (Longford)	Darver Centre of Excellence
	S Conneely (2-1); P Lynch (0-6, 2f), R Berkery (0-2), D Stephenson (0-2), P Mathews (0-1), D Ryan (0-1), S Hodgins (0-1).	Report	J O’Brien (0-3, 3f), G Moore (0-1), S Gregg (0-1), M Flynn (0-1).

28 October 2023 Round 1	Carrig & Riverstown (Offaly)	2-20 - 0-08	St Brigid's (Westmeath)	Grant Heating St Brendan's Park
	L Hogan (1-5, 0-3 frees, 0-1 '65'), C King (0-4), D Egan (0-3), P King (1-0), C McDowall, B Hoctor (one free), J Hoctor (0-2 each), L Hoare (free), J Hanlon (0-1 each).	Report	C Slevin (0-6, 0-5 frees), S Quinn, B Brophy (0-1 each).

28 October 2023 Round 1	Leixlip (Kildare)	3-17 - 0-11	Navan O'Mahonys (Meath)	Conneff Park
	D Melville 1-13, S Ryan 1-1, B Travers 1-0, S McManus 0-1, J Roche 0-1, T Seale 0-1.	Report	D Connell (0-5), J Walsh (0-3), F Malone (0-2), C Keyes (0-1).

=== Leinster quarter-finals ===
11 November 2023 Quarter-final	Colt–Shanahoe (Laois)	1-01 - 5-26	Tullogher–Rosbercon (Kilkenny)	LOETB Centre of Excellence
	J Hickey (1-0), N Dunne (0-1).	Report	C Hennessy (2-7); W Walsh (2-6); C O’Donoghue (0-6, 0-2 frees, 0-1 65); C O’Sullivan (1-2); J Shiely (0-3); L Murphy, M Handrick (0-1 each).

11 November 2023 Quarter-final	Craanford Fr O'Regan's (Wexford)	7-25 - 0-05	Kildavin/Clonegal (Carlow)	St Patrick's Park
	J Byrne (1-9, 0-6 frees), J Conroy (2-2), M Nolan (2-1), K Hyland (1-1); O Doran (0-4); A Kavanagh (1-0), K Poole (0-3), B Tobin (0-2), E Doyle (0-1); P Kavanagh (0-1), E Doran (0-1).	Report	P Ryan (0-4, 2 frees), R Sinnott (0-1).

11 November 2023 Quarter-final	St Fechin's (Louth)	4-14 - 3-19	Leixlip (Kildare)	Darver Centre of Excellence
	P Mathews 2-2, P Lynch 0-6 (5f), S Kerrisk 1-2; S Conneely 1-0, D Stephenson 0-3 (3f), D Morgan 0-1.	Report	D Melville 1-8 (4f), C Keegan 2-3, J Travers 0-3, C Burke 0-1; J Canning 0-1, J Roche 0-1; B Travers 0-1, A Murphy 0-1.

11 November 2023 Quarter-final	Carrig & Riverstown (Offaly)	1-20 - 3-11	Good Counsel–Liffey Gaels (Dublin)	Faithful Fields
	L Hogan (0-8, 0-5 frees), B Hoctor (0-6, 0-2 frees, 0-1 '65'), P King (0-3), C McDowall (1-0), C King, P Bergin, L Hoare (free) (0-1 each).	Report	C Scahill (0-9, 0-7 frees), S Ryan (2-0), L Blood (1-1), B O'Reilly (0-1).

=== Leinster semi-finals ===
25 November 2023 Semi-final	Craanford Fr O'Regan's (Wexford)	0-18 - 2-17	Tullogher–Rosbercon (Kilkenny)	St Patrick's Park
	Jason Byrne (0-13, 12 frees), Ollie Doran (0-3); Kevin Poole (0-1), Brendan Tobin (0-1)	Report	Cian O’Donoghue (0-12, 7 frees, 1 ’65), Walter Walsh (1-2, 1-0 pen.), Danny Glennon (1-1), Jason Shiely (0-1); Conor Hennessy (0-1),

26 November 2023 Semi-final	Carrig & Riverstown (Offaly)	4-14 - 3-08	Leixlip (Kildare)	St Brendan's Park
	Lee Hogan (0-8, 0-7 frees), Cathal King (2-1), Conor McDowall (2-0), Joe Hoctor (0-2), Brendan Hoctor (0-1,0-1 free), Liam Hoare (0-1, 0-1 free), David Egan (0-1)	Report	Darragh Melville (0-5, 0-1 frees), John Roche (1-2, 1-2 frees), Cormac Keegan (0-1), Alan Murphy (1-0), Ben Travers 0-1

=== Leinster final ===
9 December 2023 Final	Carrig & Riverstown (Offaly)	0-08 - 2-14	Tullogher–Rosbercon (Kilkenny)	Glenisk O'Connor Park
	B Hoctor 0-4 (4f), L Hogan 0-2 (2f), P King and J Hoctor 0-1 each.	Report	C O'Donoghue 0-7 (5f, 1'65' and 1 sideline), M Murphy 1-3, W Walsh 1-1, C Hennessy 0-2, D Glennon 0-1.

== Munster Junior Club Hurling Championship ==
=== Munster quarter-finals ===
4 November 2023 Quarter-final	Ardmore (Waterford)	1-11 - 2-16	St Catherine's (Cork)	Fraher Field
	S Keating 0-9f, J Flavin 1-0, C Keating, K Murphy 0-1 each.	Report	S O’Donoghue 0-7f, B Mulcahy 1-2, E Davis 0-4f, M Mulcahy 1-1, R Galvin, K Barry 0-1 each.	Referee: J Mullins (Clare)

4 November 2023 Quarter-final	Tralee Parnells (Kerry)	0-10 - 1-10	Banner (Clare)	John Mitchels GAA Grounds
	G Doherty (0-5, all frees), D Reen (0-3), O O’Brien 1f) and M Madden (0-1 each)	Report	S Meehan (1-8, 1-0 Pen, 0-6fs, 1’65), T Meenaghan and O McMahon (0-1 each)

=== Munster semi-finals ===
18 November 2023 Semi-final	Banner (Clare)	0-16 - 0-20	Feenagh–Kilmeedy (Limerick)	Cusack Park
	N Walsh 0-7 (0-5 frees), S Meehan 0-4 (0-1 free), F Hayes 0-3, T Meenaghan and S McMahon 0-1 each.	Report	D Coleman 0-13 (0-8 frees), J O'Gorman, M Fitzgibbon and R O'Connor 0-2 each, L Ryan 0-1.

18 November 2023 Semi-final	St Catherine's (Cork)	2-17 - 0-11	Ballinahinch (Tipperary)	Páirc Uí Rinn
	M Mulcahy 1-4, B Mulcahy 1-1, S O’Donoghue 0-4 (0-3f, 0-1 65), E Davis 0-3f, R Galvain, W Leamy, K Wallace, K Barry, A Neville 0-1 each.	Report	B Ryan 0-5 (0-4f), J Kelly 0-2, J Foley, A Kelly, K Kelly (0-1f), S McGrath (0-1f) 0-1 each.

=== Munster final ===
2 December 2023 Final	St Catherine's (Cork)	2-14 - 1-15	Feenagh–Kilmeedy (Limerick)	Mallow GAA Complex
	S O’Donoghue 0-9 (0-5f), E Condon 2-0, E Davis (0-1f), K Wallace, K O’Donoghue, B Mulcahy, K Barry 0-1 each.	Report	D Coleman 0-10 (0-9f), R O’Connor 1-0, D Boyce 0-2, M Fitzgibbon, L Ryan, S Kelly 0-1 each.	Referee: N O'Toole (Waterford)

== Ulster Junior Club Hurling Championship ==
=== Ulster preliminary round ===
29 October 2023 Preliminary round	Cootehill Celtic (Cavan)	1-09 - 1-07	Killeavy St Moninna's (Armagh)	Kingspan Breffni Park
	R Delaney 1-2, T Leonard 0-3, D Carney 0-3, F Hughes 0-1.	Report

=== Ulster quarter-finals ===
4 November 2023 Quarter-final	St Eunan's (Donegal)	4-24 - 0-09	Omagh St Enda's (Tyrone)	O'Donnell Park
	D Ó Maoiléidigh 1-5,4f; K Kealy 1-4; P Kelly 1-2; S McVeigh 0-5; M Ahern 1-0; B McIntyre 0-2; R Hilferty 0-2; F Delaney 0-2; C O’Brien 0-1, L Forde 0-1.	Report	M Corry 0-7,5f,1 '45; F Corry 0-1, P O’Grady 0-1.

4 November 2023 Quarter-final	St Brigid's, Cloughmills (Antrim)	2-09 - 1-15	Castleblayney (Monaghan)	Fr McGuigan Park
	L Kearns (1-0), C Blair (1-0), E Dobbin (0-3), M Devlin (0-2), C Butler (0-1), M Dobbin (0-1), S Smith (0-1), J Doherty (0-1).	Report	L Moloney (0-8, 8f), D Hughes (1-1), T Hughes (0-3), N Garland (0-2), B McGuigan (0-1), M Treanor (0-1).

4 November 2023 Quarter-final	Erne Gaels, Belleek (Fermanagh)	0-05 - 4-17	Cootehill Celtic (Cavan)	Fr Tierney Park
	C Daly (0-2, 0-1 free), U O’Reilly (0-2).	Report	G Fitzpatrick (1-3), R Delaney, (1-3), M Moffett (0-5, 0-3 frees); C Bannon (1-1); D Adams (1-1), B Brennan (1-1), P McCabe (0-2), D Carney (0-1).

4 November 2023 Quarter-final	Swatragh (Derry)	4-21 - 0-10	Kilclief (Down)	Owenbeg Centre of Excellence
	S Walsh (1-8, 0-6 frees, 1 65), F McGurk (2-4), C Murray (1-3), J Friel (0-3), D Bradley (0-2), T Walsh (0-1).	Report	S McGrattan (0-4 frees); F McFall (0-3), F Conway (0-3).

=== Ulster semi-finals ===
11 November 2023 Semi-final	Swatragh (Derry)	0-21 - 0-21; Penalties: 4-5	St Eunan's (Donegal)	O'Neill Park
	S Walsh 0-6,6f; C Murray 0-5,2f; F McGurk 0-3; J Friel 0-3; T Walsh 0-2; E McGuckin 0-1; M McCormack 0-1;	Report	D Ó Maoiléidigh 0-10,10f; S McVeigh 0-3; C O’Brien 0-3,3f; K Kealy 0-2; P Kelly 0-1; B McIntyre 0-1; R Hilferty 0-1.

12 November 2023 Semi-final	Castleblayney (Monaghan)	2-19 - 1-05	Cootehill Celtic (Cavan)	St Oliver Plunkett Park
	L Moloney 1-8, T Hughes 1-2, D Hughes 0-3, B McGuigan 0-2, C McHugh 0-2, N Garland 0-2.	Report	R Delaney 1-0, D Carney 0-2, G Fitzpatrick 0-1, T Leonard 0-1, M Moffett 0-1.

=== Ulster final ===
19 November 2023 Final	St Eunan's (Donegal)	1-15 - 2-16	Castleblayney (Monaghan)	Donaghmore Road
	P Kelly 0-6,6f; F Delaney 1-1; C O’Brien 0-3,3f; B MacIntyre 0-3; M Ahern 0-1; R Hilferty 0-1.	Report	T Hughes 1-4; F Rafter 1-3; L Maloney 0-4,4f; C McHugh 0-2; D Hughes 0-2; B McGuigan 0-1.

== All-Ireland Junior Club Hurling Championship ==
Quarter-Finals
Sean Tracey’s (London)	3-18
Castleblayney (Monaghan)	5-24

Semi-Finals
Castleblayney (Monaghan)
Tullogher-Rosbercon (Kilkenny)
Easkey (Sligo)
St Catherine's (Cork)

Final
St Catherine's (Cork)

=== All-Ireland quarter-final ===
3 December 2023 Quarter-final	Seán Treacy's (London)	3-18 - 5-24 (aet)	Castleblayney (Monaghan)	McGovern Park
		Report	L Moloney 1-17 (1-16 frees); T Hughes 3-2; B McGuigan 1-0; F Rafter 0-1 (sideline); D Hughes 0-1; C McNally 0-1; B Flanagan 0-1; N Garland 0-1

=== All-Ireland semi-finals ===
16 December 2023 Semi-final	Easkey (Sligo)	0-11 - 0-12	St Catherine's (Cork)	Duggan Park
	A Kilcullen 0-5 (1 sideline, 3 frees), F Cawley 0-3, M Gordon 0-1, R McHugh 0-1, A Rolston 0-1.	Report	S O’Donoghue 0-3 (2 frees), K Wallace 0-3, M Mulcahy 0-2, E Condon 0-2, B Mulcahy 0-1, E Davis 0-1 free.	Referee: P Owens (Down)

17 December 2023 Semi-final	Castleblayney (Monaghan)	1-11 - 3-20	Tullogher–Rosbercon (Kilkenny)	The Downs GAA Grounds
	F Rafter 1-1, L Moloney 0-3, M Treanor 0-2, N Garland 0-2, T Hughes 0-1, B McGuigan 0-1, S Hughes 0-1.	Report	C O'Donoghue 2-9, C Hennessy 1-2, W Walsh 0-3, J Lyng 0-2, M Murphy 0-2, D Glennon 0-1, P Hartley 0-1.	Referee: B Keon

=== All-Ireland final ===
13 January 2024 Final	St Catherine's (Cork)	1-13 - 2-21	Tullogher–Rosbercon (Kilkenny)	Croke Park
	R Galvin (1-1), E Davis (0-4 frees), S O’Donoghue (0-3 frees), K Wallace, B Mulcahy, K O’Donoghue, O Fitzgerald, C Hegarty (0-1 each).	Report	C O’Donoghue (0-10, 0-6 frees, 0-1sl), W Walsh (1-3), M Murphy (1-1), C Hennessy (0-4), C O’Sullivan, J Shiely and D Glennon (0-1 each).	Referee: C McDonald (Antrim)

== Championship statistics ==
=== Top scorers ===
Overall

Rank	Player	Club	Tally	Total	Matches	Average
1	Cian O'Donoghue	Tulllogher–Rosbercon	3-52	61	6	10.16
2	Leo Moloney	Castleblayney	2-40	46	5	9.20
3	Walter Walsh	Tulllogher–Rosbercon	6-18	36	6	6.00
4	Darragh Melville	Leixlip	2-26	32	3	10.67
4	Andrew Kilcullen	Easkey	1-29	32	3	10.66
6	Thomas Hughes	Castleblayney	5-12	27	5	5.40
7	Lee Hogan	Carrig & Riverstown	1-23	26	4	6.50
7	Seán O'Donoghue	St Catherine's	0-26	26	5	5.20
9	Jason Byrne	Craanford Fr O'Regan's GAA	1-22	25	2	12.50
10	Diarmuid Coleman	Feenagh–Kilmeedy	0-23	23	2	11.50

In a single game

Rank	Player	Club	Tally	Total	Opposition
1	Leo Moloney	Castleblayney	1-17	20	Seán Treacy's
2	Darragh Melville	Leixlip	1-13	16	Navan O'Mahonys
3	Cian O'Donoghue	Tullogher-Rosbercon	2-09	15	Castleblayney
4	Andrew Kilcullen	Easkey	1-11	14	Ballinasloe
5	Conor Hennessy	Tulllogher–Rosbercon	2-07	13	Colt–Shanahoe
5	Diarmuid Coleman	Feenagh–Kilmeedy	0-13	13	Banner
5	Andrew Kilcullen	Easkey	0-13	13	Carrick HC
8	Walter Walsh	Tulllogher–Rosbercon	2-06	12	Colt–Shanahoe
8	Jason Byrne	Craanford Fr O'Regan's	1-09	12	Kildavin/Clonegal
10	Thomas Hughes	Castleblayney	3-02	11	Seán Treacy's
10	Leo Moloney	Castleblayney	1-08	11	Cootehill Celtic
10	Darragh Melville	Leixlip	1-08	11	St Fechin's
10	Cian O'Donoghue	Tullogher-Rosbercon	1-08	11	St Patrick's
10	Shane Meehan	Banner	1-08	11	Tralee Parnells
10	Shea Walsh	Swatragh	1-08	11	Kilclief

=== Miscellaneous ===
- Cootehill Celtic recorded a first ever Ulster Championship victory when they beat Killeavy St Moninna's by 1–09 to 1–07 in the preliminary round.
