= 2025–26 All-Ireland Junior Club Hurling Championship =

All-Ireland inter-county competition for junior clubs

Championship Details
- Dates: 25 October 2025 – 10 January 2026
- Teams: 30

All Ireland Champions
- Winners: Kilbrittain (1st win)
- Captain: Philip Wall
- Manager: Joe Ryan

All Ireland Runners-up
- Runners-up: Easkey
- Captain: Finnian Cawley; Rory McHugh
- Manager: Pádraig Mannion

Provincial Champions
- Munster: Kilbrittain
- Leinster: Davidstown/Courtnacuddy
- Ulster: Burt
- Connacht: Easkey

Championship Statistics
- Matches Played: 29
- Total Goals: 84
- Total Points: 892
- Top Scorer: Liam Óg McKinney (1-56)

The 2025–26 All-Ireland Junior Club Hurling Championship was the 22nd staging of the All-Ireland Junior Club Hurling Championship, the Gaelic Athletic Association's junior inter-county club hurling tournament. The championship ran from 25 October 2025 to 10 January 2026.

The All-Ireland final was played at Croke Park in Dublin on 10 January 2025, between Kilbrittain of Cork and Easkey of Sligo, in what was a first championship meeting between the teams. Kilbrittain won the match by 0–19 to 0–18 and became the seventh team from Cork to win the title.

Burt's Liam Óg McKinney was the championship's top scorer with 1-56.

== Team summaries ==
Team	Championship	Most recent success		
Team	Championship	All-Ireland	Provincial	County
Ballinasloe	Galway J1HC			2024
Banner	Clare JAHC			
Barrow Rangers	Kilkenny PJHC			1990
Burt	Donegal JHC			
Cahir	Tipperary JAHC			1977
Castlewellan	Down JHC			1999
Clane	Kildare SBHC			
Clonad	Laois IHC			
Cluainín Iomáint	Leitrim SHC			2021
Con Magees Glenravel	Antrim JHC			
Cootehill Celtic	Cavan SHC			2023
Cuchulainns	Armagh IHC			
Davidstown/Courtnacuddy	Wexford IAHC			
Drumcullen	Offaly IHC			2010
Easkey	Sligo SHC		2024	2024
Erne Gaels	Fermanagh JHC			
Kenmare Shamrocks	Kerry IHC			2014
Kevin's	Dublin JAHC			
Kilbrittain	Cork PJHC			1985
Kilrossanty	Waterford JAHC			
Knockaderry	Limerick PJAHC			2004
Lavey	Derry JHC			
Moytura	Mayo JAHC			
Naomh Moninne	Louth SHC			2019
Omagh St Enda's	Tyrone JHC			
St Brigid's	Westmeath IHC			2014
Truagh Gaels	Monaghan SHC			
Thomas McCurtains	London IHC			
Ceann Creige	Lancashire SHC			2023
John Mitchel's	Warwickshire SHC			

== All-Britain Club Hurling Championship ==
=== All-Britain semi-final ===
19 October 2025 Semi-final	Thomas McCurtains (London)	0-14 - 1-09	John Mitchel's (Warwickshire)	Páirc na hÉireann Birmingham
				Referee: Eadhmonn Macsuibhne

=== All-Britain final ===
2 November 2025 Final	Thomas McCurtains (London)	6-16 - 1-07	Ceann Creige (Scotland)	Páirc na hÉireann Birmingham
				Referee: Des Kelly

== Connacht Junior Club Hurling Championship ==
The draw for the Connacht Club Championship took place on 18 December 2024.

=== Connacht semi-finals ===
15 November 2025 Semi-final	Cluainín Iomáint (Leitrim)	0-05 - 3-22	Easkey (Sligo)	Heartland Credit Union Páirc Seán MacDiarmada
	M Feeney 0–3 3f; M O'Brien 0–2 2f.	Report	A Kilcullen 2–12 4f, 2 x '65', pen; C Vereker 1–2, T Cawley 0–3, R Molloy 0–2, R McHugh, D Rolston & E Moylan 0–1 each.	Referee: Aaron Clogher

15 November 2025 Semi-final	Ballinasloe (Galway)	1-18 - 1-07	Moytura (Mayo)	Duggan Park
	C O'Hanlon 0-12.	Report		Referee: Des Kelly

=== Connacht final ===
22 November 2025 Final	Easkey (Sligo)	2-17 - 2-15	Ballinasloe (Galway)	Connacht GAA Centre of Excellence
	A Kilcullen 0-6 (5f), F Cawley 1-1, D Rolston 1-0, D Hanley 0-2, R McHugh 0-2, T Cawley 0-2, O Moylan, C Vereker, F Connolly, E Moylan 0-1 each	Report	C O’Hanlon 2-10 (5f), C Connolly 0-2, J Cunningham, E Hayes, A Caulfield 0-1 each	Referee: James Judge

== Leinster Junior Club Hurling Championship ==
Details about the Leinster Club Championship draw.

=== Leinster quarter-finals ===
8 November 2025 Quarter-final	Naomh Moninne (Louth)	2-17 - 2-24	Clane (Kildare)	Páirc Naomh Bríd
	D Geoghegan (0-8, 4f, 2 '65), C Murphy (1-3); M Gahan (1-1), F Cumiskey (0-2), T O'Dwyer (0-1), J Casey (0-1), U McEnaney (0-1).	Report	P McKenna (1-8, 5f, 1 '65), C Smith (0-5), S Henry (1-1), C Vizzard (0-3); D Colbert (0-3), S Healy (0-2), H Muldoon (0-2);

8 November 2025 Quarter-final	Kevin's (Dublin)	0-16 - 0-19	Clonad (Laois)	O'Toole Park
	K Walsh 0-6 (4f); D Power 0-3; A Mitchell 0-2; D O’Loughlin, D Reid (f), J Fenlon, B Considine, C Walsh 0-1 apiece.	Report	J Onions 0-9 (7f); F Holland, B Cormack 0-3 each; PJ Daly 0-2; D O’Sullivan, R Holmes 0-1 apiece.

8 November 2025 Quarter-final	Davidstown/Courtnacuddy (Wexford)	4-21 - 3-09	St Brigid's (Westmeath)	Samaritans St Patrick's Park
	James Doyle 2-3; Joe Doyle 1-2; O Hayes 1-4 (0-1 free); P Doyle 0-7 (6 frees, 1 '65); L Fitzpatrick 0-2; T O'Connor, S Nicholson, E Cloke 0-1 each.	Report	M Mullen 2-8 (1-5 frees, 0-1 '65); C Slevin 1-0; F Coyne 0-1.

9 November 2025 Quarter-final	Barrow Rangers (Kilkenny)	2-22 - 1-13	Drumcullen (Offaly)	Gowran Grounds
	J Healy (0-11, 4fs and 1 '65); S McDonald (2-4, 1f); K Flavin (0-5); B Hanlon, M Drennan (0-1 each)	Report	E Gath (0-5, 5fs); C Gath (1-2, 1f); P Lyons (0-3); D Hollywood, S Hanrahan, R Gath (0-1 each)

=== Leinster semi-finals ===
22 November 2025 Semi-final	Clane (Kildare)	2-22 - 1-06	Clonad (Laois)	Manguard Park Hawkfield
	S Henry 1-5, C Smith 1-3, P McKenna 0-4 (0-1 free, 0-1 65’), S Healy, S Shanahan and C Vizzard 0-2 each, D Colbert, M Doyle (free), S Christanseen and H Muldoon 0-1 each.	Report	F Holland 1-1, B Cormack 0-5 (0-3 frees, 0-2 65's).

22 November 2025 Semi-final	Barrow Rangers (Kilkenny)	0-15 - 2-15	Davidstown/Courtnacuddy (Wexford)	Canon Kearns Park
	J Healy 0-9, K Rudkins 0-2, K O'Neill 0-1, M Doyle 0-1, B Hanlon 0-1, C Purcell 0-1.		P Doyle 0-6, O Hayes 1-2, James Doyle 1-1, B Smith 0-3, D Dunne 0-2, M Murphy 0-1.

=== Leinster final ===
7 December 2025 Final	Clane (Kildare)	0-11 - 3-12	Davidstown/Courtnacuddy (Wexford)	Manguard Park
	P McKenna 0-4 (3 x frees, 1 x '65), D Malone 0-2, S Henry 0-1, S Healy 0-1, C Smith 0-1, C Vizzard 0-1, A Connolly 0-1.	Report	D Dunne 2-1, James Doyle 1-0, O Hayes 0-3 (2 x frees, 1 x '65), Joe Doyle 0-3, J Kelly 0-2, P Doyle 0-2, B Smith 0-1.

== Munster Junior Club Hurling Championship ==
The draw for the Munster Club Championship took place on 31 July 2025.

=== Munster quarter-finals ===
1 November 2025 Quarter-final	Kenmare Shamrocks (Kerry)	2-14 - 2-16	Knockaderry (Limerick)	Templenoe Grounds
	L Palmer 1-5 (0-1 ’65, 0-4fs), L O’Sullivan 1-0, F O’Sullivan 0-3 (0-2fs), E McCarthy, J Lehane 0-2 each, K Harrington, T Cronin 0-1 each.	Report	M Danaher 0-7 (0-3fs, 0-1 ’65), T Condon, R Egan 0-4 each, E Moran, B Guiry 1-0 each, K Storin 0-1.

1 November 2025 Quarter-final	Kilrossanty (Waterford)	2-14 - 0-19	Banner (Clare)	Páirc Naomh Bríd
	P Fitzgerald 0-9 (6fs, 1 65), A Dunwoody 1-2, E Power 1-0, D Fitzgerald, P Cunningham, D Walsh 0-1 each.	Report	D Toner 0-7 (6fs), S Meehan 0-6, R Kilroy 0-3 (2fs), T Meenaghan 0-2, M McGrath 0-1.

=== Munster semi-finals ===
15 November 2025 Semi-final	Kilrossanty (Waterford)	4-14 - 0-11	Cahir (Tipperary)	Páirc Naomh Bríd
	P Fitzgerald 2-8 (0-4f), A Dunwoody 2-2, J Power, D Walsh, E Power, J Whyte 0-1 each.	Report	C Guiry 0-5 (3F), J Kiely 0-2, S Crogan, D Butler, C McEniry, C Condon 0-1 each.

15 November 2025 Semi-final	Knockaderry (Limerick)	1-16 - 1-23	Kilbrittain (Cork)	Knockaderry Grounds
	M Danaher 1-11 (0-9 f, 0-1 65), E Moran 0-2, M Molloy, E Foley, R Keating 0-1 each.	Report	M Hickey 0-12 (0-9 f, 0-1 65), L Griffin 1-2, C Hogan 0-3, B Butler, J O’Donovan 0-2 each, P Wall, R Crowley 0-1 each.

=== Munster final ===
29 November 2025 Final	Kilbrittain (Cork)	2-17 - 0-09	Kilrossanty (Waterford)	Mallow GAA Sports Complex
	M Hickey 1-9 (0-9 f), B Butler 1-3 (0-1 f), A Holland, T Sheehan, J O’Donovan, L Griffin, S Sexton 0-1 each.	Report	P Fitzgerald 0-7 (0-6 f), S Fitzgerald 0-2 (0-1 f).

== Ulster Junior Club Hurling Championship ==
Details about the Ulster Club Championship draw.

=== Ulster First round ===
25 October 2025 First round	Truagh Gaels (Monaghan)	2-11 - 0-11	Omagh St Enda's (Tyrone)	St Mellan's Park
	N Coyle (1-1) C McKenna (1-1) D Carville (0-3, 1f) M Flood (0-2) G Mohan, G Mohan, K McGuirk, C Boyle (0-1 each).		T McClements 0-6, L Griffiths 0-1, O McGuigan 0-1, D Woodhead 0-1, O O'Neill 0-1, B Gallagher 0-1.

=== Ulster quarter-finals ===
1 November 2025 Quarter-final	Cúchulainn's (Armagh)	7-23 - 1-11	Erne Gaels (Fermanagh)	BOX-IT Athletic Grounds
	O Hughes 3-3, C Duffy 1-2, L Murtagh 0-5 (3f), F Oliver 1-1, J Donnelly 1-1, A Cullinane 0-3, C Devlin 0-3, W Wong 1-0, J Scallon 0-2, J Murtagh 0-2 (1f).	Report	C McManus 1-3 (3f), S Curran 0-4 (4f), U O’Reilly 0-1, C Duffy 0-1, F Deery 0-1.

2 November 2025 Quarter-final	Lavey (Derry)	3-16 - 1-08	Cootehill Celtic (Cavan)	Owenbeg Cente of Excellence
	R Mulholland 1-4, C Melaugh 1-3, F Bradley 0-4 (3f), A Duffin 1-1, T Lynch 0-2, R McGill (f) and D Young 0-1 each	Report	M Moffet 1-5 (1-4f), D McKeever 0-2, R Delany and C Shalvey 0-1 each

2 November 2025 Quarter-final	Castlewellan (Down)	0-14 - 3-26	Burt (Donegal)	Fontenoys Park
	M McCabe 0-6 (2f); S O’Neill 0-3; E Maginn 0-2 (1f, 1 65); D Rogers 0-1; T Connolly 0-1 (1f); E Fitzsimmons 0-1.	Report	L Óg McKinney 0-10 (5f); S Gillespie 2-0; R McDermott 0-4; C Porter 0-3; A McKinney 0-3; K McColgan 1-0; C Gartland 0-2; K Brady 0-2; F Gill 0-2.

2 November 2025 Quarter-final	Con Magees Glenravel (Antrim)	0-19 - 0-16	Truagh Gaels (Monaghan)	Páirc Mhuire
	C O’Loan 0-13 (10fs), S McKay 0-3, C Higgins, D Traynor and F Donaghy 0-1 each.	Report	D Carville 0-12 (fs), C McKenna 0-2, E Carville and N Coyle 0-1 each

=== Ulster semi-finals ===
8 November 2025 Semi-final	Lavey (Derry)	0-21 - 2-06	Cúchulainn's (Armagh)	Páirc Colmcille
		Report

9 November 2025 Semi-final	Burt (Donegal)	1-15 - 1-09	Con Magees Glenravel (Antrim)	Celtic Park
	L Óg McKinney 1-11 (0-5fs), R McDermott 0-1, C Gartland 0-1, E McDaid 0-1, D Grant 0-1.	Report	C McKeown 0-5, D Traynor 1-0, C O’Loan 0-2 (1f), S McKay 0-1, C Higgins 0-1.

=== Ulster final ===
15 November 2025 Final	Burt (Donegal)	0-20 - 1-16 (aet)	Lavey (Derry)	Celtic Park
	L Óg McKinney (0-10, 8f); C Gartland 0-6 (3f); R McDermott 0-2; K Curran 0-1; F Gill 0-1.	Report	F Bradley 0-9 (6f, 1 65, 1 sideline); R Mulholland 1-2; C Melaugh 0-3; R McGill 0-1; T Melaugh 0-1.

=== Ulster twinning final ===
29 November 2025 Final	Thomas McCurtains (London)	0-17 - 1-15	Burt (Donegal)	McGovern Park
	S Lowry 0-6 (6f); J Byrne 0-4; M Russell 0-2; D Corrigan 0-2; C Mellet 0-2; K O’Donoghue 0-1.	Report	L Óg McKinney 0-12 (7f, 2 65s); K Brady 1-0; C Gartland 0-1; K McColgan 0-1; A McKinney 0-1.

== All-Ireland Junior Club Hurling Championship ==
=== All-Ireland semi-finals ===
20 December 2025 Semi-final	Burt (Donegal)	1-22 - 4-23 (aet)	Easkey (Sligo)	Fr Tierney Park
		Report	A Kilcullen 4-10.

20 December 2025 Semi-final	Davidstown/Courtnacuddy (Wexford)	1-16 - 2-15	Kilbrittain (Cork)	Clonmel Sportsfield
	O Hayes 0-10 (0-7 f, 0-1 65), L Fitzpatrick 1-1, P Doyle 0-2, D Dunne, Joe Doyle, T O’Connor.	Report	M Hickey 0-12 (0-10 f), L Griffin, C Hogan 1-0 each, T Sheehan, R Crowley, B Butler 0-1 each.

=== All-Ireland final ===
10 January 2026 Final	Kilbrittain (Cork)	0-19 - 0-18	Easkey (Sligo)	Croke Park
	M Hickey 0-9 (0-4 f), R Crowley 0-4, P Wall 0-2, S Sexton, C Hogan, L Griffin, B Butler 0-1 each.	Report	A Kilcullen 0-6 (0-2 f, 0-1 sl), T Cawley 0-5 (0-2 f), F Cawley 0-2, R Molloy, R McHugh, É Moylan, D Rolston, O Moylan 0-1 each.	Referee: E Furlong (Wexford)

== Championship statistics ==
=== Top scorers ===
Rank	Player	Club	Tally	Total	Matches	Average
1	Liam Óg McKinney	Burt	1-56	59	5	11.80
2	Andrew Kilcullen	Easkey	6-34	52	4	13.00
3	Mark Hickey	Kilbrittain	1-42	45	4	11.25
4	Pádraig Fitzgerald	Kilrossanty	2-24	30	3	10.00
5	Cathal O'Hanlon	Ballinasloe	2-22	28	2	14.00
6	Oisín Hayes	Davidstown/Courtnacuddy	2-19	25	4	6.25
7	Mark Danaher	Knockaderry	1-18	21	2	10.50
8	Joe Healy	Barrow Rangers	0-20	20	2	10.00
9	Paddy McKenna	Clane	1-16	19	3	6.33
10	Pauric Doyle	Davidstown/Courtnacuddy	0-17	17	4	4.25
