= 2022–23 All-Ireland Junior Club Hurling Championship =

Gaelic sports event in Ireland

Championship Details
- Dates: 29 October 2022 – 15 January 2023
- Teams: 33

All Ireland Champions
- Winners: Ballygiblin (1st win)
- Captain: Fionn Herlihy
- Manager: Ronan Dwane

All Ireland Runners-up
- Runners-up: Easkey
- Captain: Bernard Feeney
- Manager: Michael Gordon

Provincial Champions
- Munster: Ballygiblin
- Leinster: Horeswood
- Ulster: Setanta
- Connacht: Easkey

Championship Statistics
- Matches Played: 32
- Total Goals: 81 (2.53 per game)
- Total Points: 867 (27.09 per game)
- Top Scorer: Andrew Kilcullen (4-32)

The 2022–23 All-Ireland Junior Club Hurling Championship was the 19th staging of the All-Ireland Junior Club Hurling Championship, the Gaelic Athletic Association's junior inter-county club hurling tournament. The championship ran from 29 October 2022 to 14 January 2023.

The All-Ireland final was played on 14 January 2023 at Croke Park in Dublin, between Ballygiblin from Cork and Easkey from Sligo, in what was their first ever meeting in the final. Ballygiblin won the match by 1-16 to 0-11 to claim their first ever championship title.

Easkey's Andrew Kilcullen was the championship's top scorer with 4-32.

== Team summaries ==
| Province | County Championship | Club |
|---|---|---|
| Connacht | Galway Junior Hurling Championship | Ballygar |
| Connacht | Leitrim Senior Hurling Championship | Carrick Hurling |
| Connacht | Sligo Senior Hurling Championship | Easkey |
| Leinster | Carlow Intermediate Hurling Championship | Burren Rangers |
| Leinster | Dublin Junior Hurling Championship | Commercials |
| Leinster | Europe Senior Hurling Championship | Amsterdam |
| Leinster | Kildare Senior B Hurling Championship | Éire Óg-Corrachoill |
| Leinster | Kilkenny Premier Junior Hurling Championship | Blacks and Whites |
| Leinster | Laois Intermediate Hurling Championship | Mountmellick |
| Leinster | Longford Senior Hurling Championship | Clonguish |
| Leinster | Louth Senior Hurling Championship | St Fechin's |
| Leinster | Meath Intermediate Hurling Championship | Dunderry |
| Leinster | Offaly Intermediate Hurling Championship | Shamrocks |
| Leinster | Westmeath Intermediate Hurling Championship | Ringtown |
| Leinster | Wexford Intermediate A Hurling Championship | Horeswood |
| Leinster | Wicklow Intermediate Hurling Championship | Kilcoole |
| Munster | Clare Junior Hurling Championship | Banner |
| Munster | Cork Junior A Hurling Championship | Ballygiblin |
| Munster | Kerry Intermediate Hurling Championship | Kilgarvan |
| Munster | Limerick Junior Hurling Championship | St Kieran's |
| Munster | Tipperary Junior A Hurling Championship | Grangemockler-Ballyneale |
| Munster | Waterford Junior Hurling Championship | Colligan |
| Ulster | Antrim Junior Hurling Championship | Shane O’Neill's |
| Ulster | Armagh Junior Hurling Championship | Seán Treacy's |
| Ulster | Cavan Senior Hurling Championship | Cootehill Celtic |
| Ulster | Derry Junior Hurling Championship | Na Magha |
| Ulster | Donegal Senior Hurling Championship | Setanta |
| Ulster | Down Junior Hurling Championship | St. Peter's |
| Ulster | Monaghan Senior Hurling Championship | Carrickmacross |
| Ulster | Tyrone Junior Hurling Championship | Eoghan Ruadh, Dungannon |
| Britain | Lancashire Senior Hurling Championship | Fullen Gaels |
| Britain | London Intermediate Hurling Championship | Kilburn Gaels |
| Britain | Warwickshire Senior Hurling Championship | John Mitchel's |

== Connacht Junior Club Hurling Championship ==
| Semi-Finals | | Final |
| Easkey (Sligo) | 3-25 |
| Carrick Hurling Club (Leitrim) | 1-06 | Easkey (Sligo) | 0-05 |
| | | Ballygar (Galway) | 0-04 |

=== Connacht semi-final ===
| 5 November 2022 Semi-final | Easkey (Sligo) | 3-25 - 1-06 | Carrick Hurling Club (Leitrim) | Markievicz Park |
| | A Kilcullen (2-14), J McHugh (1-3), T Cawley (0-4), M Gordon (0-2), R McHugh (0-1, Fionn Connolly (0-1). | Report | C Cunniffe (0-6), C Beirne (1-0). |

=== Connacht final ===
| 19 November 2022 Final | Easkey (Sligo) | 0-05 - 0-04 | Ballygar (Galway) | Connacht COE |
| | A. Kilcullen 0-4, T. Cawley 0-1 | Report | S. Lohan 0-3, R. Duffy 0-1 | Referee: J. Judge (Mayo) |

== Leinster Junior Club Hurling Championship ==
=== Leinster first round ===
| 29 October 2022 First round | Kilcoole (Wicklow) | 1-13 - 1-11 | Amsterdam | Kilcoole GAA Grounds |
| | E Keddy 0-6, L Evans 0-4, C Frawley 1-0, C Doyle 0-1, C Carroll 0-1, J Toner 0-1. | | G McDermott 0-7, D O'Farrell 1-1, C Mahon 0-2, B O'Malley 0-1. | Referee: D Ryan (Meath) |

| 29 October 2022 First round | St Fechin's (Louth) | 1-18 - 0-10 | Dunderry (Meath) | Darver COE |
| | P Lynch 0-11, P Grace 1-2, S Conneely 0-1, E Kerrisk 0-1, P Mathews 0-1, D Stephenson 0-1, S Hodgins 0-1. | | L Martyn 0-8, A Kelly 0-1, L Coogan 0-1. | Referee: M Redmond (Kildare) |

| 29 October 2022 First round | Clonguish Gaels (Longford) | 1-12 - 1-16 | Ringtown (Westmeath) | Glennon Brothers Pearse Park |
| | B Hanley 0-8, J O'Brien 1-2, D Crossan 0-2. | | R McAuley 1-2, M Cunningham 0-5, J Moran 0-3, L Moore 0-2, D Kilcoyne 0-1, J Lee 0-1, C Moran 0-1, E Corrigan 0-1. | Referee: SM Maher (Offaly) |

| 29 October 2022 First round | Éire Óg-Corrachoill (Kildare) | 2-15 - 1-16 | Shamrocks (Offaly) | Kildare COE |
| | P Dolan 0-8, R O'Neill 1-1, C Kielty 1-0, L Dempsey 0-3, J Higgins 0-1, D Murray 0-1, S Cramer 0-1. | | N Dunne 0-10, P Cantwell 1-2, D Molloy 0-3, S O'Toole-Greene 0-1. | Referee: B Heaney (Westmeath) |

| 29 October 2022 First round | Burren Rangers (Carlow) | 0-11 - 3-17 | Mountmellick (Laois) | Netwatch Carlow Training Centre |
| | D Townsend 0-8, L Doyle 0-1, C Bolger 0-1, B Shanahan 0-1. | | M Bermingham 1-10, J Hillard 1-1, J Connolly 1-1, B Mangan 0-2, R McEvoy 0-1, J Connolly 0-1, F Culleton 0-1. | Referee: B Kearney (Kildare) |

=== Leinster quarter-finals ===
| 12 November 2022 Quarter-final | St Fechin's (Louth) | 1-18 - 1-06 | Kilcoole (Wicklow) | Carver COE |
| | P Lynch 0-11 (5f), M Byrne 1-0, S Conneely 0-3; S Hodgins 0-1, B Grace 0-1, D Ryan 0-1; J McDonnell 0-1. | Report | L Evans 1-1, E Keddy 0-4 (4f), R Keddy 0-1. |

| 12 November 2022 Quarter-final | Commercials (Dublin) | 1-27 - 0-10 | Mountmellick (Laois) | O'Toole Park |
| | J O'Keeffe 1-6, D Ó Dualaing 0-7, C Ó Nualláin 0-4, J Flanagan 0-4, D Dungan 0-2, G Keogh 0-1, C Crokes 0-1, A Drewitt 0-1, D Molloy 0-1. | | M Bermingham 0-5, J Connolly 0-2, J Hilliard 0-2, B Mangan 0-1. |

| 12 November 2022 Quarter-final | Horeswood (Wexford) | 0-20 - 0-13 | Éire Óg-Corrachoill (Kildare) | St. Patrick's Park |
| | C Foley (0-5, 2 frees); S Nolan (0-4), D Murphy (0-3), J Kehoe (0-3); J Myler (0-2), S Hunt (0-1), S Stafford (0-1), M O’Hanlon (0-1 ’65). | Report | P Dolan (0-10, 4 frees, 1 ’65); L Dempsey (0-1); C Kielthy (0-1), K Connor (0-1). |

| 12 November 2022 Quarter-final | Ringtown (Westmeath) | 0-17 - 2-20 (aet) | Blacks and Whites (Kilkenny) | TEG Cusack Park |
| | M Cunningham 0-8 (3f, 2 ’65s’), J Moran (frees) and E Corrigan 0-3 each, C Moran 0-2, L Moore 0-1. | Report | R Murphy 0-13 (8f, 1 ’65’), Jamie Byrne 1-2, S Byrne 1-1, P Murphy, S Doyle, Jason Byrne and A Foley 0-1 each. |

=== Leinster semi-finals ===
| 26 November 2022 Semi-final | Blacks and Whites (Kilkenny) | 0-10 - 2-07 | Commercials (Dublin) | UPMC Nowlan Park |
| | R Murphy 0-4, J Byrne 0-2, A O'Dowd 0-1, A Foley 0-1, S Byrne 0-1, S Doyle 0-1. | | D Ó Dulaing 1-4, G Keogh 1-0, J O'Keeffe 0-2, J Flanagan 0-1. | Referee: É Furlong (Wexford) |

| 26 November 2022 Semi-final | Horeswood (Wexford) | 1-08 - 1-04 | St Fechin's (Louth) | St. Patrick's Park |
| | S Nolan 1-1, C Foley 0-3, M O'Hanlon 0-2, D Murphy 0-1, A Harris 0-1. | | J Murray 1-0, B Grace 0-2, S Conneely 0-1, P Lynch 0-1. |

=== Leinster final ===
| 10 December 2022 Final | Horeswood (Wexford) | 1-18 - 3-11 | Commercials (Dublin) | Ferns Centre of Excellence |
| | C Foley 0-5 (4 frees), C Parker 1-1, S Nolan 0-4, J Myler and Declan Murphy 0-2 each, S Stafford, J Kehoe, D Flannelly and M O’Hanlon (free) 0-1 each. | Report | D O Dulaing 0-7 (4 frees, 1 65), A Drewett 1-2, J O’Keeffe and K Butler 1-0 each, G Keogh and C Morris 0-1 each. | Referee: P Dunne (Laois) |

== Munster Junior Club Hurling Championship ==
=== Munster quarter-finals ===
| 5 November 2022 Quarter-final | Kilgarvan (Kerry) | 1-15 - 2-15 | The Banner, Ennis (Clare) | Dr. Crokes GAA Grounds |
| | C O’Connell (0-5, 5f), R O’Sullivan (1-1), G Fennessy (0-4, 2f, 1sl), D O’Sullivan (0-3), D Casey and R Foley (0-1 each). | Report | S Meehan (2-11, 6f), D O’Halloran (0-2), O McMahon and T Meenaghan (0-1 each) | Referee: J O'Halloran (Limerick) |

| 5 November 2022 Quarter-final | Grangemockler-Ballyneale (Tipperary) | 0-11 - 2-10 | Ballygiblin (Cork) | FBD Semple Stadium |
| | D Shelley 0-9 (0-7f, 0-1 65), C Hahessy, J Lyons 0-1 each. | Report | J O’Sullivan 0-5 (0-4f), D Flynn 1-2, C O’Mahony 1-1 (0-1 sideline), D Barry, S O’Sullivan 0-1 each. | Referee: N Barry (Waterford) |

=== Munster semi-finals ===
| 19 November 2022 Semi-final | The Banner, Ennis (Clare) | 0-16 - 0-17 | St. Kieran's (Limerick) | Cusack Park |
| | S Meehan (0-12, 9f), D O’Halloran (0-2), M McGrath (0-1), F Hayes (0-1). | Report | I Mackessy (0-6f), C Ambrose (0-3, 2f, 1 ’65), D Nolan (0-3), A Mullins (0-1), C McEnery (0-1), C Mann (0-1), J Muckell (0-1), M Flynn (0-1). | Referee: A Tierney (Tipperary) |

| 20 November 2022 Semi-final | Ballygiblin (Cork) | 1-19 - 0-10 | Colligan (Waterford) | Páirc Uí Rinn |
| | J O’Sullivan (0-11, 0-3 ‘65s, 0-5 frees), D Flynn (1-1), S Beston and C O’Mahony (0-3 each), R Donegan (0-1). | Report | J Wall (0-4, frees), D Booth and J Booth (0-2 each), G Whelan and C Dunford (0-1 each). | Referee: J Mullins (Clare) |

=== Munster final ===
| 4 December 2022 Final | Ballygiblin (Cork) | 3-12 - 0-11 | St. Kieran's (Limerick) | Mallow GAA Complex |
| | S Beston 3-3, J O’Sullivan 0-9 (0-7f, 0-1 65). | Report | I Mackessy 0-10 (0-8f, 0-1 65), D Treacy 0-1. | Referee: C Doyle (Tipperary) |

== Ulster Junior Club Hurling Championship ==
=== Ulster quarter-finals ===
| 6 November 2022 Quarter-final | Na Magha (Derry) | 4-18 - 1-12 | St. Peter's (Down) | Celtic Park |
| | M Lynch (3-2), D Foley (0-7, 3f, 1 '65'), K Doherty (1-1), P Nelis (0-2), B Quigley (0-2), A Cutliffe (0-2), T Lally (0-1), T Rankin (0-1). | Report | J O'Kane (1-10, 8f, 1 '65'), A Higgins (0-1), T Murphy (0-1). |

| 6 November 2022 Quarter-final | Setanta (Donegal) | 1-16 - 2-11 | Dungannon Eoghan Ruadh (Tyrone) | O'Donnell Park |
| | D Coulter 0-5, 4f; D Flynn 1-1; B Lafferty 0-3; O Marley 0-2; C McGettigan, R Campbell, G Gilmore, S Ward and J Cronnolly-McGee 0-1 each. | Report | B Molloy 1-2, M McCann 1-0; C Ferguson 0-4,3f; R Weir, SP McKiernan, L Devlin, T Morgan and J Ferguson 0-1 each |

| 6 November 2022 Quarter-final | Cootehill Celtic (Cavan) | 1-12 - 5-12 | Seán Treacy's (Armagh) | Kingspan Breffni Park |
| | M Moffett 0-8 (6f), D Carney 1-0, F Hughes 0-2 (1f), N Clerkin 0-1 (1f), R Delaney 0-1. | Report | D Magee 3-6 (4f), R Daly 2-0, M Doran 0-3, T McKavanagh 0-1, S Holloway 0-1, K Lavery 0-1. |

| 6 November 2022 Quarter-final | Carrickmacross (Monaghan) | 1-12 - 4-27 | Shane O'Neill's (Antrim) | Grattan Park |
| | O Kieran 1-3, J Guinan 0-2, E Collins 0-1, R McMahon 0-1. | Report | D Hamill 3-6, C Magill 0-10, N McGarel 1-2, D McLaughlin 0-3, S O'Boyle 0-3, D Black 0-2, K O'Boyle 0-2. |

=== Ulster semi-finals ===
| 12 November 2022 Semi-final | Setanta (Donegal) | 2-20 - 1-16 | Na Magha (Derry) | O'Neill's Healy Park |
| | D Coulter 0-14,13f; S Ward and R Campbell 1-0; O Marley and J Cronnolly-McGee 0-2; D Flynn 0-1. | Report | D Foley 0-11, 11f; M Lynch 1-1; B Quigley 0-2; P Nelis and R McAdams 0-1. |

| 12 November 2022 Semi-final | Shane O'Neill's (Antrim) | 1-20 - 0-12 | Seán Treacy's (Armagh) | Donaghmore Road |
| | K O'Boyle 1-4, D Hamill 0-7, N McGarel 0-4, S O'Boyle 0-3, C Magill 0-2. | Report | D Magee 0-10, K Laverty 0-1, T McKavanagh 0-1. |

=== Ulster final ===
| 27 November 2022 Final | Setanta (Donegal) | 1-22 - 0-15 | Shane O'Neill's (Antrim) | Celtic Park |
| | D Flynn 1-7, D Coulter 0-10, O Marley 0-2, R Campbell 0-1, B Lafferty 0-1, G Gilmore 0-1. | | D Hamill 0-6, N McGarrell 0-2, A Scullion 0-2, D Black 0-1, S O'Boyle 0-1, D McLaughlin 0-1, K O'Boyle 0-1, C Magill 0-1. |

== All-Britain Club Hurling Championship ==
=== Britain semi-finals ===
| 13 November 2022 Semi-final | Kilburn Gaels (London) | 2-23 - 3-08 | John Mitchel's (Warwickshire) | McGovern Park |

=== Britain final ===
| 20 November 2022 Final | Fullen Gaels (Lancashire) | 2-07 - 4-22 | Kilburn Gaels (London) | Páirc na hÉireann |

== All-Ireland Junior Club Hurling Championship ==
Quarter-Finals
Kilburn Gaels (London) | 3-12
Setanta (Donegal) | 0-17

Semi-Finals
Easkey (Sligo) | 3-15
Kilburn Gaels (London) | 4-06
Ballygiblin (Cork) | 1-12
Horeswood (Wexford) | 0-08

Final
Easkey (Sligo) | 0-11
Ballygiblin (Cork) | 1-16

=== All-Ireland quarter-finals ===
| 3 December 2022 Quarter-final | Kilburn Gaels (London) | 3-12 - 0-17 | Setanta (Donegal) | Carrickmore Grounds |
| | C Nelson 0-8, 7f; D Reale 2-0; D O’Sullivan 1-0; P Earley 0-2; E Kelly and F Collins 0-1. | Report | D Coulter 0-9 5f, 2 65s; G Gilmore and B Lafferty 0-2; J Cronnolly-McGee, R Campbell, D Cullen and N Cleary 0-1 each. | Referee: J Judge (Mayo) |

=== All-Ireland semi-finals ===
| 18 December 2022 Semi-final | Easkey (Sligo) | 3-15 - 4-06 | Kilburn Gaels (London) | Louth GAA Centre of Excellence, Darver |
| | A Kilcullen 2-9 (3f); R McHugh 1-1 (1-0 pen); T Cawley, R Molloy, F Cawley, M Gordon, J McHugh 0-1 each | Report | M O’Dwyer 2-0; C Nelson 0-5 (3f, 1 ‘65’); A Hands, D Reale 1-0 each; F Collins 0-1 | Referee: K Brady (Louth) |

| 18 December 2022 Semi-final | Ballygiblin (Cork) | 1-12 - 0-08 | Horeswood (Wexford) | Fraher Field |
| | D Flynn (1-4), J O’Sullivan (0-5 frees), R Donegan, S Beston and C O’Mahony (0-1 each). | Report | C Foley (0-4, 0-3 frees), C Parker, S Stafford, S Nolan and M O’Hanlon (0-1 each). | Referee: M Kennedy (Tipperary_ |

=== All-Ireland final ===
| 14 January 2023 Final | Ballygiblin (Cork) | 1-16 - 0-11 | Easkey (Sligo) | Croke Park |
| | J O’Sullivan 0-10 (0-6f, 0-1 65), C O’Mahony 0-3, D Flynn 1-0, S Beston 0-2, D Barry 0-1. | Report | A Kilcullen 0-5 (0-3f), J McHugh 0-2, R McHugh, M Gordon, D Hanley, T Cawley 0-1 each. | Referee: C Flynn (Westmeath) |

== Championship statistics ==
=== Top scorers ===
Overall

| Rank | Player | Club | Tally | Total | Matches | Average |
|---|---|---|---|---|---|---|
| 1 | Andrew Kilcullen | Easkey | 4-32 | 44 | 4 | 11.00 |
| 2 | Joseph O'Sullivan | Ballygiblin | 0-40 | 40 | 5 | 8.00 |
| 3 | Declan Coulter | Setanta | 0-38 | 38 | 4 | 9.50 |
| 4 | Shane Meehan | Banner | 2-23 | 29 | 2 | 14.50 |
| 5 | Darren Hamill | Shane O'Neill's | 3-19 | 28 | 3 | 9.33 |
| 6 | Danny Magee | Seán Treacy's | 3-16 | 25 | 2 | 12.50 |
| 7 | Paddy Lynch | St Fechin's | 0-23 | 23 | 3 | 7.66 |
| 8 | Diarmaid Ó Dúlaing | Commercials | 1-18 | 21 | 3 | 7.00 |
| 9 | Darragh Flynn | Ballygiblin | 4-07 | 19 | 5 | 3.80 |
| 10 | Shane Beston | Ballygiblin | 3-09 | 18 | 5 | 3.60 |
| 10 | Mick Bermingham | Mountmellick | 1-15 | 18 | 2 | 9.00 |
| 10 | Paul Dolan | Éire Óg-Corrachoill | 0-18 | 18 | 2 | 9.00 |
| 10 | Déaglán Foley | Na Magha | 0-18 | 18 | 2 | 9.00 |

In a single game

| Rank | Player | Club | Tally | Total | Opposition |
|---|---|---|---|---|---|
| 1 | Andrew Kilcullen | Easkey | 2-14 | 20 | Carrick |
| 2 | Shane Meehan | Banner | 2-11 | 17 | Kilgarvan |
| 3 | Andrew Kilcullen | Easkey | 2-09 | 15 | Kilburn Gaels |
| 3 | Danny Magee | Seán Treacys | 3-06 | 15 | Cootehill Celtic |
| 3 | Darren Hamill | Shane O'Neill's | 3-06 | 15 | Carrickmacross |
| 6 | Declan Coulter | Setanta | 0-14 | 14 | Na Magha |
| 7 | Mick Bermingham | Mountmellick | 1-10 | 13 | Burren Rangers |
| 7 | John O'Kane | St. Peter's | 1-10 | 13 | Na Magha |
| 7 | Ryan Murphy | Blacks and Whites | 0-13 | 13 | Ringtown |
| 10 | Shane Beston | Ballygiblin | 3-03 | 12 | St. Kieran's |
| 10 | Shane Meehan | Banner | 0-12 | 12 | St. Kieran's |

=== Miscellaneous ===
- Shane Beston's score of 3-03 against St. Kieran's is the highest individual score ever recorded by a player in a Munster final.
- Ballygiblin became the first team to win consecutive Munster Championship titles.
