= 1916 Dublin Senior Hurling Championship =

Annual hurling competition season

- Champions: Commercials (9th title)
- Runners-up: Faughs

The 1916 Dublin Senior Hurling Championship was the 29th staging of the Dublin Senior Hurling Championship since its establishment by the Dublin County Board in 1887.

Faughs entered the championship as the defending champions.

The final was played on 30 July 1916 at Croke Park in Dublin, between Commercials and Faughs, in what was their fifth meeting in the final overall. Commercials won the match by 4–05 to 3–03 to claim their ninth championship title overall and a first title in seven years. It remains their last championship title.

== Results ==
=== Final ===
30 July 1916 Final	Commercials	4-05 - 3-03	Faughs	Croke Park
