= Connacht Junior Club Hurling Championship =

Sports competition in Ireland

- Current season or competition: 2026 Connacht Junior Club Hurling Championship
- Irish: Craobh Shóisir Iománaíochta Connachta na gClub
- Code: Hurling
- Founded: 2004; 22 years ago
- Region: Connacht (GAA)
- No. of teams: 4
- Title holders: Sylane (4th title)
- First winner: Oran
- Most titles: Calry-St Joseph's (4 titles); Easkey; Sylane (4 titles)
- Sponsors: Allied Irish Banks

The Connacht Junior Club Hurling Championship (known for sponsorship reasons as the AIB Connacht GAA Hurling Junior Club Championship and known for short as the Connacht Club JHC) is an annual hurling competition organised by the Connacht Council of the Gaelic Athletic Association and contested by the four champion clubs in the province of Connacht in Ireland. It is the most prestigious competition for junior clubs in Connacht hurling.

The Connacht Junior Club Championship was introduced in 2004. In its current format, the championship is usually played over a two-week period in November. The four participating club teams compete in a straight knockout competition that culminates with the Connacht final. The winner of the Connacht Junior Championship qualifies for the subsequent All-Ireland Club Championship.

The title has been won at least once by 11 different clubs. The all-time record-holders are Calry-St Joseph's, Easkey and Sylane who have won four championship titles. Sylane are the also the title-holders after defeating Naomh Eoin by 2-25 to 1-15 in the 2026 Connacht final.

== Teams ==
=== Qualification ===
County	Championship	Qualifying Team
Galway	Galway Premier Junior Hurling Championship	Champions
Leitrim	Leitrim Senior Hurling Championship	Champions
Mayo	Mayo Junior Hurling Championship	Champions
Sligo	Sligo Senior Hurling Championship	Champions

=== 2026 teams ===
28 clubs competed in the 2026 Connacht Junior Club Hurling Championship:

County	No.	Clubs competing in county championship
Galway	10	**Sylane**, Abbeyknockmoy, Kilbeacanty, Ballinasloe, Spiddal, Mícheál Breathnach, Annaghdown, Salthill-Knocknacarra, Bearna/Na Forbacha, Kiltormer
Leitrim	2	**Carrick Hurling**, Cluainín Iomáint
Mayo	9	Ballina Stephenites, Castlebar Mitchels B, **Moytura**, Gaeltacht Iorrais, Tooreen B, Caiseal Gaels, Westport, Ballyvary, Claremorris
Sligo	7	Calry St. Joseph's, Coolera-Strandhill, **Easkey**, Naomh Eoin, Naomh Molaise Gaels, Tourlestrane, Western Gaels

Note: Bold indicates title-holders.

== List of Finals ==
=== List of Connacht JHC finals ===
Year	Winners			Runners-up		
Year	County	Club	Score	County	Club	Score
2026	GAL	Sylane	2-25	SLI	Naomh Eoin	1-15
2025	SLI	Easkey Sea Blues	2-17	GAL	Ballinasloe	2-15
2024	SLI	Easkey Sea Blues	0-18	GAL	Ballinasloe	1-11
2023	SLI	Easkey Sea Blues	1-18	GAL	Ballinasloe	2-12
2022	SLI	Easkey Sea Blues	0-05	GAL	Ballygar	0-04
2021	GAL	Salthill-Knocknacarra	1-16	SLI	Easkey Sea Blues	1-12
2020	No Championship					
2019	GAL	Míchael Breathnach	1-12	SLI	Naomh Eoin	0-08
2018	LEI	Carrick Hurling	2-11	GAL	Ballygar	2-09
2017	GAL	Sylane	0-21	SLI	Calry/St. Joseph's	0-05
2016	SLI	Calry/St. Joseph's	3-09	GAL	Míchael Breathnach	2-10
2015	GAL	Sylane	1-18	SLI	Calry/St. Joseph's	2-07
2014	GAL	Annaghdown	2-11	SLI	Calry/St. Joseph's	0-06
2013	SLI	Calry/St. Joseph's	2-12	GAL	An Spidéal	2-10
2012	SLI	Calry/St. Joseph's	1-12	GAL	Skehana	1-11
2011	GAL	Ballygar	2-13	SLI	Calry/St. Joseph's	1-06
2010	GAL	Bearna/Na Forbacha	1-12	LEI	Carrick Hurling	1-09
2009	SLI	Calry/St. Joseph's	1-09	GAL	Skehana	0-10
2008	GAL	Skehana	3-12	SLI	Calry/St. Joseph's	2-11
2007	GAL	Sylane	0-12	ROS	Athleague	1-05
2006	GAL	Skehana	1-10	LEI	Carrick Hurling	0-06
2005	GAL	Skehana	5-10	LEI	Carrick Hurling	1-06
2004	ROS	Oran	1-08	GAL	Skehana	1-06

== Roll of Honour ==
=== By club ===
#	Club	County	Titles	Runners-up	Championships won	Championships runner-Up
1	Calry-St Joseph's	SLI	4	5	2009, 2012, 2013, 2016	2008, 2011, 2014, 2015, 2017
1	Easkey	SLI	4	1	2022, 2023, 2024, 2025	2021
1	Sylane	GAL	4	0	2007, 2015, 2017, 2026	—
3	Skehana	GAL	3	3	2005, 2006, 2008	2004, 2009, 2012
5	Carrick Hurling	LEI	1	3	2018	2005, 2006, 2010
5	Oran	ROS	1	0	2004	—
5	Bearna/Na Forbacha	GAL	1	0	2010	—
5	Ballygar	GAL	1	2	2011	2018, 2022
5	Annaghdown	GAL	1	0	2014	—
5	Míchael Breathnach	GAL	1	0	2019	—
5	Salthill-Knocknacarra	GAL	1	0	2021	—
12	Ballinasloe	GAL	0	3	—	2023, 2024, 2025
12	Athleague	ROS	0	1	—	2007
12	An Spidéal	GAL	0	1	—	2013
12	Mícheál Breathnach	GAL	0	1	—	2016
12	Naomh Eoin	SLI	0	2	—	2019, 2026

=== By county ===
County	Titles	Runners-up	Total	Most recent success
Galway	12	10	22	2026
Sligo	8	8	16	2025
Leitrim	1	3	4	2018
Roscommon	1	1	2	2004
Mayo	0	0	0	None

== Records and statistics ==
=== County representatives ===
Year	Galway	Leitrim	Mayo	Sligo
2021	Salthill–Knocknacarra	Cluainín Iomáint	n/a	Easkey
2022	Ballygar	Carrick	n/a	Easkey
2023	Ballinasloe	Carrick	n/a	Easkey
2024	Ballinasloe	Carrick	n/a	Easkey
2025	Ballinasloe	Cluainín Iomáint	Moytura	Easkey
2026	Sylane	Carrick	Moytura	Naomh Eoin

=== Top scorers ===
==== All time ====
As of match played 2 November 2025

Rank	Top scorer	Team	Score	Total
1	Keith Raymond	Calry/St Joseph's	4-102	114
1	Andrew Kilcullen	Easkey	6-96	114

==== By year ====
Year	Top scorer	Team	Score	Total
2008	Keith Raymond	Calry/St Joseph's	1-17	20
2009	Keith Raymond	Calry/St Joseph's	0-05	5
2010	Clement Cunniffe	Carrick	0-05	5
2011	Keith Raymond	Calry/St Joseph's	0-12	12
2012	Keith Raymond	Calry/St Joseph's	1-14	17
2013	Keith Raymond	Calry/St Joseph's	1-13	16
2014	Keith Raymond	Calry/St Joseph's	0-10	10
2015	Keith Raymond	Calry/St Joseph's	1-10	13
2016	Keith Raymond	Calry/St Joseph's	0-11	11
2017	Keith Raymond	Calry/St Joseph's	0-10	10
2018	Clement Cunniffe	Carrick	1-14	17
2019	Tony O'Kelly Lynch	Naomh Eoin	0-13	13
2020	No championship			
2021	Andrew Kilcullen	Easkey	0-13	13
2022	Andrew Kilcullen	Easkey	2-18	24
2023	Andrew Kilcullen	Easkey	1-24	27
2024	Andrew Kilcullen	Easkey	1-23	26
2025	Cathal O'Hanlon	Ballinasloe	2-22	28

== See also ==
- Connacht Senior Club Hurling Championship (Tier 1)
- Connacht Intermediate Club Hurling Championship (Tier 2)
- All-Ireland Junior Club Hurling Championship
  - Munster Junior Club Hurling Championship
  - Leinster Junior Club Hurling Championship
  - Ulster Junior Club Hurling Championship
