= Carlow Intermediate Hurling Championship =

Annual hurling competition for intermediate clubs in Carlow

- Irish: Craobh Idirmheánach Iomáint Cheatharlach
- Code: Hurling
- Founded: 1984; 42 years ago
- Region: Carlow (GAA)
- Trophy: Pat Foley Cup
- No. of teams: 7
- Title holders: Carlow Town (3rd title)
- Most titles: Naomh Eoin (9 titles)
- Sponsors: JJ Kavanagh and Sons
- Official website: Carlow GAA

The Carlow Intermediate Hurling Championship (known for sponsorship reasons as the JJ Kavanagh Intermediate Hurling Championship and abbreviated to the Carlow IHC) is an annual hurling competition organised by the Carlow County Board of the Gaelic Athletic Association from 1984 for the second tier hurling teams in the county of Carlow in Ireland.

In its current format, the Carlow Intermediate Championship begins with a group stage in mid-summer. The five participating club teams play each other in a round-robin system. The four top-ranking teams proceed to the knockout phase that culminates with the final match at Netwatch Cullen Park. The winner of the Carlow Intermediate Championship qualifies for the subsequent Leinster Club Championship.

The title has been won by 14 different clubs, nine of which have won the title more than once. Naomh Eoin is the most successful team in the tournament's history, having won it nine times. Carlow Town are the title holders after defeating Burren Rangers by 4–18 to 0–16 in the 2026 final.

== Format ==
=== Group stage ===
Six clubs start in the group stage. Over the course of the group stage, each team plays once against the others in the group, resulting in each team being guaranteed five group games. Two points are awarded for a win, one for a draw and zero for a loss. The teams are ranked in the group stage table by points gained, then scoring difference and then their head-to-head record. The top four teams qualify for the knockout stage

=== Knockout stage ===
Following the completion of the group stage, the teams from the group are ranked (1-4) in terms of points accumulated and scoring difference. The two top-ranking teams receive byes to separate semi-finals.

Semi-finals: The tip four teams from the group stage contest this round. First place plays fourth place and second place plays third place The two winners from these two games advance to the final.

Final: The two semi-final winners contest the final. The winning team are declared champions.

=== Promotion ===
At the end of the championship, the winning team is automatically promoted to the Carlow Senior Hurling Championship for the following season.

=== Relegation ===
The bottom-placed team from the group stage is relegated to the Carlow Junior Hurling Championship.

=== Qualification ===
At the end of the championship, the winning team qualify to the subsequent Leinster Intermediate Club Hurling Championship.

== Teams ==
=== 2026 Teams ===
Seven clubs were competing in the 2026 Carlow Intermediate Hurling Championship:

Team	Location	Colours	Position in 2026	In championship since	Championship titles	Last championship title
Bagenalstown Gaels	Bagenalstown	Green and black	Semi-Finals	2026	1	2019
Burren Rangers	Ballon, Kilbride, & Rathtoe	Green and white	Finalist	2025	0	N/A
Carlow Town	Carlow	White and blue	Champion	?	3	2026
Kildavin/Clonegal	Clonegal & Kildavin	Red and black		2024	4	2003
Mount Leinster Rangers	Ballymurphy, Borris & Rathanna	Black and red	Semi-Finals	?	7	2016
Naomh Eoin	Myshall	Black and amber		?	11	2022
St Mullins	St Mullins	Green and white		?	8	2024

== Qualification for subsequent competitions ==
At the end of the championship, the winning team qualify to the subsequent Leinster Intermediate Club Hurling Championship.

== Roll of honour ==
=== By club ===
#	Club	Titles	Championships won
1	Naomh Eoin	9	1995, 2000, 2001, 2002, 2004, 2008, 2018, 2020, 2022
2	Mount Leinster Rangers	7	1988, 1996, 2007, 2009, 2014, 2015, 2016
2	St Mullin's	7	1998, 1999, 2006, 2010, 2012, 2023, 2024
4	Kildavin/Clonegal	4	1989, 1991, 1997, 2003
5	Naomh Bríd	3	2017, 2021, 2025
5	Carlow Town	3	2011, 2013, 2026
7	Parnells	2	1984, 1987
7	Ballinkillen	2	1990, 1994
7	Erin's Own	2	1993, 2005
10	Palatine	1	1985
10	Ballymurphy	1	1986
10	St Fintan's	1	1992
10	St Vincent's	1	1997
10	Bagenalstown Gaels	1	2019

== List of finals ==
=== Legend ===
- Gold – Leinster junior club champions
- Silver – Leinster junior club runners-up

=== List of Carlow IHC finals ===
Year	Winners		Runners-up		Venue	#
Year	Club	Score	Club	Score	Venue	#
2026	Carlow Town	4-18	Burren Rangers	0-16	Netwatch Cullen Park	
2025	Naomh Bríd	2-17	Mount Leinster Rangers	1-12	Netwatch Cullen Park	
2024	St Mullin's	2-15	Mount Leinster Rangers	0-10	Netwatch Cullen Park	
2023	St Mullin's	0-15	Mount Leinster Rangers	1-10	Netwatch Cullen Park	
2022	Naomh Eoin	0-12	Mount Leinster Rangers	0-06	Netwatch Cullen Park	
2021	Naomh Bríd	0-17	Naomh Eoin	1-12	Netwatch Cullen Park	
2020	Naomh Eoin	3-17	Mount Leinster Rangers	1-19	Netwatch Cullen Park	
2019	Bagenalstown Gaels	0-12	Mount Leinster Rangers	0-06	Netwatch Cullen Park	
2018	Naomh Eoin	1-11	Mount Leinster Rangers	1-08	Netwatch Cullen Park	
2017	Naomh Bríd	3-07	Mount Leinster Rangers	0-15	Netwatch Cullen Park	
2016	Mount Leinster Rangers	3-19	Carlow Town	0-18	Netwatch Cullen Park	
2015	Mount Leinster Rangers	0-14, 0-14 (R)	Naomh Eoin	1-11, 1-09 (R)		
2014	Mount Leinster Rangers	1-12, 1-12 (R)	Naomh Eoin	2-09, 0-07 (R)		
2013	Carlow Town	0-12	Mount Leinster Rangers	0-07		
2012	St Mullin's	1-10, 1-11 (R)	Mount Leinster Rangers	1-10, 1-10 (R)		
2011	Carlow Town	1-08, 2-09 (R)	Mount Leinster Rangers	0-11, 0-07 (R)		
2010	St Mullin's	2-09	Naomh Eoin	1-08		
2009	Mount Leinster Rangers	0-07	Naomh Bríd	0-06		
2008	Naomh Eoin	0-13	Palatine	1-05		
2007	Mount Leinster Rangers	2-15	Kildavin	0-05		
2006	St Mullin's	2-12	Palatine	1-12		
2005	Erin's Own	1-07	St Mullin's	0-03		
2004	Naomh Eoin	4-12	Palatine	3-11		
2003	Kildavin	4-09	St Mullin's	1-07		
2002	Naomh Eoin	4-08	Kildavin	1-06		
2001	Naomh Eoin	0-10, 0-09 (R)	St Mullin's	1-07, 1-04 (R)		
2000	Naomh Eoin	0-11, 1-11 (R)	Naomh Bríd	1-08, 0-09 (R)		
1999	St Mullin's	2-09	Naomh Eoin	0-14		
1998	St Mullin's	6-06	Naomh Bríd	1-06		
1997	St Vincent's	2-12	Naomh Bríd	2-10		
1996	Mount Leinster Rangers	1-11	Naomh Eoin	1-05		
1995	Naomh Eoin	2-10, 2-08 (R)	St Mullin's	4-04, 1-03 (R)		
1994	Ballinkillen	2-07	Naomh Eoin	0-09		
1993	Erin's Own	1-09	Naomh Eoin	1-02		
1992	St Fintan's	3-09	St Mullin's	0-02		
1991	Kildavin	2-09	Erin's Own	1-11		
1990	Ballinkillen	1-10	Carlow Town	0-06		
1989	Kildavin	4-13	Carlow Town	0-06		
1988	Mount Leinster Rangers	6-10	St Mullin's	0-03		
1987	Parnells	2-13	Erin's Own	1-08		
1986	Ballymurphy	1-10	Parnells	1-07		
1985	Palatine	3-07	Borris	1-10		
1984	Parnells	4-06	Palatine	1-07		

=== Notes ===
- 2018: The first match ended in a draw: Naomh Eoin 1–09 — 1–09 Mount Leinster Rangers.

== 2025 Carlow Intermediate Hurling Championship ==
=== Group stage table ===
Knockout stage Relegated

Team	Matches				Score			Pts
Team	Pld	W	D	L	For	Against	Diff	Pts
Naomh Bríd	6	5	1	0	130	73	57	11
Mount Leinster Rangers	6	4	0	2	133	129	4	8
Carlow Town	4	2	0	2	134	131	3	8
Burren Rangers	6	3	1	2	90	73	17	7
Kildavin/Clonegal	6	1	1	4	112	139	−27	3
St Mullin's	6	1	1	4	69	107	−47	3
Naomh Eoin	6	1	0	5	56	70	−14	2

Note: The scores from the following matches are unavailable; Burren Rangers vs Naomh Eoin, Naomh Eoin vs Naomh Bríd, Naomh Eoin vs St. Mullin's, St Mullin's vs Burren Rangers

21 June 2025 Round 1	Burren Rangers	0–23 – 4–13	Carlow Town	Kilbride GFC
18:00				Referee: Shane Foley

21 June 2025 Round 1	Mount Leinster Rangers	4–16 – 2–16	Naomh Eoin	Kilcoltrim Grounds
		Report		Referee: Sean McCormack

25 June 2025 Round 1	Naomh Bríd	4–20 – 0–11	St Mullin's	The Superbowl

28 June 2025 Round 2	Carlow Town	2–17 – 2–12	Kildavin/Clonegal	Oak Park Road
18:00			P. Ryan 0-7, D. Murphy 1-1, J. Nolan 0-3, J. Roberts 1-0, N. Hickey 0-1

28 July 2025 Round 2	Naomh Eoin	L – W	Naomh Bríd	Myshall

29 June 2025 Round 2	St Mullin's	L – W	Burren Rangers	Páirc Drummond

6 July 2025 Round 3	Burren Rangers	L – W	Naomh Eoin	Kilbride GFC
11:30

4 July 2025 Round 3	Kildavin/Clonegal	3–16 – 4–13	St Mullin's	Spellman Park
19:30

4 July 2025 Round 3	Naomh Bríd	2-17 – 0–11	Mount Leinster Rangers	The Superbowl
19:30

12 July 2025 Round 4	Naomh Eoin	2–09 – 0–17	Kildavin/Clonegal	Myshall
18:00

12 July 2025 Round 4	Mount Leinster Rangers	0–16 – 3–15	Burren Rangers	Kilcoltrim Grounds
				Referee: David Hickey

12 July 2025 Round 4	St Mullin's	1-16 – 4-14	Carlow Town	Páirc Drummond
18:00

19 July 2025 Round 5	Burren Rangers	1–19 – 3–13	Naomh Bríd	Kilbride GFC
18:00

18 July 2025 Round 5	Carlow Town	2–19 – 2–13	Naomh Eoin	Oak Park Road

29 July 2025 Round 5	Kildavin/Clonegal	3–16 – 3–21	Mount Leinster Rangers	Spellman Park
19:30	J. Nolan 3-3, P. Ryan 0-11, C. Hendrick 0-2, D. Murphy 0-1, N. Hickey 0-1

25 July 2025 Round 6	Mount Leinster Rangers	2–18 – 1–18	Carlow Town	Kilcoltrim Grounds
				Referee: David Hickey

25 July 2025 Round 6	Naomh Bríd	2-19 – 2–11	Kildavin/Clonegal	The Superbowl
19:30			P. Ryan 0-5, K. Sheppard 1-0, E. Murphy 1-0, A. Nolan 0-2, C. Murphy 0-2, C. Hendrick 0-1, N. Hickey 0-1

25 July 2025 Round 6	Naomh Eoin	L – W	St. Mullin's	Myshall

1 August 2025 Round 7	Carlow Town	0–14 – 2–22	Naomh Bríd	Oak Park Road

1 August 2025 Round 7	Kildavin/Clonegal	0–10 – 1–18	Burren Rangers	Spellman Park
19:30

1 August 2025 Round 7	St Mullin's	1-11 – 0-24	Mount Leinster Rangers	Páirc Drummond
19:30

== See also ==
- Carlow Senior Hurling Championship (Tier 1)
- Carlow Junior Hurling Championship (Tier 3)
- Carlow Junior Hurling Shield (Tier 4)
- Leinster Intermediate Club Hurling Championship
- Carlow Intermediate Football Championship
