= Pat Mulcahy (Limerick hurler) =

Irish hurler (1877–1963)

Personal information
- Native name: Pádraig Ó Maolcatha (Irish)
- Nickname: Mul
- Born: 24 November 1877 Cappamore, County Limerick, Ireland
- Died: 27 April 1963 (aged 85) Arbour Hill, Dublin, Ireland
- Occupation: Engineering foreman

Sport
- Sport: Hurling
- Position: Full-forward
Clubs
- Years: Club
- Cappamore; Commercials
Club titles
- Limerick titles: 5
Inter-county
- Years: County
- 1896-1898 1902-1908: Limerick; Dublin
Inter-county titles
- Munster titles: 1
- Leinster titles: 1
- All-Irelands: 1

Patrick Mulcahy (24 November 1877 – 27 April 1963) was an Irish hurler. His championship career with the Limerick and Dublin senior teams lasted from 1896 until 1908.

Born in Cappamore, County Limerick, Mulcahy first played competitive hurling in his youth. He was little more than a schoolchild when he was invited to play for the Murroe and Boher teams, however, he quickly established himself on the Cappamore team, winning a Murphy Cup medal in 1897. Mulcahy later played with the Commercials club in Dublin and won five county senior championship medals.

Mulcahy joined the Limerick senior team in 1896 and enjoyed much success during his brief tenure with the team. He was the full-forward on the team that won All-Ireland, Munster and Croke Cup titles in 1897. Mulcahy later joined the Dublin senior team and added a Leinster medal to his collection in 1902. He played his last inter-county match in May 1908.

== Honours ==
Cappamore

- Murphy Cup (1): 1897

Commercials

- Dublin Senior Hurling Championship (5): 1899, 1905, 1907, 1909, 1916

Limerick

- All-Ireland Senior Hurling Championship (1): 1897
- Munster Senior Hurling Championship (1): 1897
- Croke Cup (1): 1897

Dublin

- Leinster Senior Hurling Championship (1): 1902
