= John Doyle (Carlow hurler) =

Irish sportsperson

Personal information
- Native name: Seán Ó Dúil (Irish)
- Born: 1992 (age 33–34) Carlow, Ireland

Sport
- Sport: Hurling
- Position: Left corner-forward
Clubs
- Years: Club
- Carlow Town; O Loughlin Gaels
Club titles
- Carlow titles: 0
Inter-county*
Years	County	Apps (scores)
2011-	Carlow	1 (0-00)
Inter-county titles
- Leinster titles: 0
- All-Irelands: 0
- NHL: 0
- All Stars: 0
- *Inter County team apps and scores correct as of 13:51, 1 July 2011.

John Doyle (born 1992 in Carlow, Ireland) is an Irish sportsperson. He plays hurling with O Loughlin Gaels and has been a member of the Carlow senior inter-county team since 2011.

== Playing career ==
=== Club ===
Doyle currently plays his hurling in Kilkenny with O Loughlin gaels. However, Doyle started playing his club hurling with Carlow Town. After coming to prominence at underage levels he made his senior club championship debut as a fringe player in 2008. He has since become a key member of the team's full-forward line. However, in 2011 he decided to switch clubs to O loughlin Gaels in Kilkenny.

=== Inter-county ===
Doyle first played for Carlow at inter-county level as a member of the county's minor hurling team in 2009. That year Carlow qualified for the final of the Leinster Shield, however, they were defeated by Kildare. Doyle was still a member of the Carlow minor hurling team in 2010, however, the teams provincial campaign came to an end in the quarter-finals. He later joined the county's under-21 team.

Doyle made his senior championship debut in 2011 when he came on as a substitute in a defeat by Antrim in the All-Ireland qualifiers. In December 2011, Doyle was asked to play for Kilkenny seniors, however Doyle rejected the offer and decided to stick with Carlow.
