= Kildavin/Clonegal GAA =

Kildavin/Clonegal
- Cill Damháin/Cluain na nGall
- Founded: 1914
- County: Carlow
- Nickname: K/C
- Colours: Red and black
- Grounds: Spellman Park

Playing kits
Standard colours

Senior Club Championships
	All Ireland	Leinster champions	Carlow champions
Football:	0	0	3
Hurling:	0	0	0

Kildavin/Clonegal GAA is a Gaelic Athletic Association club located in the villages of Kildavin and Clonegal in County Carlow on the border with County Wexford in Ireland. The club fields teams in both hurling and Gaelic football. In 2027 Kildavin/Clonegal will compete at adult level in the Carlow Intermediate Hurling Championship and also in the Carlow Intermediate and Junior B Football Championships.

== History ==
The first record of organised Gaelic games in the parish was in 1888 when a Clonegal team featuring players from Kildavin was formed. Kildavin organised their own team in 1894. A game between the two sides in 1912 resulted in amalgamation discussions and the new Kildavin/Clonegal club was officially established on 26 May 1914. The teams have operated as individual clubs on a number of occasions since then, however, the united Kildavin/Clonegal club secured the Carlow IFC title in 1998, before winning the Carlow IHC title in 2003. The club won the Carlow JHC title in 2023.

== Grounds ==
Kildavin/Clonegal play the majority of their home matches at Spellman Park in Kildavin on the Carlow side of the border. The club uses Ben Mulhall Memorial Park just outside Clonegal on the Wexford side of the border for selected matches. In 2025 major redevlopment started in Ben Mulhall Park so that K/C could have 2 pitches that are able to host adult games. The redevelopment has seen dugouts, adult size goals, stop nets and a walking track installed. In the next few years there are plans to improve the playing surface and also to refurbish the club house.

== Rivalries ==
Kildavin/Clonegal share a bitter rivalry in gaelic football with neighbours Kilbride. In hurling the main rivals of Kildavin/Clonegal are Burren Rangers who are an amalgamation of three football clubs Ballon, Kilbride and The Fighting Cocks. The first year that Kildavin/Clonegal and Burren Rangers met in adult hurling was in 2023 with Burren Rangers winning out in the Bolger Shield and the Junior Hurling Championship round robin, the clubs met again in the JHC semi-final in Dr. Cullen Park where Kildavin/Clonegal defeated Burren Rangers by 2-15 to 1-15. K/C went on to win the final against Mount Leinster Rangers to earn promotion to the Carlow IHC. Burren Rangers bounced back from their derby disappointment in the 2023 semi-final to win 2024 JHC final and joined their rivals in the second tier for the following year. The first Intermediate meeting between the clubs came at Spellman Park in the 2025 IHC round robin where Burren Rangers won a match which saw the referee hand out 3 red cards. The clubs met again this time in the 2025 Under 16 Division 1B Hurling Championship final where Kildavin/Clonegal won by the minimum in a 3-09 to 3-08 victory.

== Honours ==
=== Football ===
- Carlow Senior Football Championship (3): 1966, 1970, 1973
- Carlow Intermediate Football Championship (1): 1998
- Carlow Junior Football Championship (4): 1957, 1976, 1980, 1985
- Carlow Under 16 Division 2 Football Championship (1): 2024
- Carlow Under 15 Division 2 Football Championship (1): 2023
- Carlow Féile Peil na nÓg Division 2 (1): 2023
- Carlow Under 14 Division 1B Football Championship (2): 2024, 2025

=== Hurling ===
- Carlow Senior Hurling Championship Semi-finalists (1): 1978
- Carlow Intermediate Hurling Championship (4): 1989, 1991, 1997, 2003
- Carlow Junior Hurling Championship (4): 1962, 1972, 1977, 2023
- Bolger Shield (1): 2024
- Carlow Under 21 Hurling Championship Runners-up (2): 1973, 1974
- Carlow Minor Hurling League (1): 1971
- Carlow Under 16 A Hurling Championship (1): 1983
- Carlow Under 16 Division 1B Hurling Championship (1): 2025
- Carlow Féile na nGael Division 2 (1): 2025
