= Brian Doyle (Carlow hurler) =

Irish sportsperson

Personal information
- Native name: Brian Ó Dubhaill (Irish)
- Born: 1989 (age 36–37) Bagenalstown, County Carlow, Ireland
- Occupation: Teacher (Presentation De La Salle Bagenalstown)

Sport
- Sport: Hurling
- Position: Midfield
Club
- Years: Club
- 2006-present: Bagenalstown Gaels
Club titles
- Carlow titles: 0
Inter-county*
Years	County	Apps (scores)
2011-	Carlow	1 (0-00)
Inter-county titles
- Leinster titles: 0
- All-Irelands: 0
- NHL: 0
- All Stars: 0
- *Inter County team apps and scores correct as of 15:49, 1 July 2011.

Brian Doyle (born 1989 in Bagenalstown, County Carlow, Ireland) is an Irish sportsperson. He plays hurling with his local club Erin's Own and has been a member of the Carlow senior inter-county team since 2011. He teaches English and Geography in Presentation De La Salle Bagenalstown. |title=Hurler profile: Brian Doyle |publisher=Hurling stats website |accessdate=1 July 2011

== Playing career ==
=== Club ===
Doyle plays his club hurling with the Erin's Own club in his home town. After coming to prominence at juvenile and underage levels he joined the club's senior team while he was still a minor.

In 2009 Doyle played in his first final of the county senior championship. It was Erin's Own first appearance in a championship decider since 1970. Mount Leinster Rangers provided the opposition and won by 1–13 to 1–11.

=== Inter-county ===
Doyle first played for Carlow as a member of the county's minor hurling team in 2006. It was a fairly successful year as the county reached their first Leinster final. Kilkenny provided the opposition and went on to crush Carlow by 4–22 to 1–5. Doyle was eligible for the minor grade again in 2007, however, Carlow exited the championship at an early stage. He later spent a number of years as a member of the Carlow under-21 team but enjoyed little success in this grade.

Doyle made his senior championship debut in 2011 when he was named at midfield in a defeat by Antrim in the All-Ireland qualifiers.
