= Carlow Town Hurling Club =

Irish Gaelic Athletic Association club

Carlow Town
- Baile Ceatharlach
- Founded: 1968
- County: Carlow
- Nickname: The Town
- Colours: White and blue
- Grounds: Oak Park Road
- Coordinates: 52°50′55″N 6°54′54″W

Playing kits
Standard colours

Senior Club Championships
	All Ireland	Leinster champions	Carlow champions
Hurling:	0	0	4

Carlow Town Hurling & Camogie Club is a Gaelic games club located in Carlow, Ireland. The club is solely concerned with the games of hurling and camogie.

== History ==
Hurling has been played in Carlow since the 19th century, with several clubs representing the town and enjoying success at various intervals. One of these clubs, the Pearses, won Carlow SHC titles in 1961 and 1963 before later disbanding. In 1968, a new club was reformed under the name Carlow Town Hurling Club.

The new club had success in the juvenile and underage grades, winning the Carlow U16HC title in 1974, the Carlow MHC title in 1975 and Carlow U21HC titles in 1976 and 1977. Carlow Town claimed their first Carlow SHC title after a defeat of St Finan's in 1977. Further SHC titles were claimed in 1979, 1980 and 1988.

== Grounds ==
The club play at grounds on Oak Park Road, immediately north of Dr. Cullen Park.

== Honours ==
- Carlow Senior Hurling Championship (4): 1977, 1979, 1980, 1988
- Carlow Intermediate Hurling Championship (3): 2011, 2013, 2026
- Carlow Junior Hurling Championship (4): 1979, 1988, 1999, 2004

== Notable players ==
- John Doyle
- Ruairí Dunbar
- Pierce Freaney
- Jimmy Phelan
