= Diarmaid Ó Dúlaing =

Irish hurler

Personal information
- Native name: Diarmaid Ó Dúlaing (Irish)
- Born: 2004 (age 21–22) Rathcoole, County Dublin, Ireland
- Occupation: Student

Sport
- Sport: Hurling
- Position: Right corner-forward
Club
- Years: Club
- 2022-present: Commercials
Club titles
- Dublin titles: 0
College
- Years: College
- University College Dublin
College titles
- Fitzgibbon titles: 0
Inter-county*
Years	County	Apps (scores)
2023-present	Dublin	5 (1-05)
Inter-county titles
- Leinster titles: 0
- All-Irelands: 0
- NHL: 0
- All Stars: 0
- *Inter County team apps and scores correct as of 21:06, 22 June 2025.

Diarmaid Ó Dúlaing (born 2004) is an Irish hurler. At club level he plays with Commercials and at inter-county level with the Dublin senior hurling team.

== Career ==
Ó Dúlaing first played hurling at juvenile and underage levels with the Commercials club. He simultaneously played as a schoolboy with Scoil Chrónáin. Ó Dúlaing subsequently progressed to adult level and won a Dublin JAHC title after a defeat of Lucan Sarsfields in 2022.

Ó Dúlaing first appeared on the inter-county scene with Dublin as a member of the minor team in 2021. He later spent three consecutive seasons with the under-20 team. Ó Dúlaing was drafted onto the senior team for the 2023 Walsh Cup.

== Personal life ==
Ó Dúlaing's grandfather, Donncha Ó Dúlaing, was a broadcaster with RTÉ.

== Career statistics ==
As of 21 June 2025

Team	Year	National League			Leinster		All-Ireland		Total	
Team	Year	Division	Apps	Score	Apps	Score	Apps	Score	Apps	Score
Dublin	2024	Division 1B	5	0-04	1	0-00	1	0-00	7	0-04
Dublin	2025	Division 1B	6	0-16	1	0-01	2	1-04	9	1-21
Career total			11	0-20	2	0-01	3	1-04	16	1-25

== Honours ==
Commercials

- Dublin Junior A Hurling Championship: 2022
