= Erin's Own GAA =

Erin's Own GAA may refer to:

- Erin's Own GAA (Carlow), a sports club in Bagenalstown, Ireland
- Erin's Own GAA (Cork), a sports club in Glounthuane, East Cork, Ireland
- Erin's Own GAA (Kilkenny), a sports club in Castlecomer, Ireland
- Erin's Own GAA (Waterford), a sports club in the Irish city of Waterford
