= Carlow Junior Hurling Championship =

Annual hurling competition for junior clubs in Carlow

- Irish: Craobh Sóisearach Iomáint Cheatharlach
- Code: Hurling
- Founded: 1960; 66 years ago
- Region: Carlow (GAA)
- Trophy: Martin Grennan Cup
- No. of teams: 8
- Title holders: Ballinkillen (7th title)
- Sponsors: JJ Kavanagh and Sons
- Official website: Carlow GAA

The Carlow Junior Hurling Championship (known for sponsorship reasons as the JJ Kavanagh and Sons Junior Hurling Championship and abbreviated to the Carlow JHC) is an annual hurling competition organised by the Carlow County Board of the Gaelic Athletic Association for the third tier hurling teams in the county of Carlow in Ireland.

In its current format, the Carlow Intermediate Championship begins with a group stage. The six participating club teams play each other in a round-robin system. The four top-ranking teams proceed to the knockout phase that culminates with the final match at Netwatch Cullen Park.

Ballinkillen are the title holders after defeating Bagenalstown Gaels by 2-18 to 1-10 in the 2026 final.

== History ==
When Carlow's top tier hurling competition was granted senior status in 1960, a new Junior Hurling Championship was created. This was Carlow's second tier competition until 1984 when it became the third tier competition after the creation of the Intermediate Hurling Championship.

== Format ==
=== Group stage ===
Seven clubs start in the group stage. Over the course of the group stage, each team plays once against the others in the group, resulting in each team being guaranteed six group games and one bye round. Two points are awarded for a win, one for a draw and zero for a loss. The teams are ranked in the group stage table by points gained, then scoring difference and then their head-to-head record. The top four teams qualify for the knockout stage.

=== Knockout stage ===
Semi-finals: The top four teams from the group stage contest this round. First place plays fourth place and second place plays third place. The two winners from these two games advance to the final.

Final: The two semi-final winners contest the final. The winning team are declared champions.

=== Promotion ===
At the end of the championship, the winning team is automatically promoted to the Carlow Intermediate Hurling Championship for the following season.

== Teams ==
=== 2026 Teams ===
Eight teams were competing in the 2026 Carlow Junior Hurling Championship:

Team	Location	Colours	Position in 2026	In championship since	Championship titles	Last championship title
Ballinkillen	Ballinkillen	Blue and gold	Champion	2022	7	2026
Burren Rangers	Kilbride	Green and white		2025	1	2024
Carlow Town	Carlow	White and blue		?	4	2004
Mount Leinster Rangers	Borris	Black and red		?	2	2006
Naomh Bríd	Leighlinbridge	Maroon and white		?	1	2007
Naomh Eoin	Myshall	Black and amber		2026	8	2016
Setanta	Carlow	Purple, green and gold		2025	0	—
St Mullin's	St Mullin's	Green and white	Runners-up	?	7	2022

== Qualification for subsequent competitions ==
At the end of the championship, the winning team qualify to the subsequent Leinster Junior Club Hurling Championship.

== Trophy and medals ==
The Martin Grennan Cup is the current prize for winning the championship. It was presented in June 2023 in memory of Martin Grennan who was a member of the St Mullin's club. Joint-captains Ian St Ledger and Pádraig Ryan from the Kildavin/Clonegal club were the first recipients of the cup. In accordance with GAA rules, the County Board awards a set of gold medals to the championship winners.

== List of finals ==
=== List of Carlow JHC finals ===
Year	Winners		Runners-up		Venue	#
Year	Club	Score	Club	Score	Venue	#
2026	Ballinkillen	2-18	St Mullin's	1-10	Netwatch Cullen Park	
2025	Bagenalstown Gaels	1-11	Ballinkillen	0-13	Netwatch Cullen Park	
2024	Burren Rangers	1-18	Mount Leinster Rangers	2-10	Netwatch Cullen Park	
2023	Kildavin/Clonegal	1-18	Mount Leinster Rangers	1-07	Netwatch Cullen Park	
2022	St Mullin's	3-09	Burren Rangers	2-07	Netwatch Cullen Park	
2021	Bagenalstown Gaels	2-15	Palatine	1-09		
2020	Ballinkillen	1-14	Burren Rangers	0-05		
2019	St Mullin's	1-12	Bagenalstown Gaels	0-09		
2018	Palatine	4-10	St Patrick's	0-08		
2017	Palatine	4-17	Erin's Own	0-07		
2016	Naomh Eoin	3-13	Ballinkillen	1-08		
2015	Naomh Eoin	2-14	St Patrick's	0-11		
2014	Erin's Own	1-16	Naomh Bríd	1-07		
2013	Palatine	4-13	St Mullin's	1-06		
2012	Ballinkillen	0-08	Palatine	1-03		
2010–2011	No Competition					
2009	St Patrick's	0-12	Erin's Own	2-04		
2008	Ballinkillen	0-17	Erin's Own	2-10		
2007	Naomh Bríd	1-16	Carlow Town	0-12		
2006	Mount Leinster Rangers	2-13	Erin's Own	0-08		
2005	Ballinkillen	2-05	Mount Leinster Rangers	2-01		
2004	Carlow Town	0-09, 1-14 (R, aet)	Erin's Own	0,09, 2-09 (R, aet)		
2003	Naomh Eoin	1-08, 1-08 (R)	Mount Leinster Rangers	1-08, 0-08 (R)		
2002	St Mullin's	1-10	Erin's Own	1-04		
2001	Palatine	4-07	Mount Leinster Rangers	2-08		
2000	Naomh Eoin	0-10	St Mullin's	1-06		
1999	Carlow Town	3-07	St Mullin's	2-08		
1998	Ballinkillen	2-08	St Mullin's	1-09		
1997	Erin's Own	2-09, 3-05 (R)	Carlow Town	2-09, 0-02 (R)		
1996	Mount Leinster Rangers	3-11	Rathvilly	1-05		
1995	Kildavin	1-10	St Mullin's	0-02		
1994	Erin's Own	3-15	Carlow Town	3-05		
1993	St Mullin's	2-04	Erin's Own	2-02		
1992	Naomh Eoin	3-11	Rathvilly	1-13		
1991	St Mullin's	0-08	Naomh Eoin	0-05		
1990	Palatine	2-06	Naomh Eoin	1-08		
1989	Kevin Barry's	2-05	St Fintan's	2-03		
1988	Carlow Town	4-07	Kevin Barry's	0-05		
1987	Kildavin	5-10	St Mullin's	1-02		
1986	St Mullin's	2-08, 2-06 (R), 2-05 (R2)	Kildavin	1-11, 1-09 (R), 0-04 (R2)		
1985	Erin's Own	1-08, 6-07 (R)	Kildavin	0-11, 2-14 (R)		
1984	Naomh Eoin	1-05	St Mullin's	1-04		
1983	Palatine	2-08	Kildavin	2-07		
1982	Naomh Eoin	3-08	Erin's Own	2-07		
1981	Parnells	2-05	Naomh Eoin	3-01		
1980	Borris	3-09	Erin's Own	1-03		
1979	Carlow Town	6-02	Borris	4-05		
1978	St Mullin's	4-04	Borris	2-08		
1977	Kildavin	9-12	Borris	2-03		
1976	Tullow	3-07	Kildavin	2-06		
1975	St Lazerians	2-11	Ballon	2-04		
1974	Ballymurphy	1-14	Kildavin	0-13		
1973	St Fintans	4-06	St Lazerians	2-04		
1972	Kildavin	4-02	St Anne's (Nurney)	0-04		
1971	Ballinkillen	8-16	Kildavin	4-09		
1970	Palatine	3-13	Kildavin	2-08		
1969	Borris	5-07	Tullow	2-08		
1968	Naomh Eoin	5-06	St Fintans	0-02		
1967	Borris	5-11	Naomh Eoin	2-06		
1966	St Fintans	2-12	Erin's Own	3-04		
1965	Palatine	2-13	Myshall-Ballinree United	0-03		
1964	Leighlinbridge	3-07	Ballinkillen	0-05		
1963	Erin's Own	7-07	St Matthews	2-02		
1962	St Vincents	2-04, Awarded Title (R)	Ballinkillen	2-04		
1961	Erin's Own	5-02	St Vincents	2-01		
1960	Cournellan	5-06	St Mullin's	0-00		

== Roll of Honour ==
Team	Number of titles	Years won
Palatine	8	1965, 1970, 1983, 1990, 2001, 2013, 2017, 2018
Naomh Eoin	8	1968, 1982, 1984, 1992, 2000, 2003 , 2015, 2016
St Mullin's	7	1978, 1986, 1991, 1993, 2002, 2019, 2022
Ballinkillen	7	1971, 1998, 2005, 2008, 2012, 2020, 2026
Erin's Own	6	1961, 1963, 1985, 1994, 1997, 2014
St. Vincents / Kildavin / Kildavin Clonegal	6	1962,1972,1977, 1987, 1995, 2023
Carlow Town	4	1979, 1988, 1999, 2004
Borris	3	1967, 1969, 1980
St Fintans	2	1966, 1973
Mount Leinster Rangers	2	1996, 2006
St Patricks / Tullow	2	1976, 2009
Bagenalstown Gaels	2	2021, 2025
Cournellan	1	1960
Leighlinbridge	1	1964
Ballymurphy	1	1974
St Lazerians	1	1975
Parnells	1	1981
Kevin Barrys	1	1989
Naomh Bríd	1	2007
Burren Rangers	1	2024

== See also ==
- Carlow Senior Hurling Championship (Tier 1)
- Carlow Intermediate Hurling Championship (Tier 2)
- Carlow Junior Hurling Shield (Tier 4)
