= 1915 Dublin Senior Hurling Championship =

Annual hurling competition season

- Champions: Faughs (10th title)
- Runners-up: Thomas Davis

The 1915 Dublin Senior Hurling Championship was the 28th staging of the Dublin Senior Hurling Championship since its establishment by the Dublin County Board in 1887.

Faughs entered the championship as the defending champions.

The final was played on 13 June 1915 at Croke Park in Dublin, between Faughs and Thomas Davis, in what was their first ever meeting in the final. Faughs won the match by 9–05 to 2–05 to claim their 10th championship title overall and a second consecutive title.

== Results ==
=== Final ===
13 June 1915 Final	Faughs	9-05 - 2-05	Thomas Davis	Croke Park
