= Andrew Kilcullen =

Irish hurler and Gaelic footballer

Personal information
- Born: 18 March 2000 (age 26) Easkey, County Sligo, Ireland

Sport
- Sport: Hurling
- Position: Full-forward
Club
- Years: Club
- Easkey
Club titles
- Sligo titles: 6
Inter-county
- Years: County
- 2019–: Sligo
Inter-county titles
- Connacht titles: 0
- All-Irelands: 0
- NHL: 0
- All Stars: 0

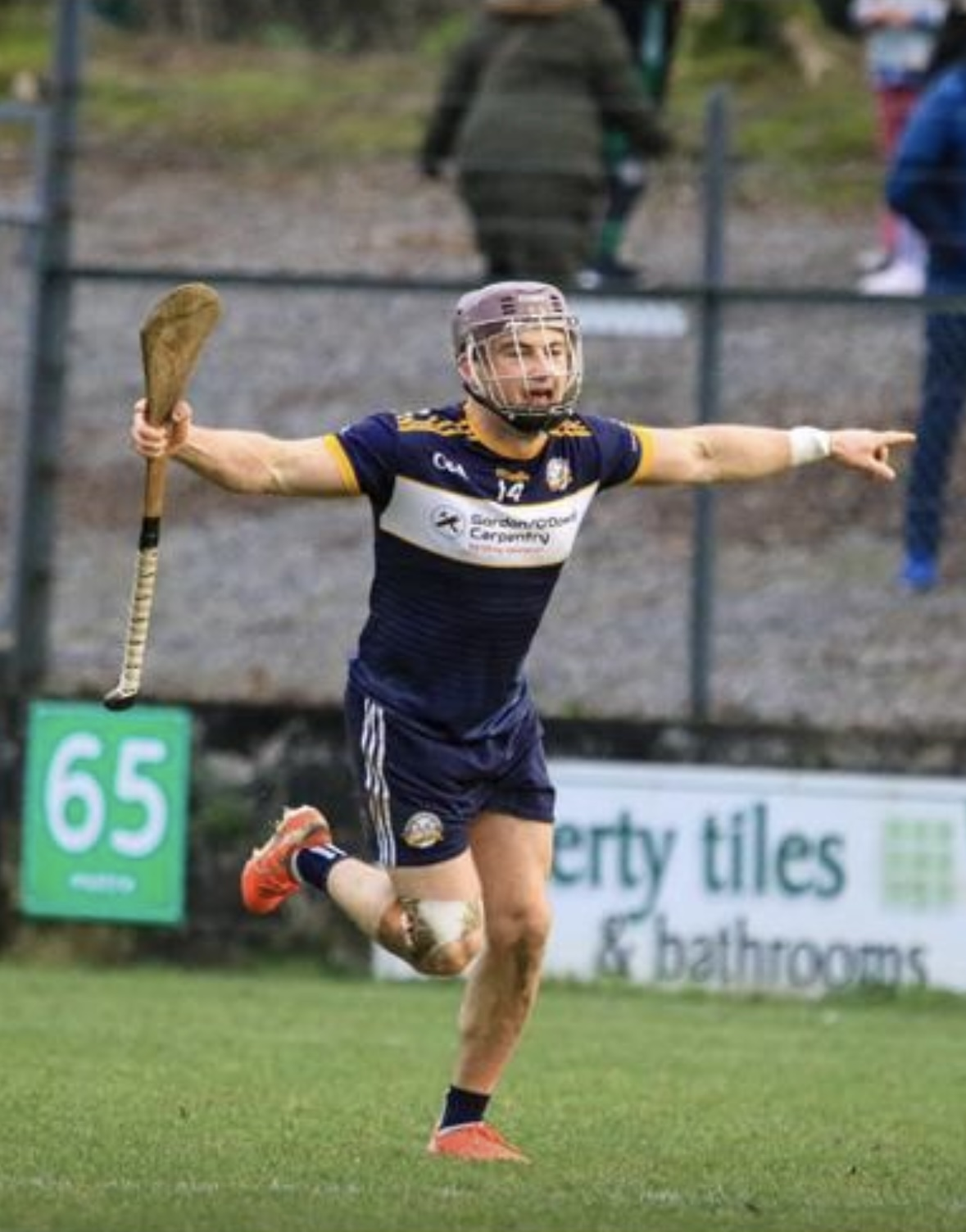

Andrew Kilcullen (born 18 March 2000) is a dual player of Gaelic games, i.e. hurling and Gaelic football, who plays for Sligo Championship club Easkey and at inter-county level for the Sligo senior hurling team.

Born in Easkey, County Sligo, Kilcullen first played competitive football and hurling at juvenile and underage levels with the Easkey club. He was a part of the club's senior hurling team who after an absence of a number of years reformed in 2018, and he has won six Sligo Senior Hurling Championship medals with Easkey since then. He also helped his club to its first Connacht Junior Club Hurling Championship in 2022, scoring the winning point in the final, and also helped his club reach the All-Ireland Junior Club Hurling Championship final. Kilcullen was also the top scorer in the 2022–23 All-Ireland Junior Club Hurling Championship, scoring 4–32 across four games. Andrew was named as the 2026 Nicky Rackard Cup Player of the Year after finishing top scoerer in the competition for the 2nd year in succession while also been named on the Ring, Rackard & Meaghar Team of the Year in both 2022 and 2026.

== Honours ==
Easkey

- Sligo Senior Hurling Championship (6): 2020, 2021, 2022, 2023, 2024, 2025
- Connacht Junior Club Hurling Championship (4): 2022, 2023, 2024, 2025
- Sligo Intermediate Football Championship: 2023
- Sligo Junior Football Championship: 2018
- Connacht Junior Club Football Championship: 2018

Sligo

- Nicky Rackard Cup: 2019
- Division 3A: 2021
- Division 3B: 2020

Awards

- 2022 Christy Ring Cup: Champions 15
- 2026 Nicky Rackard Cup Champions 15
- 2026 Nicky Rackard Cup Player of the Year
