= The Banner GAA =

Gaelic football club in Ennis, County Clare, Ireland

The Banner
- Club na mBratach
- Founded: 1977
- County: Clare
- Colours: Saffron and yellow
- Grounds: Shanaway Road, Ennis
- Coordinates: 52°50′24″N 9°01′18″W

Playing kits
Standard colours

Senior Club Championships
	All Ireland	Munster champions	Clare champions
Football:	-	-	0
Hurling:	-	-	0
Ladies' football:	–	1	14

The Banner GAA is a Gaelic Athletic Association club located in Ennis, County Clare, Ireland. The club fields teams in both hurling and Gaelic football.

== History ==
Located on the Shanaway Road on the outskirts of Ennis, County Clare, the Banner GAA club was founded in 1977. The club has spent most of its existence operating in the junior grade.

The Banner's Ladies' Gaelic football team won the Munster Ladies' Senior Club Football Championship in 2013.

In 2017, the club's 40th anniversary year, the men's hurling and football teams claimed a double of junior titles. Further success was claimed in 2020 when the club claimed another double. The winning of the Clare JAFC title that year secured intermediate status for the club for the first time in their history. The Banner also represented Clare in the 2022 Munster Club JHC.

== Honours ==
=== Gaelic football ===
- Clare Intermediate Football Championship (2): 2026
- Clare Junior A Football Championship (1): 2020
- Clare Junior B Football Championship (1): 2017

=== Hurling ===
- Clare Junior A Hurling Championship (1): 2025
- Clare Junior B Hurling Championship (1): 2020
- Clare Junior C Hurling Championship] (1): 2017

=== Ladies football ===
- Munster Senior Club Ladies Football Championship (1): 2013
- Clare Senior Ladies Football Championship (14): 2008, 2009, 2011, 2012, 2013, 2014, 2015, 2016, 2017, 2018, 2020, 2021, 2022, 2023
- Clare Intermediate Ladies Football Championship (1): 2004

== Notable players ==
- Shane Meehan
