= Commercials GAA (Dublin) =

Irish Gaelic Athletic Association club

Commercials
- Na Tráchtálaí
- Founded: 1886
- County: Dublin
- Colours: Red and green
- Grounds: Dawson Park, Rathcoole
- Coordinates: 53°17′06″N 6°27′34″W

Playing kits
Standard colours

Senior Club Championships
	All Ireland	Leinster champions	Dublin champions
Hurling:	0	0	9

Commercials Hurling & Camogie Club is a Gaelic Athletic Association club located in Rathcoole, County Dublin, Ireland. The club is concerned with the games of hurling and camogie.

== History ==
Commercials Hurling Club was established in 1886. The club was home to the many bar and shop workers who had moved from to Dublin from rural Ireland seeking employment. The club first played their matches in Dublin city centre and, like a lot of clubs at the time, they trained in the Phoenix Park.

The club was less than a decade in existence when Commercials claimed its first Dublin SHC in 1895. It was the first of a record five successive titles. In all, Commercials won nine titles in the first 30 years of their existence. Successes in the lower grades was also achieved, with Dublin IHC and Dublin JHC titles being secured on a number of occasions.

== Honours ==
- Dublin Senior Hurling Championship (9): 1895, 1896, 1897, 1898, 1899, 1905, 1907, 1909, 1916
- Dublin Premier Intermediate Hurling Championship (1): 2025
- Dublin Intermediate Hurling Championship (6): 1928, 1932, 1964, 1977, 1991, 2024
- Dublin Junior Hurling Championship (3): 1899, 1925, 1940, 2022

== Notable players ==
- Pat Mulcahy
