= Ballinasloe GAA =

Gaelic sports club in County Galway, Ireland

- CLG Bhéal Átha na Sluaighe
- Founded: 2005
- County: Galway
- Colours: Black and Amber
- Grounds: Dunlo GAA Grounds
- Coordinates: 53°19′51.01″N 8°13′42.69″W

Playing kits
Standard colours

Ballinasloe GAA (Irish: CLG Bhéal Átha na Sluaighe) is a Gaelic football and hurling club based in Ballinasloe, County Galway, in the west of Ireland. It is a member of the Galway GAA branch of the Gaelic Athletic Association.

== Club history ==
It was formed on 1 December 2005 as the result of a merger of St Grellan's GFC and Ballinasloe Hurling Club. Ballinasloe's first ever hurling game took place on The Fair Green on Easter Monday 1884 between Killimor and Eyrecourt. Since this date Gaelic Games have been a pillar in Ballinasloe's society. Since the games’ inception its popularity in Ballinasloe has been integral to its success. The first football game in Ballinasloe GAA's successful history took place on 31 March 1893 in a field in Pollboy. The game was between Creagh and Ballinasloe. Ballinasloe was captained by Thomas Cunningham and Creagh by T.F Burke. Creagh came out on top in a low scoring game of 2–01 to 1 point.

Late that year in June 1893, Ballinasloe fulfilled another fixture where they were welcomed out to Kiltormer to take on Killoran in a Gaelic football game under GAA rules.

Ballinasloe's association with Gaelic games can be traced back beyond an inaugural meeting of the GAA which was held in Thurles on 1 November 1884; on an earlier date in 1884, Killimor and the Dublin Metropolitan Hurling team played a hurling challenge in Ballinasloe and included in that Dublin team was Michael Cusack who later in the same year, was to be a founder member of the association. In 1889, Ballinasloe had a football club with J.F. Gibney as captain. Despite the Parnell crisis, the Galway Football Championship for 1891 was played and Ballinasloe participated, playing Mountbellew in Ahascragh on 24 May of that year. In 1892, P.D. Brennan of Ballinasloe became Assistant County Secretary.

Up to 1913 the Ballinasloe club had not enjoyed success on the field of play. Between 1887 and 1912, Tuam won twelve County Titles, Dunmore won eight, other winners being Loughrea and Athenry while Ballinasloe was without a title.

In 1931, Joe Kelleher led Galway to All Ireland victory in the Junior Championship.

Ballinasloe GAA has enjoyed continued success at all levels in both hurling and football. It has seen many of its members see the maroon and white of Galway. It continues to participate at a high level and with the amalgamation of hurling and football codes, development of their new facilities and recent announcement of further development.

Ballinasloe won the 2012–13 All-Ireland Junior Club Football Championship, defeating Kenmare Shamrocks of Kerry 0–14 to 0–10 in the final at Croke Park on 24 February 2013 to claim the club’s first All-Ireland title at this grade."2012–13 All-Ireland Junior Club Football Championship". Wikipedia."Ballinasloe retain silverware for Galway with win over Kenmare Shamrocks". Irish Examiner."2012–13 All-Ireland Junior Club Football Championship". Wikipedia.

Between 2023 and 2025, Ballinasloe GAA experienced a highly successful period in hurling at junior level, establishing themselves as one of the leading clubs in Galway in that grade. In 2023, the club won both the Galway Junior B and Galway Junior 1 Hurling Championships, defeating Killimordaly and Salthill/Knocknacarra respectively, before going on to claim the Leinster Junior B Club Championship later that season."Ballinasloe crowned Junior B, Junior 1 and Leinster champions". ballinasloe.gaa.ie. 2023.

The club maintained its strong form in subsequent seasons, securing further Galway Junior 1 county titles in 2024 and 2025, completing a historic three-in-a-row at that grade with victory over Kiltormer in the 2025 final."Clinical Ballinasloe complete the three-in-a-row in Junior 1". Connacht Tribune. 2025.

At provincial level, Ballinasloe reached the Connacht Junior Club Hurling Championship finals on multiple occasions during this period, finishing runners-up after narrow defeats to Easkey of Sligo in both the 2024 and 2025 finals."More final heartbreak for Ballinasloe in Connacht Junior Championship". Connacht Tribune. 2025.

== Notable players ==
- Michael John Flaherty (1953 National Hurling League Winning Captain with Galway)
- Keith Kildea (2008) transferred over from clann na gael
- Seán Meade (3-in-a-row All-Ireland Senior Football Champion with Galway)
- Séamus Shinnors (1979 All-Ireland Senior Hurling Finalist with Galway)

== Honours ==
Football:

- All-Ireland Junior Club Football Championship: 2013
- Connacht Junior Club Football Championship: 2012
- Galway Junior Football Championship: 2012
- Galway Junior North Football Championship: 2010, 2012
- Galway U21 B Football Championship: 2007

Hurling:

- Galway Junior C1 Hurling Championship: 2012
- Galway Junior B Hurling Championship: 2023
- Galway Junior 1 Hurling Championship: 2023, 2024, 2025
