= Monaghan Senior Hurling Championship =

- Current season or competition: 2026 Monaghan Senior Hurling Championship
- Irish: Craobh Iomána Sinsearach Mhuineacháin
- Code: Hurling
- Founded: 1909
- Trophy: Mick Quigley Cup
- Title holders: Castleblayney Hurling Club
- Most titles: Castleblayney Hurling Club (36 titles)
- Sponsors: AM Hurleys

The Monaghan Senior Hurling Championship is an annual hurling competition contested by top-tier Monaghan GAA clubs. The Monaghan County Board of the Gaelic Athletic Association has organised it since 1909.

Castleblayney Hurling Club are the title holders (2026), having defeated Truagh in the Final.

== History ==
The trophy presented to the winners was the Blayney Shoe Company Cup (1945-1996) and now the Mick Quigley Cup (since 1997). The winners of the Monaghan Championship qualify to represent their county in the Ulster Intermediate Club Hurling Championship or Ulster Junior Club Hurling Championship. The winners can, in turn, go on to play in the All-Ireland Intermediate Club Hurling Championship or All-Ireland Junior Club Hurling Championship.

The Mick Hannon DHL (Development Hurling League) is the Monaghan reserve hurling league. It was renamed in 2020, with Inniskeen being the first team to win the Mick Hannon Cup in 2021, defeating Carrickmacross in the final on a scoreline of 3-07 to 1-07.

== Format ==
The format was changed in 2025 to a straight knock-out structure.

With currently 7 teams competing the highest place in the Monaghan Senior Hurling League (SHL) qualifies for the semi-finals. The remaining 6 teams compete 3 quarter-finals.

The 3 winner and the SHL champion compete the semi-finals. The winners advance to the final.

The 3 quarter-final losers contest the Junior championship with the highest placed team in the SHL advancing directly to the final.

== Teams ==
=== 2026 Teams ===
The 7 teams competing in the 2026 Monaghan Senior Hurling Championship were:

Team	Location	Colours	Position in 2026	Championship titles	Last championship title
Carrickmacross Hurling	Carrickmacross	Green and yellow	Junior Semi-finals	9	1975
Castleblayney Hurling Club	Castleblayney	Green and gold	Champions	36	2026
Clontibret O'Neills	Clontibret	Saffron and white	Junior Runners-up	17	2003
Inniskeen Grattans	Inniskeen	Green, Red and White	Semi-finals	4	2023
Latton O'Rahilly	Latton	White and blue	Junior Champions	0	—
Monaghan Harps Hurling Club	Monaghan	Green and white	Semi-finals	6	1998
Truagh	Emyvale	Red and black	Runners-up	0	—

== Qualification for subsequent competitions ==
=== Intermediate ===
At the end of the championship, the winning team qualify to the subsequent Ulster Intermediate Club Hurling Championship, the winner of which progresses to the All-Ireland Intermediate Club Hurling Championship.

=== Junior ===
At the end of the championship, the Runners-up play the Junior champions and the winner will qualify to the subsequent Ulster Junior Club Hurling Championship, the winner of which progresses to the All-Ireland Junior Club Hurling Championship.

== List of finals ==
=== Legend ===
(r) = replay

=== List of Monaghan SHC finals ===
Year	Winners		Runners-up	
Year	Club	Score	Club	Score
1909	Greenan's Cross Tír na nÓg	5-06	Monaghan Harps	3-07
1910	Monaghan Harps	7-00	Greenan's Cross Tir na nOg	3-00
1911	Clones	5-01	Greenan's Cross Tir na nOg	0-00
1912	Unfinished			
1913	No Championship			
1914	Carrickmacross	3-02	Clones and Monaghan	0-00
1915	South Monaghan (Carrickmacross)	3-03	North Monaghan (Clones and Monaghan)	0-03
1916	South Monaghan (Carrickmacross)	3-02	North Monaghan (Clones and Monaghan)	2-01
1917	No Championship			
1918	No Championship			
1919	No Championship			
1920	No Championship			
1921	No Championship			
1922	No Championship			
1923	No Championship			
1924	No Championship			
1925	No Championship			
1926	No Championship			
1927	No Championship			
1928	No Championship			
1929	No Championship			
1930	No Championship			
1931	No Championship			
1932	No Championship			
1933	No Championship			
1934	No Championship			
1935	No Championship			
1936	No Championship			
1937	No Championship			
1938	Clones	7-04	Monaghan	4-04
1939	Unfinished			
1940	No Championship			
1941	No Championship			
1942	No Championship			
1943	Castleblayney Hurling Club	6-03	Carrickmacross	3-01
1944	Unfinished			
1945	Carrickmacross	3-01 (r)	Castleblayney Hurling Club	1-04 (r)
1946	Unfinished			
1947	No Championship			
1948	No Championship			
1949	No Championship			
1950	Clones	2-03	Monaghan	1-01
1951	Clones	4-03	Monaghan	3-01
1952	No Championship			
1953	No Championship			
1954	No Championship			
1955	Castleblayney Hurling Club	3-07	Monaghan	2-08
1956	Monaghan	4-05	Castleblayney Hurling Club	3-03
1957	Castleblayney Hurling Club	5-06	Monaghan	2-04
1958	Castleblayney Hurling Club	1-02	Keady	1-01
1959	Castleblayney Hurling Club	5-01	Dungannon Thomas Clarkes	0-00
1960	Unfinished			
1961	No Championship			
1962	Castleblayney Eire Og	4-00	Castleblayney Faughs	2-03
1963	Carrickmacross	3-04	Castleblayney Hurling Club	1-00
1964	Carrickmacross	4-03	Castleblayney Hurling Club	3-04
1965	Unfinished			
1966	Clontibret O'Neills	2-04	Castleblayney Hurling Club	1-01
1967	Carrickmacross	6-03	Castleblayney Hurling Club	1-06
1968	Clones	5-07	Clontibret O'Neills	1-02
1969	Clontibret O'Neills	5-03	Carrickmacross	4-05
1970	Clontibret O'Neills	4-07	Clones	3-05
1971	Carrickmacross	5-06	Clontibret O'Neills	3-04
1972	No Championship			
1973	Clontibret O'Neills	3-13	Carrickmacross	6-03
1974	Castleblayney Hurling Club	5-11 (r) (1-02)	Emyvale	2-02 (r) (1-02)
1975	Carrickmacross	7-06	Emyvale	3-03
1976	Ballybay Pearse Brothers	1-06	Castleblayney Hurling Club	0-08
1977	Castleblayney Hurling Club	6-07	Carrickmacross	0-06
1978	Clontibret O'Neills	3-08	Carrickmacross	1-05
1979	Castleblayney Hurling Club	1-07	Clontibret O'Neills	1-06
1980	Clontibret O'Neills	2-07	Monaghan Harps	0-05
1981	Clontibret O'Neills	4-15	Castleblayney Hurling Club	1-09
1982	Clontibret O'Neills	3-12	Carrickmacross	2-07
1983	Clontibret O'Neills	4-11	Castleblayney Hurling Club	2-07
1984	Clontibret O'Neills	4-03	Castleblayney Hurling Club	1-02
1985	Clontibret O'Neills	2-11	Monaghan Harps	0-06
1986	Clontibret O'Neills	3-07	Monaghan Harps	0-05
1987	Clontibret O'Neills	3-07	Monaghan Harps	0-05
1988	Castleblayney Hurling Club	3-07 (r) (0-14)	Clontibret O'Neills	2-03 (r) (2-08)
1989	Castleblayney Hurling Club	1-06 (r) (1-06)	Clontibret O'Neills	0-04 (r) (1-06)
1990	Clontibret O'Neills	2-10	Castleblayney Hurling Club	1-09
1991	Clontibret O'Neills	3-10	Castleblayney Hurling Club	2-09
1992	Castleblayney Hurling Club	4-08	Clontibret O'Neills	2-09
1993	Monaghan Harps	4-09	Carrickmacross	5-04
1994	Castleblayney Hurling Club	4-08	Monaghan	2-05
1995	Monaghan Harps	2-13	Carrickmacross	1-13
1996	Monaghan Harps	1-06	Castleblayney Hurling Club	0-08
1997	Clontibret O'Neills	1-12	Castleblayney Hurling Club	0-04
1998	Monaghan Harps	4-06	Clontibret O'Neills	0-08
1999	Castleblayney Hurling Club	0-10 (r)	Monaghan	0-06 (r)
2000	Castleblayney Hurling Club	2-11	Clontibret O'Neills	1-11
2001	Castleblayney Hurling Club	2-11	Clontibret O'Neills	1-10
2002	Castleblayney Hurling Club	2-10	Monaghan Harps	0-09
2003	Clontibret O'Neills	4-04 (r)	Castleblayney Hurling Club	1-07 (r)
2004	Castleblayney Hurling Club	3-14	Monaghan Harps	1-07
2005	Castleblayney Hurling Club	3-15	Carrickmacross	2-05
2006	Castleblayney Hurling Club	2-09	Inniskeen Grattans	1-10
2007	Castleblayney Hurling Club	0-15	Latton	1-10
2008	Castleblayney Hurling Club	0-17	Clontibret O'Neills	0-10
2009	Castleblayney Hurling Club	3-17	Latton	1-05
2010	Inniskeen Grattans	0-17	Castleblayney Hurling Club	2-10
2011	Castleblayney Hurling Club	2-16	Inniskeen Grattans	1-07
2012	Castleblayney Hurling Club	1-13	Inniskeen Grattans	1-11
2013	Inniskeen Grattans	0-13	Castleblayney Hurling Club	1-09
2014	Castleblayney Hurling Club	1-13	Inniskeen Grattans	0-09
2015	Castleblayney Hurling Club	2-13	Inniskeen Grattans	0-09
2016	Inniskeen Grattans	5-15	Monaghan Harps	1-06
2017	Castleblayney Hurling Club	1-17	Inniskeen Grattans	0-15
2018	Castleblayney Hurling Club	6-17	Inniskeen Grattans	0-09
2019	Castleblayney Hurling Club	1-20	Truagh	1-10
2020	Castleblayney Hurling Club	2-22	Truagh	0-08
2021	Castleblayney Hurling Club	2-23	Carrickmacross	1-10
2022	Castleblayney Hurling Club	2-15	Carrickmacross	1-08
2023	Inniskeen Grattans	1-11	Castleblayney Hurling Club	0-13
2024	Castleblayney Hurling Club	2-20	Inniskeen Grattans	0-11
2025	Castleblayney Hurling Club	1-19	Truagh	2-08
2026	Castleblayney Hurling Club	2-17	Truagh	1-13

== Roll of honour ==
=== By club ===
#	Club	Titles	Runners-up	Championships won	Championships runner-up
1	Castleblayney Hurling Club	36	18	1943, 1955, 1957, 1958, 1959, 1962, 1974, 1977, 1979, 1988, 1989, 1992, 1994, 1999, 2000, 2001, 2002, 2004, 2005, 2006, 2007, 2008, 2009, 2011, 2012, 2014, 2015, 2017, 2018, 2019, 2020, 2021, 2022, 2024, 2025, 2026	1945, 1956, 1963, 1964, 1966, 1967, 1976, 1981, 1983, 1984, 1990, 1991, 1996, 1997, 2003, 2010, 2013, 2023
2	Clontibret O'Neills	17	10	1966, 1969, 1970, 1973, 1978, 1980, 1981, 1982, 1983, 1984, 1985, 1986, 1987, 1990, 1991, 1997, 2003	1968, 1971, 1979, 1988, 1989, 1992, 1998, 2000, 2001, 2008
3	Carrickmacross	9	11	1914, 1915, 1916, 1945, 1963, 1964, 1967, 1971, 1975	1943, 1969, 1973, 1977, 1978, 1982, 1993, 1995, 2005, 2021, 2022
4	Monaghan Harps	6	8	1910, 1956, 1993, 1995, 1996, 1998	1909, 1980, 1985, 1986, 1987, 2002, 2004, 2016
5	Clones	5	1	1911, 1938, 1950, 1951, 1968	1970
6	Inniskeen Grattans	4	8	2010, 2013, 2016, 2023	2006, 2011, 2012, 2014, 2015, 2017, 2018, 2024
7	Greenan's Cross Tír na nÓg	1	2	1909	1910, 1911
7	Ballybay Pearse Brothers	1	0	1976	—
9	Monaghan	0	7	—	1938, 1950, 1951, 1955, 1957, 1994, 1999
9	Truagh	0	4	—	2019, 2020, 2025, 2026
9	North Monaghan (Clones and Monaghan)	0	2	—	1915, 1916
9	Emyvale	0	2	—	1974, 1975
9	Latton	0	2	—	2007, 2009
9	Clones and Monaghan	0	1	—	1914
9	Keady	0	1	—	1958
9	Dungannon Thomas Clarkes	0	1	—	1959
9	Castleblayney Faughs	0	1	—	1962

== Monaghan Junior Hurling Championship ==
Monaghan Junior Hurling Championship
- Code: Hurling
- Region: Monaghan (GAA)
- No. of teams: 4

The Monaghan Junior Hurling Championship (Abbreviated to the Monaghan JHC) is an annual hurling competition organised by the Monaghan County Board of the Gaelic Athletic Association and contested by the junior clubs in the county of Monaghan in Ireland. It is the second tier in the Monaghan hurling championship system.

Truagh are the title holders, defeating Monaghan Harps Hurling Club by 1-19 - 2-10 in the 2023 final.

=== Format ===
Format: Teams that finished 4th to 7th place in the group stage of the Monaghan Senior Hurling Championship contest the championship.

=== Qualification for subsequent competitions ===
At the end of the championship, the winning team qualify to the subsequent Ulster Junior Club Hurling Championship, the winner of which progresses to the All-Ireland Junior Club Hurling Championship.

=== List of finals (2023–) ===
Year	Winners		Runners-up	
Year	Club	Score	Club	Score
2023	Truagh	1-19	Monaghan Harps Hurling Club	2-10
2024	Truagh	3-13	Clontibret O'Neills	2-10
2025	Monaghan Harps	5-14	Latton	0-14
2026	Latton	1-18	Clontibret O'Neills	2-14

=== Roll of honour (2023–) ===
Winner	Titles	Runners-up	Years won	Years runners-up
Truagh	2	0	2023, 2024	—
Monaghan Harps Hurling Club	1	1	2025	2023
Latton	1	1	2026	2025
Clontibret O'Neills	0	2	—	2024, 2026

== See also ==
- Monaghan Senior Football Championship
