= Burren Rangers =

Hurling club in County Carlow

- Raonaithe na Buirne
- Founded: 2015
- County: Carlow
- Colours: White and Green
- Grounds: Kilbride GAA Field
- Coordinates: 52°43′N 6°43′W

Playing kits
Standard colours

Burren Rangers Hurling and Camogie Club is a hurling and camogie club based in eastern County Carlow, Ireland.

== History ==
The club was founded in 2015 and is named for the Burren River. It serves the villages of Ballon, Rathtoe, Fighting Cocks and Kilbride. They won their first Carlow JHC in 2024.

== Honours ==
=== Hurling ===
- Carlow Junior Hurling Championship (1): 2024
