= Murders of Eoghan and Ruairi Chada =

2013 murders in Ireland

On 28 July 2013, 10-year-old Eoghan Chada and 5-year-old Ruairi Chada were abducted from their home in County Carlow in Ireland by their father, Sanjeev Chada. Both children were found deceased the following day on the opposite side of the country in County Mayo.

== Background ==
Eoghan and Ruairi Chada were the children of Kathleen (née Murphy) and Sanjeev Chada and resided in Ballinkillin, Bagenalstown, County Carlow. Both children attended Ballinkillen National School.

Kathleen Chada was a nurse working within the IVF industry. Sanjeev Chada was an IT consultant and volunteer with Ballinkillen Community Centre. At the time of the murders, a Garda investigation was underway into over €50,000 that had gone missing from the community centre. Chada had been under investigation in relation to the missing money, but hadn't been questioned.

10 days prior to the murder, Kathleen learned that Sanjeev had taken €56,000 from the community centre to after he ran up debts gambling on the stock market. She believed they would be able to repay the debts and had no intentions of leaving Sanjeev.

== Disappearance ==
On the evening of Sunday 28 July 2013, Sanjeev Chada informed Kathleen Chada that he was taking the boys bowling in Carlow Town. When they failed to return home, they were reported missing at 1:30am on the morning of Monday 29 July 2013. Kathleen belived Sanjeev had fled due to his debts. Following the disappearances, Gardaí issued their first ever Child Rescue Ireland Alert following its launch in May 2012.

== Murder and discovery ==
At approximately 5:00am on Monday 29 July 2013, Sanjeev Chada used a rope to strangle both boys. Eoghan Chada was found to have also suffered broken ribs, a broken hip bone, and a broken collarbone.

At approximately 3:15pm on Monday 29 July 2013, a passersby came upon Sanjeev Chada's car crashed into a wall in Rossbeg, outside Westport, County Mayo. Chada had a rope in his hand and appeared to be attempting to choke himself. A passerby who was on holiday in the area opened the boot of the car and discovered the bodies of Eoghan and Ruairi Chada there. After Gardaí arrived, a passing doctor stopped and examined Sanjeev Chada and checked that the boys were deceased. They were pronounced dead at 3:45pm

Sanjeev Chada was taken to hospital with minor injuries following the crash and discovery of the bodies.

Prior to being taken to hospital, a passerby who had come to his aid gave Sanjeev Chada a loan of a mobile phone which he used to call Kathleen and informed her of the death of their children, saying, "They’re dead in the back."

== Investigation and sentencing ==
Following Sanjeev Chada's release from hospital, he was charged with the murder of his sons. A month before his trial was due to begin, he pled guilty to both murders and received two mandatory life sentences.

In interviews, Sanjeev Chada disclosed that at one point, he had been €500,000 in debt from his gambling. Sanjeev believed his marriage to Kathleen was over now that his fraud was exposed and wanted to spare his children from coming from a broken home. In his statements to Gardaí, Sanjeev Chada admitted that he had also planned to kill his wife, Kathleen, but didn't believe he would be able to as she was too strong.

Sanjeev Chada applied for parole in 2026, 12 years into his sentence.

== Aftermath ==
Following the murder of her sons, Kathleen Chada became a founding member of the charity Sentencing And Victim Equality (SAVE), which calls for a number of sentencing reforms, including requiring the full minimum sentences be completed before becoming eligible for parole and ending the use of concurrent sentencing.

In 2013, Kathleen Chada published a memoir, Everything, about the murders.

In July 2026 The Irish Sun published a podcast, Forever My Boys, about the murders.
