= 1991 Galway Senior Hurling Championship =

Annual hurling competition season

- Champions: Kiltormer (5th title); Aidan Staunton (captain); John Goode (manager)
- Runners-up: Athenry; Gerry Keane (captain); Conrad Burns (manager)

The 1991 Galway Senior Hurling Championship was the 94th completed staging of the Galway Senior Hurling Championship since its establishment by the Galway County Board in 1887.

Kiltormer entered the championship as the defending champions.

The final was played on 27 October 1991 at St Brendan's Park in Loughrea, between Kiltormer and Athenry, in what was their second meeting in the final. Kiltormer won the match by 3–09 to 0–15 to claim their fifth championship title overall and a second consecutive title.

== Results ==
=== Quarter-finals ===
15 September 1991 Quarter-final	Castlegar	0-09 - 1-12	Turloughmore	Pearse Stadium

15 September 1991 Quarter-final	Sarsfields	2-14 - 1-03	Kinvara	Kenny Park

22 September 1991 Quarter-final	Kiltormer	2-14 - 1-11	Killimordaly	Duggan Park

22 September 1991 Quarter-final	Athenry	3-10 - 1-09	Meelick–Eyrecourt	Duggan Park

=== Semi-final ===
29 September 1991 Semi-final	Athenry	2-12 - 0-14	Sarsfields	St Brendan's Park

29 September 1991 Semi-final	Kiltormer	0-18 - 0-18	Turloughmore	St Brendan's Park

6 October 1991 Semi-final replay	Kiltormer	2-13 - 2-11	Turloughmore	St Brendan's Park

=== Final ===
27 October 1991 Final	Kiltormer	3-09 - 0-15	Turloughmore	St Brendan's Park
