= 1990 Galway Senior Hurling Championship =

Annual hurling competition season

- Champions: Kiltormer (4th title); Aidan Staunton (captain)
- Runners-up: Turloughmore; Gerry Burke (captain)

The 1990 Galway Senior Hurling Championship was the 93rd completed staging of the Galway Senior Hurling Championship since its establishment by the Galway County Board in 1887.

Sarsfields entered the championship as the defending champions.

The final was played on 4 November 1990 at Kenny Park in Athenry, between Kiltormer and Turloughmore, in what was their first ever meeting in the final. Kiltormer won the match by 0–18 to 2–07 to claim their fourth championship title overall and a first title in eight years.

== Results ==
=== Semi-finals ===
| 7 October 1990 Semi-final | Kiltormer | 0-14 - 0-12 | Sarsfields | Kenny Park |

| 21 October 1990 Semi-final | Turloughmore | 2-06 - 1-06 | Meelick–Eyrecourt | Duggan Park |

=== Final ===
| 4 November 1990 Final | Kiltormer | 0-18 - 2-07 | Turloughmore | Kenny Park |
