= Andy Fenton =

Irish sportsperson (1952–2026)

Personal information
- Native name: Aindriú Ó Fiannachta (Irish)
- Born: 26 November 1952 Kiltormer, County Galway, Ireland
- Died: 30 September 2026 (aged 73) Kiltormer, County Galway, Ireland
- Occupation: Company director
- Height: 5 ft 11 in (180 cm)

Sport
- Sport: Hurling
- Position: Left corner-back
Club
- Years: Club
- Kiltormer
Club titles
- Galway titles: 3
- Connacht titles: 1
- All-Ireland Titles: 0
College
- Years: College
- St Patrick's College
College titles
- Fitzgibbon titles: 2
Inter-county
Years	County	Apps (scores)
1971-1979	Galway	11 (1-02)
Inter-county titles
- All-Irelands: 0
- NHL: 0
- All Stars: 0

Andrew Fenton (26 November 1952 – 30 September 2026) was an Irish hurler. At club level he played with Kiltormer and at inter-county level with the Galway senior hurling team.

== Career ==
Born and raised in Clontuskert, County Galway, Fenton was educated at Garbally College in Ballinasloe where he played rugby union. He won a Connacht Senior Cup medal in 1971. Fenton later studied at St Patrick's College in Maynooth and won consecutive Fitzgibbon Cup medals during his time there.

At club level, Fenton first played hurling at juvenile and underage levels with the Clontuskert team. He was one of a number of key people involved in the amalgamation of several clubs and the creation of the Kiltormer club in 1969. Fenton won a Galway IHC with the new club in 1975, before captaining Kiltormer to consecutive Galway SHC titles in 1976 and 1977.

Fenton also played Gaelic football with Kiltormer and won a Galway JFC title in 1979. This was followed by a Galway IFC title in 1980. Fenton won a third Galway SHC medal in 1982, however, he missed the final. This was followed by a Connacht Club SHC medal, following a 3–14 to 0–06 win over Four Roads in the final.

At inter-county level, Fenton first played for Galway as part of the minor team beaten by Cork in the 1970 All-Ireland MHC final. Two years later, he was part of the under-21 team that won Galway's first All-Ireland U21HC title after a 2–09 to 1–10 win over Dublin. By that stage, Fenton had already made his senior team debut. He lined out at corner-back for Galway's 2–12 to 1–08 defeat by Kilkenny in the 1979 All-Ireland SHC final.

== Death ==
Fenton died on 30 September 2026, at the age of 73.

== Honours ==
Garbally College

- Connacht Schools Rugby Senior Cup (1): 1971

St Patrick's College, Maynooth

- Fitzgibbon Cup (2): 1973, 1974

Kiltormer

- Connacht Senior Club Hurling Championship (1): 1982
- Galway Senior Hurling Championship (3): 1976 (c), 1977 (c), 1982
- Galway Intermediate Hurling Championship (1): 1975
- Galway Intermediate Football Championship (1): 1980
- Galway Junior Football Championship (1): 1979

Galway

- All-Ireland Under-21 Hurling Championship (1): 1972
