= 1995 Galway Senior Hurling Championship =

Annual hurling competition season

- Champions: Sarsfields (5th title); Michael Kenny (captain); Michael Conneely (manager)
- Runners-up: Portumna; David Canning (captain); Michael Monaghan (manager)

Tournament statistics
- Top scorer(s): Frank Canning (2–46)

The 1995 Galway Senior Hurling Championship was the 98th completed staging of the Galway Senior Hurling Championship since its establishment by the Galway County Board in 1887.

Athenry entered the championship as the defending champions.

The final was played on 22 October 1995 at St Brendan's Park in Loughrea, between Sarsfields and Portumna, in what was their first ever meeting in the final. Sarsfields won the match by 0–17 to 1–09 to claim their fifth championship title overall and a first title in two years.

== Results ==
=== Quarter-finals ===
9 September 1995 Quarter-final	Portumna	0-13 - 0-11	Castlegar	Kenny Park

9 September 1995 Quarter-final	Abbey/Duniry	0-13 - 2-05	Carnmore	Kenny Park

17 September 1995 Quarter-final	Sarsfields	1-15 - 0-12	Athenry	Duggan Park

17 September 1995 Quarter-final	Gort	3-10 - 2-13	Kiltormer	Duggan Park

24 September 1995 Quarter-final replay	Gort	0-13 - 0-04	Kiltormer	St Brendan's Park

=== Semi-finals ===
24 September 1995 Semi-final	Portumna	2-16 - 2-09	Abbey/Duniry	St Brendan's Park

8 October 1995 Semi-final	Sarsfields	2-12 - 1-10	Gort	Kenny Park

=== Final ===
22 October 1995 Final	Sarsfields	0-17 - 1-09	Portumna	St Brendan's Park
