= 2026 Galway Senior Hurling Championship =

Annual hurling competition season

Tournament details
- County: Galway
- Year: 2026
- Sponsor: Forvis Mazars

Winners
- Champions: Loughrea GAA (5th win)

Runners-up
- Runners-up: Tommy Larkin's GAA

Promotion/Relegation
- Relegated team(s): Moycullen

The 2026 Galway Senior Hurling Championship is the 129th staging of the Galway Senior Hurling Championship since its establishment in 1887. The competition is sponsored by Forvis Mazars. Loughrea are the defending champions. The competition ran from 9 August until 1st November.

Loughrea defended their title after beating Tommy Larkin's 0-17 to 0-16 in the final for their 5th Senior title and their third in a row.

Tommy Larkin's reached the final for the first time since their only appearance in 1971.

== Competition format ==
16 teams compete for the championship title. The bottom team after a relegation play-off will be relegated to Intermediate. Compared to 2025 the Senior B competition ceases to exist and its teams are integrated in the Intermediate championship.

The Galway champion qualifies directly for the All-Ireland Senior Club Championship due to the lack of opposition from other counties in Connacht.

== Group stage ==
Senior consists of 16 teams divided into four groups of four. The format is:

- Top team in each group → Quarterfinals
- 2nd and 3rd place → Preliminary Quarterfinals
- 4th place in each group → Relegation playoffs

The draw of the group took place on 22 June.

=== Group 1 ===
Pos	Team	Pld	W	D	L	SF	SA	Diff	Pts
1	Tommy Larkin's	3	2	1	0	75	62	13	5
2	Loughrea	3	2	0	1	75	72	3	4
3	Gort	3	1	0	2	79	89	-10	2
4	Moycullen	3	0	1	2	61	67	-6	1

9 August; Round 1	Moycullen	2-18 - 1-24	Gort

9 August; Round 1	Tommy Larkin's	3-16 - 1-17	Loughrea

23 August; Round 2	Gort	1-19 - 1-27	Tommy Larkin's

23 August; Round 2	Loughrea	1-17 - 1-14	Moycullen

5 September; Round 3	Loughrea	3-26 - 3-21	Gort

5 September; Round 3	Moycullen	0-20 - 1-17	Tommy Larkin's

=== Group 2 ===
Pos	Team	Pld	W	D	L	SF	SA	Diff	Pts
1	Clarinbridge	3	3	0	0	78	55	23	6
2	Craughwell	3	2	0	1	77	67	10	4
3	Liam Mellows	3	1	0	2	62	70	-8	2
4	Cappataggle	3	0	0	3	57	82	-25	0

9 August; Round 1	Cappataggle	2-13 - 2-20	Liam Mellows

9 August; Round 1	Craughwell	2-17 - 1-22	Clarinbridge

23 August; Round 2	Clarinbridge	2-18 - 0-17	Cappataggle

23 August; Round 2	Liam Mellows	1-18 - 0-23	Craughwell

5 September; Round 3	Craughwell	2-25 - 2-15	Cappataggle

5 September; Round 3	Liam Mellows	0-15 - 2-22	Clarinbridge

=== Group 3 ===
Pos	Team	Pld	W	D	L	SF	SA	Diff	Pts
1	Sarsfields	3	2	1	0	76	68	8	5
2	St Thomas'	3	2	0	1	76	71	5	4
3	Castlegar	3	1	1	1	82	84	-2	3
4	Oranmore–Maree	3	0	0	3	64	75	-11	0

9 August; Round 1	Sarsfields	2-21 - 1-24	Castlegar

9 August; Round 1	St Thomas'	0-23 - 0-19	Oranmore–Maree

23 August; Round 2	Castlegar	1-25 - 6-14	St Thomas'

23 August; Round 2	Oranmore–Maree	1-18 - 2-19	Sarsfields

6 September; Round 3	Oranmore–Maree	3-15 - 2-21	Castlegar

6 September; Round 3	Sarsfields	3-15 - 1-17	St Thomas'

=== Group 4 ===
Pos	Team	Pld	W	D	L	SF	SA	Diff	Pts
1	Athenry	3	3	0	0	86	59	27	6
2	Turloughmore	3	2	0	1	85	70	15	4
3	Ardrahan	3	1	0	2	59	68	-9	2
4	Killimordaly	3	0	0	3	65	98	-33	0

9 August; Round 1	Ardrahan	1-22 - 1-21	Killimordaly

9 August; Round 1	Turloughmore	2-20 - 2-22	Athenry

23 August; Round 2	Athenry	1-21 - 1-18	Ardrahan

23 August; Round 2	Killimordaly	3-20 - 0-39	Turloughmore

5 September; Round 3	Killimordaly	0-12 - 4-22	Athenry

6 September; Round 3	Turloughmore	0-20 - 0-13	Ardrahan

== Relegation ==
=== Semi-finals ===
20 September; Relegation Semi-final	Cappataggle	2-17 - 4-19	Oranmore–Maree

20 September; Relegation Semi-final	Killimordaly	0-28 - 0-23	Moycullen

=== Final ===
3 October; Relegation Final	Moycullen	1-16 - 0-19	Cappataggle

18 October; Relegation Final Replay	Cappataggle	4-23 - 0-17	Moycullen

== Preliminary Quarter-finals ==
19 September; Preliminary Quarterfinal	Loughrea	2-21 - 2-17	Castlegar

19 September; Preliminary Quarterfinal	St Thomas'	2-15 - 0-22	Gort

20 September; Preliminary Quarterfinal	Craughwell	1-23 - 0-25	Ardrahan

20 September; Preliminary Quarterfinal	Turloughmore	0-22 - 2-9	Liam Mellows

== Quarter-finals ==
3 October; Quarterfinal	Tommy Larkin's	4-14 - 1-21	Turloughmore
3 October; Quarterfinal		Report

3 October; Quarterfinal	Clarinbridge	4-25 - 0-18	Gort

3 October; Quarterfinal	Athenry	0-14 - 2-19	Loughrea
3 October; Quarterfinal		Report

4 October; Quarterfinal	Sarsfields	1-17 - 1-24	Craughwell

== Semi-finals ==
17 October; Semifinal	Clarinbridge	1-27 - 2-26	Tommy Larkin's

18 October; Semifinal	Loughrea	0-20 - 0-15	Craughwell

== Final ==
1 November; 15:00; Final	Tommy Larkin's	0-16 - 0-17	Loughrea	Pearse Stadium; Referee: Conor Quinlan
1 November; 15:00; Final	Jamie Ryan 0-8 (4fs, 1 65, 1 sideline), Tiernan Killeen 0-5, Caimin Killeen, Vince Morgan, Anthony Burns, and Cullen Killeen 0-1 each.	Report	Jason Flynn 0-8 (4fs, 1 65), Kevin McHugo 0-2, Cian Daniels, Ronan Murphy, Conor Gardiner, Adrian Moran, Conor Slattery, and Eanna Murphy (f) 0-1 each.	Pearse Stadium; Referee: Conor Quinlan

== Weblinks ==
https://www.galwaygaa.ie/competitions/
