= Mick Kenny (Galway hurler) =

Irish hurler

Personal information
- Native name: Mícheál Ó Cionnaith (Irish)
- Born: 1893 Duniry, County Galway, Ireland
- Died: 25 June 1959 (aged 65–66) Portumna, County Galway, Ireland
- Occupation: Farmer
- Height: 6 ft 2 in (188 cm)

Sport
- Sport: Hurling
- Position: Midfield
Club
- Years: Club
- Tynagh
Club titles
- Galway titles: 5
Inter-county
- Years: County
- 1921-1924: Galway
Inter-county titles
- All-Irelands: 1

Michael Kenny (1893 – 25 June 1959) was an Irish hurler who played as a midfielder for the Galway senior team from 1922 until 1924.

Kenny made his first appearance for the team during the 1921 championship and was a regular member of the starting fifteen for the next three seasons. During that time he won one All-Ireland medal. An All-Ireland runner-up on one occasion, Kenny captained Galway to their first All-Ireland title in 1923.

At club level Kenny was a five-time county club championship medalist with Tynagh.

== Playing career ==
=== Club ===
Kenny played his club hurling with Tynagh and enjoyed much success during a lengthy career.

After losing back-to-back championship deciders in 1918 and 1919, Tynagh qualified for a third successive county final in 1920. A defeat of Kilconieron gave Kenny his first championship medal.

After the suspension of the championship the following year, Tynagh reached the county decider once again in 1922. Galway City were defeated on that occasion with Kenny winning a second championship medal. Tynagh made it two-in-a-row in 1923 with Kenny adding a third medal to his collection following a defeat of Ardrahan.

Once again the championship was suspended in 1924, however, Tynagh continued their dominance on its resumption by reaching the county final again in 1925. Craughwell were defeated on this occasion as Kenny won his fourth championship medal.

After two years of no championship activity, Tynagh defeated Peterswell in the championship decider of 1928. It was Kenny's fifth and final championship medal.

=== Inter-county ===
Kenny first came to prominence on the inter-county scene as a member of the Galway senior team as captain in 1921. He enjoyed little success in his first two years on the team, however, Galway gave a good account of themselves in a narrow defeat by Tipperary in the 1922 All-Ireland semi-final.

In 1923 Kenny was captain as Galway qualified for their first All-Ireland final in thirty-six years. After beating reigning champions Kilkenny at the penultimate stage, Galway now faced Limerick who were bidding for a third All-Ireland title in seven years. A high-scoring game developed, however, at half-time the sides were level. A hat-trick of goals by Leonard McGrath and powerful displays by Mick Gill and Mick Derivan helped Galway to a 7-3 to 4-5 victory. It was a first All-Ireland medal for Kenny, while he also had the honour of being the first Galwayman to lift the Liam MacCarthy Cup.

Kenny was Galway captain again in 1924. That year he guided the team to a second successive All-Ireland decider with Dublin providing the opposition. Galway played with the wind in the first-half and led by three points at the break. Two goals by Dublin forward Garrett Howard and a great goalkeeping display by Tommy Daly ensured a 5-3 to 2-6 defeat for Galway. Kenny retired from inter-county hurling following this defeat.

== Personal life ==
Born in Duniry, County Galway, Kenny was one of a family of ten consisting of six boys and four girls. He was educated locally and later worked at Larkin's Shop in Lisheen. He later moved to Tynagh to work in the business of fellow inter-county hurler Ignatius Harney. Kenny later received a Land Commission farm in Portumna.

Kenny married a Westmeath native, however, she died young leaving him with three daughters. He remarried and had two more daughters during his second marriage.

Mick Kenny died on 25 June 1959.

Sporting positions
Preceded by	Galway Senior Hurling Captain; 1922-1924	Succeeded by Andy Kelly
Achievements
Preceded by Wattie Dunphy (Kilkenny)	All-Ireland Senior Hurling Final winning captain 1923	Succeeded by Frank Wall (Dublin)
