= 1978 Galway Senior Hurling Championship =

Annual hurling competition season

- Champions: Ardrahan (11th title)
- Runners-up: Ballinderreen

The 1978 Galway Senior Hurling Championship was the 81st completed staging of the Galway Senior Hurling Championship since its establishment by the Galway County Board in 1887.

Kiltormer entered the championship as the defending champions.

The final, a replay, was played on 19 November 1978 at Duggan Park in Ballinasloe, between Ardrahan and Ballinderreen, in what was their first ever meeting in the final. Ardrahan won the match by 2–18 to 2–14 to claim their 11th championship title overall and a first title in three years.

== Results ==
=== Final ===
15 October 1978 Final	Ardrahan	2-10 - 0-16	Ballinderreen	Duggan Park

=== Final replay ===
19 November 1978 Final replay	Ardrahan	2-18 - 2-14 (aet)	Ballinderreen	Duggan Park
