= 2025 Galway Senior Hurling Championship =

Annual hurling competition season

Tournament details
- County: Galway
- Year: 2025
- Sponsor: Forvis Mazars

Winners
- Champions: Loughrea (4th win)
- Manager: Tommy Kelly
- Captain: Ian Hanrahan

Promotion/Relegation
- Relegated team(s): Kilconieron

The 2025 Galway Senior Hurling Championship is the 128th staging of the Galway Senior Hurling Championship since its establishment in 1887. The competition is sponsored by Forvis Mazars, marking the beginning of a new partnership. Loughrea defended their title beating St. Thomas' in the final on a scoreline of 1-15 to 1-14. This marked their 4th Galway Senior Title. St. Thomas' lost a senior final for the first time after 8 previous wins.

== Competition format ==
Twenty-four teams compete; sixteen in Senior A and eight in Senior B.

- The teams in Senior A play for the championship title.
- The teams in Senior B compete for promotion to Senior A in 2026.
- One team from Senior A will be relegated to Senior B, and one from Senior B will be relegated to Intermediate.

== Senior A ==
=== Group stage ===
Senior A consists of 16 teams divided into four groups of four. The format is:

- Top team in each group → Quarterfinals
- 2nd and 3rd place → Preliminary Quarterfinals
- 4th place in each group → Relegation playoffs

==== Senior A – Group A ====
Pos	Team	Pld	W	D	L	SF	SA	Diff	Pts
1	St Thomas'	3	3	0	0	6-79	1-51	43	6
2	Athenry	3	2	0	1	2-67	4-53	8	4
3	Moycullen	3	1	0	2	1-49	6-67	-27	2
4	Gort	3	0	0	3	2-45	2-69	-24	0

8 August 2025; 19:15; Round 1	St Thomas'	1-28 - 0-15	Gort	Kilbacanty; Referee: Brian Keon
8 August 2025; 19:15; Round 1	Conor Cooney (1-10; 1-0 penalty, 0-6 frees, 0-1 '65), Eanna Burke (0-7); David Burke (0-2); Gerald Kelly (0-1 free); Shane Cooney, Darren Farrell, Damien McGlynn, Darragh Burke, Oisin Flannery, Victor Manso, Damien Finnerty, Sean Fallon (0-1)		Aiden Helebert (0-8; 0-7 frees); Greg Lally, Lorcan Walsh (0-2); Ben O'Donovan, Paddy Commins, Richie Cummins (0-1)	Kilbacanty; Referee: Brian Keon

9 August 2025; 16:15; Round 1	Athenry	1-25 - 2-14	Moycullen	Pearse Stadium; Referee: Paul Fahy
9 August 2025; 16:15; Round 1	Cian Burke (0-10; 0-8 frees, 0-1 '65); Cillian Lawless (0-7); Conor Lawless, Patrick Hannon (0-2); Ciaran Hardiman, Jack Carr, Ronan Hardiman, Matthew Feeney (0-1)		James Bradley (0-6; 0-5 frees); Eanna Noone, Cian Folan (1-1); Niall Mannion (0-4); Eanna Davoren, Colm Cunningham (0-1)	Pearse Stadium; Referee: Paul Fahy

23 August 2025; 14:30; Round 2	Athenry	0-22 - 1-16	Gort	Loughrea; Referee: Shane Hynes
23 August 2025; 14:30; Round 2	Jason Rabbitte (0-10; 0-7 frees, 0-1 '65); Ronan Hardiman (0-3); Conor Lawless, Noel Keogh (0-2); Eoin Lawless, Ciaran Hardiman, Patrick Hannon, Cillian Lawless, Jack Carr (0-1)		Aiden Helebert (0-7; 0-3 frees, 0-1 '65); Paddy Commins (1-3; 1-0 sideline; 0-1 free); Richie Cummins (0-3); Caoimhin Marren, Darren Grealish (0-1)	Loughrea; Referee: Shane Hynes

23 August 2025; 17:15; Round 2	St Thomas'	4-28 - 0-16	Moycullen	Pearse Stadium; Referee: David Earls
23 August 2025; 17:15; Round 2	Conor Cooney (0-13; 0-8 frees); Victor Manso (2-1); Eanna Burke (0-6); Evan Brady (2-0); Darragh Burke, James Regan (0-2); Darren Farrell, Evan Duggan, David Burke, Damien McGlynn (0-1)		James Bradley (0-7 frees); Eanna Noone (0-3); Niall Fitzgerald (0-2); Eanna Davoren, Paul Kearns, Aaron Barrett (0-1); Niall Mannion (0-1 free)	Pearse Stadium; Referee: David Earls

7 September 2025; 13:15; Round 3	Moycullen	1-19 - 1-14	Gort	Pearse Stadium; Referee: Conor Quinlan
7 September 2025; 13:15; Round 3	James Bradley (0-7; 0-6 frees, 0-1 '65); Eanna Noone (1-3; 1-0 penalty, 0-1 sideline); C olmCunningham, Cian Folan, Paul Kearns (0-2); Diarmuid Davoren, Mark Bradley (1-0)		Aiden Helebert (0-5; 0-2 frees); Paddy Commins (1-2); Caoimhin Marren, Lorcan Walsh (0-2); Nathan Gill, Jack Linnane, Darren Grealish (0-1)	Pearse Stadium; Referee: Conor Quinlan

7 September 2025; 16:15; Round 3	St Thomas'	1-23 - 1-20	Athenry	Kenny Park, Athenry; Referee: Kerril Wade
7 September 2025; 16:15; Round 3	Conor Cooney (0-9; 0-8 frees); Victor Manso (1-3); Eanna Burke (0-4); Darren Farrell, David Burke, James Regan (0-2); Darragh Burke (0-1)		Jason Rabbitte (1-14; 1-0 penalty; 0-11 frees); Conor Lawless, Ronan Hardiman (0-2), Patrick Hannon, Cillian Lawless (0-1)	Kenny Park, Athenry; Referee: Kerril Wade

==== Senior A – Group B ====
Pos	Team	Pld	W	D	L	SF	SA	Diff	Pts
1	Craughwell	3	3	0	0	7-67	7-52	15	6
2	Loughrea	3	2	0	1	7-66	6-49	20	4
3	Killimordaly	3	1	0	2	6-42	8-61	-25	2
4	Kilconieron	3	0	0	3	4-47	3-60	-10	0

8 August 2025; 19:15; Round 1	Loughrea	1-19 - 0-18	Kilconieron	Duggan Park; Referee: Christopher Browne
8 August 2025; 19:15; Round 1	Tiernan Killeen (0-6; 0-5 frees); Shane Morgan (0-4; 0-3 frees, 0-1 '65); Martin McManus (1-1); Jamie Ryan, Caimin Killeen (0-2); Ian Hanrahan, Joe Mooney, Neil Keary, Vince Morgan (0-1)		Shane Caulfield (0-8; 0-6 frees, 0-1 '65); Eamonn McGlynn (0-4); S Murray (0-1 '65); Ultan McGlynn, Ian McGlynn, Keith Burke, Daniel Keane, Eoghan Mulleady (0-1)	Duggan Park; Referee: Christopher Browne

9 August 2025; 14:30; Round 1	Craughwell	3-20 - 2-17	Killimordaly	Loughrea; Referee: Derek Kelly
9 August 2025; 14:30; Round 1	Thomas Monaghan (0-7); Adrian Prendergast (0-7, 0-2 frees); Ciaran Leen (0-4; 0-3 frees); Tiarnan Leen, Jamie Ryan, Nigel Kelly (1-0); Mark Horan, Conor Gilligan (0-1)		Brian Burke (1-5; 1-2 frees); Darren Daly (0-7; 0-2 frees, 0-1 '65); Paul Creaven (1-1); David Earls, Gary McDonagh, Shane Monaghan, Luke Lynskey (0-1)	Loughrea; Referee: Derek Kelly

23 August 2025; 16:00; Round 2	Craughwell	1-24 - 3-13	Kilconieron	Kilbacanty; Referee: Noel Quinn
23 August 2025; 16:00; Round 2	Ciaran Leen (0-9; 0-6 frees, 0-1 '65); Nigel Kelly (1-1); Thomas Monaghan, Tiernan Leen (0-3); Stephen O'Halloran, Patrick Monaghan, Ryan Howley, Lucas Keane, Conor Gilligan, Jamie Ryan, Darragh McCartin (0-1); Adrian Prendergast (0-1 free)		Eoghan Mulleady (0-4; 0-1 free, 0-1 '65); Ian McGlynn, Daniel Keane (1-1); Shane Caulfield (0-3; 0-2 frees); Eamonn McGLynn (0-2); Peter Martin, Jack Walsh (0-1); Own goal scored by Craughwell	Kilbacanty; Referee: Noel Quinn

24 August 2025; 18:15; Round 2	Loughrea	4-25 - 3-8	Killimordaly	Duggan Park; Referee: Liam Gordon
24 August 2025; 18:15; Round 2	Tiernan Killeen (0-6, 0-5 frees); Anthony Burns (2-0); Caimin Killeen (1-2); Shane Morgan (0-4 frees); Jamie Ryan (0-4; 0-1 sideline); Neil Keary (0-4); Vince Morgan (1-1); Martin McManus (0-3); Cullen Killeen (0-1)		Brian Burke (2-2; 1-0 penalty, 0-1 free); Brian Concannon (1-1); Darren Daly (0-3; 0-2 frees); Aaron McDonagh (0-2)	Duggan Park; Referee: Liam Gordon

6 September 2025; 16:15; Round 3	Killimordaly	1-17 - 1-16	Kilconieron	Kenny Park, Athenry; Referee: Paul Fahy
6 September 2025; 16:15; Round 3	Brian Burke (0-8; 0-7 frees, 0-1 '65); Brian Concannon (0-4); S Monaghan (1-0); Darren Daly (0-2); Paul Creaven, Luke Lynskey, R Brett (0-1)		Shane Caulfield (0-10; 0-9 frees); Ian McGlynn (0-4; 0-1 sideline); Jack Walsh (1-0); Ultan McGlynn, Eamonn McGlynn (0-1)	Kenny Park, Athenry; Referee: Paul Fahy

7 September 2025; 18:00; Round 3	Craughwell	3-23 - 2-22	Loughrea	Kenny Park, Athenry; Referee: Shane Hynes
7 September 2025; 18:00; Round 3	Ciaran Leen (0-12; 0-8 frees; 0-1 '65); Tiernan Leen (1-5; 0-1 sideline); Thomas Monaghan (0-4); Stephen O'Halloran (1-0 penalty); Adrian Prendergast (1-0); Ryan Howley, Conor Gilligan (0-1)		Tiernan Killeen (0-6; 0-5 frees, 0-1 '65); Cullen Kileen, Martin McManus (0-4); Vince Morgan (1-1); Johnny Coen, Shane Morgan (0-1 free); Joe Mooney, Caimin Killeen, A Kelly, Anthony Burns, M Murray (0-1); P Hoban (0-1 free)	Kenny Park, Athenry; Referee: Shane Hynes

==== Senior A – Group C ====
Pos	Team	Pld	W	D	L	SF	SA	Diff	Pts
1	Clarinbridge	3	3	0	0	15-71	4-67	37	6
2	Turloughmore	3	2	0	1	8-75	9-47	25	4
3	Castlegar	3	1	0	2	4-56	6-73	-32	2
4	Ardrahan	3	0	0	3	4-53	9-68	-30	0

9 August 2025; 17:00; Round 1	Castlegar	1-20 - 0-22	Ardrahan	Kenny Park, Athenry; Referee: Shane Hynes
9 August 2025; 17:00; Round 1	Ger Farragher (0-13; 0-12 frees); Greg Thomas (1-3); Sean Neary (0-2); Jack Coyne, Simon Thomas (0-1)		Sean Gardiner (0-9 frees); Brian Callanan (0-4); Enda Gardiner (0-4; 0-2 frees; 0-1 sideline); Oisin Slevin (0-2); Cian Callanan, Eoin Murphy, Cianan Fahy (0-1)	Kenny Park, Athenry; Referee: Shane Hynes

9 August 2025; 18:45; Round 1	Clarinbridge	5-21 - 1-26	Turloughmore	Kenny Park, Athenry; Referee: Conor Quinlan
9 August 2025; 18:45; Round 1	Evan Niland (0-13; 0-7 frees, 0-1 '65); Joshua Ryan (2-1); Aaron Niand (2-0); Mark Kennedy (0-3); Mikey Fallon (1-0); David Lee (0-2); Dylan Dunne, Liam Leen (0-1)		Conor Walsh (0-16; 0-13 frees, 0-1 '65); Tom Quirke (1-2); Daithi Burke, Cillian Whelan (0-2); Daniel Loftus, Barry McDonagh, Dara Whelan, Jamie Holland (0-1)	Kenny Park, Athenry; Referee: Conor Quinlan

23 August 2025; 18:30; Round 2	Turloughmore	5-29 - 1-14	Castlegar	Kenny Park, Athenry; Referee: Sean Byrne
23 August 2025; 18:30; Round 2	Cillian Whelan (2-4); Conor Walsh (0-7; 0-3 frees); Jamie Holland (1-6; 0-2 frees); Tom Quirke (1-3); Sean Loftus (0-4); Dara Whelan (1-0); Matthew Tarpey (0-2); Cillian Trayers, Barry McDonagh, Eanna O Loingsigh (0-1)		Ger Farragher (0-6; 0-2 frees, 0-1 sideline); Darragh Neary (0-4); Greg Thomas (1-0); Gearoid King, Jack Coyne, Dylan Carrol, Michael Casey (0-1)	Kenny Park, Athenry; Referee: Sean Byrne

24 August 2025; 14:15; Round 2	Clarinbridge	6-28 - 1-19	Ardrahan	Kenny Park, Athenry; Referee: Brian Keon
24 August 2025; 14:15; Round 2	Evan Niland (1-10; 0-5 frees, 0-1 '65); Mark Kennedy (2-3); Aaron Niland (1-3); David Lee (0-4); Shane Ryan (1-1); Gavin Lee (0-3); Johsua Ryan (1-0); Dylan Dunne, Darragh Counihan, Cian Sammon (0-1); Niall Armstrong (0-1 free)		Sean Gardiner (0-11; 0-8 frees, 0-1 '65); Cianan Fahy (0-5); Iain Lynskey (1-1); Enda Gardiner (0-2 frees);	Kenny Park, Athenry; Referee: Brian Keon

7 September 2025; 15:00; Round 3	Turloughmore	2-20 - 3-12	Ardrahan	Loughrea; Referee: Brian Keon

7 September 2025; 15:00; Round 3	Clarinbridge	4-22 - 2-22	Castlegar	Pearse Stadium; Referee: Karol Collins

==== Senior A – Group D ====
Pos	Team	Pld	W	D	L	SF	SA	Diff	Pts
1	Oranmore–Maree	3	2	0	1	3-55	1-56	5	4
2	Sarsfields	3	2	0	1	2-64	4-51	7	4
3	Tommy Larkin's	3	1	1	1	3-53	2-58	-2	3
4	Cappataggle	3	0	1	2	2-51	3-58	-10	1

8 August 2025; 19:15; Round 1	Oranmore–Maree	2-19 - 1-21	Sarsfields	Kenny Park, Athenry; Referee: Liam Gordon
8 August 2025; 19:15; Round 1	Rory Burke (0-8; 0-6 frees); Diarmuid Hanniffy (1-1); Ryan O'Donnell (1-0); Colm Burke, Ruben Davitt (0-3); Niall Burke (0-2); Ross Malone, Conor Hanniffy (0-1)		Kevin Cooney (1-10, 0-8 frees); Adam Donoghue (0-3); Ian Fox, Paddy MacCarthaogh (0-2); John Cooney, Joseph Cooney, John Cosgrove, Darren Murphy (0-1)	Kenny Park, Athenry; Referee: Liam Gordon

9 August 2025; 17:00; Round 1	Cappataggle	2-17 - 1-20	Tommy Larkin's	Duggan Park; Referee: Karol Colins
9 August 2025; 17:00; Round 1	Liam Collins (1-4, 0-1 free); Cian Bowes (0-6; 0-4 frees, 0-1 '65); Jarlath Mannion (1-3); Michael Garvey, David Malone, Niall Collins, Oran Finn (0-1)		Kevin McHugo (1-9; 0-8 frees); Jason Flynn (0-3; 0-1 free); Tomas Lyons, Conor Slattery (0-2); Eanna Murphy (0-1 free); Adrian Moran, Ronan Murphy, Ben Shiel (0-1)	Duggan Park; Referee: Karol Colins

23 August 2025; 16:45; Round 2	Oranmore–Maree	1-20 - 0-16	Cappataggle	Kenny Park, Athenry; Referee: Conor Quinlan
23 August 2025; 16:45; Round 2	Rory Burke (0-10; 0-8 frees, 0-1 '65); Conor Hanniffy (1-1); Niall Burke (0-3); Colm Burke, Ruben Davitt (0-2); Ross Malone, Gearoid McInerney (0-1)		Niall Collins (0-8; 0-5 frees, 0-1 '65); Cian Bowes (0-4 frees); Jarlath Mannion (0-2); Liam Collins (0-1 free); Oran Finn (0-1)	Kenny Park, Athenry; Referee: Conor Quinlan

24 August 2025; 16:00; Round 2	Sarsfields	0-25 - 2-14	Tommy Larkin's	Kenny Park, Athenry; Referee: Paul Fahy
24 August 2025; 16:00; Round 2	Kevin Cooney (0-11; 0-5 frees); Alex Conaire (0-5); David Connaughton, Ian Fox (0-2); Adam Donoghue, Paddy MacCarthaigh, Darren Murphy, Diarmuid MacCarthaigh (0-1)		Jason Flynn (2-1; 2-0 frees); Kevin McHugo (0-3 frees); Eanna Murphy (0-2 frees); Ronan Murphy, Conor Gardiner (0-2); Cian Daniels, Adrian Moran, Conor Slattery, Ben Shiel (0-1)	Kenny Park, Athenry; Referee: Paul Fahy

6 September 2025; 18:00; Round 3	Sarsfields	1-18 - 0-18	Cappataggle	Duggan Park; Referee: Sean Byrne

6 September 2025; 18:00; Round 3	Tommy Larkin's	0-19 - 0-16	Oranmore–Maree	Kenny Park, Athenry; Referee: Noel Quinn

=== Senior A – Relegation ===
==== Senior A – Relegation Semi-finals ====
20 September 2025; Senior A – Relegation Semi-final	Cappataggle	2-15 - 0-16	Kilconieron	Loughrea; Referee: Brian Keon

20 September 2025; Senior A – Relegation Semi-final	Gort	2-11 - 0-15	Ardrahan	Kilbacanty; Referee: Liam Gordon

==== Senior A – Relegation Final ====
4 October; 15:00; Senior A – Relegation Final	Kilconieron	0-13 - 1-19	Ardrahan	Loughrea

=== Senior A – Preliminary Quarterfinals ===
The premilinary quarter-final draw was made on 7 September 2025

21 September 2025; Senior A – Preliminary Quarterfinal	Turloughmore	1-27 - 1-10	Killimordaly	Kenny Park, Athenry; Referee: Sean Byrne

21 September 2025; Senior A – Preliminary Quarterfinal	Sarsfields	1-31 - 2-24	Castlegar	Kenny Park, Athenry; Referee: Shane Hynes

21 September 2025; Senior A – Preliminary Quarterfinal	Loughrea	4-15 - 0-13	Moycullen	Pearse Stadium; Referee: Karol Collins

21 September 2025; Senior A – Preliminary Quarterfinal	Tommy Larkin's	2-22 - 2-11	Athenry	Duggan Park, Ballinasloe; Referee: Christopher Browne

=== Senior A – Quarterfinals ===
4 October 2025
14:15
Senior A – Quarterfinal
Craughwell
2-24 3-19
Sarsfields
Kenny Park, Athenry
Referee: B. Keon
C. Leen 1-13 (0-9f. 0-2 sl, 0-165)

A. Clarke 1-1 J. Ryan 0-3 O. Quirke 0-2 T. Monaghan 0-2(0-1f) T. Leen 0-1 D. McCartin 0-1 C. Gilligan 0-1

K. Cooney 2-7(0-6f)

D. MacCartaigh 1-2 I. Fox 0-2 A. Connaire 0-1 D. Murphy 0-1 Joseph Cooney 0-1 John Cooney 0-1 A. Donohue 0-1

4 October 2025; 16:00; Senior A – Quarterfinal	Oranmore–Maree	0-21 - 5-16	Turloughmore	Kenny Park, Athenry

5 October 2025; 14:15; Senior A – Quarterfinal	St Thomas'	1-18 - 0-19	Tommy Larkin's	Kenny Park, Athenry

5 October 2025; 16:00; Senior A – Quarterfinal	Clarinbridge	2-24 - 3-19	Loughrea	Kenny Park, Athenry

=== Senior A – Semifinals ===
18 October 2025; Senior A – Semifinal	St Thomas'	4-18 - 0-19	Craughwell

18 October 2025; Senior A – Semifinal	Loughrea	4-18 - 0-19	Turloughmore

=== Senior A – Final ===
1 November 2025; Senior A – Final	St Thomas'	1-14 - 1-15	Loughrea

== Senior B ==
Senior B consists of 8 teams divided into two groups of four. The format is:

- Group winners → Semi-finals
- 2nd and 3rd place → Quarterfinals (cross-play)
- Final winner → Promotion to Senior A
- Bottom teams → Relegation playoff

=== Senior B – Group A ===
Pos	Team	Pld	W	D	L	SF	SA	Diff	Pts
1	Kilnadeema–Leitrim	3	3	0	0	6-63	4-54	15	6
2	Ballinderreen	3	2	0	1	3-63	3-56	7	4
3	Liam Mellows	3	1	0	2	0-57	2-52	-1	2
4	Tynagh-Abbey/Duniry	3	0	0	3	4-48	4-69	-21	0

9 August 2025; 14:30; Round 1	Ballinderreen	1-16 - 0-17	Liam Mellows	Pearse Stadium; Referee: David Earls
9 August 2025; 14:30; Round 1	Roy Lane (0-7, 0-5 frees); Luke Prendergast (1-2); Kevin Lane (0-4); Michael Kelly (0-1 free); David O'Connor, Padraig Lafferty (0-1)		Adrian Morrissey (0-7; 0-3 frees); Tadhg Haran (0-4; 0-3 frees); Conor Kavanagh (0-3); Conor Elwood (0-2); Luke McPhilbin (0-1)	Pearse Stadium; Referee: David Earls

9 August 2025; 16:30; Round 1	Kilnadeema–Leitrim	3-22 - 3-14	Tynagh-Abbey/Duniry	Gort; Referee: Noel Quinn
9 August 2025; 16:30; Round 1	Colm Molloy (3-3); Jack Kenny (0-8; 0-5 frees); Jack O'Malley (0-3); Michael Lynch, Eanna Kenny (0-2); Daniel Comar (0-2; 0-1 free); Stephen Molloy, Liam Murray (0-1)		Shane Moloney (2-8; 2-6 frees); Niall Moloney (1-0); Jamie Ryan (0-2); David Jordan, Padraig Breheny, Conor Jordan, John Dervan (0-1)	Gort; Referee: Noel Quinn

23 August 2025; 16:00; Round 2	Liam Mellows	0-24 - 0-17	Tynagh-Abbey/Duniry	Loughrea; Referee: Kerril Wade
23 August 2025; 16:00; Round 2	Tadhg Haran (0-10; 0-8 frees); Adrian Morrissey (0-4; 0-1 free); Jack Hastings, Conor Hynes, Conor Kavanagh, Darren McPeake (0-2); Luke McPhilbin, Christopher Hogan (0-1)		Shane Moloney (0-9; 0-8 frees); Padraig Breheny, Niall Moloney, Thomas Murphy (0-2); Michael Power, Conor Jordan (0-1)	Loughrea; Referee: Kerril Wade

24 August 2025; 13:00; Round 2	Kilnadeema–Leitrim	2-22 - 1-24	Ballinderreen	Loughrea; Referee: Karol Collins
24 August 2025; 13:00; Round 2	Conor Molloy (0-6); Daniel O'Malley (1-1); Eanna Kenny (0-4); Vinny Kenny (1-0); Jack O'Malley (0-3); Jack Kenny (0-3; 0-2 frees); Stephen Molloy, Daniel Comar, Kevin Roche, Brian Molloy, Liam Murray (0-1)		Roy Lane (0-9; 0-5 frees; 0-1 '65); Shane Larkin (1-1); Robbie Meehan, Padraig Lafferty, Donnacha Ganly (0-3); Michael Kelly, Shane Cassidy, Kevin Lane, Luke Prendergast, David O'Connor (0-1)	Loughrea; Referee: Karol Collins

7 September 2025; 13:30; Round 3	Ballinderreen	1-23 - 1-17	Tynagh-Abbey/Duniry	Loughrea

7 September 2025; 13:30; Round 3	Kilnadeema–Leitrim	1-19 - 0-16	Liam Mellows	Kilbacanty; Referee: Peter Cummins

=== Senior B – Group B ===
Pos	Team	Pld	W	D	L	SF	SA	Diff	Pts
1	Ahascragh–Fohenagh	3	3	0	0	3-90	6-33	48	6
2	Padraig Pearses	3	2	0	1	8-50	3-58	7	4
3	Portumna	3	1	0	2	7-51	4-88	-28	2
4	Mullagh	3	0	0	3	2-61	7-73	-27	0

9 August 2025; 16:00; Round 1	Padraig Pearses	3-16 - 1-19	Mullagh	Loughrea; Referee: Kerril Wade
9 August 2025; 16:00; Round 1	Emmett Ward (2-0 penalties); Cillian Fahy (1-5); Jack Barrett (0-3; 0-1 free; 0-1 '65); Dean Reilly, Jonah Donnellan (0-2); Oisin Flannery, Ronan Bellew, Conor Fahy, Diarmuid Fahy (0-1)		Dean Finnerty (0-5; 0-2 frees); Ronan Glennon (0-4 frees); Keith Coen (Lurgan) (0-3); Tony Clarke (1-0); Liam Curley (0-2); Sean Hardiman, Cathal Kennedy, Damien Monaghan, Eoghan Gaffney, Conor Dolphin (0-1)	Loughrea; Referee: Kerril Wade

9 August 2025; 18:45; Round 1	Ahascragh–Fohenagh	1-36 - 3-9	Portumna	Duggan Park; Referee: Sean Byrne
9 August 2025; 18:45; Round 1	Cathal Mannion (0-17; 0-7 frees; 0-2 65's); Luke Kennedy (1-3); Robert Greene (0-5); Diarmuid O'Brien (0-2); Conor Kelly, Padraic Mannion, Luke Cosgrove, Ronan Kelly, Sean Bleahene, Mark Kelly, Luke Murray, Owen Naughton, Andrew Fitzgerald (0-1)		Joe Canning (2-5; 2-3 frees); Callum Keane (1-0); Andrew Canning (0-2); Declan McLaughlin, Adam Fogarty (0-1)	Duggan Park; Referee: Sean Byrne

23 August 2025; 16:15; Round 2	Padraig Pearses	3-23 - 2-14	Portumna	Duggan Park; Referee: Shane Bricoe
23 August 2025; 16:15; Round 2	Cillian Fahey (2-8; 0-8 frees); Luke Mitchell (1-2); Jonah Donnellan (0-5); Jack Barrett, Eric Ward, Dean Reilly (0-2); Diarmuid Fahy, Oran Burke (0-1)		Ronan O'Meara (1-3); Declan McLaughlin (1-2); Adam Fogarty (0-3); Joe Canning (0-3; 0-2 frees); Martin Tuohy (0-2); Jamie Hogan (0-1)	Duggan Park; Referee: Shane Bricoe

24 August 2025; 16:30; Round 2	Ahascragh–Fohenagh	2-29 - 1-13	Mullagh	Duggan Park
24 August 2025; 16:30; Round 2	Cathal Mannion (0-15; 0-6 frees, 0-1 '65); Diarmuid O'Brien (1-4); Robert Greene (1-1); Mark Kelly Sr (0-3); Cian Kelly, Padraic Mannion, Noel Warde, Sean Bleahene, Luke Murray, Owen Naughton (0-1)		Conor Dolphin (1-10; 0-8 frees, 0-2 '65s); Eoghan Gaffney (0-2); Liam Curley (0-1)	Duggan Park

7 September 2025; 14:00; Round 3	Portumna	2-28 - 0-29	Mullagh	Duggan Park

7 September 2025; 15:45; Round 3	Ahascragh–Fohenagh	0-25 - 2-11	Padraig Pearses	Duggan Park

=== Senior B – Quarter-finals ===
20 September 2025; Senior B – Quarter-final	Ballinderreen	0-24 - 2-14	Portumna	Kenny Park, Athenry; Referee: Conor Quinlan

20 September 2025; Senior B – Quarter-final	Liam Mellows	2-20 - 1-10	Padraig Pearses	Kenny Park, Athenry; Referee: Shane Briscoe

=== Senior B – Semi-finals ===
5 October 2025; 12:00; Senior B – Semi-final	Kilnadeema–Leitrim	2-21 - 2-23	Liam Mellows

5 October 2025; 13:45; Senior B – Semi-final	Ahascragh–Fohenagh	0-21 - 0-17	Ballinderreen

=== Senior B – Final ===
19 October 2025; 12:00; Senior B – Final	Ahascragh–Fohenagh	0-19 - 2-16	Liam Mellows
