= 1992 Galway Senior Hurling Championship =

Annual hurling competition season

- Champions: Sarsfields (3rd title); Pakine Cooney (captain)
- Runners-up: Carnmore; Murt Killilea (captain)

The 1992 Galway Senior Hurling Championship was the 95th completed staging of the Galway Senior Hurling Championship since its establishment by the Galway County Board in 1887.

Kiltormer entered the championship as the defending champions.

The final, a replay, was played on 15 November 1992 at Kenny Park in Athenry, between Sarsfields and Carnmore, in what was their first ever meeting in the final. Sarsfields won the match by 1–14 to 1–05 to claim their third championship title overall and their first title in three years.

== Results ==
=== Final ===
8 November 1992 Final	Sarsfields	0-14 - 1-11	Carnmore	Kenny Park

=== Final replay ===
15 November 1992 Final replay	Sarsfields	1-14 - 1-05	Carnmore	Kenny Park
