= Jim Power (hurler) =

Irish hurler (1895–1998)

Personal information
- Native name: Séamus de Paor (Irish)
- Born: 7 November 1895 Duniry, County Galway, Ireland
- Died: 21 May 1998 (aged 102) Tynagh, County Galway, Ireland

Sport
- Sport: Hurling
- Position: Full-back
Club
- Years: Club
- Tynagh
Club titles
- Galway titles: 5
Inter-county
- Years: County
- 1918-1928: Galway
Inter-county titles
- Connacht titles: 1
- All-Irelands: 1
- NHL: 0

James Power (7 November 1895 – 21 May 1998) was an Irish hurler who played as a full-back for the Galway senior teams.

Born in Duniry, County Galway, Power first arrived on the inter-county scene at the age of twenty-two when he first linked up with the Galway senior team, before later lining out with the junior side. He made his senior debut in the 1918 championship. Power went on to enjoy a ten-year inter-county career, and won one All-Ireland medal and one Connacht medal. He was an All-Ireland runner-up on two occasions.

Power represented the Connacht inter-provincial team on one occasion, however, he ended his career without a Railway Cup medals. At club level he won five championship medals with Tynagh.

His retirement came following the conclusion of the 1928 championship.

Power is the longest-lived All-Ireland medallist.

== Playing career ==
=== Club ===
Power played his club hurling with Tynagh and enjoyed much success during a lengthy career.

After losing back-to-back championship deciders in 1918 and 1919, Tynagh qualified for a third successive county final in 1920. A defeat of Kilconieron gave Power his first championship. medal.

After the suspension of the championship the following year, Tynagh reached the county decider once again in 1922. Galway City were defeated on that occasion with Power winning a second championship medal. Tynagh made it two-in-a-row in 1923 with Power adding a third medal to his collection following a defeat of Ardrahan.

Once again the championship was suspended in 1924, however, Tynagh continued their dominance on its resumption by reaching the county final again in 1925. Craughwell were defeated on this occasion as Power won his fourth championship medal.

After two years of no championship activity, Tynagh defeated Peterswell in the championship decider of 1928. It was Power's fifth and final championship medal.

=== Inter-county ===
Power first came to prominence on the inter-county scene as a member of the Galway senior team in 1918. He enjoyed little success in his first few years on the team, however, Galway captured the Connacht title in 1922 and gave a good account of themselves in a narrow defeat by Tipperary in the subsequent All-Ireland semi-final.

In 1923 Galway qualified for their first All-Ireland final in thirty-six years. After beating reigning champions Kilkenny at the penultimate stage, Galway now faced Limerick who were bidding for a third All-Ireland title in seven years. A high-scoring game developed, however, at half-time the sides were level. A hat-trick of goals by Leonard McGrath and powerful displays by Mick Gill and Mick Derivan helped Galway to a 7–3 to 4–5 victory. It was a first All-Ireland medal for Power.

Power was a key member of the team again in 1924 as Galway reached a second successive All-Ireland decider with Dublin providing the opposition. Galway played with the wind in the first half and led by three points at the break. Two goals by Dublin forward Garrett Howard and a great goalkeeping display by Tommy Daly ensured a 5–3 to 2–6 defeat for Galway. Kenny retired from inter-county hurling following this defeat.

After a number of years off the team Power returned in 1928, this time as captain of the team. Galway received a bye straight into the All-Ireland final with Cork providing the opposition. The westerners were completely overwhelmed with Mick "Gah" Ahern running riot and scoring 5–4. Power's side could only muster a single score during the hour and were eventually trounced by 6–12 to 1–0. After taking umbrage at the physical treatment of Mick King by some of the Cork players, Power threw his hurley onto the ground at the full-time whistle and decided to retire from hurling.

== Honours ==
=== Player ===
Tynagh

- Galway Senior Club Hurling Championship (5): 1920, 1922, 1923, 1925, 1928
- Galway Junior Club Hurling Championship (1): 1915

Galway

- All-Ireland Senior Hurling Championship (1): 1923
- Connacht Senior Hurling Championship (5): 1922

Sporting positions
Preceded by Andy Kelly	Galway Senior Hurling Captain; 1926-1928	Succeeded by Michael Cunningham
