= 1998 Galway Senior Hurling Championship =

Annual hurling competition season

- Champions: Athenry (4th title)
- Runners-up: Abbey/Duniry

The 1998 Galway Senior Hurling Championship was the 101st completed staging of the Galway Senior Hurling Championship since its establishment by the Galway County Board in 1887.

Sarsfields entered the championship as the defending champions.

The final, a replay, was played on 1 November 1998 at Duggan Park in Ballinasloe, between Athenry and Abbey/Duniry, in what was their first ever meeting in the final. Athenry won the match by 1–15 to 1–12 to claim their fourth championship title overall and a first title in two years.

== Results ==
=== Final ===
25 October 1998 Final	Athenry	1-09 - 1-06	Abbey/Duniry	Kenny Park

=== Final replay ===
1 November 1998 Final replay	Athenry	1-15 - 1-12	Abbey/Duniry	Duggan Park
