= 1988 Galway Senior Hurling Championship =

Annual hurling competition season

- Champions: Abbeyknockmoy (1st title)
- Runners-up: Athenry

The 1988 Galway Senior Hurling Championship was the 91st completed staging of the Galway Senior Hurling Championship since its establishment by the Galway County Board in 1887.

Athenry entered the championship as the defending champions.

The final, a replay, was played on 30 October 1988 at Duggan Park in Ballinasloe, between Abbeyknockmoy and Athenry, in what was their first ever meeting in the final. Athenry won the match by 2–06 to 0–11 to claim their first ever championship title. It remains their only championship title.

== Results ==
=== Final ===
23 October 1988 Final	Abbeyknockmoy	2-08 - 2-08	Athenry	Duggan Park

=== Final replay ===
30 October 1988 Final replay	Abbeyknockmoy	2-06 - 0-11	Athenry	Duggan Park
