= 1965 Galway Senior Hurling Championship =

Annual hurling competition season

- Champions: Turloughmore (6th title)
- Runners-up: Killimordaly

The 1965 Galway Senior Hurling Championship was the 68th completed staging of the Galway Senior Hurling Championship since its establishment by the Galway County Board in 1887.

Turloughmore entered the championship as the defending champions.

The final was played on 17 October 1965 at Duggan Park in Ballinasloe, between Turloughmore and Killimordaly, in what was their first ever meeting in the final. Turloughmore won the match by 7–04 to 4–11 to claim their sixth championship title overall and a record-equalling fifth consecutive title.

== Results ==
=== Final ===
17 October 1965 Final	Turloughmore	7-04 - 4-11	Killimordaly	Duggan Park
