= 1985 Galway Senior Hurling Championship =

Annual hurling competition season

- Champions: Turloughmore (8th title)
- Runners-up: Killimordaly

The 1985 Galway Senior Hurling Championship was the 88th completed staging of the Galway Senior Hurling Championship since its establishment by the Galway County Board in 1887.

Castlegar entered the championship as the defending champions. It remains their last championship title.

The final was played on 6 October 1985 at Kenny Park in Athenry, between Turloughmore and Killimordaly, in what was their second meeting in the final overall. Turloughmore won the match by 1–14 to 1–04 to claim their eighth championship title overall and a first title in 19 years. It remains their only championship title It remains their last championship title.

== Results ==
=== Final ===
| 6 October 1985 Final | Turloughmore | 1-14 - 1-04 | Killimordaly | Kenny Park |
