= 2009 Galway Senior Hurling Championship =

Annual hurling competition season

- Champions: Portumna (5th title); Leo Smith (captain); Johnny Kelly (manager)
- Runners-up: Loughrea

The 2009 Galway Senior Hurling Championship was the 112th completed staging of the Galway Senior Hurling Championship since its establishment by the Galway County Board in 1887.

Portumna entered the championship as the defending champions.

The final was played on 15 November 2009 at Pearse Stadium in Galway, between Portumna and Loughrea, in what was their fourth meeting in the final overall and a first meeting in three years. Portumna won the match by 5–19 to 1–13 to claim their fifth championship title overall and a third consecutive title.

== Results ==
=== Final ===
15 November 2009 Final	Portumna	5-19 - 1-13	Loughrea	Pearse Stadium
	J Canning 1-10, (1-8f) (2 '65); D Hayes 3-3; M Dolphin 1-1; K Hayes 0-3; A Smith 0-1, E Lynch 0-1.	Report	N Keary 0-8 (7f); J Maher 1-1; J O'Loughlin 0-1, K Colleran 0-1, E Mahony 0-1.
