= 1986 Galway Senior Hurling Championship =

Annual hurling competition season

- Champions: Killimordaly (1st title)
- Runners-up: Turloughmore

The 1986 Galway Senior Hurling Championship was the 89th completed staging of the Galway Senior Hurling Championship since its establishment by the Galway County Board in 1887.

Turloughmore entered the championship as the defending champions.

The final was played on 2 November 1986 at Duggan Park in Ballinasloe, between Killimordaly and Turloughmore, in what was their third meeting in the final overall. Killimordaly won the match by 0–17 to 2–07 to claim their first ever championship title. It remains their only championship title.

== Results ==
=== Final ===
2 November 1986 Final	Killimordaly	0-17 - 2-07	Turloughmore	Duggan Park
