= 2011 Galway Senior Hurling Championship =

Annual hurling competition season

- Champions: Gort (6th title); Andy Coen (captain)
- Runners-up: Clarinbridge

The 2011 Galway Senior Hurling Championship was the 114th completed staging of the Galway Senior Hurling Championship since its establishment by the Galway County Board in 1887.

Clarinbridge entered the championship as the defending champions.

The final was played on 6 November 2011 at Pearse Stadium in Galway, between Gort and Clarinbridge, in what was their first ever meeting in the final. Gort won the match by 0–17 to 1–12 to claim their sixth championship title overall and a first title in 28 years.

== Results ==
=== Final ===
| 6 November 2011 Final | Gort | 0-17 - 1-12 | Clarinbridge | Pearse Stadium |
| | | Report |
