= 1984 Galway Senior Hurling Championship =

Annual hurling competition season

- Champions: Castlegar (17th title); Michael Connolly (captain)
- Runners-up: Killimordaly; Michael Earls (captain)

Tournament statistics
- Top scorer(s): Michael Haverty (2-37)

The 1984 Galway Senior Hurling Championship was the 87th completed staging of the Galway Senior Hurling Championship since its establishment by the Galway County Board in 1887.

Gort entered the championship as the defending champions.

The final was played on 30 September 1984 at Pearse Stadium in Salthill, between Castlegar and Killimordaly, in what was their first ever meeting in the final. Castlegar won the match by 3–10 to 0–11 to claim their 17th championship title overall and a first title in five years. It remains their last championship title.

Castlegar's Michael Haverty was the championship's top scorer with 2-37.

== Results ==
=== Final ===
30 September 1984 Final	Castlegar	2-12 - 3-06	Killimordaly	Pearse Stadium
