= Michael Conneely =

Irish hurler (born 1949)

Personal information
- Native name: Mícheál Mac Conghaola (Irish)
- Nickname: Big Mike
- Born: 14 July 1949 (age 77) Bullaun, County Galway, Ireland
- Occupation: Financial consultant
- Height: 6 ft 3 in (191 cm)

Sport
- Sport: Hurling
- Position: Goalkeeper
Club
- Years: Club
- Sarsfields
Club titles
- Galway titles: 1
- Connacht titles: 1
- All-Ireland Titles: 0
Inter-county*
Years	County	Apps (scores)
1974–1981	Galway	14 (0-00)
Inter-county titles
- All-Irelands: 1
- NHL: 1
- All Stars: 0
- *Inter County team apps and scores correct as of 15:11, 25 January 2013.

Michael Conneely (born 14 July 1949) is an Irish former hurler who played as a goalkeeper for the Galway senior team.

Born in Bullaun, County Galway, Conneely first arrived on the inter-county scene at the age of twenty-five when he made his senior debut with Galway in the 1974 championship. Conneely went on to play a key role for Galway, and won one All-Ireland medal and one National Hurling League medal. He was an All-Ireland runner-up on two occasions.

As a member of the Connacht inter-provincial team at various times, Conneely enjoyed little success in the Railway Cup medal. At club level he was a one-time Connacht medallist with Sarfields. In addition to this he also won one championship medals.

Throughout his career, Conneely made 14 championship appearances for Galway. His retirement came following the conclusion of the 1981 championship.

After retiring from playing, Conneely became involved in team management and coaching. At club level he managed Sarsfields to back-to-back All-Ireland titles. Conneely later served as manager of the Roscommon and Westmeath senior teams.

== Playing career ==
=== Club ===
In 1980 Sarsfields qualified for the final of senior championship for the first time in history, with Conneely lining out as goalkeeper. The accurate free-taking of Michael Mulkerrins secured a narrow 0–11 to 0–9 defeat of Meelick-Eyrecourt and a Galway Senior Hurling Championship medal for Connelly. He later added a Connacht medal to his collection following a convincing 4–12 to 0–5 defeat of Tremane.

=== Inter-county ===
Conneely made his senior championship debut for Galway on 21 July 1974 in a 3–13 to 0–6 defeat of London in the All-Ireland quarter-final.

In 1975 Galway made a long-awaited breakthrough. A 4–9 to 4–6 defeat of Tipperary gave Conneely a National Hurling League medal. Galway later qualified for an All-Ireland final meeting with reigning champions Kilkenny, their first appearance in the championship decider in seventeen years and the very first seventy-minute final. Playing with the wind in the first half, Galway found themselves 0–9 to 1–3 down at the interval having played poorly. Early in the second half Kilkenny scored an early 1–3 to put this game to bed, and although Galway did reply with 1–1 and were only four points behind with twenty-five minutes left on the clock, there was never any doubt in this match. Galway were eventually defeated by 2–22 to 2–10.

After being replaced in goal by Séamus Shinnors for the 1979 championship, Conneely was back as custodian in 1980 as Galway reached the All-Ireland decider once again. Limerick provided the opposition on this occasion and an exciting championship decider followed. Bernie Forde and P. J. Molloy goals for Galway meant that the men from the west led by 2–7 to 1–5 at half-time. Éamonn Cregan single-handedly launched the Limerick counter-attack in the second-half. Over the course of the game he scored 2–7, including an overhead goal and a point in which he showed the ball to full-back Conor Hayes and nonchalantly drove the ball over the bar. It was not enough to stem the tide and Galway went on to win the game by 2–15 to 3–9. It was Galway's first All-Ireland title since 1923, with Conneely picking up a winners' medal.

1981 saw Galway reach a third consecutive All-Ireland final and Offaly were the opponents. Everything seemed to be going well for Conneely's side as Galway hoped to capture a second consecutive All-Ireland title. Offaly keeper Damien Martin was doing great work in batting out an almost certain Galway goal early in the second-half. With twenty-three minutes left in the game Galway led by six points, however, they failed to score for the rest of the game. Johnny Flaherty hand-passed Offaly's second goal with just three minutes remaining. At the long whistle Galway were defeated by 2–12 to 0–15.

== Managerial career ==
=== Sarsfields ===
Conneely began his coaching career at club level with Sarsfields. In 1992 he guided the club to the final of the county championship where they faced Carnmore. After being seven points down at one stage, Carnmore staged a seven-point comeback to level the match and force a replay. At the second time of asking Sarfields claimed the championship title by 1–14 to 1–5. Conneely later guided the club to the Connacht title, following a 2–15 to 0–7 defeat of Oran. The subsequent All-Ireland decider pitted Sarsfields against Kilmallock. The Galway champions edged into a 0–11 to 1–1 half-time lead, but in the second half Kilmallock staged a mini revival scoring 1–1, but that was as good as it got for the Limerick side. A 1–17 to 2–7 victory gave Sarsfields the All-Ireland title.

Sarsfields retained their championship title in 1993, following a 1–10 to 0–4 defeat of Carnmore once again. Four Roads fell by 5–12 to 0–7 in the subsequent provincial decider. Once again Sarsfields reached the All-Ireland final, with Tipp champions Toomevara providing the opposition. Conneely's side trailed by 2–4 to 0–4 at the interval, however, Sarsfields staged a stunning second-half comeback. The Galway club drew level early in the second half before Toomevara goaled again, and with five minutes remained things looked good for Toomevara leading 3–6 to 0–12. Michael Kenny goaled for Sarsfields and a 65-metre free from Aidan Donohue sealed a 1–14 to 3–6 victory.

=== Roscommon ===
Conneely was appointed manager of the Roscommon senior team in 1998. His two-year tenure in charge saw little in terms of success, as Roscommon were defeated by Galway in the provincial series.

In 2005 Conneely returned for a second stint as Roscommon manager. It was a disappointing year for Roscommon as the team, having lost all their Christy Ring Cup group stage matches, were eventually relegated to the Nicky Rackard Cup.

=== Westmeath ===
In 2001 Conneely took over as manager of the Westmeath senior team. His two years in charge brought little in terms of success, as Westmeath made little progress in the Leinster series of games.

== Honours ==
=== Player ===
Sarsfields

- Connacht Senior Club Hurling Championship (1): 1980
- Galway Senior Club Hurling Championship (1): 1980

Galway

- All-Ireland Senior Hurling Championship (1): 1980
- National Hurling League (1): 1974–75

=== Manager ===
Sarsfields

- All-Ireland Senior Club Hurling Championship (2): 1993, 1994
- Connacht Senior Club Hurling Championship (2): 1992, 1993
- Galway Senior Club Hurling Championship (2): 1992, 1993

Sporting positions
Preceded by Michael Kelly	Roscommon Senior Hurling Manager; 1998–2000	Succeeded by Brian McDonnell
Preceded by Michael Cosgrove	Westmeath Senior Hurling Manager; 2001–2003	Succeeded by Tom Ryan
Preceded by Anthony Cunningham	Roscommon Senior Hurling Manager; 2005–2006	Succeeded by Dave McConn
