= 1982 Galway Senior Hurling Championship =

Annual hurling competition season

- Champions: Kiltormer (3rd title)
- Runners-up: Castlegar

The 1982 Galway Senior Hurling Championship was the 85th completed staging of the Galway Senior Hurling Championship since its establishment by the Galway County Board in 1887.

Gort entered the championship as the defending champions.

The final was played on 25 July 1982 at Duggan Park in Ballinasloe, between Kiltormer and Castlegar, in what was their first ever meeting in the final. Kiltormer won the match by 2–08 to 1–09 to claim their third championship title overall and a first title in five years.

== Results ==
=== Final ===
25 July 1982 Final	Kiltormer	2-08 - 1-09	Castlegar	Duggan Park
