= 1979 Galway Senior Hurling Championship =

Annual hurling competition season

- Champions: Castlegar (16th title); Joe Connolly (captain)
- Runners-up: Kinvara; Kevin Huban (captain)

The 1979 Galway Senior Hurling Championship was the 82nd completed staging of the Galway Senior Hurling Championship since its establishment by the Galway County Board in 1887.

Ardrahan entered the championship as the defending champions, however, they were beaten by Kinvara in the second round.

The final was played on 2 December 1979 at Duggan Park in Ballinasloe, between Castlegar and Kinvara, in what was their first ever meeting in the final. Castlegar won the match by 2–13 to 0–06 to claim their 16th championship title overall and a first title in six years.

== Results ==
=== Final ===
2 December 1979 Final	Castlegar	2-13 - 0-06	Kinvara	Duggan Park
