= 1980 Galway Senior Hurling Championship =

Annual hurling competition season

- Champions: Sarsfields (1st title)
- Runners-up: Meelick–Eyrecourt

The 1980 Galway Senior Hurling Championship was the 83rd completed staging of the Galway Senior Hurling Championship since its establishment by the Galway County Board in 1887.

Castlegar entered the championship as the defending champions.

The final was played on 10 August 1980 at Duggan Park in Ballinasloe, between Sarsfields and Meelick–Eyrecourt, in what was their first ever meeting in the final. Sarsfields won the match by 0–11 to 0–09 to claim their first ever championship title.

== Results ==
=== Final ===
10 August 1980 Final	Sarsfields	0-11 - 0-09	Meelick–Eyrecourt	Duggan Park
