= 1987 Galway Senior Hurling Championship =

Annual hurling competition season

- Champions: Athenry (1st title); Mattie Gannon (captain)
- Runners-up: Castlegar

The 1987 Galway Senior Hurling Championship was the 90th completed staging of the Galway Senior Hurling Championship since its establishment by the Galway County Board in 1887.

Killimordaly entered the championship as the defending champions.

The final was played on 18 October 1987 at Duggan Park in Ballinasloe, between Athenry and Castlegar, in what was their first ever meeting in the final. Athenry won the match by 1–12 to 2–06 to claim their first ever championship title.

== Results ==
=== Final ===
18 October 1987 Final	Athenry	1-12 - 2-06	Castlegar	Duggan Park
