= 1966 Galway Senior Hurling Championship =

Annual hurling competition season

- Champions: Turloughmore (7th title)
- Runners-up: Mullagh

The 1966 Galway Senior Hurling Championship was the 69th completed staging of the Galway Senior Hurling Championship since its establishment by the Galway County Board in 1887.

Turloughmore entered the championship as the defending champions.

The final was played on 18 September 1966 at Kenny Park in Athenry, between Turloughmore and Mullagh, in what was their first ever meeting in the final. Turloughmore won the match by 4–08 to 2–08 to claim their seventh championship title overall and a record sixth consecutive title.

== Results ==
=== Final ===
18 September 1966 Final	Turloughmore	4-08 - 2-08	Killimordaly	Kenny Park
