= 1997 Galway Senior Hurling Championship =

Annual hurling competition season

- Champions: Sarsfields (6th title); P. Kelly (captain)
- Runners-up: Clarinbridge; L. O'Donoghue (captain)

The 1997 Galway Senior Hurling Championship was the 100th completed staging of the Galway Senior Hurling Championship since its establishment by the Galway County Board in 1887.

Athenry entered the championship as the defending champions.

The final was played on 30 November 1997 at Kenny Park in Athenry, between Sarsfields and Clarinbridge, in what was their first ever meeting in the final. Sarsfields won the match by 1–11 to 1–06 to claim their sixth championship title overall and a first title in two years.

== Results ==
=== Final ===
30 November 1997 Final	Sarsfields	1-11 - 1-06	Clarinbridge	Kenny Park
