= 2004 Galway Senior Hurling Championship =

Annual hurling competition season

- Champions: Athenry (8th title); Eugene Cloonan (captain)
- Runners-up: Portumna; Ollie Canning (captain)

The 2004 Galway Senior Hurling Championship was the 107th completed staging of the Galway Senior Hurling Championship since its establishment by the Galway County Board in 1887.

Portumna entered the championship as the defending champions.

The final was played on 31 October 2004 at Pearse Stadium in Galway, between Atheny and Portumna, in what was their first ever meeting in the final. Athenry won the match by 0–15 to 0–13 to claim their eighth championship title overall and a first title in two years. It remains their last championship title.

== Results ==
=== Final ===
31 October 2004 Final	Athenry	0-15 - 0-13	Portumna	Pearse Stadium
	E Cloonan 0-8 (5f, 2 '65'), D Donoghue 0-3, D Moran 0-2, MJ Quinn, D Carroll 0-1 each.		A Smith 0-7 (5f), K Hayes, J Canning (1f) 0-2 each, D Hayes, G Heagney 0-1 each.
