= 1983 Galway Senior Hurling Championship =

Annual hurling competition season

- Champions: Gort (5th title)
- Runners-up: Castlegar

The 1983 Galway Senior Hurling Championship was the 86th completed staging of the Galway Senior Hurling Championship since its establishment by the Galway County Board in 1887.

Kiltormer entered the championship as the defending champions.

The final was played on 23 October 1983 at St Brendan's Park in Loughrea, between Gort and Castlegar, in what was their third meeting in the final overall. Gort won the match by 2–12 to 3–06 to claim their fifth championship title overall and a first title in two years.

== Results ==
=== Final ===
23 October 1983 Final	Gort	2-12 - 3-06	Castlegar	St Brendan's Park
