= 1974 Galway Senior Hurling Championship =

Annual hurling competition season

- Champions: Ardrahan (9th title)
- Runners-up: Castlegar

The 1974 Galway Senior Hurling Championship was the 77th completed staging of the Galway Senior Hurling Championship since its establishment by the Galway County Board in 1887.

Castlegar entered the championship as the defending champions, however, they were beaten by Kinvara in the second round.

The final was played on 15 September 1974 at Duggan Park in Ballinasloe, between Ardrahan and Castlegar, in what was their third meeting in the final overall. Ardrahan won the match by 2–10 to 1–10 to claim their ninth championship title overall and a first title in 25 years.

== Results ==
=== Final ===
15 September 1974 Final	Ardrahan	2-10 - 1-10	Castlegar	Duggan Park
