= 1994 Galway Senior Hurling Championship =

Annual hurling competition season

- Champions: Athenry (2nd title); Pat Higgins (captain)
- Runners-up: Sarsfields

The 1994 Galway Senior Hurling Championship was the 97th completed staging of the Galway Senior Hurling Championship since its establishment by the Galway County Board in 1887.

Sarsfields entered the championship as the defending champions.

The final was played on 30 October 1994 at Duggan Park in Ballinasloe, between Athenry and Sarsfields, in what was their second meeting in the final. Athenry won the match by 2–06 to 0–09 to claim their second championship title overall and a first title in seven years.

== Results ==
=== Final ===
30 October 1994 Final	Athenry	2-06 - 0-09	Sarsfields	Duggan Park
