= 1972 Galway Senior Hurling Championship =

Annual hurling competition season

- Champions: Castlegar (14th title)
- Runners-up: Turloughmore

The 1972 Galway Senior Hurling Championship was the 75th completed staging of the Galway Senior Hurling Championship since its establishment by the Galway County Board in 1887.

Tommy Larkin's entered the championship as the defending champions, however, they were beaten by Kinvara in the second round.

The final was played on 29 October 1972 at Pearse Stadium in Salthill, between Castlegar and Turloughmore, in what was their second meeting in the final overall. Castlegar won the match by 5–05 to 0–08 to claim their 14th championship title overall and a first title in three years.

== Results ==
=== Final ===
29 October 1972 Final	Castlegar	5-05 - 0-08	Turloughmore	Pearse Stadium
