= 2007 Galway Senior Hurling Championship =

Annual hurling competition season

- Champions: Portumna (3rd title); Ollie Canning (captain); Jimmy Heverin (manager)
- Runners-up: Kinvara

The 2007 Galway Senior Hurling Championship was the 110th completed staging of the Galway Senior Hurling Championship since its establishment by the Galway County Board in 1887.

Loughrea entered the championship as the defending champions.

The final was played on 21 October 2007 at Pearse Stadium in Galway, between Portumna and Kinvara, in what was their first ever meeting in the final. Portumna won the match by 6–12 to 0–11 to claim their third championship title overall and a first title in two years.

== Results ==
=== Final ===
21 October 2007 Final	Portumna	6-21 - 0-11	Kinvara	Pearse Stadium
	J Canning 3-4 (0-3f, 0-1 sl), N Hayes 2-1, A Smith 1-1, D Hayes 0-3, E Lynch 0-2, L Smith 0-1.	Report	David Huban 0-7 (6f), A Byrne 0-2, C Kavanagh, Damien Huban 0-1 each.
