= 1996 Galway Senior Hurling Championship =

Annual hurling competition season

- Champions: Athenry (3rd title); Brian Feeney (captain)
- Runners-up: Carnmore; Ronan Walsh (captain)

The 1996 Galway Senior Hurling Championship was the 99th completed staging of the Galway Senior Hurling Championship since its establishment by the Galway County Board in 1887.

Sarsfields entered the championship as the defending champions.

The final was played on 1 December 1996 at Kenny Park in Athenry, between Athenry and Carnmore, in what was their first ever meeting in the final. Athenry won the match by 2–06 to 1–06 to claim their third championship title overall and a first title in two years.

== Results ==
=== Final ===
1 December 1996 Final	Athenry	2-06 - 1-06	Carnmore	Kenny Park
