= 1999 Galway Senior Hurling Championship =

Annual hurling competition season

- Champions: Athenry (5th title)
- Runners-up: Abbey/Duniry

The 1999 Galway Senior Hurling Championship was the 102nd completed staging of the Galway Senior Hurling Championship since its establishment by the Galway County Board in 1887.

Athenry entered the championship as the defending champions.

The final was played on 24 October 1999 at Duggan Park in Ballinasloe, between Athenry and Abbey/Duniry, in what was their second consecutive meeting in the final. Athenry won the match by 1–16 to 1–10 to claim their fifth championship title overall and a second consecutive title.

== Results ==
=== Final ===
24 October 1990 Final	Athenry	1-16 - 1-10	Abbey/Duniry	Duggan Park
	D Moran 1-2, E Cloonan 0-4 (all f), C Moran 0-3, P Higgins 0-2, P Hardiman, B Keogh, B Hanley, J Rabbitte, D Donoghue 0-1 each.	Report	M Kenny 0-7 (all f), K Broderick 1-2, P J Kenny 0-1.
