= 1989 Galway Senior Hurling Championship =

Annual hurling competition season

- Champions: Sarsfields (2nd title)
- Runners-up: Athenry

The 1989 Galway Senior Hurling Championship was the 92nd completed staging of the Galway Senior Hurling Championship since its establishment by the Galway County Board in 1887.

Abbeyknockmoy entered the championship as the defending champions.

The final was played on 16 October 1989 at St Brendan's Park in Loughrea, between Sarsfields and Athenry, in what was their first ever meeting in the final. Sarsfields won the match by 3–07 to 1–08 to claim their second championship title overall and a first title in nine years.

== Results ==
=== Final ===
| 16 October 1989 Final | Sarsfields | 3-07 - 1-08 | Athenry | St Brendan's Park |
