= 1981 Galway Senior Hurling Championship =

Annual hurling competition season

- Champions: Gort (4th title)
- Runners-up: Kiltormer

The 1981 Galway Senior Hurling Championship was the 84th completed staging of the Galway Senior Hurling Championship since its establishment by the Galway County Board in 1887.

Sarsfields entered the championship as the defending champions.

The final, a replay, was played on 15 November 1981 at Duggan Park in Ballinasloe, between Gort and Kiltormer, in what was their first ever meeting in the final. Gort won the match by 2–06 to 0–08 to claim their fourth championship title overall and a first title in 47 years.

== Results ==
=== Final ===
| 8 November 1981 Final | Gort | 2-08 - 1-11 | Kiltormer | Duggan Park |

=== Final replay ===
| 15 November 1981 Final replay | Gort | 2-06 - 0-08 | Kiltormer | Duggan Park |
