= 1976 Galway Senior Hurling Championship =

Annual hurling competition season

- Champions: Kiltormer (1st title)
- Runners-up: Killimordaly

The 1976 Galway Senior Hurling Championship was the 79th completed staging of the Galway Senior Hurling Championship since its establishment by the Galway County Board in 1887.

Ardrahan entered the championship as the defending champions.

The final was played on 10 October 1976 at Pearse Stadium in Galway, between Kiltormer and Killimordaly, in what was their first ever meeting in the final. Kiltormer won the match by 1–09 to 1–06 to claim their first ever championship title .

== Results ==
=== Final ===
10 October 1976 Final	Kiltormer	1-09 - 1-06	Killimordaly	Pearse Stadium
