= 2010 Galway Senior Hurling Championship =

Annual hurling competition season

- Champions: Clarinbridge (2nd title); Paul Callanan (captain); Micheál Donoghue (manager)
- Runners-up: Loughrea; Brian Mahony (captain); Joe Sweeney (manager)

The 2010 Galway Senior Hurling Championship was the 113th completed staging of the Galway Senior Hurling Championship since its establishment by the Galway County Board in 1887.

Portumna entered the championship as the defending champions.

The final, a replay, was played on 21 November 2010 at the Athenry Grounds, between Clarinbridge and Loughrea, in what was their first ever meeting in the final. Clarinbridge won the match by 0–18 to 0–15 to claim their second championship title overall and a first title in nine years.

== Results ==
=== Final ===
31 October 2010 Final	Clarinbridge	2-11 - 1-14	Loughrea	Pearse Stadium

=== Final replay ===
21 November 2010 Final	Clarinbridge	0-18 - 0-15 (aet)	Loughrea	Athenry Grounds
	M Kerins 0-8 (0-6f), P Coen 0-4 (0-3f, 0-1 '65); B Daly 0-2, E Murphy, E Forde, A Kerins, S Forde 0-1 each.	Report	N Keary 0-9 (0-8f, 0-1 '65), J Maher 0-3, J O'Loughlin, K Colleran, J Coen 0-1.
