= 2008 Galway Senior Hurling Championship =

Annual hurling competition season

- Champions: Portumna (4th title); Ollie Canning (captain); Johnny Kelly (manager)
- Runners-up: Gort

The 2008 Galway Senior Hurling Championship was the 111th completed staging of the Galway Senior Hurling Championship since its establishment by the Galway County Board in 1887.

Portumna entered the championship as the defending champions.

The final was played on 2 November 2008 at Pearse Stadium in Galway, between Portumna and Gort, in what was their first ever meeting in the final. Portumna won the match by 1–18 to 2–07 to claim their fourth championship title overall and a second consecutive title.

== Results ==
=== Final ===
2 November 2008 Final	Portumna	1-18 - 2-07	Gort	Pearse Stadium
	J Canning 0-10 (0-6 f, 0-1 line-cut), D Hayes 0-4, A Smith 1-0, N Hayes 0-2, L Smith, O Canning 0-1 each.	Report	G Quinn 1-3 (all frees), O Fahy 1-1, P Killilea, M Nestor and R Cummins 0-1 each.
