= 1962 Galway Senior Hurling Championship =

Annual hurling competition season

- Champions: Turloughmore (3rd title)
- Runners-up: Castlegar

The 1962 Galway Senior Hurling Championship was the 65th completed staging of the Galway Senior Hurling Championship since its establishment by the Galway County Board in 1887.

Turloughmore entered the championship as the defending champions.

The final, a replay, was played on 30 October 1962 at Pearse Stadium in Galway, between Turloughmore and Castlegar, in what was their first ever meeting in the final. Turloughmore won the match by 7–10 to 0–09 to claim their third championship title overall and a second consecutive title.

== Results ==
=== Final ===
9 September 1962 Final	Turloughmore	2-09 - 2-09	Castlegar	Pearse Stadium

=== Final replay ===
30 September 1962 Final replay	Turloughmore	7-10 - 0-09	Castlegar	Pearse Stadium
