= 1963 Galway Senior Hurling Championship =

Annual hurling competition season

- Champions: Turloughmore (4th title)
- Runners-up: Fohenagh

The 1963 Galway Senior Hurling Championship was the 66th completed staging of the Galway Senior Hurling Championship since its establishment by the Galway County Board in 1887.

Turloughmore entered the championship as the defending champions.

The final was played on 11 August 1963 at Pearse Stadium in Galway, between Turloughmore and Fohenagh, in what was their second meeting in the final overal. Turloughmore won the match by 5–13 to 2–04 to claim their fourth championship title overall and a third consecutive title.

== Results ==
=== Final ===
11 August 1963 Final	Turloughmore	5-13 - 2-04	Fohenagh	Pearse Stadium
