= 2000 Galway Senior Hurling Championship =

Annual hurling competition season

- Champions: Athenry (6th title); Joe Rabbitte (captain)
- Runners-up: Sarsfields

The 2000 Galway Senior Hurling Championship was the 103rd completed staging of the Galway Senior Hurling Championship since its establishment by the Galway County Board in 1887.

Athenry entered the championship as the defending champions.

The final was played on 29 October 2000 at Duggan Park in Ballinasloe, between Athenry and Sarsfields, in what was their third meeting in the final overall. Athenry won the match by 2–14 to 3–07 to claim their sixth championship title overall and a third consecutive title.

== Results ==
=== Final ===
29 October 2000 Final	Athenry	0-18 - 2-11	Sarsfields	Duggan Park
