= 1975 Galway Senior Hurling Championship =

Annual hurling competition season

- Champions: Ardrahan (10th title)
- Runners-up: Carnmore

The 1975 Galway Senior Hurling Championship was the 78th completed staging of the Galway Senior Hurling Championship since its establishment by the Galway County Board in 1887.

Ardrahan entered the championship as the defending champions.

The final was played on 12 October 1975 at Pearse Stadium in Salthill, between Ardrahan and Carnmore, in what was their first ever meeting in the final. Ardrahan won the match by 4–05 to 1–11 to claim their 10th championship title overall and a second consecutive title.

== Results ==
=== Final ===
12 October 1975 Final	Ardrahan	4-05 - 1-11	Carnmore	Pearse Stadium
