= 2005 Galway Senior Hurling Championship =

Annual hurling competition season

- Champions: Portumna (2nd title); Eugene McEntee (captain); Jimmy Heverin (manager)
- Runners-up: Loughrea

The 2005 Galway Senior Hurling Championship was the 108th completed staging of the Galway Senior Hurling Championship since its establishment by the Galway County Board in 1887.

Athenry entered the championship as the defending champions.

The final was played on 13 November 2005 at Pearse Stadium in Galway, between Portumna and Loughrea, in what was their second meeting in the final overall. Portumna won the match by 3–21 to 3–14 to claim their second championship title overall and a first title in two years.

== Results ==
=== Final ===
13 November 2005 Final	Portumna	3-21 - 3-14	Loughrea	Pearse Stadium
	J Canning 1-11 (0-8f, 0-1 sideline), D Hayes 2-6, D Canning 0-1, A Smith 0-1 (1f), N Hayes 0-1, E McEntee 0-1.	https://www.independent.ie/sport/gaelic-games/hurling/canning-and-hayes-just-too-hot-to-handle/25956580.html Report]	J O'Loughlin 1-5 (5f), N Shaughnessy 0-4 (1f), E McMahon 0-3, B Dooley 1-0, K Colleran 1-0, G Keary 0-1, G Kennedy 0-1.
