= 1973 Galway Senior Hurling Championship =

Annual hurling competition season

- Champions: Castlegar (15th title)
- Runners-up: Ballinasloe

The 1973 Galway Senior Hurling Championship was the 76th completed staging of the Galway Senior Hurling Championship since its establishment by the Galway County Board in 1887.

Castlegar entered the championship as the defending champions.

The final, a replay, was played on 26 August 1973 at Duggan Park in Ballinasloe, between Castlegar and Ballinasloe, in what was their second meeting in the final overall. Castlegar won the match by 4–11 to 3–10 to claim their 15th championship title overall and a second consecutive title.

== Results ==
=== Final ===
22 July 1973 Final	Castlegar	3-10 - 2-13	Ballinasloe	Pearse Stadium

=== Final replay ===
26 August 1973 Final replay	Castlegar	4-11 - 3-10	Ballinasloe	Duggan Park
