= 1977 Galway Senior Hurling Championship =

Annual hurling competition season

- Champions: Kiltormer (2nd title)
- Runners-up: Athenry

The 1977 Galway Senior Hurling Championship was the 80th completed staging of the Galway Senior Hurling Championship since its establishment by the Galway County Board in 1887.

Kiltormer entered the championship as the defending champions.

The final was played on 18 September 1977 at Duggan Park in Ballinasloe, between Kiltormer and Athenry, in what was their first ever meeting in the final. Kiltormer won the match by 3–10 to 3–08 to claim their second consecutive championship title.

== Results ==
=== Final ===
18 September 1977 Final	Kiltormer	3-10 - 3-08	Athenry	Duggan Park
