= 1971 Galway Senior Hurling Championship =

Annual hurling competition season

- Champions: Tommy Larkin's (1st title)
- Runners-up: Carnmore

The 1971 Galway Senior Hurling Championship was the 74th completed staging of the Galway Senior Hurling Championship since its establishment by the Galway County Board in 1887.

Liam Mellows entered the championship as the defending champions.

The final was played on 14 November 1971 at Pearse Stadium in Salthill, between Tommy Larkin's and Carnmore, in what was their first ever meeting in the final. Tommy Larkins won the match by 5–02 to 1–12 to claim their first ever championship title. It remains their only championship title.

== Results ==
=== Final ===
14 November 1971 Final	Tommy Larkin's	5-02 - 1-12	Carnmore	Pearse Stadium
