= Tynagh GAA =

Hurling club

Tynagh
- Tighneatha, Tíne
- Founded: 1886
- County: Galway
- Colours: Blue and Green, previously Blue and Gold
- Grounds: Tynagh

Senior Club Championships
	All Ireland	Connacht champions	Galway champions
Hurling:	0	0	5

Tynagh GAA was a hurling club located in Tynagh, County Galway, Ireland. It was a member of the Galway branch of the Gaelic Athletic Association (GAA). The club was solely concerned with the game of hurling.

== History ==
Located in the parish of Tynagh, on the Galway-Tipperary border, the Tynagh club was founded in the years immediately following the establishment of the GAA in 1884. The club contested the Galway SHC finals in 1889 and 1896, but lost out on both occasions. Between 1900 and 1906 there was no team in Tynagh but several players played with the neighbouring Duniry club.

Hurling eventually returned to the club, with Tynagh contesting every final between 1918 and 1928. The club won the title in 1920, 1922, 1923, 1925 and 1928, which was a technical five-in-a-row as the intervening finals were not held or the entire championship was cancelled. Tynagh went into a period of decline following this golden age. Galway SHC semi-finals were reached in the late 1940s, however, it was 1971 before the club enjoyed its next success when the Galway JHC titles was won. Players from the nearby Abbey/Duniry club joined Tynagh to form a senior and intermediate team in 1972 before once again operating as single entity clubs from 1976.

Tynagh won the Galway IHC title in 1987 to once again secure senior status. A decline in population resulted in Tynagh and Abbey/Duniry amalgamating at underage level in 1996. Both clubs amalgamated at adult level to create the new Tynagh-Abbey/Duniry club in 2004.

== Honours ==
- Galway Senior Hurling Championship (5): 1920, 1922, 1923, 1925, 1928
- Galway Intermediate Hurling Championship (1): 1987
- Galway Junior Hurling Championship (1): 1971

== Notable players ==
- Séamus Coen: All-Ireland SHC-winner (1980)
- Mick Dervan: All-Ireland SHC-winner (1923)
- Ignatius Harney: All-Ireland SHC-winner (1923)
- Mick Kenny: All-Ireland SHC-winner (1923)
- Jim Power : All-Ireland SHC-winner (1923)
