= 1964 Galway Senior Hurling Championship =

Annual hurling competition season

- Champions: Turloughmore (5th title)
- Runners-up: Ballinasloe

The 1964 Galway Senior Hurling Championship was the 67th completed staging of the Galway Senior Hurling Championship since its establishment by the Galway County Board in 1887.

Turloughmore entered the championship as the defending champions.

The final was played on 11 October 1964 at Pearse Stadium in Galway, between Turloughmore and Ballinasloe, in what was their first ever meeting in the final. Turloughmore won the match by 5–11 to 5–05 to claim their fifth championship title overall and a fourth consecutive title.

== Results ==
=== Final ===
11 October 1964 Final	Turloughmore	5-11 - 5-05	Ballinasloe	Pearse Stadium
