= 1993 Galway Senior Hurling Championship =

Annual hurling competition season

- Champions: Sarsfields (4th title); Pakie Cooney (captain)
- Runners-up: Carnmore; Murt Killilea (captain)

Tournament statistics
- Top scorer(s): Aidan Donohue (1–49)

The 1993 Galway Senior Hurling Championship was the 96th completed staging of the Galway Senior Hurling Championship since its establishment by the Galway County Board in 1887.

Sarsfields entered the championship as the defending champions.

The final was played on 14 November 1993 at Kenny Park in Athenry, between Sarsfields and Carnmore, in what was their second consecutive meeting in the final. Sarsfields won the match by 1–10 to 0–04 to claim their fourth championship title overall and a second consecutive title.

== Results ==
=== Final ===
14 November 1993 Final	Sarsfields	1-10 - 0-04	Carnmore	Kenny Park
