= Jim O'Regan (hurler) =

Irish hurler and Gaelic footballer

Personal information
- Native name: Séamus Ó Riagáin (Irish)
- Nickname: Jim O
- Born: 14 December 1901 Kinsale, County Cork, Ireland
- Died: October 1982 (aged 80) Kinsale, County Cork, Ireland
- Occupation: Garda / National school teacher

Sport
- Position: Centre-back
Clubs
- Years: Club
- Kinsale; De La Salle; Birr; Garda; Courcey Rovers; UCC; Éire Óg; Nils; Na Deasúnaigh
Inter-county
Years	County	Apps (scores)
1924 1925 1926–1935 1926–1935	Offaly (H); Dublin (H); Cork (H); Cork (F)	33 (0–1); 14 (7–3)
Inter-county titles
	Football	Hurling
Munster Titles	1	4
All-Ireland Titles	0	4
League titles	0	2

James O'Regan (14 December 1901 – October 1982) was an Irish hurler and Gaelic footballer who played as centre-back for the Cork and Dublin senior teams, as well as the Offaly junior team.

Born near Kinsale, County Cork, O'Regan first played competitive Gaelic games during his studies at the De La Salla College in Waterford. He arrived on the inter-county scene at the age of twenty-three when he first linked up with the Offaly junior team. He made his senior debut for Dublin during the 1925 championship before becoming a dual player with Cork's senior teams the following year. O'Regan immediately became a regular in the inter-county scene and won four All-Ireland medals, four Munster medals and two National Hurling League medals as well as a Munster football medal.

As a member of the Munster inter-provincial teams on a number of occasions, O'Regan won several Railway Cup medals as a dual player. At club level, he played with various club teams such as Kinsale, Garda and Courcey Rovers.

Throughout his career O'Regan made a combined total of 47 championship appearances for Cork. His retirement came following the conclusion of the 1935 championship.

In retirement from playing O'Regan became involved in team management and coaching. After serving as trainer with Courcey Rovers and St Vincent's, he trained the Cork senior hurlers to All-Ireland success in 1966.

O'Regan has been named as Center-Back on the Cork Hurling team of the Millennium/century.

== Playing career ==
=== Club ===
O’Regan initially played his club hurling with his local club in Kinsale. After moving to Dublin he joined the Garda club and won a Dublin Senior county title in the 1920s.

=== Inter-county ===
O’Regan first came to prominence on the inter-county scene with Cork in 1926. That year Cork won the inaugural National Hurling League competition, giving O'Regan his first major hurling title. Later that year Cork played Tipperary in the Munster final, but it took three games for the two sides to be separated. Cork won on the third occasion with O'Regan collecting his first Munster Senior Hurling Championship medal. The subsequent All-Ireland final pitted Cork against Kilkenny at a snow-covered Croke Park in October of that year. O'Regan's side took the lead at half-time and held on to win by 4–6 to 2–0. It was Cork's first championship title since 1919 and O'Regan's first All-Ireland Senior Hurling Championship medal.

Cork retained their Munster title in 1927, but O'Regan did not play any part in the provincial final. He returned to the team for the subsequent All-Ireland final against Dublin. Cork fell behind by 2–3 to 0–1 at half-time; however, they fought back in the second-half. In spite of this, Dublin won the game.

In 1928 Cork faced Clare in the Munster final. That game ended in a draw, but in the replay Cork triumphed with O'Regan collecting his second Munster title. Cork later defeated Dublin in the All-Ireland semi-final before lining out against Galway in the championship decider. Galway, who had received a bye into the final, were beaten on a scoreline of 6–12 to 1-0 and O'Regan won his second All-Ireland medal.

In 1929 Cork retained their provincial dominance for a fourth consecutive year. A 4–6 to 2–3 defeat of Waterford gave O'Regan his third Munster title in four years. The subsequent All-Ireland final was a replay of the previous year's game as Cork played Galway once again. Cork won the day by 4–9 to 1-3 giving O'Regan his third All-Ireland title.

O’Regan won a second National League title in 1930. However, Cork surrendered their provincial crown later that summer. The team bounced back in 1931 with O’Regan collecting a fourth Munster winners’ medal. Once again it took a replay for Cork and Waterford to be separated. The All-Ireland final saw Cork take on Kilkenny for the first time since 1926. After a close game both sides finished level – 1-6 apiece. The replay of the final took place four weeks later. Cork took the lead at half-time, but Kilkenny fought back. Once again both sides finished level – 2-5 apiece. The first week of November saw the second replay of the All-Ireland final take place. At the third attempt Cork triumphed by 5–8 to 3-4 giving O'Regan his fourth All-Ireland medal.

In 1932 Cork set out to defend the Munster and All-Ireland titles; however, Clare defeated O’Regan's side on that occasion. Cork went into decline following that defeat and failed to reach another Munster final until 1939. O’Regan retired from inter-county hurling in 1936.

=== Provincial ===
O’Regan also lined out with Munster in the inter-provincial hurling competition. He first played for his province in the inaugural year of the Railway Cup competition in 1927. Leinster were the victors on that occasion. O’Regan remained on the team and helped Munster to capture the next four titles in 1928, 1929, 1930 and 1931. He last lined out for Munster in 1933.

Achievements
Preceded by Seán Robbins	All-Ireland Minor Hurling Final referee 1935	Succeeded by Ignatius Harney
Preceded by Tommy Daly	All-Ireland Senior Hurling Final referee 1936	Succeeded by John Flaherty
