= Johnny Kelly (hurler) =

Irish hurling manager, coach and former player

Personal information
- Native name: Seán Ó Ceallaigh (Irish)
- Born: 1971 (age 54–55) Portumna, County Galway, Ireland
- Occupation: Facilities manager

Sport
- Sport: Hurling
- Position: Left wing-back
Club
- Years: Club
- Portumna
Club titles
- Galway titles: 2
- Connacht titles: 2
- All-Ireland Titles: 1

Johnny Kelly
Sport
Club management
- Years: Club
- 2005–2010 2013–2014 2015–2016 2015–2016 2017–2020: Portumna; Kiladangan; Coolderry; Abbeyknockmoy; Borris-Ileigh
Inter-county management
- Years: Team
- 2016–2017 2022–: Roscommon; Offaly

Johnny Kelly (born 1971) is an Irish hurling manager and former player who is the current manager of the Offaly senior hurling team. He previously managed a range of club sides, having played club hurling with Portumna.

== Playing career ==
Kelly played hurling while at secondary school at Portumna Community School. He captained the school's senior team to a Ryan Cup victory over St Raphael's College in 1989. Kelly's performances at school level earned a call-up to inter-county level with Galway and he was part of the minor team in 1989.

After lining out in the juvenile and underage ranks with the Portumna club, Kelly eventually progressed to adult level. He was part of the Portumna side that beat Kilconieron to win the Galway IHC title in 1992. Kelly's club career ended with All-Ireland Club SHC success as a member of the Portumna team's extended panel when they beat Newtownshandrum in the 2006 All-Ireland club final.

== Management career ==
Kelly's playing career with Portumna had just ended when he took over as team manager in 2007. His tenure in charge yielded consecutive All-Ireland Club SHC titles in 2008 and 2009, before being beaten by Ballyhale Shamrocks in a third consecutive final appearance in 2010.

A few seasons as manager of the NUI Galway team in the Fitzgibbon Cup was followed by a North Tipperary SHC title as coach of Kiladangan in 2013. A move to the Coolderry club in 2015 yielded an Offaly SHC title in the first of his two seasons in charge. Kelly simultaneously held the position of Abbeyknockmoy manager, securing county and provincial successes in 2015, before being beaten by Bennettsbridge in the 2016 All-Ireland Club IHC final.

Kelly made his first move into inter-county management during a concurrent three-year stint with Galway's intermediate and under-21 teams. He was a selector when Galway beat Cork to win the All-Ireland IHC title in 2015. Kelly later spent one season as manager of the Roscommon senior hurling team. He returned to club activity as Borris-Ileigh manager and guided the team to an All-Ireland Club SHC final appearance against Ballyhale Shamrocks in 2020.

Kelly returned to the inter-county scene in 2019 when he was named as one of Offaly senior hurling team manager Michael Fennelly's selectors. His three seasons in this role yielded National League Division 2A and 2021 Christy Ring Cup titles in 2021. Kelly succeeded Fennelly as Offaly manager in 2022. He guided the team to further Division 2A success in 2023 and a Joe McDonagh Cup title in 2024.

== Honours ==
=== Player ===
Portumna Community School

- Ryan Cup: 1989 (c)

Portumna

- All-Ireland Senior Club Hurling Championship: 2006
- Connacht Senior Club Hurling Championship: 2003, 2005
- Galway Senior Hurling Championship: 2003, 2005
- Galway Intermediate Hurling Championship: 1992

=== Management ===
Portumna

- All-Ireland Senior Club Hurling Championship: 2008, 2009
- Connacht Senior Club Hurling Championship: 2007
- Galway Senior Hurling Championship: 2007, 2008, 2009

Kiladangan

- North Tipperary Senior Hurling Championship: 2013

Coolderry

- Offaly Senior Hurling Championship: 2015

Abbeyknockmoy

- Connacht Intermediate Club Hurling Championship: 2015
- Galway Intermediate Hurling Championship: 2015

Borris-Ileigh

- Munster Senior Club Hurling Championship: 2019
- Tipperary Senior Hurling Championship: 2019

Galway

- All-Ireland Intermediate Hurling Championship: 2015

Offaly

- Joe McDonagh Cup: 2024
- Christy Ring Cup: 2021
- National Hurling League Division 2A: 2021, 2023
- Kehoe Cup: 2020

Sporting positions
Preceded by Justin Campbell	Rosocmmon senior hurling team manager 2016–2017	Succeeded by Ciarán Comerford
Preceded by Michael Fennelly	Offaly senior hurling team manager 2022–	Succeeded by Incumbent
Achievements
Preceded by Tom Mullally	Joe McDonagh Cup winning manager 2024	Succeeded by Brian Dowling
