= 1970 Galway Senior Hurling Championship =

Annual hurling competition season

- Champions: Liam Mellows (5th title)
- Runners-up: Killimordaly

The 1970 Galway Senior Hurling Championship was the 73rd completed staging of the Galway Senior Hurling Championship since its establishment by the Galway County Board in 1887.

Castlegar entered the championship as the defending champions.

The final was played on 20 September 1970 at Pearse Stadium in Salthill, between Liam Mellows and Killimordaly, in what was their first ever meeting in the final. Liam Mellows won the match by 5–11 to 1–11 to claim their fifth championship title overall and a first title in three years.

== Results ==
=== Final ===
20 September 1970 Final	Liam Mellows	5-11 - 1-11	Killimordaly	Pearse Stadium
