= 2002 Galway Senior Hurling Championship =

Annual hurling competition season

- Champions: Athenry (7th title); Brenda Keogh (captain); Pat Nally (manager)
- Runners-up: Sarsfields

The 2002 Galway Senior Hurling Championship was the 105th completed staging of the Galway Senior Hurling Championship since its establishment by the Galway County Board in 1887.

Clarinbridge entered the championship as the defending champions.

The final was played on 10 November 2002 at Pearse Stadium in Galway, between Athenry and Sarsfields, in what was their third meeting in the final overall. Athenry won the match by 1–16 to 2–07 to claim their seventh championship title overall and a first title in two years.

== Results ==
=== Final ===
10 November 2002 Final	Athenry	1-16 - 2-07	Sarsfields	Pearse Stadium
	E Cloonan 0-9 (6f), D Donohue 1-4, J Rabbitte 0-2, P Higgins 0-1.		J Cooney 1-5 (1-4f, 0-1 '65'), P McMahon 2-0, C Murray, P Forde 0-1 each.
