= Ignatius Harney =

Galway hurler

Personal information
- Native name: Eighneachán Ó hAthairne (Irish)
- Born: 16 February 1903 Tynagh, County Galway, Ireland
- Died: 1 September 1954 (aged 51) Tynagh, County Galway, Ireland

Sport
- Sport: Hurling
- Position: Forward
Club
- Years: Club
- Tynagh
Inter-county
- Years: County
- 1920–1934: Galway
Inter-county titles
- Connacht titles: 1
- All-Irelands: 1
- NHL: 1

James Ignatius Harney (16 February 1903 – 1 September 1954) was an Irish hurler who played for his local club Tynagh and at senior level for the Galway county team from 1920 until 1934.

== Playing career ==
=== Club ===
Harney played his club hurling with his local club in Tynagh. He won his first senior county title in 1920. Harney added further county medals to his collection in 1922, 1923, 1925 and 1928.

=== Inter-county ===
Harney first came to prominence on the inter-county scene with Galway in 1920. At the time Galway were unopposed in the Connacht Championship and had an easy passage to the All-Ireland semi-final every year. Harney's side lost to Dublin and Limerick respectively in the All-Ireland semi-finals of 1920 and 1921.

In 1922 the Connacht championship was revived for the first time since 1917. That year Harney collected a Connacht title as Galway defeated Roscommon in the provincial final. The men from the West were later defeated by Tipperary in the All-Ireland semi-final.

In 1923 Galway were unopposed n Connacht once again and went straight into the All-Ireland semi-final. Kilkenny, the All-Ireland champions of 1922, provided the opposition in that game, however, Galway emerged victorious by 5-4 to 2-0. For the first time since the inaugural championship in 1887 Galway had reached the All-Ireland final. Limerick, winners of the All-Ireland semi-final over Donegal, were the opponents, however, the team refused to play until all Civil War prisoners were released. Limerick were initially disqualified and the title awarded to Galway, however, the game eventually took place. Mick Gill’s tactic of dropping the sliothar into the square paid dividends as Galway won the game by 7-3 to 4-5. Not only was it Harney’s first All-Ireland title but it was also the first time that the county had won the championship.

In 1924 Galway defeated Tipp by a single point to set up an All-Ireland final meeting with Dublin. Mick Gill, who had played with the Galway team for the previous championship, was now a key member of the Dublin team. Galway took an early lead but ‘the Dubs’ got back on level terms when Garrett Howard drove the ball and the Galway goalkeeper into the net. Dublin also copied Galway's tactic of dropping the sliothar into the goalmouth, thus securing a 5-3 to 2-6 victory.

In 1925 Galway trounced Kilkenny by 9-4 to 6-0 in the All-Ireland semi-final to set up a championship decider with Tipperary. It was Galway's third All-Ireland final in-a-row, however, Tipp got off to a great start with two quick goals. Harney's side never recovered and lost the game by 5-6 to 1-5.

The next two seasons saw Galway face defeat in the All-Ireland semi-final, however, the team received special treatment in 1928. That year Galway got a bye into the All-Ireland final without even picking up a hurley. Cork were the opponents on that occasion and trounced Galway by 6-12 to 1-0. Both sides met again in the championship decider of 1929, however, Galway got off to a bad start. Mick Ahern scored a goal after just twenty-five seconds for Cork and another rout followed. Cork won by 4-9 to 1-3. This defeat brought Mahony's inter-county hurling career to an end.

This was Galway's last appearance in the All-Ireland final until 1953, however, there was one final victory left in the team. In the 1930-1931 National Hurling League Harney was appointed captain of the team. In the final of that competition Galway played Tipperary, the reigning All-Ireland champions. In a thrilling game Galway emerged victorious by 4-5 to 4-4. It was Harney's sole National League title.

After suffering a number of consecutive defeats in the All-Ireland semi-final, Harney retired from inter-county hurling in 1934.

Achievements
Preceded by Jim O'Regan	All-Ireland Minor Hurling Final referee 1936	Succeeded by Dan Ryan
Preceded by John Flaherty	All-Ireland Senior Hurling Final referee 1938	Succeeded by John Flaherty
