= 2003 Galway Senior Hurling Championship =

Annual hurling competition season

- Champions: Portumna (1st title); Ollie Canning (captain); Mike Monaghan (manager)
- Runners-up: Loughrea

The 2003 Galway Senior Hurling Championship was the 106th completed staging of the Galway Senior Hurling Championship since its establishment by the Galway County Board in 1887.

Athenry entered the championship as the defending champions.

The final was played on 26 October 2003 at Pearse Stadium in Galway, between Portumna and Loughrea, in what was their first ever meeting in the final. Portumna won the match by 2–13 to 2–09 to claim their first ever championship title.

== Results ==
=== Final ===
29 November 2003 Final	Portumna	2-13 - 2-09	Loughrea	Pearse Stadium
	F Canning 0-8 (8f), A Smith 1-3 (1f), K Hayes 1-1, D Canning 0-1.	Report	J O'Loughlin 0-8 (6f), K Colleran 2-0, J Maher 0-1.
