= 2001 Galway Senior Hurling Championship =

Annual hurling competition season

- Champions: Clarinbridge (1st title); Micheál Donoghue (captain); Billy McGrath (manager)
- Runners-up: Athenry

The 2001 Galway Senior Hurling Championship was the 104th completed staging of the Galway Senior Hurling Championship since its establishment by the Galway County Board in 1887.

Athenry entered the championship as the defending champions.

The final was played on 21 October 2001 at Duggan Park, Ballinasloe in Galway, between Clarinbridge and Athenry, in what was their first ever meeting in the final. Clarinbridge won the match by 0–18 to 2–11 to claim their first ever championship title.

== Results ==
=== Final ===
21 October 2001 Final	Clarinbridge	0-18 - 2-11	Athenry	Pearse Stadium
	D Coen 0-8 (7f), M Kerins 0-4, A Kerins 0-2, D Donoghue 0-2, P Coen and C Coen 0-1 each.		E Cloonan 0-8 (7f), J Rabbitte 1-1, D Moran 1-0, S Donoghue and D Donohue 0-1 each.
