= 2006 Galway Senior Hurling Championship =

Annual hurling competition season

- Champions: Loughrea (2nd title); Damien McClearn (captain); Pat O'Connor (manager)
- Runners-up: Portumna

The 2006 Galway Senior Hurling Championship was the 109th completed staging of the Galway Senior Hurling Championship since its establishment by the Galway County Board in 1887.

Portumna entered the championship as the defending champions.

The final was played on 22 October 2006 at Pearse Stadium in Galway, between Loughrea and Portumna, in what was their third meeting in the final overall. Loughrea won the match by 1–13 to 0–15 to claim their second championship title overall and a first title in 65 years.

== Results ==
=== Final ===
22 October 2006 Final	Loughrea	1-13 - 0-15	Portumna	Pearse Stadium
	J Maher 0-7f, E Coen 1-1, J O'Loughlin 0-3 (1f), B Mahony, K Colleran 0-1 each.		J Canning 0-7 (6f, 1 '65), K Hayes 0-3, D Canning, A Smith (f), D Hayes, N Hayes, M Ryan 0-1
