= 1961 Galway Senior Hurling Championship =

Annual hurling competition season

- Champions: Turloughmore (2nd title)
- Runners-up: Fohenagh

The 1961 Galway Senior Hurling Championship was the 64th completed staging of the Galway Senior Hurling Championship since its establishment by the Galway County Board in 1887.

Fohenagh entered the championship as the defending champions.

The final was played on 8 October 1961 at Kenny Park in Athenry, between Turloughmore and Fohenagh, in what was their first ever meeting in the final. Turloughmore won the match by 3–06 to 3–04 to claim their second championship title overall and a first title in five years.

== Results ==
=== Final ===
8 October 1961 Final	Turloughmore	3-06 - 3-04	Fohenagh	Kenny Park
