= Tommy Larkin's GAA =

Gaelic games club in County Galway, Ireland

Tommy Larkin's Gaelic Athletic Club
- Tomás Ó Lorcáin
- Founded: 1968
- County: Galway
- Nickname: Tommies
- Colours: Red and Black

Playing kits
Standard colours

Tommy Larkin's Gaelic Athletic Club is a hurling club based in the parishes of Ballinakill/Derrybrien and Woodford areas of County Galway, Ireland. It is a member of the Galway GAA branch of the Gaelic Athletic Association. It competes in the Galway Senior Hurling Championship.

== Name ==
The club is named after two local men, both named Thomas Larkin, who played separate roles in local history.

The first man, Tom Larkin of Gurteeny, Woodford, died in 1887. In 1886, during a week-long eviction at a premise known as Saunder's Fort in Woodford, Tom Larkin stood up to an RIC constable who was roughly treating a young girl and struck him. Larkin was subsequently arrested and imprisoned in the overcrowded Kilkenny Gaol where he died of reported neglect in 1887 aged 23.

The second man, Fr. Tom Larkin of Ballinakill, is known locally for promoting hurling in Ballinakill and in all East Galway when he was chairman. Fr. Larkin played a role in GAA affairs in County Galway in the 1920s and 1930s and he coached the Tynagh teams which won ten County Galway senior championships and supplied a number of players to the Galway team which won the All-Ireland of 1923. He was also the founder of the Ballinakill Céilí Band. He died in 1949.

== History ==
Tommy Larkin's Gaelic Athletic Club was founded in 1968 with the amalgamation of the Woodford and Ballinakill GAA clubs.

Soon after amalgamation, adult hurling flourished with the senior team winning the county title in 1971. However, the club struggled to compete in the late 1970s and 1980s due in the most part to emigration.

In 1990, the club was relegated to the intermediate ranks. This prompted a renewed focus to coaching at underage level. Since the 1990s, the club has won several county titles at underage level, including two Féile titles.

On 1 November 2026, Tommy Larkin's played in their first Galway Senior Hurling Championship final since 1971, losing by 0-17 to 0-16 Loughrea in the 2026 final.

== Crest ==
The club's current crest, designed in 2004 based on an earlier crest, includes the "T" and "L" in Celtic monogram lettering (representing the club name "Tommy Larkins") as well as a hurley, sliotar and football (representing the Gaelic games played at the club).

== Notable people ==
- Cyril Farrell, three-time All-Ireland Senior Hurling Championship winning manager (including back-to-back titles in 1987 and 1988 with Galway)
- Jason Flynn, All-Ireland Senior Hurling Championship winner with Galway in 2017
- Éanna Murphy, inter-county hurler with Galway

== Honours ==
- Connacht Senior Club Hurling Championship (1): 1971
- Galway Senior Hurling Championship (1): 1971
- Connacht Intermediate Club Hurling Championship (2): 2005, 2007
