= Abbeyknockmoy GAA =

Gaelic sports club in County Galway, Ireland

Abbeyknockmoy
- Mainistir Cnoc Maigh
- Founded: 1953
- County: Galway
- Colours: Blue and red
- Grounds: Abbeyknockmoy

Playing kits
Standard colours

Senior Club Championships
	All Ireland	Connacht champions	Galway champions
Hurling:	3	4	6

Abbeyknockmoy GAA is a Gaelic Athletic Association club located in Abbeyknockmoy, County Galway, Ireland and is almost exclusively concerned with the game of hurling.

== History ==
The club was founded in 1953. A junior team was affiliated in 1954. In the sane year, the team won its first title and were crowned North Board Junior champions. In the intervening years, the club won a total of 26 titles with senior status attained for the second time in 1985 when they won the Intermediate championship. This was followed in 1988 when they won the first county senior title. In 2011 the club won the county minor B1 championship. In 2015 they defeated Moycullen to land the County Intermediate title on a scoreline of 1-16 to 0-13 and defeated Four Roads in the Connacht Final 1-11 to 0-11.

== Honours ==
1955:

- North Galway Junior Hurling Championship
- North Galway Intermediate Hurling Championship

1956:

- North Galway Intermediate Hurling Championship

1957:

- North Galway Intermediate Hurling League

1959:

- North Galway Junior Hurling League

1960:

- North Galway Junior Hurling Championship

1961:

- North Galway Intermediate Hurling Championship

1962

- North Galway Intermediate Hurling Championship

1964

- North Galway Juvenile Hurling Championship
- Galway Juvenile Hurling Championship

1967:

- North Galway Junior Hurling League

1968:

- North Galway Junior Hurling Championship
- Galway Junior Hurling Championship

1969:

- Galway Camogie Championship

1971:

- Galway Intermediate Hurling Championship Winners

1974:

- North Galway Minor Hurling Championship

1977:

- County Junior Hurling Championship

1985:

- Galway Intermediate Hurling Championship Winners

1988:

- Galway Senior Hurling Championship

2001:

- Junior B Hurling Championship

2011:

- Galway Minor B1 Hurling Championship

2015:

- Galway Intermediate Hurling Championship Winners
- Connacht Intermediate Club Hurling Championship Winners

2016:

- All-Ireland Intermediate Club Hurling Championship Finalists
