= Meelick–Eyrecourt GAA =

Gaelic sports club in County Galway, Ireland

Meelick–Eyrecourt
- Mílic–Dún an Uchta
- Founded: 1884
- County: Galway
- Colours: Blue and White
- Grounds: Ballynakill, Eyrecourt, County Galway
- Coordinates: 53°12′42″N 8°05′30″W

Playing kits
Standard colours

Senior Club Championships
	All Ireland	Connacht champions	Galway champions
Hurling:	-	-	1

Meelick–Eyrecourt is a Gaelic Athletic Association (GAA) club in the east of County Galway, Ireland. It is primarily involved in hurling, and has won a number of hurling county titles at intermediate and senior grade.

== History ==
Meelick–Eyrecourt GAA club was founded in Meelick in the 1880s, and contested the first All-Ireland Hurling Final in 1887. It borders with Killimor, Portumna and Kiltormer GAA clubs in Galway and St Rynagh's in Banagher, County Offaly.

The present club has players from the largely rural areas of Clonfert and Meelick, and the small village of Eyrecourt. These three areas make up the local Roman Catholic parish of Eyrecourt, Clonfert and Meelick, which is a small parish located on the south corner of the Diocese of Clonfert.

Meelick and Clonfert originally formed separate hurling teams. The Meelick club was founded in 1884. The existing club is sometimes cited as being one of the oldest GAA clubs in Ireland.

Meelick competed in the first All Ireland Hurling final of 1887 after defeating Kilbeacanty in the Galway County Cup. The club played opponents Thurles of Tipperary. Thurles defeated Meelick 1-1 to 0-0.

While primarily focused on hurling, the club contested two Junior Gaelic football county finals in the 1960s.

A book on the history of the club, titled A History of the GAA in Meelick, Eyrecourt and Clonfert, 1884-2007, written by Christy Kearns, was published in 2007.

The club last contested a senior hurling county final in 1980, which it lost. The club, which has fluctuated between senior hurling and intermediate grades since the late-1990s, won the Galway Intermediate Hurling Championship title in 2025.

== Honours ==
The club has won a number of county titles, including:

- Galway Senior Hurling Championship (1): 1887
- Galway Intermediate Hurling Championship (4): 1959 (as Eyrecourt), 1973, 1997, 2025
