= Craughwell GAA =

Gaelic sports club in County Galway, Ireland

Craughwell
- Creachmhaoil
- Founded: 1885
- County: Galway
- Colours: Green and gold
- Grounds: Craughwell

Playing kits
Standard colours

Senior Club Championships
	All Ireland	Connacht champions	Galway champions
Hurling:	0	0	4

Craughwell GAA is a Gaelic Athletic Association club located in Craughwell, County Galway, Ireland. The club was founded in 1885 and is exclusively concerned with the game of hurling.

== Honours ==
- Galway Senior Hurling Championship (4): 1909, 1915, 1918, 1930 (runners-up in 2015)
- Galway Minor Hurling Championship: (3) 1968, 2001, 2002

== Notable players ==
- Thomas Monaghan
- Gerard O'Halloran
- Niall Healy
- Fergal Healy
