= Galway Senior Hurling Championship =

Annual hurling competition

- Current season or competition: 2026 Galway Senior Hurling Championship
- Code: Hurling
- Founded: 1887; 139 years ago
- Region: Galway (GAA)
- Trophy: Tom Callinan Cup
- No. of teams: 16
- Title holders: Loughrea (5th title)
- Most titles: Castlegar (17 titles)
- Sponsors: Brooks
- TV partner(s): TG4, RTÉ2
- Official website: Official website

The Galway Senior Hurling Championship (known for sponsorship reasons as the Brooks Galway Senior Hurling Championship) is an annual hurling competition organised by the Galway County Board of the Gaelic Athletic Association since 1887 for the top hurling teams in the county of Galway in Ireland.

The series of games are played during the summer and autumn months with the county final currently being played at Pearse Stadium in November. Initially played as a knock-out competition, the championship currently consists of a group stage followed by a knock-out series of games.

The Galway County Championship is an integral part of the wider All-Ireland Senior Club Hurling Championship. The winners of the Galway county final automatically represent Connacht and join the champions of the other three provinces to contest the All-Ireland Championship.

Sixteen teams currently participate in the Galway County Championship. The title has been won at least once by 29 different teams. The all-time record-holders are Castlegar, who have won a total of 17 titles.

Loughrea are the current title-holders, defeating Tommy Larkin's by 0-17 to 0-16 in the 2026 final to win their third consecutive Galway County Championship and fourth in total, having previously won the title in 1941, 2006, 2024 and 2025.

== History ==
=== Beginnings ===
Following the foundation of the Gaelic Athletic Association in 1884, new rules for Gaelic football and hurling were drawn up and published in the United Irishman newspaper. In 1886, county committees were established, with the Galway County Board affiliating on 26 October 1886. The inaugural championship was played during the summer of 1887. Delays and objections were commonplace in the early years, with a number of championships remaining unfinished.

== Format ==
=== Senior A ===
==== Group stage ====
The 16 clubs are divided into four groups of four. Over the course of the group stage, each team plays once against the others in the group, resulting in each team being guaranteed three group games. Two points are awarded for a win, one for a draw and zero for a loss. The teams are ranked in the group stage table by points gained, then scoring difference and then their head-to-head record. The top team in each group qualify for the quarter-finals and the second and third placed teams in the group qualifying for the preliminary quarter-finals.

==== Knockout stage ====
Following the completion of the group stage, the top three teams from each group qualify to the knockout stage with the four group winners receiving byes to separate quarter-finals.

Preliminary quarter-finals: Teams that finished second and third in the group stage contest this round. Repeat pairings are avoided. The four winners from these games advance to the quarter-finals.

Quarter-finals: The four group winners and the four preliminary quarter-final winners contest this round. Repeat pairings are avoided. The two winners from these two games advance to the semi-finals.

Semi-finals: The four quarter-final winners contest this round. The two winners from these two games advance to the final.

Final: The two semi-final winners contest the final. The winning team are declared champions.

==== Relegation ====
The four bottom-placed teams from the group stage take part in a series of play-offs, with the losing team being relegated to the Galway Intermediate Hurling Championship.

==== Qualification ====
At the end of the championship, the winning team qualify to the subsequent All-Ireland Senior Club Hurling Championship.

== Teams ==
=== 2026 Senior A Teams ===
Team	Location	Championship titles	Last championship title
Ardrahan	Ardrahan	11	1978
Athenry	Athenry	8	2004
Cappataggle	Cappataggle	0	—
Castlegar	Castlegar	17	1984
Clarinbridge	Clarinbridge	2	2010
Craughwell	Craughwell	4	1930
Gort	Gort	7	2014
Killimordaly	Killimordaly	1	1986
Liam Mellows	Renmore	9	2017
Loughrea	Loughrea	4	2025
Moycullen	Moycullen	0	—
Oranmore-Maree	Oranmore	1	1933
Sarsfields	Bullaun, New Inn and Woodlawn	7	2015
St Thomas'	Kilchreest and Peterswell	7	2023
Tommy Larkin's	Woodford	1	1971
Turloughmore	Turloughmore	8	1985

== Venues ==
=== Early rounds ===
Pearse Stadium in Salthill

Fixtures in the opening rounds of the championship are usually played at a neutral venue that is deemed halfway between the participating teams. Some of the more common venues include Kenny Park, Duggan Park and St Brendan's Park.

=== Final ===
The final has regularly been played at Pearse Stadium in Salthill.

== Managers ==
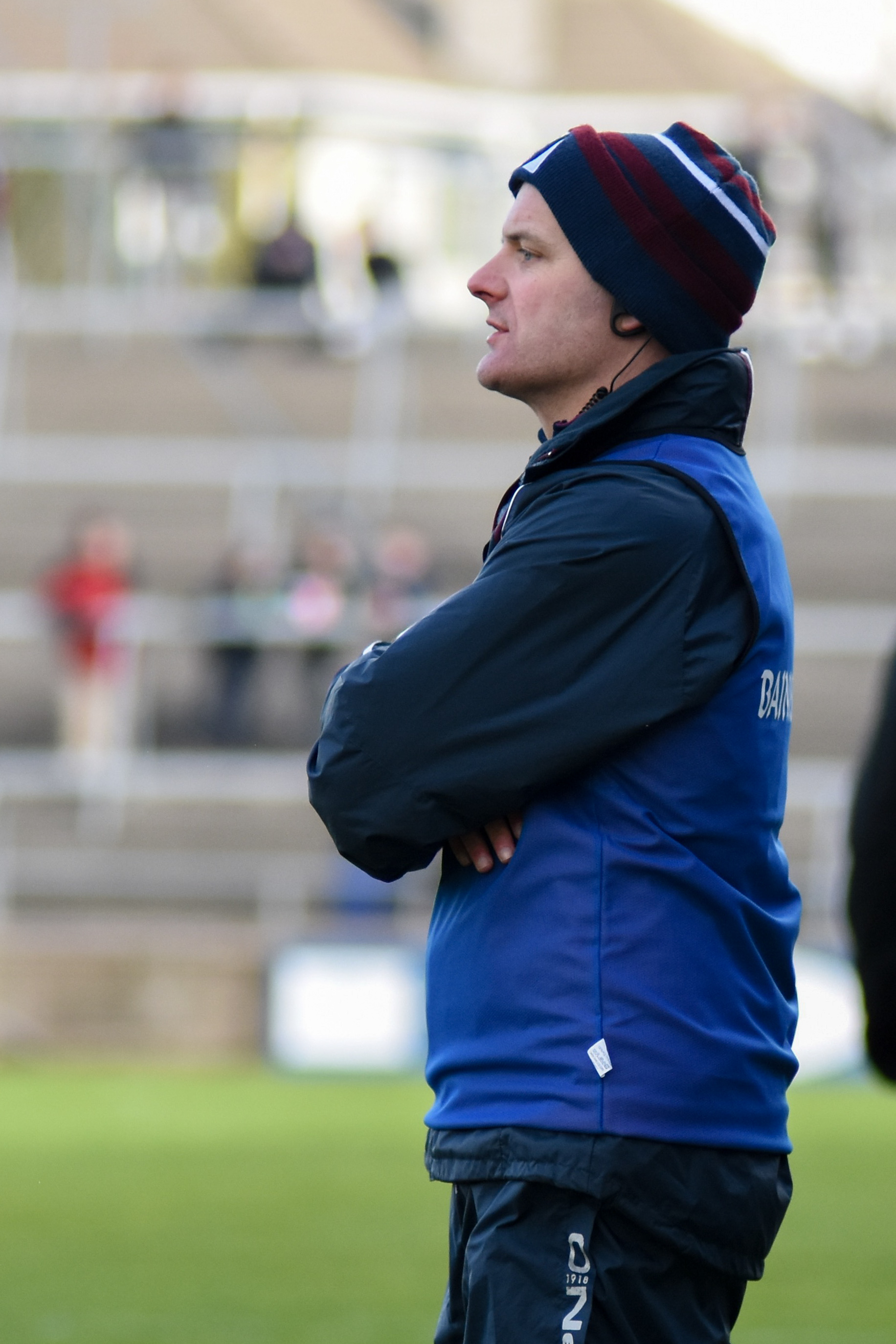
Micheál Donoghue managed Clarinbridge to the 2010 championship.

Managers in the Galway Championship are involved in the day-to-day running of the team, including the training, team selection, and sourcing of players. Their influence varies from club-to-club and is related to the individual club committees. The manager is assisted by a team of two or three selectors and a backroom team consisting of various coaches.

Winning managers (1998–present)
Manager	Team	Wins	Winning years
Pat Nally	Athenry	4	1998, 1999, 2000, 2002
Kevin Lally	St. Thomas'	3	2018, 2019, 2020
Kenneth Burke	St. Thomas'	3	2021, 2022, 2023
Johnny Kelly	Portumna	2	2008, 2009
John Burke	St. Thomas'	2	2012, 2016
Tommy Kelly	Loughrea	2	2024, 2025
Billy McGrath	Clarinbridge	1	2001
Mike Monaghan	Portumna	1	2003
Billy Caulfield	Athenry	1	2004
Pat O'Connor	Loughrea	1	2006
Micheál Donoghue	Clarinbridge	1	2010
Mattie Murphy	Gort	1	2011
Frank Canning	Portumna	1	2013
Gerry Spelman	Gort	1	2014
Cathal Murray	Sarsfields	1	2015
Louis Mulqueen	Liam Mellows	1	2017

== Roll of honour ==
#	Club	Wins	Runners-up	Years won	Years runners-up
1	Castlegar	17	9	1936, 1937, 1938, 1939, 1940, 1944, 1950, 1952, 1953, 1957, 1958, 1967, 1969, 1972, 1973, 1979, 1984	1912, 1933, 1959, 1960, 1962, 1974, 1982, 1983, 1987
2	Ardrahan	11	7	1894, 1895, 1896, 1901, 1902, 1903, 1910, 1949, 1974, 1975, 1978	1897, 1898, 1923, 1956, 1968, 1969
3	Liam Mellows	9	3	1935, 1943, 1945, 1946, 1954, 1955, 1968, 1970, 2017	1957, 2018, 2019
4	Turloughmore	8	6	1956, 1961, 1962, 1963, 1964, 1965, 1966, 1985	1893, 1972, 1986, 1990, 2020, 2023
4	Athenry	8	5	1987, 1994, 1996, 1998, 1999, 2000, 2002, 2004	1977, 1988, 1989, 1991, 2001
4	St. Thomas'	8	1	2012, 2016, 2018, 2019, 2020, 2021, 2022, 2023	2025
7	Gort	7	6	1914, 1916, 1934, 1981, 1983, 2011, 2014	1915, 1917, 1936, 1950, 2008, 2016, 2017
7	Sarsfields	7	3	1980, 1989, 1992, 1993, 1995, 1997, 2015	1994, 2000, 2002
7	Peterswell	7	2	1889, 1898, 1899, 1900, 1904, 1905, 1907	1902, 1928
10	Portumna	6	4	2003, 2005, 2007, 2008, 2009, 2013	1995, 2004, 2006, 2014
11	Tynagh	5	9	1920, 1922, 1923, 1925, 1928	1889, 1896, 1906, 1907, 1918, 1919, 1934, 1998, 1999
11	Loughrea	5	10	1941, 2006, 2024, 2025, 2026	1909, 1949, 1951, 2003, 2005, 2009, 2010, 2012, 2013, 2022
11	Kiltormer	5	1	1976, 1977, 1982, 1990, 1991	1981
14	Craughwell	4	7	1909, 1915, 1918, 1930	1892, 1899, 1900, 1905, 1925, 1932, 2015
15	Kilconieron	3	5	1908, 1912, 1919	1910, 1913, 1916, 1920
15	Mullagh	3	2	1906, 1929, 1932	1904, 1966
17	Clarinbridge	2	5	2001, 2010	1929, 1939, 1997, 2011, 2021
17	Army	2	4	1947, 1948	1941, 1945, 1946, 1955
17	Fohenagh	2	3	1959, 1960	1958, 1961, 1963
17	College Road	2	1	1892, 1893	1894
17	Woodford	2	1	1913, 1917	1914
22	Ballinasloe	1	5	1951	1943, 1953, 1954, 1964, 1973
22	Killimordaly	1	5	1986	1965, 1970, 1976, 1984, 1985
22	Maree	1	3	1933	1938, 1940, 1967
22	Killimor	1	2	1897	1937, 1944
22	Meelick	1	0	1887	—
22	Derrydonnell	1	0	1911	—
22	Tommy Larkins	1	1	1971	2026
22	Abbeyknockmoy	1	0	1988	—
30	Carnmore	0	6	—	1947, 1971, 1975, 1992, 1993, 1996
30	Claregalway	0	3	—	1895, 1901, 1911
30	Ballinderreen	0	2	—	1935, 1978
30	Kinvara	0	2	—	1979, 2007
30	Galway City 98s	0	1	—	1903
30	Kileenadeema	0	1	—	1908
30	Galway City	0	1	—	1922
30	Leitrim	0	1	—	1930
30	St. Coleman's	0	1	—	1948
30	Meelick-Eyrecourt	0	1	—	1980
30	Cappataggle	0	1	—	2024

== List of finals ==
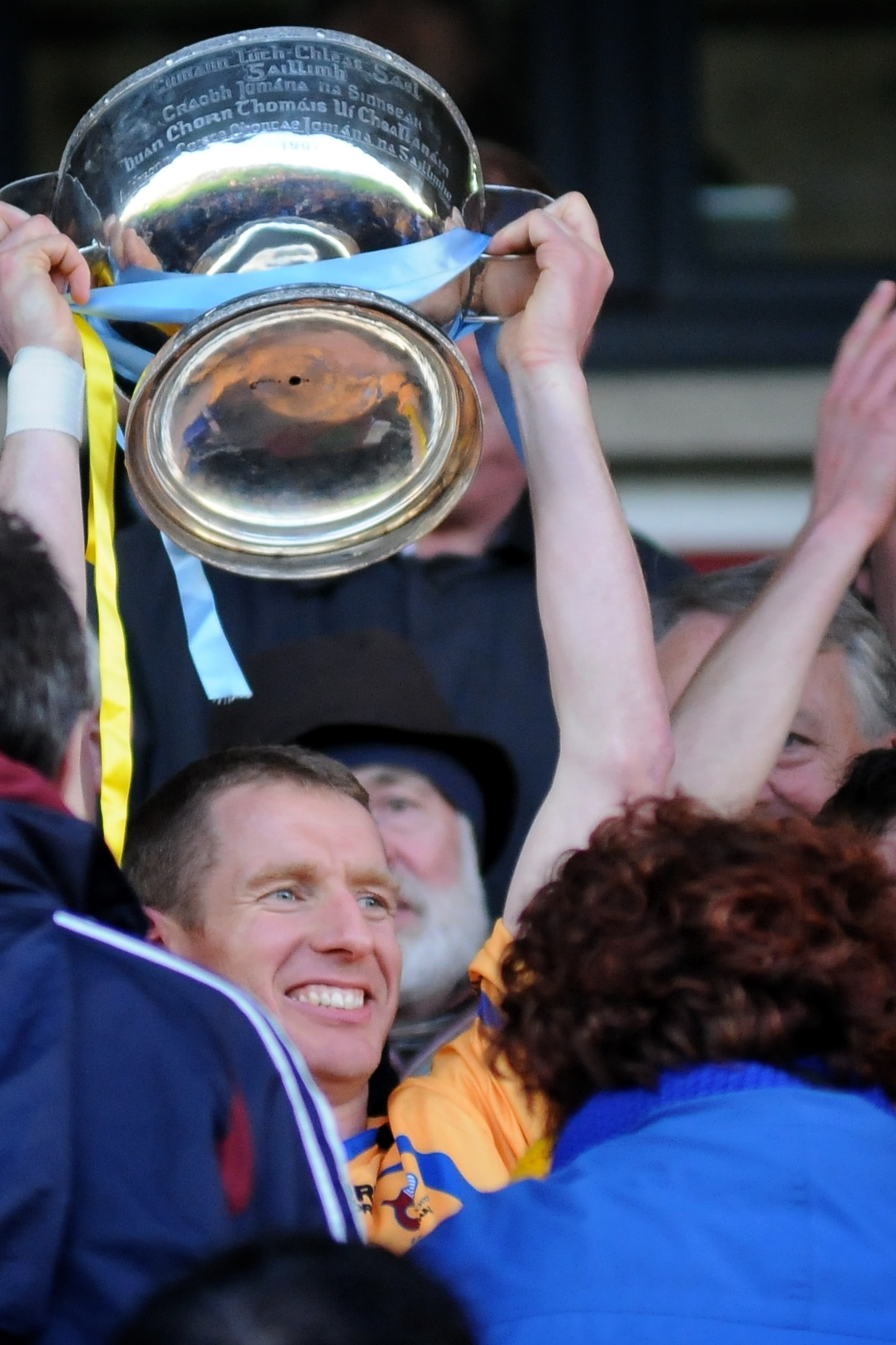
Ollie Canning of Portumna accepting the 2013 Galway Senior Hurling Championship trophy at Pearse Stadium in Galway

=== Legend ===
- Gold – All-Ireland senior club champions
- Silver – All-Ireland senior club runners-up

=== List of Galway SHC finals ===
Year	Winners		Runners-up	
Year	Club	Score	Club	Score
2026	Loughrea	0-17	Tommy Larkin's	0-16
2025	Loughrea	1-15	St. Thomas'	1-14
2024	Loughrea	1-15	Cappataggle	0-16
2023	St. Thomas'	2-12	Turloughmore	1-13
2022	St. Thomas'	1-17, 1-15 (R)	Loughrea	0-20, 0-17 (R)
2021	St. Thomas'	0-20	Clarinbridge	0-17
2020	St. Thomas'	1-14	Turloughmore	0-15
2019	St. Thomas'	1-13	Liam Mellows	0-14
2018	St. Thomas'	2-13	Liam Mellows	0-10
2017	Liam Mellows	3-12	Gort	1-15
2016	St. Thomas'	1-11	Gort	0-10
2015	Sarsfields	0-12, 2-10 (R)	Craughwell	0-12, 0-14 (R)
2014	Gort	2-13	Portumna	1-10
2013	Portumna	3-12	Loughrea	0-14
2012	St. Thomas'	3-11	Loughrea	2-11
2011	Gort	0-17	Clarinbridge	1-12
2010	Clarinbridge	2-11, 0-18 (R, AET)	Loughrea	1-14, 0-15 (R, AET)
2009	Portumna	5-19	Loughrea	1-13
2008	Portumna	1-18	Gort	2-07
2007	Portumna	6-12	Kinvara	0-11
2006	Loughrea	1-13	Portumna	0-15
2005	Portumna	3-21	Loughrea	3-14
2004	Athenry	0-15	Portumna	0-13
2003	Portumna	2-13	Loughrea	2-09
2002	Athenry	1-16	Sarsfields	3-07
2001	Clarinbridge	0-18	Athenry	2-11
2000	Athenry	2-14	Sarsfields	3-07
1999	Athenry	1-16	Tynagh	1-10
1998	Athenry	0-09, 1-15 (R)	Tynagh	0-09, 1-12 (R)
1997	Sarsfields	1-11	Clarinbridge	1-06
1996	Athenry	2-06	Carnmore	1-06
1995	Sarsfields	0-17	Portumna	1-09
1994	Athenry	2-06	Sarsfields	0-09
1993	Sarsfields	1-10	Carnmore	0-04
1992	Sarsfields	0-14, 1-14 (R)	Carnmore	1-11, 1-05 (R)
1991	Kiltormer	3-09	Athenry	0-15
1990	Kiltormer	0-18	Turloughmore	2-07
1989	Sarsfields	3-07	Athenry	1-08
1988	Abbeyknockmoy	2-08, 2-06 (R)	Athenry	2-08, 0-11 (R)
1987	Athenry	1-12	Castlegar	2-06
1986	Killimordaly	0-17	Turloughmore	2-07
1985	Turloughmore	1-14	Killimordaly	1-04
1984	Castlegar	3-10	Killimordaly	0-11
1983	Gort	2-12	Castlegar	3-06
1982	Kiltormer	2-08	Castlegar	1-09
1981	Gort	2-08, 2-06 (R)	Kiltormer	1-11, 0-08 (R)
1980	Sarsfields	0-11	Meelick-Eyrecourt	0-09
1979	Castlegar	2-13	Kinvara	0-06
1978	Ardrahan	2-10, 2-18 (R, AET)	Ballinderreen	0-16, 2-14 (R, AET)
1977	Kiltormer	3-10	Athenry	3-08
1976	Kiltormer	1-09	Killimordaly	1-06
1975	Ardrahan	4-05	Carnmore	1-11
1974	Ardrahan	2-10	Castlegar	1-10
1973	Castlegar	3-10, 4-11 (R)	Ballinasloe	2-13, 3-10 (R)
1972	Castlegar	5-05	Turloughmore	0-08
1971	Tommy Larkin's	5-02	Carnmore	1-12
1970	Liam Mellows	5-11	Killimordaly	1-11
1969	Castlegar	4-14	Ardrahan	2-06
1968	Liam Mellows	3-11	Ardrahan	2-12
1967	Castlegar	3-09	Maree	4-04
1966	Turloughmore	4-08	Mullagh	2-08
1965	Turloughmore	7-04	Killimordaly	4-11
1964	Turloughmore	5-11	Ballinasloe	5-05
1963	Turloughmore	5-13	Fohenagh	2-04
1962	Turloughmore	2-09, 7-10 (R)	Castlegar	2-09, 0-09 (R)
1961	Turloughmore	3-06	Fohenagh	3-04
1960	Fohenagh	4-09	Castlegar	2-07
1959	Fohenagh	2-08, 3-09 (R)	Castlegar	1-11, 4-05 (R)
1958	Castlegar	5-09	Fohenagh	2-04
1957	Castlegar	6-11	Liam Mellows	2-03
1956*	Turloughmore	0-09	Ardrahan	2-03
1955	Liam Mellows	3-04	Army	2-05
1954	Liam Mellows	5-04	Ballinasloe	2-03
1953	Castlegar	3-02	Ballinasloe	1-05
1952	Castlegar	2-08	Ardrahan	3-03
1951	Ballinasloe	4-07	Loughrea	2-05
1950	Castlegar	9-03	Gort	0-02
1949	Ardrahan	1-09	Loughrea	2-02
1948	Army	7-07	St. Coleman's	6-02
1947	Army	4-13	Carnmore	3-03
1946	Liam Mellows	6-06	Army	1-11
1945	Liam Mellows	7-02	Army	2-03
1944	Castlegar	8-06	Killimor	5-06
1943	Liam Mellows	3-04	Ballinasloe	2-05
1942	Declared void (Liam Mellows had defeated Ardrahan by 8-04 to 0-08 and then 5-04 to 0-07)			
1941	Loughrea	5-03	Army	2-01
1940	Castlegar	9-06	Maree	2-03
1939	Castlegar	9-01	Clarinbridge	8-02
1938	Castlegar	2-07	Maree	2-02
1937	Castlegar	9-13	Killimor	1-01
1936	Castlegar	6-06	Gort	2-05
1935	Liam Mellows	5-00	Ballinderreen	2-02
1934	Gort	4-04	Tynagh	3-01
1933	Maree	5-06	Castlegar	6-02
1932	Mullagh	5-03	Craughwell	3-02
1931	No final			
1930	Craughwell	7-04	Leitrim	1-05
1929	Mullagh	9-03	Clarinbridge	1-02
1928	Tynagh	10-00	Peterswell	2-03
1927	No final			
1926	No final			
1925	Tynagh	7-03	Craughwell	3-01
1924	No game completed (Ardrahan and Tynagh in the final)			
1923	Tynagh	6-02	Ardrahan	2-00
1922	Tynagh		Galway City	
1921	No game completed (Kilconieron and Tynagh in the final)			
1920	Tynagh		Kilconieron	
1919	Kilconieron	3-14	Tynagh	0-12
1918	Craughwell	1-04	Tynagh	0-04
1917	Woodford		Gort	
1916	Gort	4-02	Kilconieron	2-03
1915	Craughwell	5-05	Gort	1-01
1914	Gort	0-27	Woodford	0-18
1913	Woodford	2-05	Kilconieron	3-01
1912	Kilconieron	5-03	Castlegar	0-01
1911	Derrydonnell (Athenry)	3-01	Claregalway	1-00
1910	Ardrahan	1-03	Kilconieron	0-01
1909	Craughwell	Awarded	Loughrea	No Final
1908	Kilconieron	0-17	Kileenadeema	0-02
1907	Peterswell		Tynagh	
1906	Mullagh	2-05, 1-04 (R)	Tynagh	2-05, 1-03 (R)
1905	Peterswell	1-08	Craughwell	0-07
1904	Peterswell	2-03	Mullagh	0-05
1903	Ardrahan	0-01 Awarded	Galway City 98's	0-02
1902	Ardrahan		Peterswell no. 2	
1901	Ardrahan		Claregalway	
1900	Peterswell	4-08	Craughwell	4-03
1899	Peterswell	1899/1900 single season	Craughwell	1899/1900 single season
1898	Peterswell		Ardrahan	
1897	Killimor	2-04	Ardrahan	0-00
1896	Ardrahan		Tynagh	
1895	Ardrahan	1-01, 1-02 (R)	Claregalway	0-03, 0-00 (R)
1894	Ardrahan		College Road	
1893	College Road		Turloughmore	
1892	College Road		Craughwell	
1891	No championship			
1890	No championship			
1889	Peterswell		Tynagh	
1888	No championship			
1887	Meelick			

- 1956 Awarded to Turloughmore

== Records and statistics ==
=== Teams ===
==== By decade ====
The most successful team of each decade, judged by number of Galway Senior Hurling Championship titles, is as follows:

- 1880s: 1 each for Meelick (1887) and Peterswell (1889)
- 1890s: 3 for Ardrahan (1894-95-96)
- 1900s: 4 for Peterswell (1900-04-05-07)
- 1910s: 2 each for Kilconieron (1912–19), Woodfield (1913–17), Gort (1914–16) and Craughwell (1915–18)
- 1920s: 5 for Tyangh (1920-22-23-25-28)
- 1930s: 4 for Castlegar (1936-37-38-39)
- 1940s: 3 for Liam Mellows (1943-45-46)
- 1950s: 5 for Castlegar (1950-52-53-57-58)
- 1960s: 6 for Turloughmore (1961-62-63-64-65-66)
- 1970s: 3 each for Castlegar (1972-73-79) and Ardrahan (1974-75-78)
- 1980s: 2 each for Sarsfields (1980–89) and Gort (1981–83)
- 1990s: 4 each for Sarsfields (1992-93-95-97) and Athenry (1994-96-98-99)
- 2000s: 5 for Portumna (2003-05-07-08-09)
- 2010s: 4 for St. Thomas' (2012-16-18-19)
- 2020s: 4 for St. Thomas' (2020-21-22-23)

==== Gaps ====
Top five longest gaps between successive championship titles:

- 65 years: Loughrea (1941-2006)
- 47 years: Liam Mellows (1970-2017)
- 47 years: Gort (1934-1981)
- 39 years: Ardrahan (1910-1949)
- 28 years: Gort (1983-2011)

== See also ==
- Galway Intermediate Hurling Championship (Tier 2)
- Galway Junior A Hurling Championship (Tier 3)
