= Carnmore GAA =

Gaelic sports club in County Galway, Ireland

- Founded: 1944
- County: Galway
- Colours: Red and White
- Grounds: Carnmore GAA Pitch

Playing kits
Standard colours

Senior Club Championships
	All Ireland	Connacht champions	Galway champions
Hurling:	0	0	0

Carnmore GAA is a Gaelic Athletic Association club located in the village of Carnmore in the southern end of Claregalway, approximately eight miles east of Galway city in County Galway, Ireland. The club is almost exclusively concerned with hurling.

== Honours ==
- Galway Senior Hurling Championship:
  - Runner-up (6): 1947, 1971, 1975, 1992, 1993, 1996
- Galway Minor Hurling Championship:

Minor A 2019

Minor B 1992,2021

U20 A1,2025

U20 B 2026

U16 B1 2026

U21 B 1987
