= Kiltormer GAA =

Gaelic sports club in County Galway, Ireland

Kiltormer
- Cill Tormóir
- Founded: 1969
- County: Galway
- Colours: Blue and white

Playing kits
Standard colours

Senior Club Championships
	All Ireland	Connacht champions	Galway champions
Hurling:	1	3	5

Kiltormer GAA is a Gaelic Athletic Association club based in the Clontuskert, Lawrencetown and Kiltormer areas outside Ballinasloe, County Galway, Ireland. The club is primarily concerned with the game of hurling.

== Overview ==
=== History ===
Gaelic games in the Kiltormer area have been recorded as far back as 1897. Down through the years Clontuskert, Lawrencetown and Kiltormer affiliated separate teams, while Ganaveen and Tristaun also formed separate clubs.

In 1969 a decision was finally made to bring the three areas together and form a club under one name. Kiltormer was chosen as the club name and the club colours were to be blue and white. Almost immediately, success followed with the winning of minor, under-21, and intermediate championships.

On 6 October 2024, Kiltormer were defeated on a score line of 0-16 to 1-19 points in the Galway Intermediate Championship relegation final by Kilbeacanty. Kiltormer will play in the Galway Junior A Hurling Championship for the 2025 season.

=== Honours ===
- All-Ireland Senior Club Hurling Championships: 1
  - 1992
- Connacht Senior Club Hurling Championships: 3
  - 1982, 1990, 1991
- Galway Senior Club Hurling Championships: 5
  - 1976, 1977, 1982, 1990, 1991

=== Notable players ===
- Justin Campbell
- Andy Fenton
- Conor Hayes
- Ollie Kilkenny
- Tony Kilkenny
