= Killimordaly GAA =

Gaelic sports club in County Galway, Ireland

Killimordaly
- Cill Íomair Dálaigh
- Founded: 1912
- County: Galway
- Colours: Green and white
- Coordinates: 53.302033°N 8.623364°W

Playing kits
Standard colours

Senior Club Championships
	All Ireland	Connacht champions	Galway champions
Hurling:	-	1	1

Killimordaly GAA is a hurling club located in the village of Killimordaly in east County Galway. The club was founded in 1912.

== Honours ==
- Galway Senior Hurling Championship (1): 1986
- Connacht Senior Club Hurling Championship (1): 1986
- Connacht Intermediate Club Hurling Championship: (2) 2007, 2013

== Notable players ==
- Brian Concannon
- Tom Donoghue
- Tony Keady
- John Ryan
- Éanna Ryan
