= Duggan Park =

Sports venue in County Galway

- Páirc Ó Dubhagain
- Interactive map of Duggan Park
- Location: Harris Road, Ballinasloe, County Galway, Ireland
- Coordinates: 53.3308°N 8.2293°W
- Owner: Galway GAA
- Capacity: 3,000
- Public transit: Ballinasloe (1.2 km walk); Ballinasloe bus stop (route 763)

Construction
- Opened: 1934

Duggan Park (Irish: Páirc Ó Dubhagain) is a GAA stadium in Ballinasloe, County Galway, Ireland.

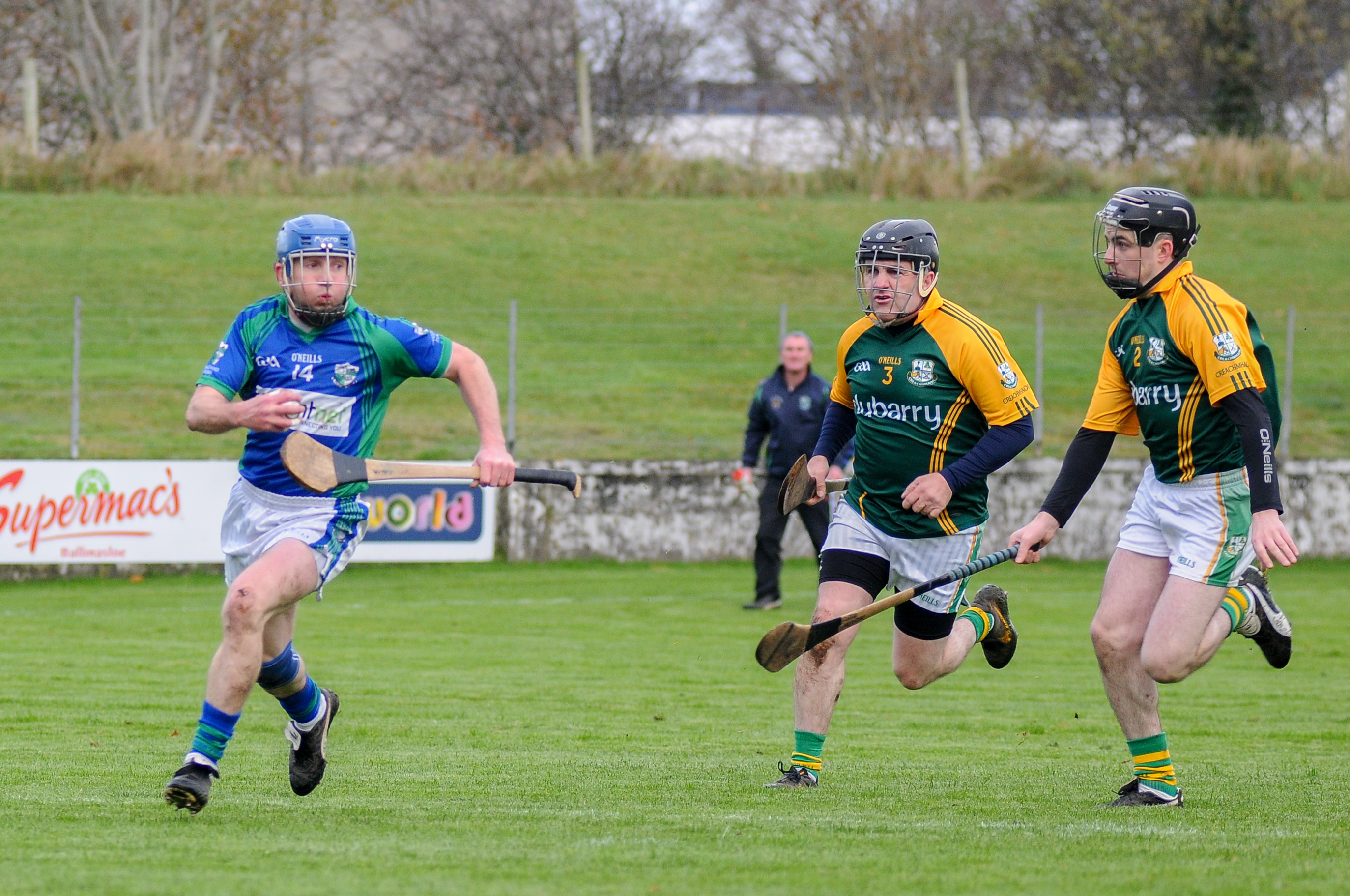
Action from a 2015 game at Duggan Park: Kevin Broderick (Tynagh-Abbey/Duniry) against Kieran Rabbitte and Brian Waldron (Craughwell)

The ground, named after the Catholic Bishop of Clonfert Patrick Duggan, was opened in 1934 and has a capacity of 3,000.

== See also ==
- List of Gaelic Athletic Association stadiums
- List of stadiums in Ireland by capacity
