= 2022 Galway Senior Hurling Championship =

Annual hurling competition season

Tournament details
- County: Galway
- Year: 2022
- Sponsor: Brooks

Winners
- Champions: St. Thomas' (6th win)
- Manager: Kenneth Burke
- Captain: Conor Cooney

Promotion/Relegation
- Promoted team(s): Killimor
- Relegated team(s): Tynagh-Abbey/Duniry

Other
- Player of the Year: Mark Caulfield

The 2022 Galway Senior Hurling Championship was the 125th staging of the Galway Senior Hurling Championship since its establishment in 1887. St Thomas' won their fifth consecutive title in a row after defeating Loughrea in a replay at Pearse Stadium on 27 November.

Moycullen participated in the senior championship having beaten Killimor in the 2021 Galway Intermediate Hurling Championship. The competition was sponsored by Brooks for the third of a 3-year partnership that started in 2020.

Tynagh-Abbey/Duniry were relegated, losing the relegation playoff to Ahascragh-Fohenagh and will play in the 2023 Galway Intermediate Hurling Championship.

Killimor won the 2022 Galway Intermediate Hurling Championship and will play Senior B in 2023.

== Competition format ==
Twenty four teams competed. Twelve teams as determined by the 2021 Competition competed in the Senior A Group and twelve teams competed in the Senior B Group. Eight teams from the Senior A Group and four teams from the Senior B Group progressed to the knockout stage.

== Group stage ==
=== Senior A ===
Senior A consisted of 12 teams divided into two groups of 6 teams.

- The top two teams in each group progressed directly to the Quarter-Finals
- The 3rd and 4th placed teams qualified for the Preliminary Quarter-Finals
- All 12 of these teams will play in the 2023 Championship

==== Senior A – Group 1 ====
Pos	Team	Pld	W	D	L	SF	SA	Diff	Pts
1	St. Thomas'	5	4	0	1	10–98	10–92	6	8
2	Sarsfields	5	3	1	1	11–89	4–92	18	7
3	Clarinbridge	5	2	2	1	7–108	9–93	9	6
4	Turloughmore	5	3	0	2	6–95	1–78	32	6
5	Killimordaly	5	1	0	4	4–71	8–100	-41	2
6	Castlegar	5	0	1	4	3–88	10–97	-24	1

30 July 2022; 17:45; Round 1	Clarinbridge	1-21 - 1-16	Killimordaly	Kenny Park, Athenry; Referee: Paul Fahy
30 July 2022; 17:45; Round 1	Evan Niland (0-14, 0-9 frees); Mark Kennedy (1-3); Sean Kilduff, Josh Ryan, Mike Daly, Niall Armstrong (0-1)		Brian Burke (1-5, 0-5 frees); Paul Creaven (0-3); David Concannon, Mark Lally, Brian Concannon, Luke Lynskey (0-2)	Kenny Park, Athenry; Referee: Paul Fahy

30 July 2022; 17:45; Round 1	Turloughmore	2-18 - 1-10	Castlegar	Pearse Stadium; Referee: Conor Quinlan
30 July 2022; 17:45; Round 1	Sean Loftus (0-9, 0-2 frees, 0-1 '65); Tom Quirke (1-1); Fergal Moore (1-0); Diarmuid Mullen, Sean Linnane, Barry Callanan (0-2); Jamie Holland (0-1 free); Aaron O'Shaughnessy (0-1)		Oisin Connolly (1-2, 0-2 frees); Ger Farragher (0-3); Jack Coyne (0-2); Donall Barry, Dylan Carrol, Greg Thomas (0-1)	Pearse Stadium; Referee: Conor Quinlan

31 July 2022; 14:00; Round 1	St. Thomas'	2-25 - 3-19	Sarsfields	Kenny Park, Athenry; Referee: Brian Keoghan
31 July 2022; 14:00; Round 1	Conor Cooney (1-8, 0-3 frees); James Regan, Eanna Burke (0-5); Damien McGlynn (1-1); David Burke, Darragh Burke (0-2); Bernard Burke, Oisin Flannery (0-1)		Niall Morrissey (0-8, 0-7 frees, 0-1 '65); Alex Connaire (1-3); Kevin Cooney (2-0); Darren Murphy (0-4); Darren Morrissey (0-2); Adam Donoghue, Joseph Cooney (0-1)	Kenny Park, Athenry; Referee: Brian Keoghan

20 August 2022; 18:45; Round 2	Clarinbridge	0-24 - 0-17	Turloughmore	Kenny Park, Athenry; Referee: Liam Gordon
20 August 2022; 18:45; Round 2	Evan Niland (0-14, 0-11 frees); Mark Kennedy (0-4); Gavin Lee (0-3); Sean Kilduff, Niall Armstrong, TJ Brennan (0-1)		Sean Loftus (0-9, 0-5 frees); Jamie Holland (0-3 frees); Daithi Burke (0-2); Matthew Tarpey, Tom Quirke, Barry Callanan (0-1)	Kenny Park, Athenry; Referee: Liam Gordon

21 August 2022; 12:00; Round 2	St. Thomas'	2-20 - 1-14	Killimordaly	Duggan Park, Ballinasloe; Referee: Christopher Browne
21 August 2022; 12:00; Round 2	Conor Cooney (1-11, 0-9 frees, 0-1 '65); Eanna Burke (0-3); Victor Manso (1-0); Bernard Burke (0-2); Fintan Burke, Cathal Burke, Darragh Burke, Oisin Flannery (0-1)	Report	Brian Burke (0-9, 0-7 frees, 0-1 '65); David Earls (1-0); Brian Concannon (0-2); Paul Madden, David Concannon, Luke Lynskey (0-1)	Duggan Park, Ballinasloe; Referee: Christopher Browne

21 August 2022; 17:45; Round 2	Sarsfields	2-19 - 1-13	Castlegar	Kenny Park, Athenry; Referee: Derek Kelly
21 August 2022; 17:45; Round 2	Niall Morrissey (0-7, 0-6 frees, 0-1 '65); Kevin Cooney (1-4, 0-1 free); Darren Murphy (1-2); Ian Fox, Alex Connaire (0-2); Cathal Dillon, Adam Donoghue (0-1)		Ger Farragher (0-9, 0-5 frees, 0-3 '65s); Greg Thomas, Cian O'Callaghan (1-0); Tomás Mannion (0-2); Oisin Connolly, Dean Higgins (0-1)	Kenny Park, Athenry; Referee: Derek Kelly

4 September 2022; 12:00; Round 3	St. Thomas'	2-19 - 0-19	Castlegar	Pearse Stadium; Referee: Liam Gordon
4 September 2022; 12:00; Round 3	Conor Cooney (1-8, 0-8 frees, 1-0 penalty); Damien McGlynn (1-3); James Regan, Darragh Burke (0-2); Cathal Burke, Eanna Burke, John Headd (0-1); David Burke (0-1 frees)		Ger Farragher (0-11, 0-8 frees); Cillian O'Callaghan (0-3); Donal Higgins, Dylan Carrol, Donal McGreal, Darragh Neary, Jack Coyne (0-1)	Pearse Stadium; Referee: Liam Gordon

4 September 2022; 13:45; Round 3	Turloughmore	2-20 - 0-12	Killimordaly	Pearse Stadium; Referee: Karol Collins
4 September 2022; 13:45; Round 3	Sean Loftus (1-9, 0-6 frees); Barry Callanan (1-2); Sean Linnane (0-4); Sean O'Hanlon, Aaron O'Shaughnessy (0-2); Jamie Holland (0-1)		Brian Burke (0-5, 0-3 frees, 0-1 '65); Brian Concannon (0-3); Mark Lally, Paul Creaven, Tommy Earls (0-1)	Pearse Stadium; Referee: Karol Collins

4 September 2022; 17:15; Round 3	Sarsfields	3-16 - 1-22	Clarinbridge	Duggan Park, Ballinasloe; Referee: Shane Hynes
4 September 2022; 17:15; Round 3	Niall Morrissey (0-8, 0-5 frees, 0-1 '65); Kevin Cooney (2-1, 0-1 penalty); John Cooney (1-0); Adam Donoghue (0-3); Joseph Cooney, Niall Quinn, John Cosgrove, Alex Connaire (0-1)		Evan Niland (0-8 frees); Mark Kennedy (0-7); TJ Brennan (1-1); Gavin Lee (0-3); Sean Kilduff (0-2); David Lee (0-1)	Duggan Park, Ballinasloe; Referee: Shane Hynes

17 September 2022; 15:15; Round 4	Turloughmore	2-23 - 0-14	St. Thomas'	Kenny Park, Athenry; Referee: Shane Hynes
17 September 2022; 15:15; Round 4	Sean Loftus (1-12, 0-5 frees, 0-1 penalty); Tom Quirke (1-0); Sean Linnane, Sean O'Hanlon, Barry Callanan (0-2); Mark Murphy, Jamie Holland, Fergal Moore, Mikey Morris, Aaron O'Shaughnessy (0-1)		Conor Cooney (0-10, 0-8 frees); Eanna Burke (0-2); Victor Manso, Oisin Flannery (0-1)	Kenny Park, Athenry; Referee: Shane Hynes

18 September 2022; 13:45; Round 4	Clarinbridge	1-24 - 1-24	Castlegar	Pearse Stadium; Referee: Conor Quinlan
18 September 2022; 13:45; Round 4	Evan Niland (0-11, 0-10 frees); Mark Kennedy (1-5); Gavin Lee, Mike Daly (0-3); Sean Kilduff, David Lee (0-1)		Ger Farragher (0-12, 0-10 frees); Jack Coyne (1-1); Dean Higgins, Cian O'Callaghan, Oisin Connolly, Enda Concannon (0-2); Donall Barry, Donal McGreal, Darragh Neary (0-1)	Pearse Stadium; Referee: Conor Quinlan

18 September 2022; 15:15; Round 4	Sarsfields	3-17 - 0-12	Killimordaly	Kenny Park, Athenry; Referee: John Keane
18 September 2022; 15:15; Round 4	Niall Morrissey (0-9, 0-8 frees, 0-1 '65); Kevin Cooney (1-3); Alex Connaire (1-1); Jeffrey Lawless (1-0); Ian Fox (0-2); Niall Quinn, Darren Murphy (0-1)		Paul Creaven (0-8 frees); Darren Daly, Mark Lally (0-2); David Concannon (0-1)	Kenny Park, Athenry; Referee: John Keane

30 September 2022; 19:30; Round 5	Killimordaly	2-17 - 0-22	Castlegar	Duggan Park, Ballinasloe; Referee: Peter Murphy
30 September 2022; 19:30; Round 5	Darren Daly (1-5, 1-0 penalty, 0-3 frees, 0-1 '65); Paul Creaven (0-7, 0-5 frees); Brian Concannon (1-3); David Concannon, Luke Lynskey (0-1)		Ger Farragher (0-8, 0-6 frees); Enda Concannon (0-3); Sean Neary, Des Hynes, Oisin Connolly, Darragh Neary (0-2); Dean Higgins, Dylan Carroll, Jason O'Gorman (0-1)	Duggan Park, Ballinasloe; Referee: Peter Murphy

1 October 2022; 16:30; Round 5	Sarsfields	0-18 - 0-17	Turloughmore	Duggan Park, Ballinasloe; Referee: Liam Gordon
1 October 2022; 16:30; Round 5	Niall Morrissey (0-7 frees); Niall Quinn, Alex Connaire, Kevin Cooney (0-2); Kevin Hynes, Joseph Cooney, Ian Fox, Darren Murphy, Mark O'Regan (0-1)		Sean Loftus (0-9, 0-6 frees); Daithi Burke (0-2), Jamie Holland, Sean Linnane, Sean O'Hanlon, Tom Quirke, Barry Callanan, Aaron O'Shaughnessy (0-1)	Duggan Park, Ballinasloe; Referee: Liam Gordon

1 October 2022; 16:30; Round 5	St. Thomas'	4-20 - 4-17	Clarinbridge	Kenny Park, Athenry; Referee: Karol Collins
1 October 2022; 16:30; Round 5	Conor Cooney (1-11, 0-7 frees); Darragh Burke (1-4); Victor Manso (1-1); Bernard Burke (1-0); Damien McGlynn (0-2); John Headd, Oisin Flannery (0-1)		Evan Niland (0-7, 0-6 frees, 0-1 '65); Sean Kilduff, TJ Brennan (1-2); Mike Daly (1-1, 1-0 penalty); Gavin Lee (1-1); Mark Kennedy (0-3), Cian Salmon (0-1)	Kenny Park, Athenry; Referee: Karol Collins

==== Senior A – Group 2 ====
Pos	Team	Pld	W	D	L	SF	SA	Diff	Pts
1	Loughrea	5	5	0	0	7–105	4–78	36	10
2	Tommy Larkin's	5	3	1	1	11–91	2–93	25	7
3	Cappataggle	5	2	2	1	6–98	5–92	9	6
4	Craughwell	5	2	1	2	9–77	6–79	7	5
5	Gort	5	1	0	4	6–94	9–88	-3	2
6	Kilconieron	5	0	0	5	1–74	14–109	-74	0

30 July 2022; 17:15; Round 1	Cappataggle	2-16 - 1-16	Gort	Loughrea; Referee: Derek Kelly
30 July 2022; 17:15; Round 1	Liam Collins (0-5 frees); Daniel Nevin (1-2, 1-0 penalty); Jarlath Mannion (1-2); Niall Collins (0-4); Declan Cronin, Michael Garvey, Alan Dolan (0-1)		Richie Cummins (1-2); Jason Grealish (0-4); Aiden Helebert (0-4, 0-3 frees); Eoin Killeen (0-2); Aidan Harte, Jack Linnane, Karlen Higgins, Ronan Burke (0-1)	Loughrea; Referee: Derek Kelly

30 July 2022; 19:45; Round 1	Loughrea	1-18 - 1-17	Tommy Larkin's	Duggan Park, Ballinasloe; Referee: Liam Gordon
30 July 2022; 19:45; Round 1	Martin McManus (1-3); Neil Keary (0-4, 0-3 frees); Sean Sweeney, Oisin Coyle, Joe Mooney (0-2); Jamie Ryan (0-2 frees); Brian Keary, Johnny Coen, Tiernan Killeen (0-1)		Jason Flynn (1-13, 0-11 frees); Colm Flynn (0-2); Conor Gardiner, Cian Duggan (0-1)	Duggan Park, Ballinasloe; Referee: Liam Gordon

1 August 2022; 17:00; Round 1	Craughwell	2-15 - 0-9	Kilconieron	Loughrea; Referee: Peter Murphy
1 August 2022; 17:00; Round 1	Thomas Monaghan (1-10, 1-7 frees); Stephen O'Halloran (1-0); Patrick Monaghan, Adam Clarke, Jamie Ryan, Dean Callanan, Thomas Hynes (0-1)		Shane Caulfield (0-3, 0-2 frees); Sean Connaughton (0-2 frees); Brian Hickey, Ultan McGlynn, Ian McGlynn, Luke Uniacke (0-1)	Loughrea; Referee: Peter Murphy

20 August 2022; 17:00; Round 2	Loughrea	1-22 - 2-16	Craughwell	Kenny Park, Athenry; Referee: John Keane
20 August 2022; 17:00; Round 2	Neil Keary (0-10, 0-7 frees, 0-1 '65); Johnny Coen (1-1, 1-0 penalty); Jamie Ryan, Martin McManus (0-4); Brian Keary, Tiernan Kileen, Joe Mooney (0-1)		Thomas Monaghan (0-14, 0-12 frees, 0-1 '65); Dean Callanan (1-1); Jamie Ryan (1-0); Shane Dolan (0-1)	Kenny Park, Athenry; Referee: John Keane

21 August 2022; 13:00; Round 2	Cappataggle	4-26 - 1-21	Kilconieron	Loughrea; Referee: Noel Quinn
21 August 2022; 13:00; Round 2	Liam Collins (1-12, 0-6 frees, 0-1 '65, 0-1 sideline); Daniel Nevin (1-3); Declan Cronin, Jarlath Mannion (1-2); Darragh Dolan (1-1); Alan Dolan (0-2); Oisin Finn, Paul Claffey, Niall Collins, Eanna Garvey (0-1)		Sean Connaughton (0-7 frees); Shane Caulfield (0-5, 0-3 frees); Conor Caulfield (1-0); Keith Burke (0-3); Ian McGlynn (0-2); Brian Hickey, Ultan McGlynn, Luke Uniacke, Colin Curley (0-1)	Loughrea; Referee: Noel Quinn

21 August 2022; 16:00; Round 2	Tommy Larkin's	1-23 - 1-21	Gort	Kenny Park, Athenry; Referee: Shane Hynes
21 August 2022; 16:00; Round 2	Jason Flynn (0-14, 0-10 frees, 0-1 '65); Darren Duggan (1-0), Conor Gardiner (0-3); Colm Flynn, Ronan Murphy (0-2); Cathal Tuohy, Conor Hanley (0-1)		Aiden Helebert (0-16, 0-10 frees); Jason Grealish (1-2); Richie Cummins (1-0); S Óg Linnane, Kaelen Higgins, Lorcon Walsh (0-1)	Kenny Park, Athenry; Referee: Shane Hynes

3 September 2022; 15:30; Round 3	Cappataggle	0-17 - 1-14	Craughwell	Duggan Park, Ballinasloe; Referee: Brian Keon
3 September 2022; 15:30; Round 3	Liam Collins (0-9, 0-4 frees, 0-1 '65); Declan Cronin, Dan Nevin, Jarlath Mannion (0-2); Darragh Dolan, Alan Dolan (0-1)		Thomas Monaghan (0-9, 0-7 frees); Shane Dolan (1-2); James Greaney, Shaun Gilligan (0-1); Adrian Prendergast (0-1 '65)	Duggan Park, Ballinasloe; Referee: Brian Keon

3 September 2022; 17:15; Round 3	Loughrea	2-20 - 1-13	Gort	Pearse Stadium; Referee: Paul Fahy
3 September 2022; 17:15; Round 3	Neil Keary (0-6, 0-5 frees); Joe Mooney (1-3); Anthony Burns (1-1); Dylan Shaughnessy (0-3); Martin McManus (0-2); Brian Keary, Johnny Coen, Ian Hanrahan, Tiernan Killeen, Jamie Ryan (0-1)		Aiden Helebert (0-9, 0-7 frees); Richie Cummins (1-0); Aidan Harte (0-2); Paddy Cummins, Caoimhin Marren (0-1)	Pearse Stadium; Referee: Paul Fahy

4 September 2022; 14:30; Round 3	Tommy Larkin's	4-17 - 0-17	Kilconieron	Loughrea; Referee: Ger O'Connor
4 September 2022; 14:30; Round 3	Jason Flynn (1-6, 0-5 frees); Ronan Murphy (3-0); Colm Flynn(0-3); Eanna Murphy (0-2 frees); Eoghan Nevin (0-2); Cian Daniels, Kevin McHugo, Conor Gardiner, Cian Duggan (0-1)		Sean Connaughton (0-9, 0-8 frees); Luke Uniacke, Conor Caulfield (0-3); Brian Hickey, Paul Uniacke (0-1)	Loughrea; Referee: Ger O'Connor

17 September 2022; 17:00; Round 4	Loughrea	1-23 - 0-18	Cappataggle	Kenny Park, Athenry; Referee: John McDonagh
17 September 2022; 17:00; Round 4	Neil Keary (1-8, 0-6 frees); Dylan Shaughnessy, Martin McManus (0-3); Brian Keary, Jamie Ryan, Anthony Burns, Joe Mooney (0-2); Ian Hanrahan (0-1)		Jarlath Mannion (0-5); Liam Collins (0-5, 0-4 frees); Niall Collins, Daniel Nevin (0-2); Declan Cronin, Paul Claffey, Darragh Dolan, Alan Dolan (0-1)	Kenny Park, Athenry; Referee: John McDonagh

18 September 2022; 12:00; Round 4	Gort	2-29 - 0-13	Kilconieron	Loughrea; Referee: Liam Gordon
18 September 2022; 12:00; Round 4	Aiden Helebert (0-9, 0-6 frees, 0-1 '65); Richie Cummins (0-6); Aidan Harte, Paddy Cummins (1-2); Jason Grealish (0-4); Eoin Killeen, Nathan Gill (0-2); Kaelen Higgins, Lorcon Walsh (0-1)		Conor Caulfield (0-4, 0-3 frees); Sean Connaughton (0-3, 0-2 frees); Colin Curley, Sean Burke (0-2); Keith Burke, Ultan McGlynn (0-1)	Loughrea; Referee: Liam Gordon

18 September 2022; 17:00; Round 4	Tommy Larkin's	4-16 - 0-16	Craughwell	Kenny Park, Athenry; Referee: Karol Collins
18 September 2022; 17:00; Round 4	Conor Gardiner (1-5); Jason Flynn (1-4, 0-3 frees); Gerard Kelly (1-2); Cian Duggan (1-0); Ronan Murphy (0-2); Eanna Murphy, Eoghan Nevin, Colm Flynn (0-1)		Thomas Monaghan (0-6, 0-3 frees); Keelan Cullinane (0-4, 0-3 frees); Dean Callanan (0-2); Patrick Monaghan, Jamie Ryan, Shane Dolan, Brian Dolan (0-1)	Kenny Park, Athenry; Referee: Karol Collins

2 October 2022; 12:00; Round 5	Loughrea	2-22 - 0-14	Kilconieron	Gort; Referee: Alan Kelly
2 October 2022; 12:00; Round 5	Neil Keary (0-10, 0-8 frees); Joe Mooney (2-2); Sean Sweeney (0-3); Ian Hanrahan, Darren Shaughnessy, Martin McManus (0-2); Tiernan Killeen (0-1)		Conor Caulfield (0-5, 0-4 frees); Cathal Bryan (0-2); Keith Burke, Brian Hickey, Ian McGlynn, Colin Curley, Sean Burke, Niall Dillon, Luke Uniake (0-1)	Gort; Referee: Alan Kelly

2 October 2022; 16:00; Round 5	Tommy Larkin's	1-18 - 0-21	Cappataggle	Loughrea; Referee: Shane Hynes
2 October 2022; 16:00; Round 5	Jason Flynn (1-4, 0-4 frees); Ronan Murphy (0-4, 0-1 free); Colm Flynn (0-3); Conor Gardiner, Cian Duggan (0-2); Darren Duggan, Kevin McHugo, Gerard Kelly (0-1)		Liam Collins (0-12, 0-6 frees, 0-1 '65); Dan Nevin (0-3, 0-2 frees); Niall Collins (0-3); Paul Claffey, David Malone, Darragh Dolan (0-1)	Loughrea; Referee: Shane Hynes

2 October 2022; 16:00; Round 5	Craughwell	4-16 - 1-15	Gort	Pearse Stadium; Referee: Paul Fahy
2 October 2022; 16:00; Round 5	Adrian Prendergast (1-7, 0-3 frees, 1-0 penalty); Jamie Ryan (2-2); Thomas Monaghan, Patrick Monaghan (0-3); Ryan Howley (1-0); Dean Callanan (0-1)		Aiden Helebert (0-7 frees); Caoimhin Marren (1-1); Jason Grealish (0-3, 0-1 sideline); Richie Cummins, Nathan Gill (0-2)	Pearse Stadium; Referee: Paul Fahy

=== Senior B ===
Senior B consisted of 12 teams divided into two groups of 6.

- The top team from each group
  - qualified for the Preliminary Quarter-Finals
  - will play in the 2023 Championship
- The second and third placed teams cross-played with the winners also qualifying for the Preliminary Quarter-Finals

==== Senior B – Group 1 ====
Pos	Team	Pld	W	D	L	SF	SA	Diff	Pts
1	Oranmore-Maree	5	4	0	1	6–90	3–76	23	8
2	Moycullen	5	4	0	1	9–95	9–84	11	8
3	Athenry	5	3	0	2	3–90	5–84	0	6
4	Kilnadeema-Leitrim	5	3	0	2	10–115	9–94	24	6
5	Beagh	5	1	0	4	5–83	7–101	-24	2
6	Tynagh-Abbey/Duniry	5	0	0	5	5–80	1–84	-34	0

29 July 2022; 19:15; Round 1	Moycullen	2-14 - 1-12	Athenry	Kenny Park, Athenry; Referee: Ger O'Connor
29 July 2022; 19:15; Round 1	Cian Folan (1-2); James Bradley (0-5, 0-2 frees); Niall Mannion (1-1); Colm Cunningham (0-3); Eanna Noone, Diarmuid Davoren, Gary Bohan (0-1)		Donal Parr (1-7, 0-6 frees, 0-1 penalty); Cathal Keane (0-2); Ciaran O'Dwyer, Martin Cullen, Paddy Rabbitte (0-1)	Kenny Park, Athenry; Referee: Ger O'Connor

31 July 2022; 15:45; Round 1	Kilnadeema-Leitrim	2-30 - 2-18	Tynagh-Abbey/Duniry	Kenny Park, Athenry; Referee: Christopher Browne
31 July 2022; 15:45; Round 1	Brian Molloy (1-10, 0-8 frees); Colm Molloy (1-6); Michael Lynch (0-5); Stephen Molloy (0-4); Dylan Towolawi (0-2); Stephen Roche, Liam Kelly, Vinnie Kenny (0-1)		Shane Maloney (1-12, 0-9 frees, 1-0 sideline, 0-1 '65); Padraig Breheny (1-1); Johnny Conroy (0-3); David Jordan, Shane Flynn (0-1)	Kenny Park, Athenry; Referee: Christopher Browne

1 August 2022; 17:00; Round 1	Oranmore-Maree	2-16 - 1-9	Beagh	Kenny Park, Athenry; Referee: Liam Gordon
1 August 2022; 17:00; Round 1	Niall Burke (0-10, 0-5 frees); Anthony Keady, Ronan Hanniffy (1-1); Diarmuid Hanniffy (0-2); Gavin Smyth, Evan O'Rourke (0-1)		Evan Hunt (0-4 frees); Kevin Keehan (1-0); Adrian Touhey, Daithi Keane (0-2); Eoin Mahon (0-1)	Kenny Park, Athenry; Referee: Liam Gordon

20 August 2022; 18:45; Round 2	Moycullen	2-24 - 3-15	Beagh	Pearse Stadium; Referee: Conor Quinlan
20 August 2022; 18:45; Round 2	James Bradley (0-10, 0-8 frees); Eanna Noone (2-3); Cillian Davoren, Cian Folan, Diarmuid Davoren, Fiachra McDonagh (0-2); Gary Bohan, Colm Cunningham, Niall Mannion (0-1)		E Hunt (0-8, 0-5 frees); Tommy McKeown (1-1); Padraic Landers (2-0); Daithi Keane (0-3); Joe Gantley (0-2); John Staunton (0-1)	Pearse Stadium; Referee: Conor Quinlan

20 August 2022; 18:45; Round 2	Oranmore-Maree	1-16 - 0-13	Tynagh-Abbey/Duniry	Gort; Referee: Ger O'Connor
20 August 2022; 18:45; Round 2	Niall Burke (0-9, 0-4 frees, 0-1 '65); Ruben Davitt (1-0); Diarmuid Hanniffy (0-2); Patrick Burke, Ross Malone, Evan O'Rourke, Anthony Keady (0-1)		Shane Moloney (0-7, 0-4 frees); Padraig Breheny (0-2); Colm Larkin, Johnny Conroy, Micheal Power, Ben Moran (0-1)	Gort; Referee: Ger O'Connor

21 August 2022; 14:30; Round 2	Athenry	2-22 - 3-17	Kilnadeema-Leitrim	Loughrea; Referee: Ronan Stankard
21 August 2022; 14:30; Round 2	Donal Parr (0-9, 0-8 frees); Cathal Keane (2-3); Ronan Hardiman (0-5); Paddy Hannon (0-3); Paddy Rabbitte, Ryan O'Donnell (0-1)		Brian Molloy (2-11, 1-10 frees, 1-0 penalty); Stephen Roche (1-0); Colm Molloy, Conor Molloy (0-2); Dylan Towolawi, Michael Lynch (0-1)	Loughrea; Referee: Ronan Stankard

3 September 2022; 17:15; Round 3	Moycullen	1-20 - 2-14	Tynagh-Abbey/Duniry	Kenny Park, Athenry; Referee: Conor Quinlan
3 September 2022; 17:15; Round 3	James Bradley (0-7, 0-6 frees); Eanna Noone (0-4, 0-3 frees); Cian Folan (1-1); Colm Cunningham (0-3); Diarmuid Davoren (0-2); Anraoí Whyte, Gary Bohan, Fionn McDonagh (0-1)		Shane Moloney (2-9, 1-9 frees); Ben Moran (0-2); David Jordan, Johnny Conroy, Padraig Robinson (0-1)	Kenny Park, Athenry; Referee: Conor Quinlan

4 September 2022; 12:00; Round 3	Kilnadeema-Leitrim	1-25 - 2-17	Oranmore-Maree	Kilbacanty; Referee: Brian Keon
4 September 2022; 12:00; Round 3	Brian Molloy (1-14, 0-10 frees, 1-0 penalty); Vinnie Kenny (0-5); Colm Molloy (0-4); Conor Molloy, Liam Kelly (0-1)		Niall Burke (0-10, 0-7 frees, 0-1 '65); Ruben Davitt (1-1); Eanna Burke (1-0); Diarmuid Hanniffy, Hubert Costello (0-2); Patrick Burke, Anthony Keady (0-1)	Kilbacanty; Referee: Brian Keon

4 September 2022; 13:30; Round 3	Athenry	0-21 - 0-17	Beagh	Kenny Park, Athenry; Referee: Sean Byrne
4 September 2022; 13:30; Round 3	Donal Parr (0-7 frees); Ronan Hardiman (0-3); Martin Cullen, Paddy Hannon, Cathal Keane, Kelvin Langan (0-2); Shane Quirke, Cillian Lawless, Paddy Rabbite (0-1)		Evan Hunt (0-7, 0-6 frees); Daithi Keane, Joe Gantley (0-2); Oisin Forde, Ferdia Tuohey, Adrian Tuohey, Donnacha Lucey, Eoin Mahon, Padraic Landers (0-1)	Kenny Park, Athenry; Referee: Sean Byrne

17 September 2022; 15:15; Round 4	Oranmore-Maree	0-20 - 0-12	Athenry	Pearse Stadium; Referee: Conor Quinlan
17 September 2022; 15:15; Round 4	Niall Burke (0-11, 0-5 frees, 0-1 '65); Diarmuid Hanniffy, C Hanniffy, Marcus Quinn (0-2); Ross Malone, Rueben Davitt, Simon Dunne (0-1)		Donal Parr (0-4 frees); Cathal Keane (0-3, 0-2 frees); Shane Quirke, Tom Flynn, Cillian Lawless, Paddy Rabbitte (0-1); Mickey Mullins (0-1 free)	Pearse Stadium; Referee: Conor Quinlan

17 September 2022; 17:00; Round 4	Moycullen	3-20 - 2-22	Kilnadeema-Leitrim	Pearse Stadium; Referee: Noel Quinn
17 September 2022; 17:00; Round 4	James Bradley (0-9, 0-6 frees); Cian Folan (1-3); Eanna Noone (1-3, 1-0 penalty, 0-1 free, 0-1 '65); Kevin O'Donovan (1-0); Colm Cunningham (0-2); Cillian Davoren, Diarmuid Davoren, Niall Mannion (0-1)		Brian Molloy (0-9, 0-5 frees); Michael Lynch (1-3); Colmn Molloy (0-6); Damiel Comar (1-1); Stephen Molloy, Stephen Roche, Vinnie Kenny (0-1)	Pearse Stadium; Referee: Noel Quinn

18 September 2022; 13:45; Round 4	Beagh	1-25 - 1-19	Tynagh-Abbey/Duniry	Loughrea; Referee: Derek Kelly
18 September 2022; 13:45; Round 4	Evan Hunt (0-11, 0-6 frees); Daithi Keane (1-4); Joe Gantley (0-3); Adrian Tuohey (0-2); Eoin Mahon, Tommy McKeown, Kevin Keehan, Padraic Landers, Oisin Forde (0-1)		Shane Moloney (0-9, 0-6 frees, 0-1 sideline); Padraig Breheney (1-1); Ben Moran (0-4); Johnny Conroy (0-2); Niall Moloney, Padraig Robinson (0-1)	Loughrea; Referee: Derek Kelly

1 October 2022; 16:30; Round 5	Oranmore-Maree	1-21 - 1-17	Moycullen	Pearse Stadium; Referee: Sean Byrne
1 October 2022; 16:30; Round 5	Niall Burke (1-7, 0-6 frees); Evan O'Rourke (0-4); Ronan Hanniffy, Ruben Davitt (0-3); Diarmuid Hanniffy (0-2); Ross Malone, Marcus Quinn (0-1)		James Bradley (0-10 frees); Eanna Noone (1-1 frees); Cian Folan (0-3); Diarmuid Davoren (0-2); Niall Mannion (0-1)	Pearse Stadium; Referee: Sean Byrne

1 October 2022; 16:30; Round 5	Kilnadeema-Leitrim	2-21 - 0-17	Beagh	Loughrea; Referee: John McDonagh
1 October 2022; 16:30; Round 5	Brian Molloy (1-10, 0-7 frees, 1-0 penalty); Michael Lynch (1-0); Daniel Comar (0-3); Vinnie Kenny, Dylan Towalowai, Colm Molloy (0-2); Stephen Roche, Liam Kelly (0-1)		Evan Hunt (0-8, 0-7 frees); Daithi Keane (0-4); John Staunton (0-2); Adrian Tuohey, Oisin Forde (0-1)	Loughrea; Referee: John McDonagh

1 October 2022; 16:30; Round 5	Athenry	0-23 - 0-16	Tynagh-Abbey/Duniry	Gort; Referee: Ger O'Connor
1 October 2022; 16:30; Round 5	Donal Parr (0-9, 0-8 frees); Ronan Hardiman (0-4); Cillian Lawless, Mark Hannon (0-2); Mark Hardiman, Conor Burke, Paddy Rabbitte, Ciaran O'Dwyer, Elliott Langan, Martin Cullen (0-1)		Shane Moloney (0-3, 0-2 frees); Colm Larkin, Johnny Conroy, Ben Moran (0-2); Padraig Robinson (0-2, 0-1 free); Michael Power, Niall Moloney, John Dervan, David Jordan, Jack Moran (0-1)	Gort; Referee: Ger O'Connor

==== Senior B – Group 2 ====
Pos	Team	Pld	W	D	L	SF	SA	Diff	Pts
1	Portumna	5	5	0	0	6–103	6–74	29	10
2	Ardrahan	5	4	0	1	7–85	5–80	11	8
3	Liam Mellows	5	3	0	2	7–94	5–85	15	6
4	Pádraig Pearse's	5	1	0	4	3–77	5–81	-10	2
5	Mullagh	5	1	0	4	7–77	7–95	-18	2
6	Ahascragh-Fohenagh	5	1	0	4	3–78	5–99	-35	2

29 July 2022; 19:15; Round 1	Mullagh	2-11 - 0-15	Pádraig Pearse's	Duggan Park, Ballinasloe; Referee: Sean Byrne
29 July 2022; 19:15; Round 1	Ronan Glennon (1-7, 0-7 frees); Sean Callanan (1-0); Keith Coen (0-2); Damien Monaghan, Finnian Coone (0-1)		Emmet Ward (0-6, 0-4 frees); Ronan Bellew, Dean Reilly (0-3); Oisin Flannery, Colm Raftery, Tomas Flannery (0-1)	Duggan Park, Ballinasloe; Referee: Sean Byrne

30 July 2022; 16:00; Round 1	Ardrahan	1-19 - 2-11	Liam Mellows	Kenny Park, Athenry; Referee: Karol Collins
30 July 2022; 16:00; Round 1	Cianan Fahy (1-7, 0-5 frees, 0-1 '65); Ross Albertini (0-3); Oisin Slevin, Jason Kennedy, Sean Gardiner (0-2); Conor Cosgrove, Pierce McCrann, Liam Forde (0-1)		Adrian Morrissey (0-6, 0-5 frees); Jack Forde (1-2); Conor Kavanagh (1-1); Tadgh Haran (0-2);	Kenny Park, Athenry; Referee: Karol Collins

30 July 2022; 18:00; Round 1	Portumna	0-23 - 0-13	Ahascragh-Fohenagh	Duggan Park, Ballinasloe; Referee: Shane Hynes
30 July 2022; 18:00; Round 1	Joe Canning (0-9, 0-6 frees, 0-1 sideline); Declan McLoughlin (0-4); Ronan O'Meara, Adam Fogarty (0-3); Martin Tuohy, Neil Conneely, Sean Brien, Jamie Hogan (0-1)		Mark Kelly (0-5, 0-4 frees, 0-1 '65); Noel Warde (0-2); Padraic Mannion, Sean Bleahene, Stephen Kelly, Niall Glynn, Ronan Kelly (0-1); Cathal Mannion (0-1 free)	Duggan Park, Ballinasloe; Referee: Shane Hynes

19 August 2022; 19:00; Round 2	Liam Mellows	2-20 - 0-20	Mullagh	Kenny Park, Athenry; Referee: Karol Collins
19 August 2022; 19:00; Round 2	Adrian Morrissey (0-10, 0-4 frees); Tadgh Haran (0-5); Conor Kavanagh (1-1); Luke McPhilbin (0-3); Jack Hastings (1-0); Jack Forde (0-1)		Ronan Glennon (0-7, 0-6 frees); Damien Monaghan (0-3); Davy Glennon, Cathal Dervan (0-2); Oisin Coen, Sean Hardiman, Padraig Kennedy, Dean Finnerty, Sean Callanan, Keith Coen (0-1)	Kenny Park, Athenry; Referee: Karol Collins

20 August 2022; 17:00; Round 2	Portumna	0-19 - 1-14	Ardrahan	Gort; Referee: Paul Fahy
20 August 2022; 17:00; Round 2	Joe Canning (0-9, 0-6 frees, 0-1 '65, 0-1 sideline); Adam Fogarty (0-3, 0-1 free); Ronan O'Meara, Declan McLoughlin (0-2); Conor Goode, Martin Tuohy, Sean Brien (0-1)		Cianan Fahy (0-7, 0-5 frees); Liam Forde (0-3); Ian Lynskey (1-0); Ross Albertini (0-2); Pierce McCrann, Jason Kennedy (0-1)	Gort; Referee: Paul Fahy

20 August 2022; 17:00; Round 2	Pádraig Pearse's	0-18 - 0-13	Ahascragh-Fohenagh	Duggan Park, Ballinasloe; Referee: Sean Byrne
20 August 2022; 17:00; Round 2	Tomas Flannery (0-8 frees); Dean Reilly (0-7); Enda Cunniffe (0-2); Gareth Lally (0-1)		Cathal Mannion (0-4, 0-2 frees, 0-1 '65); Padraic Mannion (0-4, 0-1 frees); Stephen Kelly, Sean Bleahene, Eoghain Delaney, Niall Glynn, Robert Greene (0-1)	Duggan Park, Ballinasloe; Referee: Sean Byrne

3 September 2022; 17:15; Round 3	Portumna	1-19 - 2-11	Pádraig Pearse's	Duggan Park, Ballinasloe; Referee: John McDonagh
3 September 2022; 17:15; Round 3	Joe Canning (0-8, 0-7 frees, 0-1 '65); Declan McLoughlin (1-4); Ronan O'Meara (0-4); Neil Connelly (0-2); Jack Canning (0-1)		Emmet Ward (1-5 frees); Dean Reilly (1-1); Oisin Flannery, Enda Cunniffe, Conor Fahey, Colm Raftery, Jimmy Gelston (0-1)	Duggan Park, Ballinasloe; Referee: John McDonagh

4 September 2022; 15:30; Round 3	Liam Mellows	1-24 - 2-9	Ahascragh-Fohenagh	Duggan Park, Ballinasloe; Referee: Christopher Browne
4 September 2022; 15:30; Round 3	Adrian Morrissey (1-11, 0-6 frees, 0-1 '65); Tadhg Haran (0-6); Jack Forde (0-2); Ronan Elwood, Sean Morrissey, Luke McPhiblin, Jack Hastings, Conor Elwood (0-1)		Padraic Mannion (1-3, 0-2 frees); Sean Bleahene (1-1); Cathal Mannion (0-4, 0-3 frees, 0-1 '65); Niall Glynn (0-1)	Duggan Park, Ballinasloe; Referee: Christopher Browne

4 September 2022; 17:00; Round 3	Ardrahan	2-14 - 1-15	Mullagh	Kenny Park, Athenry; Referee: John Keane
4 September 2022; 17:00; Round 3	Cianan Fahy (0-8, 0-7 frees); Jason Kennedy (1-2); Sean Gardiner (1-0); Iarla Tannian, Pierce McCrann, Liam Forde, Ross Albertini (0-1)		Cathal Dervan (1-6, 0-5 frees, 1-0 penalty); Ronan Glennon (0-4, 0-3 frees); Davy Glennon (0-2); Oisin Coen, Damien Monaghan, Finnian Coone (0-1)	Kenny Park, Athenry; Referee: John Keane

17 September 2022; 14:00; Round 4	Liam Mellows	1-19 - 0-16	Pádraig Pearse's	Loughrea; Referee: Peter Murphy
17 September 2022; 14:00; Round 4	Adrian Morrissey (0-10, 0-9 frees); Jack Forde (1-1); Jack Hastings (0-2); Ronan Elwood, Kevin Lee, Luke McPhiblin, Tadhg Haran, Conor Kavanagh, Jack Folan (0-1)		Emmet Ward (0-9 frees); Jack Barrett, Tomas Flannery (0-2); Conor Fahey, Dean Reilly, Luke Mitchell (0-1)	Loughrea; Referee: Peter Murphy

17 September 2022; 15:15; Round 4	Portumna	3-21 - 2-16	Mullagh	Duggan Park, Ballinasloe; Referee: Sean Byrne
17 September 2022; 15:15; Round 4	Joe Canning (0-9, 0-5 frees, 0-2 '65s); Martin Tuohy (1-4); Ronan O'Meara (1-2); Jack Canning (1-1); Declan McLoughlin (0-4); Martin Dolphin (0-1)		Ronan Glennon (1-9, 0-7 frees); Davy Glennon (1-2); Damien Monaghan (0-2); Sean Hardiman, Padraig Kennedy, Shane Connaughton (0-1)	Duggan Park, Ballinasloe; Referee: Sean Byrne

17 September 2022; 17:00; Round 4	Ardrahan	2-19 - 1-18	Ahascragh-Fohenagh	Duggan Park, Ballinasloe; Referee: Brian Keon
17 September 2022; 17:00; Round 4	Cianan Fahy (1-10, 0-7 frees); Jason Kennedy (1-1, 0-1 free); Sean Gardiner (0-3); Jack Bourke, Conor Cosgrove, Eoin Murphy, Cian Walsh, Liam Forde (0-1)		Cathal Mannion (1-5, 1-0 penalty, 0-1 free); Mark Kelly (0-6 frees); Noel Ward (0-3); Padraic Mannion (0-2, 0-1 free); Sean Bleahene, Eoghain Delaney (0-1)	Duggan Park, Ballinasloe; Referee: Brian Keon

1 October 2022; 14:45; Round 5	Ahascragh-Fohenagh	0-25 - 2-15	Mullagh	Loughrea; Referee: Brian Keon
1 October 2022; 14:45; Round 5	Mark Kelly (0-9, 0-6 frees); Niall Glynn (0-5); Cathal Mannion (0-3); Sean Bleahene, Padraic Mannion, Eoghain Delaney (0-2); Diarmuid O'Brien, Noel Warde (0-1)		Ronan Gelnnon (0-8, 0-6 frees); Damien Monaghan, Sean Callanan (1-1); Davy Glennon, Cathal Dervan (0-2); Kevin Briscoe (0-1)	Loughrea; Referee: Brian Keon

1 October 2022; 14:45; Round 5	Ardrahan	1-19 - 1-17	Pádraig Pearse's	Kenny Park, Athenry; Referee: Conor Quinlan
1 October 2022; 14:45; Round 5	Cianan Fahy (0-7, 0-5 frees); Jason Kennedy (0-3, 0-1 free); Oisin Slevin (1-0); Darrach Fahy (0-2 frees); Sean Gardiner, Liam Forde (0-2); Cathal Walsh, Ross Albertini, Iarla Tannian (0-1)		Emmet Ward (1-13, 0-9 frees, 0-1 '65); Oisin Flannery, Tomas Flannery, Conor Fahey, Dean Reilly (0-1)	Kenny Park, Athenry; Referee: Conor Quinlan

1 October 2022; 14:45; Round 5	Portumna	2-21 - 1-20	Liam Mellows	Duggan Park, Ballinasloe; Referee: Noel Quinn
1 October 2022; 14:45; Round 5	Joe Canning (0-8, 0-7 frees, 0-1 '65); Declan McLoughlin (1-3); Martin Tuohy (1-0); Martin Dolphin, Ronan O'Meara (0-2); Conor O'Hare, Jack Canning, Neil Conneely, Owen Tracey, Sean Brien, Adam Fogarty (0-1)		Adrian Morrissey (0-9, 0-6 frees); Jack Forde (1-0); Luke McPhiblin, Tadhg Haran, Jack Hastings (0-2); Stephen Barrett, Ronan Elwood, Ryan O'Dwyer, Conor Kavanagh, Conor Hynes (0-1)	Duggan Park, Ballinasloe; Referee: Noel Quinn

==== Senior B – Playoff ====
6 October 2022; 19:30; Senior B – Playoff	Moycullen	2-23 - 5-13	Liam Mellows	Duggan Park, Ballinasloe; Referee: Brian Keon
6 October 2022; 19:30; Senior B – Playoff	James Bradley (0-8, 0-6 frees); Eanna Noone (1-4 frees), Diarmuid Davoren (0-5); Cian Folan (1-1); Niall Mannion, Colm Cunningham (0-2); Cillian Davoren (0-1)		Adrian Morrissey (1-8, 0-4 frees, 1-0 penalty, 0-1 '65); Tadhg Haran (1-3, 0-2 frees); Jack Forde, Darren McPeake (1-1); Ryan O'Dwyer (1-0); Stephen Killeen (0-1)	Duggan Park, Ballinasloe; Referee: Brian Keon

8 October 2022; 14:00; Senior B – Playoff	Ardrahan	0-23 - 1-20 (AET); Ardrahan win 4-2 on penalties	Athenry	Kenny Park, Athenry; Referee: Liam Gordon
8 October 2022; 14:00; Senior B – Playoff	Cianan Fahy (0-9, 0-6 frees); Jason Kennedy (0-3); Darrach Fahy (0-2 frees); Conor Cosgrove, Liam Forde (0-2); Gerard Forde, Pierce McCrann, Cian Walsh, Ross Albertini, Eoin Murphy (0-1)		Donal Parr (0-8, 0-4 frees); Cathal Keane (1-1); Kelvin Langan (0-4); Ronan Hardiman (0-2 frees); Shane Quirke, Cillian Lawless, Paddy Hannon, Noel Keogh, Paddy Rabbitte (0-1)	Kenny Park, Athenry; Referee: Liam Gordon

== Senior Relegation Playoff ==
15 October 2022; 14:15; Relegation	Ahascragh-Fohenagh	1-13 - 1-12	Tynagh-Abbey/Duniry	Loughrea; Referee: Derek Kelly
15 October 2022; 14:15; Relegation	Padraic Mannion (0-5, 0-2 frees); Niall Glynn (1-2); Cathal Mannion (0-3); Mark Kelly (0-2 frees); Robert Green (0-1)		Shane Moloney (1-9, 0-8 frees, 1-0 penalty); Niall Moloney, Johnny Conroy, Ben Moran (0-1)	Loughrea; Referee: Derek Kelly

== Preliminary Quarter-finals ==
15 October 2022; 15:45; Preliminary Quarter-final	Cappataggle	0-17 - 0-10	Moycullen	Pearse Stadium; Referee: Paul Fahy
15 October 2022; 15:45; Preliminary Quarter-final	Daniel Nevin (0-6, 0-5 frees); Liam Collins (0-6, 0-4 frees); Jarlath Mannion (0-3); Paul Claffey, David Malone (0-1)		James Bradley (0-6, 0-3 frees); Eanna Noone (0-2, 0-1 free); Niall Mannion, Cian Folan (0-1)	Pearse Stadium; Referee: Paul Fahy

15 October 2022; 15:45; Preliminary Quarter-final	Portumna	2-10 - 0-13	Craughwell	Loughrea; Referee: Karol Collins
15 October 2022; 15:45; Preliminary Quarter-final	Joe Canning (1-8, 0-7 frees); Ronan O'Meara (1-1); Declan McLoughlin (0-1)	Report	Adrian Prendergast (0-6, 0-5 frees); Thomas Monaghan (0-5, 0-2 frees); Dean Callanan (0-2)	Loughrea; Referee: Karol Collins

16 October 2022; 13:45; Preliminary Quarter-final	Clarinbridge	1-18 - 1-11	Ardrahan	Kenny Park, Athenry; Referee: Shane Hynes
16 October 2022; 13:45; Preliminary Quarter-final	Evan Niland (0-13, 0-7 frees, 0-1 '65); Gavin Lee (0-3); Cian Salmon (1-0); Mike Daly, Alan Armstrong (0-1)		Cianan Fahy (0-10 frees); Iarla Tannian (1-0); Liam Forde (0-1)	Kenny Park, Athenry; Referee: Shane Hynes

16 October 2022; 15:45; Preliminary Quarter-final	Turloughmore	2-13 - 0-11	Oranmore-Maree	Kenny Park, Athenry; Referee: Christopher Browne
16 October 2022; 15:45; Preliminary Quarter-final	Tom Quirke (1-2); Dara Whelan, Sean O'Hanlon (0-4); Sean Loftus (0-4 frees); Fergal Moore (1-0)		Niall Burke (0-8, 0-5 frees); Gearoid McInerney (0-1 free); Diarmuid Hanniffy, J Grealish (0-1)	Kenny Park, Athenry; Referee: Christopher Browne

== Quarter-finals ==
29 October 2022; 13:00; Quarter-final	Clarinbridge	3-12 - 0-15	Tommy Larkin's	Kenny Park, Athenry; Referee: Paul Fahy
29 October 2022; 13:00; Quarter-final	Evan Niland (0-6 frees); Gavin Lee (1-1); Mark Kennedy (1-1, 1-0 penalty); TJ Brennan (1-0); Niall Armstrong (0-3); P Foley (0-1)		Jason Flynn (0-5, 0-4 frees); Eanna Murphy (0-2 frees); Colm Flynn, Cian Duggan, Ronan Murphy (0-2); Eoghan Nevin, Kevin McHugo (0-1)	Kenny Park, Athenry; Referee: Paul Fahy

29 October 2022; 13:45; Quarter-final	St. Thomas'	1-19 - 0-16	Cappataggle	Kenny Park, Athenry; Referee: John Keane
29 October 2022; 13:45; Quarter-final	Conor Cooney (0-8, 0-7 frees); Bernard Burke (1-0); Darragh Burke (0-3); Cathal Burke, Eanna Burke (0-2); Evan Duggan, John Headd, Oisin Flannery, James Regan (0-1)		Liam Collins (0-11, 0-9 frees, 0-1 '65); Dan Nevin (0-2, 0-1 frees); Darragh Dolan, Oisin Finn, Niall Collins (0-1)	Kenny Park, Athenry; Referee: John Keane

30 October 2022; 12:15; Quarter-final	Sarsfields	1-19 - 0-16	Portumna	Duggan Park, Ballinasloe; Referee: Derek Kelly
30 October 2022; 12:15; Quarter-final	Niall Morrissey (0-12, 0-9 frees, 0-1 '65); Mark O'Regan (1-0); Niall Quinn, Alex Connaire, Darren Murphy (0-2); Joeseph Cooney (0-1 free); Kenneth Cooney (0-1)		Joe Canning (0-10, 0-7 frees, 0-1 sideline); Adam Fogarty (0-2); Conor Goode, Jack Canning, Ronan O'Meara, Jamie Hogan (0-1)	Duggan Park, Ballinasloe; Referee: Derek Kelly

30 October 2022; 14:00; Quarter-final	Loughrea	1-22 - 2-16	Turloughmore	Duggan Park, Ballinasloe; Referee: Brian Keon
30 October 2022; 14:00; Quarter-final	Neil Keary (0-8, 0-4 frees, 0-1 '65); Jamie Ryan (0-5); Johnny Coen (1-1, 1-0 penalty); Martin McManus (0-4); Anthony Burns (0-3); Dylan Shaughnessy (0-1)		Jamie Holland (1-2); Sean Loftus (0-5 frees); Sean O'Hanlon (0-4); Daithi Burke (1-0); Mark Murphy, Sean Linnane, Fergal Moore, Barry Callanan, Aaron O'Shaughnessy (0-1)	Duggan Park, Ballinasloe; Referee: Brian Keon

== Semi-finals ==
6 November 2022; 12:30; Semi-final	St. Thomas'	2-19 - 0-15	Sarsfields	Pearse Stadium; Referee: Liam Gordon
6 November 2022; 12:30; Semi-final	Conor Cooney (0-10, 0-5 frees); Victor Manso, Eanna Burke (1-1); Oisin Flannery (0-3); David Burke, Darragh Burke (0-2)	Report	Niall Morrissey (0-6, 0-5 frees); Darren Murphy (0-3); Kevin Cooney (0-2); Joseph Cooney (0-1 free); Alex Connaire, Ian Fox, John Cooney (0-1)	Pearse Stadium; Referee: Liam Gordon

6 November 2022; 14:15; Semi-final	Loughrea	3-13 - 0-16	Clarinbridge	Pearse Stadium; Referee: Conor Quinlan
6 November 2022; 14:15; Semi-final	Martin McManus (2-2), Neil Keary (0-5, 0-4 frees); Joe Mooney (1-1); Tiernan Killeen (0-2); Ian Hanrahan, Anthony Burns, Dylan Shaughnessy (0-1)	Report	Evan Niland (0-14, 0-10 frees, 0-1 '65); Mark Kennedy, Niall Armstrong (0-1)	Pearse Stadium; Referee: Conor Quinlan

== Final ==
20 November 2022; 13:30; Final	St. Thomas'	1-17 - 0-20	Loughrea	Pearse Stadium; Referee: Shane Hynes
20 November 2022; 13:30; Final	Conor Cooney (0-9, 0-8 frees); Éanna Burke (1-4); Darragh Burke (0-2); Victor Monso, Oisin Flannery (0-1)	Report	Neil Keary (0-9, 0-8 frees); Martin McManus (0-4); Ian Hanrahan (0-2); Oisin Coyle, Dylan Shaughnessy, Joe Mooney, Jamie Ryan, Tiernan Killeen (0-1)	Pearse Stadium; Referee: Shane Hynes

St. Thomas':
1	Gerald Kelly
2	Cian Mahoney
3	Fintan Burke
7	Cathal Burke
5	Evan Duggan
4	John Headd
6	Mark Caulfield
8	Bernard Burke
9	David Burke
20	Victor Manso
11	Conor Cooney
10	Darragh Burke
12	Damian McGlynn
13	Eanna Burke
15	Oisin Flannery
Substitutes Used:
18	Shane Cooney for Mark Caulfield (30 mins)
19	Brendan Farrell for Victor Manso (46 mins)
17	Conor Headd for John Headd (58 mins)
21	Damien Finnerty for Bernard Burke (60+2 mins)
Manager:
Kenneth Burke

Loughrea:
1	Gearoid Loughnane
9	Johnny Coen
3	Paul Hoban
4	Kieran Hanrahan
8	Ian Hanrahan
7	Oisin Coyle
20	Brian Keary
14	Jamie Ryan
12	Tiernan Killeen
23	Darren Shaughnessy
25	Dylan Shaughnessy
21	Anthony Burns
10	Neil Keary
13	Martin McManus
11	Joe Mooney
Substitutes Used:
6	Sean Sweeney for Ian Hanrahan (58 mins)
5	Caimin Killeen for Dylan Shaughnessy (60+1 minutes)
15	Shane O’Brien for Anthony Burns (60+1 minutes)
Manager:
Tommy Kelly

=== Replay ===
27 November 2022; 13:00; Final Replay	St. Thomas'	1-15 - 0-17	Loughrea	Pearse Stadium; Referee: John McDonagh
27 November 2022; 13:00; Final Replay	Mark Caulfield (1-3); Conor Cooney (0-4, 0-3 frees); Éanna Burke (0-2); Bernard Burke, John Headd, Darragh Burke, Victor Manso, Cathal Burke, Oisín Flannery	Report	Neil Keary (0-5, 0-4 frees); Jamie Ryan (0-4, 0-2 frees); Tiernan Killeen (0-3); Martin McManus (0-2); Joe Mooney, Caimín Killeen, Darren Shaughnessy	Pearse Stadium; Referee: John McDonagh

St. Thomas':
1	Gerald Kelly
5	Evan Duggan
3	Fintan Burke
2	Cian Mahoney
7	Cathal Burke
9	David Burke
4	John Headd
8	Bernard Burke
10	Darragh Burke
20	Victor Manso
11	Conor Cooney
6	Mark Caulfield
12	Damian McGlynn
15	Oisin Flannery
13	Eanna Burke
Substitutes Used:
19	Brendan Farrell for Bernard Burke (54 mins)
17	Conor Headd for Victor Manso (56 mins)
Manager:
Kenneth Burke

Loughrea:
1	Gearoid Loughnane
3	Paul Hoban
4	Kieran Hanrahan
9	Johnny Coen
23	Darren Shaughnessy
8	Ian Hanrahan
20	Brian Keary
7	Oisin Coyle
12	Tiernan Killeen
10	Neil Keary
25	Dylan Shaughnessy
21	Anthony Burns
13	Martin McManus
11	Joe Mooney
14	Jamie Ryan
Substitutes Used:
5	Caimin Killeen for Brian Keary (33 minutes)
15	Shane O’Brien for Dylan Shaughnessy (39 minutes)
22	Tom Hoban for Anthony Burns (58 mins)
Manager:
Tommy Kelly
