= 2023 Galway Senior Hurling Championship =

Annual hurling competition season

Tournament details
- County: Galway
- Year: 2023
- Sponsor: Brooks

Winners
- Champions: St. Thomas' (7th win)
- Manager: Kenneth Burke
- Captain: Conor Cooney

Promotion/Relegation
- Relegated team(s): Killimor

The 2023 Galway Senior Hurling Championship was the 126th staging of the Galway Senior Hurling Championship since its establishment in 1887.

Killimor participated in the senior championship after having beaten Meelick Eyrecourt in the 2022 Galway Intermediate Hurling Championship. The competition was sponsored by Brooks for their fourth year of a partnership that started in 2020.

On 29 October, St. Thomas' retained the title after a 2-12 to 1-13 win against Turloughmore in the final. It was the 6th title in a row for St Thomas's.

== Competition format ==
Twenty four teams will compete; 16 in Senior A and 8 in Senior B. The teams in Senior A play for the championship. The teams in Senior B play for promotion to Senior A in 2024 at the expense of the relegated Senior A team. A team will also be relegated from Senior B to play in the 2024 Intermediate Championship.

== Senior A ==
=== Group stage ===
Senior A consists of 16 teams divided into four groups of 4 teams.

- The top teams in each group progress directly to the Quarter-Finals
- The 2nd and 3rd placed teams qualify for the Preliminary Quarter-Finals
- The bottom teams will play off with the loser relegated to Senior B for 2024

==== Senior A – Group 1 ====
Pos	Team	Pld	W	D	L	SF	SA	Diff	Pts
1	Oranmore-Maree	3	2	0	1	4–60	4–47	13	4
2	Clarinbridge	3	2	0	1	3–54	3–44	7	4
3	Killimordaly	3	2	0	1	3–53	1–58	1	4
4	Tommy Larkin's	3	0	0	3	1–46	2–64	-21	0

5 August 2023; 18:45; Round 1	Clarinbridge	3-15 - 1-17	Oranmore-Maree	Kenny Park, Athenry; Referee: Liam Gordon
5 August 2023; 18:45; Round 1	Mark Kennedy (3-3); Evan Niland (0-5, 0-3 frees, 0-1 '65); Gavin Lee(0-2); TJ Brennan, Mikey Daly, Niall Armstrong, Joshua Ryan (0-1)		Niall Burke (0-8, 0-6 frees); Marcus Quinn (1-1); Rory Burke (0-2, 0-1 free); Gearoid McInerney, Mark Hanniffy, Patrick Burke, Evan O'Rourke, Ruben Davitt, Diarmuid Hanniffy (0-1)	Kenny Park, Athenry; Referee: Liam Gordon

6 August 2023; 17:15; Round 1	Killimordaly	0-23 - 0-17	Tommy Larkin's	Duggan Park; Referee: Sean Byrne
6 August 2023; 17:15; Round 1	Brian Burke (0-14, 0-11 frees, 0-1 '65); Luke Lynskey (0-4); Paul Craven (0-2); David Concannon, Jack Fitzpatrick, Brian Concannon (0-1)		David Hickey (0-7, 0-4 frees, 0-1 '65); Conor Gardiner (0-3); Eanna Murphy, Conor Slattery (0-2), Cian Daniels, Kevin McHugo, Cian Duggan (0-1)	Duggan Park; Referee: Sean Byrne

19 August 2023; 18:15; Round 2	Killimordaly	2-15 - 0-19	Clarinbridge	Kenny Park, Athenry; Referee: Derek Kelly
19 August 2023; 18:15; Round 2	Brian Burke (0-9, 0-8 frees); Brian Concannon (0-4); Shane Monaghan, Luke Lynskey (1-0); Jack Fitzpatrick, Darren Daly (0-1)		Evan Niland (0-11, 0-7 frees, 0-1 '65); David Lee, Gavin Lee (0-2); Mikey Daly (0-2, 0-1 '65); Liam Leen, Cian Salmon (0-1)	Kenny Park, Athenry; Referee: Derek Kelly

19 August 2023; 18:15; Round 2	Oranmore-Maree	2-21 - 0-17	Tommy Larkin's	Duggan Park; Referee: Conor Quinlan
19 August 2023; 18:15; Round 2	Niall Burke (0-11, 0-6 frees, 0-2 '65s); Rory Burke (2-1); Anthony Keady, Evan O'Rourke, Conor Hanniffy (0-2); Gearoid McInerney, Ross Malone, Ruben Davitt (0-1)		David Hickey (0-4 frees); Conor Slattery (0-3); Cian Daniels, Conor Gardiner (0-2); Darren Duggan, Kevin McHugo, Cian Duggan, Ronan Murphy, Adrian Moran (0-1)	Duggan Park; Referee: Conor Quinlan

3 September 2023; 16:00; Round 3	Oranmore-Maree	1-22 - 1-15	Killimordaly	Gort; Referee: Liam Gordon
3 September 2023; 16:00; Round 3	Rory Burke (0-10, 0-4 frees, 0-1 '65); Niall Burke (1-2, 0-1 free); Patrick Burke (0-3); Ruben Davitt, Evan O'Rourke (0-2); Ross Malone, Anthony Keady, Simon Dunne (0-1)		Brian Burke (0-5, 0-4 frees); Brian Concannon (0-4); Paul Creaven, Shane Monaghan (0-2); Aaron McDonagh, Darren Daly, Jack Fitzpatrick (0-1)	Gort; Referee: Liam Gordon

3 September 2023; 16:00; Round 3	Clarinbridge	0-20 - 1-12	Tommy Larkin's	Duggan Park; Referee: Christopher Browne
3 September 2023; 16:00; Round 3	Evan Niland (0-16, 0-12 frees, 0-1 '65); Shane Ryan, Liam Leen, Gavin Lee, Joshua Ryan (0-1)		David Hickey (0-7, 0-6 frees, 0-1 '65); Cian Duggan (1-0); Eanna Murphy (0-2 frees); Cathal Tuohy, Colm Flynn, Ronan Murphy (0-1)	Duggan Park; Referee: Christopher Browne

==== Senior A – Group 2 ====
Pos	Team	Pld	W	D	L	SF	SA	Diff	Pts
1	St Thomas's	3	3	0	0	5–77	3–45	38	6
3	Gort	3	1	1	1	6–54	3–61	2	3
2	Turloughmore	3	1	1	1	3–56	1–52	10	3
4	Portumna	3	0	0	3	3–50	10–79	-50	0

4 August 2023; 19:30; Round 1	Turloughmore	2-26 - 0-17	Portumna	Duggan Park; Referee: Christopher Browne
4 August 2023; 19:30; Round 1	Conor Walsh (0-11, 0-7 frees, 0-1 '65); Conor Shaughnessy (1-2); Brendan Phelan (1-1); Dara Whelan (0-3); Barry McDonagh, Sean Linnane, Tom Quirke, Sean O'Hanlon (0-2); Darragh Burke (0-1)		Joe Canning (0-9, 0-5 frees); A Fogarty (0-4, 0-3 frees); Martin Tuohy (0-2); Declan McLoughlin, Donal Donoghue (0-1)	Duggan Park; Referee: Christopher Browne

6 August 2023; 13:45; Round 1	St Thomas's	2-23 - 0-20	Gort	Kenny Park, Athenry; Referee: Conor Quinlan
6 August 2023; 13:45; Round 1	Conor Cooney (1-10, 0-6 frees); Éanna Burke (0-5); Victor Manso (1-0); Fintan Burke, Evan Duggan, Shane Cooney, James Regan, Damien Finnerty, David Burke, Damien McGlynn, Oisin Flannery (0-1)		Paddy Commins (0-9, 0-4 frees, 0-1 sideline); Ben O'Donovan, Aiden Helebert (0-4); Nathan Gill, Kaelen Higgins, Richie Cummins (0-1)	Kenny Park, Athenry; Referee: Conor Quinlan

18 August 2023; 19:00; Round 2	Turloughmore	0-15 - 1-12	Gort	Kenny Park, Athenry; Referee: Alan Kelly
18 August 2023; 19:00; Round 2	Conor Walsh (0-3 frees); Sean Linnane (0-3); Barry McDonagh (0-2); Cillian Whelan, Daniel Loftus, Dara Whelan, Tom Quirke, Sean O'Hanlon, Conor Shaughnessy, Cillian Travers (0-1)		Paddy Commins (1-7, 0-6 frees); Aiden Helebert (0-3); Richie Cummins, Gavin Deeley (0-1)	Kenny Park, Athenry; Referee: Alan Kelly

20 August 2023; 13:30; Round 2	St Thomas's	3-31 - 2-10	Portumna	Loughrea; Referee: Brian Keon
20 August 2023; 13:30; Round 2	Conor Cooney (0-13, 0-8 frees); Eanna Burke (2-4); Victor Manso, Oisin Flannery (0-4); Damian McGlynn (1-0); Darragh Burke (0-2); Gerald Kelly (0-1 free); James Regan, Damien Finnerty, Darren Farrell (0-1)		Joe Canning (2-4, 1-0 penalty, 0-3 frees); Martin Tuohy (0-2); Martin Dolphin, Declan McLoughlin, Donal Donoghue, David O'Meara (0-1)	Loughrea; Referee: Brian Keon

2 September 2023; 17:45; Round 3	Gort	5-22 - 1-23	Portumna	Loughrea; Referee: Karol Collins
2 September 2023; 17:45; Round 3	Paddy Commins (0-7, 0-1 free); Jason Gralish (0-5); Aiden Helebert (1-2); Greg Lally (1-1, 1-0 penalty); Richie Cummins (0-3); Jason O'Donoghue, Caoimhin Marren (0-2); Ben O'Donovan, Jack Grealish, Lorcan Walsh (0-1)		Joe Canning (0-9, 0-3 frees, 0-2 '65s); Adam Fogarty (0-6); Jack Canning (1-2); Declan McLoughlin (0-3); Conor Goode (0-2); Sean Brien (0-1)	Loughrea; Referee: Karol Collins

2 September 2023; 17:45; Round 3	St Thomas's	0-23 - 1-15	Turloughmore	Duggan Park; Referee: Shane Hynes
2 September 2023; 17:45; Round 3	Conor Cooney (0-10, 0-7 frees); Eanna Burke (0-5, 0-1 sideline); Darragh Burke (0-3); Victor Manso (0-2); James Regan, Oisin Flannery, Damian McGlynn (0-1)		Conor Walsh (0-9, 0-8 frees); Daithi Burke (1-1, 0-1 free); Sean O'Hanlon (0-3); Daniel Loftus (0-2)	Duggan Park; Referee: Shane Hynes

==== Senior A – Group 3 ====
Pos	Team	Pld	W	D	L	SF	SA	Diff	Pts
1	Loughrea	3	3	0	0	9–72	0–40	59	6
2	Cappataggle	3	1	0	2	3–54	2–70	3	2
3	Moycullen	3	1	0	2	2–54	7–60	-23	2
4	Kilconieron	3	1	0	2	2–52	6–45	-23	2

5 August 2023; 18:15; Round 1	Loughrea	4-26 - 0-14	Moycullen	Pearse Stadium; Referee: Karol Collins
5 August 2023; 18:15; Round 1	Neil Keary (0-8, 0-3 frees); Anthony Burns, Joe Mooney (2-2); Ian Hanrahan (0-4); Shane Morgan, Darren Shaughnessy (0-3); Jamie Ryan (0-3, 0-1 free); Brian Keary (0-1)		James Bradley (0-9, 0-4 frees, 0-1 '65); Niall Mannion (0-2); Colm Cunningham, Éanna Noone, Cian Folan (0-1)	Pearse Stadium; Referee: Karol Collins

6 August 2023; 15:30; Round 1	Cappataggle	2-23 - 0-23	Kilconieron	Duggan Park; Referee: Brian Keon
6 August 2023; 15:30; Round 1	Niall Collins (0-11, 0-7 frees, 0-1 '65); Liam Collins (1-4, 1-0 penalty); Jarlath Mannion (0-5); Oisin Finn (1-0); Alan Dolan (0-2); James Egan (0-1)		Shane Caulfield (0-10, 0-5 frees, 0-2 '65s); Sean Connaughton (0-5, 0-1 free); Ian McGlynn (0-3, 0-1 sideline); Sean Burke (0-2); Daniel Keane, Colin Curley (0-1); Ultan McGlynn (0-1 sideline)	Duggan Park; Referee: Brian Keon

19 August 2023; 16:30; Round 2	Loughrea	1-24 - 0-13	Cappataggle	Kenny Park, Athenry; Referee: John Keane
19 August 2023; 16:30; Round 2	Neil Keary (0-8, 0-7 frees); Jamie Ryan (0-7, 0-3 frees); Anthony Burns (1-1); Joe Mooney (0-4); Shane Morgan, Brian Keary, Johnny Coen, Dylan Shaughnessy (0-1)		Niall Collins (0-8, 0-7 frees); Oisin Finn, Ronan Garvey (0-2); Jarlath Mannion (0-1)	Kenny Park, Athenry; Referee: John Keane

19 August 2023; 17:45; Round 2	Kilconieron	2-16 - 1-15	Moycullen	Pearse Stadium; Referee: Sean Byrne
19 August 2023; 17:45; Round 2	Shane Caulfield (0-10 frees); Jack Walsh (1-3); Ian McGlynn (1-0); Sean Burke, Niall Dillon (0-1); Sean Connaughton (0-1 free)		James Bradley (0-8 frees); Cian Folan (1-2); Diarmuid Davoren, Colm Cunningham (0-2); Anraoi Whyte (0-1)	Pearse Stadium; Referee: Sean Byrne

3 September 2023; 12:00; Round 3	Moycullen	1-23 - 1-18	Cappataggle	Kilbacanty; Referee: Noel Quinn
3 September 2023; 12:00; Round 3	James Bradley (0-8, 0-5 frees); Eanna Noone (0-6); Anraoi Whyte (0-3); Cian Folan (1-0); Niall Fitzgerald (0-2); Daire Davoren, Evan Kenny, Colm Cunningham, Diarmuid Davoren (0-1)		Niall Collins (0-11, 0-10 frees); Darragh Dolan (1-0); Michael Garvey, Liam Collins (0-2); Oisin Finn, Ronan Garvey, Jarlath Mannion (0-1)	Kilbacanty; Referee: Noel Quinn

3 September 2023; 12:00; Round 3	Loughrea	4-22 - 0-13	Kilconieron	New Inn; Referee: Kerril Wade
3 September 2023; 12:00; Round 3	Darren Shaughnessy (2-1); Neil Keary (0-5, 0-4 frees); Jamie Ryan (0-5, 0-4 frees); Joe Mooney (0-4); Johnny Coen (1-0 penalty); Martin McManus (0-3); Dylan Shaughnessy, Ian Hanrahan (1-0); Tienan Killeen, Shane O'Brien, Tom Hoban (0-1)		Shane Caulfield (0-6, 0-5 frees); Sean Connaughton (0-3, 0-1 free, 0-1 '65); Colin Curley (0-2); Jack Walsh (0-1)	New Inn; Referee: Kerril Wade

==== Senior A – Group 4 ====
Pos	Team	Pld	W	D	L	SF	SA	Diff	Pts
1	Castlegar	3	2	0	1	3–62	6–52	1	4
2	Sarsfields	3	2	0	1	3–55	3–51	7	4
3	Ardrahan	3	1	1	1	2–61	3–57	1	3
4	Craughwell	3	0	1	2	6–50	2–71	-9	1

5 August 2023; 17:00; Round 1	Ardrahan	1-24 - 1-20	Castlegar	Kenny Park, Athenry; Referee: John Keane
5 August 2023; 17:00; Round 1	Jason Kennedy (0-12, 0-9 frees, 0-2 '65); Liam Forde (1-1); Ben O'Connor (0-3); Ross Albertini, Iarla Tannian (0-2); Darach Fahy (0-1 free); Eoin Murphy, Oisin Slevin, Jonathan Glynn (0-1)		Ger Farragher (0-11, 0-10 frees); Jack Coyne (1-1); Greg Thomas (0-3); Darragh Neary (0-2); Donal Barry, Simon Thomas, Oisin Connolly (0-1)	Kenny Park, Athenry; Referee: John Keane

12 August 2023; 17:00; Round 1	Sarsfields	1-23 - 1-17	Craughwell	Duggan Park; Referee: Christopher Browne
12 August 2023; 17:00; Round 1	Kevin Cooney (1-8, 0-5 frees); Ian Fox, Paddy Mac Carthaigh (0-3); Joseph Cooney, Adam Donoghue (0-2, 0-1 free); Darragh Donoghue (0-2); John Cosgrove, Niall Morrissey, Jeffrey Lawless (0-1)		Adrian Prendergast (0-8, 0-7 frees); Tiernan Leen (1-3, 0-1 free); Patrick Monaghan, Thomas Monaghan (0-3)	Duggan Park; Referee: Christopher Browne

20 August 2023; 15:30; Round 2	Ardrahan	0-22 - 1-19	Craughwell	Kenny Park, Athenry; Referee: Liam Gordon
20 August 2023; 15:30; Round 2	Jason Kennedy (0-8, 0-4 frees, 0-1 '65); Ben O'Connor (0-3); Cianan Fahy, Iarla Tannian, Liam Forde (0-2); Cian Walsh, Oisin Slevin, Pearse McCrann, Eoin Murphy, Ross Albertini (0-1)		Adrian Prendergast (1-9, 0-7 frees); Thomas Monaghan (0-5); Patrick Monaghan, Ryan Howley (0-2); Jamie Ryan (0-1)	Kenny Park, Athenry; Referee: Liam Gordon

20 August 2023; 17:15; Round 2	Castlegar	1-16 - 1-14	Sarsfields	Kenny Park, Athenry; Referee: Shane Hynes
20 August 2023; 17:15; Round 2	Ger Farragher (0-10, 0-5 frees, 0-2 '65); Cillan Callaghan (1-0); Darragh Neary, Greg Thomas (0-2); Donal Barry, Oisin Connolly (0-1)		Kevin Cooney (1-4 frees); John Cosgrove (0-3); Niall Morrissey (0-3, 0-2 frees, 0-1 '65); Niall Quinn, Ian Fox, Kenneth Cooney, Paddy Mac Cárthaígh (0-1)	Kenny Park, Athenry; Referee: Shane Hynes

3 September 2023; 14:15; Round 3	Sarsfields	1-18 - 1-15	Ardrahan	Duggan Park; Referee: Conor Quinlan
3 September 2023; 14:15; Round 3	Kevin Cooney (1-6, 0-5f, 0-1 sideline); Alex Connaire (1-3); Paddy Mac Cárthaigh, Darren Murphy (0-2); Darren Morrissey, John Cooney, Ian Fox (0-1); Niall Morrissey, Jeffrey Lawless (0-1 free)		Jason Kennedy (0-6, 0-5 frees, 0-1 '65); Darach Fahy (1-1, 0-1 free, 1-0 penalty); Johnny Glynn (1-1); Donagh Fahy (0-2); Cian Walsh, Eoin Murphy, Oisin Slevin, Ben O'Connor (0-1)	Duggan Park; Referee: Conor Quinlan

5 September 2023; 19:30; Round 3	Castlegar	1-26 - 4-14	Craughwell	Duggan Park; Referee: Christopher Browne
5 September 2023; 19:30; Round 3	Ger Farragher (0-16, 0-12 frees, 0-1 '65, 0-1 sideline); G Thomas (1-3); Oisin Connolly (0-3); Jack Coyne (0-2); Donal Barry, Dean Higgins (0-1)	Report	Adrian Prendergast (2-5, 1-0 penalty, 0-3 frees); Jamie Ryan (1-2); Sean Gilligan (1-0); Thomas Monaghan (0-3); Patrick Monaghan (0-2); Tiernan Leen (0-2, 0-1 free)	Duggan Park; Referee: Christopher Browne

=== Senior A – Relegation ===
==== Senior A – Relegation Semi-finals ====
16 September 2023; 14:30; Senior A – Relegation Semi-final	Tommy Larkin's	2-21 - 2-12	Portumna	Loughrea; Referee: Alan Kelly
16 September 2023; 14:30; Senior A – Relegation Semi-final	Cian Duggan (1-4); Jason Flynn (1-3, 0-2 frees); Conor Gardiner, David Hickey (0-3); Adrian Moran (0-3 frees); Eanna Murphy (0-1 free); Cian Daniels, Conor Hanley, Keith Dervan, Conor Slattery (0-1)		Joe Canning (1-9, 0-8 frees); Declan McLoughlin (1-1); Martin Tuohy, Adam Fogarty (0-1)	Loughrea; Referee: Alan Kelly

17 September 2023; 12:00; Senior A – Relegation Semi-final	Kilconieron	2-17 - 1-20	Craughwell	Loughrea; Referee: Brian Keon
17 September 2023; 12:00; Senior A – Relegation Semi-final	Shane Caulfield (0-9, 0-8 frees, 0-1 '65); Sean Burke, Sean Connaughton (1-1); Keith Burke (0-2 frees); Ian McGlynn (0-2); Colin Curley, Niall Dillon (0-1)		Adrian Prendergast (0-11 frees); Thomas Monaghan (0-4, 0-1 '65); Shaun Gilligan (1-0); Tiernan Leen (0-2, 0-1 free); Patrick Monaghan (0-2); John Greaney (0-1)	Loughrea; Referee: Brian Keon

24 September 2023; 14:00; Senior A – Relegation Semi-final Replay	Craughwell	1-15 - 0-14	Kilconieron	New Inn
24 September 2023; 14:00; Senior A – Relegation Semi-final Replay	Thomas Monaghan (0-5, 0-3 frees); Shaun Gilligan (1-2); Adrian Prendergast (0-2 frees); John Greaney, Tiernan Leen (0-2); Adam Stewart, Adam Clarke (0-1)		Shane Caulfield (0-12, 0-11 frees); Brian Hickey, Sean Connaughton (0-1)	New Inn

==== Senior A – Relegation Final ====
14 October 2023; 15:30; Senior A – Relegation Final	Kilconieron	1-20 - 0-13	Portumna	Kilbacanty; Referee: Noel Quinn
14 October 2023; 15:30; Senior A – Relegation Final	Shane Caulfield (0-10, 0-8 frees); Sean Connaughton (1-1); Brian Hickey, Jack Walsh (0-3); Paddy Regan, Ian McGlynn, Sean Burke (0-1)		Joe Canning (0-6 frees); Declan McLoughlin (0-3); Andy Smyth, Neil Connelley, Adam Fogarty, Adam Canning (0-1)	Kilbacanty; Referee: Noel Quinn

=== Senior A – Preliminary Quarterfinals ===
16 September 2023; 14:30; Senior A – Preliminary Quarterfinal	Turloughmore	0-22 - 0-14	Moycullen	Pearse Stadium; Referee: Derek Kelly
16 September 2023; 14:30; Senior A – Preliminary Quarterfinal	Conor Walsh (0-7, 0-6 frees, 0-1 '65); Sean O'Hanlon (0-4); Sean Linnane, Jamie Holland (0-2); Dara Whelan, B Callanan, Matthew Tarpey, K Hussey, Barry McDonagh (0-1)		James Bradley (0-8, 0-6 frees); Niall Fitzgerald, Eanna Noone, Cian Folan, Diarmuid Davoren, Fionn McDonagh (0-1)	Pearse Stadium; Referee: Derek Kelly

16 September 2023; 16:15; Senior A – Preliminary Quarterfinal	Clarinbridge	2-20 - 2-16	Ardrahan	Pearse Stadium; Referee: John Keane
16 September 2023; 16:15; Senior A – Preliminary Quarterfinal	Evan Niland (0-12, 0-11 frees); Joshua Ryan (1-3); Cian Salmon (1-0); Gavin Lee (0-2); Oisin Salmon, Liam Leen, Sean Kilduff (0-1)		Jason Kennedy (1-6, 0-6 frees); Darach Fahy (1-2, 1-0 penalty, 0-2 frees); Oisin Slevin (0-2); Cian Walsh, Cianan Fahy, Iarla Tannian, Ben O'Connor, Cathal Walshe (0-1); C Cosgrove (0-1 free)	Pearse Stadium; Referee: John Keane

17 September 2023; 14:30; Senior A – Preliminary Quarterfinal	Cappataggle	4-23 - 2-18	Gort	Duggan Park; Referee: Liam Gordon
17 September 2023; 14:30; Senior A – Preliminary Quarterfinal	Niall Collins (1-8, 0-6 frees); Liam Collins (1-5); Oran Finn (1-2); Lewis Coughlan (1-0); Jarlath Mannion (0-3); D Malone (0-2); Declan Cronin, Daragh Dolan (0-1); Michael Garvey (0-1 free)		Paddy Commins (1-13, 0-11 frees, 0-1 '65); Richie Cummins (1-1); Jason Grealish, Gavin Deely, Caoimhin Marren, Aiden Helebert (0-1)	Duggan Park; Referee: Liam Gordon

17 September 2023; 16:15; Senior A – Preliminary Quarterfinal	Sarsfields	3-27 - 1-18	Killimordaly	Duggan Park
17 September 2023; 16:15; Senior A – Preliminary Quarterfinal	Kevin Cooney (2-11, 0-9 frees, 1-0 penalty); Alex Connaire (0-4); Ian Fox, Paddy Mac Cathaigh (0-3); John Cosgove (1-0); Joseph Cooney, Cathal Dillon, John Cooney, Jeffrey Lawless, Kenneth Cooney, Niall Morrissey (0-1)		Brian Burke (0-9 frees); Brian Concannon (1-2); Paul Creaven (0-4); Darren Daly (0-2); Luke Lynskey (0-1)	Duggan Park

=== Senior A – Quarterfinals ===
30 September 2023; 14:30; Senior A – Quarterfinal	Turloughmore	2-20 - 1-14	Castlegar	Pearse Stadium; Referee: Shane Hynes
30 September 2023; 14:30; Senior A – Quarterfinal	Conor Walsh (0-8, 0-7 frees); Sean O'Hanlon (0-5); Jamie Holland (1-1); Mark Murphy, Dara Whelan, Cillian Whelan, Brendan Phelan, Brion Connolly, Tom Quirke (0-1); Daithi Burke (0-1 free)		Ger Farragher (0-8, 0-4 frees, 0-4 sidelines); Simon Thomas (1-1); Des Hynes, Oisin Connolly, Jack Coyne, Greg Thomas, Cillian Callaghan (0-1)	Pearse Stadium; Referee: Shane Hynes

30 September 2023; 16:15; Senior A – Quarterfinal	St Thomas's	2-19 - 0-12	Cappataggle	Pearse Stadium; Referee: John Keane
30 September 2023; 16:15; Senior A – Quarterfinal	Conor Cooney (0-9, 0-5 frees); Oisin Flannery (1-1); Eanna Burke (0-4); Victor Manso (0-3); Darren Farrell (1-0); Shane Cooney, Damien McGlynn (0-1)		Cian Bowes (0-6 frees); Michael Garvey (0-2 frees); Liam Collins, Jarlath Mannion (0-1); Niall Collins (0-1 sideline)	Pearse Stadium; Referee: John Keane

1 October 2023; 14:00; Senior A – Quarterfinal	Loughrea	1-21 - 2-16	Clarinbridge	Pearse Stadium; Referee: Liam Gordon
1 October 2023; 14:00; Senior A – Quarterfinal	Jamie Ryan (0-11, 0-8 frees, 0-1 sideline); Martin McManus (1-2); Ian Hanrahan (0-2); Caimin Killeen, Brian Keary, Tiernan Killeen, Shane O'Brien, Darren Shaughnessy, Joe Mooney (0-1)		Evan Niland (1-10, 1-7 frees); Joshua Ryan (1-1); Gavin Lee (0-2); Shane Ryan, Liam Leen, Mikey Daly (0-1)	Pearse Stadium; Referee: Liam Gordon

1 October 2023; 15:45; Senior A – Quarterfinal	Sarsfields	3-24 - 0-12	Oranmore-Maree	Pearse Stadium; Referee: Derek Kelly
1 October 2023; 15:45; Senior A – Quarterfinal	Kevin Cooney (2-11, 0-7 frees, 0-1 '65); Darren Murphy (1-0); Adam Donoghue (0-3); Ian Fox, Alex Connaire (0-2); Darragh Donoghue, John Cooney, Paddy Mac Carthaigh, John Cosgrove, Kenneth Cooney, Alan Ward (0-1)		Niall Burke (0-5, 0-4 frees); Ruben Davitt (0-3, 0-1 sideline); R Carr (0-2); Jack Grealish, Evan O'Rourke (0-1)	Pearse Stadium; Referee: Derek Kelly

=== Senior A – Semifinals ===
15 October 2023; 13:45; Senior A – Semifinal	Turloughmore	2-22 - 1-22	Loughrea	Pearse Stadium; Referee: Shane Hynes
15 October 2023; 13:45; Senior A – Semifinal	Conor Walsh (0-12 frees); Tom Quirke (1-2); Matthew Tarpey (1-1); Cillian Whelan, Brendan Phelan (0-2); Dara Whelan, Sean Linnane, Sean O'Hanlon (0-1)	Report	Brian Keary (1-8, 0-7 frees); Shane Morgan (0-4, 0-3 frees); Martin McManus (0-3); Darren Shaughnessy, Anthony Burns (0-2); Dylan Shaughnessy (0-1 sideline); Joe Mooney, Neil Keary (0-1)	Pearse Stadium; Referee: Shane Hynes

15 October 2023; 15:30; Senior A – Semifinal	St Thomas's	1-20 - 1-17	Sarsfields	Pearse Stadium; Referee: Brian Keon
15 October 2023; 15:30; Senior A – Semifinal	Conor Cooney (1-14, 0-9 frees, 1-0 penalty, 0-1 '65); Eanna Burke (0-2); John Headd, James Regan, Evan Duggan, Victor Manso (0-1)		Kevin Cooney (1-10, 0-6 frees, 1-0 penalty, 0-1 '65); Ian Fox, Alex Connaire (0-2); Niall Quinn, Darren Murphy (0-1); Niall Morrissey (0-1 sideline)	Pearse Stadium; Referee: Brian Keon

=== Senior A – Final ===
29 October 2023; 14:00; Senior A – Final	St Thomas's	2-12 - 1-13	Turloughmore	Pearse Stadium; Attendance: 7,148; Referee: Liam Gordon
29 October 2023; 14:00; Senior A – Final	Eanna Burke (2-2); Conor Cooney (0-3, 0-1 free); Shane Cooney, Darragh Burke, Victor Manso (0-2); Oisin Flannery (0-1)	Report	Conor Walsh (0-7, 0-6 frees); Daithi Burke (1-0 free); Sean O'Hanlon (0-3); Cillian Whelan, Jamie Holland, Matthew Tarpey (0-1)	Pearse Stadium; Attendance: 7,148; Referee: Liam Gordon

== Senior B ==
Senior B consists of 8 teams divided into two groups of 4.

- The top team from each group will qualify for the semi-finals
- The second and third teams from each group will cross-play in 2 quarter finals
- The winner of the final will play in the 2024 Senior Hurling Championship
- The bottom teams from each group will play off with the loser relegated to Intermediate for 2024

=== Group stage ===
==== Senior B – Group 1 ====
Pos	Team	Pld	W	D	L	SF	SA	Diff	Pts
1	Mullagh	3	3	0	0	7–50	1–52	16	6
2	Ahascragh-Fohenagh	3	1	1	1	4–50	2–55	1	3
3	Liam Mellows	3	1	1	1	2–55	5–51	-5	3
4	Athenry	3	0	0	3	0–54	5–51	-12	0

4 August 2023; 19:30; Round 1	Mullagh	3-18 - 1-16	Liam Mellows	Kenny Park, Athenry; Referee: Noel Quinn
4 August 2023; 19:30; Round 1	Sean Callanan (3-0) Conor Dolphin (0-8, 0-4 frees); Davy Glennon (0-3); Cathal Dervan, Damien Monaghan (0-2); Ronan Glennon (0-1 '65); Sean Hardiman, Keith Coen (0-1)		Adrian Morrissey (0-6, 0-5 frees); Conor Hynes (0-3); Jack Forde (1-0); Jack Hastings, Ronan Elwood (0-2); Luke McPhilbin, Tadhg Haran, Conor Elwood (0-1)	Kenny Park, Athenry; Referee: Noel Quinn

5 August 2023; 16:30; Round 1	Ahascragh-Fohenagh	2-16 - 0-19	Athenry	Duggan Park; Referee: Derek Kelly
5 August 2023; 16:30; Round 1	Cathal Mannion (1-3); Mark Kelly (0-6, 0-5 frees); Owen Naughton (1-1); Luke Murray (0-4); Noel Warde (0-2)		Cian Burke (0-7, 0-4 frees); Donal Parr (0-6 frees); Ronan Hardiman (0-2); Mark Hardiman (0-1 free); Eoin Lawless, Noel Keogh (0-1)	Duggan Park; Referee: Derek Kelly

19 August 2023; 16:00; Round 2	Liam Mellows	0-20 - 0-17	Athenry	Pearse Stadium; Referee: Liam Gordon
19 August 2023; 16:00; Round 2	Adrian Morrissey (0-8, 0-7 frees); Conor Hynes (0-5); Jack Forde (0-2); Mark Hughes, Jack Hastings, Taghg Haran, Eoin Finnerty, Luke Byrnes (0-1)		Donal Parr (0-8, 0-7 frees); Stephen Kelly (0-3, 0-1 free); Kelvin Langan (0-2); Eoin Lawless, Ronan Hardiman, Jack Carr, Ryan O'Donnell (0-1)	Pearse Stadium; Referee: Liam Gordon

20 August 2023; 13:45; Round 2	Mullagh	1-17 - 0-18	Ahascragh-Fohenagh	Duggan Park; Referee: David Staunton
20 August 2023; 13:45; Round 2	Conor Dolphin (1-5, 0-4 frees); Ronan Glennon (0-5 frees); Cathal Dervan, Sean Callanan (0-2); Davy Glennon, Damien Monaghan, Oisin Coen (0-1)		Mark Kelly (0-9, 0-8 frees); Padraic Mannion (0-3); Cathal Mannion, Sean Bleahene (0-2); Cian Kelly, Owen Naughton (0-1)	Duggan Park; Referee: David Staunton

31 August 2023; 19:30; Round 3	Mullagh	3-15 - 0-18	Athenry	Duggan Park; Referee: Seamus Moran
31 August 2023; 19:30; Round 3	Conor Dolphin (1-9, 0-5 frees); Cathal Dervan (1-2, 1-0 penalty); Davy Glennon (1-1); Keith Coen (0-2); Ronan Glennon (0-1)		Cian Burke (0-8, 0-4 frees, 0-1 '65); Donal Parr, Stephen Kelly (0-3); Ronan Hardiman (0-2); Shane Quirke, Conor Lawless (0-1)	Duggan Park; Referee: Seamus Moran

3 September 2023; 15:00; Round 3	Ahascragh-Fohenagh	2-16 - 1-19	Liam Mellows	Loughrea; Referee: John Keane
3 September 2023; 15:00; Round 3	Mark Kelly (0-7 frees); Cathal Mannion (0-4); Ronan Kelly (1-0); Padraic Mannion (0-2 frees); Fintan Glynn, Diarmuid O'Brien, Robert Greene, Sean Bleahene, Luke Murray, Noel Warde (0-1)		Tadhg Haran (1-5, 0-3 frees); Adrain Morrissey (0-5, 0-4 frees); Conor Elwood (0-4); Conor Hynes (1-1); Rory Hynes (0-1)	Loughrea; Referee: John Keane

==== Senior B – Group 2 ====
Pos	Team	Pld	W	D	L	SF	SA	Diff	Pts
1	Kilnadeema-Leitrim	3	3	0	0	5–66	0–50	31	6
4	Padraig Pearses	3	1	0	2	2–52	1–53	2	2
3	Beagh	3	1	0	2	1–52	4–60	-17	2
2	Killimor	3	1	0	2	2–50	5–57	-16	2

4 August 2023; 19:30; Round 1	Killimor	1-20 - 1-16	Beagh	Loughrea; Referee: David Staunton
4 August 2023; 19:30; Round 1	Eoin Horan (1-8, 0-6 frees); Andy Keary (0-3); Eoin McEvoy, Jack Kelly, Anthony Callagy (0-2); Shane Treacy, Ronan Egan, Kevin Hanney (0-1)		Evan Hunt (0-7, 0-5 frees); Daithí Keane (1-1); Adrian Tuohey, Joe Gantley (0-2); Stephen Diviney, Kevin Keehan (0-1 free); Ferdia Tuohey, Tommy McKeown (0-1)	Loughrea; Referee: David Staunton

5 August 2023; 18:15; Round 1	Kilnadeema-Leitrim	0-19 - 0-18	Padraig Pearses	Duggan Park; Referee: Seamus Moran
5 August 2023; 18:15; Round 1	Conor Molloy (0-10, 0-7 frees); Colm Molloy (0-4); Vinny Kenny, Mickey Lynch (0-2); Eanna Kenny (0-1)		Cian Murphy (0-13, 0-9 frees); Ronan Bellew (0-2); E Cunniffy, Dean Reilly, Emmet Ward (0-1)	Duggan Park; Referee: Seamus Moran

19 August 2023; 14:45; Round 2	Kilnadeema-Leitrim	3-21 - 0-17	Killimor	Duggan Park; Referee: Shane Briscoe
19 August 2023; 14:45; Round 2	Eanna Kenny (2-0); Daniel Comar (1-2); Conor Molloy (0-5, 0-1 '65, 0-1 free); Mickey Lynch (0-5); Brian Molloy (0-3, 0-1 free, 0-1 penalty); Stephen Molloy, Vinny Kenny, Colm Molloy (0-2)		Jack Kelly (0-5); Eoin Horan (0-5 frees); Eoin McEvoy (0-3, 0-2 '65, 0-1 free); Kevin Hanney (0-2); Shane Treacy, Anthony Callagy (0-1)	Duggan Park; Referee: Shane Briscoe

20 August 2023; 12:00; Round 2	Beagh	0-21 - 1-14	Padraig Pearses	Loughrea; Referee: Karol Collins
20 August 2023; 12:00; Round 2	Evan Hunt (0-7, 0-5 frees); Joe Gantley (0-5); Daithí Keane (0-4); Stephen Diviney (0-1 free); Darren Hynes, Adrian Tuohey, Padraic Landers, Kevin Keehan (0-1)		Cian Murphy (0-5, 0-4 frees); Emmet Ward (0-4, 0-2 frees); Tomas Flannery (1-0); Fearghal Flannery (0-1 free); Ronan Bellew, Conor O'Neill, Dean Reilly, Orin Burke (0-1)	Loughrea; Referee: Karol Collins

3 September 2023; 16:00; Round 3	Padraig Pearses	1-20 - 1-13	Killimor	Loughrea; Referee: Brian Keon
3 September 2023; 16:00; Round 3	Cian Murphy (0-11, 0-10 frees); Tomas Flannery (1-1); Dean Reilly (0-3); Ferghal Flannery (0-2 frees); Ronan Bellew, Emmet Ward, Conor Fahey (0-1)		Eoin McEvoy (0-8, 0-6 frees, 0-1 penalty); Eoin Horan (0-3, 0-2 frees); Anthony Callagy (1-0); Shane Treacy, Colin Madden (0-1)	Loughrea; Referee: Brian Keon

3 September 2023; 16:00; Round 3	Kilnadeema-Leitrim	2-26 - 0-15	Beagh	Duggan Park; Referee: Derek Kelly
3 September 2023; 16:00; Round 3	Colm Molly (1-5); Brian Molloy (0-6, 0-4 frees); Mickey Lynch (1-2); Stephen Molloy, Vinny Kenny, Eanna Kenny (0-3); Conor Molloy (0-3 frees); Jack Kenny (0-1)		Joe Gantley (0-7); Evan Hunt (0-3 frees); Adrian Tuohey (0-2); Daithí Keane (0-2, 0-1 free); Kevin Keehan (0-1 free)	Duggan Park; Referee: Derek Kelly

==== Senior B – Relegation ====
17 September 2023; 12:00; Senior B – Relegation	Athenry	2-28 - 1-12	Killimor	New Inn; Referee: Shane Hynes
17 September 2023; 12:00; Senior B – Relegation	Cian Burke (0-9, 0-7 frees); Ronan Hardiman (0-6); Jack Carr (1-2); Paddy Rabbitte (1-0); Cillian Lawless, Kelvin Langan, Stephen Kelly, Noel Keogh (0-2); Conor Burke, Paddy Hannon, Conor Lawless (0-1)		Eoin McEvoy (0-6, 0-5 frees); Sean O'Grady (1-0 penalty); Jack Kelly (0-2); Ronan Egan, Eoin Horan, Shane Treacy, Colin Madden (0-1)	New Inn; Referee: Shane Hynes

=== Senior B – Quarter-finals ===
16 September 2023; 16:00; Senior B – Quarter-final	Ahascragh-Fohenagh	1-17 - 0-16	Beagh	Loughrea; Referee: Conor Quinlan
16 September 2023; 16:00; Senior B – Quarter-final	Mark Kelly (0-9, 0-6 frees, 0-1 '65); Luke Murray (1-0); Cathal Mannion (0-3); Padraic Mannion, Robert Greene (0-2); Owen Naughton (0-1)		Evan Hunt (0-9, 0-6 frees); Adrian Tuohey (0-5); Joe Gantley, Padraic Landers (0-1)	Loughrea; Referee: Conor Quinlan

17 September 2023; 13:45; Senior B – Quarter-final	Liam Mellows	3-22 - 1-13	Padraig Pearses	Loughrea; Referee: Sean Byrne
17 September 2023; 13:45; Senior B – Quarter-final	Adrian Morrissey (1-5, 0-1 free, 0-1 '65); Tadhg Haran (0-6, 0-4 frees); Conor Kavanagh, Eoin Finnerty (1-1); Conor Elwood (0-3); Jack Keville, Mark Hughes, Ronan Elwood (0-1)		Cian Murphy (0-6 frees); Emmet Ward (1-1, 1-0 free); Diarmuid Fahey (0-2); Jack Barrett, Luke Mitchell, Orin Burke, Dean Reilly (0-1)	Loughrea; Referee: Sean Byrne

=== Senior B – Semi-finals ===
30 September 2023; 14:00; Senior B – Semi-final	Mullagh	1-20 - 0-18	Liam Mellows	Loughrea; Referee: Karol Collins
30 September 2023; 14:00; Senior B – Semi-final	Conor Dolphin (1-14, 0-9 frees, 0-1 '65); Sean Hardiman (0-2); Ronan Glennon, Cathal Dervan, Sean Callanan, Dean Finnerty (0-1)		Adrian Morrissey (0-8, 0-6 frees); Tadgh Haran (0-5, 0-1 free); Conor Elwood (0-2); Ronan Elwood, Conor Hynes, Luke McPhiblin (0-1)	Loughrea; Referee: Karol Collins

30 September 2023; 15:30; Senior B – Semi-final	Ahascragh-Fohenagh	2-18 - 2-16	Kilnadeema-Leitrim	Loughrea; Referee: Brian Keon
30 September 2023; 15:30; Senior B – Semi-final	Mark Kelly (0-10, 0-9 frees); Cathal Mannion (1-2); Padraic Mannion, Robert Greene (0-2); Sean Bleahene, Diarmuid O'Brien, Luke Murray (0-1)		Brian Molloy (0-11, 0-8 frees); Eanna Kenny (1-2); Vinny Kenny (1-1); Colm Molloy (0-1); Conor Molloy (0-1 free)	Loughrea; Referee: Brian Keon

=== Senior B – Final ===
==== Drawn Game ====
14 October 2023; 16:00; Senior B – Final	Mullagh	2-15 - 1-18	Ahascragh-Fohenagh	Duggan Park; Referee: Conor Quinlan
14 October 2023; 16:00; Senior B – Final	Conor Dolphin (0-6, 0-3 frees); Sean Callanan (1-1); Damien Monaghan (1-0); Ronan Glennon (0-2 frees); Cathal Dervan, Keith Coen (0-2); Sean Hardiman, Sean O'Brien (0-1)		Mark Kelly (0-6, 0-4 frees); Cathal Mannion (0-5); Mark Kelly Jr (1-0); Luke Murray, Noel Warde (0-2); Sean Bleahene, Diarmuid O'Brien, Owen Naughton (0-1)	Duggan Park; Referee: Conor Quinlan

==== Replay ====
28 October 2023; 15:45; Senior B – Final	Mullagh	0-17 - 1-13	Ahascragh-Fohenagh	Duggan Park; Referee: Sean Byrne
