= Galway Junior A Hurling Championship =

Annual hurling competition

- Current season or competition: 2026 Galway Junior A Hurling Championship
- Irish: Craobh Iomána Shóisearach A na Gaillimhe
- Code: Hurling
- Region: Galway (GAA)
- Title holders: Turloughmore (7th title)
- Sponsors: Brooks
- Official website: Official website

The Galway Junior A Hurling Championship (known for sponsorship reasons as the Brooks Galway Junior A Hurling Championship and abbreviated to the Galway JAHC) is an annual hurling competition organised by the Galway County Board of the Gaelic Athletic Association and contested by junior clubs in the county of Galway in Ireland. It is the fourth tier overall in the entire Galway hurling championship system.

Turloughmore are the title holders, beating Tommy Larkins by 3-14 to 3-10 in the 2023 final.

== History ==
For a long time the Galway Junior A Hurling Championship was the highest tier of Junior Hurling in Galway and the third tier overall after Senior and Intermediate. With the introduction of the Galway Senior B Hurling Championship which became a stand-alone competition in its own right in 2023 it became the fourth tier overall.

In 2026, the Galway Senior B Championship was reclassified as the Galway Premier Intermediate Hurling Championship. Furthermore the new Galway Premier Junior Hurling Championship was introduced including teams from the former Intermediate Championship and the Junior A Championship. The Galway Junior A Championship became the 2nd tier in Junior Hurling and remained 4th tier overall.

It is also the highest tier were 2nd string teams are allowed.

== Teams ==
=== 2026 teams ===
The 12 teams competing in the 2026 Galway Junior A Hurling Championship were:

Club	Location	Colours	Position in 2026
Ballinderreen	Ballinaderreen	Green and white	Quarter-Final
Carnmore	Carnmore	Red and white	Semi-Finals
Gort	Gort	Green and Yellow	Quarter-Final
Kilnadeema/Leitrim	Kilnadeema and Leitrim	Maroon, White and Blue	Group stage
Killimordaly	Killimordaly	Green and White	Quarter-Final
Meelick-Eyrecourt	Meelick and Eyrecourt	Blue and white	Relegated
Mullagh	Mullagh	Green and White	Group stage
Portumna	Portumna	Blue and Yellow	Quarter-Final
Sarsfields	Bullaun, New Inn and Woodlawn	White and green	Semi-Finals
Tommy Larkins	Ballinakill/Derrybrien	Red and Black	Runners-up
Turloughmore	Turloughmore	Black and White	Champion
Tynagh-Abbey/Duniry	Tynagh	Blue and green	Relegation Final

== Qualification for subsequent competitions ==
Up to 2025 the winning team qualify to the subsequent Connacht Junior Club Hurling Championship, the winner of which progresses to the All-Ireland Junior Club Hurling Championship. Since 2026 the winner of the Galway Premier Junior Hurling Championship qualifies instead.

== Roll of honour ==
=== Roll of honour ===
#	Club	Titles	Championships won
1	Athenry	10	2024, 2019, 2011, 2008, 2004, 1993, 1957, 1929, 1916, 1909
2	Turloughmore	7	1907, 1949, 1954, 1991, 1997, 2018, 2026
3	Ardrahan	2	1934, 1979
3	Loughrea	2	2012, 2009
3	Craughwell	2	2021, 2013
3	St. Thomas'	2	2025, 1972
7	Sarsfields	1	1996
7	Tommy Larkins	1	2006
7	Castlegar	1	2007
7	Mullagh	1	2008
7	Gort	1	2010
7	Annaghdown	1	2014
7	An Spideal	1	2015
7	Meelick-Eyrecourt	1	2016
7	Sylane	1	2017
7	Clarinbridge	1	2020
7	Skehana/Mountbellew–Moylough	1	2023
7	Ballygar	1	2024

== List of finals ==
=== List of Galway JAHC finals ===
Year	Winners		Runners-up		Venue
Year	Club	Score	Club	Score	Venue
2026	Turloughmore	3-14	Tommy Larkins	3-10	Kenny Park
2025	St. Thomas'	1-25	Loughrea	1-20	Duggan Park
2024	Athenry	2-15	Loughrea	1-12	Kenny Park
2023	Skehana/Mountbellew–Moylough	1-13	Loughrea	0-13	Duggan Park
2022	Ballygar	1-17	Skehana/Mountbellew–Moylough	1-16	Duggan Park
2021	Craughwell	1-19	Liam Mellows	2-09	
2020	Clarinbridge	3-12	Salthill-Knocknacarra	2-06	
2019	Athenry	3-21	Salthill-Knocknacarra	0-14	
2018	Turloughmore	3-13	Sarsfields	1-16	
2017	Sylane	3-18	Tommy Larkins	1-08	
2016	Meelick-Eyrecourt	2-12	Sarsfields	0-14	
2015	An Spideal	0-13	Castlegar	0-10	
2014	Annaghdown	1-08	An Spideal	0-07	
2013	Craughwell	2-07	Annaghdown	1-09	
2012	Loughrea	1-09	Bearna/Na Forbacha	1-07	
2011	Athenry	2-08	Ballygar	0-07	
2010	Gort	2-13	Portumna	1-10	
2009	Loughrea	1-10	Sarsfields	1-05	
2008	Mullagh	0-13	Skehana	0-07	
2007	Castlegar	0-14	Meelick-Eyrecourt	0-13	
2006	Tommy Larkins	2-06	Skehana	0-08	
2005	No record				
2004	Athenry				
2003					
2002					
2001					
2000					
1998–1999	No record				
1997	Turloughmore				
1996	Sarsfields				
1994–1995	No record				
1993	Athenry				
1992					
1991	Turloughmore				
1980–1990	No record				
1979	Ardrahan				
1973–1978	No record				
1972	St. Thomas'				
1958–1971	No record				
1957	Athenry				
1955–1956	No record				
1954	Turloughmore				
1950–1953	No record				
1949	Turloughmore				
1935–1948	No record				
1934	Ardrahan				
1908–1933	No record				
1907	Turloughmore				

== See also ==
- Galway Senior Hurling Championship (Tier 1)
- Galway B Senior Hurling Championship (Tier 2)
- Galway Intermediate Hurling Championship (Tier 3)
