= Galway Premier Intermediate Hurling Championship =

- Current season or competition: 2026 Galway Premier Intermediate Hurling Championship
- Irish: Craobh Príomh-Idirmheánach Iomáint na Gaillimhe
- Code: Hurling
- Founded: 2026; 0 years ago
- Region: Galway (GAA)
- Trophy: Mick Sylver Memorial Cup
- No. of teams: 16
- Title holders: Kilconieran (1st title)
- First winner: Kilconieran
- Sponsors: Steeltech Sheds
- Official website: Official website

The Galway Premier Intermediate Hurling Championship (known for sponsorship reasons as the Steeltech Sheds Galway Premier Intermediate Hurling Championship and abbreviated to the Galway PIHC) is an annual hurling competition organised by the Galway County Board of the Gaelic Athletic Association and contested by the top-ranking intermediate clubs in the county of Galway in Ireland.

The Galway Premier Intermediate Hurling Championship was introduced in 2026 following a reclassification and restructuring of the existing senior and intermediate grades of hurling. It is the second tier overall in the entire Galway hurling championship system.

In its present format, the championship begins with a 16-team round-robin format. The 12 qualifying teams advance to the knockout stage that culminates with the final match in October. The four bottom-ranked teams contest the relegation stage. The winner of the Galway Premier Intermediate Hurling Championship, as well as gaining automatic promotion to the Galway Senior Hurling Championship, qualifies for the subsequent Connacht Club Championship.

== Teams ==
In 2026 the following 16 teams took part in the Championship:

| Team | Position in 2026 | In Championship since |
|---|---|---|
| Mullagh | Final | 2026 |
| Kilconieron | Final | 2026 |
| Meelick-Eyrecourt | Semi-Final | 2026 |
| Skehana-Mountbellew/Moylough | Semi-Final | 2026 |
| Portumna | Quarter-Final | 2026 |
| Ballygar | Quarter-Final | 2026 |
| Ballinderreen | Quarter-Final | 2026 |
| Tynagh Abbey Duniry | Quarter-Final | 2026 |
| Kilnadeema/Leitrim | Preliminary Quarter-Final | 2026 |
| Rahoon-Newcastle | Preliminary Quarter-Final | 2026 |
| Ahascragh–Fohenagh | Preliminary Quarter-Final | 2026 |
| Killimor | Preliminary Quarter-Final | 2026 |
| Kinvara | Relegation Semi-Final | 2026 |
| Carnmore | Relegation Semi-Final | 2026 |
| Pádraig Pearses | Relegation Final | 2026 |
| Beagh | Relegated to PJHC | 2026 |

== History ==
The Galway Intermediate Hurling Championship was founded in 1949 in an effort to bridge the standard of play between the Galway Senior Hurling Championship and the Galway Junior Hurling Championship. This remained the second tier competition in the Galway hurling championship system for a number of years, until the introduction of the Galway Senior B Hurling Championship. This became a stand-alone competition in its own right in 2023.

In 2026, the Galway Senior B Championship was reclassified as the Galway Premier Intermediate Hurling Championship. It was expanded from eight to 16 teams. These 16 teams comprised Kilconieron, who were relegated from the Galway SHC the previous year, the seven teams from the previous year's Galway SBHC and the top eight teams from the group stage of the former Galway IHC.

== Format ==
=== Group stage ===
The 16 teams are divided into four groups of four. Over the course of the group stage each team plays once against the others in the group, resulting in each team being guaranteed at least three games. Two points are awarded for a win, one for a draw and zero for a loss. The teams are ranked in the group stage table by points gained, then scoring difference and then their head-to-head record.

=== Knockout stage ===
Following the completion of the group stage, the top three teams from each group advance to the knockout stage.

- Preliminary quarter-finals: The second and third-ranked teams from each group contest this round. The four winners from these four games advance to the quarter-finals.
- Quarter-finals: The top-ranked teams from each group receive a bye to this round. The four preliminary quarter-final winners complete the four pairings. The four winners from these four games advance to the semi-finals.
- Semi-finals: The four quarter-final winners contest this round. The two winners from these two games advance to the final.
- Final: The two semi-final winners contest the final. The winning team are declared champions.

=== Promotion and relegation ===
At the end of the championship, the winning team is automatically promoted to the Galway Senior Hurling Championship for the following season. The four bottom-placed teams from the group stage take part in a series of playoffs, with the losing team being relegated to the Galway Premier Junior Hurling Championship.

== Sponsorship ==
Steeltech Sheds became the first title sponsor of the championship in 2026.

== Qualification for subsequent competitions ==
At the end of the championship, the winning team progresses as the Galway representatives in the Connacht Intermediate Club Hurling Championship.

== Finals ==
=== List of finals ===
| Year | Winners | | Runners-up | | Venue | # |
| Year | Club | Score | Club | Score | Venue | # |
|---|---|---|---|---|---|---|
| 2026 | Kilconieron | 0-24 | Mullagh | 1-20 | Kenny Park | |

=== Notes ===
- 2026: The first match ended in a draw: Kilconieron 2-17 - 1-20 Mullagh.
