= Galway Premier Junior Hurling Championship =

- Current season or competition: 2026 Galway Premier Junior Hurling Championship
- Code: Hurling
- Founded: 2026; 0 years ago
- Region: Galway (GAA)
- Trophy: Phelim Murphy Cup
- No. of teams: 10
- Official website: Official website

The Galway Premier Junior Hurling Championship and abbreviated to the Galway PJHC is an annual hurling competition organised by the Galway County Board of the Gaelic Athletic Association and contested by the top-ranking Junior clubs in the county of Galway in Ireland.

The champion is rewarded the Phelim Murphy Cup.

The Galway Premier Junior Hurling Championship was introduced in 2026 following a reclassification and restructuring of the existing senior, intermediate and junior grades of hurling. It is the third tier overall in the entire Galway hurling championship system.

In its present format, the championship begins with a 10-team round-robin format. The 8 qualifying teams advance to the knockout stage that culminates with the final match in late October or early November. The winner of the Galway Premier Junior Hurling Championship, as well as gaining promotion to the Galway Premier Intermediate Hurling Championship, qualifies for the subsequent Connacht Junior Club Championship.

Sylane became the inaugural champion after beating Abbeyknockmoy 1–17 to 0–18 in the final.

== Teams ==
In 2026 the following 16 teams took part in the Championship:

| Team | Position in 2026 | In Championship since |
| Sylane | Champion | 2026 |
| Abbeyknockmoy | Final | 2026 |
| Kilbeacanty | Semi-Final | 2026 |
| Ballinasloe | Semi-Final | 2026 |
| Spiddal | Quarter-Final | 2026 |
| Mícheál Breathnach | Quarter-Final | 2026 |
| Annaghdown | Quarter-Final | 2026 |
| Salthill-Knocknacarra | Quarter-Final | 2026 |
| Bearna/Na Forbacha | Group stage | 2026 |
| Kiltormer | Group stage | 2026 |

== History ==
The Galway Intermediate Hurling Championship was founded in 1949 in an effort to bridge the standard of play between the Galway Senior Hurling Championship and the Galway Junior Hurling Championship. This remained the second-tier competition in the Galway hurling championship system for a number of years, until the introduction of the Galway Senior B Hurling Championship. This became a stand-alone competition in its own right in 2023.

In 2026, the Galway Senior B Championship was reclassified as the Galway Premier Intermediate Hurling Championship. It was expanded from eight to 16 teams. These 16 teams comprised Kilconieron, who were relegated from the Galway SHC the previous year, the seven teams from the previous year's Galway SBHC and the top eight teams from the group stage of the former Galway IHC. The remaining four teams of the IHC formed the new Premier Junior Hurling Championship together with the top six teams excluding second-string teams from the Junior A Championship.

== Format ==
=== Group stage ===
The 10 teams are divided into two groups of five. Over the course of the group stage each team plays once against the others in the group. Two points are awarded for a win, one for a draw and zero for a loss. The teams are ranked in the group stage table by points gained, then scoring difference and then their head-to-head record.

=== Knockout stage ===
Following the completion of the group stage, the top four teams from each group advance to the knockout stage.

- Quarter-finals: The first placed team faces the fourth placed team of the other group, while the second placed team faces the third placed team. The four winners from these four games advance to the semi-finals.
- Semi-finals: The four quarter-final winners contest this round. The two winners from these two games advance to the final.
- Final: The two semi-final winners contest the final. The winning team are declared champions.

=== Promotion and relegation ===
At the end of the championship, the winning team is automatically promoted to the Galway Premier Intermediate Championship for the following season.

== Qualification for subsequent competitions ==
At the end of the championship, the winning team progresses as the Galway representatives in the Connacht Junior Club Hurling Championship.

== List of Finals ==
| Year | Champions | Score | Runners-up | Score |
|---|---|---|---|---|
| 2026 | Sylane | 1-17 | Abbeyknockmoy | 0-18 |
