= Galway Intermediate Hurling Championship =

Irish hurling competition

- Current season or competition: Discontinued
- Irish: Craobh Iomána Idirmhéanach na Gaillimhe
- Code: Hurling
- Founded: 1949; 77 years ago
- Region: Galway (GAA)
- Trophy: Mick Sylver Cup
- No. of teams: 16
- Most titles: Mullagh (4 titles); Pádraig Pearses (4 titles); Killimordaly (4 titles)
- Sponsors: brooks
- TV partner: beosport
- Official website: Official website

The Galway Intermediate Hurling Championship (known for sponsorship reasons as the Galmont Hotel Intermediate Hurling Championship and abbreviated to the Galway IHC) is an annual hurling competition organised by the Galway County Board of the Gaelic Athletic Association and contested by the top-ranking intermediate clubs in the county of Galway in Ireland. It is the second tier overall in the entire Galway hurling championship system.

The Galway Intermediate Championship was introduced in 1949 as a competition that would bridge the gap between the senior grade and the junior grade.

The winner of the Galway Intermediate Championship, as well as being presented with the Mick Sylver Cup, used to qualify for the subsequent Connacht Intermediate Club Championship.

The competition has been won by 37 teams, 21 of which have won it more than once. Mullagh, Pádraig Pearses and Killimordaly are the most successful teams in the tournament's history, having won it 4 times each.

In 2026 the championship was discontinued and replaced by the Galway Premier Intermediate Hurling Championship and the Galway Premier Junior Hurling Championship.

== Qualification for subsequent competitions ==
=== Connacht Intermediate Club Hurling Championship ===
The Galway IHC winners qualified for the Connacht Intermediate Club Hurling Championship.The Galway IHC winners entered the Connacht Intermediate Club Hurling Championship at the final stage. For example, 2018 winner Oranmore-Maree won the Connacht IHC, as did 2016 winner Ahascragh-Fohenagh, and 2015 winner Abbeyknockmoy 2014 winner Cappataggle also won, becoming the ninth Galway IHC club to do so.

=== All-Ireland Intermediate Club Hurling Championship ===
The Galway IHC winners — by winning the Connacht Intermediate Club Hurling Championship — qualified for the All-Ireland Intermediate Club Hurling Championship, at which they would enter at the semi-final stage. For example, 2018 Galway IHC winner Oranmore-Maree (featuring Galway All-Ireland Senior Hurling Championship winners Gearóid McInerney (All Star) and Niall Burke) won the All-Ireland Championship title at Croke Park.

== Roll of honour ==
=== By club ===
#	Club	Titles	Championships won
1	Mullagh	4	1972, 1974, 1982, 2003
1	Pádraig Pearses	4	1979, 1991, 1995, 2010
1	Killimordaly	4	1951, 1963, 2006, 2012
4	Kilconieron	3	1911, 1993, 2020
4	Cappataggle	3	1962, 2008, 2014
4	Abbeyknockmoy	3	1971, 1985, 2015
4	Ballinderreen	3	2000, 2017, 2023
4	Moycullen	3	1964, 2011, 2021
4	Meelick-Eyrecourt	3	1973, 1997, 2025
10	Carnmore	2	1961, 1988
10	Killimor	2	1984, 2022
10	Clarinbridge	2	1983, 1994
10	Kiltormer	2	1975, 2001
10	Beagh	2	1980, 2002
10	St. Thomas'	2	1996, 2004
10	Tommy Larkins	2	2005, 2007
10	Kilnadeema-Leitrim	2	1999, 2013
10	Ballinderreen	2	2000, 2017
10	Oranmore-Maree	2	1990, 2018
10	Kinvara	2	1966, 2019
10	Tynagh-Abbey/Duniry	2	2009, 2024
22	Kilrickle	1	1949
22	Oranmore	1	1950
22	Skehana	1	1952
22	Maree	1	1953
22	Eyrecourt	1	1959
22	Newcastle	1	1960
22	Ardrahan	1	1965
22	Sarsfields	1	1976
22	Rahoon	1	1977
22	Kilbeacanty	1	1978
22	Loughrea	1	1981
22	Craughwell	1	1986
22	Tynagh	1	1987
22	Portumna	1	1992
22	Athenry	1	1998
22	Ahascragh-Fohenagh	1	2016

== List of finals ==
=== Legend ===
- Gold – All-Ireland intermediate club champions
- Silver – All-Ireland intermediate club runners-up

=== List of Galway IHC finals ===
Year	Winners		Runners-up	
Year	Club	Score	Club	Score
Replaced by Galway Premier Intermediate Hurling Championship
2025	Meelick-Eyrecourt	1-16	Kinvara	0-16
2024	Tynagh-Abbey/Duniry	2-16	Kinvara	0-17
2023	Ballinderreen	3-18	Tynagh-Abbey/Duniry	2-18
2022	Killimor	0-13	Meelick-Eyrecourt	0-09
2021	Moycullen	2-11	Killimor	1-12
2020	Kilconieron	2-27	Moycullen	0-10
2019	Kinvara	1-10	Kilconieron	0-12
2018	Oranmore-Maree	3-19	Kilconieron	1-11
2017	Ballinderreen	1-14	Meelick-Eyrecourt	0-13
2016	Ahascragh/Fohenagh	2-15	Ballinderreen	0-08
2015	Abbeyknockmoy	1-16	Moycullen	0-13
2014	Cappataggle	0-11; 0-19	Ahascragh/Fohenagh	0-11; 1-08
2013	Kilnadeema-Leitrim	2-14	Cappataggle	1-04
2012	Killimordaly	0-17	Ahascragh/Fohenagh	0-14
2011	Moycullen	2-10	Killimordaly	0-13
2010	Pádraig Pearse's	1-10	Killimor	1-08
2009	Tynagh-Abbey/Duniry	1-20	Meelick-Eyrecourt	1-16
2008	Cappataggle	1-10	Killimordaly	0-11
2007	Tommy Larkins	0-13	Pádraig Pearse's	0-10
2006	Killimordaly	3-11	Kiltormer	1-12
2005	Tommy Larkins	1-14	Beagh	0-08
2004	St. Thomas'	2-14	Meelick-Eyrecourt	1-08
2003	Mullagh	0-12; 1-13	Liam Mellows	2-06; 0-10
2002	Beagh	1-13; 1-12	Mullagh	2-10; 1-10
2001	Kiltormer	0-09	Oranmore-Maree	0-08
2000	Ballinderreen	1-08	Kiltormer	0-04
1999	Kilnadeema-Leitrim	2-09	Kiltormer	1-09
1998	Athenry	0-17	Craughwell	2-09
1997	Meelick-Eyrecourt	0-11	Kiltormer	0-08
1996	St. Thomas'	2-10	Craughwell	1-08
1995	Pádraig Pearse's	0-14	Meelick-Eyrecourt	1-08
1994	Clarinbridge	3-15	Tommy Larkins	1-07
1993	Kilconieron	0-13	Beagh	2-05
1992	Portumna	0-14; 6-08	Kilconieron	1-11; 1-05
1991	Pádraig Pearse's	0-08; 2-06	Killimor	1-05; 1-05
1990	Oranmore-Maree	0-12	Portumna	2-05
1989	Abbey-Duniry	1-11; 3-07	Portumna	0-14; 2-05
1988	Carnmore	1-09	Pádraig Pearse's	0-04
1987	Tynagh	1-11	Pádraig Pearse's	2-7
1986	Craughwell	1-09	Carnmore	0-06
1985	Abbeyknockmoy	1-09	Craughwell	0-06
1984	Killimor	3-07	Tynagh	0-09
1983	Clarinbridge	1-09	Oranmore-Maree	1-03
1982	Mullagh	3-13	Tynagh	1-03
1981	Loughrea	3-08	Killimor	2-07
1980	Beagh	4-13	Mullagh	3-11
1979	Pádraig Pearse's	2-07	Killimor	2-05
1978	Kilbeacanty	0-17	St. Thomas'	2-04
1977	Rahoon	3-12	Pádraig Pearse's	1-12
1976	Sarsfields	3-04	Killimor	0-04
1975	Kiltormer	0-12; 5-07	Killimor	1-09; 3-04
1974	Mullagh	3-07	Kiltormer	1-09
1973	Meelick-Eyrecourt	3-08	Craughwell	4-03
1972	Mullagh	1-10	Ahascragh	0-05
1971	Abbeyknockmoy		Kiltormer	
1970	No Championship			
1969	No Championship			
1968	No Championship			
1967	No Championship			
1966	Kinvara	1-09	Oranmore	2-00
1965	Ardrahan	5-04	Tynagh	0-07
1964	Moycullen	7-13	Cappataggle	5-02
1963	Killimordaly	3-12	Cussane	4-07
1962	Cappataggle	5-12	Ardrahan	4-05
1961	Carnmore	4-05	Loughrea	4-01
1960	Newcastle	2-04	Ballindereen	2-03
1959	Eyrecourt	1-05	Newcastle	0-04
1958	No Championship			
1957	No Championship			
1956	No Championship			
1955	No Championship			
1954	No Championship			
1953	Maree	6-01	Craughwell	4-01
1952	Skehana	3-05	Craughwell	3-3
1951	Killimordaly	6-07	Clarinbridge	3-02
1950	Oranmore	3-05	Killimor	3-01
1949	Kilrickle			

== See also ==
- Galway Senior Hurling Championship (Tier 1)
- Galway Senior B Hurling Championship (Tier 2)
- Galway Premier Junior Hurling Championship (Tier 3)
- Galway Junior A Hurling Championship (Tier 4)
