= Sylane GAA =

Gaelic games club in County Galway, Ireland

Sylane
- Saighleán
- Founded: 1984
- County: Galway
- Colours: Black and amber
- Grounds: Sylaun

Playing kits
Standard colours

Sylane GAA is a Gaelic Athletic Association club located in Sylaun, County Galway, Ireland. The club is primarily concerned with the game of hurling.

== History ==
Located in the townland of Sylaun, just outside Tuam, County Galway, Sylane GAA Club was founded in 1984. The club has spent most of its existence operating in the junior grade, however, as of 2017, Sylane compete in the Galway IHC. The club has won Connacht JCHC titles in 2007, 2015, 2017 and 2026. A sister camogie club was established in 2008.

In 2026 they won the inaugural Galway Premier Junior Hurling Championship.

== Honours ==
- Connacht Junior Club Hurling Championship (4): 2007, 2015, 2017, 2026
- Galway Premier Junior Hurling Championship (1): 2026
