= Niall Donohue =

Irish hurler

Personal information
- Native name: Niall Ó Donnchú (Irish)
- Born: 25 October 1990 Kilbeacanty, County Galway, Ireland
- Died: 23 October 2013 (aged 22)
- Height: 6 ft 0 in (183 cm)

Sport
- Sport: Hurling
- Position: Left half back (No7)
Club
- Years: Club
- 2007–2013: Kilbeacanty
Club titles
- Galway titles: 0
Inter-county
Years	County	Apps (scores)
2012–2013	Galway	7 (0-1)
Inter-county titles
- Leinster titles: 1
- All-Irelands: 0
- NHL: 0
- All Stars: 0

Niall Donohue (also spelled Donoghue) (25 October 1990 − 23 October 2013) was an Irish hurler who played at senior level for the Galway senior team.

At club level he played with Kilbeacanty.

== Early life and career ==
Born in Kilbeacanty, County Galway, Donohue first played competitive hurling while at school in Gort Community School. He arrived on the inter-county scene at the age of seventeen when he first linked up with the Galway minor team, before later joining the under-21 side. He made his senior debut in the 2012 National Hurling League. Donohue played a key part for Galway over the following two seasons, and won one Leinster medal in 2012. He was an All-Ireland runner-up on one occasion, also in 2012. He was also nominated for an All Star in 2012.

As a member of the Connacht inter-provincial team for two successive years, Donohue unsuccessfully contested two Railway Cup finals in 2012 and 2013. At club level he played with Kilbeacanty.

== Death ==
Donohue was found dead by suicide in his home on 23 October 2013, two days before his 23rd birthday. His death brought the topic of suicide into public consciousness.

== Honours ==
Galway

- Leinster Senior Hurling Championship (1): 2012
- All-Ireland Under-21 Hurling Championship (1): 2011
