= Steve Mahon =

Irish hurler

Personal information
- Native name: Stiofán Mathúin (Irish)
- Born: 6 December 1957 (age 68) Kilbeacanty, County Galway, Ireland
- Occupation: Builder
- Height: 6 ft 0 in (183 cm)

Sport
- Sport: Hurling
- Position: Midfield
Club
- Years: Club
- Kilbeacanty
Club titles
- Galway titles: 0
Inter-county*
Years	County	Apps (scores)
1978-1988	Galway	22 (1-18)
Inter-county titles
- All-Irelands: 2
- NHL: 1
- All Stars: 2
- *Inter County team apps and scores correct as of 21:58, 3 February 2013.

Steve Mahon (born 6 December 1957) is an Irish retired hurler who played as a midfielder for the Galway senior team.

Born in Kilbeacanty, County Galway, Mahon first played competitive hurling whilst at Ballyturn National School. He made his first impression on the inter-county scene when he joined the Galway under-21 team. He made his senior debut during the 1978-79 National Hurling League. Mahon went on to play a key role for Galway for almost a decade, and won two All-Ireland medals on the field of play and one National Hurling League medal. He was an All-Ireland runner-up on four occasions.

As a member of the Connacht inter-provincial team at various times throughout his career, Mahon won five Railway Cup medals. At club level he is a one-time intermediate championship medallist with Kilbeacanty.

Throughout his career Mahon made 22 championship appearances for Galway. His retirement came following the conclusion of the 1988 championship.

== Honours ==
=== Player ===
Kilbeacanty

- Galway Intermediate Hurling Championship (1): 1978 (c)
- Galway Junior C Hurling Championship (1): 1997

Galway

- All-Ireland Senior Hurling Championship (2): 1980, 1987
- National Hurling League (1): 1986-87
- All-Ireland Under-21 Hurling Championship (1): 1978

Connacht

- Railway Cup (4): 1980, 1982, 1983, 1986, 1987

=== Individual ===
Awards

- All-Star (2): 1981, 1987
