= Pat Malone (hurler) =

Irish hurler

Personal information
- Born: 8 March 1965 (age 61) Galway, Ireland
- Height: 1.78 m (5 ft 10 in)

Sport
- Sport: Hurling
- Position: Midfield
Club
- Years: Club
- Oranmore-Maree
Inter-county
- Years: County
- 1980s-1990s: Galway
Inter-county titles
- All-Irelands: 2
- NHL: 1
- All Stars: 1

Pat Malone (born 8 March 1965) is a former Irish sportsperson. He played hurling with his local club Oranmore-Maree and with the Galway senior inter-county team in the 1980s and 1990s. Malone won back-to-back All-Ireland winners' medals with Galway in 1987 and 1988. Malone also won an All Star in 1993
