= Kilbeacanty GAA =

- Founded: 1885
- County: Galway
- Colours: Blue and Gold
- Grounds: Kilbeacanty

Kilbeacanty GAA is a Gaelic Athletic Association club located in the village of Kilbeacanty south County Galway, Ireland. The club is almost exclusively concerned with hurling. The club competes in Galway GAA competitions. In 2008 it amalgamated with neighbouring Beagh at juvenile level forming Michael Cusack's Hurling Club.

== Honours ==
=== Hurling ===
- Galway Intermediate Hurling Championship (1)
  - 1978

== Notable players ==
- Steve Mahon - All-Ireland Senior Hurling Championship winner 1980 and 1987
- Niall Donohue - Member of the Galway Senior hurling panel 2012-2013
