= Cappataggle GAA =

Gaelic sports club in County Galway, Ireland

Cappataggle
- Ceapach an tSeagail
- Founded: 1885
- County: Galway
- Nickname: Cappy
- Colours: Red and Black
- Grounds: Cappataggle Community Sportsfield
- Coordinates: 53°16′16″N 8°24′32″W

Playing kits
Standard colours

Cappataggle GAA is a Gaelic Athletic Association club based in the village of Cappataggle in County Galway, Ireland. The club, which is exclusively concerned with the game of hurling, fields teams in competitions organised by the Galway GAA County Board. Founded in 1885, the club built a state-of-the-art astro pitch in 2009.

== Honours ==
- Connacht Intermediate Club Hurling Championship (1): 2008, 2014
- Galway Senior Hurling League (1):2019
- Galway Intermediate Hurling Championship: (3): 1962, 2008, 2014
- Galway Intermediate Hurling League (3): 2008, 2013, 2014
- Galway Junior A Hurling Championship (1): 1994

== Notable people ==
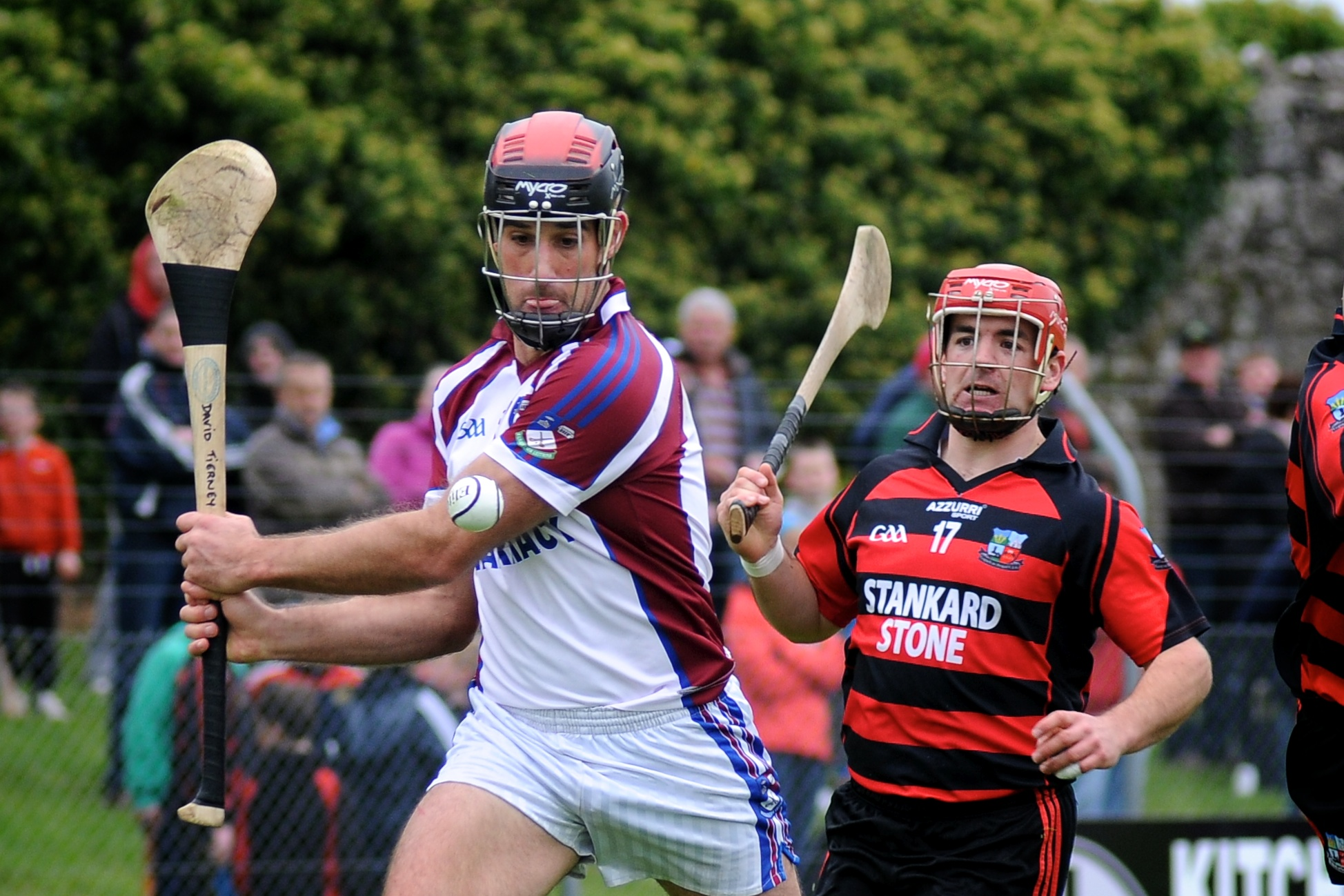
Action from the 2013 Galway IHC final: Brian Byrnes of Cappataggle at right, David Tierney of Kilnadeema–Leitrim is at left.

- Liam Collins
