= Beagh GAA =

Gaelic sports club in County Galway, Ireland

- CLG Beithe
- Founded: 1870
- County: Galway
- Colours: Black and Amber
- Grounds: Cregmahon, Shanaglish
- Coordinates: 53.016189°N 8.822569°W

Playing kits
Standard colours

Senior Club Championships
	All Ireland	Connacht champions	Galway champions
Hurling:	0	0	0

Beagh GAA is a Gaelic Athletic Association club located near Shanaglish in south County Galway, Ireland. The club is almost exclusively concerned with hurling. The club competes in Galway GAA competitions and fields two teams, Junior A and Junior C. In 2008 it amalgamated with neighbouring Kilbacenty at juvenile level forming Michael Cusack's Hurling Club.

== History ==
Beagh is one of few clubs whose foundation predates the Gaelic Athletic Association; their first recorded game, against Kilbeacanty in 1870, was attended by Michael Cusack himself.

The 1980s were the most successful years in the club's history with the club achieving Senior Hurling status in 1980 by winning the County Intermediate title.

In 2013, Beagh reached their first ever Galway Senior Hurling Championship semi-final when they defeated Turloughmore in the quarter-final by 2-12 to 1-13. They were defeated in the semi-final by Loughrea by 2-18 to 1-11.

On 15 October 2016, Beagh won the County Junior C Hurling Championship, beating Turloughmore in the final by 1-15 to 0-15.

On 2 September 2017, Beagh won their first All-Ireland Sevens title at Kilmacud Crokes GAA club, defeating Clare's Whitegate 5-17 to 1-22.

On 5 October 2024, Beagh were defeated on a score line of 0-10 to 0-11 after extra time in the 2024 Galway Senior B Hurling Championship relegation final replay by Ahascragh Fohenagh. Beagh have played in the Galway Intermediate Hurling Championship since 2025.

On 3 October 2026, Beagh were defeated on a scoreline of 1-21 to 1-18 by Pádraig Pearse's in the Premier Intermediate Hurling Relegation Final, they will play in the Premier Junior Hurling Championship in 2027.

== Honours ==
=== Hurling ===
- Galway Intermediate Hurling Championship (2)
  - 1980, 2002
- Galway Junior C Hurling Championship (1)
  - 2016
- All-Ireland Sevens Hurling (1)
  - 2017

== Notable players ==
- Finbarr Gantley - All-Ireland Senior Hurling Championship winner 1980
- Joe Gantley - Member of the Galway Senior hurling panel 2009-2011
- Rory Gantley - Member of the Galway Senior hurling panel 1999 - 2004
- Mick Deely - Member of the Galway Senior hurling panel 1982-1983
- John Moylan - Member of the Galway Senior hurling panel 1984-1985
- Adrian Tuohy - All-Ireland Senior Hurling Championship winner 2017
