= Oranmore–Maree GAA =

Gaelic sports club in County Galway, Ireland

Maree–Oranmore GAA
- Uarán Mór–Mearaí
- Founded: 1967
- County: Galway
- Nickname: Seasiders
- Colours: Sky Blue and Navy
- Grounds: Kings Tully fields and Oldtown

Playing kits
Standard colours

Senior Club Championships
	All Ireland	Connacht champions	Galway champions
Hurling:	-	-	1
Camogie:	1	-	11

Oranmore–Maree GAA is a Gaelic Athletic Association club located in the town of Oranmore and surrounding area of Maree, County Galway, Ireland. It was founded in 1967.

== History ==
The club was founded in 1967 and fields teams in both Gaelic football and hurling. The club was formed through a county by-law which ruled that there should be only one team per parish, previous to this Oranmore and Maree had teams. Maree wore green and black jerseys while Oranmore wore Black and Amber. Maree won the Galway Senior Hurling Championship in 1933 beating Castlegar 5-06 to 6-02.

The GAA club has provided several hurlers and footballers to the Galway Senior Hurling Team and football teams these include Pat Malone, who won 2 All-Ireland medals in 1987 and 1988 respectively, Richard Burke, William Burke, Aidan Divney, Michael Hanniffy and later members of the panel Gearoid McInerney, Niall Burke and Brendan Hanniffy.

The GAA Club has also won several under-age titles in both Hurling and Football and completed a unique double in 2014 when the Under 16 and Under 21 footballers and hurlers won their respective championships, this was followed by Minor hurling and football championship victories in 2015. In total the club has won 48 A county hurling championships and 32 A county Football championships. The schools around the parish of Oranmore and Maree have fielded some successful GAA teams over the years with the Oranmore Boys National School winning the A county schools championship on a record 25 occasions in Football including 5 consecutive seasons (1995 to 1999).

In 2019, Oranmore–Maree pulled off a comeback against Charleville to win the All-Ireland Intermediate Club Hurling Championship for the first time in the club's history.

== Notable players ==
- Niall Burke
- Pat Malone
- Gearóid McInerney
- Conor Carroll (Roscommon county football team)

== Achievements ==
- Féile na nGael Christy Ring Trophy: (1) 2024
- All-Ireland Intermediate Club Hurling Championship: (1) 2019
- Galway Senior Hurling Championship: (1) 1933
- Galway Intermediate Hurling Championship: (3) 1953, 1990, 2018
- Galway Minor Hurling Championship: (6) 1963 (as Oranmore), 1970, 1989, 2022, 2023, 2025
- All-Ireland Senior Club Camogie Championship: (1) 1973-74
- Galway Senior Camogie Championship: (11) 1966, 1967, 1968, 1969, 1970, 1971, 1972, 1973, 1974, 1980, 1981
