= Ardrahan GAA =

Gaelic sports club in County Galway, Ireland

Ardrahan
- Ard Rathain
- Founded: 1884
- County: Galway
- Colours: Blue and White
- Grounds: Ardrahan

Playing kits
Standard colours

Senior Club Championships
	All Ireland	Connacht champions	Galway champions
Hurling:	0	3	11
Camogie:	-	-	2

Ardrahan GAA is a Gaelic Athletic Association club that is located in Ardrahan, County Galway, Ireland. The club was founded in 1884 and is almost exclusively concerned with the game of hurling.

== Honours ==
- Connacht Senior Club Hurling Championship (3): 1974, 1975, 1978
- Galway Senior Hurling Championship (11): 1894, 1895, 1896, 1901, 1902, 1903, 1910, 1949, 1974, 1975, 1978
- Galway Junior Hurling Championship (2): 1934, 1979
- Galway Intermediate Hurling Championship (3): 1947, 1949, 1965.
- Galway Under-21 Hurling Championship (1): 1977
- Galway Under-21 B Hurling Championship (1): 2001
- Galway Minor Hurling Championship (2): 1975, 1978
- Galway Senior Camogie Championship (2): 2013, 2018

== Notable players ==
- Bernie Forde
- Iarla Tannian
- Jonathan Glynn
