= Kilconieron GAA =

Kilconieron
- Cill Chon Iarainn
- Founded: 1885
- County: Galway
- Nickname: The Kills
- Colours: Green and yellow Blue and white
- Grounds: Pairc Cill Chon Iarainn

Playing kits
Green kit	Blue kit

Senior Club Championships
	All Ireland	Connacht champions	Galway champions
Hurling:	0	0	3

Kilconieron GAA is a Gaelic Athletic Association club located in the parish of Kilconieron, County Galway, Ireland. The club is primarily concerned with the game of hurling.

== History ==
Kilconieron was one of the first clubs in County Galway to affiliate with the Central Branch of the Gaelic Athletic Association. The first recorded game involving Kilconieron was against Kiltulla on 29 August 1885. Between 1908 and 1920, Kilconieron went through its most successful period. Seven Galway SHC finals were contested, with victories coming in 1908, 1912 and 1919.

A number of barren years followed, with the club facing a shortage of players on some occasions due to emigration. A split in the club occurred in 1943, with a breakaway club called St Finbarr's being established. The split lasted until 1947 when both clubs amalgamated under the Kilconieron name. The nearby Clostoken club amalgamated with Kilconieron in 1965.

The club enjoyed sporadic periods of juvenile and underage success in the decades that followed. The club claimed its first adult title in over 70 years when the Galway IHC title was claimed after a defeat of Beagh in 1993. Kilconieron won a second Galway IHC title after a defeat of Moycullen in the championship of 2020.

Booklets were produced on Kilconieron’s senior and intermediate title triumphs, for Heritage Week in 2024, titled Kilconieron 1908, Kilconieron 1911/12, Kilconieron 1919, Kilconieron 1993, and Kilconieron 2020.

== Honours ==
- Galway Senior Hurling Championship (3): 1908, 1912, 1919
- West Board Senior Hurling Championship (1): 1921
- Galway Intermediate Hurling Championship (3): 1911, 1993, 2020
- Galway U-21 A Hurling Championship (1): 1993
- Galway U-21 B Hurling Championship (3): 1981, 1991, 2015
- Galway U-20B Hurling Championship (1): 2024
- Kirwan Cup (1): 1907/08

== Notable player ==
- Liam Burke: All-Ireland U21HC-winner (1991, 1993(c))
