= Clarinbridge GAA =

Gaelic games club in County Galway, Ireland

Clarinbridge
- Droichead an Chláirín
- Founded: 1889
- County: Galway
- Colours: Maroon and White
- Grounds: Clarinbridge Park, Fleming's Field
- Coordinates: 53°13′50″N 8°52′29″W

Playing kits
Standard colours

Senior Club Championships
	All Ireland	Connacht champions	Galway champions
Hurling:	1	2	2

Clarinbridge GAA is a Gaelic Athletic Association club located in the village of Clarinbridge in County Galway, Ireland. The club is almost exclusively concerned with the game of hurling. In March 2011, they won their first All-Ireland Senior Club Hurling Championship, defeating O'Loughlin Gaels by 2-18 to 0-12 at Croke Park. Michael Donoghue was manager of that team.

== Honours ==
=== Hurling ===
- All-Ireland Senior Club Hurling Championships:
  - 2011
- Connacht Senior Club Hurling Championships:
  - 2001, 2010
- Galway Senior Club Hurling Championships:
  - 2001, 2010
- Galway Minor "A" Hurling Championships:
  - 1992, 1998, 2015, 2016, 2018
