= Ahascragh–Fohenagh GAA =

Gaelic sports club in County Galway, Ireland

Ahascragh–Fohenagh
- Founded: 1998
- County: Galway
- Colours: Blue, White, and Red
- Grounds: Fohenagh Sportsfield & Ahascragh GAA grounds

Playing kits
Standard colours

Ahascragh–Fohenagh GAA is a Gaelic Athletic Association club located in the two parishes of Fohenagh and Ahascragh, in east County Galway, Ireland. As of 2017, the club competes in the Galway Senior Hurling Championship, having gained Senior status for the first time in 2016.

== History ==
The joined club was initially formed at underage level in 1998 with the amalgamation of the neighbouring clubs of Fohenagh & Ahascragh and achieved success at U14, U15, and minor grades. The club joined at adult level in 2002.

== Notable players ==
- Cathal Mannion
- Pádraic Mannion

== Honours ==
- All-Ireland Intermediate Club Hurling Championship (0): Runners-Up 2017
- Connacht Intermediate Club Hurling Championship (1): 2016
- Galway Intermediate Hurling Championship (1): 2016
- Galway Junior C Hurling Championship (1): 2010
