= Pádraig Pearse's GAA =

Gaelic sports club in County Galway, Ireland

Pádraig Pearses
- Pádraig Mac Piarais
- Founded: 1966
- County: Galway
- Colours: Black and white
- Grounds: Ballymacward (Main Grounds & Clubhouse) & Gurteen.

Playing kits
Standard colours

Senior Club Championships
| | All Ireland | Connacht champions | Galway champions |
|---|---|---|---|
| Hurling: | 0 | 0 | 0 |
| Camogie: | 5 | - | 8 |

Pádraig Pearse's GAA is a Gaelic Athletic Association club located in the Ballymacward-Gurteen parish in County Galway, Ireland. The club was founded in 1966, when the Gurteen and Ballymacward Junior Hurling clubs merged. Hurling is the dominant sport in the club and the club also fields football teams. There has always been a strong tradition of hurling in the parish, with one of the earliest recordings in local press dated to 1882. The first club in the parish was officially affiliated to the G.A.A. in 1886.

Pádraig Pearse's GAA fields hurling teams from Under-6 to Senior level. Hurling Players from the club have represented Galway at all levels. In 2013 St Kerrill's Gaelic Football Club, which had been formed in 1990 and also representing the Ballymacward and Gurteen areas, was disbanded and Pádraig Pearses began fielding football teams. The adult football team compete at Junior level, with underage football teams competing in an amalgamation with Menlough GAA.

== Notable players ==
- Cyril Donnellan was member of 2017 Galway All-Ireland Senior Hurling Championship winning panel. Cyril made his debut for Galway in 2008 and also wonNational Hurling League titles in 2010 and 2017.
- Francis O'Brien played midfield on the Galway 1991 All-Ireland Under-21 Hurling Championship winning team. Galway defeated Offaly in the Final.
- Michael King was Sub Goalkeeper on the Galway's historic 1980 All-Ireland Senior Hurling Championship winning panel.
- Marty Barrett was a forward on the Galway's 1972 All-Ireland Under 21 Hurling Championship winning team and also on the 1975 National Hurling League winning team. He also won a Fitzgibbon Cup title in 1972 and went on to win a Dublin Senior Club Hurling Championship with St Brendan's GAA (Dublin).
- Fr Nicholas Murray, midfielder on Fohenagh's 1959 and 1960 Galway Senior Club Hurling Championship winning teams. 'Fr Nick' played Senior hurling with neighbouring Fohenagh, as there was no Senior Club in Ballymacward or Gurteen at the time.
- Tom Cogavin (Gurteen Hurling Club), was member on 1923 Galway All-Ireland Senior Hurling Championship winning panel.

== Honours ==
=== Hurling ===
- Galway Senior East Board Hurling Championship (1): 1969
- Galway Senior Hurling League (1): 2018
- Connacht Intermediate Club Hurling Championship (1): 2010
- Galway Intermediate Hurling Championship (4): 1979, 1991, 1995, 2010
- Galway Junior Hurling Championship (3): 1919 (Gurteen), 1941 (Ballymacward), 1967.
- Galway Junior B Club Hurling Championship (1): 2009
- Galway Under-21 B Hurling Championship (1): 2005
- Galway Under-20 B1 Hurling Championship (1): 2026
- Galway Minor A Hurling Championship (1): 1977
- Galway Minor B Hurling Championship (1): 2007
- Galway Minor B1 Hurling Championship (1): 2024

=== Football ===
- Galway Junior Football Championship (1): 2008 (St Kerrill's).

=== Pearses Camogie Club ===
- All-Ireland Senior Club Camogie Championship (5): 1996, 1997, 2000, 2001, 2002
- Galway Senior Camogie Championship (8): 1992, 1994, 1996, 1997, 1998, 2000, 2001, 2002
