= Kilnadeema–Leitrim GAA =

Gaelic games club in County Galway, Ireland

Kilnadeema–Leitrim Gaelic Athletic Club
- County: Galway
- Colours: Maroon, White and Blue

Playing kits
Standard colours

Kilnadeema–Leitrim GAA is a Gaelic Athletic Association club located in the Kilnadeema and Leitrim areas of County Galway, Ireland.

== History ==
The club is an amalgamation of the Kilnadeema and Leitrim clubs. Being founded by Daniel Casey, they joined in 1975.

== Achievements ==
Kilnadeema-Leitrim won their first U21A County Final on Sunday 8 February 2016, defeating their neighbours Loughrea by 0-12 to 0-6 at Duggan Park, Ballinasloe.

Kilnadeema–Leitrim reached the 2014 All-Ireland Intermediate Club Hurling Championship final, losing out to Rower–Inistioge after extra time.

- Galway Under-21 A Hurling Championship (1) 2015
- Connacht Intermediate Club Hurling Championship: (1) 2014
- All-Ireland Intermediate Club Hurling Championship: Runner-Up 2014
