= 2016 Galway Senior Hurling Championship =

Annual hurling competition season

Tournament details
- County: Galway
- Year: 2016

Winners
- Champions: St. Thomas'
- Manager: John Burke
- Captain: Patrick Skehill

Promotion/Relegation
- Promoted team(s): N/A
- Relegated team(s): Kiltormer

The 2016 Galway Senior Hurling Championship was the 119th staging of the Galway Senior Hurling Championship since its establishment in 1887. Sarsfields were the reigning champions. Abbeyknockmoy and Moycullen participated in the senior championship having been promoted from the intermediate competition in 2015.

== Fixtures and results ==
=== Group stage ===
The Senior A and Senior B Group stage draw was made on 8 March 2016 broadcast live on Galway Bay FM.

==== Senior A ====
Senior A consists of 12 teams divided into two groups of six. The top 2 teams from each group will automatically qualify for the quarter-finals. The 3rd and 4th teams from each group will play in preliminary quarter finals. The bottom two teams from each group will cross play with the losers playing in the Senior B competition in 2017.

===== Senior A - Group 1 =====
Pos	Team	Pld	W	D	L	SF	SA	Diff	Pts
1	Loughrea	5	4	0	1	5-86	3-77	15	8
2	Gort	5	3	1	1	9-76	4-85	6	7
3	Sarsfields	5	2	1	2	3-80	3-79	1	5
4	St. Thomas'	5	2	0	3	5-81	6-70	8	4
5	Castlegar	5	2	0	3	9-79	9-81	-1	4
6	Turloughmore	5	0	2	3	0-71	6-81	6	2

23 April 2016; 18:30; Round 1	Sarsfields	1-18 - 1-15	St. Thomas'	Kenny Park, Athenry; Referee: Alan Kelly
23 April 2016; 18:30; Round 1	N. Morrissey (0-8f), A. Ward (1-2), J. Cooney (0-4), N. Kelly (0-2), K. Cooney, N. Quinn (0-1) each		E. Burke (0-7, 3f), G. Murray (1-0), K. Burke (0-3), C. Cooney (0-2), B. Burke, J. Regan, G. Kelly (0-1) each	Kenny Park, Athenry; Referee: Alan Kelly

24 April 2016; 16:30; Round 1	Loughrea	1-17 - 0-18	Turloughmore	Kenny Park, Athenry; Referee: Christopher Browne
24 April 2016; 16:30; Round 1	N. keary 0-9(7f, 1'65), J. Ryan 1-1, J. Coen 0-2, P. Hoban, O. Coyle, S. O Brien, J. Maher, G.loughnane 0-1 each		C. O'Shaughnessey 0-7 (6f), J. Holland 0-4f, R. Badger, D. O'Shaughnessey 0-3 each, M. Murphy 0-1	Kenny Park, Athenry; Referee: Christopher Browne

24 April 2016; 18:00; Round 1	Castlegar	2-22 - 4-12	Gort	Kenny Park, Athenry; Referee: Eoin Shaughnessy
24 April 2016; 18:00; Round 1	G. Farragher 0-14(11f, 1'65), J. O Brien 0-4, E. Concannon, K. Keane 1-0 each, D. Barry, J. Coyne 0-2 each, J. O Gorman, P. O Flynn 0-1 each		W. Walsh 1-5(2f, 1'65), P. Killilea 2-0, R. Cummins 1-1, A. Harte 0-3, J. Grealish 0-2, A. Mullins 0-1	Kenny Park, Athenry; Referee: Eoin Shaughnessy

1 May 2016; 13:30; Round 2	Gort	2-14 - 1-14	Sarsfields	Loughrea; Referee: Chrisrty Browne
1 May 2016; 13:30; Round 2	Wayne Walsh (0-7, 0-3 frees, 0-2 '65s); Jason Grealish (0-4, 0-1 frees); Paul Killilea, Michael Mullins (1-0); Richie Cummins (0-2); Jack Grealish (0-1)		Niall Morrissey (1-10, 1-10 frees), Joseph Cooney (0-2), Noel Kelly, Kerrill Wade (0-1)	Loughrea; Referee: Chrisrty Browne

1 May 2016; 14:30; Round 2	Castlegar	2-15 - 0-12	Turloughmore	Pearse Stadium; Referee: Michael Haverty
1 May 2016; 14:30; Round 2	Ger Farragher (0-10, 0-7 frees); Jack Coyne (1-1); Enda Concannon (0-3); Kevin Keane (1-0); Kevin Brady (0-1)		Jamie Holland (0-4, 0-3 frees); Sean Loftus, Barry McDonagh (0-3); Kevin Hussey (0-2)	Pearse Stadium; Referee: Michael Haverty

1 May 2016; 17:30; Round 2	Loughrea	0-14 - 1-10	St. Thomas'	Kenny Park, Athenry; Referee: John Keane
1 May 2016; 17:30; Round 2	Neil Keary (0-10, 0-9 frees, 0-1 '65); Shane O'Brien (0-2); Emmet Mahony, Jamie Ryan (0-1)		Eanna Burke (0-5 frees); Bernard Burke (1-0); Conor Cooney (0-2); Fintan Burke, Brendan Farrell, Gerald Murray (0-1)	Kenny Park, Athenry; Referee: John Keane

7 May 2016; 18:00; Round 3	Loughrea	0-15 - 0-14	Sarsfields	Duggan Park, Ballinasloe; Referee: John McDonagh
7 May 2016; 18:00; Round 3	Neil Keary (0-8, 0-6 frees); Jamie Ryan (0-3); Gearoid Loughnane, Emmet Mahony, Johnny Coen, Shane O'Brien (0-1)		Kerril Wade (0-6 frees); Niall Morrissey (0-4, 0-3 frees); Noel Kelly (0-2); Ian Skehill, Joseph Cooney, Kevin Cooney (0-1)	Duggan Park, Ballinasloe; Referee: John McDonagh

7 May 2016; 19:00; Round 3	St. Thomas'	1-19 - 4-9	Castlegar	Kenny Park, Athenry
7 May 2016; 19:00; Round 3	Eanna Burke (0-11, 0-8 frees, 0-1 '65); David Burke (1-3); Conor Cooney (0-2, 0-1 frees); Donal Cooney, James Regan, Bernard Burke (0-1)		Enda Concannon (1-3); Ger Farragher (0-5, 0-3 frees, 0-1 '65), Kevin Keane (1-1); Jack Coyne, Padraig O'Flynn (1-0)	Kenny Park, Athenry

8 May 2016; 19:00; Round 3	Turloughmore	0-14 - 1-11	Gort	Kenny Park, Athenry; Referee: John Keane
8 May 2016; 19:00; Round 3	Jamie Holland (0-7, 0-6 frees);Conor Shaughnessey (0-3, 0-2 frees); Sean Linnane (0-2); Brian Murphy, Barry McDonagh (0-1)		Jason Grealish (1-4); Wayne Walsh (0-4, 0-3 frees); Aiden Helebert (0-2); Niall Forde (0-1)	Kenny Park, Athenry; Referee: John Keane

22 May 2016; 13:30; Round 4	Sarsfields	1-15 - 0-18	Turloughmore	Loughrea; Referee: Sean Moran
22 May 2016; 13:30; Round 4	Niall Morrissey (0-7, 0-4 frees); Niall Quinn (1-0); Alan Ward (0-3); Joseph Cooney, Noel Kelly (0-2); Kevin Cooney (0-1)		Conor Shaughnessy (0-6, 0-4 frees); Jamie Holland (0-3 frees); Dathai Burke, Fergal Moore, Barry McDonagh (0-2); Sean Linnane, Ronan Badger, Gary Burke (0-1)	Loughrea; Referee: Sean Moran

22 May 2016; 15:30; Round 4	Loughrea	4-19 - 1-16	Castlegar	Gort; Referee: John McDonagh
22 May 2016; 15:30; Round 4	Johnny Coen (2-3, 1-0 penalty); Neil Keary (0-5, 0-2 frees); Gearoid Loughnane (0-4); Paul Hoban (0-3); Shane O'Brien, Joseph Mooney (1-0); Jamie Ryan (0-2, 0-1 sideline); Emmet Mahony, Johnny Maher (0-1)		Ger Farragher (1-7, 1-0 penalty, 0-5 frees, 0-2 '65s); Dean Higgins (0-3); Enda Concannon (0-2); Donall Barry, Kevin Brady, Jack Coyne, Jason O'Gorman (0-1)	Gort; Referee: John McDonagh

22 May 2016; 18:00; Round 4	Gort	1-20 - 1-14	St. Thomas'	Kenny Park, Athenry
22 May 2016; 18:00; Round 4	Aiden Helebert (0-9, 0-8 frees, 0-1 '65); Paul Killilea (1-2); Jason Grealish (0-3, 0-1 free); Richie Cummins, Michael Mullins (0-2); Aidan Harte, Gerard Quinn (0-1)		Eanna Burke (0-7, 0-6 frees); Anthony Kelly (1-1); David Burke (0-2); Darragh Burke (0-2, 0-1 free, 0-1 '65); Donal Cooney, Brendan Farrell (0-1)	Kenny Park, Athenry

9 July 2016; 17:00; Round 5	Sarsfields	0-19 - 0-17	Castlegar	Gort; Referee: John Keane
9 July 2016; 17:00; Round 5	Niall Morrissey (0-11, 0-9 frees, 0-1 '65); Joseph Cooney (0-5); Kevin Cooney (0-2); Ivan Kenny (0-1)		Jack Coyne (0-5, 0-3 frees); Ger Farragher (0-4, 0-3 frees, 0-1 '65); Sean Connolly (0-4); Jason O'Gorman (0-3); Enda Concannon (0-1)	Gort; Referee: John Keane

9 July 2016; 17:00; Round 5	St. Thomas'	1-23 - 0-9	Turloughmore	Kenny Park, Athenry; Referee: Shane Hynes
9 July 2016; 17:00; Round 5	Conor Cooney (0-13, 0-7 frees, 0-1 '65); Damien Finnerty (1-0); Bernard Burke, David Burke, James Regan (0-2); Shane Cooney, Eanna Burke, Darragh Burke, Gerald Murray (0-1)		Conor Shaughnessy (0-4 frees); Dathai Burke (0-2 frees); Barry McDonagh (0-2); Gary Burke (0-1)	Kenny Park, Athenry; Referee: Shane Hynes

9 July 2016; 17:00; Round 5	Gort	1-19 - 0-21	Loughrea	Duggan Park, Ballinasloe; Referee: Sean Moran
9 July 2016; 17:00; Round 5	Aiden Helebert (0-15, 0-12 frees); Richard Cummins (1-1); Aidan Harte, Sylvie Linnane, Jason Grealish (0-1)		Gearoid Loughnane (0-7, 0-4 frees); Jamie Ryan (0-4); Shane O'Brien (0-3); Joseph Mooney, Johnny Coen (0-2); Thomas Hoban, Kenneth Cormican (0-1); Brian Mahony (0-1 free)	Duggan Park, Ballinasloe; Referee: Sean Moran

===== Senior A - Group 2 =====
Pos	Team	Pld	W	D	L	SF	SA	Diff	Pts
1	Portumna	5	4	1	0	6-85	3-75	19	9
2	Craughwell	5	4	0	1	8-84	4-72	24	8
3	Cappataggle	5	2	1	2	8-80	6-71	15	5
4	Padraig Pearses	5	2	0	3	7-72	5-88	-10	4
5	Ardrahan	5	1	0	4	3-70	11-82	-36	2
6	Liam Mellows	5	1	0	4	7-72	10-75	-12	2

23 April 2016; 17:00; Round 1	Padraig Pearses	2-12 - 0-16	Ardrahan	Kenny Park, Athenry; Referee: Michael Dolan
23 April 2016; 17:00; Round 1	C. Donnellan(1-1f), E. Ward 1-2 each, T. Flannery 0-3(2f), R. Bellew 0-2(1f), K. Hardiman, J. Gelston, C. Raftery 0-1 each		G. Hennelly 0-7f, P. Mcrann 0-3, C. Walsh 0-2, J. O Leary(1f), J. Kennedy, L. Forde, C. Fahy 0-1 each	Kenny Park, Athenry; Referee: Michael Dolan

23 April 2016
17:00
Round 1
Cappataggle
2-15 - 1-12
Liam Mellows
Gort
Referee: Gerry Donoghue
D. Nevin 0-8(5f, 2 sideline, 1'65), J. Mannion 2-1, J. Egan 0-2, P. Egan, P. Claffey, A. Dolan, D. Joyce 0-1 each

A. Callanan 1-3, T. Haran 0-4(3f), E.

Fallon 0-3, C. Hynes, A. Morrissey(f) 0-1 each

24 April 2016; 12:00; Round 1	Portumna	2-13 - 0-16	Craughwell	Loughrea; Referee: John Keane
24 April 2016; 12:00; Round 1	R. O Meara 0-8(3f), P. Dolphin 2-1, A. Smith 0-2(1f), I. Canning, O. Canning 0-1 each		N. Healy 0-7(6f), K. Cullinane 0-4, F. Healy 0-3, A. Callanan, T. Monahan 0-1 each	Loughrea; Referee: John Keane

30 April 2016; 19:00; Round 2	Craughwell	1-21 - 0-15	Padraig Pearses	Kenny Park, Athenry; Referee: Alan Kelly
30 April 2016; 19:00; Round 2	Niall Healy (0-9, 0-3 frees); Kealan Cullinane (0-4); Mark Horan (0-3); Michael Farrell (1-0); Alan Callanan (0-2); James Greaney, John Ryan, Thomas Monaghan (0-1)		Tomás Flannery (0-9, 0-8 frees); Eric Ward (0-2); Kerrill Hardiman, Jimmy Gelston, Lee Murphy, Ronan Bellew (0-1)	Kenny Park, Athenry; Referee: Alan Kelly

1 May 2016; 16:00; Round 2	Cappataggle	6-20 - 1-11	Ardrahan	Duggan Park, Ballinasloe; Referee: John McDonagh
1 May 2016; 16:00; Round 2	Jarlath Mannion (3-3); Daniel Nevin (0-9, 0-5 frees, 0-2 sidelines); Mark Loughnane (1-1); Ronan Garvey, Eanna Garvey (1-0); Alan Dolan, James Egan (0-2); Paul Claffey (0-1 free); Alan Loughnane, Darragh Dolan (0-1)		Gerry Hennelly (0-8, 0-7 frees); Iarla Tannian (1-1); Pearse McCrann, Cian Walsh (0-1)	Duggan Park, Ballinasloe; Referee: John McDonagh

1 May 2016; 18:30; Round 2	Portumna	0-16 - 1-12	Liam Mellows	Kenny Park, Athenry; Referee: Derek Kelly
1 May 2016; 18:30; Round 2	Ronan O'Meara (0-8, 0-2 frees); Joe Canning (0-6, 0-4 frees); Ollie Canning, Sean Heagney (0-1)		Conor Kavanagh (1-2); Tadhg Haran (0-4, 0-2 frees); Ronan Elwood (0-2, 0-1 free); Enda Fallon (0-2); David Fahy, Aonghus Callanan (0-1)	Kenny Park, Athenry; Referee: Derek Kelly

7 May 2016; 19:30; Round 3	Portumna	2-14 - 0-20	Cappataggle	Duggan Park, Ballinasloe; Referee: Michael Dolan
7 May 2016; 19:30; Round 3	Joe Canning (0-6 frees); Ronan O'Meara (1-1); Andy Smith (0-3); Patrick Dolphin (1-0); Ivan Canning (0-2); Damien Hayes, Kevin Hayes (0-1)		Daniel Nevin (0-12, 0-9 frees, 0-1 '65); Damien Joyce (0-3); Jaralath Mannion (0-2); James Egan, Alan Dolan (0-1); James Skehill (0-1 free)	Duggan Park, Ballinasloe; Referee: Michael Dolan

8 May 2016; 15:30; Round 3	Liam Mellows	4-20 - 2-14	Padraig Pearses	Pearse Stadium; Referee: Eoin Shaughnessy
8 May 2016; 15:30; Round 3	Tadhg Haran (3-6, 0-3 frees); Ronan Elwood (0-6); Aonghus Callanan (1-1); Conor Hynes (0-2); David Collins, Kevin Lee, Enda Fallon, Conor Kavanagh, Stephen Barrett (0-1)		Tomas Flannery (1-6 frees); Brian Sweeney (1-0); Cormac Ward, Cormac Raftery, Gareth Lally (0-2); Ronan Bellew, Shane Raftery (0-1)	Pearse Stadium; Referee: Eoin Shaughnessy

8 May 2016; 17:30; Round 3	Craughwell	1-17 - 1-13	Ardrahan	Kenny Park, Athenry; Referee: Christopher Browne
8 May 2016; 17:30; Round 3	Niall Healy (0-10, 0-5 frees, 0-1 '65); Alan Callanan (1-1); Kealan Cullinane (0-2); Adrian Cullinane, Niall Callanan, Tomas Monaghan, Shane Dolan (0-1)		Gerry Hennelly (1-6, 1-0 penalty, 0-4 frees, 0-1 '65); Pearse McCrann, Cian Walsh (0-2); Joe O'Leary, Cianan Fahy, Jason Kennedy (0-1)	Kenny Park, Athenry; Referee: Christopher Browne

21 May 2016; 17:30; Round 4	Craughwell	1-13 - 0-13	Cappataggle	Kenny Park, Athenry; Referee: Leonard Fay
21 May 2016; 17:30; Round 4	Niall Healy (0-10, 0-9 frees); Alan Callanan (1-0); Kealan Cullinane (0-2); Shane Dolan (0-1)		Daniel Nevin (0-9, 0-7 frees, 0-1 '65); Patrick Egan, Daniel Reddan, Eanna Garvey, Jarlath Mannion (0-1)	Kenny Park, Athenry; Referee: Leonard Fay

22 May 2016; 12:00; Round 4	Ardrahan	1-13 - 0-10	Liam Mellows	Loughrea; Referee: Christy Browne
22 May 2016; 12:00; Round 4	Jason Kennedy (1-0); Pearse McCrann (0-3); Cianan Fahy (0-2, 0-1 free); Cian Walsh (0-2 frees); Gerard Forde, Shane Cosgrove, David Kennedy, Cormac Diviney, Liam Forde, Iarla Tannion (0-1)		Tadhg Haran (0-5, 0-3 frees); Adrian Morrissey (0-3, 0-2 frees); Conor Hynes, Conor Kavanagh (0-1)	Loughrea; Referee: Christy Browne

22 May 2016; 14:30; Round 4	Portumna	0-19 - 2-10	Padraig Pearses	Duggan Park, Ballinasloe; Referee: Gerry Donoghue
22 May 2016; 14:30; Round 4	Joe Canning (0-12, 0-9 frees); Damien Hayes (0-4); Andy Smith, Ivan Canning, Ronan O'Meara (0-1)		Tomas Flannery (0-7, 0-6 frees, 0-1 '65); Lee Murphy (2-1); Kerrill Hardiman (0-1 free); Damien Wynne (0-1)	Duggan Park, Ballinasloe; Referee: Gerry Donoghue

9 July 2016; 18:30; Round 5	Padraig Pearses	1-21 - 0-12	Cappataggle	Duggan Park, Ballinasloe; Referee: Alan Kelly
9 July 2016; 18:30; Round 5	Tomas Flannery (0-11, 0-9 frees); Jimmy Gelston (1-0); Cyril Donnelan, Sean Hardiman (0-2); Kerrill Hardiman, Gareth Lally (0-1)		Daniel Nevin (0-7, 0-4 frees); James Skehill (0-2 frees); James Egan, Jarlath Mannion (0-1)	Duggan Park, Ballinasloe; Referee: Alan Kelly

9 July 2016; 18:30; Round 5	Craughwell	5-17 - 1-18	Liam Mellows	Kenny Park, Athenry; Referee: Leonard Fay
9 July 2016; 18:30; Round 5	Jamie Ryan (5-0); Niall Healy (0-6, 0-4 frees); Shane Hynes, Thomas Monaghan, Cian Larkin (0-2); John Ryan, Niall Callanan, Fergal Healy, Mark Horan, Shane Dolan (0-1)		Adrian Morrissey (0-11, 0-8 frees, 0-1 '65); Tadhg Haran (0-4); Aonghus Callanan (1-0); Kevin Lee (0-2); Sean Morrissey (0-1)	Kenny Park, Athenry; Referee: Leonard Fay

9 July 2016; 18:30; Round 5	Portumna	2-23 - 0-17	Ardrahan	Gort; Referee: Eoin Shaughnessy
9 July 2016; 18:30; Round 5	Joe Canning (0-9, 0-5 frees); Ronan O'Meara (1-4, 0-1 free); Damien Hayes (0-3); Colin Burke (1-0); Andy Smith, Kevin Hayes (0-2); Martin Dolphin, Oisin Royston, John Madden (0-1)		Gerry Hennelly (0-11, 0-9 frees, 0-1 '65); Iarla Tannian, Cian Walsh (0-2); Gerard Forde, Cianan Fahy (0-1)	Gort; Referee: Eoin Shaughnessy

===== Senior A - Relegation =====
8 October 2016; 14:30; Senior A - Relegation	Turloughmore	1-20 - 1-16	Ardrahan	Kenny Park, Athenry; Referee: Eoin Shaughnessy
8 October 2016; 14:30; Senior A - Relegation	Sean Loftus 1-3 (1-0 sideline), Jamie Holland 0-5 (3f), Richard Doyle (2f), Sean Linnane, Cian Burke 0-3 each, Conor Shaughnessy, Ronan Badger (1f), Matthew Keating 0-1 each		Gerry Hennelly 0-12f, Liam Forde 1-1, Maurice Callanan, Cianan Fahy, Conor Cosgrove 0-1 each	Kenny Park, Athenry; Referee: Eoin Shaughnessy

15 October 2016; 14:30; Senior A - Relegation	Liam Mellows	1-20 - 0-15	Castlegar	Kenny Park, Athenry; Referee: John Keane

==== Senior B ====
Senior B consists of 12 teams divided into two groups of 6. The top teams from each group will qualify for preliminary quarter finals and play in the Senior A competition in 2017. The four 2nd and 3rd placed teams will cross play with the winners also qualifying for preliminary quarter finals.

===== Senior B - Group 1 =====
Pos	Team	Pld	W	D	L	SF	SA	Diff	Pts
1	Tommy Larkin's	5	5	0	0	4-81	2-55	32	10
2	Abbeyknockmoy	5	3	0	2	5-82	5-71	11	6
3	Beagh	5	2	1	2	8-70	4-62	20	5
4	Killimordaly	5	2	1	2	7-80	7-75	5	5
5	Moycullen	5	2	0	1	8-62	7-78	-13	4
6	Kiltormer	5	0	0	5	1-56	8-80	-55	0

23 April 2016; 18:30; Round 1	Tommy Larkin's	0-14 - 0-13	Beagh	Duggan Park, Ballinasloe; Referee: Michael Conway
23 April 2016; 18:30; Round 1	J. Flynn 0-11, C. Gardiner 0-2, S. Keon 0-1		P. Landers, R. Gantly 0-4 each, K. Keehan 0-3, J. Gantly, J. Moylan 0-1 each	Duggan Park, Ballinasloe; Referee: Michael Conway

23 April 2016; 19:00; Round 1	Abbeyknockmoy	1-17 - 1-14	Moycullen	Pearse Stadium; Referee: Shane Hynes
23 April 2016; 19:00; Round 1	P. Flaherty 0-8(4f), E. Blade 0-4, C. Kennedy 1-0, C. Maher 0-2, T. Mullins, C. Mulry, D. Mullins 0-1 each		N. Mannion 1-5(5f, 1pen), C. Bohan, D. Kelly 0-2 each, M. Lydon, V. Flaherty, E. Noone, P. Lydon, S. Coneely 0-1 each	Pearse Stadium; Referee: Shane Hynes

24 April 2016; 16:00; Round 1	Killimordaly	1-18 - 0-13	Kiltormer	Duggan Park, Ballinasloe; Referee: Derek Kelly
24 April 2016; 16:00; Round 1	Brian Concannon 0-5 (1f), Iomar Creaven 1-1, Brian Burke 0-3, David Concannon, Tommy Madden 0-2 each, Keith Kennedy(f), Conor Daly, Andrew Daly, Éanna Ryan, Darragh Cooney 0-1 each		D. Claffey 0-9f, D. Hopkins 0-2, M. Dolan, M. Glynn 0-1 each	Duggan Park, Ballinasloe; Referee: Derek Kelly

29 April 2016; 19:00; Round 2	Tommy Larkin's	1-17 - 1-9	Moycullen	Kenny Park, Athenry; Referee: Pat Greene
29 April 2016; 19:00; Round 2	Jason Flynn (1-11, 0-6 frees, 0-1 '65, 0-1 sideline); Conor Gardiner, Kevin Hooban (0-2); Niall Kelly, Kevin McHugo (0-1)		Niall Mannion (1-8, 0-6 frees); Eanna Noone (0-1)	Kenny Park, Athenry; Referee: Pat Greene

2 May 2016; 19:00; Round 2	Killimordaly	2-19 - 0-16	Abbeyknockmoy	Duggan Park, Ballinasloe; Referee: Gerry Donoghue
2 May 2016; 19:00; Round 2	Brian Burke (1-11, 0-3 '65s, 0-7 frees); Eanna Ryan (0-3); Brian Concannon (1-0); Tommy Madden (0-2); David Concannon, Iomar Craven, Darragh Cooney (0-1)		Paul Flaherty (0-9, 0-6 frees); Brian Flaherty (0-3); Damien Rooney (0-2); Danny Mullins, Fionnán Garvey (0-1)	Duggan Park, Ballinasloe; Referee: Gerry Donoghue

14 May 2016; 19:00; Round 2	Beagh	1-16 - 0-6	Kiltormer	Loughrea; Referee: Peter Murphy
14 May 2016; 19:00; Round 2	Rory Gantley (0-6 frees); Joe Gantley (0-4); John Moylan (1-0); Adrian Touhy (0-2); Tommy McKeown, Eoin Mahon, Padraig Landers (0-1); Kevin Keehan (0-1 free)		Diarmuid Claffey (0-2 frees); Keith Kilkenny, Derek Dervin (0-1 free); Darren Hopkins, Patrick Cormican (0-1)	Loughrea; Referee: Peter Murphy

6 May 2016; 20:00; Round 3	Tommy Larkin's	1-13 - 0-12	Abbeyknockmoy	Duggan Park, Ballinasloe
6 May 2016; 20:00; Round 3	Jason Flynn (0-9, 0-1 frees); Stephen Keon (1-0); Conor Gardiner (0-2); Niall Kelly, Kevin Hooban (0-1)		Paul Flaherty (0-7, 0-6 frees); Danny Mullins (0-2); Trevor Mullins, Damien Rooney, Greg Kennedy (0-1)	Duggan Park, Ballinasloe

7 May 2016; 17:30; Round 3	Beagh	3-14 - 2-17	Killimordaly	Kenny Park, Athenry; Referee: Paul Fahy
7 May 2016; 17:30; Round 3	John Moylan (2-2); Rory Gantley (0-7, 0-5 frees, 0-1 '65); Joe Gantley (1-1); Padraig Landers (0-2); Tommy McKeown, Adrian Tuohy (0-1)		Brian Burke (0-7, 0-6 frees); Iomar Creaven (2-1); Tommy Madden (0-3); Brian Concannon (0-2); David Concannon, Andrew Daly, Eanna Ryan, Darragh Cooney (0-1)	Kenny Park, Athenry; Referee: Paul Fahy

8 May 2016; 13:30; Round 3	Moycullen	3-15 - 1-17	Kiltormer	Loughrea; Referee: Michael Conway
8 May 2016; 13:30; Round 3	Philip Lydon (2-3); Eanna Noone (0-4, 0-1 frees); Niall Mannion (0-4, 0-3 frees); Seamus Coneeley (1-1); Conor Bohan (0-2); Gary Bohan (0-1)		Diarmuid Claffey (0-10, 0-8 frees); Dean Flynn (1-1); Darren Hopkins (0-3); Martin Glynn (0-2); Keith Kilkenny (0-1)	Loughrea; Referee: Michael Conway

21 May 2016; 19:00; Round 4	Moycullen	2-14 - 1-14	Killimordaly	Kenny Park, Athenry; Referee: Eoin Shaughnessy
21 May 2016; 19:00; Round 4	Niall Mannion (1-6, 0-4 frees); Eanna Noone (0-4, 0-1 free, 0-2 sidelines); Seamus Conneely (1-0); Conor Bohan (0-2); Mark Lydon, Dan Kelly (0-1)		Brian Burke (0-6, 0-3 frees); Darragh Cooney (0-3); Shane Concannon (1-0); David Concannon (0-2); Andrew Daly, Tommy Madden, Iomar Creaven (0-1)	Kenny Park, Athenry; Referee: Eoin Shaughnessy

22 May 2016; 16:00; Round 4	Tommy Larkin's	0-19 - 0-10	Kiltormer	Duggan Park, Ballinasloe; Referee: Mike Dolan
22 May 2016; 16:00; Round 4	Jason Flynn (0-11, 0-9 frees); Conor Gardiner, Ronan Murphy (0-3); Colm Flynn, Kevin McHugo (0-1)		Derek Dervan (0-7, 0-3 frees); Damien Dolan (0-2); Michael Dolan (0-1)	Duggan Park, Ballinasloe; Referee: Mike Dolan

22 May 2016; 17:30; Round 4	Abbeyknockmoy	1-15 - 1-14	Beagh	Kenny Park, Athenry; Referee: Paul Fahy
22 May 2016; 17:30; Round 4	Brian Flaherty (1-1, 0-1 free); Paul Flaherty (0-4, 0-3 frees); Fionnan Garvey (0-3); Damien Rooney, Craig Kennedy (0-2); Danny Mullins, Eoin Blade, Padraig O'Donnell (0-1)		Rory Gantley (0-6 frees); John Moylan (1-1); Adrian Tuohy, Joe Gantley (0-2); Eoin Mahon, Kevin Keehan, Padraig Landers (0-1)	Kenny Park, Athenry; Referee: Paul Fahy

8 July 2016; 19:30; Round 5	Abbeyknockmoy	3-22 - 0-10	Kiltormer	Loughrea; Referee: Kevin Egan
8 July 2016; 19:30; Round 5	Paul Flaherty (1-9, 0-3 frees); Padraig O'Donnell (1-2); Eoin Blade (0-4); Craig Kennedy (1-1); Damien Rooney, Danny Mullins (0-2); Trevor Mullins, Caelom Mulry (0-1)		Derek Dervin (0-7, 0-5 frees); Michael Dolan, Partick Cormican, Sean Claffey (0-1);	Loughrea; Referee: Kevin Egan

8 July 2016; 19:30; Round 5	Beagh	3-13 - 1-10	Moycullen	Kenny Park, Athenry; Referee: Richard McNicholas
8 July 2016; 19:30; Round 5	Kevin Keehan (2-2); Rory Gantley (0-4 frees); Joe Gantley (1-2); Padraig Landers (0-2); Tommy McKeown, Adrian Diviney, Adrian Tuohy (0-1)		Niall Mannion (0-4, 0-1 free); Seamus Conneely (1-1); Mark Lydon, Phillip Lydon, Dan Kelly, Conor Bohan, Chris Hurney (0-1)	Kenny Park, Athenry; Referee: Richard McNicholas

8 July 2016; 19:30; Round 5	Tommy Larkin's	2-18 - 1-11	Killimordaly	Duggan Park, Ballinasloe; Referee: Ger O'Connor
8 July 2016; 19:30; Round 5	Jason Flynn (1-7, 0-4 frees); Ronan Murphy (1-4); Niall Kelly (0-2); Colm Flynn, Kevin McHugo, Eugene Gorman, Conor Gardiner, Stephen Keon (0-1)		Brian Concannon (1-4, 0-1 frees); Iomar Creaven, Andrew Daly (0-2); Conor McDonagh, Niall O'Kane, Darragh Cooney (0-1)	Duggan Park, Ballinasloe; Referee: Ger O'Connor

===== Senior B - Group 2 =====
Pos	Team	Pld	W	D	L	SF	SA	Diff	Pts
1	Mullagh	5	3	2	0	4-80	2-72	14	8
2	Tynagh-Abbey/Duniry	5	4	0	1	9-83	3-57	44	8
3	Kilnadeema-Leitrim	5	3	1	1	6-88	5-72	19	7
4	Athenry	5	2	0	3	6-79	3-79	9	4
5	Clarinbridge	5	1	1	3	1-71	5-82	-23	3
6	Carnmore	5	0	0	5	1-61	8-102	-62	0

23 April 2016; 17:00; Round 1	Tynagh-Abbey/Duniry	2-22 - 0-9	Carnmore	Duggan Park, Ballinasloe; Referee: Kevin Egan
23 April 2016; 17:00; Round 1	S. Maloney 1-7, P. Gordon 1-2, P. Brehony 0-4, M. Dervan 0-2, P. Kileen, P. Mchugo, S. Farrell, R. Madden, P. Robinson, N. Maloney, S. Farrell 0-1 each		B. Hanley 0-8, J.P. O'connell 0-1	Duggan Park, Ballinasloe; Referee: Kevin Egan

23 April 2016; 18:30; Round 1	Kilnadeema-Leitrim	2-17 - 0-12	Clarinbridge	Gort; Referee: Liam Gordon
23 April 2016; 18:30; Round 1	B. Molloy 0-11(6f), D. Tierney 1-2, D. Towalwai 1-0, T. Tierney, J. Kenny, S. Lawless, M. Lynch 0-1 each		E. Niland 0-5(4f), B. Daly, A. Armstrong, S. Kilduff 0-2 each, B. Lane 0-1	Gort; Referee: Liam Gordon

24 April 2016; 14:30; Round 1	Mullagh	2-18 - 0-15	Athenry	Duggan Park, Ballinasloe; Referee: Michael Haverty
24 April 2016; 14:30; Round 1	C. Dervan 1-8(6f, 1-0pen), F. Coone 1-4, S. Cahalan 0-4, F. Hardiman, D. Glennon 0-1 each		R. Hardiman 0-8f, C. Burke 0-2, P. Hannon, M. Hannon D. Fahy, M. Mullins, C. Cannon 0-1 each	Duggan Park, Ballinasloe; Referee: Michael Haverty

30 April 2016; 19:00; Round 2	Tynagh-Abbey/Duniry	4-13 - 1-12	Kilnadeema-Leitrim	Duggan Park, Ballinasloe; Referee: Eoin Shaughnessy
30 April 2016; 19:00; Round 2	Shane Maloney (1-6, 1-0 penalty, 0-5 frees); Paul Gordan (1-2); Colm Larkin (1-1); Padraig Robinson (1-0); Padraig Brehony (0-2); Paul Killeen, Ronan Madden, John Brehony (0-1)		Brian Molloy (1-10, 1-8 frees, 0-1 '65); Mikey Lynch, Shane Lawless (0-1)	Duggan Park, Ballinasloe; Referee: Eoin Shaughnessy

2 May 2016; 14:00; Round 2	Athenry	2-17 - 0-11	Carnmore	Turloughmore; Referee: Shane Hynes
2 May 2016; 14:00; Round 2	Ronan Hardiman (0-7, 0-5 frees); Michael Mullins (1-4, 0-1 free); Cian Burke (1-3); Cathal Keane (0-2); Patrick Hannon, Stephen Kelly (0-1)		Gary Grealish (0-2); George Hanley (0-2, 0-1 sideline); Ben Murray (0-2, 0-1 free); Kevin Killilea, Barry Hanley (0-1 free); Darren Fahy, Keegan Fox, Paul Fox (0-1)	Turloughmore; Referee: Shane Hynes

13 May 2016; 19:15; Round 2	Clarinbridge	0-13 - 0-13	Mullagh	Kenny Park, Athenry; Referee: Adrian Mooney
13 May 2016; 19:15; Round 2	Evan Niland (0-8, 0-5 frees); Patrick Foley, Barry Keane (0-2); Billy Lane (0-1)		Cathal Dervan (0-10, 0-8 frees, 0-2 '65s); Niall Cahalane (0-2); Kevin Briscoe (0-1)	Kenny Park, Athenry; Referee: Adrian Mooney

6 May 2016; 19:30; Round 3	Clarinbridge	1-20 - 0-12	Carnmore	Kenny Park, Athenry; Referee: Peter Campbell
6 May 2016; 19:30; Round 3	Evan Niland (1-12, 0-10 frees); Sean Kilduff (0-2); Brian Burke, Eoin Forde, Barry Daly, Christopher Bannon, Patrick Foley, Niall Armstrong (0-1)		Barry Hanley (0-10, 0-6 frees, 0-2 '65s); Darren Fahy, George Hanley (0-1)	Kenny Park, Athenry; Referee: Peter Campbell

7 May 2016; 18:30; Round 3	Tynagh-Abbey/Duniry	0-17 - 1-11	Athenry	Gort; Referee: Ger O'Connor
7 May 2016; 18:30; Round 3	Shane Maloney (0-9, 0-5 frees, 0-1 '65); Padraig Brehony (0-3), Ronan Madden (0-3, 0-1 free); Paul Gordan, Padraig Robinson (0-1)		Ronan Hardiman (0-7, 0-6 frees, 0-1 '65); Michael Mullins (1-0); Cian Burke (0-2); Conor Burke, Conor Caulfield (0-1)	Gort; Referee: Ger O'Connor

8 May 2016; 17:00; Round 3	Mullagh	0-16 - 0-16	Kilnadeema-Leitrim	Killimor; Referee: Alan Kelly
8 May 2016; 17:00; Round 3	Conor Dervan (0-7, 0-6 frees); David Glennon, Finnan Coone (0-2); Kevin Briscoe, Paddy Hardiman, Niall Cahalane, Stephen Cahalane, Donal Reilly (0-1)		Brian Molloy (0-8, 0-5 frees, 0-1 '65); Tom Tierney (0-2, 0-1 free); Ciaran Connor, Jack Kenny, Mikey Lynch, Shane Lawless, Dara Herlihy, Dylan Towolawi (0-1)	Killimor; Referee: Alan Kelly

20 May 2016; 19:30; Round 4	Tynagh-Abbey/Duniry	3-15 - 0-11	Clarinbridge	Kenny Park, Athenry; Referee: Ger O'Connor
20 May 2016; 19:30; Round 4	Shane Maloney (1-6, 0-3 frees, 0-1 '65); Paul Gordon (1-3); Padraig Robinson (1-1); Padraig Breheny (0-2); Colm Larkin, Shane Farrell, Niall Maloney (0-1)		Evan Niland (0-8, 0-6 frees, 0-1 '65); Thomas Jakeman, Eoin Forde, Christopher Bannon (0-1)	Kenny Park, Athenry; Referee: Ger O'Connor

21 May 2016; 16:00; Round 4	Mullagh	1-19 - 1-15	Carnmore	Loughrea; Referee: Seamus Moran
21 May 2016; 16:00; Round 4	Cathal Dervan (0-10, 0-7 frees); Stephen Cahalane (1-1); David Glennon (0-4); Donal Reilly (0-3); Damien Monaghan (0-1)		B Hanley (0-9, 0-8 frees); Martin Kelly (1-1); Ben Murray (0-2); Gary Grealish (0-1 free); Kevin Killilea, Alan Traynor (0-1)	Loughrea; Referee: Seamus Moran

21 May 2016; 19:00; Round 4	Kilnadeema-Leitrim	1-18 - 1-17	Athenry	Gort; Referee: John Keane
21 May 2016; 19:00; Round 4	Brian Molloy (0-13, 0-12 frees, 0-1 '65); Shane Lawless (1-0); David Tierney (0-2); Dara Herlihy, Tom Tierney, Mikey Lynch (0-1)		Ronan Hardiman (0-7, 0-6 frees, 0-1 '65); Cathal Keane (1-2, 1-0 free); Cian Burke (0-3); Mark Hannon, Michael Mullins (0-2); Jack Carr (0-1)	Gort; Referee: John Keane

12 June 2016; 18:00; Round 5	Athenry	2-19 - 0-15	Clarinbridge	Referee: Joe Larkin
12 June 2016; 18:00; Round 5	Cathal Keane (1-7, 0-3 frees, 0-3 '65s); Cian Burke (1-2); Conor Caulfield (0-3); Michael Mullins, David Donoghue (0-2); Mark Hannon, Patrick Hannon, Jack Carr (0-1)		Evan Niland (0-11, 0-8 frees); Steven Forde, Alan Armstrong, Christopher Bannon, Eoin Forde (0-1)	Referee: Joe Larkin

8 July 2016; 19:30; Round 5	Kilnadeema-Leitrim	2-25 - 0-14	Carnmore	Craughwell; Referee: Ronan Stankard
8 July 2016; 19:30; Round 5	Brian Molloy (0-10, 0-5 frees, 0-1 '65); David Tierney (1-3); Tom Tierney (0-5); Mikey Lynch (1-1); Gary Curly (0-2); Stephen Molloy, Stephen Roche, Jack Kenny, Dylan Towalwai (0-1)		Kevin Killilea (0-6, 0-1 free); Barry Hanley (0-7, 0-5 frees); Ben Murray (0-1)	Craughwell; Referee: Ronan Stankard

8 July 2016; 19:30; Round 5	Mullagh	1-14 - 0-16	Tynagh-Abbey/Duniry	Killimor; Referee: Christopher Browne
8 July 2016; 19:30; Round 5	Cathal Dervan (0-7, 0-2 frees); Finian Coone (1-1); Kevin Briscoe, Daniel Whyte (0-2); David Glennon, Justin Gaynor (0-1)		Shane Maloney (0-8, 0-3 frees); Padraig Breheny (0-3); Colm Larkin (0-2); Paul Killeen, John Breheny, Ronan Madden (0-1)	Killimor; Referee: Christopher Browne

===== Senior B - Playoffs =====
12 July 2016; 19:30; Senior B - Playoff	Kilnadeema-Leitrim	5-21 - 1-23 (a.e.t.)	Abbeyknockmoy	Ballinasloe; Referee: Christopher Browne
12 July 2016; 19:30; Senior B - Playoff	Brian Molloy (0-7, 0-4 frees, 0-1 '65); Shane Lawless (2-1); David Tierney (1-3); Tony Molloy (1-1, 1-0 free, 0-1 '65); Dylan Towolawi (1-1); Tom Tierney, Jack Kenny, Gary Curley (0-2); Damien Donoghue, Mikey Lynch (0-1)		Paul Flayerty (0-13, 0-10 frees, 0-1 '65); Brian Flaherty (1-1); Damien Rooney, Eoin Blade, Padraig O'Donnell, Greg Kennedy (0-2); Danny Mullins (0-1)	Ballinasloe; Referee: Christopher Browne

12 July 2016; 19:30; Senior B - Playoff	Beagh	0-20 - 0-19 (a.e.t.)	Tynagh-Abbey/Duniry	Athenry; Referee: John Keane
12 July 2016; 19:30; Senior B - Playoff	Rory Gantley (0-8, 0-7 frees); Joe Gantley (0-3); Eoin Mahon, Padraig Landers, John Moylan (0-2); Tommy McKeown, Jamie Diviney, Kevin Keehan (0-1)		Shane Maloney (0-14, 0-11 frees); Ronan Madden (0-2); Colm Larkin, Padraig Brehony, Niall Maloney (0-1)	Athenry; Referee: John Keane

=== Preliminary Quarter-finals ===
27 August 2016; 16:00; Preliminary Quarter-final	Mullagh	1-19 - 0-18	Cappataggle	Duggan Park, Ballinasloe; Referee: John Keane
27 August 2016; 16:00; Preliminary Quarter-final	Cathal Dervan (0-8, 0-6 frees, 0-1 '65); Donal Reilly (1-2); Niall Cahalane (0-3); Davy Glennon (0-2); Conor Dervan (0-2 frees); Pagraig Kennedy, Danny Whyte (0-1)		Daniel Nevin (0-7, 0-6 frees); Alan Dolan, Jarlath Mannion (0-3); James Egan, Darragh Dolan (0-2); Emmet Malone (0-1)	Duggan Park, Ballinasloe; Referee: John Keane

27 August 2016; 17:30; Preliminary Quarter-final	Tommy Larkin's	0-21 - 1-14	Pádraig Pearse's	Duggan Park, Ballinasloe; Referee: Christopher Browne
27 August 2016; 17:30; Preliminary Quarter-final	Jason Flynn (0-11, 0-7 frees); Conor Gardiner (0-4); Kevin McHugo (0-3); Ronan Murphy (0-2); Cathal Kelly (0-1)		Tomas Flannery (1-8, 1-7 frees); Emmet Ward (0-2); Adrian Bellew, Cyril Donnelan, Sean Hardiman, Cormac Ward (0-1)	Duggan Park, Ballinasloe; Referee: Christopher Browne

27 August 2016; 18:00; Preliminary Quarter-final	Sarsfields	4-21- 2-23	Kilnadeema-Leitrim	Kenny Park, Athenry; Referee: Leonard Fay
27 August 2016; 18:00; Preliminary Quarter-final	Niall Morrissey (1-11, 1-0 sideline, 0-7 frees); Joseph Cooney (2-3); Niall Quinn (1-2); Kevin Hynes (0-2); Cathal Murray, Kieran Kelly (0-1)		Brian Molloy (1-7, 0-4 frees); Shane Lawless (0-4); Tony Molloy (1-0); Jack Kenny (0-3); Stephen Molloy, David Tierney, Mikey Lynch (0-2); Darragh O'Donoghue, Dylan Twolawai, Liam Kelly (0-1)	Kenny Park, Athenry; Referee: Leonard Fay

28 August 2016; 12:00; Preliminary Quarter-final	St. Thomas'	0-19 - 0-17	Beagh	Kenny Park, Athenry; Referee: Shane Hynes
28 August 2016; 12:00; Preliminary Quarter-final	Darragh Burke (0-7, 0-4 frees, 0-1 '65); Gerald Murray (0-4 frees); David Sherry (0-3); Colin Fallon (0-2); Donal Cooney, Bernard Burke, David Burke (0-1)	Report	Rory Gantley (0-10, 0-9 frees, 0-1 '65); Jamie Diviney, Padraig Landers (0-2); Tommy McKeown, Joe Gantley, John Moylan (0-1)	Kenny Park, Athenry; Referee: Shane Hynes

=== Quarter-finals ===
17 September 2016; 16:30; Quarter-final	Craughwell	1-20 - 0-16	Tommy Larkin's	Kenny Park, Athenry; Referee: Alan Kelly
17 September 2016; 16:30; Quarter-final	Niall Healy (0-6, 0-3 frees, 0-1 '65); Jamie Ryan (1-2); Thomas Monaghan (0-3); Niall Callanan, Mark Horan, Shane Dolan (0-2); John Ryan, Shane Hynes, Kealan Cullinane (0-1)		Jason Flynn (0-7, 0-4 frees, 0-2 sidelines); Kevin McHugo (0-2, 0-1 sideline); Ronan Murphy (0-2); Shane Grady, Conor Nevin, Kevin Hooban, Conor Gardiner, Darragh Kelly (0-1)	Kenny Park, Athenry; Referee: Alan Kelly

17 September 2016; 18:00; Quarter-final	Loughrea	0-16 - 0-15	Mullagh	Duggan Park, Ballinasloe; Referee: Leonard Fay
17 September 2016; 18:00; Quarter-final	Gearoid Loughnane (0-8, 0-5 frees); Shane O'Brien (0-3); Paul Hoban, Joseph Mooney, Johnny Coen, Johnny Maher, Emmet Mahony (0-1)		Cathal Dervan (0-11 frees); David Glennon (0-2); Kevin Briscoe, Donal Reilly (0-1)	Duggan Park, Ballinasloe; Referee: Leonard Fay

17 September 2016; 18:00; Quarter-final	St. Thomas'	2-25 - 4-15	Portumna	Kenny Park, Athenry; Referee: John Keane
17 September 2016; 18:00; Quarter-final	Conor Cooney (0-11, 0-6 frees, 0-1 '65); Darragh Burke (1-2); Sean Skehill (1-1); David Burke, Brendan Farrell (0-3), Fintan Burke, James Regan, Bernard Burke, Kenneth Burke, Colin Fallon (0-1)		Ronan O'Meara (1-11, 0-6 frees, 1-0 penalty, 0-3 '65s); Damien Hayes (1-1); Kevin Hayes, Patrick Dolphin (1-0); Andy Smith, Ivan Canning, Colin Burke (0-1)	Kenny Park, Athenry; Referee: John Keane

18 September 2016; 18:00; Quarter-final	Gort	1-16 - 1-12	Sarsfields	Kenny Park, Athenry; Referee: Christopher Browne
18 September 2016; 18:00; Quarter-final	Aiden Helebert (0-6, 0-4 frees, 0-1 '65); Jason Grealish (0-5, 0-1 sideline); Michael Mullins (1-0), Wayne Walsh, Richard Cummins, Paul Killilea, Albert Mullins, Keith Killilea (0-1)		Niall Morrissey (0-3 frees); Kevin Cooney (1-0); Kerrill Wade (0-2, 0-1 frees); Joseph Cooney, Alan Ward (0-2); Ian Fox, Niall Quinn, Noel Kelly (0-1)	Kenny Park, Athenry; Referee: Christopher Browne

=== Semi-finals ===
2 October 2016; 14:00; Semi-final	Gort	1-17 - 0-18	Craughwell	Kenny Park, Athenry; Referee: Shane Hynes
2 October 2016; 14:00; Semi-final	Aiden Helebert (0-11, 0-6 frees); Gerard O'Donoghue (1-0); Albert Mullins (0-2), Richie Cummins; Gavin Lally (0-1 free); Jason Grealish (0-1)	Report	Niall Healy (0-13, 0-9 frees); Shane Dolan (0-2); Niall Callanan, Alan Callanan, Thomas Monaghan (0-1)	Kenny Park, Athenry; Referee: Shane Hynes

2 October 2016; 15:30; Semi-final	St Thomas'	1-15 - 1-10	Loughrea	Kenny Park, Athenry; Referee: Liam Gordon
2 October 2016; 15:30; Semi-final	Conor Cooney (0-8, 0-6 frees, 0-1 sideline); Brendan Farrell (1-0); Darragh Burke (0-3); Fintan Burke, Bernard Burke, David Sherry, Gerald Kelly (0-1)	Report	Neil Keary (1-8, 0-6 frees); Gearoid Loughnane, Kenneth Cormican (0-1)	Kenny Park, Athenry; Referee: Liam Gordon

=== Final ===
16 October 2016; 15:30; Final	St Thomas'	1-11 - 0-10	Gort	Pearse Stadium; Referee: Leonard Fay
16 October 2016; 15:30; Final	Conor Cooney (0-6 frees); Sean Skehill (1-0); Bernard Burke (0-2); Darragh Burke, James Regan, Brendan Farrell (0-1)	Report	Aiden Helebert (0-8, 0-6 frees); Paul Killilea (0-2)	Pearse Stadium; Referee: Leonard Fay

St. Thomas':
1	Patrick Skehill (c)
2	Fintan Burke
4	Cathal Burke
10	Eanna Burke
12	James Regan
5	Shane Cooney
7	Donal Cooney
13	Bernard Burke
8	David Burke
11	Conor Cooney
6	Darragh Burke
9	David Sherry
14	Brendan Farrell
3	Sean Skehill
15	Kenneth Burke
Substitutes Used:
19	Gerald Kelly for Darragh Burke (52)
6	Darragh Burke for David Sherry (54)
17	Anthony Kelly for Sean Skehill (57)
22	Colin Fallon for Kenneth Burke (64)
Manager:
John Burke

Gort:
1	Gavin Lally
2	Tadhg Linnane
3	Mark McMahon
4	Michael Cummins
5	Pakie Lally
22	Greg Lally
6	Aidan Harte
7	Sylvie Óg Linanne (c)
9	Jack Grealish
10	Paul Killilea
11	Albert Mullins
12	Aiden Helebert
13	Richie Cummins
14	Michael Mullins
8	Jason Grealish
Substitutes Used:
24	Gerard O’Donoghue for Paul Killilea (33-35)
24	Gerard O’Donoghue for M Mullins (35)
15	Wayne Walsh for Greg Lally (48)
Manager:
Michael Finn

=== Relegation ===
15 July 2016; 19:30; Relegation	Carnmore	3-9 - 0-12	Kiltormer	Athenry; Referee: Alan Kelly
