= Mattie Murphy =

Irish hurler and manager

Personal information
- Native name: Maitiú Ó Murchú (Irish)
- Born: Turloughmore, County Galway, Ireland

Sport
- Sport: Hurling
Club management
- Years: Club
- Gort
	2	0	0
Inter-county management
- Years: Team
- 1994–1996 1998–2000 2001–2002: Galway; Galway; Mayo
Inter-county titles as manager
County	League	Province	All-Ireland
Galway	0	3	3

Matthew "Mattie" Murphy is an Irish former hurling manager and former player. Though he was manager of the Galway senior hurling team on two occasions, was as manager of the Galway minor team that he experienced his greatest success in terms of major titles won.

Born in Turloughmore, County Galway, Murphy was introduced to hurling in his youth. After coming to prominence at underage levels with the Turloughmore club, he later transferred to Gort. A two-time Connacht medal winner with the Gort senior team, Murphy also won two county senior championship medals.

Murphy has been involved at coaching at all levels at club and inter-county for four decades. Between 1992 and 2013 he became the most successful manager in the history of the All-Ireland Minor Championship after guiding Galway to six All-Ireland titles. As manager of the Galway senior team on two separate occasions he won three Connacht titles and two National Hurling League medals.

== Honours ==
=== Player ===
Gort

- Connacht Senior Club Hurling Championship (2): 1982, 1984
- Galway Senior Club Hurling Championship (2): 1981, 1983

=== Manager ===
Gort

- Galway Senior Hurling Championship (1): 2011, 2014

Galway

- Connacht Senior Hurling Championship (3): 1995, 1996, 1999
- National Hurling League (2): 1995-96, 2000
- All-Ireland Minor Hurling Championship (6): 1992, 1994, 2004, 2005, 2009, 2011

Sporting positions
Preceded by Jarlath Cloonan	Galway Senior Hurling Manager; 1994–1996	Succeeded by Cyril Farrell
Preceded by Cyril Farrell	Galway Senior Hurling Manager; 1998–2000	Succeeded by Noel Lane
Preceded by Gerry Kilbride	Mayo Senior Hurling Manager; 2001–2002	Succeeded by Gerry Spellman
