= Frank Burke (hurler) =

Irish hurler (born 1952)

Personal information
- Native name: Prionsias de Búrca (Irish)
- Born: 1952 (age 73–74) Turloughmore, County Galway, Ireland
- Occupation: Retired schoolteacher
- Height: 6 ft 1 in (185 cm)

Sport
- Sport: Hurling
- Position: Centre-forward
Club
- Years: Club
- Turloughmore
Club titles
- Galway titles: 1
- Connacht titles: 1
Inter-county*
Years	County	Apps (scores)
1973-1983	Galway	19 (6-12)
Inter-county titles
- All-Irelands: 1
- NHL: 1
- All Stars: 2
- *Inter County team apps and scores correct as of 17:30, 9 February 2014.

Frank Burke (born 1952) is an Irish retired hurler who played as a centre-forward for the Galway senior team.

Born in Turloughmore, County Galway, Burke first played competitive hurling at school at Presentation College, Athenry. He made his first impression on the inter-county scene when he joined the Galway under-21 team. He made his senior debut during the 1973 championship. Burke went on to play a key role for Galway for a decade, and won one All-Ireland medal and one National Hurling League medal. He was an All-Ireland runner-up on four occasions.

As a member of the Connacht inter-provincial team at various times throughout his career, Burke won one Railway Cup medal. At club level he is a one-time Connacht medallist with Turloughmore. He also won one championship medal.

Throughout his career Burke made 19 championship appearances. His retirement came following the conclusion of the 1983 championship.

== Playing career ==
=== Club ===
Burke was entering the twilight of his career when he enjoyed his biggest successes with the Turloughmore club.

In 1985 Burke was captain of the club's senior team that reached the county decider. A 1-14 to 1-4 trouncing of Killimordaly gave him a Galway Senior Hurling Championship medal and the honour of lifting the cup. Burke later added a Connacht medal to his collection following a narrow 1-8 to 2-4 defeat of Ballygar.

=== Inter-county ===
As a member of the Galway under-21 hurling team in 1972, Burke tasted his first success at inter-county level. Galway reached the All-Ireland decider that year with Dublin providing the opposition. A narrow 2-9 to 1-10 victory gave him an All-Ireland Under-21 Hurling Championship medal.

Burke made his senior championship debut on 29 July 1973 in a shock 3-5 to 4-7 defeat by London in the All-Ireland quarter-final.

In 1975 Galway made a long-awaited breakthrough. A 4-9 to 4-6 defeat of Tipperary gave Burke a National Hurling League medal. Galway later qualified for an All-Ireland final meeting with reigning champions Kilkenny, their first appearance in the championship decider in seventeen years and the very first seventy-minute final. Playing with the wind in the first half, Galway found themselves 0-9 to 1-3 down at the interval having played poorly. Early in the second half Kilkenny scored an early 1-3 to put this game to bed, and although Galway did reply with 1-1 and were only four points behind with twenty-five minutes left on the clock, there was never any doubt in this match. Galway were eventually defeated by 2-22 to 2-10.

Galway faced All-Ireland semi-final defeat over the next three years, however, Burke was personally honoured in 1976 when he collected his first All-Star award.

Galway shocked four-in-a-row hopefuls Cork in the 1979 All-Ireland semi-final and qualified for an All-Ireland final showdown with Kilkenny. In one of the worst All-Ireland finals of the decade, Galway goalkeeper Séamus Shinnors had an absolute nightmare of a game. A 70-yards free by Liam "Chunky" O'Brien after just four minutes dipped, hit off Shinnors and ended up in the Galway net. Galway fought back and went two points up twelve minutes into the second half, however, they failed to score for the rest of the game. Four minutes before the end of the game another long-range free for Kilkenny ended up in the net behind Shinnors. It was a score which summed up the day for Burke's side as Kilkenny went on to win by 2-12 to 1-8. In spite of this defeat he later collected a second All-Star.

In 1980 Galway defeated Kildare and Offaly to reach a second consecutive All-Ireland final. Munster champions Limerick provided the opposition on this occasion and an exciting championship decider followed. Goals by Bernie Forde and Molloy meant that the men from the west led by 2-7 to 1-5 at half-time. Éamonn Cregan single-handedly launched the Limerick counter-attack in the second-half. Over the course of the game he scored 2-7, including an overhead goal and a point in which he showed the ball to Hayes and nonchalantly drove the ball over the bar. It was not enough to stem the tide and Galway went on to win the game by 2-15 to 3-9. It was Galway's first All-Ireland title since 1923, with Burke picking up a winners' medal and the celebrations surpassed anything ever seen in Croke Park.

1981 saw Galway reach a third consecutive All-Ireland final and Offaly were the opponents. Everything seemed to be going well for Burke's side as Galway hoped to capture a second consecutive All-Ireland title. Offaly 'keeper Damien Martin was doing great work in batting out an almost certain Galway goal early in the second-half. With twenty-three minutes left in the game Galway led by six points, however, they failed to score for the rest of the game. Johnny Flaherty hand-passed Offaly's second goal with just three minutes remaining. At the long whistle Galway were defeated by 2-12 to 0-15.

Burke played his last championship game for Galway on 7 August 1983 in a 5-14 to 1-16 All-Ireland semi-final defeat by Cork.

=== Inter-provincial ===
Burke also lined out with Connacht in the inter-provincial series of games and enjoyed some success.

== Honours ==
=== Turloughmore ===
1991 Junior A champions

Turloughmore

- Connacht Senior Club Hurling Championship (1): 1985 (c)
- Galway Senior Club Hurling Championship (1): 1985 (c)

Galway

- All-Ireland Senior Hurling Championship (1): 1980
- National Hurling League (1): 1974-75
- All-Ireland Under-21 Hurling Championship (1): 1972

Connacht

- Railway Cup (1): 1983

=== Individual ===
Awards

- All-Star Award (2): 1976, 1979
