= Paul Dullaghan =

Irish hurler

Personal information
- Born: 1983 (age 42–43) Turloughmore, County Galway, Ireland
- Occupation: Bank official

Sport
- Sport: Hurling
- Position: Goalkeeper
Club
- Years: Club
- Turloughmore
Club titles
- Galway titles: 0
College
- Years: College
- 2001–2005: NUI Galway
College titles
- Fitzgibbon titles: 0
Inter-county
Years	County	Apps (scores)
2004–2006	Galway	0 (0–0)
Inter-county titles
- All-Irelands: 0
- NHL: 1
- All Stars: 0

Paul Dullaghan (born 1983) is an Irish hurling selector, administrator and former player. At club level, he played with Turloughmore and also lined out at inter-county level with various Galway teams.

== Playing career ==
Dullaghan first played hurling at juvenile and underage levels with the Turloughmore club. He eventually progressed to adult level; however, his career yielded little in terms of success. Dullaghan also lined out NUI Galway in the Fitzgibbon Cup.

Dullaghan's inter-county career with Galway began at minor level. He lined out as goalkeeper when Galway were beaten by Cork in the 2001 All-Ireland MHC final. Dullaghan later progressed to the under-21 team. Dullaghan was called up to the senior team during their National Hurling League-winning campaign in 2004. He was sub-goalkeeper when Galway lost to Cork in the 2005 All-Ireland SHC final; however, he was released from the panel the following year.

== Post-playing career ==
Dullaghan has also been involved as a Gaelic games administrator, serving as PRO of the Turloughmore club.

== Honours ==
Galway

- National Hurling League: 2004
