= Grealish =

Grealish is a surname of Irish origin. Notable people with the surname include:

- Jack Grealish (born 1995), English footballer
- Jack Grealish (hurler) (born 1997), Irish hurler
- Noel Grealish (born 1965), Irish politician
- Tony Grealish (1956–2013), English-born Irish footballer
