= 2014 Galway Senior Hurling Championship =

Annual hurling competition season

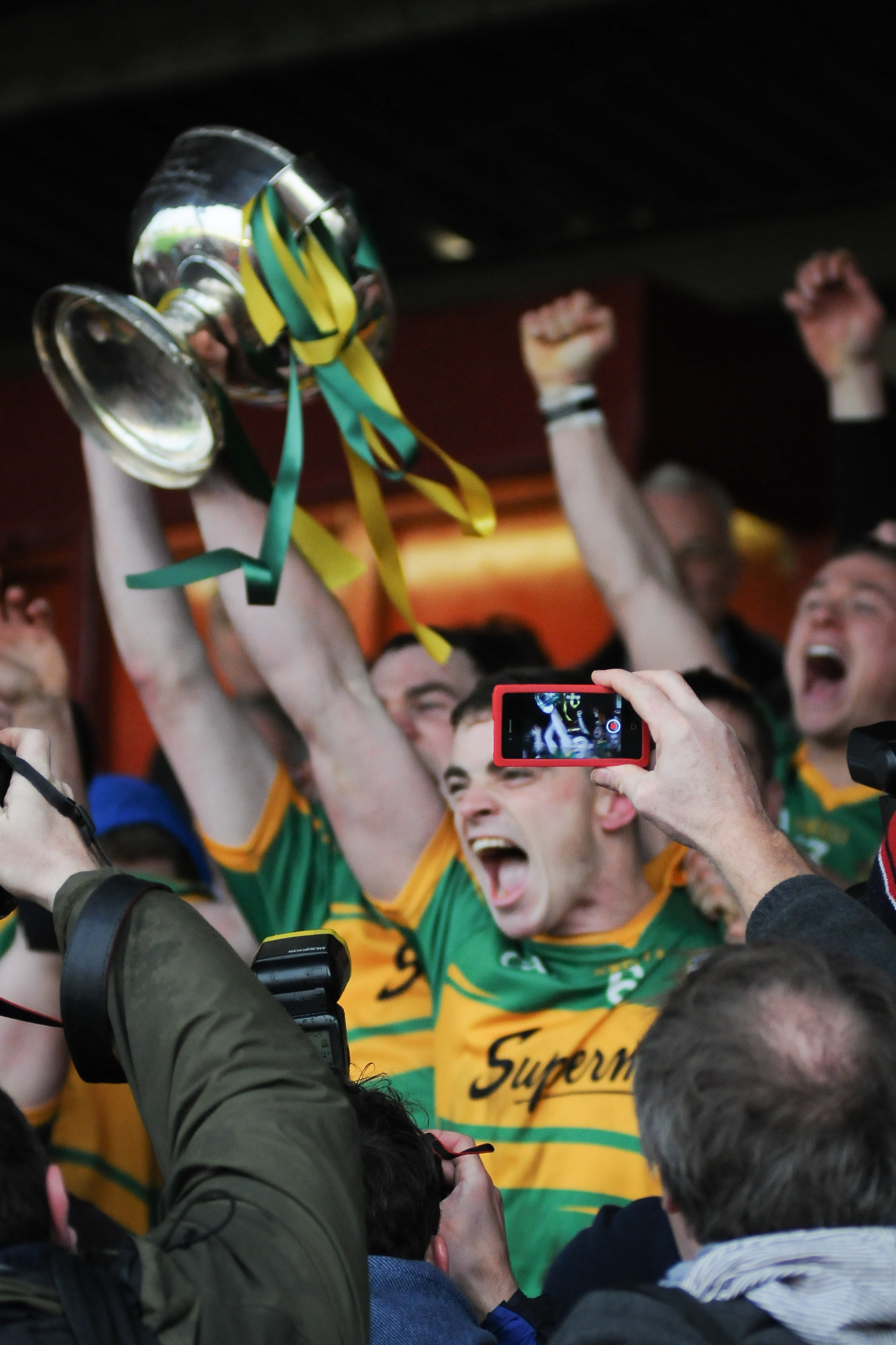

Tournament details
- County: Galway
- Year: 2014

Winners
- Champions: Gort
- Manager: Michael Finn; Gerry Spellman; Matt Murphy; Shane Counihan
- Captain: Greg Lally

Promotion/Relegation
- Relegated team(s): Kinvara

The 2014 Galway Senior Hurling Championship was the 117th staging of the Galway Senior Hurling Championship since its establishment in 1887.

The Preliminary Round and First Round draws were made on 11 March 2014 at the Salthill Hotel. Gort won the final on 14 December 2014.

== Format ==
22 teams contested the 2014 championship. The competition consisted of 2 full rounds of games (and two preliminary rounds), followed by a group stage and then quarter-finals, semi-finals and a final - as well as qualifier group to help decide which team will be relegated and a Shield Competition.

== Matthew Keating Controversy ==
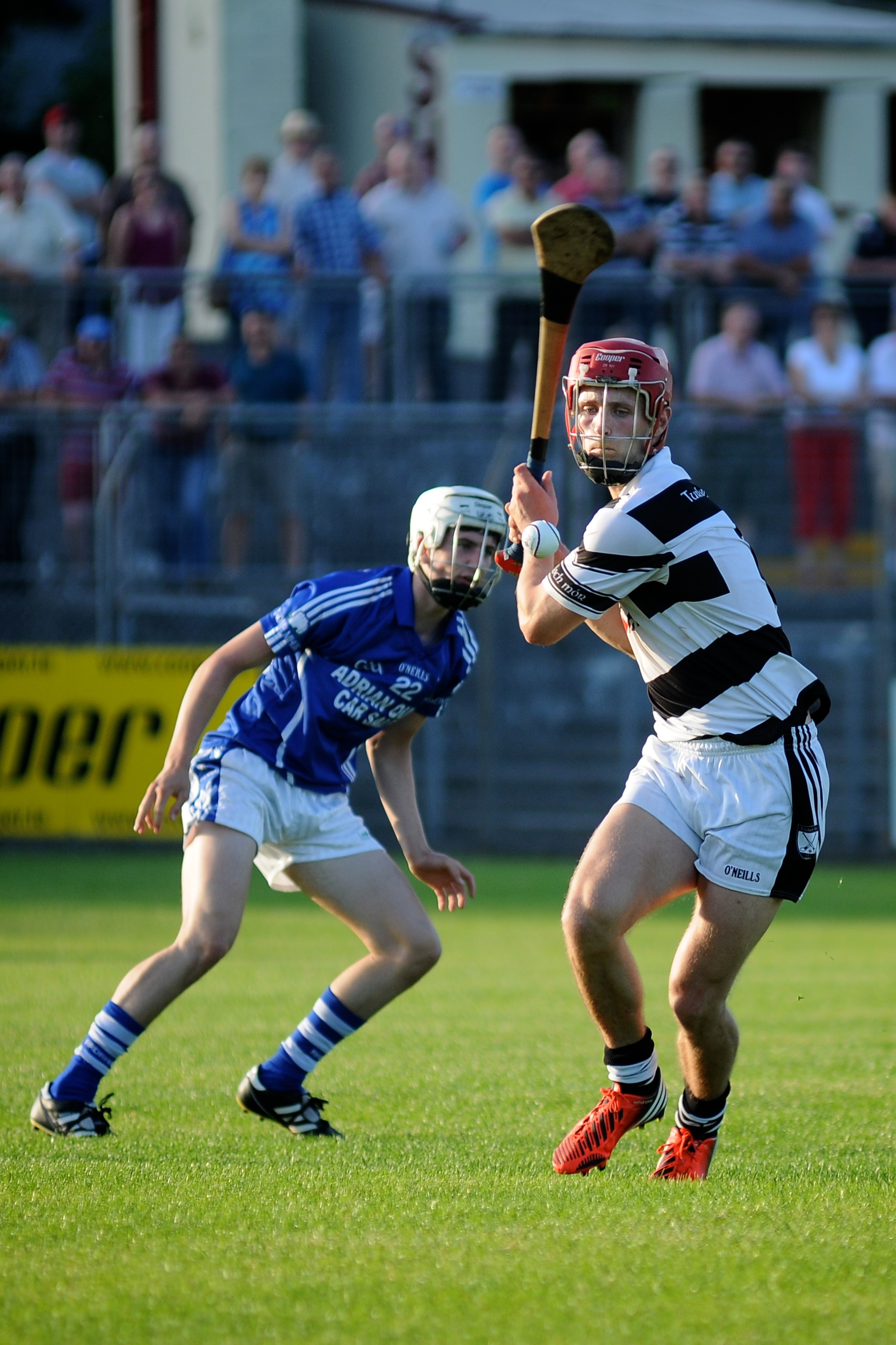
Matthew Keating of Turloughmore in action against Ardrahan in the 2013 Galway Senior Hurling Championship at Kenny Park, Athenry

At a Galway Competitions Control Committee meeting on 2 October 2014 it was ruled that Turloughmore would forfeit their Group C game against Beagh which was played on 14 September 2014 due to the fielding of an ineligible player. Turloughmore's Matthew Keating had been granted an inter-county transfer to Long Island Gaels in New York deeming him ineligible to play in the Galway Senior Hurling Championship as it is not permitted for a player to play in two different championships in a single year.

The group game was forfeited without award of the 2 points to Beagh. Nevertheless, Beagh moved to second in the group and were therefore eligible to play Ardrahan in the quarter finals. All this despite the fact that Turloughmore and Ardrahan had already contested the quarter final on 27 September 2014 - a game which has now also been declared null and void.

Turloughmore appealed the decision to the Connacht Council on 8 October 2014 who upheld the decision. A further appeal was lodged with the Disputes Resolution Authority (DRA).

On 11 October 2014 the Galway County Board released a statement stating that they will establish a new investigation committee to reprocess the request from Beagh to investigate the composition of the Turloughmore team that played in the Galway Senior Hurling Championship Game on 14 September 2014. Consequently, the quarter-final between Ardrahan and Beagh scheduled for 12 October 2014 was postponed. The new investigation on 22 October 2014 confirmed the initial ruling - that Turloughmore be eliminated from the championship.

Turloughmore's final appeal against their expulsion from the competition failed on 17 November with an official statement released saying "At a hearing before the Disputes Resolution Authority Tribunal, held in Mullingar on Monday evening, 17 November 2014, the appeal of CLG Turloughmore against the decision of the Galway Competitions Control Committee was unsuccessful.”This allows the Galway Senior Hurling Championship to recommence immediately."

== Fixtures and results ==
=== Preliminary to Round 1 ===
A single game open draw from the 20 teams excluding the senior and intermediate champions of 2013 - Portumna and Kilnadeema-Leitrim.

26 April 2014; 17:00; Preliminary to Round 1	Beagh	2-18 - 1-14	Craughwell	Loughrea; Referee: Phelim Shaughnessy
26 April 2014; 17:00; Preliminary to Round 1	Kevin Keehan (0-9, 0-8 frees), Joe Gantley (1-4), Kieran Diviney (1-1), Kevin O'Grady, Brian McGuane, Adrian Tuohy, Pádraig Landers (0-1)		Niall Healy (0-8, 0-5 frees), Alan Callanan (0-3), Jamie Ryan (1-0), Shane Dolan (0-2), Cian Larkin (0-1)	Loughrea; Referee: Phelim Shaughnessy

=== Round 1 ===
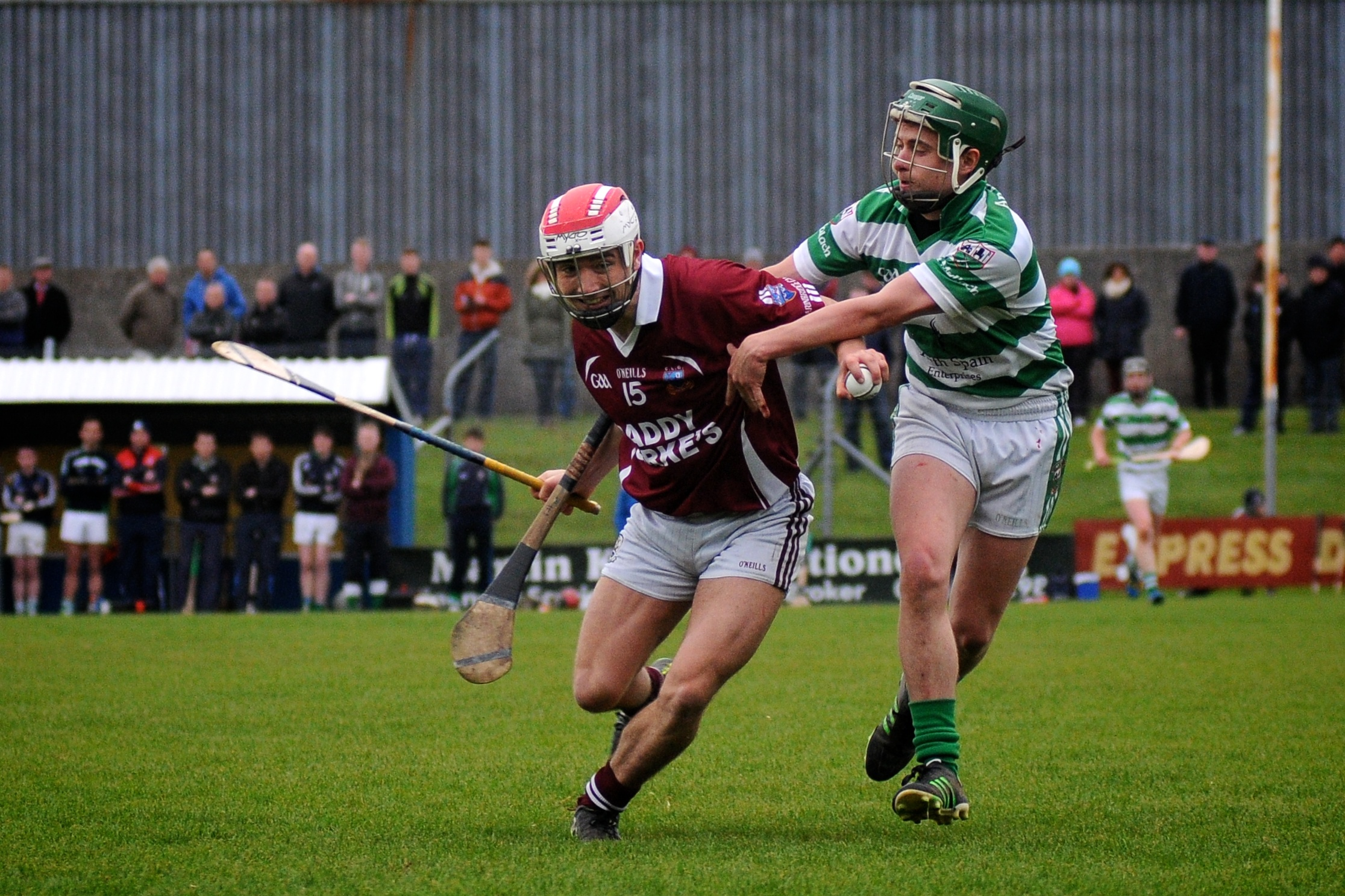
Billy Lane of Clarinbridge and David Headd of Mullagh in action in the opening game of the 2014 Galway Senior Hurling Championship

20 Teams: the winner of the Preliminary to Round 1 game plus 19 other teams - all teams excluding the loser of Preliminary to Round 1 game and the 2013 Intermediate Champions Kilnadeema-Leitrim. The 10 games of this round were to be decided by open draw - the winners progressed to the group phase, the losers to Round 2.

25 April 2014; 19:00; Round 1	Mullagh	1-18 - 0-19	Clarinbridge	Loughrea; Referee: Michael Haverty
25 April 2014; 19:00; Round 1	Cathal Dervan (0-7 frees); David Glennon (1-3); Finian Coone (0-3); Conor Dervan, Kevin Briscoe, Niall Cahalane, Francis Hardiman, Tony Clarke (0-1)		Paul Coen (0-10, 0-7 frees); Eoin Forde (0-4); Alan Armstrong, Billy Lane, Stephen Forde, Éanna Murphy, David Forde (0-1)	Loughrea; Referee: Michael Haverty

26 April 2014; 17:00; Round 1	Carnmore	1-10 - 0-13	Sarsfields	Kenny Park; Referee: Eoin Shaughnessy
26 April 2014; 17:00; Round 1	Kevin Killilea (0-5, 0-4 frees); George Hanley (1-2); JP O'Connell, Barry Hanley, Paul Fox (0-1)		Kerrill Wade (0-7, 0-5 frees); Niall Morrissey (0-2); Kevin Hynes, Liam M Kelly, Cyril Murray, Alan Ward (0-1)	Kenny Park; Referee: Eoin Shaughnessy

26 April 2014; 18:30; Round 1	Athenry	2-20 - 0-15	Liam Mellows	Gort; Referee: Gerry Donoghue
26 April 2014; 18:30; Round 1	Cathal Keane (0-8, 0-6 frees); Jack Carr (2-1); Tom Flynn (0-3); David Donoghue, Adrian Healy, Aidan Higgins (0-2); Conor Burke, Paddy Hannon (0-1)		Tadhg Haran (0-10, 0-7 frees, 0-1 sideline); Aonghus Callanan (0-2); Kevin Lee, Adrian Morrissey, Conor Hynes (0-1)	Gort; Referee: Gerry Donoghue

26 April 2014; 18:30; Round 1	Tynagh-Abbey/Duniry	2-15 - 0-15	Turloughmore	Loughrea; Referee: Gerry O'Connor
26 April 2014; 18:30; Round 1	Shane Moloney (0-7, 0-3 frees); Niall Moloney (1-2); Pádraig Robinson (1-1); Pádraig Breheny (0-3), Kevin Moloney, Paul Gordon (0-1)		Conor Shaughnessy (0-7 frees); Gary Burke (0-3); Barry McDonagh, Ronan Badger (0-2); Brian Murphy (0-1)	Loughrea; Referee: Gerry O'Connor

26 April 2014; 18:30; Round 1	Ardrahan	2-10 - 0-9	Pádraig Pearse's	Kenny Park; Referee: Leonard Fay
26 April 2014; 18:30; Round 1	Jason Kennedy (2-2); Maurice Callanan (0-4 frees); Jonathan Glynn (0-2); Cormac Diviney, Stephen Whelan (0-1)		Emmet Ward (0-5 frees); Fearghal Flannery, Jimmy Gelston, Ronan Bellew, Tomás Flannery (0-1)	Kenny Park; Referee: Leonard Fay

27 April 2014; 14:00; Round 1	Killimordaly	1-15 - 0-14	Kiltormer	Ballinasloe; Referee: Kevin Egan
27 April 2014; 14:00; Round 1	Brian Burke (0-9, 0-4 frees); Éanna Ryan (1-0); Conor Daly (0-2); Keith Kennedy, Shane Concannon, David Concannon, Brian Concannon (0-1)		David Hayes (0-6); Conor Ryan (0-4 frees); Brendan Kenny (0-3); Michael Dolan (0-1)	Ballinasloe; Referee: Kevin Egan

27 April 2014; 15:30; Round 1	Tommy Larkin's	2-15 - 0-19	St. Thomas's	Ballinasloe; Referee: Christopher Browne
27 April 2014; 15:30; Round 1	Jason Flynn (0-11, 0-8 frees, 0-1 sideline); Eamon Hayes, Stephen Page (1-0); Gerard Kelly (0-2); Kevin Hooban, Kevin McHugo (0-1)		Conor Cooney (0-11 frees); Éanna Burke, David Burke (0-3); Enda Tannion, Gerald Murray (0-1)	Ballinasloe; Referee: Christopher Browne

27 April 2014; 17:00; Round 1	Loughrea	1-15 - 0-12	Gort	Kenny Park; Referee: John Keane
27 April 2014; 17:00; Round 1	Neil Keary (0-8 frees); Johnny Coen (0-5); Johnny Maher (1-1); Jamie Ryan (0-1)		Michael Mullins (0-7, 0-6 frees); Aidan Harte (0-2, 0-1 sideline); Paul Killilea, Richard Cummins, Albert Mullins (0-1)	Kenny Park; Referee: John Keane

27 April 2014; 18:30; Round 1	Portumna	1-29 - 1-19	Castlegar	Kenny Park; Referee: Alan Kelly
27 April 2014; 18:30; Round 1	Joe Canning (0-12, 0-9 frees); Ronan O'Meara (1-4); Damien Hayes (0-5); Kevin Hayes (0-3); Oisin Royston (0-2); Andrew Smith, Ollie Canning, Niall Hayes (0-1)		Ger Farragher (0-11 frees); Enda Concannon (1-1); Kevin Brady (0-3); Dean Higgins, Jason O'Gorman, Martin Cullinane, Michael Fahy (0-1)	Kenny Park; Referee: Alan Kelly

3 May 2014; 17:00; Round 1 Replay	Sarsfields	1-14 - 1-12	Carnmore	Kenny Park; Referee: Gerry Donoghue
3 May 2014; 17:00; Round 1 Replay	Kerrill Wade (1-6, 0-6 frees); Liam M Kelly, Noel Kelly (0-2); Joseph Cooney, Niall Quinn, Éanna Dolan, Niall Morrissey (0-1)		Kevin Killilea (1-7, 0-7 frees); Barry Hanley (0-2); Eoin Grealish, JP O'Connell, George Hanley (0-1)	Kenny Park; Referee: Gerry Donoghue

3 May 2014; 18:30; Round 1	Beagh	1-18 - 1-13	Kinvara	Kenny Park; Referee: Christopher Browne
3 May 2014; 18:30; Round 1	Padraig Landers (0-7); Kevin Keehan (1-2, 0-2 frees); Rory Gantley (0-3, 0-1 frees); Adrian Tuohy (0-3); Adrian Diviney, Jamie Diviney, Joe Gantley (0-1)		Conor Kavanagh (0-7, 0-4 frees); Colm Callanan (1-0 free); Stevie Moylan, Ronan Kilkelly, Tom Donovan, Conor Whelan, Cathal Connolly, Ger Mahon (0-1)	Kenny Park; Referee: Christopher Browne

=== Preliminary to Round 2 ===
Another single game open draw - this time from the losers of the Round 1 games. The teams that took part in the Preliminary to Round 1 game were exempt from this game. The loser of this game progressed to the qualifier/relegation group phase.

10 May 2014; 18:30; Preliminary to Round 2	St. Thomas's	0-17 - 0-11	Castlegar	Kenny Park; Referee: Gerry O'Connor
10 May 2014; 18:30; Preliminary to Round 2	Conor Cooney (0-4 frees); Éanna Burke (0-4); Gerald Murray, Kenneth Burke (0-2); Enda Tannian, David Burke, Shane Cooney, James Regan, Ritchie Murray (0-1)		Ger Farragher (0-6, 0-5 frees); Thomas Mannion, Ronan O'Flynn, Enda Concannon, David O'Gorman, Martin Cullinane (0-1)	Kenny Park; Referee: Gerry O'Connor

=== Round 2 ===
10 Teams: the losing team from the Preliminary to Round 1 game, losing teams from Round 1 plus the winner of the Preliminary to Round 2 game. The winners of the 5 games progressed to the group phase, the losers to the qualifier/relegation group phase.

10 May 2014; 17:00; Round 2	Gort	4-13 - 4-11	Liam Mellows	Kenny Park; Referee: Christopher Brown
10 May 2014; 17:00; Round 2	Michael Mullins (1-8); Ger O'Donoghue (2-2); Albert Mullins (1-0); Paul Killilea (0-2); Richard Cummins (0-1)		Aonghus Callanan (2-3); Tadhg Haran (0-7 frees); Adrian Morrissey (1-1); Jack Hastings (1-0)	Kenny Park; Referee: Christopher Brown

11 May 2014; 14:00; Round 2	Clarinbridge	0-13 - 1-9	Kiltormer	Kenny Park; Referee: Eoin Shaughnessy
11 May 2014; 14:00; Round 2	Paul Coen (0-5, 0-3 frees); Éanna Murphy (0-3); Shane Burke (0-2); Eoin Forde (0-2 frees); Alan Armstrong (0-1)		Conor Ryan (0-6, 0-2 frees); Derek Dervan (1-2, 0-2 frees); David Hayes (0-1)	Kenny Park; Referee: Eoin Shaughnessy

11 May 2014; 15:30; Round 2	Turloughmore	1-12 - 2-8	Kinvara	Kenny Park; Referee: Alan Kelly
11 May 2014; 15:30; Round 2	Conor Shaughnessy (1-2, 0-1 frees); Darren Shaughnessy (0-4, 0-2 frees); Jamie Holland (0-2); Dathaí Burke, Shane Burke, Denis Forde, Brian Murphy (0-1)		Conor Whelan (1-3, 0-1 free); Colm Callanan (1-0); Shane Kavanagh (0-2 frees); Tom Donovan (0-2); Ronan Kilkelly (0-1)	Kenny Park; Referee: Alan Kelly

11 May 2014; 17:00; Round 2	Carnmore	0-16 - 2-9	Pádraig Pearse's	Kenny Park; Referee: John Keane
11 May 2014; 17:00; Round 2	Kevin Killilea (0-9 frees); Aidan Reilly (0-2); Eoin Grealish, Ciaran Murray, George Hanley, Oisin Keane (0-1); Barry Hanley (0-1 free)		Tomás Flannery (2-1); Emmett Ward (0-6, 0-5 frees); Fearghal Flannery (0-1 free); Cormac Ward (0-1)	Kenny Park; Referee: John Keane

17 May 2014; 17:00; Round 2	Craughwell	0-22 - 1-17	St. Thomas's	Kenny Park; Referee: Christopher Brown
17 May 2014; 17:00; Round 2	Niall Healy (0-13, 0-9 frees); Niall Callanan, Michael Coughlan, Cian Larkin, Jamie Ryan (0-2); Alan Callanan (0-1)		Conor Cooney (1-11, 1-7 frees); David Burke (0-3); Éanna Burke (0-2, 0-1 sideline); Ritchie Murray (0-1)	Kenny Park; Referee: Christopher Brown

=== Group Phase (Rounds 3, 4 & 5) ===
16 Teams: the 10 winners from Round 1, the 5 winners from Round 2 and the 2013 Intermediate Champions Kilnadeema-Leitrim.

An open draw made in the Maldron Hotel, broadcast live on Galway Bay FM on 13 May 2014 decided 4 groups containing 4 teams each. The top two teams in each group qualified for the quarter-finals. The third and fourth placed teams played in the Shield Competition.

==== Group A ====
Pos	Team	Pld	W	D	L	SF	SA	Diff	Pts
1	Loughrea	3	2	1	0	0-58	2-39	13	5
2	Killimordaly	3	2	1	0	2-57	1-55	5	5
3	Sarsfields	3	1	0	2	1-49	2-49	-3	2
4	Mullagh	3	0	0	3	3-42	1-63	-15	0

24 May 2014; 17:30; Group A	Loughrea	0-15 - 0-13	Sarsfields	Kenny Park; Referee: Sean Moran
24 May 2014; 17:30; Group A	Neil Keary (0-4, 0-2 frees); Johnny Maher (0-3 frees); Emmet Mahony, Jamie Ryan (0-3); Johnny Coen (0-1)		Kerill Wade (0-6 frees); Kevin Hynes (0-3); Cyril Murray, Joseph Cooney, Niall Morrissey, Noel Kelly (0-1)	Kenny Park; Referee: Sean Moran

24 May 2014; 19:00; Group A	Killimordaly	1-19 - 0-20	Mullagh	Ballinasloe; Referee: Peter Murphy
24 May 2014; 19:00; Group A	Brian Burke (0-9, 0-6 frees); Brian Concannon (1-2); Éanna Ryan (0-3), Tomas Madden (0-2); Shane Concannon, Conor Daly, Jonathon Creavan (0-1)		Cathal Dervan (0-10, 0-5 frees); David Glennon (0-3), Finian Coone, Kevin Briscoe (0-2); Conor Dervan (0-2, 0-1 free); Francis Hardiman (0-1)	Ballinasloe; Referee: Peter Murphy

12 July 2014; 19:00; Group A	Sarsfields	0-20 - 2-12	Mullagh	Kenny Park; Referee: Sean Moran
12 July 2014; 19:00; Group A	Kerril Wade (0-8, 0-7 frees); Joseph Cooney (0-3, 0-2 frees); Noel Kelly (0-3); Niall Morrissey, Liam M. Kelly (0-2); Kevin Hynes, Eanna Dolan (0-1)		Cathal Dervan (1-7, 0-5 frees); David Glennon (0-4); Justin Gaynor (1-0); Finian Coone (0-1)	Kenny Park; Referee: Sean Moran

13 July 2014; 17:30; Group A	Loughrea	0-19 - 1-16	Killimordaly	Kenny Park; Referee: Seamus Moran
13 July 2014; 17:30; Group A	Johnny Maher (0-5, 0-2 frees); Niall Keary (0-4, 0-3 frees); Kenneth Colleran (0-3); Emmet Mahony (0-2); Johnny Coen, Gavin Keary, Joseph Mooney, Jamie Ryan, Gearóid Loughnane (0-1)		Brian Burke (0-12, 0-10 frees); Paul Madden (1-1); Keith Kennedy (0-1 free); Andrew Daly, Éanna Ryan (0-1)	Kenny Park; Referee: Seamus Moran

13 September 2014; 16:30; Group A	Killimordaly	0-22 - 1-16	Sarsfields	Kenny Park; Referee: Phelim Shaughnessy
13 September 2014; 16:30; Group A	Brian Burke (0-10, 0-9 frees); Thomas Madden, Brian Concannon (0-3); David Concannon (0-2); Eanna Ryan, Darragh Cooney, Andrew Daly (0-1); Nigel Daly (0-1 free)		Niall Morrissey (0-9, 0-8 frees); Kerril Wade (1-1); Kieran Kelly, Eamon Cleary, Liam M Kelly, Éanna Dolan, Noel Kelly, Alan Ward (0-1)	Kenny Park; Referee: Phelim Shaughnessy

13 September 2014; 16:30; Group A	Loughrea	0-24 - 1-10	Mullagh	Ballinasloe; Referee: Michael Dolan
13 September 2014; 16:30; Group A	Johnny Maher (0-11, 0-8 frees); Joseph Mooney, Johnny Coen, Jamie Ryan (0-3); Neil Keary, Emmet Mahony, Gearóid Loughnane, Paul Hoban (0-1)		Cathal Dervan (1-7, 1-6 frees); Finian Coone (0-2); Seán Hardiman (0-1)	Ballinasloe; Referee: Michael Dolan

==== Group B ====
Pos	Team	Pld	W	D	L	SF	SA	Diff	Pts
1	Gort	3	3	0	0	8-49	4-30	31	6
2	Tommy Larkin's	3	2	0	1	2-51	4-46	-1	4
3	Clarinbridge	3	1	0	2	2-44	4-45	-7	2
4	Kilnadeema-Leitrim	3	0	0	3	1-33	1-56	-23	0

24 May 2014; 17:30; Group B	Clarinbridge	1-15 - 0-13	Kilnadeema-Leitrim	Loughrea; Referee: Eoin Shaughnessy
24 May 2014; 17:30; Group B	Paul Coen (0-7, 0-6 frees); Barry Keane (1-1); Shane Burke (0-4); Billy Lane, Eoin Forde, Éanna Murphy (0-1)		Brian Molloy (0-7, 0-4 frees); Liam Kelly (0-4); Liam Geraghty (0-2);	Loughrea; Referee: Eoin Shaughnessy

25 May 2014; 17:30; Group B	Gort	4-14 - 2-13	Tommy Larkin's	Kenny Park; Referee: Leonard Fay
25 May 2014; 17:30; Group B	Michael Mullins (1-3, 0-3 frees); Richard Cummins (1-2); Albert Mullins (1-1); Wayne Walsh (0-4); Paul Killilea (1-0); Ger O'Donoghue (0-2); Sylvie Óg Linnane, Martin Nestor (0-1)		Jason Flynn (1-7, 1-6 frees); Niall Kelly (1-0); Kevin Hooban, Gerard Kelly (0-2); Kevin McHugo, Eamon Hayes (0-1)	Kenny Park; Referee: Leonard Fay

12 July 2014; 17:30; Group B	Tommy Larkin's	0-16 - 0-12	Kilnadeema-Leitrim	Loughrea; Referee: Michael Dolan
12 July 2014; 17:30; Group B	Jason Flynn (0-9, 0-7 frees); Kevin Hooban (0-3); Eamonn Hayes (0-2), Kevin McHugo, Gerard Kelly (0-1)		Brian Molloy (0-6 frees); Damien Donoghue (0-3); Sean Burke, Liam Geraghty, Tom Tierney (0-1)	Loughrea; Referee: Michael Dolan

13 July 2014; 19:00; Group B	Gort	4-10 - 1-9	Clarinbridge	Kenny Park; Referee: John Keane
13 July 2014; 19:00; Group B	Richie Cummins (2-4); Jack Grealish (2-1); Wayne Walsh, Albert Mullins, Martin Nestor, Michael Mullins, Kaelen Higgins (0-1)		Paul Coen (0-4, 0-3 frees); Barry Keane (1-1); Eoin Forde (0-2, 0-1 free); Shane Burke, Stephen Forde (0-1)	Kenny Park; Referee: John Keane

14 September 2014; 17:00; Group B	Gort	0-25 - 1-8	Kilnadeema-Leitrim	Killimor; Referee: Michael Conway
14 September 2014; 17:00; Group B	Gerry Quinn (0-7, 0-6 frees); Albert Mullins, Michael Mullins, Ger O'Donoghue (0-4); Wayne Walsh (0-2); Seán Forde, Martin Nestor, J Commins (0-1); Greg Lally (0-1 free)		Brian Molloy (0-6, 0-1 free); Liam Kelly (1-0); David Tierney (0-2, 0-1 free)	Killimor; Referee: Michael Conway

14 September 2014; 17:00; Group B	Tommy Larkin's	0-22 - 0-20	Clarinbridge	Kenny Park; Referee: Christopher Browne
14 September 2014; 17:00; Group B	Jason Flynn (0-9, 0-7 frees); Kevin McHugo (0-4); Colm Flynn, Conor Gardiner, Gerard Kelly, Eamon Hayes (0-2); Kevin Hooban (0-1)		Paul Coen (0-7, 0-3 frees); Éanna Murphy (0-5); Alan Armstrong (0-3); Eoin Forde (0-2, 0-1 free); Christy Bannon (0-1); Cathal Coen, Aaron Bindon (0-1 free)	Kenny Park; Referee: Christopher Browne

==== Group C ====
Pos	Team	Pld	W	D	L	SF	SA	Diff	Pts
1	Craughwell	3	2	0	1	4-38	2-40	4	4
2	Beagh	2	1	1	0	3-27	2-24	6	3
3	Turloughmore	2	1	0	1	2-22	2-22	0	4
4	Tynagh-Abbey/Duniry	3	0	1	2	3-45	6-46	-10	1

- Game between Turloughmore and Beagh has been declared null and void.

24 May 2014; 19:00; Group C	Craughwell	0-12 - 0-10	Turloughmore	Kenny Park; Referee: Christopher Browne
24 May 2014; 19:00; Group C	Fergal Healy (0-4, 0-3 frees); Stephen Hynes, Niall Healy, Alan Callanan (0-2); Aidan Ryan (0-1 free); Michael Coughlan (0-1)		Gary Burke (0-3); Conor Shaughnessy (0-2 frees); Barry McDonough (0-2); Darren Shaughnessy, Sean Linnane (0-1)	Kenny Park; Referee: Christopher Browne

25 May 2014; 13:30; Group C	Tynagh-Abbey/Duniry	1-16 - 1-16	Beagh	Loughrea; Referee: John Keane
25 May 2014; 13:30; Group C	Shane Maloney (1-8, 0-6 frees); Padraig Breheny, Niall Moloney (0-3); Paul Killeen, Paul Gordon (0-1)		Kevin Keehan (0-7 frees); Joe Gantley (0-4); Kieran Diviney (1-1); Padraig Landers (0-2); Jamie Diviney, Adrian Tuohy (0-1)	Loughrea; Referee: John Keane

18 July 2014; 19:30; Group C	Turloughmore	2-12 - 2-10	Tynagh-Abbey/Duniry	Kenny Park; Referee: Christopher Browne
18 July 2014; 19:30; Group C	Jamie Holland (0-5, 0-3 frees); Conor Shaughnessy (1-2, 0-2 frees); Ronan Badger (1-0); Cian Burke (0-2); Darren Shaughnessy, Gary Burke, Brian Murphy (0-1)		Padraig Breheny, Pádraig Robinson (1-1); Shane Moloney (0-4 frees); Colm Larkin, Micheal Dervan (0-2)	Kenny Park; Referee: Christopher Browne

29 August 2014; 18:15; Group C	Beagh	2-11 - 1-08	Craughwell	Kenny Park; Referee: John Keane
29 August 2014; 18:15; Group C	Kevin Keehan (1-6, 0-6 frees); Pádraig Landers (1-1); Joe Gantley (0-3); Rory Gantley (0-1 free)		Kealan Cullinane (0-4 frees); Cian Larkin (1-0); Thomas Monaghan (0-3, 0-1 free); Fergal Healy (0-1)	Kenny Park; Referee: John Keane

- The original fixture on 19 July in Athenry was postponed due to torrential rain at half time. The score at the time was Craughwell 0-7 - 0-6 Beagh

14 September 2014; 15:30; Group C	Craughwell	3-18 - 0-19	Tynagh-Abbey/Duniry	Loughrea; Referee: Alan Kelly
14 September 2014; 15:30; Group C	Fergal Healy (0-7, 0-4 frees); Jamie Ryan, Cian Larkin, Michael Coughlan (1-0); Alan Callanan (0-3); Niall Callanan, Kealan Cullinane (0-2); Ian Daniels, Ger O'Halloran, Adrian Cullinane (0-1); Aidan Ryan (0-1 free)		Shane Moloney (0-13, 0-11 frees); Pádraig Robinson (0-2); Paul Killeen, Colm Larkin, Paul Gordon, Johnny Conroy (0-1)	Loughrea; Referee: Alan Kelly

===== Group C Null and Void Game =====
14 September 2014; 15:30; Group C	Turloughmore	Null and Void; 1-19 - 0-16	Beagh	Kenny Park; Referee: John Keane
14 September 2014; 15:30; Group C	Cian Burke (0-4); Dathaí Burke (1-2 frees); Brian Murphy, Darren Shaughnessy (0-2); Gary Burke, Michael Morris, Shane Burke (0-1)		Kevin Keehan (0-6, 0-4 frees); Rory Gantley (0-3); Pádraig Landers, Adrian Tuohy, Joe Gantley (0-2); Jamie Diviney (0-1)	Kenny Park; Referee: John Keane

- Turloughmore forfeited the fixture for playing an ineligible player without award of the game to Beagh. See section "Matthew Keating Controversy"

==== Group D ====
Pos	Team	Pld	W	D	L	SF	SA	Diff	Pts
1	Portumna	3	3	0	0	5-62	4-41	24	6
2	Ardrahan	3	2	0	1	6-47	2-37	22	4
3	Athenry	3	1	0	2	11-40	4-41	20	2
4	Carnmore	3	0	0	3	3-34	15-64	-66	0

23 May 2014; 19:00; Group D	Ardrahan	1-13 - 1-11	Athenry	Loughrea; Referee: Michael Haverty
23 May 2014; 19:00; Group D	Jonathan Glynn (1-2); Maurice Callanan (0-4 frees); Ger Hennelly (0-3); John Greene (0-2); Damien O'Shaughnessy, Stephen Whelan (0-1)		Cathal Keane (0-5, 0-4 frees); Conor Caulfield (0-3); Jack Carr (1-0); James Divilly (0-2); David Donoghue (0-1)	Loughrea; Referee: Michael Haverty

25 May 2014; 19:00; Group D	Portumna	2-28 - 2-14	Carnmore	Kenny Park; Referee: Gerry Donoghue
25 May 2014; 19:00; Group D	Joe Canning (1-8, 0-5 frees); Damien Hayes (1-3); Kevin Hayes (0-5); Ronan O'Meara (0-4, 0-1 free); Ollie Canning (0-3); Niall Hayes (0-2); Conor O'Hare, Oisín Royston, Patrick Dolphin (0-1)		Kevin Killilea (1-10, 0-8 frees); Barry Hanley (1-3); George Hanley (0-1)	Kenny Park; Referee: Gerry Donoghue

20 July 2014; 12:00; Group D	Portumna	1-17 - 1-14	Ardrahan	Loughrea; Referee: Leonard Fay
20 July 2014; 12:00; Group D	Andy Smith (0-5, 0-1 free); Joe Canning (0-4, 0-3 frees); Niall Hayes (1-1); Damien Hayes, Ronan O'Meara (0-3); Kevin Hayes (0-1)		Maurice Callanan (0-7, 0-4 frees); Jonathan Glynn (1-0); Jason Kennedy, Cian Walsh (0-2); Joe O'Leary, Gerry Hennelly, Gerard Forde (0-1)	Loughrea; Referee: Leonard Fay

20 July 2014; 14:30; Group D	Athenry	9-16 - 1-11	Carnmore	Kenny Park; Referee: John Keane
20 July 2014; 14:30; Group D	Cian Burke (5-2); Cathal Keane (0-7 frees); Jack Carr (2-0); David Donohue, Thomas Flynn (1-2); Conor Caulfield, Mark Hannon, Paddy Hannon (0-1)		Kevin Killilea (0-7, 0-6 frees); Donie Fox (0-3, 0-1 free); Aidan Reilly (1-0); George Hanley (0-1)	Kenny Park; Referee: John Keane

13 September 2014; 18:00; Group D	Portumna	2-17 - 1-13	Athenry	Ballinasloe; Referee: Eoin Shaughnessy
13 September 2014; 18:00; Group D	Joe Canning (1-9, 0-7 frees); Ronan O'Meara (1-2); Kevin Hayes, Damien Hayes (0-2); Ollie Canning, Niall Hayes (0-1)		Cathal Keane (0-4 frees); James Divilly (1-0); Liam Howley, Mark Hannon, Paddy Hannon (0-2); David Donoghue (0-2 frees); Tom Flynn (0-1 free)	Ballinasloe; Referee: Eoin Shaughnessy

13 September 2014; 18:00; Group D	Ardrahan	4-20 - 0-9	Carnmore	Kenny Park; Referee: Michael Haverty
13 September 2014; 18:00; Group D	Jonathan Glynn (3-2, 0-1 free); Maurice Callanan (1-5, 0-2 frees); Jason Kennedy (0-4); Cian Walsh (0-2); Gerard Forde, David Kennedy, Ger Hennelly, John Greene, Stephen Whelan, Richie Mullins (0-1)		Kevin Killilea (0-4, 0-3 frees); Gary Grealish (0-2); Ciaran Murray, Barry Hanley, K Concannon (0-1)	Kenny Park; Referee: Michael Haverty

=== Knockout stages ===
Quarter-finals
28 September - Kenny Park
Gort	3-11
Killimordaly	0-11
23 November - Kenny Park
Beagh	0-13
Ardrahan	0-9
28 September - Kenny Park
Portumna	2-15
Loughrea	1-17
28 September - Loughrea
Craughwell	0-19
Tommy Larkin's	1-13

Semi-finals
30 November - Kenny Park
Gort	1-15
Beagh	0-10
12 October - Kenny Park
Portumna	1-15
Craughwell	0-15

Final
14 December - Kenny Park
Gort	2-13
Portumna	1-10

==== Quarter-finals ====
An open draw of the 8 first and second placed teams from the Group Phase was made at Kenny Park, Athenry on 14 September 2014.

28 September 2014; 13:00; QF	Craughwell	0-19 - 1-13	Tommy Larkin's	Loughrea; Referee: Phelim Shaughnessy
28 September 2014; 13:00; QF	Kealan Cullinane (0-5); Fergal Healy (0-5 frees); Niall Callanan (0-3); Stephen Hynes, Alan Callanan (0-2); Ger O'Halloran (0-1); Aidan Ryan (0-1 free);		Jason Flynn (1-6, 0-5 frees); Conor Gardiner (0-3); Kevin Hooban, Gerard Kelly (0-2)	Loughrea; Referee: Phelim Shaughnessy

28 September 2014; 15:00; QF	Gort	3-11 - 0-11	Killimordaly	Kenny Park; Referee: Christopher Browne
28 September 2014; 15:00; QF	Gerry Quinn (1-6, 1-5 frees); Richard Cummins (2-2); Aidan Harte, Ger O'Donoghue, Jack Grealish (0-1)		Brian Burke (0-7, 0-5 frees); Paul Madden, Éanna Ryan, Thomas Madden, David Concannon (0-1)	Kenny Park; Referee: Christopher Browne

28 September 2014; 16:30; QF	Portumna	2-15 - 1-17	Loughrea	Kenny Park; Referee: John Keane
28 September 2014; 16:30; QF	Joe Canning (1-10, 0-5 frees); Ronan O'Meara (1-2); Ollie Canning (0-2); Damien Hayes (0-1)		Johnny Maher (1-8, 0-7 frees); Johnny Coen (0-4); Joseph Mooney, Neil Keary (0-2); Brian Mahony (0-1)	Kenny Park; Referee: John Keane

23 November 2014; 14:00; QF	Beagh	0-13 - 0-9	Ardrahan	Kenny Park; Referee: Leonard Fay
23 November 2014; 14:00; QF	Pádraig Landers, Adrian Tuohy (0-3); Kevin Keehan (0-3 frees); Rory Gantley (0-2 frees); Damien Landers, Joe Gantley (0-1)		Maurice Callanan (0-6 frees); Cian Walsh (0-2); Ger Hennelly (0-1)	Kenny Park; Referee: Leonard Fay

===== Quarter-final Null and Void game =====
27 September 2014; 15:00; Void QF	Turloughmore	Null and Void; 0-18 - 1-15	Ardrahan	Kenny Park; Referee: Michael Haverty
27 September 2014; 15:00; Void QF	Gary Burke (1-3); Ronan Badger (0-5, 0-1 frees); Cian Burke (0-2); Brian Murphy, Darren Shaughnessy, Barry McDonagh (0-1); Dathaí Burke, Conor Shaughnessy (0-1 free)		Maurice Callanan (0-9, 0-7 frees); Iarla Tannian, Jonathan Glynn (0-3); Jason Kennedy (0-2); Cian Walsh (0-1)	Kenny Park; Referee: Michael Haverty

- As a result of the Turloughmore v Beagh Group C game being voided, this game was also null and voided. See section Matthew Keating Controversy.

==== Semi-finals ====
An open draw of the quarter-final winners was made in Athenry on 28 September 2014

12 October 2014; 14:30; SF	Portumna	1-15 - 0-15	Craughwell	Kenny Park; Referee: Michael Haverty
12 October 2014; 14:30; SF	Joe Canning (1-8, 0-5 frees); Gareth Heagney, Damien Hayes, Kevin Hayes, Ronan O'Meara, Ollie Canning, Niall Hayes, Ivan Canning (0-1)	Report	Fergal Healy (0-8, 0-5 frees); Alan Callanan (0-3); Stephen Hynes, Kealan Cullinane (0-2)	Kenny Park; Referee: Michael Haverty

30 November 2014; 14:00; SF	Gort	1-15 - 0-10	Beagh	Kenny Park; Referee: Alan Kelly
30 November 2014; 14:00; SF	Gerry Quinn (0-7, 0-6 frees); Richard Cummins (0-4); Ger O'Donoghue (1-0); Aidan Harte, Michael Cummins, Albert Mullins, Michael Mullins (0-1)	Report	Kevin Keehan (0-6 frees); Pádraig Landers (0-2); Rory Gantley (0-1 free); Redmond McDermott (0-1)	Kenny Park; Referee: Alan Kelly

==== Final ====
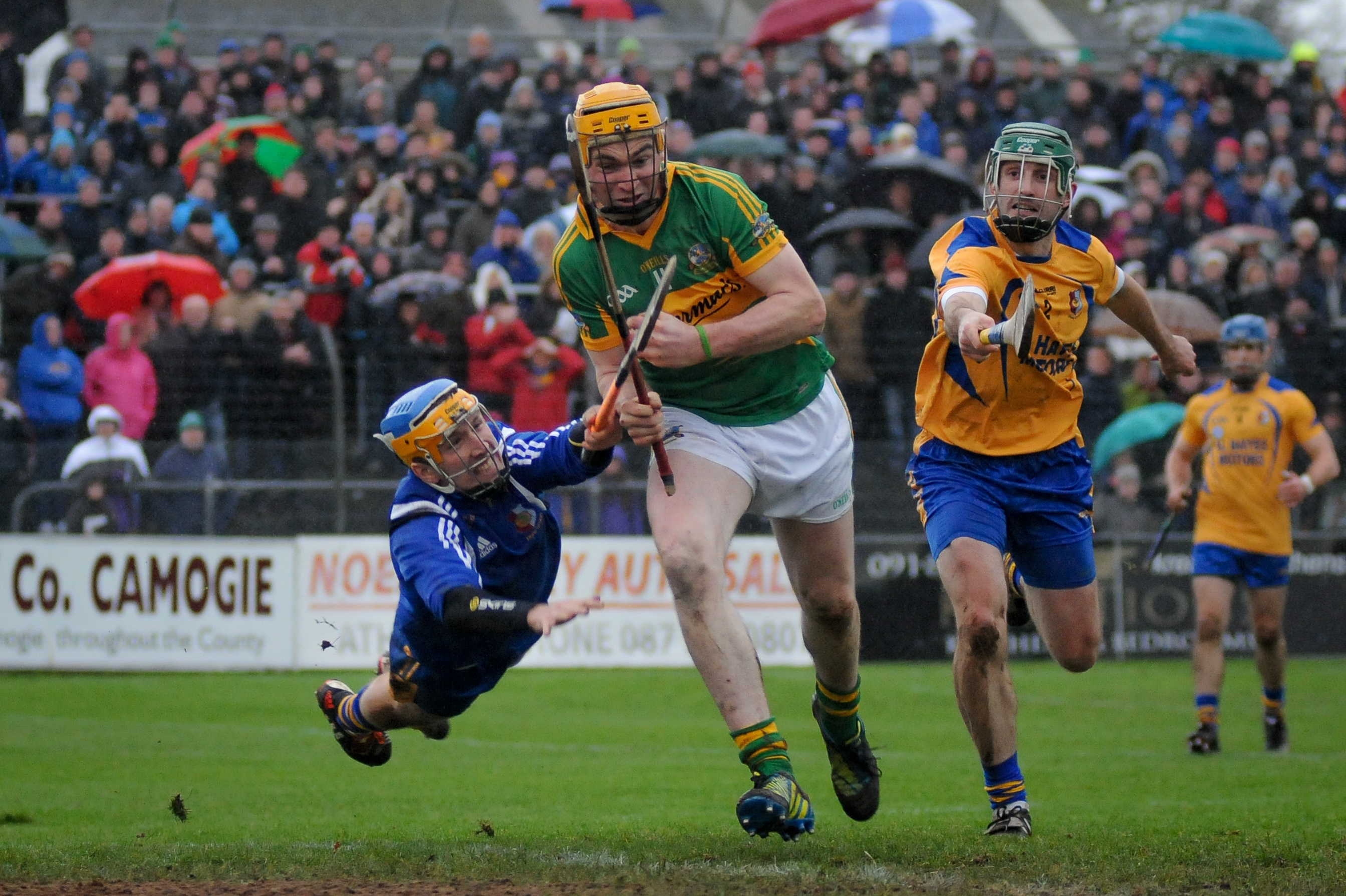
Albert Mullins of Gort eludes Portumna's Joe Keane and Gareth Heagney to score in the 2014 Galway Senior Hurling Championship final at Kenny Park, Athenry

The 2014 County final was played on 14 December 2014 in Kenny Park, Athenry due to the closure of Pearse Stadium. The game was shown deferred on TG4.

14 December 2014; 13:30; Final	Gort	2-13 1-10	Portumna	Kenny Park; Referee: Christy Browne
14 December 2014; 13:30; Final	Gerry Quinn (0-7 frees); Albert Mullins, Wayne Walsh (1-0); Greg Lally (0-2, 0-1 free); Richie Cummins (0-2); Aidan Harte, Paul Killilea (0-1)	Report	Joe Canning (0-6, 0-4 frees), Kevin Hayes (1-0); Damien Hayes (0-2); Ollie Canning, Ronan O'Meara (0-1)	Kenny Park; Referee: Christy Browne

Gort:
1	Gavin Lally
2	Mark McMahon
3	Tadhg Linnane
4	Micheal Cummins
5	Aidan Harte
6	Greg Lally (c)
7	Sylvie Óg Linnane
8	Sean Forde
18	Jason Grealish
10	Michael Mullins
11	Albert Mullins
12	Paul Killilea
13	Gerard O'Donoghue
14	Richie Cummins
15	Gerry Quinn
Substitutes Used:
17	Conor Helebert for Jason Grealish (46 mins)
20	Wayne Walsh for Gerard O'Donoghue (48 mins)
9	Niall Forde for Sean Forde (54 mins)
19	Jack Grealish for Albert Mullins (62 mins)
Management:
Michael Finn, Gerry Spelman, Mattie Murphy & Shane Counihan

Portumna:
1	Joe Keane
2	Gareth Heagney
3	Conor O'Hare
4	Peter Smith
5	Owen Treacy
6	Martin Dolphin
7	Eoin Lynch
8	Leo Smith
9	Damien Hayes
10	Kevin Hayes
11	Niall Hayes
12	Ollie Canning (c)
17	Ronan O'Meara
14	Joe Canning
15	Andy Smith
Substitutes Used:
13	Patrick Dolphin for Leo Smith (50-51 mins, blood)
13	Patrick Dolphin for Ronan O'Meara (56 mins)
Manager:
Michael Monaghan

=== Qualifier Group Phase ===
Six teams, the losers of the Preliminary to Round 2 game and the Round 2 games. An open draw made on Galway Bay FM on 14 May 2014 split the teams into two groups. The top two teams will progress to the Shield Competition. The 4 second and third placed teams will contest relegation.

==== Qualifier Group A ====
Pos	Team	Pld	W	D	L	SF	SA	Diff	Pts
1	Castlegar	2	2	0	0	3-37	3-32	5	4
2	Kinvara	2	1	0	1	7-27	3-34	5	2
3	Kiltormer	2	0	0	2	1-29	5-27	-10	0

14 September 2014; 14:00; Qual. Grp A	Castlegar	1-16 - 0-16	Kiltormer	Loughrea; Referee: Sean Moran

21 September 2014; Qual. Grp A	Castlegar	2-21 - 3-16	Kinvara

28 September 2014; 11:30; Qual. Grp A	Kinvara	4-11 - 1-13	Kiltormer	Loughrea; Referee: Leonard Fay

==== Qualifier Group B ====
Pos	Team	Pld	W	D	L	SF	SA	Diff	Pts
1	St. Thomas's	2	1	0	1	0-37	2-24	7	2
2	Pádraig Pearse's	2	1	0	1	4-27	2-32	1	2
3	Liam Mellows	2	1	0	1	2-27	2-23	-6	2

13 September 2014; 17:30; Qual. Grp B	Pádraig Pearse's	2-13 - 0-18	St. Thomas'	Loughrea; Referee: Leonard Fay

20 September 2014; Qual. Grp B	Liam Mellows	2-16 - 2-14	Pádraig Pearse's

28 September 2014; 12:00; Qual. Grp B	St. Thomas'	0-19 - 0-11	Liam Mellows	Clarinbridge; Referee: Gerry Donoghue

=== Relegation ===
The second and third placed teams from the Qualifier Group Phase cross played. The two losing teams played each other with the loser being relegated to Intermediate for 2015.

==== Semi-finals ====
11 October 2014; 15:00; Relegation SF	Kiltormer	1-17 - 2-10	Pádraig Pearse's	Loughrea

11 October 2014; 16:30; Relegation SF	Liam Mellows	2-17 - 2-14	Kinvara	Kenny Park

==== Final ====
25 October 2014; 14:30; Relegation Final	Pádraig Pearse's	0-14 - 1-9	Kinvara	Kenny Park; Referee: Leonard Fay
25 October 2014; 14:30; Relegation Final		Report		Kenny Park; Referee: Leonard Fay

- Kinvara are relegated.

=== Shield Competition ===
10 teams: the 8 third and fourth placed teams from the Group Phase and the top two teams from the Qualifier Group Phase. Two teams were drawn to play two others - the two winning teams plus the 6 other teams will play open drawn quarter-finals, semi-finals and a final.

==== Shield Preliminary Round and Quarter-finals ====
Carnmore, Clarinbridge, Sarsfields, Mullagh, Tynagh-Abbey/Duniry and Turloughmore were all eliminated before the semi-finals.

==== Shield Semi-Finals ====
8 February 2015; 15:30; Shield SF	Kilnadeema-Leitrim	1-15 - 2-8	Castlegar	Kilnadeema; Referee: Shane Hynes

8 February 2015; 15:30; Shield SF	St. Thomas'	1-17 - 1-14	Athenry	Athenry; Referee: Alan Kelly

==== Final ====
24 May 2015; 12:00; Shield Final	Kilnadeema-Leitrim	v	St. Thomas'	Loughrea

== Scoring ==
=== Top Scorers ===
Rank	Player	Team	Tally	Total	Matches	Average
1	Joe Canning	Portumna	4-55	69	7	9.8
=2	Jason Flynn	Tommy Larkin's	2-42	48	5	9.6
=2	Kevin Killilea	Carnmore	2-42	48	6	8
4	Brian Burke	Killimordaly	0-47	47	5	9.4
5	Kevin Keehan	Beagh	2-33	39	6	6.5
6	Cathal Dervan	Mullagh	2-31	37	4	9.25
=7	Johnny Maher	Loughrea	2-28	34	5	6.8
=7	Kerril Wade	Sarsfields	2-28	34	5	6.8

=== Individual feats ===
Cian Burke scored 5-2 from play for Athenry against Carnmore in their Group D clash on 20 July 2014
