= Pearse Piggott =

Irish hurler

Personal information
- Native name: Piaras Piogóid (Irish)
- Born: 8 February 1961 (age 65) Gort, County Galway, Ireland
- Occupation: Businessman
- Height: 5 ft 11 in (180 cm)

Sport
- Sport: Hurling
- Position: Midfield
Club
- Years: Club
- Gort
Club titles
- Galway titles: 2
- Connacht titles: 2
- All-Ireland Titles: 0
Inter-county
| Years | County | Apps (scores) |
| 1980-1988 | Galway | 7 (0-00) |
Inter-county titles
- All-Irelands: 0
- NHL: 1
- All Stars: 0

Pearse Piggott (born 8 February 1961) is an Irish former hurler who played as a midfielder for the Galway senior team.

Piggott joined the team during the 1980-81 National League and was a regular member of the team for much of the next decade. During that time he won one National Hurling League winners' medal on the field of play as well as back-to-back All-Ireland winners' medals as a non-playing substitute.

At club level Piggott is a two-time Connacht medalist with Gort. In addition to this he has also won two county club championship medals.
