= Aidan Harte =

Irish hurler (born 1988)

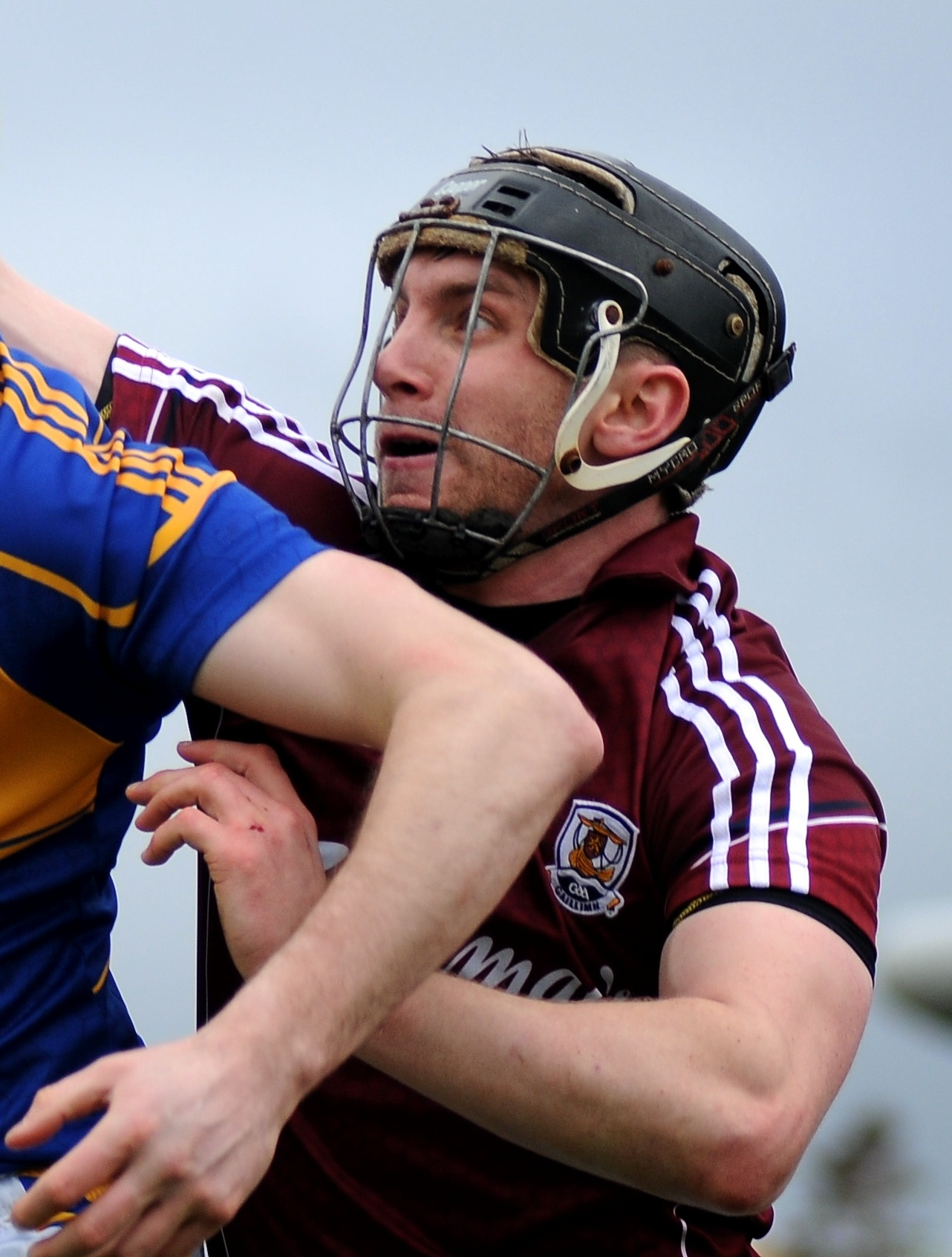
- Harte in 2014

Personal information
- Native name: Aodán Ó hAirt (Irish)
- Born: 17 August 1988 (age 38) Galway, Ireland
- Occupation: Secondary school teacher
- Height: 1.85 m (6 ft 1 in)

Sport
- Sport: Hurling
- Position: Left wing-back
Club
- Years: Club
- 2005-2022: Gort
Club titles
- Galway titles: 2
College(s)
- Years: College
- University College Cork; NUI Galway
College titles
- Fitzgibbon titles: 0
Inter-county*
Years	County	Apps (scores)
2008–2021	Galway	40 (2-15)
Inter-county titles
- Leinster titles: 3
- All-Irelands: 1
- NHL: 3
- All Stars: 0
- *Inter County team apps and scores correct as of 20:17, 8 January 2020.

Aidan Harte (born 17 August 1988) is an Irish hurler who plays for Galway Senior Championship Gort and previously at inter-county level with the Galway senior hurling team. He usually lines out as a left wing-back.

== Playing career ==
=== Gort ===
Harte joined the Gort club at a young age and played in all grades at juvenile and underage levels. HE joined the Gort senior team in advance of the 2005 Galway Championship.

On 2 November 2008, Harte played in his first senior final when Gort faced Portumna. Lining out in the unusual position of right corner-back, he was later deployed in his regular position of midfield but ended the game on the losing side after the 1–18 to 2–07 defeat.

After a three-year absence, Harte lined out in his second final on 6 November 2011. He scored five points from centre-forward, including two points from frees, and collected his first winners' medal after the 0–17 to 1–12 defeat of reigning champions Clarinbridge.

Harte was selected at right wing-back when he lined out in his third final on 14 December 2014. He scored a point from play and claimed a second winners' medal after the 2–13 to 1–10 defeat of Portumna.

On 16 October 2016, Harte was at left wing-back when he lined out in the fourth final of his career. He ended the game on the losing side for the second time in his career after the 1–11 to 0–10 defeat by St. Thomas's.

Harte lined out in a second successive final - the fifth of his career - on 3 December 2017. Playing at centre-forward, he ended the game on the losing side after being held scoreless in the 3–12 to 1–15 defeat by Liam Mellows.

=== Galway ===
==== Minor and under-21 ====
Harte first played for Galway as a member of the minor team during the 2005 All-Ireland Championship. He made his first appearance for the team on 23 July 2006 and scored 1-02 from right wing-forward in the 4–07 to 1–14 defeat of Antrim. Harte retained the right wing-forward berth for the 2005 All-Ireland final on 11 September 2006. He was held scoreless throughout the 2–18 to 2–07 defeat by Tipperary.

Harte immediately progressed onto the Galway under-21 team for the 2007 All-Ireland Championship. He made his debut in that grade on 25 August 2007 when he lined out at midfield for the 4–21 to 2-18 All-Ireland semi-final defeat of Cork. Harte was dropped from the starting fifteen for the All-Ireland final on 8 September 2007 but was introduced as a substitute at midfield for David Kennedy and claimed a winners' medal after the 5–11 to 0–12 defeat of Dublin.

Harte was a regular on the under-21 team over the following two seasons, but ended his time that grade without any further success.

==== Senior ====
In October 2007, it was revealed that Harte was one of 15 players from the successful under-21 team that was about to be drafted onto the Galway senior team as part of a major shake-up by team manager Ger Loughnane. He remained a member of the extended panel throughout the 2008 season before being released from the panel by new manager John McIntyre at the end of the season.

Harte was recalled to the Galway senior team in advance of the 2010 National League. He made his debut on 21 February 2010 when he scored a point from right corner-forward in a 1–18 to 1–11 defeat of Limerick. On 2 May 2010, Harte was switched to right wing-forward and scored three points in Galway's 2–22 to 1–17 defeat by Cork in the National League final. Harte made his Leinster Championship debut on 29 May 2010 when he lined out at right corner-forward in a 2–22 to 1–14 defeat of Wexford. On 4 July 2010, he lined out in his first Leinster final and scored a point from centre-forward in Galway's 1–19 to 1–12 defeat by Kilkenny.

On 8 July 2012, Harte was selected amongst the substitutes when Galway qualified to play Kilkenny in the Leinster final. He remained on the bench throughout but ended the game with a winners' medal after the 2–21 to 2–12 victory. On 9 September 2012, Harte was again an unused substitute when Galway drew 0–19 to 2–13 with Kilkenny in the All-Ireland final. The replay on 30 September 2012 saw Harte remain on the bench for the 3–22 to 3–11 defeat.

On 7 July 2013, Harte was selected on the substitutes' bench when Galway qualified to play Dublin in the Leinster final. He was introduced as a substitute at midfield for Iarla Tannian and scored a point from play in the 2–25 to 2–13 defeat.

Harte was back on the starting fifteen when Galway faced Kilkenny in the Leinster final on 5 July 2015. He was held scoreless from play in the 1–23 to 2–17 defeat. On 6 September 2015, Harte was switched to right wing-back when Galway once again faced Kilkenny in the All-Ireland final. For the second time in three seasons he ended the final on the losing side after the 1–22 to 1–18 defeat.

On 3 July 2016, Harte lined out in a second successive Leinster final against Kilkenny. Playing at left wing-back, he once again ended the game on the losing side after the 1–26 to 0–22 defeat.

On 22 April 2017, Harte scored two points from left wing-back when Galway won the National League title after a 3–21 to 0–14 victory over Tipperary in the final. The subsequent championship saw Galway qualify for a Leinster final meeting with Wexford, with Harte being deployed in the left corner-back position. He ended the game with a second winners' medal after the 0–29 to 1–17 victory. On 3 September 2017, Harte was switched to his usual position of left wing-back when Galway faced Waterford in the All-Ireland final. He ended the game with a winners' medal after the 0–26 to 2–17 victory and a first All-Ireland Championship for Galway in 29 years.

On 1 July 2018, Harte lined out at left wing-back for Galway in their 0-18 apiece draw with Kilkenny in the Leinster final. The replay a week later saw him end the game with a third provincial winners' medal after scoring two points from play in Galway's 1–28 to 3–15 victory. On 19 August 2018, Harte was again at left wing-back when Galway faced Limerick in the All-Ireland final. He ended the game on the losing side as Limerick won their first title in 45 years after a 3–16 to 2–18 defeat of Galway.

Harte announced his retirement form inter-county hurling in December 2021.

== Career statistics ==
As of match played 15 June 2019.

Team	Year	National League			Leinster		All-Ireland		Total	
Team	Year	Division	Apps	Score	Apps	Score	Apps	Score	Apps	Score
Galway	2008	Division 1A	0	0-00	0	0-00	0	0-00	0	0-00
Galway	2009	Division 1	—		—		—		—	
Galway	2010	Division 1	7	2-12	2	0-02	0	0-00	9	2-14
Galway	2011	Division 1	1	0-01	0	0-00	2	1-00	3	1-01
Galway	2012	Division 1A	2	0-01	0	0-00	0	0-00	2	0-01
Galway	2013	Division 1A	6	0-06	2	0-01	1	0-01	9	0-08
Galway	2014	Division 1A	7	0-01	2	0-00	1	0-00	10	0-01
Galway	2015	Division 1A	6	0-04	4	0-03	3	0-02	13	0-09
Galway	2016	Division 1A	6	0-04	3	0-00	2	0-01	11	0-05
Galway	2017	Division 1B	7	0-06	3	0-03	2	0-00	12	0-09
Galway	2018	Division 1B	5	0-04	6	0-02	3	0-00	14	0-06
Galway	2019	Division 1B	6	0-03	4	0-00	—		10	0-03
Career total			53	2-42	26	0-11	14	1-04	93	3-57

== Honours ==
Gort

- Galway Senior Hurling Championship (2): 2011, 2014

Galway (New York)

- New York Senior Hurling Championship (1): 2014

Galway

- All-Ireland Senior Hurling Championship (1): 2017
- Leinster Senior Hurling Championship (3): 2012, 2017, 2018
- National Hurling League (3): 2010, 2017, 2021
- All-Ireland Under-21 Hurling Championship (1): 2007
