= Jack Grealish (hurler) =

Irish hurler (born 1997)

Personal information
- Native name: Seán Mag Riallais (Irish)
- Born: 1997 (age 28–29) Gort, County Galway, Ireland
- Occupations: Fuel merchant, driver

Sport
- Sport: Hurling
- Position: Right corner-back
Club
- Years: Club
- 2014-present: Gort
Club titles
- Galway titles: 1
Inter-county*
Years	County	Apps (scores)
2017–present	Galway	1 (0-01)
Inter-county titles
- Leinster titles: 1
- All-Irelands: 1
- NHL: 1
- All Stars: 0
- *Inter County team apps and scores correct as of 17:38, 14 January 2020.

Jack Grealish (born 1997) is an Irish hurler who plays for Galway Senior Championship club Gort and at senior level for the Galway county team. He usually lines out as a right corner-back.

Grealish won an All-Ireland Senior Hurling Championship medal with Galway in 2017, shortly after winning National Hurling League and Leinster Senior Hurling Championship medals with the same team.

== Career ==
With his club, Grealish won a Galway Senior Hurling Championship medal in 2014.

As a youth he won All-Ireland Minor Hurling Championship and Leinster Under-21 Hurling Championship medals with his county.

Grealish won an All-Ireland Senior Hurling Championship medal with Galway in 2017, shortly after winning National Hurling League and Leinster Senior Hurling Championship medals with the same team.

By 2022, Grealish had secured a starting berth for the Galway senior hurlers.

== Personal life ==
Grealish has worked as a self-employed driver, driving an articulated truck. However, in 2022, he was banned for driving for two years for a second instance of driving without insurance. His solicitor explained to the court that his own truck was insured but that, mistakenly thinking he was covered by that insurance, Grealish had been caught the second time while using his brother's vehicle with the intention of collecting a takeaway meal he had ordered for consumption elsewhere. However, the judge was obliged, under the law, to disqualify Grealish from driving for two years, and to issue a fine of €200.

== Career statistics ==
As of match played 15 June 2019.

Team	Year	National League			Leinster		All-Ireland		Total	
Team	Year	Division	Apps	Score	Apps	Score	Apps	Score	Apps	Score
Galway	2017	Division 1B	1	0-00	0	0-00	0	0-00	1	0-00
Galway	2018	Division 1B	3	0-00	—		—		3	0-00
Galway	2019	Division 1B	5	0-00	1	0-01	—		6	0-01
Total			9	0-00	1	0-01	0	0-00	10	0-01

== Honours ==
Gort

- Galway Senior Hurling Championship (1): 2014

Galway

- All-Ireland Senior Hurling Championship (1): 2017
- Leinster Senior Hurling Championship (1): 2017
- National Hurling League (1): 2017
- Leinster Under-21 Hurling Championship (1): 2018
- All-Ireland Minor Hurling Championship (1): 2015
