= Bernie Forde =

Irish hurler

Personal information
- Native name: Beircheart Mac Giollarnáth (Irish)
- Born: 5 November 1957 (age 68) Ardrahan, County Galway, Ireland
- Occupation: Civil servant
- Height: 5 ft 10 in (178 cm)

Sport
- Sport: Hurling
- Position: Right corner-forward
Club
- Years: Club
- Ardrahan
Club titles
- Galway titles: 3
- Connacht titles: 3
Inter-county*
| Years | County | Apps (scores) |
| 1978–1985 | Galway | 17 (6–26) |
Inter-county titles
- All-Irelands: 1
- NHL: 0
- All Stars: 1
- *Inter County team apps and scores correct as of 22:14, 3 February 2014.

Bernie Forde (born 5 November 1957) is an Irish retired hurler who played as a right corner-forward for the Galway senior team.

Born in Ardrahan, County Galway, Forde first played competitive hurling in his youth. He made his first impression on the inter-county scene when he joined the Galway under-21 team, and made his senior debut during the 1978 championship. Forde went on to play a key role for Galway for the next few years, and won one All-Ireland medal. He was an All-Ireland runner-up on three occasions.

As a member of the Connacht inter-provincial team at various times throughout his career, Forde won two Railway Cup medals. At club level Forde, is a three-time Connacht medallist with Ardrahan, and has won three championship medals.

Throughout his career Forde made 17 championship appearances for Galway.

Forde retired following the conclusion of the 1985 championship and became involved in team management and coaching. He has served as manager of the Ardrahan intermediate camogie team.

== Playing career ==
=== Club ===
Forde enjoyed much success at underage levels with Ardrahan, winning championship medals in the minor and under-21 grades.

In 1974 Forde was a member of the Ardrahan senior team that made a long-awaited breakthrough in the championship. A 2–10 to 1–10 defeat of three-in-a-row hopefuls Castlegar gave him a championship medal. Forde later added a Connacht medal to his collection following a 9–12 to 1–6 trouncing of Tooreen.

Ardrahan retained the county championship crown in 1975, with Forde collecting a second winners' medal following a narrow 4–5 to 1–11 defeat of Carnmore. He later won a second consecutive Connacht medal, as Athleague succumbed to a 2–14 to 1–4 defeat.

Three-in-a-row proved beyond Ardrahan, however, Forde won a third championship medal in 1978, as Ballinderreen were defeated in a replay of the final. Tooreen faced a 2–9 to 1–7 defeat in the subsequent provincial decider, with Forde collecting a third Connacht medal.

=== Inter-county ===
Forde first came to prominence on the inter-county scene as captain of the Galway under-21 hurling team that reached the All-Ireland decider in 1978. Tipperary provided the opposition on that occasion, however, the game ended in a draw. At the second time of asking Galway emerged victorious by 3–15 to 2–8 and Forde collected an All-Ireland Under-21 Hurling Championship medal.

Forde made his senior inter-county debut on 6 August 1978 in a 4–20 to 4–13 defeat by Kilkenny in the All-Ireland semi-final.

In 1979 Galway shocked four-in-a-row hopefuls Cork in the All-Ireland semi-final and qualified for an All-Ireland final showdown with Kilkenny. In one of the worst All-Ireland finals of the decade, Tipperary-born Galway goalkeeper Séamus Shinnors had an absolute nightmare of a game. A 70-yards free by Liam "Chunky" O'Brien after just four minutes dipped, hit off Shinnors and ended up in the Galway net. Galway fought back and went two points up twelve minutes into the second half, however, they failed to score for the rest of the game. Four minutes before the end of the game another long-range free for Kilkenny ended up in the net behind Shinnors. It was a score which summed up the day for Forde's side as Kilkenny went on to win by 2–12 to 1–8.

In 1980 Galway defeated Kildare and Offaly to reach a second consecutive All-Ireland final. Munster champions Limerick provided the opposition on this occasion and an exciting championship decider followed. Goals by Forde and P. J. Molloy meant that the men from the west led by 2–7 to 1–5 at half-time. Éamonn Cregan single-handedly launched the Limerick counter-attack in the second-half. Over the course of the game he scored 2–7, including an overhead goal and a point in which he showed the ball to full-back Conor Hayes and nonchalantly drove the ball over the bar. It was not enough to stem the tide and Galway went on to win the game by 2–15 to 3–9. It was Galway's first All-Ireland title since 1923, with Forde picking up a winners' medal and the celebrations surpassed anything ever seen in Croke Park. He later picked up an All-Star award.

1981 saw Galway reach a third consecutive All-Ireland final and Offaly were the opponents. Everything seemed to be going well for Forde's side as Galway hoped to capture a second consecutive All-Ireland title. Offaly 'keeper Damien Martin was doing great work in batting out an almost certain Galway goal early in the second-half. With twenty-three minutes left in the game Galway led by six points, however, they failed to score for the rest of the game. Johnny Flaherty hand-passed Offaly's second goal with just three minutes remaining. At the long whistle Galway were defeated by 2–12 to 0–15.

Galway shocked reigning All-Ireland champions Cork in the semi-final to reach the decider once again in 1985. Offaly provided the opposition in the subsequent All-Ireland final and another tense game ensued. Once again it was Offaly's goal-scoring ability that proved crucial. Pat Cleary scored the first of the day after twenty-five minutes of play and got his second less than half a minute after the restart. Joe Dooley had a goal disallowed halfway through the second-half while a long Joe Cooney effort, which seemed to cross the goal line, was not given. P. J. Molloy was Galway's goal scorer, however, the day belonged to Offaly. A 2–11 to 1–12 score line resulted in defeat for Galway. This was Forde's last game for Galway.

=== Inter-provincial ===
Forde also lined out with Connacht in the inter-provincial series of games and enjoyed much success.

In 1982 Forde was a member of the substitutes as Connacht reached the inter-provincial decider. He was sprung from the bench to collect his first Railway Cup medal following a 3–8 to 2–9 defeat of Leinster. Forde broke on to the starting fifteen in 1983. A 0–10 to 1–5 defeat of Leinster once again allowed Connacht to retain the title for the first time in their history.

== Honors ==
=== Player ===
Ardrahan

- Connacht Senior Club Hurling Championship (3): 1974, 1975, 1978
- Galway Senior Club Hurling Championship (3): 1974, 1975, 1978
- Galway Intermediate Club Hurling Championship (1): 1979
- Galway Under-21 Club Hurling Championship (1): 1977
- Galway Minor Club Hurling Championship (1): 1975

Galway

- All-Ireland Senior Hurling Championship (1): 1980
- All-Ireland Under-21 Hurling Championship (1): 1978 (c)

Connacht

- Railway Cup (2): 1982, 1983

=== Manager ===
Ardrahan

- Connacht Intermediate Club Camogie Championship (1): 2011
- Galway Intermediate Club Camogie Championship (1): 2011

=== Individual ===
Awards

- All-Star (2): 1981, 1987

Achievements
| Preceded by Mickey Lyng (Kilkenny) | All-Ireland Under-21 Hurling Final winning captain 1978 | Succeeded by Michael Doyle (Tipperary) |
