= Gort GAA =

Gaelic sports club in County Galway, Ireland

Gort
- Gort Inse Guaire
- County: Galway
- Nickname: Gort Inse Guaire
- Grounds: Laghtyshaughnessy, Gort

Playing kits
Standard colours	Change

Senior Club Championships
	All Ireland	Connacht champions	Galway champions
Hurling:	0	2	7

Gort GAA Club is a Gaelic games club located in Gort, County Galway, Ireland. It is a member of the Galway branch of the Gaelic Athletic Association (GAA). Founded at the turn of the 20th century, the club is almost exclusively concerned with the sport of hurling.

The club competes in competitions run by Galway GAA, and has won the Galway Senior Hurling Club Championship and Connacht Senior Club Hurling Championship on several occasions.

== History ==
While hurling has been played in Gort since at least the formation of the GAA in the 1880s, the modern club was formed at the turn of the 20th century. The club won its first Galway Senior Hurling Championship (Galway SHC) in 1914, going on to win several other titles.

After winning the 1983 Galway SHC, the club reached the 1984 All-Ireland Senior Club Hurling Championship final, losing in a replay to Ballyhale Shamrocks GAA.

In November 2011, Gort won their first Galway Senior Hurling final since 1983 with a 0–17 to 1–12 win against Clarinbridge. Gort won their next Senior Galway title in 2014, and went on to represent Connacht in the 2014–15 All-Ireland Senior Club Hurling Championship.

== Hurling titles ==
- Connacht Senior Club Hurling Championship (2): 1982, 1984
- Galway Senior Hurling Championship (7): 1914, 1916, 1934, 1981, 1983, 2011, 2014

== Notable players ==
- John Commins
- Richie Cummins
- Ollie Fahy
- Josie Gallagher
- Jack Grealish
- Aidan Harte
- Tom Helebert
- Greg Lally
- Sylvie Linnane
- Pearse Piggott
- Gerard Quinn
