= Greg Lally =

Galway hurler (born 1988)

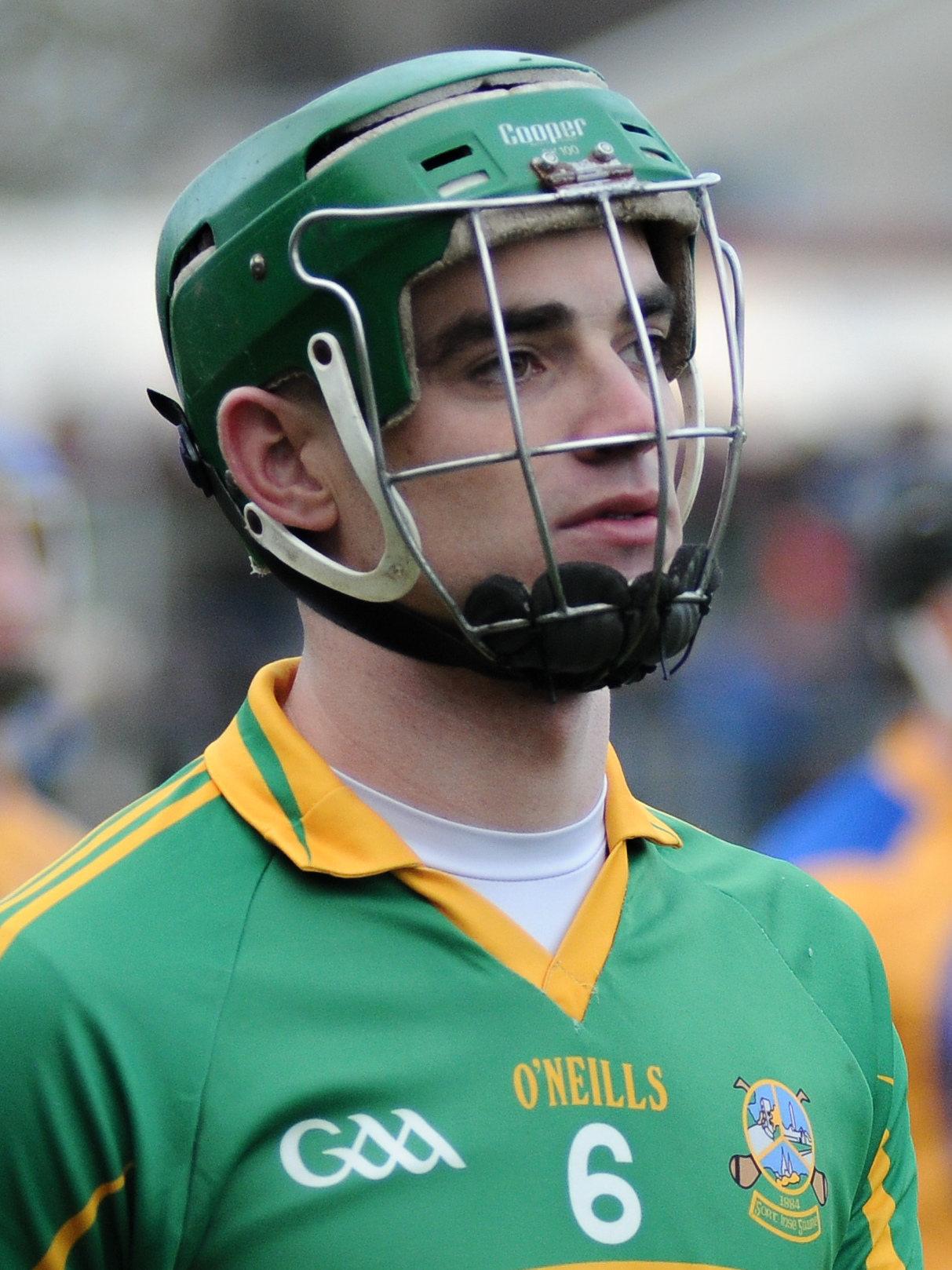

Personal information
- Native name: Gregóir Ó Maolalaidh (Irish)
- Born: 7 February 1988 (age 38) Galway, Ireland
- Height: 1.85 m (6 ft 1 in)

Sport
- Sport: Hurling
- Position: Left half back
Club
- Years: Club
- 2005–: Gort
Club titles
- Galway titles: 2
Inter-county
- Years: County
- 2015–: Galway
Inter-county titles
- Leinster titles: 1
- All-Irelands: 1
- NHL: 1

Greg Lally (born 7 February 1988) is an Irish hurler who plays as a midfielder at senior level for the Galway county team.

Born in Gort, County Galway, Lally first played competitive hurling in his youth. He was a key member of the Gort Community School senior team. At club level he is a two-time championship medallist with Gort.

Lally made his debut on the inter-county scene at the age of seventeen when he first linked up with the Galway minor team who won the 2005 All Ireland. An All-Ireland runner-up in this grade in 2006, he later joined the under-21 side. Lally made his senior championship debut during the 2015 championship.

On 3 September 2017, Lally was a substitute for Galway as they won their first All-Ireland Senior Hurling Championship in 29 years against Waterford.

== Honours ==
Gort

- Galway Senior Hurling Championship (2): 2011, 2014

Galway

- All-Ireland Minor Hurling Championship (sub) (1) 2005
- All-Ireland Senior Hurling Championship (1): 2017 (sub)
- National Hurling League Division 1 (2): 2010, 2017 (sub)
- Leinster Senior Hurling Championship (3): 2012, 2017 (sub) 2018 (Sub)
