= Turloughmore Hurling Club =

Gaelic sports club in County Galway, Ireland

Turloughmore
- Turlach Mór
- Founded: 1886
- County: Galway
- Nickname: Turlough
- Colours
- Grounds: Lackagh Grounds

Playing kits
Standard colours

Senior Club Championships
	All Ireland	Connacht champions	Galway champions
Hurling:	0	1	8

Turloughmore GAA is a Gaelic Athletic Association club in Turloughmore, County Galway, Ireland. The club is exclusively concerned with the game of hurling.

== History ==
Located in the village of Turloughmore, about ten miles northeast of Galway city, Turloughmore GAA Club was founded on 14 May 1886. Hurling, however, had been played in the area long before the establishment of an official club. The new club reached their first Galway SHC final in 1893, but lost to College Road.

Turloughmore's first success came in 1907, when the club won the Galway JHC title. Two more such tiles were subsequently won in 1949 and 1954. Turloughmore won their inaugural Galway SHC title in 1956, however, the title was won in the boardroom rather than on the field of play, after Ardrahan were unable to field a team for the proposed replay after an initial drawn match. Turloughmore subsequently became the dominant team of the sixties, winning a record-setting six consecutive Galway SHC titles between 1961 and 1966.

After a 19-year lapse, Turloughmore claimed their eighth Galway SHC title in 1985, which was later followed by a Connacht Club SHC title. Although this remains the club's last senior title, Turloughmore claimed further Galway JHC titles in 1991 and 1997. The club has also maintained a strong presence at underage levels and has won seven Galway MAHC titles between 1981 and 2014.

== Honours ==
- Connacht Senior Club Hurling Championship (): 1985
- Galway Senior Hurling Championship (8): 1956, 1961, 1962, 1963, 1964, 1965, 1966, 1985
- Galway Junior Club Hurling Championship (5): 1907, 1949, 1954, 1991, 1997
- Galway Minor Club Hurling Championship (7): 1981, 1984, 1996, 1997, 2007, 2013, 2014

== Notable players ==
- Daithí Burke: All-Ireland SHC-winner (2017)
- Frank Burke: All-Ireland SHC-winner (1980)
- Martin Naughton: All-Ireland SHC-winner (1987, 1988)
