= Johnny Coen =

Irish sportsperson

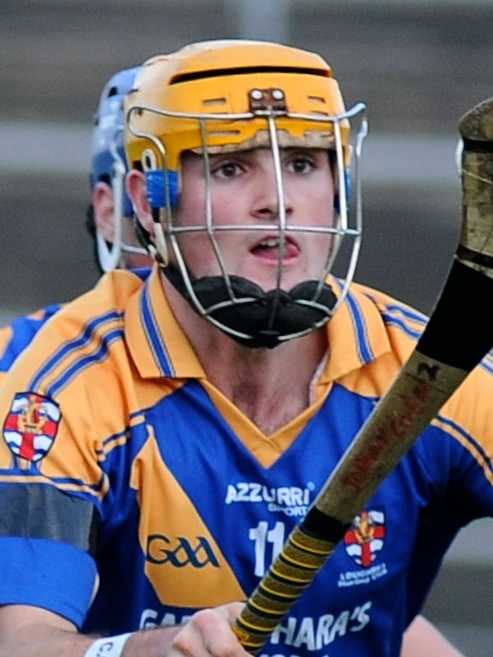
- Johnny Coen in action for Loughrea in 2013

Personal information
- Native name: Seán Ó Comdhain (Irish)
- Nickname: Vacuum
- Born: 19 March 1991 (age 35) Loughrea, County Galway, Ireland
- Occupation: Secondary school teacher
- Height: 1.83 m (6 ft 0 in)

Sport
- Sport: Hurling
- Position: Midfield
Club
- Years: Club
- 2008–present: Loughrea
Club titles
- Galway titles: 1
College
- Years: College
- University of Limerick
College titles
- Fitzgibbon titles: 0
Inter-county*
Years	County	Apps (scores)
2011–2022	Galway	43 (2–11)
Inter-county titles
- Connacht titles: 3
- All-Irelands: 1
- NHL: 2
- All Stars: 0
- *Inter County team apps and scores correct as of 10:33, 22 December 2019 Job = Engineering teacher at St Brigids College Loughrea.

Johnny Coen (born 19 March 1991) is an Irish sportsman who plays hurling with his local club Loughrea and formerly at senior level with the Galway county team.

== Playing career ==
=== Loughrea ===
Coen joined the Loughrea club at a young age and played in all grades at juvenile and underage levels. On 8 November 2009, he was at full-back when Loughrea faced St Thomas' in the Minor A Championship final. Coen was switched to midfield during the match and claimed a winners' medal after the 3–12 to 1–15 victory.

On 15 November 2009, Coen was selected at left wing-forward when Loughrea qualified to play Portumna in the Galway Senior Championship final. He was held scoreless throughout and ended the game on the losing side after a 5–19 to 1–12 defeat.

Coen lined out in a second successive final on 31 October 2010. Playing at left corner-forward, he scored a late goal from a penalty to secure a 1–14 to 2–11 draw with Clarinbridge. Coen was switched to right wing-forward for the replay on 21 November 2010, however, he ended the game on the losing side after an 0–18 to 0–15 defeat.

On 18 November 2012, Coen lined out at right wing-back when Loughrea faced first-time finalists St. Thomas' in the county final. For the third time in his club career, Coen ended the final on the losing side after a 3–11 to 2–11 defeat.

For the fourth time in five championship seasons, Loughrea qualified for a county final appearance on 28 October 2013. Lining out at left wing-forward, Coen scored a point from a penalty in the 3–12 to 0–14 defeat by Portumna.

Coen lined out at full back in the 2024 Galway Senior Hurling Championship final victory over Cappataggle on 11 November 2024.

=== Galway ===
Coen first played for Galway at minor level in 2009. It was a successful year for the young Tribesmen as they reached the All-Ireland final. Kilkenny provided the opposition, however, Galway won by 2–15 to 2–11, giving Coen an All-Ireland Minor Hurling Championship medal.

The following year, Coen joined the county under-21 team. Once again, Galway reached the All-Ireland final where Tipperary provided the opposition. That game ended in a rout as Tipp won by 5–22 to 0–12. In 2011, Coen was again a key member of the county Under 21 team which made up for the previous year's defeat by winning the All-Ireland Under 21 Championship, defeating Dublin in the final.

Coen made his senior championship debut against Westmeath in the Leinster quarter-final in 2011. In 2012, Coen was part of the Galway team which won the Leinster Senior Hurling Championship for an historic first time, defeating Kilkenny in the final. Coen played at left-corner back in that final and was an ever present member of the Galway team which reached the All-Ireland Final that September. After an enthralling 2–13 to 0–19 draw in the All-Ireland Final, Galway suffered a heavy defeat to Kilkenny in the replay. Coen's performances throughout the 2012 Championship were widely regarded as outstanding, and he was rewarded with the 2012 Young Hurler of the Year Award in October 2012.

On 3 September 2017, Coen started for Galway as they won their first All-Ireland Senior Hurling Championship in 29 years against Waterford, lifting the cup with his five siblings (Rōise, Justin, Jordan, Diane, and Kate)

On 20 December 2022, Coen announced his retirement from inter-county hurling.

== Career statistics ==
As of match played 15 June 2019.

Team	Year	National League			Leinster		All-Ireland		Total	
Team	Year	Division	Apps	Score	Apps	Score	Apps	Score	Apps	Score
Galway	2011	Division 1	7	0-04	1	0-00	1	0-00	9	0-04
Galway	2012	Division 1A	7	0-02	2	0-00	3	0-00	12	0-02
Galway	2013	Division 1A	6	0-00	2	0-00	1	0-00	9	0-00
Galway	2014	Division 1A	7	0-02	3	0-01	1	0-00	11	0-03
Galway	2015	Division 1A	6	0-00	4	1-00	3	0-00	13	1-00
Galway	2016	Division 1A	1	0-00	3	0-00	2	0-01	6	0-01
Galway	2017	Division 1B	8	1-05	3	0-02	2	0-03	13	1-10
Galway	2018	Division 1B	6	0-06	5	0-00	3	0-02	14	0-08
Galway	2019	Division 1B	3	0-03	4	1-02	—		7	1-05
Total			51	1-22	27	2-05	16	0-06	94	3-33

== Honours ==
Inter-county

- All-Ireland Senior Hurling Championship (1): 2017
- National Hurling League Division 1 (2): 2017, 2021
- Leinster Senior Hurling Championship (2): 2012, 2017
- All-Ireland Under-21 Hurling Championship (1): (2011)
- All-Ireland Minor Hurling Championship (1): (2009)

Club

- Galway Senior Hurling Championship (1): 2024
- 1 Galway Minor A Hurling Championship (2009)

Individual

- 1 All Stars Young Hurler of the Year (2012)

Awards
Preceded by Liam Rushe (Dublin)	All Stars Young Hurler of the Year; 2012	Succeeded by Tony Kelly (Clare)
