= Paul Hoban =

Galway hurler

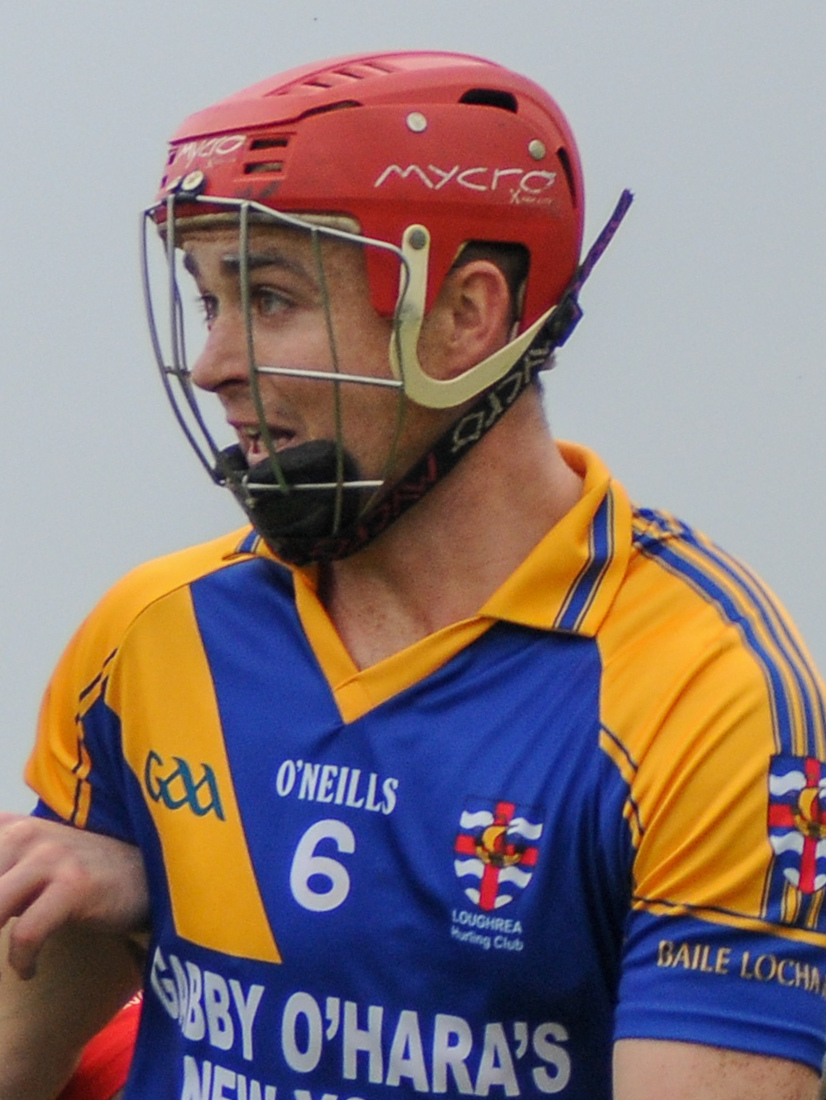
- Paul Hoban in 2015

Personal information
- Born: 3 January 1991 (age 35) Loughrea

Sport
- Sport: Hurling
- Position: Right half back
Club
- Years: Club
- Loughrea
Inter-county
- Years: County
- 2012–: Galway
Inter-county titles
- Leinster titles: 1
- All-Irelands: 0
- NHL: 0
- All Stars: 0

Paul Hoban is an Irish hurler who is a member at senior level of the Galway county team and also plays with his club Loughrea.

He was an unused substitute in the 2012 All-Ireland Senior Hurling Championship final against Kilkenny.

== Honours ==
Loughrea

- Galway Senior Hurling Championship: 2024
- Galway Minor Hurling Championship: 2009

Galway

- Leinster Senior Hurling Championship: 2012
