= 2013 Galway Senior Hurling Championship =

Annual hurling competition season

Tournament details
- County: Galway
- Year: 2013

Winners
- Champions: Portumna (5th win)
- Manager: Frank Canning
- Captain: Ollie Canning

Promotion/Relegation
- Promoted team(s): N/A
- Relegated team(s): Moycullen

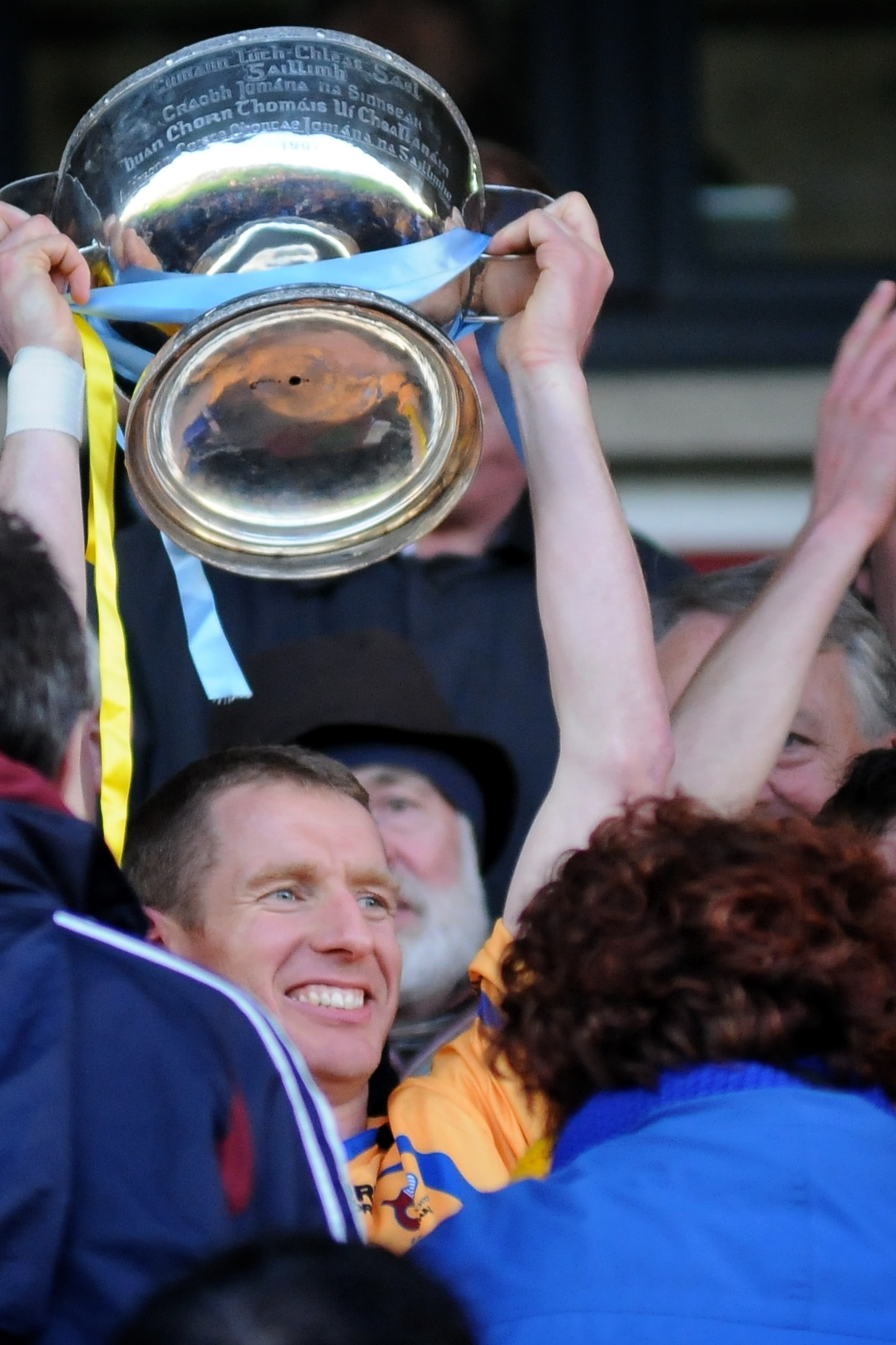
Ollie Canning accepting the 2013 Galway Senior Hurling Championship trophy on behalf of Portumna at Pearse Stadium, Galway

The 2013 Galway Senior Hurling Championship was the 116th staging of the Galway Senior Hurling Championship since its establishment in 1887. The championship began on 28 April 2013 and ended on 28 October 2013.

St. Thomas's were the defending champions, however, they were defeated in the semi-final stage. Portumna won the title, following a 3–12 to 0–14 defeat of Loughrea in the final.

== Results ==
=== Preliminary to Round 1 ===
27 April	Loughrea	1-13 - 0-9	Liam Mellows	Gort; Referee: Kevin Egan
27 April	Johnny Maher 0-7 (6f), Johnny Coen 1-2, Jamie Ryan 0-2, Neil Keary 0-1, Paul Hoban 0-1		Tadhg Haran 0-5 (4f), Niall Mcinerney 0-2, David Collins 0-1	Gort; Referee: Kevin Egan

=== Round 1 ===
28 April	Portumna	2-17 -0-12	Kinvara	Loughrea; Referee: Michael Haverty
28 April	Joe Canning 2-10 (8f), Damien Hayes 0-3, Andy Smith 0-2 (1f), Ronan O Meara 0-1, Niall Hayes 0-1		Conor Kavanagh 0-8 (8f), Conor Whelan 0-1, David Huban 0-1, Niall Bermingham 0-1	Loughrea; Referee: Michael Haverty

28 April	Gort	0-13 - 0-9	Athenry	Loughrea; Referee: Peter Murphy
28 April	Gerry Quinn 0-6 (6f), Richie Cummins 0-4, Albert Mullins 0-1, Martin Nestor 0-1, Niall Forde 0-1		Cathal Keane 0-7 (6f), Jack Carr 0-1, Aidan Higgins 0-1	Loughrea; Referee: Peter Murphy

28 April	Casltegar	4-18 - 2-14	Sarsfields	Atheny; Referee: Christy Browne
28 April	Ger Farragher 0-8 (5f, 3 sideline), Jason O Gorman 1-2, Dean Higgins 0-4, Enda Concannon 1-1, Kevin Brady 1-0, Ronan O Flynn 1-0, David O Gorman 0-2, Kevin Keane 0-1		Kerrill Wade 0-8 (8f), Joseph Cooney 1-3, Noel Kelly 1-1, E Cleary 0-1, S Kelly 0-1	Atheny; Referee: Christy Browne

27 April	Kiltormer	2-12 -1-14	Tynagh-Abbey/Duniry	Ballinasloe; Referee: J Keane
27 April	Michael Dolan 1-2, Sean Claffey 1-1, Patrick Cormican 0-3, Keith Kilkenny 0-2 (2f), Conor Ryan 0-2, David Hayes 0-1, Brendan Kenny 0-1		Paul Killeen 0-5 (3f), Shane Maloney 1-1 (1-0f), Padraig Robinson 0-3 (3f), Padraig Brehony 0-2, Colm Larkin 0-1, Ger Burke 0-1	Ballinasloe; Referee: J Keane

27 April	Clarinbridge	0-15 - 0-13	Tommy Larkin's	Ballinasloe; Referee: M Dolan
27 April	Paul Coen 0-8 (5f), Alan Armstrong 0-2, Shane Burke 0-2, Eanna Murphy 0-1, Billy Lane 0-1, Jamie Cannon 0-1		Jason Flynn 0-5 (4f, 1 sideline), Eamon Hayes 0-3, Stephen Page 0-2, Peter English 0-1, Eugene Gorman 0-1, Michael Garvey 0-1	Ballinasloe; Referee: M Dolan

28 April	St. Thomas'	1-15 - 0-12	Ardrahan	Athenry; Referee: A Kelly
28 April	Conor Cooney 1-12 (10f, 1 sideline), David Burke 0-1, Richie Murray 0-1, Gerald Murray 0-1		Maurice Callanan 0-6 (3f), Joe O Leary 0-2 (2f), Richard Mullins 0-2, Damien O Shaughnessy 0-1, Jason Kennedy 0-1	Athenry; Referee: A Kelly

27 April	Mullagh	1-17 - 1-11	Beagh	Loughrea; Referee: S Moran
27 April	Cathal Dervan 0-6 (4f), Cathal Kennedy 1-2, Davy Glennon 0-4, Niall Cahalan 0-1, Conor Dervan 0-1 (1f), Donal Reilly 0-1, Stephen Cahalan 0-1, Justin Gaynor 0-1		Kevin Keehan 0-6 (5f), Joe Gantly 1-2, Rory Gantly 0-3 (3f)	Loughrea; Referee: S Moran

27 April	Padraig Pearse's	2-18 - 1-15	Moycullen	Athenry; Referee: M Conway
27 April	Tómas Flannery 0-9 (7f), Cyril Donnelan 1-3, Cormac Ward 1-2, Shane Raftery 0-2 (2f), Darragh Skehill 0-1, Emmet Ward 0-1		Eanna Noone 0-7 (6f), Conor Boham 0-4, Christopher Hurney 1-1, Philip Lydon 0-2, Niall Mannion 0-1	Athenry; Referee: M Conway

5 May	Loughrea	0-18 - 0-14	Craughwell	Athenry; Referee: S Moran
5 May	Johnny Maher 0-8 (6f), Neil Keary 0-4, Jamie Ryan 0-3, Johnny Coen 0-2, Paul Hoban 0-1		Kealan Cullinane 0-10 (9f), Fergal Healy 0-1 (1f), Jamie Ryan 0-1, Michael Coughlan 0-1, Kealan Greene 0-1	Athenry; Referee: S Moran

5 May	Turloughmore	2-17 - 1-10	Carnmore	Athenry; Referee: E Shaughnessy
5 May	Francis Forde 1-2, Ronan Badger 1-1, Gary Burke 0-4, Darren O Shaughnessy 0-3 (2f, 1 sideline), Brian Murphy 0-3 (1f), Matthew Keating 0-2, Brian Holland 0-1, Ashley Hurney 0-1		Barry Hanley 0-7 (6f), Donie Fox 1-2, JP O Connell 0-1	Athenry; Referee: E Shaughnessy

=== Preliminary to Round 2 ===
11 May	Ardrahan	2-22 - 2-12	Moycullen	Athenry; Referee: L Fay
11 May	Maurice Callanan 0-8 (7f), Johnny Glynn 1-3, David Kennedy 0-4 (1 sideline), John Greene 1-0, Joe O Leary 0-3, Stephen Whelan 0-2, Cormac Diviney 0-2		Eanna Noone 0-5 (4f), Christopher Hurney 1-0, Conor Noone 1-0, Philip Lydon 0-3, Conor Bohan 0-1, Niall Mannion 0-1, Robert Molloy 0-1, Vincent Flaherty 0-1	Athenry; Referee: L Fay

=== Round 2 ===
12 May	Kinvara	2-13 - 1-15	Sarsfields	Athenry; Referee: A Kelly
12 May	Conor Kavanagh 0-7 (7f), Conor Whelan 2-0, Tom O Donavan 0-4, David Huban 0-1, Aidan Moylan 0-1		Kerrill Wade 0-8 (7f), Joseph Cooney 1-3, Noel Kelly 0-1, Ian Skehill 0-1, Joseph Burke 0-1, Niall Quinn 0-1	Athenry; Referee: A Kelly

12 May	Craughwell	3-10 - 0-10	Athenry	Loughrea; Referee: P Murphy
12 May	Kealan Cullinane 1-4 (4f), Shane Dolan 1-1, Jamie Ryan 1-0, Michael Coughlan 0-3, Fergal Healy 0-1, Kealan Greene 0-1		Cathal Keane 0-5 (5f), David Donoghue 0-2, Mark Hannon 0-1, Conor Burke 0-1, Philip Twomey 0-1	Loughrea; Referee: P Murphy

12 May	Liam Mellows	1-11 - 0-14	Beagh	Athenry; Referee: S Moran
12 May	Tadhg Haran 0-9 (6f), Adrian Morrissey 1-0, Jack Hastings 0-1, Aonghus Callanan 0-1		Kevin Keehan 0-5 (4f), Joe Gantly 0-4, Paraic Landers 0-2, Adrian Tuohy 0-1, Tommy Mckeown 0-1, Jamie Diviney 0-1	Athenry; Referee: S Moran

11 May	Tommy Larkin's	0-15 - 0-10	Carnmore	Athenry; Referee: M Conway
11 May	Jason Flynn 0-8 (7f), Stephen 0-2, Eamon Hayes 0-2, Kevin Hooban 0-1, Kevin McHugo 0-1		Barry Hanley 0-8 (6f), JP O Connell 0-1, Martin Kelly 0-1	Athenry; Referee: M Conway

19 May	Ardrahan	1-18 - 2-13	Tynagh-Abbey/Duniry	Athenry; Referee: C Browne
19 May	Maurice Callanan 0-6 (5f), Johnny Glynn 0-4, Ger Bond 1-1, David Kennedy 0-2, John Greene 0-2, Stephen Whelan 0-1, Iarla Tannian 0-1, Gerard Forde 0-1		Padraig Brehony 0-5, Micheal Dervan 1-1, Colm Larkin 1-1, Shane Maloney 0-3 (3f), Ger Burke 0-2, Kevin Maloney 0-1	Athenry; Referee: C Browne

18 May; REPLAY	Beagh	1-17 - 3-8	Liam Mellows	Athenry; Referee: M Dolan
18 May; REPLAY	Kevin Keehan 1-7 (1-7f), Paraic Landers 0-4, Joe Gantly 0-2, Adrian Tuohy 0-1, Jamie Diviney 0-1, Thomas Fallon 0-1, Kieran Diviney 0-1		Tadhg Haran 1-5 (4f), Aonghus Callanan 2-2, R Bennis 0-1	Athenry; Referee: M Dolan

==== Group A ====
Pos	Team	Pld	W	D	L	SF	SA	Diff	Pts
1	Portumna	3	2	0	1	3-57	4-35	19	4
2	St. Thomas'	3	2	0	1	6-34	1-39	20	4
3	Clarinbridge	3	1	1	1	2-37	3-43	9	3
4	Killimordaly	3	0	1	2	2-36	6-57	-33	1

Round 1	Portumna	1-16 - 2-11	St. Thomas'	Athenry
Round 1	Joe Canning 0-8 (6f), Damien Hayes 1-2, Ronan O Meara 0-3, Kevin Hayes 0-2, Niall Hayes 0-1		Conor Cooney 1-4 (2f), Gerald Murray 1-0, David Burke 0-2, Anthony Kelly 0-2, Richie Murray 0-2, David Burke 0-2, James Regan 0-1	Athenry

Round 1	Killimordaly	1-13 - 1-13	Clarinbridge	Athenry
Round 1	Eanna Ryan 0-6 (3f), Paul Madden 1-1, Tommy Madden 0-2, Andrew Daly 0-2, Keith Kennedy 0-1, Niall Earls 0-1		Paul Coen 0-7 (7f), Christy Bannon 1-0, Eanna Murphy 0-2, Eoin Forde 0-1, Barry Keane 0-1, Alan Armstrong 0-1, Shane Burke 0-1	Athenry

Round 2	Clarinbridge	1-14 - 0-14	Portumna	Ballinasloe
Round 2	Paul Coen 1-12 (1-11f), Stephen Forde 0-1, Eoin Forde 0-1		Joe Canning 0-10 (9f), Andy Smith 0-1 (1f), Ronan O Meara 0-1, Damien Hayes 0-1, Kevin Hayes 0-1	Ballinasloe

Round 2	St. Thomas'	3-17 - 0-13	Killimordaly	Athenry
Round 2	Conor Cooney 1-7 (3f), Anthony Kelly 1-3, Eanna Burke 1-1, Darragh Burke 0-3 (3f), Gerald Murray 0-1, Richie Murray 0-1, J Barrett 0-1		Niall Earls 0-9 (9f), Tommy Madden 0-2, Eanna Ryan 0-1, David Concannon 0-1	Athenry

Round 3	Portumna	2-27 - 1-10	Killimordaly	Loughrea
Round 3	Joe Canning 0-14 (8f), Andy Smith 1-4, Niall Hayes 1-1, Ronan O Meara 0-3, Oisin Royston 0-2, Damien Hayes 0-1, Kevin Hayes 0-1, C Barry 0-1		Niall Earls 0-4 (4f), Eanna Ryan 0-3, Nigel Daly 1-0 (1-0f), Tommy Madden 0-1, Brian Burke 0-1, Andrew Daly 0-1	Loughrea

Round 3	St. Thomas'	2-16 - 0-10	Clarinbridge	Athenry
Round 3	Conor Cooney 1-7 (1-3f), Darragh Burke 1-0 (1-0f), Richie Murray 0-2, David Burke 0-2, Bernard Burke 0-2, James Regan 0-1, Anthony Kelly 0-1, Shane Cooney 0-1,		Eoin Forde 0-6 (6f), Barry Keane 0-2, Eanna Murphy 0-1, Sean Kilduff 0-1	Athenry

==== Group B ====
Pos	Team	Pld	W	D	L	SF	SA	Diff	Pts
1	Turloughmore	3	2	1	0	5-55	3-48	13	5
2	Ardrahan	3	2	0	1	4-48	4-49	-1	4
3	Gort	3	1	1	1	4-51	5-39	8	3
4	Mullagh	3	0	0	3	2-48	3-67	-22	0

Round 1	Ardrahan	0-23 - 0-19	Mullagh	Loughrea
Round 1	Maurice Callanan 0-14 (8f), Johnny Glynn 0-2, Richard Mullins 0-2, Brian Murtagh 0-2, David Kennedy 0-2, Joe O Leary 0-1		Cathal Dervan 0-8 (7f), Davy Glennon 0-5, Stephen Cahalan 0-2, Cathal Kennedy 0-2, Niall Cahalan 0-1, Finian Coone 0-1	Loughrea

Round 1	Tulroughmore	1-16 - 1-16	Gort	Loughrea
Round 1	Ronan Badger 0-7 (6f), Cian Burke 1-0, Gary Burke 0-2, Brian Murphy 0-2, Fergal Moore 0-1, Brian Holland 0-1, Darren O Shaughnessy 0-1, Conor Shaughnessy 0-1		Gerry Quinn 0-10 (10f), Paul Killilea 1-1, Richie Cummins 0-4, Greg Lally 0-1	Loughrea

Round 2	Ardrahan	2-10 - 2-9	Gort	Loughrea
Round 2	Johnny Glynn 1-3 (1f), Maurice Callanan 0-5 (4f), Brian Murtagh 1-0, David Kennedy 0-1, Jason Kennedy 0-1		Richie Cummins 2-2, Gerry Quinn 0-5 (5f), Aidan Harte 0-1, Greg Lally 0-1	Loughrea

Round 2	Turloughmore	2-18 - 0-17	Mullagh	Athenry
Round 2	Gary Burke 1-4, Conor Shaughnessy 0-5 (4f), Ronan Badger 1-2, Brian Murphy 0-3, Sean Linnane 0-2, Francis Forde 0-1, Cian Burke 0-1		Cathal Dervan 0-6 (5f), Davy Glennon 0-3, Finian Coone 0-2 (1f), Kevin Briscoe 0-1, Stephen Cahalan 0-1, Cathal Kennedy 0-1, Donal Reilly 0-1, Ciaran Rafferty 0-1, Derek Hardiman 0-1	Athenry

Round 3	Turloughmore	2-21 - 2-15	Ardrahan	Athenry
Round 3	Ronan Bader 2-3, Conor Shaughnessy 0-7 (4f), Gary Burke 0-4, Francis Forde 0-2, Sean Linnane 0-2, Darren O Shaughnessy 0-1, Matthew Keating 0-1, Cian Burke 0-1		Maurice Callanan 2-9 (1-9f), Conor Tannian 0-2, Brian Murtagh 0-2, Ger Bond 0-1, Stephen Whelan 0-1	Athenry

Round 3	Gort	1-26 - 2-12	Mullagh	Loughrea
Round 3	Gerry Quinn 0-7 (6f), Aidan Harte 0-6, Sean Forde 1-1, Michael Mullins 0-2, Martin Nestor 0-2, Richie Cummins 0-2, Jason Grealish 0-2 (1f), Albert Mullins 0-2, Greg Lally 0-1, Aiden Helebert 0-1		Cathal Dervan 0-8 (7f), Ciaran Rafferty 2-1, Derek Hardiman 0-2, Cathal Kennedy 0-1	Loughrea

==== Group C ====
Pos	Team	Pld	W	D	L	SF	SA	Diff	Pts
1	Loughrea	3	2	0	1	3-46	2-39	10	5
2	Castlegar	3	2	0	1	4-47	5-40	5	5
3	Kinvara	3	1	2	0	3-44	3-46	-2	2
4	Craughwell	3	0	0	3	3-39	3-51	-12	0

Round 1	Loughrea	0-17 - 0-13	Kinvara	Gort
Round 1	Johnny Maher 0-6 (4f), Johnny Coen 0-3, Neil Keary 0-3, Sean Sweeney 0-3 (2f), Gavin Keary 0-1, Paul Hoban 0-1		Conor Kavanagh 0-6 (5f), David Huban 0-3 (1f, 1sl), Tom O Donavan 0-2, Conor Whelan 0-1, Colm Burke 0-1	Gort

Round 1	Castlegar	1-17 - 1-14	Craughwell	Athenry
Round 1	Ger Farragher 0-7 (5f, 1sl), Dean Higgins 1-1, Donal Mcgreal 0-2, Enda Concannon 0-2, Ronan O Flynn 0-2, Jason O Gorman 0-1, Tomas Mannion 0-1, Kevin Brady 0-1		Niall Healy 0-8 (5f), Michael Coughlan 1-2, Fergal Healy 0-2, Dermot Ryan 0-1, Mark Horan 0-1	Athenry

Round 2	Kinvara	1-18 - 2-12	Craughwell	Athenry
Round 2	Conor Kavanagh 1-8 (6f), Conor Whelan 0-6, Alan Leech 0-2, Stephen Moylan 0-1, Colm Callanan 0-1 (1f)		Niall Healy 1-7 (7f), Mark Horan 1-1, Michael Coughlan 0-1, Fergal Healy 0-1, Dermot Ryan 0-1, Cathal Greaney 0-1	Athenry

Round 2	Loughrea	2-13 - 2-13	Castlegar	Athenry
Round 2	Neil Keary 1-5 (1sl), Johnny Maher 0-5 (5f), Jamie Ryan 1-0, Johnny Coen 0-2, Brian Mahony 0-1		Ger Farragher 0-8 (5f, 1sl), Enda Concannon 1-2, Dean Higgins 1-1, Sean Connolly 0-1, Kevin Brady 0-1	Athenry

Round 3	Casltegar	1-17 - 2-13	Kinvara	Athenry
Round 3	Ger Farragher 0-7 (5f), Enda Concannon 1-0, Ronan O Flynn 0-3, Kevin Brady 0-2, Dean Higgins 0-1, Sean Connolly 0-1, David O Gorman 0-1, Kevin Keane 0-1		Conor Whelan 1-4, Conor Kavanagh 0-6 (3f), Colm Callanan 1-0 (1-0f), David Huban 0-1 (1sl), Tom O Donavan 0-1, Alan Leech 0-1,	Athenry

Round 3	Loughrea	1-16 - 0-13	Craughwell	Gort
Round 3	Johnny Maher 0-4 (1f), Paul Hoban 0-4, Johnny O Loughlin 1-0, Johnny Coen 0-3, Jamie Ryan 0-2, Sean Sweeney 0-1 (1f), Neil Keary 0-1, Gavin Keary 0-1		Niall Healy 0-9 (4f), Shane Dolan 0-1, Cathal Greaney 0-1, Mark Horan 0-1, Brian Dolan 0-1	Gort

==== Group D ====
Pos	Team	Pld	W	D	L	SF	SA	Diff	Pts
1	Padraig Pearse's	3	3	0	1	3-42	0-38	13	6
2	Beagh	3	2	0	0	1-48	2-39	6	4
3	Kiltormer	3	1	2	0	1-45	1-45	0	2
4	Tommy Larkin's	3	0	0	3	1-36	3-49	-19	0

Round 1	Padraig Pearse's	0-16 - 0-13	Kiltormer
Round 1	Thomas Flannery 0-7 (7f), Shane Raftery 0-2 (2f), Cormac Ward 0-2, Cyril Donnelan 0-1, Colm Raftery 0-1, Ronan Bellew 0-1, Darragh Skehill 0-1, Emmet Ward 0-1		Keith Kilkenny 0-7 (7f), Conor Ryan 0-2, David Hayes 0-2, Brendan Kenny 0-1, Michael Dolan 0-1

Round 1	Beagh	1-17 - 0-13	Tommy Larkin's
Round 1	Joe Gantly 0-5, Kevin Keehan 0-5 (4f), Kieran Diviney 1-2, Rory Gantly 0-2 (1f), Adrian Tuohy 0-2, Damien Landers 0-1		Jason Flynn 0-6 (5f), Niall Kelly 0-2, Kevin McHugo 0-1, Stephen Page 0-1, Kevin Hooban 0-1, David Hickey 0-1, Daragh Kelly 0-1

Round 2	Padraig Pearse's	2-11 - 0-14	Beagh	Athenry
Round 2	Tomas Flannery 0-4 (3f), Cyril Donnelan 0-4, Fergal Flannery 1-0 (1-0pen), Gary Lally 1-0, Cormac Ward 0-1, Colm Raferty 0-1, Ronan Bellew 0-1		Kevin Keehan 0-5 (5f), Adrian Tuohy 0-2, Paraic Landers 0-2, Joe Gantly 0-2, Adrian Diviney 0-1, Jamie Diviney 0-1, Thomas Fallon 0-1	Athenry

Round 2	Kiltormer	1-17 - 1-12	Tommy Larkin's	Ballinasloe
Round 2	Keith Kilkenny 0-7 (6f), Sean Claffey 1-1, Brendan Kenny 0-2, Conor Ryan 0-1, David Hayes 0-1, Darren Hopkins 0-1, Michael Dolan 0-1, Patrick Cormican 0-1, Micheal Greaney 0-1		Kevin Hooban 1-1, Jason Flynn 0-3 (3f), Eamon Hayes 0-3, Stephen Page 0-2, Kevin McHugo 0-1, Conor Nevin 0-1, Damien Broderick 0-1	Ballinasloe

Round 3	Padraig Pearse's	1-15 - 0-11	Tommy Larkin's	Loughrea
Round 3	Thomas Flannery 0-11 (7f), Emmet Ward 1-0, Colm Raferty 0-1, Cormac Ward 0-1, Sean Hardiman 0-1, Robbie Donnelan 0-1		Jason Flynn 0-9 (6f), Stephen Page 0-1, Niall Kelly 0-1	Loughrea

Round 3	Beagh	0-17 - 0-15	Kiltormer	Athenry
Round 3	Kevin Keehan 0-10 (9f), Joe Gantly 0-4, Johnathan Morris 0-1, Enda Tuohy 0-1, Kieran Diviney 0-1		Keith Kilkenny 0-6 (6f), Patrick Cormican 0-3, David Hayes 0-2 (1f), Michael Dolan 0-1, Sean Claffey 0-1, Darren Hopkins 0-1, Conor Ryan 0-1	Athenry

=== Relegation play-offs ===
==== Group 1 ====
Round 1	Athenry	1-18 - 1-18	Liam Mellows	Loughrea
Round 1	Cathal Keane 1-9 (7f), Darragh Glynn 1-3, Tom Flynn 0-2, Conor Burke 0-1, Mark Hannon 0-1, Jack Carr 0-1, Philip Twomey 0-1		Tadhg Haran 0-13 (7f), Aonghus Callanan 0-3, David Collins 1-0, Conor Hynes 0-1, David Fahy 0-1	Loughrea

Round 2	Liam Mellows	5-16 - 0-12	Moycullen	Pearse Stadium
Round 2	Adrian Morrissey 1-6 (5f), Aonghus Callanan 2-1, David Collins 1-3, Niall Mcinerney 1-0, John Lee 0-3, John Hughes 0-1 (1f), J O Halloran 0-1, Jack Hastings 0-1		Eanna Noone 0-7 (5f, 1sl), Vincent Flaherty 0-2, Conor Noone 0-1, Christopher Hurney 0-1, Philip Lydon 0-1	Pearse Stadium

Round 3	Athenry	4-11 - 2-13	Moycullen	Pearse Stadium
Round 3	David Donoghue 2-4, Cathal Keane 1-1, Tom Flynn 1-1, Conor Cannon 0-3, Paddy Hannon 0-1, Jack Carr 0-1		Eanna Noone 1-7, Conor Bohan 1-3, Christopher Hurney 0-1, Niall Mannion 0-1, Eanna Malone 0-1	Pearse Stadium

==== Group 2 ====
Round 1	Sarsfields	1-13 - 1-9	Moycullen	Ballinasloe
Round 1	Kerrill Wade 0-5 (4f), Joseph Cooney 0-4, Noel Kelly 1-1, Niall Morrissey 0-2, Ian Skehill 0-1		Shane Maloney 0-4 (4f), Padraig Brehony 0-3, Kevin Broderick 1-0, Paul Gordon 0-1, B Cunningham 0-1	Ballinasloe

Round 2	Tynagh-Abbey/Duniry	1-19 - 0-13	Carnmore	Loughrea
Round 2	Shane Maloney 0-6, Padraig Brehony 1-3, Ronan Madden 0-4, Colm Larkin 0-2, B Cunningham 0-1, Paul Killeen 0-1, Kevin Maloney 0-1, Ger Burke 0-1		Barry Hanley 0-8, JP O Connell 0-3, George Hanley 0-1, Anthony Daveron 0-1	Loughrea

Round 3	Sarsfields	0-12 - 0-12	Carnmore	Loughrea
Round 3	Kerrill Wade 0-4, Niall Morrissey 0-2, Ian Skehill 0-1, Joseph Cooney 0-1, Noel Kelly 0-1, Kevin Hynes 0-1, Sean Kelly 0-1, Niall Quinn 0-1		Barry Hanley 0-9 (5f), Kevin Killilea 0-3	Loughrea

22 September Semi-final	Tynagh-Abbey/Duniry	1-27 - 1-10	Moycullen	Craughwell
				Referee: M Conway

22 September Semi-final	Athenry	0-15 - 0-11	Carnmore	Ballinderreen
				Referee: P Sheehan

20 October Relegation final	Carnmore	1-15 - 1-13	Moycullen	Kenny Park
		Report

=== Quarter-finals ===
14 September Quarter-final	Beagh	2-12 - 1-13	Turloughmore	Kenny Park
	K Keehan (1-5, 0-4f), P Landers (1-2), J Gantley (0-2), A Touhey (0-2), R Gantley (0-1f).	Report	C Shaughnessy (0-6, 4f), F Forde (1-0), S Linnane (0-3), D O’Shaughnessy (0-2), G Burke (0-1), B Murphy (0-1).	Referee: C Browne

22 September Quarter-final	St. Thomas's	2-19 - 0-21	Castlegar	Kenny Park
		Report

22 September Quarter-final	Portumna	1-15 - 1-14	Ardrahan	Loughrea
	J Canning (0-7, 4f), R O’Meara (1-0), A Smith (0-3, 2f), O Canning (0-2), D Hayes (0-1), N Hayes (0-1), O Royston (0-1).	Report	M Callanan (0-9, 7f, 1’65), B Murtagh (1-0), J Kennedy (0-3), C Diviney (0-1), D Kennedy (0-1).	Referee: J Keane

22 September Quarter-final	Loughrea	0-14 - 1-10	Pádraig Pearses
		Report

=== Semi-finals ===
6 October Semi-final	Loughrea	2-18 - 1-11	Beagh
	N Keary (0-9, 4f, 1’65), J Coen (1-2), J O’Loughlin (1-2), J Maher (0-2), B Mahony (0-1), S Sweeney (0-1), P Hoban (0-1).	Report	K Keehan (1-6fs), A Tuohey (0-2), J Divney (0-1), P Divney (0-1), PJ McAllen (0-1).	Referee: J Keane

6 October Semi-final	Portumna	0-22 - 1-19	St. Thomas's
	J Canning (0-13, 8f), D Hayes (0-5), R O’Meara (0-2), O Canning (0-1), A Smith (0-1).	Report	C Cooney (0-11, 8f), Richie Murray (1-0), E Burke (0-3), A Kelly (0-2), Darragh Burke (0-1), David Burke (0-1), B Burke (0-1).	Referee: A Kelly

13 October Semi-final replay	Portumna	0-18 - 2-11	St. Thomas's	Athenry
	J Canning (0-10, 9f, 1’65), D Hayes (0-3), R O’Meara (0-2), L Smith (0-1), K Hayes (0-1), N Hayes (0-1).	Report	C Cooney (2-6f), David Burke (0-2), J Regan (0-2), K Burke (0-1).	Referee: L Fay

=== Final ===
28 October Final	Portumna	3-12 - 0-14	Loughrea	Pearse Stadium
	A Smith 1-5, J Canning 1-5 (1-3f), D Hayes 1-1, O Canning 0-1.	Report	N Keary 0-5 (4f), J O’Loughlin, J Ryan & J Coen (0-1pen) 0-2 each, G Keary, P Hoban & J Maher 0-1 each.	Referee: J Keane (Rahoon)
