= Greg Kennedy (hurler) =

Irish hurler

Personal information
- Native name: Gréagóir Ó Cinnéide (Irish)
- Born: 15 April 1976 (age 50) Loughrea, County Galway, Ireland
- Height: 5 ft 10 in (178 cm)

Sport
- Sport: Hurling
- Position: Right Corner back
Club
- Years: Club
- Loughrea
Club titles
- Galway titles: 1
- Connacht titles: 1
Inter-county
- Years: County
- 1996-2007: Galway
Inter-county titles
- Connacht titles: 4
- All-Irelands: 0
- NHL: 0
- All Stars: 0

Greg Kennedy (born 15 April 1976) is an Irish hurler who played as a left corner-back for the Galway senior team.

Kennedy joined the team during the 1996 championship and subsequently became a regular member of the starting fifteen until his retirement after the 2007 championship. During that time he won four consecutive Connacht medals.

At club level Kennedy is a one-time Connacht medalist with Loughrea. He has also won one county club championship medal.

On 11 May 2019, Kennedy was part of the Dublin back-room team for the 2019 Leinster Senior Hurling Championship match against Kilkenny. He was on the field as a runner in the first half when he intercepted a quickly-taken TJ Reid free by catching the ball and throwing it back to Reid. He was handed a proposed four-week ban for his actions.

Sporting positions
| Preceded by Darragh Coen | Galway minor hurling team captain 1994 | Succeeded by Vinnie Maher |
Achievements
| Preceded by Shane Doyle | All-Ireland Minor Hurling Final winning captain 1994 | Succeeded by Brian O'Keeffe |
