= Loughrea GAA =

Gaelic sports club in County Galway, Ireland

Loughrea
- Baile Locha Riach
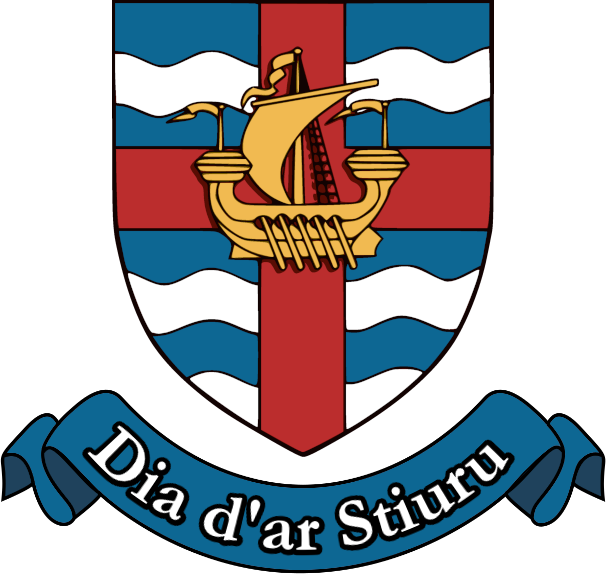
- Founded: 1884
- County: Galway
- Nickname: The Town
- Colours
- Grounds: St Brendan's Park
- Coordinates: 53°12′11″N 8°33′07″W

Playing kits
Standard colours

Senior Club Championships
	All Ireland	Connacht champions	Galway champions
Hurling:	0	1	5

Loughrea GAA is a Gaelic Athletic Association club in Loughrea, County Galway, Ireland. The club is affiliated to the Galway County Board and is exclusively concerned with the game of hurling.

== History ==
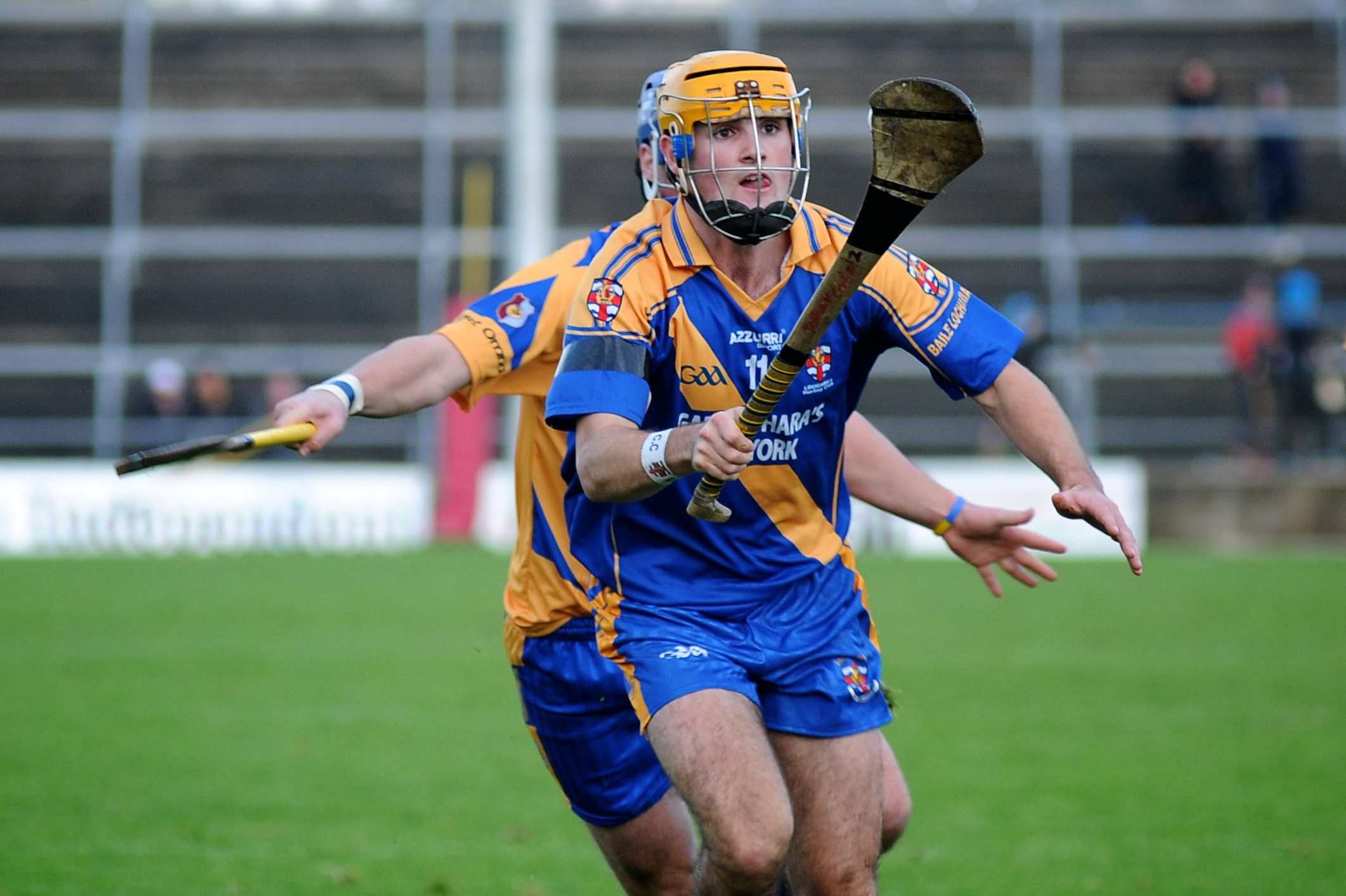
Johnny Coen playing for Loughrea, 2013.

Located in the town of Loughrea, about 25 miles to the east of Galway city, Loughrea GAA Club was established in 1884. The club was 25 years old when it qualified for its first Galway SHC final, however, Craughwell were awarded the title at the expense of Loughrea.

Loughrea finally made a breakthrough when, in 1941, the club won the Galway SHC title for the first time in their history, following a defeat of the Army side. The club added several Galway MHC titles to their roll of honour on a number of occasions, however, it was 1981 before Loughrea had their next adult success when they won the Galway IHC title.

In 2006, Loughrea claimed their second Galway SHC title with a defeat of reigning champions Portumna. The club later added the Connacht Club SHC to their collection, before being beaten by Ballyhale Shamrocks in the 2007 All-Ireland Club SHC final. There were also a number of defeats during this period, with Loughrea losing seven Galway SHC finals between 2003 and 2022. This losing streak was brought to an end when Loughrea won consecutive Galway SHC titles in 2024 and 2025.

On 18 January 2026, Loughrea played Ballygunner in the 2026 All-Ireland Senior Club Hurling final at Croke Park. They lost the final by 1-20 to 1-14.

On 1 November 2026, Loughrea defeated Tommy Larkin's by 0-17 to 0-16 in the 2026 Galway Senior Hurling Championship final to make it three Galway Senior Hurling Championship titles in a row.

== Achievements ==
- Connacht Senior Club Hurling Championship (1) 2006
- Galway Senior Hurling Championship (5): 1941, 2006, 2024, 2025, 2026
- Galway Intermediate Hurling Championship (1): 1981
- Galway Junior A Hurling Championship (2): 2009, 2012
- Galway Minor Hurling Championship (6) 1942, 1950, 1953, 1971, 1979, 2009

== Notable players ==
- Johnny Coen: All-Ireland SHC-winner (2017)
- Paul Hoban: Leinster SHC-winner (2012)
- Greg Kennedy: All-Ireland MHC-winning captain (1994)
