= 2024 Galway Senior Hurling Championship =

Annual hurling competition season

2024 Galway Senior Hurling Championship winner Cian Corcoran of Castleknock
Tournament details
- County: Galway
- Year: 2024
- Sponsor: Brooks

Winners
- Champions: Loughrea (3rd win)
- Manager: Tommy Kelly
- Captain: Ian Hanrahan

Promotion/Relegation
- Promoted team(s): Athenry to Senior A Tynagh-Abbey/Duniry to Senior B
- Relegated team(s): Mullagh to Senior B Beagh to Intermediate

The 2024 Galway Senior Hurling Championship was the 127th staging of the Galway Senior Hurling Championship since its establishment in 1887. The competition was sponsored by Brooks for their fifth year of a partnership that started in 2020.

== Competition format ==
Twenty four teams competed; 16 in Senior A and 8 in Senior B. The teams in Senior A play for the championship. The teams in Senior B play for promotion to Senior A in 2025 at the expense of the relegated Senior A team. A team was also relegated from Senior B to play in the 2025 Intermediate Championship.

The draw for the group stages was performed on 24 June.

== Senior A ==
=== Group stage ===
Senior A consists of 16 teams divided into four groups of 4 teams.

- The top teams in each group progress directly to the Quarter-Finals
- The 2nd and 3rd placed teams qualify for the Preliminary Quarter-Finals
- The bottom teams compete in a play off with the loser relegated to Senior B for 2025

==== Senior A – Group 1 ====
Pos	Team	Pld	W	D	L	SF	SA	Diff	Pts
1	Turloughmore	3	3	0	0	5-85	0-47	+53	6
2	Cappataggle	3	2	0	1	1-53	4-56	-12	4
3	Kilconieron	3	1	0	2	2-41	2-55	-14	2
4	Mullagh	3	0	0	3	3-47	5-68	-27	0

10 August 2024; Round 1	Cappataggle	0-16 - 1-10	Kilconieron	Duggan Park; Referee: Noel Quinn
10 August 2024; Round 1	Niall Collins (0-5, 0-4 frees); Oran Finn (0-3); Michael Garvey (0-2 frees); Cian Bowes (0- 2); Donnacha Campbell, Liam Collins, Jack Coughlan, Donal Mannion (0-1)		Sean Connaughton (0-8, 0-6 frees, 0-1 '65); Jack Walsh (1-0); Oscar O'Gorman, Keith Burke (0- 1)	Duggan Park; Referee: Noel Quinn

10 August 2024; Round 1	Turloughmore	3-31 - 0-16	Mullagh	Loughrea; Referee: Brian Keon
10 August 2024; Round 1	Sean Loftus (1-6); Conor Walsh (0-8, 0-7 frees); Dara Whelan (1-3); Вarry Callanan (1-2); Sean O'Hanlon (0-4); Tom Quirke (0-3); Sean Linnane (0-2); Cillian Trayers, Сillian Whelan, Matthew Tarpey (0-1)		C Dolphin (0-8, 0-5 frees); Davy Glennon (0-3); S Hardiman, Ronan Glennon, S Callanan, F Coone, S Cahalan (0-1)	Loughrea; Referee: Brian Keon

24 August 2024; 16:15; Round 2	Turloughmore	1-29 - 0-15	Cappataggle	Kenny Park, Athenry; Referee: Conor Quinlan
24 August 2024; 16:15; Round 2	Conor Walsh (0-11, 0-7 frees); Sean Loftus (0-9, 0-2 frees); Dara Whelan (1-1); Cillian Whelan, Sean Linnane, Sean O'Hanlon (0-2); Tom Quirke, Jamie Holland (0-1)		Niall Collins (0-6, 0-3 frees); Micheal Garvey (0-2, 0-1 frees, 0-1 '65); Jarlath Mannion (0-2); Declan Cronin, Donnacha Campbell, Oisin Finn, Oran Finn, Cian Bowes (0-1)	Kenny Park, Athenry; Referee: Conor Quinlan

25 August 2024; 15:15; Round 2	Kilconieron	1-15 - 1-14	Mullagh	Duggan Park; Referee: Sean Byrne
25 August 2024; 15:15; Round 2	Sean Connaughton (1-8, 0-5 frees); Keith Burke (0-4, 0-2 frees); Paddy Regan, Brian Hickey, Jack Walsh (0-1)		Conor Dolphin (1-11, 0-8 frees); Sean Callanan (0-2); Cathal Kennedy (0-1)	Duggan Park; Referee: Sean Byrne

7 September 2024; 15:15; Round 3	Cappataggle	1-22 - 2-17	Mullagh	Duggan Park; Referee: Shane Hynes
7 September 2024; 15:15; Round 3	Niall Collins (0-14, 0-8 frees); Jack Coughlan (1-1); Michael Garvey (0-2, 0-1 free); Jarlath Mannion (0-2); Eanna Garvey, Oran Finn, Donal Mannion (0-1)		Conor Dolphin (1-11, 0-9 frees); Davy Glennon (0-3); Sean Callanan (1-0); Finnian Coone (0-2); Damien Monaghan (0-1)	Duggan Park; Referee: Shane Hynes

7 September 2024; 15:15; Round 3	Turloughmore	1-25 - 0-16	Kilconieron	Pearse Stadium; Referee: David Earls
7 September 2024; 15:15; Round 3	Conor Walsh (0-10, 0-6 frees); Sean Linnane (1-2); Barry Callanan (0-3); Daithi Burke, Matthew Tarpey, Sean O'Hanlon, Cillian Whelan (0-2); Daniel Loftus, Brendan Phelan (0-1)		Sean Connaughton (0-6, 0-3 frees); Brian Hickey (0-3); Colin Curley, Keith Burke (0-2 frees); Shane Murray, Daniel Keane, Shane Caulfield (0-1)	Pearse Stadium; Referee: David Earls

==== Senior A – Group 2 ====
Pos	Team	Pld	W	D	L	SF	SA	Diff	Pts
1	Loughrea	3	3	0	0	6-64	3-54	+19	6
2	Clarinbridge	3	2	0	1	5-62	3-47	+21	4
3	Craughwell	3	1	0	2	1-58	5-62	-16	2
4	Moycullen	3	0	0	3	2-49	3-70	-24	0

9 August 2024; Round 1	Loughrea	2-22 - 1-19	Craughwell	Kenny Park, Athenry; Referee: Derek Kelly
9 August 2024; Round 1	Anthony Burns (1-6); Tiernan Killeen (0-4, 0-1 free); Bobby Feeney (1-1); Shane Morgan (0-3, 0-2 frees, 0-1 '65); Joe Mooney (0-2); Ian Hanrahan, Shane O'Brien, Caimin Killeen, Tom Hoban, Darren Shaughnessy (0-1); Neil Keary (0-1 free)		Thomas Monaghan (0-6, 0-1 free); Patrick Monaghan (1-2); Adrian Prendergast (0-4, 0-3 frees); Conor Gilligan, Dean Callanan (0-2); Ryan Howley, Adam Clarke, Jamie Ryan (0-1)	Kenny Park, Athenry; Referee: Derek Kelly

9 August 2024; Round 1	Clarinbridge	2-21 - 0-15	Moycullen	Pearse Stadium; Referee: Conor Quinlan
9 August 2024; Round 1	Evan Niland (1-15, 1-9 frees, 0-3 '65s); Gavin Lee (0-3); Dylan Dunne, Liam Leen, Mark Kennedy, Joshua Ryan (1-0)		Diarmuid Davoren (0-9, 0-6 frees, 0-1 sideline cut); Fionn Mac Donnacha (0-3); Daire Davoren, Niall Mannion, Colm Cunningham (0-1)	Pearse Stadium; Referee: Conor Quinlan

23 August 2024; 18:30; Round 2	Clarinbridge	2-23 - 0-14	Craughwell	Kenny Park, Athenry; Referee: Liam Gordon
23 August 2024; 18:30; Round 2	Evan Niland (0-14, 0-12 frees); David Lee, Joshua Ryan (1-0); Aaron Niland (0-3); Dylan Dunne, Conor Lee, Cian Donoghue, Gavin Lee, Mark Kennedy, Sean Kilduff (0-1)		Thomas Monaghan (0-4, 0-1 free); Oisin Quirke (0-3, 0-2 frees, 0-1 '65); Dean Callanan (0-2); Patrick Monaghan (0-1 free); Adam Clarke, Conor Gilligan, Darragh McCartin, Shaun Gilligan (0-1)	Kenny Park, Athenry; Referee: Liam Gordon

25 August 2024; 12:00; Round 2	Loughrea	1-24 - 1-17	Moycullen	Pearse Stadium; Referee: David Earls
25 August 2024; 12:00; Round 2	Tiernan Killeen (1-7, 0-3 frees); Shane Morgan (0-5, 0-4 frees, 0-1 '65); Neil Keary (0-4); Anthony Burns (0-3); Kieran Hanrahan, Ian Hanrahan, Shane O'Brien, Tom Hoban, Darren Shaughnessy (0-1)		Diarmuid Davoren (0-11, 0-10 frees); Eanna Noone (1-1, 1-0 penalty); Fionn Mac Donnacha (0-3); Niall Fitzgerald, Colm Cunningham (0-1)	Pearse Stadium; Referee: David Earls

7 September 2024; 15:15; Round 3	Craughwell	0-25 - 1-15	Moycullen	Kenny Park, Athenry; Referee: Noel Quinn
7 September 2024; 15:15; Round 3	Oisin Quirke (0-6 frees); Conor Gilligan (0-4); Thomas Monaghan, Patrick Monaghan (0-3); Stephen Hynes, Dean Callanan, Jamie Ryan (0-2); Stephen O'Halloran, Tirenan Leen, Adrian Prendergast (0-1)		Diarmuid Davoren (0-10, 0-9 frees, 0-1 '65); Fionn Mac Donnacha (0-4); Eanna Noone (1-0 free), Colm Cunningham (0-2); Cian Folan (0-1)	Kenny Park, Athenry; Referee: Noel Quinn

8 September 2024; 17:00; Round 3	Loughrea	3-18 - 1-18	Clarinbridge	Kenny Park, Athenry; Referee: John Keane
8 September 2024; 17:00; Round 3	Tiernan Killeen (1-7, 0-6 frees); Darren Shaughnessy (1-2); Neil Keary (1-0); Shane Morgan (0-2 frees), Joe Mooney (0-2, 0-1 sideline); Ian Hanrahan (0-2); Camin Killeen, Anthony Burns, Bobby Feeney (0-1)		Evan Niland (1-11, 1-0 penalty, 0-10 frees, 0-1 '65); Cian Donoghue, Liam Leen, Joshua Ryan (0-2); Dylan Dunne (0-1)	Kenny Park, Athenry; Referee: John Keane

==== Senior A – Group 3 ====
Pos	Team	Pld	W	D	L	SF	SA	Diff	Pts
1	Tommy Larkin's	3	3	0	0	4-73	4-52	+21	6
2	St Thomas'	3	1	1	1	3-55	2-57	+1	3
3	Killimordaly	3	1	0	2	2-55	6-60	-17	2
4	Gort	3	0	1	2	5-53	2-67	-5	1

9 August 2024; Round 1	Tommy Larkin's	1-24 - 3-15	Gort	Kilbeacanty; Referee: John Keane
9 August 2024; Round 1	Jason Flynn (0-6, 0-5 frees); Cian Duggan (0-4); Conor Gardiner (1-1); Conor Slattery (0-3); Cian Daniels, Adrian Moran, Ronan Murphy, David Hickey (0-2); Eanna Murphy (0-1 free); Conor Hanley (0-1)	Report	Aiden Helebert (1-8, 1-0 penalty, 0-6 frees), Richie Cummins (1-2); Lorcan Walsh, Greg Lally, Jack Linnane (0-2); Michael Mullins (1-0); Jason Grealish (0-1)	Kilbeacanty; Referee: John Keane

10 August 2024; Round 1	St Thomas'	2-18 - 1-12	Killimordaly	Kenny Park, Athenry; Referee: Sean Byrne
10 August 2024; Round 1	Eanna Burke (1-6); Darragh Burke (0-9, 0-7 frees); Victor Manso (1-1); David Burke (0-2)	Report	Brian Concannon (0-14); Darren Daly (0-7, 0-5 frees, 0-2 '65s); Paul Creaven (1-0); Gary McDonagh (0-1)	Kenny Park, Athenry; Referee: Sean Byrne

23 August 2024; 19:00; Round 2	Killimordaly	0-25 - 2-17	Gort	Duggan Park; Referee: Brian Keon
23 August 2024; 19:00; Round 2	Darren Daly (0-11, 0-6 frees, 0-1 '65); Paul Creaven (0-4, 0-1 free); Eanna Ryan (0-3); David Concannon, Brian Concannon (0-2); Adam Brett, Jack Fitzpatrick, Shane Monaghan (0-1)		Aiden Helebert (1-7, 0-4 frees); Richie Cummins (1-1); Greg Lally (0-3); Lorcan Walsh (0-2); Ben O'Donovan, Nathan Gill, Jack Linnane, Michael Mullins (0-1)	Duggan Park; Referee: Brian Keon

25 August 2024; 17:00; Round 2	Tommy Larkin's	1-24 - 0-19	St Thomas'	Duggan Park; Referee: Karol Collins
25 August 2024; 17:00; Round 2	Jason Flynn (0-7, 0-5 frees); Ronan Murphy (1-5); Conor Gardiner (0-3); Eanna Murphy (0-2, 0-1 free); Cian Duggan (0-2); Cian Daniels, Conor Hanley, Colm Flynn, Conor Slattery, David Hickey (0-1)		Conor Cooney (0-10, 0-9 frees); Eanna Burke (0-4); Darragh Burke (0-2); Evan Duggan, David Burke, Oisin Flannery (0-1)	Duggan Park; Referee: Karol Collins

8 September 2024; 15:15; Round 3	Gort	0-21 - 1-18	St Thomas'	Kenny Park, Athenry; Referee: Liam Gordon
8 September 2024; 15:15; Round 3	Aiden Helebert (0-16, 0-12 frees, 0-1 '65); Greg Lally (0-2); Jason Grealish, Nathan Gill, Richie Cummins (0-1)		Conor Cooney (0-10, 0-8 frees); Damian McGlynn (1-0); Eanna Burke, Darragh Burke (0-2); Gerald Kelly (0-1 free); David Burke, Evan Brady, Oisin Flannery (0-1)	Kenny Park, Athenry; Referee: Liam Gordon

8 September 2024; 15:15; Round 3	Tommy Larkin's	2-25 - 1-18	Killimordaly	Duggan Park
8 September 2024; 15:15; Round 3	Jason Flynn (2-11, 0-8 frees, 0-2 sidelines); Ronan Murphy (0-3); Kevin McHugo, Adrian Moran, Conor Gardiner, David Hickey (0-2); Cathal Tuohy, Conor Flynn, Ben Porter (0-1)		Darren Daly (0-8, 0-4 frees); Brian Concannon (1-2); Paul Creaven, Shane Monaghan (0-2); Aaron McDonagh, Adam Brett, David Concannon, Gary McDonagh (0-1)	Duggan Park

==== Senior A – Group 4 ====
Pos	Team	Pld	W	D	L	SF	SA	Diff	Pts
1	Sarsfields	3	3	0	0	1-61	2-47	+11	6
2	Castlegar	3	1	0	2	3-59	3-57	+2	2
3	Ardrahan	3	1	0	2	1-55	0-60	-12	2
4	Oranmore-Maree	3	1	0	2	3-53	3-64	-11	2

10 August 2024; Round 1	Castlegar	2-30 - 2-14	Oranmore-Maree	Pearse Stadium; Referee: Conor Quinlan
10 August 2024; Round 1	Ger Farragher (0- 9, 0-3 '65s, 0-2 frees, 0-1 sideline); Greg Thomas (0-9, 0-3 frees); Oisin Connolly (1-3); Jack Coyne (0-3); Donal Barry (1-0); Darragh Neary (0-2); Sean Neary, Daniel McNulty, Enda Concannon, Dylan Carroll (0-1)		Niall Burke (0-5, 0-3 frees); Gearoid McInerney (1-0 penalty); Conor Hanniffy (0-3); Eoghan Geraghty (1-0); Jack Grealish (0-1 free); Patrick Burke, Anthony Keady, Ruben Davitt, Ryan O'Donnell, Rory Burke (0-1)	Pearse Stadium; Referee: Conor Quinlan

10 August 2024; Round 1	Sarsfields	0-20 - 0-19	Ardrahan	Kenny Park, Athenry; Referee: Liam Gordon
10 August 2024; Round 1	Kevin Cooney (0-7, 5 frees); John Cooney, Michael Hanlon (0-3); Paddy Mac Cartaigh, Alex Connaire (0-2); Leon Connaire, Darragh Donohue, Adam Donohue (0-1)		Donagh Fahy (0-8, 3 frees); Sean Gardiner (0-3); Cathal Walsh (0-2); Jason Kennedy (0-2, 1 frees); Cianan Fahy, Oisin Slevin, Eoin Murphy, Ben O'Connor (0-1)	Kenny Park, Athenry; Referee: Liam Gordon

24 August 2024; 18:00; Round 2	Sarsfields	0-22 - 1-10	Castlegar	Kenny Park, Athenry; Referee: Derek Kelly
24 August 2024; 18:00; Round 2	Kevin Cooney (0-10 frees); Alex Connaire (0-3); Joseph Cooney, Darragh Donohue, Paddy MacCartaigh (0-2); Leon Connaire, Adam Donoghue, Michael Hanlon (0-1)		Greg Thomas (1-4, 0-3 frees); Dean Higgins (0-2); Jack Coyne, Donal Barry, Darragh Neary, Oisin Connolly (0-1)	Kenny Park, Athenry; Referee: Derek Kelly

25 August 2024; 14:15; Round 2	Oranmore-Maree	0-21 - 0-15	Ardrahan	Kenny Park, Athenry; Referee: John Keane
25 August 2024; 14:15; Round 2	Niall Burke (0-10, 0-8 frees); Colm Burke, Patrick Burke, Rory Burke (0-2); Conor Butler, Conor Hanniffy, Anthony Keady, Ryan O'Donnell, Jake Keady (0-1)		Sean Gardiner (0-7, 0-6 frees); Darach Fahy (0-2 frees); Eoin Murphy (0-2); Michael Walsh, Cianan Fahy, Cathal Walsh, Cian Walsh (0-1)	Kenny Park, Athenry; Referee: John Keane

7 September 2024; 17:00; Round 3	Sarsfields	1-19 - 1-18	Oranmore-Maree	Duggan Park; Referee: Sean Byrne
7 September 2024; 17:00; Round 3	Kevin Cooney (0-7, 0-6 frees, 0-1 penalty); Paddy MacCartaigh(0-4); Joseph Cooney (1-1); Adam Donoghue (0-3); Alex Connaire (0-2); Jeffrey Lawless, Michael Hanlon (0-1)		Rory Burke (0-7, 0-5 frees, 0-1 sideline); Diarmuid Hanniffy (1-2); Colm Burke, Jake Keady (0-2); Gearoid McInerney, Patrick Burke, Ryan O'Donnell, Niall Burke, Anthony Keady (0-1)	Duggan Park; Referee: Sean Byrne

7 September 2024; 17:00; Round 3	Ardrahan	1-21 - 0-19	Castlegar	Kenny Park, Athenry; Referee: Brian Keon
7 September 2024; 17:00; Round 3	Sean Gardiner (0-12 frees); Donagh Fahy (0-3); Eoin Murphy (1-0); Conor Cosgrove, Johnny Glynn (0-2); Cianan Fahy, Jason Kennedy (0-1)		Ger Farragher (0-9, 0-8 frees); Sean Neary (0-2); Donal Barry, Daniel McNulty, Jack Coyne, Darragh Neary, Dean Higgins, Greg Thomas, Enda Concannon, Cian Corcoran (0-1)	Kenny Park, Athenry; Referee: Brian Keon

=== Senior A – Relegation ===
==== Senior A – Relegation Semi-finals ====
21 September 2024; 16:45; Senior A – Relegation Semi-final	Oranmore-Maree	3-25 - 0-14	Gort	Duggan Park; Referee: Brian Keon
21 September 2024; 16:45; Senior A – Relegation Semi-final	Rory Burke (0-12, 0-6 frees, 0-2 '65s, 0-1 sideline); Ryan O'Donnell (2-2); Jake Keady (1-3); Colm Burke, Conor Hanniffy, Diarmuid Hanniffy (0-2); Gearoid McInerney, Eanna Burke (0-1)		Greg Lally (0-7, 0-1 free); Aiden Helebert (0-6 frees); Caoimhin Marren (0-1)	Duggan Park; Referee: Brian Keon

22 September 2024; 13:30; Senior A – Relegation Semi-final	Moycullen	0-23 - 2-16	Mullagh	Gort; Referee: John McDonagh
22 September 2024; 13:30; Senior A – Relegation Semi-final	Diarmuid Davoren (0-10, 0-3 frees); Colm Cunningham (0-6); Niall Mannion, Cian Folan (0-2); Tom O'Connor, Eanna Noone, James Bradley (0-1)		Stephen Cahalane (1-2); Cillian Finnerty (1-1); Conor Dolphin (0-4, 0-3 frees); Davy Glennon (0-4); Keith Coen, Sean Hardiman, Kevin Briscoe, Finnian Coone, Shane Connaughton (0-1)	Gort; Referee: John McDonagh

==== Senior A – Relegation Final ====
5 October 2024; Senior A – Relegation Final	Gort	1-9 - 0-11	Mullagh	New Inn; Referee: John Keane
5 October 2024; Senior A – Relegation Final	Richie Cummins (1-0); Aiden Helebert (0-3 frees); Jason Grealish (0-2, 0-1 free); Caoimhin Marren (0-2); Nathan Gill, Jason O'Donoghue (0-1)		Conor Dolphin (0-4 frees); Cathal Dervan, Damien Monaghan (0-2); Finian Coone, Keith Coen Jr (0-1)	New Inn; Referee: John Keane

=== Senior A – Preliminary Quarterfinals ===
21 September 2024; 16:30; Senior A – Preliminary Quarterfinal	Clarinbridge	3-22 - 0-14	Ardrahan	Kenny Park, Athenry; Referee: Karol Collins
21 September 2024; 16:30; Senior A – Preliminary Quarterfinal	Evan Niland (0-12, 0-4 frees, 0-1 '65); Gavin Lee (0-4); David Lee (1-1); Sean Kilduff (0-3); Mark Kennedy, Joshua Ryan (1-0); Liam Leen, Michael Daly (0-1)		Sean Gardiner (0-5, 0-4 frees, 0-1 '65); Jason Kennedy (0-4); Oisin Slevin (0-3); Darach Fahy (0-2 frees); Cathal Walsh, Eoin Murphy, Ben O'Connor, Enda Gardiner (0-1)	Kenny Park, Athenry; Referee: Karol Collins

22 September 2024; 13:00; Senior A – Preliminary Quarterfinal	Castlegar	2-25 - 0-13	Kilconieron	Kenny Park, Athenry; Referee: Derek Kelly
22 September 2024; 13:00; Senior A – Preliminary Quarterfinal	Ger Farragher (0-11, 0-9 frees); Oisin Connolly (1-2); Darragh Neary (0-4); Enda Concannon (1-1); Sean Neary (0-3); Simon Thomas (0-2); Donal Barry, Jack Coyne (0-1)		Sean Connaughton (0-12, 0-11 frees, 0-1 '65); Keith Burke (0-1)	Kenny Park, Athenry; Referee: Derek Kelly

22 September 2024; Senior A – Preliminary Quarterfinal	Cappataggle	3-27 - 2-15	Killimordaly	Kenny Park, Athenry; Referee: Karol Collins
22 September 2024; Senior A – Preliminary Quarterfinal	Niall Collins (0-13, 0-8 frees); Liam Collins (2-4, 0-1 sideline); Jarlath Mannion (0-5); Jack Coughlan (1-0); Cian Bowes (0-2); John Mitchell, Oisin Finn, James Egan (0-1)		Darren Daly (0-7, 0-3 frees, 0-2 '65s); Paul Creaven (1-2); Owen Earls (1-0); Brian Concannon, Eanna Ryan (0-2); Ronan Brett, Shane Monaghan (0-1)	Kenny Park, Athenry; Referee: Karol Collins

28 September 2024; 14:00; Senior A – Preliminary Quarterfinal	St Thomas'	2-21 - 1-13	Craughwell	Kenny Park, Athenry; Referee: Conor Quinlan
28 September 2024; 14:00; Senior A – Preliminary Quarterfinal	Conor Cooney (0-12, 0-10 frees, 0-1 '65); Eanna Burke (1-2, 0-1 sideline); Darragh Burke (1-1); Oisin Flannery (0-3); Fintan Burke, Shane Cooney, Victor Manso (0-1)		Oisin Quirke (0-7, 0-5 frees, 0-1 '65); Thomas Monaghan (0-3); Dean Callanan (1-0); Patrick Monaghan, Adrian Prendergast, Darragh McCartin (0-1)	Kenny Park, Athenry; Referee: Conor Quinlan

=== Senior A – Quarterfinals ===
5 October 2024; 14:30; Senior A – Quarterfinal	Clarinbridge	0-15 - 0-10	Tommy Larkin's	Kenny Park, Athenry; Referee: Conor Quinlan
5 October 2024; 14:30; Senior A – Quarterfinal	Evan Niland (0-9, 0-6 frees, 0-1 '65); Gavin Lee (0-5); Mark Kennedy (0-1)		Jason Flynn (0-6, 0-5 frees); Eanna Murphy, Conor Gardiner, Ronan Murphy, Conor Slattery (0-1 free)	Kenny Park, Athenry; Referee: Conor Quinlan

5 October 2024; 16:15; Senior A – Quarterfinal	Cappataggle	0-22 - 1-17	Sarsfields	Kenny Park, Athenry; Referee: Derek Kelly
5 October 2024; 16:15; Senior A – Quarterfinal	Niall Collins (0-8, 0-6 frees); Liam Collins (0-5); Jarlath Mannion (0-3); James Egan (0-2); Lewis Coughlan, Oran Finn, Oisin Finn, Cian Bowes (0-1)		Kevin Cooney (0-9, 0-7 frees); Michael Hanlon (1-0); Ian Fox, Adam Donoghue (0-2); Darragh Donoghue, Niall Quinn, Paddy MacCarthaigh, Alex Connaire (0-1)	Kenny Park, Athenry; Referee: Derek Kelly

6 October 2024; 13:30; Senior A – Quarterfinal	Loughrea	1-17 - 0-16	Castlegar	Kenny Park, Athenry; Referee: Liam Gordon
6 October 2024; 13:30; Senior A – Quarterfinal	Tiernan Killeen (0-10, 0-9 frees); Anthony Burns (1-1); Neil Keary (0-2); Shane Morgan (0-1 free); Ian Hanrahan, Joe Mooney, Jamie Ryan (0-1)		Ger Farragher (0-10, 0-9 frees, 0-1 '65); Jack Coyne (0-2); Simon Thomas, Sean Neary, Darragh Neary, Greg Thomas (0-1)	Kenny Park, Athenry; Referee: Liam Gordon

6 October 2024; 15:15; Senior A – Quarterfinal	St Thomas'	0-19 - 1-15	Turloughmore	Kenny Park, Athenry; Referee: Brian Keon
6 October 2024; 15:15; Senior A – Quarterfinal	Conor Cooney (0-8 frees); Oisin Flannery (0-3); Evan Duggan (0-2); John Headd, Fintan Burke, Shane Cooney, Cathal Burke, Eanna Burke, James Regan (0-1)		Comor Walsh (0-8, 0-7 frees, 0-1 '65); Cillian Whelan (1-0); Tom Quirke (0-2); Kevin Hussey, Dara Whelan, Sean Linnane, Barry Callanan, Sean Loftus (0-1)	Kenny Park, Athenry; Referee: Brian Keon

=== Senior A – Semi-finals ===
26 October 2024; 13:30; Senior A – Semi-final	Cappataggle	1-15 - 0-15	St Thomas'	Kenny Park, Athenry; Referee: Liam Gordon
26 October 2024; 13:30; Senior A – Semi-final	Niall Collins (0-7, 0-6 frees, 0-1 '65); Micheal Garvey (0-4, 0-2 frees); Oisin Finn (1-0); Jaralth Mannion, Liam Collins, Darragh Dolan, Declan Cronin (0-1)	Report	Conor Cooney (0-6, 0-3 frees); Eanna Burke (0-4); Victor Manso (0-2); Shane Cooney, Cathal Burke, O Flannery (0-1)	Kenny Park, Athenry; Referee: Liam Gordon

26 October 2024; 15:15; Senior A – Semi-final	Clarinbridge	1-16 - 3-16	Loughrea	Kenny Park, Athenry; Referee: John Keane
26 October 2024; 15:15; Senior A – Semi-final	Evan Niland (0-11, 0-10 frees, 0-1 '65); Cian Salmon (1-0); Gavin Lee (0-2); Joshua Ryan, David Lee, Liam Leen (0-1)		Darren Shaughnessy (2-1); Anthony Burns (1-3); Tiarnan Killeen (0-4 frees); Caimin Killeen, Sean Sweeney, Neil Keary (0-2); Ian Hanrahan, Cullen Killeen (0-1)	Kenny Park, Athenry; Referee: John Keane

=== Senior A – Final ===
10 November 2024; 13:45; Senior A – Final	Loughrea	1-15 - 0-16	Cappataggle	Kenny Park, Athenry; Referee: Brian Keon
10 November 2024; 13:45; Senior A – Final	Anthony Burns (1-3); Tiernan Killeen (0-4, 0-3 frees); Shane Morgan (0-3, 0-1 free, 0-1 '65); Ian Hanrahan (0-2); Shane O'Brien, Caimin Killeen, Neil Keary (0-1)	Report	Niall Collins (0-8, 0-5 frees, 0-2 '65s); Liam Collins (0-4); David Malone (0-3); Jarlath Mannion (0-1)	Kenny Park, Athenry; Referee: Brian Keon

== Senior B ==
Senior B consists of 8 teams divided into two groups of 4.

- The top team from each group will qualify for the semi-finals
- The second and third teams from each group will cross-play in 2 quarter finals
- The winner of the final will play in the 2025 Senior Hurling Championship
- The bottom teams from each group will play off with the loser relegated to Intermediate for 2025

=== Senior B – Group 1 ===
Pos	Team	Pld	W	D	L	SF	SA	Diff	Pts
1	Ballinderreen	3	2	0	1	7-50	4-49	+10	4
2	Kilnadeema-Leitrim	3	2	0	1	4-66	4-52	+14	4
3	Padraig Pearses	3	1	0	2	6-53	6-58	-5	2
4	Beagh	3	1	0	2	1-53	4-63	-19	2

10 August 2024; Round 1	Ballinderreen	4-17 - 2-18	Padraig Pearses	Loughrea; Referee: Paul Fahy
10 August 2024; Round 1	Luke Prendergast (2-5); Kevin Lane (1-3, 1-1 frees); Niall Coen (1-1); Padraig Lafferty (0-3); Robbie Meehan, Shane Larkin (0-2); Davif O'Connor (0-1)		Dean Reilly (1-6); Ronan Bellew (1-5, 0-4 frees); Jack Barrett (0-3, 0-2 frees, 0-1 '65); Luke Mitchell (0-3); Conor Fahey (0-1)	Loughrea; Referee: Paul Fahy

10 August 2024; Round 1	Kilnadeema-Leitrim	1-31 - 0-16	Beagh	Kilbeacanty; Referee: David Earls
10 August 2024; Round 1	Colm Molloy (1-11); Brian Molloy (0-7, 0-6 frees); Conor Molloy (0-5); Vinny Kenny, Daniel Comar, Adam Coyne (0-2); Eanna Kenny, Рodge Gavin (0-1)		Evan Hunt (0-6, 0-2 frees); Joe Gantley (0-4); David Keane (0-3); Adrian Tuohey (0-2); Padraic Landers (0-1)	Kilbeacanty; Referee: David Earls

25 August 2024; 13:00; Round 2	Ballinderreen	3-17 - 2-11	Kilnadeema-Leitrim	Gort; Referee: Noel Quinn
25 August 2024; 13:00; Round 2	Luke Prendergast (2-2); Kevin Lane (0-7, 0-6 frees); Niall Coen (1-4); Padraig Lafferty (0-3);		Conor Molloy (0-9 frees); Vinny Kenny, Colm Molloy (1-0); Mikey Lynch, Eanna Kenny (0-1)	Gort; Referee: Noel Quinn

25 August 2024; 16:00; Round 2	Padraig Pearses	3-16 - 1-17	Beagh	Loughrea; Referee: David Staunton
25 August 2024; 16:00; Round 2	Ronan Bellew (1-10, 0-9 frees); Emmet Ward (1-1); Cillian Fahey (1-0); Fearghal Flannery (0-2 frees); Jack Barrett (0-1 '65); Conor Fahey, Dean Reilly (0-1)		Evan Hunt (0-8, 0-4 frees); Cormac Neilan (1-0); Adrian Tuohey, David Keane (0-2); Kevin Keehan (0-2, 0-1 free); Tommy McKeown, Joe Gantley, Padraic Landers (0-1)	Loughrea; Referee: David Staunton

8 September 2024; 13:30; Round 3	Kilnadeema-Leitrim	1-24 - 1-19	Padraig Pearses	Duggan Park; Referee: Karol Collins
8 September 2024; 13:30; Round 3	Colm Molly (1-9, 0-1 free); Conor Molloy (0-8, 0-6 frees, 0-1 '65); Eanna Kenny (0-3); Jack Kenny (0-2); Mikey Lynch, Vinny Kenny (0-1)		Ronan Bellew (0-10, 0-8 frees, 0-1 '65); Cillian Fahey (1-3); Luke Mitchell (0-2); Oisin Flannery, Tomas Flannery, Dean Reilly (0-1); Jack Barrett (0-1 free)	Duggan Park; Referee: Karol Collins

8 September 2024; 13:30; Round 3	Beagh	0-20 - 0-16	Ballinderreen	Kilbeacanty; Referee: Shane Briscoe
8 September 2024; 13:30; Round 3	Evan Hunt (0-9, 0-4 frees, 0-1 '65); David Keane, Padraig Landers (0-3); Joe Gantley, Kevin Keehan (0-2); Shane McGuane (0-1)		Kevin Lane (0-7, 0-5 frees); Luke Prendergast (0-3); Michael Kelly (0-1 free); Robbie Meehan, Shane Larkin, Padraig Lafferty, David O'Connor (0-1); Roy Lane (0-1 '65)	Kilbeacanty; Referee: Shane Briscoe

=== Senior B – Group 2 ===
Pos	Team	Pld	W	D	L	SF	SA	Diff	Pts
1	Athenry	3	2	1	0	4-63	3-54	+12	5
2	Liam Mellows	3	2	0	1	7-62	6-55	+10	4
3	Portumna	3	1	0	2	3-68	7-68	-12	2
4	Ahascragh-Fohenagh	3	0	1	2	6-59	4-75	-10	1

10 August 2024; Round 1	Athenry	3-20 - 0-20	Liam Mellows	Pearse Stadium; Referee: Ronan McNulty
10 August 2024; Round 1	Cian Burke (0-10, 0-8 frees, 0-1 '65); Ronan Hardiman (1-5); Jack Carr, Jason Rabbitte (1-2); Conor Lawless (0-1)		Tadhg Haran (0-12, 0-10 frees, 0-1 '65); Ronan Elwood, Conor Kavanagh (0-2); Stephen Barrett, Luke McPhilbin, Conor Hynes, Adrian Morrissey (0-1)	Pearse Stadium; Referee: Ronan McNulty

10 August 2024; Round 1	Portumna	1-32 - 2-26	Ahascragh-Fohenagh	Duggan Park; Referee: John McDonagh
10 August 2024; Round 1	Joe Canning (1-15, 0-10 frees, 0-1 '65); Ronan O'Meara (0-7); Martin Tuohy, Adam Fogarty (0-5)		Padraig Mannion (0-6); Luke Kennedy (1-3); Mark Kelly (0-6, 0-3 frees); Owen Naughton (1-1); Diarmuid O'Brien, Luke Murray (0-3); Luke Cosgrove, Laurance Tully, Darragh Glynn, Ronan Kelly (0-1)	Duggan Park; Referee: John McDonagh

25 August 2024; 12:30; Round 2	Liam Mellows	2-20 - 2-13	Ahascragh-Fohenagh	Kenny Park, Athenry; Referee: Richard McNicholas
25 August 2024; 12:30; Round 2	Tadhg Haran (2-10, 0-8 frees); Conor Hynes (0-4); Adrian Morrissey (0-2); Eoin Finnerty, Ronan Elwood, Conor Elwood (0-1)		Cathal Mannion (1-5, 1-0 penalty, 0-2 frees); Luke Murray (1-1); Mark Kelly (0-3 frees); Padraic Mannion, Diarmuid O'Brien (0-2)	Kenny Park, Athenry; Referee: Richard McNicholas

25 August 2024; 14:45; Round 2	Athenry	0-20 - 1-14	Portumna	Gort; Referee: Paul Fahy
25 August 2024; 14:45; Round 2	Cian Burke (0-11, 0-7 frees, 0-1 '65); Ronan Hardiman (0-3); Ryan O'Donnell, Cillian Lawless (0-2); Jack Carr, Donal Parr (0-1)		Joe Canning (0-12, 0-8 frees); Adam Fogarty (1-0); Ronan O'Meara, Neil Connelly (0-1)	Gort; Referee: Paul Fahy

7 September 2024; 15:15; Round 3	Liam Mellows	5-22 - 1-22	Portumna	Gort; Referee: Peter Cummins
7 September 2024; 15:15; Round 3	Tadhg Haran (1-6, 0-2 frees); Conor Hynes (0-5); Adrian Morrissey (1-2); Conor Elwood, Conor Kavanagh (1-1); Jack Keville (1-0); Jack Forde (0-3); Eoin Finnerty (0-2); Mark Hughes, Luke McPhiblin (0-1)		Joe Canning (0-8, 0-6 frees); Declan McLaughlin (1-4); Adam Canning, Ronan O'Meara, Adam Fogarty (0-3)	Gort; Referee: Peter Cummins

7 September 2024; 17:00; Round 3	Ahascragh-Fohenagh	2-20 - 1-23	Athenry	Pearse Stadium; Referee: Alan Kelly
7 September 2024; 17:00; Round 3	Mark Kelly Sr (0-4 frees); Cathal Mannion (0-6); Darragh Glynn (2-0); Ronan Kelly (0-3); Owen Naughton (0-2); Padraig Mannion, Diarmuid O'Brien, Luke Murray, Robert Greene, Liam Warde (0-1)		Cian Burke (0-13, 0-10 frees); Ronan Hardiman (0-4); Cillian Lawless (0-3); Jack Carr (1-0); Paddy Hannon (0-2); Donal Parr (0-1)	Pearse Stadium; Referee: Alan Kelly

==== Senior B – Relegation ====
21 September 2024; 15:00; Senior B – Relegation	Beagh	1-19 - 1-19	Ahascragh-Fohenagh	Duggan Park; Referee: Shane Hynes
21 September 2024; 15:00; Senior B – Relegation	Evan Hunt (0-8, 0-6 frees); Joe Gantley (0-4); David Keane (0-3); Adrian Tuohey (0-2); Padraic Landers, Shane McGuane (0-1); Kevin Keehan (0-1 free)	Report	Mark Kelly (0-7 frees); Robert Greene (1-3); Cathal Mannion (0-3); Luke Kennedy (0-2); Padraig Mannion, John Finnerty, Diarmuid O'Brien, Owen Naughton (0-1)	Duggan Park; Referee: Shane Hynes

==== Senior B – Relegation Replay ====
5 October 2024; 13:30; Senior B – Relegation Replay	Ahascragh-Fohenagh	0-11 - 0-10	Beagh	Carnmore; Referee: Alan Kelly
5 October 2024; 13:30; Senior B – Relegation Replay	Mark Kelly (0-7, 0-5 frees); Luke Kennedy (0-2); Padraig Mannion, Cathal Mannion (0-1)		David Keane (0-7, 0-5 frees); Padraig Landers (0-2); Joe Gantley (0-1)	Carnmore; Referee: Alan Kelly

=== Senior B – Quarter-finals ===
22 September 2024; 15:15; Senior B – Quarter-final	Liam Mellows	0-21 - 1-14	Padraig Pearses	Duggan Park
22 September 2024; 15:15; Senior B – Quarter-final	Tadhg Haran (0-9, 0-7 frees); Jack Forde (0-5); Sean Morrissey (0-3); Mark Hughes, Conor Hynes, Adrian Morrissey, Conor Kavanagh (0-1)		Emmet Ward (0-4 frees); Ronan Bellew (0-3, 0-2 frees); Fearghal Flannery (1-0 free), Oisin Flannery (0-2); Mark Hennelly, Conor Fahey, Dean Reilly, Cian Murphy, Diarmuid Fahey (0-1)	Duggan Park

22 September 2024; 17:00; Senior B – Quarter-final	Portumna	3-20 -2-20	Kilnadeema-Leitrim	Duggan Park; Referee: Sean Byrne
22 September 2024; 17:00; Senior B – Quarter-final	Joe Canning (1-6, 0-5 frees, 0-1 penalty); Martin Tuohy (1-2); Ronan O'Meara (0-5); Declan McLoughlin (1-0); Andrew Canning, Neil Connelly (0-2); Jamie Hogan, Adam Fogarty, Adam Canning (0-1)		Conor Molloy (0-8 frees); Colm Molloy (2-2); Eanna Kenny (0-3); Mikie Lynch (0-2); Stephen Molloy, Tom Tierney, Vinny Kenny, Adam Coyne, Jake Nee (0-1)	Duggan Park; Referee: Sean Byrne

=== Senior B – Semi-finals ===
6 October 2024; 14:30; Senior B – Semi-final	Athenry	1-20 - 1-15	Liam Mellows	Duggan Park; Referee: Karol Collins
6 October 2024; 14:30; Senior B – Semi-final	Cian Burke (0-10, 0-5 frees, 0-2 '65s); Jason Rabbitte (1-2); Ronan Hardiman (0-3); Cillian Lawless (0-2); Paddy Hannon, Eoin Caulfield, Noel Keogh (0-1)		Tadhg Haran (0-8, 0-6 frees); Conor Elwood (1-0); Ed O'Reilly, Jack Keville, Mark Hughes, Luke McPhiblin, Jack Forde, Conor Hynes, Adrian Morrissey (0-1)	Duggan Park; Referee: Karol Collins

6 October 2024; Senior B – Semi-final	Portumna	2-20 - 1-16	Ballinderreen	Duggan Park; Referee: Paul Fahy
6 October 2024; Senior B – Semi-final	Joe Canning (2-13, 0-11 frees, 1-0 penalty, 0-1 '65); Jamie Hogan, Ronan O'Meara (0-2); Andrew Canning, Declan McLaughlin, Adam Fogarty (0-1)		Roy Lane (0-6 frees); Luke Prendergast (1-2); Niall Coen (0-4); Robbie Meehan (0-3); Padraig Lafferty (0-1)	Duggan Park; Referee: Paul Fahy

=== Senior B – Final ===
19 October 2024; 20:00; Senior B – Final	Athenry	1-21 - 3-13	Portumna	Duggan Park; Referee: Christy Browne
19 October 2024; 20:00; Senior B – Final	Cian Burke (1-12, 0-9 frees, 0-1 '65); Ronan Hardiman (0-4); Cillian Lawless (0-2); Shane Quirke, Eoin Caulfield, Jason Rabbitte (0-1)	Report	Joe Canning (2-4, 1-3 frees, 1-0 penalty); Declan McLaughlin (1-1); Andrew Canning, Jack Canning (0-2); Martin Dolhpin, Martin Tuohy, Adam Fogarty, Neil Connelly (0-1)	Duggan Park; Referee: Christy Browne
