= Shane Cooney =

Irish hurler

Personal information
- Native name: Seán Ó Cuana (Irish)
- Born: 1995 (age 30–31) Peterswell, County Galway, Ireland
- Height: 6 ft 0 in (183 cm)

Sport
- Sport: Hurling
- Position: Centre-back
Club
- Years: Club
- 2012-present: St Thomas'
Club titles
- Galway titles: 8
- All-Ireland Titles: 2
College
- Years: College
- NUI Galway
College titles
- Fitzgibbon titles: 0
Inter-county*
| Years | County | Apps (scores) |
| 2018-present | Galway | 1 (0-00) |
Inter-county titles
- Leinster titles: 1
- All-Irelands: 0
- NHL: 1
- All Stars: 0
- *Inter County team apps and scores correct as of 16:10, 29 August 2018.

Shane Cooney (born 1995) is an Irish hurler who plays for Galway Senior Championship club St Thomas' and at inter-county level with the Galway senior hurling team. He is usually deployed as a centre-back. His brother, Conor Cooney, also plays for both teams.

== Playing career ==
=== St Thomas' ===
Cooney was just 17-years old when he joined the St Thomas' senior hurling team. On 18 November 2012, he was introduced as a 35th-minute substitute when St Thomas' defeated Loughrea by 3–11 to 2–11 to win the Galway Senior Championship. On 17 March 2013, Cooney was at centre-back when St Thomas' defeated Kilcormac/Killoughey by 1–11 to 1–09 in the All-Ireland final.

On 16 October 2016, Cooney was at centre-back when St Thomas' defeated Gort by 1–11 to 0–10 to win their second ever Galway Senior Championship.

On 18 November 2018, Cooney won a third Galway Senior Championship medal from centre-back after a 2–13 to 0–10 defeat of reigning champions Liam Mellows.

=== Galway ===
==== Minor and under-21 ====
Cooney first played for the Galway minor hurling team on 28 July 2012 in a 4–20 to 2–11 defeat of Wexford in the All-Ireland quarter-final. He was eligible for the minor grade again the following year and, on 8 September 2013, was at centre-back for Galway's 1–21 to 0–16 defeat by Waterford in the All-Ireland final at Croke Park.

On 22 August 2015, Cooney made his first appearance for the Galway under-21 hurling team in a 1–20 to 0–17 defeat by Limerick in the All-Ireland semi-final.

On 10 September 2016, Cooney was at centre-back when Galway suffered a 5–15 to 0–14 defeat by Waterford in the All-Ireland final. It was his last game in the under-21 grade.

==== Senior ====
Cooney made his first appearance for the Galway senior hurling team on 3 February 2018 in a 2–18 to 0–17 defeat of Laois in the National Hurling League. On 9 June, he made his first Leinster Championship appearance when he came on as a 50th-minute substitute for Paul Killeen in a 0–26 to 2–19 defeat of Dublin. On 8 July, Cooney was an unused substitute for Galway's 1–28 to 3–15 defeat of Kilkenny in the Leinster final. In the subsequent All-Ireland final against Limerick on 19 August, he was also an unused substitute fr Galway's 3–16 to 2–18 defeat.

== Career statistics ==
As of match played 19 August 2018.

| Team | Year | National League | | | Leinster | | All-Ireland | | Total | |
| Team | Year | Division | Apps | Score | Apps | Score | Apps | Score | Apps | Score |
|---|---|---|---|---|---|---|---|---|---|---|
| Galway | 2018 | Division 1B | 4 | 0-00 | 1 | 0-00 | 0 | 0-00 | 5 | 0-00 |
| Total | | | 4 | 0-00 | 1 | 0-00 | 0 | 0-00 | 5 | 0-00 |

== Honours ==
St Thomas'

- All-Ireland Senior Club Hurling Championship (1): 2013
- Galway Senior Hurling Championship (6): 2012, 2016, 2018, 2019, 2020, 2021

Galway

- National Hurling League (1): 2021
- Leinster Senior Hurling Championship (1): 2018
