= 2024 All-Ireland Senior Club Hurling Championship final =

2024 All-Ireland Senior Club Hurling Championship Final
- Event: 2023-24 All-Ireland Senior Club Hurling Championship
St Thomas	O'Loughlin Gaels
0-18	0-17
- Date: 21 January 2024
- Venue: Croke Park, Dublin
- Man of the Match: David Burke
- Referee: Seán Stack (Dublin)
- Weather: Wind and Rain

The 2024 All-Ireland Senior Club Hurling Championship final was a hurling match that was played at Croke Park on 20 January 2024 to determine the winners of the 2023-24 All-Ireland Senior Club Hurling Championship, the 53rd season of the All-Ireland Senior Club Hurling Championship, a tournament organised by the Gaelic Athletic Association for the champion clubs of the four provinces of Ireland. The match was shown live on TG4.

The final was contested by St Thomas and O'Loughlin Gaels and was shown live on TG4.

In a match played in wet and stormy conditions, St. Thomas' captained by Conor Cooney won by 0–18 to 0–17 to claim their second All-Ireland title overall and a first title in 10 years.

Éanna Burke scored the winning point for St. Thomas' in added time with an over the shoulder point from out on the left near the touchline at the hill 16 end. James Regan had been sent-off for St. Thomas' two minutes into the second half for a shoulder charge. O'Loughlin Gaels appeared to have scored a goal in the 11th minute when a low shot from Owen Wall looked to have gone over the goal-line before being cleared by Fintan Burke.

== Details ==
21 January 2024 Final	St. Thomas' (Galway)	0-18 - 0-17	O'Loughlin Gaels (Kilkenny)	Croke Park
	C Cooney 0-6 (4fs), D Burke, E Burke 0-3 each, J Regan, V Manso 0-2 each, C Burke, G Kelly (f) 0-1 each.	Report	M Bergin 0-4 (2fs), P Deegan, S Bolger, D Fogarty, J Molloy all 0-2 each, M Butler, S Murphy (f), C Kelly, L Hogan, C Heary all 0-1 each	Referee: S Stack (Dublin)
