= Kenneth Burke (hurler) =

Irish hurler

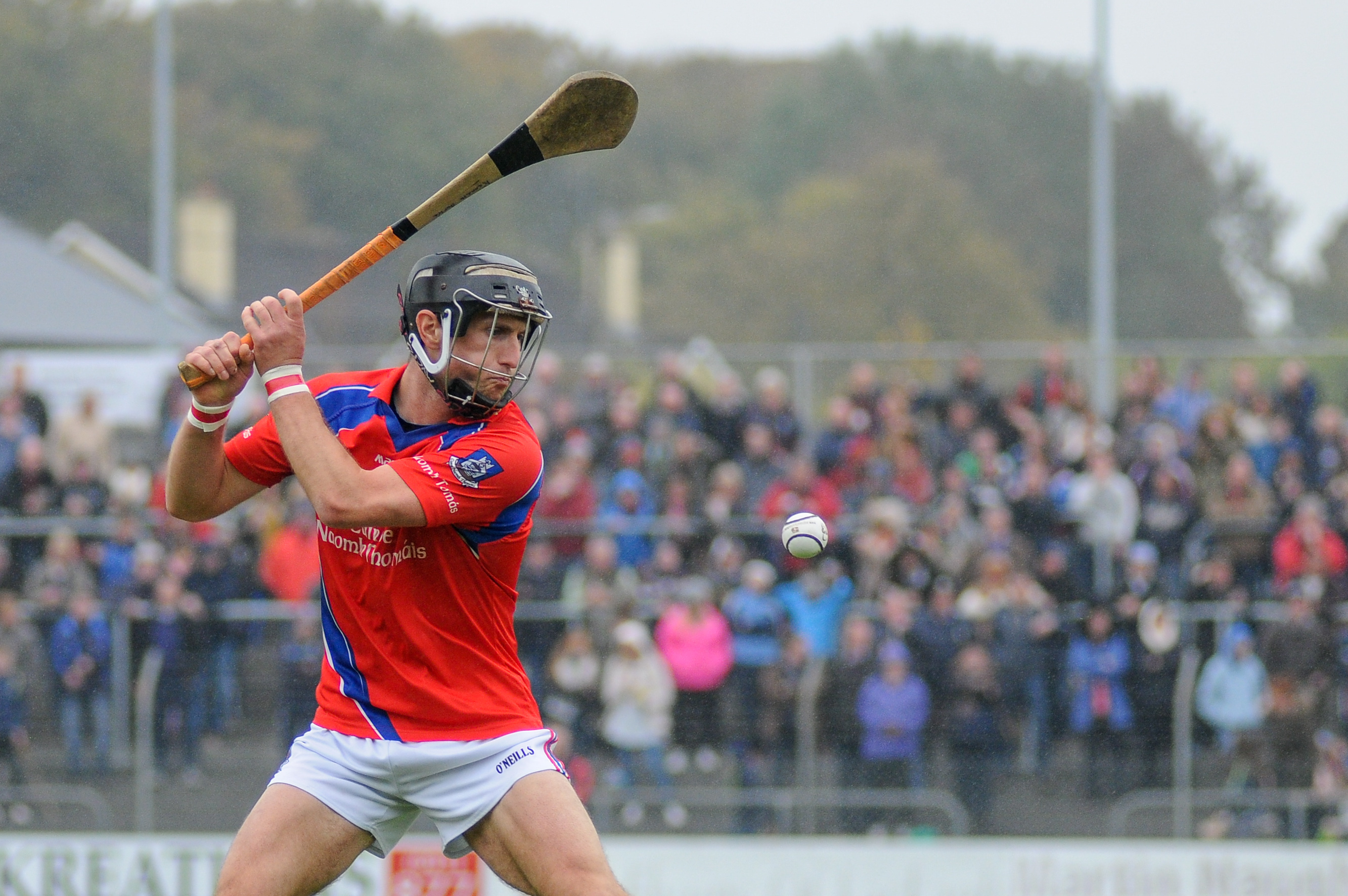
- Kenneth Burke in 2015

Personal information
- Native name: Cionnaith de Búrca (Irish)
- Born: 1984 (age 41–42) Ballinasloe, County Galway, Ireland
- Occupation: Electrician
- Height: 5 ft 9 in (175 cm)

Sport
- Sport: Hurling
- Position: Left wing-forward
Club
- Years: Club
- 2001-2018: St Thomas'
Club titles
- Galway titles: 3
- All-Ireland Titles: 1
Inter-county
| Years | County | Apps (scores) |
| 2003-2008 | Galway | 2 (0-01) |
Inter-county titles
- All-Irelands: 0
- NHL: 0
- All Stars: 0

Kenneth Burke (born 1984) is an Irish hurling manager and former player. At club level, he played with St Thomas' and also lined out at inter-county level with various Galway teams.

== Playing career ==
Burke first played hurling at juvenile and underage levels with the St Thomas' club. He eventually progressed to adult level and was part of the St. Thomas' team that won Galway IHC and Connacht Club IHC titles in 2004. Burke later won three Galway SHC titles and was at midfield for the two-point defeat of Kilcormac/Killoughey in the 2013 All-Ireland club final.

Burke's inter-county career with Galway began with a two-year association with the minor team. He was an All-Ireland MHC runner-up in his first year with the team in 2001. Burke later progressed to under-21 level and captained the team to a defeat of Kilkenny in the 2005 All-Ireland under-21 final. He was also a member of the intermediate team that lost out to Wexford in that year's final.

By that stage, Burke had already joined the Galway senior hurling team. He made his debut in 2003, however, he remained a peripheral figure, lining out in several National Hurling League games before leaving the panel in 2008.

== Management career ==
Burke first became involved in inter-county management when he was a selector under Jeffrey Lynskey with the Galway minor team that won the All-Ireland MHC title in 2018. His association with Lynskey continued to under-20 level, and he was again a selector when the Leinster U20HC title was secured in 2021.

Burke has also been heavily involved in team management and coaching at all levels with the St. Thomas' club. He was manager of the club's senior team that won three Galway SHC titles from 2021 to 2023. Burke also guided St. Thomas' to the All-Ireland Club SHC title in 2024 after an 0–18 to 0–17 defeat of O'Loughlin Gaels in the final.

== Personal life ==
His brother, David Burke, captained Galway to the All-Ireland SHC title in 2017. Another brother, Éanna Burke, was also a member of the team.

== Honours ==
=== Player ===
St. Thomas'

- All-Ireland Senior Club Hurling Championship: 2013
- Galway Senior Hurling Championship: 2012, 2016, 2018
- Connacht Intermediate Club Hurling Championship: 2004
- Galway Intermediate Hurling Championship: 2004

Galway

- All-Ireland Under-21 Hurling Championship: 2005 (c)

=== Management ===
St. Thomas'

- All-Ireland Senior Club Hurling Championship: 2024
- Galway Senior Hurling Championship: 2021, 2022, 2023

Galway

- Leinster Under-20 Hurling Championship: 2021
- All-Ireland Minor Hurling Championship: 2018

Achievements
| Preceded by James "Cha" Fitzpatrick | All-Ireland Under-21 Hurling Final winning captain 2005 | Succeeded by Michael Fennelly |
