= James Regan (hurler) =

Galway hurler

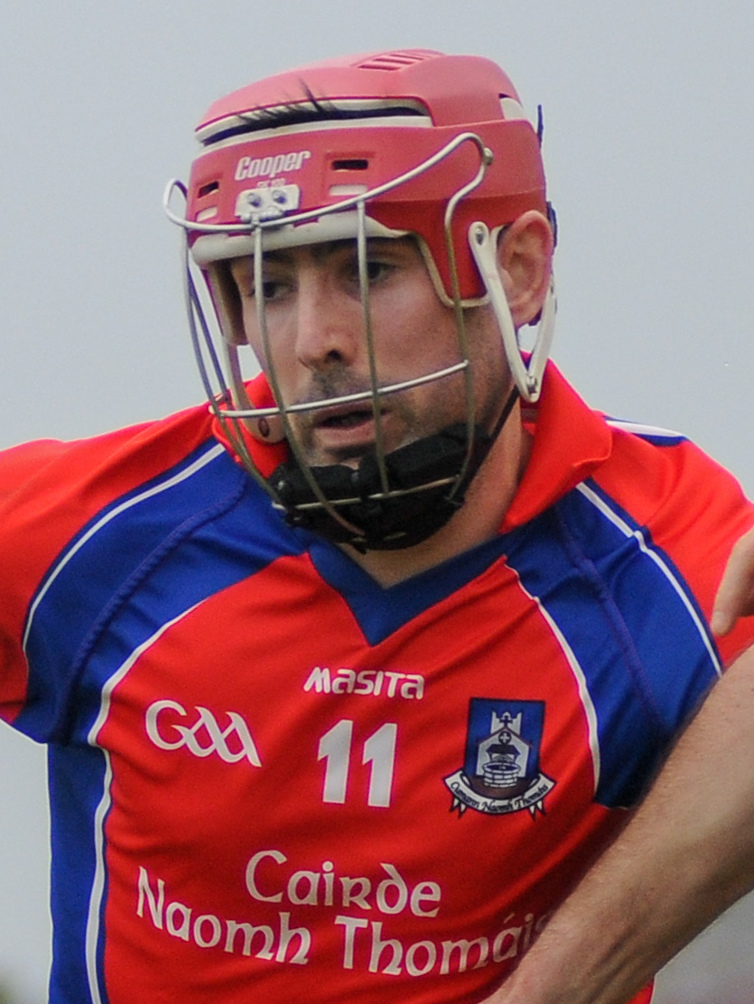
- James Regan in 2015

Personal information
- Native name: Séamus Ó Ríagáin (Irish)
- Born: 7 February 1991 (age 35) Ballinasloe, Ireland
- Height: 1.83 m (6 ft 0 in)

Sport
- Sport: Hurling
- Position: Right corner forward
Club
- Years: Club
- 2008: St Thomas'
Club titles
- Galway titles: 6
- Leinster titles: 0
- All-Ireland Titles: 1
Inter-county
| Years | County | Apps (scores) |
| 2011– | Galway | 11 (1–9) |
Inter-county titles
- Leinster titles: 1

James Regan (born 7 February 1991) is an Irish sportsman. He plays hurling with his local club St Thomas' and has been a member at senior level of the Galway county team since 2011.

== Playing career ==
=== Club ===
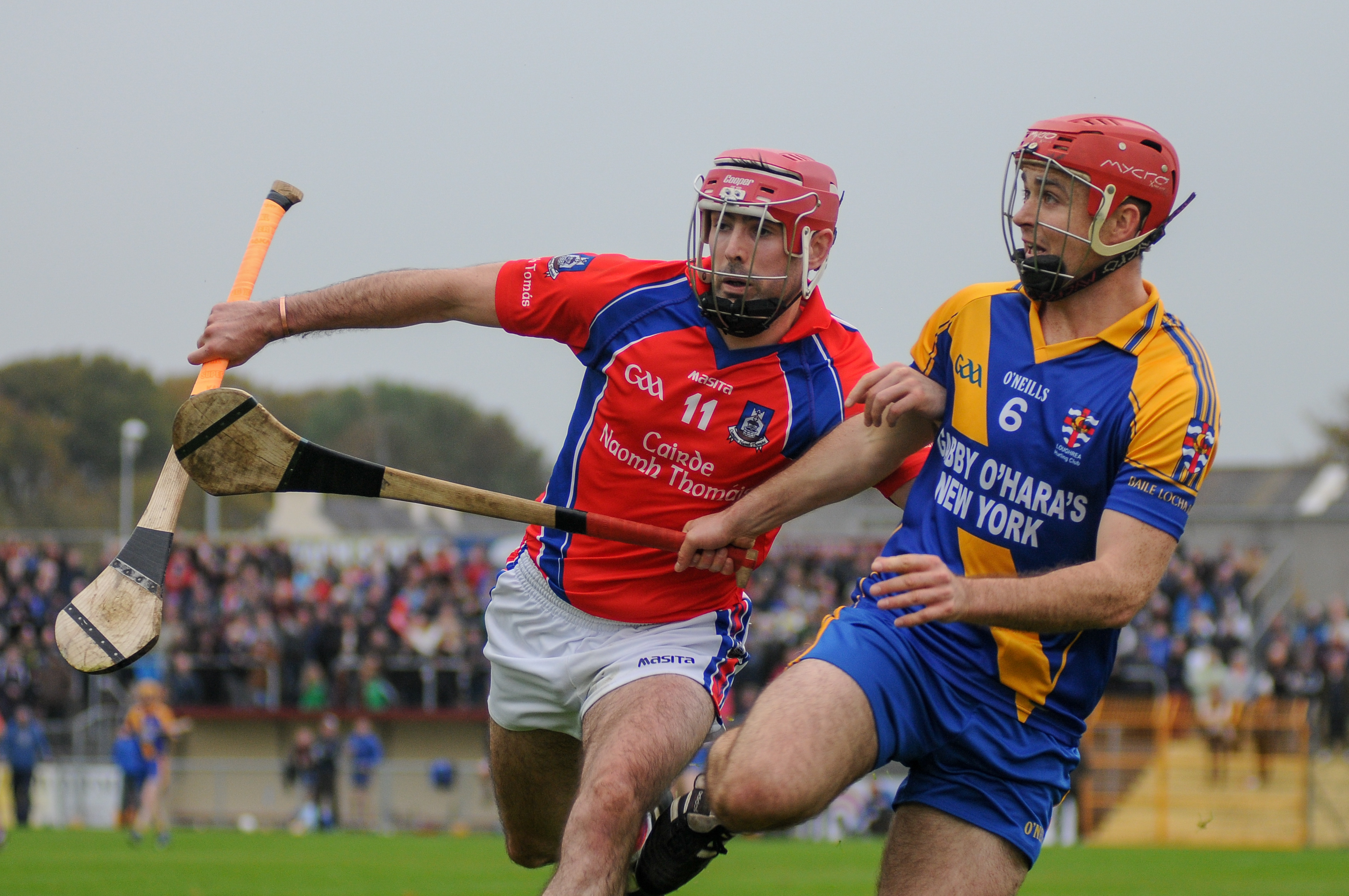
James Regan (left) playing for St Thomas' and Paul Hoban (right) playing for Loughrea in 2015

Regan plays his club hurling with St Thomas'. He made his senior debut in 2006 while he was still an underage player.

=== Inter-county ===
Regan first played for Galway at minor level in 2009. It was a successful year for the young Tribesmen as they reached the All-Ireland final. Kilkenny provided the opposition; however, Galway won by 2–15 to 2-11 giving Regan an All-Ireland Minor Hurling Championship medal.

The following year Regan joined the county under-21 team. Once again Galway reached the All-Ireland final where Tipperary provided the opposition. That game ended in a rout as Tipp won by 5–22 to 0–12.

Regan made his senior championship debut when he came on as a substitute against Clare in an All-Ireland qualifier in 2011.

== Personal life ==
Regan is a teacher at Coláiste Bhaile Chláir in Claregalway.

== Honours ==
St Thomas'

- All-Ireland Senior Club Hurling Championship (1): 2013
- Galway Senior Hurling Championship (6): 2012, 2016, 2018, 2019, 2020, 2021
