= Conor Cooney =

Irish hurler (born 1992)

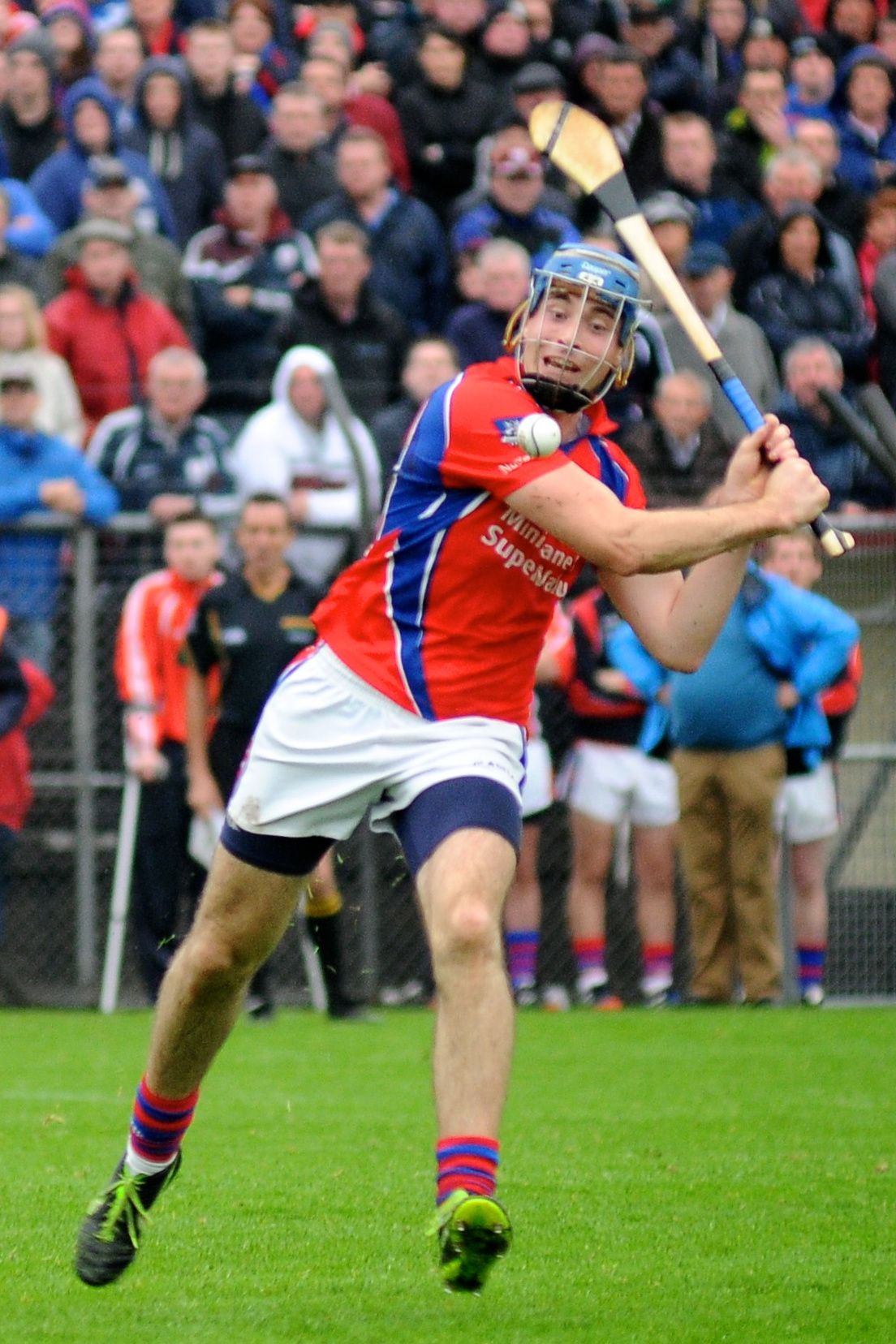
- Cooney in action for St Thomas'

Personal information
- Native name: Conchúr Ó Cuana (Irish)
- Born: 22 October 1992 (age 34) Ballinasloe, Ireland
- Occupation: Primary school teacher
- Height: 1.88 m (6 ft 2 in)

Sport
- Sport: Hurling
- Position: Full-forward
Club
- Years: Club
- St Thomas'
Club titles
- Galway titles: 8
- All-Ireland Titles: 2
Inter-county*
Years	County	Apps (scores)
2012–present	Galway	67 (14–200)
Inter-county titles
- Leinster titles: 4
- All-Irelands: 1
- NHL: 2
- All Stars: 1
- *Inter County team apps and scores correct as of match played 21 June 2025.

Conor Cooney (born 22 October 1992) is an Irish hurler who plays for Galway Senior Championship club St Thomas' and at inter-county level with the Galway senior hurling team. He usually lines out as a full-forward.

== Playing career ==
=== Gort Community School ===
Cooney first came to prominence as a hurler with Gort Community School. He played in every grade of hurling before eventually joining the school's senior team. On 8 March 2008, he won a Connacht Colleges Championship medal as a non-playing substitute following Gort's 2–16 to 0–15 defeat of Mercy Colleges in the final.

After breaking onto the starting fifteen, Cooney lined out at midfield when Gort Community School faced Portumna Community School in the Connacht final on 21 March 2009. He scored four points from frees and claimed a second winners' medal - his first on the field of play - after a 2–14 to 0–08 victory.

On 6 March 2010, Cooney lined out in a third successive Connacht final. He scored three points from full-forward but ended the game on the losing side after suffering a 1–13 to 2–09 defeat by Presentation College from Athenry.

=== Mary Immaculate College ===
During his studies at the Mary Immaculate College in Limerick, Cooney was selected for the college's senior hurling team. On 2 March 2013, he lined out at left wing-forward when Mary I faced University College Cork in the Fitzgibbon Cup final. Cooney scored 1-03, including a goal from a penalty, but ended the game on the losing side after a 2–17 to 2–12 defeat.

=== St Thomas' ===
==== Minor and under-21 ====
Cooney joined the St Thomas' club at a young age and played in all grades at juvenile and underage levels. On 2 November 2008, he was at left corner-forward when St Thomas' faced Athenry in the Galway Minor A Championship final. Cooney scored two points from play in the 2–17 to 2–10 victory.

Cooney subsequently progressed onto the club's under-21 team. On 5 May 2013, he claimed an under-21 championship winners' medal after St Thomas' 1–10 to 0–11 defeat of Tynagh-Abbey/Duniry in the final.

==== Senior ====
On 18 November 2012, Cooney lined out at centre-forward when St Thomas' faced Loughrea in their very first county final. He scored four points, including two frees, and claimed a winners' medal after the 3–11 to 2–11 victory. On 17 March 2013, Cooney was again selected at centre-forward when St Thomas' qualified for an All-Ireland final appearance against Kilcormac/Killoughey. He top-scored for the team with five points and collected an All-Ireland medal after the 1–09 to 1–07 victory.

On 16 October 2016, Cooney lined out at right wing-forward in his second Galway Championship final. Her scored six points overall and collected a second winners' medal after the 1–11 to 0–10 defeat of Gort.

Cooney captained the team from full-forward when lined out in his third county final on 18 November 2018. He scored 1-01 from play and claimed a third winners' medal following a 2–13 to 0–10 defeat of Liam Mellows.

St Thomas' qualified for a second successive final on 10 November 2019, with Cooney once again captaining the team from full-forward. He was held scoreless throughout but ended the game with a fourth winners' medal after the 1–13 to 0–14 defeat of Liam Mellows.

=== Galway ===
==== Minor and under-21 ====
Cooney first played for Galway as a 16-year-old member of the minor team during the 2009 All-Ireland Championship. He made his first appearance for the team on 25 July 2009 when he came on as a substitute at midfield for James Regan and scored a point in a 4–23 to 0–10 defeat of Antrim. On 6 September 2009, Cooney won an All-Ireland Championship medal as a non-playing substitute when Galway defeated Kilkenny by 2–15 to 2–11 in the final.

Cooney was eligible for the minor grade for a second successive season in 2010. He made his last appearance for the team on 8 August 2010 when Galway suffered a 5–19 to 0–15 defeat by Kilkenny in the All-Ireland semi-final.

On 20 August 2011, Cooney made his first appearance for the Galway under-21 team. He scored a point from right wing-forward in a 0–22 to 2–14 defeat of Limerick in the All-Ireland semi-final. He was switched to full-forward for the All-Ireland final against Dublin on 10 September 2011. Cooney was held scoreless but collected a winners' medal following the 3–14 to 1–10 victory.

Cooney played his last game in the under-21 grade on 24 August 2013 when he scored a point from centre-forward in a 1–16 to 0–7 defeat by Clare in the All-Ireland semi-final.

==== Senior ====
Cooney was added to the Galway senior team in advance of the 2012 National League. He made his first appearance for the team on 26 February 2012 when he scored four points from right wing-forward in a 0–20 to 0–13 defeat of Dublin. Cooney made his Leinster Championship debut on 3 June 2012 in a 5–19 to 4–12 defeat of Westmeath. On 8 July 2012, he was at full-forward for Galway's first ever Leinster Championship title following a 2–21 to 2–11 defeat of Kilkenny in the final. Cooney was dropped from the starting fifteen for Galway's All-Ireland final meeting with Kilkenny on 9 September 2012. Galway led by 1–09 to 0–07 at half-time, however, it took a 73rd-minute free from Joe Canning to level the scores at 2–13 to 0–19. Cooney again failed to make the starting fifteen for the replay on 30 September 2012 but was introduced as a substitute for Niall Burke in the 3–22 to 3–11 defeat.

On 7 July 2013, Cooney scored two points from centre-forward for Galway when they suffered a 2–25 to 2–13 defeat by Dublin in the Leinster final.

Cooney's 2015 season was hampered by a series of injuries, however, he was included on the team for the All-Ireland final against Kilkenny on 6 September 2015. He was introduced as a substitute for Andy Smith but ended the game on the losing side following a 1–22 to 1–18 defeat.

On 3 July 2016, Cooney lined out at left wing-forward when Galway faced Kilkenny in the Leinster final. He scored three points from play but ended the game on the losing side after a 1–26 to 0–22 defeat.

On 22 April 2017, Cooney was a non-playing substitute when Galway won the National League title after a 3–21 to 0–14 victory over Tipperary in the final. The subsequent championship saw Galway qualify for a Leinster final meeting with Wexford. Cooney ended the game with a second provincial winners' medal after scoring 0–08 in the 0–29 to 1–17 victory. On 3 September 2017, Cooney was at full-forward when Galway faced Waterford in the All-Ireland final. He scored three points from play in the 0–26 to 2–17 victory and a first All-Ireland Championship for Galway in 29 years. Cooney ended the season by winning a GAA/GPA All-Star.

On 1 July 2018, Cooney scored a point from play in Galway's 0-18 apiece draw with Kilkenny in the Leinster final. The replay a week later saw him end the game with a third provincial winners' medal after Galway's 1–28 to 3–15 victory. On 19 August 2018, Canning was at full-forward when Galway faced Limerick in the All-Ireland final. He was held scoreless throughout the game before being substituted in the 57th minute as Limerick won their first title in 45 years after a 3–16 to 2–18 victory.

=== Connacht ===
On 4 March 2012, Cooney was selected for the Connacht inter-provincial team for the first time. He top-scored with 0-09 from centre-forward but ended the game on the losing side after a 2–19 to 1–15 defeat by Leinster in the Railway Cup final.

After a one-year absence, Cooney was included on the Connacht team once again during the 2014 Railway Cup. On 1 March 2014, he scored 0-08 from centre-forward when Connacht suffered a 1–23 to 0–16 defeat by Leinster in the final.

== Career statistics ==
As of match played 21 June 2025

Team	Year	National League			Leinster		All-Ireland		Total	
Team	Year	Division	Apps	Score	Apps	Score	Apps	Score	Apps	Score
Galway	2012	Division 1A	5	0-09	3	2-02	3	0-00	11	2-11
Galway	2013	Division 1A	2	0-00	2	0-02	1	0-00	5	0-02
Galway	2014	Division 1A	6	3-38	3	2-25	1	0-04	10	5-67
Galway	2015	Division 1A	0	0-00	0	0-00	1	0-00	1	0-00
Galway	2016	Division 1A	0	0-00	3	1-10	2	2-07	5	3-17
Galway	2017	Division 1B	6	2-16	3	1-12	2	0-05	11	3-33
Galway	2018	Division 1B	6	0-18	6	0-14	3	1-02	15	1-34
Galway	2019	Division 1B	0	0-00	2	1-04	—		2	1-04
Galway	2020	Division 1A	4	0-05	2	0-00	2	0-01	8	0-06
Galway	2021	Division 1A	4	2-11	1	0-01	1	0-01	6	2-13
Galway	2022	Division 1A	4	0-37	6	1-51	2	0-09	12	1-97
Galway	2023				5	0-10	2	0-00	7	0-10
Galway	2024				5	2-25	—		5	2-25
Galway	2025				5	1-14	1	0-01	6	1-15
Total			37	7-134	46	11-170	21	3-30	103	21-334

== Honours ==
=== Player ===
Gort Community School

- Connacht Colleges Senior Hurling Championship (2): 2008, 2009

St Thomas'

- All-Ireland Senior Club Hurling Championship (2): 2013, 2024 (c)
- Galway Senior Hurling Championship (8): 2012, 2016, 2018 (c), 2019 (c), 2020 (c), 2021, 2022 (c), 2023 (c)

Galway

- All-Ireland Senior Hurling Championship (1): 2017
- Leinster Senior Hurling Championship (4): 2012, 2017, 2018, 2026
- National Hurling League (2): 2017, 2021
- All-Ireland Under-21 Hurling Championship (1): 2011
- All-Ireland Minor Hurling Championship (1): 2009

=== Honours ===
Awards

- GAA/GPA All-Star (1): 2017
