= Éanna Burke =

Irish hurler

Personal information
- Native name: Éanna de Búrca (Irish)
- Born: 21 October 1995 (age 31) Peterswell, County Galway, Ireland
- Occupation: Student
- Height: 5 ft 10 in (178 cm)

Sport
- Sport: Hurling
- Position: Midfield
Club
- Years: Club
- 2012-present: St Thomas'
Club titles
- Galway titles: 8
- All-Ireland Titles: 2
Inter-county
- Years: County
- 2015-present: Galway
Inter-county titles
- Leinster titles: 2
- All-Irelands: 1
- NHL: 1
- All Stars: 0

Éanna Burke (born 21 October 1995) is an Irish hurler who plays as a midfielder for the Galway senior team.

== Career ==
Burke made his debut on the inter-county scene at the age of sixteen when he was selected for the Galway minor team. He enjoyed two championship seasons with the minor team and ended his tenure with the team as an All-Ireland runner-up. Burke subsequently joined the Galway under-21 team and was also an All-Ireland runner-up in that grade. As a member of the Galway intermediate team he won an All-Ireland medal in 2015. By this stage Burke had also joined the Galway senior team, making his debut during the 2015 Walsh Cup. Since then he has on one All-Ireland medal, two Leinster medals and one National Hurling League medal. His brother, David Burke, is also an All-Ireland medal winner with Galway.

On 3 September 2017, Burke was a non playing substitute for Galway as they won their first All-Ireland Senior Hurling Championship in 29 years against Waterford.

== Honours ==
St Thomas'

- All-Ireland Senior Club Hurling Championship (2): 2012-13, 2023-24
- Galway Senior Hurling Championship (8): 2012, 2016, 2018, 2019, 2020, 2021, 2022, 2023

Galway

- All-Ireland Senior Hurling Championship (1): 2017
- Leinster Senior Hurling Championship (2): 2015, 2017
- National Hurling League (1): 2017
