= St Thomas' GAA =

GAA club in County Galway, Ireland

- CLG Naomh Thomais
- Founded: 1968
- County: Galway
- Nickname: The Toms
- Colours: Red and Blue
- Grounds: Páirc Thomáis Naofa, Castleboy
- Coordinates: 53.141277°N 8.705564°W

Playing kits
Home kit	Change kit

Senior Club Championships
	All Ireland	Connacht champions	Galway champions
Hurling:	2	-	8

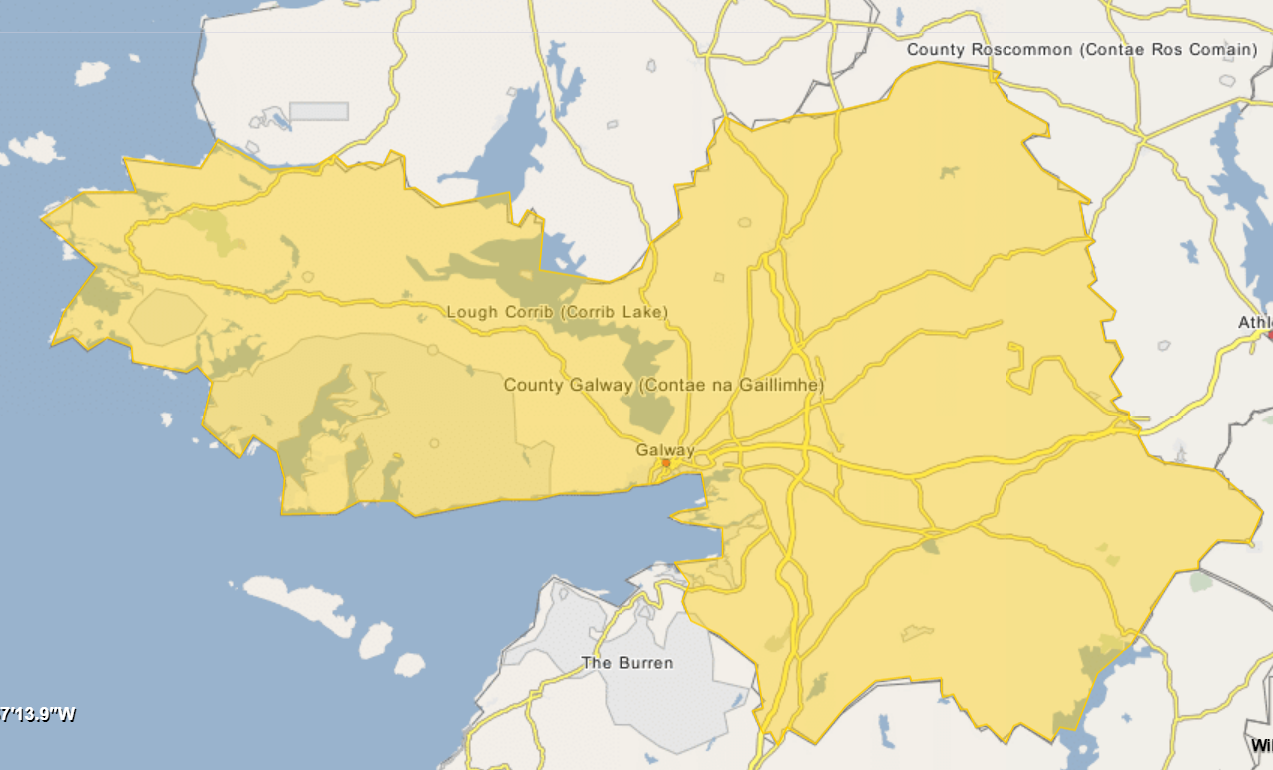
Location of St. Thomas' in County Galway; the club is located on the Loughrea–Gort road.

Saint Thomas' GAC is a GAA club located in the Kilchreest and Peterswell areas of County Galway, Ireland. The club is exclusively concerned with the game of hurling. They were All-Ireland Senior Club Hurling champions in 2024, defeating O'Loughlin Gaels of Kilkenny in the final in January of that year. This was their second championship victory, having first won the All-Ireland championship in 2013.

They won their first ever Galway senior hurling championship in 2012. In February 2013 they advanced to the final of the All-Ireland Senior Club Hurling Championship after a 0–15 to 0–7 win against Loughgiel Shamrocks. They beat Offaly side Kilcormac/Killoughey to win the All Ireland on Saint Patrick's Day 2013 in Croke Park. The club won the Galway senior hurling championship again in 2016 beating Gort in the final, and again in 2018 against Liam Mellows. They won it again in 2023, beating Turloughmore in the final.

== History ==
The club was formed in 1968 when Peterswell and Kilchreest amalgamated. Peterswell had enjoyed early success in the late 1800s and early 1900 with them winning the Galway Senior Hurling Championship title in 1889, 1898, 1899, 1900, 1904, 1905 and 1907. They were a major force in Galway GAA throughout this period. The club name derives from Thomas the Apostle, to whom the Catholic church in Peterswell is dedicated.

Both adjoining parishes were associated with hurling since its foundation but due to emigration and lack of numbers the parishes decided to amalgamate.

The first year in competitive hurling was a successful one. The under-14 team brought the club its first success by winning the county title. The team would follow this up by winning the county under-16 title in 1970.

Construction began on their current clubhouse which is located on the main Gort to Loughrea Road in 1976. That along with a brand new pitch were finally officially opened in 1983 by Paddy Buggy, President of the GAA.

In 1978 another milestone was reached when the club was promoted to senior ranks after reaching the county intermediate final, however they were defeated by close neighbours Kilbeacanty.

Following the promotion to senior ranks the club endured a chequered existence in senior hurling. Having been relegated on a number of occasions they secured promotion with Intermediate Championship victories in 1996 and 2004.

They were crowned Galway Senior Champions for the first time in 2012 by defeating Loughrea in the final on a scoreline of 3–11 to 2–11 in Pearse Stadium. They followed this up by taking the All-Ireland Senior Club Hurling Championship by defeating Kilcormac-Killoughy on St Patrick's Day. In 2016, the secured a second Galway Senior Hurling Championship by beating Gort in the final on a scoreline of 1–11 0–10.

== 2013 All Ireland victory ==
=== Path to county final ===
In the quarter-finals St Thomas' were 2–20 to 0–10 winners over Galway club Castlegar. Centre-forward Conor Cooney lead the way scoring 1–6 (6fs). In the semi-final St Thomas' met county champions Gort. St Thomas' led at half time however Gort rallied, scoring two late points to secure a replay. Gort's Aidan Harte scored the equalising point from a 65 in the third minute of additional time. They overcame Gort in the replay in Kenny Park Athenry. St Thomas' won their first senior county title in November 2012 defeating Loughrea in the final.

=== Semi-final ===
They faced Antrim side and Ulster Champions Loughgiel Shamrocks in the All Ireland semi-final in Parnell Park. St. Thomas' were leading by four points in injury time. However, Liam Watson tipped over a twenty-metre free and scored a goal from a free in the last puck of the dramatic game to secure a draw for Loughgiel. St Thomas' were victorious in the replay played in Clones, winning on a scoreline of 0–15 to 0–7.

=== All-Ireland final ===
St Thomas' won their first All-Ireland Club Championship title on 17 March 2013 after defeating Kilcormac-Killoughey of Offaly on a scoreline of 1–11 to 1–09.

== 2024 All Ireland victory ==
=== Semi-final ===
On 16 December 2023, the club reached a second All-Ireland Senior Club Hurling Championship final after defeating Ballygunner on penalties in the semi-final.

=== All-Ireland final ===
On 21 January 2024, St Thomas' won the final by 0-18 to 0-17 against O'Loughlin Gaels in Croke Park to win their second All-Ireland Senior Club Hurling Championship title. Éanna Burke scored the winning point for St. Thomas' in added time with an over the shoulder point from out on the left near the touchline at the hill 16 end. James Regan had been sent-off for St. Thomas' two minutes into the second half for a shoulder charge. O'Loughlin Gaels appeared to have scored a goal in the first half when a low shot from Owen Wall looked to have gone over the goal-line before being cleared by Fintan Burke.

== Hurling titles ==
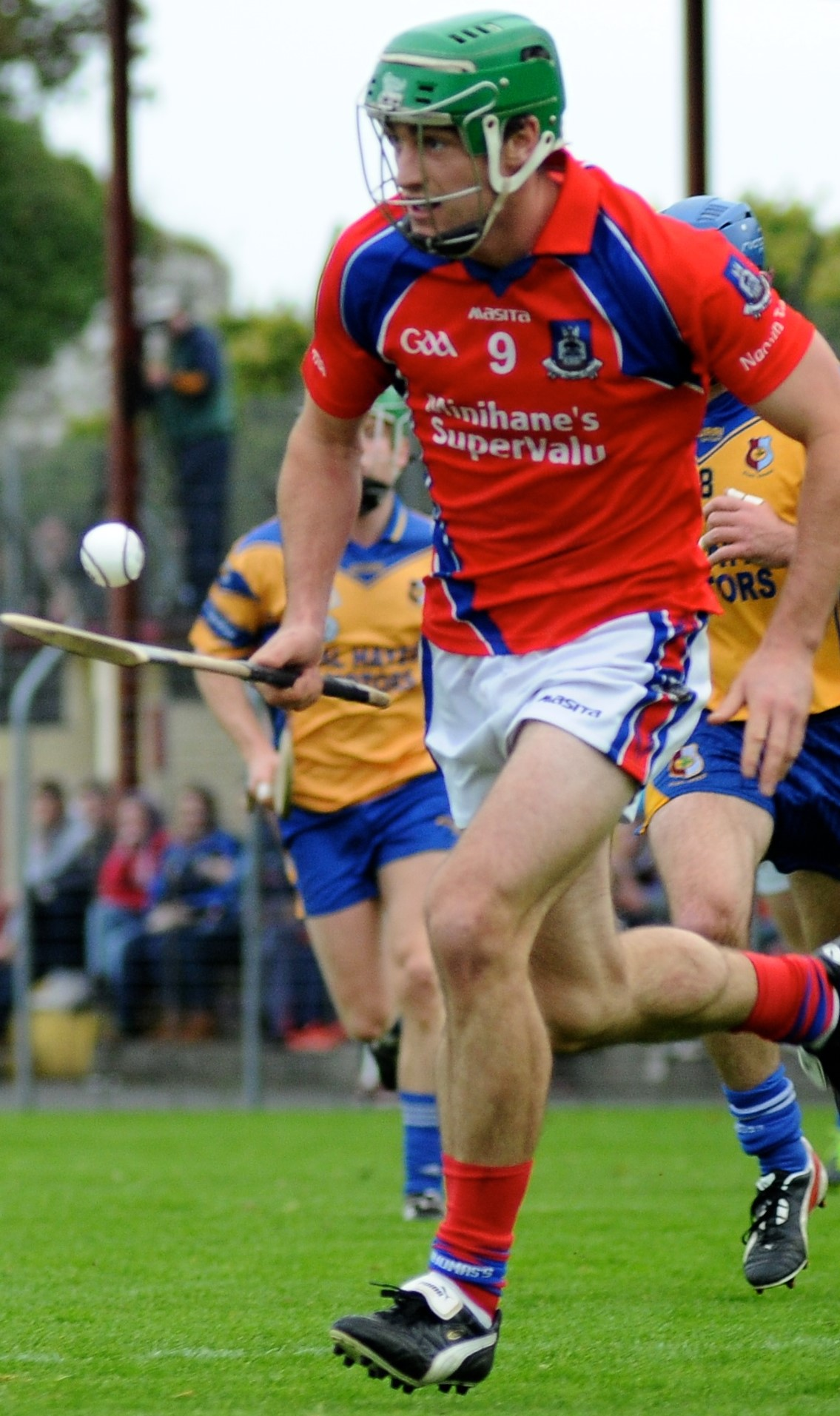
David Burke playing for St Thomas'

- All-Ireland Senior Club Hurling Championship (2): 2013, 2024
- Galway Senior Hurling Championship (8): 2012, 2016, 2018, 2019, 2020, 2021, 2022, 2023
- Galway Intermediate Hurling Championship (1): 2004
- Galway Junior Hurling Championship (1): 1972
- Galway Under-21 Hurling Championship (3): 1980, 1995, 2013
- Galway Minor Hurling Championship (1): 2008

== Notable hurlers ==
- Anthony Cunningham
- David Burke
- Kenneth Burke
- Conor Cooney
- James Regan
- Richie Murray
- Éanna Burke
