= 2012 Galway Senior Hurling Championship =

Annual hurling competition season

Tournament details
- County: Galway
- Year: 2012

Winners
- Champions: St. Thomas's (5th win)
- Manager: John Burke
- Captain: Robert Murray

Promotion/Relegation
- Promoted team(s): N/A
- Relegated team(s): N/A

The 2012 Galway Senior Hurling Championship was the 115th staging of the Galway Senior Hurling Championship since its establishment in 1887. The championship began on 28 April 2013 and ended on 18 November 2012. An otherwise entertaining game was made infamous by some unruly incidents most notably a stamping by one of the St Thomas' players Richie Murray where he was seen to stamp on the Loughrea full back and the infamous Johnny Maher striking incident which later became a YouTube sensation. Maher was subsequently suspended for eight weeks following the incidents in the match.

St. Thomas's were appearing in their first ever final having overcome reigning champions Gort 1–16 to 1–15 at the semi-final stage.

== Results ==
=== Semi-finals ===
28 October Semi-final	Loughrea	1-12 - 0-7	Turloughmore
	J Maher (0-7, 0-6 frees), K Colleran (1-0), Pa Hoban (0-2), S Sweeney (0-1, free), J O’Loughlin (0-1), N Keary (0-1)	[Report]	R Badger (0-3, all frees) C. Burke (0-1), M Keating (0-1) G Burke (0-1, 65); F Forde (0-1)	Referee: L Fay

28 October Semi-final	Gort	0-9 - 0-9	St. Thomas's
	C Cooney (0-5, 4 frees), Richard Murray (0-2), David Burke (0-1); J Regan (0-1).	[Report]	G. Quinn (0-7, 6 frees, 1 ‘65’), A Harte (0-1, a ‘65’), P Killilea (0-1).	Referee: J Keanw

4 November Semi-final replay	St. Thomas's	1-16 - 1-15	Gort	Athenry
	C Cooney (0-5, 4fs), R Murray (0-3), S Cooney (1-0), K Burke (0-2), David Burke (0-2); J Regan (0-2), B Burke (0-1).	Report	G Quinn (1-9, all frees), J Grealish (0-2), P Killilea (0-2), M Nestor (0-1); R Cummins (0-1).	Referee: Sean Moran

=== Final ===
18 November Final	St. Thomas's	3-11 - 2-11	Loughrea	Pearse Stadium
	Richie Murray 3-0, C Cooney 0-4 (0-2f), B Burke 0-3, D Burke 0-2, K Burke 0-1, J Regan 0-1.	Report	J Maher 2-2 (1-1 f, 1-0 pen), N Keary 0-6 (4f), G Keary 0-2, J O’Loughlin 0-1.	Referee: Eoin Shaughnessy (Craughwell)
Note: Deferred on TG4

St. Thomas':
1	P Skehill
2	S Skehill
3	R Murray (c)
4	C Burke
5	S Burke
6	Darragh Burke
7	E Tannion
8	K Burke
9	David Burke
12	J Regan
11	C Cooney
14	B Burke
15	G Murray
10	R Murray
13	A Kelly
Substitutes Used:
21	S Cooney for G Murray (35 mins)
20	E Burke for Kelly (50 mins)
Manager:
John Burke

Loughrea:
1	N Murray
2	Eoin Mahony
3	D McClearn
4	B Mahony
5	S Sweeney
6	Paul Hoban
7	J Coen
8	G Keary
9	Emmett Mahony
10	J O’Loughlin
11	V Maher
12	Patrick Hoban
13	N Keary
14	J Maher
15	K Colleran
Substitutes Used:
17	T Regan for Colleran (43 mins.)
18	J Ryan for Patrick Hoban (43 mins.)
19	J Dooley for Sweeney (50 mins.)
20	N Shaughnessy for Emmett Mahony (55 mins.).
Manager:
Eamon Kelly
