= 2020 Galway Senior Hurling Championship =

Annual hurling competition season

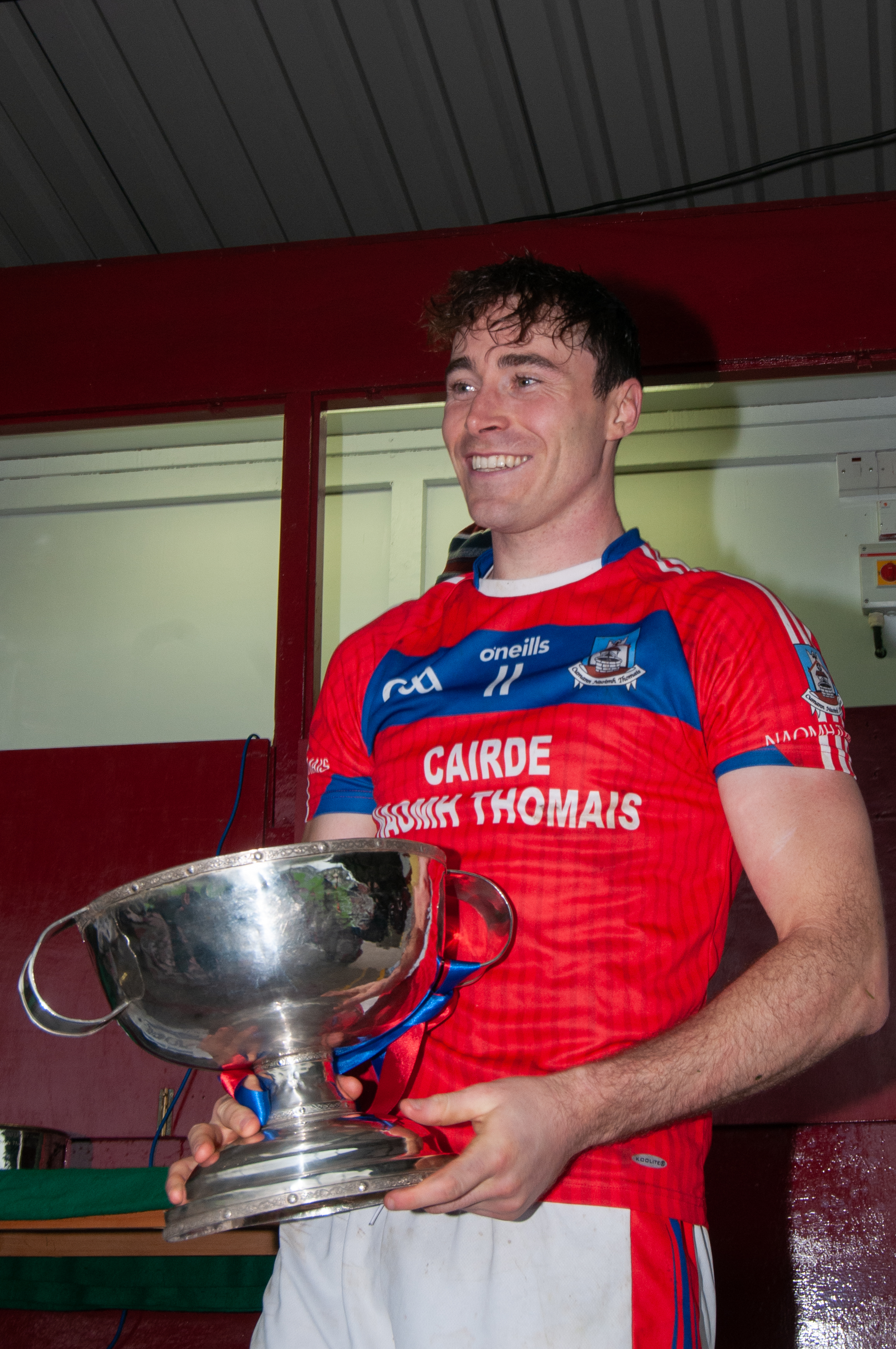

Tournament details
- County: Galway
- Year: 2020
- Sponsor: Brooks

Winners
- Champions: St. Thomas' (5th win)
- Manager: Kevin Lally
- Captain: Conor Cooney

Promotion/Relegation
- Relegated team(s): Kinvara

The 2020 Galway Senior Hurling Championship. was the 123rd staging of the Galway Senior Hurling Championship since its establishment in 1887. It was won by St. Thomas' for the third consecutive year and the fifth time in total. Kinvara participated in the senior championship having been promoted from the intermediate competition in 2019 but were subsequently relegated. The competition was sponsored by Brooks for 3 years starting in 2020.

== Competition format ==
Due to the COVID-19 pandemic in Ireland the initial draw was scrapped, the format was changed and the groupings redrawn on 29 June 2020.

Twenty four teams compete in the initial group stages of the championship – the top ranked twelve teams compete in the Senior A Group and the second ranked twelve teams compete in the Senior B Group. Eight teams from the Senior A Group and four teams from the Senior B Group progress to the knockout stage. The competition format is explained further in each of the championship rounds in the sections below.

== Group stage ==
=== Senior A ===
Senior A consists of 12 teams divided into three groups of 4 teams. The top teams from each group plus one drawn second team qualify for the quarter-finals. The remaining 2 second placed teams play in the preliminary quarter finals. The bottom team from each group will be relegated to playing in the following year's Senior B Section.

==== Senior A - Group 1 ====
| Pos | Team | Pld | W | D | L | SF | SA | Diff | Pts |
|---|---|---|---|---|---|---|---|---|---|
| 1 | Cappataggle | 3 | 2 | 0 | 1 | 5-43 | 3-42 | 7 | 4 |
| 2 | Loughrea | 3 | 2 | 0 | 1 | 4-47 | 4-42 | 5 | 4 |
| 3 | Tommy Larkin's | 3 | 2 | 0 | 1 | 2-39 | 0-40 | 5 | 4 |
| 4 | Tynagh/Abbey-Duniry | 3 | 0 | 0 | 2 | 4-38 | 8-43 | -17 | 0 |

- Loughrea were drawn from the second placed teams to go straight into the quarter-finals

| 24 July 2020; 19:00; Round 1 | Tommy Larkin's | 1-16 - 0-15 | Loughrea | Kenny Park, Athenry; Referee: John McDonagh |
| 24 July 2020; 19:00; Round 1 | Jason Flynn (0-8, 0-6 frees); Conor Gardiner (1-2); Ronan Murphy (0-3); Kevin McHugo (0-2); Darren Duggan (0-1) | | Jamie Ryan (0-8, 0-7 frees, 0-1 sideline); Johnny Coen, Anthony Burns (0-2); Neil Keary (0-2 frees); Joseph Mooney (0-1) | Kenny Park, Athenry; Referee: John McDonagh |

| 26 July 2020; 17:00; Round 1 | Cappataggle | 4-16 - 2-14 | Tynagh/Abbey-Duniry | Duggan Park, Ballinasloe; Referee: Ger O'Connor |
| 26 July 2020; 17:00; Round 1 | Niall Collins (2-2); Alan Dolan (0-7 frees); James Egan (1-1); Michael Garvey (1-0); Jarlath Mannion (0-3); Stephen Creaven (0-2); Darragh Dolan (0-1) | | Shane Moloney (0-10, 0-7 frees, 0-1 sideline); Thomas Gordon (2-0); David Jordan, John Whelan, Padraig Brehony, Ben Moran (0-1) | Duggan Park, Ballinasloe; Referee: Ger O'Connor |

| 9 August 2020; 13:00; Round 2 | Loughrea | 1-16 - 1-12 | Cappataggle | Duggan Park, Ballinasloe; Referee: Alan Kelly |
| 9 August 2020; 13:00; Round 2 | Jamie Ryan (0-8, 0-6 frees); Anthony Burns (1-4); Brian Keary, Emmet Mahoney, Neil Keary, Martin McManus (0-1) | | Alan Dolan (0-10 frees); Jarlath Mannion (1-1); James Egan (0-1) | Duggan Park, Ballinasloe; Referee: Alan Kelly |

| 9 August 2020; 17:00; Round 2 | Tommy Larkin's | 1-11 - 0-10 | Tynagh/Abbey-Duniry | Duggan Park, Ballinasloe; Referee: Seamus Moran |
| 9 August 2020; 17:00; Round 2 | Jason Flynn (0-7 frees); Ronan Murphy (1-1); Eanna Murphy (0-1 free); Colm Flynn, Conor Gardiner (0-1) | | Shane Maloney (0-4 frees); Niall Maloney (0-3); Paul Killeen, Thomas Gordon, Ben Moran (0-1) | Duggan Park, Ballinasloe; Referee: Seamus Moran |

| 22 August 2020; 18:00; Round 3 | Loughrea | 3-16 - 2-14 | Tynagh/Abbey-Duniry | Duggan Park, Ballinasloe; Referee: Shane Hynes |
| 22 August 2020; 18:00; Round 3 | Neil Keary (0-8, 0-5 frees, 0-2 '65s); Emmet Mahoney, Anthony Burns (1-1); Martin McManus (0-3); Shane O'Brien (1-0); Joseph Mooney (0-2), Dylan Shaughnessy (0-1) | | Shane Moloney (1-7, 0-6 frees); Padraig Brehony (1-0); Niall Moloney (0-3); Paul Killeen, Kevin Moloney, Ben Moran, Thomas Gordon (0-1) | Duggan Park, Ballinasloe; Referee: Shane Hynes |

| 22 August 2020; 18:00; Round 3 | Cappataggle | 0-15 - 0-12 | Tommy Larkin's | Kenny Park, Athenry; Referee: John Keane |
| 22 August 2020; 18:00; Round 3 | Alan Dolan (0-7, 0-5 frees); Dan Nevin (0-2 frees); Donal Mannion, Jarlath Mannion (0-2); Niall Collins, Eanna Garvey (0-1) | | Jason Flynn (0-10, 0-5 frees, 0-1 '65); Colm Flynn, Conor Gardiner (0-1) | Kenny Park, Athenry; Referee: John Keane |

==== Senior A - Group 2 ====
| Pos | Team | Pld | W | D | L | SF | SA | Diff | Pts |
|---|---|---|---|---|---|---|---|---|---|
| 1 | Turloughmore | 3 | 2 | 0 | 0 | 2-54 | 1-49 | 8 | 4 |
| 2 | Liam Mellows | 3 | 2 | 0 | 1 | 5-44 | 1-47 | 9 | 4 |
| 3 | Oranmore-Maree | 3 | 1 | 0 | 2 | 1-45 | 3-53 | -14 | 2 |
| 4 | Clarinbridge | 3 | 1 | 0 | 2 | 0-55 | 3-49 | -3 | 2 |

| 25 July 2020; 14:00; Round 1 | Turloughmore | 1-17 - 1-15 | Liam Mellows | Pearse Stadium; Referee: John Keane |
| 25 July 2020; 14:00; Round 1 | Conor Walsh (0-11, 0-9 frees, 0-1 '65); Barry Callanan (1-1); Sean Linnane (0-2); Jamie Holland (0-1 free); Diarmuid Mullen, Sean Loftus, Gary Burke (0-1) | | Tadhg Haran (1-11, 0-5 frees, 1-0 penalty, 0-2 '65s, 0-2 sidelines); Adrian Morrissey (0-2, 0-1 free); Sean Morrissey, Jack Forde, Jack Hastings, Aonghus Callanan (0-1) | Pearse Stadium; Referee: John Keane |

| 26 July 2020; 15:30; Round 1 | Oranmore-Maree | 1-17 - 0-19 | Clarinbridge | Pearse Stadium; Referee: Brian Keon |
| 26 July 2020; 15:30; Round 1 | Niall Burke (1-9, 0-7 frees); Conor Hanniffy (0-3); Mark Hanniffy (0-2); Eanna Burke, Ross Malone, Ronan Hanniffy (0-1) | | Evan Niland (0-15, 0-11 frees); Mikey Daly (0-1 sideline); Patrick Foley, Andrew Monaghan, Mark Kennedy (0-1) | Pearse Stadium; Referee: Brian Keon |

| 8 August 2020; 14:00; Round 2 | Turloughmore | 1-21 - 0-11 | Oranmore-Maree | Kenny Park, Athenry; Referee: Liam Gordon |
| 8 August 2020; 14:00; Round 2 | Conor Walsh (0-6 frees); Jamie Holland (0-4, 0-3 frees); Sean Linnane (0-4); Ronan Badger (1-0); Gary Burke (0-2); Daniel Loftus, Fergal Moore, Daithi Burke, Brion Connolly, Barry Callanan (0-1) | | Niall Burke (0-6 frees); Sean McInerney (0-2); Mark Hanniffy, Conor Hanniffy, Padriac Keane (0-1) | Kenny Park, Athenry; Referee: Liam Gordon |

| 8 August 2020; 18:00; Round 2 | Liam Mellows | 2-16 - 0-13 | Clarinbridge | Kenny Park, Athenry; Referee: Gerry Donoghue |
| 8 August 2020; 18:00; Round 2 | Taghg Haran (0-10, 0-8 frees, 0-1 '65); Aonghus Callanan (1-2); Conor Hynes (1-1); Adrian Morrissey, Jack Forde, Conor Kavanagh (0-1) | | Evan Niland (0-8, 0-6 frees, 0-1 '65); Sean Kilduff, TJ Brennan, Patrick Foley, Cian Salmon, Mark Kennedy (1-0) | Kenny Park, Athenry; Referee: Gerry Donoghue |

| 21 August 2020; 19:00; Round 3 | Clarinbridge | 0-23 - 0-16 | Turloughmore | Kenny Park, Athenry; Referee: Shane Curley |
| 21 August 2020; 19:00; Round 3 | Evan Niland (0-9, 0-5 frees); TJ Brennan (0-5, 0-1 sideline); Andrew Monaghan (0-3); Sean Kilduff (0-2); Alan Armstrong, Shane Ryan, Patrick Foley, Mikey Daly (0-1) | | Ronan Badger (0-5 frees); Matthew Keating (0-3); Conor Walsh (0-2 frees); Jamie Holland (0-1 free); Diarmuid Mullen, Daithi Burke, Barry McDonagh, Richard Doyle, Gary Burke (0-1) | Kenny Park, Athenry; Referee: Shane Curley |

| 23 August 2020; 17:00; Round 3 | Liam Mellows | 2-13 - 0-17 | Oranmore-Maree | Kenny Park, Athenry; Referee: John McDonagh |
| 23 August 2020; 17:00; Round 3 | Tadhg Haran (1-8, 1-6 frees, 1-0 penalty, 0-1 '65); Conor Hynes (1-0); Conor Kavanagh (0-2); Adrian Morrissey, Jack Forde, Aonghus Callanan (0-1) | | Niall Burke (0-11, 0-7 frees, 0-1 '65); Ross Malone (0-2, 0-1 sideline); Conor Hanniffy (0-2); Mark Hanniffy, Ronan Hanniffy (0-1) | Kenny Park, Athenry; Referee: John McDonagh |

==== Senior A - Group 3 ====
| Pos | Team | Pld | W | D | L | SF | SA | Diff | Pts |
|---|---|---|---|---|---|---|---|---|---|
| 1 | St. Thomas' | 3 | 3 | 0 | 0 | 6-83 | 4-51 | 38 | 6 |
| 2 | Sarsfields | 3 | 1 | 0 | 1 | 8-51 | 0-59 | 16 | 4 |
| 3 | Castlegar | 3 | 1 | 0 | 1 | 7-58 | 6-52 | 9 | 2 |
| 4 | Portumna | 3 | 0 | 0 | 2 | 1-51 | 12-81 | -63 | 0 |

| 25 July 2020; 18:00; Round 1 | St. Thomas' | 2-23 - 3-18 | Castlegar | Pearse Stadium; Referee: Alan Kelly |
| 25 July 2020; 18:00; Round 1 | Conor Cooney (1-8, 0-6 frees, 0-1 '65); Eanna Burke (1-2); Oisin Flannery (0-4); Brendan Farrell (0-3); Darragh Burke (0-2, 0-1 free); David Sherry, Fintan Burke, David Burke, Damien McGlynn (0-1) | | Oisin Connolly (2-3); Ger Farragher (0-8, 0-7 frees); Dean Higgins (0-3); Enda Concannon (1-0); Jack Coyne (0-2); Cillian Callaghan, Jason O'Gorman (0-1) | Pearse Stadium; Referee: Alan Kelly |

| 26 July 2020; 14:30; Round 1 | Sarsfields | 4-22 - 0-18 | Portumna | Kenny Park, Athenry; Referee: Shane Hynes |
| 26 July 2020; 14:30; Round 1 | Kevin Cooney (1-7, 0-5 frees, 1-0 penalty, 0-1 '65); Jeffrey Lawless (2-2); Joseph Cooney (1-3); Alex Connaire (0-3); Ian Fox, Ian Skehill (0-2); Niall Morrissey, Eric Kenny, Mark O'Regan (0-1) | | Joe Canning (0-9 frees); Ronan O'Meara (0-6); Neil Connelly, Andrew Smith, Adam Fogarty (0-1) | Kenny Park, Athenry; Referee: Shane Hynes |

| 7 August 2020; 19:00; Round 2 | St. Thomas' | 0-22 - 1-18 | Sarsfields | Kenny Park, Athenry; Referee: John Keane |
| 7 August 2020; 19:00; Round 2 | Conor Cooney (0-14, 0-13 frees); Evan Duggan, Eanna Burke, Oisin Flannery (0-2); James Regan, Brendan Farrell (0-1) | | Kevin Cooney (0-11, 0-10 frees, 0-1 sideline); Mark O'Regan (1-0); Darren Skehill, Darren Morrissey, Niall Morrissey, Ian Skehill, Eric Kenny, Alan Ward, John Cooney (0-1) | Kenny Park, Athenry; Referee: John Keane |

| 8 August 2020; 14:00; Round 2 | Castlegar | 4-21 - 1-18 | Portumna | Loughrea; Referee: John McDonagh |
| 8 August 2020; 14:00; Round 2 | Jack Coyne (1-5); Dean Higgins (1-2); Cillian Callaghan (0-5); Sean Neary, Enda Concannon (1-0); Ger Farragher (0-3, 0-1 free); Mark Gill, Oisin Connolly (0-2); Simon Thomas, Jason O'Gorman (0-1) | | Joe Canning (1-12, 1-6 frees, 0-3 '65s); Neil Conneely (0-2); Conor Goode, Sean Tuohy, Declan McLaughlin, David O'Meara (0-1) | Loughrea; Referee: John McDonagh |

| 21 August 2020; 19:00; Round 3 | St. Thomas' | 4-38 - 0-15 | Portumna | Loughrea; Referee: Noel Quinn |
| 21 August 2020; 19:00; Round 3 | Conor Cooney (1-14, 0-5 frees); Eanna Burke (0-9); Darragh Burke (1-3); David Burke (1-1); Evan Duggan, Damien McGlynn (0-3); Oisin Flannery (1-0); Shane Cooney (0-2); Sean Skehill, Bernard Burke, Damien Finnerty (0-1) | | Joe Canning (0-10, 0-6 frees); Adam Fogarty (0-2); Jack Canning (0-1 free); Neil Connelly, Ronan O'Meara (0-1) | Loughrea; Referee: Noel Quinn |

| 22 August 2020; 14:00; Round 3 | Sarsfields | 3-11 - 0-19 | Castlegar | Kenny Park, Athenry; Referee: Liam Gordon |
| 22 August 2020; 14:00; Round 3 | Niall Morrissey (0-10, 0-9 frees); Kevin Cooney (2-0, 1-0 free); Alex Connaire (1-0); Ian Fox (0-1) | | Ger Farragher (0-13, 0-11 frees); Oisin Connolly (0-2); Mark Gill, Jason O’Gorman, Dean Higgins, Owen Teagle (0-1) | Kenny Park, Athenry; Referee: Liam Gordon |

=== Senior B ===
Senior B consists of 12 teams divided into three groups of 4. The top two teams in each group qualify for the 2020 preliminary quarter finals and compete in the following year's Senior A competition. The bottom placed teams in each group enter the relegation playoffs.

==== Senior B - Group 1 ====
| Pos | Team | Pld | W | D | L | SF | SA | Diff | Pts |
|---|---|---|---|---|---|---|---|---|---|
| 1 | Craughwell | 3 | 2 | 1 | 0 | 7-63 | 7-38 | 25 | 5 |
| 2 | Gort | 3 | 2 | 1 | 0 | 4-55 | 0-42 | 25 | 5 |
| 3 | Ballinderreen | 3 | 1 | 0 | 2 | 6-37 | 6-56 | -19 | 2 |
| 4 | Kinvara | 3 | 0 | 0 | 3 | 4-39 | 8-58 | -31 | 0 |

- Craughwell top the group on "Scores for"

| 25 July 2020; 14:00; Round 1 | Ballinderreen | 2-15 - 2-12 | Kinvara | Kenny Park, Athenry; Referee: Karol Collins |
| 25 July 2020; 14:00; Round 1 | Roy Lane (1-4, 0-3 frees); Niall Coen (0-5, 0-2 frees); Luke Prendergast (1-1); Shane Larkin, Kieran Ryan (0-2); Kevin Lane (0-1) | | Conor Whelan (1-8, 1-5 frees); Tom O'Donovan (1-1); Colm Callanan (0-2 frees); James O'Hara (0-1) | Kenny Park, Athenry; Referee: Karol Collins |

| 30 July 2020; 17:00; Round 1 | Craughwell | 0-17 - 1-14 | Gort | Kenny Park, Athenry; Referee: Gerry Donoghue |
| 30 July 2020; 17:00; Round 1 | Niall Healy (0-10, 0-9 frees); Adrian Prendergast, Thomas Monaghan (0-2); Jamie Ryan, Shane Dolan, Dean Callanan (0-1) | | Aiden Helebert (0-10 frees); Greg Lally (1-0 penalty); Ronan Burke (0-2); Paddy Commins, Paul Killilea (0-1) | Kenny Park, Athenry; Referee: Gerry Donoghue |

| 9 August 2020; 13:00; Round 2 | Gort | 1-21 - 0-14 | Kinvara | Pearse Stadium; Referee: Conor Quinlan |
| 9 August 2020; 13:00; Round 2 | Aiden Helebert (0-14, 0-8 frees); Gerard O'Donoghue (1-0); Greg Lally (0-2, 0-1 free, 0-1 '65); Paddy Commins (0-2); Jason O'Donoghue, Jason Grealish, Richie Cummins (0-1) | | Conor Whelan (0-5, 0-4 frees); Colm Callanan (0-3, 0-2 frees, 0-1 '65); Shane Kavanagh, David Burke, Conor Burke, Jake Comyn, Barry Britton, Eanna Linnane (0-1) | Pearse Stadium; Referee: Conor Quinlan |

| 9 August 2020; 17:00; Round 2 | Craughwell | 2-24 - 4-11 | Ballinderreen | Pearse Stadium |
| 9 August 2020; 17:00; Round 2 | Niall Healy (0-10, 0-7 frees); Jamie Ryan (2-2); Adrian Prendergast (0-4); Thomas Monaghan (0-3); Dean Callanan (0-2); Gerard O’Halloran, Patrick Monaghan, Shane Dolan (0-1) | | Roy Lane (3-2, 1-0 penalty, 1-1 frees); Kevin Lane (1-3); Niall Coen (0-5, 0-2 frees); David O'Connor (0-1) | Pearse Stadium |

| 23 August 2020; 13:00; Round 3 | Craughwell | 5-22 - 2-13 | Kinvara | Pearse Stadium; Referee: Paul Fahy |
| 23 August 2020; 13:00; Round 3 | Niall Healy (1-10, 0-7 frees); Patrick Monaghan (2-2); Thomas Monaghan (1-3); Adam Clarke (1-0); Jamie Ryan (0-3); Shane Dolan (0-2); Dean Callanan, Gerard O’Halloran (0-1) | | Conor Whelan (1-5, 1-3 frees); Colm Callanan (0-3 frees); James O'Hara (0-2); Shane Kavanagh, Conor Burke, David Burke, Tom O’Donovan (0-1) | Pearse Stadium; Referee: Paul Fahy |

| 23 August 2020; 13:00; Round 3 | Gort | 2-20 - 0-11 | Ballinderreen | Kenny Park, Athenry; Referee: Derek Kelly |
| 23 August 2020; 13:00; Round 3 | Aiden Helebert (0-8, 0-7 frees, 0-1 '65); Richard Cummins (1-4); Greg Lally (0-3, 0-2 frees); Mike Mullins (1-0); Paddy Commins (0-2); Jack Grealish, Jason O’Donoghue, Gerard O’Donoghue (0-1) | | Roy Lane (0-4, 0-1 '65, 0-1 sideline); Shane Larkin (0-3), Sean Meehan, Luke Prendergast, David O’Connor (0-1); Kevin Lane (0-1 free) | Kenny Park, Athenry; Referee: Derek Kelly |

==== Senior B - Group 2 ====
| Pos | Team | Pld | W | D | L | SF | SA | Diff | Pts |
|---|---|---|---|---|---|---|---|---|---|
| 1 | Killimordaly | 3 | 2 | 0 | 1 | 5-51 | 2-46 | 14 | 4 |
| 2 | Ardrahan | 3 | 2 | 0 | 1 | 5-34 | 1-44 | 2 | 4 |
| 3 | Athenry | 3 | 1 | 1 | 1 | 1-57 | 5-47 | -2 | 3 |
| 4 | Beagh | 3 | 0 | 1 | 2 | 0-42 | 3-47 | -14 | 1 |

| 25 July 2020; 14:00; Round 1 | Athenry | 1-16 - 0-19 | Beagh | Loughrea; Referee: Derek Kelly |
| 25 July 2020; 14:00; Round 1 | Cian Burke (1-6, 1-4 frees, 0-1 '65); Paddy Rabbitte, Ronan Hardiman (0-2); John Grealish (0-1 free), Eoin Lawless, James Divilly, Noel Keogh, Cillian Lawless, Ciaran O'Dwyer (0-1) | | Evan Hunt (0-7, 0-3 frees); Rory Gantley (0-4 frees); Joe Gantley, Padraigh Landers (0-2); Kevin Keehan (0-2 frees); Stephen Diviney (0-1 free); Connell Keane (0-1) | Loughrea; Referee: Derek Kelly |

| 25 July 2020; 18:00; Round 1 | Killimordaly | 1-16 - 2-10 | Ardrahan | Kenny Park, Athenry; Referee: Paul Fahy |
| 25 July 2020; 18:00; Round 1 | Brian Burke (1-8, 0-6 frees); David Earls, Iomar Creaven (0-2); Eanna Ryan, Luke Lynskey, Brian Concannon, Tommy Earls (0-1) | | Ciaran Fahy (1-5, 0-3 frees); Darrach Fahy (1-0 penalty); Sean Gardiner (0-2); Stephen Whelan, Ross Albertini, Ian Lynskey (0-1) | Kenny Park, Athenry; Referee: Paul Fahy |

| 8 August 2020; 14:00; Round 2 | Ardrahan | 3-12 - 0-18 | Athenry | Pearse Stadium; Referee: Conor Quinlan |
| 8 August 2020; 14:00; Round 2 | Cianan Fahy (2-3); Darrach Fahy (0-4 frees); Liam Forde (1-0); Sean Gardiner (0-2 frees); Ross Albertini (0-2); Iarla Tannian (0-1) | | Cian Burke (0-11, 0-9); Martin Cullen, Eoin Caulfield (0-2); Mark Hannon, Cillian Lawless, Paddy Rabbitte (0-1) | Pearse Stadium; Referee: Conor Quinlan |

| 8 August 2020; 18:00; Round 2 | Killimordaly | 2-19 - 0-13 | Beagh | Pearse Stadium; Referee: Karol Collins |
| 8 August 2020; 18:00; Round 2 | Brian Burke (0-12, 0-6 frees); David Earls (1-1); Brian Concannon (1-0); Luke Lynskey, Tommy Earls (0-2); Eanna Ryan, Iomar Creaven (0-1) | | Rory Gantley (0-7, 0-6 frees, 0-1 '65); Joe Gantley (0-3); Connell Keane, Evan Hunt, Adrian Tuohey (0-1) | Pearse Stadium; Referee: Karol Collins |

| 22 August 2020; 14:30; Round 3 | Athenry | 0-23 - 2-16 | Killimordaly | Duggan Park, Ballinasloe; Referee: Gerry Donoghue |
| 22 August 2020; 14:30; Round 3 | Cian Burke (0-13, 0-11 frees); Ronan Hardiman (0-3); Paddy Rabbitte (0-2); Paddy Hannon, Noel Keogh, Ciarán O'Dwyer, Eoin Caulfield, Cillian Lawless (0-1) | | Brian Burke (2-7, 0-6 frees); David Earls (0-3); Brian Concannon (0-2); Adam Brett, David Concannon, Eanna Ryan, Darragh Cooney (0-1) | Duggan Park, Ballinasloe; Referee: Gerry Donoghue |

| 22 August 2020; 14:30; Round 3 | Ardrahan | 0-12 - 0-10 | Beagh | Pearse Stadium; Referee: Brian Keon |
| 22 August 2020; 14:30; Round 3 | Sean Gardiner (0-4, 0-3 frees, 0-1 '65); Darrach Fahy (0-3, 0-1 free, 0-1 '65); Ross Albertini (0-3); Eoin O Donnell, Iarla Tannian (0-1) | | Rory Gantley (0-2 frees); Padraigh Landers, Joe Gantley, John Moylan (0-2); Eoin Mahon, Evan Hunt (0-1) | Pearse Stadium; Referee: Brian Keon |

==== Senior B - Group 3 ====
| Pos | Team | Pld | W | D | L | SF | SA | Diff | Pts |
|---|---|---|---|---|---|---|---|---|---|
| 1 | Ahascragh-Fohenagh | 3 | 3 | 0 | 0 | 6-54 | 3-51 | 12 | 6 |
| 2 | Mullagh | 3 | 2 | 0 | 1 | 3-54 | 4-44 | 7 | 4 |
| 3 | Padraig Pearses | 3 | 1 | 0 | 2 | 4-40 | 2-52 | -6 | 2 |
| 4 | Kilnadeema-Leitrim | 3 | 0 | 0 | 3 | 2-52 | 6-53 | -13 | 0 |

| 25 July 2020; 14:00; Round 1 | Mullagh | 1-22 - 1-14 | Kilnadeema-Leitrim | Duggan Park, Ballinasloe; Referee: Liam Gordon |
| 25 July 2020; 14:00; Round 1 | Cathal Dervan (0-8 frees); Davy Glennon (0-5); Ronan Glennon (0-3, 0-1 sideline); Finnian Coone (1-0); Keith Coen (0-2); Sean Hardiman, Sean O'Brien, Justin Gaynor, Ronan Mitchell (0-1) | | Brian Molloy (1-7, 0-5 frees, 0-2 '65, 1-0 penalty); Jack Kenny (0-3); Niall Broderick (0-2); Stephen Molloy, Liam Kelly (0-1) | Duggan Park, Ballinasloe; Referee: Liam Gordon |

| 25 July 2020; 18:00; Round 1 | Ahascragh-Fohenagh | 1-19 - 1-14 | Padraig Pearses | Duggan Park, Ballinasloe; Referee: Seamus Moran |
| 25 July 2020; 18:00; Round 1 | Mark Kelly (0-8, 0-5 frees, 0-1 '65); Noel Ward (1-1); Padraig Mannion (0-3); Cathal Mannion, Ross Hannon (0-2); Sean Bleahene, Darragh Glynn, Ronan Kelly (0-1) | | Oisin Flannery (0-7 frees); Tomas Flannery (1-0 free); Cormac Ward (0-2, 0-1 free); Colm Raftery (0-1 '65); Conor Fahy, Damien Wynne, Sean Hardiman (0-1); Eric Ward (0-1 free) | Duggan Park, Ballinasloe; Referee: Seamus Moran |

| 8 August 2020; 18:00; Round 2 | Mullagh | 1-14 - 0-15 | Padraig Pearses | Loughrea; Referee: Brian Keon |
| 8 August 2020; 18:00; Round 2 | Cathal Dervan (0-9, 0-7 frees, 0-2 '65s); Sean Callanan (1-0); Ronan Glennon (0-2, 0-1 '65); Davy Glennon (0-2); Keith Coen (1-0) | | Eric Ward (0-7, 0-6 frees); Ronan Bellew (0-4); Gary Lally (0-2); Dean Reilly, Tomas Flannery (0-1) | Loughrea; Referee: Brian Keon |

| 9 August 2020; 17:00; Round 2 | Ahascragh-Fohenagh | 2-20 - 1-19 | Kilnadeema-Leitrim | Loughrea; Referee: Peter Murphy |
| 9 August 2020; 17:00; Round 2 | Cathal Mannion (1-4, 0-3 frees); Mark Kelly (0-7, 0-5 frees); Padraic Mannion (0-3); John Finnerty (1-0); Ronan Kelly, Ross Hannon (0-2); Noel Warde, Niall Glynn (0-1) | | Brian Molloy (1-12, 0-7 frees, 0-2 '65, 0-1 sideline); Jack Kenny (0-3); Niall Broderick, Michael Lynch (0-2) | Loughrea; Referee: Peter Murphy |

| 21 August 2020; 19:00; Round 3 | Ahascragh-Fohenagh | 3-15 - 1-18 | Mullagh | Duggan Park, Ballinasloe; Referee: Paul Fahy |
| 21 August 2020; 19:00; Round 3 | Mark Kelly (0-9, 0-6 frees); Padraic Mannion (1-2); John Finnerty, Niall Glynn (1-0); Cathal Mannion (0-2, 0-1 free); Eoghain Delaney, Ronan Kelly (0-1) | | Cathal DervanR(1-6, 0-4 frees); Ronan Glennon (0-4 frees); Davy Glennon (0-4); Sean Hardiman, Cathal Hardiman, Keith Coen, Ronan Mitchell (0-1) | Duggan Park, Ballinasloe; Referee: Paul Fahy |

| 23 August 2020; 13:30; Round 3 | Padraig Pearses | 3-11 - 0-19 | Kilnadeema-Leitrim | Duggan Park, Ballinasloe; Referee: Conor Quinlan |
| 23 August 2020; 13:30; Round 3 | Emmet Ward (0-6, 0-5 frees); Dean Reilly (2-0); Tomas Flannery (1-0); Mark Hennelly (0-3); Cyril Donnellan (0-2) | | Brian Molloy (0-8, 0-6 frees); Alvin Mitchell (0-3); Stephen Molloy, Jack Kenny, Kevin Roche (0-2); Michael Lynch, Liam Kelly (0-1) | Duggan Park, Ballinasloe; Referee: Conor Quinlan |

== Senior Relegation ==
| Pos | Team | Pld | W | D | L | SF | SA | Diff | Pts |
|---|---|---|---|---|---|---|---|---|---|
| 1 | Beagh | 2 | 1 | 0 | 1 | 4-28 | 1-35 | 2 | 2 |
| 2 | Kilnadeema-Leitrim | 2 | 1 | 0 | 1 | 1-36 | 2-31 | 2 | 2 |
| 3 | Kinvara | 2 | 1 | 0 | 1 | 2-29 | 4-27 | -4 | 2 |

- Beagh top the group on "score for"

| 29 August 2020; 18:00; Relegation Round 1 | Kilnadeema-Leitrim | 0-22 - 1-15 | Beagh | Duggan Park, Ballinasloe; Referee: Conor Quinlan |
| 29 August 2020; 18:00; Relegation Round 1 | Brian Molloy (0-11, 0-5 frees, 0-2 '65s); Liam Kelly (0-3); Michael Lynch, Kevin Roche (0-2); Stephen Molloy, Alvin Mitchell, Niall Broderick, Conor Molloy (0-1) | | Kevin Keehan (0-7 frees); John Moylan (1-2); Evan Hunt, Rory Gantley (0-2); Tommy McKeown, Joe Gantley (0-1) | Duggan Park, Ballinasloe; Referee: Conor Quinlan |

| 6 September 2020; 15:00; Relegation Round 2 | Kinvara | 1-16 - 1-14 | Kilnadeema-Leitrim | Loughrea; Referee: Seamus Moran |
| 6 September 2020; 15:00; Relegation Round 2 | Conor Whelan (0-7, 0-5 frees); Niall Bermingham (0-3); Tom O’Donovan (1-0); Colm Callanan (0-2 frees); David Burke (0-2); Shane Kavanagh, James O’Hara (0-1) | | Liam Kelly (0-5, 0-3 frees); Jack Kenny (1-1); Conor Molloy (0-3 frees); Vinnie Kenny (0-2); Stephen Roche, Brian Molloy (0-1 free); Tom Tierney (0-1) | Loughrea; Referee: Seamus Moran |

| 12 September 2020; 14:00; Relegation Round 3 | Beagh | 3-13 - 1-13 | Kinvara | Kenny Park, Athenry; Referee: Liam Gordon |
| 12 September 2020; 14:00; Relegation Round 3 | Padraic Landers (2-3); Rory Gantley (0-5, 0-1 free, 0-1 '65); Joe Gantley (1-1); Evan Hunt (0-2); John Moylan (0-1); Kevin Keehan (0-1 free) | | Conor Whelan (1-11, 0-8 frees); Colm Callanan (0-1 free); Ger Mahon (0-1) | Kenny Park, Athenry; Referee: Liam Gordon |

=== Senior Relegation Playoff ===
| 15 August 2021; 14:00; Relegation Play-off | Kilnadeema-Leitrim | 2-20 - 1-14 | Kinvara | Kenny Park, Athenry |

== Senior Knockout stage ==
=== Senior Preliminary Quarter-finals ===
| 29 August 2020; 13:00; Preliminary Quarter-final | Killimordaly | 0-25 - 1-18 | Mullagh | Kenny Park, Athenry; Referee: John Keane |
| 29 August 2020; 13:00; Preliminary Quarter-final | Brian Burke (0-11, 0-7 frees, 0-1 '65); Brian Concannon (0-5); Paul Creaven (0-3); Luke Lynskey (0-2); Jack Fitzpatrick, David Earls, Tommy Earls, Daren Daly (0-1) | | Cathal Dervan (0-10, 0-9 frees); Ronan Glennon (0-3, 0-2 frees); Cathal Conway (1-0); Sean Hardiman (0-2); Cathal Hardiman, Davy Glennon, Conor Hardiman (0-1) | Kenny Park, Athenry; Referee: John Keane |

| 29 August 2020; 16:00; Preliminary Quarter-final | Sarsfields | 4-17 - 0-19 | Ardrahan | Kenny Park, Athenry; Referee: Gerry Donoghue |
| 29 August 2020; 16:00; Preliminary Quarter-final | Niall Morrissey (1-6, 0-5 frees); Ian Fox (1-3); Ian Skehill (1-2); Mark O'Regan (1-0); Kevin Cooney (0-2 sidelines); Ronan Quinn, John Cooney, Alex Connaire, Jeffrey Lawless (0-1) | | Sean Gardiner (0-7 frees); Pearse McCrann, Iarla Tannian (0-3); Eoin O'Donnell, Darrach Fahy, Ross Albertini, Liam Forde, Cian Walsh (0-1); Cianan Fahy (0-1 free) | Kenny Park, Athenry; Referee: Gerry Donoghue |

| 30 August 2020; 15:00; Preliminary Quarter-final | Liam Mellows | 2-19 - 1-21 | Gort | Kenny Park, Athenry; Referee: Liam Gordon |
| 30 August 2020; 15:00; Preliminary Quarter-final | Tadhg Haran (0-6, 0-4 frees); Adrian Morrissey, Jack Forde (0-4); Aonghus Callanan (1-1); Conor Kavanagh (1-0); Mark Hughes, Sean Morrissey, Jack Hastings, Conor Hynes (0-1) | | Aiden Helebert (0-12, 0-7 frees, 0-1 sideline); Richard Cummins (0-4); Gerard O'Donoghue (1-1); Jason Grealish (0-2); Mike Mullins, Kevin Killilea (0-1) | Kenny Park, Athenry; Referee: Liam Gordon |

| 30 August 2020; 18:00; Preliminary Quarter-final | Ahascragh-Fohenagh | 2-18 - 2-17 | Craughwell | Kenny Park, Athenry; Referee: Shane Hynes |
| 30 August 2020; 18:00; Preliminary Quarter-final | Mark Kelly (0-7, 0-4 frees); Padraic Mannion (1-3); Cathal Mannion (0-4, 0-3 frees); John Finnerty (1-1); Sean Bleahene, Ronan Kelly, Ross Hannon (0-1) | | Niall Healy (0-8 frees); Jamie Ryan, Thomas Monaghan (1-1); Dean Callanan, Shane Dolan (0-2); Gerard O'Halloran, Adrian Prendergast, Adam Clarke (0-1) | Kenny Park, Athenry; Referee: Shane Hynes |

=== Senior Quarter-finals ===
The three teams who finished first in the Senior A groups and one of the second placed teams (drawn at random) will play the four winners of the senior preliminary quarter finals.

| 5 September 2020; 14:30; Quarter-final | St. Thomas' | 1-23 - 2-16 | Killimordaly | Duggan Park, Ballinasloe; Referee: Paul Fahy |
| 5 September 2020; 14:30; Quarter-final | Conor Cooney (0-8, 0-6 frees); Eanna Burke (0-6); Oisin Flannery (1-1); David Burke (0-3); Darragh Burke, Bernard Burke (0-2); James Regan (0-1) | | David Concannon (1-2); Jack Fitzpatrick (1-0); Tommy Earls (0-3); Brian Burke (0-3, 0-2 frees); Eanna Ryan, Paul Creaven, Brian Concannon (0-2); David Earls, Daren Daly (0-1) | Duggan Park, Ballinasloe; Referee: Paul Fahy |

| 5 September 2020; 17:30; Quarter-final | Cappataggle | 0-20 - 0-13 | Ahascragh-Fohenagh | Duggan Park, Ballinasloe; Referee: John McDonagh |
| 5 September 2020; 17:30; Quarter-final | Alan Dolan (0-10, 0-4 frees, 0-4 '65s); Jarlath Mannion (0-4); Donal Mannion (0-2); Eanna Garvey, Niall Collins, James Egan (0-1); Steven Creaven (0-1 '65) | | Mark Kelly (0-5, 0-4 frees); Cathal Mannion, Ronan Kelly, Padraic Mannion (0-2); Luke Cosgrove, John Finnerty (0-1) | Duggan Park, Ballinasloe; Referee: John McDonagh |

| 6 September 2020; 14:30; Quarter-final | Loughrea | 0-22 - 1-13 | Liam Mellows | Kenny Park, Athenry; Referee: Conor Quinlan |
| 6 September 2020; 14:30; Quarter-final | Neil Keary (0-8, 0-5 frees); Martin MacManus (0-5); Caimin Killeen, Emmet Mahoney, Joseph Mooney (0-2); Paul Hoban, Dylan Shaughnessy, Brian Keary (0-1) | | Tadhg Harnan (1-7, 0-7 frees); Conor Hynes (0-3); Conor Elwood (0-2); Adrian Morrissey (0-1) | Kenny Park, Athenry; Referee: Conor Quinlan |

| 6 September 2020; 17:30; Quarter-final | Turloughmore | 2-25 - 2-19 | Sarsfields | Kenny Park, Athenry; Referee: Alan Kelly |
| 6 September 2020; 17:30; Quarter-final | Conor Walsh (1-5, 0-5 frees); Sean Loftus (1-4); Sean Linnane (0-7); Daithi Burke, Barry Callanan (0-2); Daniel Loftus, Jamie Holland, Kevin Hussey, Matthew Keating, Brion Connolly (0-1) | | Kevin Cooney (1-4, 0-1 penalty, 0-1 sideline, 0-1 free); Ian Fox (1-4); Niall Morrissey (0-6 frees); Mark O'Regan (0-2); Kevin Hynes, Alex Connaire, Jeffrey Lawless (0-1) | Kenny Park, Athenry; Referee: Alan Kelly |

=== Senior Semi-finals ===
| 20 September 2020; 16:30; Semi-final | Turloughmore | 2-17 - 1-17 | Loughrea | Pearse Stadium; Referee: John Keane |
| 20 September 2020; 16:30; Semi-final | Conor Walsh (0-8, 0-5 frees, 0-1 '65); Barry Callanan (1-3); Gary Burke (1-0); Jamie Holland (0-2, 0-1 free); Daniel Loftus, Daithi Burke, Matthew Keating, Sean Linnane (0-1) | Report | Neil Keary (0-8, 0-7 frees); Joseph Mooney (1-2); Jamie Ryan (0-4, 0-1 sideline); Emmet Mahoney (0-2); Paul Hoban (0-1 free) | Pearse Stadium; Referee: John Keane |

| 27 September 2020; 15:00; Semi-final | St. Thomas' | 1-15 - 0-17 | Cappataggle | Kenny Park, Athenry; Referee: Liam Gordon |
| 27 September 2020; 15:00; Semi-final | Conor Cooney (0-5, 0-3 frees, 0-1 '65); Eanna Burke (1-0); Oisin Flannery (0-3); John Headd, James Regan, Darragh Burke (0-2); David Burke (0-1) | Report | Alan Dolan (0-6 frees); Jarlath Mannion (0-4), Donal Mannion, Damien Joyce, Niall Collins, Oran Finn (0-1); Dan Nevin (0-1 sideline); James Skehill, Steven Creaven (0-1 free) | Kenny Park, Athenry; Referee: Liam Gordon |

=== Senior final ===
| 4 October 2020; 14:00; Final | Turloughmore | 0-15 - 1-14 | St. Thomas' | Kenny Park, Athenry; Attendance: 200; Referee: Alan Kelly |
| 4 October 2020; 14:00; Final | Seán Linnane (0-4); Conor Walsh (0-4 frees); Fergal Moore, Matthew Keating (0-2); Gary Burke, Barry Callanan, Seán Loftus (0-1) | Report | Conor Cooney (1-6, 0-6 frees); Oisín Flannery (0-3); Darragh Burke, James Regan, Éanna Burke, Brendan Farrell, Fintan Burke (0-1 free) | Kenny Park, Athenry; Attendance: 200; Referee: Alan Kelly |

St. Thomas':
| 1 | Gerald Kelly |
| 2 | Cian Mahoney |
| 3 | Fintan Burke |
| 7 | Sean Skehill |
| 18 | John Headd |
| 6 | Shane Cooney |
| 4 | David Sherry |
| 8 | David Burke |
| 9 | James Regan |
| 12 | Evan Duggan |
| 11 | Conor Cooney (c) |
| 10 | Darragh Burke |
| 15 | Eanna Burke |
| 13 | Oisin Flannery |
| 14 | Bernard Burke |
Substitutes Used:
| 19 | Brendan Farrell for Evan Duggan (51 mins) |
Manager:
Kevin Lally

Turloughmore:
| 1 | Mark Fahy |
| 2 | Mikey Morris |
| 3 | Ronan Burke |
| 17 | Mark Murphy |
| 4 | Daniel Loftus |
| 6 | Jamie Holland |
| 7 | Kevin Hussey |
| 5 | Fergal Moore |
| 8 | Daithi Burke (c) |
| 11 | Conor Walsh |
| 9 | Sean Loftus |
| 19 | Matthew Keating |
| 13 | Barry Callanan |
| 15 | Gary Burke |
| 10 | Sean Linnane |
Substitutes Used:
| 23 | Brion Connolly for Daithi Burke (30 mins) |
| 12 | Barry McDonagh for Matthew Keating (45 mins) |
| 8 | Daithi Burke for Barry Callanan (58 mins) |
| 14 | Ronan Badger for Gary Burke (58 mins) |
Joint Managers:
Joe Hession, Francis Forde
