= 2019 Galway Senior Hurling Championship =

Annual hurling competition season

Tournament details
- County: Galway
- Year: 2019

Winners
- Champions: St. Thomas'
- Manager: Kevin Lally
- Captain: Conor Cooney

Promotion/Relegation
- Promoted team(s): Kinvara
- Relegated team(s): Abbeyknockmoy

The 2019 Galway Senior Hurling Championship was the 122nd staging of the Galway Senior Hurling Championship since its establishment in 1887.

St. Thomas' were the reigning champions and went on to retain the title. Oranmore-Maree participated in the senior championship having been promoted from the intermediate competition in 2018.

== Competition format ==
Twenty four reams compete in the initial group stages of the championship – the top ranked twelve teams compete in the Senior A Group and the second ranked twelve teams compete in the Senior B Group. Eight teams from the Senior A Group and four teams from the Senior B Group progress to the knockout stage. The competition format is explained further in each of the championship rounds in the sections below.

== Group stage ==
=== Senior A ===
Senior A consists of 12 teams divided into two groups of 6. The top two teams from each group automatically qualify for the quarter-finals. The third and fourth teams from each group play in the preliminary quarter finals. The bottom two teams from each group play-off with the losing team relegated to playing in the following year's Senior B Section.

==== Senior A - Group 1 ====
Pos	Team	Pld	W	D	L	SF	SA	Diff	Pts
1	Turloughmore	5	4	1	0	8-81	5-58	30	9
2	St. Thomas'	5	3	1	1	9-79	2-64	36	7
3	Liam Mellows	5	3	0	2	6-75	5-67	11	6
4	Tommy Larkin's	5	2	0	3	10-70	6-80	2	4
5	Castlegar	5	2	0	3	3-83	6-78	-4	4
6	Portumna	5	0	0	5	3-71	15-110	-75	0

6 April 2019; 15:00; Round 1	Turloughmore	4-18 - 1-12	Portumna	Kenny Park, Athenry
6 April 2019; 15:00; Round 1	Richard Doyle (2-1), Conor Walsh (0-6, 5 frees), Sean Linnane (1-2), Ronan Badger (1-2), Sean Loftus (0-2), Fergal Moore (0-2), Jamie Holland (0-1), Kevin Hussey (0-1), Daniel Loftus (0-1)		Ronan O'Meara (1-6, 5 frees), Andy Smith (0-3, 2 frees), Kevin Hayes (0-2), Neil Connelly (0-1)	Kenny Park, Athenry

6 April 2019; 16:45; Round 1	Tommy Larkin's	2-15 - 0-16	Castlegar	Duggan Park, Ballinasloe; Referee: John McDonagh
6 April 2019; 16:45; Round 1	Jason Flynn (0-9, 8 frees), Eoghan Nevin (2-0), Ronan Murphy (0-3), Kevin McHugo (0-2), David Hickey (0-1)		Thomas Kimball (0-7, 6 frees), Enda Concannon (0-2), Oisin Connolly (0-2), Jack Coyne (0-2), Donal McGreal (0-1), Micheal Fahy (0-1), Sean Neary (0-1)	Duggan Park, Ballinasloe; Referee: John McDonagh

7 April 2019; 14:30; Round 1	Liam Mellows	1-17 - 0-14	St. Thomas'	Kenny Park, Athenry; Referee: Alan Kelly
7 April 2019; 14:30; Round 1	Tadhg Haran (0-9, 6 frees), Adrian Morrissey (0-3, 2 frees), Jack Hastings (1-0), Conor Kavanagh (0-1), David Collins (0-1), Jack Forde (0-1), Enda Fallon (0-1), Kevin Lee (0-1)		Darragh Burke (0-11, 10 frees), Conor Cooney (0-2), David Burke (0-1 free)	Kenny Park, Athenry; Referee: Alan Kelly

20 April 2019; 18:15; Round 2	Turloughmore	1-20 - 2-11	Liam Mellows	Pearse Stadium; Referee: John Keane
20 April 2019; 18:15; Round 2	Richard Doyle (1-2), Conor Walsh (0-4, 3 frees), Jamie Holland (0-3, 2 frees), Barry McDonagh (0-3), Sean Linnane (0-3), Sean Loftus (0-2), Daithí Burke (0-2), Ronan Badger (0-1)		Tadhg Haran (1-7, 1-4 frees), David Collins (1-0), Jacl Forde (0-1), Adrian Morrissey (0-1), Ronan Elwood (0-1), Conor Kavanagh (0-1)	Pearse Stadium; Referee: John Keane

21 April 2019; 13:30; Round 2	St. Thomas'	2-15 - 1-8	Tommy Larkin's	Gort; Referee: Liam Gordon
21 April 2019; 13:30; Round 2	Darragh Burke (0-8 frees), Colin Fallon (1-0), Brendan Farrell (1-0), Oisin Flannery (0-2), Shane Cooney (0-1), David Burke (0-1), Bernard Burke (0-1), Conor Cooney (0-1), Damien McGlynn (0-1)		Jason Flynn (0-5 frees), Eamon Hayes (1-0), Colm Flynn (0-1), David Hickey (0-1), Conor Gardiner (0-1)	Gort; Referee: Liam Gordon

20 April 2019; 16:30; Round 2	Castlegar	2-25 - 1-16	Portumna	Kenny Park, Athenry; Referee: Shane Hynes
20 April 2019; 16:30; Round 2	Oisin Connolly (0-13, 10 frees), Enda Concannon (1-2), Sean Neary (0-3), Micheal Fahy (1-0), Thomas Mannion (0-2), Dean Higgins (0-2), Donal Barry (0-1), Kevin Keane (0-1), Tomas Kimball (0-1)		Ronan O'Meara (1-10, 1-8 frees), Andy Smith (0-4, 3 frees), Oisin O'Sullivan (0-1), Donal Donoghue (0-1)	Kenny Park, Athenry; Referee: Shane Hynes

17 August 2019; 13:00; Round 3	St. Thomas'	1-16 - 0-12	Castlegar	Pearse Stadium; Referee: Shane Hynes
17 August 2019; 13:00; Round 3	Darragh Burke (0-7, 6 frees, 1 sideline), Conor Cooney (1-2), Brendan Farrell (0-2), Evan Duggan (0-1), David Sherry (0-1), James Regan (0-1), Eanna Burke (0-1), Damien McGlynn (0-1)		Oisin Connolly (0-10, 6 frees), Ger Farragher (0-1 free), Dean Higgins (0-1)	Pearse Stadium; Referee: Shane Hynes

17 August 2019; 13:00; Round 3	Liam Mellows	1-16 - 0-10	Portumna	Loughrea; Referee: John McDonagh
17 August 2019; 13:00; Round 3	Tadhg Haran (0-9, 6 frees), David Collins (1-0), Sean Morrissey (0-1), Jack Hastings (0-1), Conor Elwood (0-1), Ronan Elwood (0-1), Adrian Morrissey (0-1), Conor Kavanagh (0-1), Jack Forde (0-1)		Ronan O'Meara (0-4, 1 free), Joe Canning (0-2, 1 free, 1 sideline), Gareth Heagney (0-1), Andy Smith (0-1), Damien Hayes (0-1), Neil Connneely (0-1)	Loughrea; Referee: John McDonagh

17 August 2019; 14:45; Round 3	Turloughmore	2-17 - 2-14	Tommy Larkins	Duggan Park, Ballinasloe; Referee: Michael Haverty
17 August 2019; 14:45; Round 3	Conor Walsh (0-6 frees), Sean Linnane (1-1), Jamie Holland (0-4 frees), Ronan Badger (1-0 pen), Gary Burke (0-2), Barry McDonagh (0-2), Daniel Loftus (0-1), Richard Doyle (0-1)		Jason Flynn (1-8, 8 frees), Ronan Murphy (1-2), Kevin Hooban (0-1), Conor Gardiner (0-1), Kevin McHugo (0-1), Brian McCormack (0-1)	Duggan Park, Ballinasloe; Referee: Michael Haverty

30 August 2019; 18:45; Round 4	Turloughmore	1-18 - 0-15	Castlegar	Kenny Park, Athenry; Referee: Liam Gordon
30 August 2019; 18:45; Round 4	Conor Walsh (0-6, 5 frees), Sean Loftus (0-4), Ronan Badger (1-0), Jamie Holland (0-2 frees), Gary Burke (0-2), Daithí Burke (0-1), Richard Doyle (0-1), Sean Linnane (0-1), Damien Holland (0-1)		Oisin Connolly (0-10, 9 frees), Ger Farragher (0-1), Dean Higgins (0-1), Enda Concannon (0-1), Sean Neary (0-1), Sean Connolly (0-1)	Kenny Park, Athenry; Referee: Liam Gordon

31 August 2019; 16:30; Round 4	St. Thomas'	6-26 - 0-19	Portumna	Kenny Park, Athenry; Referee: Paul Fahy
31 August 2019; 16:30; Round 4	Darragh Burke (1-5, 4 frees), Conor Cooney (1-5, 2 frees), Brendan Farrell (2-1), Eanna Burke (1-2), Oisin Flannery (1-2), David Burke (0-4), James Regan (0-3), Bernard Burke (0-2), Shane Cooney (0-1), Cathal Burke (0-1)		Ronan O'Meara (0-11), Joe Canning (0-7, 5 frees), Neil Conneely (0-1)	Kenny Park, Athenry; Referee: Paul Fahy

1 September 2019; 18:30; Round 4	Liam Mellows	1-18 - 3-8	Tommy Larkin's	Kenny Park, Athenry; Referee: John McDonagh
1 September 2019; 18:30; Round 4	Tadhg Haran (1-8, 6 frees), Conor Kavanagh (0-2), David Collins (0-2), Jack Hastings (0-2), Mark Hughes (0-1), Conor Elwood (0-1), Ronan Elwood (0-1), Adrian Morrissey (0-1)		Conor Gardiner (1-2), Colm Flynn (1-1), Jason Flynn (0-4, 3 frees), Darren Duggan (1-0), David Hickey (0-1)	Kenny Park, Athenry; Referee: John McDonagh

15 September 2019; 17:30; Round 5	Turloughmore	0-08 - 0-08	St Thomas'	Kenny Park, Athenry; Referee: John McDonagh
15 September 2019; 17:30; Round 5	Darragh Burke (0-5, 4 frees), Eanna Burke (0-2), Oisin Flannery (0-1)		Conor Walsh (0-4, 2 frees), Sean Linnane (0-2), Daniel Loftus (0-1), Sean Loftus (0-1)	Kenny Park, Athenry; Referee: John McDonagh

15 September 2019; 17:30; Round 5	Castlegar	1-15 - 1-13	Liam Mellows	Pearse Stadium; Referee: John Keane
15 September 2019; 17:30; Round 5	Oisin Connolly (0-5 frees), Ger Farragher (0-4, 2 frees), Enda Concannon (0-3), Kevin Keane (1-0), Sean Neary (0-2), Mark Gill (0-1)		Tadhg Haran (0-9, 6 frees), Aonghus Callanan (1-0), Jack Hastings (0-2), Ronan Elwood (0-1), Adrian Morrissey (0-1)	Pearse Stadium; Referee: John Keane

15 September 2019; 17:30; Round 5	Tommy Larkin's	2-25 - 1-14	Portumna	Duggan Park, Ballinasloe; Referee: Ger O'Connor
15 September 2019; 17:30; Round 5	Jason Flynn (0-10, 8 frees), Ronan Murphy (2-4), Conor Gardiner (0-4), Colm Flynn (0-3), Darren Duggan (0-2), Conor Nevin (0-1)		Ronan O'Meara (0-7, 5 frees), Sean Tuohy (1-0), Joe Canning (0-3 frees), Sean O'Brien (0-3), Donal Donoghue (0-1)	Duggan Park, Ballinasloe; Referee: Ger O'Connor

==== Senior A - Group 2 ====
Pos	Team	Pld	W	D	L	SF	SA	Diff	Pts
1	Loughrea	5	4	1	0	7-92	5-66	32	9
2	Sarsfields	5	3	1	1	4-82	4-83	-1	7
3	Cappataggle	5	3	0	2	11-69	6-75	9	6
4	Tynagh/Abbey-Duniry	5	1	1	3	2-85	6-92	-19	4
5	Gort	5	1	1	3	6-78	6-76	6	3
6	Kilnadeema-Leitrim	5	0	1	4	6-75	9-89	-23	1

6 April 2019; 16:45; Round 1	Gort	3-12 - 0-15	Kilnadeema-Leitrim	Loughrea; Referee: Seamus Moran
6 April 2019; 16:45; Round 1	Aiden Helebert (0-9, 8 frees), Gerard O'Donoghue (2-1), Sylvie Óg Linnane (1-0), Greg Lally (0-1), Aidan Harte (0-1)		Conor Molloy (0-6 frees), Brian Molloy (0-5, 4 frees), Mikey Lynch (0-2), Mark Lawless (0-1)	Loughrea; Referee: Seamus Moran

7 April 2019; 16:00; Round 1	Loughrea	3-17 - 0-16	Tynagh/Abbey-Duniry	Duggan Park, Ballinasloe; Referee: Brian Keon
7 April 2019; 16:00; Round 1	Jamie Ryan (2-12, 1-0 sideline, 6 frees), Joe Mooney (1-1), Martin McManus (0-2), Shane O'Brien (0-2)		Shane Maloney (0-8 frees), Johnny Conroy (0-3), Micheal Dervan (0-2), Gary McHugo (0-1), Padraig Brehony (0-1), Thomas Gordon (0-1)	Duggan Park, Ballinasloe; Referee: Brian Keon

7 April 2019; 17:45; Round 1	Sarsfields	1-17 - 1-14	Cappataggle	Duggan Park, Ballinasloe; Referee: Shane Hynes
7 April 2019; 17:45; Round 1	Niall Morrissey (0-9, 8 frees), Brian MacLochlainn (0-4), Mark O'Regan (1-0), Ian Fox (0-2), Kevin Cooney (0-1), Eric Kenny (0-1)		Alan Dolan (0-7, 5 frees), Eanna Garvey (1-0), Ja Mannion (0-2), Michael Garvey (0-2), Donal Mannion (0-1), Darragh Dolan (0-1), James Egan (0-1)	Duggan Park, Ballinasloe; Referee: Shane Hynes

20 April 2019; 18:15; Round 2	Gort	2-14 - 2-14	Loughrea	Kenny Park, Athenry; Referee: John McDonagh
20 April 2019; 18:15; Round 2	Aiden Helebert (0-9, 7 frees), Gerard O'Donoghue (2-0), Keith Killilea (0-2), Aidan Harte (0-1), Jason O'Donoghue (0-1), Sylvie Óg Linnane (0-1)		Jamie Ryan (1-3, 2 frees), Joe Mooney (0-4), Ian Hanrahan (1-1), Dylan Shaughnessy (0-2), Paul Hoban (0-1), Neil Keary (0-1), Shane O'Brien (0-1), Gearoid Loughnane (0-1)	Kenny Park, Athenry; Referee: John McDonagh

20 April 2019; 18:15; Round 2	Sarsfields	1-19 - 3-13	Kilnadeema-Leitrim	Duggan Park, Ballinasloe; Referee: Derek Kelly
20 April 2019; 18:15; Round 2	Niall Morrissey (0-11, 10 frees), Joseph Cooney (1-2), Alan Ward (0-2), Kevin Cooney (0-2, 1 sideline), Darren Morrissey (0-1), Ian Fox (0-1)		Brian Molloy (1-5, 1-0 pen, 5 frees), Jack Kenny (1-2), Vinnie Kenny (1-0), Liam Kelly (0-2, 1 free), Dylan Towolwai (0-2), Mark Lawless (0-2)	Duggan Park, Ballinasloe; Referee: Derek Kelly

21 April 2019; 16:30; Round 2	Cappataggle	3-17 - 2-13	Tynagh/Abbey-Duniry	Duggan Park, Ballinasloe; Referee: Gerry Donoghue
21 April 2019; 16:30; Round 2	Michael Garvey (2-3), Alan Dolan (0-4, 3 frees), Oran Finn (1-1), Darragh Dolan (0-3), Ja Mannion (0-2), Kevin Kelly (0-1), Stephen Creaven (0-1), Ronan Garvey (0-1), David Malone (0-1)		Shane Moloney (0-6, 5 frees), Johnny Conroy (1-1), Padraig Robinson (1-1), Padraig Brehony (0-2), Paul Killeen (0-1), Colm Larkin (0-1), Micheal Dervan (0-1)	Duggan Park, Ballinasloe; Referee: Gerry Donoghue

17 August 2019; 13:45; Round 3	Sarsfields	0-17 - 0-13	Tynagh-Abbey/Duniry	Gort; Referee: Shane Curley
17 August 2019; 13:45; Round 3	Niall Morrissey (0-6, 4 frees), Kevin Cooney (0-3), Ian Skehill (0-2), Ian Fox (0-2), Darren Morrissey (0-1), Ivan Kenny (0-1), Alan Ward (0-1), Eric Kenny (0-1)		Shane Moloney (0-8, 6 frees), David Jordan (0-1), Ben Moran (0-1), Padraig Breheny (0-1), John Conroy (0-1), Padraig Robinson (0-1)	Gort; Referee: Shane Curley

17 August 2019; 14:45; Round 3	Cappataggle	2-10 - 1-12	Gort	Loughrea; Referee: Derek Kelly
17 August 2019; 14:45; Round 3	Niall Collins (0-7, 5 frees), Ja Mannion (1-0), Michael Garvey (1-0), Darragh Dolan (0-1), Damien Joyce (0-1), Alan Dolan (0-1)		Greg Lally (4 frees), Aiden Helebert (0-3), Albert Mullins (1-0), Kaelan Higgins (0-2), Michael Mullins (0-1)	Loughrea; Referee: Derek Kelly

17 August 2019; 15:30; Round 3	Loughrea	1-22 - 2-10	Kilnadeema-Leitrim	Gort; Referee: Ger O'Connor
17 August 2019; 15:30; Round 3	Jamie Ryan (0-7, 4 frees), Neil Keary (1-4), Martin McManus (0-3), Dylan Shaughnessey (0-2), Brian Keary (0-2), Shane Sweeney (0-1), Paul Hoban (0-1), Johnny Coen (0-1), Tom Hoban (0-1)		Mikey Lynch (1-2), Mark Lawless (1-1), Brian Molloy (0-3, 2 frees), Jack Kenny (0-2), Darragh O'Donoghue (0-1), Liam Kelly (0-1)	Gort; Referee: Ger O'Connor

31 August 2019; 18:00; Round 4	Sarsfields	2-18 - 0-22	Gort	Kenny Park, Athenry; Referee: John Keane
31 August 2019; 18:00; Round 4	Niall Morrissey (1-10, 10 frees), Kieran Kelly (1-1), Kevin Cooney (0-2), Kenneth Cooney (0-1), Eric Kenny (0-1), Ivan Kenny (0-1), Alan Ward (0-1), Mark O'Regan (0-1)		Greg Lally (0-8, 7 frees), Jason O'Donoghue (0-3), Kaelan Higgins (0-2), Aidan Harte (0-2), Gerard O'Donoghue (0-2), Wayne Walsh (0-2), Jack Grealish (0-1), Jason Grealish (0-1), Aiden Helebert (0-1)	Kenny Park, Athenry; Referee: John Keane

31 August 2019; 18:30; Round 4	Tynagh-Abbey/Duniry	0-24 - 0-22	Kilnadeema-Leitrim	Duggan Park, Ballinasloe; Referee: Brian Keon
31 August 2019; 18:30; Round 4	Shane Moloney (0-11, 6 frees), John Conroy (0-3), Paul Killeen (0-3), Padraig Robinson (0-2), Niall Moloney (0-2), David Jordan (0-1), Kevin Moloney (0-1), Padraig Brehony (0-1), Ben Moran (0-1),		Brian Molloy (0-13, 10 frees), Mikey Lynch (0-3), Liam Kelly (0-2), Dylan Towolowi (0-2), Vinny Kenny (0-1), Luke Devine (0-1)	Duggan Park, Ballinasloe; Referee: Brian Keon

1 September 2019; 18:30; Round 4	Loughrea	1-18 - 1-15	Cappataggle	Duggan Park, Ballinasloe; Referee: Shane Hynes
1 September 2019; 18:30; Round 4	Jamie Ryan (0-10, 4 frees 1 sideline), Johnny Coen (1-1), Martin McManus (0-4), Tom Hoban (0-1), Brian Keary (0-1), Neil Keary (0-1)		Donal Mannion (1-3), Alan Dolan (0-6 frees), Niall Collins (0-3 frees), Dan Nevin (0-2), Darragh Dolan (0-1), James Egan (0-1)	Duggan Park, Ballinasloe; Referee: Shane Hynes

14 September 2019; 16:00; Round 5	Tynagh-Abbey/Duniry	1-19 - 0-19	Gort	Kenny Park, Athenry; Referee: Michael Conway
14 September 2019; 16:00; Round 5	Shane Maloney (0-14, 10 frees), Padraig Breheny (1-0), Paul Killeen (0-1), Colm Larkin (0-1), Kevin Maloney (0-1), Padraig Robinson (0-1), John Conroy (0-1)		Aiden Helebert (0-7, 4 frees), Keith Killilea (0-3), Greg Lally (0-2 frees), Aidan Harte (0-2), Gerard O'Donoghue (0-2), Sylvie Óg Linnane (0-1), Kaelan Higgins (0-1), Albert Mullins (0-1)	Kenny Park, Athenry; Referee: Michael Conway

14 September 2019; 16:00; Round 5	Loughrea	0-21 - 0-11	Sarsfields	Duggan Park, Ballinasloe; Referee: Shane Hynes
14 September 2019; 16:00; Round 5	Jamie Ryan (0-10, 6 frees), Joe Mooney (0-3), Brian Keary (0-2), Neil Keary (0-2), Alan Cormican (0-1), Dylan Shaughnessey (0-1), Johnny Coen (0-1), Martin McManus (0-1)		Eric Kenny (0-8, frees), Ian Fox (0-1), Kieran Kelly (0-1), Alan Ward (0-1)	Duggan Park, Ballinasloe; Referee: Shane Hynes

14 September 2019; 16:00; Round 5	Cappataggle	4-13 - 1-15	Kilnadeema-Leitrim	Loughrea; Referee: Peter Murphy
14 September 2019; 16:00; Round 5	Donal Mannion (2-1), Michael Garvey (1-3, 1 free), Alan Dolan (0-3, 2 frees), Eanna Garvey (1-0), Ja Mannion (0-3), Daniel Reddan (0-1), Oran Finn (0-1), Kevin Kelly (0-1)		Brian Molloy (0-8, 6 frees), Mikey Lynch (0-4), Liam Kelly (1-1), Jack Kenny (0-1), Dylan Towolawi (0-1)	Loughrea; Referee: Peter Murphy

==== Senior A - Relegation ====
28 September 2019; 14:00; Senior A - Relegation	Castlegar	3-13 - 2-13	Kilnadeema-Leitrim	Loughrea; Referee: James Lundon

28 September 2019; 15:30; Senior A - Relegation	Portumna	0-21 - 2-14	Gort	Loughrea; Referee: Michael Haverty

=== Senior B ===
Senior B consists of 12 teams divided into two groups of 6. The winners of each group qualify for the 2019 preliminary quarter finals and compete in the following year's Senior A competition. The four second and third placed teams play-off with the two winners also qualifying for the 2019 preliminary quarter finals.

==== Senior B - Group 1 ====
Pos	Team	Pld	W	D	L	SF	SA	Diff	Pts
1	Oranmore-Maree	5	3	2	0	7-76	3-76	12	8
2	Craughwell	5	4	0	1	6-100	2-66	46	8
3	Athenry	5	3	0	2	9-72	8-83	-8	6
4	Padraig Pearses	5	2	1	2	2-70	5-66	-5	5
5	Beagh	5	1	0	4	3-72	6-81	-18	2
6	Ahascragh-Fohenagh	5	0	1	4	3-62	6-78	-27	1

6 April 2019; 15:00; Round 1	Athenry	1-19 - 0-18	Beagh	Loughrea; Referee: Derek Kelly
6 April 2019; 15:00; Round 1	Cian Burke (0-5, 3 frees), Ronan Hardiman (0-5), Noel Keogh (1-1), Martin Cullen (0-2), Patrick Hannon (0-2), Cillian Lawless (0-1) Conor Burke (0-1), Jack MacCullagh (0-1), James Divilly (0-1),		Kevin Keehan (0-9, 6 frees), Rory Gantley (0-2 frees), Joe Gantley (0-3), Evan Hunt (0-2), John Moylan (0-1), Patrick Earley (0-1)	Loughrea; Referee: Derek Kelly

6 April 2019; 16:45; Round 1	Oranmore-Maree	1-19 - 1-17	Craughwell	Pearse Stadium; Referee: Liam Gordon
6 April 2019; 16:45; Round 1	Niall Burke (0-14, 9 frees), Sean McInerney (1-1), Conor Hanniffy (0-2), Padraic Keane (0-1), Rian Maher (0-1)		Niall Healy (0-6, 4 frees), Jamie Ryan (1-2), Patrick Monaghan (0-2), Shane Dolan (0-2), Fergal Healy (0-2), John Greaney (0-1), Matthew Freaney (0-1), Dean Callanan (0-1)	Pearse Stadium; Referee: Liam Gordon

7 April 2019; 12:45; Round 1	Padraig Pearses	0-18 - 0-11	Ahascragh-Fohenagh	Kenny Park, Athenry; Referee: Gerry Donoghue
7 April 2019; 12:45; Round 1	Emmet Ward (0-9, 8 frees), James Gelston (0-3), Ronan Bellew (0-2), Damien Wynne (0-1), Cyril Donnellan (0-1), Conor Fahey (0-1), Ronan O'Neill (0-1)		Cathal Mannion (0-9, 6 frees), Padraig Mannion (0-1), Mark Kelly (0-1)	Kenny Park, Athenry; Referee: Gerry Donoghue

20 April 2019; 16:30; Round 2	Oranmore-Maree	1-11 - 0-14	Ahascragh-Fohenagh	Kenny Park, Athenry; Referee: Michael Haverty
20 April 2019; 16:30; Round 2	Niall Burke (0-7, 6 frees), Sean McInerney (1-1), Gearoid McInerney (0-1), Conor Hanniffy (0-1), Paraic Keane (0-1)		Cathal Mannion (0-9, 6 frees); Noel Ward (0-3), Padraig Mannion (0-1), Sean Bleahene (0-1)	Kenny Park, Athenry; Referee: Michael Haverty

21 April 2019; 14:45; Round 2	Athenry	2-14 - 1-13	Padraig Pearse's	Duggan Park, Ballinasloe; Referee: Christy Browne
21 April 2019; 14:45; Round 2	Cian Burke (0-9, 7 frees), Noel Keogh (1-0), Eoin Caulfield (1-0), Conor Burke (0-1), James Divilly (0-1), Cillian Lawless (0-1), Patrick Hannon (0-1), Ciaran O'Dwyer (0-1)		Emmet Ward (1-9, 1-0 pen, 9 frees), Enda Cunniffe (0-1), Dean Reilly (0-1), James Gelston (0-1), Cyril Donnelan (0-1 free)	Duggan Park, Ballinasloe; Referee: Christy Browne

21 April 2019; 14:45; Round 2	Craughwell	1-19 - 0-14	Beagh	Kenny Park, Athenry; Referee: Paul Fahy
21 April 2019; 14:45; Round 2	Niall Healy (0-9, 8 frees), Thomas Monaghan (1-3), Patrick Monaghan (0-3), Jamie Ryan (0-1), Shane Dolan (0-1), Fergal Healy (0-1), Adrian Prendergast (0-1)		Kevin Keehan (0-5, 5 frees), Joe Gantley (0-3), Adrian Tuohey (0-2), John Moylan (0-2), Padraic Landers (0-2)	Kenny Park, Athenry; Referee: Paul Fahy

17 August 2019; 13:00; Round 3	Craughwell	0-23 - 0-9	Ahascragh-Fohenagh	Duggan Park, Ballinasloe; Referee: Christy Brown
17 August 2019; 13:00; Round 3	Niall Healy (0-11, 10 frees), Thomas Monaghan (0-3), Patrick Monaghan (0-2), James Greaney (0-2), Stephen Hynes (0-2), Adrian Cullinane (0-1), Adrian Prendergast (0-1), Dean Callanan (0-1), Fergal Healy (0-1)		Stephen Smyth (0-5 frees), Cathal Mannion (0-3, 1 free), Sean Bleahane (0-1)	Duggan Park, Ballinasloe; Referee: Christy Brown

17 August 2019; 14:45; Round 3	Padraig Pearses	0-14 - 2-5	Beagh	Kenny Park, Athenry; Referee: Seamus Moran
17 August 2019; 14:45; Round 3	Emmet Ward (0-5, 3 frees), Ronan Bellew (0-4), Cyril Donnellan (0-2), Sean Hardiman (0-1), James Gelston (0-1), Dean Reilly (0-1)		Joe Gantley (1-0), Adrian Tuohey (1-0), Kevin Keehan (3 frees), Adrian Diviney (0-1 free), Padraic Landers (0-1)	Kenny Park, Athenry; Referee: Seamus Moran

17 August 2019; 14:45; Round 3	Oranmore-Maree	2-18 - 2-13	Athenry	Pearse Stadium; Referee: Michael Conway
17 August 2019; 14:45; Round 3	Niall Burke (0-9, 3 frees), Sean McInerney (1-1), Eanna Burke (0-3), Marcus Quinn (1-0), Ross Malone (0-2, 1 free), Padraic Keane (0-2), Conor Hanniffy (0-1)		Cian Burke (1-6, 4 frees), Donal Parr (1-0), Ronan Hardiman (0-2), Cillian Lawless (0-2), Mark Hannon (0-1), Patrick Hannon (0-1), Martin Cullen (0-1)	Pearse Stadium; Referee: Michael Conway

30 August 2019; 19:15; Round 4	Craughwell	1-23 - 1-12	Pádraig Pearse's	Duggan Park, Ballinasloe; Referee: Derek Kelly
30 August 2019; 19:15; Round 4	Niall Healy (1-6, 3 frees), Stephen Hynes (0-5), Thomas Monaghan (0-3), Adrain Prendergast (0-2), Dean Callanan (0-2), Fergal Healy (0-2), Jamie Ryan (0-2), Brian Dolan (0-1)		Oisin Flannery (1-3, 2 frees), Thomas Flannery (0-5 frees), Ronan Bellew (0-2), Fergal Flannery (0-1 free), Enda Cunniffe (0-1)	Duggan Park, Ballinasloe; Referee: Derek Kelly

31 August 2019; 16:30; Round 4	Athenry	4-13 - 2-15	Ahascragh-Fohenagh	Loughrea; Referee: Peter Murphy
31 August 2019; 16:30; Round 4	Cian Burke (1-7, 4 frees), Paddy Rabbitte (1-2), Cillian Lawless (1-1), Patrick Hannon (1-0), Ronan Hardiman (0-2), Martin Cullen (0-1)		Cathal Mannion (1-6, 4 frees), Sean Bleahene (1-2), Padraig Mannion (0-3), Ronan Kelly (0-2), Mark Kelly (0-1), Darragh Glynn (0-1)	Loughrea; Referee: Peter Murphy

31 August 2019; 18:00; Round 4	Oranmore-Maree	3-16 - 0-20	Beagh	Loughrea; Referee: Seamus Moran
31 August 2019; 18:00; Round 4	Niall Burke (0-11, 6 frees), Sean McInerney (2-2), Conor Hanniffy (1-0), Ross Malone (0-1), Eanna Burke (0-1), Padraic Keane (0-1)		Kevin Keehan (0-11 frees), Evan Hunt (0-5, 1 sideline), John Moylan (0-2), Brian McGuane (0-1), Padraic Landers (0-1)	Loughrea; Referee: Seamus Moran

14 September 2019; 14:30; Round 5	Oranmore-Maree	0-13 - 0-13	Pádraig Pearse's	Pearse Stadium; Referee: Derek Kelly
14 September 2019; 14:30; Round 5	Niall Burke (0-10, 8 frees), Gearoid McInerney (0-1), Ross Malone (0-1), Sean McInerney (0-1)		Oisin Flannery (0-5, frees), Fergal Flannery (0-2 frees), Thomas Flannery (0-2), Enda Cunniffe (0-1), Kerril Hardiman (0-1), Conor Fahey (0-1), Ronan Bellew (0-1)	Pearse Stadium; Referee: Derek Kelly

14 September 2019; 14:30; Round 5	Beagh	1-15 - 1-13	Ahascragh-Fohenagh	Loughrea; Referee: Gerry Donoghue
14 September 2019; 14:30; Round 5	Kevin Keehan (1-7, 1-6 frees), Tommy McKeown (0-4), Evan Hunt (0-2), Joe Gantley (0-2)		Cathal Mannion (1-8, 1-0 penalty, 6 frees), Stephen Kelly (0-2), Darragh Glynn (0-1), Sean Bleahene (0-1), Mark Kelly (0-1)	Loughrea; Referee: Gerry Donoghue

14 September 2019; 14:30; Round 5	Craughwell	3-19 - 0-13	Athenry	Kenny Park, Athenry; Referee: Brian Keon
14 September 2019; 14:30; Round 5	Jamie Ryan (3-3), Niall Healy (0-6, 3 frees), Adrian Prendergast (0-3), Shane Dolan (0-2), John Greaney (0-1), Patrick Monaghan (0-1), Thomas Monaghan (0-1), Dean Callanan (0-1), James Greaney (0-1)		Cian Burke (0-7, 5 frees), Ronan Hardiman (0-2), Paddy Hannon (0-1), Patrick Rabbitte (0-1), Cillian Lawless (0-1), Ciaran O'Dwyer (0-1)	Kenny Park, Athenry; Referee: Brian Keon

==== Senior B - Group 2 ====
Pos	Team	Pld	W	D	L	SF	SA	Diff	Pts
1	Clarinbridge	5	5	0	0	8-80	1-76	25	10
2	Killimordaly	5	4	0	1	7-86	7-68	18	8
3	Mullagh	5	2	1	2	5-82	4-77	8	5
4	Ardrahan	5	1	1	3	4-72	6-78	-12	3
5	Ballindereen	5	1	1	3	5-65	8-69	-13	3
6	Abbeyknockmoy	5	0	1	4	2-65	7-82	-26	1

6 April 2019; 15:00; Round 1	Ardrahan	2-16 - 1-9	Abbeyknockmoy	Duggan Park, Ballinasloe; Referee: Christy Brown
6 April 2019; 15:00; Round 1	Sean Gardiner (0-6 frees), Maurice Callanan (1-3), Jason Kennedy (1-1, 1-0 pen), Cianan Fahy (0-4, 3 frees), Liam Forde (0-1), Cian Walsh (0-1)		Paul Flaherty (1-5, 1-0 pen, 4 frees), Eoin Loftus (0-2, 1 sideline), Brian O'Donnell (0-1), Danny Mullins (0-1),	Duggan Park, Ballinasloe; Referee: Christy Brown

7 April 2019; 16:00; Round 1	Killimordaly	2-22 - 2-15	Ballindereen	Gort; Referee: Ger O'Connor
7 April 2019; 16:00; Round 1	Brian Burke (0-11, 7 frees), Darren Daly (1-3), Luke Lynskey (1-2), Brian Concannon (0-3), Paul Creaven (0-2), David Earls (0-1)		Roy Lane (1-5, 5 frees), Sean Coen (1-2), Kevin Lane (0-3), Niall Coen (0-2), David O'Connor (0-1), Kieran Ryan (0-1), Shane Larkin (0-1)	Gort; Referee: Ger O'Connor

7 April 2019; 17:45; Round 1	Clarinbridge	0-20 - 1-12	Mullagh	Gort; Referee: Paul Fahy
7 April 2019; 17:45; Round 1	Evan Niland (0-13, 8 frees), Shane Ryan (0-2), Michael Daly (0-2), Cian Salmon (0-1), Mark Kennedy (0-1), Patrick Foley (0-1)		Cathal Dervan (1-8, 1-0 pen, 8 frees), Davy Glennon (0-2), Sean Hardiman (0-1), Jack Finnerty (0-1)	Gort; Referee: Paul Fahy

20 April 2019; 16:30; Round 2	Killimordaly	2-21 - 1-18	Abbeyknockmoy	Duggan Park, Ballinasloe; Referee: Seamus Moran
20 April 2019; 16:30; Round 2	B Burke (0-11, 7 frees), Brian Concannon (0-6), Luke Lynskey (1-0), Paul Creaven (1-0), Paul Concannon (0-1), David Concannon (0-1), Darren Daly (0-1), Keith Coen (0-1)		Paul Flaherty (1-11, 1-0 pen, 9 frees), Caelum Mulry (0-2), Craig Kennedy (0-2), Fionnan Garvey (0-2), Eoin Loftus (0-1)	Duggan Park, Ballinasloe; Referee: Seamus Moran

20 April 2019; 16:30; Round 2	Clarinbridge	3-15 - 0-17	Ballindereen	Pearse Stadium; Referee: Alan Kelly
20 April 2019; 16:30; Round 2	Evan Niland (1-9, 7 frees), Mark Kennedy (1-1), Cian Salmon (1-1), Sean Kilduff (0-2), Michael Daly (0-2)		Roy Lane (0-11 frees), Kevin Lane (0-2), Kieran Ryan (0-2), Kieran Gill (0-1), Sean Coen (0-1)	Pearse Stadium; Referee: Alan Kelly

21 April 2019; 13:45; Round 2	Mullagh	1-28 - 1-15	Ardrahan	Loughrea; Referee: Shane Curley
21 April 2019; 13:45; Round 2	Cathal Dervan (0-9, 5 frees), Davy Glennon (1-3), Sean Hardiman (0-4), Justin Gaynor (0-4), Conor Hardiman (0-3), Ronan Glennon (0-3, 1 free), Cathal Kennedy (0-1), Paddy Hardiman (0-1)		Cianan Fahey (0-5, 3 frees), Jason Kennedy (1-2), Sean Gardiner (0-3 frees), Maurice Callanan (0-2), Iarla Tannian (0-2), Liam Forde (0-1)	Loughrea; Referee: Shane Curley

17 August 2019; 13:00; Round 3	Ballinderreen	0-13 - 0-8	Abbeyknockmoy	Kenny Park, Athenry; Referee: John Keane
17 August 2019; 13:00; Round 3	Niall Coen (0-4), Roy Lane (0-4, 2 frees), Kevin Lane (0-3), David O'Connor (0-1), Shane Larkin (0-1)		Paul Flaherty (0-6, 5 frees), Brian Flaherty (0-2, 1 free)	Kenny Park, Athenry; Referee: John Keane

24 August 2019; 15:00; Round 3	Killimordaly	2-17 - 1-16	Mullagh	Kenny Park, Athenry
24 August 2019; 15:00; Round 3	Paul Creaven (1-9, 7 frees), David Concannon (1-1), Brian Concannon (0-2), Luke Lynskey (0-2), Eanna Ryan (0-1), Tommy Madden (0-1), Darragh Cooney (0-1)		Cathal Dervan (1-10 frees), Davy Glennon (0-2), Finian Coone (0-1), Kevin Briscoe (0-1), Ronan Glennon (0-1), Sean Hardiman (0-1)	Kenny Park, Athenry

24 August 2019; 16:45; Round 3	Clarinbridge	1-18 - 0-19	Ardrahan	Kenny Park, Athenry; Referee: John McDonagh
24 August 2019; 16:45; Round 3	Evan Niland (0-9, 7 frees), Sean Kilduff (1-3), Mark Kennedy (0-3), Ronan Keane (0-1), Niall Armstrong (0-1), Eoin Forde (0-1)		Sean Gardiner (0-9, 8 frees), Ross Albertini (0-4), Iarla Tannian (0-2), Cianan Fahey (0-1), Liam Forde (0-1), Ger Forde (0-1), Maurice Callanan (0-1)	Kenny Park, Athenry; Referee: John McDonagh

31 August 2019; 14:00; Round 4	Mullagh	0-15 0-15	Abbeyknockmoy	Duggan Park, Ballinasloe; Referee: Christopher Browne
31 August 2019; 14:00; Round 4	Cathal Dervan (0-12, 11 frees), Davy Glennon (0-2), Conor Hardiman (0-1)		Cathal Cooley (0-8, 7 frees), Paul Flaherty (0-2), Liam McCarthy (0-1), Eoin Blade (0-1), Paul Cooley (0-1), Danny Mullins (0-1), Craig Kennedy (0-1)	Duggan Park, Ballinasloe; Referee: Christopher Browne

1 September 2019; 17:00; Round 4	Clarinbridge	3-10 - 0-13	Killimordaly	Kenny Park, Athenry; Referee: Gerry Donoghue
1 September 2019; 17:00; Round 4	Evan Niland (0-5, 4 frees), Michael Daly (1-1 frees), Mark Kennedy (1-1), Niall Armstrong (1-1), Andrew Monaghan (0-1), Shane Ryan (0-1)		Paul Creaven (0-10 frees), Tommy Madden (0-2), Brian Concannon (0-1)	Kenny Park, Athenry; Referee: Gerry Donoghue

1 September 2019; 16:30; Round 4	Ballinderreen	2-10 - 1-13	Ardrahan	Gort; Referee: Shane Curley
1 September 2019; 16:30; Round 4	Roy Lane (1-4, 1-3 frees), David O'Connor (1-1), Kevin Lane (0-3, 1 free), Sean Coen (0-1), Niall Coen (0-1)		Sean Gardiner (0-8 frees), Jason Kennedy (1-1), Darach Fahy (0-1 free), Cianan Fahy (0-1), Liam Forde (0-1), Maurice Callanan (0-1)	Gort; Referee: Shane Curley

15 September 2019; 16:00; Round 5	Killimordaly	1-13 - 0-9	Ardrahan	Kenny Park, Athenry; Referee: Derek Kelly
15 September 2019; 16:00; Round 5	Darragh Cooney (1-0), Brian Burke (0-3, 2 frees), Paul Creaven (0-3, 1 free), Luke Lynskey (0-3), David Earls (0-2), Brian Concannon (0-1), Tommy Madden (0-1)		Sean Gardiner (0-3 frees), Darrach Fahey (0-2 frees), Maurice Callanan (0-2), Liam Forde (0-1), Cianan Fahey (0-1)	Kenny Park, Athenry; Referee: Derek Kelly

15 September 2019; 16:00; Round 5	Clarinbridge	1-17 - 0-15	Abbeyknockmoy	Duggan Park, Ballinasloe; Referee: Shane Curley
15 September 2019; 16:00; Round 5	Evan Niland (0-12, 8 frees), Eoin Forde (1-3), Michael Daly (0-1), Stephen Forde (0-1)		Cathal Cooley (0-10, 8 frees), Liam McCarthy (0-2), John Flaherty (0-1), Brian Flaherty (0-1), Caelum Mulry (0-1)	Duggan Park, Ballinasloe; Referee: Shane Curley

15 September 2019; 16:00; Round 5	Mullagh	2-11 - 1-10	Ballinderreen	Loughrea; Referee: Liam Gordon
15 September 2019; 16:00; Round 5	Cathal Dervan (1-5 frees), Davy Glennon (1-4), Justin Gaynor (0-1), Sean Hardiman (0-1)		Roy Lane (0-7, 6 frees), Kevin Lane (1-2), David O'Connor (0-1)	Loughrea; Referee: Liam Gordon

==== Senior B - playoffs ====
The second team in Senior B Group 1 plays the third team in Senior B Group 2 and the third team in Senior B Group 1 plays the second team in Senior B Group 2. The two winning teams qualify for the 2018 senior preliminary quarter finals. The two losing teams are eliminated from this year's senior championship.

21 September 2019; 17:15; Senior B Playoff	Craughwell	0-25 - 0-20	Mullagh	Duggan Park, Ballinasloe; Referee: Paul Fahy
21 September 2019; 17:15; Senior B Playoff	N Healy (0-8, 0-5 frees, 0-1 '65); T Monaghan (0-6); A Prendergast (0-4, 0-3 frees); J Ryan (0-3); M Horan (0-2); F Healy, D Callanan (0-1)		C Dervan (0-9, 0-8 frees, 0-1 '65); D Glennon (0-3); R Glennon, S Hardiman, J Gaynor, S Callanan (0-2)	Duggan Park, Ballinasloe; Referee: Paul Fahy

22 September 2019; 17:30; Senior B Playoff	Athenry	2-20 - 1-13	Killimordaly	Kenny Park, Athenry; Referee: Alan Kelly
22 September 2019; 17:30; Senior B Playoff	Cian Burke (0-10; 0-6 frees; 0-1 '65); R Hardiman (1-3); C Lawless (0-3); N Keogh (1-0); M Hannon, E Caulfield, M Cullen, J Carr (0-1)		B Burke (0-11, 0-8 frees, 0-1 '65); B Concannon (1-0); D Skehill, P Creaven (0-1)	Kenny Park, Athenry; Referee: Alan Kelly

==== Senior B - Relegation ====
The losing team is relegated to the following year's intermediate championship.

28 September 2019; 15:00; Senior B Relegation	Ahascragh-Fohenagh	1-16 - 0-19	Abbeyknockmoy	Duggan Park, Ballinasloe
28 September 2019; 15:00; Senior B Relegation		Report		Duggan Park, Ballinasloe

19 October 2019; 15:45; Senior B Relegation Replay	Ahascragh-Fohenagh	1-17 - 1-12	Abbeyknockmoy	Duggan Park, Ballinasloe; Referee: Conor Quinlan

== Senior Knockout stage ==
=== Senior Preliminary Quarter-finals ===
The four teams who finished third and fourth in the two Senior A Groups play the four Senior B teams who qualified (the two winners of the two Senior B Groups plus the two winners of the Senior B play-offs).

28 September 2019; 16:45; Preliminary Quarter-final	Liam Mellows	1-21 - 1-14	Oranmore-Maree	Pearse Stadium; Referee: Alan Kelly
28 September 2019; 16:45; Preliminary Quarter-final	Tadhg Haran (0-13, 12 frees); Conor Kavanagh (1-2), Mark Hughes (0-2), Jack Forde (0-2), Stephen Barrett (0-1), Aonghus Callanan (0-1)		Niall Burke (1-10, 1-8 frees), Conor Hanniffy (0-2), Niall Geoghegan (0-1), Padraic Keane (0-1)	Pearse Stadium; Referee: Alan Kelly

29 September 2019; 13:30; Preliminary Quarter-final	Tommy Larkin's	1-19 - 0-15	Athenry	Loughrea; Referee: Paul Fahy
29 September 2019; 13:30; Preliminary Quarter-final	Jason Flynn (0-10, 7 frees), Ronan Murphy (1-3), Conor Gardiner (0-3), Colm Flynn (0-2), Darren Duggan (0-1)		Cian Burke (0-7, 6 frees), Cillian Lawless (0-2), Ronan Hardiman (0-2, 1 sideline), Conor Burke (0-1), Ciaran O'Dwyer (0-1), Martin Cullen (0-1), Paddy Rabbitte (0-1)	Loughrea; Referee: Paul Fahy

29 September 2019; 15:00; Preliminary Quarter-final	Craughwell	1-17 - 0-16	Tynagh-Abbey/Duniry	Kenny Park, Athenry; Referee: John Keane
29 September 2019; 15:00; Preliminary Quarter-final	Niall Healy (0-10 frees), Adrian Prendergast (1-1), Thomas Monaghan (0-3), Jamie Ryan (0-2), Adam Clarke (0-1)		Shane Maloney (0-8, 7 frees); Colm Larkin (0-2), Gary McHugo (0-2), David Jordan (0-1), Padraig Breheny (0-1), Ben Moran (0-1), Padraig Robinson (0-1)	Kenny Park, Athenry; Referee: John Keane

29 September 2019; 16:45; Preliminary Quarter-final	Cappataggle	0-22 - 1-16	Clarinbridge	Kenny Park, Athenry; Referee: Liam Gordon
29 September 2019; 16:45; Preliminary Quarter-final	Alan Dolan (0-13, 9 frees), Ja Mannion (0-3), James Egan (0-2), Dan Nevin (0-1 free), Eanna Garvey (0-1), Michael Garvey (0-1), Donal Mannion (0-1)		Evan Niland (0-10, 8 frees), Michael Daly (0-5, 1 free), Mark Kennedy (1-0), Sean Kilduff (0-1)	Kenny Park, Athenry; Referee: Liam Gordon

=== Senior Quarter-finals ===
The four teams who finished first and second in the two Senior A groups play the four winners of the senior preliminary quarter finals.

12 October 2019; 14:45; Quarter-final	Turloughmore	0-21 - 0-14	Craughwell	Kenny Park, Athenry; Referee: Michael Haverty
12 October 2019; 14:45; Quarter-final	Conor Walsh (0-7, 5 frees), Daniel Loftus (0-3), Sean Loftus (0-3), Jamie Holland (0-2, 1 free), Richard Doyle (0-2), Gary Burke (0-2), Barry McDonagh (0-1), Sean Linnane (0-1)		Niall Healy (0-5 frees), Adrian Prendergast (0-2 frees), Thomas Monaghan (0-2), Mark Horan (0-1), Dean Callanan (0-1), Jamie Ryan (0-1), Shane Dolan (0-1), John Greaney (0-1)	Kenny Park, Athenry; Referee: Michael Haverty

12 October 2019; 16:30; Quarter-final	St. Thomas'	0-16 - 0-14	Tommy Larkin's	Kenny Park, Athenry; Referee: Paul Fahy
12 October 2019; 16:30; Quarter-final	Darragh Burke (0-10, 9 frees), Oisin Flannery (0-3), David Burke (0-2, 1 sideline), Conor Cooney (0-1)[2018 Galway Senior Hurling Championship		Jason Flynn (0-10, 9 frees), Kevin McHugo (0-1), Conor Gardiner (0-1), Cian Hanley (0-1), Ronan Murphy (0-1)	Kenny Park, Athenry; Referee: Paul Fahy

13 October 2019; 12:00; Quarter-final	Liam Mellows	2-16 - 0-6	Sarsfields	Kenny Park, Athenry; Referee: Christy Browne
13 October 2019; 12:00; Quarter-final	Tadhg Haran (0-11, 10 frees, 1 sideline), Ronan Elwood (1-2), Conor Kavanagh (1-1), Jack Hastings (0-2)		Niall Morrissey (0-5 frees), Ronan Quinn (0-1)	Kenny Park, Athenry; Referee: Christy Browne

13 October 2019; 16:30; Quarter-final	Cappataggle	2-18 - 0-14	Loughrea	Duggan Park, Ballinasloe; Referee: John Keane
13 October 2019; 16:30; Quarter-final	Alan Dolan (0-10, 8 frees), Donal Mannion (1-1), Michael Garvey (1-0), Ja Mannion (0-3), Dan Nevin (0-2 frees), Daniel Reddan (0-1), James Egan (0-1)		Jamie Ryan (0-8, 7 frees), Neil Keary (0-2, 1 free) Dylan Shaughnessy (0-2), Caimin Killeen (0-1), Joe Mooney (0-1)	Duggan Park, Ballinasloe; Referee: John Keane

=== Senior Semi-finals ===
27 October 2019; 13:30; Semi-final	Liam Mellows	2-21 - 1-21	Cappataggle	Kenny Park, Athenry; Referee: Liam Gordon
27 October 2019; 13:30; Semi-final	T Haran (0-13, 0-10 frees); C Kavanagh (2-0); C Elwood (0-4); J Forde (0-2); A Morrissey, R Elwood (0-1)	Report	A Dolan (0-12, 0-10 frees); J Egan (1-0); J Mannion, D Mannion (0-3); D Nevin, M Garvey, N Collins (0-1)	Kenny Park, Athenry; Referee: Liam Gordon

27 October 2019; 15:15; Semi-final	St. Thomas'	3-14 - 1-15	Turloughmore	Kenny Park, Athenry; Referee: Alan Kelly
27 October 2019; 15:15; Semi-final	Darragh Burke (0-7 feres); C Cooney (1-2, 1-0 penalty); O Flannery (1-1); B Farrell (1-0); J Regan (0-2); D Burke, B Burke (0-1)	Report	C Walsh (0-9 frees); J Holland (0-3 frees); R Badger (1-0); S Loftus (0-2); B McDonagh (0-1)	Kenny Park, Athenry; Referee: Alan Kelly

=== Senior final ===
10 November 2019; 14:30; Final	Liam Mellows	0-14 - 1-13	St. Thomas'	Pearse Stadium; Attendance: 6,740; Referee: Christy Browne (Ballinasloe)
10 November 2019; 14:30; Final	Tadhg Haran 0-9 (0-7f, 0-1 sideline), Conor Elwood 0-2, Jack Forde 0-1, Conor Kavanagh 0-1, Ronan Elwood 0-1.	Report	Eanna Burke 1-3, Darragh Burke 0-5 (0-4f), Fintan Burke 0-2, Bernard Burke 0-2, David Burke 0-1.	Pearse Stadium; Attendance: 6,740; Referee: Christy Browne (Ballinasloe)

St. Thomas':
1	James Barrett
2	Cian Mahoney
3	Sean Skehill
7	David Sherry
5	Donal Cooney
6	Shane Cooney
4	Cathal Burke
8	James Regan
9	David Burke
10	Eanna Burke
11	Darragh Burke
12	Bernard Burke
15	Oisin Flannery
14	Conor Cooney
13	Brendan Farrell
Substitutes Used:
30	Fintan Burke for Brendan Farrell (39 mins)
21	Evan Duggan for Bernard Burke (62 mins)
Manager:
Kevin Lally

Liam Mellows:
1	Kenneth Walsh
7	Cathal Reilly
3	David Collins
4	Liam O'Donovan
8	Stephen Barrett
5	Mark Hughes
6	Sean Morrissey
9	Jack Forde
10	Adrian Morrissey
11	Jack Hastings
14	Conor Elwood
17	Ronan Elwood
12	Tadhg Haran
15	Aonghus Callanan
13	Conor Kavanagh
Substitutes Used:
2	Brian Leen for Liam O'Donovan (31 mins)
37	Mike Conneeley for Aonghus Callanan (54 mins)
23	John Lee for Jack Forde (60 mins)
Manager:
Louis Mulqueen
