= 2017 Galway Senior Hurling Championship =

Annual hurling competition season

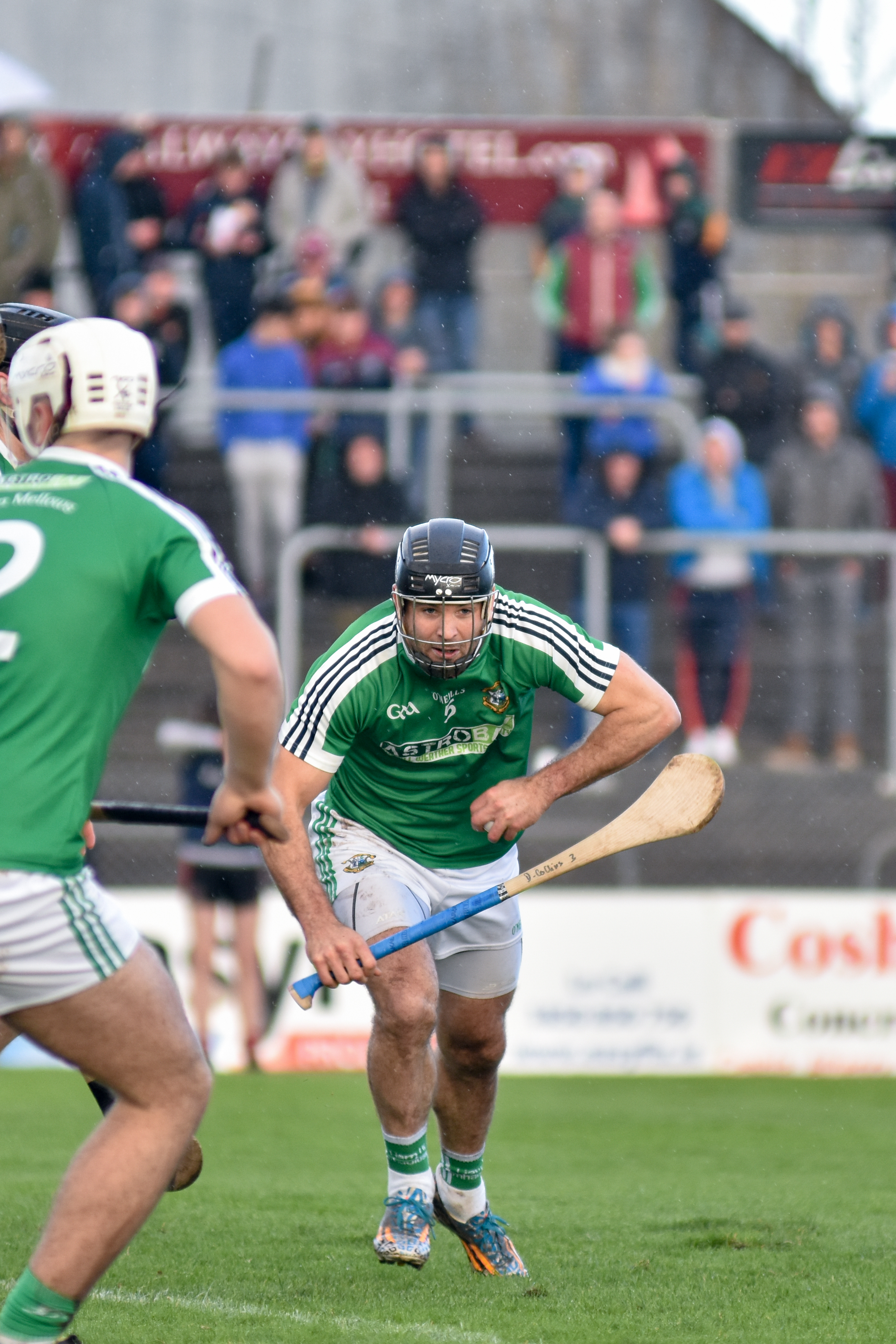

Tournament details
- County: Galway
- Year: 2017

Winners
- Champions: Liam Mellows
- Manager: Louis Mulqueen
- Captain: David Collins; Aonghus Callanan

Promotion/Relegation
- Promoted team(s): N/A
- Relegated team(s): Carnmore

The 2017 Galway Senior Hurling Championship was the 120th staging of the Galway Senior Hurling Championship since its establishment in 1887.

St. Thomas' were the reigning champions. Ahascragh-Fohenagh participated in the senior championship having been promoted from the intermediate competition in 2016.

The title was won by the Galway city based Liam Mellows who defeated Gort in the final. It was their first title in 47 years.

== Controversy ==
Turloughmore's group stage win over Portumna on 3 June 2017 was overturned by the GAA's Disputes Resolution Authority (DRA). Jamie Holland played for Turloughmore having been transferred to Cú Chulainns, Chicago two days earlier.

== Group stage ==
=== Senior A ===
Senior A consists of 12 teams divided into two groups of 6. The top two teams from each group automatically qualify for the quarter-finals. The third and fourth teams from each group play in the 2017 preliminary quarter finals. The bottom two teams from each group play-off with the losing team relegated to playing in the 2018 Senior B Section.

==== Senior A - Group 1 ====
Pos	Team	Pld	W	D	L	SF	SA	Diff	Pts
1	Liam Mellows	5	4	0	1	8-86	9-61	22	8
2	Craughwell	5	3	1	1	9-83	7-68	21	7
3	Cappataggle	5	2	2	1	8-67	3-79	3	6
4	Tommy Larkin's	5	2	0	3	7-75	7-79	-7	4
5	Mullagh	5	1	1	3	2-79	1-93	-11	3
6	Loughrea	5	1	0	4	4-86	10-86	-18	2

8 April 2017; 16:30; Round 1	Craughwell	2-14 - 0-15	Loughrea	Kenny Park, Athenry; Referee: John Keane
8 April 2017; 16:30; Round 1	Niall Healy (0-10, 7f), Shane Dolan (2-1), Adrian Cullinane (0-1), Mark Horan (0-1), Brian Callanan (0-1)		Gearoid Loughnane (0-7, 2f), Joseph Mooney (0-2), Sean Sweeney (0-2), Oisin Coyle (0-2), Neil Keary (0-1f), Johnny Coen (0-1)	Kenny Park, Athenry; Referee: John Keane

8 April 2017; 16:30; Round 1	Liam Mellows	1-22 - 3-12	Tommy Larkin's	Gort; Referee: John McDonagh
8 April 2017; 16:30; Round 1	Adrian Morrissey (0-12, 5f), Tadhg Haran (0-5, 2f), David Collins (1-1), Kevin Lee (0-2), Conor Kavanagh (0-1), Aonghus Callanan (0-1)		Jason Flynn (1-3, 1-2f), Kevin McHugo (1-2), Ronan Murphy (0-4), Conor Gardiner (0-3), Darragh Kelly (1-0)	Gort; Referee: John McDonagh

9 April 2017; 13:30; Round 1	Cappataggle	0-16 - 0-16	Mullagh	Loughrea; Referee: Ger O'Connor
9 April 2017; 13:30; Round 1	Daniel Nevin (0-6, 5f), James Egan (0-3), Jarlath Mannion (0-2), Darragh Dolan (0-1), Ronan Garvey (0-1), Damien Joyce (0-1), Alan Dolan (0-1)		Cathal Dervan (0-11, 10f), Davy Glennon (0-3), C Hardiman (0-1), Derek Hardiman (0-1)	Loughrea; Referee: Ger O'Connor

6 May 2017; 18:00; Round 2	Cappataggle	2-9 - 1-9	Tommy Larkin's	Ballinasloe
6 May 2017; 18:00; Round 2	Dan Nevin (0-4, 3f), James Skehill (1-0pen), Donal Mannion (1-0), Alan Dolan (0-2), James Egan (0-1), Jarlaith Mannion (0-1), Damien Joyce (0-1)		Jason Flynn (1-8, 1-7f), Niall Kelly (0-1)	Ballinasloe

6 May 2017; 16:30; Round 2	Liam Mellows	6-13 - 3-8	Loughrea	Kenny Park, Athenry
6 May 2017; 16:30; Round 2	Aonghus Callanan (4-0), Adrian Morrissey (0-7, 6f), Conor Kavanagh (1-2), David Fahy (1-0), Sean Morrissey (0-1f), Brian Lee (0-1), Ronan Elwood (0-1), David Collins (0-1)		Brian Keary (1-3, 2f), Johnny Coen (1-1), Johnny Maher (1-0), Neil Keary (0-2), Oisi Coyle (0-1), Jamie Ryan (0-1)	Kenny Park, Athenry

30 April 2017; 16:30; Round 2	Mullagh	1-15 - 0-16	Craughwell	Kenny Park, Athenry; Referee: Leonard Fay
30 April 2017; 16:30; Round 2	Cathal Dervan (0-8f), Ronan Glennon (1-0), Sean Hardiman (0-1), Kevin Briscoe (0-1), Conor Dervan (0-1), Craig Finnerty (0-1), Padraig Kennedy (0-1), Davy Glennon (0-1), N Cahalane (0-1)		N Healy (0-7, 5f), Thomas Monaghan (0-4), Shane Dolan (0-3), Mark Horan (0-1), Jamie Ryan (0-1)	Kenny Park, Athenry; Referee: Leonard Fay

2 June 2017; 19:00; Round 3	Craughwell	2-12 - 0-14	Liam Mellows	Kenny Park, Athenry; Referee: Gerry Donoghue
2 June 2017; 19:00; Round 3	N Healy (0-8, 7f), Fergal Healy (1-1, 1f), Shane Dolan (1-0), Thomas Monaghan (0-2), Niall Callanan (0-1)		Adrian Morrissey (0-5f), Ronan Elwood (0-3, 1f), Kevin Lee (0-3), David Collins (0-1), Enda Fallon (0-1), Tadhg Haran (0-1f)	Kenny Park, Athenry; Referee: Gerry Donoghue

3 June 2017; 18:30; Round 3	Cappataggle	1-18 - 0-16	Loughrea	Duggan Park, Ballinasloe; Referee: Seamus Moran
3 June 2017; 18:30; Round 3	James Egan (0-9, 5f), Ronan Garvey (1-2), Paul Claffey (0-3f), Darragh Dolan (0-1), Jarlaith Mannion (0-1), Damien Joyce (0-1)		Neil Keary (0-9, 8f), Jamie Ryan (0-2), Alan Cormican (0-1), Joe Mooney (0-1), Johnny Maher (0-1)	Duggan Park, Ballinasloe; Referee: Seamus Moran

4 June 2017; 14:00; Round 3	Tommy Larkin's	1-19 - 0-13	Mullagh	Duggan Park, Ballinasloe; Referee: John Keane
4 June 2017; 14:00; Round 3	Jason Flynn (0-9, 3f), Kevin McHugo (1-2), Colm Flynn (0-3), Conor Gardiner (0-3), Darragh Kelly (0-2)		Padraig Kennedy (0-8f), C Hardiman (0-2), Davy Glennon (0-2), Ronan Glennon (0-1)	Duggan Park, Ballinasloe; Referee: John Keane

8 July 2017; 15:30; Round 4	Loughrea	0-21 - 0-20	Mullagh	Duggan Park, Ballinasloe; Referee: Sean Moran
8 July 2017; 15:30; Round 4	Neil Keary (0-13, 10f), Jamie Ryan (0-3), Johnny Maher (0-2), Brian Keary (0-1), Sean O'Brien (0-1), Martin McManus (0-1)		Padraig Kennedy (0-10, 8f), Davy Glennon (0-4), C Hardiman (0-2), Niall Cahalane (0-2); Sean Hardiman (0-1), Ronan Glennon (0-1)	Duggan Park, Ballinasloe; Referee: Sean Moran

8 July 2017; 17:00; Round 4	Liam Mellows	1-16 - 0-14	Cappataggle	Loughrea; Referee: J Larkin
8 July 2017; 17:00; Round 4	Ronan Elwood (0-5f), David Collins (0-3), Conor Elwood (1-0), Conor Kavanagh (0-2), Conor Hynes (0-2), Tadhg Haran (0-2), Aoenghus Callanan (0-2)		Dan Nevin (0-3), Donal Mannion (0-3), James Skehill (0-2f), Darragh Dolan (0-1), Ronan Garvey (0-1), Stephen Creaven (0-1), Damien Joyce (0-1), Dan Reddan (0-1), James Egan (0-1f)	Loughrea; Referee: J Larkin

8 July 2017; 18:30; Round 4	Craughwell	4-19 - 1-14	Tommy Larkin's	Gort; Referee: John Keane
8 July 2017; 18:30; Round 4	Jamie Ryan (2-2), Niall Healy (0-7, 4f), Fergal Healy (1-2), Shane Dolan (1-1), Thomas Monaghan (0-2), Matthew Freaney (0-1), Alan Callanan (0-1), Niall Donoghue (0-1), Cian Larkin (0-1)		Jason Flynn (0-10, 9f), Kevin McHugo (1-2), Colm Flynn (0-1), Conor Gardiner (0-1)	Gort; Referee: John Keane

17 September 2017; 17:30; Round 5	Craughwell	1-22 - 5-10	Cappataggle	Kenny Park, Athenry; Referee: Shane Hynes
17 September 2017; 17:30; Round 5	Niall Healy (0-15, 10f), Cian Larkin (1-0), Stephen Hynes (0-2), Niall Callanan (0-2), Fergal Healy (0-2), Thomas Monaghan (0-1)		Stephen Creaven (2-8, 8f), Damien Joyce (1-0), James Egan (1-0), Ronan Garvey (1-0), Darragh Dolan (0-1), Jarlaith Mannion (0-1)	Kenny Park, Athenry; Referee: Shane Hynes

17 September 2017; 17:30; Round 5	Liam Mellows	0-21 - 1-15	Mullagh	Loughrea; Referee: Christy Browne
17 September 2017; 17:30; Round 5	Adrian Morrissey (0-10, 9f), Tadhg Haran (0-6, 1sl), Kevin Lee (0-2), Conor Hynes (0-1), Stephen Barrett (0-1), Jack Forde (0-1)		Alan Whyte (1-1), Conor Hardiman (0-3), Sean Hardiman (0-2), Jason Nevin (0-2), Davy Glennon (0-2), Finnian Coone (0-2f); Cathal Kennedy (0-1), Niall Cahalane (0-1); Conor Dervan (0-1f)	Loughrea; Referee: Christy Browne

17 September 2017; 17:30; Round 5	Tommy Larkin's	0-21 - 1-16	Loughrea	Duggan Park, Ballinasloe; Referee: John Keane
17 September 2017; 17:30; Round 5	Jason Flynn (0-10, 7f), Conor Gardiner (0-5), Darragh Kelly (0-2), Cathal Kelly (0-2), Kevin Hooban (0-1), Kevin McHugo (0-1)		Neil Keary (0-8f), Jamie Ryan (0-4), Johnny Coen (1-0 pen), Joe Mooney (0-2), Brian Mahony (0-1), Emmet Mahony (0-1)	Duggan Park, Ballinasloe; Referee: John Keane

==== Senior A - Group 2 ====
Pos	Team	Pld	W	D	L	SF	SA	Diff	Pts
1	Sarsfields	5	3	0	2	5-80	3-78	8	6
2	Gort	5	3	0	2	6-80	5-81	2	6
3	St. Thomas'	5	3	0	2	1-89	5-74	3	6
4	Portumna	5	2	1	2	7-92	7-79	13	5
5	Turloughmore	5	3	0	2	3-70	4-82	-15	4
6	Padraig Pearse's	5	0	1	4	5-62	3-79	-11	1

- Game between Turloughmore and Portumna has been declared null and void.

8 April 2017; 18:00; Round 1	Padraig Pearse's	2-13 - 1-16	Portumna	Ballinasloe; Referee: Sean Moran
8 April 2017; 18:00; Round 1	Tomas Flannery (0-7, 6f), Cyril Donnelan (1-2), Conor Fahey (1-0), Shane Raftery (0-2f), Ronan Bellew (0-1), Cormac Ward (0-1)		Joe Canning (0-8, 6f), Damien Hayes (1-2), Ronan O'Meara (0-3, 2f), Kevin Hayes (0-1), Jack Canning (0-1), Ivan Canning (0-1)	Ballinasloe; Referee: Sean Moran

9 April 2017; 18:00; Round 1	Sarsfields	1-17 - 0-15	Gort	Kenny Park, Athenry; Referee: Shane Hynes
9 April 2017; 18:00; Round 1	Niall Morrissey (0-8f), Kerill Wade (1-1), Kevin Cooney (0-2), Noel Kelly (0-2), Joseph Cooney (0-1), Jeffery Lawless (0-1), Eric Kenny (0-1), Ian Skehill (0-1)		Greg Lally (0-5f), Aiden Helebert (0-5f), Richie Cummins (0-2), Albert Mullins (0-1), Michael Mullins (0-1)	Kenny Park, Athenry; Referee: Shane Hynes

8 April 2017; 18:00; Round 1	Turloughmore	1-13 - 0-15	St. Thomas'	Kenny Park, Athenry; Referee: Eoin Shaughnessy
8 April 2017; 18:00; Round 1	Jamie Holland (0-11, 9f, 1sl), Barry McDonagh (0-2), Matthew Keating (1-0),		Conor Cooney (0-8, 7f), Kenneth Burke (0-3), Brendan Farrell (0-2), David Burke (0-1), Darragh Burke (0-1)	Kenny Park, Athenry; Referee: Eoin Shaughnessy

6 May 2017; 18:00; Round 2	Gort	1-19 - 0-13	Turloughmore	Kenny Park, Athenry
6 May 2017; 18:00; Round 2	Richie Cummins (0-4), Jack Commins (1-1), Aidan Helebert (0-3f), Aidan Harte (0-3), Greg Lally (0-2f), Pakie Lally (0-2), Paul Killilea (0-2), Michael Mullins (0-1), Wayne Walsh (0-1)		Jamie Holland (0-5, 4f), Barry McDonagh (0-2), Conor Shaughnessy (0-1f), Richard Doyle (0-1), Matthew Keating (0-1), Sean Linnane (0-1), Sean Loftus (0-1), Ronan Badger (0-1)	Kenny Park, Athenry

7 May 2017; 13:30; Round 2	Portumna	3-17 - 1-11	Sarsfields	Loughrea
7 May 2017; 13:30; Round 2	Joe Canning (2-9, 1-6f, 0-1 sideline), Jack Canning (1-1), Ronan O'Meara (0-3), Kevin Hayes (0-1), Ivan Canning (0-1), Paddy Dolphin (0-1), Oisin Royston (0-1)		Niall Morrissey (0-4f), Kerrill Wade (1-1), Kevin Cooney (0-2), Alan Ward (0-1), Joseph Cooney (0-1), Eric Kenny (0-1), Jeffrey Lawless (0-1)	Loughrea

7 May 2017; 16:30; Round 2	St. Thomas'	0-19 - 1-11	Padraig Pearse's	Ballinasloe
7 May 2017; 16:30; Round 2	Darragh Burke (0-7, 4f), Eanna Burke (0-5), James Regan (0-3), Patrick Skehill (0-1f), Gary Moylan (0-1), David Burke (0-1), Fintan Burke (0-1)		Cyril Donnellan (1-2), Thomas Flannery (0-4f), Colm Raftery (0-2), Ronan Bellew (0-2), Sean Hardiman (0-1)	Ballinasloe

3 June 2017; 13:00; Round 3	Turloughmore	Null and Void; 2-17 - 0-18	Portumna	Duggan Park, Ballinasloe; Referee: Shane Hynes
3 June 2017; 13:00; Round 3	Ronan Badger (1-5, 4f, 1-0 pen), Matthew Keating (1-1), Jamie Holland (0-4, 2f, 1sl), Sean Linnane (0-3), Sean Loftus (0-2), Daithi Burke (0-1), Fergal Moore (0-1)		Joe Canning (0-9, 7f), Damien Hayes (0-3), Ollie Canning (0-2), Ronan O'Meara (0-2), Ivan Canning (0-1), Kevin Hayes (0-1)	Duggan Park, Ballinasloe; Referee: Shane Hynes

- Turloughmore forfeited the fixture for playing an ineligible player without award of the game to Portumna. See section "Controversy"

4 June 2017; 15:30; Round 3	Sarsfields	0-17 - 0-15	Padraig Pearse's	Duggan Park, Ballinasloe; Referee: Peter Murphy
4 June 2017; 15:30; Round 3	Niall Morrissey (0-13f), Joseph Cooney (0-2), Kerrill Wade (0-1), Kevin Cooney (0-1)		Ronan Bellew (0-8, 6f), Thomas Flannery (0-3), Colm Raftery (0-1), Kerrill Hardiman (0-1), Emmet Ward (0-1)	Duggan Park, Ballinasloe; Referee: Peter Murphy

4 June 2017; 18:00; Round 3	Gort	2-18 - 0-14	St. Thomas'	Kenny Park, Athenry; Referee: Alan Kelly
4 June 2017; 18:00; Round 3	Aiden Helebert (0-12, 8f), Jack Commins (1-1), Richie Cummins (1-0), Greg Lally (0-1f), Aidan Harte (0-1), Kaelan Higgins (0-1), Paul Killilea (0-1), Niall Forde (0-1)		Darragh Burke (0-6, 5f), Conor Cooney (0-3f), Kenneth Burke (0-2), Eanna Burke (0-1), Damien Finnerty (0-1), David Burke (0-1)	Kenny Park, Athenry; Referee: Alan Kelly

9 July 2017; 17:30; Round 4	St. Thomas'	1-21 - 1-14	Portumna	Kenny Park, Athenry; Referee: Leonard Fay
9 July 2017; 17:30; Round 4	Eanna Burke (1-6), Conor Cooney (0-7, 4f), Darragh Burke (0-4, 2f), Kenneth Burke (0-2), Brendan Farrell (0-1), Bernard Burke (0-1)		Ronan O'Meara (0-9, 7f), Jack Canning (1-1), Andy Smith (0-2f), Joe Keane (0-1), Kevin Hayes (0-1)	Kenny Park, Athenry; Referee: Leonard Fay

9 July 2017; 19:00; Round 4	Sarsfields	3-17 - 0-11	Turloughmore	Kenny Park, Athenry; Referee: Eoin Shaughnessy
9 July 2017; 19:00; Round 4	Niall Morrissey (0-8, 6f), Kevin Cooney (1-2), Eric Kenny (1-1), Jeffery Lawless (1-0), Joseph Cooney (0-2), Ian Kelly (0-1), Ivan Kenny (0-1), Ian Fox (0-1), Kieran Kelly (0-1)		Ronan Badger (0-5f), Sean Linnane (0-2), Darren O'Shaughnessy (0-2f), Sean Loftus (0-1), Richard Doyle (0-1)	Kenny Park, Athenry; Referee: Eoin Shaughnessy

9 July 2017; 19:00; Round 4	Gort	2-11 - 2-10	Padraig Pearse's	Duggan Park, Ballinasloe; Referee: Liam Gordon
9 July 2017; 19:00; Round 4	Jack Grealish (1-1), Greg Lally (0-3f), Paul Killilea (1-0), Jason Grealish (0-3, 1sl), Aidan Harte (0-2), Pakie Lally (0-1), Martin Nestor (0-1)		Ronan Bellew (1-2, 2f), Shane Raftrey (1-1f), Tomas Flannery (0-3f), Jimmy Gelston (0-1), Sean Hardiman (0-1), Ronan O'Neill (0-1), Cyril Donnelan (0-1)	Duggan Park, Ballinasloe; Referee: Liam Gordon

16 September 2017; 17:30; Round 5	Turloughmore	0-16 - 0-13	Padraig Pearse's	Duggan Park, Ballinasloe
16 September 2017; 17:30; Round 5	Ronan Badger (0-4f), Sean Linnane (0-3), Vincent Doyle (0-2), Fergal Moore (0-2), Matthew Keating (0-2), Brian Murphy (0-2, 1f), Kevin Hussey (0-1)		Cyril Donnelan (0-5, 2f), Thomas Flannery (0-2, 1f), Cormac Raftery (0-1), Kerrill Hardiman (0-1), Ronan Bellew (0-1), Cormac Ward (0-1), L Murphy (0-1), Garreth Lally (0-1)	Duggan Park, Ballinasloe

16 September 2017; 17:30; Round 5	St. Thomas'	0-20 - 0-18	Sarsfields	Duggan Park, Athenry; Referee: Paul Fahy
16 September 2017; 17:30; Round 5	Darragh Burke (0-6, 3f), Eanna Burke (0-3), Conor Cooney (0-3), David Burke (0-2), Brendan Farrell (0-2), Shane Cooney (0-2, 1f), Bernard Burke (0-1), Gerard Kelly (0-1)		Niall Morrissey (0-12f), Ian Fox (0-2), Joseph Cooney (0-2), Noel Kelly (0-1), Kevin Cooney (0-1)	Duggan Park, Athenry; Referee: Paul Fahy

16 September 2017; 17:30; Round 5	Portumna	2-24 - 1-17	Gort	Loughrea; Referee: Alan Kelly
16 September 2017; 17:30; Round 5	Joe Canning (0-15, 10f), Jack Canning (1-3), Kevin Hayes (1-3), Damien Hayes (0-2), Ronan O'Meara (0-1)		Aiden Helebert (0-11, 9f), Richie Cummins (1-2, 1f), Micheal Mullins (0-1), Paul Killilea (0-1), Albert Mullins (0-1), Keith Killilea (0-1)	Loughrea; Referee: Alan Kelly

==== Senior A - Relegation ====
28 October 2017; 13:00; Senior A - Relegation	Loughrea	1-19 - 1-16	Turloughmore	Duggan Park, Ballinasloe; Referee: Peter Campbell

4 November 2017; 13:00; Senior A - Relegation	Mullagh	1-17 - 0-8	Pádraig Pearses	Duggan Park, Ballinasloe

=== Senior B ===
Senior B consists of 12 teams divided into two groups of 6. The winners of each group qualify for the 2017 preliminary quarter finals and compete in the 2018 Senior A competition. The four second and third placed teams play-off with the two winners also qualifying for the 2017 preliminary quarter finals.

==== Senior B - Group 1 ====
Pos	Team	Pld	W	D	L	SF	SA	Diff	Pts
1	Castlegar	5	5	0	0	10-81	3-69	33	10
2	Clarinbridge	5	3	1	1	3-86	4-57	23	7
3	Tynagh-Abbey/Duniry	5	2	1	2	9-79	3-74	23	5
4	Beagh	5	2	0	3	7-81	6-61	23	4
5	Ardrahan	5	2	0	3	8-70	6-74	2	4
6	Carnmore	5	0	0	5	2-48	16-110	-104	0

7 May 2017; 13:30; Round 1	Beagh	4-22 - 0-6	Carnmore	Kenny Park, Athenry
7 May 2017; 13:30; Round 1	Adrian Tuohy (3-3, 0-2f), Joe Gantly (1-4), Thomas McKeown (0-4), John Moylan (0-3), Kevin Keehan (1f), Padraic Landers, Evan Hunt (0-2) each, Rory Gantly (0-1f)		Barry Hanley (0-6, 4f)	Kenny Park, Athenry

8 April 2017; 18:00; Round 1	Ardrahan	0-16 - 1-12	Tynagh-Abbey/Duniry	Loughrea; Referee: Gerry Donoghue
8 April 2017; 18:00; Round 1	Ger Hennelly (0-12, 0-10 frees); P McCrann, J Kennedy, C Fahy, Johnny Glynn (0-1)		Shane Maloney (0-6, 0-3 frees); Padraig Brehony (0-4); Paul Killeen (1-0 free); Ronan Madden (0-2)	Loughrea; Referee: Gerry Donoghue

8 April 2017; 18:00; Round 1	Castlegar	0-15 - 0-12	Clarinbridge	Pearse Stadium; Referee: Alan Kelly
8 April 2017; 18:00; Round 1	Ger Farragher (0-9, 0-7 frees, 0-1 '65); Jack Coyne (0-2); T Mannion, Enda Concannon, S Connolly, A Mooney (0-1)		Evan Niland (0-7, 0-6 frees); Conor Sammon (0-2); P Foley, E Murphy, M Daly, A Armstrong (0-1)	Pearse Stadium; Referee: Alan Kelly

22 April 2017; 18:00; Round 2	Clarinbridge	1-27 - 1-7	Carnmore	Kenny Park, Athenry; Referee: Liam Gordon
22 April 2017; 18:00; Round 2	E Niland (0-11, 0-5 frees); E Forde (0-6); C Salmon (1-1); P Foley, B Keane (0-3); M Daly (0-2); T Jakeman (0-1)		B Handley (1-6, 0-5 frees); K Killilea, C Fahy (0-1)	Kenny Park, Athenry; Referee: Liam Gordon

7 May 2017; 12:00; Round 2	Castlegar	2-12 - 1-14	Tynagh-Abbey/Duniry	Loughrea
7 May 2017; 12:00; Round 2	Enda Concannon (2-1), Ger Farragher (0-3, 2f), Sean Connolly (0-3), Tomas Mannion (0-2), Aaron Tummon, Eamom Ruane, Mike Fahy (0-1) each		Shane Maloney (0-6, 5f), Paul Gordon (1-2), Padraig Brehony, Niall Moloney (0-2) each, Padraig Robinson, Garry Mchugo (0-1) each	Loughrea

30 April 2017; 18:00; Round 2	Beagh	2-16 - 2-10	Ardrahan	Kenny Park, Athenry; Referee: John Keane
30 April 2017; 18:00; Round 2	R Gantley (0-7 frees); A Tuohy (1-2, 1-0 penalty, 0-1 free); T Fallon (1-1); P Landers, J Gantley (0-2); T McKeown, J Moylan (0-1)		L Forde (1-1); C Fahy (1-0); G Hennelly (0-3, 0-1 free); M Callanan (0-3 frees); G Forde, K Murphy, P McCann (0-1)	Kenny Park, Athenry; Referee: John Keane

3 June 2017; 17:00; Round 3	Castlegar	2-16 - 1-17	Beagh	Loughrea; Referee: Leonard Fay
3 June 2017; 17:00; Round 3	G Farragher (0-6, 0-5 frees); E Concannon (2-0); A Tummon, S Connolly, J Coyne (0-2); D Higgins, D Barry, M Fahy, K Keane (0-1)		R Gantley (0-7, 0-6 frees, 0-1 '65); P Landers, A Tuohy (0-3); T Fallon (1-0); J Moylan (0-2); J Diviney, E Mahon (0-1)	Loughrea; Referee: Leonard Fay

3 June 2017; 17:00; Round 3	Tynagh-Abbey/Duniry	2-14 - 1-17	Clarinbridge	Kenny Park, Athenry; Referee: Eoin Shaughnessy
3 June 2017; 17:00; Round 3	S Maloney (0-7, 0-5 frees); P Breheny (1-3); M Dervan (1-2, 0-1 free); N Maloney (0-2)		E Niland (0-8, 0-6 frees); M Daly (0-5, 0-1 free); T Jakeman (1-1); B Keane (0-2); S Kilduff (0-1)	Kenny Park, Athenry; Referee: Eoin Shaughnessy

4 June 2017; 16:30; Round 3	Ardrahan	3-18 - 1-11	Carnmore	Kenny Park, Athenry; Referee: Ger O'Connor
4 June 2017; 16:30; Round 3	G Hennelly (1-11, 0-5 frees); C Fahy (1-1); M Callanan (0-4); M Lynskey (1-0); I Tannian (0-2)		B Hanley (0-6, 0-5 frees); K Killilea (1-2); G Hanley, C Fahy, T Cogley (0-1)	Kenny Park, Athenry; Referee: Ger O'Connor

8 July 2017; 18:30; Round 4	Clarinbridge	0-16 - 0-11	Beagh	Kenny Park, Athenry; Referee: John McDonagh
8 July 2017; 18:30; Round 4	Evan Niland (0-7, 0-5 frees); A Armstrong (0-2); M Daly (0-2, 0-1 sideline); Cian Salmon (0-2); B Keane, P Foley, A Monaghan (0-1)		Tommy McKeown (0-3); K Keehan (0-3, 0-1 free); Rory Gantley (0-3 frees); Adrian Tuohy, Padraic Landers (0-1)	Kenny Park, Athenry; Referee: John McDonagh

8 July 2017; 18:30; Round 4	Castlegar	1-21 - 1-16	Ardrahan	Loughrea; Referee: Seamus Moran
8 July 2017; 18:30; Round 4	Ger Farragher (0-14, 0-10 frees, 0-1 sideline); J Coyne (1-2); M Fahy, E Concannon (0-2); Dean Higgins (0-1)		Ger Hennelly (0-9, 0-8 frees); C Fahy (1-1); Maurice Callanan (0-3); G Forde, Iarla Tannian, J Glynn (0-1)	Loughrea; Referee: Seamus Moran

9 July 2017; 17:30; Round 4	Tynagh-Abbey/Duniry	3-26 - 0-14	Carnmore	Duggan Park, Ballinasloe; Referee: P Campbell
9 July 2017; 17:30; Round 4	Shane Moloney (0-12, 0-6 frees); Padraig Brehony (1-3); B Moran (1-2); N Maloney (0-4); T Gordan (1-1); P Gordan (0-3); J Shiel (0-1)		B Hanley (0-10, 0-8 frees); K Killilea (0-4);	Duggan Park, Ballinasloe; Referee: P Campbell

17 September 2017; 13:30; Round 5	Castlegar	5-17 - 0-10	Carnmore	Pearse Stadium; Referee: Richard McNicholas
17 September 2017; 13:30; Round 5	E Concannon (2-2); Ger Farragher (1-4, 0-3 frees); S Connolloy (1-3); J Coyne (1-3, 0-1 free); Dean Higgins (0-2); D Barry, T Mannion, A Tummon (0-1)		B Hanley (0-5 frees); Kevin Killilea (0-3 frees); M Caulfield, D Cummins (0-1)	Pearse Stadium; Referee: Richard McNicholas

17 September 2017; 13:30; Round 5	Clarinbridge	1-14 - 2-10	Ardrahan	Kenny Park, Athenry; Referee: Liam Gordon
17 September 2017; 13:30; Round 5	M Daly (0-6); Evan Niland (0-6, 0-5 frees); Cian Salmon (1-0); P Foley, S Forde (0-1)		C Fahy (1-1); Ger Hennelly (0-4, 0-3 frees, 0-1 '65); Jason Kennedy (1-0); L Forde, Maurice Callanan (0-2); C Walsh (0-1)	Kenny Park, Athenry; Referee: Liam Gordon

17 September 2017; 13:30; Round 5	Tynagh-Abbey/Duniry	2-13 - 0-15	Beagh	Loughrea; Referee: Seamus Moran
17 September 2017; 13:30; Round 5	Shane Maloney (1-9, 0-8 frees); P Brehony (1-0); T Gordon (0-2); N Maloney, Paul Gordon (0-1) each		Rory Gantley (0-7, 0-6 frees, 0-1 '65); J Moylan, Joe Gantley (0-3); Kevin Keehan (0-2 frees)	Loughrea; Referee: Seamus Moran

==== Senior B - Group 2 ====
Pos	Team	Pld	W	D	L	SF	SA	Diff	Pts
1	Kilnadeema-Leitrim	5	4	0	1	8-83	6-79	20	8
2	Killimordaly	5	3	1	1	3-88	6-76	3	7
3	Athenry	5	2	2	1	6-76	1-66	-25	6
4	Moycullen	5	2	1	2	5-74	4-77	0	5
5	Ahascragh-Fohenagh	5	2	0	3	3-62	12-67	-23	4
6	Abbeyknockmoy	5	0	0	5	4-71	5-81	-15	0

8 April 2017; 16:30; Round 1	Moycullen	0-13 - 0-13	Athenry	Pearse Stadium
8 April 2017; 16:30; Round 1	E Noone (0-7, 0-3 frees, 0-1 sideline); N Mannion (0-5, 0-3 frees, 0-1 '65); V Faherty (0-1)		Ronan Hardiman (0-7, 0-6 frees); J Divilly, M Hannon, C Keane, M Mullins, Cian Burke, Conor Caulfield (0-1)	Pearse Stadium

9 April 2017; 18:00; Round 1	Ahascragh-Fohenagh	2-15 - 0-11	Killimordaly	Ballinasloe; Referee: Liam Gordon
9 April 2017; 18:00; Round 1	Cathal Mannion (1-11, 0-8 frees); M Kelly (1-0); R Kelly (0-2); Padraig Mannion, S Kelly (0-1)		Brian Concannon (0-7, 0-4 frees); David Concannon, P Madden, Iomar Creaven (0-1); Brian Burke (0-1 free)	Ballinasloe; Referee: Liam Gordon

9 April 2017; 16:30; Round 1	Kilnadeema-Leitrim	0-16 - 0-15	Abbeyknockmoy	Ballinasloe; Referee: Peter Campbell
9 April 2017; 16:30; Round 1	Brian Molloy (0-8, 0-6 frees, 0-1 '65); T Molloy (0-2, 0-1 free); S Lawless (0-2); D Herlihy, T Tierney, J Kenny, D Towolwai (0-1)		Paul Flaherty (0-9, 0-4 frees, 0-1 '65); Brian Flaherty (0-3); P Cooley, D Mullins, J Flaherty (0-1)	Ballinasloe; Referee: Peter Campbell

7 May 2017; 18:00; Round 2	Kilnadeema-Leitrim	2-16 - 1-12	Ahascragh-Fohenagh	Ballinasloe
7 May 2017; 18:00; Round 2	Brian Molloy (1-8, 6f), Gary Curley (0-4), Shane Lawless (1-0), Dylan Towolawi (0-2), David Tierney, Jack Kenny (0-1) each		Cathal Mannion (0-7, 4f, 1'65), Padraig Mannion (0-3f), Emmet Brennan (1-0), Eoghan Delaney (0-2)	Ballinasloe

22 April 2017; 16:30; Round 2	Athenry	0-15 - 0-15	Killimordaly	Kenny Park, Athenry; Referee: Mike Conway
22 April 2017; 16:30; Round 2	R Hardiman (0-8, 0-7 frees); C Keane (0-4, 0-3 frees); M Hannon, C Burke, C Caulfield (0-1)		B Concannon (0-8, 0-6 frees); E Ryan (0-3); K Kennedy, B Burke, I Creaven, P Madden (0-1)	Kenny Park, Athenry; Referee: Mike Conway

6 May 2017; 16:00; Round 2	Moycullen	1-15 - 0-16	Abbeyknockmoy	Pearse Stadium
6 May 2017; 16:00; Round 2	Eanna Noone (0-8, 5f, 1'65), Seamus Conneely (1-0), Niall Mannion (0-2, 1f), Conor Bohan (0-2), Robert Molloy, Gary Bohan, Anraoi Whyte (0-1) each		Paul Flaherty (0-10, 8f, 1'65) Eoin Blade (0-3), Brian Flaherty (0-2), Daniel Mullins (0-1)	Pearse Stadium

3 June 2017; 14:00; Round 3	Ahascragh-Fohenagh	2-16 - 4-5	Abbeyknockmoy	Kenny Park, Athenry; Referee: John McDonagh
3 June 2017; 14:00; Round 3	C Mannion (0-11, 0-4 frees); R Kelly (2-0); S Bleahene (0-3); P Mannion (0-2)		P Flaherty (2-3, 2-2 frees); D Rooney (1-0); E Blade (0-2)	Kenny Park, Athenry; Referee: John McDonagh

3 June 2017; 17:00; Round 3	Kilnadeema-Leitrim	1-24 - 2-10	Athenry	Duggan Park, Ballinasloe; Referee: Joe Larkin
3 June 2017; 17:00; Round 3	B Molloy (0-9, 0-7 frees, 0-1 '65); S Lawless (1-5); G Curley (0-3); S Molloy, J Kenny, D Tierney (0-2); D Herlihy (0-1)		C Burke (1-4, 0-2 frees, 0-1 '65); J Diviley (1-3); R Hardiman (0-3)	Duggan Park, Ballinasloe; Referee: Joe Larkin

3 June 2017; 19:00; Round 3	Killimordaly	1-17 - 0-14	Moycullen	Pearse Stadium; Referee: Paul Fahy
3 June 2017; 19:00; Round 3	B Burke (0-11, 0-8 frees); I Creaven (1-0); D Concannon, E Ryan (0-2); A Lawless, B Concannon (0-1)		E Noone (0-8, 0-3 frees, 0-1 '65); A Whyte, S Conneely (0-2); V Faherty, N Mannion (0-1)	Pearse Stadium; Referee: Paul Fahy

8 July 2017; 17:00; Round 4	Athenry	1-18 - 0-15	Abbeyknockmoy	Duggan Park, Ballinasloe; Referee: Christopher Browne
8 July 2017; 17:00; Round 4	Cian Burke (0-12, 0-8 frees); C Caulfield (1-1); R Hardiman (0-2); P Hannon, L Howley, D Fahy (0-1)		Paul Flaherty (0-10, 0-6 frees); Eoin Blade (0-4); F Garvey (0-1)	Duggan Park, Ballinasloe; Referee: Christopher Browne

8 July 2017; 17:00; Round 4	Moycullen	3-15 - 1-10	Ahascragh-Fohenagh	Kenny Park, Athenry; Referee: P Fahy
8 July 2017; 17:00; Round 4	N Mannion (2-3); E Noone (0-6 frees); C Bohan (1-1); A Whyte (0-2); M Donohue, C Hurney, S Conneely (0-1)		S Bleahen (1-2); M Kelly (0-5, 0-3 frees, 0-1 '65); Padraig Mannion (0-2 frees); F Donnellan (0-1)	Kenny Park, Athenry; Referee: P Fahy

8 July 2017; 18:30; Round 4	Killimordaly	2-25 - 3-16	Kilnadeema-Leitrim	Duggan Park, Ballinasloe; Referee: Michael Curley
8 July 2017; 18:30; Round 4	B Burke (0-14, 0-10 frees); B Concannon (0-3); Iomar Creaven, P Madden (1-0); S Concannon, D Cooney, Eanna Ryan, David Earls (0-2)		Brian Molloy (1-6, 1-0 penalty, 0-5 frees, 0-1 '65); Dylan Towolawi (1-2); J Kenny (0-3); Shane Lawless (1-0); D Herlihy, M Lynch (0-2); G Curley (0-1)	Duggan Park, Ballinasloe; Referee: Michael Curley

17 September 2017; 12:00; Round 5	Kilnadeema-Leitrim	2-21 - 1-17	Moycullen	Kenny Park, Athenry
17 September 2017; 12:00; Round 5	Brian Molloy (0-11, 0-7 frees); G Curley (1-3); Tom Tierney (0-3); M Lynch (1-0); Dylan Towolawi, D Herlihy (0-2)		E Noone (0-6 frees); A Whyte (1-2); N Mannion (0-3, 0-2 frees); A Jackson (0-2); C Bohan, K O'Donovan, S Conneely, C Noone (0-1)	Kenny Park, Athenry

17 September 2017; 12:00; Round 5	Killimordaly	0-20 - 1-16	Abbeyknockmoy	Duggan Park, Ballinasloe; Referee: Derek Kelly
17 September 2017; 12:00; Round 5	Brian Burke (0-15, 0-12 frees, 0-1 '65); I Creaven (0-2); P Madden, D Concannon (0-1); B Concannon (0-1 free)		Paul Flaherty (1-9, 1-8 frees); Brian Flaherty (0-3, 0-1 free); Damien Rooney, P Cooley, J Flaherty, Eoin Blade (0-1)	Duggan Park, Ballinasloe; Referee: Derek Kelly

17 September 2017; 12:00; Round 5	Athenry	3-20 - 0-9	Ahascragh-Fohenagh	Loughrea; Referee: Ger O'Connor
17 September 2017; 12:00; Round 5	Cian Burke (0-8, 0-3 frees); Tom Flynn (2-1); David Donoghue (1-2); M Hannon (0-3); R Hardiman (0-2); Conor Burke, P Hannon, C O'Dwyer, C Keane (0-1)		Cathal Mannion (0-6, 0-5 frees); Padraic Mannion (0-1 free); L Tully, F Donnellon (0-1)	Loughrea; Referee: Ger O'Connor

==== Senior B - playoffs ====
The second team in Senior B Group 1 plays the third team in Senior B Group 2 and the third team in Senior B Group 1 plays the second team in Senior B Group 2. The two winning teams qualify for the 2017 preliminary quarter finals.

24 September 2017; 15:00; Senior B Playoff	Clarinbridge	1-18 - 1-8	Athenry	Kenny Park, Athenry; Referee: John McDonagh
24 September 2017; 15:00; Senior B Playoff	Evan Niland (0-12, 0-10 frees, 0-1 '65); Cian Salmon (1-2); M Daly (0-2); P Foley, N Armstrong (0-1)		Cian Burke (1-4, 0-2 frees, 0-1 sideline); L Howley, David Donoghue, D Fahy (0-1); R Hardiman (0-1 free);	Kenny Park, Athenry; Referee: John McDonagh

24 September 2017; 16:30; Senior B Playoff	Killimordaly	2-18 - 0-23	Tynagh-Abbey/Duniry	Kenny Park, Athenry; Referee: John Keane
24 September 2017; 16:30; Senior B Playoff	B Burke (0-10, 0-9 frees); B Concannon, E Ryan (1-2); D Cooney (0-2); D Shehill, T Madden (0-1)		S Maloney (0-12, 0-7 frees, 0-1 sideline); P Breheny (0-4); J Conroy, T Gordan (0-2); K Moloney, S Farrell, N Maloney (0-1)	Kenny Park, Athenry; Referee: John Keane

==== Senior B - Relegation ====
The relegated team will play in the Intermediate Championship in 2018.

30 September 2017; 15:00; Senior B Relegation	Abbeyknockmoy	0-17 - 0-11	Carnmore	Pearse Stadium

== Knockout stage ==
=== Preliminary Quarter-finals ===
14 October 2017; 14:30; Preliminary Quarter-final	Killimordaly	1-19 - 2-15	St Thomas'	Kenny Park, Athenry; Referee: Leonard Fay
14 October 2017; 14:30; Preliminary Quarter-final	B Burke (0-10 frees); B Concannon (1-2); T Madden (0-5); E Ryan (0-2)		C Cooney (1-8, 0-6 frees, 1-0 penalty); F Burke (1-0); B Burke, David Burke (0-2); S Cooney, B Farrell, K Burke (0-1)	Kenny Park, Athenry; Referee: Leonard Fay

14 October 2017; 16:00; Preliminary Quarter-final	Portumna	4-21 - 2-19	Castlegar	Kenny Park, Athenry; Referee: Liam Gordon
14 October 2017; 16:00; Preliminary Quarter-final	Jack Canning (2-2); K Hayes (2-1); Joe Canning (0-5, 0-4 frees); R O'Meara (0-5, 0-2 frees); D Hayes (0-3); O Canning, A Smith (0-2); L Smith (0-1)		G Farragher (0-8, 0-3 frees); E Concannon (2-1); J Coyne (0-5, 0-2 frees); T Mannion, D Higgins (0-2); M Fahy (0-1)	Kenny Park, Athenry; Referee: Liam Gordon

15 October 2017; 13:00; Preliminary Quarter-final	Clarinbridge	2-14 - 1-13	Tommy Larkin's	Kenny Park, Athenry; Referee: Eoin Shaughnessy
15 October 2017; 13:00; Preliminary Quarter-final	E Niland (0-9, 0-8 frees); S Forde (1-1); N Armstrong (1-0); A Armstrong (0-2); B Morgan, M Daly (0-1)		J Flynn (0-5, 0-1 free, 0-1 sideline); C O'Byrne (1-0); R Murphy (0-3, 0-2 frees); K McHugo (0-2); C Flynn, C Gardiner, C Kelly (0-1)	Kenny Park, Athenry; Referee: Eoin Shaughnessy

15 October 2017; 14:30; Preliminary Quarter-final	Cappataggle	3-17 - 0-10	Kilnadeema-Leitrim	Kenny Park, Athenry; Referee: Alan Kelly
15 October 2017; 14:30; Preliminary Quarter-final	S Creaven (0-7); J Mannion (1-2); P Claffey (1-1); D Mannion (0-3); J Egan (0-2); D Nevin, R Garvey (0-1)		B Molloy (0-7, 0-6 frees, 0-1 '65); J Kenny, D Towolawi, M Lynch (0-1)	Kenny Park, Athenry; Referee: Alan Kelly

=== Quarter-finals ===
22 October 2017; 14:00; Quarter-final	Cappataggle	0-19 - 0-14	Sarsfields	Duggan Park, Ballinasloe; Referee: Leonard Fay
22 October 2017; 14:00; Quarter-final	S Creaven (0-8 frees); D Nevin (0-3, 0-1 sideline); J Egan, D Joyce, R Garvey (0-2); D Dolan, J Mannion (0-1)		N Morrissey (0-10, 0-7 frees); J Cooney (0-2); A Ward, J Lawless (0-1)	Duggan Park, Ballinasloe; Referee: Leonard Fay

22 October 2017; 15:30; Quarter-final	Gort	1-25 - 2-16	Killimordaly	Duggan Park, Ballinasloe; Referee: Sean Moran
22 October 2017; 15:30; Quarter-final	A Helebert (0-10, 0-5 frees, 0-1 '65); A Harte (1-4); Greg Lally (0-5, 0-3 frees, 0-1 '65); Jason Grealish (0-2); S Óg Linnane, A Mullins, R Cummins, J Commins (0-1)		B Burke (0-13, 0-10 frees, 0-2 '65s); T Madden (1-2); E Ryan (1-0); D Cooney (0-1)	Duggan Park, Ballinasloe; Referee: Sean Moran

22 October 2017; 13:00; Quarter-final	Craughwell	0-15 - 0-12	Portumna	Kenny Park, Athenry; Referee: Shane Hynes
22 October 2017; 13:00; Quarter-final	Niall Healy (0-7, 0-6 frees); F Healy (0-3); S Dolan (0-2); A Greaney, T Monaghan, A Callanan (0-1)		Joe Canning (0-12, 0-10 frees)	Kenny Park, Athenry; Referee: Shane Hynes

22 October 2017; 14:30; Quarter-final	Liam Mellows	0-18 - 1-15	Clarinbridge	Kenny Park, Athenry; Referee: Liam Gordon
22 October 2017; 14:30; Quarter-final	A Morrissey (0-11, 0-7 frees); T Haran, C Kavanagh, J Forde (0-2); R Elwood (0-1)		S Forde (1-4); E Niland (0-4, 0-3 frees); M Daly (0-3); B Daly, B Moran, C Salmon, E Forde (0-1)	Kenny Park, Athenry; Referee: Liam Gordon

29 October 2017; 14:00; Quarter-final Replay	Liam Mellows	1-11 - 0-12	Clarinbridge	Kenny Park, Athenry; Referee: Christy Browne
29 October 2017; 14:00; Quarter-final Replay	A Morrissey (0-8 frees); R Elwood (1-0); T Haran (0-2); J Forde (0-1)		E Niland (0-6, 0-3 frees, 0-1 '56); M Daly (0-3, 0-1 free); N Armstrong, S Forde, E Forde (0-1)	Kenny Park, Athenry; Referee: Christy Browne

=== Semi-finals ===
12 November 2017; 12:45; Semi-final	Liam Mellows	0-13 - 1-9	Cappataggle	Kenny Park, Athenry; Referee: Eoin Shaughnessy
12 November 2017; 12:45; Semi-final	Tadhg Haran 0-5 (4f), Mark Hughes (1f), Ronan Elwood 0-2 each, Conor Hynes, Aonghus Callanan, Adrian Morrissey (1f), Kevin Lee 0-1 each	Report	Jarlaith Mannion 1-2, Donal Mannion 0-2 (2f), Stephen Creaven (1f), James Egan, Alan Dolan, Damien Joyce, Darragh Dolan 0-1 each	Kenny Park, Athenry; Referee: Eoin Shaughnessy

12 November 2017; 14:30; Semi-final	Craughwell	0-13 - 1-10	Gort	Kenny Park, Athenry; Referee: John Keane
12 November 2017; 14:30; Semi-final	Niall Healy 0-9 (7f), Thomas Monaghan, Niall Callanan, Alan Callanan, James Greaney 0-1 each		Aiden Helebert 1-4 (2f), Jason Grealish 0-4, Greg Lally 0-2 (2f)	Kenny Park, Athenry; Referee: John Keane

19 November 2017; 12:30; Semi-final Replay	Craughwell	1-15 - 1-17	Gort	Kenny Park, Athenry
19 November 2017; 12:30; Semi-final Replay	Niall Healy 0-10 (7f), Shane Dolan 1-1, Thomas Monaghan 0-2, Alan Callanan, Stephen Hynes 0-1 each	Report	Aidan Harte 1-4, Aiden Helebert 0-6 (5f), Greg Lally (2f), Jason Grealish 0-2 each, Kaelen Higgins, Albert Mullins, Richie Cummins 0-1 each	Kenny Park, Athenry

=== Final ===
3 December 2017; 2:00 pm Final	Liam Mellows	3-12 - 1-15	Gort	Pearse Stadium; Referee: Christy Browne
3 December 2017; 2:00 pm Final	Adrian Morrissey 0-8 (0-7f), Aonghus Callanan 1-1, Tadhg Haran 1-2 (2 sl), Conor Kavanagh 1-0, Ronan Elwood 0-1	Report	Aidan Helebert 0-10 (0-7f), Richie Cummins 1-0, Greg Lally 0-2f, Albert Mullins 0-1, Jason Grealish 0-1, Kealen Higgins 0-1	Pearse Stadium; Referee: Christy Browne

Liam Mellows:
1	Kenneth Walsh
2	Mark Hughes
3	Sean Morrissey
4	Cathal Reilly
5	David Collins
6	Michael Conneely
7	Jack Hastings
8	Kevin Lee
9	Stephen Barrett
10	Conor Kavanagh
11	Ronan Elwood
12	Aonghus Callanan
13	Tadhg Haran
14	Adrian Morrissey
15	Conor Hynes
Substitutes Used:
17	Jack Forde for Conor Hynes (57 mins)
19	David Fahy for Aonghus Callanan (60 mins)
21	Conor Elwood for Conor Kavanagh (62 mins)
Manager:
Louis Mulqueen

Gort:
1	Gavin Lally
2	Mark Mcmahon
3	Andy Coen
4	Michael Cummins
5	Pakie Lally
6	Greg Lally
7	Jack Grealish
8	Sylvie Óg Linnane
9	Kaelen Higgins
10	Michael Mullins
11	Aidan Harte
12	Albert Mullins
13	Aiden Helebert
14	Richie Cummins
15	Jason Grealish
Substitutes Used:
19	Jack Commins for Albert Mullins (49 mins)
18	Niall Forde for Michael Cummins (53 mins)
17	Paul Killilea for Jason Grealish (55 mins)
20	Wayne Walsh for Aiden Helebert (60 mins)
Manager:
Michael Browne
