= 2015 Galway Senior Hurling Championship =

Annual hurling competition season

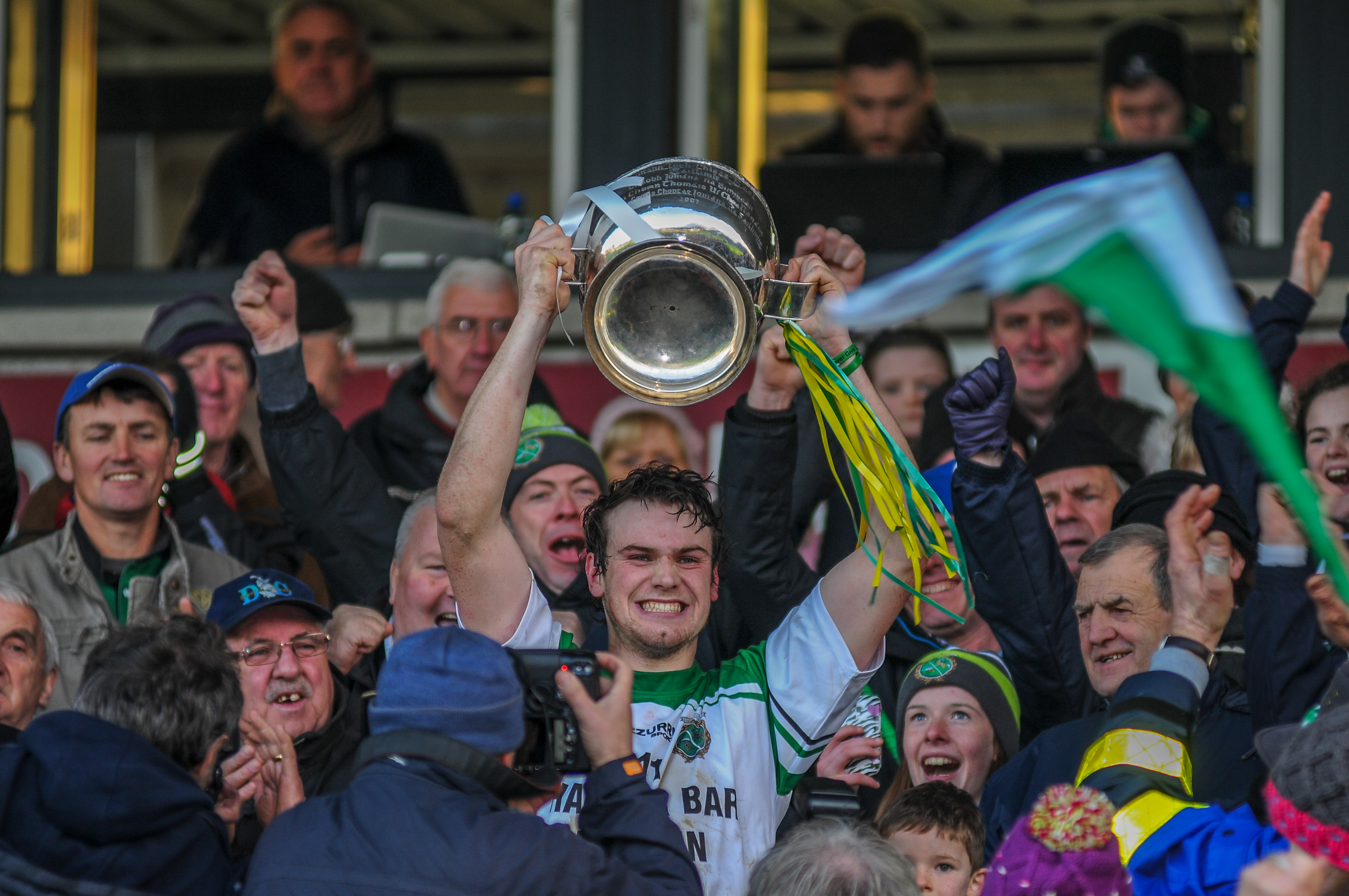

Tournament details
- County: Galway
- Year: 2015

Winners
- Champions: Sarsfields
- Manager: Cathal Murray
- Captain: Joseph Cooney

Promotion/Relegation
- Promoted team(s): N/A
- Relegated team(s): N/A

The 2015 Galway Senior Hurling Championship was the 118th staging of the Galway Senior Hurling Championship since its establishment in 1887. Gort were the reigning champions. Cappataggle participated in the senior championship having won the intermediate competition in 2014.

== Fixtures and results ==
=== Group stage ===
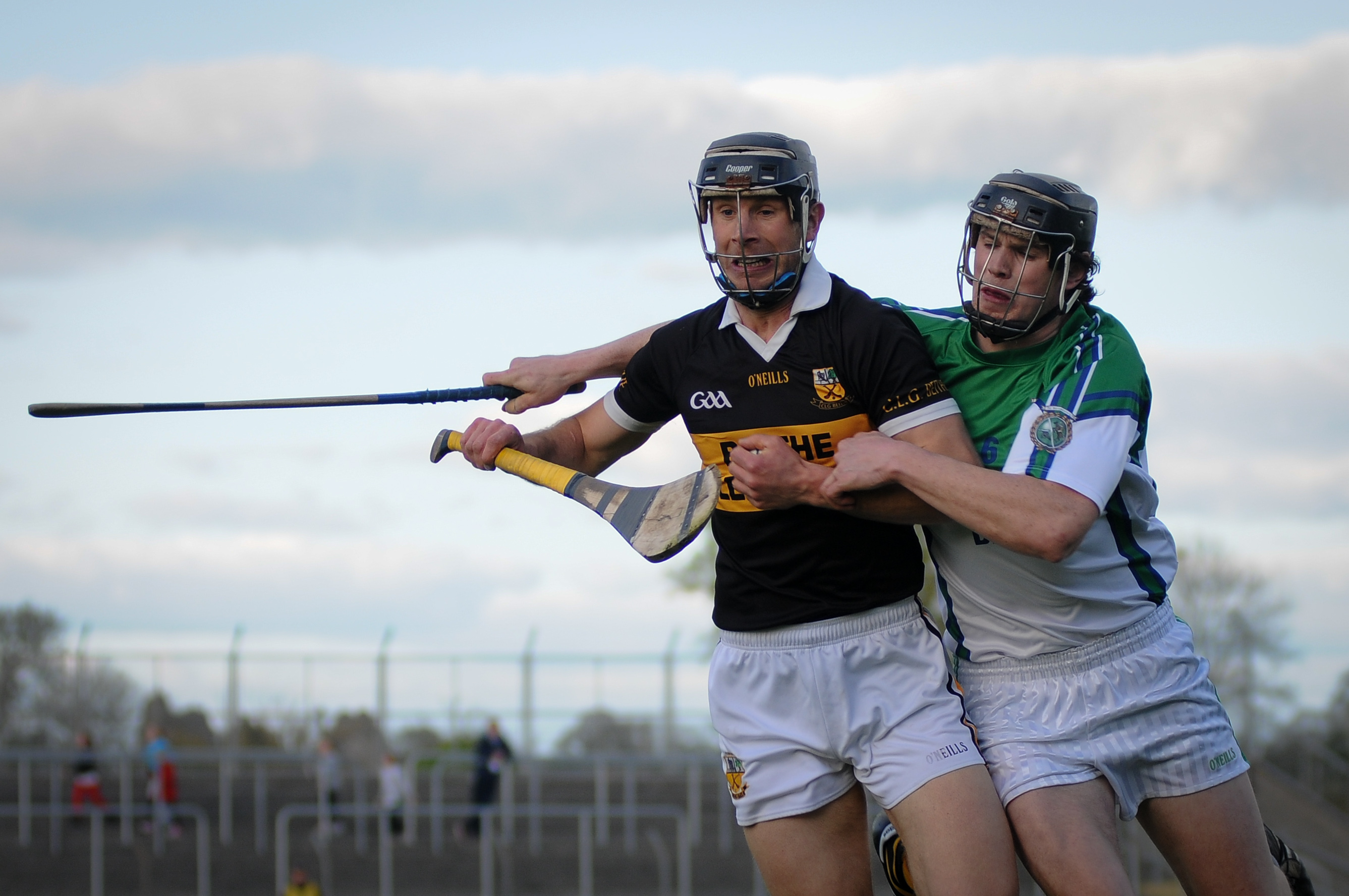
Joe Gantley of Beagh and Joseph Cooney of Sarsfields in action in the 2015 Galway Senior Hurling Championship at Kenny Park, Athenry

The Group stage draw was made on 23 February 2015 in the Salthill Hotel and broadcast live on Galway Bay FM. The first round of games took place on the weekend of 25 April 2015.

==== Group A ====
Pos	Team	Pld	W	D	L	SF	SA	Diff	Pts
1	Craughwell	5	4	0	1	9-90	6-63	36	8
2	Liam Mellows	5	3	1	1	14-80	5-70	37	7
3	Castlegar	5	3	0	2	11-71	7-71	12	6
4	Tommy Larkin's	5	3	0	2	8-81	9-58	20	6
5	Kilnadeema-Leitrim	5	1	1	3	4-69	9-79	-25	3
6	Carnmore	5	0	0	5	3-65	13-115	-80	0

25 April 2015; 17:00; Round 1	Tommy Larkin's	1-14 - 1-9	Craughwell	Kenny Park, Athenry; Referee: Liam Gordon
25 April 2015; 17:00; Round 1	Jason Flynn (0-9); Gerard Kelly (1-2); Conor Gardiner (0-2); Stephen Page (0-1)		Niall Healy (1-4); Fergal Healy (0-2); Mark Horan, Keelan Cullinane, Brian Callinan (0-1)	Kenny Park, Athenry; Referee: Liam Gordon

26 April 2015; 15:30; Round 1	Kilnadeema-Leitrim	1-16 - 2-13	Liam Mellows	Duggan Park, Ballinasloe; Referee: Eoin Shaughnessy
26 April 2015; 15:30; Round 1	Brain Molloy (0-9); Jack Kenny (1-0); Dara Herlihy (0-2); Gary Winters, Tom Tierney, Liam Geraghty, Tony Molloy, Shane Lawless (0-1)		Tadhg Haran (0-10); Aonghus Callanan (2-0); Jack Hastings (0-2); Conor Hynes (0-1)	Duggan Park, Ballinasloe; Referee: Eoin Shaughnessy

26 April 2015; 18:30; Round 1	Castlegar	1-18 - 0-13	Carnmore	Kenny Park, Athenry; Referee: Michael Haverty
26 April 2015; 18:30; Round 1	Ger Farragher (0-8); Enda Concanon (1-1); Dean Higgins, Kevin Brady (0-3); Jason O'Gorman, David O'Gorman, Michael Fahy (0-1)		Kevin Killilea (0-9); George Hanley (0-2); Barry Hanley, Aaron Fox (0-1)	Kenny Park, Athenry; Referee: Michael Haverty

9 May 2015; 17:00; Round 2	Tommy Larkin's	2-22 - 1-12	Carnmore	Kenny Park, Athenry; Referee: John McDonagh
9 May 2015; 17:00; Round 2	Jason Flynn (0-11); Niall Kelly (1-3); Stephen Keon (1-2); Conor Gardiner, Kevin McHugo (0-2); Cathal O'Byrne, Colm Flynn (0-1)		Kevin Killilea (1-7); Barry Hanley (0-3); Aaron Fox, Ciaran Murray (0-1)	Kenny Park, Athenry; Referee: John McDonagh

10 May 2015; 13:30; Round 2	Castlegar	1-12 - 1-11	Kilnadeema-Leitrim	St. Brendan's Park, Loughrea; Referee: John Keane
10 May 2015; 13:30; Round 2	Ger Farragher (0-9); Enda Concanon (1-1); Dean Higgins, Donal McGreal (0-1)		Brain Molloy (0-9); Sean Burke (1-0); Jack Kenny, Shane Lawless (0-1)	St. Brendan's Park, Loughrea; Referee: John Keane

10 May 2015; 17:30; Round 2	Craughwell	2-17 - 2-10	Liam Mellows	Kenny Park, Athenry; Referee: Michael Haverty
10 May 2015; 17:30; Round 2	Niall Healy (2-9); Fergal Healy (0-3); Stephen Hynes (0-2); John Ryan, Niall Callanan, Thomas Monaghan (0-1)		Adrian Morrissey (1-4); Aonghus Callanan (1-1); Tadhg Haran (0-4); Ronan Elwood (0-1)	Kenny Park, Athenry; Referee: Michael Haverty

7 June 2015; 19:00; Round 3	Craughwell	2-26 - 1-15	Carnmore	Kenny Park, Athenry; Referee: Alan Kelly
7 June 2015; 19:00; Round 3	Niall Healy (1-11); Fergal Healy (0-6); Alan Callanan (1-1); Stephen Hynes, Thomas Monaghan (0-3); Keelan Cullinane (0-2)	Report	Kevin Killilea (0-10); Barry Hanley (0-5); George Hanley (1-0)	Kenny Park, Athenry; Referee: Alan Kelly

11 July 2015; 18:00; Round 3	Tommy Larkin's	3-17 - 1-08	Kilnadeema-Leitrim	Duggan Park, Ballinasloe; Referee: Leonard Fay
11 July 2015; 18:00; Round 3	Jason Flynn (1-10); Stephen Keon (1-1); Gerard Kelly (1-0); Conor Gardiner (0-2); Cathal Kelly, Kevin McHugo, Shane Kelly (0-1)		Brain Molloy (0-5); Cathal Nevin (1-0); Jack Kenny, Tom Tierney, Tony Molloy (0-1)	Duggan Park, Ballinasloe; Referee: Leonard Fay

11 July 2015; 19:30; Round 3	Liam Mellows	2-16 - 2-14	Castlegar	Pearse Stadium, Galway; Referee: P Sheehan
11 July 2015; 19:30; Round 3	Tadhg Haran (2-12); Jack Hastings (0-2); Aonghus Callanan, Ronan Elwood (0-1)		Ger Farragher (1-9); Kevin Brady (1-1); Michael Fahy (0-2); David O'Gorman, Enda Concanon (0-1)	Pearse Stadium, Galway; Referee: P Sheehan

19 September 2015; 17:30; Round 4	Kilnadeema-Leitrim	1-23 - 1-15	Carnmore	Kenny Park, Athenry; Referee: Seamus Moran
19 September 2015; 17:30; Round 4	Brain Molloy (0-14, 0-8 frees); Shane Lawless (1-2); David Tierney (0-3); Dara Herlihy (0-2); Damien Donoghue, Jack Kenny (0-1)		Kevin Killilea (0-7, 0-6 frees); Barry Hanley (0-5, 0-3 frees); George Hanley (1-2, 0-1 free); D Cummins (0-1)	Kenny Park, Athenry; Referee: Seamus Moran

20 September 2015; 16:00; Round 4	Liam Mellows	1-15 - 0-13	Tommy Larkin's	Kenny Park, Athenry; Referee: Liam Gordon
20 September 2015; 16:00; Round 4	Tadhg Haran (1-5, 0-3 frees); Adrian Morrissey (0-6, 0-5 frees); Aonghus Callanan (0-2); Conor Hynes, Enda Fallon (0-1)		Jason Flynn (0-7, 0-6 frees); Colm Flynn (0-3); Kevin Huban (0-2); Conor Gardiner (0-1)	Kenny Park, Athenry; Referee: Liam Gordon

20 September 2015; 17:30; Round 4	Craughwell	2-16 - 2-13	Castlegar	Kenny Park, Athenry; Referee: Michael Haverty
20 September 2015; 17:30; Round 4	Niall Healy (1-8, 0-5 frees); Jamie Ryan (1-1); Alan Callanan (0-3); Niall Callinan, Stephen Hynes, Thomas Monaghan, Brian Callanan (0-1)		Ger Farragher (1-6 frees); Enda Concannon (0-4); Dean Higgins (1-1); Kevin Brady, Jack Coyne (0-1)	Kenny Park, Athenry; Referee: Michael Haverty

26 September 2015; 15:30; Round 5	Craughwell	2-22 - 0-11	Kilnadeema-Leitrim	Duggan Park, Ballinasloe; Referee: John Keane
26 September 2015; 15:30; Round 5	Niall Healy (2-5); Fergal Healy (0-7); Jamie Ryan, Brian Callinan, Brian Dolan (0-2); Andrew Greaney, John Ryan, Stephen Hynes, Thomas Monaghan (0-1)		Liam Kelly (0-5); Brain Molloy (0-4); Tom Tierney, David Tierney (0-1)	Duggan Park, Ballinasloe; Referee: John Keane

26 September 2015; 15:30; Round 5	Castlegar	5-14 - 2-15	Tommy Larkin's	St. Brendan's Park, Loughrea; Referee: Alan Kelly
26 September 2015; 15:30; Round 5	Ger Farragher (2-5); Enda Concanon (2-3); Kevin Keane (1-1); Dean Higgins, Martin Cullinane (0-2); John Connor (0-1)		Jason Flynn (0-8); Kevin McHugo (1-4); Cathal O'Byrne (1-0); Conor Gardiner (0-2); Colm Flynn (0-1)	St. Brendan's Park, Loughrea; Referee: Alan Kelly

26 September 2015; 15:30; Round 5	Liam Mellows	7-26 - 0-10	Carnmore	Kenny Park, Athenry; Referee: John McDonagh
26 September 2015; 15:30; Round 5	Tadhg Haran (2-10); Aonghus Callanan (2-4); Conor Hynes (1-3); Enda Fallon (1-1); Jack Hastings (1-0); Stephen Barrett (0-3); Sean Morrissey, Adrian Morrissey (0-2); Kevin Lee, Ronan Elwood (0-1)		Kevin Killilea (0-8); Gary Grealish, Ciaran Fahy (0-1)	Kenny Park, Athenry; Referee: John McDonagh

==== Group B ====
Pos	Team	Pld	W	D	L	SF	SA	Diff	Pts
1	Gort	5	4	1	0	9-88	3-62	44	9
2	Pádraig Pearse's	5	4	0	1	4-86	6-66	14	8
3	Clarinbridge	5	3	0	2	5-78	3-61	23	6
4	Athenry	5	2	0	3	1-68	4-79	-20	4
5	Ardrahan	5	1	1	3	4-74	8-78	-16	3
6	Kiltormer	5	0	0	5	7-39	6-87	-45	0

25 April 2015; 16:30; Round 1	Pádraig Pearse's	1-13 - 0-12	Clarinbridge	Duggan Park, Ballinasloe; Referee: Michael Dolan
25 April 2015; 16:30; Round 1	Ronan Bellew (0-9); Cyril Donnellan (0-3); Tomas Flannery (1-0); Emmet Ward (0-1)		Evan Niland (0-11); Sean Kilduf (0-1)	Duggan Park, Ballinasloe; Referee: Michael Dolan

26 April 2015; 12:00; Round 1	Athenry	0-14 - 1-4	Kiltormer	St. Brendan's Park, Loughrea; Referee: John McDonagh
26 April 2015; 12:00; Round 1	Cathal Keane (0-6); Mark Hannon (0-4); James Divally, David Donoghue (0-2)		David Hayes (1-0); Emmett Goode, Conor Ryan, Derek Dervan, Sean Claffey (0-1)	St. Brendan's Park, Loughrea; Referee: John McDonagh

26 April 2015; 17:00; Round 1	Gort	0-16 - 1-13	Ardrahan	Kenny Park, Athenry; Referee: John Keane
26 April 2015; 17:00; Round 1	Gerard Quinn (0-4); Richie Cummins (0-3); Wayne Walsh, Aidan Helebert (0-2); Aidan Harte, Greg Lally, Albert Mullins, Micheal Mullins, Keith Killlea (0-1)		Cormac Diviney (1-2); Jonathan Glynn, Maurice Callanan (0-4); Ger Hennelly (0-2); David Kennedy (0-1)	Kenny Park, Athenry; Referee: John Keane

9 May 2015; 18:30; Round 2	Pádraig Pearse's	2-20 - 1-17	Ardrahan	Kenny Park, Athenry; Referee: Leonard Fay
9 May 2015; 18:30; Round 2	Ronan Bellew (0-7); Tomas Flannery (1-2); Emmet Ward (0-4); Gareth Lally (1-1); Colm Raftery (0-3); Jimmy Gelston (0-2); Aidan Kilkenny (0-1)		Iarla Tannian (0-6); Cormac Diviney (1-1); Maurice Callanan (0-4); Jonathan Glynn (0-2); David Kennedy, Ger Hennelly, Joe O'Leary, Jason Kennedy (0-1)	Kenny Park, Athenry; Referee: Leonard Fay

10 May 2015; 12:00; Round 2	Gort	2-11 - 1-10	Kiltormer	St. Brendan's Park, Loughrea; Referee: Alan Kelly
10 May 2015; 12:00; Round 2	Gerard Quinn (2-5); Wayne Walsh (0-3); Aidan Harte (0-2); Niall Forde (0-1)		David Hayes (1-8); Sean Frehill, Michael Dolan (0-1)	St. Brendan's Park, Loughrea; Referee: Alan Kelly

10 May 2015; 19:00; Round 2	Clarinbridge	0-17 - 0-10	Athenry	Kenny Park, Athenry; Referee: Michael Conway
10 May 2015; 19:00; Round 2	Evan Niland (0-11), Christopher Bannon, Barry Keane, Billy Lane, Paul Coen, David Donoghue, David Forde (0-1)		Cathal Keane (0-6), Cian Burke, Conor Burke, James Divally, Paddy Hannon (0-1)	Kenny Park, Athenry; Referee: Michael Conway

12 July 2015; 12:00; Round 3	Gort	4-19 - 0-12	Pádraig Pearse's	St. Brendan's Park, Loughrea; Referee: Michael Dolan
12 July 2015; 12:00; Round 3	Aidan Helebert (0-7); Richie Cummins (2-1); Jason Grealish (1-3); Gerard Quinn (0-5); Micheal Mullins (1-1); Aidan Harte, Niall Forde (0-1)		Ronan Bellew (0-11); Damian Wynne (0-1)	St. Brendan's Park, Loughrea; Referee: Michael Dolan

12 July 2015; 18:00; Round 3	Clarinbridge	2-21 - 1-10	Kiltormer	Kenny Park, Athenry; Referee: Gerry Donoghue
12 July 2015; 18:00; Round 3	Evan Niland (0-10); Barry Keane (1-2); Barry Daly (0-3); Sean Kilduf, Alan Armstrong, Ciaran Morrissey, Niall Armstrong, Eanna Murphy, Eoin Forde, Shane Burke (0-1)		Conor Ryan (0-10); Patrick Cormican (1-0)	Kenny Park, Athenry; Referee: Gerry Donoghue

19 September 2015; 17:30; Round 3	Athenry	1-16 - 0-12	Ardrahan	St. Brendan's Park, Loughrea; Referee: John Keane
19 September 2015; 17:30; Round 3	Cathal Keane (0-9, 0-8 frees); Conor Caulfield (1-0); David Donoghue (0-2); Conor Burke, Paddy Hannon, Jack Carr, Tom Flynn, Ronan Hardiman (0-1)		Jason Kennedy (0-9 frees); Ger Hennelly (0-2); Cormac Diviney (0-1)	St. Brendan's Park, Loughrea; Referee: John Keane

20 September 2015; 12:00; Round 4	Gort	1-15 - 1-12	Clarinbridge	St. Brendan's Park, Loughrea; Referee: Alan Kelly
20 September 2015; 12:00; Round 4	Aidan Helebert (0-7, 0-6 frees); Jason Grealish (1-2); Aidan Harte (0-3); Gerard Quinn (0-2); Wayne Walsh (0-1)		Evan Niland (0-7, 0-6 frees); Shane Burke (1-0); Paul Coen, Alan Armstrong (0-2); Eanna Murphy (0-1)	St. Brendan's Park, Loughrea; Referee: Alan Kelly

26 September 2015; 17:00; Round 4	Ardrahan	2-19 - 3-10	Kiltormer	St. Brendan's Park, Loughrea; Referee: Derek Kelly
26 September 2015; 17:00; Round 4	Cian Walsh (0-7); Cormac Diviney (0-6); Pierce McCrann, Ger Hennelly (1-0); Stephen Whelan (0-3); Joe O'Leary (0-2)		Keith Kilkenny (1-5); Killian Campbell (2-0); Michael Dolan (0-3); Derek Dervan (0-2)	St. Brendan's Park, Loughrea; Referee: Derek Kelly

26 September 2015; 17:00; Round 4	Pádraig Pearse's	1-19 - 0-13	Athenry	Duggan Park, Ballinasloe; Referee: Christopher Browne
26 September 2015; 17:00; Round 4	Tomas Flannery (1-8); Ronan Bellew (0-6); Jimmy Gelston (0-2); Kerrill Hardiman, Damian Wynne, Sean Hardiman (0-1)		Cathal Keane (0-7); David Donoghue (0-4); Mark Hannon, Cian Burke (0-1)	Duggan Park, Ballinasloe; Referee: Christopher Browne

3 October 2015; 15:00; Round 5	Gort	2-27 - 0-15	Athenry	Clarinbridge; Referee: Eoin Shaughnessy

3 October 2015; 15:00; Round 5	Clarinbridge	2-16 - 0-13	Ardrahan	Kenny Park, Athenry; Referee: Paul Fahy

3 October 2015; 15:00; Round 5	Pádraig Pearse's	0-22 - 1-5	Kiltormer	St. Brendan's Park, Loughrea; Referee: Michael Dolan

==== Group C ====
Pos	Team	Pld	W	D	L	SF	SA	Diff	Pts
1	Portumna	4	4	0	0	8-71	4-55	28	8
2	St. Thomas'	4	2	1	1	1-71	5-51	8	5
3	Turloughmore	4	2	0	2	4-60	3-68	-5	4
4	Killimordaly	4	0	2	2	4-47	4-59	-12	2
5	Mullagh	4	0	1	3	4-56	2-72	-19	1

25 April 2015; 18:30; Round 1	Portumna	2-18 - 0-6	Turloughmore	St. Brendan's Park, Loughrea; Referee: Alan Kelly
25 April 2015; 18:30; Round 1	Joe Canning (0-10); Andy Smith (1-2); Damien Hayes (1-1); Patrick Dolphin (0-2); Kevin Hayes, Owen Treacy, Niall Hayes (0-1)		Jamie Holland (0-2); Darren O'Shaughnessy, Ronan Badger, Conor Shaughnessy (0-1)	St. Brendan's Park, Loughrea; Referee: Alan Kelly

26 April 2015; 13:30; Round 1	Killimordaly	0-15 - 1-12	Mullagh	St. Brendan's Park, Loughrea; Referee: Gerry Donoghue
26 April 2015; 13:30; Round 1	Brian Burke (0-10); Darragh Cooney, David Concannon, Brian Concannon, Paul Madden, Eanna Ryan (0-1)		Cathal Dervan (0-7); Justin Gaynor (1-0); Davy Glennon (0-2); Finnian Coone, Craig Finnerty, Padraig Kennedy (0-1)	St. Brendan's Park, Loughrea; Referee: Gerry Donoghue

9 May 2015; 17:30; Round 2	St. Thomas'	0-19 - 0-17	Turloughmore	St. Brendan's Park, Loughrea; Referee: Eoin Shaughnessy
9 May 2015; 17:30; Round 2	Eanna Burke (0-9), Gerald Kelly (0-4), James Regan (0-3), Shane Cooney, David Burke, Bernard Burke (0-1)		Conor Shaughnessy (0-8), Jamie Holland (0-4), Cian Burke (0-2), Kevin Hussey, Darren O'Shaughnessy, Sean Linnane (0-1)	St. Brendan's Park, Loughrea; Referee: Eoin Shaughnessy

9 May 2015; 19:30; Round 2	Portumna	1-19 - 2-14	Killimordaly	Duggan Park, Ballinasloe; Referee: Sean Moran
9 May 2015; 19:30; Round 2	Joe Canning (0-15), Damien Hayes (1-1), Ronan O'Meara (0-2), Andy Smith (0-1)		Brian Burke (1-5), David Concannon, Eanna Ryan (0-3), Tomas Madden (1-0), Brian Concannon, Declan Connolly, Darragh Cooney (0-1)	Duggan Park, Ballinasloe; Referee: Sean Moran

10 July 2015; 19:30; Round 3	Portumna	2-19 - 2-12	Mullagh	Duggan Park, Ballinasloe; Referee: John Keane
10 July 2015; 19:30; Round 3	Joe Canning (1-9); Damien Hayes (0-6); Ronan O'Meara (1-1); Kevin Hayes (0-2); Andy Smith (0-1)		Cathal Dervan (2-8); Conor Dervan, Donal Reilly, Justin Gaynor, Sean Hardiman (0-1)	Duggan Park, Ballinasloe; Referee: John Keane

11 July 2015; 16:00; Round 3	Killimordaly	2-7 - 0-13	St. Thomas'	Kenny Park, Athenry; Referee: Liam Gordon
11 July 2015; 16:00; Round 3	Brian Burke (1-4); Conor Daly (1-1); Eanna Ryan (0-2)		Eanna Burke (0-8); James Regan (0-2); Anthony Kelly, Bernard Burke, David Sherry (0-1)	Kenny Park, Athenry; Referee: Liam Gordon

19 September 2015; 16:00; Round 4	St. Thomas'	1-16 - 0-12	Mullagh	St. Brendan's Park, Loughrea; Referee: Eoin Shaughnessy
19 September 2015; 16:00; Round 4	Eanna Burke (0-9, 0-2 frees); Gerald Kelly (1-0); Conor Cooney, James Regan (0-2); David Burke, Kenneth Burke, Anthony Kelly (0-1)		Stephen Cahalan (0-8, 0-7 frees); Padraig Kennedy, Sean Hardiman, Justin Gaynor, Davy Glennon (0-1)	St. Brendan's Park, Loughrea; Referee: Eoin Shaughnessy

19 September 2015; 16:00; Round 4	Turloughmore	2-15 - 0-11	Killimordaly	Kenny Park, Athenry; Referee: Shane Hynes
19 September 2015; 16:00; Round 4	Conor Shaughnessy (1-6, 0-5 frees); Jamie Holland (0-6, 0-3 frees); Shane Burke (1-0); Brian Murphy, Cian Burke, Darren O'Shaughnessy (0-1)		Brian Burke (0-8 frees); Eanna Ryan (0-3)	Kenny Park, Athenry; Referee: Shane Hynes

26 September 2015; 17:00; Round 5	Turloughmore	2-22 - 1-20	Mullagh	Gort
26 September 2015; 17:00; Round 5	Conor Shaughnessy (1-6); Shane Burke (1-0); Jamie Holland, Barry McDonagh, Sean Linnane (0-3); Sean Loftus, Cian Burke, Dathaí Burke (0-2); Darren O'Shaughnessy (0-1)		Davy Glennon (0-10); Finnian Coone (1-2); Justin Gaynor (0-4); Conor Hardiman (0-2); Sean Hardiman, Damien Monaghan (0-1)	Gort

27 September 2015; 12:00; Round 5	Portumna	3-15 - 0-23	St. Thomas'	Duggan Park, Ballinasloe; Referee: Peter Campbell
27 September 2015; 12:00; Round 5	Joe Canning (2-8); Ronan O'Meara (1-2); Ivan Canning (0-3); Ciaran Comeford, Kevin Hayes (0-1)		Conor Cooney (0-9); Richie Murray, Bernard Burke, James Regan, Brendan Farrell, Anthony Kelly, Kenneth Burke, Darragh Burke (0-2)	Duggan Park, Ballinasloe; Referee: Peter Campbell

==== Group D ====
Pos	Team	Pld	W	D	L	SF	SA	Diff	Pts
1	Loughrea	4	3	1	0	5-62	1-57	20	7
2	Sarsfields	4	3	0	1	7-55	5-56	5	6
3	Beagh	4	1	1	2	1-50	4-55	-14	3
4	Tynagh-Abbey/Duniry	4	1	1	2	4-51	6-57	-2	3
5	Cappataggle	4	0	1	3	2-57	2-66	-9	1

25 April 2015; 15:00; Round 1	Tynagh-Abbey/Duniry	0-14 - 1-11	Loughrea	Duggan Park, Ballinasloe; Referee: Kevin Egan
25 April 2015; 15:00; Round 1	Shane Moloney (0-9); Colm Larkin (0-2); Paul Killeen, Kevin Maloney, Micheál Dervan (0-1)		Paul Hoban (0-1); Neil Keary (0-3); Emmet Mahony, Johnny Coen, Jamie Ryan (0-2); Sean Sweeney, Joe Mooney (0-1)	Duggan Park, Ballinasloe; Referee: Kevin Egan

25 April 2015; 18:30; Round 1	Sarsfields	3-11 - 0-7	Beagh	Kenny Park, Athenry; Referee: Peter Murphy
25 April 2015; 18:30; Round 1	Alan Ward (2-7); Kerill Wade (0-3); Noel Kelly (1-0); Niall Morrissey (0-1)		Rory Gantley (0-4); Kevin Keehan (0-2); Adrian Tuohy (0-1)	Kenny Park, Athenry; Referee: Peter Murphy

9 May 2015; 18:00; Round 2	Sarsfields	0-16 - 0-11	Cappataggle	Duggan Park, Ballinasloe; Referee: Liam Gordon
9 May 2015; 18:00; Round 2	Alan Ward (0-6), Niall Quinn (0-3), Joseph Cooney, Kerill Wade (0-2), Kevin Hynes, Niall Morrissey, Noel Kelly (0-1)		Daniel Nevin (0-9), Éanna Garvey, Emmet Malone (0-1)	Duggan Park, Ballinasloe; Referee: Liam Gordon

9 May 2015; 19:00; Round 2	Beagh	1-16 - 0-17	Tynagh-Abbey/Duniry	St. Brendan's Park, Loughrea; Referee: Michael Dolan
9 May 2015; 19:00; Round 2	Rory Gantley (0-9), Padraic Landers (1-2), Adrian Tuohy (0-2), Tommy McKeown, Kevin Keehan, Joe Gantley (0-1)		Shane Moloney (0-13), Colm Larkin, Gary McHugo, Padraig Breheny, Johnny Conroy (0-1)	St. Brendan's Park, Loughrea; Referee: Michael Dolan

11 July 2015; 14:30; Round 3	Loughrea	1-10 - 0-10	Beagh	Kenny Park, Athenry; Referee: Alan Kelly
11 July 2015; 14:30; Round 3	Johnny Maher (0-5); Emmet Mahony (1-1); Jamie Ryan (0-2); Enda Keary, Johnny Coen (0-1)		John Moylan (0-3); Adrian Tuohy (0-2); Padraic Landers, Jamie Diviney, Joe Gantley, Rory Gantley (0-1)	Kenny Park, Athenry; Referee: Alan Kelly

11 July 2015; 16:30; Round 3	Tynagh-Abbey/Duniry	1-14 - 0-16	Cappataggle	Duggan Park, Ballinasloe; Referee: Eoin Shaughnessy
11 July 2015; 16:30; Round 3	Shane Moloney (0-7); Paul Gordan (1-0); Colm Larkin (0-2); Gary McHugo, Gerard Burke, Micheál Dervan, Padraig Breheny (0-1)		Daniel Nevin (0-10); Jarlath Mannion (0-2); Damien Joyce, Darragh Dolan, Éanna Garvey, James Garvey (0-1)	Duggan Park, Ballinasloe; Referee: Eoin Shaughnessy

19 September 2015; 16:30; Round 4	Sarsfields	4-14 - 3-16	Tynagh-Abbey/Duniry	Duggan Park, Ballinasloe; Referee: Sean Moran
19 September 2015; 16:30; Round 4	Niall Morrissey (1-4 frees); Joseph Cooney (1-3); Noel Kelly, Ian Fox (1-0); Kerill Wade, Alan Ward (0-2, 0-1 free); Niall Quinn, Kevin Hynes, Sean Kelly (0-1)		Shane Moloney (1-6, 1-5 frees); Micheál Dervan (1-4); Paul Gordan (1-1); Paul Killeen (0-2); Colm Larkin, Padraig Breheny, Gary McHugo (0-1)	Duggan Park, Ballinasloe; Referee: Sean Moran

19 September 2015; 18:00; Round 4	Loughrea	1-19 - 2-13	Cappataggle	Duggan Park, Ballinasloe; Referee: Michael Dolan
19 September 2015; 18:00; Round 4	Neil Keary (0-4, 0-2 frees); Jamie Ryan (1-1); Gearoid Loughnane (0-4 frees); Joe Mooney (0-3); Johnny Maher (0-3 frees); Paul Hoban, Johnny Coen (0-1 free); Sean Sweeney, Emmet Mahony (0-1)		Daniel Nevin (0-9 frees); Damien Joyce (1-1); James Garvey (1-0); Alan Loughnane (0-2); Jarlath Mannion (0-1)	Duggan Park, Ballinasloe; Referee: Michael Dolan

26 September 2015; 17:00; Round 5	Loughrea	2-22 - 0-14	Sarsfields	Killimor
26 September 2015; 17:00; Round 5	Neil Keary (0-13); Jamie Ryan (1-2); Johnny Coen (1-1); Gearoid Loughnane (0-3); Sean Sweeney (0-2); Joe Mooney (0-1)		Alan Ward (0-7); Niall Morrissey, Kevin Hynes (0-2); Thomas Spellman, Niall Quinn, Noel Kelly (0-1)	Killimor

27 September 2015; 13:30; Round 5	Cappataggle	0-17 - 0-17	Beagh	St. Brendan's Park, Loughrea; Referee: Shane Hynes
27 September 2015; 13:30; Round 5	Daniel Nevin (0-9); Damien Joyce, Jarlath Mannion (0-2); James Skehill, Alan Loughnane, Éanna Garvey, Emmet Malone (0-1)		Rory Gantley (0-7); Joe Gantley (0-3); Tommy McKeown, Kevin Keehan (0-2); Adrian Tuohy, PJ McAllen, Kevin O'Grady (0-1)	St. Brendan's Park, Loughrea; Referee: Shane Hynes

=== Knockout stages ===
Quarter-finals
11 October - Kenny Park
Sarsfields	2-14
Padraig Pearse's	0-12
11 October - Kenny Park
Gort	1-19
Portumna	0-19
10/18 October - Kenny Park
St. Thomas'	0-21; 3-15
Loughrea	2-15; 0-12
10 October - Kenny Park
Craughwell	0-21
Liam Mellows	2-14

Semi-finals
25 October - Kenny Park
Sarsfields	0-21
Gort	0-17
25 October - Kenny Park
St. Thomas'	0-22
Craughwell	1-20

Final
8 November - Kenny Park; 22 November - Pearse Stadium
Sarsfields	0-12; 2-10
Craughwell	0-12; 0-14

==== Quarter-finals ====
The top two teams from each group will contest the quarter-finals. All of the quarter-finalists will take part in the Senior A competition in 2016.

10 October 2015; 15:00; Quarter-final	Craughwell	0-21 - 2-14	Liam Mellows	Kenny Park, Athenry; Referee: Christopher Browne
10 October 2015; 15:00; Quarter-final	Niall Healy (0-12); Jamie Ryan (0-3); Stephen Hynes (0-2); Andrew Greaney, Niall Callanan, Thomas Monaghan, Brian Callinan (0-1)		Tadhg Haran (0-11); Stephen Barrett (2-0); David Collins, Jack Hastings, Dean Fahy (0-1)	Kenny Park, Athenry; Referee: Christopher Browne

10 October 2015; 16:30; Quarter-final	St. Thomas'	0-21 - 2-15	Loughrea	Kenny Park, Athenry; Referee: Ger O'Connor
10 October 2015; 16:30; Quarter-final	Conor Cooney (0-7); Eanna Burke (0-5); David Burke, Richie Murray (0-3); Bernard Burke (0-2); Darragh Burke (0-1)		Neil Keary (0-9); Kenneth Colleran (2-1); Joe Mooney, Emmet Mahony (0-2); Jamie Ryan (0-1)	Kenny Park, Athenry; Referee: Ger O'Connor

18 October 2015; 15:30; Quarter-final Replay	St. Thomas'	3-15 - 0-12	Loughrea	Kenny Park, Athenry; Referee: Alan Kelly
18 October 2015; 15:30; Quarter-final Replay	Conor Cooney (0-6); Richie Murray (2-0); David Burke, Bernard Burke (0-3); Brendan Farrell (1-0); Eanna Burke (0-2); Kenneth Burke (0-1)		Neil Keary (0-4); Gearoid Loughnane (0-3); Sean Sweeney (0-2); Paul Hoban, Connor Jennings, Emmet Mahony (0-1)	Kenny Park, Athenry; Referee: Alan Kelly

11 October 2015; 12:00; Quarter-final	Gort	1-19 - 0-19	Portumna	Kenny Park, Athenry; Referee: John Keane
11 October 2015; 12:00; Quarter-final	Aidan Helebert (0-9); Jason Grealish (0-5); Gerard Quinn (1-0); Greg Lally (0-2); Sylvie Óg Linnane, Richie Cummins, Micheal Mullins (0-1)		Joe Canning (0-13); Kevin Hayes, Ronan O'Meara (0-2); Andy Smith, Ivan Canning (0-1)	Kenny Park, Athenry; Referee: John Keane

11 October 2015; 13:30; Quarter-final	Sarsfields	2-14 - 0-12	Padraig Pearse's	Kenny Park, Athenry; Referee: Eoin Shaughnessy
11 October 2015; 13:30; Quarter-final	Alan Ward (1-6); Ian Fox (1-1); Noel Kelly, Niall Morrissey (0-4); Kerill Wade (0-2)	Report	Tomas Flannery (0-6); Cyril Donnelan (0-2); Colm Raftery, Jimmy Gelston, Ronan Bellew, Ronan O'Neill (0-1)	Kenny Park, Athenry; Referee: Eoin Shaughnessy

==== Semi-finals ====
25 October 2015; 13:30; Semi-final	Craughwell	1-20 - 0-22	St. Thomas'	Kenny Park, Athenry; Referee: Christopher Browne
25 October 2015; 13:30; Semi-final	Niall Healy (1-11); Fergal Healy (0-3); Jamie Ryan (0-2); Thomas Monaghan, Adrian Cullinane, Alan Callanan, Keelan Cullinane (0-1)	Report	Conor Cooney (0-10); Bernard Burke (0-3); Darragh Burke (0-2); Richie Murray, Eanna Burke (0-2); David Burke, Kenneth Burke, Anthony Kelly (0-1)	Kenny Park, Athenry; Referee: Christopher Browne

25 October 2015; 15:00; Semi-final	Sarsfields	0-21 - 0-17	Gort	Kenny Park, Athenry; Referee: Alan Kelly
25 October 2015; 15:00; Semi-final	Niall Morrissey (0-12); Noel Kelly (0-3); Ian Skehill, Alan Ward (0-2); Cathal Murray, Joseph Cooney (0-1)	Report	Aidan Helebert (0-12); Aidan Harte, Brian Regan, Jason Grealish, Jack Grealish, Richie Cummins (0-1)	Kenny Park, Athenry; Referee: Alan Kelly

==== Final ====
8 November 2015; 14:30; Final Drawn Game	Sarsfields	0-12 - 0-12	Craughwell	Kenny Park, Athenry; Attendance: 8,000; Referee: John Keane
8 November 2015; 14:30; Final Drawn Game	Niall Morrissey (0-8); Alan Ward, Kerill Wade, Eamon Cleary, Joseph Cooney (0-1)	Report	Niall Healy (0-6); Alan Callanan (0-3); Ger O'Halloran (0-2); Thomas Monaghan (0-1)	Kenny Park, Athenry; Attendance: 8,000; Referee: John Keane

Sarsfields:
1	Ciaran Dolan
2	Cathal Murray
3	Darren Skehill
4	Diarmuid Murray
5	Niall Quinn
6	Ronan Quinn
7	Eamon Cleary
8	Kevin Hynes
9	Ian Fox
10	Niall Morrissey
11	Joseph Cooney (c)
12	Noel Kelly
13	Ian Skehill
14	Kerril Wade
15	Alan Ward
Substitutes Used:
22	Ivan Kenny for Ian Fox (56 mins)
31	Kevin Cooney for Kerril Wade (59 mins)
Manager:
Cathal Murray

Craughwell:
1	Aidan Ryan (c)
2	Shane Dolan
3	Ian Daniels
4	Mark Monaghan
5	Mark Horan
6	Adrian Cullinane
7	John Ryan
8	Niall Callanan
9	Ger O'Halloran
10	Stephen Hynes
11	Niall Healy
12	Jamie Ryan
13	Thomas Monaghan
14	Alan Callanan
15	Fergal Healy
Substitutes Used:
20	Keelan Cullinane for Stephen Hynes (48 mins)
Manager:
Stephen Glennon

==== Final replay ====
22 November; 13:45; Final replay	Sarsfields	2-10 - 0-14	Craughwell	Pearse Stadium; Referee: Shane Hynes
22 November; 13:45; Final replay	Niall Morrissey (0-6); Joseph Cooney, Noel Kelly (1-0); Sean Kelly (0-2); Kerril Wade, Kevin Cooney (0-1)	Report	Niall Healy (0-9); Jamie Ryan, Alan Callanan (0-2); Fergal Healy (0-1)	Pearse Stadium; Referee: Shane Hynes

Sarsfields:
1	Ciaran Dolan
2	Cathal Murray
3	Darren Skehill
4	Diarmuid Murray
5	Niall Quinn
6	Ronan Quinn
7	Eamon Cleary
8	Kevin Hynes
9	Ian Fox
10	Niall Morrissey
11	Joseph Cooney (c)
12	Noel Kelly
13	Ian Skehill
14	Kerril Wade
15	Alan Ward
Substitutes Used:
21	Kevin Cooney for Diarmuid Murray (20 mins)
22	Sean Kelly for Noel Kelly (35 mins)
31	Ivan Kenny for Alan Ward (57 mins)
Manager:
Cathal Murray

Craughwell:
1	Aidan Ryan (c)
2	Shane Dolan
3	Ian Daniels
4	Mark Monaghan
5	Mark Horan
6	Adrian Cullinane
7	John Ryan
8	Niall Callanan
9	Ger O'Halloran
10	Fergal Healy
11	Stephen Hynes
12	Jamie Ryan
13	Thomas Monaghan
14	Alan Callanan
15	Niall Healy
Substitutes Used:
17	Andrew Greaney for Ger O'Halloran (41 mins)
20	Keelan Cullinane for Stephen Hynes (53 mins)
Manager:
Stephen Glennon

=== Senior A 2016 Qualifiers ===
The 14 teams who have not qualified for the quarter-finals will be divided into 4 groups - two groups of four and two groups of three.

The 4 group winners will take part in the Senior A competition in 2016. The remaining 10 teams will join the Intermediate finalists in the Senior B competition in 2016.

==== Qualifier Group A ====
Pos	Team	Pld	W	D	L	SF	SA	Diff	Pts
1	Cappataggle	3	2	1	0	2-48	2-39	9	5
2	Beagh	3	2	0	1	2-46	2-46	0	4
3	Killimordaly	2	0	1	1	1-27	1-29	-2	1
4	Tommy Larkin's	2	0	0	2	1-29	1-36	-7	0

17 October 2015; 14:30; Qualifier Round 1	Beagh	0-16 - 0-15	Tommy Larkin's	St. Brendan's Park, Loughrea; Referee: Christy Browne

18 October 2015; 11:00; Qualifier Round 1	Killimordaly	0-12 - 0-12	Cappataggle	Duggan Park, Ballinasloe; Referee: Gerry Donoghue

24 October 2015; 13:00; Qualifier Round 2	Cappataggle	1-20 - 1-14	Tommy Larkin's	St. Brendan's Park, Loughrea; Referee: Shane Hynes

31 October 2015; 15:00; Qualifier Round 2	Beagh	1-17 - 1-15	Killimordaly	Duggan Park, Ballinasloe; Referee: Peter Murphy

7 November 2015; 13:30; Qualifier Round 3	Cappataggle	1-16 - 1-13	Beagh	Duggan Park, Ballinasloe; Referee: Eoin Shaughnessy

Qualifier Round 3	Killimordaly	v	Tommy Larkin's	St. Brendan's Park, Loughrea

==== Qualifier Group B ====
Pos	Team	Pld	W	D	L	SF	SA	Diff	Pts
1	Castlegar	3	3	0	0	1-38	2-26	9	6
2	Kilnadeema-Leitrim	2	1	0	1	1-41	1-29	12	2
3	Mullagh	2	1	0	1	4-27	0-32	7	2
4	Kiltormer	3	0	0	3	0-23	3-42	-28	0

11 October 2015; 14:30; Qualifier Round 1	Kilnadeema-Leitrim	0-27 - 0-10	Kiltormer	Killimor; Referee: Liam Gordon

11 October 2015; 15:30; Qualifier Round 1	Castlegar	0-19 - 1-12	Mullagh	St. Brendan's Park, Loughrea; Referee: Shane Hynes

24 October 2015; 14:00; Qualifier Round 2	Castlegar	1-19 - 1-14	Kilnadeema-Leitrim	Duggan Park, Ballinasloe; Referee: John Keane

24 October 2015; 14:30; Qualifier Round 2	Mullagh	3-15 - 0-13	Kiltormer	St. Brendan's Park, Loughrea; Referee: Shane Hynes

31 October 2015; 13:30; Qualifier Round 3	Castlegar	Conceded by Kiltormer	Kiltormer

Qualifier Round 3	Mullagh	v	Kilnadeema-Leitrim

==== Qualifier Group C ====
Pos	Team	Pld	W	D	L	SF	SA	Diff	Pts
1	Ardrahan	2	2	0	0	5-26	1-25	13	4
2	Clarinbridge	2	1	0	1	1-24	4-25	-10	2
3	Tynagh-Abbey/Duniry	2	0	0	2	2-29	3-29	-3	0

17 October 2015; 16:30; Qualifier Round 1	Ardrahan	3-12 - 0-9	Clarinbridge	Gort; Referee: Michael Haverty

26 October 2015; 14:00; Qualifier Round 2	Clarinbridge	1-15 - 1-13	Tynagh-Abbey/Duniry	Duggan Park, Ballinasloe; Referee: Michael Haverty

7 November 2015; 15:00; Qualifier Round 3	Ardrahan	2-14 - 1-16	Tynagh-Abbey/Duniry	Duggan Park, Ballinasloe; Referee: Christopher Browne

==== Qualifier Group D ====
Pos	Team	Pld	W	D	L	SF	SA	Diff	Pts
1	Turloughmore	2	2	0	0	3-43	2-26	20	4
2	Athenry	2	1	0	1	0-35	2-30	-1	2
3	Carnmore	2	0	0	2	2-21	1-43	-19	0

17 October 2015; 16:00; Qualifier Round 1	Turloughmore	1-23 - 2-11	Carnmore	Kenny Park, Athenry; Referee: John McDonagh

24 October 2015; 15:30; Qualifier Round 2	Athenry	0-20 - 0-10	Carnmore	Ballinderreen; Referee: Derek Kelly

1 November 2015; 12:00; Qualifier Round 3	Turloughmore	2-20 - 0-15	Athenry	Clarinbridge; Referee: Shane Hynes

=== Shield Competition ===
The group winners from the Senior A Qualifiers will contest the shield semi finals.

Semi-finals
21 February 2016 - Ardrahan
Cappataggle	1-15
Ardrahan	0-13
21 February 2016 - Turloughmore
Turloughmore	0-13
Castlegar	0-8

Final
5 March 2016 - Cappataggle
Cappataggle	2-13
Turloughmore	1-21

==== Shield Semi-finals ====
21 February 2016; 11:00; Shield Semi-final	Turloughmore	0-13 - 0-8	Castlegar	Turloughmore; Referee: Paul Fahy
21 February 2016; 11:00; Shield Semi-final		Report		Turloughmore; Referee: Paul Fahy

28 February 2016; 12:00; Shield Semi-final	Cappataggle	1-15 - 0-13	Ardrahan	Ardrahan; Referee: Derek Kelly

==== Shield Final ====
5 March 2016; 16:00; Shield Final	Turloughmore	1-21 - 2-13	Cappataggle	Cappataggle

== Scoring ==
=== Top Scorers ===
Pos	Player	Team	Tally	Pld	Avg	Total
1	Niall Healy	Craughwell	8-75	9	11	99
2	Tadhg Haran	Liam Mellows	5-52	6	11.1	67
3	Joe Canning	Portumna	3-55	5	12.8	64
4	Ger Farragher	Castlegar	4-37	5	9.8	49
5	Jason Flynn	Tommy Larkin's	1-45	5	9.6	48

=== Top Goal Scorers ===
Pos	Player	Team	Tally	Pld	Avg	Total
1	Niall Healy	Craughwell	8	9	0.88	8
=2	Aonghus Callanan	Liam Mellows	5	6	0.83	5
=2	Tadhg Haran	Liam Mellows	5	6	0.83	5
=4	Enda Concanon	Castlegar	4	5	0.8	4
=4	Ger Farragher	Castlegar	4	5	0.8	4
