= Seánie =

Seánie or Seanie is a given name. Notable people with the name include:

- Seánie Barry (born 1945), Irish hurler
- Seánie Duggan (1922–2013), Irish hurler
- Seánie McGrath (born 1975), Irish hurler
- Seánie McMahon (born 1972), Irish hurler
- Seánie O'Leary (born 1952), Irish hurler
