= Seánie Duggan =

Irish hurler (1922–2013)

Personal information
- Native name: Seán Duagáin (Irish)
- Born: 2 November 1922 College Road, Galway, Ireland
- Died: 26 September 2013 (aged 90) Merlin Park, Galway, Ireland

Sport
- Sport: Hurling
- Position: Goalkeeper
Club
- Years: Club
- Liam Mellows
Club titles
- Galway titles: 2
Inter-county
Years	County	Apps (scores)
1943-1953	Galway	12 (0-00)
Inter-county titles
- Connacht titles: 0
- All-Irelands: 0
- NHL: 1

Seán "Seánie" Duggan (2 November 1922 – 26 September 2013) was an Irish hurler who played as a goalkeeper for the Galway senior team.

Born in Galway, Duggan arrived on the inter-county scene at the age of twenty-one when he first linked up with the Galway senior team. He made his debut in the 1943 championship. Duggan went on to play a key part as the last line of defence for more than a decade, however, he enjoyed little success in terms of silverware. He was an All-Ireland runner-up on one occasion.

Duggan represented the Connacht inter-provincial team at various times throughout his career, winning one Railway Cup medal in 1947. At club level, he won two championship medals with Liam Mellows.

Throughout his career, Duggan made 12 championship appearances for Galway. His retirement came following Galway's defeat by Cork in the 1953 All-Ireland final.

His brothers, Jimmy and Paddy, all played with distinction for Galway, while their sister, Monica, was a renowned camogie player.

Duggan is widely regarded as one of the greatest hurlers in the history of the game. He has been repeatedly voted onto teams made up of the sport's greats, including as goalkeeper on a special Team of the Century composed of players never to have won an All-Ireland medal.

== Playing career ==
=== Club ===
Duggan played his club hurling with his local Liam Mellows club and enjoyed some success. He won back-to-back county titles with the club in 1945 and 1946.

=== Inter-county ===
Duggan first came to prominence on the inter-county scene when he made his debut in a 7-0 to 6-2 All-Ireland semi-final defeat by Antrim in 1943.

The rest of the decade saw Galway lose consecutive All-Ireland semi-finals.

In 1951 Galway made a long-overdue breakthrough on the national scene. A 6-7 to 3-4 defeat of Wexford secured victory in the "home" National Hurling League final. A narrow 2-11 to 2-8 defeat of New York in the actual league final gave Duggan a National League medal.

Two years later in 1953, Galway defeated a star-studded Kilkenny team in the penultimate stage of the championship. This victory allowed Duggan's side to advance to the All-Ireland final where Cork provided the opposition. The game itself is remembered as one of the ugliest championship deciders ever and is clouded in controversy due to the injury to the Galway captain, Mick Burke. Galway lost the game by 3-3 to 0-8. After the match at the Gresham Hotel in Dublin a fight broke out when another Galway player struck Cork's Christy Ring. The following morning another fight broke out when another member of the Galway panel attempted to hit Ring. The fights, however, ended just as quickly as they had started. This defeat brought the curtain down on Duggan's inter-county career.

=== Inter-provincial ===
Duggan also lined out with Connacht in the inter-provincial hurling competition. He won his sole Railway Cup medal in 1947 as his side defeated Munster.
