= Kevin Hynes =

Irish hurler

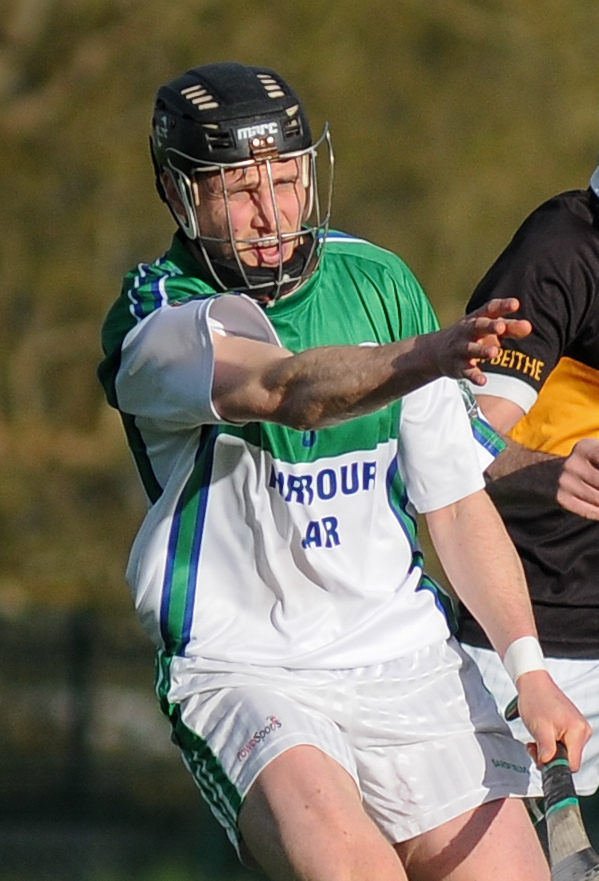
- Hynes in 2015

Personal information
- Native name: Caoimhín Ó hEidhin (Irish)
- Born: 28 May 1986 (age 40) Ballinasloe, Ireland
- Occupation: Regional Sales Manager
- Height: 6 ft 0 in (183 cm)

Sport
- Sport: Hurling
- Position: Midfield
Club
- Years: Club
- 2004-: Sarsfields
Club titles
- Galway titles: 1
Inter-county*
Years	County	Apps (scores)
2009-2014	Galway	10 (1-8)
Inter-county titles
- Leinster titles: 1
- All-Irelands: 0
- NHL: 1
- All Stars: 0
- *Inter County team apps and scores correct as of 15:00, 9 Sept 2012.

Kevin Hynes (born 28 May 1986) is an Irish hurler who played as a full-back for the Galway senior team.

Hynes made his first appearance for the team during the 2009 championship and eventually established himself as the first-choice full-back. An All-Ireland-winning captain in the under-21 grade, he has won Leinster and National Hurling League medals at senior level.

At club level Hynes plays with the Sarsfields senior hurling team, and in the Galway Senior Hurling Championship, Hynes won his first senior county winners medal on 22 November in the 2015 county final v Craughwell at Pearse Stadium.

== Honours ==
- Galway Senior Hurling Championship (1): 2015
- Leinster Senior Hurling Championship (1): 2012
- National Hurling League (1): 2010
- Walsh Cup (1): 2010
- All-Ireland Under-21 Hurling Championship (1): 2007 [c]
- All-Ireland Minor Hurling Championship (1): 2004

Achievements
Preceded by Michael Fennelly (Kilkenny)	All-Ireland Under-21 Hurling Final winning captain 2007	Succeeded by James Dowling (Kilkenny)
