= Jimmy Hegarty =

Irish hurler

Jimmy Hegarty (born 1940) was a hurling goalkeeper for Galway between 1957 and 1983. Jimmy started his career with the Galway minor hurling team in 1957 when he played against Tipperary in an All Ireland Semi Final. He played his club hurling for Liam Mellows and Castlegar in Galway, Roscrea in county Tipperary and Emerald Hurling club in London. He began his senior career with Galway in 1960 when he impressed as a substitute against Waterford in the Munster Championship.
