= Sarsfields GAA (Galway) =

Gaelic sports club in County Galway, Ireland

Sarsfields Galway
- Na Sairséalaigh
- Founded: 1966
- County: Galway
- Colours: White and Green
- Grounds: Bullaun and New Inn
- Coordinates: 53.247774°N 8.554371°W

Playing kits
Standard colours

Senior Club Championships
	All Ireland	Connacht champions	Galway champions
Hurling:	2	6	7
Camogie:	4	-	9

Sarsfields Galway is a GAA club consisting of the parish of Bullaun, New Inn and Woodlawn in east County Galway, Ireland. Winners of two All-Ireland Senior Club Hurling Championship's.

The club was founded in 1966 and is almost exclusively concerned with the game of hurling.

Sarsfields Galway were the first club to defend their All-Ireland Club Hurling title. In 1993 Sarsfields defeated opponents Kilmallock of Limerick in their first All-Ireland club final. In 1994, Sarsfields retained their club title with a victory over Tipperary champions Toomevara.

== History ==
Prior to 1966, two clubs St. Killians (of New Inn), and Bullaun existed in the parish. During 1966 a ruling known as "The Parish Rule" allowed only one club per parish, which forced the decision to amalgamate the two clubs together, thus Sarsfields Galway was affiliated in 1966. The reason for choosing the name Sarsfields is not precisely known, however, the name is linked to Patrick Sarsfield where verbal history tells that Sarsfield and his Irish Jacobite army passed through the parish while retreating from the Battle of Aughrim in 1691. The name "Sarsfields" is almost certainly influenced by Thurles Sarsfields who were kingpins of Tipperary hurling at that time.

== Notable players ==
- Kevin Hynes
- Joseph Cooney
- Michael Conneely
- Joe Cooney
- Jimmy Cooney
- Pádraig Kelly
- Michael 'Hopper' McGrath
- Darren Morrissey

== All-Ireland medal winners from Sarsfields ==
This is a list of club players that have won All-Ireland medals with the Club and/or Galway Inter-County senior hurling teams.

List is incomplete

Player	Galway Senior	Galway U-21	Galway Minor	Club
Joe Cooney	1987, 1988	1986	1983	1993, 1994
Michael 'Hopper' McGrath	1987, 1988	1983		1993, 1994
Michael Kenney	1988	1986		1994
Peter Kelly		1993	1992	
Paraic Forde		1996	1994	
Michael Conneely	1980			
Jimmy Cooney	1980			
Michael Mulkerins	1980			
Mattie Conneely		1978		
Joe McGrath		1993		
Gerry McGrath		1991		
Patrick McMahon			1999	
Tommy Kenny		1983		
Brendan Cooney		1986		
John Cooney			2019	
Alex Connaire			2019	

== Honours ==
=== Hurling ===
- All-Ireland Senior Club Hurling Championships: 2
  - 1993, 1994.
- All-Ireland Junior B Club Hurling Championships: 1
  - 2023
- Connacht Senior Club Hurling Championships: 6
  - 1980, 1989, 1992, 1993, 1995, 1997
- Galway Senior Club Hurling Championships: 7
  - 1980, 1989, 1992, 1993, 1995, 1997, 2015.
- Galway Intermediate Hurling Championship: 1
  - 1976.
- Galway Junior Club Hurling Championship: 4
  - Galway Junior A Hurling Championship: 1996
  - Galway Junior B Hurling Championship: 1985, 2007, 2022
  - Galway Junior C Hurling Championship: 1992, 2001, 2019
- Other Galway Club Hurling Championships:
  - Galway Minor B Hurling Championship: 2000
  - Galway Under-21 A Hurling Championship: 1984, 2006, 2008
  - Galway Under-20 A1 Hurling Championship: 2021

=== Football ===
- Galway Junior Club Football Championship: 1
  - Junior C – North: 2013
  - Galway Junior C Football Championship: 2013
- Galway Club Football League: 1
  - Division 4B North: 2013

=== Camogie ===
- All-Ireland Senior Club Camogie Championships: 4
  - 2019-2020, 2021-22, 2022, 2024
- Galway Senior Camogie Championships: 9
  - 2016, 2017, 2019, 2020, 2021, 2022, 2023, 2024, 2026

=== Golf ===
- Annual All-Ireland GAA Golf Challenge 2
  - 2011.
  - 2012.
