= Jimmy Duggan (hurler) =

Irish hurler (1930–2023)

Personal information
- Native name: Séamus Ó Duagáin (Irish)
- Nickname: Jamsey
- Born: 1930 Galway, Ireland
- Died: 29 October 2023 (aged 93) Galway, Ireland
- Occupation: Printing office manager
- Height: 5 ft 7 in (170 cm)

Sport
- Sport: Hurling
- Position: Right wing-forward
Clubs
- Years: Club
- Liam Mellows; Galway City
Club titles
- Galway titles: 4
Inter-county*
Years	County	Apps (scores)
1951-1967	Galway	17
Inter-county titles
- Munster titles: 0
- All-Irelands: 0
- NHL: 1
- *Inter County team apps and scores correct as of 22:55, 10 February 2014.

James Duggan (1930 – 29 October 2023) was an Irish hurler. At club level he played with Liam Mellows, and also lined out at inter-county level with the Galway senior hurling team.

== Career ==
Born in the College Road of Galway, Duggan first played competitive hurling whilst at school at St Patrick's College. He first played at inter-county level with Galway as a member of the minor team before later lining out with the junior team. Duggan joined the senior team during their successful 1950-51 National Hurling League campaign. He was an All-Ireland SHC final runner-up in 1953, 1955 and 1958.

Duggan's club career saw him win four Galway SHC medals with the Liam Mellows club. He also earned selection to the Connacht team in the Railway Cup and was also part of the Rest of Ireland team. Duggan also became an accomplished referee during his playing days and refereed the 1964 All-Ireland minor final, the 1965 All-Ireland under-21 final and the 1966 Railway Cup final.

== Personal life and death ==
Duggan's brothers, Seánie and Paddy, also played hurling for Galway, while their sister, Monica, played camogie for Galway. He spent his working life with Kelly Office Printing and retired after reaching the position of manager. Duggan was also involved in the promotion of underage hurling in Galway and held numerous officer roles in divisional boards and at county level and served as vice-chairman of the Galway County Board for a period.

Duggan died on 29 October 2023, at the age of 93.

== Honours ==
Liam Mellows

- Galway Senior Club Hurling Championship: 1954, 1955, 1968, 1970

Galway

- National Hurling League: 1950-51

Sporting positions
Preceded by Séamus Cullinane	Galway senior hurling team captain 1955	Succeeded by
