= Joseph Cooney =

Galway hurler (born 1991)

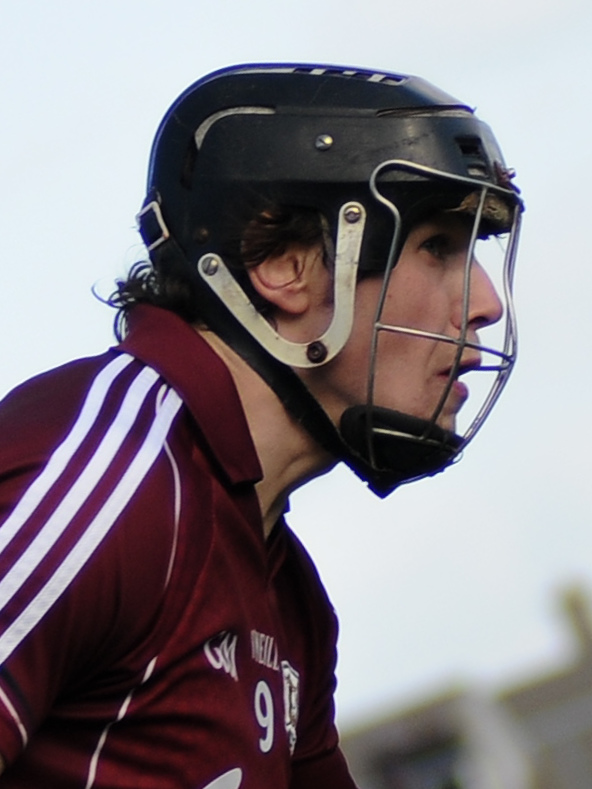

Personal information
- Native name: Seosamh Ó Cuana (Irish)
- Born: 28 March 1991 (age 35) Ballinasloe, County Galway, Ireland
- Height: 6 ft 4 in (193 cm)

Sport
- Sport: Hurling
- Position: Left wing-back
Club
- Years: Club
- 2008–: Sarsfields
Club titles
- Galway titles: 1
College
- Years: College
- University of Galway
College titles
- Fitzgibbon titles: 0
Inter-county
Years	County	Apps (scores)
2012–	Galway	35 (4–31)
Inter-county titles
- Leinster titles: 3
- All-Irelands: 1
- NHL: 2
- All Stars: 0

Joseph Cooney (born 28 March 1991) is an Irish hurler who plays for Galway Senior Championship club Sarsfields and at inter-county level with the Galway senior hurling team. He currently lines out as a left wing-back.

== Personal life ==
Born in Ballinasloe, County Galway, Cooney was born into a strong hurling family. His father, Joe, and his uncle, Jimmy, both played with Galway and won All-Ireland medals with the Galway senior team of the 1980s.

== Playing career ==
=== St Brigid's College ===
Cooney first came to prominence as a hurler with St Brigid's College in Loughrea. Having played in every grade he was appointed captain of the senior team in his final year. On 13 April 2009, Cooney captained the team to the All-Ireland Championship after lining out at midfield in the 3–18 to 1–14 defeat of Roscrea Community School.

=== University of Galway ===
During his studies at the University of Galway, Cooney joined the senior hurling team after lining out with the freshers' team in his first year. He played in several Fitzgibbon Cup campaigns without success.

=== Sarsfields ===
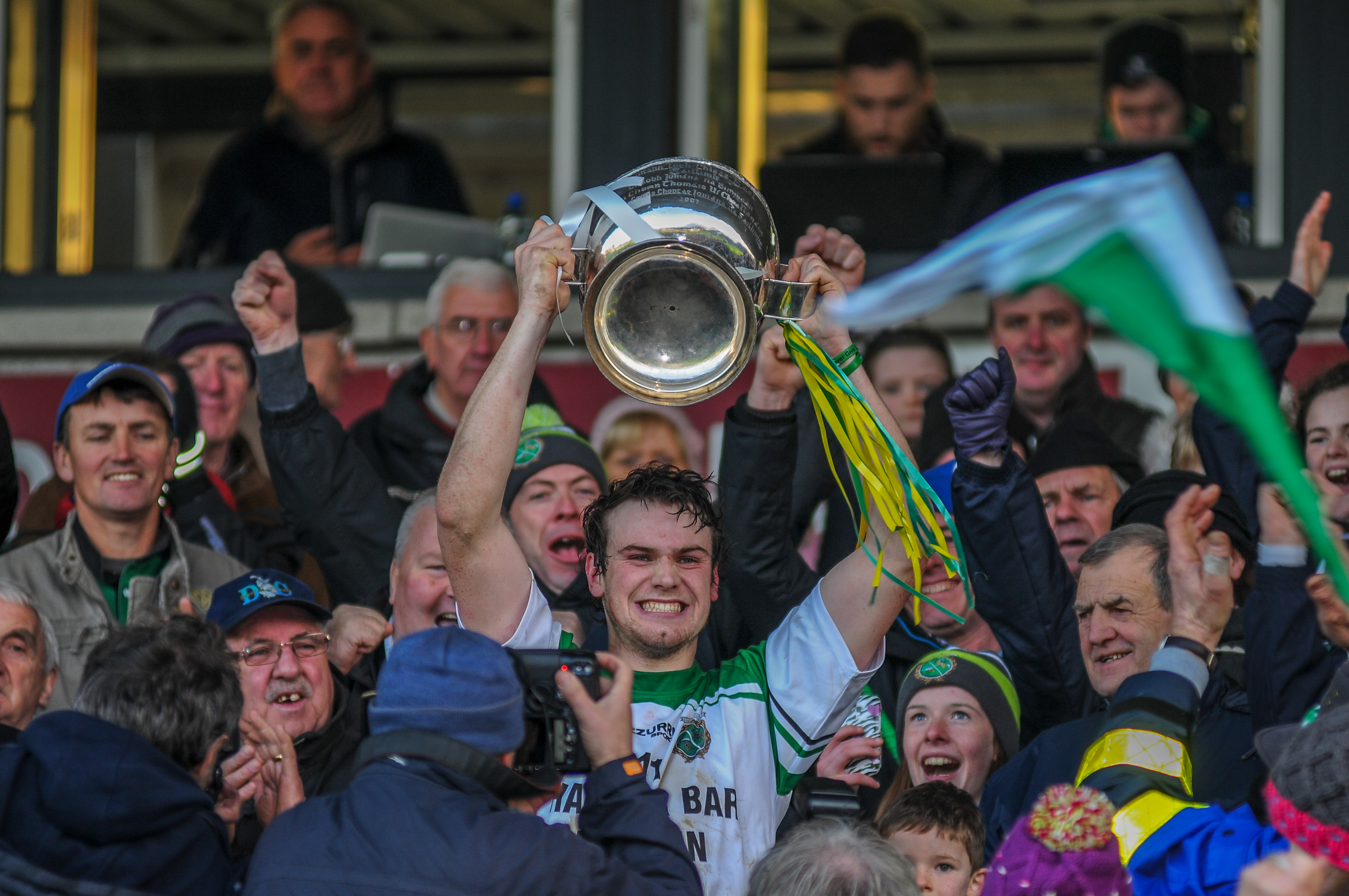
Cooney captained Sarsfields to the championship in 2015.

Cooney joined the Sarsfields club at a young age and played in all grades at juvenile and underage levels before eventually joining the club's top adult team in the Galway Senior Championship. On 8 November 2015, he captained Sarsfields in the final against Craughwell. Cooney scored a point from centre-forward in the 0-12 apiece draw. He retained his position for the replay and scored a goal in the 2–10 to 0–14 victory.

=== Galway ===
==== Minor and under-21 ====
Cooney first lined out for Galway as a member of the minor team during the 2009 All-Ireland Championship. He made his first appearance for the team on 25 July 2009 when he scored a point from left wing-back in a 4–23 to 0–10 defeat of Antrim. Cooney was again selected at left wing-back when Galway faced Kilkenny in the All-Ireland final. He ended the game with a winners' medal following a 2–15 to 2–11 victory.

Cooney was added to the Galway under-21 team in advance of the 2010 All-Ireland Championship. He made his first appearance for the team on 21 August 2010 when he was introduced as a substitute in Galway's 2–14 to 1–10 defeat of Dublin in the All-Ireland semi-final. Cooney was again selected amongst the substitutes when Galway faced Tipperary in the All-Ireland final on 11 September 2010. He was introduced as a substitute for Eoin Forde but ended the game on the losing side following a 5–22 to 0–12 defeat.

After being dropped from the team for the 2011 All-Ireland Championship, Cooney returned to the panel the following year. He made his last appearance for the team on 25 August 2012 in a 4–15 to 2–15 defeat by Kilkenny in the All-Ireland semi-final.

==== Senior ====
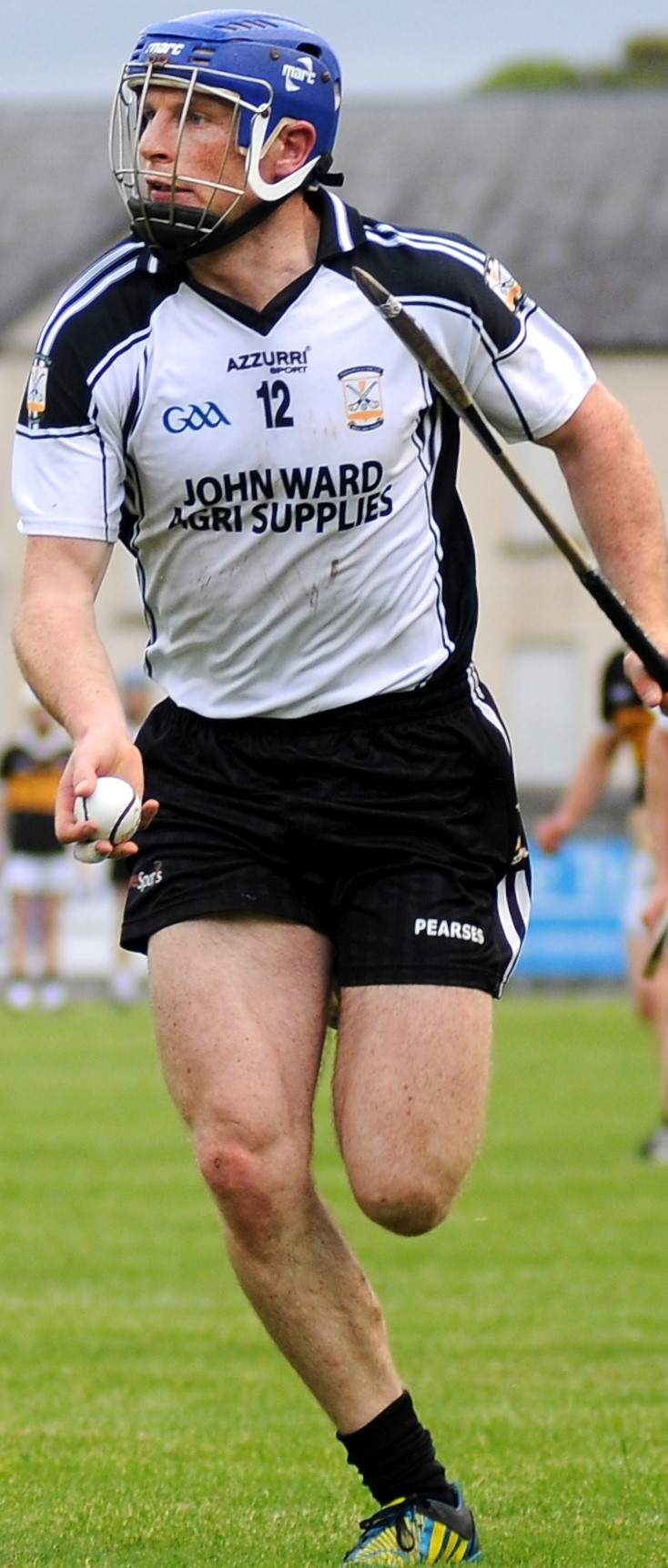
Cooney made his championship debut as a substitute for Cyril Donnellan (above) in the 2012 Leinster final.

Cooney was added to the Galway senior team in advance of the 2012 National League. He made his first appearance on 26 February 2012 when he came on as a substitute from Conor Cooney at right wing-forward in a 0–20 to 0–13 defeat of Dublin. On 8 July 2012, Cooney won a Leinster Championship medal in his debut game after coming on as a substitute for Cyril Donnellan in a 2–21 to 2–12 defeat of Kilkenny in the final. On 9 September 2012, he started the All-Ireland final against Kilkenny on the bench but was introduced as a substitute for Niall Burke in the 0–19 to 2–13 draw. The replay on 30 September 2012 saw Cooney come on as a substitute for Niall Donoghue, however, Galway were defeated by 3–22 to 3–11.

On 7 July 2013, Cooney lined out at left wing-back when Galway suffered a 2–25 to 2–13 defeat by Dublin in the Leinster final.

Cooney was selected as a substitute when Galway faced Kilkenny in the Leinster final on 5 July 2015. He came on as a substitute for Aidan Harte in the 1–25 to 2–15 defeat. On 6 September 2015, Cooney was an unused substitute when Galway suffered a 1–22 to 1–18 defeat by Kilkenny in the All-Ireland final.

On 3 July 2016, Cooney scored two points from centre-forward in Galway's 1–26 to 0–22 defeat by Kilkenny in the Leinster final.

On 22 April 2017, Cooney lined out at left wing-forward when Galway faced Tipperary in the National League final. He was held scoreless but ended the game with a winners' medal following the 3–21 to 0–14 victory. The subsequent championship saw Galway qualify for a Leinster final meeting with Wexford. Cooney scored five points and collected a second winner's medal after the 0–29 to 1–17 victory. On 3 September 2017, Canning was at right wing-forward when Galway faced Waterford in the All-Ireland final. He scored three points in the 0–26 to 2–17 victory and a first All-Ireland Championship for Galway in 29 years.

On 1 July 2018, Cooney scored a point from play in Galway's 0-18 apiece draw with Kilkenny in the Leinster final. The replay a week later saw him collect a third provincial medal after scoring a point in Galway's 1–28 to 3–15 victory. On 19 August 2018, Canning was at right wing-forward when Galway faced Limerick in the All-Ireland final. He scored three points during the game, however, Limerick won their first title in 45 years after a 3–16 to 2–18 victory.

=== Connacht ===
Cooney was added to the Leinster team for the 2012 Inter-provincial Championship. He made his first appearance for the team on 4 March 2012 when he lined out at left wing-back in a 2–19 to 1–15 defeat by Leinster in the final.

On 3 March 2013, Cooney lined out in a second successive Inter-provincial final with Connacht. He scored a point from play but ended on the losing side after a 1–22 to 0–15 defeat by Munster.

After a two-year absence, Cooney was again selected for the Connacht team for the 2016 Inter-provincial Championship. He made his final appearance in the competition on 15 December 2016 when he scored a goal in a 1–14 to 1–12 defeat by Leinster in the semi-final.

== Career statistics ==
As of match played 13 June 2021.

Team	Year	National League			Leinster		All-Ireland		Total	
Team	Year	Division	Apps	Score	Apps	Score	Apps	Score	Apps	Score
Galway	2012	Division 1A	5	0-00	1	0-00	2	0-00	8	0-00
Galway	2013	Division 1A	6	0-02	2	0-00	1	0-01	9	0-03
Galway	2014	Division 1A	2	0-00	2	0-00	1	0-00	5	0-00
Galway	2015	Division 1A	6	1-06	3	1-00	2	0-01	11	2-07
Galway	2016	Division 1A	1	0-00	3	1-04	2	1-03	6	2-07
Galway	2017	Division 1B	7	1-05	2	0-06	2	0-02	11	1-13
Galway	2018	Division 1B	4	2-08	6	1-10	3	0-03	13	3-21
Galway	2019	Division 1B	0	0-00	3	0-01	—		3	0-01
Galway	2020	Division 1A	0	0-00	2	0-01	2	0-02	4	0-03
Galway	2021	Division 1A	5	0-03	0	0-00	0	0-00	5	0-03
Total			36	4-24	24	3-22	15	1-12	75	8-58

== Honours ==
Sarsfields

- Galway Senior Hurling Championship (1): 2015 (c)

Galway

- All-Ireland Senior Hurling Championship (1): 2017
- Leinster Senior Hurling Championship (3): 2012, 2017, 2018
- National Hurling League Division 1 (2): 2017, 2021
- All-Ireland Minor Hurling Championship (1): 2009
