= New Inn, County Galway =

New Inn An Cnoc Breac
- Village
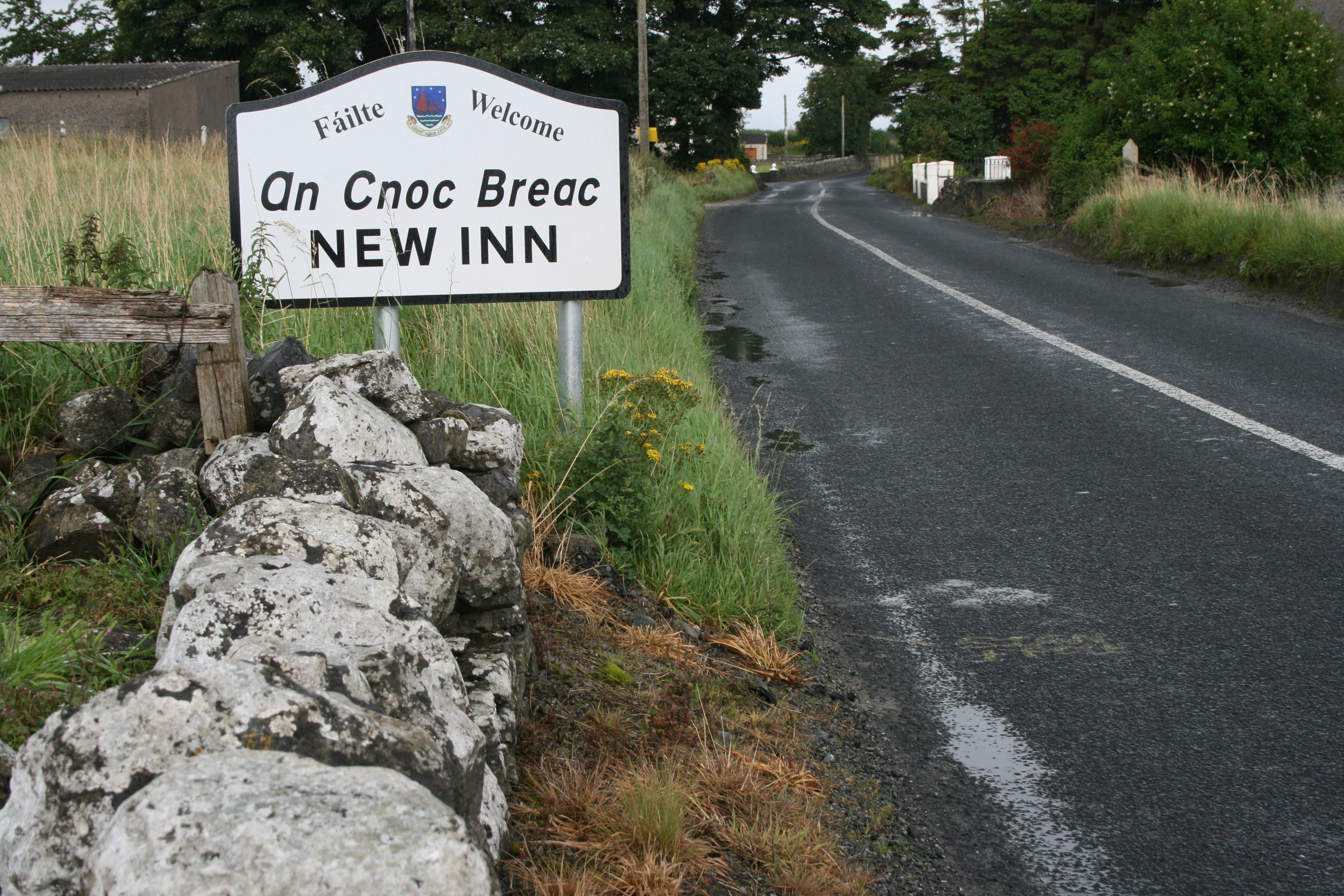

- Location in Ireland
- Coordinates: 53°18′08″N 8°29′15″W
- Country: Ireland
- Province: Connacht
- County: County Galway
- Time zone: UTC+0 (WET)
  - Summer (DST): UTC-1 (IST (WEST))

New Inn, historically Knockbrack (Irish: an Cnoc Breac, meaning 'the speckled hill'), is a village in east County Galway, Ireland. It lies mostly within the townland of Knockbrack, 14 km (8.7 mi) northeast of Loughrea. The village is on the Eiscir Riada, a series of hills which stretches across the Great Plains of Ireland. There are many ancient forts or raths scattered throughout the parish, as represented in local placenames such as Rathally and Rathglass. The townland of Grange, to the west of New Inn, contains a cemetery wherein lies the ruins of a Cistercian monastery. The Dunkellin River flows through New Inn and rises in nearby Woodlawn.

== Festival ==
The Mummers' Festival in New Inn is a seasonal (Christmas) festival which is hosted and promoted by the community council. It is designed to give entertainers a platform to demonstrate their talents and continue the Mummer tradition in rural Ireland.

== See also ==
- List of towns and villages in Ireland
