= Aonghus Callanan =

Irish dual player of Gaelic football and hurling

Personal information
- Born: 1985 (age 40–41) Galway, Ireland
- Height: 1.83 m (6 ft 0 in)

Sport
- Position: Right Half Forward
Clubs
- Years: Club
- 2002– 2004–2016: Liam Mellows (hurling); Salthill–Knocknacarra (football)
Club titles
	Football	Hurling
Galway titles	2	1
Leinster titles	1	0
All-Ireland titles	1	0
College
- Years: College
- Limerick IT
College titles
- Fitzgibbon titles: 2
Inter-county
Years	County	Apps (scores)
2005–2013	Galway	? (2-15)
Inter-county titles
	Football	Hurling
League titles		1

Aonghus Callanan (born 1985) is an Irish sportsman. He played for the Galway senior hurlers from 2005 to 2013. He plays club hurling with Liam Mellows and his Gaelic football with Salthill–Knocknacarra.

Callanan plays his club hurling with his local Liam Mellows club in Galway. He has had some success at underage level including a Minor A Championship and the club won a senior county championship in 2017. Callanan plays his club football with his local Salthill-Knocknacarra club in Galway. He has success at all grades in underage level and won an All Ireland Club Title in 2006.

Callanan left the Galway panel in 2012 to travel Australia but returned to the panel for the 2013 season.
