= Tadhg Haran =

Galway hurler

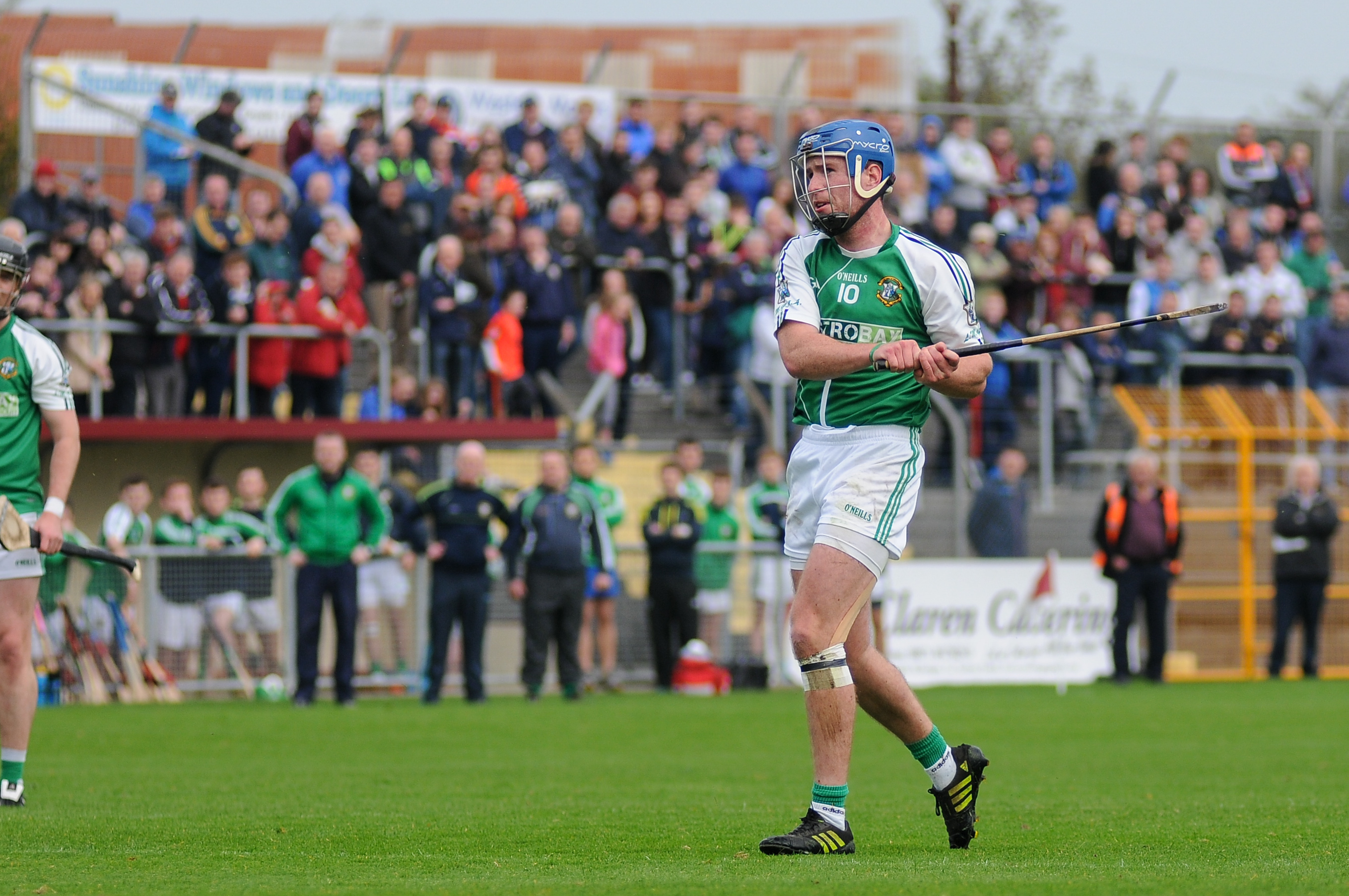
- Tadhg Haran in 2015

Personal information
- Native name: Tadhg Ó hEáráin (Irish)
- Born: 6 September 1991 (age 35) Galway, Ireland
- Height: 1.85 m (6 ft 1 in)

Sport
- Sport: Hurling
- Position: Midfield, Half-forward
Clubs
- Years: Club
- Liam Mellows (hurling); Salthill–Knocknacarra (football)
Inter-county
- Years: County
- 2012–2013, 2019: Galway
Inter-county titles
- Leinster titles: 1

Tadhg Haran (born 6 September 1991) is an Irish hurler who plays as a midfielder for Liam Mellows and the Galway senior hurling team.

Haran made his first appearance for the senior team during the 2012 championship and immediately became a regular impact sub. An All-Ireland medalist in the minor and under-21 grades, Haran has won one Leinster medal in the senior grade.

Haran plays his club hurling for Liam Mellows.

In August 2017, he won the All-Ireland Poc Fada Championship.
