= Liam Mellows GAA =

Gaelic sports club in Galway, Ireland

Liam Mellows
- Cumann Iománaíochta Liam Uí Mhaoilíosa
- Founded: 1933
- County: Galway
- Colours: Green and White
- Grounds: Ballyloughane
- Coordinates: 53.27089°N 9.02240°W

Playing kits
Standard colours

Senior Club Championships
	All Ireland	Connacht champions	Galway champions
Hurling:	-	1	6

Liam Mellows GAA is a Gaelic Athletic Association club located in Renmore, a suburb of Galway City, Ireland. The club is primarily concerned with the game of hurling and camogie. The club is named after IRB member Liam Mellows.

On 12 November 2017, Liam Mellows reached their first Galway Senior Hurling Championship final since 1970 after defeating Cappataggle by 0-13 to 1-9 in Athenry. On 3 December 2017 they beat Gort to win the championship.

They were defeated by the All Ireland Champions Cuala in the semi-final in Thurles.

On 21 October 2023, Liam Mellows GAA club won their first Galway Junior A Camogie Championship. Niamh McPeake was named the "player of the game".

== Hurling Titles ==
- Connacht Senior Club Hurling Championships:
  - 1970
- Galway Senior Hurling Championships:
  - 1935, 1945, 1946, 1968, 1970, 2017
- Galway Minor Hurling Championship
  - 1947, 2003

== Camogie Titles ==
- Galway Intermediate Camogie Championship
  - 2026
- Galway Junior A Camogie Championship
  - 2023

== Notable players ==
- David Collins
- Tadhg Haran
- Jimmy Hegarty
- John Lee
- Jimmy Duggan
