= 1979–80 All-Ireland Senior Club Hurling Championship =

All-Ireland Senior Club Hurling Championship 1979–80
Championship Details
- Dates: 7 October 1979 – 1 June 1980
- Teams: 29

All Ireland Champions
- Winners: Castlegar (1st win)
- Captain: Michael Connolly

All Ireland Runners-up
- Runners-up: McQuillans-Ballycastle

Provincial Champions
- Munster: Blackrock
- Leinster: Crumlin
- Ulster: McQuillan's
- Connacht: Castlegar

Championship Statistics
- Matches Played: 29
- Top Scorer: Frank Keenan (4–17)

The 1979–80 All-Ireland Senior Club Hurling Championship was the 10th staging of the All-Ireland Senior Club Hurling Championship, the Gaelic Athletic Association's premier inter-county club hurling tournament. The championship ran from 7 October 1979 to 1 June 1980.

Blackrock of Cork were the defending champions, however, they were beaten by Castlegar in the All-Ireland Semi-final. Causeway of Kerry, Killyon of Meath and Kinnitty of Offaly made their championship debuts.

The All-Ireland final was played at Páirc Tailteann in Navan on 1 June 1980, between Castlegar of Galway and Ballycastle McQuillans of Antrim, in what was a first championship meeting between the teams and a first ever Connacht-Ulster final. Castlegar won the match by 1–11 to 1–08 and became the first team from Galway to win the title.

Frank Keenan was the championship's top scorer with 4–17.

== Connacht Senior Club Hurling Championship ==
=== Connacht first round ===
14 October 1979 First round	Craobh Rua	0–09 – 1–04	St Finbarr's	Markievicz Park

11 November 1979 First round	Tooreen	1–03 – 2–14	Tremane	Ballyhaunis Grounds
	A Henry 1–0, J Henry 0–2, J Cunnane 0–1.		J Kilroy 2–2, S Kilroy 0–8, M Keane 0–3, M Reynolds 0–1.

=== Conancht semi-final ===
25 November 1979 Semi-final	Tremane	9–17 – 1–03	Craobh Rua	Athleague Sportsfield
	J Kilroy 3–7, S Kilroy 2–2, M Keane 2–1, J Coyne 1–1, J Brennan 1–1, S Farrell 0–2, M Connell 0–1, T Kelly 0–1, R Farrell 0–1.		V Lynch 1–0, B Ryan 0–3.

=== Connacht final ===
30 March 1980 Final	Castlegar	1–16 – 1–09	Tremane	Athleague Sportsfield
	Joe Connolly 0–6, G Connolly 0–5, P Burke 1–0, John Connolly 0–2, G Glynn 0–1, S Fahy 0–1, T Connolly 0–1.		S Kilroy 0–7, J Lynch 1–0, J Kilroy 0–1, T Kelly 0–1.

== Leinster Senior Club Hurling Championship ==
=== Leinster first round ===
28 October 1979 First round	Killyon	2–06 – 1–02	Carlow	St Loman's Park
	J Mitchell 1–0, S Ryan 1–0, L Tyrrell 0–3, J Connolly 0–2, M Dempsey 0–1.		P Cassin 1–0, L McGough 0–1, W Power 0–1.

28 October 1979 First round	Naomh Moninne	0–03 – 6–13	Carnew Emmets	St Brigid's Park
			S Doyle 1–4, Ml Doyle 2–0, P Brennan 1–2, Mick Doyle 1–0, M Byrne 1–0, E Hilliard 0–3, P Doyle 0–2, T Collins 0–2.

11 November 1979 First round	Kinnitty	2–14 – 3–05	Ardclough	St Brendan's Park
	M Corrigan 0–7, J Flaherty 1–3, B Kennedy 1–0, M Cleere 0–2, D Corrigan 0–1, P Corrigan 0–1.		R Burke 1–2, E Walsh 1–0, M Dwan 1–0, W Cullen 0–1, J Walsh 0–1.

=== Leinster quarter-finals ===
11 November 1979 Quarter-final	Killyon	2–02 – 2–07	Crumlin	St Loman's Park
	J Mitchell 2–0, S Ryan 0–1, L Tyrrell 0–1.		D Hickey 1–1, L Broderick 1–1, P Kavanagh 0–2, D Murphy 0–2, P McCarthy 0–1.

11 November 1979 Quarter-final	Camross	6–12 – 3–09	Castletown Geoghegan	O'Moore Park
	F Keenan 3–8, J Dooley 1–2, M Delaney 1–0, T Keenan 1–0, M Cuddy 0–1, PJ Cuddy 0–1.		E Clarke 0–6, W Lowry 1–1, G Jackson 1–0, F Clarke 1–0, M Jackson 0–1, P Dalton 0–1.

25 November 1979 Quarter-final	Kinnitty	3–16 – 0–06	Ballyhale Shamrocks	St Brendan's Park
	M Corrigan 0–14, P Corrigan 1–0, D Corrigan 1–0, T Carroll 1–0, M Cleere 0–1, D Egan 0–1.		L Fennelly 0–2, L Moloney 0–2, G Fennelly 0–2.

25 November 1979 Quarter-final	Carnew Emmets	1–05 – 4–13	Rathnure	Aughrim County Ground
	S Doyle 1–2, T Collins 0–2, S Brennan 0–1.		J Murphy 2–0, D O'Connor 1–3, J Redmond 1–0, J Conran 0–3, M Quigley 0–3, D Quigley 0–3, J Houlihan 0–1.

=== Leinster semi-finals ===
2 March 1980 Semi-final	Camross	3–10 – 2–12	Rathnure	Nowlan Park
	F Keenan 1–4, PJ Cuddy 1–1, M Cuddy 1–0, T Keenan 0–2, M Collier 0–2, T Cuddy 0–1.		J Conran 1–2, D O'Connor 0–5, P Codd 1–0, M Quigley 0–2, D Quigley 0–2, J Higgins 0–1.

2 March 1980 Semi-final	Crumlin	1–13 – 0–09	Kinnitty	Nowlan Park
	J Kealey 1–8, L Broderick 0–3, D Hickey 0–1, B Donovan 0–1.		T Carroll 0–7, J Egan 0–2.

=== Leinster final ===
23 March 1980 Final	Crumlin	3–05 – 0–11	Camross	Geraldine Park
	B Donovan 2–1, M Reynolds 1–1, D Murphy 0–2, P McCarthy 0–1.		F Keenan 0–5, S Bergin 0–3, Mick Cuddy 0–1, Martin Cuddy 0–1, M Collier 0–1.

== Munster Senior Club Hurling Championship ==
=== Munster quarter-finals ===
21 October 1979 Semi-final	Dunhill	3–09 – 2–08	Sixmilebridge	Páirc Uí Bhriain
	T Casey 1–3, T Moore 1–2, J Raher 1–0, F Murphy 0–1, J Power 0–1, P Walsh 0–1, R Power 0–1.		F Quilligan 1–2, P Morey 1–1, L Quinlivan 0–3, S Stack 0–1, G McInerney 0–1.

11 November 1979 Quarter-final	Kilruane MacDonagh's	2–08 – 4–06	Blackrock	MacDonagh Park
	S Hennessy 1–5, D Whelan 1–0, S Keogh 0–2, J Williams 0–1.		T Lyons 2–0, P Moylan 1–1, E O'Sullivan 1–1, E O'Donoghue 0–2, D Buckley 0–2.

=== Munster semi-finals ===
11 November 1979 Quarter-final	Causeway	1–04 – 3–08	Dunhill	Páirc Naomh Breandán
	P Moriarty 1–1, M Leahy 0–1, P Bunyan 0–1, J O'Connell 0–1.		J Grogan 3–2, T Casey 0–2, B Power 0–1, S Cooke 0–1, T Moore 0–1, J Raher 0–1.

25 November 1979 Semi-final	Blackrock	6–08 – 1–06	Patrickswell	Páirc Uí Chaoimh
	R Cummins 2–0, D Buckley 1–2, P Moylan 1–1, E O'Sullivan 1–1, E O'Donoghue 1–1, T Lyons 0–1, T Cashman 0–1, P Kavanagh 0–1.		R Bennis 1–3, G Hayes 0–2, S Foley 0–1.

=== Munster final ===
9 December 1979 Final	Blackrock	0–13 – 1–08	Dunhill	Páirc Uí Chaoimh
	F O'Sullivan 0–3, R Cummins 0–2, P Kavanagh 0–2, P Moylan 0–2, E O'Donoghue 0–1, D Buckley 0–1, T Cashman 0–1, D Collins 0–1.		J Crogan 1–3, T Casey 0–3, S Cooke 0–1, R Power 0–1.

== Ulster Senior Club Hurling Championship ==
=== Ulster quarter-final ===
14 October 1979 Quarter-final	Cúchullains	4–06 – 2–04	Kevin Lynchs	Randalstown
	E Donaldson 2-0, Paul Devlin 1-3, Paddy Devlin 1-0, G Devlin 0-1, J Carlisle 0-1, T Duffy 0-1.		JA Mullan 2-0, P Murphy 0-2, J O'Kane 0-1, F Kennedy 0-1.

=== Ulster semi-final ===
27 October 1979 Semi-final	Cúchullains	2–07 – 3–10	Ballycran	Athletic Grounds
	J Corvan 1-2, P Devlin 0-5, T Duffy 1-0.		B Gordon 3-0, B Mullan 0-7, B Savage 0-1, T Brown 0-1, G Blaney 0-1.

=== Ulster final ===
11 November 1979 Final	Ballycastle McQuillans	0–11 – 0–08	Ballycran	St Patrick's Park
	P Boyle 0-5, S Boyle 0-2, E Donnelly 0-2, B Donnelly 0-1, O Laverty 0-1.		B Mullan 0-6, B Caldwell 0-1, G Blaney 0-1.

== All-Ireland Senior Club Hurling Championship ==
=== All-Ireland quarter-final ===
6 April 1980 Quarter-final	Blackrock	4–15 – 1–10	Brian Borus	Páirc Uí Chaoimh
	E O'Donoghue 1–6, D Collins 2–2, D Buckley 1–4, J Horgan 0–1, P Moylan 0–1, P Butler 0–1.		P McCormack 1–1, J Lynch 0–3, B Connolly 0–2, P O'Neill 0–1, R Duggan 0–1, M Connolly 0–1, M Brennan 0–1.

=== All-Ireland semi-finals ===
27 April 1980 Semi-final	Ballycastle McQuillans	3–09 – 0–08	Crumlin	Croke Park
	E Donnelly 2–3, P Boyle 0–4, B Donnelly 1–0, T Donnelly 0–1, O Laverty 0–1.		J Kealy 0–6, T Grealish 0–1, B Donovan 0–1.

25 May 1980 Semi-final	Castlegar	2–09 – 0–09	Blackrock	Páirc Naomh Mhuire
	Joe Connolly 2–2, M Connolly 0–3, G Connolly 0–2, J Francis 0–1, G Glynn 0–1.		D Collins 0–2, R Cummins 0–1, J O'Grady 0–1, E O'Sullivan 0–1, P Moylan 0–1, D McCurtain 0–1, F Cummins 0–1, D Buckley 0–1.

=== All-Ireland final ===
1 June 1980 Final	Castlegar	1–11 – 1–08	Ballycastle McQuillans	Páirc Tailteann
	Joe Connolly 0–8, L Mulryan 1–0, G Connolly 0–1, John Connolly 0–1, J Francis 0–1.		P Boyle 0–7, O Laverty 1–0, T Barton 0–1.

== Championship statistics ==
=== Top scorers ===
Rank	Player	Club	Tally	Total	Matches	Average
1	Frank Keenan	Camross	4–17	29	3	9.66
2	Jackie Kilroy	Tremane	5–10	25	3	8.33
3	Séamus Kilroy	Tremane	2–17	23	3	7.66
4	Joe Connolly	Castlegar	2–16	22	3	7.33
5	Mark Corrigan	Kinnitty	0–21	21	2	10.50
6	John Grogan	Dunhill	4–05	17	3	5.66
6	Jim Kealy	Crumlin	1–14	17	4	4.25
8	Éamonn O'Donoghue	Blackrock	2–10	16	5	3.20
8	Danny Buckley	Blackrock	2–10	16	5	3.20
8	Peter Boyle	Ballycastle McQuillans	0–16	16	3	5.33

=== Miscellaneous ===
- Blackrock of Cork set the all-time record by winning a fifth Munster title.
- Crumlin become the first team from Dublin to win the Leinster title.
- The All-Ireland final between Castlegar and McQuillan's was a unique affair as it was the first final to feature teams from Connacht and Ulster. Castlegar win the All-Ireland for the first time in their history, thus becoming the first Connacht team to win the title.
