= 1984–85 All-Ireland Senior Club Hurling Championship =

All-Ireland Senior Club Hurling Championship 1984–85
Championship Details
- Dates: 30 September 1984 – 24 March 1985
- Teams: 28

All Ireland Champions
- Winners: St. Martin's (1st win)
- Captain: Johnny Brennan
- Manager: Tom Neville

All Ireland Runners-up
- Runners-up: Castlegar
- Captain: Michael Connolly
- Manager: Patsy Durnin

Provincial Champions
- Munster: Sixmilebridge
- Leinster: St. Martin's
- Ulster: Ballycastle McQuillans
- Connacht: Castlegar

Championship Statistics
- Matches Played: 28
- Top Scorer: Tom Moran (7–16)

The 1984–85 All-Ireland Senior Club Hurling Championship was the 15th staging of the All-Ireland Senior Club Hurling Championship, the Gaelic Athletic Association's premier inter-county club hurling tournament. The championship began on 30 September 1984 and ended on 24 March 1985.

Ballyhale Shamrocks of Kilkenny were the defending champions, however, they failed to qualify after being beaten by St Martin's in the 1984 Kilkenny SHC final.

The All-Ireland final, a replay, was played at Semple Stadium in Thurles on 24 March 1985, between St Martin's of Kilkenny and Castlegar of Galway, in what was a first championship meeting between the teams. St Martin's won the match by 1–13 to 1–10 to claim their only title.

Tom Moran was the championship's top scorer with 7–16.

== Results ==
=== Connacht Senior Club Hurling Championship ===
First round

30 September 1984 First round	Gortletteragh	2–09 – 1–06	Craobh Rua	Páirc Seán Mac Diarmada, Carrick
	T Ward 1–0, M Quinn 1–0, S Heslin 0–2, G Dorrigan 0–2, M Dorrigan 0–2, T McLoughlin 0–2, E McGowan 0–1.		B Lynch 1–2, A Kinsella 0–3, J Keegan 0–1.

Second round

20 October 1984 Second round	Gortletteragh	0–02 – 10–09	Pádraig Pearses	Páirc Seán Mac Diarmada, Carrick
			M Scott 7–3, G Burke 3–1, A Barrett 0–2, T Costello 0–1, T Carey 0–1, A Dooley 0–1.

Semi-final

10 November 1984 Semi-final	Pádraig Pearses	0–06 – 0–11	Tooreen	Páirc an Phiarsaigh, Woodmount
	A Dooley 0–4, T Flynn 0–1, K Dooley 0–1.		J Cunnane 0–3, J Henry 0–2, A Henry 0–2, S Rogers 0–2, T Henry 0–1, V Henry 0–1.	Referee: J Kelly (Galway)

Final

25 November 1984 Final	Tooreen	2–07 – 2–14	Castlegar	Aghamore GAA Park, Aghamore
	E Burke 2–0, J Cunnane 0–6, J Henry 0–1.		M O'Shea 0–7, J Connolly 1–1, G Connolly 1–1, M Murphy 0–3, M Costello 0–2.

=== Leinster Senior Club Hurling Championship ===
Preliminary round

30 September 1984 Preliminary round	Naomh Moninne	3–14 – 1–11	Slasher Gaels	Clan na Gael Park, Dundalk
	J Kennedy 2–6, H Smith 1–2, P Callan 0–3, B Brady 0–2, T Murphy 0–1.		E Reilly 1–4, R Foley 0–5, E Martin 0–1, E Kennedy 0–1.

First round

13 October 1984 First round	O'Toole's	1–14 – 3–06	Éire Óg	Laurence O'Toole Park, Dublin
	P Kearns 1–1, P Carton 0–4, B Carton 0–3, J Morris 0–2, S Kearns 0–2, K Phelan 0–1, D Sinnott 0–1.		F Johnson 3–1, N O'Donoghue 0–2, B Power 0–1, P Johnson 0–1, G Power 0–1.

14 October 1984 First round	Naomh Moninne	0–09 – 0–14	Carnew Emmets	Páirc an Chuinnigh, Knockbridge
	J Kennedy 0–3, P Callan 0–2, H Smith 0–2, B Brady 0–1, T Murphy 0–1.		S Kennedy 0–6, J Molloy 0–2, T Sullivan 0–2, L Molloy 0–2, S Brennan 0–2.

20 October 1984 First round	St. Mullin's	1–06 – 1–17	Killyon	Dr. Cullen Park, Carlow
	J Ryan 0–4, JJ Murphy 1–0, P Murphy 0–1, J Kavanagh 0–1.		L Tyrrell 1–5, J Connolly 0–5, P Gannon 0–5, T Raleigh 0–2.

Quarter-finals

10 November 1984 Quarter-final	O'Toole's	0–13 – 2–13	St. Martin's	Laurence O'Toole Park, Dublin
	P Carton 0–5, B Carton 0–5, T Synnott 0–1, P Kearns 0–1, M Morris 0–1.		T Moran 1–4, R Moloney 1–0, J Moran 0–3, J Brennan 0–3, J Morrissey 0–2, E Morrissey 0–1.

11 November 1984 Quarter-final	Killyon	1–04 – 2–12	Buffer's Alley	St. Loman's Park, Trim
	J Tyrrell 1–2, P Massey 0–2.		M Butler 1–3, T Doran 1–1, G Sweeney 0–4, S O'Leary 0–2, P Butler 0–2.

11 November 1984 Quarter-final	Carnew Emmets	0–02 – 3–14	Kinnitty	Aughrim County Ground, Aughrim
	P Doyle 0–1, B Molloy 0–1.		M Corrigan 1–5, D Egan 2–0, P Corrigan 0–4, S Corrigan 0–3, P Delaney 0–1, C Spain 0–1.

11 November 1984 Quarter-final	Portlaoise	3–16 – 0–10	Raharney	Kelly Daly Park, Rathdowney
	M Keegan 1–3, L Bergin 0–6, Joe Keenan 1–2, M Cashin 1–1, M Bohane 0–2, J Bohane 0–1, Jim Keenan 0–1.		J McManus 0–3, M Doyle 0–2, F Sheils 0–2, D Lynch 0–1, J O'Donoghue 0–1, S Greville 0–1.	Referee: G Kirwan (Offaly)

Semi-finals

25 November 1984 Semi-final	Kinnitty	2–20 – 0–05	Portlaoise	Geraldine Park, Athy
	P Corrigan 0–6, M Corrigan 1–2, G Coughlan 1–1, J Flaherty 0–3, P Delaney 0–3, S Donoghue 0–2, D Egan 0–2, S Coughlan 0–1.		B Bohane 0–4, M Keegan 0–1.

25 November 1984 Semi-final	St. Martin's	4–12 – 2–08	Buffer's Alley	Geraldine Park, Athy
	J Brennan 1–7, R Moloney 2–2, T Moran 1–0, P Lawlor 0–2, P Moran 0–1.		M Butler 0–6, T Doran 1–0, B Murphy 1–0, M Casey 0–1, G Sweeney 0–1.

Final

2 December 1984 Final	St. Martin's	2–11 – 0–12	Kinnitty	Geraldine Park, Athy
	T Moran 2–4, J Brennan 0–4, J Morrissey 0–2, J Moran 0–1.		P Corrigan 0–7, S Donoghue 0–2, P Delaney 0–1, G Coughlan 0–1, J Flaherty 0–1.

=== Munster Senior Club Hurling Championship ===
Quarter-finals

4 November 1984 Quarter-final	St. Finbarr's	1–07 – 2–10	Sixmilebridge	Páirc Uí Chaoimh, Cork
	J Meyler 1–3, D Walsh 0–1, S Murphy 0–1, T Finn 0–1, C Ryan 0–1.		J McInerney 2–6, T Morey 0–1, P Morey 0–1, J Chaplin 0–1, F Quilligan 0–1.

26 November 1984 Quarter-final	Patrickswell	1–14 – 1–06	Tallow	Gaelic Grounds, Limerick
	R Bennis 0–8, G Kirby 0–4, G Hayes 1–0, F Nolan 0–1, S Kirby 0–1.		P Curley 1–2, M Beecher 0–2, P Dooley 0–1, S Pratt 0–1.	Referee: G Long (Tipperary)

Semi-finals

26 November 1984 Semi-final	Sixmilebridge	4–19 – 1–09	Ballyduff	Cusack Park, Ennis
	E Healy 2–2, D Chaplin 1–3, P Morey 0–6, J Chaplin 0–4, PJ Fitzpatrick 1–0, G McInerney 0–2, T Morey 0–1, S Cusack 0–1.		J O'Sullivan 1–1, J Hennessy 0–3, J Bunyan 0–3, M Hennessy 0–1, M O'Sullivan 0–1.	Referee: G Molyneaux (Limerick)

2 December 1984 Semi-final	Patrickswell	2–12 – 0–06	Moycrakey-Borris
	R Bennis 1–5, G Hayes 0–4, G Kirby 1–0, A Carmody 0–2, F Nolan 0–1.		John Flanagan 0–3, T Mullins 0–1, J Bergin 0–1, Jim Flanagan 0–1.

Final

16 December 1984 Final	Sixmilebridge	4–10 – 2–06	Patrickswell	Semple Stadium, Thurles
	G McInerney 1–5, D Chaplin 1–1, PJ Fitzpatrick 1–0, E Healy 1–0, P Morey 0–2, T Morey 0–2.		R Bennis 1–1, F Nolan 1–1, S Foley 0–2, A Carmody 0–1, S Kirby 0–1.	Referee: G Long (Tipperary)

=== Ulster Senior Club Hurling Championship ===
Semi-finals

30 September 1984 Semi-final	Middletown Na Fianna	2–09 – 3–20	Ballycastle McQuillans	Derrynoose

30 September 1984 Semi-final	Kevin Lynch's	1–05 – 3–05	Ballycran	Kevin Lynch Park, Dungiven
	L McIlhinney 1–0, D Keeley 0–2, E Keeley 0–1, N McMullen 0–1.		D O'Prey 2–0, B Hughes 1–0, D Hughes 0–2, B Gilmore 0–1, C O'Prey 0–1.

Final

14 October 1984 Final	Ballycran	1–03 – 1–14	Ballycastle McQuillans	McKenna Park, Ballycran
	J Coyle 1–0, H Gilmore 0–3.		C McVeigh 0–6, P Boyle 1–2, B Donnelly 0–2, P McKillen 0–2, E Donnelly 0–1, O Laverty 0–1.

=== All-Ireland Senior Club Hurling Championship ===
Quarter-final

16 December 1984 Quarter-final	Castlegar	4–12 – 0–03	St. Gabriel's	Pearse Stadium, Galway
	John Connolly 2–2, M Murphy 1–3, M O'Shea 0–4, J Connolly 1–0, T Murphy 0–2, J Coyne 0–1.		L McDonagh 0–2, T Hoctor 0–1.

Semi-finals

3 March 1985 Semi-final	St. Martin's	3–15 – 2–07	Ballycastle McQuillans	John Locke Park, Callan
	T Moran 1–3, R Moloney 1–3, E Morrissey 1–1, J Brennan 0–4, J Moran 0–1, P Lawlor 0–1, J Morrissey 0–1, D Coonan 0–1.		E Donnelly 1–2, P McKillen 1–0, P Boyle 0–3, B Donnelly 0–2.	Referee: G Ryan (Tipperary)

3 March 1985 Semi-final	Castlegar	3–05 – 1–05	Sixmilebridge	Pearse Stadium, Galway
	M Murphy 2–0, G Connolly 1–0, J Connolly 0–2, M O'Shea 0–2, M Glynn 0–1.		E Healy 1–0, G McInerney 0–2, P Morey 0–2, F Quilligan 0–1.

Final

17 March 1985 Final	St. Martin's	2–09 – 3–06	Castlegar	Croke Park, Dublin
	T Moran 2–3, J Moran 0–2, P Moran 0–1, R Moloney 0–1, J Brennan 0–1, D Coonan 0–1.		M O'Shea 1–4, G Connolly 1–0, J Connolly 1–0, S Fahy 0–1, G Glynn 0–1.	Referee: G Ryan (Tipperary)

24 March 1985 Final replay	St. Martin's	1–13 – 1–10	Castlegar	Semple Stadium, Thurles
	J Brennan 0–6, D Coonan 1–1, T Moran 0–2, P Moran 0–2, J Moran 0–1, E Morrissey 0–1.		M O'Shea 0–6, J Connolly 1–2, M Murphy 0–2.	Referee: G Ryan (Tipperary)

== Championship statistics ==
=== Top scorers ===
Top scorers overall

Rank	Player	Club	Tally	Total	Matches	Average
1	Tom Moran	St. Martin's	7–16	37	6	6.16
2	Johnny Brennan	St. Martin's	1–25	28	6	5.66
3	Martin O'Shea	Castlegar	1–23	26	5	5.20
4	Mike Scott	Pádraig Pearses	7-03	24	2	12.00
4	Gerry McInerney	Sixmilebridge	3–15	24	4	6.00
5	John Connolly	Castlegar	5-07	22	5	4.40
6	Richie Bennis	Patrickswell	2–14	20	3	6.66
7	Richard Moloney	St. Martin's	4-06	18	6	3.00
8	Michael Murphy	Castlegar	3-08	17	5	3.20
9	Paddy Corrigan	St. Rynagh's	0–17	17	3	5.66
