= Killeen (disambiguation) =

Killeen is a city in Bell County, Texas, and is the only place with that name in the United States.

Killeen is also a common place name in Ireland and less commonly, Northern Ireland and may also refer to:

== Places ==
=== Northern Ireland ===
- Killean, County Armagh, or Killeen, a village in County Armagh
- Killeen, County Down, a townland in County Down
- Killeen, County Tyrone, a townland in County Tyrone

=== Ireland ===
- Killeen, County Cork, a village in County Cork
- Killeen, County Laois, a village in County Laois
- Killeen, County Mayo, a village in County Mayo
- Killeen, County Meath, a village in County Meath
- Killeen, County Tipperary, a townland in County Tipperary
- Killeen, County Westmeath, a townland in the civil parish of Castletownkindalen, barony of Moycashel

=== United States ===
- Killeen Air Force Station, Killeen, Texas

== Other uses ==
- Killeen (surname)
- Killeen Castle (disambiguation)

== See also ==
- Cillín, a historical children's burial place
