= 1989 All-Ireland Senior Hurling Championship final =

1989 All-Ireland Senior Hurling Final
- Event: 1989 All-Ireland Senior Hurling Championship
Tipperary	Antrim
4-24	3-9
- Date: 3 September 1989
- Venue: Croke Park, Dublin
- Man of the Match: Nicky English
- Referee: P. Delaney (Laois)
- Attendance: 65,496
- Weather: Sunny

The 1989 All-Ireland Senior Hurling Championship Final was the 102nd All-Ireland Final and the culmination of the 1989 All-Ireland Senior Hurling Championship, an inter-county hurling tournament for the top teams in Ireland. The match was held at Croke Park, Dublin, on 3 September 1989, between Tipperary, managed by Bab's Keating and Antrim, managed by Jim Nelson. The game was shown live in Ireland on Network 2 with match commentary provided by Ger Canning and comments throughout provided by Jimmy Magee. The Ulster champions lost to their Munster opponents on a scoreline of 4-24 to 3-9.

Tipperary had led at halftime by 1-13 to 0-5, with their goal coming from Declan Ryan, who scored when his high long-range shot for a point hit the hurley of the Antrim goalkeeper Niall Patterson on its way into the net after 18 minutes.

The game is notable for a number of reasons. This was Antrim's second-ever appearance in an All-Ireland final, some forty-six years after they lost to Cork at the same stage of the championship. Nicky English set a scoring record for a single player in the modern era as he notched up 2-12 to win his first All-Ireland Senior medal. The victory for Tipperary, eighteen years after their last in 1971, also preserved the county's unique record of winning an All-Ireland title in every decade of the GAA's existence. Tipperary was captained by Bobby Ryan.

== Match details ==
1988-09-01
15:15 UTC+1
Final

Tipperary	4-24 – 3-9	Antrim
N. English (2-12), D. Ryan (1-3), P. Fox (1-2), J. Leahy (0-3), D. Carr (0-2), M. Cleary (0-2).	Report	B. Donnelly (1-1), O. McFetridge (0-3), A. McCarry (1-0), D. Armstrong (1-0), T. McNaughton (0-2), P. McKillen (0-1), L. McKeegan (0-1), D. McKillop (0-1).

Croke Park, Dublin
Attendance: 65,496
Referee: P. Delaney (Laois)

Tipperary	Antrim

TIPPERARY:
GK	1	Ken Hogan
RCB	2	John Heffernan
FB	3	Conor O'Donovan
LCB	4	Noel Sheehy
RWB	5	Conal Bonnar
CB	6	Bobby Ryan (c)
LWB	7	John Kennedy
M	8	Colm Bonnar
M	9	Declan Carr
RWF	10	John Leahy (substituted off)
CF	11	Declan Ryan
LWF	12	Michael Cleary (substituted off)
RCF	13	Pat Fox
FF	14	Cormac Bonnar (substituted off)
LCF	15	Nicky English
Substitutes:
FF		Joe Hayes for Cormac Bonnar (substituted on)
RWF		Donie O'Connell for J. Leahy (substituted on)
LWF		Aidan Ryan for M. Cleary (substituted on)

ANTRIM:
GK	1	Niall Patterson
RCB	2	Gary O'Kane (substituted off)
FB	3	T. Donnelly
LCB	4	Dessie Donnelly
RWB	5	James McNaughton
CB	6	Dominic McKinley (substituted off)
LWB	7	Leonard McKeegan
M	8	Paul McKillen
M	9	D. McMullan (substituted off)
RWF	10	Ciaran Barr (c)
CF	11	Aiden McCarry
LWF	12	Olcan McFetridge
RCF	13	Donal Armstrong
FF	14	Brian Donnelly
LCF	15	Terence 'Sambo' McNaughton
Substitutes:
M		Danny McNaughton for D. McMullan (substituted on)
CF		Darren McKillop for G. O'Kane (substituted on)
RCF		M. Sullivan for D. McKinley (substituted on)

MATCH RULES

- 70 minutes
- Replay if scores level
- Maximum of 3 substitutions
