= Ellen Crowe =

New Zealand homemaker and community leader

Ellen Crowe (c.1847 – 24 January 1930) was a New Zealand homemaker and community leader.

== Biography ==
She was born in Ballindooley, County Galway, Ireland, in c.1847.

She was the daughter of Bridget Cody and John Silke of Ballindooley, parish of Castlegar, County Galway, about 1847. When about 12 or 13, she was promised in marriage to John Crowe, but by the time Ellen was 18 or 19, he had immigrated to New Zealand. Ned Crowe, John's brother, visited the family to tell them that John would send for Ellen.

Silke was one of several hundred single women who received free passages from Ireland to New Zealand in the late 1860s under a Canterbury provincial government immigration scheme. Ellen travelled with Catherine Francis and Mary Broderick, also from Galway. The three sailed from London on the Bombay, arriving at Lyttelton on 18 August 1866.

It is unknown how she spent her first eighteen months, but it was probably in service. She married Crowe at Christchurch's Catholic church on 24 February 1868. Following their marriage, the couple lived outside Temuka, near Milford, where many of their nine children were born. Ellen nominated her sister, Mary, widowed mother, Bridget, and brothers John, Martin, William, and Patrick, for passage to New Zealand between 1871 and 1876.

Crowe became "a central figure in her small community ... part of the Irish Catholic enclave within Southland's predominantly Scots Presbyterian population." Her husband died in 1914, and she died at the home of her daughter in Otautau on 24 January 1930.
