= Killion =

Killion is an uncommon surname of Irish and German origin.

== Notable people ==
- Ann Killion (birth date unknown), American sports journalist and writer
- David T. Killion (born 1966), American government official and diplomat
- John J. Killion (1859-1937), American boxer better known as "Jake Kilrain"
- Kyle Killion (born 1984), American football linebacker
- Redley A. Killion (born 1951), Micronesian politician
- Ruth Ann Killion (1949–2021), American government statistician
- Sarah Killion (born 1992), American professional soccer player
- Sean Killion (born 1967), American swimmer
- Theophilius "Theo" Killion (birth date unknown), American businessman
- Thomas H. Killion (born 1957), American politician
- Tom Killion (born 1953), American fine art printmaker and author

== See also ==
- Ó Cillín, Celtic family name from which Killion derives
- Killian, an alternate spelling
