= 1980 All-Ireland Senior Club Hurling Championship final =

1980 All-Ireland Senior Club Hurling Championship Final
- Event: 1979–80 All-Ireland Senior Club Hurling Championship
Castlegar	McQuillan's
1-11	1-8
- Date: 1 June 1980
- Venue: Páirc Tailteann, Navan
- Referee: Nealie Duggan (Limerick)

The 1980 All-Ireland Senior Club Hurling Championship final was a hurling match played at Páirc Tailteann on 1 June 1980 to determine the winners of the 1979–80 All-Ireland Senior Club Hurling Championship, the tenth season of the All-Ireland Senior Club Hurling Championship, a tournament organised by the Gaelic Athletic Association for the champion clubs of the four provinces of Ireland. The final was contested by Castlegar of Galway and McQuillan's of Antrim, with Castlegar winning by 1-11 to 1-8.

== Match ==
=== Details ===
1 June 1980

Castlegar	1-11 - 1-8	Ballycastle McQuillan's
Joe Connolly 0-8 (8f), L Mulryan 1-0, G Connolly 0-1, J Francis 0-1, John Connolly 0-1.		O Laverty 1-0, P Boyle 0-7, T Barton 0-1.

Páirc Tailteann, Navan
Referee: N Duggan (Limerick)
