= 2010 New Zealand Derby =

The 2010 New Zealand Derby was a horse race which took place at Ellerslie Racecourse on Saturday 6 March 2010. It was the 135th running of the New Zealand Derby, and it was won by Military Move.

The race was one of the most highly anticipated runnings of the New Zealand Derby in years, with a dual Group 1-winning colt seeking to win the VRC Derby-New Zealand Derby double and two high-class fillies entered to take on the males in an attempt to secure a rare win for a filly in New Zealand's most prestigious three-year-old race.

The favourite was Zarzuela, a daughter of Zabeel who in an impressive Derby campaign won the Great Northern Guineas, Waikato Guineas and Championship Stakes.

The other top filly in the race was Katie Lee, a winner of six stakes races who in November made history by becoming the first horse to win both the New Zealand 2000 Guineas and New Zealand 1000 Guineas. Many doubted her ability to stay the 2400m of the race and perhaps that factor, combined with a gruelling 10-race campaign exclusively at stakes level and the slightly shifty track conditions of the Derby, was her undoing.

Of the male horses, the most talked about was the VRC Derby winner, Monaco Consul. The son of High Chaparral was seeking to become the first horse ever to win the VRC-New Zealand Derby double. He extinguished his chances by running out badly at the last turn.

Corporal Jones was also considered a prominent contender, having finished first or second in all five of his previous career starts. Following a close finish between Corporal Jones and Zarzuela in the Championship Stakes, pre-race commentary anticipated another close contest between he two horses in the Derby.

But in the excitement of the head-bobbing finish between those two horses in the Championship Stakes, many overlooked the strong run from well back in the field by New Zealand 2000 Guineas runner-up Military Move, who went out on Derby Day at 15–1.

It was Military Move who took the honours, though, handling the 2400m of the Derby and aided by a ride from Michael Walker. Walker, who in May 2008 was nearly killed when he fell 10m down a bank while on a pig hunting trip, celebrated the win. It was his first Group 1 win since his accident, and a race he later said he had always dreamt of winning.

== Race details ==
- Sponsor: Telecom
- Prize money: NZ$2.2 million
- Track: Good
- Number of runners: 15
- Winner's time: 2:27.91

== Full result ==
	Margin	Horse	Jockey	Trainer(s)	Odds
1		Military Move	Michael Walker	Shaune Ritchie	$15.80
2	1	Corporal Jones	Zac Purton	Andrew Scott	$7.20
3	nse	Handsome Zulu	Mark Du Plessis	John Sargent	$15.10
4	1½	Zarzuela	James McDonald	Mark Walker	$3.60
5	1¼	Time Keeper	Andrew Calder	Graeme Nicholson & Paul Allbon	$56.80
6	2	Martial Art	Vinnie Colgan	Mark Walker	$53.00
7	2¾	No Emotion	Jonathan Riddell	John Sargent	$123.30
8	3/4	Jungle Juice	Troy Harris	Donna, Dean Logan & Chris Gibbs	$88.50
9	1	Imabayboy	Michael Coleman	Trent Busuttin	$24.00
10	3/4	Ballybit	Matthew Cameron	Allan Sharrock	$81.50
11	3/4	Monaco Consul	Leith Innes	Mike & Paul Moroney	$3.40
12	1/2	Volgus	Allan Peard	Allan Sharrock	$114.90
13	3¼	Smokin' Gun	Lisa Allpress	Craig Thornton	$98.90
14	nse	Katie Lee	Opie Bosson	Graeme & Debbie Rogerson	$6.20
15	1	King Raedwald	Hayden Tinsley	Kevin Gray	$20.90

== Winner's details ==
Further details of the winner, Military Move:

- Foaled: 7 October 2006 in New Zealand
- Sire: Volksraad; Dam: All Night Party (Just A Dancer)
- Owner: Steven Lo
- Trainer: Shaune Ritchie
- Breeder: Windsor Park Stud
- Starts: 8
- Wins: 2
- Seconds: 2
- Thirds: 1
- Earnings: $1,502,775

=== The road to the Derby ===
Early-season appearances in 2009-10 prior to running in the Derby.

- Military Move – 2nd Bonecrusher Stakes, 3rd Wellington Guineas, 2nd New Zealand 2000 Guineas, 5th Wellington Stakes, 4th Waikato Guineas, 5th Championship Stakes
- Corporal Jones – 2nd Waikato Guineas, 2nd Championship Stakes
- Handsome Zulu – 2nd Wellington Stakes
- Zarzuela – 8th Levin Classic, 1st Great Northern Guineas, 1st Waikato Guineas, 1st Championship Stakes
- Time Keeper – 3rd Great Northern Guineas, 3rd Karaka Mile, 4th Championship Stakes
- Martial Art – 3rd Karaka Mile, 7th Championship Stakes
- Jungle Juice – 3rd Waikato Guineas, 13th Championship Stakes
- Imabayboy – 5th Waikato Guineas
- Smokin' Gun – 13th Waikato Guineas
- Katie Lee – 3rd Gold Trail Stakes, 1st James & Annie Sarten Memorial Stakes, 1st New Zealand 2000 Guineas, 1st New Zealand 1000 Guineas, 2nd Eulogy Stakes, 1st Eight Carat Classic, 2nd Royal Stakes, 3rd Desert Gold Stakes, 1st Sir Tristram Fillies Classic
- King Raedwald – 4th Levin Classic, 3rd Championship Stakes

=== Subsequent Group 1 wins ===
Subsequent wins at Group 1 level by runners in the 2010 New Zealand Derby.

- Time Keeper - 2010 Easter Handicap

== See also ==
- Recent winners of major NZ 3 year old races
- Desert Gold Stakes
- Hawke's Bay Guineas
- Karaka Million
- Levin Classic
- New Zealand 1000 Guineas
- New Zealand 2000 Guineas
- New Zealand Oaks
