= Paul McKillen =

Irish hurler

Personal information
- Native name: Pól Mac Coilín (Irish)
- Nickname: Humpy
- Born: June 1966 (age 60) Ballycastle, County Antrim, Northern Ireland
- Occupation: Caretaker
- Height: 6 ft 1 in (185 cm)

Sport
- Sport: Hurling
- Position: Midfield
Club
- Years: Club
- 1983-2001: McQuillan Ballycastle
Club titles
- Antrim titles: 3
- Ulster titles: 3
- All-Ireland Titles: 0
Inter-county
- Years: County
- 1984-1998: Antrim
Inter-county titles
- Ulster titles: 7
- All-Irelands: 0
- NHL: 0
- All Stars: 1

Paul McKillen (born June 1966) is a Northern Irish hurling manager and former player. At club level he played with McQuillan Ballycastle and at inter-county level with the Antrim senior hurling team.

== Playing career ==
McKillen first played hurling with the McQuillan Ballycastle club. He was still eligible for the minor grade when he won his first Antrim SHC medal after a defeat of Loughgiel Shamrocks in 1983. McKillen won a second title a year later when McQuillan's retained the title, before claiming a third and final winners' medal in 1986. Each of these three victories were subsequently converted into Ulster Club SHC title successes.

At inter-county level, McQuillan first appeared for Antrim at underage levels, however, his minor and under-21 tenures ended without any title success. McKillen made his senior team debut in 1984 and went on to win seven Ulster SHC titles in a ten-year period between 1989 and his retirement in 1998. He also lined out at midfield when Tipperary beat Antrim by 4–24 to 3-09 tin the 1989 All-Ireland final.

McKillen's other inter-county honours include a National League Division 2 medal. He also earned inclusion on the Ulster team in the Railway Cup competition. McKillen was an All-Star Award recipient in 1993.

== Management career ==
McKillen first became involved in coaching as a result of his day job as a caretaker at Cross & Passion College. He has served as a coach and selector with various college teams and was part of four Mageean Cup-winning management teams. McKillen later became involved in inter-county management as a selector with the Antrim senior hurling team that won the 2006 Christy Ring Cup after a defeat of Carlow in the final.

McKillen later served as a coach with the Down senior hurling team that lost the 2009 Christy Ring Cup final to Carlow. He later guided the Antrim minor hurling team to the Ulster MHC title in 2014. A stint as manager of the St Mary's, Rasharkin club team was followed by McKillen becoming joint-manager of the Antrim intermediate camogie team. He guided the team to the All-Ireland ICH title in 2021.

== Honours ==
=== Player ===
McQuillan Ballycastle

- Ulster Senior Club Hurling Championship: 1983, 1984, 1986
- Antrim Senior Hurling Championship: 1983, 1984, 1986

Antrim

- Ulster Senior Hurling Championship: 1989, 1990, 1991, 1993, 1994, 1996, 1998
- National Hurling League Division 2: 1991–92

=== Management ===
Cross & Passion College

- Mageean Cup: 2009, 2010, 2014, 2015, 2020

Antrim

- Christy Ring Cup: 2006
- Ulster Senior Hurling Championship: 2006
- All-Ireland Intermediate Camogie Championship: 2021
- Ulster Minor Hurling Championship: 2014
