= Patrick Hogan (racehorse breeder) =

New Zealand racehorse breeder (1939–2023)

Sir Patrick Hogan KNZM CBE
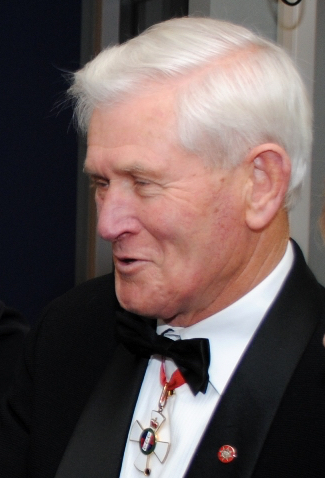
- Hogan in 2012
- Born: 23 October 1939; Rotorua, New Zealand
- Died: 6 January 2023 (aged 83); Hamilton, New Zealand
- Occupation: Thoroughbred breeder
- Known for: Cambridge Stud
- Spouse: Justine Alice Heath (m. 1962)
- Children: 2 daughters

Sir Patrick Hogan KNZM CBE (23 October 1939 – 6 January 2023) was a New Zealand breeder of Thoroughbred racehorses, based in Cambridge. He was closely associated with the champion sires Sir Tristram and Zabeel.

== Early life and family ==
Hogan was born in Rotorua on 23 October 1939. His mother was Sarah Margaret Hogan (née Small), and his father was Thomas (Tom) Hogan who emigrated from Ballindooley, County Galway, Ireland, in 1914 at the age of 19. He received his education at Hautapu Primary and St. Patrick's College, Silverstream.

In 1962, he married Justine Alice Heath, the daughter of William and Phyllis Heath. They have had two daughters.

== Career ==
Hogan was a partner in the Fencourt Stud from 1965 to 1977, and in 1977 established the Cambridge Stud, with the outstanding sire Sir Tristram.

Hogan was a chairman and vice-president of the New Zealand Thoroughbred Breeders Association, and a president of the Cambridge Jockey Club.

Sir Patrick Hogan and/or Lady Hogan have been the successful owners of a number of top race horses such as:

- Irish Chance, 1999 Auckland Cup winner.
- Katie Lee, winner of the 2009 New Zealand 1000 Guineas and New Zealand 2000 Guineas double.
- Lashed, 2004 Zabeel Classic, New Zealand International Stakes and New Zealand Stakes winner. Also runner up in the VRC Oaks.
- Smiling Like, 2001 Wellington Cup and 2000 New Zealand Cup winner.

In 2017 he sold Cambridge Stud to Brendan and Jo Lindsay.

== Personal life and death ==
Hogan died at Waikato Hospital in Hamilton on 6 January 2023, aged 83.

== Honours and awards ==
In the 1992 New Year Honours, Hogan was made a Commander of the Order of the British Empire (CBE), for services to Thoroughbred racing, and he was appointed a Knight Companion of the New Zealand Order of Merit (KNZM), for services to Thoroughbred breeding and training, in the 2000 New Year Honours.

Hogan was inducted into the Australian Racing Hall of Fame in 2005, and the New Zealand Racing Hall of Fame in 2006.

== See also ==
- Thoroughbred racing in New Zealand
