= Joe Connolly (hurler) =

Galway hurler (born 1956)

Personal information
- Native name: Seosamh Ó Conghaile (Irish)
- Born: 13 October 1956 (age 70) Castlegar, County Galway, Ireland
- Occupation: Company director
- Height: 5 ft 11 in (180 cm)

Sport
- Sport: Hurling
- Position: Centre half-forward
Club
- Years: Club
- Castlegar
Club titles
- Galway titles: 2
- Connacht titles: 2
- All-Ireland Titles: 1
Inter-county*
Years	County	Apps (scores)
1976–1984	Galway	22 (12–52)
Inter-county titles
- All-Irelands: 1
- NHL: 0
- All Stars: 1
- *Inter County team apps and scores correct as of 23:31, 18 February 2014.

Joseph Connolly (born 13 October 1956) is an Irish former hurler who played as a centre-forward at senior level for the Galway county team. After captaining Galway to All-Ireland success in 1980, ending an almost sixty-year hoodoo, Connolly echoed Pope John Paul II when he called out to a pitch covered in maroon-clad supporters: "People of Galway, we love you".

Born in Castlegar, Galway city, into a large Irish-speaking family with strong Gaeltacht roots and later a hurley-making business, Connolly first played competitive hurling whilst at school in St Mary's College, Galway. He arrived on the inter-county scene at the age of sixteen when he first linked up with the Galway minor team, before later joining the under-21 side. He made his senior debut in the 1976 championship.

Connolly went on to play a key role for Galway for almost a decade and won one All-Ireland medal. An All-Ireland runner-up on two occasions, Connolly captained Galway to the All-Ireland title in 1980. He won an All-Star Award and was named Texaco Hurler of the Year. 1980 was a memorable year for Connolly, with a Galway Junior Gaelic football title with Éire Óg to add to his hurling All-Ireland county and club titles. Connolly made 22 championship appearances for Galway. A persistent knee injury forced his inter-county retirement following the 1984 championship.

As a member of the Connacht inter-provincial team at various times, Connolly won two Railway Cup medals. At club level he is a one-time All-Ireland medallist with Castlegar. In addition, he won two Connacht medals and two championship medals. With University College Galway, Connolly won one Fitzgibbon Cup medal.

As the third eldest of the Connolly dynasty, many of his brothers, John, Pádraic, Michael, Tom, Gerry and Murt, played with distinction for Castlegar and Galway. His son, Barry Connolly, has lined out for the Dublin senior team.

In retirement from playing, Connolly became involved in team management and coaching. He has served as a selector with the Galway senior team, while at club level he also served as manager of the Castlegar senior team. Connolly received a lifetime achievement award from the Gaelic Players' Association in July 2025.

== Playing career ==
=== University ===
During his tenure at University College Galway, Connolly was a key member of the university's senior hurling team. In 1977 he lined out at full-forward as UCG reached the final of the inter-varsities championship. A 1–14 to 1–12 defeat of St Patrick's College, Maynooth gave him a Fitzgibbon Cup medal.

He earned his B.A. from the university in 1978.

=== Club ===
Connolly joined the Castlegar senior hurling panel in 1974, however, the team were beaten in their quest for three championships in-a-row.

In 1979 Connolly was a key member of the team as Castlegar reached the championship final. First-time finalists Kinvara faced an uphill battle against roll of honour leaders Castlegar. A 2–13 to 0–6 victory gave Connolly his first championship medal. Old rivals Tremane provided the opposition in the subsequent provincial decider, however, a 4–12 to 0–5 victory gave Connolly a third Connacht medal. Castlegar later became the first team from Connacht to qualify for the All-Ireland decider. Antrim and Ulster champions Ballycastle provided the opposition, as Connolly and his four brothers faced six Donnelly brothers on the opposing team. Olcan McLaverty scored a goal in the first half, however, this failed to ignite the Ballycastle attack. Five minutes into the second half Liam Mulryan turned a Connolly pass into the net to take the lead. Ballycastle cut this led to just a point, however, two points from brothers Gerry and Joe Connolly set up a 1–11 to 1–8 victory and an All-Ireland Senior Club Hurling Championship medal for Connolly.

After losing back-to-back championship decider in 1982 and 1983, Castlegar were under pressure to deliver in 1984. A 3–10 to 0–11 victory over Killimordaly gave Connolly his second championship medal. Tooreen fell by 2–15 to 2–7 in the subsequent provincial final, giving Connolly a fourth Connacht medal. Castlegar later faced St. Martin's of Kilkenny in the All-Ireland decider. Tom Moran scored two goals which seemed to put St. Martin's in the driving seat, however, a goal by Kilkenny man Martin O'Shea for Castlegar secured a draw. The replay saw Tom Moran take centre stage once again, as St. Martin's secured a 1–13 to 1–10 victory.

=== Inter-county ===
Connolly first came to prominence on the inter-county scene with the Galway minor and under-21 teams but enjoyed little success in these grades. He made his senior championship debut on 18 July 1976 in a 3–12 to 3–9 All-Ireland quarter-final defeat of Kerry.

After three years of penultimate stage defeats, Galway shocked four-in-a-row hopefuls Cork in the All-Ireland semi-final and qualified for an All-Ireland final showdown with Kilkenny in 1979. Galway went two points up twelve minutes into the second half but failed to score for the rest of the game and lost 2–12 to 1–8.

In 1980, Connolly was appointed captain as Galway defeated Kildare and Offaly to reach the final against Munster champions Limerick. The men from the west led by 2–7 to 1–5 at half-time. In all, Éamonn Cregan of Limerick scored 2–7 but Galway won 2–15 to 3–9. It was the county's first All-Ireland title since 1923. Due to the crowd celebrations on the pitch, it took Connolly ten minutes to reach the rostrum in the Hogan Stand to collect the Liam MacCarthy Cup; however, once there he delivered, in his native Irish, one of the most famous acceptance speeches of all-time.

"People of Galway, after fifty-seven years the All-Ireland title is back in Galway...It's wonderful to be from Galway on a day like today. There are people back in Galway with wonder in their hearts, but also we must remember (Galway) people in England, in America, and round the world and maybe they are crying at this moment…People of Galway, we love you!"

The final phrase is an echo of Pope John Paul II's address to the young people of Ireland the previous year. The celebrations did not just end with Connolly's speech as Joe McDonagh seized the microphone and lead the crowd in a version of the West's Awake. Connolly rounded of the year by collecting an All-Star award, as well as being named as the Texaco Hurler of the Year.

1981 saw Galway reach a third consecutive All-Ireland final. First-time finalists Offaly were the opponents. With twenty-three minutes left Galway led by six points but failed to score again to lose 2–12 to 0–15.

The following few years proved difficult as Galway were knocked out of the championship at the All-Ireland semi-final stages in 1982 and 1983. Connolly retired from inter-county hurling following a serious knee injury in 1984.

=== Inter-provincial ===
Connolly also lined out with Connacht in the inter-provincial series of games and enjoyed much success.

In 1979 Connolly was at centre-forward as Connacht reached the inter-provincial decider. A 1–13 to 1–9 defeat by Leinster was the result on that occasion. Connolly retained the same position on the team and was appointed captain in 1980 as Connacht faced Railway Cup specialists Munster in the decider. A low-scoring game followed, however, a 1–5 to 0–7 victory gave Connacht their first Railway Cup title since 1947. It was Connolly's first winners' medal in the inter-pro competition.

Connacht reached the Railway Cup final again in 1982. A 3–8 to 2–9 victory over Leinster gave Connolly his second Railway Cup medal.

== Managerial career ==
=== Galway ===
In 2008 Connolly became a selector with the Galway senior hurling team, under the management of John McIntyre. The highlight of his three years as a selector was a 2–22 to 1–17 defeat of Cork in 2010 to take the National League title.

=== Castlegar ===
Connolly has also served as manager of the Castlegar senior hurling team.

== Broadcasting ==
Connolly has served as a non-executive director of Irish-language channel TG4 for a number of years. He has also worked as an analyst on Seó Spóirt and has co-hosted reality show Jockey Eile with Seán Bán Breathnach.

== Personal life ==
Born in Castlegar on the outskirts of Galway, Connolly was educated at Briarhill national school and later attended St Mary's College. After completing his Leaving Certificate in 1974, he completed a Bachelor of Arts in Irish and Geography at University College Galway, before later qualifying as a secondary school teacher in 1979. In spite of this he later worked as a sales director with Connolly Sports, a sportswear manufacturing company.

He delivered an "inspirational" team-talk to the Connacht Rugby team before a match in April 2025.

== Honours ==
=== Player ===
University College Galway

- Fitzgibbon Cup (1): 1976–77

Castlegar

- All-Ireland Senior Club Hurling Championship (1): 1980
- Connacht Senior Club Hurling Championship (2): 1979, 1984
- Galway Senior Club Hurling Championship (2): 1979, 1984

Galway

- All-Ireland Senior Hurling Championship (1): 1980

Connacht

- Railway Cup (2): 1980 (c), 1982

=== Individual ===
Awards

- Texaco Hurler of the Year (1): 1980
- All-Star (1): 1980

Sporting positions
Preceded by Joe McDonagh	Galway Senior Hurling Captain; 1980	Succeeded by Seán Silke
Achievements
Preceded by Ger Fennelly (Kilkenny)	All-Ireland SHC winning captain 1980	Succeeded by Pádraig Horan (Offaly)
Preceded by Phil "Fan" Larkin (Leinster)	Railway Cup Hurling Final winning captain 1980	Succeeded by Joe McKenna (Munster)
Awards
Preceded by Ger Henderson (Kilkenny)	Texaco Hurler of the Year; 1980	Succeeded by Pat Delaney (Offaly)
