= 1985 All-Ireland Senior Club Hurling Championship final =

- Event: 1984–85 All-Ireland Senior Club Hurling Championship
| St. Martin's | Castlegar |
| St. Martin's | Castlegar |
| 2-9 | 3-6 |
- Date: 17 March 1985
- Venue: Croke Park, Dublin
- Referee: George Ryan (Tipperary)
- Attendance: 4,000

Replay
| St. Martin's | Castlegar |
| 1-13 | 1-10 |
- Date: 24 March 1985
- Venue: Semple Stadium, Thurles
- Referee: George Ryan (Tipperary)
- Attendance: 3,000

The 1985 All-Ireland Senior Club Hurling Championship final was a hurling match played at Croke Park on 17 March 1985 to determine the winners of the 1984–85 All-Ireland Senior Club Hurling Championship, the 15th season of the All-Ireland Senior Club Hurling Championship, a tournament organised by the Gaelic Athletic Association for the champion clubs of the four provinces of Ireland. The final was contested by St. Martin's of Kilkenny and Castlegar of Galway, with the game ending in a 2-9 to 3-6 draw. The replay took place at Semple Stadium on 24 March 1985, with St. Martin's winning by 1-13 to 1-10.

The All-Ireland final was a unique occasion as it was the first ever championship meeting between St. Martin's and Castlegar. It remains their only championship meeting at this level. Castlegar were hoping to win their second ever All-Ireland title, while St. Martin's were hoping to claim their first title.

Played as part of a triple-header as the curtain-raiser to the respective Railway Cup deciders, the All-Ireland final set the tone of the rest of the programme. St Martin’s were slow out of traps. They were headed inside the opening six minutes by 1-3 to no score. Tom Moran lifted the net from its stanchion with a free in the 12th minute and the Saints were away. By half time, the Kilkenny champions led by 1-5 to 1-4. They still led on the call of full time, but a late goal by Martin O'Shea levelled the game.

The replay a week later was more conclusive with Tom Moran once again inspiring St. Martin's. A three-point winning margin secured a first All-Ireland title for St. Martin's.

Victory for St. Martin's secured their first All-Ireland title. They became the 9th club to win the All-Ireland title, while they were the third Kilkenny representatives to claim the ultimate prize.

== Match details ==
=== Drawn match ===
17 March 1985

| St. Martin's | 2-9 - 3-6 | Castlegar |
|---|---|---|
| T Moran 2-3 (2f), Jim Morgan 0-2 (2f), P Moran 0-1, J Brennan 0-1, R Moloney 0-1, D Coonan 0-1. | | M O'Shea 1-4 (4f), John Connolly 1-0, G Connolly 1-0, S Fahy 0-1, G Glynn 0-1. |

Croke Park, Dublin
Attendance: 4,000
Referee: G Ryan (Tipperary)

| St. Martin's | Castlegar |

=== Replay ===
24 March 1985

| St. Martin's | 1-13 - 1-10 | Castlegar |
|---|---|---|
| J Brennan 0-6, D Coonan 1-1, T Moran 0-2, P Moran 0-2, É Morrissey 0-1, Jim Moran 0-1. | | M O'Shea 0-6, John Connolly 1-2, M Murphy 0-2. |

Croke Park, Dublin
Attendance: 3,000
Referee: G Ryan (Tipperary)

| St. Martin's | Castlegar |
