= McKeehan =

McKeehan is a surname. Notable people with the surname include:

- Charles Louis McKeehan (1876–1925), American judge
- Kevin Michael McKeehan (born 1964), better known as TobyMac, American musician, songwriter, and author
- Michelle McKeehan (born 1989), American swimmer

== See also ==
- McKeegan
