= Killeen (surname) =

Killeen is a surname of Irish origin that derives from Irish Gaelic O Cillin or Mac Cillin meaning "descendant of Cillin" or "son of Cillin". The surname is common in the Anglosphere. Notable people with the surname include:

- Brian Killeen (1911–1993), New Zealand rugby union player
- Caroline Killeen (1926–2014), American activist
- Danny Killeen (1933–2017), American sailor
- Donald Killeen (1923–1972), Irish-American criminal
- Evans Killeen (born 1936), American baseball player
- George Killeen (1884–1933), Irish rugby union player
- Gerry Killeen (born 1961), Irish Gaelic footballer
- Graham Killeen (born 1980), American filmmaker and critic
- Gretel Killeen (born 1963), Australian television personality
- Henry Killeen (1872–1916), American baseball player
- J. J. Killeen (born 1981), American golfer
- James Jerome Killeen (1917–1978), American Roman Catholic bishop
- Jason Killeen (born 1980), Irish basketball player
- Johanne Killeen, American chef, restaurant owner and cookbook author
- John Killeen (1920–2005), Irish hurler
- Len Killeen (1938–2011), South African rugby league footballer
- Lewis Killeen (born 1982), English football (soccer) player
- Liam Killeen (born 1982), English professional mountain biker
- Luke Killeen (born 2005), Australian speedway rider
- Mark Killeen, British actor
- Neil Killeen (born 1975), English cricketer
- Oliver Killeen (born 1937), Irish bigamist and fraudster
- Paul Killeen (footballer) (1903–1991), Australian rules footballer
- Paul Killeen (hurler) (born 1994), Irish hurler
- Peter Richard Killeen (born 1942), American psychologist
- Richard Killeen (born 1946), New Zealand painter, sculptor and digital artist
- Ryan Killeen (born 1983), American football (American football) player
- Siobhán Killeen (born 1995), Irish association football player
- Tiernan Killeen (born 2003), Irish hurler
- Timothy Killeen (1923–1993), Irish politician
- Timothy L. Killeen (born 1952), British American geophysicist, space physicist, professor, and university administrator
- Tony Killeen (born 1952), Irish politician

== See also ==
- Ó Cillín, original form of the surname
