= John Connolly (hurler) =

Irish hurler (born 1948)

Personal information
- Native name: Seán Ó Conghaile (Irish)
- Born: 14 June 1948 (age 78) Leitir Móir, County Galway, Ireland
- Occupation: Building contractor
- Height: 6 ft 1 in (185 cm)

Sport
- Sport: Hurling
- Position: Full-forward
Club
- Years: Club
- Castlegar
Club titles
- Galway titles: 6
- Connacht titles: 4
- All-Ireland Titles: 1
Inter-county*
Years	County	Apps (scores)
1967–1981	Galway	26 (11–59)
Inter-county titles
- All-Irelands: 1
- NHL: 1
- All Stars: 2
- *Inter County team apps and scores correct as of 15:32, 18 February 2014.

John Connolly (born 14 June 1948) is an Irish retired hurler who played as a full-forward for the Galway senior team.

Born in Leitir Móir, County Galway, Connolly first played competitive hurling whilst at school in St. Mary's College, Galway. He arrived on the inter-county scene at the age of seventeen when he first linked up with the Galway minor team, before later joining the under-21 side. He made his senior debut in the 1967 championship. Connolly went on to play a key role for Galway for more than a decade, and won one All-Ireland medal and one National Hurling League medal. He was an All-Ireland runner-up on three occasions.

As a member of the Connacht inter-provincial team at various times, Connolly won one Railway Cup medal in 1980. At club level he is a one-time All-Ireland medallist with Castlegar. In addition to this he also won four Connacht medals and six championship medals.

Throughout his career Connolly made 26 championship appearances for Galway. His retirement came following the conclusion of the 1981 championship.

Connolly is widely regarded as one of Galway's greatest-ever hurlers. He has often been voted onto teams made up of the sport's greats, including at left full-forward on the Galway Hurling Team of the Millennium.

As the eldest of the Connolly dynasty, many of his brothers, Pádraic, Joe, Michael, Tom, Gerry and Murt, played with distinction for Castlegar and Galway.

In retirement from playing, Connolly became involved in team management and coaching. He has served as a coach and selector with the Galway senior team, while at club level he also served as manager of the Castlegar senior team.

== Playing career ==
=== Club ===
Connolly first enjoyed success with Castlegar in the underage grades. He won a minor championship medal in 1965, before later adding an under-21 championship medal to his collection two years later.

In 1967 Connolly was a key member of the Castlegar senior team that reached the final of the county championship. A narrow 3–9 to 4–4 defeat of Padraig Pearse's/Oran-Maree gave him a Galway Senior Hurling Championship medal.

Castlegar surrendered their championship crown in 1968, however, the team qualified for the decider again in 1969. A massive 4–14 to 2–6 defeat of Ardrahan gave Connolly a second championship medal.

After a few years out of the spotlight, Castlegar bounced back in 1972. Turloughmore were the opponents in the county decider, however, a 5–5 to 0–8 victory allowed Connolly to add a third championship medal to his collection. Castlegar subsequently contested the provincial club championship for the first time. A massive 7–12 to 2–7 trouncing of Tremane gave Connolly a first Connacht medal.

Castlegar dominated the county championship once again in 1973, however, the decider against Ballinasloe ended in a draw. The replay was also a close affair, however, Connolly picked up a fourth championship medal following a 4–11 to 3–10 victory. Both Castlegar and Tremane contested the subsequent provincial decider for the second year in succession, with Connolly picking up a second Connacht medal following a 7–8 to 1–7 victory.

Three-in-a-row proved beyond Castlegar, and it would be 1979 before the team reached the championship final again. First-time finalists Kinvara faced an uphill battle against roll of honour leaders Castlegar. A 2–13 to 0–6 victory gave Connolly his fifth championship medal. Old rivals Tremane provided the opposition in the subsequent provincial decider, however, a 4–12 to 0–5 victory gave Connolly a third Connacht medal. Castlegar later became the first team from Connacht to qualify for the All-Ireland decider. Antrim and Ulster champions Ballycastle provided the opposition, as Connolly and his four brothers faced six Donnelly brothers on the opposing team. Olcan McLaverty scored a goal in the first half, however, this failed to ignite the Ballycastle attack. Five minutes into the second half Liam Mulryan turned a Joe Connolly pass into the net to take the lead. Ballycastle cut this lead to just a point, however, two points from brothers Gerry and Joe Connolly set up a 1–11 to 1–8 victory and an All-Ireland Senior Club Hurling Championship medal for Connolly.

After losing back-to-back championship decider in 1982 and 1983, Castlegar were under pressure to deliver in 1984. A 3–10 to 0–11 victory gave Connolly his sixth championship medal. Tooreen fell by 2–15 to 2–7 in the subsequent provincial final, giving Connolly a fourth Connacht medal. Castlegar later faced St. Martin's of Kilkenny in the All-Ireland decider. Tom Moran scored two goals which seemed to put St. Martin's in the driving seat, however, a goal by Kilkenny man Martin O'Shea for Castlegar secured a draw. The replay saw Tom Moran take centre stage once again, as St. Martin's secured a 1–13 to 1–10 victory.

=== Inter-county ===
Connolly first came to prominence on the inter-county scene with the Galway minor and under-21 teams during their ill-fated tenure in the respective Munster championships. He made his senior championship debut on 9 July 1967 in a 4–12 to 1–11 Munster semi-final defeat by Clare.

In 1971 Connolly was honoured when he was named as midfield partner to Kilkenny's Frank Cummins on the inaugural All-Star team. He was Galway's first recipient of the award.

Galway made a long-awaited breakthrough at national level in 1975. A 4–9 to 4–6 defeat of Tipperary gave Connolly, who was captain of the team, a National Hurling League medal. Galway later qualified for an All-Ireland final meeting with reigning champions Kilkenny, their first appearance in the championship decider in seventeen years and the very first seventy-minute final. Playing with the wind in the first half, Galway found themselves 0–9 to 1–3 down at the interval having played poorly. Early in the second half Kilkenny scored an early 1–3 to put this game to bed, and although Galway did reply with 1–1 and were only four points behind with twenty-five minutes left on the clock, there was never any doubt in this match. Galway were eventually defeated by 2–22 to 2–10.

After three years of penultimate stage defeats, Galway shocked four-in-a-row hopefuls Cork in the All-Ireland semi-final and qualified for an All-Ireland final showdown with Kilkenny in 1979. In one of the worst All-Ireland finals of the decade, Galway goalkeeper Séamus Shinnors had an absolute nightmare of a game. A 70-yards free by Liam "Chunky" O'Brien after just four minutes dipped, hit off Shinnors and ended up in the Galway net. Galway fought back and went two points up twelve minutes into the second half, however, they failed to score for the rest of the game. Four minutes before the end of the game another long-range free for Kilkenny ended up in the net behind Shinnors. It was a score which summed up the day for Connolly's side as Kilkenny went on to win by 2–12 to 1–8. In spite of this defeat Connolly later collected a second All-Star award.

In 1980 Galway defeated Kildare and Offaly to reach a second consecutive All-Ireland final. Munster champions Limerick provided the opposition on this occasion and an exciting championship decider followed. Bernie Forde and P. J. Molloy goals for Galway meant that the men from the west led by 2–7 to 1–5 at half-time. Éamonn Cregan single-handedly launched the Limerick counter-attack in the second-half. Over the course of the game he scored 2–7, including an overhead goal and a point in which he showed the ball to full-back Conor Hayes and nonchalantly drove the ball over the bar. It was not enough to stem the tide and Galway went on to win the game by 2–15 to 3–9. It was Galway's first All-Ireland title since 1923, with Connolly picking up a winners' medal and the celebrations surpassed anything ever seen in Croke Park.

1981 saw Galway reach a third consecutive All-Ireland final and Offaly were the opponents. Everything seemed to be going well for Connolly's side as Galway hoped to capture a second consecutive All-Ireland title. Offaly 'keeper Damien Martin was doing great work in batting out an almost certain Galway goal early in the second-half. With twenty-three minutes left in the game Galway led by six points, however, they failed to score for the rest of the game. Johnny Flaherty hand-passed Offaly's second goal with just three minutes remaining. At the long whistle Galway were defeated by 2–12 to 0–15. This defeat brought the curtain down on Connolly's inter-county career.

=== Inter-provincial ===
Connolly also lined out with Connacht in the inter-provincial series of games and enjoyed much success.

In 1979 Connolly was at midfield as Connacht reached the inter-provincial decider. A 1–13 to 1–9 defeat by Leinster was the result on that occasion. Connolly retained the same position on the team in 1980 as Connacht faced Railway Cup specialists Munster in the decider. A low-scoring game followed, however, a 1–5 to 0–7 victory gave Connacht their first Railway Cup title since 1947. It was Connolly's sole winners' medal in the inter-pro competition.

== Managerial career ==
=== Galway ===
On 11 October 2000, Noel Lane defeated incumbent Mattie Murphy by 33 votes to 21 to become manager of the Galway senior hurling team. Connolly was included on the management team as coach.

In his opening season as coach and selector, Connolly's team surrendered their National League crown, however, a shock All-Ireland semi-final defeat of reigning champions Kilkenny propelled Galway to a championship showdown with old rivals Tipperary. Galway put it up to Tipp, however, two goals by Mark O'Leary gave the Munster men the threshold to withstand a Galway comeback. With nine minutes to go Galway were only a point in arrears, however, Tipperary outscored Galway by five to three in those closing minutes. At the final whistle Tipperary were the winners by 2–18 to 2–15.

Connolly stepped down from the management team on 5 April 2002, citing his ever-increasing business commitments as the reason.

=== Castlegar ===
Connolly has also served as manager of the Castlegar senior and minor hurling teams at various times.

== Personal life ==
Born in Leitir Móir, County Galway, Connolly's family moved to Castlegar on the outskirts of Galway while he was still a young boy. He was educated at St. Mary's College in the city and quickly earned a reputation as an all-round sportsperson. He played competitive hurling and Gaelic football as well as participating in boxing, in which he was crowned Connacht junior champion at light-welterweight in 1965.

Connolly later worked as a builder and building contractor.

== Honours ==
=== Player ===
Castlegar

- All-Ireland Senior Club Hurling Championship (1): 1980
- Connacht Senior Club Hurling Championship (4): 1972, 1973, 1979, 1984
- Galway Senior Club Hurling Championship (6): 1967, 1969, 1972, 1973, 1979, 1984
- Galway Under-21 Club Hurling Championship (1): 1967
- Galway Minor Club Hurling Championship (1): 1965

Galway

- All-Ireland Senior Hurling Championship (1): 1980
- National Hurling League (1): 1974–75 (c)

Connacht

- Railway Cup (1): 1980

=== Individual ===
Awards

- All-Star (2): 1971, 1979

Sporting positions
Preceded by	Galway Senior Hurling Captain; 1975	Succeeded by
