= McKeegan =

McKeegan is an Irish surname. Notable people with the surname include:

- Karl McKeegan (born 1978), Northern Irish hurler
- Leonard McKeegan (born 1963), Irish hurler
- Michael McKeegan (born 1971), Northern Irish musician
- Tim McKeegan (1877–1939), Australian rules footballer
- Trent McKeegan (born 2000), Irish cricketer

== See also ==
- 5663 McKeegan, a main-belt asteroid
