= Ó Cillín =

Irish family

Ó Cillín is the name of an Irish family now rendered as Killeen (also Killian and Killion), found mainly in County Roscommon, County Mayo and County Galway. It is derived from the saint's name Cillian.

== Annalistic references ==
- 966: Cormac ua Cillín, of the Ui Fhiachrach of Aidne, successor of Ciarán and Comán and comarba of Tuaim Gréne — and by him was built the great church of Tuaim Gréne, and its bell-tower — a sage and an old man and a bishop, rested in Christ.
- 1026: Conall ua Cillín, successor of Crónán of Tuaim Gréine, rested.
- 1087: The battle of Conacla i.e. in Corann, won by Ruaidrí ua Conchobuir and Cormac ua Cillín, chief vice-abbot of Síl Muiredaigh, with the staff of Ciarán in his hand before the battle when it was being fought between the Connachta and the Conmaicne, and the Conmaicne were defeated, and there fell there Aed son of Art ua Ruairc, king of Conmaicne, and Muiredach ua Eolais and Sitric son of Cú Slébe ua Fergail and the son of Gafraidh ua Siridén and others. Ruaidrí ua Conchobuir was victor.
- 1106: Cormac ua Cillín, chief vice-abbot of Síl Muiredaigh and superior of the guest-house of Cluain moccu Nóis, rested in peace.
- 1186: Gillaberaigh O'Cillin, vice-abbot of Síl-Muiredhaigh, mortuus est..

== Sources ==
- https://web.archive.org/web/20120513074847/http://www.irishtimes.com/ancestor/surname/index.cfm?fuseaction=Go.&UserID=
- http://www.ucc.ie/celt/published/T100016/
