= Neal McAuley =

Irish hurler

Personal information
- Native name: Niall Mag Amhalaí (Irish)
- Born: 1987 (age 38–39) Ballycastle, County Antrim
- Height: 6 ft 0 in (183 cm)

Sport
- Sport: Hurling
- Position: Centre half back
Club
Years	Club	Apps (scores)
2006–present	Ballycastle	376
Club titles
- Antrim titles: 0
Inter-county
Years	County	Apps (scores)
2007–present	Antrim	134(2-18)
Inter-county titles
- Ulster titles: 10
- All-Irelands: 0
- NHL: 1
- All Stars: 0

Neal McAuley (born 1987) is an Irish sportsperson. He plays hurling with his local club Ballycastle and has been a member of the Antrim senior inter-county team since 2007.

McAuley is the father of three children.
