= Killeen Castle =

Killeen Castle may refer to:

- Killeen Castle, Dunsany is a castle near Dunshaughlin, County Meath, Ireland
- Killeen Castle, Castlegar is a castle in Castlegar, County Galway, Ireland
