= Terence Donnelly =

Irish former sportsman

Personal information
- Native name: Toirealach Ó Donnaile (Irish)
- Born: Ballycastle, County Antrim
- Occupation: Meat wholesaler
- Height: 6 ft 2 in (188 cm)

Sport
- Sport: Hurling
- Position: Full-back
Club
- Years: Club
- 1970s-1990s: McQuillans, Ballycastle
Club titles
- Antrim titles: 6
- Ulster titles: 6
- All-Ireland Titles: 0
Inter-county
- Years: County
- 1970s-1980s: Antrim
Inter-county titles
- Ulster titles: 1
- All-Irelands: 0
- NHL: 0
- All Stars: 0

Terence Donnelly (born 1959 in Ballycastle, County Antrim) is an Irish former sportsman. He played hurling with his local club McQuillans, Ballycastle and was a member of the Antrim senior inter-county team in the 1980s.
