= Military Move =

New Zealand-bred Thoroughbred racehorse

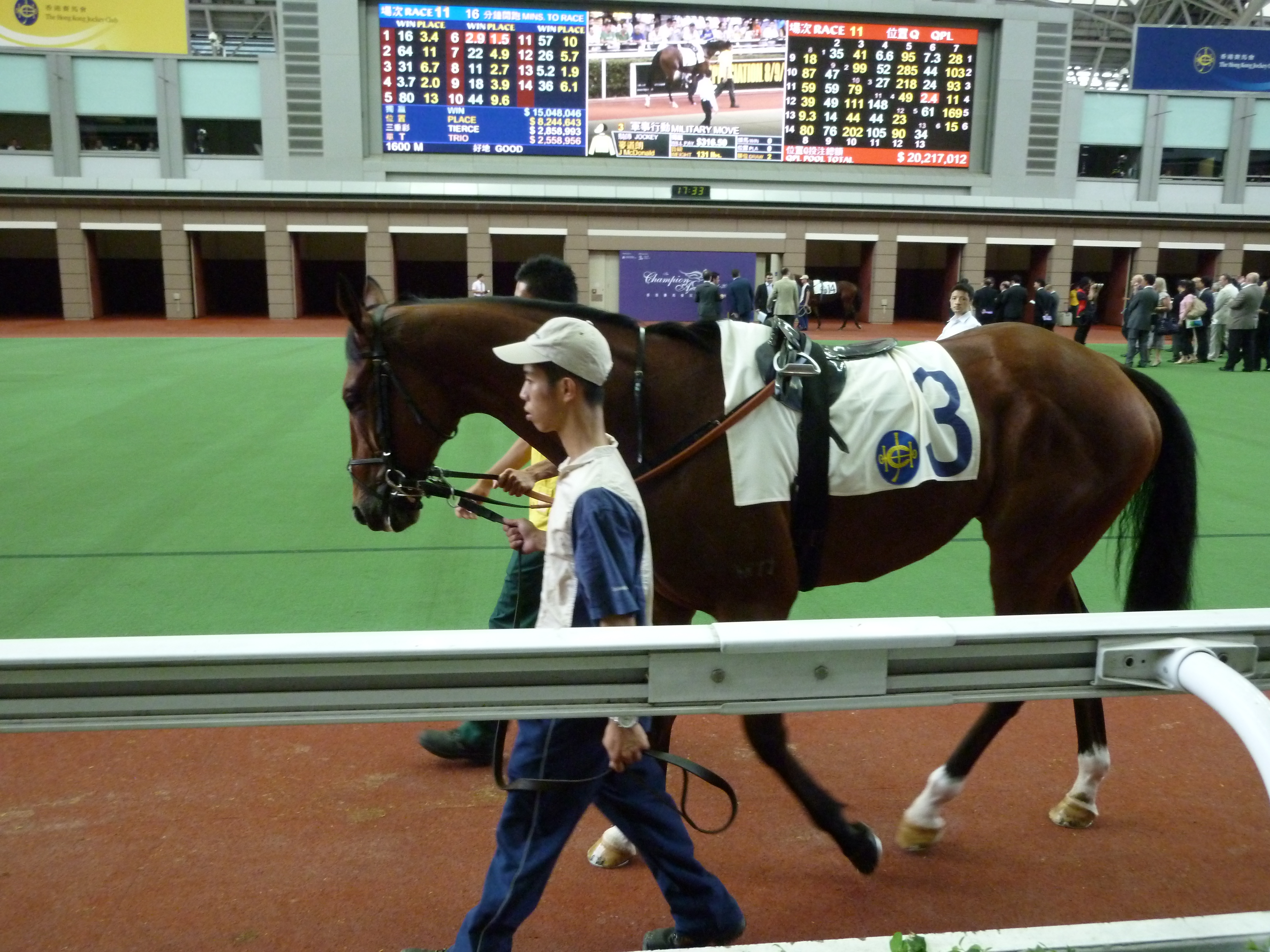
- Sire: Volksraad
- Grandsire: Green Desert
- Dam: All Night Party
- Damsire: Just A Dancer
- Sex: Gelding
- Foaled: 7 October 2006
- Country: New Zealand
- Colour: Bay
- Breeder: Windsor Park Stud
- Owner: Steven Lo
- Trainer: Shaune Ritchie; John Moore; Richard Gibson
- Record: 8:2-2-1
- Earnings: $1,502,775

Major wins
- 2010 New Zealand Derby
- Last updated on 6 March 2010

Military Move (Chinese: 軍事行動) is a New Zealand thoroughbred racehorse.

On March 6, 2010, he won the 135th running of the New Zealand Derby.

The gelding is trained by Shaune Ritchie, who was the strapper for the hugely successful and popular 1985 Derby winner Bonecrusher. Bonecrusher was trained by Ritchie's father, Frank. Bonecrusher was inducted into the New Zealand Racing Hall of Fame less than 24 hours before Military Move's Derby win.

Never further back than fifth in his eight starts as a three-year-old, seven of which were at stakes level, Military Move was the best male three-year-old in the New Zealand 2009-2010 racing season.

He made his case for that title when dashing well clear of the field early in the home straight in the New Zealand 2000 Guineas at Riccarton Park in November, ultimately holding all but the outstanding filly Katie Lee at bay.

Despite producing a highly promising Derby trial when finishing strongly from well back to finish a close fifth in the Championship Stakes, Military Move slipped under the radar and went out as a relative outsider at 15-1 in the Derby two weeks later. But aided by a magnificent ride by Michael Walker, he again opened up a big break early in the home straight and determinedly held off all challengers to record an upset victory in New Zealand's richest race.

The win in the 2010 New Zealand Derby was Military Move's last start in New Zealand before he embarked on a Hong Kong career.

== Four-year-old career ==
Military Move began his four-year-old season in a 1400m Class 2 handicap at Sha Tin in Hong Kong in December. Over a distance short of his best, Military Move dropped well back early in the running before storming home late to finish third. His second-up run resulted in a second placing over 1400m. He finished unplaced in his five subsequent starts, including a sixth placing in the Hong Kong Derby.

He returned to New Zealand after being retired in Hong Kong.

== See also ==
- Thoroughbred racing in New Zealand
