= Ryan McGarry (hurler) =

Irish hurler (born 1986)

Personal information
- Native name: Riain Mac Garraí (Irish)
- Born: 1986 (age 39–40) Ballycastle, County Antrim, Northern Ireland
- Occupation: Builder
- Height: 5 ft 10 in (178 cm)

Sport
- Sport: Hurling
- Position: Goalkeeper
Club
- Years: Club
- McQuillans, Ballycastle
Club titles
- Antrim titles: 0
Inter-county
- Years: County
- 2004–2009: Antrim
Inter-county titles
- Ulster titles: 3
- All-Irelands: 0
- NHL: 0
- All Stars: 0

Ryan McGarry (born 1986) is an Irish hurler who played as a goalkeeper for the Antrim senior team.

McGarry joined the panel during the 2004 National League and eventually became the first-choice goalkeeper until his retirement after the 2009 championship. During that time, he won one Christy Ring Cup medal as a non-playing substitute and three Ulster medals.

At club level, McGarry plays with McQuillans, Ballycastle.
