= Dessie Donnelly =

Irish hurler

Personal information
- Native name: Deasún Ó Donnaile (Irish)
- Born: Ballycastle, County Antrim
- Occupation: Architect
- Height: 5 ft 10 in (178 cm)

Sport
- Sport: Hurling
- Position: Left full-back, Corner Forward
Club
- Years: Club
- 1974-2001: McQuillan GAC Ballycastle
Club titles
- Antrim titles: 7
- Ulster titles: 6
- All-Ireland Titles: 0
Inter-county
- Years: County
- 1980-1992: Antrim
Inter-county titles
- Ulster titles: 3
- All-Irelands: 0
- NHL: 0
- All Stars: 1

Dessie Donnelly (born 1959 in Ballycastle, County Antrim) is a former Irish sportsman. He played hurling with his local club McQuillan Ballycastle and was a member of the Antrim senior inter-county team in the 1980s and 1990s.

Donnelly played in the Antrim side that reached the All-Ireland Senior Hurling Championship final in 1989, losing out to Tipperary GAA by 4-24 to 3-9 at Croke Park. Donnelly received an All-Star that year being named in corner back. He also captained the All Star team in their exhibition game against Tipperary in the SkyDome, Toronto.

== Honours ==
=== Club ===
- Antrim Senior Hurling Championship (7)
  - 1975, 1978, 1979, 1980, 1983, 1984, 1986
- Ulster Senior Club Hurling Championship (6)
  - 1978, 1979, 1980, 1983, 1984, 1986
- All-Ireland Club Senior Hurling Championship (0)
  - Runners-up 1980

=== Inter-county ===
- Ulster Senior Hurling Championship (3)
  - 1989, 1990, 1991
- All-Ireland Senior Hurling Championship (0)
  - Runners-up 1989
- All-Star (1)
  - 1989
- All-Ireland Senior B Hurling Championship (3)
  - 1978, 1981, 1982
