= George Killeen =

Irish rugby union player

- Mass card for Killeen
- Full name: George Valentine Killeen
- Born: 15 June 1884 Kilrush, County Clare, Ireland
- Died: 22 September 1933 (aged 49) County Tipperary, Ireland

Rugby union career
- Position: Forward
International career
Years	Team	Apps	(Points)
1912–14	Ireland	10	(0)

George Valentine Killeen (15 June 1884 — 22 September 1933) was an Irish international rugby union player.

Born in Kilrush, County Clare, Killeen was a forward and played for Limerick-based club Garryowen. He also played for the College of Mount Saint Joseph, while working in Roscrea. He competed for Ireland between 1912 and 1914, gaining a total of 10 caps. In 1913, he was the only player on the Irish team from Munster. Killeen was described as "a fine heavy and robust forward."

A bank official, Killeen was on duty when a Bank of Ireland branch in Tipperary was raided and fought with one of the robbers, suffering facial injuries. Killeen died in Tipperary, after a short illness.

== See also ==
- List of Ireland national rugby union players
