= James McNaughton (Ruairí Óg Cushendall hurler) =

Irish hurler

Personal information
- Native name: Séamus Mac Neachtain (Irish)
- Born: 1963 Cushendall, County Antrim, Northern Ireland
- Died: 17 February 2014 (aged 50) Cushendall, County Antrim, Northern Ireland
- Occupation: Farmer
- Height: 6 ft 0 in (183 cm)

Sport
- Sport: Hurling
- Position: Right wing-back
Club
- Years: Club
- 1980s-2000s: Ruarí Óg Cushendall
Club titles
- Antrim titles: 8
- Ulster titles: 7
Inter-county
- Years: County
- 1982-1993: Antrim
Inter-county titles
- Ulster titles: 2
- All-Irelands: 0
- NHL: 0
- All Stars: 0

James McNaughton (c. 1963 – 17 February 2014) was an Irish hurler who played as a right wing-back for the Antrim senior team.

McNaughton made his first appearance for the team during the 1982 'B' championship and became a regular player over the following decade. During that time he won two Ulster winner's medals.

At club level McNaughton was a seven-time Ulster medalist with Ruarí Óg Cushendall. In addition to this he also won eight county championship winners' medals.

He died in February 2014 at the age of 51.
