= Oliver Killeen =

Fraudster and bigamist (born 1937)

Oliver Killeen (born 13 June 1937 in Castlebar, Ireland) is an Irish and Canadian fraudster and serial bigamist who was married at least 14 times.

He emigrated from Ireland to Canada with his first wife, Mary, with whom he had eight children. She died in Canada in 1974, aged 38. Later that same year, he was briefly married to Agnes Cloney. That marriage was never legally dissolved. He pretended to be a doctor of psychology in Waterford, Ireland for five years in the late 1990s, claiming to be a highly trained psychotherapist with university credentials from the United States and Canada. He became a well-known media personality in Ireland with radio, television and newspaper coverage, including authoring a syndicated column in 35 publications. He is believed to have been married between 13 and 19 times after becoming a widower in 1974. It is unclear if divorce was sought or received in any of those marriages. Killeen was convicted of bigamy in the UK in 2004, serving one and a half years of a three-year sentence. He became the subject of a 2006 TV film, The Conman With 14 Wives. Between 1971 and 1977 alone, Killeen had also accumulated 54 convictions for false pretenses, often involving bounced checks.

Barbara Daniels, one of Killeen's later wives, a Canadian citizen, filed a bigamy charge against him in Superior Court in Ontario and claimed he had been physically abusive which he acknowledged. They married in 1978 and she left him in 1985 but learned she could not divorce him as he was still married to his previous wife. Daniels' daughter, Julia Lafleur, was active on social media and, after learning he had returned to Toronto, gathered evidence to convince the Canadian authorities to prosecute him. On 1 March 2012, Killeen pleaded guilty to the charge, and was sentenced to 90-days in jail (to be served on weekends). The prosecutor said the defendant's age, his guilty plea, and the fact he is working were mitigating factors to be considered in sentencing.

In 2006, Agnieszka Piotrowska directed a documentary about Killeen for Channel Five titled Conman With 14 Wives (also broadcast as Trust Me I am a Conman in some areas) which led to a discovery of Killeen's subsequent bigamous marriage. A Canadian documentary series was made titled The Devil You Know, created by Vancouver-based production company Make Believe Media. One of the episodes tells of Daniels' story of her marriage to Killeen and her daughter's legal battle to bring him to justice in Canada. It aired in Canada on Viva and elsewhere on the Oprah Winfrey Network.
