= Theo Killion =

American businessman

- Born: Theophlius Killion
- Occupation: Businessman
- Known for: CEO of Zale Corporation

Theophlius Killion is an American businessman who was CEO of Zale Corporation from February 2010 to July 2014. He also was director of Jewelers of America, initially as interim CEO and a member of the board of directors of Express, Inc. His tenure led the failing Zale Corporation back from near-bankruptcy.

== Education ==
He was educated at The Hill School and graduated cum laude from Tufts University with a bachelor's degree in history and English and M.Ed from Tufts University in 1975.

== Career ==
Previously, Killion worked at Tommy Hilfiger (company) as executive vice president of human resources and executive recruiter at executive search firm Berglass+Associates. He held the post of the vice president of human resources of The Limited Brands from January 1996 to March 2004, and was its corporate vice president of HR for merchandising and design.

Killion was the chief executive officer of Zale Corporation at Piercing Pagoda Inc. from 23 September 2010 to 2014. He held different positions during his time at Zale Corporation. In particular he was an executive vice president of human resources, legal and corporate strategy for Zale Corporation from January 2008 to August 2008. He also was a president of Zale Corporation from August 5, 2008 to September 23, 2010 and interim chief executive officer from January 13, 2010 to September 23, 2010. Killion occupied the position of the chief executive officer of Zale Division and president of Zale Division at Signet Jewelers Limited from May 29, 2014 to July 31, 2014.

He has been pppManaging pppPartner of The Sierra Institute since November 2016. Killion was vice chairman of Herbert Mines Associates, Inc. since May 2015 until March 2016. He was an Independent Director at Libbey Inc. since May 2014 until May 17, 2017.

Killion assumed the role of director at Tailored Brands since June 15, 2017. By March 2019, he had been named chairman of the Tailored Brands board.

== Awards ==
In 2012, he accepted the M.B. Zale Visionary Merchant Award from Texas A&M University. He received the 2013 Dreambuilder Award from BlackGivesBack
