= Killeen Castle, Castlegar =

Tower house in County Galway, Ireland

Coordinates: 53.3128°N 8.9787°W

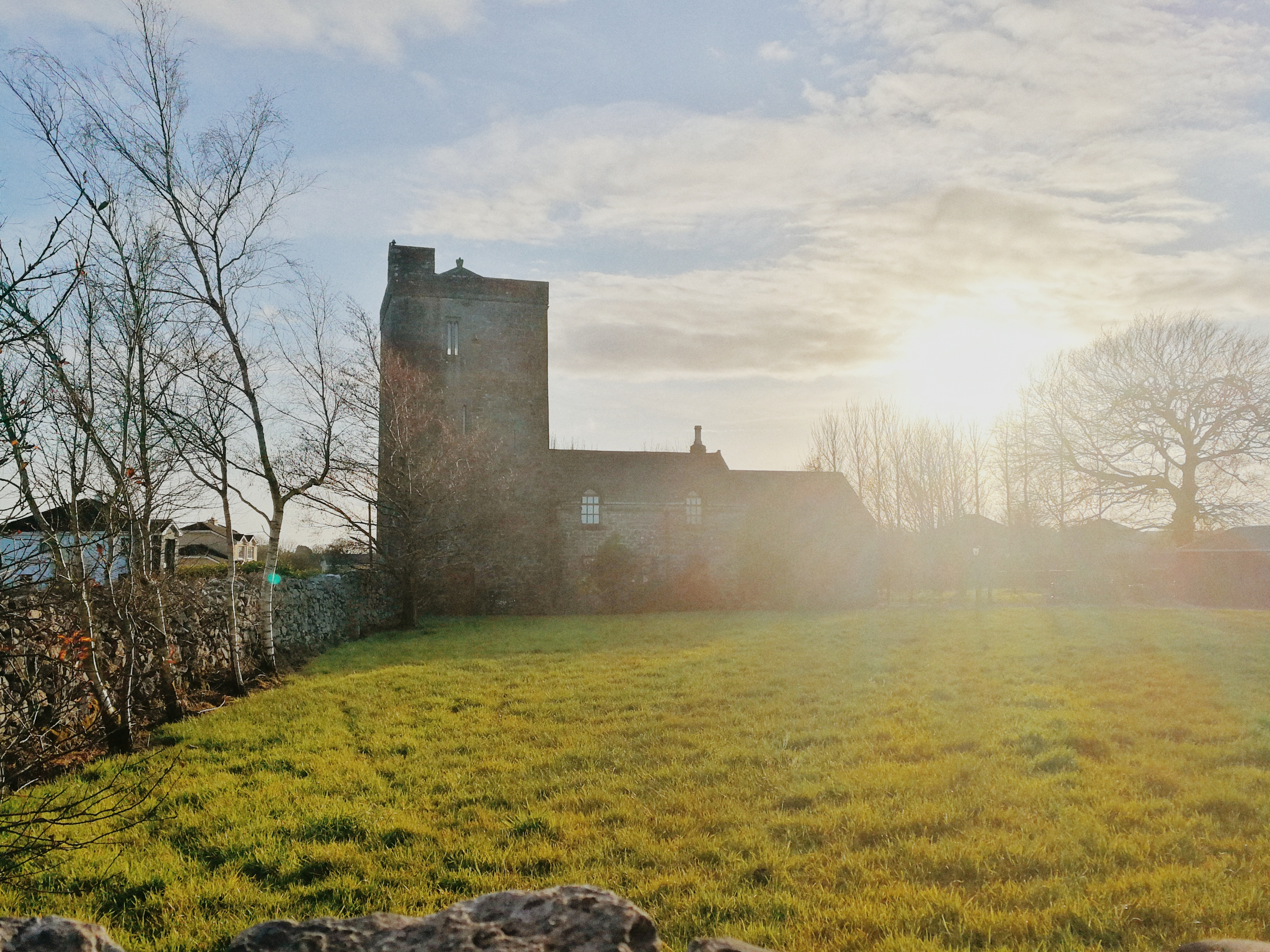
Killeen Castle

Killeen Castle (Irish: Caisleán a' Chillín) is a 15th-century tower house in Killeen townland, near Castlegar, County Galway, on the western coast of Ireland.

Originally built in 1493, the tower house and surrounding estate is historically associated with Blake family, one of the 14 tribes of Galway. A farmhouse was constructed abutting the western wall of the tower house during the 19th century, A large house was constructed on a hill to the north of the tower house, and with a gatehouse built on the N17 road. This large house (Killeen House) was burned down in 1922, together with many similar country houses of landed families, and subsequently demolished. The land and castle was later purchased by a farmer from Tuam who had been managing the estate. The castle was sold and passed through several owners in the late 20th century, being extended and converted into a private residence.
