= Castlegar, County Galway =

Village in County Galway, Ireland

Castlegar An Caisleán Gearr
- Village
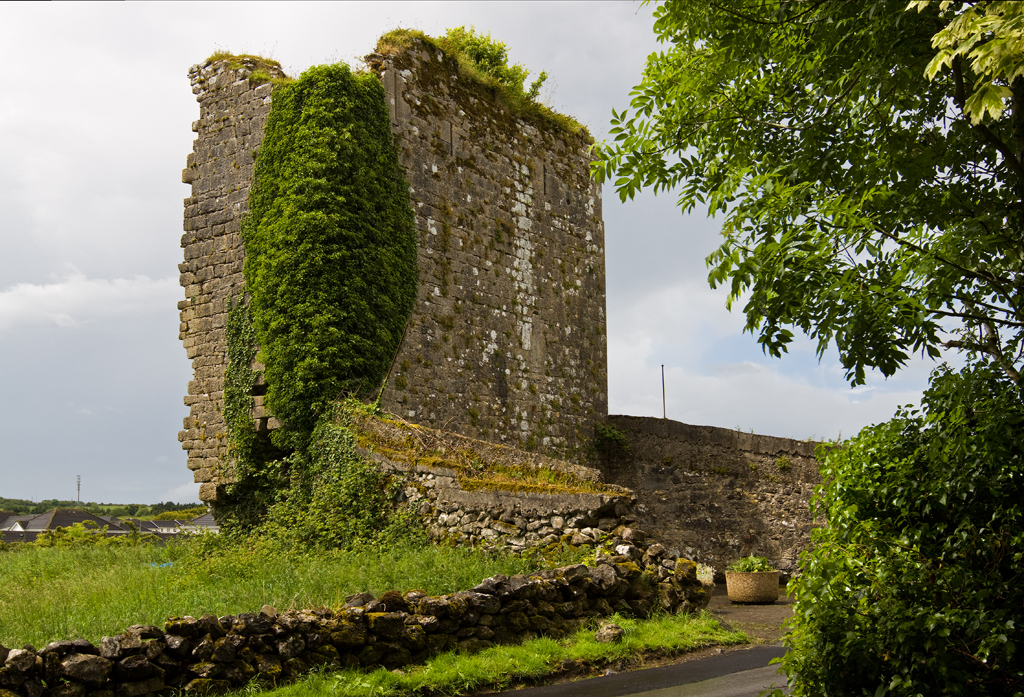
- Ruined tower house (An Caisleán Gearr) at Castlegar

- Location in Ireland
- Coordinates: 53°18′00″N 9°01′07″W
- Country: Ireland
- Province: Connacht
- County: County Galway
- Time zone: UTC+0 (WET)
  - Summer (DST): UTC-1 (IST (WEST))

Castlegar (Irish: An Caisleán Gearr, meaning 'short castle') is a village and electoral division in County Galway, just outside the city of Galway, in Ireland. Castlegar is also an ecclesiastical parish in the Roman Catholic Diocese of Galway, Kilmacduagh and Kilfenora. It extends from Lough Corrib across to Merlin Park by the old Galway-Dublin road.

The eponymous Castlegar Castle, a 15th or 16th century tower house, is historically associated with the Burke (de Burgo) family. Castlegar GAA club is based in the area.

== History ==
The name Castlegar is derived from the Irish Caisleán Gearr, meaning "short castle". The small Castlegar Castle, in the middle of the parish, was built by Richard Burke, 4th Earl of Clanricarde (1572–1635) of Portumna Castle. The castle at Castlegar was a four-storey tower house, now in ruin, which was used as a "guest" castle for the Blake family's Menlo Castle.

== Irish language ==
As of 2006, the electoral division of Castlegar (Castlegar ED) had a population of over 1,000 people, of whom 11% spoke Irish daily.

== Castles ==
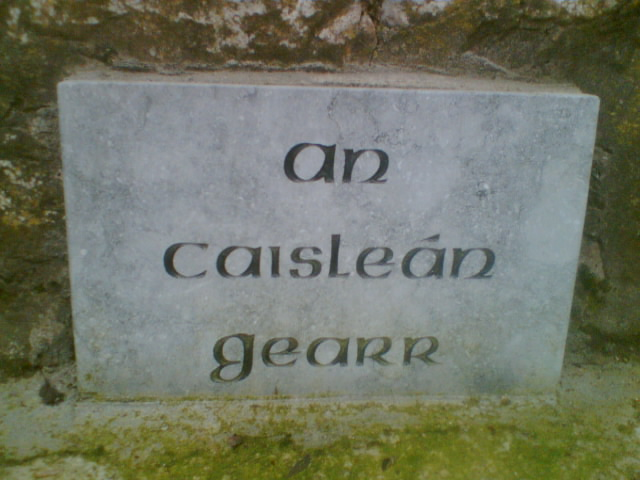
Plaque at Castlegar Castle

Castles in the area include:

- Ballybrit Castle
- Ballindooley Castle (Ballindooly)
- Castlegar Castle (Castle Gar; An Caisleán Gearr)
- Cloonacauneen Castle (Cluanacauneen)
- Killeen Castle (Killeen)
- Menlo Castle (Menlough)
- Merlin Park Castle (formerly Doughiska/Doughiskey)

== Villages and townlands ==
Villages and townlands in the ecclesiastical parish of Castlegar include:

- Ballybrit (home to Ballybrit Racecourse and the Galway Races)
- Ballindooley
- Ballintemple
- Briarhill
- Bruckey
- Cappanabornia
- Carrabrowne
- Castlegar townland
- Coolough
- Killeen
- Killtulla
- Kyloughter
- Menlo
- Two-Mile-Ditch

== Notable people ==
- Blake baronets, were local landowners from 1622 through 1910
- John Connolly and Joe Connolly, hurlers and brothers from the Connolly family, are from Castlegar
