= Leonard McKeegan =

Irish hurler

Personal information
- Native name: Lionard Mac Aogáin (Irish)
- Born: 1963 (age 62–63) Cushendall, County Antrim, Northern Ireland
- Height: 5 ft 9 in (175 cm)

Sport
- Sport: Hurling
- Position: Midfield
Club
- Years: Club
- Ruarí Óg
Inter-county
- Years: County
- 1985-1992: Antrim
Inter-county titles
- Ulster titles: 0
- All-Irelands: 0
- NHL: 0
- All Stars: 0

Leonard McKeegan (born 1963) is an Irish former hurler who played as a midfielder for the Antrim senior team.

McKeegan made his first appearance for the team during the 1985-86 National League and was a semi-regular member of the starting fifteen for much of the next decade. During that time he played in Antrim's historic 1989 All-Ireland final defeat by Tipperary, but enjoyed little other success on the field of play.

At club level McKeegan enjoyed a lengthy and successful career with the Ruarí Óg Cushendall club.
