= Brian Donnelly (hurler) =

Irish hurler

Personal information
- Native name: Briain Ó Donnaile (Irish)
- Born: 1961 (age 64–65) Ballycastle, County Antrim
- Occupation: Bank official
- Height: 6 ft 0 in (183 cm)

Sport
- Sport: Hurling
- Position: Right wing-forward
Club
- Years: Club
- 1970s-1990s: McQuillans, Ballycastle
Club titles
- Antrim titles: 6
- Ulster titles: 6
Inter-county
Years	County	Apps (scores)
1978-1991	Antrim	16 (8-25)
Inter-county titles
- Ulster titles: 2
- All-Irelands: 0
- NHL: 0
- All Stars: 0

Brian Donnelly (born 1961) was a Northern Irish hurler who played as a full-forward for the Antrim senior team.

Donnelly made his first appearance for the team during the 1978-79 National League and was a regular member of the starting fifteen for over a decade. During that time he won two All-Ireland "B" medals and two Ulster medals.

At club level Donnelly enjoyed a lengthy career with the McQuillans, Ballycastle club.
