= New Zealand 1000 Guineas =

- Class: Group I
- Location: Riccarton Park; Christchurch, New Zealand
- Inaugurated: 1973
- Race type: Thoroughbred - Flat racing
- Website: Riccarton Park

Race information
- Distance: 1600 metres (1 mile)
- Surface: Turf
- Track: Left-handed
- Qualification: Three-year-old fillies
- Weight: Set-Weights
- Purse: NZ$600,000 (2026)

The New Zealand 1000 Guineas is a Group One set-weights Thoroughbred horse race for three-year-old fillies run over a distance of 1600 metres (1 mile) at Riccarton Park in Christchurch, New Zealand.

== Christchurch New Zealand Cup week ==
In previous years the New Zealand 1000 Guineas was held on the final Saturday of Christchurch's famous Christchurch "Cup Week" held along with the New Zealand Cup. However, from 2025 it was swapped with the New Zealand 2000 Guineas and moved to the first Saturday, four days after the Melbourne Cup.

For thoroughbred horses the week features:

- the New Zealand 2000 Guineas, as stated above, previously held on the first Saturday but moved to the second Saturday as from 2025
- the TAB Mile (formerly the Coupland's Bakeries Mile) on the Wednesday
- the New Zealand Cup on the final Saturday
- the Stewards Handicap sprint on the final Saturday.

Christchurch Cup week includes premier standardbred meetings at Addington raceway including:

- the New Zealand Trotting Cup for pacers on the Tuesday
- the Dominion Handicap for trotters which was previously held on the Friday, but moved to the Tuesday from 2024
- the New Zealand Free For All for pacers on the Friday.

Up until 2025 there was also greyhound racing on the Thursday, including the following Group 1 races:

- the New Zealand Galaxy - C5f 295m ($40,000 stake)
- the New Zealand Greyhound Cup - C5f 525m ($100,000)
- the New Zealand Stayers Cup - C2df 732m ($40,000)

Greyhound racing was banned by the New Zealand Government with effect from 1 August 2026.

The week also features the Canterbury A&P Show

== History ==
Until 1973, both the New Zealand Oaks and the New Zealand Derby were run at Riccarton. When those races were moved to Trentham and Ellerslie respectively, Riccarton was awarded two new classic races, the 1000 and 2000 Guineas over 1600 metres (1 mile). These races are based on those of the same name in the United Kingdom, run at Newmarket in the first weekend in May.

Both races have quickly established themselves on the New Zealand calendar, and the 1000 Guineas routinely attracts all of the country's leading fillies and, as a crucial race in the Filly Of The Year series, is regularly taken out by the eventual winner of that title.

The 1000 Guineas has been run for a total stake of:

- 1975 - $20,000
- 1986 - $100,000
- 1994 - $100,000
- 2003 - $275,000
- 2007 - $325,000
- 2014 - $400,000
- 2019 - $300,000
- 2024 - $550,000

=== Notable winners ===
Among the best winners of the 1000 Guineas are:

- Katie Lee, winner of the 2009 New Zealand 2000 Guineas.
- King's Rose (2010): winner of the 2010 Eulogy Stakes, 2011 NZB Royal Stakes, Sir Tristram Fillies Classic, Memsie Stakes and W H Stocks Stakes
- Legarto (2022): winner of the 2023 Australian Guineas, 2024 & 2025 Herbie Dyke Stakes and 2026 Bonecrusher New Zealand Stakes
- Seachange
- Taatletail
- Tycoon Lil (1997), winner of the 1998 Cambridge Stud Sir Tristram Fillies Classic, New Zealand Oaks and Canterbury Guineas, runner up in the 1997 New Zealand 2000 Guineas and Rosehill Guineas and 3rd to Might and Power in the 1998 Cox Plate.

== Recent results ==
| Year | Winner | Jockey | Trainer(s) | Owner(s) | Time | Second | Third |
|---|---|---|---|---|---|---|---|
| 2026 | Angels Halo | Masa Hashizume | Hollie Elliot | M J & S L Hardy, C Hardy, K Hardy, A Collings & L Collings, R Tangye & B Tangye | 1:35.47 (good) | Dashing Dixie | Asturia |
| 2025 | Well Written | Matt Cartwright | Stephen Marsh | Yulong Investment NZ Ltd, 8 Mates Syndicate, et al | 1:35.09 (soft) | Lollapalooza | Belle Cheval |
| 2024 | Captured By Love | Joshua Parr | Mark Walker & Sam Bergerson | Te Akau 2023 Magic Fillies' Breeding Syndicate | 1.38.93 (soft) | Alabama Lass | Movin Out |
| 2023 | Molly Bloom | Joe Doyle | Lance O'Sullivan & Andrew Scott | B Anderson, A R & C J Marshall, Forest Partnership, I Whitley, B Kwok, D Lye, K & L Morey, Kypu Syndicate, James Group Syndicate, B & D Verryt | 1:35.76 (good) | Impendabelle | Tulsi |
| 2022 | Legarto | Ryan Elliot | Ken and Bev Kelso | C J Brown & P H Brown et al. | 1:37.67 (soft) | Best Seller | Blue Solitaire |
| 2021 | The Perfect Pink | Opie Bosson | Jamie Richards, Matamata | A G, K J, M C & P R Dennis, G C Bennett, S P Christopher, C Lawrence & T V Rider | 1:38.21 (soft) | Shepherd's Delight | Belle En Rouge |
| 2020 | Kahma Lass | Opie Bosson | Jamie Richards, Matamata | Brendan Lindsay MNZM & Mrs Jo Lindsay | 1:36.71 (soft) | Miss Tycoon Rose | Cornflower Blue |
| 2019 | Loire | Michael McNab | Tony Pike, Cambridge | Brent & Cherry Taylor & Kate Plaw | 1:36.33 (good) | Jennifer Eccles | Travelling Light |
| 2018 | Media Sensation | Michael Coleman | Peter & Dawn Williams, Byerley Park | Barneswood Farm Ltd (Sarah Green & Ger Beemsterboer) | 1:36.43 (good) | Valalie | Xpression |
| 2017 | Hasahalo | Sam Spratt | Stephen McKee, Ardmore | Go Racing Fright Night Breeding Partnership (Mgr Albert Bosma) | 1:35.63 (good) | Dijon Bleu | The Lustre |
| 2016 | La Diosa | Racha Cuneen | Mandy & Matt Brown | Calder Bloodstock Ltd, G L Currie, Bruce Honeybone & Deborah Martin, M L Gibson, P B C Sipos & T W Archer Trust | 1:37.85 (good) | Bella Gioia | Sweepstake |
| 2015 | Risque | Matthew Cameron | Stephen Autridge & Jamie Richards, Matamata | The Oaks Stud | 1:35.96 (good) | Strada Cavallo | Dezzies Dream |
| 2014 | Platinum Witness | Darryl Bradley | Lisa Latta, Awapuni | Lincoln Farms & N J McAlister | 1:36.32 (good) | Darci's Dream | Belle Miraaj |
| 2013 | Costa Viva | Leith Innes | Jason Bridgman, Matamata | Te Akau Racing | 1:35.42 (good) | Bounding | Spellbinder |
| 2012 | Rollout The Carpet | Mark Du Plessis | Jeff McVean & Emma Browne, Cambridge | J H, J R Cameron et al. | 1:37.90 (good) | Waterford | Fix |
| 2011 | Planet Rock | Hayden Tinsley | Dawn & Peter Williams, Byerley Park | Barneswood Farm (Sarah Green & Ger Beemsterboer) | 1:40.09 (soft) | Abeautifulred | Capital Diamond |
| 2010 | King's Rose | Opie Bosson | Jason Bridgman, Matamata | G W Tsoi | 1.35.57 (good) | Twilight Savings | Smoulter |
| 2009 | Katie Lee | Opie Bosson | Graeme & Debbie Rogerson | Sir Patrick & Lady Hogan | 1:37.88 (good) | Keep The Peace | Our Ella Belle |
| 2008 | Daffodil | Hayden Tinsley | Kevin Gray, Copper Belt Lodge | G J & M J Chittick | 1:34.39 (good) | Juice | Awesome Planet |
| 2007 | Insouciant | Michael Walker | Mark Walker, Matamata | Peter Vela & Philip M Vela | 1:36.99 (good) | Keepa Cruisin | Lovetrista |
| 2006 | Dorabella | Jamie Bullard | Howie & Lorraine Mathews, Otaki | Mrs NF & PE Izzett | 1:34.54 (good) | Princess Coup | Velvet And Satin |
| 2005 | Seachange | Gavin McKeon | Ralph Manning, Cambridge | Karreman Bloodstock Ltd. | 1:35.13 (good) | Everswindell | Tsarina Belle |
| 2004 | Justa Tad | Vinny Colgan | Rudy Liefting, Pukekohe | RP Liefting | 1:35.29 (good) | La Sizeranne | Julinsky Princess |
| 2003 | Taatletail | Michael Walker | Graeme Rogerson | B J Foster, P C Glover, S R Just, D McLuckie, P L Meo & G Rogerson | 1:37.64 (firm) | Kainui Belle | Unearthed |
| 2002 | The Jewel | Jason Laking | H & S Anderton | A G, K J, M C & P R Dennis | 1:35.69 (good) | Chestpeak | Volksini |
| 2001 | Final Destination | Gary Grylls | Wayne & Vannessa Hillis, Matamata | T Van Beurden | 1:34.16 (good) | Blackrock College | Moon Magic |
| 2000 | Elevenses | Mark Sweeney | Graeme & Debbie Sanders, Te Awamutu | Elevenses Syndicate | 1:34.85 (good) | Singalong | Flint Star |
| 1999 | Ad Alta | Leith Innes | Tony Gillies, Matamata | P A & Mrs P A Payne | 1:37.56 (soft) | Ambitious | Thee Old Dragon |
| 1998 | Pace Invader | David Walsh | Alvin Clark | P R Dickinson, A R & E J Johnson & C T Wintle | 1:34.41 (good) | Nahayan | Mi Babe |
| 1997 | Tycoon Lil | Chris Johnson | Colin Jillings & Richard Yuill, Takanini | P J Walker | 1:35.52 (good) | Alavana | Basso |
| 1996 | Emerald | Catherine Treymane | John Gudopp, Cambridge | Jim Campin | 1:38.04 (easy) | Bubble | Groundless Threats |
| 1995 | Clear Rose | Noel Harris | Laurie Laxon, Cambridge | L K Laxon, CL Leung, Peter Vela & Philip Vela | 1:34.53 (good) | Furama Nights | San Goma |
| 1994 | Tartan Tights | Chris Johnson | Ellis Winsloe, Gore | G L Robertson | 1:35.32 (firm) | Starcent | Stardette |
| 1993 | Snap | Lance O'Sullivan | Dave & Paul O'Sullivan, Matamata | Mrs L M A O'Sullivan & Lord Tavistock | 1:34.85 (firm) | Thrilling Day | Covered n' Grey |
| 1992 | Nimue | Lance O'Sullivan | Dave & Paul O'Sullivan, Matamata | R R Cheak & Windsor Park Stud Ltd | 1:36.69 (good) | Clear Cut | Rhythm |
| 1991 | Merry Maiden | David Walsh | Patrick Campbell, Awapuni | P R Beamish, H B N & Mrs P E Williams | 1:38.09 (good) | Normandy River | Colours |
| 1990 | Plume | Roy McKay | Patrick Busuttin, Foxton | P M Busuttin, Fairdale Stud Ltd, A M McRae & A C Wikeley | 1:34.10 (good) | Cool Rock'a | Morning Rise |
| 1989 | Phillipa Rush | Chris Johnson | Jim Campin, Cambridge | Jim Campin | 1:35.62 (good) | Seamist | Fiesta Rose |
| 1988 | Olga's Pal | Lance O'Sullivan | Bob & Toby Autridge | HJ Fleming | 1:36.68 (good) | Kate's Myth | Imperialaire |
| 1987 | Candide | Ross Elliot | Geoff Haigh | M & SA Joseph, Trans Media Park Stud | 1:36.81 (good) | Serestrina | Ultra Sound |
| 1986 | Cure | Grant Cooksley | Dave & Paul O'Sullivan, Matamata | E P & T R Lowry, Mrs P G Marie & Estate M A Pinckney | 1:35.12 (good) | Tidal Light | Magdelaine |
| 1985 | Imperial Angel | Jim Collett | Michael Moroney, Matamata | J S Sheffield | 1:36.40 (good) | Classic Ace | Sierra Sand |
| 1984 | Canterbury Belle | Chris Johnson | David Kerr, Riccarton | Mr & Mrs N G Wigley | 1:35.82 (fast) | Avana | Sobay |
| 1983 | Burletta | Jim Cassidy | Patrick Campbell, Hastings | R A Buchanan, T G Mulcaster, R R Randle & R C Spotswood | 1:36.2 (firm) | Eastern Bay | Silver Elm |
| 1982 | Our Flight | Maurice Campbell | Errol Skelton | J W Rusher | 1:36.72 (good) | Passakiss | Queen's Pal |
| 1981 | Noble Heights | Garry Phillips | Laurie Laxon & P M Atwood | Peter Vela & Philip Vela | 1:36.94 (firm) | Julia | Sea Princess |
| 1980 | Powley | M Casey | Hec Anderton, Wingatui | H A Anderton | 1:36.12 (firm) | Glamour Bay | Full Of Grace |
| 1979 | Orbit | David Walsh | Garth Ivil, Awapuni | W F Downe | 1:36.64 (firm) | Pays Anne | Firefly |
| 1978 | Tang | Des Harris | Charlie Cameron, Hastings | D B & E J Callaghan, R M Miller | 1:36.35 (firm) | Springtide | Tui's Lass |
| 1977 | Braless | D H Southworth | Peter Grieve | D H, I D & Peter H Grieve | 1:35.6 (firm) | Tudor Quest | Polly Porter |
| 1976 | Porsha | Noel Harris | Bill & Graeme Sanders, Te Awamutu | E M & Mrs Yule | 1:39.8 | | |
| 1975 | Entice | Garry Phillips | T L Jennings, Opaki | B R Flanders, D P & Mrs Goer, W H Walker | 1:37.8 (firm) | Mop | Kayenta |
| 1974 | Princess Patrice | Garry Phillips | M C Conway, Avondale | D A Hager, P S Wilson | 1:40 | | |
| 1973 | Prepak | Des Harris | Ray Verner, Takanini | N H Amon | 1:38 (firm) | Battle Eve | Syalbi |

=== 1000 and 2000 Guineas ===
Katie Lee is the only horse to win both of these races, having done so in 2009 ridden by Opie Bosson and trained by Graeme & Debbie Rogerson for owners Sir Patrick & Lady Hogan.

In 1997 Tycoon Lil won the 1000 Guineas and 4 days later was 2nd in the 2000 Guineas behind Foxwood.

In 2014 Platinum Witness was 4th in the 2000 Guineas behind Turn Me Loose and then a week later won the 1000 Guineas.

=== 1000 Guineas and New Zealand Oaks ===
Historically winners and placegetters in the New Zealand 1000 Guineas have performed strongly in the New Zealand Oaks, such as the following:

| Season | Horse | 1000 Guineas | NZ Oaks |
|---|---|---|---|
| 2019/20 | Jennifer Eccles | 2nd | 1st |
| 2015/16 | Strada Cavallo | 2nd | 3rd |
| 2014/15 | Platinum Witness | 1st | 2nd |
| 2009/10 | Keep The Peace | 2nd | 1st |
| 2006/07 | Princess Coup | 2nd | 1st |
| 2002/03 | The Jewell | 1st | 2nd |
| 2000/01 | Singalong | 2nd | 2nd |
| 1997/98 | Tycoon Lil | 1st | 1st |
| 1995/96 | San Goma | 3rd | 3rd |
| 1994/95 | Tartan Tights | 1st | 1st |
| 1993/94 | Snap | 1st | 1st |
| 1990/91 | Plume | 1st | 2nd |
| 1988/89 | Kate's Myth | 2nd | 2nd |

== See also ==
- Recent winners of major races for 3-year-old horses
- Desert Gold Stakes
- Hawke's Bay Guineas
- New Zealand Oaks
- Levin Classic
- New Zealand Derby
- Karaka Million
