= Ruth Ann Killion =

American statistician

Ruth Ann Killion (1949–2021) was an American government statistician who worked for the United States Census Bureau.

== Education and career ==
Killion was born on November 2, 1949, in Springfield, Illinois, where her father was a minister. She was educated at Florida State University, earning a master's degree in statistics there in 1973.

She worked for many years in the Census Bureau, and as executive director of the Office for Research, Planning, and Evaluation of the Evangelical Lutheran Church in America. At the Census Bureau, she served as chief of the statistical research division, of the decennial statistical studies division, of the planning, research and evaluation division, and of the demographic statistical methods division.

She retired from the Census Bureau in 2019, and died on November 23, 2021.

== Recognition ==
In 2016, Killion was elected as a Fellow of the American Statistical Association.
