= Cloonacauneen Castle =

Tower house on the outskirts of Galway, Ireland

Coordinates: 53°19′22″N 8°59′18″W

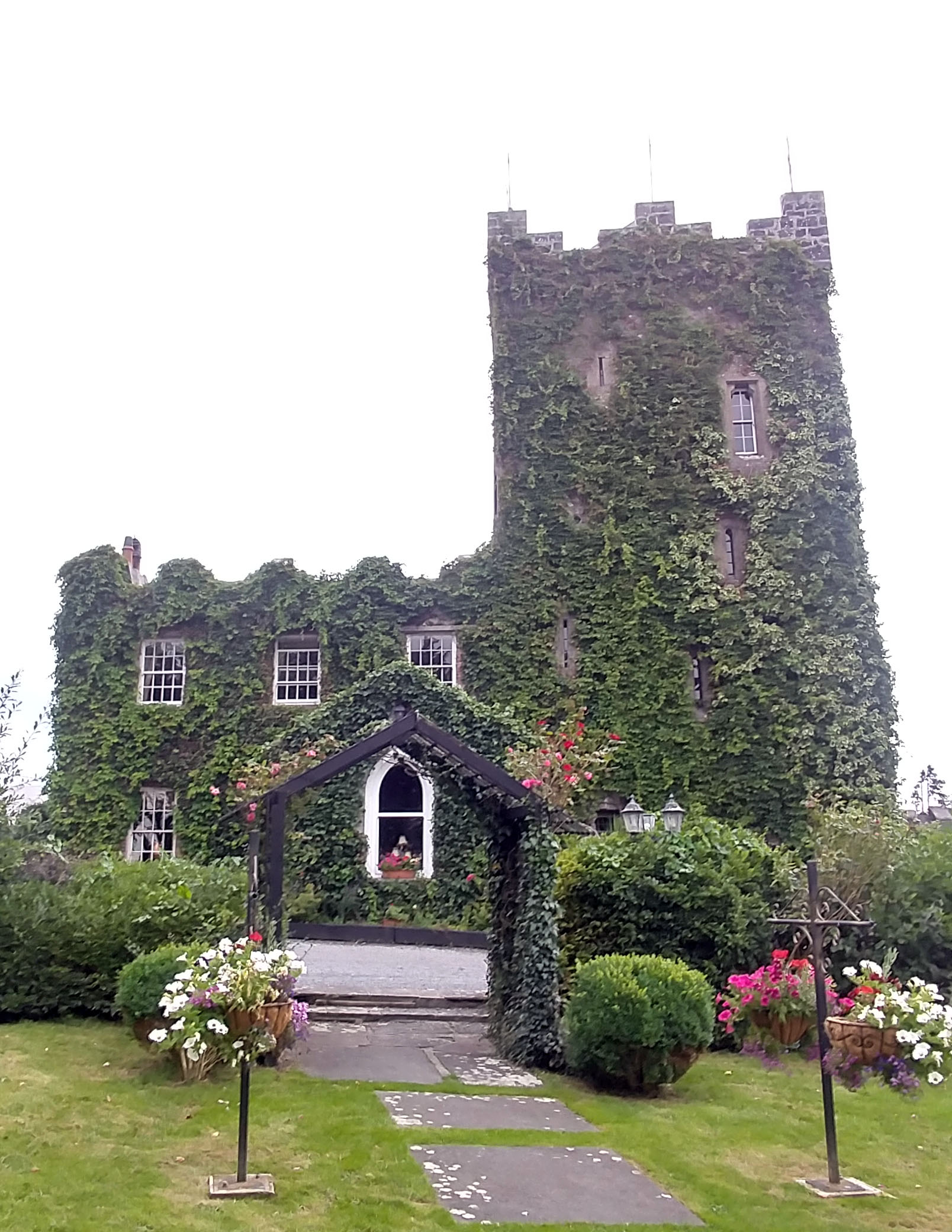

- Location within Ireland
- Type: tower house
- Location: County Galway, Ireland

History
- Built: 15th century

Site notes
- Height: 50 ft (15 m)
- Architectural style: Norman-style

Cloonacauneen Castle is a restored 15th-century tower house with an attached wing. It is privately owned, and is located in the northeast outskirts of Galway city in County Galway, Ireland.

== History ==
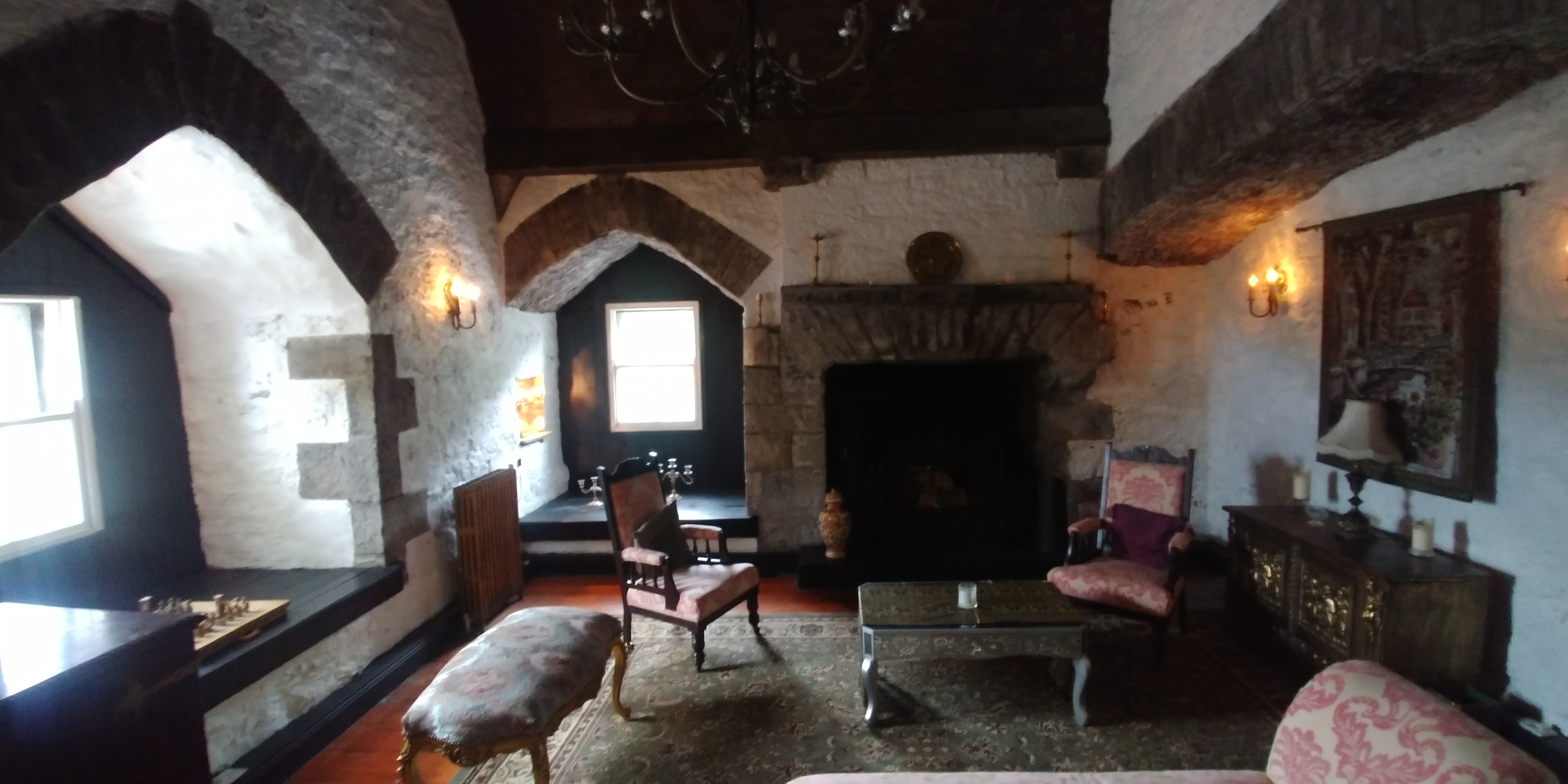
A common room inside the castle

The castle was built in the 15th century. By 1914, it had fallen into disrepair. In 1963, a restoration effort was started by the Lenihan family, which saw the roofs of the castle and guest house replaced and the battlements raised back to their original height.

The castle's owners have been recorded since as early as 1574, when it was owned by Richard Beag Burke.

== Modern usage ==
The castle now functions primarily as a restaurant, pub and hotel. It is used for events such as weddings and corporate functions.
