= Katie Lee (horse) =

New Zealand Thoroughbred racehorse

- Sire: Pins (AUS)
- Grandsire: Snippets
- Dam: Miss Jessie Jay (NZ)
- Damsire: Spectacularphantom (USA)
- Sex: Filly
- Foaled: 14 September 2006 (age 20)
- Country: New Zealand
- Colour: Grey
- Breeder: Hallmark Stud
- Owner: Sir Patrick & Lady Hogan
- Trainer: Graeme & Debbie Rogerson
- Record: 23: 8-5-3
- Earnings: NZ$1,100,675

Major wins
- New Zealand 2000 Guineas (2009); New Zealand 1000 Guineas (2009)
- Last updated on 17 August 2011

Katie Lee (foaled 14 September 2006) is a New Zealand Thoroughbred racemare who in November 2009 became the first horse in history to win both the New Zealand 2000 Guineas and the New Zealand 1000 Guineas.

Katie Lee was purchased for NZ$340,000 at the 2008 New Zealand Bloodstock National Yearling Sale at Karaka by Sir Patrick Hogan of Cambridge Stud. Speaking after her 2000 Guineas win in November 2009, Hogan admitted that the purchase was "spur of the moment", deciding to bid for the filly only after seeing her enter the sale ring.

== Racing career ==
=== Two-year-old season ===
As a two-year-old, Katie Lee raced six times for two wins and three second placings. She showed a hint of her potential with a three-length win in the Group 3 Eclipse Stakes at Ellerslie on 1 January 2009. Her two-year-old season ended with a disappointing eighth, possibly due to chronic foot problems that plagued her as a two-year-old, in the Karaka Million.

=== Three-year-old season ===
Returning as a three-year-old, Katie Lee finished third in the Gold Trail Stakes at Hastings before a spectacular win in the James & Annie Sarten Memorial Stakes at Te Rapa, an increasingly important lead-up race to the 1000 and 2000 Guineas at Riccarton Park.

In the 2000 Guineas on 7 November, Katie Lee overcame considerable traffic problems to defeat Military Move and Clapton in the $1,000,000 Group one (G1) event. After the race, co-trainer Graeme Rogerson stated that provided the filly came through the race well, the intention was to back up in the 1000 Guineas seven days later.

Sent out as a $1.70 favourite in the 1000 Guineas, Katie Lee again encountered traffic problems in the race before producing yet another outstanding finishing sprint. Runner-up Keep The Peace, a stablemate of 2000 Guineas second placegetter Military Move, provided stiff resistance, but Katie Lee stuck her head out at the finish line to win by the margin of half a neck. Her historic double was made more notable when the runners-up in each of the races went on to win the New Zealand Derby and New Zealand Oaks respectively.

Katie Lee followed her Guineas victories with a second at Group 3 level, before a Group 2 win in the Eight Carat Classic at Ellerslie on Boxing Day and a second in the Group 2 Royal Stakes at the same venue on New Year's Day. She then ran third in the Desert Gold Stakes at Trentham before winning the Group 2 Sir Tristram Fillies Classic at Te Rapa.

Katie Lee's connections attempted to make further history in seeking a rare victory for a filly in the New Zealand Derby, but a mixture of a tough and long campaign and the 2,400 metres of the Derby meant she was unable to perform as expected, finishing 14th.

=== Four-year-old season ===
The start of Katie Lee's four-year-old campaign was delayed by wet tracks, with her first run resulting in a third placing at Ruakaka on 18 September. She bounced back to winning form at her second start back, winning the Group 3 Traderacks Stakes (formerly G.R.Kelt Memorial) at Hastings on 2 October, putting in a similar run to her two Guineas victories. After a series of performances in which she was well below her best regardless of an unfavourable track, Katie Lee was officially retired on 16 August 2011 and joins the ranks of top class broodmares.

== See also ==
- Thoroughbred racing in New Zealand
