= Ballindooley =

Village in County Galway, Ireland

Ballindooly Baile an Dúlaigh
- Village
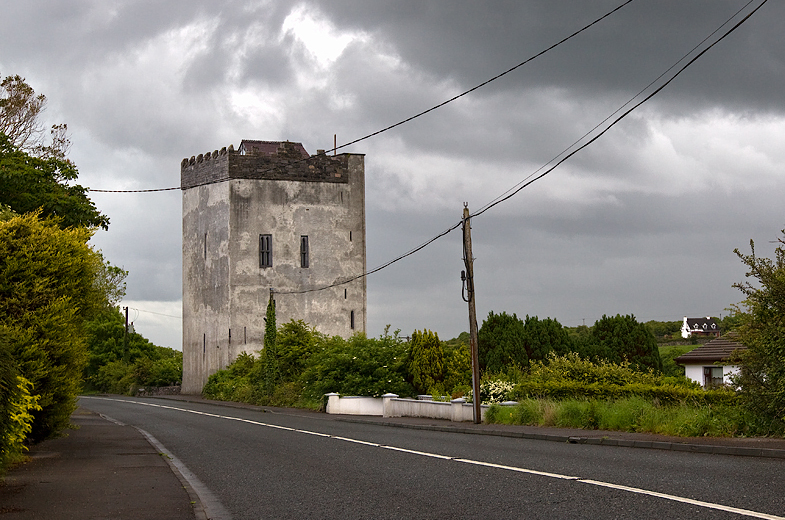
- Ballindooly (or Ballindooley) Castle

- Location in Ireland
- Coordinates: 53°18′49″N 9°01′23″W
- Country: Ireland
- Province: Connacht
- County: County Galway
- Time zone: UTC+0 (WET)
  - Summer (DST): UTC-1 (IST (WEST))
- Website: www.ballindooleycastle.ie

Ballindooley, officially Ballindooly (Irish: Baile an Dúlaigh), is a village in County Galway, Ireland. It is north of Galway city and in the ecclesiastical parish of Castlegar. There is a 15th century castle in the area, Ballindooley Castle, which was refurbished and sold in late 2016. The village itself is just off the Galway City to Headford (N84) road. Ballindooley Lake, which is sometimes referred to as Ballindooley Lough, is a small lake located southeast of the castle.

== See also ==
- List of towns and villages in Ireland
