= Castlegar GAA =

Gaelic games club in County Galway, Ireland

Castlegar
- An Caisleán Gearr
- Founded: 1880
- County: Galway
- Nickname: Cashel
- Colours: Green and white
- Grounds: Castlegar
- Coordinates: 53.277°N 8.976°W

Playing kits
Standard colours

Senior Club Championships
	All Ireland	Connacht champions	Galway champions
Hurling:	1	4	17

Castlegar GAA is a Gaelic Athletic Association club located in the parish of Castlegar in County Galway, Ireland. The club is almost exclusively concerned with the game of hurling.

== Overview ==
It is believed that hurling has been played in Castlegar since the 1880s. No records exist regarding hurling in the area prior to that decade, however, local folklore has it that the parish had a hurling team prior to 1880. Most of the matches played by Castlegar in those days were played in Claregalway, Turloughmore and Oranmore.

Castlegar is one of the most successful clubs in the Galway Senior Hurling Championship, winning 17 titles between 1936 and 1984. The club won the All-Ireland Senior Club Hurling Championship in 1980.

== Honours ==
- All-Ireland Senior Club Hurling Championships (1): 1980
- Connacht Senior Club Hurling Championships (4): 1972, 1973, 1979, 1984
- Galway Senior Club Hurling Championships (17): 1936, 1937, 1938, 1939, 1940, 1944, 1950, 1952, 1953, 1957, 1958, 1967, 1969, 1972, 1973, 1979, 1984
- Galway Under-21 Hurling Championships (5): 1967, 1974, 1982, 1999, 2000
- Galway Minor Hurling Championships (7): 1949, 1953, 1965, 1982, 1985, 2000, 2017

== Notable players ==
- Joe Connolly
- John Connolly
- Michael Connolly
- Jimmy Hegarty
- Ger Farragher
- Mick King

=== 1979-80 All-Ireland champions ===
The Castlegar team, that won the 1979–80 All-Ireland Senior Club Hurling Championship, included:

#	Name	Position
First Team
1	Tommy Grogan	Goalkeeper
2	Ted Murphy	Right corner back
3	Pádraic Connolly	Full back
4	John Coady	Left corner back
5	Gerry Glynn	Right half back
6	John Connolly	Centre back
7	Michael Glynn	Left half back
8	Tom Murphy	Midfield
9	Séamus Fahy	Midfield
10	Jimmy Francis	Right half forward
11	Joe Connolly	Centre forward
12	Pakie O'Connor	Left half forward
13	Gerry Connolly	Right corner forward
14	Michael Connolly (c)	Full forward
15	Liam Mulryan	Left corner forward
Sub used
	Pat Burke	
