= Michael Connolly (hurler) =

Irish former sportsperson

Personal information
- Native name: Mícheál Ó Conghaile (Irish)
- Born: 19 June 1954 (age 72) Castlegar, County Galway, Ireland
- Occupation: Carpenter
- Height: 6 ft 1 in (185 cm)

Sport
- Sport: Hurling
- Position: Midfield
Club
- Years: Club
- Castlegar
Club titles
- All-Ireland Titles: 1
Inter-county
- Years: County
- 1973-1986: Galway
Inter-county titles
- All-Irelands: 1
- NHL: 0
- All Stars: 0

Michael Connolly (born 19 June 1954) is an Irish former sportsperson. He played hurling with his local club Castlegar and was a member of the Galway and London senior inter-county teams from the 1970s until the 1990s.

Sporting positions
Preceded by	Galway Senior Hurling Captain; 1984	Succeeded by Brendan Lynskey
