= McQuillan GAC Ballycastle =

Antrim-based Gaelic games club

- MacUílín CLG Baile an Chaisleáin
- Founded: 1907
- County: Antrim
- Nickname: The Town
- Colours: Black and amber
- Grounds: Páirc MacUílín (4,900 capacity)

Playing kits
Home Kit	Change & GK Kit

Senior Club Championships
	All Ireland	Ulster champions	Antrim champions
Football:	0	0	0
Hurling:	0	6	17
Camogie:	0	0	0

McQuillan GAC Ballycastle (Irish: MacUílín CLG Baile an Chaisleáin) is a Gaelic Athletic Association club located in the town of Ballycastle in County Antrim, Northern Ireland. The club is affiliated with the Antrim county board. They play their home matches at Páirc MacUílín which has also hosted the Antrim Senior Hurlers on occasion due to the ongoing redevelopment of Casement Park. The club is sponsored by MyEnergi.

== History ==
The club was founded in 1907. The name McQuillan originated from the ancient local clan McQuillan of whom Rory McQuillan who built Bonamargy Friary for the Franciscans and Julia McQuillan the Black Nun were members, their motto was death before dishonour.

== Hurling ==
Since its inception over 100 years ago McQuillan GAC has made a huge contribution to the tradition of hurling encouraging and nurturing the ancient art and providing a steady stream of hurlers to represent club, county and nation. The club won its first title the North Antrim Senior Hurling Championship in 1909 and its first County Senior Hurling Championship in 1913.

McQuillan GAC is the only Antrim club to have received two All Star Awards and club players were elected all star replacements on a further six occasions. Club players represented Ireland in various other capacities on six additional occasions. Fifteen club players have represented Antrim in All Ireland Finals; seven at senior grade and three were selected on the 1984 Team of the Century.

Locally known as "The Town", they were the first Antrim team to complete two "hat tricks" of wins in 1952–54, and 1978–80. Eddie Donnelly's eight championship medals is a club record and ranks highly in the county. In 1980 McQuillan GAC were the first Antrim team to contest an All Ireland Club Final. In 1986 McQuillan GAC made a clean sweep of County Senior and Senior Reserve Championships and League titles along with the Ulster Club Hurling Championship.

The club continues to place a high priority on the development of its young players and history testifies to the benefits of previous similar policies. In the 1940s shortly after Seamus Clarke introduced Minor Hurling to North Antrim, McQuillan GAC claimed 6 Minor Titles and these players graduated to win 6 Senior Titles during the 1940s and '50s. A similar policy was with the Feile Na Gael Teams in the 1970s, one of which in 1975 contested the All Ireland Div 2 final, produced 3 Minor Titles and 8 Senior Titles during the 1970s and 80s.

The club currently compete in the Antrim Senior Hurling Championship and Division 1 in the Antrim County Hurling League. The Senior Reserve team take part in the Division 1 Reserve League.

=== Notable players ===
- Neal McAuley
- Brian Donnelly
- Cormac Donnelly
- Dessie Donnelly
- Terence Donnelly
- Ryan McGarry
- Paul McKillen

== Gaelic football ==
McQuillan GAC compete in the Antrim Junior Football Championship, and in Division 3 of the All-County Football League, finishing in third place in 2014. "The Town" have won the Antrim Junior Football Championship on one occasion, in 1934.

The club also won the Antrim County Football League Division 6 title in 2008 and have won North Antrim Junior Football Feis titles in 2006, 2008, 2009, 2010, 2011 and 2019.

== Honours ==
=== Hurling ===
Championships

- All-Ireland Club Senior Hurling Championship (0)
  - Runners-up 1980
- Ulster Senior Club Hurling Championship (6)
  - 1978, 1979, 1980, 1983, 1984, 1986
- Antrim Senior Hurling Championship (17)
  - 1913, 1914, 1933, 1944, 1948, 1950, 1952, 1953, 1954, 1964, 1975, 1978, 1979, 1980, 1983, 1984, 1986
- Antrim Under-21 Hurling Championship (3)
  - 2007, 2010, 2012
- Antrim Minor Hurling Championship (12)
  - 1929, 1940, 1941, 1942, 1946, 1948, 1965, 1967, 1973, 1977, 1978, 1990
- Antrim Junior Hurling Championship (1)
  - 1980
- Antrim Senior Reserve Hurling Championship (2)
  - 1986, 2012
- North Antrim Senior Hurling Championship (10)
  - 1909, 1910, 1912, 1913, 1914, 1915, 1932, 1933, 1934, 1944
- North Antrim Junior Hurling Championship (12)
  - 1916, 1934, 1960, 1965, 1966, 1968, 1974, 1977, 1980, 1993, 1996, 2001
- North Antrim Senior Reserve Hurling Championship (2)
  - 1985, 1986
- North Antrim Minor Hurling Championship (23)
  - 1929, 1932, 1940, 1941, 1942, 1943, 1944, 1947, 1948, 1954, 1956, 1964, 1965, 1967, 1968, 1970, 1972, 1973, 1974, 1977, 1978, 1989, 1990

=== Football ===
Championships

- Antrim Junior Football Championship (1)
  - 1934
- North Antrim Junior Football Championship (6)
  - 1932, 1933, 1934, 1974, 1977, 1979
- North Antrim Minor Football Championship (2)
  - 1947, 1948

Leagues & Cups

- Antrim Senior Football League Division Six (1)
  - 2008
- North Antrim Junior Football Feis Shield (6)
  - 2006, 2008, 2009, 2010, 2011, 2019

== All Star Awards ==
=== All-Ireland Senior Hurling Championship – GAA GPA All Stars Awards ===
- Dessie Donnelly (1989)
- Paul McKillen (1993)

=== All-Ireland Senior Hurling Championship – GAA GPA All Stars Awards Replacements ===
- Eddie Donnelly (1975, 1977)
- Brian Donnelly (1985)
- Dessie Donnelly (1987)
- Paul McKillen (1988)

=== All-Ireland Under-21 Hurling Championship – Bord Gáis Energy Team of the Year ===
- Ciaran Clarke (2013)
- Stephen McAfee (2013)

=== Christy Ring Cup Champion 15 Awards ===
- Ciaran Clarke (2016)

=== Antrim GAA – Hurling Team of the Century (1884–1984) ===
- Peter Boyle (1984)
- John Butler (1984)
- Eddie Donnelly (1984)

== Achievements ==
=== All Star Awards ===
- Two McQuillan players have received All Star Awards, Dessie Donnelly (1989) and Paul McKillen (1993). Dessie also captained the team in their exhibition game against Tipperary in the SkyDome, Toronto.
- Eddie Donnelly (1975, 1977), Brian Donnelly (1985), Dessie Donnelly (1987) and Paul McKillen (1988) were selected to tour North America with the All Stars.

=== Ireland Representatives ===
- Robbie Elliot played at full forward for Ireland against the Combined Universities in 1954
- John Butler played midfield for Ireland against Britain in 1936
- Eddie Donnelly (1976, 1977), Ronan Donnelly (1994), Ciaran Kelly (2002), Cormac Donnelly (2012) and Neal McAuley (2014, 2015) represented Ireland in Senior Hurling /Shinty Internationals. Neal McAuley (2006), Stephen McAfee (2013), Ciaran Clarke (2013) and Matthew Donnelly (2013) have represented Ireland in the U-21 Hurling/Shinty International.

=== Inter County honours ===
- Three past players were named on the 1984 Antrim Team of the Century, John Butler, Eddie Donnelly and Peter Boyle
- McQuillan GAC had four representatives on the Antrim team which contested the 1989 All Ireland Final with Tipperary, Paul McKillen, Brian, Dessie and Terence Donnelly
- John Butler played on the Antrim team which lost the 1943 All Ireland Final to Cork, John McNeill and Donal Boylan were in the reserves
- McQuillan GAC had three representatives on the Antrim team which won the 1970 All Ireland Intermediate Title, Paddy McShane, Eddie and Kevin Donnelly
- Eight club players won All Ireland "B” Championship medals in 1978, 1981 and 1982. Peter and Stephen Boyle and Brian, Dessie, Eddie, Kevin, Seamus and Terence Donnelly.
- James Butler and Frank Fleming played on the Antrim team which lost the 1940 All Ireland Minor Final to Limerick
- Stephen McAfee, Matthew Donnelly and Ciaran Clarke were all members of the Antrim U21 Hurling squad that defeated Wexford in the 2013 All-Ireland Semi-final. This side were the first Ulster representatives to reach the final at this level. All three then took part in Antrim's first All-Ireland final appearance since 1989 in the defeat to Clare at Semple Stadium.
- Stephen McAfee also won the UGAAWA Merit Award trophy for his display as well as man of the match in the semi-final.
- In the same year Ciaran Clarke and Stephen McAfee were named on the Bord Gáis Energy Team of the Year of the year, the equivalent of All Stars at U21 level.

=== All-Ireland Poc Fada Competition ===
- Dessie Donnelly twice won the All Ireland Poc Fada Pairs competition partnering Christy Ryan of Clare in 1987 and Tommy Quaid of Limerick in 1990.

=== County, Provincial and National Championships ===
- In 1980 McQuillan GAC were the first Antrim team to contest an All Ireland Club Final, losing narrowly to Castlegar of Galway.
- McQuillan GAC have for some time held the record number of County Senior Championship wins they currently hold seventeen titles.
- In 1952–1954 and 1978–1980 the club were the first Antrim team to win two "hat tricks" of Senior Championships wins
- McQuillan GAC appeared in all eight championship finals between 1977 and 1984 winning five titles. Dermie Donnelly was team manager for 9 years from 1977 to 1985 inclusive
- Dessie Donnelly played in 15 championship finals from 1975 to 2001 playing in goals, backs and forwards and winning 7 medals.
- McQuillan GAC hold 10 league titles seven of which were won undefeated.
- The 1987 League win marked 5 consecutive league titles, unbeaten in league 4 consecutive seasons and unbeaten at home for 10 consecutive seasons in all official competitions within Ulster from 1978 to 1987 seasons inclusive.
- In 1986 McQuillan GAC won the County Senior Championship and League, County Senior Reserve Championship and League and the Ulster Club Championship.
- Eddie Donnelly's eight Antrim Senior Championship medals is a club record and ranks highly in the county, he also won eight league medals.
- In recent years the club has been relatively successful in the U21 Hurling Championship winning three of the last eight titles in 2007, 2010 and 2012. This was followed up by a Senior Reserve Hurling Championship title in 2012.
- McQuillan GAC also hold a county football title, the 1934 Antrim Junior Football Championship. The club is the most successful side in the Junior Football Feis Cup, winning five of the last nine, including the inaugural title in 2006.
