= 2021 Galway Senior Hurling Championship =

Annual hurling competition season

Tournament details
- County: Galway
- Year: 2021
- Sponsor: Brooks

Winners
- Champions: St. Thomas' (5th win)
- Manager: Kenneth Burke
- Captain: Conor Cooney

Promotion/Relegation
- Promoted team(s): Moycullen
- Relegated team(s): Ballindereen

The 2021 Galway Senior Hurling Championship was the 124th staging of the Galway Senior Hurling Championship since its establishment in 1887. It was won by St. Thomas' for the fourth consecutive year and the sixth time in total.

Kilconieron participated in the senior championship having beaten Moycullen in the delayed 2020 Galway Intermediate Hurling Championship. The competition was sponsored by Brooks for the second of a 3-year partnership that started in 2020.

== Competition format ==
Twenty four teams compete in the initial group stages of the championship – the top ranked twelve teams compete in the Senior A Group and the second ranked twelve teams compete in the Senior B Group. Eight teams from the Senior A Group and four teams from the Senior B Group progress to the knockout stage. The competition format is explained further in each of the championship rounds in the sections below.

== Group stage ==
=== Senior A ===
Senior A consists of 12 teams divided into three groups of 4 teams. The top teams from each group plus one drawn second team qualify for the quarter finals. The remaining 2 second placed teams play in the preliminary quarter finals. The bottom team from each group will be relegated to playing in the following year's Senior B Section.

==== Senior A – Group 1 ====
Pos	Team	Pld	W	D	L	SF	SA	Diff	Pts
1	Craughwell	3	2	1	0	3–60	2–50	13	5
2	Turloughmore	3	2	1	0	4–57	2–52	11	5
3	Castlegar	3	1	0	2	5–56	3–55	7	2
4	Ahascragh-Fohenagh	3	0	0	3	0–44	5–60	-31	0

11 September 2021; 15:45; Round 1	Turloughmore	1–18 – 1–18	Craughwell	Pearse Stadium; Referee: Paul Fahy
11 September 2021; 15:45; Round 1	Conor Walsh (0–5 frees); Barry Callanan (1–1); Fergal Moore (0–3); Jamie Holland (0–2 frees); Sean Loftus, Damien Holland (0–2); Vincent Doyle, Diarmiud Mullen, Barry McDonagh (0–1)		Niall Healy (0–14, 0–10 frees); Patrick Monaghan, Thomas Monaghan, Adam Clarke, Jamie Ryan, Shane Dolan (1–0)	Pearse Stadium; Referee: Paul Fahy

12 September 2021; 11:30; Round 1	Castlegar	3–17 – 0–17	Ahascragh-Fohenagh	Loughrea; Referee: John Keane
12 September 2021; 11:30; Round 1	Oisin Connolly (1–8, 0–6 frees); Dean Higgins (1–2); Enda Concannon (1–0); Gerard Farragher, Cillian O'Callaghan (0–2); Simon Thomas, Jason O'Gorman, Jack Coyne (0–1)		Mark Kelly (0–8, frees); Sean Bleahene, Cathal Mannion, Padraic Mannion, Ronan Kelly (0–2); Robert Greene (0–1)	Loughrea; Referee: John Keane

25 September 2021; 14:00; Round 2	Craughwell	1–23 – 0–14	Ahascragh-Fohenagh	Kenny Park, Athenry; Referee: Karol Collins
25 September 2021; 14:00; Round 2	Niall Healy (0–10, 0–8 frees); Shane Dolan (1–3); Thomas Monaghan, Dean Callanan (0–2); Adrian Prendergast (0–2, 0–1 sideline); Stephen Hynes, Patrick Monaghan, Adam Clarke, Jamie Ryan (0–1)		Mark Kelly (0–7, 0–6 frees, 0–1 '65); Sean Bleahene (0–3); Cathal Mannion (0–3, 0–1 free); Ronan Kelly (0–1)	Kenny Park, Athenry; Referee: Karol Collins

26 September 2021; 14:00; Round 2	Turloughmore	2–19 – 1–21	Castlegar	Pearse Stadium; Referee: Alan Kelly
26 September 2021; 14:00; Round 2	Conor Walsh (1–9, 1–0 penalty, 0–8 frees); Sean O'Hanlon (0–3); Sean Loftus (1–0); Daithi Burke (0–2); Kevin Hussey, Vincent Doyle, Matthew Keating, Brian Callanan, Barry McDonagh (0–1)		Gerard Farragher (0–7, 0–4 frees, 0–1 '65); Enda Concannon (1–2); Jack Coyne (0–3); Oisin Connolly (0–3 frees); Dean Higgins (0–2); Tomas Mannion, Simon Thomas, Jason O'Gorman, Greg Thomas (0–1)	Pearse Stadium; Referee: Alan Kelly

9 October 2021; 16:30; Round 3	Craughwell	1–19 – 1–18	Castlegar	Pearse Stadium; Referee: John Keane
9 October 2021; 16:30; Round 3	Niall Healy (0–11, 0–9 frees); Thomas Monaghan (0–5); Jamie Ryan (1–0); Gerard O'Halloran, Patrick Monaghan, Dean Callanan (0–1)		Gerard Farragher (1–7, 1–3 frees, 0–1 65', 0–1 sideline); Oisin Connolly (0–3 frees); Cillian O'Callaghan (0–3); Mark Gill, Sean Neary, Simon Thomas, Enda Concannon, Donal McGreal (0–1)	Pearse Stadium; Referee: John Keane

9 October 2021; 16:30; Round 3	Turloughmore	1–20 – 0–13	Ahascragh-Fohenagh	Kenny Park, Athenry; Referee: Liam Gordon
9 October 2021; 16:30; Round 3	Conor Walsh (1–8, 0–7 frees, 0–1 65'); Sean Loftus (0–4); Jamie Holland, Kevin Hussey, Matthew Keating, Brian Callanan, Sean O'Hanlon, Barry McDonagh, Aaron O'Shaughnessy (0–1)		Mark Kelly (0–4, 0–2 frees); Cathal Mannion (0–2); Stephen Kelly, Padraic Mannion, Ronan Kelly, Niall Glynn (0–1)	Kenny Park, Athenry; Referee: Liam Gordon

==== Senior A – Group 2 ====
Pos	Team	Pld	W	D	L	SF	SA	Diff	Pts
1	St. Thomas'	3	3	0	0	4–62	4–41	21	6
2	Cappataggle	3	1	1	1	3–47	1–52	1	3
3	Killimordaly	3	0	2	1	1–45	4–56	-8	2
4	Liam Mellows	3	0	1	2	0–49	3–54	-14	1

- Cappataggle were drawn from the second placed teams to go straight into the quarter finals

11 September 2021; 16:45; Round 1	St. Thomas'	2–24 – 3–13	Killimordaly	Kenny Park, Athenry; Referee: Shane Hynes
11 September 2021; 16:45; Round 1	Conor Cooney (0–15, 0–9 frees); Oisin Flannery (1–2); Eanna Burke (1–1); Bernard Burke (0–2); Cathal Burke, David Burke, James Regan, Darragh Burke (0–1)		Paul Creaven (0–7, 0–6 frees); Adam Brett (1–1); Darren Daly (0–3); David Earls (1–0); Luke Lynskey (1–1); Brian Burke (0–1)	Kenny Park, Athenry; Referee: Shane Hynes

12 September 2021; 14:15; Round 1	Cappataggle	0–19 – 0–17	Liam Mellows	Kenny Park, Athenry; Referee: Brian Keon
12 September 2021; 14:15; Round 1	Liam Collins (0–8, 0–6 frees); Dan Nevin (0–3 frees); Paul Claffey (0–3); Ronan Garvey (0–2); Niall Collins (0–1 free); David Malone, James Egan (0–1)		Tadgh Haran (0–8, 0–7 frees, 0–1 sideline); Sean Morrissey, David Collins, Adrian Morrissey (0–2); Ronan Elwood, Conor Hynes, Conor Kavanagh (0–1)	Kenny Park, Athenry; Referee: Brian Keon

25 September 2021; 16:45; Round 2	Cappataggle	2–15 – 1–18	Killimordaly	Duggan Park, Ballinasloe; Referee: Liam Gordon
25 September 2021; 16:45; Round 2	Liam Collins (0–8, 0–7 frees); Oisin Finn (1–0); Patrick Egan, Declan Cronin, Darragh Dolan, Dan Nevin, Niall Collins, James Egan, Oran Finn (0–1)		Paul Creaven (0–9, 0–1 frees); Brian Concannon (0–4); Iomar Creaven (1–0); Eanna Ryan (0–2); Darren Daly, Jack Fitzpatrick, David Earls (0–1)	Duggan Park, Ballinasloe; Referee: Liam Gordon

26 September 2021; 16:00; Round 2	St. Thomas'	2–21 – 0–15	Liam Mellows	Pearse Stadium; Referee: John Keane
26 September 2021; 16:00; Round 2	Conor Cooney (0–7, 0–5 frees); Oisin Flannery (1–4); Eanna Burke (1–2); Darragh Burke (0–4); James Regan (0–2); Shane Cooney (0–1 free); Brendan Farrell (0–1)		Adrian Morrissey (0–8 frees); Mark Hughes (0–3 frees); Kevin Lee, Darren McPeake, Conor Hynes, Jack Forde (0–1)	Pearse Stadium; Referee: John Keane

10 October 2021; 16:30; Round 3	St. Thomas'	0–17 – 1–13	Cappataggle	Pearse Stadium; Referee: Shane Hynes
10 October 2021; 16:30; Round 3	Conor Cooney (0–8, 0–5 frees, 0–1 65'); Cathal Burke, David Burke, James Regan (0–2); Evan Duggan, Darragh Burke, Eanna Burke (0–1)		Liam Collins (1–7, 0–4 frees); Michael Garvey (0–2); Dan Nevin (0–2, 0–1 sideline); Niall Collins, Jarlath Mannion (0–1)	Pearse Stadium; Referee: Shane Hynes

10 October 2021; 16:30; Round 3	Killimordaly	1–14 – 0–17	Liam Mellows	Kenny Park, Athenry; Referee: Karol Collins
10 October 2021; 16:30; Round 3	Luke Lynskey (1–1); Brian Concannon (0–4); Paul Creaven (0–4, 0–2 frees); Jack Fitzpatrick (0–2); Brian Burke (0–2 frees); Eanna Ryan (0–1)		Tadgh Haran (0–6, 0–4 frees, 0–1 sideline); Adrian Morrissey (0–3); Jack Forde (0–2); Mark Hughes (0–1 free); Sean Morrissey, Conor Hynes, Rory Hynes, Jack Hastings, Conor Kavanagh (0–1)	Kenny Park, Athenry; Referee: Karol Collins

==== Senior A – Group 3 ====
Pos	Team	Pld	W	D	L	SF	SA	Diff	Pts
1	Tommy Larkin's	3	2	0	1	6–49	0–54	13	4
2	Loughrea	3	2	0	1	1–62	3–44	12	4
3	Sarsfields	3	2	0	1	2–63	2–54	9	4
4	Oranmore-Maree	3	0	0	3	1–40	5–62	-34	0

11 September 2021; 13:30; Round 1	Sarsfields	0–22 – 2–14	Tommy Larkin's	Duggan Park, Ballinasloe; Referee: Christopher Browne
11 September 2021; 13:30; Round 1	N. Morrissey (0–12, 0–9 frees); Ian Fox (0–3); Alex Connaire, Jeffrey Lawless (0–2); Joseph Cooney, Kevin Cooney, Alan Ward (0–1)		Jason Flynn (1–10, 0–7 frees); Adam Page (1–0); Ronan Murphy (0–2); Kevin McHugo, David Hickey (0–1)	Duggan Park, Ballinasloe; Referee: Christopher Browne

11 September 2021; 14:00; Round 1	Loughrea	1–19 – 1–11	Oranmore-Maree	Kenny Park, Athenry; Referee: Derek Kelly
11 September 2021; 14:00; Round 1	Jamie Ryan (0–11, 0–7 frees); Anthony Burns (1–2); Joe Mooney, Ian Hanrahan (0–2); Sean Sweeney, Brian Keary (0–1)		Niall Burke (0–9, 0–8 frees), Sean McInerney (1–1); Diarmuid Hanniffy (0–1)	Kenny Park, Athenry; Referee: Derek Kelly

25 September 2021; 16:45; Round 2	Sarsfields	2–23 – 0–16	Oranmore-Maree	Kenny Park, Athenry; Referee: Conor Quinlan
25 September 2021; 16:45; Round 2	Niall Morrissey (0–7, 0–5 frees, 0–1 '65); Mark O'Regan (2–1); Alex Connaire (0–4); Kenneth Cooney, Kevin Cooney, Ian Fox (0–3); Niall Quinn, Ian Skehill (0–1)		Niall Burke (0–9, 0–6 frees); Gearoid McInerney, Conor Butler, Jack Grealish, Conor Hanniffy, Padraic Keane, Diarmuid Hanniffy, Eanna Burke (0–1)	Kenny Park, Athenry; Referee: Conor Quinlan

26 September 2021; 13:30; Round 2	Tommy Larkin's	2–15 – 0–19	Loughrea	Duggan Park, Ballinasloe; Referee: Seamus Moran
26 September 2021; 13:30; Round 2	Jason Flynn (0–8, 0–6 frees, 0–2 sidelines); Conor Gardiner (1–3); Conor Slattery (0–3); Adam Page (1–0); Colm Flynn (0–1)		Jamie Ryan (0–9, 0–5 frees); Caimin Killeen, Joe Mooney, Anthony Burns, Kieran Hanrahan (0–2); Dylan Shaughnessy, Martin McManus (0–1)	Duggan Park, Ballinasloe; Referee: Seamus Moran

10 October 2021; 14:00; Round 3	Tommy Larkin's	2–20 – 0–13	Oranmore-Maree	Kenny Park, Athenry; Referee: Paul Fahy
10 October 2021; 14:00; Round 3	Jason Flynn (0–14, 0–8 frees, 0–2 sidelines); Ronan Murphy (1–1); Conor Gardiner (1–0); Colm Flynn (0–2); Brian McCormack, Kevin McHugo, Conor Slattery (0–1)		Niall Burke (0–8, 0–5 frees); Ruben Davitt (0–4); Conor Hanniffy (0–1)	Kenny Park, Athenry; Referee: Paul Fahy

10 October 2021; 14:00; Round 3	Loughrea	0–24 – 0–18	Sarsfields	Duggan Park, Ballinasloe; Referee: Conor Quinlan
10 October 2021; 14:00; Round 3	Jamie Ryan (0–15, 0–8 frees, 0–2 sideline); Anthony Burns (0–3); Neil Keary (0–2); Dylan Shaughnessy, Caimin Killeen, Kieran Hanrahan, Martin McManus (0–1)		Niall Morrissey (0–10, 0–8 frees); Ian Fox (0–3); Kevin Cooney (0–2, 0–1 sideline); Alex Connaire, Alan Ward, Joseph Cooney (0–1)	Duggan Park, Ballinasloe; Referee: Conor Quinlan

=== Senior B ===
Senior B consists of 12 teams divided into two groups of 6. The winners of each group qualify for the preliminary quarter finals and compete in the following year's Senior A competition. The four second and third placed teams play-off with the two winners also qualifying for the preliminary quarter finals.

==== Senior B – Group 1 ====
Pos	Team	Pld	W	D	L	SF	SA	Diff	Pts
1	Gort	3	3	0	0	1–71	6–35	19	6
2	Padraig Pearses	3	1	1	1	7–36	1–48	6	3
3	Athenry	3	0	2	1	5–50	4–54	-1	2
4	Tynagh-Abbey/Duniry	3	0	1	2	4–41	6–61	-26	1

11 September 2021; 16:15; Round 1	Padraig Pearses	1–16 – 1–16	Athenry	Duggan Park, Ballinasloe; Referee: Seamus Moran
11 September 2021; 16:15; Round 1	Eric Ward (0 11 frees); Dean Reilly (1–1); Conor Fahey, Tomas Flannery, Ronan Bellew, Oisin Flannery (0–1)		Cathal Keane (0–5, 0–4 frees); Paddy Rabbitte (1–0); Ryan O'Donnell (0–3); Paddy Hannon (0–2); Cian Burke (0–2, 0–1 free); Donal Parr (0–1, free); Conor Burke, Mark Hannon, Ronan Hardiman (0–1)	Duggan Park, Ballinasloe; Referee: Seamus Moran

20 September 2021; 19:00; Round 1	Gort	1–29 – 1–13	Tynagh-Abbey/Duniry	Duggan Park, Ballinasloe; Referee: Conor Quinlan
20 September 2021; 19:00; Round 1	Aidan Helebert (0–8, 0–3 frees); Albert Mullins (1–2); Jason Grealish (0–4); Darren O'Donoghue, Richie Cummins (0–3), Greg Lally (0–2, 0–1 frees, 0–1 '65s); Jack Grealish, Aidan Harte (0–2); Sylvie Óg Linnane, Pakie Lally, Keelan Higgins (0–1)	Report	Shane Moloney (0–6, 0–5 frees); Conor Jordan (1–1); Thomas Gordon (0–3); Niall Quirke (0–2); Johnny Conroy (0–1)	Duggan Park, Ballinasloe; Referee: Conor Quinlan

26 September 2021; 16:15; Round 2	Athenry	2–18 – 3–15	Tynagh-Abbey/Duniry	Duggan Park, Ballinasloe; Referee: Christopher Browne
26 September 2021; 16:15; Round 2	Cathal Keane (1–7, 1–0 penalty, 0–6 frees); Ryan O'Donnell (1–1); Cillian Lawless (0–3); Ronan Hardiman (0–2); Cian Burke, Ciaran O'Dwyer, Mark Hannon, Paddy Hannon, Noel Keogh (0–1)		Shane Moloney (0–10, 0–8 frees); Padraig Breheny (1–3); Padraig Robinson (2–0); Johnny Conroy (0–2)	Duggan Park, Ballinasloe; Referee: Christopher Browne

27 September 2021; 19:30; Round 2	Gort	0–19 – 3–6	Padraig Pearses	Duggan Park, Ballinasloe; Referee: Liam Gordon
27 September 2021; 19:30; Round 2	Aiden Helebert (0–8, 0–7 frees); Aidan Harte, Jason Grealish, Richie Cummins (0–2); Gavin Lally, Pakie Lally, Jack Grealish, Gerard O'Donoghue (0–1); Greg Lally (0–1 free)		Fergal Flannery (1–1 frees); Tomas Flannery (1–1, 0–1 free); Eric Ward (0–3 frees); Oisin Flannery (1–0); Conor Fahey (0–1)	Duggan Park, Ballinasloe; Referee: Liam Gordon

9 October 2021; 14:00; Round 3	Gort	0–23 – 2–16	Athenry	Pearse Stadium; Referee: Alan Kelly
9 October 2021; 14:00; Round 3	Aiden Helebert (0–11, 0–9 frees, 0–1 65'); Paddy Commins (0–4); Richie Cummins (0–3); Greg Lally (0–1 free); Jack Grealish, Aidan Harte, Mike Mullins, Gerard O'Donoghue (0–1)		Cathal Keane (0–6, 0–5 frees, 0–1 sideline); Ronan Hardiman (0–5); Paddy Rabbitte (1–1); Eoin Caulfield (1-O); Cillian Lawless (0–2); Mark Hardiman (0–1); Donal Parr (0–1 free)	Pearse Stadium; Referee: Alan Kelly

9 October 2021; 14:00; Round 3	Padraig Pearses	3–14 – 0–13	Tynagh-Abbey/Duniry	Duggan Park, Ballinasloe; Referee: Paul Fahy
9 October 2021; 14:00; Round 3	Emmet Ward (0–11, 0–9 frees); Tomas Flannery (1–1); Dean Reilly, Cormac Ward (1–0); Fergal Flannery (0–1 free); Jimmy Gelston (0–1)		Shane Moloney (0–8, 0–6 frees, 0–1 sideline); Padraig Breheny (0–3); Ben Moran, Thomas Gordon (0–1)	Duggan Park, Ballinasloe; Referee: Paul Fahy

==== Senior B – Group 2 ====
Pos	Team	Pld	W	D	L	SF	SA	Diff	Pts
1	Clarinbridge	3	3	0	0	1–75	2–39	33	4
2	Kilnadeema-Leitrim	3	2	0	1	3–56	3–61	-5	4
3	Ardrahan	3	1	0	2	4–44	2–57	-7	2
4	Mullagh	3	0	0	3	3–41	4–59	-21	0

11 September 2021; 13:30; Round 1	Kilnadeema-Leitrim	1–20 – 2–16	Mullagh	Pearse Stadium; Referee: Richard McNicholas
11 September 2021; 13:30; Round 1	Brian Molloy (1–9, 0–7 frees); Mikey Lynch (0–4); Vinny Kenny (0–3); Conor Molloy (0–2); Kevin Roche, Dylan Towolawi (0–1)		Cathal Dervan (1–8, 1–0 penalty, 0–7 frees); Damien Monaghan (1–1); Sean Hardiman, Davy Glennon (0–2); Ronan Glennon, Finian Coone, Dean Finnerty (0–1)	Pearse Stadium; Referee: Richard McNicholas

11 September 2021; 14:00; Round 1	Clarinbridge	1–23 – 0–12	Ardrahan	Gort; Referee: Sean Byrne
11 September 2021; 14:00; Round 1	Evan Niland (0–14, 0–13 frees); Cian Salmon (1–1); Sean Kilduff, Patrick Foley, Niall Armstrong (0–2); Shane Bannon, Mark Kennedy (0–1)		Cianin Fahy (0–7, 0–5 frees); Iarla Tannian (0–3); Darrach Fahy (0–1, 65'); Oisin Slevin (0–1);	Gort; Referee: Sean Byrne

25 September 2021; 14:00; Round 2	Clarinbridge	0–28 – 1–16	Kilnadeema-Leitrim	Duggan Park, Ballinasloe; Referee: Shane Hynes
25 September 2021; 14:00; Round 2	Evan Niland (0–11, 0–9 frees, 0–1 '65); Sean Kilduff (0–4); Mark Kennedy, Niall Armstrong (0–3); Shane Bannon (0–2); T.J. Brennan, Patrick Foley, Gavin Lee, Cian Salmon, Mikey Daly (0–1)		Brian Molloy (0–8, 0–6 frees, 0-1'65); Mikey Lynch (0–3); Vinny Kenny (1–0); Dylan Towolawi (0–2); Kevin Roche, Colm Molloy, Jack Kenny (0–1)	Duggan Park, Ballinasloe; Referee: Shane Hynes

26 September 2021; 16:15; Round 2	Ardrahan	3–15 – 0–14	Mullagh	Loughrea; Referee: Paul Fahy
26 September 2021; 16:15; Round 2	Cianin Fahy (2–9, 0–8 frees); Jason Kennedy (1–1); Oisin Slevin, Eoin Murphy, Michael Walsh, Liam Forde, Ross Albertini (0–1)		Cathal Dervan (0–9, 0–6 frees, 0–1 '65); Davy Glennon, Keith Coen (0–2); Ronan Glennon (0–1 free)	Loughrea; Referee: Paul Fahy

9 October 2021; 16:30; Round 3	Kilnadeema-Leitrim	1–20 – 1–17	Ardrahan	Duggan Park, Ballinasloe; Referee: Brian Keon
9 October 2021; 16:30; Round 3	Brian Molloy (0–9, 0–7 frees); Mikey Lynch (1–4); Dylan Towolowi, Colm Molloy, Vinny Kenny (0–2); Kevin Roche (0–1)		Cianin Fahy (1–13, 0–9 frees); Oisin Slevin, Cian Walsh, Iarla Tannian, Jason Kennedy (0–1)	Duggan Park, Ballinasloe; Referee: Brian Keon

10 October 2021; 12:00; Round 3	Clarinbridge	0–24 – 1–11	Mullagh	Clarinbridge; Referee: Sean Byrne

==== Senior B – Group 3 ====
Pos	Team	Pld	W	D	L	SF	SA	Diff	Pts
1	Kilconieron	3	2	1	0	2–62	5–45	8	5
2	Portumna	3	1	1	1	3–54	5–51	-3	3
3	Beagh	3	1	0	2	2–55	2–57	-1	2
4	Ballinderreen	3	1	0	2	9–43	4–61	0	2

11 September 2021; 17:00; Round 1	Kilconieron	0–21 – 0–18	Beagh	Loughrea; Referee: Peter Murphy
11 September 2021; 17:00; Round 1	Shane Caulfield (0–14, 0–10 frees, 0–1 '65); Colin Curley (0–2), David Mangan, Sean Connaughton (0–2); Sean Burke (0–1)		Evan Hunt (0–10, 0–7 frees); Patrick Earley, Padraic Landers, D Keane (0–2); Joe Gantley, Matthew Rosengrave (0–1)	Loughrea; Referee: Peter Murphy

12 September 2021; 11:30; Round 1	Ballinderreen	4–15 – 1–19	Portumna	Kenny Park, Athenry; Referee: Karol Collins
12 September 2021; 11:30; Round 1	Roy Lane (1–6, 0–4 frees, 0–1 sideline); Niall Coen (3–0); Luke Prendergast, David O'Connor (0–2); Cathal Gill, Evan Morgan, Kevin Lane, Kieran Ryan, Rory Foy (0–1)		Ronan O'Meara (0–7, 0–3 frees); Jack Canning (1–3, 1–1 frees, 0–1 slideline); Joe Canning (0–3, 0–2 frees); Neil Connelly (0 2); Andy Smith, Adam Fogarty, Owen Treacy, Sean Brien (0–1)	Kenny Park, Athenry; Referee: Karol Collins

25 September 2021; 14:00; Round 2	Portumna	2–17 – 1–20	Kilconieron	Loughrea; Referee: Derek Kelly
25 September 2021; 14:00; Round 2	Ronan O'Meara (0–10, 0–8 frees); Declan McLoughlin (2–1); Jamie Hogan, Neil Connelly (0–2); Sean Brien, Martin Dolphin (0–1)		Shane Caulfield (0–10, 0–9 frees); Sean Connaughton (1–2, 0–1 sideline); Brian Hickey, David Mangan (0–2); Conor Caulfield, Ultan McGlynn, Ian McGlynn, Padraig Burke (0–1)	Loughrea; Referee: Derek Kelly

25 September 2021
16:45
Round 2
Beagh
2–21 – 2–18
Ballinderreen
Loughrea
Referee: Brian Keon
Evan Hunt (0–12, 0–8 frees); Padraic Landers (1–2); Daithi Keane (1–1); Kevin Keehan,

Joe Gantley (0–2); Stephen Diviney (0–1 free); Matthew Rosengrave (0–1)

Roy Lane (0–11, 0–9 frees, 0–2 '65); Niall Coen (0–2); David O'Connor, Kevin Lane (1–1); Evan Morgan, Robbie Meehan, Padraig Lafferty (0–1)

10 October 2021; 16:30; Round 3	Portumna	0–18 – 0–16	Beagh	Tynagh; Referee: James Lundon
10 October 2021; 16:30; Round 3	Ronan O'Meara (0–8, 0–7 frees); Sean Brien (0–4); Adam Fogarty (0–3); Andy Smith (0–2); Declan McLoughlin (0–1)		Evan Hunt (0–13, 0–12 free, 0–1 65'); Kevin Keehan (0–2, 0–1 free); Daithi Keane (0–1)	Tynagh; Referee: James Lundon

10 October 2021; 16:30; Round 3	Kilconieron	1–21 – 3–10	Ballinderreen	New Inn; Referee: Brian Keon
10 October 2021; 16:30; Round 3	Shane Caulfield (0–11, 0–10 frees); Brian Hickey (1–2); Colin Curley, Sean Connaughton (0–2); Ultan McGlynn, Cormac Dillon, Ian McGlynn, David Mangan (0–1)		Roy Lane (2–5, 0–2 frees, 0–1 65'); Rory Foy (1–0); Shane Larkin, David O'Connor, Kevin Lane, Luke Prendergast, Niall Coen (0–1)	New Inn; Referee: Brian Keon

== Senior Relegation ==
Pos	Team	Pld	W	D	L	SF	SA	Diff	Pts
1	Mullagh	2	2	0	0	3–29	2–23	9	4
2	Ballinderreen	2	1	0	1	3–16	2–19	2	2
3	Tynagh-Abbey/Duniry	2	0	0	2	2–19	4–24	-11	0

23 October 2021; 14:30; Relegation Round 1	Ballindereen	2–7 – 1–7	Tynagh-Abbey/Duniry	Loughrea; Referee: Peter Murphy

6 November 2021; 13:30; Relegation Round 2	Mullagh	1–12 – 1–11	Ballindereen	Gort; Referee: Paul Fahy

14 November 2021; 14:30; Relegation Round 3	Mullagh	2–17 – 1–12	Tynagh-Abbey/Duniry	Duggan Park, Ballinasloe; Referee: Ger O'Connor

=== Senior Relegation Playoff ===
28 November 2021; 14:00; Relegation Play Off	Tynagh-Abbey/Duniry	0-12 - 0-11	Ballindereen	Duggan Park, Ballinasloe; Referee: Derek Kelly

== Senior Knockout stage ==
=== Senior Preliminary Quarter-finals ===
16 October 2021; 16:00; Preliminary Quarter-final	Clarinbridge	1–10 – 1–7	Loughrea	Kenny Park, Athenry; Referee: Shane Hynes
16 October 2021; 16:00; Preliminary Quarter-final	Evan Niland (0–4, 0–2 frees); Mark Kennedy (1–1); Gavin Lee (0–3); Mikey Daly (0–2)		Jamie Ryan (0–5, 0–4 frees); Shane O'Brien (1–0); Johnny Coen, Joe Mooney (0–1)	Kenny Park, Athenry; Referee: Shane Hynes

17 October 2021; 13:00; Preliminary Quarter-final	Kilnadeema-Leitrim	2–17 – 1–17	Turloughmore	Duggan Park, Ballinasloe; Referee: Christopher Browne
17 October 2021; 13:00; Preliminary Quarter-final	Brian Molloy (0–8, 0–6 frees, 0–1 '65); Dylan Towolawi, Mikey Lynch (1–1); Colm Molloy (0–4); Conor Molloy (0–2); Jack Kenny (0–1)		Conor Walsh (0–5 frees); Barry McDonagh (1–1); Diarmuid Mullen, Sean Loftus (0–3); Jamie Holland (0–1 free); Kevin Hussey, Sean O'Hanlon, Barry Callanan, Damien Holland (0–1)	Duggan Park, Ballinasloe; Referee: Christopher Browne

17 October 2021; 14:30; Preliminary Quarter-final	Gort	1–22 – 2–18	Portumna	Loughrea; Referee: Derek Kelly
17 October 2021; 14:30; Preliminary Quarter-final	Aiden Helebert (0–10, 0–6 frees, 0–2 '65); Paddy Commins (1–1); Greg Lally (0–3 frees); Aidan Harte (0–3); Richie Cummins (0–2); Pakie Lally, Jack Grealish, Jason Grealish (0–1)		Ronan O'Meara (0–8, 0–7 frees); Sean Brien (2–2); Declan McLaughlin, Jamie Hogan (0–2); Martin Dolphin, Owen Treacy, Andy Smith, Jack Canning (0–1)	Loughrea; Referee: Derek Kelly

17 October 2021; 16:00; Preliminary Quarter-final	Kilconerion	2–19 – 0–18; A.E.T.	Pádraig Pearses	Kenny Park, Athenry; Referee: Conor Quinlan
17 October 2021; 16:00; Preliminary Quarter-final	Shane Caulfield (0–9, 0–7 frees); Conor Caulfield, David Mangan (0–3); Sean Connaughton, Eamon Hickey (1–0); Colin Curley, Brian Hickey (0–2)		Emmet Ward (0–10, 0–7 frees); Conor Fahey (0–2); Tomas Flannery (0–2 frees); Jimmy Gelston, Gareth Lally, Oisin Flannery, Cormac Ward (0–1)	Kenny Park, Athenry; Referee: Conor Quinlan

=== Senior Quarter-finals ===
The three teams who finished first in the Senior A groups and one of the second placed teams (drawn at random) will play the four winners of the senior preliminary quarter finals.

23 October 2021; 13:00; Quarter-final	Gort	0–19 – 0–18	Cappataggle	Pearse Stadium; Referee: John Keane
23 October 2021; 13:00; Quarter-final	Aiden Helebert (0–11, 0–9 frees); Richie Commins (0–3); Darren O'Donoghue, Paddy Commins (0–2); Gerard O'Donoghue (0–1)	Report	Liam Collins (0–10, 0–4 frees); Dan Nevin (0–2, 0–1 free); James Egan (0–2); Jaralth Mannion, David Malone, Niall Collins, Donal Mannion (0–1)	Pearse Stadium; Referee: John Keane

23 October 2021; 15:30; Quarter-final	Clarinbridge	1–17 – 1–12	Tommy Larkin's	Kenny Park, Athenry; Referee: Paul Fahy
23 October 2021; 15:30; Quarter-final	Evan Niland (0–11, 0–9 frees); Cian Salmon (1–1); Mikey Daly (0–2); T.J. Brennan, Patrick Foley, Niall Armstrong (0–1)		Jason Flynn (1–9, 0–9 frees); Ronan Murphy (0–2); Conor Gardiner (0–1)	Kenny Park, Athenry; Referee: Paul Fahy

24 October 2021; 13:00; Quarter-final	St. Thomas'	3–29 – 1–9	Kilconieron	Duggan Park, Ballinasloe; Referee: Alan Kelly
24 October 2021; 13:00; Quarter-final	Conor Cooney (1–16, 0–14 frees, 0–1 '65); Eanna Burke (1–7); Darragh Burke (1–0); Bernard Burke, James Regan (0–2); Oison Flannery, Victor Manso (0–1)	Report	Shane Caulfield (0–5, 0–4 frees); David Mangan (1–0); Conor Caulfield, Ian McGlynn, Sean Burke, Brian Hickey (0–1)	Duggan Park, Ballinasloe; Referee: Alan Kelly

24 October 2021; 15:45; Quarter-final	Craughwell	0–27 – 0–9	Kilnadeema-Leitrim	Duggan Park, Ballinasloe; Referee: Liam Gordon
24 October 2021; 15:45; Quarter-final	Niall Healy (0–9, 0–6 frees); Adam Clarke (0–5); Thomas Monaghan (0–4); Patrick Monaghan (0–3); Adrian Prendergast (0–2); Dean Callanan, Keelan Cullinane, Shane Dolan, Jamie Ryan (0–1)	Report	Brian Molloy (0–5 frees); Kevin Roche, Tom Tierney, Dylan Towolawi (0–1); Conor Molloy (0–1 free)	Duggan Park, Ballinasloe; Referee: Liam Gordon

=== Senior Semi-finals ===
6 November 2021; 14:00; Semi-final	Clarinbridge	3–18 – 1–14	Craughwell	Kenny Park, Athenry; Referee: Conor Quinlan
6 November 2021; 14:00; Semi-final	Evan Niland (0–13, 0–7 frees, 0–2 '65); Niall Armstrong (1–2); Mikey Daly. Gavin Lee (1–1); Shane Ryan (0–1)	Report	Niall Healy (0–6, 0–4 frees); Keelan Cullinane (1–3, 1–0 penalty; 0–2 frees); Adam Clarke, Patrick Monaghan, Adrian Prendergast, Dean Callanan, Jamie Ryan (0–1)	Kenny Park, Athenry; Referee: Conor Quinlan

21 November 2021; 13:30; Semi-final	St. Thomas'	4–20 – 0–9	Gort	Pearse Stadium; Referee: Shane Hynes
21 November 2021; 13:30; Semi-final	Conor Cooney (1–10, 0–7 frees); Oisin Flannery (1–2); Damien McGlynn (1–1); James Regan (1–0); Eanna Burke, Cathal Burke (0–2); David Burke, Bernard Burke, Brendan Farrell (0–1)	Report	Aiden Helebert (0–7, 0–5 frees); Aidan Harte, Gerard O’Donoghue (0–1 each).	Pearse Stadium; Referee: Shane Hynes

=== Senior final ===
5 December 2021; 13:00; Final	St. Thomas'	0-20 - 0-17	Clarinbridge	Pearse Stadium; Referee: Liam Gordon
5 December 2021; 13:00; Final	Conor Cooney (0-11, 0-6 frees); Darragh Burke, Éanna Burke, Oisin Flannery, James Regan (0-2); David Burke (0-1)	Report	Evan Niland (0-10, 0-9 frees); Mark Kennedy, Gavin Lee (0-2); Niall Armstrong, Mikey Daly, T.J. Brennan (0-1)	Pearse Stadium; Referee: Liam Gordon

St. Thomas':
1	Gerald Kelly
4	David Sherry
3	Fintan Burke
2	Cian Mahoney
5	Evan Duggan
6	Shane Cooney
7	Cathal Burke
8	David Burke
9	Bernard Burke
12	James Regan
11	Conor Cooney (c)
14	Darragh Burke
15	Damian McGlynn
10	Eanna Burke
13	Oisin Flannery
Substitutes Used:
21	Victor Manso for Bernard Burke (50 mins)
20	Brendan Farrell for Damian McGlynn (51 mins)
18	Damien Finnerty for Eanna Burke (60+1 mins)
Manager:
Kenneth Burke

Clarinbridge:
1	Aaron Bindon
2	Christy Bannon
3	Ian O’Brien
4	Oisin Salmon
8	Sean Kilduff
6	T.J. Brennan
5	Shane Ryan
7	Shane Bannon (c)
9	Patrick Foley
10	Mikey Daly
11	Evan Niland
13	Mark Kennedy
12	Gavin Lee
14	Cian Salmon
15	Niall Armstrong
Substitutes Used:
19	Liam Leen for Niall Armstrong (44 mins)
Manager:
Jarlath Niland
