= 2018 Galway Senior Hurling Championship =

Annual hurling competition season

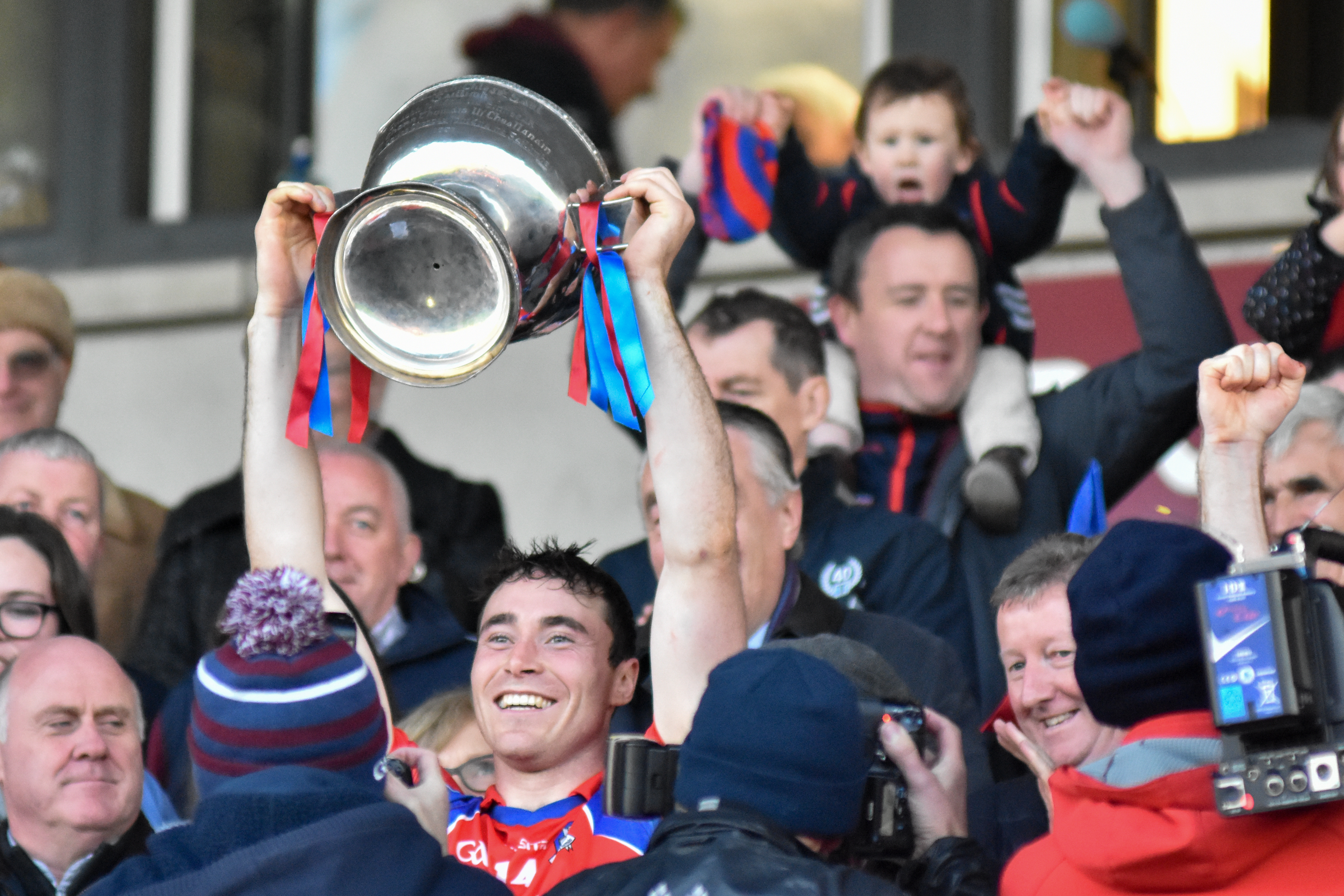

Tournament details
- County: Galway
- Year: 2018

Winners
- Champions: St. Thomas'
- Manager: Kevin Lally
- Captain: Conor Cooney

Promotion/Relegation
- Promoted team(s): N/A
- Relegated team(s): Moycullen

The 2018 Galway Senior Hurling Championship was the 121st staging of the Galway Senior Hurling Championship since its establishment in 1887.

The winners St. Thomas' were presented with the Tom Callanan Cup having beaten Liam Mellows in the final on 18 November.

Liam Mellows were the reigning champions. Ballinderreen participated in the senior championship having been promoted from the intermediate competition in 2017.

== Competition format ==
Twenty four reams compete in the initial group stages of the championship – the top ranked twelve teams compete in the Senior A Group and the second ranked twelve teams compete in the Senior B Group. Eight teams from the Senior A Group and four teams from the Senior B Group progress to the knockout stage. The competition format is explained further in each of the championship rounds in the sections below.

== Group stage ==
=== Senior A ===
Senior A consists of 12 teams divided into two groups of 6. The top two teams from each group automatically qualify for the quarter finals. The third and fourth teams from each group play in the preliminary quarter finals. The bottom two teams from each group play-off with the losing team relegated to playing in the following year's Senior B Section.

==== Senior A - Group 1 ====
Pos	Team	Pld	W	D	L	SF	SA	Diff	Pts
1	St. Thomas'	5	4	1	0	4-97	5-65	29	9
2	Liam Mellows	5	3	1	1	5-83	3-82	7	7
3	Tommy Larkin's	5	1	4	0	4-73	5-78	2	6
4	Castlegar	5	2	1	2	8-72	4-75	9	5
5	Craughwell	5	1	0	4	7-68	6-83	-12	2
6	Kilnadeema-Leitrim	5	0	1	4	3-73	7-96	-35	1

7 April 2018; 17:45; Round 1	St. Thomas'	1-17 - 0-14	Kilnadeema-Leitrim	Kenny Park, Athenry; Referee: Eoin Shaughnessy
7 April 2018; 17:45; Round 1	Conor Cooney (0-5 frees), David Burke (0-4), Darragh Burke (0-3), Brendan Farrell (0-3), Anthony Kelly (0-1), Bernard Burke (0-1), Eanna Burke (0-1)		Brian Molloy (0-10, 9 frees), Mikey Lynch (0-1), Conor Molloy (0-1), David Tierney (0-1), Gary Curley (0-1)	Kenny Park, Athenry; Referee: Eoin Shaughnessy

8 April 2018; 14:00; Round 1	Castlegar	1-12 - 0-15	Tommy Larkin's	Kinvara; Referee: John Keane
8 April 2018; 14:00; Round 1	Ger Farragher (1-8, 1-0 penalty, 8 frees), Enda Concannon (0-2), Sean Connolly (0-1), Kevin Keane (0-1)		Jason Flynn (0-8, 6 frees), Conor Gardiner (0-3), Kevin McHugo (0-2), Ronan Murphy (0-1), Kevin Hooban (0-1)	Kinvara; Referee: John Keane

8 April 2018; 17:45; Round 1	Liam Mellows	0-17 - 0-11	Craughwell	Kenny Park, Athenry; Referee: Christopher Browne
8 April 2018; 17:45; Round 1	Adrian Morrissey (0-13, 12 frees), Tadhg Haran (0-1), Conor Kavanagh (0-1), Aonghus Callanan (0-1), Kevin Lee (0-1)	Report	Niall Healy (0-7, 5 frees), Shane Dolan (0-1), Fergal Healy (0-1), Jamie Ryan (0-1), Alan Callanan (0-1)	Kenny Park, Athenry; Referee: Christopher Browne

21 April 2018; 14:00; Round 2	Craughwell	2-16 - 0-19	Kilnadeema-Leitrim	Loughrea; Referee: John McDonagh
21 April 2018; 14:00; Round 2	Niall Healy (0-8 frees), Thomas Monaghan (1-1), Jamie Ryan (1-0), Shane Dolan (0-3), Patrick Monaghan (0-1), Gerard O'Halloran (0-1), Andrew Greaney (0-1), Fergal Healy (0-1)		Brian Molloy (0-10, 8 frees), Dylan Towolwai (0-4), Stephen Molloy (0-1), Conor Molloy (0-1), Mikey Lynch (0-1), Mark Lawless (0-1), Gary Curley (0-1)	Loughrea; Referee: John McDonagh

21 April 2018; 16:00; Round 2	St. Thomas'	0-17 - 2-11	Tommy Larkin's	Duggan Park, Ballinasloe; Referee: Christy Browne
21 April 2018; 16:00; Round 2	Conor Cooney (0-8, 6 frees), David Burke (0-2), Brendan Farrell (0-2), Bernard Burke (0-2), Eanna Burke (0-1), Damien McGlynn (0-1), Darragh Burke (0-1 free)	Report	Jason Flynn (1-6, 6 frees), Eoghan Nevin (1-0), Cathal Kelly (0-1), Eamonn Hayes (0-1), Kevin McHugo (0-1), Conor Gardiner (0-1), Niall Kelly (0-1)	Duggan Park, Ballinasloe; Referee: Christy Browne

22 April 2018; 14:00; Round 2	Liam Mellows	3-15 - 2-13	Castlegar	Pearse Stadium; Referee: John Keane
22 April 2018; 14:00; Round 2	Adrian Morrissey (1-5, 1-0 penalty, 3 frees), Conor Kavanagh (2-1), Ronan Elwood (0-3), Kevin Lee (0-2), David Collins (0-1), Mark Hughes (0-1), Aonghus Callanan (0-1), Jack Forde (0-1)	Report	Ger Farragher (0-8, 7 frees), Kevin Keane (1-1), Enda Concannon (1-0), Dean Higgins (0-2, 1 free), Sean Connolloy (0-1), Jack Coyne (0-1)	Pearse Stadium; Referee: John Keane

1 September 2018; 17:45; Round 3	St. Thomas'	2-21 - 3-13	Craughwell	Kenny Park, Athenry; Referee: John McDonagh
1 September 2018; 17:45; Round 3	Darragh Burke (0-7, 3 frees), Bernard Burke (1-2), Mark Caulfield (1-0), James Regan (0-2), Eanna Burke (0-2), David Burke (0-2), Damien McGlynn (0-2), Conor Cooney (0-2), Donal Cooney (0-1)		Fergal Healy (2-7, 1-6 frees), Thomas Monagan (0-5), Matthew Freaney (1-0), Shane Dolan (0-1)	Kenny Park, Athenry; Referee: John McDonagh

2 September 2018; 16:00; Round 3	Liam Mellows	0-19 - 0-19	Tommy Larkin's	Duggan Park, Ballinasloe
2 September 2018; 16:00; Round 3	Adrian Morrissey (0-15, 13 frees), Tadhg Haran (0-2, 1 free), Jack Hastings (0-1), Aonghus Callanan (0-1)		Jason Flynn (0-13, 12 frees), Brian McCormack (0-2), Kevin McHugo (0-2), Ronan Murphy (0-1), Conor Gardiner (0-1)	Duggan Park, Ballinasloe

2 September 2018; 17:45; Round 3	Castlegar	3-22 - 0-11	Kilnadeema-Leitrim	Duggan Park, Ballinasloe; Referee: Seamus Moran
2 September 2018; 17:45; Round 3	Ger Farragher (0-11, 9 frees), Enda Concannon (2-4), Kevin Keane (1-1), Dean Higgins (0-2), Aaron Tummon (0-1), Jack Coyne (0-1), Adam Mooney (0-1)		Brian Molloy (0-7, 5 frees), Mikey Lynch (0-3), Dylan Twolowai (0-1)	Duggan Park, Ballinasloe; Referee: Seamus Moran

15 September 2018; 17:30; Round 4	Castlegar	2-10 - 0-14	Craughwell	Kenny Park, Athenry; Referee: Derek Kelly
15 September 2018; 17:30; Round 4	Ger Farragher (0-8 frees), Enda Concannon (1-0), Kevin Keane (1-0), Sean Connolly (0-1), Dean Higgins (0-1)		Thomas Monaghan (0-6, 5 frees), Fergal Healy (0-3, 2 frees), Matthew Freaney (0-1), Shane Dolan (0-1), Jamie Ryan (0-1), Aidan Prendergast (0-1)	Kenny Park, Athenry; Referee: Derek Kelly

16 September 2018; 17:30; Round 4	St. Thomas'	0-23 - 0-14	Liam Mellows	Kenny Park, Athenry; Referee: Eoin Shaughnessy
16 September 2018; 17:30; Round 4	Darragh Burke (0-6, 3 frees), Conor Cooney (0-5), Eanna Burke (0-3), Brendan Farrell (0-3), Bernard Burke (0-3), David Burke (0-1), Fintan Burke (0-1), David Sherry (0-1)		Adrian Morrissey (0-10, 6 frees), David Collins (0-1 free), Conor Kavanagh (0-1), Mark Hughes (0-1), Jack Forde (0-1)	Kenny Park, Athenry; Referee: Eoin Shaughnessy

16 September 2018; 16:00; Round 4	Tommy Larkin's	0-20 - 2-14	Kilnadeema-Leitrim	Duggan Park, Ballinasloe; Referee: Michael Harverty
16 September 2018; 16:00; Round 4	Jason Flynn (0-12, 9 frees), Kevin McHugo (0-4), Colm Flynn (0-2), Cathal Tuohy (0-1), Ronan Murphy (0-1)		Brian Molloy (0-9, 7 frees, 1 sideline), Dylan Twolowai (0-3), Jack Kenny (1-0), Mark Lawless (1-0), Stephen Molloy (0-1), Mikey Lynch (0-1)	Duggan Park, Ballinasloe; Referee: Michael Harverty

29 September 2018; 15:30; Round 5	Liam Mellows	2-18 - 1-16	Kilnadeema-Leitrim	Kenny Park, Athenry; Referee: John McDonagh
29 September 2018; 15:30; Round 5	A Morrissey (0-7 frees), Conor Kavanagh (2-0), Kevin Lee (0-4), Tadhg Haran (0-3), David Collins (0-1), Jack Hastings (0-1), Enda Fallon (0-1), Conor Hynes (0-1)		Brian Molloy (0-8, 5 frees), Mikey Lynch (1-4), Darragh O' Donoghue (0-1), Mark Lawless (0-1), Dylan Towolawi (0-1), Liam Kelly (0-1)	Kenny Park, Athenry; Referee: John McDonagh

29 September 2018; 15:30; Round 5	St. Thomas'	1-19 - 0-13	Castlegar	Pearse Stadium; Referee: Paul Fahy
29 September 2018; 15:30; Round 5	Darragh Burke (0-6, 4 frees), Brendan Farrell (1-1), Eanna Burke (0-3), James Regan (0-2), Conor Cooney (0-2), Kenneth Burke (0-2), Fintan Burke (0-1), Damien Finnerty, Bernard Burke (0-1 free)		Ger Farragher (0-10, 8 frees), Mark Gill (0-1), Dean Higgins (0-1), Sean Connolly (0-1)	Pearse Stadium; Referee: Paul Fahy

30 September 2018; 12:00; Round 5	Tommy Larkin's	2-16 - 2-14	Craughwell	Loughrea; Referee: Christy Browne
30 September 2018; 12:00; Round 5	Jason Flynn (0-7, 5 frees), Ronan Murphy (1-2), Colm Flynn (0-4), Conor Gardiner (1-1), Kevin McHugo (0-1), David Hickey (0-1)		Thomas Monaghan (0-9, 8 frees), Fergal Healy (1-1), Stephen Hynes (1-0), James Greaney (0-2), Gerard O'Toole (0-1), Aidan Prendergast (0-1)	Loughrea; Referee: Christy Browne

==== Senior A - Group 2 ====
Pos	Team	Pld	W	D	L	SF	SA	Diff	Pts
1	Sarsfields	5	3	1	1	3-74	6-68	-3	7
2	Loughrea	5	3	0	2	5-76	4-76	3	6
3	Gort	5	3	0	2	3-95	3-79	16	6
4	Cappataggle	5	2	1	2	2-83	4-73	4	5
5	Mullagh	5	2	0	3	5-71	2-90	-10	4
6	Portumna	5	1	0	4	3-78	2-91	-10	2

7 April 2018; 17:45; Round 1	Loughrea	0-15 - 0-12	Mullagh	Duggan Park, Ballinasloe; Referee: Liam Gordon
7 April 2018; 17:45; Round 1	Jamie Ryan (0-6, 4 frees), Brian Keary (0-2), Joe Mooney (0-2), Gearoid Loughnane (0-2), Oisin Coyle (0-1), Johnny Coen (0-1), Sean Sweeney (0-1)	Report	Ronan Glennon (0-4, 3 frees), Davy Glennon (0-3), Padraig Kennedy (0-2 frees), Justin Gaynor (0-1), Finian Coone (0-1), Sean Hardiman (0-1)	Duggan Park, Ballinasloe; Referee: Liam Gordon

8 April 2018; 12:30; Round 1	Sarsfields	1-15 - 2-9	Portumna	Duggan Park, Ballinasloe; Referee: Paul Fahy
8 April 2018; 12:30; Round 1	Niall Morrissey (0-9, 7 frees), Alan Ward (1-1), Kevin Cooney (0-2), Ian Fox (0-1), Ivan Kenny (0-1)		Joe Canning (2-4, 4 frees), Ronan O'Meara (0-2), Gareth Heagney (0-1), Andy Smith (0-1), Kevin Hayes (0-1)	Duggan Park, Ballinasloe; Referee: Paul Fahy

8 April 2018; 14:15; Round 1	Gort	0-18 - 0-15	Cappataggle	Duggan Park, Ballinasloe; Referee: Peter Murphy
8 April 2018; 14:15; Round 1	Aiden Helebert (0-6, 2 frees), Richie Cummins (0-4), Keith Killilea (0-3, 1 free), Greg Lally (0-1 free), Andy Coen (0-1), Wayne Walsh (0-1), Albert Mullins (0-1), Kaelan Higgins (0-1)		Alan Dolan (0-9, 8 frees), Damien Joyce (0-2), Eanna Garvey (0-1), Dan Nevin (0-1), Donal Mannion (0-1), Ronan Garvey (0-1)	Duggan Park, Ballinasloe; Referee: Peter Murphy

21 April 2018; 16:30; Round 2	Portumna	0-21 - 0-17	Gort	Kenny Park, Athenry; Referee: Eoin Shaughnessy
21 April 2018; 16:30; Round 2	Joe Canning (0-12, 8 frees), Ronan O'Meara (0-8), Kevin Hayes (0-1)		Aiden Helebert (0-9, 8 frees), Greg Lally (0-2 frees), Richie Cummins (0-2), Aidan Harte (0-1), Sylvie Óg Linnane (0-1), Kaelan Higgins (0-1), Albert Mullins (0-1)	Kenny Park, Athenry; Referee: Eoin Shaughnessy

21 April 2018; 17:45; Round 2	Cappataggle	2-14 - 1-15	Loughrea	Duggan Park, Ballinasloe; Referee: Derek Kelly
21 April 2018; 17:45; Round 2	Ja Mannion (2-4), Alan Dolan (0-8, 7 frees), Donal Mannion (0-2)		Jamie Ryan (0-6, 4 frees, 1 sideline), Joe Mooney (1-1), Neil Keary (0-3), Brian Keary (0-2), Martin McManus (0-2), Sean Sweeney (0-1)	Duggan Park, Ballinasloe; Referee: Derek Kelly

22 April 2018; 12:15; Round 2	Sarsfields	0-15 - 1-7	Mullagh	Duggan Park, Ballinasloe; Referee: Sean Moran
22 April 2018; 12:15; Round 2	Niall Morrissey (0-6, 4 frees), Joseph Cooney (0-2), Noel Kelly (0-2), Ian Fox (0-2), Kevin Cooney (0-1), Alan Ward (0-1), Eric Kenny (0-1)		Justin Gaynor (1-1), Ronan Glennon (0-2), Kevin Briscoe (0-1), Sean Hardiman (0-1), Davy Glennon (0-1), Cathal Dervan (0-1 free)	Duggan Park, Ballinasloe; Referee: Sean Moran

1 September 2018; 17:45; Round 3	Mullagh	2-16 - 0-20	Cappataggle	Duggan Park, Ballinasloe; Referee: Liam Gordon
1 September 2018; 17:45; Round 3	Cathal Dervan (0-9, 6 frees), Sean Hardiman (1-4), Davy Glennon (0-3), Eoin Dolphin (1-0)		Alan Dolan (0-7, 3 frees), Dan Nevin (0-5, 2 frees), Donal Mannion (0-2), Ronan Garvey (0-2), Michael Garvey (0-1), Eanna Garvey (0-1), Ja Mannion (0-1), James Egan (0-1)	Duggan Park, Ballinasloe; Referee: Liam Gordon

2 September 2018; 16:00; Round 3	Gort	1-24 - 0-14	Sarsfields	Kenny Park, Athenry; Referee: Derek Kelly
2 September 2018; 16:00; Round 3	Aiden Helebert (0-6, 4 frees), Richie Cummins (0-5), Greg Lally (0-5, 4 frees), Aidan Harte (0-4), Kaelan Higgins (1-1), Albert Mullins (0-2), Jack Grealish (0-1)		Kevin Cooney (0-7, 1 sideline), Niall Morrissey (0-4 frees), Eric Kenny (0-1), Ian Fox (0-1), Noel Kelly (0-1)	Kenny Park, Athenry; Referee: Derek Kelly

2 September 2018; 17:45; Round 3	Loughrea	0-20 - 0-17	Portumna	Kenny Park, Athenry; Referee: Alan Kelly
2 September 2018; 17:45; Round 3	Jamie Ryan (0-10, 8 frees), Joe Mooney (0-5), Neil Keary (0-2), Gearoid Loughnane (0-1), Brian Mahony (0-1), Sean Sweeney (0-1 free)		Joe Canning (0-13, 9 frees), Damien Hayes (0-1), Ivan Canning (0-1), Ronan O Meara (0-1), Neil Conneely (0-1)	Kenny Park, Athenry; Referee: Alan Kelly

15 September 2018; 16:00; Round 4	Cappataggle	0-18 - 0-11	Portumna	Duggan Park, Ballinasloe; Referee: Peter Murphy
15 September 2018; 16:00; Round 4	Alan Dolan (0-12 frees), James Skehill (0-2 frees), Paul Claffey (0-1), Damien Joyce (0-1), Donal Mannion (0-1), Michael Garvey (0-1)		Joe Canning (0-5, 3 frees), Jack Canning (0-4, 3 frees), Leo Smith (0-1), Ronan O'Meara (0-1)	Duggan Park, Ballinasloe; Referee: Peter Murphy

15 September 2018; 16:00; Round 4	Gort	1-20 - 1-15	Mullagh	Kenny Park, Athenry; Referee: Gerry Donoghue
15 September 2018; 16:00; Round 4	Aiden Helebert (0-8, 7 frees), Aidan Harte (1-3), Richie Cummins (0-3), Greg Lally (0-2 frees), Albert Mullins (0-2), Jack Commins (0-2)		Cathal Dervan (1-11, 9 frees), Sean Hardiman (0-2, 1 free), Cathal Hardiman (0-1), Finian Coone (0-1)	Kenny Park, Athenry; Referee: Gerry Donoghue

15 September 2018; 17:30; Round 4	Sarsfields	1-17 - 2-12	Loughrea	Duggan Park, Ballinasloe; Referee: John McDonagh
15 September 2018; 17:30; Round 4	Niall Morrissey (0-9, 7 frees), Noel Kelly (1-2), Jeffery Lawless (0-2), Kevin Cooney (0-2), Alan Ward (0-1), Eric Kenny (0-1)		Jamie Ryan (0-7, 5 frees), Brian Keary (1-1), Johnny Coen (1-0 free), Brian Mahony (0-1), Joe Mooney (0-1), Tom Hoban (0-1), Gearoid Loughnane (0-1)	Duggan Park, Ballinasloe; Referee: John McDonagh

30 September 2018; 13:30; Round 5	Loughrea	2-14 - 1-16	Gort	Pearse Stadium; Referee: Shane Hynes
30 September 2018; 13:30; Round 5	Jamie Ryan (0-8, 6 frees), Martin McManus (1-1), Dylan Shaughnessy (0-3), Joe Mooney (1-0), Neil Keary (0-2)		Aiden Helebert (0-10, 9 frees), Michael Mullins (1-0), Jack Commins (0-2), Wayne Walsh (0-1), Pakie Lally (0-1), Albert Mullins (0-1), Kaelan Higgins (0-1)	Pearse Stadium; Referee: Shane Hynes

30 September 2018; 13:30; Round 5	Cappataggle	0-16 - 1-13	Sarsfields	Kenny Park, Athenry; Referee: Liam Gordon
30 September 2018; 13:30; Round 5	Alan Dolan (0-6, 5 frees), Dan Nevin (0-6, 2 frees, 1 sideline), James Egan (0-2), Alan Loughnane (0-1), Donal Mannion (0-1)		Niall Morrissey (0-11, 8 frees), Noel Kelly (1-1), Kevin Cooney (0-1)	Kenny Park, Athenry; Referee: Liam Gordon

30 September 2018; 13:30; Round 5	Mullagh	1-21 - 1-20	Portumna	Loughrea; Referee: Eoin Shaughnessy
30 September 2018; 13:30; Round 5	Cathal Dervan (1-10, 9 frees), Davy Glennon (0-5), Ronan Glennon (0-2), Justin Gaynor (0-2), Kevin Briscoe (0-1), Finian Coone (0-1)		Joe Canning (0-14, 10 frees), Ronan O'Meara (1-6)	Loughrea; Referee: Eoin Shaughnessy

==== Senior A - Relegation ====
13 October 2018; 14:30; Senior A - Relegation	Portumna	0-24 - 1-14	Craughwell	Duggan Park, Ballinasloe; Referee: Christy Browne
13 October 2018; 14:30; Senior A - Relegation	Joe Canning (0-13, 5 frees), Andy Smith (0-4), Ronan O'Meara (0-3, 1 free), Kevin Hayes (0-3), Damien Hayes (0-1)		Thomas Monaghan (0-5, 3 frees), Fergal Healy (1-3, 1-0 penalty, 2 frees), Adrian Cullinane (0-1), Gerard O'Toole (0-1), Niall Callanan (0-1), Stephen Hynes (0-1), Jamie Ryan (0-1), James Greaney (0-1)	Duggan Park, Ballinasloe; Referee: Christy Browne

13 October 2018; 16:00; Senior A - Relegation	Kilnadeema-Leitrim	0-14 - 0-12	Mullagh	Duggan Park, Ballinasloe; Referee: Shane Hynes
13 October 2018; 16:00; Senior A - Relegation	Brian Molloy (0-7, 5 frees), Ciaran O'Connor (0-2), Mikey Lynch (0-2), Jack Kenny (0-1), Dylan Towolowi (0-1), Mark Lawless (0-1)		Cathal Dervan (0-5 frees), Davy Glennon (0-3), Ronan Glennon (0-3 frees), Conor Hardiman (0-1)	Duggan Park, Ballinasloe; Referee: Shane Hynes

=== Senior B ===
Senior B consists of 12 teams divided into two groups of 6. The winners of each group qualify for the 2018 preliminary quarter finals and compete in the following year's Senior A competition. The four second and third placed teams play-off with the two winners also qualifying for the 2018 preliminary quarter finals.

==== Senior B - Group 1 ====
Pos	Team	Pld	W	D	L	SF	SA	Diff	Pts
1	Turloughmore	5	5	0	0	4-93	5-61	29	10
2	Clarinbridge	5	4	0	1	7-82	2-81	19	8
3	Killimordaly	5	2	1	2	5-82	4-75	10	5
4	Ballinderreen	5	2	0	3	8-59	4-76	-5	4
5	Ahascragh-Fohenagh	5	1	0	4	5-63	8-84	-30	2
6	Beagh	5	0	1	4	6-81	12-83	-23	1

8 April 2018; 14:15; Round 1	Turloughmore	0-15 - 1-8	Ballinderreen	Pearse Stadium; Referee: Michael Haverty
8 April 2018; 14:15; Round 1	Sean Loftus (0-5), Jamie Holland (0-4 frees), Sean Linnane (0-2), Daithí Burke (0-1), Daniel Loftus (0-1), Barry McDonagh (0-1), Conor Walsh (0-1 free)	Report	Kevin Lane (0-3 frees), Oisin Burke (1-1), Shane Coen (0-1 free), Shane Larkin (0-1), Sean Coen (0-1), Roy Lane (0-1)	Pearse Stadium; Referee: Michael Haverty

8 April 2018; 16:00; Round 1	Clarinbridge	1-20 - 0-21	Killimordaly	Kenny Park, Athenry; Referee: John McDonagh
8 April 2018; 16:00; Round 1	Evan Niland (0-12, 0-10f), Cian Salmon (1-1), Stephen Forde (0-3), Michael Daly (0-2), Mark Kennedy, Niall Armstrong (0-1)		Brian Burke (0-10, 9f), David Concannon, Tommy Madden, Eanna Ryan, Paul Creaven, Darragh Cooney (0-2), Paul Madden (0-1)	Kenny Park, Athenry; Referee: John McDonagh

8 April 2018; 17:00; Round 1	Ahascragh-Fohenagh	2-15 - 2-14	Beagh	Kinvara; Referee: Peter Campbell
8 April 2018; 17:00; Round 1	Cathal Mannion (0-7, 1f), Ronan Kelly (1-1), Stephen Smyth (0-4f), Sean Bleahane (0-3), Shane Connelly (1-0)		Kevin Keehan (0-5, 0-4f), Paraic Landers (1-2,1f), Joe Gantley (1-0), Ferdia Tuohey (0-2), Rory Gantley, Adrian Tuohey, Aidan Diviney, John Moylan, Evan Hunt (0-1)	Kinvara; Referee: Peter Campbell

21 April 2018; 17:45; Round 2	Clarinbridge	1-17 - 1-8	Ballinderreen	Pearse Stadium; Referee: Paul Fahy
21 April 2018; 17:45; Round 2	Evan Niland 0-13 (11f), Mark Kennedy 1-1, Michael Daly 0-2, Eoin Forde 0-1		Kevin Lane 0-4 (3f), Niall Coen 1-0, Roy Lane 0-2 (1f), Shane Larkin, David O Connor 0-1 each	Pearse Stadium; Referee: Paul Fahy

21 April 2018; 18:15; Round 2	Turloughmore	2-25 - 2-13	Beagh	Kenny Park, Athenry; Referee: Alan Kelly
21 April 2018; 18:15; Round 2	Jamie Holland (0-8f), Conor Shaughnessy (1-2), Sean Linnane (0-5), Barry McDonagh (1-1), Mark Murphy, Sean Loftus, Conor Walsh, Richard Doyle (0-2), Matthew Keating (0-1)		Kevin Keehan (1-8, 1-6f), Paraic Landers (1-0), Rory Gantley, Adrian Tuohey, Eoin Mahon, Joe Gantley, John Moylan (0-1)	Kenny Park, Athenry; Referee: Alan Kelly

22 April 2018; 17:45; Round 2	Killimordaly	1-20 - 1-7	Ahascragh-Fohenagh	Kenny Park, Athenry; Referee: Shane Hynes
22 April 2018; 17:45; Round 2	Brian Burke (0-8f), Brian Concannon (0-4), David Concannon, Tommy Madden (0-3), Alan Lawless (1-0), Iomar Creaven, Paul Creaven (0-1)		Sean Bleahane (1-1), Stephen Kelly (0-2), Paraic Mannion (0-1f), Finbar Donnelan, Cathal Mannion, Peter Birch (0-1)	Kenny Park, Athenry; Referee: Shane Hynes

1 September 2018; 16:00; Round 3	Clarinbridge	0-17 - 0-21	Turloughmore	Kenny Park, Athenry; Referee: Eoin Shaughnessy
1 September 2018; 16:00; Round 3	Evan Niland (0-9, 7f), Patrick Foley (0-4), Michael Daly (0-2, 1f), Mark Kennedy (0-1), TJ Brennan (0-1)		Jamie Holland (0-9, 8f), Sean Linnane (0-3), Sean Loftus (0-2), Matthew Keating (0-2), Kevin Hussey (0-1), Fergal Moore (0-1), Conor Walsh (0-1), Barry McDonagh (0-1), Daniel Loftus (0-1)	Kenny Park, Athenry; Referee: Eoin Shaughnessy

1 September 2018; 17:45; Round 3	Killimordaly	2-16 - 0-22	Beagh	Loughrea; Referee: Gerry Donoghue
1 September 2018; 17:45; Round 3	Brian Concannon (2-3), Paul Creaven (0-3), Brian Burke (0-3, 2f), Paul Madden (0-2), Eanna Ryan (0-1), Jack Fitzpatrick (0-1), David Concannon (0-1), Darragh Cooney (0-1), Tommy Madden (0-1)		Rory Gantly (0-12, 11f), Adrian Tuohy (0-4), Evan Hunt (0-4), Paraic Landers (0-1), Kevin Keehan (0-1)	Loughrea; Referee: Gerry Donoghue

2 September 2018; 17:45; Round 3	Ballinderreen	3-17 - 1-11	Ahascragh-Fohenagh	Loughrea; Referee: Peter Campbell
2 September 2018; 17:45; Round 3	Roy Lane (1-6, 1-0 Pen, 6f), David O Connor (1-4), Kevin Lane (1-1), Cathal Gill (0-3), Shane Larkin (0-2), Sean Coen (0-1)		Cathal Mannion (0-8, 6f), John Finnerty (1-1f), Sean Bleahene (0-2)	Loughrea; Referee: Peter Campbell

16 September 2018; 12:00; Round 4	Ballinderreen	2-14 - 1-16	Beagh	Pearse Stadium; Referee: John Keane
16 September 2018; 12:00; Round 4	Roy Lane (1-7, 1-7f), Kevin Lane (1-3, 2f), Shane Larkin (0-2), Kieran Ryan (0-2)		Rory Gantley (0-9, 9f), Joe Gantley (1-1), John Moylan (0-2), Adrian Tuohey (0-1), Eoin Mahon (0-1), Kevin Keehan (0-1), Brian McGuane (0-1)	Pearse Stadium; Referee: John Keane

16 September 2018; 3:30; Round 4	Turloughmore	1-14 - 1-8	Killimordaly	New Inn; Referee: John McDonagh
16 September 2018; 3:30; Round 4	Jamie Holland (0-6, 5f), Dara Joyce (1-2), Sean Linnane (0-4), Matthew Keating (0-1), Richard Doyle (0-1)		Paul Creaven (1-6, 4f), Brian Concannon 0-1, 1f), Paul Madden (0-1)	New Inn; Referee: John McDonagh

28 September 2018; 19:00; Round 5	Ballinderreen	1-12 - 1-17	Killimordaly	Duggan Park, Ballinasloe; Referee: Christy Browne
28 September 2018; 19:00; Round 5	Sean Coen (1-1), Niall Coen (0-3), Roy Lane (0-3, 2f), Kevin Lane (0-2, 2f), Kieran Ryan (0-1), Shane Larkin (0-1), Colm Meehan (0-1, 1f)		Brian Burke 1-12 (1-0 pen, 10f), Eanna Ryan (0-2), Jack Fitzpatrick (0-1), Tommy Madden (0-1), Paul Creaven (0-1)	Duggan Park, Ballinasloe; Referee: Christy Browne

29 September 2018; 15:30; Round 5	Turloughmore	1-18 - 1-15	Ahascragh-Fohenagh	Lougrhea; Referee: Peter Murphy
29 September 2018; 15:30; Round 5	Jamie Holland (0-9, 8f), Kevin Hussey (1-0), Conor Shaughnessy (0-3), Richard Doyle (0-2), Sean Loftus (0-1), Damien Holland (0-1), Sean Linnane (0-1), Dara Joyce (0-1)		Cathal Mannion (0-12, 9f), Darragh Glynn (1-0), Mark Kelly (0-2), Padraig Mannion (0-1)	Lougrhea; Referee: Peter Murphy

30 September 2018; 15:00; Round 5	Clarinbridge	4-13 - 1-16	Beagh	Kenny Park, Athenry; Referee: Gerry Donoghue
30 September 2018; 15:00; Round 5	Niall Armstrong (2-1), Enda Collins (0-5, 4f), Mark Kennedy (1-1), Andrew Monaghan (1-0), Sean Kilduff (0-3), Michael Daly (0-2), Stephen Forde (0-1)		Kevin Keehan (0-4, 2f), Rory Gantley (0-3), Paraic Landers (1-0), Adrian Tuohy (0-3), Joe Gantley (0-2), Adrian Diviney (0-1f), Tommy McKeown (0-1), John Moylan (0-1), Evan Hunt (0-1)	Kenny Park, Athenry; Referee: Gerry Donoghue

==== Senior B - Group 2 ====
Pos	Team	Pld	W	D	L	SF	SA	Diff	Pts
1	Tynagh-Abbey/Duniry	5	4	1	0	6-89	4-63	32	9
2	Athenry	5	3	0	2	6-71	2-69	14	6
3	Padraig Pearse's	5	3	0	2	4-74	1-65	18	6
4	Abbeyknockmoy	5	1	2	2	6-79	8-77	-14	4
5	Ardrahan	5	1	1	3	3-69	2-82	-10	3
6	Moycullen	5	0	2	3	4-67	12-83	-40	2

7 April 2018; 16:00; Round 1	Tynagh-Abbey/Duniry	2-14 - 1-14	Athenry	Duggan Park, Ballinasloe; Referee: Michael Conway
7 April 2018; 16:00; Round 1	Shane Moloney (1-10, 10f), Brendan Lynch (1-0), Johnny Conroy (0-2), Padraig Robinson (0-2)	Report	Ronan Hardiman (0-8, 7f), Cathal Keane (1-0), Cian Burke (0-3), Mark Hannon (0-1), Patrick Hannon (0-1), Martin Cullen (0-1)	Duggan Park, Ballinasloe; Referee: Michael Conway

7 April 2018; 16:00; Round 1	Padraig Pearse's	0-20 - 0-16	Ardrahan	Kenny Park, Athenry; Referee: Derek Kelly
7 April 2018; 16:00; Round 1	Emmet Ward (0-7, 6f), Thomas Flannery (0-4), Ronan Bellew (0-3), Cyrill Donnellan (0-2), Kerrill Hardiman (0-1), Sean Hardiman (0-1), Enda Cunniffe (0-1), Jimmy Gelston (0-1)		Maurice Callanan (0-5, 4f), Gerard Forde (0-3), Jasom Kennedy (0-3), Cianan Fahy (0-2f), Cian Walsh (0-2), Johnny Glynn (0-1)	Kenny Park, Athenry; Referee: Derek Kelly

7 April 2018; 17:45; Round 1	Abbeyknockmoy	2-14 - 2-14	Moycullen	Pearse Stadium; Referee: Conor Quinlan
7 April 2018; 17:45; Round 1	Paul Flaherty (2-7, 3f), Craig Kennedy (0-3), Eoin Blade (0-2), Damien Rooney (0-1), Danny Mullins (0-1)		Eanna Noone (0-6, 3f), Lairgnen McDermott (1-0), Anraoi Whyte (1-0), Danny Gleeson (0-2), Seamus Ó Conghaille (0-2), Shane Clancy (0-1), Kevin Donovan (0-1), Gary Bohan (0-1), Fionn Mac Donnacha (0-1)	Pearse Stadium; Referee: Conor Quinlan

22 April 2018; 12:15; Round 2	Moycullen	1-15 - 2-12	Ardrahan	Pearse Stadium; Referee: Conor Quinlan
22 April 2018; 12:15; Round 2	Eanna Noone (1-10, 1-0 pen, 9f), Danny Gleeson (0-3), Lairgnen McDermott (0-1), Fionn Mac Donnacha (0-1)		Maurice Callanan (1-7, 5f), Cian Walsh (0-5), Liam Forde (1-0), Gerard Forde (0-1)	Pearse Stadium; Referee: Conor Quinlan

22 April 2018; 14:00; Round 2	Tynagh-Abbey/Duniry	0-21 - 3-12	Abbeyknockmoy	Duggan Park, Ballinasloe; Referee: Liam Gordon
22 April 2018; 14:00; Round 2	Shane Moloney (0-14, 9f), Padraig Brehony (0-3), Johnny Conroy (0-2), Ben Moran (0-1), Padraig Robinson (0-1)		Paul Flaherty (0-6, 5f), Damien Rooney (1-0), Cathal Cooley (1-0), Fionnan Garvey (1-0), Brian Flaherty (0-2), Craig Kennedy (0-2), Coleman Maher (0-1), Colm Flaherty (0-1)	Duggan Park, Ballinasloe; Referee: Liam Gordon

22 April 2018; 16:00; Round 2	Athenry	0-15 - 0-8	Padraig Pearse's	Kenny Park, Athenry; Referee: Seamus Moran
22 April 2018; 16:00; Round 2	Ronan Hardiman (0-6, 4f), Patrick Hannon (0-6), Conor Burke (0-1), Martin Cullen (0-1), Noel Keogh (0-1)		Emmet Ward (0-5f), Kerrill Hardiman (0-1), Cyrill Donnellan (0-1), Ronan Bellew (0-1)	Kenny Park, Athenry; Referee: Seamus Moran

1 September 2018; 16:00; Round 3	Pádraig Pearse's	2-19 - 0-11	Abbeyknockmoy	Duggan Park, Ballinasloe; Referee: Christopher Browne
1 September 2018; 16:00; Round 3	Thomas Flannery (0-7f), Gareth Lally (1-1), Sean Hardiman (1-1), Conor Fahey (0-3), Ronan Bellew (0-2), James Gelston (0-1), Kerrill Hardiman (0-1)		Paul Flaherty (0-9, 6f), Brian Flaherty (0-1), Jason Joyce (0-1)	Duggan Park, Ballinasloe; Referee: Christopher Browne

1 September 2018; 17:45; Round 3	Tynagh-Abbey/Duniry	4-21 - 0-13	Moycullen	Pearse Stadium; Referee: Paul Fahy
1 September 2018; 17:45; Round 3	Shane Maloney (2-10, 6f), Padraig Brehony (1-2), Johnny Conroy (0-4), Thomas Gordon (1-0), Kevin Maloney (0-1), Gary McHugo (0-1), Micheal Dervan (0-1), Colm Larkin (0-1)		Eanna Noone (0-6, 4f), Niall Mannion (0-2), Conor Bohan (0-2), Christopher Hurney (0-1), Fionn McDonagh (0-1)	Pearse Stadium; Referee: Paul Fahy

2 September 2018; 13:45; Round 3	Athenry	0-11 - 0-16	Ardrahan	Gort; Referee: Peter Murphy
2 September 2018; 13:45; Round 3	Ronan Hardiman (0-7, 6f), Cian Burke (0-1), Patrick Hannon (0-1), Cillian Lawless (0-1), Aidan Higgins (0-1)		Maurice Callanan (0-5, 4f), Iarla Tannian (0-3), Cianan Fahy (0-2), Cian Walsh (0-2), Jason Kennedy (0-2), Liam Forde (0-2)	Gort; Referee: Peter Murphy

15 September 2018; 17:30; Round 4	Padraig Pearses	2-16 - 1-8	Moycullen	Pearse Stadium; Referee: Shane Hynes
15 September 2018; 17:30; Round 4	Emmet Ward (0-6, 4f), Thomas Flannery (1-2, 2f), Jimmy Gelston (0-3), Gareth Lally (0-3), Sean Hardiman (1-0), Shane Raftrey (0-1), Colm Raftrey (0-1)		Eanna Noone (1-5, 1-3f, 1 sl), Conor Bohan (0-1), Niall Mannion (0-1), Seamus Conneely (0-1)	Pearse Stadium; Referee: Shane Hynes

16 September 2018; 13:30; Round 4	Athenry	3-11 - 0-14	Abbeyknockmoy	Loughrea; Referee: Peter Campbell
16 September 2018; 13:30; Round 4	Cian Burke (1-3), Ronan Hardiman (0-5, 3f), Tom Flynn (1-0), Cillian Lawless (1-0), Cathal Keane (0-2), James Divilly (0-1)		Paul Flaherty (0-8, 7f), Eoin Blade (0-2), Brian Flaherty (0-1), Cathal Cooley (0-1), Craig Kennedy (0-1), Jason Joyce (0-1)	Loughrea; Referee: Peter Campbell

16 September 2018; 17:30; Round 4	Tynagh-Abbey/Duniry	0-18 - 0-13	Ardrahan	Duggan Park, Ballinasloe; Referee: Liam Gordon
16 September 2018; 17:30; Round 4	Shane Moloney (0-11, 6f), Johnny Conroy (0-4), Thomas Gordon (0-2), Micheal Dervan (0-1)		Maurice Callanan (0-5f), Stephen Whelan (0-3), Pearce McCrann (0-2), Liam Forde (0-2), Cianan Fahy (0-1)	Duggan Park, Ballinasloe; Referee: Liam Gordon

29 September 2018; 17:00; Round 5	Tynagh-Abbey/Duniry	0-15 - 0-11	Padraig Pearses	Loughrea; Referee: John Keane
29 September 2018; 17:00; Round 5	Shane Moloney (0-10, 8f), Colm Larkin (0-2), David Jordan (0-1), Thomas Gordon (0-1), Johnny Conroy (0-1)		Thomas Flannery (0-6f), Emmet Ward (0-2, 1f), Colm Raftery (0-1), Ronan O'Neill (0-1), Sean Hardiman (0-1)	Loughrea; Referee: John Keane

29 September 2018; 17:00; Round 5	Athenry	2-20 - 0-17	Moycullen	Pearse Stadium; Referee: Derek Kelly
29 September 2018; 17:00; Round 5	Ronan Hardiman (0-9, 7f), Cian Burke (1-3, 1-0 pen), Martin Cullen (1-0), Tom Flynn (0-2), Patrick Hannon (0-2), Cillian Lawless (0-2), Mark Hannon (0-1), Aidan Higgins (0-1)		Eanna Noone (0-10, 8f, 1sl), Seamus Conneeley (0-3), Danny Gleeson (0-2), Anraoi Whyte (0-1), Niall Mannion (0-1)	Pearse Stadium; Referee: Derek Kelly

29 September 2018; 17:00; Round 5	Abbeyknockmoy	1-18 - 1-12	Ardrahan	Kenny Park, Athenry; Referee: Seamus Moran
29 September 2018; 17:00; Round 5	Paul Flaherty (0-7, 5f), Eoin Blade (1-1), Brian Flaherty (0-3), Eoin Loftus (0-2), Craig Kennedy (0-2), Cathal Cooley (0-1), Paul Cooley (0-1), Fionnan Garvey (0-1)		Jason Kennedy (1-4, 3f), Cianan Fahy (0-2, 1f), Maurice Callanan (0-2f), Cian Walsh (0-2), Ross Albertini (0-2)	Kenny Park, Athenry; Referee: Seamus Moran

==== Senior B - playoffs ====
The second team in Senior B Group 1 plays the third team in Senior B Group 2 and the third team in Senior B Group 1 plays the second team in Senior B Group 2. The two winning teams qualify for the 2018 senior preliminary quarter finals. The two losing teams are eliminated from this year's senior championship.

7 October 2018; 14:00; Senior B Playoff	Killimordaly	0-15 - 0-12	Athenry	Kenny Park, Athenry; Referee: Paul Fahy
7 October 2018; 14:00; Senior B Playoff	Brian Burke (0-8, 5f), Paul Creaven (0-3), David Concannon (0-2), Brian Concannon (0-1), Eanna Ryan (0-1)		Ronan Hardiman (0-4f), Cillian Lawless (0-4, 1f), Cian Burke (0-2, 1f), Patrick Hannon (0-1), Noel Keogh (0-1)	Kenny Park, Athenry; Referee: Paul Fahy

7 October 2018; 15:45; Senior B Playoff	Clarinbridge	1-20 - 1-14; AET	Padraig Pearses	Kenny Park, Athenry; Referee: John McDonagh
7 October 2018; 15:45; Senior B Playoff	Evan Niland (0-13, 9f), Mark Kennedy (1-1), Michael Daly (0-2), Barry Daly (0-1), Sean Kilduff (0-1), Niall Armstrong (0-1), Stephen Forde (0-1)		Thomas Flannery (0-6, 5f), Conor Fahy (1-1), Gareth Lally (0-3), Sean Hardiman (0-2), Colm Rafferty (0-1), Ronan Bellew (0-1)	Kenny Park, Athenry; Referee: John McDonagh

==== Senior B - Relegation ====
The losing team is relegated to the following year's intermediate championship.

20 October 2018; 14:00; Senior B Relegation	Beagh	1-19 - 0-20	Moycullen	Loughrea; Referee: Liam Gordon
20 October 2018; 14:00; Senior B Relegation	Rory Gantley (0-11, 6f), Kevin Keehan (1-0), Tommy McKeown (0-2), Evan Hunt (0-2), Joe Gantley (0-2), John Moylan (0-2)	Report	Eanna Noone (0-11, 5f, 3sl), Anraoi Whyte (0-1), Seamus Conneely (0-2), Niall Mannion (0-2), Danny Gleeson (0-1), Gary Bohan (0-1), Fionn MacDonnacha (0-1)	Loughrea; Referee: Liam Gordon

== Senior Knockout stage ==
=== Senior Preliminary Quarter-finals ===
The four teams who finished third and fourth in the two Senior A Groups play the four Senior B teams who qualified (the two winners of the two Senior B Groups plus the two winners of the Senior B play-offs).

14 October 2018; 13:30; Preliminary Quarter-final	Castlegar	0-19 - 0-16	Killimaordaly	Pearse Stadium; Referee: John Keane
14 October 2018; 13:30; Preliminary Quarter-final	Ger Farragher (0-9, 7f), Enda Concannon (0-3), Kevin Keane (0-2), Donal McGreal (0-2), Mark Gill (0-1), Aaron Tummon (0-1), Oisin Connolly (0-1)		Brian Burke (0-12, 9f), Jack Fitzpatrick (0-1), Paul Creaven (0-1), Brian Concannon (0-1), Tommy Madden (0-1)	Pearse Stadium; Referee: John Keane

21 October 2018; 14:00; Preliminary Quarter-final	Clarinbridge	3-18 - 1-19	Gort	Kenny Park, Athenry; Referee: Gerry Donoghue
21 October 2018; 14:00; Preliminary Quarter-final	Evan Niland (0-10, 9f), Stephen Forde (1-2), Michael Daly (0-3, 2f), Cian Salmon (1-0), Mark Kennedy (1-0), Niall Armstrong (0-2), TJ Brennan (0-1)		Greg Lally (1-5, 1-0 pen, 4f), Aidan Harte (0-7, 3f), Richie Cummins (0-6, 3f), Paul Killilea (0-1)	Kenny Park, Athenry; Referee: Gerry Donoghue

14 October 2018; 15:30; Preliminary Quarter-final	Cappataggle	2-15 - 0-19 AET	Turloughmore	Kenny Park, Athenry; Referee: Eoin Shaughnessy
14 October 2018; 15:30; Preliminary Quarter-final	Alan Dolan (0-10, 6f), Jarlaith Mannion (1-0), Michael Garvey (1-0), David Malone (0-2), Dan Nevin (0-1f), Damien Joyce (0-1), Donal Mannion (0-1)		Conor Walsh (0-6, 4f), Jamie Holland (0-4, 3f), Sean Linnane (0-2), Daniel Loftus (0-2), Sean Loftus (0-1), Richard Doyle (0-1), Vincent Doyle (0-1), Barry McDonagh (0-1), Daithí Burke (0-1)	Kenny Park, Athenry; Referee: Eoin Shaughnessy

14 October 2018; 15:30; Preliminary Quarter-final	Tynagh-Abbey/Duniry	1-17 - 1-15	Tommy Larkin's	Duggan Park, Ballinasloe; Referee: Liam Gordon
14 October 2018; 15:30; Preliminary Quarter-final	Shane Maloney (0-10, 7f), Thomas Gordon (1-0), Padraig Brehony (0-3), Colm Larkin (0-2), Micheal Dervan (0-1), John Conroy (0-1)		Jason Flynn (0-8, 5f 1sl), David Hickey (1-1), Ronan Murphy (0-2), Conor Gardiner (0-2), Kevin McHugo (0-1), Kevin Hooban (0-1)	Duggan Park, Ballinasloe; Referee: Liam Gordon

=== Senior Quarter-finals ===
The four teams who finished first and second in the two Senior A groups play the four winners of the senior preliminary quarter finals.

20 October 2018; 15:30; Quarter-final	Sarsfields	1-12 - 0-13	Castlegar	Kenny Park, Athenry; Referee: Gerry Donoghue
20 October 2018; 15:30; Quarter-final	Kevin Cooney (1-2), Niall Morrissey (0-4f), Jeffery Lawless (0-3), Joseph Cooney (0-1), Peter English (0-1), Noel Kelly (0-1)	Report	Ger Farragher (0-7, 4f, 1sl), Oisin Connolly (0-2), Enda Concannon (0-2), Jack Coyne (0-1), Kevin Keane (0-1)	Kenny Park, Athenry; Referee: Gerry Donoghue

21 October 2018; 13:30; Quarter-final	Cappataggle	1-15 - 0-17	Loughrea	Duggan Park, Ballinasloe; Referee: John Keane
21 October 2018; 13:30; Quarter-final	Alan Dolan (0-9, 8f), Dan Nevin (0-5, 3f, 1sl) Donal Mannion (1-0), Jarlaith Mannion (0-1)	Report	Jamie Ryan (0-11, 8f), Dylan Shaughnessey (0-2), Sean O'Brien (0-2), Tom Huban (0-1), Martin McManus (0-1)	Duggan Park, Ballinasloe; Referee: John Keane

21 October 2018; 15:30; Quarter-final	Liam Mellows	2-16 - 0-16	Tynagh-Abbey/Duniry	Kenny Park, Athenry; Referee: Eoin Shaughnessy
21 October 2018; 15:30; Quarter-final	Tadhg Haran (0-7, 2f, 2sl), Conor Kavanagh (1-2), Enda Fallon (1-1), Aonghus Callanan (0-2), Kevin Lee (0-2), David Collins (0-1), David Fahy (0-1)	Report	Shane Moloney (0-8, 7f), Colm Larkin (0-3), Micheal Dervan (0-2), Gary McHugo (0-1), Thomas Gordon (0-1), Niall Moloney (0-1)	Kenny Park, Athenry; Referee: Eoin Shaughnessy

28 October 2018; 13:30; Quarter-final	St. Thomas's	1-23 - 2-19 (AET)	Clarinbridge	Kenny Park, Athenry; Referee: Paul Fahy
28 October 2018; 13:30; Quarter-final	Darragh Burke (0-8, 7f), Conor Cooney (1-5), Brendan Farrell (0-3), Fintan Burke (0-2, 1f), Eanna Burke (0-1), James Regan (0-1), Damien McGlynn (0-1), David Sherry (0-1), Kenneth Burke (0-1)	Report	Evan Niland (0-11, 9f), Mark Kennedy (1-1), Cian Salmon (1-0), Barry Daly (0-2), Sean Kilduff (0-2), Shane Ryan (0-1), Michael Daly (0-1), Patrick Foley (0-1)	Kenny Park, Athenry; Referee: Paul Fahy

=== Senior Semi-finals ===
4 November 2018; 13:00; Semi-final	St. Thomas'	2-19 - 0-20	Sarsfields	Kenny Park, Athenry; Referee: Christy Browne
4 November 2018; 13:00; Semi-final	Darragh Burke (1-7, 5f), Eanna Burke (0-5), Brendan Farrell (1-2), Shane Cooney (0-1), James Regan (0-1), David Burke (0-1), Conor Cooney (0-1), Kenneth Burke (0-1)	Report	Niall Morrissey (0-9, 8f), Kevin Cooney (0-3), Ian Fox (0-2), Alan Ward (0-2), Joseph Cooney (0-1), Noel Kelly (0-1), Eric Kenny (0-1), Kenneth Cooney (0-1)	Kenny Park, Athenry; Referee: Christy Browne

4 November 2018; 14:45; Semi-final	Liam Mellows	0-20 - 0-19	Cappataggle	Kenny Park, Athenry; Referee: Alan Kelly
4 November 2018; 14:45; Semi-final	Adrian Morrissey (0-8, 7f), Tadhg Haran (0-4, 1f), Aonghus Callanan (0-3), Conor Kavanagh (0-2), Jack Hastings (0-1), Conor Elwood (0-1), Jack Forde (0-1)	Report	Jarlath Mannion (0-5), Alan Dolan (0-4, 3f), Darragh Dolan (0-3), Dan Nevin (0-2f), Alan Loughnane (0-1), Damien Joyce (0-1), James Egan (0-1), Ronan Garvey (0-1), Donal Mannion (0-1)	Kenny Park, Athenry; Referee: Alan Kelly

=== Senior final ===
18 November 2018; 14:00; Final	St. Thomas'	2-13 - 0-10	Liam Mellows	Pearse Stadium; Attendance: 8,487; Referee: Liam Gordon
18 November 2018; 14:00; Final	Darragh Burke (1-7, 2f), Conor Cooney (1-1), Eanna Burke (0-3), David Burke (0-1), James Regan (0-1)	Report	Adrian Morrissey (0-6f), Tadhg Haran (0-1), Jack Forde (0-1), Kevin Lee (0-1), Conor Hynes (0-1)	Pearse Stadium; Attendance: 8,487; Referee: Liam Gordon

St. Thomas':
1	Gerald Murray
2	Cian Mahoney
3	Cathal Burke
4	David Sherry
7	Fintan Burke
6	Shane Cooney
5	Donal Cooney
11	David Burke
8	James Regan
14	Conor Cooney
10	Darragh Burke
15	Damien McGlynn
12	Bernard Burke
13	Brendan Farrell
9	Eanna Burke
Substitutes Used:
17	Kenneth Burke for Damien McGlynn (40 mins)
18	Cian Kelly for Bernard Burke (43 mins)
19	Mark Caulfield for Brendan Farrell (60 mins)
21	Sean Skehill for Donal Cooney (60 mins)
20	Damien Finnerty for Eanna Burke (62 mins)
Manager:
Kevin Lally

Liam Mellows:
1	Kenneth Walsh
7	Brian Leen
3	Sean Morrissey
2	Cathal Reilly
4	Mark Hughes
6	David Collins
5	Michael Conneely
8	Jack Hastings
9	Kevin Lee
13	Adrian Morrissey
11	Conor Hynes
14	Tadhg Haran
19	Enda Fallon
10	Conor Kavanagh
12	Aonghus Callanan
Substitutes Used:
15	Jack Forde for Adrian Morrissey (39 mins)
35	Ronan Elwood for Aonghus Callanan (39 mins)
25	Stephen Barrett for Enda Fallon (43 mins)
18	Conor Elwood for Kevin Lee (52 mins)
Manager:
Louis Mulqueen
