= Colin Coen =

Irish hurler

Personal information
- Native name: Cóilín Ó Comhghain (Irish)
- Born: Ballinderreen, County Galway, Ireland

Sport
- Sport: Hurling
- Position: Left corner-back
Club
- Years: Club
- 1996-2013: Ballinderreen
Club titles
- Galway titles: 0
Inter-county
Years	County	Apps (scores)
2005-2006	Galway	10 (0-00)
Inter-county titles
- All-Irelands: 0
- NHL: 0
- All Stars: 0

Colin Coen is an Irish hurler who played as a left corner-back for the Galway senior team.

Coen joined the team during the 2005 National League and was a regular member of the team for two seasons. An All-Ireland medalist win the minor grade, he enjoyed little success at senior level. He ended up as an All-Ireland Senior championship runner-up on one occasion.

At club level Coen plays with the Ballinderreen club, where he won a Galway Intermediate county final in 2000.
