= Tom Helebert =

Irish hurler and selector

Personal information
- Native name: Tomás Hoileabard. (Irish)
- Born: 1964 (age 61–62) Galway, Ireland
- Occupation: Director

Sport
- Sport: Hurling
- Position: Right half back
Club
- Years: Club
- Ballinderreen Gort
Inter-county
- Years: County
- 1989-1996: Galway
Inter-county titles
- NHL: 1
- All Stars: 1

Thomas Helebert (born 1964) is an Irish former hurler and former selector of the Galway senior hurling management team, who played as a right wing-back for the Galway senior team.

Helebert joined the team in 1989 and was a regular member of the starting fifteen until his retirement in 1996. He has won one National League winners' medal and one All-Star award. He ended up as an All-Ireland runner-up in 1993. In 1996 he received an All Star Award. At club level Helebert played with Ballinderreen, and later Gort.

Helebert was on the Galway management team, having helped revamp the team and bring them to an All Ireland final in 2012. He coached Clarenbridge alongside manager Michael Donoghue, and guided them to AI Club Final success on St. Patricks Day 2011. He later went on to manage South Galway clubs Ardrahan & Craughwell.
