= Ballinderreen GAA =

Gaelic sports club in County Galway, Ireland

Ballinderreen
- Baile an Doirín
- Founded: 1884
- County: Galway
- Colours: Green and White
- Grounds: St. Sourney's GAA Grounds

Playing kits
Standard colours

Ballinderreen GAA is a Gaelic Athletic Association club based in Ballinderreen, County Galway, Ireland. The club was founded in 1884. The parish already was deeply rooted in hurling before the foundation of the GAA.

The club is situated in South Galway, in the parish of Ballinderreen. The club has produced a number of inter-county hurlers throughout the years, several of whom have gone on to win All Ireland medals with Galway.

== History ==
The club has little success in terms of senior championship silverware, but it has been successful in juvenile age groups, winning several underage championships.

The club's senior team last advanced as far as the Galway Senior Hurling Championship county final in 1978, with Noel Lane in the attack. They met Ardrahan in the decider. The game was held in Ballinasloe, with the game eventually ending in a draw on a scoreline of Ballinderreen 0–16, Ardrahan 2–10. The replay was held later, with Ardrahan winning their 11th title after extra time on a scoreline of Ardrahan 2-18 Ballinderreen 2–14.

On 21 August 1991, Ballinderreen hosted a 1991–92 European Cup Winners' Cup match between Galway United F.C. and Odense BK.

In 2000, the Ballinderreen team won the Galway Intermediate Hurling championship, beating Kiltormer in the final by 1–8 to 0–4. They returned to the senior championship after only one year in intermediate.

In 2011, the club's Junior B team won the Leinster Junior B Club hurling championship, becoming the first ever Galway team to win a Leinster championship. They reached the All-Ireland Junior B Club Hurling Championship final. They defeated Thurles Sarsfields in the semi-final before meeting Doneraile GAA in the final. They went on to win 2–6 to 0–5.

== Notable players ==
- Noel Lane
- Mick Gill – Galway All Ireland winner 1923
- Colin Coen – Galway Senior hurler 2005–2006
- Joe McDonagh – Galway Senior hurler 1972–1983; President of the GAA 1997–2000
- Tom Helebert – Galway Senior hurler 1989–1997

== Honours ==
- Galway Intermediate Hurling Championship (3)
  - 2000, 2017, 2023
- Galway Intermediate Hurling Championship runners up (1)
  - 2016
- Galway Senior Hurling Championship runners up (2)
  - 1935, 1978
- South Galway Senior Hurling Championship (14)
  - 1933, 1934, 1935, 1936, 1937, 1938, 1939, 1944, 1957, 1960, 1965, 1966, 1972, 1974
- South Galway Board Junior Hurling Championship (3)
  - 1929, 1930, 1942
- Galway Under-21 Hurling South Championship (1)
  - 1972
- Galway Junior B Hurling Championship (3)
  - 1942, 1996, 2018
- Galway Under-21 B Hurling Championship (3)
  - 1999
  - 2021, 2022 (Under 20)
- Galway Minor Hurling Championship (4)
  - (B) 1987, 2023
  - (C) 1997, 2015
- Leinster Junior B Club Hurling Championship (1)
  - 2011
- All-Ireland Junior B Club Hurling Championship (1)
  - 2011
