= Conor Hayes =

Galway hurler

Personal information
- Native name: Conchur Ó hAodha (Irish)
- Born: 11 May 1958 (age 68) Kiltormer, County Galway, Ireland
- Occupation: Engineer
- Height: 6 ft 0 in (183 cm)

Sport
- Sport: Hurling
- Position: Full-back
Clubs
- Years: Club
- Kiltormer; Glen Rovers
Club titles
- Galway titles: 3
- Connacht titles: 2
- All-Ireland Titles: 1
Inter-county*
Years	County	Apps (scores)
1979–1989	Galway	23 (0–00)
Inter-county titles
- All-Irelands: 3
- NHL: 2
- All Stars: 3
- *Inter County team apps and scores correct as of 18:04, 27 January 2013.

Conor Hayes (born 11 May 1958) is an Irish former hurler who played as a full-back at senior level for the Galway county team.

Born in Kiltormer, County Galway, Hayes first played competitive hurling in his youth. He made his first impression on the inter-county scene at the age of twenty he joined the Galway under-21 team. He made his senior debut during the 1979 championship. Hayes went on to play a key role for Galway for over a decade, and won three All-Ireland medals and two National Hurling League medals. A two-time All-Ireland-winning captain, Hayes was an All-Ireland runner-up on three occasions.

As a member of the Connacht inter-provincial team for almost a decade, Hayes won four Railway Cup medal. At club level he is a one-time All-Ireland medallist with Kiltormer. In addition to this he also won two Connacht medals and three championship medals. Hayes also lined out with Glen Rovers.

Throughout his career Hayes made 23 championship appearances for Galway. His retirement came following the conclusion of the 1990 championship.

Hayes is widely regarded as one of Galway's greatest-ever club and inter-county hurlers. He has often been voted onto teams made up of the sport's greats, including at full-back on the Galway Hurling Team of the Millennium and on the All-Ireland Club Hurling Silver Jubilee Team.

In retirement from playing, Hayes became involved in team management and coaching. During a four-year term as manager of the Galway senior hurlers, he guided the team to an All-Ireland final appearance.

== Playing career ==
He won a Fitzgibbon Cup with University College Galway in 1977.

=== Club ===
Hayes joined the Kiltormer senior team as a non-playing sub in 1976, before making his championship debut the following year. He won his first championship medal that year following a 3–10 to 3–8 defeat of Athenry.

In 1982 Hayes missed out on Kiltormer's next championship success, as he spent the year playing with Glen Rovers in Cork.

Hayes was back with Kiltormer by 1990 when the club reached the club decider once again. An 0–18 to 2–7 defeat of Turloughmore gave him his second championship medal. He later won his first Connacht medal following a 5–11 to 0–6 trouncing of Oran.

Kiltormer retained their Galway title in 1991, with Hayes winning a third and final championship medal following a 3–9 to 0–15 defeat of Athenry. He later added a second Connacht medal to his collection following a 2–9 to 1–6 defeat of Four Roads. On 29 March 1992 Hayes lined out with Kiltormer against Birr in the All-Ireland final. A 0–15 to 1–8 victory gave him an All-Ireland Senior Club Hurling Championship medal.

=== Inter-county ===
Hayes first came to prominence on the inter-county scene as a member of the Galway under-21 hurling team that reached the All-Ireland decider in 1978. Tipperary provided the opposition on that occasion, however, the game ended in a draw. At the second time of asking Galway emerged victorious by 3–15 to 2–8 and Hayes collected an All-Ireland Under-21 Hurling Championship medal.

In 1979 Hayes was appointed captain of the Galway under-21 team. That year his side qualified for the All-Ireland final once again and, for the second consecutive year, Tipperary were the opponents. On this occasion Tipperary made no mistake and defeated Hayes's team by 2–12 to 1–9.

Hayes made his senior championship debut with Galway on 1 July 1979 in a 1–23 to 3–10 defeat of Laois. Galway later shocked four-in-a-row hopefuls Cork in the All-Ireland semi-final and qualified for an All-Ireland final showdown with Kilkenny. In one of the worst All-Ireland finals of the decade, Galway goalkeeper Séamus Shinnors had an absolute nightmare of a game. A 70-yards free by Liam "Chunky" O'Brien after just four minutes dipped, hit off Shinnors and ended up in the Galway net. Galway fought back and went two points up twelve minutes into the second half, however, they failed to score for the rest of the game. Four minutes before the end of the game another long-range free for Kilkenny ended up in the net behind Shinnors. It was a score which summed up the day for Hayes's side as Kilkenny went on to win by 2–12 to 1–8.

In 1980 Galway defeated Kildare and Offaly to reach a second consecutive All-Ireland final. Munster champions Limerick provided the opposition on this occasion and an exciting championship decider followed. Bernie Forde and P. J. Molloy goals for Galway meant that the men from the west led by 2–7 to 1–5 at half-time. Éamonn Cregan single-handedly launched the Limerick counter-attack in the second-half. Over the course of the game he scored 2–7, including an overhead goal and a point in which he showed the ball to Hayes and nonchalantly drove the ball over the bar. It was not enough to stem the tide and Galway went on to win the game by 2–15 to 3–9. It was Galway's first All-Ireland title since 1923, with Hayes picking up a winners' medal and the celebrations surpassed anything ever seen in Croke Park.

After missing the 1981 All-Ireland final, Hayes was restored to his usual full-back position by the time Galway reached the decider once again in 1985. Offaly provided the opposition in the subsequent All-Ireland final and another tense game ensued. Once again it was Offaly's goal-scoring ability that proved crucial. Pat Cleary scored the first of the day after twenty-five minutes of play and got his second less than half a minute after the restart. Joe Dooley had a goal disallowed halfway through the second-half while a long Joe Cooney effort, which seemed to cross the goal line, was not given. P. J. Molloy was Galway's goal scorer, however, the day belonged to Offaly. A 2–11 to 1–12 score line resulted in defeat for Galway.

Galway reached a second successive All-Ireland decider again in 1986. The men from the west were the red-hot favourites against an ageing Cork team, however, on the day a different story unfolded. Four Cork goals, one from John Fenton, two from Tomás Mulcahy and one from Kevin Hennessy, stymied the Galway attack and helped "the Rebels" to a 4–13 to 2–15 victory. In spite of the defeat Hayes was later presented with a first All-Star award.

In 1987 Hayes was appointed captain of the Galway team. The year began well when he led the team to their first National Hurling League title in over a decade following a 3–12 to 3–10 defeat of Clare. Later that summer Galway qualified for a third All-Ireland final in-a-row. The prospect of becoming the first team to lose three consecutive championship deciders weighed heavily on the Galway team as Kilkenny provided the opposition. The game was not a classic by any standard and Noel Lane got a key goal for Galway nine minutes before the end. A 1–12 to 0–9 victory gave Hayes a second All-Ireland medal while he also had the honour of accepting the Liam MacCarthy Cup. A second All-Star award quickly followed.

In 1988 Hayes was captain of the team for a second year. That year Galway reached a fourth successive All-Ireland final. After more than a decade-and-a-half in the wilderness Tipperary were back providing the opposition in the championship decider. Galway defeated Tipp in the semi-final the previous year, however, with an extra year's experience it was expected that Tipperary might shade the victory. Galway used this to motivate themselves. Noel Lane again scored the crucial goal for Galway while Nicky English sent a late penalty over the bar for a point. A 1–15 to 0–14 score line resulted in victory for Galway and a third All-Ireland medal for Hayes. Another solid performance at full-back resulted in a third successive All-Star award for the Galway captain.

In 1989 Hayes was once again captain of the team as Galway went in search of a third All-Ireland title in-a-row. For the third time in as many years Tipperary faced Galway in the All-Ireland series, however, on this occasion the men from the West were controversially without their star player Tony Keady. The game turned out to be a tense and unsavory affair as Tipp finally triumphed over Galway. A 1–17 to 2–11 victory for the Munster men meant that Galway's three-in-a-row dream was over.

Hayes played his last game for Galway in an All-Ireland quarter-final defeat of London in 1990. He was listed as a substitute for the subsequent All-Ireland decider against Cork. Shortly after half-time the westerners were up by seven points and were cruising to victory. Cork were a changed team in the second half and secured a 5–15 to 2–21 victory. This defeat brought the curtain down on Hayes's inter-county career.

=== Inter-provincial ===
Hayes also lined out with Connacht in the inter-provincial series of games and enjoyed much success.

In 1979 Hayes was at centre-back as Connacht reached the inter-provincial decider. A 1–13 to 1–9 defeat by Leinster was the result on that occasion. Hayes was moved to full-back in 1980 as Connacht faced Railway Cup specialists Munster in the decider. A low-scoring game followed, however, a 1–5 to 0–7 victory gave Connacht their first Railway Cup title since 1947. It was Hayes's first winners' medal in the competition.

Connacht reached the Railway Cup final again in 1983. A 0–10 to 1–5 victory gave Hayes his second Railway Cup medal, while the province retained the title for the first time in their history.

After defeat to Munster in 1985, both sides renewed their rivalry in the inter-provincial decider again in 1986. A comprehensive 3–11 to 0–11 victory gave Hayes a third Railway Cup medal.

In 1987 Hayes was captain of the Connacht team that faced Leinster in the final. A narrow 2–14 to 1–14 victory to Connacht. It was a fourth and final Railway Cup medal for Hayes, while he also had the honour of lifting the cup.

== Managerial career ==
Conor Hayes
Sport
Inter-county management
- Years: Team
- 2002–2006: Galway
Inter-county titles as manager
County	League	Province	All-Ireland
Galway	0	0	0

=== Galway ===
On 11 December 2002, Hayes defeated incumbent Noel Lane, Brendan Lynskey and Gerry Fahy in a vote to become manager of the Galway senior hurling team. His first season in charge in 2003 was fruitless as Galway were out of contention very early for the National League exited the championship without reaching Croke Park.

In 2004 Hayes secured his first silverware as manager. A 2–15 to 1–13 defeat of Waterford gave Galway the National Hurling League title. The subsequent championship campaign was once again unkind to Galway, who exited at an early stage. Hayes's two-year tenure as manager effectively ended following this defeat. A seven-man sub-committee of the Galway County Board later recommended Mattie Murphy for the job, however, Murphy withdrew his candidacy when club delegates voted 27–20 against his ratification as manager. Another candidate failed to emerge and Hayes was re-appointed for another year as manager.

Following his reappointment as manager Hayes was under pressure to deliver. An unconvincing league campaign resulted in many expecting little of Galway in the subsequent championship campaign. A surprise 2–20 to 2–18 defeat of Tipperary in the All-Ireland quarter-final set up an All-Ireland semi-final meeting with Kilkenny. "The Cats" got off to a great start, however, the young Galway team fought back and exposed a poor defence to produce one of the games of the decade. A 5–18 to 4–18 victory gave Galway a place in the All-Ireland final against Cork. It was their first meeting at this stage of the championship since Hayes was an unused substitute in 1990. Cork's Ben O'Connor scored a goal in the sixteenth minute that gave his team a comfortable lead. Damien Hayes fought back with a Galway goal in the fiftieth minute, reducing Cork's lead to a point. Galway fell flat and didn't score in the last ten minutes as Cork won by 1–21 to 1–16.

Hayes was persuaded to stay on as manager for another year, in the hope that his Galway team could go one better and claim the All-Ireland crown. After little success in the National League, Hayes's side exited the championship following a 2–22 to 3–14 defeat by Kilkenny in the All-Ireland quarter-final.

== Honours ==
=== Player ===
Kiltormer

- All-Ireland Senior Club Hurling Championship (1): 1992
- Connacht Senior Club Hurling Championship (2): 1990, 1991
- Galway Senior Club Hurling Championship (3): 1977, 1990, 1991

Galway

- All-Ireland Senior Hurling Championship (3): 1980, 1987 (c), 1988 (c)
- National Hurling League (2): 1986–87 (c), 1988–89 (c)

Connacht

- Railway Cup (4): 1980, 1983, 1986, 1987 (c)

=== Manager ===
Galway

- National Hurling League (1): 2004

=== Individual ===
Awards

- All-Star (3): 1986, 1987, 1988

Sporting positions
Preceded by Noel Lane	Galway Senior Hurling Captain; 1987–1989	Succeeded by Joe Cooney
Preceded by Noel Lane	Galway Senior Hurling Manager; 2002–2006	Succeeded by Ger Loughnane
Achievements
Preceded by Noel Lane (Connacht)	Railway Cup Hurling Final winning captain 1987	Succeeded by Aidan Fogarty (Leinster)
Preceded by Tom Cashman (Cork)	All-Ireland Senior Hurling Final winning captain 1987–1988	Succeeded by Bobby Ryan (Tipperary)
