= 1988 All-Ireland Senior Hurling Championship =

Championship details
- Dates: 22 May – 4 September 1988
- Teams: 15

All-Ireland champions
- Winning team: Galway (4th win)
- Captain: Conor Hayes
- Manager: Cyril Farrell

All-Ireland Finalists
- Losing team: Tipperary
- Captain: Nicky English
- Manager: Michael "Babs" Keating

Provincial champions
- Munster: Tipperary
- Leinster: Offaly
- Ulster: Antrim
- Connacht: Not Played

Championship statistics
- No. matches played: 14
- Top Scorer: Nicky English (1–22)
- Player of the Year: Tony Keady
- All-Star Team: See here

The 1988 All-Ireland Senior Hurling Championship was the 102nd staging of the All-Ireland Senior Hurling Championship, the Gaelic Athletic Association's premier inter-county hurling tournament. The championship began on 22 May 1988 and ended on 4 September 1988.

Galway were the defending champions.

On 4 September 1988, Galway won the championship following a 1–15 to 0–14 defeat of Tipperary in the All-Ireland final. This was their 4th All-Ireland title overall and their second in succession.

Tipperary's Nicky English was the championship's top scorer with 1–22. Galway's Tony Keady was the choice for Hurler of the Year.

== Teams ==
=== Overview ===
A total of fifteen teams contested the championship. Twelve of these teams played in the respective Leinster and Munster Championships. Antrim and Galway, who faced no competition in their respective provinces, were given byes to the All-Ireland Championship. London entered the championship at the All-Ireland quarter-final stage as a result of winning the All-Ireland B Championship.

=== General information ===
Fifteen counties will compete in the All-Ireland Senior Hurling Championship: one team from the Connacht Senior Hurling Championship, six teams in the Leinster Senior Hurling Championship, six teams in the Munster Senior Hurling Championship, one team from the Ulster Senior Hurling Championship and one team from the All-Ireland Senior B Hurling Championship.

County	Last provincial title	Last championship title	Position in 1987 Championship	Current championship
Antrim	1946	—		Ulster Senior Hurling Championship
Clare	1932	1914		Munster Senior Hurling Championship
Cork	1986	1986		Munster Senior Hurling Championship
Dublin	1961	1938		Leinster Senior Hurling Championship
Galway	1922	1987		Connacht Senior Hurling Championship
London	—	1901		All-Ireland Senior B Hurling Championship
Kerry	1891	1891		Munster Senior Hurling Championship
Kilkenny	1987	1983		Leinster Senior Hurling Championship
Laois	1949	1915		Leinster Senior Hurling Championship
Limerick	1981	1973		Munster Senior Hurling Championship
Offaly	1985	1985		Leinster Senior Hurling Championship
Tipperary	1987	1971		Munster Senior Hurling Championship
Waterford	1963	1959		Munster Senior Hurling Championship
Westmeath	—	—		Leinster Senior Hurling Championship
Wexford	1977	1968		Leinster Senior Hurling Championship

=== Stadia and locations ===
Team	Grounds
Antrim	Casement Park
Clare	Cusack Park
Cork	Páirc Uí Chaoimh
Dublin	Parnell Park
Galway	Pearse Stadium
Kerry	Fitzgerald Stadium
Kilkenny	Nowlan Park
Laois	O'Moore Park
Limerick	Gaelic Grounds
London	Emerald GAA Grounds
Offaly	St. Brendan's Park
Tipperary	Semple Stadium
Waterford	Walsh Park
Westmeath	Cusack Park
Wexford	Wexford Park

== Provincial championships ==
=== Leinster Senior Hurling Championship ===
29 May 1988 First round	Dublin	1–14 – 1–09	Westmeath	Nowlan Park, Kilkenny
	B McMahon 1–2, J Twomey 0–4, J Morris 0–3, S Dalton 0–2, V Murphy 0–2, C Hetherton 0–1.		D Kilcoyne 1–1, M Kilcoyne 0–2, D McCormack 0–2, M Hickey 0–2, M Newman 0–1, P Clancy 0–1.	Referee: P Delaney (Laois)

29 May 1988 First round	Wexford	3–10 – 1–08	Laois	Nowlan Park, Kilkenny
	John O'Connor 1–4, J Holohan 0–5, James O'Connor 1–0, R Murphy 1–0.		P Begin 1–0, M O'Sullivan 0–3, E Fennelly 0–3, PJ Cuddy 0–1, A Dunne 0–1.	Referee: P Long (Kilkenny)

Semi-finals

19 June 1988 >Semi-final	Wexford	4–12 – 2–16	Kilkenny	Croke Park, Dublin
	M Quigley 2–2, J Holohan 1–4, T Dempsey 1–1, John O'Connor 0–1, Furlong 0–1, B Byrne 0–1, E Sinnott 0–1, S Fitzhenry 0–1.		L Ryan 1–1, J Mulcahy 1–1, R Heffernan 0–4, H Ryan 0–4, M Cleere 0–4, L Fennelly 0–1, M Phelan 0–1.

19 June 1988 Semi-final	Offaly	2–13 – 2–10	Dublin	Croke Park, Dublin
	M Corrigan 0–7, D Fogarty 1–0, J Dooley 1–0, B Keeshan 0–3, M Duignan 0–2, E Coughlan 0–1.		J Twomey 1–3, B McMahon 1–1, S McDermott 0–3, J Morris 0–2, R Doherty 0–1.	Referee: J Henry (Westmeath)

Final

10 July 1988 Final	Offaly	3–12 – 1–14	Wexford	Croke Park, Dublin
	M Corrigan 1–5, J Dooley 2–0, B Keeshan 0–4, P O'Connor 0–1, V Teehan 0–1, P Delaney 0–1.		J Holohan 1–6, John O'Connor 0–3, James O'Connor 0–3, S Fitzhenry 0–1, G O'Connor 0–1.	Attendance: 28,234; Referee: P Long (Kilkenny)

=== Munster Senior Hurling Championship ===
First round

22 May 1988 First round	Limerick	6–14 – 1–09	Kerry	FitzGerald Park, Kilmallock
	P McCarthy 2–2, P Creamer 2–0, S Fitzgibbon 1–1, M Nelligan 1–0, G Kirby 0–3, O O'Connor 0–3, G Ryan 0–1, G Hegarty 0–1, R Sampson 0–1, B Finn 0–1, M Holohan 0–1.		J Hennessy 0–8, E. Murphy 1–1.	Attendance: W Barrett (Tipperary)

22 May 1988	Clare	3–12 – 3–10	Waterford	Semple Stadium, Thurles
First round	V Donnellan 0–7, T Guilfoyle 2–0, D Ryan 1–0, G McInerney 0–1, G O'Loughlin 0–1, J Russell 0–1, J Shanhan 0–1, A Cunningham 0–1.		P Ryan 1–1, A Ahearne 1–0, P Bennett 1–0, K Delahunty 0–3, P Murphy 0–2, C Curley 0–2, M Walsh 0–1, N Crowley 0–1.	Attendance: 7,072; Referee: T Murray (Limerick)

Semi-finals

5 June 1988 Semi-final	Tipperary	0–15 – 0–08	Limerick	Páirc Uí Chaoimh, Cork
	P Fox 0–7, J Hayes 0–2, P O'Neill 0–2, D Ryan 0–1, A Ryan 0–1, J Kennedy 0–1, C Bonnar 0–1.		G Kirby 0–4, B Finn 0–2, P McCarthy 0–1, O O'Connor 0–1.	Attendance: 32,084; Referee: W Horgan (Cork)

19 June 1988 Semi-final	Cork	3–22 – 2–09	Clare	Semple Stadium, Thurles
	P Horgan 1–6, M Mullins 1–5, T O'Sullivan 0–8, G FitzGerald 1–3.		G McInerney 1–3, D Ryan 1–0, V Donnellan 0–3, G O'Loughlin 0–1, V O'Loughlin 0–1.	Attendance: 17,244; Referee: J Moore (Waterford)

Final

17 July 1988 Final	Tipperary	2–19 – 1–13	Cork	Gaelic Grounds, Limerick
	N English 0–9, D Ryan 1–1, Cormac Bonbnar 1–0, P Delaney 0–3, J Hayes 0–2, D O'Connell 0–2, A Ryan 0–2.		P Horgan 1–4, T O'Sullivan 0–5, P O'Connor 0–2, G FitzGerald 0–1, T McCarthy 0–1.	Attendance: 50,000; Referee: T Murray (Limerick)

== All-Ireland Senior Hurling Championship ==
=== All-Ireland quarter-finals ===
16 July 1988 Quarter-final	Galway	4–30 – 2–08	London	Kenny Park, Athenry
	J Cooney 1–7, M McGrath 1–4, M Naughton 0–7, A Cunningham 1–2, É Ryan 0–5, N Lane 1–1, T Monaghan 0–2, T Keady 0–1, P Malone 0–1.		C Spain 1–1, P Butler 1–0, D McKenna 0–2, J O'DOnoghue 0–2, P O'Shea 0–1, K Morrissey 0–1, M Connelly 0–1.	Referee: P Delaney (Laois)

=== All-Ireland semi-finals ===
7 August 1988 Semi-final	Tipperary	3–15 – 2–10	Antrim	Croke Park, Dublin
	N English 1–7, P Fox 2–1, A Ryan 0–2, P Delaney 0–2, P O'Neill 0–1, J Hayes 0–1, D Ryan 0–1.		O McFetridge 1–5, F McAllister 1–0, B Donnelly 0–2, D Donnelly 0–1, B Laverty 0–1, P McKillen 0–1.	Attendance: 37,954; Referee: J Denton (Wexford)

7 August 1988 Semi-final	Galway	3–18 – 3–11	Offaly	Croke Park, Dublin
	M Naughton 1–5, N Lane 1–4, J Cooney 0–4, E Ryan 1–0, M McGrath 0–3, A Cunningham 0–1, T Keady 0–1.		M Corrigan 1–6, P Delaney 2–0, V Teehan 0–2, B Keeshan 0–2, M Duignan 0–1.	Attendance: 37,954; Referee: J Moore (Waterford)

=== All-Ireland Final ===
4 September 1988 Final	Galway	1–15 – 0–14	Tipperary	Croke Park, Dublin
	N Lane 1–0, P Malone 0–3, M Naughton 0–2, M McGrath 0–2, T Keady 0–2, G McInerney 0–2, J Cooney 0–1, E Ryan 0–1, B Lynskey 0–1, C Hayes 0–1.		N English 0–6, D Ryan 0–4, D O'Connell 0–2, A Ryan 0–1, P Delaney 0–1.	Attendance: 63,545; Referee: G Kirwan (Offaly)

== Championship statistics ==
=== Top scorers ===
Top scorers overall

Rank	Player	Team	Tally	Total	Matches	Average
1	Nicky English	Tipperary	1–22	25	3	8.33
2	Mark Corrigan	Offaly	2–18	24	3	8.00
3	Jimmy Holohan	Wexford	2–15	21	3	7.00
4	Martin Naughton	Galway	1–14	17	3	5.66
5	Pat Horgan	Cork	2–10	16	2	8.00
6	Joe Cooney	Galway	1–12	15	4	5.00
7	Noel Lane	Galway	3-05	14	3	4.66
7	Pat Fox	Tipperary	2-08	14	4	3.50
8	Tony O'Sullivan	Cork	0–13	13	2	6.50
9	Michael McGrath	Galway	1-09	12	3	4.00

Top scorers in a single game

Rank	Player	County	Tally	Total	Opposition
1	Joe Cooney	Galway	1-07	10	London
1	Nicky English	Tipperary	1-07	10	Antrim
2	Pat Horgan	Cork	1-06	9	Clare
2	Jimmy Holohan	Wexford	1-06	9	Clare
2	Mark Corrigan	Offaly	1-06	9	Galway
2	Nicky English	Tipperary	0-09	9	Cork
3	Martin Quigley	Wexford	2-02	8	Kilkenny
3	Mark Corrigan	Offaly	1-05	8	Wexford
3	Mickey Mullins	Cork	1-05	8	Clare
3	Olcan McFetridge	Antrim	1-05	8	Tipperary
3	Martin Naughton	Galway	1-05	8	Offaly
3	Tony O'Sullivan	Cork	0-08	8	Clare

=== Miscellaneous ===
- The All-Ireland semi-final between Antrim and Tipperary was their first championship meeting since the 1949 All-Ireland semi-final.
- Galway won the All Ireland title as 2nd year running went on sharing in with Meath in the Football Championship.

== Bibliography ==
- Corry, Eoghan, The GAA Book of Lists (Hodder Headline Ireland, 2005).
- Donegan, Des, The Complete Handbook of Gaelic Games (DBA Publications Limited, 2005).
