= Tony Keady =

Irish hurler

Personal information
- Native name: Aontaine Mac Céadaigh (Irish)
- Born: 5 December 1963 Attymon, County Galway, Ireland
- Died: 9 August 2017 (aged 53) Galway, Ireland
- Occupation: Caretaker
- Height: 6 ft 0 in (183 cm)

Sport
- Sport: Hurling
- Position: Centre-back
Club
- Years: Club
- Killimordaly
Club titles
- Galway titles: 1
- Connacht titles: 1
- All-Ireland Titles: 0
Inter-county
Years	County	Apps (scores)
1985–1993	Galway	15 (0–15)
Inter-county titles
- All-Irelands: 2
- NHL: 2
- All Stars: 2

Tony Keady (5 December 1963 – 9 August 2017) was an Irish hurler. His league and championship career at senior level with the Galway county team lasted nine seasons from 1985 until 1993.

Born in Attymon, County Galway, Keady first played competitive hurling during his schooling at Athenry Vocational School. In 1980 he was selected for the Galway vocational schools team and went on to win-back-to-back All-Ireland medals over the next two years.

By this stage Keady was a regular player at underage levels with the Killimordaly club. After winning several minor and under-21 championship medals, he won a county junior championship medal in 1983 before winning a county senior championship medal in 1986. He later won a Connacht medal.

Keady made his debut on the inter-county scene at the age of sixteen when he was selected for the Galway minor team. He enjoyed two championship seasons with the minors, however, Keady was an All-Ireland runner-up in 1981. He subsequently spent three seasons with the Galway under-21 team, winning an All-Ireland medal in 1983.

Keady made his senior debut during the 1984-85 league and won back-to-back All-Ireland medals in 1987 and 1988. He also won two National Hurling League medals and was named Hurler of the Year in 1988. Keady played his last game for Galway in April 1993 before being dropped from the team during the subsequent championship.

After being chosen on the Connacht inter-provincial team for the first time in 1985, Keady was a regular choice on the starting fifteen for the following few years. During that time he won two Railway Cup medals. He is considered the best centre-backs of all time.

== Playing career ==
=== School ===
As a student at Athenry Vocational School, Keady excelled at hurling and was selected for the Galway vocational schools team. He won his first All-Ireland medal in 1980 as Galway defeated Down before collecting a second successive winners' medal in 1981 when Galway accounted for Offaly.

=== Club ===
Keady played his club hurling with Killimordaly and enjoyed much success at juvenile and underage levels. He won numerous championship medals at under-14, under-16, minor and under-21, before eventually progressing onto the club's adult team where he won a county junior championship medal in 1983.

After losing back-to-back county senior championship finals in 1984 and 1985, Killimordaly overcame Turloughmore by 0–17 to 2–7 in the 1986 decider, with Keady as a key member of the team. He later won a Connacht medal following 6–16 to 1–4 defeat of Tooreen.

=== Inter-county ===
==== Minor and under-21 ====
Keady first played for Galway as a member of the minor hurling team on 3 August 1980. He scored 0–3 on his debut in a 1–15 to 0–18 All-Ireland semi-final draw with Wexford. He was still eligible for the minor grade in 1981 as Galway qualified for an All-Ireland final meeting with Kilkenny on 6 September 1981. Galway had a goal after 20 seconds and had a 3–5 to 1–8 lead at half time, however, they only scored four points in the second half and were defeated by 1–20 to 3–9.

In 1982 Keady progressed onto the Galway under-21 team, with the team later qualifying for the All-Ireland final against Cork on 12 September 1982. Both defences were in complete control in the first ever goalless final, with the game hanging in the balance throughout. Cork came from behind in the closing stages to win by a single point after a long-range effort from Kevin Hennessy.

Galway reached a second successive All-Ireland final on 11 September 1983 with Tipperary providing the opposition on this occasion. Playing with the aid of a strong first-half breeze, Galway dominated over the course of the match. A 0–12 to 1–6 victory gave Keady his sole All-Ireland medal in the grade.

==== Senior ====
Keady made his senior debut on 10 February 1985 in a 1–14 to 0–10 National Hurling League defeat by Offaly. Later that summer he made his championship debut in a 4–12 to 5–5 All-Ireland semi-final defeat of Cork. Offaly provided the opposition in the subsequent All-Ireland final on 1 September 1985 and it was their goal-scoring ability that proved crucial. Pat Cleary scored the first of the day after twenty-five minutes of play and got his second less than half a minute after the restart. Joe Dooley had a goal disallowed halfway through the second-half while a long Joe Cooney effort, which seemed to cross the goal line, was not given. P. J. Molloy was Galway's goal scorer, however, the day belonged to Offaly. A 2–11 to 1–12 score line resulted in defeat for Galway.

Galway reached a second successive All-Ireland decider on 7 September 1986, with the team installed as red-hot favourites against an ageing Cork team. On the day a different story unfolded as four goals - one from John Fenton, two from Tomás Mulcahy and one from Kevin Hennessy - stymied the Galway attack and helped Cork to a 4–13 to 2–15 victory. In spite of the defeat Keady was later presented with a first All-Star award.

Keady enjoyed his first success at senior level in 1987 when Galway won their first National Hurling League title in over a decade following a 3–12 to 3–10 defeat of Clare. The team subsequently qualified for an All-Ireland final on 6 September 1987, however, the prospect of becoming the first team to lose three consecutive championship deciders weighed heavily on the Galway team as Kilkenny provided the opposition. The game was not a classic by any standard and Noel Lane got a key goal for Galway nine minutes before the end. A 1–12 to 0–9 victory gave Keady a first All-Ireland medal.

In 1988 Galway reached a fourth successive All-Ireland final. After more than a decade-and-a-half in the wilderness Tipperary were back providing the opposition in the championship decider on 4 September 1988. Galway defeated Tipperary in the semi-final the previous year, however, with an extra year's experience it was expected that Tipperary might shade the victory. Galway used this to motivate themselves. Noel Lane again scored the crucial goal for Galway while Nicky English sent a late penalty over the bar for a point. A 1–15 to 0–14 score line resulted in victory for Galway and a second All-Ireland medal for Keady. Another solid performance at centre-back resulted in a second All-Star award, while he also became the third Galway player to win the Texaco Hurler of the Year.

While Keady was now regarded as the best hurler in the country, all of this was about to change in 1989. Shortly after collecting a second National League medal he travelled to the United States to play an exhibition game for Laois against Tipperary. This was common practice at the time and the Galwayman was assured that he was eligible to do so. It later transpired that Keady had been wrongly informed and that he had played illegally.

When he returned to Ireland the Games Administration Committee of the Gaelic Athletic Association decided to make an example of Keady and he was banned from playing for a year. This threw Galway's plans of capturing a third title in-a-row into disarray. The team even considered withdrawing from the championship; however, in the end they decided to play, albeit without the services of Keady. An ill-tempered All-Ireland semi-final saw Tipperary defeat Galway for the first time since 1971.

In 1990 Galway reached their fifth All-Ireland final in six seasons. Just like in 1986 Cork provided the opposition and, once again, Galway were regarded as the red-hot favourites. Keady's side gave a brilliant first-half display and went seven-points up at one stage. Despite this, Cork fought back to secure a victory on a score line of 5–15 to 2–21. It was one of the highest-scoring All-Ireland finals ever.

=== Inter-provincial ===
Keady also lined out with Connacht in the Railway Cup inter-provincial competition. He captured two winners medal in this competition in 1986 as Connacht defeated Munster and again in 1991 after a defeat of the same team.

== Personal life ==
Keady was married to Margaret and they had four children. They lived in Oranmore, where Keady worked as the caretaker in Calansanctius College. On the morning of 8 August 2017, Keady suffered a major heart attack at his home and was taken to University Hospital Galway. He died on the evening of 9 August 2017, at the age of 53. His funeral was held on 13 August in the Roman Catholic Church of the Immaculate Conception in Oranmore.

During the 2017 All-Ireland Senior Hurling Final, in which Galway defeated Waterford, supporters of both teams applauded in tribute to Keady after six minutes of the match. Galway captain David Burke also paid tribute to him (and fellow deceased Galway hurler Niall Donohue) in his winning captains speech.

== Honours ==
=== Player ===
Killimordaly

- Galway Senior Hurling Championship (1): 1986
- Connacht Senior Club Hurling Championship (1): 1986

Galway

- All-Ireland Senior Hurling Championship (2): 1987, 1988
- National Hurling League (2): 1986-87, 1988-89
- All-Ireland Under-21 Hurling Championship (1): 1983

Connacht

- Railway Cup (2): 1986, 1991

=== Individual ===
Awards

- Texaco Hurler of the Year (1): 1988
- All-Star (2): 1986, 1988
- All-Ireland Senior Hurling Championship Final Man of the Match (1): 1988

Awards
Preceded by Joe Cooney	Texaco Hurler of the Year; 1988	Succeeded by Nicky English
