= Ger Cunningham =

Irish hurler and Gaelic football player

Personal information
- Native name: Gearóid Mac Cuinneagáin (Irish)
- Born: 30 August 1961 (age 65) Togher, Cork, Ireland
- Occupation: Sports sponsorship manager
- Height: 6 ft 1 in (185 cm)

Sport
- Sport: Hurling
- Position: Goalkeeper
Club
- Years: Club
- 1979–1999: St Finbarr's
Club titles
- Cork titles: 6
- Munster titles: 1
- All-Ireland Titles: 0
Inter-county
Years	County	Apps (scores)
1981–1999	Cork	50 (0-00)
Inter-county titles
- Munster titles: 7
- All-Irelands: 3
- NHL: 3
- All Stars: 4

Gerard Cunningham (born 30 August 1961) is an Irish hurling manager and former player who played for Cork Senior Championship club St Finbarr's. He played for the Cork senior hurling team for 20 years, during which time he lined out as a goalkeeper. Unchallenged in the number one position for his entire career, Cunningham is regarded as one of the greatest players of all time.

Cunningham began his hurling career at club level with St Finbarr's. He broke onto the club's top adult team as a 17-year-old in 1979 and had his first success the following year when the club won the 1980 Munster Club Championship. Cunningham was the St Finbarr's first-choice goalkeeper for almost twenty years, during which time he also won six Cork Championship titles.

At inter-county level, Cunningham was part of the successful Cork minor team that won back-to-back All-Ireland Championships in 1978 and 1979 before later winning an All-Ireland Championship with the under-21 team in 1982. He joined the Cork senior team in 1979. From his debut, Cunningham was ever-present as a goalkeeper and made a combined total of 161 National League and Championship appearances in a career that ended with his last game in 1998. During that time he was part of three All-Ireland Championship-winning teams – in 1984, 1986 and 1990. Cunningham also secured seven Munster Championship medals and three National Hurling League medals. He announced his retirement from inter-county hurling on 15 January 1999.

At inter-provincial level, Cunningham was selected to play in eight championship campaigns with Munster, winning Railway Cup medals in 1984, 1985 and 1992. He won his first All-Star in 1984, before claiming a further three All-Stars in 1985, 1986 and 1990. After being named Hurler of the Year in 1986, Cunningham has been repeatedly voted onto teams made up of the sport's greats, including as goalkeeper on the Cork Hurling Team of the Millennium.

In retirement from playing Cunningham became involved in team management and coaching. At club level he has taken charge of St Finbarr's and University College Cork and guided Ballygunner to Waterford Senior Championship success in Waterford. He is also an All-Ireland-winning goalkeeping coach and selector with the Cork senior team, while he served as manager of the Dublin senior hurling team for three seasons.

== Biography ==
Ger Cunningham was born in Cork in 1961. He was educated locally at Sullivan's Quay national school where he was first introduced to the game of hurling by Brother Moloughney, a hurling enthusiast from County Tipperary. Cunningham later attended Colaiste Íognáid Rís where Billy Morgan nurtured his Gaelic football skills. He currently works as a sales representative with Bord Gáis, an Irish energy company.

== Playing career ==
=== St Finbarr's ===
Cunningham joined the St Finbarr's club at a young age and played in all grades at juvenile and underage levels without success. He was just 18-years-old when he joined the St Finbarr's senior team as first-choice goalkeeper in advance of the 1979 Championship. On 7 October 1979, Cunningham lined out in goal when St Finbarr's faced Blackrock in the final; however, he ended the game on the losing side after a 2-14 to 2-06 defeat.

On 12 October 1980, Cunningham lined out in a second successive final when St Finbarr's faced Glen Rovers. He ended the game with his first winners' medal following a 1-09 to 2-04 victory. Cunningham claimed a Munster Championship medal on 12 October 1980 after a 2-12 to 1-14 defeat of Roscrea in the Munster final. The All-Ireland final on 17 May 1981 saw St Finbarr's suffer a 1-15 to 1-11 defeat by Ballyhale Shamrocks, with Cunningham once again lining out in goal.

St Finbarr's qualified for a third successive final on 13 September 1981, with Cunningham once again lining out in goal against Glen Rovers. He ended the game with a second successive championship medal following the 1-12 to 1-09 victory.

On 10 October 1982, Cunningham played in his fourth successive final when St Finbarr's faced Blackrock. He ended the game with a third successive winners' medal as well as being named man of the match after the 2-17 to 3-09 victory.

For the fifth successive season, St Finbarr's qualified for the final with Cunningham lining out in goal against Midleton. For the second time in his career he ended on the losing side after a 1-18 to 2-09 defeat.

Cunningham lined out in a sixth successive final on 30 September 1984 when St Finbarr's faced Ballyhea. He claimed a fourth championship winners' medal overall after the 1-15 to 2-04 victory.

Cunningham was appointed captain of the team in advance of the 1988 Championship. On 16 October 1988, he captained the team to a final appearance against Glen Rovers. Cunningham ended the game with a fifth winners' medal after the 3-18 to 2-14 victory, while he also had the honour of lifting the Seán Óg Murphy Cup on behalf of the team.

On 14 October 1990, Cunningham made his eighth final appearance when he lined out in goal in a 3-06 to 1-12 draw with Na Piarsaigh. The replay a week later saw Cunningham end up on the losing side after a 2-07 to 1-08 defeat.

Cunningham assumed the captaincy of the team for the 1993 Championship. On 10 October 1993, he lined out in goal in a 10th county final, with first-time finalists Carbery holding St Finbarr's to a 1-17 apiece draw. The replay a week later saw Cunningham selected as man of the match as he claimed his sixth winners' medal following a 1-14 to 1-13 victory.

=== Cork ===
==== Minor and under-21 ====
Cunningham first played for Cork as a dual player during the 1978 Munster Championships; however, it was with the hurling team that he had his greatest successes. On 30 July 1978, he won a Munster Championship medal after lining out in goal in the 1-14 to 3-06 defeat of Tipperary in the final. On 3 September 1978, Cunningham was again selected in goal when Cork faced Kilkenny in the All-Ireland final. He ended the game with a winners' medal after the 1-15 to 1-08 victory.

On 8 July 1979, Cunningham won a second successive Munster Championship medal, however, an injury ruled him out of the 3-17 to 4-04 defeat of Limerick in the final. For the second year in succession, Cork qualified to play Kilkenny in the All-Ireland final. Cunningham - who was restored to the starting fifteen - ended the game with a second successive All-Ireland medal after the 2-11 to 1-09 victory.

Cunningham subsequently joined both the Cork under-21 hurling and football teams. He collected a set of Munster and All-Ireland medals with the under-21 footballers as an unused substitute in 1981, following respective provincial and All-Ireland decider defeats of Kerry and Galway.

The following year Cunningham added a Munster medal with the under-21 hurlers to his collection. Galway were the opponents in the subsequent All-Ireland decider on a day when both defences gave superb displays. Cork came from behind in the closing stages to win by a single point, scored from long range by Kevin Hennessy. It was yet another underage All-Ireland medal for Cunningham.

==== Senior ====
In 1979 Cunningham was still a member of the Cork minor hurling team when he joined the county senior panel. He made his senior debut in May 1980, lining out against Kilkenny in a challenge match. Cunningham replaced Timmy Murphy as Cork's first-choice goalkeeper the following year and remained an ever-present fixture for the best part of twenty years.

In 1981 Cunningham enjoyed his first major success at senior level when he won a National Hurling League medal following a victory over Offaly. Success in the championship eluded him until 1982 when he collected his first senior Munster title following a 5–31 to 3–6 drubbing of Waterford. The subsequent All-Ireland final pitted Cork against Kilkenny, with 'the Rebels' installed as the red-hot favourites. All did not go to plan as Kilkenny dominated. Christy Heffernan was the hero of the day as he scored two goals in a forty-second spell just before half-time. Ger Fennelly captured a third goal in the second half as Kilkenny completely trounced 'the Rebels' by 3–18 to 1–15.

Cunningham claimed a second Munster title in 1983 as Waterford fell heavily by 3–22 to 0–12 for the second consecutive year. After defeating Galway in the All-Ireland semi-final Cork squared up to Kilkenny in the All-Ireland final for the second year in-a-row. Once again Kilkenny dominated the game, assisted by a strong wind in the first-half, and hung on in the face of a great fight-back by Cork. At the full-time whistle Kilkenny emerged victorious by 2–14 to 2–12. For the second consecutive year Cunningham had ended up on the losing side on All-Ireland final day.

These two defeats only made Cunningham and Cork more determined to bounce back in 1984. That year he claimed a third Munster title in-a-row following a classic victory over an unlucky Tipperary side. This victory allowed Cork to advance to a third consecutive All-Ireland final. It was a special year for followers of hurling and football as the Gaelic Athletic Association was celebrating its centenary year. As a gesture to Thurles, the cradle town of the association, the All-Ireland final was played in Semple Stadium that year. Offaly provided the opposition and, ironically, it was the first meeting of these two sides in one hundred years of Gaelic games. The game was a triumph for Cork, who won by 3–16 to 1–12 courtesy of second-half goals by Kevin Hennessy and Seánie O'Leary. At the third time of asking Cunningham had finally collected his first senior All-Ireland medal. He was later presented with his first All-Star award.

In 1985 Cunningham was appointed captain of the Cork senior hurling team for the first time. That year he guided his team to a fourth successive Munster title as Tipp were defeated once again. Cork were subsequently caught on-the-hop by Galway in a rain-soaked All-Ireland semi-final. In spite of this he was later presented with second All-Star award.

Cork continued their dominance in Munster in 1986 with Cunningham capturing a record-equalling fifth Munster medal in-a-row as Clare were accounted for. A subsequent defeat of Antrim allowed Cork to advance directly to the All-Ireland final where Galway provided the opposition. Galway were the red hot favourites to take the title and defeat Cork for the first time in a championship decider. The pundits and commentators got it wrong as an open game of hurling saw Cork score 4–13 to Galway's 2–15. A four-point win gave Cork the title and gave Cunningham a second All-Ireland medal. He was later presented with a third consecutive All-Star. Cunningham was also honoured by being named Texaco Hurler of the Year.

Over the next three years Tipperary re-emerged as the kingpins of Munster hurling as Cork's fortunes took a downturn. One of the lowest points in Cunningham's career happened during this drought for Cork hurling. Playing against Waterford in 1989 Cunningham received a heavy knock to the head and spent the remainder of the game in a daze, conceding three goals.

Cork were back in 1990 and, against all the odds, they wrestled the Munster title from Tipperary after Babs Keating's famous 'donkeys don't win derbies' remark. It was Cunningham's seventh provincial title. The subsequent All-Ireland final that year pitted Cork against Galway for the second time in four years. Once again, Galway were the bookies favourites and justified this tag by going seven points ahead in the opening thirty-five minutes thanks to a masterful display by Joe Cooney. Cork fought back with an equally expert display by Tomás Mulcahy. The game was effectively decided on an incident which occurred midway through the second half when Cunningham blocked a point-blank shot from Martin Naughton with his nose. The umpires gave no 65-metre free, even though he clearly deflected it out wide. Cork went on to win a high-scoring and open game of hurling by 5–15 to 2–21. It was Cunningham's third All-Ireland medal and the first of a remarkable hurling and football double for Cork.

Cunningham claimed his seventh Munster medal in 1992, however, Cork faced the old enemy Kilkenny in another All-Ireland final. Prior to the game Kilkenny won the toss, however, 'the Cats' chose to play against the wind. At half-time his side were only two points in arrears thanks to a D.J. Carey goal four minutes before the interval. John Power and Michael Phelan added two second-half goals to give Kilkenny a 3–10 to 1–12 win. It was the third time in his hurling career that Cunningham had been beaten by Kilkenny in a championship decider.

In 1993 Cunningham won a second National Hurling League medal with Cork. Although he would remain as Cork goalkeeper for another few seasons Cunningham would never win another Munster or All-Ireland title. His final winners' medal came in 1998 when he claimed a third National League medal. Following Cork's defeat in the early stages of the championship Cunningham decided to retire from inter-county hurling. At the age of 37 he had donned the famed red and white hooped jersey for almost 20 years, during which time he made 50 consecutive championship appearances while also playing in 111 National League games.

=== Munster ===
Cunningham also lined out with Munster in the inter-provincial hurling championship where he played alongside his championship rivals from Tipperary, Limerick, Clare and Waterford. He first played for his province in 1983 as Munster were defeated by Connacht in the semi-final of the competition. Cunningham was the Munster custodian again in 1984. That year his province were successful in defeating Leinster to take the Railway Cup title. Cunningham added a second consecutive Railway Cup medal to his collection in 1985 as Connacht were accounted for by 3–6 to 1–11. After defeats by Leinster and Connacht over the next few years Cunningham surrendered his place on the team to Tipperary's Ken Hogan. He was back on the team in 1991, however, it wasn't until 1992 when Cunningham collected his third Railway Cup title. His last outing with the province was in 1994 when Connacht were victorious in the semi-final.

== Coaching career ==
In retirement from play Cunningham maintained a keen interest in the game. The year after he quit the inter-county scene the hurling experts were charged with picking a Team of the Millennium. Cunningham was Cork's best prospect for the goalkeeping position; however, he faced still opposition from such legends as Kilkenny duo Ollie Walsh and Noel Skehan and Wexford's Art Foley. In the end the honour went to Tipperary's three in-a-row winning 'keeper Tony Reddin.

=== Cork (2003–2006) ===
Cunningham later served as a selector and goalkeeping coach to the Cork team under the managerial reigns of both Dónal O'Grady and John Allen from 2003 until 2006. During this time Cork captured three Munster titles and appeared in four consecutive All-Ireland finals, winning two. Cunningham was even the favourite to succeed Allen as manager when he stepped down in 2006, however, the position went to Gerald McCarthy instead, without Cunningham even being approached about his intentions. Since retiring from playing he has also coached various St. Finbarr's teams.

=== Ballygunner ===
In January 2009 Cunningham succeeded Peter Queally as manager of the Ballygunner senior club team in Waterford. His one-year tenure saw the club return to success. A narrow 1–17 to 0–19 replay defeat of Lismore secured the club's first championship crown in four years.

=== Cork (2011–2013) ===
In September 2011 Cunningham was named as a selector, and later as coach, in Jimmy Barry-Murphy's new Cork senior hurling management team. During Cunningham's tenure, Cork reached their first All-Ireland final in seven years. An exciting 3–16 apiece draw with Clare was followed by a 5–16 to 3–16 defeat in the replay. Cunningham stepped down as a selector on 5 November 2013, while his name was linked to the then vacant managerial post with Limerick.

=== Dublin ===
In October 2014, Cunningham was named as the new Dublin county hurling team manager on a three-year term. In July 2017, Cunningham stepped down as Dublin manager after three years.

== Career statistics ==
=== Manager ===
As of match played 9 July 2017.

Team	From	To	Walsh Cup				National League				Leinster				All-Ireland				Total				
Team	From	To	G	W	D	L	G	W	D	L	G	W	D	L	G	W	D	L	G	W	D	L	Win %
Dublin	8 October 2014	8 July 2017	9	8	0	1	13	7	0	6	4	1	0	3	5	2	0	3	26	17	0	9	65

== Honours ==
=== Player ===
Participant

- All-Ireland Poc Fada Championship (7): 1984, 1985, 1986, 1987, 1988, 1989, 1990

St Finbarr's

- Munster Senior Club Hurling Championship (1): 1980
- Cork Senior Hurling Championship (6): 1980, 1981, 1982, 1984, 1988, 1993

Cork

- All-Ireland Senior Hurling Championship (3): 1984, 1986, 1990
- Munster Senior Hurling Championship (7): 1982, 1983, 1984, 1985 (c), 1986, 1990, 1992
- National Hurling League (3): 1980–81, 1992–93, 1998
- All-Ireland Under-21 Hurling Championship (1): 1982
- Munster Under-21 Hurling Championship (1): 1982
- All-Ireland Minor Hurling Championship (2): 1978, 1979
- Munster Minor Hurling Championship (1): 1978

Munster

- Railway Cup (3): 1984, 1985 (c), 1992

=== Individual ===
Honours

- Cork Hurling Team of the Century: Goalkeeper
- Munster Hurling Team of the Last 25 Years (1984–2009): Goalkeeper
- Texaco Hurler of the Year (1): 1986
- All-Stars (4): 1984, 1985, 1986, 1990

=== Coach/Selector ===
Ballygunner

- Waterford Senior Hurling Championship (1): 2009

St. Finbarr's

- Cork Premier Senior Hurling Championship (1): 2022

Cork

- All-Ireland Senior Hurling Championship (2): 2004, 2005
- Munster Senior Hurling Championship (3): 2003, 2005, 2006

Sporting positions
Preceded by John Fenton	Cork Senior Hurling Captain; 1985	Succeeded by Tom Cashman
Preceded by Denis Mulcahy	Cork Senior Hurling Captain; 1989	Succeeded by Kieran McGuckin
Preceded by Brian Corcoran	Cork Senior Hurling Captain; 1994	Succeeded by Pat Kenneally
Preceded by Anthony Daly	Dublin Senior Hurling Manager; 2014–2017	Succeeded by Pat Gilroy
Achievements
Preceded by John Fenton (Munster)	Interprovincial Hurling Final winning captain 1985	Succeeded by Noel Lane (Connacht)
Awards
Preceded by Eugene Coughlan (Offaly)	Texaco Hurler of the Year; 1986	Succeeded by Joe Cooney (Galway)
