= Noel Lane (Galway hurler) =

Irish hurler and manager

Personal information
- Native name: Nollaig Ó Laighin (Irish)
- Born: 11 December 1954 (age 71) Ballyglass, County Galway, Ireland
- Occupation: Coillte Tree Care Services Manager
- Height: 6 ft 1 in (185 cm)

Sport
- Sport: Hurling
- Position: Full-forward
Club
| Years | Club | Apps (scores) |
| 1974–1999 | Ballinderreen | 77 (19–94) |
Club titles
- Galway titles: 0
Inter-county*
| Years | County | Apps (scores) |
| 1977–1990 | Galway | 22 (13–48) |
Inter-county titles
- All-Irelands: 3
- NHL: 2
- All Stars: 2
- *Inter County team apps and scores correct as of 23:16, 17 February 2014.

Noel Lane (born 11 December 1954) is an Irish former hurler who played as a full-forward at senior level for the Galway county team.

Born in Ballyglass, County Galway, Lane first played competitive hurling while at school in Our Lady's College, Gort. He arrived on the inter-county scene at the age of twenty-two when he made his senior debut with Galway in the 1977–78 National Hurling League. Lane went on to play a key role for Galway for more than a decade, and won three All-Ireland medals and two National Hurling League medals. He was an All-Ireland runner-up on five occasions.

As a member of the Connacht inter-provincial team at various times, Lane won five Railway Cup medals. At club level he played with Ballinderreen.

Throughout his career Lane made 22 championship appearances for Galway. His retirement came following the conclusion of the 1990 championship.

Lane is widely regarded as one of Galway's greatest hurlers. He has often been voted onto teams made up of the sport's greats, including at left corner-forward on the Galway Hurling Team of the Millennium.

After his retirement, Lane became involved in team management and coaching. During a two-year term as manager of the Galway senior hurlers, he guided the team to an All-Ireland final appearance.

== Playing career ==
=== College ===
Lane attended Our Lady's College in Gort, however, he found it difficult to break onto the school's senior hurling team. During his tenure Our Lady's College won four consecutive Connacht titles; however, Lane's side were defeated by St Peter's College, Wexford in the All-Ireland decider in 1973.

=== Club ===
Lane experienced much success at juvenile and underage levels with Ballinderreen, winning south championship medals in the under-14, under-16 and under-21 grades.

In 1978 Lane was one of the key forwards as Ballinderreen reached the senior championship decider for the first time in over forty years. Ardrahan provided the opposition with the game ending in stalemate. The subsequent replay also ended in a draw, however, a period of extra-time saw Ardrahan win by 2–18 to 2–14.

=== Inter-county ===
Lane made his senior inter-county debut on 9 October 1977 in a 4–13 to 1–10 defeat by Clare in the opening round of the National Hurling League. He was subsequently included on the starting fifteen for Galway's unsuccessful championship campaign.

In 1979 Galway later shocked four-in-a-row hopefuls Cork in the All-Ireland semi-final and qualified for an All-Ireland final showdown with Kilkenny. In one of the worst All-Ireland finals of the decade, Tipperary-born Galway goalkeeper Séamus Shinnors had an absolute nightmare of a game. A 70-yards free by Liam "Chunky" O'Brien after just four minutes dipped, hit off Shinnors and ended up in the Galway net. Galway fought back and went two points up twelve minutes into the second half, however, they did not score for the rest of the game. Four minutes before the end of the game another long-range free for Kilkenny ended up in the net behind Shinnors. Kilkenny went on to win by 2–12 to 1–8. In spite of this defeat Lane's goal in the final was named goal of the year.

In 1980 Galway defeated Kildare and Offaly to reach a second consecutive All-Ireland final. Munster champions Limerick provided the opposition on this occasion and an exciting championship decider followed. Lane nearly didn't make it to the throw-in after he was accidentally hit by in the head by a hurley running out onto the pitch, however, his injury was stitched up and he played a full part. Bernie Forde and P. J. Molloy goals for Galway meant that the men from the west led by 2–7 to 1–5 at half-time. Éamonn Cregan single-handedly launched the Limerick counter-attack in the second-half. Over the course of the game he scored 2–7, including an overhead goal and a point in which he showed the ball to full-back Conor Hayes and nonchalantly drove the ball over the bar. It was not enough to stem the tide and Galway went on to win the game by 2–15 to 3–9. It was Galway's first All-Ireland title since 1923, with Lane picking up a winners' medal and the celebrations surpassed anything ever seen in Croke Park.

1981 saw Galway reach a third consecutive All-Ireland final and Offaly were the opponents. Everything seemed to be going well for Lane's side as Galway hoped to capture a second consecutive All-Ireland title. Offaly 'keeper Damien Martin was doing great work in batting out an almost certain Galway goal early in the second-half. With twenty-three minutes left in the game Galway led by six points, however, they failed to score for the rest of the game. Johnny Flaherty hand-passed Offaly's second goal with just three minutes remaining. At the long whistle Galway were defeated by 2–12 to 0–15.

The next three seasons saw Galway exit the championship at the All-Ireland semi-final stage, but Lane earned back-to-back All-Star awards in 1983 and 1984.

Galway shocked reigning All-Ireland champions Cork in the semi-final to reach the decider again in 1985. Offaly provided the opposition in the subsequent All-Ireland final and another tense game ensued. Once again it was Offaly's goal-scoring ability that proved crucial. Pat Cleary scored the first of the day after twenty-five minutes of play and got his second less than half a minute after the restart. Joe Dooley had a goal disallowed halfway through the second-half while a long Joe Cooney effort, which seemed to cross the goal line, was not given. P. J. Molloy was Galway's goal scorer, however, the day belonged to Offaly. A 2–11 to 1–12 score line resulted in defeat for Galway.

Galway reached a second successive All-Ireland decider again in 1986, with Lane serving as team captain for the year. The men from the west were the red-hot favourites against an ageing Cork team, however, on the day a different story unfolded. Four Cork goals, one from John Fenton, two from Tomás Mulcahy and one from Kevin Hennessy, stymied the Galway attack and helped "the Rebels" to a 4–13 to 2–15 victory.

Lane won his first National Hurling League medal in 1987 when he was strung from the bench in the 3–12 to 3–10 league decider defeat of Clare. Later that summer Galway qualified for a third All-Ireland final in-a-row. The prospect of becoming the first team to lose three consecutive championship deciders weighed heavily on the Galway team as Kilkenny provided the opposition. The game was not a classic by any standard, however, Lane, who started the game on the sideline and was introduced as a substitute, got a key goal for Galway nine minutes before the end. A 1–12 to 0–9 victory gave him a second All-Ireland medal.

In 1988 Galway reached a fourth successive All-Ireland final and were favourites to retain the title. Tipperary opposed them in the championship decider. Galway defeated Tipp in the semi-final the previous year, however, with an extra year's experience it was expected that Tipperary might shade the victory. Galway used this to motivate themselves. After returning to form throughout the year, there was some surprise when Lane was dropped from the starting fifteen. He was introduced as a substitute once again and scored a crucial goal while Nicky English sent a late penalty over the bar for a point. A 1–15 to 0–14 score line resulted in victory for Galway and a third All-Ireland medal for Lane.

Lane retained his reputation as a super sub in 1989 and collected a second National League medal that year after being introduced mid-way during the 2–16 to 4–8 defeat of Tipperary. For the third time in as many years both sides later met in the All-Ireland series, however, on this occasion the men from the West were controversially without their star player Tony Keady. The game turned out to be a tense and unsavory affair as Tipp finally triumphed over Galway. The Munster team won 1–17 to 2–11..

In 1990 Lane was thirty-five years of age and was regarded as the veteran of the Galway team in his eighth appearance in an All-Ireland final. Cork were the opponents, however, Galway were the red-hot favourites as they set out to win a third championship in four years. Shortly after half-time the westerners were up by seven points and were cruising to victory. Cork were a changed team in the second half, with captain Tomás Mulcahy scoring a key goal that seemed to revitalise the team. The final score of 5–15 to 2–21 brought a fifth All-Ireland final defeat for Lane. This defeat also brought the curtain down on his inter-county career.

=== Inter-provincial ===
Lane also lined out with Connacht in the inter-provincial series of games and enjoyed much success.

In 1979 Lane was at right corner-forward as Connacht reached the inter-provincial decider. A 1–13 to 1–9 defeat by Leinster was the result on that occasion. Lane retained the same position on the team in 1980 as Connacht faced Railway Cup specialists Munster in the decider. A low-scoring game followed, however, a 1–5 to 0–7 victory gave Connacht their first Railway Cup title since 1947. It was Lane's first winners' medal in the inter-pro competition.

Connacht reached the Railway Cup final again in 1982. A 3–8 to 2–9 victory over Leinster gave Lane his second Railway Cup medal. Defeat of the same opposition in 1983 allowed Connacht to retain the title for the first time in their history.

After defeat to Munster in 1985, both sides renewed their rivalry in the inter-provincial decider again in 1986. A comprehensive 3–11 to 0–11 victory gave Lane, who was captain of the team, a fourth Railway Cup medal.

In 1987 Connacht faced Leinster in the final once again. A narrow 2–14 to 1–14 victory to Connacht gave Lane a fifth and final Railway Cup medal.

== Managerial career ==
Noel Lane
Sport
Inter-county management
- Years: Team
- 2000–2002: Galway
Inter-county titles as manager
| County | League | Province | All-Ireland |
| Galway | 0 | 0 | 0 |

=== Galway ===
On 11 October 2000, Lane defeated incumbent Mattie Murphy by 33 votes to 21 to become manager of the Galway senior hurling team.

In his opening season Lane's team surrendered their National League crown, however, a shock All-Ireland semi-final defeat of reigning champions Kilkenny propelled Galway to a championship showdown with old rivals Tipperary. Galway put it up to Tipp, however, two goals by Mark O'Leary gave the Munster men the threshold to withstand a Galway comeback. With nine minutes to go Galway were only a point in arrears, however, Tipperary outscored Galway by five to three in those closing minutes. At the final whistle Tipperary were the winners by 2–18 to 2–15.

Galway exited the 2002 championship at the hands of Clare in the All-Ireland semi-final. This was Lane's last game in charge of Galway, however, he has been linked with a return to management on several occasions.

== Personal life ==
Born in Ballyglass, County Galway, Lane was educated at the local national school before later attending Our Lady's College in Gort. He pursued his interest in forestry and agriculture at college in Athenry, Kinnity and Avondale. Lane subsequently became a regional manager for wood company Coillte.

== Honours ==
=== Player ===
Galway

- All-Ireland Senior Hurling Championship (3): 1980, 1987, 1988
- National Hurling League (2): 1986–87, 1988–89

Connacht

- Railway Cup (5): 1980, 1982, 1983, 1986 (c), 1987

=== Individual ===
Awards

- All-Star (2): 1983, 1984
- Galway Hurler of the Year (1): 1984

Sporting positions
| Preceded by Michael Connolly | Galway Senior Hurling Captain; 1986 | Succeeded by Conor Hayes |
| Preceded by Mattie Murphy | Galway Senior Hurling Manager; 2000–2002 | Succeeded by Conor Hayes |
Achievements
| Preceded by Ger Cunningham (Munster) | Railway Cup Hurling Final winning captain 1986 | Succeeded by Conor Hayes (Connacht) |
