= Denis Bingham =

Irish cricketer and military historian

Personal information
- Full name: Denis Arthur Bingham
- Born: 6 November 1829 near Ballyglass, Ireland
- Died: 8 July 1897 (aged 67); Cheltenham, Gloucestershire, England
- Batting: Unknown

Career statistics
Competition	First-class
Matches	1
Runs scored	2
Batting average	1.00
100s/50s	–/–
Top score	2
Catches/stumpings	–/–
- Source: Cricinfo, 12 August 2019

Denis Arthur Bingham (6 November 1829 – 8 July 1897) was an Irish first-class cricketer and military historian.

The son of Denis Arthur Bingham, 3rd Baron Clanmorris and his wife, Maria Helena Persse, he was born at the Newbrook Estate near Ballyglass in County Mayo in November 1829. He was educated in England at Rugby School. Bingham made a single appearance in first-class cricket for the Gentlemen of England against the Gentlemen of Marylebone Cricket Club at Lord's in 1853. Batting twice in the match, he was dismissed in the Gentlemen of England first-innings for a single run by John Parker, while in their second-innings he was dismissed by the same bowler for the same score. He married Eugenie Colette Gabriele de Lacretelle, of Burgundy, in November 1864. He later moved to Paris, where he wrote a number of books on French military history, ranging from the French Revolution to a first-hand account of the Siege of Paris during the Franco-Prussian War. He later moved to England, where he died at Cheltenham in July 1897.
