= 1986 All-Ireland Senior Hurling Championship =

Championship details
- Dates: 1 June – 7 September 1986
- Teams: 14

All-Ireland champions
- Winning team: Cork (26th win)
- Captain: Tom Cashman
- Manager: Johnny Clifford

All-Ireland Finalists
- Losing team: Galway
- Captain: Noel Lane
- Manager: Cyril Farrell

Provincial champions
- Munster: Cork
- Leinster: Kilkenny
- Ulster: Not Played
- Connacht: Not Played

Championship statistics
- No. matches played: 13
- Top Scorer: Jimmy Barry-Murphy (5–5); Kevin Hennessy (5–5)
- Player of the Year: Ger Cunningham
- All-Star Team: See here

The All-Ireland Senior Hurling Championship of 1986 was the 100th staging of Ireland's premier hurling knock-out competition. Cork won the championship, beating Galway 4–13 to 2–15 in the final at Croke Park, Dublin.

== Format ==
=== Munster Championship ===
Participating counties (5): Clare, Cork, Limerick, Tipperary, Waterford

Quarter-final (1 match): This is a single match between the first two teams drawn from the province of Munster. One team is eliminated at this stage while the winners advance to the semi-finals.

Semi-finals (2 matches): The winner of the lone quarter-final joins the other three Munster teams to make up the semi-final pairings. Two teams are eliminated at this stage while the winners advance to the final.

Final (1 match): The winner of the two semi-finals contest this game. One team is eliminated at this stage while the winners advance to the All-Ireland semi-final.

=== Leinster Championship ===
Participating counties (6): Dublin, Kilkenny, Laois, Offaly, Westmeath, Wexford

Quarter-finals: (2 matches): These are two matches between the first four teams drawn from the province of Leinster. Two teams are eliminated at this stage while the winners advance to the semi-finals.

Semi-finals (2 matches): The winners of the two quarter-finals join the other two Leinster teams to make up the semi-final pairings. Two teams are eliminated at this stage while the winners advance to the final.

Final: (1 match) The winners of the two semi-finals contest this game. One team is eliminated at this stage while the winners advance to the All-Ireland semi-final.

=== All-Ireland Championship ===
Quarter-final (1 match): This is a single match between Galway and the winners of the All-Ireland 'B' championship. One team is eliminated at this stage while the winners advance to the semi-final where they play the Leinster champions.

Semi-finals (2 matches): The winners of the lone quarter-final join the Munster and Leinster champions and Antrim to make up the semi-final pairings. The provincial champions are kept apart in separate semi-finals. Two teams are eliminated at this stage while the winners advance to the final.

Final (1 match): The two winners of the semi-finals contest this game.

== Team changes ==
=== To Championship ===
Qualified from the All-Ireland Senior B Hurling Championship

- Kerry

=== From Championship ===
Regraded to the All-Ireland Senior B Hurling Championship

- London

== Teams ==
=== General information ===
Fourteen counties will compete in the All-Ireland Senior Hurling Championship: one team from the Connacht Senior Hurling Championship, six teams in the Leinster Senior Hurling Championship, five teams in the Munster Senior Hurling Championship, one team from the Ulster Senior Hurling Championship and one team from the All-Ireland Senior B Hurling Championship.

== Provincial championships ==
=== Leinster Senior Hurling championship ===
1 June 1986
Quarter-Final

| Laois | 3–20 – 2–7 | Westmeath |
|---|---|---|
| E. Fennelly (2–4), J. Dollard (1–1), W. Kirwan (0–4), B. Bohane (0–4), P. J. Cuddy (0–3), J. Taylor (0–2), M. O'Sullivan (0–1), P. Critchley (0–1). | | D. Kilcoyne (1–1), B. McCabe (1–0), M. Kilcoyne (0–2), S. Kilcoyne (0–1), M. Cosgrave (0–1), M. Hickey (0–1), D. McCormack (0–1). |

Croke Park, Dublin
Referee: S. Bailey (Dublin)

1 June 1986
Quarter-Final

| Kilkenny | 1–21 – 0–18 | Wexford |
|---|---|---|
| G. Fennelly (0–5), L. Ryan (0–5), R. Power (0–5), L. Fennelly (1–0), J. Mulcahy (0–3), C. Heffernan (0–1), P. Brennan (0–1), K. Brennan (0–1). | | P. Courtney (0–4), J. Houlihan (0–4), S. Fitzhenry (0–3), M. Storey (0–3), G. O'Connor (0–2), B. Byrne (0–1), S. Whelan (0–1). |

Croke Park, Dublin
Referee: G. Kirwan (Offaly)

22 June 1986
Semi-Final

| Offaly | 1–23 – 4–9 | Laois |
|---|---|---|
| P. Corrigan (0–9), D. Owens (0–5), B. Birmingham (1–0), P. Horan (0–3), M. Corrigan (0–2), P. Cleary (0–2), J. Dooley (0–1), J. Kelly (0–1). | | P. J. Cuddy (3–0), P. Critchley (1–1), E. Fennelly (0–4), B. Bohane (0–3), S. Plunkett (0–1). |

Croke Park, Dublin
Attendance: 16,000
Referee: J. Denton (Wexford)

22 June 1986
Semi-Final

| Kilkenny | 3–15 – 1–9 | Dublin |
|---|---|---|
| L. Ryan (1–3), P. Brennan (1–2), O. Heffernan (1–1), G. Fennelly (0–4), K. Brennan (0–2), L. Fennelly (0–1), H. Ryan (0–1), R. Power (0–1). | | S. McDonald (0–4), M. Ryan (1–0), B. McMahon (0–1), V. Holden (0–1), S. Dalton (0–1), J. Morris (0–1), J. Twomey (0–1). |

Croke Park, Dublin
Attendance: 16,000
Referee: P. Delaney (Laois)

13 July 1986
Final

| Kilkenny | 4–10 – 1–11 | Offaly |
|---|---|---|
| L. Fennelly (3–1), H. Ryan (1–1), G. Fennelly (0–4), P. Walsh (0–1), C. Heffernan (0–1), K. Brennan (0–1), R. Power (0–1). | | P. Corrigan (0–6), P. Delaney (1–1), J. Dooley (0–1), P. Cleary (0–1), P. Horan (0–1), M. Corrigan (0–1). |

Croke Park, Dublin
Attendance: 28,635
Referee: J. Denton (Wexford)

=== Munster Senior Hurling championship ===
1 June 1986
Quarter-Final

| Clare | 2–14 – 0–14 | Limerick |
|---|---|---|
| C. Lyons (0–6), V. Donnellan (0–4), G. McInerney (1–0), S. Dolan (1–0), J. Callinan (0–2), B. Fitzpatrick (0–1), A. Cunningham (0–1). | | P. Kelly (0–7), D. FitzGerald (0–3), R. Sampson (0–2), S. Fitzgibbon (0–1), L. Garvey (0–1). |

Cusack Park, Ennis
Attendance: 16,085
Referee: W. Horgan (Cork)

8 June 1986
Semi-Final

| Cork | 6–13 – 0–9 | Waterford |
|---|---|---|
| G. FitzGerald (2–1), K. Hennessy (2–1), T. Mulcahy (1–3), J. Barry-Murphy (1–1), P. Horgan (0–3), J. Fenton (0–3), J. Cashman (0–1). | | N. Crowley (0–3), P. Power (0–2), T. Waters (0–2), M. Walsh (0–1), P. McGrath (0–1). |

Páirc Uí Chaoimh, Cork
Attendance: 7,000
Referee: W. Barrett (Tipperary)

22 June 1986
Semi-Final

| Clare | 2–10 – 1–11 | Tipperary |
|---|---|---|
| T. Guilfoyle (1–1), G. McInerney (1–0), V. Donnellan (0–3), S. Fitzpatrick (0–2), C. Lyons (0–2), S. Dolan (0–1), A. Cunningham (0–1). | | S. Power (0–5), L. Maher (1–1), L. Stokes (0–3), P. Kennedy (0–1), R. Callaghan (0–1). |

Cusack Park, Ennis
Attendance: 21,655
Referee: T. Murray (Limerick)

20 July 1986
Final

| Cork | 2–18 – 3–12 | Clare |
|---|---|---|
| J. Fenton (0–8), J. Fitzgibbon (1–1), J. Barry-Murphy (1–1), T. O'Sullivan (0–4), K. Hennessy (0–2), J. Cashmna (0–1), P. Hartnett (0–1). | | T. Guilfoyle (2–2), G. McInerney (1–1), C. Lyons (0–4), S. Dolan (0–2), V. Donnellan (0–1), D. Coote (0–1), J. Shanahan (0–1). |

FitzGerald Stadium, Killarney
Attendance: 39,975
Referee: T. Murray (Limerick)

== All-Ireland Senior Hurling Championship ==
=== Bracket ===
Quarter-Finals
Galway | 4-24
Kerry | 1–03

Semi-Finals
Cork | 7-11
Antrim | 1–24
Galway | 4-12
Kilkenny | 0–13

Final
Cork | 4-13
Galway | 2–15

=== All-Ireland quarter-finals ===
19 July 1986
Quarter-Final

| Galway | 4–24 – 1–3 | Kerry |
|---|---|---|
| N. Lane (3–4), M. Connolly (1–2), P. Murphy (0–4), A. Cunningham (0–3), T. Kilkenny (0–2), B. Lynskey (0–2), J. Cooney (0–2), T. Keady (0–2), M. Naughton (0–2), M. McGrath (0–1). | | T. Nolan (1–1), J. Flaherty (0–1), D. J. Leahy (0–1). |

Cusack Park, Ennis
Referee: G. Kirwan (Offaly)

=== All-Ireland semi-finals ===
10 August 1986
Semi-Final

| Galway | 4–12 – 0–13 | Kilkenny |
|---|---|---|
| J. Cooney (2–2), A. Cunningham (1–3), N. Lane (1–1), M. Naughton (0–2), B. Lynskey (0–1), S. Mahon (0–1), T. Kilkenny (0–1), P. J. Molloy (0–1). | | J. Mulcahy (0–4), G. Fennelly (0–3), K. Brennan (0–2), H. Ryan (0–2), B. Fitzpatrick (0–1), R. Power (0–1). |

Semple Stadium, Thurles
Referee: T. Murray (Limerick)

10 August 1986
Semi-Final

| Cork | 7–11 – 1–24 | Antrim |
|---|---|---|
| J. Barry-Murphy (3–1), G. FitzGerald (2–1), T. Mulcahy (1–1), K. Hennessy (1–1), T. O'Sullivan (0–3), T. Cashman (0–2), J. Buckley (0–1), J. Cashman (0–1). | | P. McKillen (1–4), P. Boyle (0–5), D. Donnelly (0–4), O. Lavery (0–3), B. Donnelly (0–3), D. McNaughton (0–2), J. McKiernan (0–2), A. McCarry (0–1). |

Croke Park, Dublin
Attendance: 2,000
Referee: J. F. Bailey (Dublin)

=== All-Ireland Final ===
7 September 1986
Final

| Cork | 4–13 – 2–15 | Galway |
|---|---|---|
| K. Hennessy (2–1), J. Fenton (1–4), T. Mulcahy (1–1), K. Kingston (0–2), J. Barry-Murphy (0–2), T. O'Sullivan (0–1), G. FitzGerald (0–1), T. Cashman (0–1). | | T. Keady (0–5), J. Cooney (0–4), P. J. Molloy (1–1), J. Commins (1–0), M. Naughton (0–2), S. Mahon (0–1), P. Finnerty (0–1), P. Murphy (0–1). |

Croke Park, Dublin
Attendance: 63,451
Referee: J. F. Bailey (Dublin)

== Championship statistics ==
=== Scoring ===
- Hat-trick heroes:
  - First hat-trick of the championship: P. J. Cuddy for Laois against Offaly (Leinster semi-final)
  - Second hat-trick of the championship: Noel Lane for Galway against Kerry (All-Ireland quarter-final)
  - Third hat-trick of the championship: Jimmy Barry-Murphy for Cork against Antrim (All-Ireland semi-final)
- Widest winning margin: 30 points
  - Galway 4–24 : 1–3 Kerry (Leinster quarter-final)
- Most goals in a match: 8
  - Cork 7–11 : 1–24 Antrim (All-Ireland semi-final)
- Most points in a match: 39
  - Kilkenny 1–21 : 0–18 Wexford (Leinster quarter-final)
- Most goals by one team in a match: 7
  - Cork 7–11 : 1–24 Antrim (All-Ireland semi-final)
- Most goals scored by a losing team: 4
  - Laois 4–9 : 1–23 Offaly (Leinster semi-final)
- Most points scored by a winning team: 24
  - Galway 4–24 : 1–3 Kerry (Leinster quarter-final)
- Most points scored by a losing team: 24
  - Antrim 1–24 : 7–11 Cork (All-Ireland semi-final)

== Top scorers ==
=== Season ===
| Rank | Player | County | Tally | Total | Matches | Average |
|---|---|---|---|---|---|---|
| 1 | Jimmy Barry-Murphy | Cork | 5–5 | 20 | 4 | 5.00 |
| 1 | Kevin Hennessy | Cork | 5–5 | 20 | 4 | 5.00 |
| 3 | John Fenton | Cork | 1–15 | 18 | 3 | 6.00 |
| 4 | Noel Lane | Galway | 4–5 | 17 | 3 | 5.66 |
| 5 | Ger Fennelly | Kilkenny | 0–16 | 16 | 4 | 4.00 |
| 6 | Ger FitzGerald | Cork | 4–3 | 15 | 3 | 5.00 |
| 6 | Paddy Corrigan | Offaly | 0–15 | 15 | 2 | 7.50 |
| 8 | Liam Fennelly | Kilkenny | 4–2 | 14 | 4 | 3.50 |
| 8 | Eugene Fennelly | Laois | 2–8 | 14 | 2 | 7.00 |
| 8 | Joe Cooney | Galway | 2–8 | 14 | 3 | 4.66 |
| 8 | Tomás Mulcahy | Cork | 3–5 | 14 | 4 | 3.50 |

=== Single game ===
| Rank | Player | County | Tally | Total | Opposition |
|---|---|---|---|---|---|
| 1 | Noel Lane | Galway | 3–4 | 13 | Kerry |
| 2 | Jimmy Barry-Murphy | Cork | 3–1 | 10 | Antrim |
| 2 | Liam Fennelly | Kilkenny | 3–1 | 10 | Offaly |
| 2 | Eugene Fennelly | Laois | 2–4 | 10 | Westmeath |
| 5 | P. J. Cuddy | Laois | 3–0 | 9 | Offaly |
| 5 | Paddy Corrigan | Offaly | 0–9 | 9 | Laois |
| 7 | Tommy Guilfoyle | Clare | 2–2 | 8 | Cork |
| 7 | Joe Cooney | Galway | 2–2 | 8 | Kilkenny |
| 7 | John Fenton | Cork | 0–8 | 8 | Clare |
| 10 | Ger FitzGerald | Cork | 2–1 | 7 | Waterford |
| 10 | Kevin Hennessy | Cork | 2–1 | 7 | Waterford |
| 10 | Ger FitzGerald | Cork | 2–1 | 7 | Antrim |
| 10 | Kevin Hennessy | Cork | 2–1 | 7 | Galway |
| 10 | John Fenton | Cork | 1–4 | 7 | Galway |
| 10 | Paul McKillen | Antrim | 1–4 | 7 | Cork |
| 10 | Paddy Kelly | Limerick | 0–7 | 7 | Clare |

== See also ==
- Video of the final
