= List of shipwrecks in April 1830 =

The list of shipwrecks in April 1830 includes ships sunk, foundered, grounded, or otherwise lost during April 1830.

== 1 April ==
List of shipwrecks: 1 April 1830
Ship	State	Description
Friends Goodwill	United Kingdom	The ship was lost near Falmouth, Cornwall with the loss of all hands.

== 2 April ==
List of shipwrecks: 2 April 1830
Ship	State	Description
Bramsty	United Kingdom	The ship was wrecked on the coast of Yucatán, Mexico. Her crew were rescued. She was on a voyage from Liverpool to Tampico, Mexico.
Hope	United Kingdom	The schooner foundered in the Irish Sea off the Tuskar Rock with the loss of three of the seven people on board. She was on a voyage from Swansea, Glamorgan to Chester, Cheshire.

== 4 April ==
List of shipwrecks: 4 April 1830
Ship	State	Description
Unanimity	United Kingdom	The ship sprang a leak and was abandoned in the North Sea. Her eleven crew were rescued by Provesteen (Norway). Unanimity was on a voyage from Newcastle upon Tyne, Northumberland to Kiel, Duchy of Schleswig.

== 6 April ==
List of shipwrecks: 6 April 1830
Ship	State	Description
Atlantic	United Kingdom	The ship departed New Orleans, Louisiana, United States, for Liverpool, Lancashire, England. No further trace, presumed foundered with the loss of all hands.

== 8 April ==
List of shipwrecks: 8 April 1830
Ship	State	Description
Edora	United Kingdom	The ship was driven ashore on Stroma, Caithness. She was on a voyage from Leith, Lothian to Corfu, Greece.

== 9 April ==
List of shipwrecks: 9 April 1830
Ship	State	Description
Thetis	United Kingdom	The ship struck a rock and sank off Stroma, Caithness. She was on a voyage from Hull, Yorkshire to Quebec City, Lower Canada, British North America.

== 10 April ==
List of shipwrecks: 10 April 1830
Ship	State	Description
London and Berwick	United Kingdom	The ship was sunk by ice 30 nautical miles (56 km) off Memel, Prussia. She was on a voyage from London to Memel.

== 11 April ==
List of shipwrecks: 11 April 1830
Ship	State	Description
Jane	United States	The ship collided with Alicia (United Kingdom) in the Atlantic Ocean off the Nantucket Shoals and foundered. She was on a voyage from Virginia to Halifax, Nova Scotia, British North America.

== 12 April ==
List of shipwrecks: 12 April 1830
Ship	State	Description
Three Brothers	United Kingdom	The ship struck a rock and sank off Padstow, Cornwall. Her crew were rescued.
Margaret	United Kingdom	The ship was wrecked in the Bay of Cape Palos. She was on a voyage from Alicante to Dublin, United Kingdom.

== 15 April ==
List of shipwrecks: 15 April 1830
Ship	State	Description
Harmony	United Kingdom	The brig was driven ashore and wrecked on the west coast of Bermuda. All on board were rescued. She was on a voyage from Jamaica to Leith, Lothian.
Lord Blaney	United Kingdom	The steamship ran aground on a rock in Carlingford Lough.

== 16 April ==
List of shipwrecks: 16 April 1830
Ship	State	Description
Newry	United Kingdom	The brig was wrecked near Pwllheli, Caernarfonshire with the loss of about 20 lives.

== 17 April ==
List of shipwrecks: 17 April 1830
Ship	State	Description
Union	United Kingdom	The brig was run into by Ann (United Kingdom) and sank in Loch Indaal with the loss of five of her eight crew.
Zealous	United Kingdom	The brig was wrecked near Ballyglass, County Mayo. Her crew were rescued.

== 18 April ==
List of shipwrecks: 18 April 1830
Ship	State	Description
Scotia	United Kingdom	The ship was driven ashore on Skagen, Denmark. She was refloated on 21 April and taken in to Helsingør.

== 20 April ==
List of shipwrecks: 20 April 1830
Ship	State	Description
Nymph	United Kingdom	The ship was lost in the North Sea off Scheveningen, South Holland, Netherlands with the loss of her captain. She was on a voyage from Rotterdam, South Holland to "Southton".
Three Sisters	United Kingdom	The ship foundered in The Wash off King's Lynn, Norfolk with the loss of two of her crew.

== 22 April ==
List of shipwrecks: 22 April 1830
Ship	State	Description
Edward	United Kingdom	The sloop was wrecked near Aberavon, Glamorgan with the loss of eight of the ten people on board. She was on a voyage from Bristol, Gloucestershire to Cork.

== 23 April ==
List of shipwrecks: 23 April 1830
Ship	State	Description
Heyden	United Kingdom	The ship was driven ashore and wrecked in Whitesand Bay. Her crew were rescued.
Katherine	United Kingdom	The ship was wrecked at Valparaíso, Chile.

== 24 April ==
List of shipwrecks: 24 April 1830
Ship	State	Description
Margaret Ann	United Kingdom	The ship foundered in the Irish Sea. She was on a voyage from Dundalk to Liverpool, Lancashire.

== 25 April ==
List of shipwrecks: 25 April 1830
Ship	State	Description
Cynthia	United Kingdom	The ship was wrecked near "Wingo", Sweden. She was on a voyage from Rotterdam, South Holland, United Kingdom of the Netherlands to Helsingør, Denmark.
Montevidiano	Uruguay	The ship was wrecked in the Bay of Santa Rosa. She was on a voyage from Rosario, Argentina to Montevideo.

== 27 April ==
List of shipwrecks: 27 April 1830
Ship	State	Description
Amity	United Kingdom	The ship was sunk by ice off Memel, Prussia. She was on a voyage from London to Memel.
Rambler	United Kingdom	The ship was wrecked on Fehmarn, Duchy of Schleswig. She was on a voyage from Newcastle upon Tyne, Northumberland to Kiel, Duchy of Schleswig.

== 30 April ==
List of shipwrecks: 30 April 1830
Ship	State	Description
Mary Ann	United Kingdom	The ship was wrecked on Anholt, Denmark. She was on a voyage from Newcastle upon Tyne, Northumberland to Copenhagen.

== Unknown date ==
List of shipwrecks: Unknown date 1830
Ship	State	Description
Assulli and Anna	Norway	The ship was wrecked on Stroma, Caithness, United Kingdom. She was on a voyage from Arendal to the Isle of Man.
Cunningham	United Kingdom	The ship was lost off the Isle of Man.
Friends	United Kingdom	The ship sprang a leak and put into Holyhead, Anglesey, where she sank. She was on a voyage from Poole, Dorset to Liverpool, Lancashire.
Harmony	United Kingdom	The ship was wrecked off Bermuda.
Termagant	United Kingdom	The ship was run down and sunk in the River Mersey by the steamship Nottingham (United Kingdom.
