= 1985 Munster Senior Hurling Championship final =

- Event: 1985 Munster Senior Hurling Championship
Cork	Tipperary
4-17	4-11
- Date: 7 July 1985
- Venue: Páirc Uí Chaoimh, Cork
- Referee: J. Moore (Waterford)
- Attendance: 49,691

The 1985 Munster Senior Hurling Championship final was a hurling match played on Sunday 7 July 1985 at Páirc Uí Chaoimh, Cork, County Cork. It was contested by Cork and Tipperary. Cork, captained by Ger Cunningham, claimed the title, beating Tipperary on a scoreline of 4–17 to 4–11. This was the first decider since the Centenary Munster Final.

== Match ==
=== Details ===
7 July
Final

Cork	4–17 – 4–11	Tipperary
J. Fenton (1–6), J. Barry-Murphy (1–3), D. Walsh (1–2), T. Mulcahy (1–0), T. O'Sullivan (0–3), K. Hennessy (0–1), P. Horgan (0–1), D. Mac Curtain (0–1).		N. English (2–3), G. O'Neill (1–3), L. Maher (1–0), A. Ryan (0–1), S. Power (0–1), B. Ryan (0–1), I. Conroy (0–1), G. Stapleton (0–1).

Páirc Uí Chaoimh, Cork
Attendance: 49,691
Referee: J. Moore (Waterford)
