= 1987 All-Ireland Senior Hurling Championship =

Championship details
- Dates: 24 May – 6 September 1987
- Teams: 15

All-Ireland champions
- Winning team: Galway (3rd win)
- Captain: Conor Hayes
- Manager: Cyril Farrell

All-Ireland Finalists
- Losing team: Kilkenny
- Captain: Paddy Prendergast
- Manager: Pat Henderson

Provincial champions
- Munster: Tipperary
- Leinster: Kilkenny
- Ulster: Not Played
- Connacht: Not Played

Championship statistics
- No. matches played: 17
- Goals total: 61 (3.58 per game)
- Points total: 500 (29.41 per game)
- Top Scorer: Pat Fox (3–45)
- Player of the Year: Joe Cooney
- All-Star Team: See here

The 1987 All-Ireland Senior Hurling Championship was the 101st staging of the All-Ireland Senior Hurling Championship, the Gaelic Athletic Association's premier inter-county hurling tournament. The championship began on 24 May 1987 and ended on 6 September 1987.

Cork were the defending champions but were defeated by Tipperary in the Munster final. Kerry fielded a team in the provincial championship for the first time since 1978.

On 6 September 1987, Galway won the championship following a 1–12 to 0–9 defeat of Kilkenny in the 100th All-Ireland final. This was their third All-Ireland title, their first in seven championship seasons.

Tipperary's Pat Fox was the championship's top scorer with 3–45. Galway's Joe Cooney was the choice for Texaco Hurler of the Year.

== Team changes ==
=== To Championship ===
Qualified from the All-Ireland Senior B Hurling Championship

- London

=== From Championship ===
Relegated to the All-Ireland Senior B Hurling Championship

- None

== Teams ==
=== General information ===
Fifteen counties will compete in the All-Ireland Senior Hurling Championship: one team from the Connacht Senior Hurling Championship, six teams in the Leinster Senior Hurling Championship, six teams in the Munster Senior Hurling Championship, one team from the Ulster Senior Hurling Championship and one team from the All-Ireland Senior B Hurling Championship.

County	Last provincial title	Last championship title	Position in 1986 Championship	Current championship
Antrim	1946	—		Ulster Senior Hurling Championship
Clare	1932	1914		Munster Senior Hurling Championship
Cork	1986	1986		Munster Senior Hurling Championship
Dublin	1961	1938		Leinster Senior Hurling Championship
Galway	1922	1980		Connacht Senior Hurling Championship
London	—	1901		All-Ireland Senior B Hurling Championship
Kerry	1891	1891		Munster Senior Hurling Championship
Kilkenny	1986	1983		Leinster Senior Hurling Championship
Laois	1949	1915		Leinster Senior Hurling Championship
Limerick	1981	1973		Munster Senior Hurling Championship
Offaly	1985	1985		Leinster Senior Hurling Championship
Tipperary	1971	1971		Munster Senior Hurling Championship
Waterford	1963	1959		Munster Senior Hurling Championship
Westmeath	—	—		Leinster Senior Hurling Championship
Wexford	1977	1968		Leinster Senior Hurling Championship

== Provincial championships ==
=== Leinster Senior Hurling Championship ===
31 May
Quarter-Final

Kilkenny	4–20 – 4–5	Westmeath
C. Heffernan (2–5), K. Brennan (1–2), P. Walsh (1–2), L. Fennelly (0–3), H. Ryan (0–3), L. McCarthy (0–3), G. Fennelly (0–2).		D. Kilcoyne (2–1), S. Kilcoyne (2–1), E. Gallagher (0–1), P. Clancy (0–1), M. Kennedy (0–1).

O'Moore Park, Portlaoise
Attendance: 10,127
Referee: G. Kirwan (Offaly)

31 May
Quarter-Final

Offaly	2–18 – 1–13	Dublin
M. Corrigan (0–7), P. Cleary (1–3), J. Dooley (1–1), D. Fogarty (0–3), B. Keeshan (0–2), S. Coughlan (0–1), D. Owens (0–1).		N. Howard (1–5), M. J. Ryan (0–2), J. Murphy (0–2), S. Dalton (0–1), B. McMahon (0–1), G. Hegarty (0–1), P. Pringle (0–1).

O'Moore Park, Portlaoise
Attendance: 10,127
Referee: P. Delaney (Laois)

21 June
Semi-final

Offaly	1–16 – 0–13	Laois
M. Corrigan (0–7), S. Coughlan (1–1), B. Keeshan (0–3), P. Cleary (0–2), P. Corrigan (0–1), J. Dooley (0–1), J. Kelly (0–1).		B. Bohane (0–5), M. O'Sullivan (0–3), S. Plunkett (0–2), E. Fennelly (0–1), P. Cleary (0–1), P. O'Brien (0–1).

Croke Park, Dublin
Attendance: 35,719
Referee: J. Denton (Wexford)

21 June
Semi-final

Kilkenny	3–20 – 2–15	Wexford
H. Ryan (1–4), L. McCarthy (1–3), L. Fennelly (1–1), G. Fennelly (0–4), C. Heffernan (0–3), P. Walsh (0–2), S. Fennelly (0–2), L. Ryan (0–1).		J. Houlihan (0–9), T. Dempsey (1–1), S. Fitzhenry (1–0), M. Quigley (0–2), G. O'Connor (0–2), J. McDonald (0–1).

Croke Park, Dublin
Attendance: 35,719
Referee: N. O'Donoghue (Dublin)

2 August
Final

Kilkenny	2–14 – 0–17	Offaly
G. Fennelly (0–9), L. Fennelly (2–0), H. Ryan (0–1), K. Brennan (0–1), T. Lennon (0–1), C. Heffernan (0–1), R. Power (0–1).		D. Fogarty (0–3), B. Keeshan (0–3), M. Corrigan (0–2), P. Cleary (0–2), J. Kelly (0–2), D. Owens (0–2), P. Connors (0–1), J. Dooley (0–1), P. Corrigan (0–1).

Croke Park, Dublin
Attendance: 29,133
Referee: P. Delaney (Laois)

=== Munster Senior Hurling Championship ===
24 May
Quarter-Final

Kerry	2–6 – 1–21	Tipperary
J. Hennessy (1–1), B. Neenan (1–0), E. Murphy (0–3), S. Sheahan (0–1), C. Nolan (0–1).		P. Fox (1–10), M. Scully (0–3), C. Bonnar (0–2), A. Ryan (0–2), L. Stokes (0–2), M. Doley (0–1), D. O'Connell (0–1).

FitzGerald Stadium, Killarney
Attendance: 1,500
Referee: F. Murphy (Cork)

24 May
Quarter-Final

Limerick	2–15 – 1–14	Waterford
P. Kelly (0–10), D. FitzGerald (1–0), S. Fitzgibbon (1–0), T. Kenny (0–2), P. McCarthy (0–1), G. Kirby (0–1), A. Carmody (0–1).		K. Delahunty (0–8), P. Bennett (1–0), P. Ryan (0–2), N. Crowley (0–2), M. Walsh (0–1), B. Power (0–1).

Semple Stadium, Thurles
Attendance: 9,537
Referee: G. Ryan (Tipperary)

7 June
Semi-final

Tipperary	1–13 – 1–13	Clare
P. Fox (0–7), N. English (1–3), A. Ryan (0–2), J. McGrath (0–1).		C. Lyons (0–8), G. McInenrey (1–0), T. Guilfoyle (0–3). M. Guilfoyle (0–1), J. Shanahan (0–1).

FitzGerald Stadium, Killarney
Attendance: 18,000
Referee: T. Murray (Limerick)

14 June
Semi-final

Cork	3–11 – 3–11	Limerick
K. Kingston (2–1), J. Fenton (0–5), J. Fitzgibbon (1–0), T. O'Sullivan (0–3), G. FitzGerald (0–1), T. McCarthy (0–1).		P. McCarthy (1–3), S. Fitzginnon (1–1), P. Kelly (0–5), A. Carmody (0–1), J. Carroll (0–1).

Semple Stadium, Thurles
Attendance: 26,000
Referee: J. Moore (Waterford)

21 June
Semi-final Replay

Tipperary	4–17 – 0–8	Clare
N. English (2–4), P. Fox (0–7), B. Ryan (1–1), D. O'Connell (1–0), A. Ryan (0–3), R. Stakelum (0–1), P. Hayes (0–1).		A. Cunningham (0–2), C. Lyons (0–2), M. Guilfoyle (0–2), G. O'Loughlin (0–1).

FitzGerald Stadium, Killarney
Attendance: 23,000
Referee: T. Murray (Limerick)

28 June
Semi-final Replay

Cork	3–14 – 0–10	Limerick
J. Fenton (1–8), K. Hennessy (1–2), K. Fitzgibbon (1–0), T. McCarthy (0–2), T. O'Sullivan (0–1), J. Cashman (0–1).		P. Kelly (0–3), D. FitzGerald (0–2), O. O'Connor (0–2), P. McCarthy (0–1), D. Punch (0–1), G. Hegarty (0–1).

Semple Stadium, Thurles
Attendance: 35,000
Referee: J. Moore (Waterford)

12 July
Final

Tipperary	1–18 – 1–18	Cork
P. Fox (0–9), N. English (1–1), D. O'Donnell (0–4), A. Ryan (0–2), R. Stakelum (0–1), J. McGrath (0–1).		J. Fenton (0–12), T. O'Sullivan (0–4), K. Kingston (1–0), K. Hennessy (0–1), T. McCarthy (0–1).

Semple Stadium, Thurles
Attendance: 56,005
Referee: T. Murray (Limerick)

19 July
Final Replay

Tipperary	4–22 – 1–22 (AET)	Cork
P. Fox (0–11), M. Doyle (2–0), N. English (1–1), D. O'Connell (1–1), M. McGrath (0–3), A. Ryan (0–3), P. Delaney (0–2), P. Fitzelle (0–1).		J. Fenton (0–13), T. Mulcahy (1–2), T. McCarthy (0–3), T. O'Sullivan (0–3), G. FitzGerald (0–1).

FitzGerald Stadium, Killarney
Attendance: 45,000
Referee: T. Murray (Limerick)

== All-Ireland Senior Hurling Championship ==
=== Bracket ===
Quarter-Finals
Antrim	3–14
London	1–15

Semi-Finals
Galway	3–20
Tipperary	2–17
Kilkenny	2–18
Antrim	2–11

Final
Galway	1–12
Kilkenny	0–09

=== All-Ireland quarter-finals ===
19 July
Quarter-Final

Antrim	3–14 – 1–15	London
D. McNaughton (1–5), B. Donnelly (2–1), D. Donnelly (0–3), P. McKillen (0–3), T. McGrath (0–1), T. McNaughton (0–1).		M. Jordan (1–2), M. Burke (0–4), P. Hoctor (0–3), J. Murphy (0–3), G. Ryan (0–2), C. Aherne (0–1).

Casement Park, Belfast

=== All-Ireland semi-finals ===
9 August
Semi-final

Galway	3–20 – 2–17	Tipperary
E. Ryan (1–4), J. Cooney (0–6), M. Naughton (1–0), N. Lane (1–0), A. Cunningham (0–3), S. Mahon (0–3), M. McGrath (0–3), B. Lynskey (0–1).	Report	P. Fox (2–1), N. English (0–6), P. Delaney (0–3), M. McGrath (0–2), D. O'Connell (0–2), A. Ryan (0–2), J. Hayes (0–1).

Croke Park, Dublin
Attendance: 49,410
Referee: G. Kirwan (Offaly)

16 August
Semi-final

Kilkenny	2–18 – 2–11	Antrim
H. Ryan (2–5), G. Fennelly (0–7), K. Brennan (0–3), T. Lennon (0–1), C. Heffernan (0–1), R. Power (0–1).		D. McNaughton (2–1), D. Donnelly (0–6), T. McNaughton (0–2), B. Donnelly (0–1), P. McKillen (0–1).

St. Brigid's Park, Dundalk, County Louth
Attendance: 4,962
Referee: T. Murray (Limerick)

=== All-Ireland Final ===
6 September
Final

Galway	1–12 – 0–9	Kilkenny
J. Cooney (0–5), N. Lane (1–0), T. Keady (0–2), S. Mahon (0–2), M. Naughton (0–1), A. Cunningham (0–1), M. McGrath (0–1).		G. Fennelly (0–7), H. Ryan (0–1), T. Lennon (0–1).

Croke Park, Dublin
Attendance: 65,586
Referee: T. Murray (Limerick)

== Championship statistics ==
=== Miscellaneous ===
- Kerry take part in the Munster series of games for the first time since 1978.
- In the Munster semi-final replay against Limerick, Cork's John Fenton scored, what is often regarded as, one of the greatest hurling goals of all-time. Playing in his usual midfield position he struck the sliotar on the ground and scored a goal from forty-five yards out. In 2005 this goal was listed as one of RTÉ's Top 20 GAA Moments and, in a TG4 poll in 2009 it was voted the second greatest hurling goal of all-time.
- At the Munster final between Cork and Tipperary the official attendance is given as 56,005. Two gates, however, were broken down before the start of the game and an estimated 3,000 people gained free entry to the Killinan terrace.
- The Leinster final between Kilkenny and Offaly is postponed due to damage to the Croke Park pitch following a U2 concert in June.

=== Top scorers ===
Overall

Rank	Player	County	Tally	Total	Matches	Average
1	Pat Fox	Tipperary	3–45	54	6	9.00
2	John Fenton	Cork	1–38	41	4	10.25
3	Nicky English	Tipperary	5–15	30	6	5.00
4	Ger Fennelly	Kilkenny	0–29	29	5	5.80
5	Harry Ryan	Kilkenny	3–14	23	5	4.60
6	Paddy Kelly	Limerick	0–18	18	3	6.00
7	Christy Heffernan	Kilkenny	2–10	16	4	4.00
7	Mark Corrigan	Offaly	0–16	16	3	5.33
9	Danny McNaughton	Antrim	3–6	15	2	7.50
10	Liam Fennelly	Kilkenny	3–4	13	5	2.60

Single game

Rank	Player	County	Tally	Total	Opposition
1	Pat Fox	Tipperary	1–10	13	Kerry
1	John Fenton	Cork	0–13	13	Tipperary
3	John Fenton	Cork	0–12	12	Tipperary
4	Christy Heffernan	Kilkenny	2–5	11	Westmeath
4	Harry Ryan	Kilkenny	2–5	11	Antrim
4	John Fenton	Cork	1–8	11	Limerick
4	Pat Fox	Tipperary	0–11	11	Cork
8	Nicky English	Tipperary	2–4	10	Clare
8	Paddy Kelly	Limerick	0–10	10	Waterford
10	Ger Fennelly	Kilkenny	0–9	9	Offaly
10	Pat Fox	Tipperary	0–9	9	Cork
10	John Houlihan	Wexford	0–9	9	Kilkenny

=== Clean sheets ===
Rank	Goalkeeper	County	Clean sheets
1	Jim Troy	Offaly	1
1	Kevin Fennelly	Kilkenny	1
1	Ken Hogan	Tipperary	1
1	Ger Cunningham	Cork	1
1	John Commins	Galway	1
