= 1983 Munster Senior Hurling Championship final =

Hurling match played in Ireland

- Event: 1983 Munster Senior Hurling Championship
Cork	Waterford
3-22	0-12
- Date: 10 July 1983
- Venue: Gaelic Grounds, Limerick
- Referee: N. Duggan (Limerick)
- Attendance: 20,816

The 1983 Munster Senior Hurling Championship final was a hurling match played on Sunday 10 July at the Gaelic Grounds in Limerick. It was contested by Cork and Waterford. Cork, captained by Jimmy Barry-Murphy, claimed the title, beating Waterford on a scoreline of 3-22 to 0-12. This was the last decider before the Centenary Munster Final.

== Match ==
=== Details ===
10 July
Final

Cork	3–22 – 0–12	Waterford
J. Barry-Murphy (1–5), E. O'Donoghue (2–0), K. Hennessy (0–5), J. Buckley (0–3), T. Cashman (0–2), T. O'Sullivan (0–2), B. Óg Murphy (0–2), T. Mulcahy (0–1).		P. McGrath (0–5), J. Hennebry (0–2), T. Casey (0–2), Michael Walsh (0–1), S. Breen (0–1), Mossie Walsh (0–1).

Gaelic Grounds, Limerick
Attendance: 20,816
Referee: N. Duggan (Limerick)
