= Tomás Mulcahy =

Cork hurler and Gaelic footballer

Personal information
- Native name: Tomás Ó Maolcatha (Irish)
- Nickname: Mul
- Born: 26 June 1963 (age 63) Knocknaheeney, Cork, Ireland
- Occupation: Financial consultant
- Height: 6 ft 2 in (188 cm)

Sport
- Sport: Hurling
- Position: Right corner-forward
Club
Years	Club	Apps (scores)
1982–1998	Glen Rovers	51 (18–43)
Club titles
- Cork titles: 1
Inter-county*
Years	County	Apps (scores)
1983–1994	Cork	32 (11–23)
Inter-county titles
- Munster titles: 6
- All-Irelands: 3
- NHL: 1
- All Stars: 2
- *Inter County team apps and scores correct as of 13:54, 3 July 2015.

Tomás Mulcahy (born 26 June 1963) is an Irish former hurler and Gaelic footballer who played as a right corner-forward at senior level for the Cork county team.

Born in Knocknaheeney, Cork, Mulcahy first played competitive Gaelic games during his schooling at the North Monastery. He arrived on the inter-county scene at the age of seventeen when he first linked up with the Cork minor teams as a dual player before later joining the under-21 sides. He made his senior hurling debut during the 1983 championship. Mulcahy immediately became a regular member of the starting fifteen and won three All-Ireland medals, five Munster medals and one National Hurling League medal. The All-Ireland-winning captain of 1990, he was an All-Ireland runner-up on two occasions.

As a member of the Munster inter-provincial team on a number of occasions, Mulcahy won two Railway Cup medals. At club level he is a one-time championship medallist with Glen Rovers.

Mulcahy's father, Gerald Mulcahy, also played for Cork.

Throughout his career Mulcahy made 27 championship appearances. His retirement came following the conclusion of the 1994 championship.

In retirement from playing Mulcahy became involved in team management and coaching. At inter-county level he served as a selector with the Cork under-21 team as well as coaching the Glen Rovers and Lismore senior teams. Mulcahy has also worked as an analyst with The Sunday Game.

Mulcahy is widely regarded as one of the legends of Cork hurling. During his playing days he won two All-Star awards. Mulcahy was also chosen as one of the 125 greatest hurlers of all time in a 2009 poll, while he was also selected as one of Cork's greatest players of the era in a 2013 selection.

== Playing career ==
=== Glen Rovers ===
Mulcahy was born and raised in the Shandon area on the northside of Cork. After progressing through the ranks in local street leagues, he first made an impression as a schoolboy dual player at the North Monastery. Mulcahy enjoyed a hugely successful final year in 1980, winning Harty Cup and Croke Cup titles with the hurling team and a Frewen Cup with the Gaelic football team. He simultaneously came to prominence at juvenile and underage levels with the Glen Rovers club.

Mulcahy made his first appearance with the Glen Rovers senior team in a second round defeat of Carrigdhoun in the 1982 Cork SHC. The early stages of his senior career coincided with a lean period in terms of success. In spite of this, Mulcahy captained the Glen Rovers under-21 team to the Cork U21HC title in 1984 in what was his last game in the grade. He was elected captain of the Glen Rovers senior team in December 1987. Mulcahy's first season as team captain saw Glen Rovers reach a first Cork SHC final in seven years, only to lose to St. Finbarr's by seven points. He retained the captaincy the following year and guided Glen Rovers to a first Cork SHC title in 13 years after a 4–15 to 3–13 win over Sarsfields in the 1989 Cork SHC final.

Mulcahy had stepped down from the captaincy by the time the Glen were beaten by Midleton in the 1991 Cork SHC final. It was his last big occasion with the Glen Rovers senior team. Mulcahy continued to line out with the team for a number of seasons and eventually brought an end to his club career after a defeat by Blackrock in the 1998 Cork SHC semi-final.

=== Cork ===
Mulcahy first played for Cork as a member of the minor hurling team on 10 July 1980. He scored a point from left corner-forward on his debut in a 1–14 to 1–7 Munster semi-final defeat by Tipperary. The following year Mulcahy was also included on the Cork minor football team.

By 1982 Mulcahy had joined the Cork under-21 hurling team, however, he failed to make the starting fifteen. In spite of this he won a Munster medal when came on as a substitute in the 1–14 to 1–4 provincial decider defeat of Limerick. On 12 September 1982 Cork faced Galway in the All-Ireland decider, however, Mulcahy started the game on the bench before being introduced as a substitute. Cork came from behind in the closing stages to win by a single point scored from long range by Kevin Hennessy. The 0–12 to 0–11 victory gave Mulcahy an All-Ireland medal.

Mulcahy made his senior hurling championship debut for Cork on 26 June 1983 when he came on as a substitute in a 1–14 to 1–12 Munster semi-final replay defeat of Limerick. He was added to the starting fifteen at right corner-forward for the subsequent provincial decider against Waterford. Mulcahy scored a point and collected his first Munster medal following a huge 3–22 to 0–12 victory. The All-Ireland final on 4 September 1983 was a replay of the previous year with Cork hoping to avenge the defeat by Kilkenny. Billy Fitzpatrick was the star with ten points, giving Kilkenny a 2–14 to 1–9 lead with seventeen minutes left, however, they failed to score for the remainder of the game. A stunning comeback by Cork just fell short and Mulchay's side were defeated by 2–14 to 2–12.

Cork were the dominant force in Munster once again in 1984, with Mulcahy winning a second successive Munster medal following a memorable 4–15 to 3–14 defeat of Tipperary in the provincial showpiece. The subsequent All-Ireland final on 2 September 1984, played at Semple Stadium in Thurles, saw Cork take on Offaly for the first time ever in championship history. The centenary-year final failed to live up to expectations and Cork recorded a relatively easy 3–16 to 1–12 victory. It was Mulcahy's first All-Ireland medal. He was later honoured with an All-Star.

In 1985 Mulcahy added a third successive Munster medal to his collection as Cork defeated Tipperary by 4–17 to 4–11 in the provincial decider once again.

Cork made it five-in-a-row in Munster in 1986 as they defeated Clare by 2–18 to 3–12 to take the provincial title. It was Mulcahy's fourth successive Munster medal. This victory paved the way for an All-Ireland final meeting with Galway on 7 September 1986. The men from the west were the red-hot favourites against a Cork team in decline, however, on the day a different story unfolded. Four Cork goals, one from John Fenton, two from Mulcahy and one from Kevin Hennessy, stymied the Galway attack and helped the Rebels to a 4–13 to 2–15 victory. It was Mulcahy's second All-Ireland medal while a second All-Star quickly followed.

After two lackluster championship campaigns by Cork in 1987 and 1988, Mulcahy was dropped from the team in 1989. Glen Rovers's club success at the end of that year paved the way for a return to the Cork team when the club nominated Mulcahy for the county captaincy in 1990. An injury resulted in him missing Cork's successful provincial campaign, however, he made his first championship appearance in over two years in Cork's All-Ireland semi-final defeat of Antrim. The subsequent All-Ireland final on 2 September 1990 pitted Cork against Galway for the second time in four years. Galway were once again the red-hot favourites and justified this tag by going seven points ahead in the opening thirty-five minutes thanks to a masterful display by Joe Cooney. Cork fought back with an equally expert display by Mulcahy. The game was effectively decided on an incident which occurred midway through the second half when Cork goalkeeper Ger Cunningham blocked a point-blank shot from Martin Naughton with his nose. The umpires gave no 65-metre free, even though he clearly deflected it out wide. Cork went on to win a high-scoring and open game of hurling by 5–15 to 2–21. As well as winning a third All-Ireland medal Mulcahy also had the honour of lifting the Liam MacCarthy Cup.

Cork surrendered their titles in 1991, however, Mulcahy claimed his fifth Munster medal in 1992 following a 1–22 to 3–11 of Limerick. On 6 September 1992 Cork faced Kilkenny in the All-Ireland decider. At half-time Cork were two points ahead, however, two second-half goals by John Power and Michael "Titch" Phelan supplemented a first-half D. J. Carey penalty which gave Kilkenny a 3–10 to 1–12 victory.

Mulcahy won a National Hurling League in 1993 following a 3–11 to 1–12 defeat of Wexford. He was later dropped form Cork's championship panel.

In 1994 Mulcahy returned to the Cork starting fifteen at centre-forward. A 4–14 to 4–11 Munsterquarter-final defeat on 5 June 1994 brought the curtain down on his inter-county career.

=== Munster ===
Mulcahy was first picked for the Munster inter-provincial team in 1984, however, he started the game on the bench. After being introduced as a substitute for Cork teammate Kevin Hennessy, Mulcahy went on to claim his first Railway Cup medal following a 2–9 to 1–18 defeat of arch rivals Leinster.

In 1985 Mulcahy was included on the starting fifteen as part of an all Cork full-forward line. A narrow 3–6 to 1–11 defeat of Connacht gave Mulcahy a second Railway Cup medal.

== Coaching career ==
Mulcahy cut his teeth as part of a management team when he served as a selector under Seán O'Gorman with the Cork under-21 team. In this capacity he helped steer the team to a Munster title in 2005 following a 4–8 to 0–13 defeat of Tipperary.

In late 2006 he was appointed manager of the Glen Rovers senior team. Initially for a two-year term, he was granted an extension of a third year. During his tenure the Glen Rovers threatened a long-overdue breakthrough by reaching three consecutive championship quarter-finals as well as losing the 2008 semi-final by four points to Sarsfields.

Mulcahy later took over as manager of the Lismore senior team in Waterford, however, he ended his tenure without any major success.

On a number of occasions Mulcahy has been tipped as a possible manager of the Cork senior team.

== Media career ==
Immediately after his retirement from inter-county hurling, Mulcahy joined RTÉ as an analyst in 1995. He has been a frequent contributor to Gaelic games coverage on radio and television, most notably on The Sunday Game.

In June 2021, he announced that he had left his position as an analyst with RTE after 25 years.

== Career statistics ==
=== Club ===
Team	Season	Cork		Munster		Total	
Team	Season	Apps	Score	Apps	Score	Apps	Score
Glen Rovers	1982	4	2-03	—		4	2-03
Glen Rovers	1983	3	1-04	—		3	1-04
Glen Rovers	1984	1	1-00	—		1	1-00
Glen Rovers	1985	3	0-02	—		3	0-02
Glen Rovers	1986	2	1-04	—		2	1-04
Glen Rovers	1987	3	0-05	—		3	0-05
Glen Rovers	1988	4	3-04	—		4	3-04
Glen Rovers	1989	4	4-04	2	0-00	6	4-04
Glen Rovers	1990	2	1-00	—		2	1-00
Glen Rovers	1991	4	0-01	—		4	0-01
Glen Rovers	1992	2	0-02	—		2	0-02
Glen Rovers	1993	1	0-01	—		1	0-01
Glen Rovers	1994	3	2-00	—		3	2-00
Glen Rovers	1995	1	0-01	—		1	0-01
Glen Rovers	1996	6	3-08	—		6	3-08
Glen Rovers	1997	1	0-01	—		1	0-01
Glen Rovers	1998	5	0-03	—		5	0-03
Career total		49	18-43	2	0-00	51	18-43

=== Inter-county ===
Team	Year	National League			Munster		All-Ireland		Total	
Team	Year	Division	Apps	Score	Apps	Score	Apps	Score	Apps	Score
Cork	1982-83	Division 1	0	0-00	2	0-01	2	3-00	4	3-01
Cork	1983-84	Division 1	7	3-01	2	0-00	2	0-01	11	3-02
Cork	1984-85	Division 1	5	2-02	2	1-00	1	0-00	8	3-02
Cork	1985-86	Division 1	4	2-01	2	1-03	2	2-02	8	5-06
Cork	1986-87	Division 1	7	7-02	4	1-03	—		11	8-05
Cork	1987-88	Division 1	3	0-00	2	0-00	—		5	0-00
Cork	1988-89	Division 2	0	0-00	0	0-00	—		0	0-00
Cork	1989-90	Division 1	7	3-07	0	0-00	2	1-04	9	4-11
Cork	1990-91	Division 1	5	0-03	3	0-01	—		8	0-04
Cork	1991-92	Division 1B	6	0-03	3	2-04	2	0-04	11	2-11
Cork	1992-93	Division 1B	8	2-03	—		—		8	2-03
Cork	1993-94	Division 1	7	1-08	1	0-00	—		8	1-08
Career total			59	20-30	21	5-12	11	6-11	91	31-53

== Honours ==
=== Player ===
North Monastery

- Croke Cup: 1980
- Harty Cup: 1980
- Frewen Cup: 1980

Glen Rovers

- Cork Senior Hurling Championship: 1989 (c)
- Cork Under-21 Hurling Championship: 1984 (c)

Cork

- All-Ireland Senior Hurling Championship: 1984, 1986, 1990 (c)
- Munster Senior Hurling Championship: 1983, 1984, 1985, 1986, 1990, 1992
- National Hurling League: 1992–93
- All-Ireland Under-21 Hurling Championship: 1982
- Munster Under-21 Hurling Championship: 1982

Munster

- Railway Cup: 1984, 1985

=== Management ===
Glen Rovers

- Cork Premier Senior Hurling Championship: 2026
- Cork Senior A Hurling Championship: 2024

Cork

- Munster Under-21 Hurling Championship: 2005

=== Individual ===
Honours

- The 125 greatest stars of the GAA: No. 114
- All-Star (2): 1984, 1986
- All-Ireland Senior Hurling Final Man of the Match (1): 1990

Sporting positions
Preceded by Ger Cunningham	Cork Senior Hurling Captain; 1990	Succeeded by Kieran McGuckin
Preceded by Kieran McGuckin	Cork Senior Hurling Captain; 1990	Succeeded by Tony O'Sullivan
Achievements
Preceded by Bobby Ryan	All-Ireland Senior Hurling Final winning captain 1990	Succeeded by Declan Carr
Awards
Preceded by Nicky English	All-Ireland Senior Hurling Final; Man of the Match; 1990	Succeeded by Pat Fox
