= Joe Cooney =

Galway hurler

Personal information
- Native name: Seosamh Ó Cuana (Irish)
- Born: 17 March 1965 (age 61) Bullaun, County Galway, Ireland
- Occupation: Farmer
- Height: 5 ft 11 in (180 cm)

Sport
- Sport: Hurling
- Position: Centre-forward
Club
- Years: Club
- 1981–2004: Sarsfields
Club titles
- Galway titles: 5
- Connacht titles: 5
- All-Ireland Titles: 2
Inter-county*
Years	County	Apps (scores)
1983–2000	Galway	35 (10–102)
Inter-county titles
- Connacht titles: 3
- All-Irelands: 2
- NHL: 3
- All Stars: 5
- *Inter County team apps and scores correct as of 16:16, 24 May 2014.

Joseph Cooney (born 17 March 1965) is an Irish former hurler who played as a centre-forward at senior level for the Galway county team.

Born in Bullaun, County Galway, Cooney first played competitive hurling during his schooling at St Raphael's College. He arrived on the inter-county scene at the age of seventeen when he first linked up with the Galway minor team, before later joining the under-21 side. He made his senior debut during the 1983 championship. Cooney immediately became a regular member of the starting fifteen and won two All-Ireland medals, three Connacht medals and three National Hurling League medals. He was an All-Ireland runner-up on four occasions.

As a member of the Connacht inter-provincial team on a number of occasions, Cooney won four Railway Cup medal. At club level he is a two-time All-Ireland medallist with Sarsfields. In addition to this he has also won three Connacht medals and five championship medals.

Cooney's brother, Jimmy, was also an All-Ireland medallist with Galway while his son, Joseph, also lined out with Galway.

His career tally of 10 goals and 102 points ranks him as Galway's fifth highest championship scorer of all time.

Throughout his career Cooney made 35 championship appearances. He announced his retirement from inter-county hurling on 24 January 2001.

During his playing days, Cooney won five All-Star awards in six seasons as well as being named Texaco Hurler of the Year in 1987. He has been repeatedly voted onto teams made up of the sport's greats, including at midfield on the Club Hurling Silver Jubilee Team and at centre-forward on the Galway Hurling Team of the Millennium and the Supreme All-Stars team. Cooney was also chosen as one of the 125 greatest hurlers of all time in a 2009 poll.

In May 2020, the Irish Independent named Cooney at number eleven in its "Top 20 hurlers in Ireland over the past 50 years".

== Early life ==
Joe Cooney was born in Bullaun, County Galway in 1965. The tenth child in a family of fourteen, he was educated locally and later at St. Raphael's secondary school in Loughrea. Here his hurling skills came to the fore and he was quickly spotted by the Galway inter-county selectors.

== Playing career ==
=== Club ===
Cooney played his club hurling with his local Sarsfields club. He first experienced success in 1984 when he won a county under-21 title. Five years later in 1989 Cooney captured his first senior county title before later winning a Connacht club title. In the subsequent All-Ireland semi-final Sarsfields played Ballyhale Shamrocks. It was an unprecedented occasion as five Cooney brothers lined out against seven Fennelly brothers from Ballyhale. Unfortunately for Cooney it was the Fennellys who ended up on the winning side on that occasion. 1992 saw Cooney win a second county title. He later captured a second Connacht club title before lining out in his first All-Ireland club final against Kilmallock. The game was very close for much of the hour, however, with five minutes to go Cooney sent a long-range free into the net to secure an All-Ireland club medal for himself. Sarsfields retained their county and provincial club titles in 1993 and Cooney later lined out in his second consecutive All-Ireland final. Once again Cooney proved to be one of the heroes of the game. A sixty-fifth-minute goal, set up by Cooney, gave Sarsfields the victory over Toomevara and gave Cooney his second All-Ireland club medal. Cooney added a fourth and a fifth county and Connacht club medal to his collection in 1995 and 1997.

=== Inter-county ===
Cooney first came to prominence on the inter-county scene as a member of the Galway minor hurling team in the early 1980s. He won an All-Ireland medal in this grade in 1983 after Galway defeated a Dublin team that contained a young Niall Quinn. Three years later in 1986 Cooney won an All-Ireland medal with the Galway under-21 team following a defeat of Wexford.

By this stage Cooney was also lining out with the Galway senior hurling team. He made his debut in 1985 and lined out in his very first senior All-Ireland final. Offaly provided the opposition on the day and the game was a close and exciting one. Cooney scored a goal towards the end, however, it was disallowed. This might have turned the game for Galway; however, Offaly went on to win on a score line of 2–11 to 1–12. In spite of losing the game Cooney was later presented with his first All-Star award. In 1986 Cooney lined out in his second All-Ireland final. Cork provided the opposition on that occasion, however, Galway were the red-hot favourites for the title. After an exciting game between the two sides Cork emerged victorious on a score line of 4–13 to 2–15. In spite of losing the championship decider for a second year in-a-row, Cooney's performance still earned him a second All-Star award. 1987 saw Cooney collect his first National Hurling League title before lining out in a third consecutive All-Ireland final. After a low-scoring game against Kilkenny Galway finally triumphed on a score line of 1–12 to 0-9 and Cooney collected his first senior All-Ireland medal. Once again he was presented with a third All-Star award.

In 1988 Cooney made his fourth consecutive appearance in the championship decider with Tipperary lining out against his side. Noel Lane, the goal-scoring hero of the previous year's final once again scored at a crucial time, giving Galway the victory and giving Cooney a second consecutive All-Ireland medal. In 1989 Cooney won a second National League title and Galway looked a good bet to win a third championship in-a-row. Unfortunately, star centre-back Tony Keady was controversially suspended from playing for a year. This set the tone for Galway's championship campaign and they were later dumped out of the championship by Tipperary in an ill-tempered All-Ireland semi-final. In spite of losing out Cooney still collected a fourth All-Star award.

In 1990 Cooney was appointed captain of the Galway team. That year his team reached a fifth championship decider in six seasons. Like 1986 Cork provided the opposition and, once again, Galway were regarded as the red-hot favourites. Cooney put in a brilliant performance in the first half and Galway went seven points up at one stage. In spite of this Cork fought back and won the game on a score line of 5–15 to 2-21. It was bitterly disappointing for Cooney; however, he was later presented with a fifth All-Star award. The following few years saw Galway's fortunes take a downturn. The team did make it to the All-Ireland final in 1993, however, Kilkenny emerged victorious on that occasion. The great Galway team of the 1980s was now after being broken up, however, Cooney continued playing and captured a third National League medal in 1996. In spite of this he had little other success and he retired from inter-county hurling in 2000.

=== Provincial ===
Cooney also lined out with Connacht in the Railway Cup inter-provincial competition. He captured his first winners’ medal in this competition in 1986 as Connacht defeated Munster. Cooney won further inter-provincial honours in 1987, 1989 and 1991.

== Personal life ==
Joe's eldest son Joseph was a member of the successful Galway minor hurling team of 2009. He played at wing-back in that game. Joseph was also a member of the Galway under 21 panel of 2010, which lost the final to Tipperary. Joseph has also won an all-Ireland vocational school title with St. Brigids of Loughrea and is currently a member of the Galway senior panel. He won the All-Ireland with Galway in 2017.

== Honours ==
=== Player ===
Sarsfields

- Galway Senior Hurling Championship (5): 1989, 1992, 1993, 1995, 1997
- Connacht Senior Club Hurling Championship (5): 1989, 1992, 1993, 1995, 1997
- All-Ireland Senior Club Hurling Championship (2): 1993, 1994

Galway

- All-Ireland Senior Hurling Championship (2): 1987, 1988
- Connacht Senior Hurling Championship (5): 1995, 1996, 1997, 1998, 1999
- National Hurling League (3): 1986-87, 1988-89, 1995-96
- All-Ireland Under-21 Hurling Championship (1): 1986
- All-Ireland Minor Hurling Championship (1): 1983

Connacht

- Railway Cup (4): 1986, 1987, 1989 (c), 1991

=== Individual ===
Awards

- Texaco Hurler of the Year (1): 1987
- All-Star (5): 1985, 1986, 1987, 1989, 1990
- All-Ireland Senior Hurling Championship Top Scorer (1): 1990
- Galway Hurling Team of the Millennium
- Club Hurling Silver Jubilee Team (1971–1996)

Awards
Preceded by Ger Cunningham (Cork)	Texaco Hurler of the Year; 1987	Succeeded by Tony Keady (Galway)
Achievements
Preceded by Aidan Fogarty (Leinster)	Interprovincial Hurling Final winning captain 1989	Succeeded by Pete Finnerty (Connacht)
Sporting positions
Preceded by Conor Hayes	Galway Senior Hurling Captain; 1990	Succeeded by
