= John Parker (cricketer, born c. 1823) =

Scottish cricketer

Personal information
- Full name: John Bartholomew Parker
- Born: c. 1823
- Died: 2 October 1892 (aged ~69); Edinburgh, Midlothian, Scotland
- Batting: Unknown
- Bowling: Unknown

Career statistics
Competition	First-class
Matches	5
Runs scored	26
Batting average	4.33
100s/50s	–/–
Top score	14
Balls bowled	193
Wickets	32
Bowling average	6.70
5 wickets in innings	2
10 wickets in match	1
Best bowling	5/26
Catches/stumpings	3/–
- Source: Cricinfo, 15 August 2019

John Bartholomew Parker (born c. 1823 – 2 October 1892) was a Scottish first-class cricketer.

Educated at Harrow School, he made his debut in first-class cricket for the Gentlemen of the North against the Gentlemen of the South at Lord's in 1852, with Parker making two further first-class appearances in 1852 for the Gentlemen of England against the Gentlemen of Kent at Lord's and Canterbury respectively. He played one first-class match in 1853 for the Gentlemen of Marylebone Cricket Club against the Gentlemen of England, before making his final first-class appearance four years later for the Gentlemen of England against the Gentlemen of Kent and Sussex at Canterbury. Playing as a bowler, Parker took 32 wickets in his five first-class matches, at an average of 6.70, with best figures of 5 for 26 against the Gentlemen of Kent and Sussex. He took five wickets in an innings twice and ten wickets in a match once. He died at Edinburgh in October 1892.
