= Ballyglass =

Village in County Mayo, Ireland

Coordinates: 53.7459°N 9.1757°W

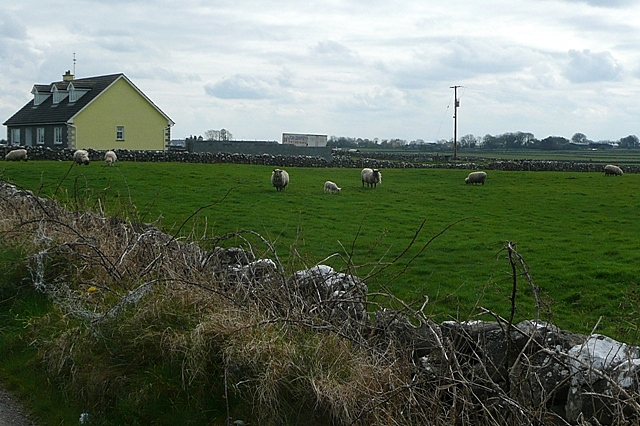
Rural house and sheep pasture in Ballyglass (photo by Graham Horn, 2009)

Ballyglass (Irish: An Baile Glas, meaning 'Green Village') is a small village in central County Mayo in Ireland. It is situated about 10 miles from Castlebar, and closer to Claremorris and Ballinrobe.

== Infrastructure ==
Ballyglass consists of one shop, two pubs, a primary school, a playschool, a community center, a tennis court, a soccer pitch with a flood-lit training pitch, a football team, a post office, and a part-time dispensary. The Garda barracks was shut down in 2013, and was sold at auction in 2021. The Old Ground, now a public house, was originally built as a warehouse. A court house was situated where Murphy's guest house is today.

The Garda Barracks was originally built to house a hotel to support a planned train station. However, plans changed and no train station exists in Ballyglass today.

The village and the catchment area in general boasts a number of historical sites including Raths, ringforts, Bronze Age burial places, and Fulachta Fia.

== Area ==
Ballyglass has an area of

- 1,448,663 m² / 144.87 hectares / 1.4487 km²
- 0.56 sq miles
- 357 acres

Nationwide, it is the 18847th largest townland.

Within Co. Clare, it is the 811th largest townland.

== Education ==
Mountpleasant National School was built in 1888 and was the Community Centre, but was vacated in 1986.

A new playschool began construction in December 2008 when the Minister of State for Children, Barry Andrews, visited Ballyglass and "turned the sod" for the new childcare facility. The new building was due to be built at the rear of the Mountpleasant National School.

== Sport ==
=== Association football ===
Ballyglass Football Club was founded in 1975. Ballyglass FC grounds were officially opened in 1989 by the then President of Ireland, Mary Robinson. Throughout the years, the Ballyglass FC has enjoyed numerous upgrades to the amount of amenities offered including: a floodlit training pitch, an astro turf pitch, clubhouse and changing rooms, meeting and function rooms, storage shed and ample car parking. Originally housed in the local turlough, Ballyglass F.C. moved uphill to Michael Keaveney Park; naming their new ground after one of the club's founding members. The ground has two grass pitches, an artificial turf pitch and a clubhouse with dressing rooms. The club has won the Mayo Association Football League title three times; in 1990–91, 1996 and 1997.

== Archaeology ==
Excavations at Ballyglass have uncovered a tomb and a house from the Neolithic period. Pottery with rolled rims, arrowheads and scrapers of flint and chert were discovered at the site. The tomb is a megalithic "court cairn," which is a type common to Western Ireland. During the excavation of the center-court tomb in 1970, a rectangular timber house (neolithic house) was uncovered. The house dates from a somewhat earlier time, although both are thought to be from roughly 3000 BCE, and the house is one of very few Neolithic houses known to archaeologists in the entirety of Ireland and Great Britain.

== Notable people ==
- Denis Bingham (1829–1897), first-class cricketer

== See also ==
- List of towns and villages in Ireland
