= 1983 All-Ireland Senior Hurling Championship =

Championship details
- Dates: 29 May – 4 September 1983
- Teams: 14

All-Ireland champions
- Winning team: Kilkenny (23rd win)
- Captain: Liam Fennelly
- Manager: Pat Henderson

All-Ireland Finalists
- Losing team: Cork
- Captain: Jimmy Barry-Murphy
- Manager: Johnny Clifford

Provincial champions
- Munster: Cork
- Leinster: Kilkenny
- Ulster: Not Played
- Connacht: Not Played

Championship statistics
- No. matches played: 14
- Top Scorer: Billy Fitzpatrick (1–24)
- Player of the Year: Frank Cummins
- All-Star Team: See here

The 1983 All-Ireland Senior Hurling Championship was the 97th staging of the All-Ireland Senior Hurling Championship, the Gaelic Athletic Association's premier inter-county hurling tournament. The championship ran from 29 May to 4 September 1983.

Kilkenny were the defending champions.

The All-Ireland final was played on 4 September 1983 at Croke Park in Dublin, between Kilkenny and Cork, in what was their second consecutive meeting in the All-Ireland final. Kilkenny won the match by 2–14 to 2–12 to claim their 23rd All-Ireland title overall and a second consecutive title.

Kilkenny's Billy Fitzpatrick was the championship's top scorer with 1–24. Kilkenny's Frank Cummins was the choice for Hurler of the Year.

== Team changes ==
=== To Championship ===
Promoted from the All-Ireland Senior B Hurling Championship

- Kerry

== Teams ==
=== General information ===
Fourteen counties will compete in the All-Ireland Senior Hurling Championship: one team from the Connacht Senior Hurling Championship, six teams in the Leinster Senior Hurling Championship, five teams in the Munster Senior Hurling Championship, one team from the Ulster Senior Hurling Championship and one team from the All-Ireland Senior B Hurling Championship.

County	Last provincial title	Last championship title	Position in 1982 Championship	Current championship
Antrim	1946	—		Ulster Senior Hurling Championship
Clare	1932	1914		Munster Senior Hurling Championship
Cork	1982	1978		Munster Senior Hurling Championship
Dublin	1961	1938		Leinster Senior Hurling Championship
Galway	1922	1980		Leinster Senior Hurling Championship
Kerry	1891	1891		All-Ireland Senior B Hurling Championship
Kilkenny	1982	1982		Leinster Senior Hurling Championship
Laois	1949	1915		Leinster Senior Hurling Championship
Limerick	1981	1973		Munster Senior Hurling Championship
Offaly	1981	1981		Leinster Senior Hurling Championship
Tipperary	1971	1971		Munster Senior Hurling Championship
Waterford	1963	1959		Munster Senior Hurling Championship
Westmeath	—	—		Leinster Senior Hurling Championship
Wexford	1977	1968		Leinster Senior Hurling Championship

== Format ==
The provincial championships in Munster and Leinster were all played on a knock-out basis as usual. In keeping with the rotation system for advancement to the All-Ireland final, the Leinster champions automatically qualified for the final of 1983. Galway, having no competition in the Connacht Championship, played the winners of a preliminary game between Kerry and Antrim. The winners of this quarter-final went on to play the Munster champions in a single All-Ireland semi-final.

== Provincial championships ==
=== Leinster Senior Hurling championship ===
29 May
Quarter-Final

Wexford	7–18 – 1–13	Westmeath
J. Quigley (2–3), T. Doran (2–1), J. Murphy (1–4), J. Walker (1–3), P. Courtney (0–4), G. O'Connell (1–0), J. Holohan (0–2), M. Jacob (0–1).		M. Ryan (0–5), M. Kilcoyne (1–0), M. Cosgrave (0–2), G. Jackson (0–2), J. J. Lynch (0–1), J. Fitzsimons (0–1), J. Kilcoyne (0–1), P. Curran (0–1).

Nowlan Park, Kilkenny
Attendance: 7,000
Referee: J. Rankisn (Laois)

29 May
Quarter-Final

Dublin	4–10 – 2–11	Laois
J. Towell (3–3), M. Morris (1–3), P. Carton (0–2), P. Mulhare (0–1), G. Hogarty (0–1).		M. Walsh (0–4), P. J. Cudd (1–0), M. Cuddy (1–0), M. Brophy (0–3), J. Bohane (0–2), E. Fennelly (0–1), P. Critchley (0–1).

Nowlan Park, Kilkenny
Attendance: 7,000
Referee: P. Long (Kilkenny)

19 June
Semi-Final

Offaly	1–20 – 0–11	Dublin
J. Flaherty (1–3), M. Corrigan (0–5), P. Carroll (0–5), G. Coughlan (0–3), P. Delaney (0–2), P. Horan (0–1), T. Conneely (0–1).		P. Carton (0–4), J. Towell (0–3), S. Kearns (0–2), G. Hogarty (0–1), L. Walsh (0–1).

Croke Park, Dublin
Attendance: 28,521
Referee: J. Rankins (Laois)

19 June
Semi-Final

Kilkenny	5–13 – 3–15	Wexford
B. Fitzpatrick (1–9), L. Fennelly (2–1), K. Brennan (1–2), C. Heffernan (1–0), H. Ryan (0–1).		S. Kinsella (2–3), J. Quigley (1–5), P. Courtney (0–2), M. Jacob (0–1), T. Doran (0–1), G. Flood (0–1), G. O'Connor (0–1), J. Murphy (0–1).

Croke Park, Dublin
Attendance: 28,521
Referee: J. Rankins (Laois)

10 July
Final

Kilkenny	1–17 – 0–13	Offaly
C. Heffernan (1–2), B. Fitzpatrick (0–5), R. Power (0–3), H. Ryan (0–3), L. Fennelly (0–1), K. Brennan (0–1), G. Henderson (0–1), G. Fennelly (0–1).		P. Horan (0–5), M. Corrigan (0–3), J. Falherty (0–1), P. Corrigan (0–1), P. Delaney (0–1), J. Kelly (0–1), P. Carroll (0–1).

Croke Park, Dublin
Attendance: 35,707
Referee: N. O'Donoghue (Dublin)

=== Munster Senior Hurling championship ===
29 May
Quarter-Final

Tipperary	2–11 – 1–11	Clare
J. Grogan (1–6), T. Waters (1–0), P. Dooley (0–2), N. English (0–1), L. Bergin (0–1), L. Maher (0–1).		E. O'Connor (1–0), G. McInerney (0–3), C. Honan (0–3), P. Morey (0–1), S. Hehir (0–1), T. Nugent (0–1), J. Callinan (0–1), J. Shanahan (0–1).

Gaelic Grounds, Limerick
Referee: F. Murphy (Cork)

12 June
Semi-Final

Limerick	2–14 – 3–11	Cork
J. McKenna (1–3), P. Foley (0–4), J. Flanagan (1–0), M. Rea (0–2), O. O'Connor (0–2), D. FitzGerald (0–2), F. Nolan (0–1).		K. Hennessy (2–0), J. Barry-Murphy (0–5), E. O'Donoghue (1–0), B. Óg Murphy (0–3), J. Meyler (0–1), J. Buckley (0–1), T. Cashman (0–1).

Gaelic Grounds, Limerick
Attendance: 24,769
Referee: S. O'Meara (Tipperary)

19 June
Semi-Final

Waterford	4–13 – 2–15	Tipperary
T. Casey (1–3), J. Greene (1–2), E. Rockett (1–1), S. Breen (1–0), P. McGrath (0–2), P. Ryan (0–2), M. Walsh (0–2), J. Hennebry (0–1).		J. Grogan (0–7), T. Water (1–1), R. Callaghan (1–0), P. Fitzelle (0–2), L. Maher (0–2), P. Dooley (0–1), N. English (0–1), M. Doyle (0–1).

Páirc Uí Chaoimh, Cork
Referee: F. Murphy (Cork)

26 June
Semi-Final Replay

Cork	1–14 – 1–12	Limerick
B. Óg Murphy (0–6), J. Barry-Murphy (1–0), E. O'Donoghue (0–2), K. Hennessy (0–2), J. Fenton (0–1), P. Horgan (0–1), T. Cashman (0–1), J. Meyler (0–1).		J. McKenna (1–1), D. FitzGerald (0–3), E. Cregan (0–2), O. O'Connor (0–2), P. Foley (0–1), M. Rea (0–1), J. Flanagan (0–1), S. Foley (0–1).

Páirc Uí Chaoimh, Cork
Attendance: 38,000
Referee: G. Ryan (Tipperary)

10 July
Final

Cork	3–22 – 0–12	Waterford
J. Barry-Murphy (1–5), E. O'Donoghue (2–0), K. Hennessy (0–5), J. Buckley (0–3), T. Cashman (0–2), T. O'Sullivan (0–2), B. Óg Murphy (0–2), T. Mulcahy (0–1).		P. McGrath (0–5), J. Hennebry (0–2), T. Casey (0–2), Michael Walsh (0–1), S. Breen (0–1), Mossie Walsh (0–1).

Gaelic Grounds, Limerick
Attendance: 20,816
Referee: N. Duggan (Limerick)

== All-Ireland Senior Hurling Championship ==
=== Bracket ===
Teams in bold advanced to the next round. The provincial champions are marked by an asterisk.

**Preliminary round** 10 July		**Quarter-finals**; 24 July		**Semi-finals**; 7 August		**All-Ireland final** 4 September
				**Cork**	**5–14**
				Galway	1–16
		**Galway**	**3–22**
**Antrim**	**3–13**	Antrim	2–05
Kerry	2–10					Cork	2–12
						**Kilkenny**	**2–14**

=== All-Ireland preliminary round ===
10 July
Preliminary Round

Antrim	3–13 – 2–10	Kerry
D. Donnelly (1–3), M. O'Connell (0–6), A. McCarry (1–1), B. Donnelly (1–0), D. McNaughton (0–2), T. McNaughton (0–1).		J. Hennessy (1–5), F. O'Donovan (1–2), C. Walsh (0–2), T. Canty (0–1).

O'Toole Park, Dublin
Referee: C. Foley (Dublin)

=== All-Ireland quarter-finals ===
24 July
Quarter-Final

Galway	3–22 – 2–5	Antrim
P. J. Molloy (0–10), I. Clarke (0–5), A. Staunton (0–5), Joe Connolly (1–1), M. Connolly (1–0), B. Forde (1–0), S. Mahon (0–1).		D. Donnelly (1–0), B. Laverty (1–0), D. McNaughton (0–3), G. Cunningham (0–1).

Cusack Park, Mullingar
Attendance: 3,000
Referee: J. Rankins (Laois)

=== All-Ireland semi-finals ===
7 August
Semi-Final

Cork	5–14 – 1–16	Galway
B. Óg Murphy (1–7), T. Mulcahy (2–0), J. Barry-Murphy (1–2), E. O'Donoghue (1–1), K. Hennessy (0–1), J. Buckley (0–1), T. Cashman (0–1), J. Fenton (0–1).		P. J. Molloy (0–7), N. Lane (1–1), M. Connolly (0–2), A. Staunton (0–2), B. Forde (0–1), F. Burke (0–1), C. Hayes (0–1), S. Linnane (0–1).

Croke Park, Dublin
Attendance: 22,789
Referee: N. O'Donoghue (Dublin)

=== All-Ireland Final ===
4 September
Final

Kilkenny	2–14 – 2–12	Cork
B. Fitzpatrick (0–10), R. Power (1–0), L. Fennelly (1–0), G. Henderson (0–2), C. Heffernan (0–1), H. Ryan (0–1).		B. Óg Murphy (0–5), S. O'Leary (1–0), T. Mulcahy (1–0), J. Buckley (0–3), K. Hennessy (0–2), E. O'Donoghue (0–1), F. Collins (0–1).

Croke Park, Dublin
Attendance: 58,381
Referee: N. Duggan (Limerick)

**Kilkenny**	**Cork**

== Championship statistics ==
=== Top scorers ===
Overall

Rank	Player	County	Tally	Total	Matches	Average
1	Billy Fitzpatrick	Kilkenny	1–24	27	3	9.00
2	Bertie Óg Murphy	Cork	1–23	26	5	5.20
3	Jimmy Barry-Murphy	Cork	3–12	21	5	4.20
4	John Quigley	Wexford	3–08	17	2	8.50
4	P. J. Molloy	Galway	0–17	17	2	8.50
6	Éamonn O'Donoghue	Cork	4–04	16	5	3.20
6	Kevin Hennessy	Cork	2–10	16	5	3.20
6	John Grogan	Tipperary	1–13	16	2	8.00
9	Joe Towell	Dublin	3–06	15	2	7.50
10	Liam Fennelly	Kilkenny	3–02	11	3	3.66

In a single game

Rank	Player	County	Tally	Total	Opposition
1	Joe Towell	Dublin	3–03	12	Laois
1	Billy Fitzpatrick	Kilkenny	1–09	12	Wexford
3	Bertie Óg Murphy	Cork	1–07	10	Galway
3	P. J. Molloy	Galway	0–10	10	Antrim
3	Billy Fitzpatrick	Kilkenny	0–10	10	Cork
6	John Quigley	Wexford	2–03	9	Westmeath
6	Seán Kinsella	Wexford	2–03	9	Kilkenny
6	John Grogan	Tipperary	1–06	9	Clare
9	John Quigley	Wexford	1–05	8	Kilkenny
9	Jimmy Barry-Murphy	Cork	1–05	8	Waterford
9	Joe Hennessy	Kerry	1–05	8	Antrim

=== Miscellaneous ===
- Tipperary's victory over Clare in the Munster quarter-final was the team's first in the provincial championship since 1973.
- The attendance of 20,816 at the Munster final was the lowest at the provincial decider since 1972.
- In the All-Ireland final two Kilkenny players achieved rare distinctions. Goalkeeper Noel Skehan won a record-breaking ninth All-Ireland medal, however, his first three were won as non-playing substitutes. Midfielder Frank Cummins won his seventh All-Ireland medal on the field of play, equalling the record of four other Kilkenny players from the early part of the century. It was his eighth winners' medal overall as he won a non-playing substitutes' medal in 1967. Cummins also joined a unique group of players who won All-Ireland medals in three different decades.

== Roll of Honour ==
- Cork – 24 (1978)
- Kilkenny – 23 (1983)
- Tipperary – 22 (1971)
- Limerick – 7 (1973)
- Dublin – 6 (1938)
- Wexford – 5 (1968)
- Waterford – 2 (1959)
- Galway – 2 (1980)
- Offaly – 1 (1981)
- Laois – 1 (1915)
- Clare – 1 (1914)
- London – 1 (1901)
- Kerry – 1 (1891)

== Broadcasting ==
The following matches were broadcast live on television in Ireland on RTÉ.

Round	RTÉ
All-Ireland semi-final	Cork vs Galway
All-Ireland final	Kilkenny vs Cork
