= Kevin Hennessy =

Irish hurler

Personal information
- Native name: Caoimhghín Ó hAonghusa (Irish)
- Born: 8 March 1961 (age 65) Midleton, County Cork, Ireland
- Occupation: Civil Servant
- Height: 6 ft 2 in (188 cm)

Sport
- Sport: Hurling
- Position: Left corner-forward
Club
- Years: Club
- Midleton
Club titles
- Cork titles: 4
- Munster titles: 2
- All-Ireland Titles: 1
Inter-county*
Years	County	Apps (scores)
1982–1993	Cork	22 (23–49)
Inter-county titles
- Munster titles: 7
- All-Irelands: 3
- NHL: 0
- All Stars: 1
- *Inter County team apps and scores correct as of 15:37, 17 November 2013.

Kevin Hennessy (born 8 March 1961) is an Irish retired hurler who played as a left-corner forward for the Cork senior team.

Born in Midleton, County Cork, Hennessy first arrived on the inter-county scene at the age of 18 when he first linked up with the Cork minor team, before later lining out with the under-21 side. He made his senior debut in the 1982 championship. Hennessy went on to play a key part for over a decade, and won three All-Ireland medals and seven Munster medals. He was an All-Ireland runner-up on three occasions.

Hennessy represented the Munster inter-provincial team in the early stages of his career, winning two Railway Cup medals. At club level he won one All-Ireland medal, two Munster medals and four championship medals with Midleton.

Throughout his career Hennessy made 22 championship appearances for Cork. He retired from inter-county hurling following the conclusion of the 1993 championship.

== Playing career ==
=== Club ===
Hennessy played his club hurling with the Midleton club in East Cork and came to prominence just as the club joined the senior ranks of the county championship. He won his first senior county senior championship title with the club in 1983. It was Midleton's first senior county final triumph since 1916. Hennessy's side later had the honour of representing Cork in the provincial club championship. A 1–14 to 1–11 defeat of Tipperary's Borrisoleigh in the replay of provincial decider gave Fenton a Munster club winners' medal. Midleton were later defeated by Gort in the All-Ireland club semi-final.

Three years later in 1986 Hennessy captured a second county title before adding a third county winners' medal to his collection in 1987. Later that year Midleton won a second Munster club title following a one-point win over Cappawhite of Tipperary. On St. Patrick's Day, 1988 Midleton lined out in the All-Ireland club final. Athenry of Galway provided the opposition, however, two early goals by Hennessy and a kicked goal by Colm O'Neill gave Midleton a 3–8 to 0–9 victory. This victory also gave Hennessy an All-Ireland club winners' medal.

Hennessy won a fourth and final county title with the club in 1991.

He was also a Cork Senior Football Championship winner with Imokilly in 1984. He also won a Cork Intermediate Football Championship in 1984 with Midleton.

=== Minor and under-21 ===
Hennessy first came to prominence on the inter-county scene with Cork in the early 1970s. In 1979 he enjoyed his first success in the minor grade. Hennessy began the year by winning a Munster minor hurling title following a 3–17 to 404 defeat of Limerick. The subsequent All-Ireland final saw Cork take on Kilkenny. A close game ensued, however, at the final whistle Cork were the champions by 2–11 to 1–9, giving Hennessy an All-Ireland minor hurling winners' medal.

Hennessy later joined the Cork under-21 hurling team and enjoyed the ultimate success in 1982. That year he captured a Munster winners' title in that grade as Limerick were easily accounted for. The subsequent All-Ireland final pitted Cork against Galway. A marrow 0–12 to 0–11 victory gave Hennessy an All-Ireland under-21 winners' medal.

=== Senior ===
Hennessy later joined the Cork senior hurling team and won his first senior Munster winners' medal in 1982 following a 5–31 to 3–6 trouncing of Waterford. The subsequent All-Ireland final saw Cork take on Kilkenny. Following an impressive provincial championship campaign 'the Rebels' were the red-hot favourites, however, Kilkenny surprised. Christy Heffernan scored two goals in a 40-second spell just before the interval to take the wind out of Cork's sails. Ger Fennelly got a third goal within eight minutes of the restart, giving Kilkenny a 3–18 to 1–15 victory.

In 1983 Cork's run of provincial success continued. Hennessy won a second Munster title that year as Cork trounced Waterford for the second consecutive year. The subsequent All-Ireland final pitted Cork against Kilkenny for the second consecutive year also. 'The Cats' used a strong wind to dominate the opening half and built up a strong lead. Cork came storming back with goals by Tomás Mulcahy and Seánie O'Leary, however, at the full-time whistle Kilkenny had won by 2–14 to 2–12.

1984 was a special year in the annals of Gaelic games as it was the centenary year of the Gaelic Athletic Association. The year began well with Hennessy helping his team to victory in the special Centenary Cup competition. A third Munster winners' medal soon followed for Hennessy as Cork defeated Tipperary by 4–15 to 3–14 in a memorable Munster final. The subsequent All-Ireland final, played at Semple Stadium in Thurles, saw Cork take on Offaly for the first time ever in championship history. The centenary-year final failed to live up to expectations and Cork recorded a relatively easy 3–16 to 1–12 victory. It was Hennessy's first All-Ireland winners' medal.

In 1985 Hennessy added a fourth Munster title to his collection as Cork defeated Tipperary by 4–17 to 4–11 in the provincial decider. Cork, however, were later defeated by Galway in the All-Ireland semi-final.

In 1986 Cork made it five-in-a-row in Munster as Cork defeated Clare by 2–18 to 3–12 to take the provincial title. This victory paved the way for an All-Ireland final meeting with Galway. The men from the west were the red-hot favourites against an ageing Cork team, however, on the day a different story unfolded. Four Cork goals, one from John Fenton, two from Tomás Mulcahy and one from Hennessy, stymied the Galway attack and helped 'the Rebels' to a 4–13 to 2–15 victory. It was Hennessy's second All-Ireland winners' medal.

In 1987 Hennessy was captain as Cork were attempting to make history by winning a record sixth Munster title in-a-row. Tipperary provided the opposition on that occasion, however, the game ended in a draw. The replay in FitzGerald Stadium, Killarney has gone down in history as one of the great provincial finals. At full-time both sides were level again and extra-time was played. Tipp eventually won the day by 4–22 to 1–22 and it was the first time in five years that Cork were not provincial champions.

Cork went into decline following this game as Tipperary dominated the Munster championship for the next three seasons. More importantly, Hennessy was dropped from the Cokr championship team in 1989. The team returned in 1990 with Hennessy winning a sixth Munster title following an odds defying 4–16 to 2–14 defeat of Tipperary. Cork subsequently qualified for another All-Ireland final showdown with Galway. Once again, Galway were the favourites and were out to capture a third All-Ireland title in four seasons. Shortly after half-time the westerners were up by seven points and were cruising to victory. Tomás Mulcahy, however, played a captain's role and scored a crucial goal that revitalised the Cork attack. The final score of 5–15 to 2–21 gave Cork the victory in one of the most open hurling finals in years and gave Hennessy a third All-Ireland winners' medal.

Tipp wrested the Munster title from Cork again in 1991, however, Hennessy won his seventh Munster winners' medal on the field of play in 1992 as Limerick fell to 'the Rebels.' After a defeat of Down, Cork advanced to the All-Ireland final where Kilkenny provided the opposition. It was the two sides' first meeting in the championship in nine years. All-Ireland victories over Galway and Offaly had given Hennessy three All-Ireland medals, however, a defeat of Cork's biggest rivals would put the icing on the cake. Kilkenny played into a strong wind in the first half and were two points in arrears at half-time. 'The Cats' fought back and defeated their arch rivals by 3–10 to 1–12

For the next few years Cork hurling went into decline. Hennessy did play in the first two games of Cork's three-game National Hurling League final saga with Wexford in 1993, however, he was dropped for the final. He retired following Cork's defeat in the championship that year.

=== Inter-provincial ===
Hennessy also lined out with Munster in the inter-provincial hurling competition and enjoyed much success. He first lined out with his province in 1984 as Munster defeated arch-rivals Leinster by 1–18 to 2–9, giving Hennessy a Railway Cup winners' medal. He was a key member of the team again in 1985 as Connacht provided the opposition. A 3–6 to 1–11 score line gave Munster the victory and gave Hennessy a second Railway Cup title. He was a member of the Munster team for a third successive year in 1986, however, Connacht gained their revenge for the previous year's defeat. This was Hennessy's last outing with his province.

== Career statistics ==
Team	Year	National League			Munster		All-Ireland		Total	
Team	Year	Division	Apps	Score	Apps	Score	Apps	Score	Apps	Score
Cork	1981-82	Division 1A	x	0-00	3	2-01	1	0-00	x	2-01
Cork	1982-83	Division 1	x	1-08	3	1-07	2	0-03	x	2-18
Cork	1983-84	Division 1	x	0-06	2	0-02	2	2-01	x	2-09
Cork	1984-85	Division 1	5	4-15	2	0-03	1	2-01	8	6-19
Cork	1985-86	Division 1	x	0-05	2	2-03	2	3-02	x	5-10
Cork	1986-87	Division 1	x	4-05	4	1-03	—		x	5-08
Cork	1987-88	Division 1	x	2-03	2	0-00	—		x	2-03
Cork	1988-89	Division 2	x	x-xx	0	0-00	—		x	x-xx
Cork	1989-90	Division 1	7	9-13	3	3-06	2	1-05	12	13-24
Cork	1990-91	Division 1	x	2-11	3	3-02	—		x	5-13
Cork	1991-92	Division 1B	x	1-04	3	0-05	2	1-03	x	2-12
Cork	1992-93	Division 1B	x	3-05	1	0-00	—		x	3-05
Career total			x	x-xx	28	12-32	12	9-15	x	x-xx

Sporting positions
Preceded by Tom Cashman	Cork Senior Hurling Captain; 1987	Succeeded by Denis Mulcahy
