= List of All Stars Awards winners (hurling) =

This is a list of all the past winners of the official GAA GPA All Stars Awards in hurling since the first awards in 1971. As an insight to the prominent players of the 1960s, it also includes the unofficial "Cuchulainn" awards presented from 1963 to 1967 under the auspices of Gaelic Weekly magazine.

Since 1971, the All Stars Awards in hurling have been presented annually to a set of fifteen hurlers from that year's All-Ireland Senior Hurling Championship, who are seen to be deserving of being named in a "Team of the Year". The shortlist is compiled by a selection committee steering group, while the overall winners are chosen by inter-county players themselves. The All Star is regarded by players as the highest individual award available to them, due to it being picked by their peers.

Limerick hold the record for most All-Star winners in one year with 12 players chosen in the hurling selection for 2021.

== Key ==
Positions (Note: For more information, see Formation (association football).)
GK	Goalkeeper
RCB	Right corner-back
FB	Full-back
LCB	Left corner-back
RWB	Right wing-back
CB	Centre-back
LWB	Left wing-back
MD	Midfield
MD	Midfield
RWF	Right wing-forward
CF	Centre-forward
LWF	Left wing-forward
RCF	Right corner-forward
FF	Full-forward
LCF	Left corner-forward

Key
Symbol	Meaning
	Had previously appeared on an All-Stars team
Pos.	Position

== Cú Chulainn Awards ==
=== 1963 ===
Pos.	Player	Winner	Team
GK	Ollie Walsh	1	Kilkenny
RCB	Tom Neville	1	Wexford
FB	Austin Flynn	1	Waterford
LCB	John Doyle	1	Tipperary
RWB	Séamus Cleere	1	Kilkenny
CB	Billy Rackard	1	Wexford
LWB	Larry Guinan	1	Waterford
MD	Theo English	1	Tipperary
MD	Des Foley	1	Dublin
RWF	Jimmy Doyle	1	Tipperary
CF	Mick Flannelly	1	Waterford
LWF	Eddie Keher	1	Kilkenny
RCF	Liam Devaney	1	Tipperary
FF	Jimmy Smyth	1	Clare
LCF	Phil Grimes	1	Waterford

=== 1964 ===
Pos.	Player	Winner	Team
GK	Ollie Walsh	2	Kilkenny
RCB	John Doyle	2	Tipperary
FB	Pa Dillon	1	Kilkenny
LCB	Tom Neville	2	Wexford
RWB	Séamus Cleere	2	Kilkenny
CB	Tony Wall	1	Tipperary
LWB	Pat Henderson	1	Kilkenny
MD	Mick Roche	1	Tipperary
MD	Paddy Moran	1	Kilkenny
RWF	Jimmy Doyle	2	Tipperary
CF	Michael 'Babs' Keating	1	Tipperary
LWF	Eddie Keher	2	Kilkenny
RCF	Tom Walsh	1	Kilkenny
FF	John McKenna	1	Tipperary
LCF	Donie Nealon	1	Tipperary

=== 1965 ===
Pos.	Player	Winner	Team
GK	John O'Donoghue	1	Tipperary
RCB	Tom Neville	3	Wexford
FB	Austin Flynn	2	Waterford
LCB	Kieran Carey	1	Tipperary
RWB	Denis O'Riordan	1	Cork
CB	Tony Wall	2	Tipperary
LWB	Jimmy Duggan	1	Galway
MD	Phil Wilson	1	Wexford
MD	Mick Roche	2	Tipperary
RWF	Jimmy Doyle	3	Tipperary
CF	Pat Carroll	1	Kilkenny
LWF	Pat Cronin	1	Clare
RCF	Donie Nealon	2	Tipperary
FF	John McKenna	2	Tipperary
LCF	Seán McLoughlin	1	Tipperary

=== 1966 ===
Pos.	Player	Winner	Team
GK	Paddy Barry	1	Cork
RCB	Pat Henderson	2	Kilkenny
FB	Austin Flynn	3	Waterford
LCB	Denis Murphy	1	Cork
RWB	Séamus Cleere	3	Kilkenny
CB	Kevin Long	1	Limerick
LWB	Martin Coogan	1	Kilkenny
MD	Bernie Hartigan	1	Limerick
MD	Theo English	2	Tipperary
RWF	Seánie Barry	1	Cork
CF	Eddie Keher	3	Kilkenny
LWF	Pat Cronin	2	Clare
RCF	Paddy Molloy	1	Offaly
FF	John McKenna	3	Tipperary
LCF	Mattie Fox	1	Galway

=== 1967 ===
Pos.	Player	Winner	Team
GK	Ollie Walsh	3	Kilkenny
RCB	Pat Henderson	3	Kilkenny
FB	Pa Dillon	2	Kilkenny
LCB	Jim Treacy	1	Kilkenny
RWB	Séamus Cleere	4	Kilkenny
CB	Jim Cullinan	1	Clare
LWB	Len Gaynor	1	Tipperary
MD	Mick Roche	3	Tipperary
MD	Paddy Moran	2	Kilkenny
RWF	Eddie Keher	4	Kilkenny
CF	Tony Wall	3	Tipperary
LWF	Pat Cronin	3	Clare
RCF	Donie Nealon	3	Tipperary
FF	Tony Doran	1	Wexford
LCF	Michael 'Babs' Keating	2	Tipperary

== All Star awards listed by year 1970s ==
=== 1971 ===
Pos.	Player	Team	Appearances	Rationale
GK	Damien Martin	Offaly	1	"For maintaining his very high level of brilliance in a position that invariably produced more than a few top class performances in any one year."
RCB	Tony Maher	Cork	1	"For his dependability. His unobtrusive but completely effective work in defence has always been the great quality of his hurling, particularly so this year."
FB	Pat Hartigan	Limerick	1	"For his contribution as one of the mainstays of Limerick's resurgence in 1971. At full back he showed unyielding stubbornness under the heaviest of pressure."
LCB	Jim Treacy	Kilkenny	1	"For maintaining his position as the outstanding left corner back in the country, for his sportsmanship and calm play in every situation."
RWB	Tadhg O'Connor	Tipperary	1	"For captaining Tipperary in their recapture of the All-Ireland championship. His qualities of leadership and great-hearted spirit were repeatedly in evidence throughout the season."
CB	Mick Roche	Tipperary	1	"For his memorable performances as one of the hurling perfectionists of his era, his true brilliance comes to the surface when the competition is at its hottest."
LWB	Martin Coogan	Kilkenny	1	"For bringing his judgement and experience out of retirement in 1971. His steadying influence was a major reason for the return of the Leinster title to Kilkenny."
MD	John Connolly	Galway	1	"For the admirable hurling style exemplified in his play. His crisp, deft striking of the ball was one but one of his many splendid skills."
MD	Frank Cummins	Kilkenny	1	"For his considerable role in recapturing the Leinster title for Kilkenny and Cork championship for Blackrock. All the promise of his early hurling years blossomed in 1971."
RWF	Francis Loughnane	Tipperary	1	"For his quick incisive forward play. His scoring ability was one of the factors enabling his County to become All-Ireland champions in 1971."
CF	Michael 'Babs' Keating	Tipperary	1	"For his exemplary performance in recovering his County team place and then becoming the inspiration of his team's many fine achievements during the year."
LWF	Eddie Keher	Kilkenny	1	"For his consummate artistry, the poise and grace he brings to his chosen sport. For a decade his play has delighted thousands of lovers of the game."
RCF	Mick Bermingham	Dublin	1	"For his stalwart contribution to the Dublin attack during the season. His skill, earnestness and unflagging enthusiasm made him the country's leading scorer in 1971."
FF	Ray Cummins	Cork	1	"For introducing a new degree of subtlety into full-forward play. His perfect coordination and the wide variety of his attacking play continually setting up scores."
LCF	Éamonn Cregan	Limerick	1	"For his speed, elusiveness and powerful shot which unite to make him one of the most successful score-getters of modern times. His effectiveness was strikingly emphasised during 1971."

=== 1972 ===
Pos.	Player	Team	Appearances	Rationale
GK	Noel Skehan	Kilkenny	1	"For loyalty and devotion to his native county: for truly magnificent goalkeeping as he led Kilkenny to their 18th Championship."
RCB	Tony Maher	Cork	2	"For the courage he showed in overcoming injury and returning to demonstrate that his outstanding defensive qualities had not been diminished."
FB	Pat Hartigan	Limerick	2	"For consummate skill as a ball player: for consistency as a dependable defender even when fortune turned against his county."
LCB	Jim Treacy	Kilkenny	2	"For stubbornness and dependability under the sternest pressure and for proving yet again that he is the outstanding left corner back in the country."
RWB	Pat Lawlor	Kilkenny	1	"For his alertness and mobility in defence. His defensive ability contributing so much to his county's success in 1972."
CB	Mick Jacob	Wexford	1	"For his sparkling hurling style, his intelligent understanding of the game and his refusal to give up in the most difficult of situations."
LWB	Con Roche	Cork	1	"For the intensity of purpose and absolute determination which makes him an unshakeable defender: for his classic striking of the ball."
MD	Frank Cummins	Kilkenny	2	"For the self-assurance and poise which makes him a midfielder of highest stature: for another year of power in the middle for Kilkenny."
MD	Denis Coughlan	Cork	1	"For his hard work and devotion to the game and his county and for his dexterity and elegance in his play."
RWF	Francis Loughnane	Tipperary	2	"For his spirit and accuracy in attack and for the incisive forward play that always makes him a danger near the goal."
CF	Pat Delaney	Kilkenny	1	"For his straight-forward hard play which always commands the highest respect from the opposing defence."
LWF	Eddie Keher	Kilkenny	2	"For continuing to be the peerless marksman in the game from play and from frees: for his shrewd and brilliant use of the ball."
RCF	Charlie McCarthy	Cork	1	"For his great speed and sheer accuracy which gives him opportunities to score from the most unlikely situation."
FF	Ray Cummins	Cork	2	"For the supremely high standard he continues to set for full-forward play: for his utter unselfishness in bringing his team-mates into the game."
LCF	Éamonn Cregan	Limerick	2	"For his solo-running in attack which can split a defence: for his adaptability in other positions out the field."

=== 1973 ===
Pos.	Player	Team	Appearances	Rationale
GK	Noel Skehan	Kilkenny	2	"For his courageous defiance, his agility and trustworthiness making him the kind of goalkeeper that any player would be happy to have behind him."
RCB	Phil "Fan" Larkin	Kilkenny	1	"For his dependability in defence, which combines with his natural hurling skill to establish him as one of the great corner backs of today."
FB	Pat Hartigan	Limerick	3	"For his undiminished skill and dependability in a very demanding position where quite often brawn is substituted for hurling artistry."
LCB	Jim O'Brien	Limerick	1	"For his rare bravery and mobility: for the all-round splender of his contribution to Limerick's much-delayed return to championship honours."
RWB	Colm Doran	Wexford	1	"For his alertness and sense of judgement, for the crispness of his stroke which played such a sizeable part in regaining the National League title for his county."
CB	Pat Henderson	Kilkenny	1	"For his sheer skill and obstinacy in defence, his tenacious approach and the devotion he continues to give to the game."
LWB	Seán Foley	Limerick	1	"For the fervour he brings to all facets of hurling, and particularly for his dedicated half-back play which contributed so much to Limerick's 1973 successes."
MD	Liam O'Brien	Kilkenny	1	"For his artistic stick-work which he has demonstrated with increasing regularity, and for establishing himself as one of the most elegant and energetic midfielders of recent times."
MD	Richie Bennis	Limerick	1	"For the level-headedness he has so frequently shown in the tightest of situations and for his exceptionally high rate of scoring."
RWF	Francis Loughnane	Tipperary	3	"For his incisive intelligent running which so often splits opposing defences: for the remarkable consistency and accuracy of his marksmanship."
CF	Pat Delaney	Kilkenny	2	"For highlighting just how vigorous play can be totally fair, particularly during his famous attacks towards the opposing goal."
LWF	Éamonn Grimes	Limerick	1	"For his seemingly limitless energy and his desire to work all over the field: qualities which have made him a natural leader and a high scorer."
RCF	Martin Quigley	Wexford	1	"For the wide range of his playing skills, his constancy of purpose and his obvious versatility."
FF	Kieran Purcell	Kilkenny	1	"For the out-and-out hard work he puts into the game. For his power of striking and his adaptability in attack."
LCF	Eddie Keher	Kilkenny	3	"For his enormously successful scoring record, his fluency of stroke and his accurate passing which create so many chances for his team mates."

=== 1974 ===
Pos.	Player	Team	Appearances
GK	Noel Skehan	Kilkenny	3
RCB	Phil 'Fan' Larkin	Kilkenny	2
FB	Pat Hartigan	Limerick	4
LCB	John Horgan	Cork	1
RWB	Ger Loughnane	Clare	1
CB	Pat Henderson	Kilkenny	2
LWB	Con Roche	Cork	2
MD	Liam 'Chunky' O'Brien	Kilkenny	2
MD	John Galvin	Waterford	1
RWF	Joe McKenna	Limerick	1
CF	Martin Quigley	Wexford	2
LWF	Mick Crotty	Kilkenny	1
RCF	John Quigley	Wexford	1
FF	Kieran Purcell	Kilkenny	2
LCF	Eddie Keher	Kilkenny	4

=== 1975 ===
Pos.	Player	Team	Appearances
GK	Noel Skehan	Kilkenny	4
RCB	Niall McInerney	Galway	1
FB	Pat Hartigan	Limerick	5
LCB	Brian Cody	Kilkenny	1
RWB	Tadhg O'Connor	Tipperary	1
CB	Seán Silke	Galway	1
LWB	Iggy Clarke	Galway	1
MD	Liam 'Chunky' O'Brien	Kilkenny	3
MD	Gerald McCarthy	Cork	1
RWF	Martin Quigley	Wexford	3
CF	Joe McKenna	Limerick	2
LWF	Éamonn Grimes	Limerick	2
RCF	Mick Brennan	Kilkenny	1
FF	Kieran Purcell	Kilkenny	3
LCF	Eddie Keher	Kilkenny	5

=== 1976 ===
Pos.	Player	Team	Appearances
GK	Noel Skehan	Kilkenny	5
RCB	Phil 'Fan' Larkin	Kilkenny	3
FB	Willie Murphy	Wexford	1
LCB	John McMahon	Clare	1
RWB	Joe McDonagh	Galway	1
CB	Mick Jacob	Wexford	2
LWB	Denis Coughlan	Cork	2
MD	Frank Burke	Galway	1
MD	Pat Moylan	Cork	1
RWF	Mick Malone	Cork	1
CF	Martin Quigley	Wexford	4
LWF	Jimmy Barry-Murphy	Cork	1
RCF	Mick Brennan	Kilkenny	2
FF	Tony Doran	Wexford	1
LCF	Seánie O'Leary	Cork	1

=== 1977 ===
Pos.	Player	Team	Appearances
GK	Séamus Durack	Clare	1
RCB	John McMahon	Clare	2
FB	Martin O'Doherty	Cork	1
LCB	John Horgan	Cork	2
RWB	Ger Loughnane	Clare	2
CB	Mick Jacob	Wexford	3
LWB	Denis Coughlan	Cork	3
MD	Tom Cashman	Cork	1
MD	Mick Moroney	Clare	1
RWF	Christy Keogh	Wexford	1
CF	Jimmy Barry-Murphy	Cork	2
LWF	P. J. Molloy	Galway	1
RCF	Charlie McCarthy	Cork	2
FF	Ray Cummins	Cork	3
LCF	Seánie O'Leary	Cork	2

=== 1978 ===
Pos.	Player	Team	Appearances
GK	Séamus Durack	Clare	2
RCB	Phil 'Fan' Larkin	Kilkenny	4
FB	Martin O'Doherty	Cork	2
LCB	John Horgan	Cork	3
RWB	Joe Hennessy	Kilkenny	1
CB	Ger Henderson	Kilkenny	1
LWB	Denis Coughlan	Cork	4
MD	Tom Cashman	Cork	2
MD	Iggy Clarke	Galway	2
RWF	Jimmy Barry-Murphy	Cork	3
CF	Noel Casey	Clare	1
LWF	Colm Honan	Clare	1
RCF	Charlie McCarthy	Cork	2
FF	Joe McKenna	Limerick	3
LCF	Tommy Butler	Tipperary	1

=== 1979 ===
Pos.	Player	Team	Appearances
GK	Pat McLoughney	Tipperary	1
RCB	Brian Murphy	Cork	1
FB	Martin O'Doherty	Cork	3
LCB	Tadhg O'Connor	Tipperary	3
RWB	Dermot McCurtain	Cork	1
CB	Ger Henderson	Kilkenny	2
LWB	Iggy Clarke	Galway	3
MD	John Connolly	Galway	2
MD	Joe Hennessy	Kilkenny	2
RWF	John Callinan	Clare	1
CF	Frank Burke	Galway	2
LWF	Liam 'Chunky' O'Brien	Kilkenny	4
RCF	Mick Brennan	Kilkenny	3
FF	Joe McKenna	Limerick	4
LCF	Ned Buggy	Wexford	1

== 1980s ==
=== 1980 ===
Pos.	Player	Team	Appearances
GK	Pat McLoughney	Tipperary	2
RCB	Niall McInerney	Galway	2
FB	Leonard Enright	Limerick	1
LCB	Jimmy Cooney	Galway	1
RWB	Dermot McCurtain	Cork	2
CB	Sean Silke	Galway	2
LWB	Iggy Clarke	Galway	4
MD	Joachim Kelly	Offaly	1
MD	Mossie Walsh	Waterford	1
RWF	Joe Connolly	Galway	1
CF	Pat Horgan	Cork	1
LWF	Pat Carroll	Offaly	1
RCF	Bernie Forde	Galway	1
FF	Joe McKenna	Limerick	5
LCF	Éamonn Cregan	Limerick	3

=== 1981 ===
Pos.	Player	Team	Appearances
GK	Séamus Durack	Clare	3
RCB	Brian Murphy	Cork	2
FB	Leonard Enright	Limerick	2
LCB	Jimmy Cooney	Galway	2
RWB	Liam O'Donoghue	Limerick	1
CB	Seán Stack	Clare	1
LWB	Ger Coughlan	Offaly	1
MD	Steve Mahon	Galway	1
MD	Liam Currams	Offaly	1
RWF	John Callinan	Clare	2
CF	George O'Connor	Wexford	1
LWF	Mark Corrigan	Offaly	1
RCF	Pat Carroll	Offaly	2
FF	Joe McKenna	Limerick	6
LCF	Johnny Flaherty	Offaly	1

=== 1982 ===
Pos.	Player	Team	Appearances
GK	Noel Skehan	Kilkenny	6
RCB	John Galvin	Waterford	2
FB	Brian Cody	Kilkenny	2
LCB	Pat Fleury	Offaly	1
RWB	Aidan Fogarty	Offaly	1
CB	Ger Henderson	Kilkenny	3
LWB	Paddy Prendergast	Kilkenny	1
MD	Tim Crowley	Cork	1
MD	Frank Cummins	Kilkenny	3
RWF	Tony O'Sullivan	Cork	1
CF	Pat Horgan	Cork	2
LWF	Richie Power	Kilkenny	1
RCF	Billy Fitzpatrick	Kilkenny	1
FF	Christy Heffernan	Kilkenny	1
LCF	Jim Greene	Waterford	1

=== 1983 ===
Pos.	Player	Team	Appearances
GK	Noel Skehan	Kilkenny	7
RCB	John Henderson	Kilkenny	1
FB	Leonard Enright	Limerick	3
LCB	Dick O'Hara	Kilkenny	1
RWB	Joe Hennessy	Kilkenny	2
CB	Ger Henderson	Kilkenny	4
LWB	Tom Cashman	Cork	3
MD	John Fenton	Cork	1
MD	Frank Cummins	Kilkenny	4
RWF	Nicky English	Tipperary	1
CF	Ger Fennelly	Kilkenny	1
LWF	Noel Lane	Galway	1
RCF	Billy Fitzpatrick	Kilkenny	2
FF	Jimmy Barry-Murphy	Cork	4
LCF	Liam Fennelly	Kilkenny	1

=== 1984 ===
Pos.	Player	Team	Appearances
GK	Ger Cunningham	Cork	1
RCB	Paudie Fitzmaurice	Limerick	1
FB	Eugene Coughlan	Offaly	1
LCB	Pat Fleury	Offaly	2
RWB	Joe Hennessy	Kilkenny	3
CB	Johnny Crowley	Cork	1
LWB	Dermot McCurtain	Cork	3
MD	John Fenton	Cork	2
MD	Joachim Kelly	Offaly	2
RWF	Nicky English	Tipperary	2
CF	Kieran Brennan	Kilkenny	1
LWF	Paddy Kelly	Limerick	1
RCF	Tomás Mulcahy	Cork	1
FF	Noel Lane	Galway	2
LCF	Seánie O'Leary	Cork	3

=== 1985 ===
Pos.	Player	Team	Appearances
GK	Ger Cunningham	Cork	2
RCB	Séamus Coen	Galway	1
FB	Eugene Coughlan	Offaly	2
LCB	Sylvie Linnane	Galway	1
RWB	Pete Finnerty	Galway	1
CB	Pat Delaney	Offaly	1
LWB	Ger Coughlan	Offaly	2
MD	John Fenton	Cork	3
MD	Pat Critchley	Laois	1
RWF	Nicky English	Tipperary	3
CF	Brendan Lynskey	Galway	1
LWF	Joe Cooney	Galway	1
RCF	Pat Cleary	Offaly	1
FF	Pádraig Horan	Offaly	1
LCF	Liam Fennelly	Kilkenny	2

=== 1986 ===
Pos.	Player	Team	Appearances
GK	Ger Cunningham	Cork	3
RCB	Denis Mulcahy	Cork	1
FB	Conor Hayes	Galway	1
LCB	Sylvie Linnane	Galway	2
RWB	Pete Finnerty	Galway	2
CB	Tony Keady	Galway	1
LWB	Bobby Ryan	Tipperary	1
MD	John Fenton	Cork	4
MD	Richie Power	Kilkenny	2
RWF	Tony O'Sullivan	Cork	2
CF	Tomás Mulcahy	Cork	2
LWF	Joe Cooney	Galway	2
RCF	David Kilcoyne	Westmeath	1
FF	Jimmy Barry-Murphy	Cork	5
LCF	Kevin Hennessy	Cork	1

=== 1987 ===
Pos.	Player	Team	Appearances
GK	Ken Hogan	Tipperary	1
RCB	Joe Hennessy	Kilkenny	4
FB	Conor Hayes	Galway	2
LCB	Ollie Kilkenny	Galway	1
RWB	Pete Finnerty	Galway	3
CB	Ger Henderson	Kilkenny	5
LWB	John Conran	Wexford	1
MD	Steve Mahon	Galway	1
MD	John Fenton	Cork	5
RWF	Michael McGrath	Galway	1
CF	Joe Cooney	Galway	3
LWF	Aidan Ryan	Tipperary	1
RCF	Pat Fox	Tipperary	1
FF	Nicky English	Tipperary	4
LCF	Liam Fennelly	Kilkenny	3

=== 1988 ===
Pos.	Player	Team	Appearances
GK	John Commins	Galway	1
RCB	Sylvie Linnane	Galway	3
FB	Conor Hayes	Galway	3
LCB	Martin Hanamy	Offaly	1
RWB	Pete Finnerty	Galway	4
CB	Tony Keady	Galway	2
LWB	Bobby Ryan	Tipperary	2
MD	Colm Bonnar	Tipperary	1
MD	George O'Connor	Wexford	2
RWF	Declan Ryan	Tipperary	1
CF	Ciaran Barr	Antrim	1
LWF	Martin Naughton	Galway	1
RCF	Michael McGrath	Galway	2
FF	Nicky English	Tipperary	5
LCF	Tony O'Sullivan	Cork	3

=== 1989 ===
Pos.	Player	Team	Appearances
GK	John Commins	Galway	2
RCB	Aidan Fogarty	Offaly	2
FB	Éamonn Cleary	Wexford	1
LCB	Dessie Donnelly	Antrim	1
RWB	Conal Bonnar	Tipperary	1
CB	Bobby Ryan	Tipperary	3
LWB	Seán Treacy	Galway	1
MD	Michael Coleman	Galway	1
MD	Declan Carr	Tipperary	1
RWF	Éanna Ryan	Galway	1
CF	Joe Cooney	Galway	4
LWF	Olcan McFetridge	Antrim	1
RCF	Pat Fox	Tipperary	2
FF	Cormac Bonnar	Tipperary	1
LCF	Nicky English	Tipperary	6

== 1990s ==
=== 1990 ===
Pos.	Player	Team	Appearances
GK	Ger Cunningham	Cork	4
RCB	John Considine	Cork	1
FB	Noel Sheehy	Tipperary	1
LCB	Seán O'Gorman	Cork	1
RWB	Pete Finnerty	Galway	5
CB	Jim Cashman	Cork	1
LWB	Liam Dunne	Wexford	1
MD	Michael Coleman	Galway	2
MD	Johnny Pilkington	Offaly	1
RWF	Michael Cleary	Tipperary	1
CF	Joe Cooney	Galway	5
LWF	Tony O'Sullivan	Cork	4
RCF	Eamon Morrissey	Kilkenny	1
FF	Brian McMahon	Dublin	1
LCF	John Fitzgibbon	Cork	1

=== 1991 ===
Pos.	Player	Team	Appearances
GK	Michael Walsh	Kilkenny	1
RCB	Paul Delaney	Tipperary	1
FB	Noel Sheehy	Tipperary	2
LCB	Seán Treacy	Galway	2
RWB	Conal Bonnar	Tipperary	2
CB	Jim Cashman	Cork	2
LWB	Cathal Casey	Cork	1
MD	Terence McNaughton	Antrim	1
MD	John Leahy	Tipperary	1
RWF	Michael Cleary	Tipperary	2
CF	Gary Kirby	Limerick	1
LWF	D. J. Carey	Kilkenny	1
RCF	Pat Fox	Tipperary	3
FF	Cormac Bonnar	Tipperary	2
LCF	John Fitzgibbon	Cork	2

=== 1992 ===
Pos.	Player	Team	Appearances
GK	Tommy Quaid	Limerick	1
RCB	Brian Corcoran	Cork	1
FB	Pat Dwyer	Kilkenny	1
LCB	Liam Simpson	Kilkenny	1
RWB	Brian Whelahan	Offaly	1
CB	Ciarán Carey	Limerick	1
LWB	Willie O'Connor	Kilkenny	1
MD	Michael Phelan	Kilkenny	1
MD	Seánie McCarthy	Cork	1
RWF	Gerard McGrattan	Down	1
CF	John Power	Kilkenny	1
LWF	Tony O'Sullivan	Cork	5
RCF	Michael Cleary	Tipperary	3
FF	Liam Fennelly	Kilkenny	4
LCF	D. J. Carey	Kilkenny	2

=== 1993 ===
Pos.	Player	Team	Appearances
GK	Michael Walsh	Kilkenny	2
RCB	Eddie O'Connor	Kilkenny	1
FB	Seán O'Gorman	Cork	2
LCB	Liam Simpson	Kilkenny	2
RWB	Liam Dunne	Wexford	2
CB	Pat O'Neill	Kilkenny	1
LWB	Pádraig Kelly	Galway	1
MD	Pat Malone	Galway	1
MD	Paul McKillen	Antrim	1
RWF	Martin Storey	Wexford	1
CF	John Power	Kilkenny	2
LWF	D. J. Carey	Kilkenny	3
RCF	Michael Cleary	Tipperary	4
FF	Joe Rabbitte	Galway	1
LCF	Barry Egan	Cork	1

=== 1994 ===
Pos.	Player	Team	Appearances
GK	Joe Quaid	Limerick	1
RCB	Anthony Daly	Clare	1
FB	Kevin Kinahan	Offaly	1
LCB	Martin Hanamy	Offaly	1
RWB	Dave Clarke	Limerick	1
CB	Hubert Rigney	Offaly	1
LWB	Kevin Martin	Offaly	1
MD	Mike Houlihan	Limerick	1
MD	Ciarán Carey	Limerick	2
RWF	Johnny Dooley	Offaly	1
CF	Gary Kirby	Limerick	2
LWF	John Leahy	Tipperary	2
RCF	Billy Dooley	Offaly	1
FF	D. J. Carey	Kilkenny	4
LCF	Damien Quigley	Limerick	1

=== 1995 ===
Pos.	Player	Team	Appearances
GK	Davy Fitzgerald	Clare	1
RCB	Kevin Kinahan	Offaly	2
FB	Brian Lohan^{HOTY}	Clare	1
LCB	Liam Doyle	Clare	1
RWB	Brian Whelahan	Offaly	2
CB	Seánie McMahon	Clare	1
LWB	Anthony Daly	Clare	2
MD	Michael Coleman	Galway	2
MD	Ollie Baker	Clare	1
RWF	Johnny Dooley	Offaly	2
CF	Gary Kirby	Limerick	3
LWF	Jamesie O'Connor	Clare	1
RCF	Billy Dooley	Offaly	2
FF	D. J. Carey	Kilkenny	5
LCF	Ger O'Loughlin	Clare	1

=== 1996 ===
Pos.	Player	Team	Appearances
GK	Joe Quaid	Limerick	2
RCB	Tom Helebert	Galway	1
FB	Brian Lohan	Clare	2
LCB	Larry O'Gorman	Wexford	1
RWB	Liam Dunne	Wexford	3
CB	Ciarán Carey	Limerick	3
LWB	Mark Foley^{YHOTY}	Limerick	1
MD	Adrian Fenlon	Wexford	1
MD	Mike Houlihan	Limerick	2
RWF	Rory McCarthy	Wexford	1
CF	Martin Storey^{HOTY}	Wexford	2
LWF	Larry Murphy	Wexford	1
RCF	Liam Cahill	Tipperary	1
FF	Gary Kirby	Limerick	4
LCF	Tom Dempsey	Wexford	1

=== 1997 ===
Pos.	Player	Team	Appearances
GK	Damien Fitzhenry	Wexford	1
RCB	Paul Shelly	Tipperary	1
FB	Brian Lohan	Clare	3
LCB	Willie O'Connor	Kilkenny	2
RWB	Liam Doyle	Clare	2
CB	Seánie McMahon	Clare	2
LWB	Liam Keoghan	Kilkenny	1
MD	Colin Lynch	Clare	1
MD	Tommy Dunne	Tipperary	1
RWF	Jamesie O'Connor	Clare	2
CF	Declan Ryan	Tipperary	2
LWF	John Leahy	Tipperary	3
RCF	Kevin Broderick	Galway	1
FF	Ger O'Loughlin	Clare	2
LCF	D. J. Carey	Kilkenny	6

List of nominees

=== 1998 ===
Pos.	Player	Team	Appearances
GK	Stephen Byrne	Offaly	1
RCB	Willie O'Connor	Kilkenny	3
FB	Kevin Kinahan	Offaly	3
LCB	Martin Hanamy	Offaly	3
RWB	Anthony Daly	Clare	3
CB	Seánie McMahon	Clare	3
LWB	Kevin Martin	Offaly	2
MD	Tony Browne	Waterford	1
MD	Ollie Baker	Clare	2
RWF	Michael Duignan	Offaly	1
CF	Martin Storey	Wexford	3
LWF	Jamesie O'Connor	Clare	3
RCF	Joe Dooley	Offaly	1
FF	Brian Whelahan	Offaly	3
LCF	Charlie Carter	Kilkenny	1

List of nominees

=== 1999 ===
Pos.	Player	Team	Appearances
GK	Dónal Óg Cusack	Cork	1
RCB	Fergal Ryan	Cork	1
FB	Diarmuid O'Sullivan	Cork	1
LCB	Frank Lohan	Clare	1
RWB	Brian Whelahan	Offaly	4
CB	Brian Corcoran	Cork	2
LWB	Peter Barry	Kilkenny	1
MD	Andy Comerford	Kilkenny	1
MD	Tommy Dunne	Tipperary	2
RWF	D. J. Carey	Kilkenny	7
CF	John Troy	Offaly	1
LWF	Brian McEvoy	Kilkenny	1
RCF	Seánie McGrath	Cork	1
FF	Joe Deane	Cork	1
LCF	Niall Gilligan	Clare	1

List of nominees

== 2000s ==
=== 2000 ===
Pos.	Player	Team	Appearances
GK	Brendan Cummins	Tipperary	1
RCB	Noel Hickey	Kilkenny	1
FB	Diarmuid O'Sullivan	Cork	2
LCB	Willie O'Connor	Kilkenny	4
RWB	John Carroll	Tipperary	1
CB	Eamonn Kennedy	Kilkenny	1
LWB	Peter Barry	Kilkenny	2
MD	Johnny Dooley	Offaly	3
MD	Andy Comerford	Kilkenny	2
RWF	Denis Byrne	Kilkenny	1
CF	Joe Rabbitte	Galway	2
LWF	Henry Shefflin	Kilkenny	1
RCF	Charlie Carter	Kilkenny	2
FF	D. J. Carey	Kilkenny	8
LCF	Joe Deane	Cork	2

List of nominees

=== 2001 ===
Pos.	Player	Team	Appearances
GK	Brendan Cummins	Tipperary	2
RCB	Darragh Ryan	Wexford	1
FB	Philip Maher	Tipperary	1
LCB	Ollie Canning	Galway	1
RWB	Eamonn Corcoran	Tipperary	1
CB	Liam Hodgins	Galway	1
LWB	Mark Foley	Limerick	2
MD	Tommy Dunne	Tipperary	3
MD	Eddie Enright	Tipperary	1
RWF	Mark O'Leary	Tipperary	1
CF	Jamesie O'Connor	Clare	4
LWF	Kevin Broderick	Galway	2
RCF	Charlie Carter	Kilkenny	3
FF	Eugene Cloonan	Galway	1
LCF	Eoin Kelly	Tipperary	1

List of nominees

=== 2002 ===
Pos.	Player	Team	Appearances
GK	Davy Fitzgerald	Clare	2
RCB	Michael Kavanagh	Kilkenny	1
FB	Brian Lohan	Clare	4
LCB	Philly Larkin	Kilkenny	1
RWB	Fergal Hartley	Waterford	1
CB	Peter Barry	Kilkenny	3
LWB	Paul Kelly	Tipperary	1
MD	Colin Lynch	Clare	2
MD	Derek Lyng	Kilkenny	1
RWF	Eoin Kelly	Waterford	1
CF	Henry Shefflin	Kilkenny	2
LWF	Ken McGrath	Waterford	1
RCF	Eoin Kelly	Tipperary	2
FF	Martin Comerford	Kilkenny	1
LCF	D. J. Carey	Kilkenny	9

List of nominees

=== 2003 ===
Pos.	Player	Team	Appearances
GK	Brendan Cummins	Tipperary	3
RCB	Michael Kavanagh	Kilkenny	2
FB	Noel Hickey	Kilkenny	2
LCB	Ollie Canning	Galway	2
RWB	Seán Óg Ó hAilpín	Cork	1
CB	Ronan Curran	Cork	1
LWB	J. J. Delaney	Kilkenny	1
MD	Derek Lyng	Kilkenny	2
MD	Tommy Walsh	Kilkenny	1
RWF	John Mullane	Waterford	1
CF	Henry Shefflin	Kilkenny	3
LWF	Eddie Brennan	Kilkenny	1
RCF	Setanta Ó hAilpín	Cork	1
FF	Martin Comerford	Kilkenny	2
LCF	Joe Deane	Cork	3

List of nominees

=== 2004 ===
Pos.	Player	Team	Appearances
GK	Damien Fitzhenry	Wexford	2
RCB	Wayne Sherlock	Cork	1
FB	Diarmuid O'Sullivan	Cork	3
LCB	Tommy Walsh	Kilkenny	2
RWB	J. J. Delaney	Kilkenny	2
CB	Ronan Curran	Cork	2
LWB	Seán Óg Ó hAilpín	Cork	2
MD	Ken McGrath	Waterford	2
MD	Jerry O'Connor	Cork	1
RWF	Dan Shanahan	Waterford	1
CF	Niall McCarthy	Cork	1
LWF	Henry Shefflin	Kilkenny	4
RCF	Eoin Kelly	Tipperary	3
FF	Brian Corcoran	Cork	3
LCF	Paul Flynn	Waterford	1

List of nominees

=== 2005 ===
Pos.	Player	Team	Appearances
GK	Davy Fitzgerald	Clare	3
RCB	Pat Mulcahy	Cork	1
FB	Diarmuid O'Sullivan	Cork	4
LCB	Ollie Canning	Galway	3
RWB	Derek Hardiman	Galway	1
CB	John Gardiner	Cork	1
LWB	Seán Óg Ó hAilpín	Cork	3
MD	Jerry O'Connor	Cork	2
MD	Paul Kelly	Tipperary	2
RWF	Ben O'Connor	Cork	1
CF	Henry Shefflin	Kilkenny	5
LWF	Tommy Walsh	Kilkenny	3
RCF	Ger Farragher	Galway	1
FF	Eoin Kelly	Tipperary	4
LCF	Damien Hayes	Galway	1

List of nominees

=== 2006 ===
Pos.	Player	Team	Appearances
GK	Dónal Óg Cusack	Cork	2
RCB	Eoin Murphy	Waterford	1
FB	J. J. Delaney	Kilkenny	3
LCB	Brian Murphy	Cork	1
RWB	Tony Browne	Waterford	2
CB	Ronan Curran	Cork	3
LWB	Tommy Walsh	Kilkenny	4
MD	Jerry O'Connor	Cork	3
MD	James "Cha" Fitzpatrick	Kilkenny	1
RWF	Dan Shanahan	Waterford	2
CF	Henry Shefflin	Kilkenny	6
LWF	Eddie Brennan	Kilkenny	2
RCF	Eoin Kelly	Tipperary	5
FF	Martin Comerford	Kilkenny	3
LCF	Tony Griffin	Clare	1

List of nominees

=== 2007 ===
Details

Pos.	Player	Team	Appearances
GK	Brian Murray	Limerick	1
RCB	Michael Kavanagh	Kilkenny	3
FB	Declan Fanning	Tipperary	1
LCB	Jackie Tyrrell	Kilkenny	1
RWB	Tommy Walsh	Kilkenny	5
CB	Ken McGrath	Waterford	3
LWB	Tony Browne	Waterford	3
MD	Michael Walsh	Waterford	1
MD	James 'Cha' Fitzpatrick	Kilkenny	2
RWF	Dan Shanahan^{HOTY}	Waterford	3
CF	Ollie Moran	Limerick	1
LWF	Stephen Molumphy	Waterford	1
RCF	Andrew O'Shaughnessy	Limerick	1
FF	Henry Shefflin	Kilkenny	7
LCF	Eddie Brennan	Kilkenny	3

List of nominees

=== 2008 ===
Details

Pos.	Player	Team	Appearances
GK	Brendan Cummins	Tipperary	4
RCB	Michael Kavanagh	Kilkenny	4
FB	Noel Hickey	Kilkenny	3
LCB	Jackie Tyrrell	Kilkenny	2
RWB	Tommy Walsh	Kilkenny	6
CB	Conor O'Mahony	Tipperary	1
LWB	J. J. Delaney	Kilkenny	4
MD	James 'Cha' Fitzpatrick	Kilkenny	3
MD	Shane McGrath	Tipperary	1
RWF	Ben O'Connor	Cork	2
CF	Henry Shefflin	Kilkenny	8
LWF	Eoin Larkin^{HOTY}	Kilkenny	1
RCF	Eddie Brennan	Kilkenny	4
FF	Eoin Kelly	Waterford	2
LCF	Joe Canning^{YHOTY}	Galway	1

List of nominees

=== 2009 ===
Details

Pos.	Player	Team	Appearances
GK	P. J. Ryan	Kilkenny	1
RCB	Ollie Canning	Galway	4
FB	Pádraic Maher	Tipperary	1
LCB	Jackie Tyrrell	Kilkenny	3
RWB	Tommy Walsh^{HOTY}	Kilkenny	7
CB	Michael Walsh	Waterford	2
LWB	Conor O'Mahony	Tipperary	2
MD	Michael Rice	Kilkenny	1
MD	Alan McCrabbe	Dublin	1
RWF	Lar Corbett	Tipperary	1
CF	Henry Shefflin	Kilkenny	9
LWF	Eoin Larkin	Kilkenny	2
RCF	Noel McGrath^{YHOTY}	Tipperary	1
FF	Joe Canning	Galway	2
LCF	John Mullane	Waterford	2

List of nominees

== 2010s ==
=== 2010 ===
Details

Pos.	Player	Team	Appearances
GK	Brendan Cummins	Tipperary	5
RCB	Noel Connors	Waterford	1
FB	Paul Curran	Tipperary	1
LCB	Jackie Tyrrell	Kilkenny	4
RWB	Tommy Walsh	Kilkenny	8
CB	Michael Walsh	Waterford	3
LWB	J. J. Delaney	Kilkenny	5
MD	Michael Fennelly	Kilkenny	1
MD	Brendan Maher^{YHOTY}	Tipperary	1
RWF	Damien Hayes	Galway	2
CF	Noel McGrath	Tipperary	2
LWF	Lar Corbett^{HOTY}	Tipperary	2
RCF	John Mullane	Waterford	3
FF	Richie Power	Kilkenny	1
LCF	Eoin Kelly	Tipperary	6

List of nominees

=== 2011 ===
Details

Pos.	Player	Team	Appearances
GK	Gary Maguire	Dublin	1
RCB	Paul Murphy	Kilkenny	1
FB	Paul Curran	Tipperary	2
LCB	Michael Cahill	Tipperary	1
RWB	Tommy Walsh	Kilkenny	9
CB	Brian Hogan	Kilkenny	1
LWB	Pádraic Maher	Tipperary	2
MD	Liam Rushe	Dublin	1
MD	Michael Fennelly^{HOTY}	Kilkenny	2
RWF	Michael Rice	Kilkenny	2
CF	Richie Power	Kilkenny	2
LWF	Henry Shefflin	Kilkenny	10
RCF	John Mullane	Waterford	4
FF	Lar Corbett	Tipperary	3
LCF	Richie Hogan	Kilkenny	1

List of nominees

=== 2012 ===
Details

Pos.	Player	Team	Appearances
GK	Anthony Nash	Cork	1
RCB	Paul Murphy	Kilkenny	2
FB	J. J. Delaney	Kilkenny	6
LCB	Fergal Moore	Galway	1
RWB	Brendan Bugler	Clare	1
CB	Brian Hogan	Kilkenny	2
LWB	David Collins	Galway	1
MD	Iarla Tannian	Galway	1
MD	Kevin Moran	Waterford	1
RWF	T. J. Reid	Kilkenny	1
CF	Henry Shefflin^{HOTY}	Kilkenny	11
LWF	Damien Hayes	Galway	3
RCF	John Mullane	Waterford	5
FF	Joe Canning	Galway	3
LCF	David Burke	Galway	1

List of nominees

=== 2013 ===
Pos.	Player	Team	Appearances
GK	Anthony Nash	Cork	2
RCB	Richie McCarthy	Limerick	1
FB	Peter Kelly	Dublin	1
LCB	David McInerney	Clare	1
RWB	Brendan Bugler	Clare	2
CB	Liam Rushe	Dublin	2
LWB	Patrick Donnellan	Clare	1
MD	Colm Galvin	Clare	1
MD	Conor Ryan	Clare	1
RWF	Séamus Harnedy	Cork	1
CF	Tony Kelly^{HOTY, YHOTY}	Clare	1
LWF	Danny Sutcliffe	Dublin	1
RCF	Podge Collins	Clare	1
FF	Patrick Horgan	Cork	1
LCF	Conor McGrath	Clare	1

List of nominees

=== 2014 ===
Pos.	Player	Team	Appearances
GK	Darren Gleeson	Tipperary	1
RCB	Paul Murphy	Kilkenny	3
FB	J. J. Delaney	Kilkenny	7
LCB	Séamus Hickey	Limerick	1
RWB	Brendan Maher	Tipperary	2
CB	Pádraic Maher	Tipperary	3
LWB	Cillian Buckley	Kilkenny	1
MD	Richie Hogan^{HOTY}	Kilkenny	2
MD	Shane McGrath	Tipperary	2
RWF	John O'Dwyer	Tipperary	1
CF	Patrick Maher	Tipperary	1
LWF	T. J. Reid	Kilkenny	2
RCF	Colin Fennelly	Kilkenny	1
FF	Séamus Callanan	Tipperary	1
LCF	Shane Dowling	Limerick	1

List of nominees

=== 2015 ===
Pos.	Player	Team	Appearances
GK	Colm Callanan	Galway	1
RCB	Paul Murphy	Kilkenny	4
FB	Joey Holden	Kilkenny	1
LCB	Noel Connors	Waterford	2
RWB	Daithí Burke	Galway	1
CB	Tadhg de Búrca^{YHOTY}	Waterford	1
LWB	Cillian Buckley	Kilkenny	2
MD	Michael Fennelly	Kilkenny	3
MD	David Burke	Galway	2
RWF	Cathal Mannion	Galway	1
CF	Richie Hogan	Kilkenny	3
LWF	T. J. Reid^{HOTY}	Kilkenny	3
RCF	Ger Aylward	Kilkenny	1
FF	Séamus Callanan	Tipperary	2
LCF	Maurice Shanahan	Waterford	1

List of nominees

=== 2016 ===
Pos.	Player	Team	Appearances
GK	Eoin Murphy	Kilkenny	1
RCB	Cathal Barrett	Tipperary	1
FB	James Barry	Tipperary	1
LCB	Daithí Burke	Galway	2
RWB	Pádraig Walsh	Kilkenny	1
CB	Ronan Maher	Tipperary	1
LWB	Pádraic Maher	Tipperary	4
MD	Jamie Barron	Waterford	1
MD	David Burke	Galway	3
RWF	Walter Walsh	Kilkenny	1
CF	Austin Gleeson^{HOTY, YHOTY}	Waterford	1
LWF	Patrick Maher	Tipperary	2
RCF	Richie Hogan	Kilkenny	4
FF	Séamus Callanan	Tipperary	3
LCF	John McGrath	Tipperary	1

List of nominees

=== 2017 ===
Pos.	Player	Team	Appearances
GK	Stephen O'Keeffe	Waterford	1
RCB	Pádraic Mannion	Galway	1
FB	Daithí Burke	Galway	3
LCB	Noel Connors	Waterford	3
RWB	Pádraic Maher	Tipperary	5
CB	Gearóid McInerney	Galway	1
LWB	Mark Coleman	Cork	1
MD	Jamie Barron	Waterford	2
MD	David Burke	Galway	4
RWF	Kevin Moran	Waterford	2
CF	Joe Canning^{HOTY}	Galway	4
LWF	Michael Walsh	Waterford	4
RCF	Conor Whelan^{YHOTY}	Galway	1
FF	Conor Cooney	Galway	1
LCF	Patrick Horgan	Cork	2

List of nominees

=== 2018 ===
Pos.	Player	Team	Appearances
GK	Eoin Murphy	Kilkenny	2
RCB	Seán Finn	Limerick	1
FB	Daithí Burke	Galway	4
LCB	Richie English	Limerick	1
RWB	Pádraic Mannion	Galway	2
CB	Declan Hannon	Limerick	1
LWB	Dan Morrissey	Limerick	1
MD	Cian Lynch^{HOTY}	Limerick	1
MD	Darragh Fitzgibbon	Cork	1
RWF	Peter Duggan	Clare	1
CF	Joe Canning	Galway	5
LWF	Séamus Harnedy	Cork	2
RCF	Patrick Horgan	Cork	3
FF	John Conlon	Clare	1
LCF	Graeme Mulcahy	Limerick	1

List of nominees

=== 2019 ===
Pos.	Player	Team	Appearances
GK	Brian Hogan	Tipperary	1
RCB	Seán Finn	Limerick	2
FB	Ronan Maher	Tipperary	2
LCB	Cathal Barrett	Tipperary	2
RWB	Brendan Maher	Tipperary	3
CB	Pádraig Walsh	Kilkenny	2
LWB	Pádraic Maher	Tipperary	6
MD	Noel McGrath	Tipperary	3
MD	Diarmuid O'Keeffe	Wexford	1
RWF	Lee Chin	Wexford	1
CF	T. J. Reid	Kilkenny	4
LWF	Colin Fennelly	Kilkenny	2
RCF	Aaron Gillane	Limerick	1
FF	Séamus Callanan^{HOTY}	Tipperary	4
LCF	Patrick Horgan	Cork	4

List of nominees

== 2020s ==
=== 2020 ===
Pos.	Player	Team	Appearances
GK	Nickie Quaid	Limerick	1
RCB	Seán Finn	Limerick	3
FB	Dan Morrissey	Limerick	2
LCB	Daithí Burke	Galway	5
RWB	Diarmaid Byrnes	Limerick	1
CB	Tadhg de Búrca	Waterford	2
LWB	Kyle Hayes	Limerick	1
MD	Jamie Barron	Waterford	3
MD	Tony Kelly	Clare	2
RWF	Gearóid Hegarty^{HOTY}	Limerick	1
CF	Cian Lynch	Limerick	2
LWF	Tom Morrissey	Limerick	1
RCF	Aaron Gillane	Limerick	2
FF	T. J. Reid	Kilkenny	5
LCF	Stephen Bennett	Waterford	1

Like of nominees

=== 2021 ===
Pos.	Player	Team	Appearances
GK	Eoin Murphy	Kilkenny	3
RCB	Seán Finn	Limerick	4
FB	Conor Prunty	Waterford	1
LCB	Barry Nash	Limerick	1
RWB	Diarmaid Byrnes	Limerick	2
CB	Declan Hannon	Limerick	2
LWB	Kyle Hayes	Limerick	2
MD	William O'Donoghue	Limerick	1
MD	Darragh O'Donovan	Limerick	1
RWF	Gearóid Hegarty	Limerick	2
CF	Cian Lynch^{HOTY}	Limerick	3
LWF	Tom Morrissey	Limerick	2
RCF	Tony Kelly	Clare	3
FF	Séamus Flanagan	Limerick	1
LCF	Peter Casey	Limerick	1

List of nominees

=== 2022 ===
Pos.	Player	Team	Appearances
GK	Nickie Quaid	Limerick	2
RCB	Mikey Butler^{YHOTY}	Kilkenny	1
FB	Huw Lawlor	Kilkenny	1
LCB	Barry Nash	Limerick	2
RWB	Diarmaid Byrnes^{HOTY}	Limerick	3
CB	Declan Hannon	Limerick	3
LWB	Pádraic Mannion	Galway	3
MD	David Fitzgerald	Clare	1
MD	Adrian Mullen	Kilkenny	1
RWF	Gearóid Hegarty	Limerick	3
CF	Kyle Hayes	Limerick	3
LWF	Shane O'Donnell	Clare	1
RCF	Aaron Gillane	Limerick	3
FF	T. J. Reid	Kilkenny	6
LCF	Tony Kelly	Clare	4

List of nominees

=== 2023 ===
Pos.	Player	Team	Appearances
GK	Eoin Murphy	Kilkenny	4
RCB	Mikey Butler	Kilkenny	2
FB	Huw Lawlor	Kilkenny	2
LCB	Dan Morrissey	Limerick	3
RWB	Diarmaid Byrnes	Limerick	4
CB	John Conlon	Clare	2
LWB	Kyle Hayes	Limerick	4
MD	Darragh O'Donovan	Limerick	2
MD	William O'Donoghue	Limerick	2
RWF	Shane O'Donnell	Clare	2
CF	T. J. Reid	Kilkenny	7
LWF	Tom Morrissey	Limerick	3
RCF	Conor Whelan	Galway	2
FF	Aaron Gillane^{HOTY}	Limerick	4
LCF	Eoin Cody	Kilkenny	1

=== 2024 ===
Pos.	Player	Team	Appearances
GK	Nickie Quaid	Limerick	3
RCB	Adam Hogan^{YHOTY}	Clare	1
FB	Eoin Downey	Cork	1
LCB	Dan Morrissey	Limerick	4
RWB	David McInerney	Clare	2
CB	Robert Downey	Cork	1
LWB	Kyle Hayes	Limerick	5
MD	Tony Kelly	Clare	5
MD	Darragh Fitzgibbon	Cork	2
RWF	David Fitzgerald	Clare	2
CF	Shane Barrett	Cork	1
LWF	Seamus Harnedy	Cork	3
RCF	Gearóid Hegarty	Limerick	4
FF	Shane O'Donnell^{HOTY}	Clare	3
LCF	Mark Rodgers	Clare	1

=== 2025 ===
Pos.	Player	Team	Appearances
GK	Rhys Shelly	Tipperary	1
RCB	Robert Doyle	Tipperary	1
FB	Huw Lawlor	Kilkenny	3
LCB	Seán O'Donoghue	Cork	1
RWB	Eoghan Connolly	Tipperary	1
CB	Ronan Maher	Tipperary	3
LWB	Ciarán Joyce	Cork	1
MD	Cathal Mannion	Galway	2
MD	Darragh Fitzgibbon	Cork	3
RWF	Jake Morris	Tipperary	1
CF	Andrew Ormond	Tipperary	1
LWF	Cian O'Sullivan	Dublin	1
RCF	Martin Keoghan	Kilkenny	1
FF	John McGrath^{HOTY}	Tipperary	2
LCF	Brian Hayes	Cork	1

=== 2026 ===
Nominations announced on September 23, 2026

== Use of colours above ==
Colour	Meaning
	Had previously appeared on an All-Stars team
