= Ronan Curran =

Irish hurling manager and former hurler

Personal information
- Native name: Ronán Ó Corráin (Irish)
- Born: 26 February 1981 (age 45) Cork, Ireland
- Occupation: Sales manager
- Height: 6 ft 1 in (185 cm)

Sport
- Sport: Hurling
- Position: Centre-back
Club
| Years | Club | Apps (scores) |
| 1999-2014 | St Finbarr's | 42 (2-28) |
Club titles
- Cork titles: 0
College
- Years: College
- Cork Institute of Technology
College titles
- Fitzgibbon titles: 0
Inter-county*
| Years | County | Apps (scores) |
| 2001–2011 | Cork | 46 (0–03) |
Inter-county titles
- Munster titles: 3
- All-Irelands: 2
- NHL: 0
- All Stars: 3
- *Inter County team apps and scores correct as of 15:13, 17 April 2019.

Ronan Curran (born 26 February 1981) is an Irish hurling manager and former hurler who played for Cork Senior Championship club St Finbarr's. He is the current manager of the Kanturk senior hurling team. Curran played for the Cork senior hurling team for 10 years, during which time he made a record number of appearances as a centre-back. Described as the outstanding centre-back of the decade, his half-back-line partnership with Seán Óg Ó hAilpín and John Gardiner is regarded as one of the greatest of all time.

Curran began his career at club level with St Finbarr's. After championship success in the minor grades in both hurling and Gaelic football, he spent much of his adult career as a dual player at the highest level. Curran enjoyed his only success at senior level when he won a Premier Intermediate Football Championship medal in 2008 and a return to the top flight of Cork football. His early prowess also saw him selected for the Cork Institute of Technology in the Fitzgibbon Cup.

At inter-county level, Curran was part of the successful Cork minor team that won the All-Ireland Championship in 1998 before an unsuccessful three-year stint with the under-21 team. He joined the Cork senior team in 2001. Curran eventually became Cork's first-choice centre-back and made a combined total of 97 National League and Championship appearances in a career that ended with his last game in 2011. During that time he was part of two All-Ireland Championship-winning teams – in 2004 and 2005. Curran also secured three Munster Championship medals. He announced his retirement from inter-county hurling on 24 August 2011.

Curran won his first All-Star in 2003, before claiming a further two All-Stars in 2004 and 2006. At inter-provincial level, he was selected to play in three championship campaigns with Munster, with his sole Railway Cup medal being won in 2005.

== Playing career ==
=== Club ===
Curran plays his club hurling and Gaelic football with St Finbarr's club on the south side of Cork city. He first came to prominence as a dual player at under-age levels; however, he experienced little success in the minor or under-21 grades.

In 2007, after fifty years of playing in the top flight of the county senior football championship, St Finbarr's were relegated to the intermediate level. This grade of football did not pose and problem to Curran's side, as they reached the final in 2008. St Vincent's provided the opposition on that occasion; however, 'the Barr's' were held to a draw. The replay a week later was more conclusive. St Finbarr's won by 2–13 to 0–14, giving Curran a county premier intermediate championship winners' medal.

=== Minor and under-21 ===
Curran first came to prominence on the inter-county scene as a dual player in the late 1990s. In 1998 he was a key member of the Cork minor hurling team that reached the provincial decider. Clare provided the opposition on that occasion, however, they proved no match for a superior Cork side. A 3–13 to 0–8 trouncing gave Curran a Munster minor hurling winners' medal. Cork later qualified for the All-Ireland final against arch-rivals Kilkenny with Curran lining out at centre-back. The game proved to be an easy one for the young 'Rebels', as Cork won by 2–15 to 1–9. It was Curran's first All-Ireland winners' medal in the minor hurling grade.

Cork surrendered their provincial hurling title in 1999, however, Curran enjoyed some more success with the Cork minor football team. That year he won a Munster winners' medal with the Cork minor football team following a 2–16 to 1–9 defeat of old rivals Kerry. Cork, however, were subsequently defeated in the All-Ireland semi-final.

Curran subsequently joined the Cork under-21 football and hurling teams; however, he experienced little success in this grade.

=== Senior ===
Curran's performances at under-age levels brought him to the attentions of the Cork selectors at senior level. He made his senior championship debut in 2003, a year which saw Cork's players emerge from a bitter stand-off with the county board and reach the Munster final for the first time in three years. Waterford provided the opposition on that occasion as one of hurling's modern rivalries began in earnest. An exciting game resulted between the two teams; however, victory went to Cork by 3–16 to 3–12. It was Curran's first Munster winners' medal in the senior grade and it gave a signal that Cork were back. Cork were hot favourites going into the subsequent All-Ireland semi-final against Wexford, however, it was far from a walkover. In one of the most exciting games of the championship both sides finished level: Cork 2–20, Wexford 3–17. Both sides met again six days later with Cork making no mistake and taking the spoils on a score line of 3–17 to 2–7. This win set up an All-Ireland final meeting with Kilkenny. In another thrilling game of hurling both teams were level for much of the game, exchanging tit-for-tat scores. A Setanta Ó hAilpín goal steadied the Cork ship, however, a Martin Comerford goal five minutes from the end settled the game as Kilkenny went on to win by 1–14 to 1–11.

2004 saw Cork reach the Munster final once again and, for the second consecutive year, Waterford provided the opposition. In what many consider to be the greatest provincial decider of them all, both sides fought tooth-and-nail for the full seventy minutes. Unfortunately for Curran, Cork lost the game by just a single point on a score line of Waterford 3–16, Cork 1–21. Although Cork surrendered their provincial crown they were still in with a chance of landing the All-Ireland title. After manoeuvring through the qualifiers Cork reached a second consecutive All-Ireland final and, once again, Kilkenny provided the opposition. This game took on a life of its own for a number of reasons. Chief among these was that Kilkenny were attempting to capture a third All-Ireland title in-a-row and go one ahead of Cork in the All-Ireland roll of honour. The game was expected to be another classic; however, a damp day put an end to this. The first half was a low-scoring affair and provided little excitement for fans. The second-half saw Cork completely take over. For the last twenty-three minutes Cork scored nine unanswered points and went on to win the game by 0–17 to 0–9. It was Curran's first All-Ireland winners' medal.

In 2005 Cork were on form again and the team won back the provincial crown that year with a 1–12 to 1–16 victory over Tipperary. It was Currna's second Munster winners' medal as Cork went on the march for glory once again. In the All-Ireland semi-final against Clare their championship campaign was nearly derailed when they fell behind by seven points at the start of the second-half. A huge performance by Cork turned this deficit around and Cork went on to win the game by 0–16 to 0–15. While it was expected that Cork and Kilkenny would do battle again in a third consecutive All-Ireland final Galway were the surprise winners of the second semi-final. It was the first meeting of Cork and Galway in an All-Ireland final since 1990 and even more daunting was the fact that men from the west had never beaten Cork in a championship decider. Once again neither side broke away into a considerable lead, however, at the final whistle Cork were ahead by 1–21 to 1–16. For the second year in-a-row Cork were the All-Ireland champions and Curran collected his second winners' medal.

2006 saw Cork turn their attentions to a first three-in-a-row of All-Ireland titles since 1978. The team's championship campaign got off to a good start with a 0–20 to 0–14 defeat of Clare in the opening round of the Munster championship. The subsequent provincial decider saw Cork take on Tipp for the second consecutive year. Star forward Joe Deane was to the fore, scoring an impressive eight points and contributing greatly to Cork's 2–11 to 1–11 victory over their old rivals. Subsequent victories over Limerick and Waterford saw Cork qualify for their fourth consecutive All-Ireland final and for the third time Kilkenny were the opponents. Like previous encounters neither side took a considerable lead, however, Kilkenny had a vital goal from Aidan Fogarty. Cork were in arrears coming into the final few minutes, however, Ben O'Connor goaled for Cork. It was too little too late as 'the Cats' denied 'the Rebels' the three-in-a-row on a score line of 1–16 to 1–13.

In 2007 Cork were out foe redemption, however, their championship ambitions were hampered from the beginning. The so-called Semplegate affair resulted in Seán Óg Ó hAilpín, Donal Óg Cusack and Diarmuid O'Sullivan being suspended for a crucial Munster semi-final clash with Waterford. In spite of being without three of their best players Cork put up a good fight but only lost by a goal. After manoeuvring through the qualifiers Cork reached the All-Ireland quarter-final. Once again Waterford provided the opposition as the game controversially ended in a draw – 3–16 apiece. The replay was less exciting; however, it was still a good game as Waterford triumphed by 2–17 to 0–20.

The activities of the Cork footballers and their reaction to the appointment of Teddy Holland as their new manager impacted greatly on the preparations of the Cork hurling team. The entire panel went on a sympathy strike and missed the opening games of the National League. In the end the Cork hurlers returned to duty, however, their first championship game resulted in a defeat by Tipperary and 'the Rebels' had to take their chances in the win-or-bust qualifiers. A goal by Joe Deane in their next outing helped Cork to limp over the finish line against Dublin. The team's overall performance was less than impressive in the 1–17 to 0–15 win. Cork's next game saw Galway, a team regarded as one of the best in the country, provide the opposition. The first half was a poor affair with Cork's goalkeeper, Donal Óg Cusack, being sent off. In the second-half Cork took charge and secured a 0–23 to 2–15 victory and a place in the All-Ireland quarter-final. Clare were the opposition on that occasion and, once again, Cork gave a poor first-half display. The second half was a different story with Cork taking charge once again and securing a 2–19 to 2–17 victory. This win allowed Cork to advance to the All-Ireland semi-final where Kilkenny provided the opposition. It was the first time that these two teams met in the championship outside of an All-Ireland final. That game was an intriguing encounter; however, 'the Cats' won the day by 1–23 to 0–17.

Following the defeat by Kilkenny in 2008 manager Gerald McCarthy's two-year contract came to an end. He was later re-appointed for a further two-year term by the Cork County Board, in spite of the majority of the players not wanting him to stay on. The players on the 2008 panel, with Curran playing a low-key role in the strike, refused to play or train under McCarthy. (see 2008-2009 Cork players strike). McCarthy accordingly began the 2009 National League campaign with a new squad, none of whom had been able to make the previous year's panel. After months of pressure McCarthy eventually stepped down as manager.

Following the resolution to these difficulties Cork were defeated by Tipperary on a score line of 1–19 to 0–19 in the opening round of the Munster campaign. After a convincing win over Offaly the next assignment for Curran's Cork team was a win-or-bust All-Ireland qualifier meeting with Galway. Cork faltered in the final ten minutes as 'the Tribesmen' knocked 'the Rebels' out of the championship by 1–19 to 0–15.

Curran announced his retirement from inter county hurling in the Irish Examiner newspaper on Wednesday 24 August 2011, stating he felt the time was right to go as he wasn't getting any younger.

=== Inter-provincial ===
Curran has also lined out with Munster in the Railway Cup inter-provincial competition. He played with the province for the first time in 2003, however, Munster were defeated by Connacht in the semi-final by four points. The following year Curran was on the team again as Munster reached the final. Connacht were the opponents again with the western province taking the title with a 1–15 to 0–9 score line. 2005 saw Curran line out in a second Railway Cup final. Leinster provided the opposition on that occasion, however, victory went to Munster by 1–21 to 2–14, giving Curran a Railway Cup winners' medal.

== Managerial career ==
=== St Finbarr's ===
Curran was ratified as the manager of the St Finbarr's senior team on 12 December 2017. His first championship game in charge on 29 April 2018 saw St Finbarr's suffer a 1–13 to 0–14 defeat by Newcestown. In spite of this defeat, Curran's side reached the quarter-finals on 15 September 2018; however, St Finbarr's were beaten by Blackrock on a 1–20 to 1–11 scoreline.

Curran's second championship season in charge saw St Finbarr's remain undefeated in their opening three games. On 6 October 2019, St Finbarr's suffered a 3–19 to 1-19 semi-final defeat by Imokilly. Curran stepped down as manager shortly after this defeat.

=== Kanturk ===
Curran was appointed manager of the Kanturk senior hurling team in advance of the 2020 championship.

== Career statistics ==
=== Club ===
| Team | Year | Cork SHC | |
| Team | Year | Apps | Score |
|---|---|---|---|
| St Finbarr's | 1999 | 4 | 0-02 |
| St Finbarr's | 2000 | 2 | 0-00 |
| St Finbarr's | 2001 | 1 | 0-00 |
| St Finbarr's | 2002 | 2 | 0-01 |
| St Finbarr's | 2003 | 2 | 0-00 |
| St Finbarr's | 2004 | 3 | 1-02 |
| St Finbarr's | 2005 | 4 | 1-09 |
| St Finbarr's | 2006 | 2 | 0-01 |
| St Finbarr's | 2007 | 5 | 0-06 |
| St Finbarr's | 2008 | 3 | 0-01 |
| St Finbarr's | 2009 | 4 | 0-01 |
| St Finbarr's | 2010 | 3 | 0-01 |
| St Finbarr's | 2011 | 2 | 0-03 |
| St Finbarr's | 2012 | 2 | 0-01 |
| St Finbarr's | 2013 | — | |
| St Finbarr's | 2014 | 3 | 0-00 |
| Career total | | 42 | 2-28 |

=== Inter-county ===
| Team | Year | National League | | | Munster | | All-Ireland | | Total | |
| Team | Year | Division | Apps | Score | Apps | Score | Apps | Score | Apps | Score |
|---|---|---|---|---|---|---|---|---|---|---|
| Cork Minor | 1998 | — | | | 3 | 0-00 | 2 | 0-00 | 5 | 0-00 |
| Cork Minor | 1999 | — | | | 1 | 0-00 | — | | 1 | 0-00 |
| Cork Minor | Total | — | | | 4 | 0-00 | 2 | 0-00 | 6 | 0-00 |
| Cork U21 | 2000 | — | | | 2 | 0-00 | — | | 2 | 0-00 |
| Cork U21 | 2001 | — | | | 2 | 0-00 | — | | 2 | 0-00 |
| Cork U21 | 2002 | — | | | 1 | 0-00 | — | | 1 | 0-00 |
| Cork U21 | Total | — | | | 5 | 0-00 | — | | 5 | 0-00 |
| Cork | 2001 | Division 1B | 1 | 0-00 | — | | — | | 1 | 0-00 |
| Cork | 2002 | Division 1B | — | | — | | — | | — | |
| Cork | 2003 | Division 1B | 8 | 0-01 | 2 | 0-00 | 3 | 0-00 | 13 | 0-01 |
| Cork | 2004 | Division 1B | 7 | 0-00 | 3 | 0-02 | 4 | 0-00 | 14 | 0-02 |
| Cork | 2005 | Division 1B | 6 | 0-00 | 2 | 0-00 | 3 | 0-00 | 11 | 0-00 |
| Cork | 2006 | Division 1A | 5 | 0-01 | 2 | 0-01 | 3 | 0-00 | 10 | 0-02 |
| Cork | 2007 | Division 1A | 7 | 0-01 | 2 | 0-00 | 5 | 0-00 | 14 | 0-01 |
| Cork | 2008 | Division 1A | 1 | 0-00 | 1 | 0-00 | 4 | 0-00 | 6 | 0-00 |
| Cork | 2009 | Division 1 | 4 | 0-00 | 1 | 0-00 | 2 | 0-00 | 7 | 0-00 |
| Cork | 2010 | Division 1 | 7 | 0-01 | 4 | 0-00 | 2 | 0-00 | 13 | 0-01 |
| Cork | 2011 | Division 1 | 5 | 0-01 | 0 | 0-00 | 3 | 0-00 | 8 | 0-01 |
| Cork | Total | | 51 | 0-05 | 17 | 0-03 | 29 | 0-00 | 97 | 0-08 |
| Career total | | | 51 | 0-05 | 26 | 0-03 | 31 | 0-00 | 106 | 0-08 |

== Honours ==
=== Player ===
St Finbarr's

- Cork Premier Intermediate Football Championship (1): 2008
- Cork Premier Minor Hurling Championship (1): 1997

Cork

- All-Ireland Senior Hurling Championship (2): 2004, 2005
- Munster Senior Hurling Championship (3): 2003, 2005, 2006
- All-Ireland Minor Hurling Championship (1): 1998
- Munster Minor Hurling Championship (1): 1998

=== Management ===
Cork

- All-Ireland Under-20 Hurling Championship (1): 2023
- Munster Under-20 Hurling Championship (1): 2023
