= Pat McLoughney =

Pat McLoughney may refer to:

- Pat McLoughney (Tipperary hurler) (born 1954), Irish hurler
- Pat McLoughney (Offaly hurler) (1949–2018), Irish hurling selector and player
