= Teu Ó hAilpín =

Irish hurler and Gaelic footballer

Personal information
- Native name: Teu Ó hAilpín (Irish)
- Born: Cork, Ireland

Sport
- Football Position: -
- Hurling Position: -
Clubs
- Years: Club
- Na Piarsaigh; Éi
Inter-county**
Years	County	Apps (scores)
2001 - ?	Clare (F)	-
Inter-county titles
	Football	Hurling
Munster Titles	-	-
- **Inter County team apps and scores correct as of (00:03, 6 September 2006 (UTC)).

Teu Ó hAilpín is an Irish sportsperson (Gaelic footballer) playing for Na Piarsaigh GAA and Australian Rules football club Leeside Lions.

Born in Cork, he was a Gaelic Athletic Association player who played for the Éire Óg club in Ennis and Na Piarsaigh in Cork. He is the brother of Cork senior hurling players Seán Óg Ó hAilpín and Aisake and older brother of Carlton Australian footballer Setanta. He left Cork City team Na Piarsaigh in 2001 and signed for Clare side Éire Óg. Teu declared for Clare in 2001, despite having played for minor and Under-21 level for Cork, he later moved to London after a short term in intercounty senior football. Ó hAilpín won the London Senior Hurling Championship with London GAA side Robert Emmett's in 2004.

== Leeside Lions career ==
Ó hAilpín decided to quit Gaelic football and joined Australian rules football club Leeside Lions in the Australian Rules Football League of Ireland (ARFLI). He immediately became a star and helped them to win the 2007 Premiership with Tadhg Kennelly's cousin, Denis Kennelly.
