= Michael Bond (hurler) =

Irish hurler

Personal information
- Native name: Mícheál de Bond (Irish)
- Born: 1948 (age 77–78) Ardrahan, County Galway, Ireland
- Occupation: Retired secondary school principal

Sport
- Sport: Hurling
- Position: Centre-forward
Club
- Years: Club
- Ardrahan
Club titles
- Galway titles: 3
- Connacht titles: 3
Inter-county*
Years	County	Apps (scores)
1968–1975	Galway	3
Inter-county titles
- All-Irelands: 0
- NHL: 0
- All Stars: 0
- *Inter County team apps and scores correct as of 17:25, 28 February 2015.

Michael Bond (born 1948) is an Irish retired hurler who played as a centre-forward for the Galway senior team.

Born in Ardrahan, County Galway, Bond first arrived at the inter-county scene at the age of seventeen when he first linked up with the Galway minor team before later joining the under-21 side. He joined the senior panel during the 1968 championship. Bond was a regular member of the panel, but ended his playing days without silverware.

At club level, Bond was a three-time Connacht medallist with Ardrahan. In addition to this, he also won three championship medals.

Throughout his career, Bond made three championship appearances. He retired from inter-county hurling in 1975.

In retirement from playing, Bond became involved in team management and coaching. After training the Galway minor, under-21 and junior teams, he managed Offaly to All-Ireland success in 1998.

== Playing career ==
=== Club ===
In 1974 Bond won his first championship medal following a 2-10 to 1-10 defeat of Castlegar. He later won his first Connacht medal following a 9-12 to 1-6 trouncing of Tooreen.

Ardrahan retained their title in 1975, with Bond collecting a second championship medal following a 4-5 to 1-11 defeat of Carnmore. He subsequently added a second Connacht medal to his collection following a 2-14 to 1-4 defeat of Athleague.

After a period of decline, Ardrahan bounced back in 1978. A 2-18 to 2-14 defeat of Ballindereen after a replay and extra time gave Bond a third championship medal. He later won a third Connacht medal following a narrow 2-9 to 1-7 defeat of Tooreen.

=== Inter-county ===
Bond first played for Galway as a member of the minor team in 1965. After two unsuccessful years he progressed onto the under-21 team, however, he enjoyed little success in this grade as well.

In 1968 Bond joined the Galway senior team. He spent seven years on and off the team, however, Galway enjoyed little success during this period. Bond left the panel in 1975.

== Managerial career ==
=== Early years ===
From his early years, Bond had been involved in coaching and training teams at club colleges and inter-county levels. In 1983, he was trainer of the Galway under-21 team that defeated Tipperary by 0-12 to 1-6 to take the All-Ireland title.

After declining an invitation to train the Galway senior team at the end of 1983, Bond took charge of the junior side in 1984.

In 1988, he took over as trainer of the Galway minor team.

=== Offaly manager ===
Bond was appointed manager of the Offaly senior team in July 1998 following the resignation of "Babs" Keating after a 3-10 to 1-11 Leinster final defeat by Kilkenny. When Bond took over it looked as if Offaly's championship hopes were in disarray, however, they overcame Antrim in the All-Ireland quarter-final and qualified to meet Clare in the semi-final. The first game ended in a draw and had to be replayed, however, the replay was ended early because of a time-keeping error by the referee Jimmy Cooney. Following a protest on the pitch of Croke Park by the Offaly supporters, it was decided that Clare and Offaly would meet for a third time. Offaly won the third game and qualified to play Kilkenny in the All-Ireland final. On that day Brian Whelahan delivered one of his greatest-ever Offaly performances, scoring 1-6. Offaly reversed the Leinster final defeat by winning the All-Ireland title by 2-16 to 1-13.

Following Offaly's exit from the 1999 championship at the All-Ireland semi-final stage, Bond stepped down as manager.

After a year out of inter-county management, Bond returned as Offaly manager in November 2000. His second term as manager was less successful, with Offaly falling to Kilkenny in the 2001Leinster semi-final. Following the conclusion of the championship Bond stepped down from the position.

== Honours ==
=== Player ===
Ardrahan

- Connacht Senior Club Hurling Championship (3): 1974, 1975, 1978
- Galway Senior Club Hurling Championship (3): 1974, 1975, 1978

=== Manager ===
Galway

- All-Ireland Under-21 Hurling Championship (1): 1983

Offaly

- All-Ireland Senior Hurling Championship (1): 1998

Achievements
Preceded by Ger Loughnane (Clare)	All-Ireland Senior Hurling Final winning manager 1998	Succeeded by Jimmy Barry-Murphy (Cork)
Sporting positions
Preceded by Michael "Babs" Keating	Offaly Senior Hurling Manager; 1998-1999	Succeeded by Pat Fleury
Preceded by Pat Fleury	Offaly Senior Hurling Manager; 2000-2001	Succeeded by Tom Fogarty
