= Darragh Ryan (hurler) =

Irish hurler

Darragh Ryan is a retired Irish sportsperson. He played hurling with the Wexford senior inter-county team and won an All Star award in 2001, being picked in the right corner back position.
