= Mossie Walsh =

Irish hurler

Mossie Walsh is an Irish retired sportsperson. He played hurling with the Waterford senior inter-county team and won an All Star award in 1980, being picked in midfield.
