= Seán Óg Ó hAilpín =

Fijian-Irish hurler and Gaelic footballer

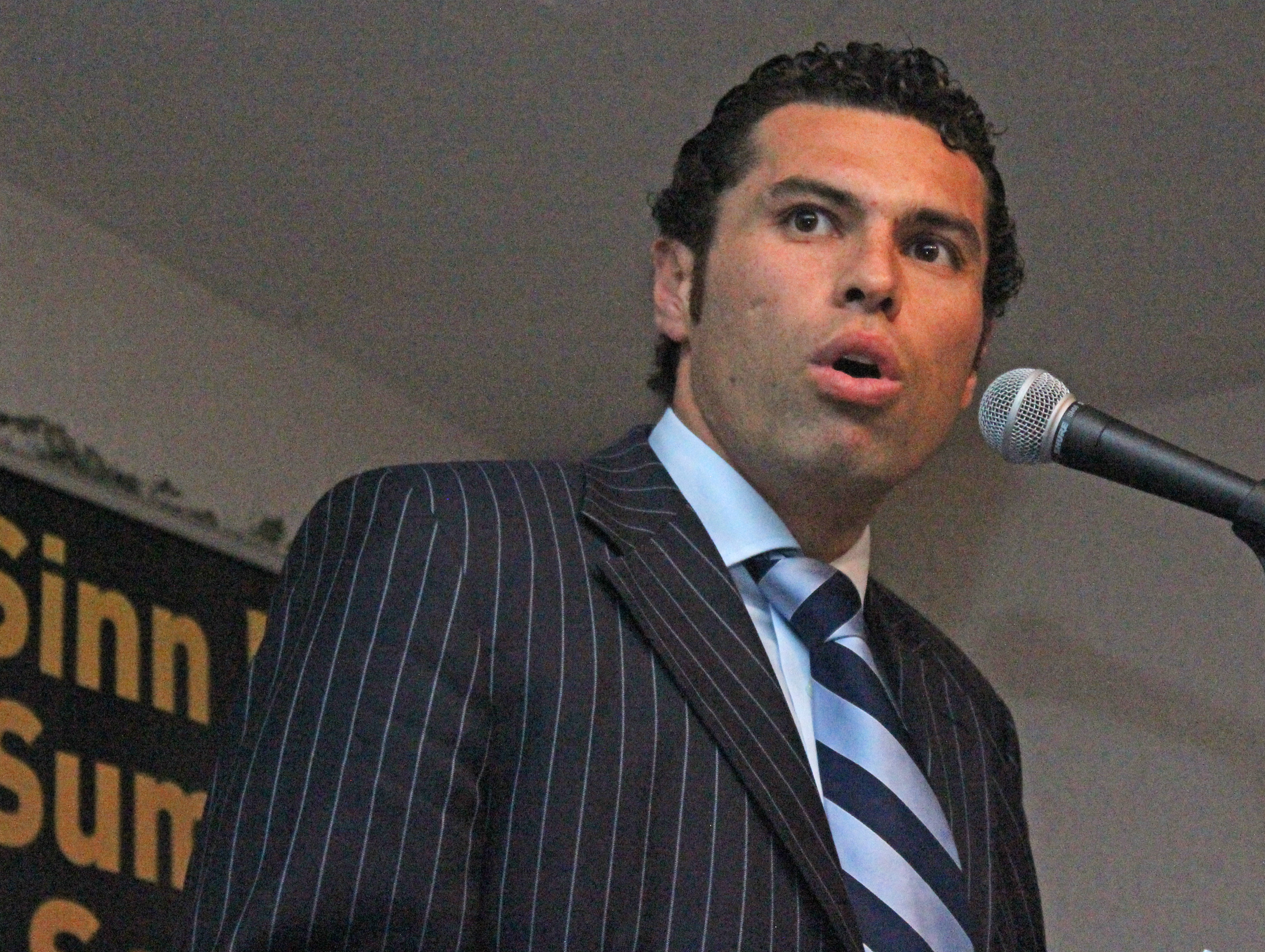

Personal information
- Nickname: Ógie
- Born: 22 May 1977 (age 49) Rotuma, Fiji
- Occupation: Ulster Bank official
- Height: 6 ft 2 in (188 cm)

Sport
- Football Position: Full back
- Hurling Position: Left half back
Club
- Years: Club
- 1994–2014: Na Piarsaigh
Club titles
- Cork titles: 2
Inter-county*
Years	County	Apps (scores)
1996–2012 1999–2001	Cork (H); Cork (F)	55 (0–16); 11 (0–1)
Inter-county titles
	Football	Hurling
Munster Titles	1	5
All-Ireland Titles	0	3
League titles	1	1
All-Stars	0	3
- *Inter County team apps and scores correct as of 21:02, 4 November 2012.

Seán Óg Ó hAilpín (Irish pronunciation: [ˈʃaːn̪ˠ ˌoːɡ oː ˈhalʲpʲiːnʲ]; born 22 May 1977) is a Fijian-Irish hurler and Gaelic footballer.

In an inter-county playing career that spanned three decades, Ó hAilpín played for the Cork senior hurling and football teams, winning major honours with both. He also enjoyed much success with club side Na Piarsaigh and represented Munster in the inter-provincial championships.

After starting his career as a hurler at minor level, Ó hAilpín joined the Cork senior hurling team in 1996. Between then and 2012 he won three All-Ireland medals, five Munster medals and one National Hurling League medal. Ó hAilpín's three-year career with the Cork senior football team saw him win one Munster medal and one National Football League medal.

At club level Ó hAilpín is a two-time county hurling championship medalist with Na Piarsaigh.

Ó hAilpín has a number of personal achievements, including three consecutive All Star awards. In 2004 he made a clean sweep of all the top individual awards, winning the All Star, Texaco and GPA Hurler of the Year awards. Four years later in 2009 he was chosen on the Munster team of the past twenty-five years.

His brothers Setanta, Teu, and Aisake are also notable sportsmen.

In October 2013, Ó hAilpín released his autobiography called Seán Óg Ó hAilpÍn ... The Autobiography.

== Early life and education ==
Ó hAilpín was born on the island of Rotuma, 646 kilometres north of the main Fiji islands to Seán Ó hAilpín, an oil-rig worker and a native of Fermanagh in Northern Ireland, and his wife Emilie, a hotel worker and a Rotuman. The eldest of six children, he was the only Ó hAilpín to be born on his mother's native island.

When Ó hAilpín was three years-old the family emigrated to Sydney in Australia. It was here that he first gained an interest in various sports, particularly rugby league. His years in Australia also saw the birth of Ó hAilpín's siblings – Teu, Sarote, Setanta and Aisake. Both Setanta and Aisake would later play for the Carlton Football Club in the Australian Football League. Teu subsequently played both hurling and football in Ireland and Britain.

The Ó hAilpín family moved from Australia to Ireland in 1988 and settled in Cork. They rented a house in Knocknaheeny before moving permanently to Blarney, just a short few miles outside the city. Ó hAilpín adapted well to life in his new surroundings and openly accepted all aspects of Irish culture. He was educated locally in the Gaelcholáiste section of the famous North Monastery secondary school. Here, all of Ó hAilpín's classes were taught in Irish, a language that was alien to him, however, he quickly became fluent. It was in the "North Mon" that he was also first introduced to Gaelic games, and he quickly became a key component of the school's senior hurling team.

Ó hAilpín subsequently attended Dublin City University. In 1999 he was conferred with a BSc in Finance Computing and Entrepreneurship (Airgeadas, Ríomhaireacht agus Fiontraíocht).

== Playing career ==
=== Colleges ===
Ó hAilpín first enjoyed hurling success as a member of the North Monastery senior hurling team. He won a provincial Dr. Harty Cup medal in 1994, before later lining out in the All-Ireland colleges' final. St. Mary's school from Galway provided the opposition, however, victory went to the Cork school. The 1–10 to 1–6 score line resulted in Ó hAilpín picking up an All-Ireland medal.

=== Club ===
While Ó hAilpín first came into contact with Gaelic games during his secondary schooling, he also linked up with the Na Piarsaigh club on the north side of Cork city. Here he played both hurling and Gaelic football and experienced much success. In 1995 Ó hAilpín won a championship medal at minor level as the club triumphed in the under-18 grade. He subsequently joined the Na Piarsaigh under-21 team, however, he enjoyed little success in this grade, losing two finals in three seasons.

Ó hAilpín was just out of the minor grade when he joined the club's senior team in 1995. That year he lined out in his first senior county final. Ballyhea were the opponents on that occasion; however, victory went to city-side Na Piarsaigh on a score line of 1–12 to 3–1. It was Ó hAilpín's first senior county championship medal.

It took Na Piarsaigh almost a decade to qualify for their next county final at senior level, as 2004 saw the club take on east Cork stalwarts Cloyne. An intriguing contest ensued and, at the full-time whistle, victory went to Na Piarsaigh on a score line of 0–17 to 0–10. It was Ó hAilpín's second championship medal.

=== Minor and under-21 ===
Ó hAilpín first came to prominence on the inter-county scene as a member of the Cork minor hurling team in 1994. In his first season on the team he won a Munster winners' medal following an emphatic 2–15 to 0–9 trouncing of Waterford. Ó hAilpín later lined out in the All-Ireland final with Galway providing the opposition. Unfortunately for Ó hAilpín victory narrowly went to the team from the west by 2–10 to 1–11.

In 1995 Ó hAilpín was a key member of the Cork minor team again. That year he collected a second consecutive Munster title following a second consecutive trouncing of Waterford. Cork subsequently qualified for the All-Ireland final again, this time with arch-rivals Kilkenny providing the opposition. At the second time of asking Cork triumphed and Ó hAilpín collected an All-Ireland Minor Hurling Championship medal. He was also captain of the minor football team this year but lost out in the Munster final to Tipperary.

By 1996 Ó hAilpín was ineligible for the minor team, however, he was an automatic choice for the Cork under-21 team. In his first season on the panel he won a Munster title following a 3–16 to 2–7 trouncing of Clare in the provincial decider. Cork were later defeated by eventual champions Galway in the All-Ireland semi-final.

In 1997 Ó hAilpín lined out in a second consecutive Munster decider. Arch provincial rivals Tipperary were the opponents on that occasion. After a close game Cork emerged victorious by a single point and Ó hAilpín collected a second Munster under-21 medal. 'The Rebels' later qualified for the All-Ireland final with Galway providing the opposition. After a defeat at the hands of the men from the west the previous year, Cork gained revenge in 1997 with a 3–11 to 0–13 win in the championship decider. It was Ó hAilpín's first All-Ireland medal. The victory was all the more spectacular as it was Cork's one hundredth All-Ireland title across all grades.

In 1998 Ó hAilpín was in his final year on the under-21 team. Once again Cork qualified for the provincial decider and, once again, Tipperary provided the opposition. On this occasion Cork's victory over their old enemy was much more comprehensive and Ó hAilpín added a third consecutive Munster under-21 medal to his collection. The subsequent All-Ireland final saw Cork take on Galway at that stage of the competition for the second year in-a-row. An interesting game developed; however, victory went to Cork by 2–15 to 2–10. It was Ó hAilpín's second and final All-Ireland medal in the under-21 grade.

=== Senior ===
By this stage Ó hAilpín was also a member of the Cork senior hurling team. He made his debut in a Munster championship game against Limerick in 1996. He came on as a substitute for Mark Mullins and assumed the captaincy of the team as the only Na Piarsaigh player on the field of play. Cork were trounced on that occasion by 3–18 to 1–8.

Two years later in 1998 Ó hAilpín first tasted success at senior level. Cork defeated Waterford by 2–14 to 0–13 to take the National Hurling League title. Cork failed to repeat this success in the championship, however, the capturing of the league title was a victory which kick-started Cork's return to the big time.

In 1999 Ó hAilpín became a dual star with Cork, a player of both hurling and Gaelic football at senior level. He began the year by winning a National Football League medal following a 0–12 to 1–7 victory over Dublin.

Later that year the Cork senior hurlers were back in the Munster final for the first time in seven years. Clare, the provincial stars of the last few years, provided the opposition on that occasion and were the firm favourites to secure a fourth title in five years. A Joe Deane goal proved the key for Cork and, at the full-time whistle, 'the Rebels' were the victors by 1–15 to 0–14. It was Ó hAilpín's first Munster medal at senior level. Shortly after this victory Ó hAilpín lined out with the Cork senior footballers in the Munster football decider against arch-rivals Kerry. In atrocious weather conditions Cork emerged victorious by 2–10 to 2–4. It was Ó hAilpín's first Munster football title and acted as a springboard for further success. Back with the hurlers Cork subsequently qualified for the All-Ireland final against Kilkenny. Once again the wet conditions severely hampered what many people expected to be a classic game. Both teams shot seventeen wides over the seventy minutes, however, the Jimmy Barry-Murphy-managed Cork team, with an average age of twenty-two, sealed a 0–13 to 0–12 victory. It was Ó hAilpín's first All-Ireland medal. Two weeks after this victory he lined out for the Cork footballers in the All-Ireland final against Meath. In an exciting game that saw the lead switch hands on several occasions Cork's hopes of doing the double were dashed as Meath won by 1–11 to 1–8.

In 2000 Cork's hurlers were the favourites to retain their All-Ireland title. The team got off to a good start by retaining their Munster title, however, Tipperary put up a good fight in the final but were ultimately defeated by 0–23 to 3–12. Cork's next game was an All-Ireland semi-final meeting with Offaly. While Cork were expected to win the game without breaking a sweat Offaly caught Ó hAilpín's side on the hop and secured a 0–19 to 0–15 win.

A car crash in 2001 almost ended Ó hAilpín's career as his kneecap was severed; however, he overcame this difficulty and fought his way back to fitness in a short period of time.

While the Cork hurling team should have gone from strength to strength as a result of a solid foundation at minor and under-21 levels the opposite happened. Embarrassing defeats in 2001 and 2002 saw the Cork hurling team reach rock bottom and call a players strike just before Christmas in 2002. Ó hAilpín played a huge role as one of the main spokesmen in representing the welfare of his fellow players. Had the strike failed it could have meant the end of his inter-county career, however, in the end the Cork county board relented and met the demands. Although still amateur sportsmen the Cork senior hurling team were treated to all the trappings of professional athletes.

In 2003 Cork's players were vindicated in taking a stand as the team reached the Munster final for the first time in three years. Waterford provided the opposition on that occasion and one of hurling's modern rivalries began in earnest. An exciting game resulted between the two teams; however, victory went to Cork by 3–16 to 3–12. It was Ó hAilpín's third Munster medal. Cork subsequently qualified for an All-Ireland final meeting with Kilkenny. In another thrilling game of hurling both teams were level for much of the game, exchanging tit-for-tat scores. A Martin Comerford goal five minutes from the end settled the game as Kilkenny went on to win by 1–14 to 1–11. In spite of losing that day Seán Óg and his brother Setanta were both subsequently honoured with All-Star awards.

2004 saw Cork reach the Munster final once again and, for the second consecutive year, Waterford provided the opposition. In what many consider to be the greatest provincial championship decider of them all, both sides fought tooth-and-nail for the full seventy minutes. Unfortunately for Ó hAilpín Cork lost the game by just a single point on a score line of 3–16 to 1–21. Although Cork surrendered their provincial crown they were still in with a chance of landing the All-Ireland title. After maneuvering through the qualifiers Cork reached a second consecutive All-Ireland final and, once again, Kilkenny provided the opposition. This game took on a life of its own for a number of reasons. Chief among these was that Kilkenny were attempting to capture a third All-Ireland in-a-row and go one ahead of Cork in the All-Ireland roll of honour. The game was expected to be another classic; however, a damp day put an end to this. The first half was a low-scoring affair and provided little excitement for fans. The second-half saw Cork completely take over. For the last twenty-three minutes Cork scored nine unanswered points and went on to win the game by 0–17 to 0–9. It was Ó hAilpín's second All-Ireland medal and a second consecutive All-Star soon followed.

In 2005 Cork were on form again while Ó hAilpín was honoured by being appointed captain of the team. That year Cork won back the provincial crown with a 1–21 to 1–16 victory over fierce provincial rivals Tipperary. It was Ó hAilpín's fourth Munster medal as Cork went on the march for glory once again. While it was expected that Cork and Kilkenny would do battle again in a third consecutive All-Ireland final Galway were the surprise winners of the second semi-final. It was the first meeting of Cork and Galway in an All-Ireland final since 1990 and even more daunting was that men from the west had never beaten Cork in a championship decider. Once again neither side broke away into a considerable lead, however, Galway failed to score for the last ten minutes and at the final whistle Cork were ahead by 1–21 to 1–16. For the second year in-a-row Cork were the All-Ireland champions and Ó hAilpín had the great honour of collecting the Liam MacCarthy Cup. Despite being born in Fiji, Ó hAilpín is a fluent speaker of the Irish Language and was lauded for his acceptance speech following the final as it was delivered exclusively in Irish. A third consecutive All-Star award soon followed. Following the conclusion of the championship Seán Óg joined his brother, Setanta, a former hurler and currently a player in the Australian Football League with Carlton, for some off-season training. It was thought that he may join his brother at the Australian club, however, unlike his younger brother; his age was a factor against this.

2006 saw Cork turn their attentions to a first three-in-a-row of All-Ireland titles since 1978. The provincial decider saw Cork take on Tipperary for the second consecutive year. Once again Cork's stalwarts stood up and contributed greatly to Cork's 2–11 to 1–11 victory over their old rivals. Subsequent one-point victories over Limerick and Waterford saw Cork qualify for their fourth consecutive All-Ireland final and for the third time Kilkenny were the opponents. Like previous encounters neither side took a considerable lead, however, Kilkenny had a vital goal from Aidan Fogarty. Cork were in arrears coming into the final few minutes, however, Ben O'Connor scored a goal for Cork. It was too little too late as 'the Cats' denied 'the Rebels' the three-in-a-row on a score line of 1–16 to 1–13.

In 2007 Ó hAilpín's side were set out to atone for their All-Ireland defeat the previous year, however, Cork's championship ambitions were hampered from the beginning. Although defeating Clare in the opening round the so-called Semplegate affair resulted in Ó hAilpín, goalkeeper Donal Óg Cusack and full-back Diarmuid O'Sullivan being suspended for a crucial Munster semi-final clash with Waterford. Cork exited the championship after an All-Ireland quarter-final replay defeat by Waterford.

On 18 October 2010 O hAilpín announced that he had met with senior hurling manager Denis Walsh over the previous weekend and that he had informed him that he was not in his plans for the Cork hurling panel. In a statement released by the Gaelic Players’ Association he said “I would love to continue to play for Cork, but I must respect the manager's decision in this regard".

One year later it was announced on the Cork GAA website that Ó hAilpín would be included in the training squad for the 2012 hurling season. Cork's championship season ended at the All-Ireland semi-final stage with a defeat by Galway.

On 2 November 2012 Ó hAilpín announced his retirement from inter-county hurling.

=== Inter-provincial ===
Ó hAilpín also experienced success as a dual player with the Munster inter-provincial teams.

He first lined out for his province in 1999. While the Munster hurlers were defeated Ó hAilpín won a Railway Cup medal as the Munster footballers defeated Connacht by 0–10 to 0–7.

It was 2007 before he finally collected a Railway Cup hurling medal after Munster defeated Connacht by three points in controversial circumstances.

=== International ===
In 2004 Ó hAilpín received his first call up to the Irish International Rules squad. Ó hAilpín started both tests getting on the score sheet with a behind in the first test as Ireland ran out series winners. In 2005 Ó hAilpín was again selected as part of the squad to travel to Australia. He was selected to play in both tests as Ireland were defeated.

In 2008 Ó hAilpín was selected for Ireland against Scotland in the Hurling/Shinty Compromise International Rules. He is the first man to be selected for both the Irish International Rules and Hurling-Shinty International Rules teams.

== Personal life ==
In November 2017, The Irish Times reported that Fianna Fáil was thinking of Ó hAilpín, an employee of Ulster Bank, as a potential election candidate.

== Honours ==
=== Team ===
North Monastery

- Dr Croke Cup (1): 1994
- Dr Harty Cup (1): 1994

Na Piarsaigh

- Cork Senior Club Hurling Championship (2): 1995, 2004
- Cork Minor Club Hurling Championship (1): 1995
- Cork Minor Club Football Championship (1): 1995

Cork

- All-Ireland Senior Hurling Championship (3): 1999, 2004, 2005 (c)
- Munster Senior Hurling Championship (5): 1999, 2000, 2003, 2005 (c), 2006
- Munster Senior Football Championship (1): 1999
- National Hurling League (1): 1998
- National Football League (1): 1999
- All-Ireland Under-21 Hurling Championship (2): 1997, 1998
- Munster Under-21 Hurling Championship (3): 1996, 1997, 1998
- All-Ireland Minor Hurling Championship (1): 1995
- Munster Minor Hurling Championship (2): 1994, 1995

Munster

- Railway Cup (football) (1): 1999
- Railway Cup (hurling) (1): 2007

Ireland

- International Rules (1): 2004

=== Individual ===
- Munster Hurling Team of the Last 25 Years (1984–2009)
- GPA Hurler of the Year (1): 2004
- All Stars Hurler of the Year (1): 2004
- Texaco Hurler of the Year (1): 2004
- RTÉ Sports Person of the Year (1): 2004
- All Stars (3): 2003, 2004, 2005

Awards
Preceded by J. J. Delaney (Kilkenny)	Vodafone Hurler of the Year; 2004	Succeeded by Jerry O'Connor (Cork)
Preceded by J. J. Delaney (Kilkenny)	Gaelic Players' Association; Hurler of the Year; 2004	Succeeded by John Gardiner (Cork)
Preceded by J. J. Delaney (Kilkenny)	Texaco Hurler of the Year; 2004	Succeeded by Jerry O'Connor (Cork)
Sporting positions
Preceded by Ben O'Connor	Cork Senior Hurling Captain; 2005	Succeeded by Pat Mulcahy
Achievements
Preceded by Ben O'Connor (Cork)	All-Ireland SHC winning captain 2005	Succeeded by Jackie Tyrrell (Kilkenny)
