= Pat McLoughney (Offaly hurler) =

Irish hurler and selector (1949–2018)

Personal information
- Native name: Pádraig Ó Maolachtna (Irish)
- Born: 1949 Coolderry, County Offaly, Ireland
- Died: 30 January 2018 (aged 68) Birr, County Offaly, Ireland

Sport
- Sport: Hurling
- Position: Midfield
Club
- Years: Club
- Coolderry
Club titles
- Offaly titles: 3
Inter-county*
Years	County	Apps (scores)
1971–1980	Offaly	17
Inter-county titles
- Leinster titles: 1
- All-Irelands: 0
- NHL: 0
- All Stars: 0
- *Inter County team apps and scores correct as of 17:24, 31 January 2018.

Pat McLoughney (1949 – 30 January 2018) was an Irish hurling selector and player. His league and championship career with the Offaly senior team lasted eleven seasons from 1971 until 1980.

Born in Coolderry, County Offaly, McLoughney first played competitive hurling at juvenile and underage levels with the Coolderry club. He eventually became a key member of the club's senior team, winning three county senior championship medals.

McLoughney made his debut with the Offaly senior team during the 1970-71 league. Over the course of the following ten years he was a regular member of the team and won a Leinster medal in 1980. McLoughney played his last game for Offaly in November 1980.

In retirement from playing McLoughney became involved in team management and coaching. As a selector with the Offaly senior team at various times between 1992 and 2011, he helped guide the team to All-Ireland titles in 1994 and 1998. McLoughney was also a selector with the Coolderry championship-winning team in 2015.

== Honours ==
=== Player ===
Coolderry

- Offaly Senior Hurling Championship (3): 1977, 1980, 1986

Offaly

- Leinster Senior Hurling Championship (1): 1980

=== Selector ===
Coolderry

- Offaly Senior Hurling Championship (1): 2015

Offaly

- All-Ireland Senior Hurling Championship: 1994, 1998
- Leinster Senior Hurling Championship (2): 1994, 1995
