= 1998 All-Ireland Senior Hurling Championship =

Championship details
- Dates: 24 May - 13 September 1998
- Teams: 18

All-Ireland champions
- Winning team: Offaly (4th win)
- Captain: Hubert Rigney
- Manager: Michael Bond

All-Ireland Finalists
- Losing team: Kilkenny
- Captain: Tom Hickey
- Manager: Kevin Fennelly

Provincial champions
- Munster: Clare
- Leinster: Kilkenny
- Ulster: Antrim
- Connacht: Galway

Championship statistics
- No. matches played: 23
- Top Scorer: John Troy (2–31)
- Player of the Year: Tony Browne; Brian Whelahan
- All-Star Team: See here

The All-Ireland Senior Hurling Championship of 1998 (known for sponsorship reasons as the Guinness Hurling Championship 1998) was the 112th staging of Ireland's premier hurling competition. Offaly won the championship, beating Kilkenny 2–16 to 1–13 in the final at Croke Park, Dublin.

== Team changes ==
=== To Championship ===
Promoted from the All-Ireland Intermediate Hurling Championship

- London

=== From Championship ===
Regraded to the All-Ireland Intermediate Hurling Championship

- Westmeath

== Format ==
1998 was the second year that the controversial "back door" or qualifier system was used in the All-Ireland Championship. While the two provincial final winners automatically qualify for the All-Ireland semi-finals the two defeated provincial teams join Galway and the Ulster provincial final winners in two "quarter-finals". The two winners from these two games qualify for the semi-finals where they meet the Leinster and Munster winners. In 1998 Waterford and Offaly were the two teams to benefit from the qualifier system.

== Semi-final controversy ==
The All-Ireland semi-final replay between Clare and Offaly ended in controversy when the referee, Jimmy Cooney, mistakenly ended the game five minutes earlier than he had intended. At the time of the early stoppage, the score was 1–16 to 2–10 in favour of Clare. When the whistle blew there was disarray in Croke Park as the disgruntled Offaly supporters began a sit-down protest on the pitch. A Kildare v. Kerry IHC game planned for afterwards had to be cancelled.

Clare graciously agreed to have the game replayed. In the re-fixture in Thurles 6 days later, the result was reversed with Offaly winning the game on a score of 0–16 to 0–13.

== All-Ireland final ==
As a result of the new qualifier system of games for the second year in a row, the All-Ireland final was contested by two teams from the same province. However, this year the final was a repeat of the Leinster final with Offaly taking on Kilkenny. Offaly were playing in their Third All-Ireland Final of the 1990s (having won against Limerick in 1994 and lost to Clare in 1995). Goals for Offaly reversed the Leinster final result and allowed the Offaly men to defeat "the Cats" heavily.

== Provincial championships ==
=== Connacht Senior Hurling Championship ===
July 12
Final

Roscommon	3–13 – 2–27	Galway
B. Boyle (1–5), C. Kelly (1–4), P. Regan (1–1), M. Cunniffe (0–1), L. Murray (0–1), T. Galvin (0–1).		D. Coen (1–13), A. Kerins (1–4), M. Kenny (0–2), F. Forde (0–2), M. Coleman (0–1), O. Fahy (0–1), K. Broderick (0–1), J. Rabbitte (0–1), J. McGrath (0–1), N. Shaughnessy (0–1).

Dr. Hyde Park, Roscommon
Attendance: 2,000
Referee: P. Delaney (Laois)

=== Leinster Senior Hurling Championship ===
Quarter-Finals
Offaly	4–28
Meath	0–08
Dublin	0–14
Kilkenny	4–23

Semi-Finals
Offaly	1–15
Wexford	0–17
Kilkenny	3–11
Laois	1–14

Final
Kilkenny	3–10
Offaly	1–11

May 24
Quarter-Final

Offaly	4–28 – 0–8	Meath
J. Troy (1–9), Joe Dooley (1–5), M. Duignan (0–4), B. Dooley (1–1), B. Whelehan (1–0), M. Hand (0–3), K. Farrell (0–2), C. Cassidy (0–1), P. Mulhaire (0–1), G. Oakley (0–1), J. Pilkington (0–1).		N. Horan (0–6), M. Cole (0–1), D. Dorran (0–1).

Croke Park, Dublin
Attendance: 48,856
Referee: P. Aherne (Carlow)

May 31
Quarter-Final

Dublin	0–14 – 4–23	Kilkenny
J. Brennan (0–5), E. Morrissey (0–3), I. McGrane (0–2), S. Perkins (0–2), D. Sweeney (0–1), R. Boland (0–1).		D. J. Carey (1–8), N. Maloney (1–3), B. McEvoy (1–1), K. O'Shea (1–0), M. Phelan (0–3), C. Carter (0–3), P. J. Delaney (0–3), P. O'Neill (0–1), P. Larkin (0–1).

Parnell Park, Dublin
Attendance: 10,000
Referee: D. Murphy (Wexford)

June 14
Semi-Final

Kilkenny	3–11 – 1–14	Laois
K. O'Shea (1–1), C. Carter (0–4), N. Maloney (1–0), P. J. Delaney (1–0), D. J. Carey (0–3), P. O'Neill (0–2), D. Byrne (0–1).		D. Cuddy (0–5), M. Rooney (1–1), C. Cuddy (0–2), D. Rooney (0–2), D. Russell (0–1), O. Dowling (0–1), F. O'Sullivan (0–1), P. Cuddy (0–1).

Croke Park, Dublin
Attendance: 46,078
Referee: P. Horan (Offaly)

June 14
Semi-Final

Offaly	1–15 – 0–17	Wexford
Johnny Dooley (1–3), J. Troy (0–4), B. Whelehan (0–3), Joe Dooley (0–2), B. Dooley (0–1), J. Pilkington (0–1), P. Mulhaire (0–1).		P. Codd (0–9), M. Storey (0–3), A. Fenlon (0–2), R. McCarthy (0–1), L. Murphy (0–1), M. Jordan (0–1).

Croke Park, Dublin
Attendance: 46,078
Referee: A. Mac Suibhne (Dublin)

July 5
Final

Kilkenny	3–10 – 1–11	Offaly
C. Carter (1–5), D. J. Carey (2–1), N. Maloney (0–1), B. McEvoy (0–1), A. Comerford (0–1), M. Phelna (0–1).		J. Troy (1–6), Johnny Dooley (0–2), D. Hanniffy (0–1), K. Martin (0–1), B. Whelehan (0–1).

Croke Park, Dublin
Attendance: 32,490
Referee: D. Murphy (Wexford)

=== Munster Senior Hurling Championship ===
Quarter-Finals
Kerry	1–09
Waterford	1–20
Limerick	3–11
Cork	1–20

Semi-Finals
Waterford	0–21
Tipperary	2–12
Clare	0–21
Cork	0–13

Final
Clare	1–16, 2–16
Waterford	3–10, 0–10

May 24
Quarter-Final

Kerry	1–9 – 0–20	Waterford
B. O'Sullivan (0–4), J. M. Dooley (1–0), R. Gentleman (0–2), M. Slattery (0–2), T. Maunsell (0–1).		D. Shanahan (0–6), P. Flynn (0–6), K. McGrath (0–3), T. Browne (0–2), A. Kirwan (0–1), D. Bennett (0–1), M. White (0–1).

Austin Stack Park, Tralee
Attendance: 4,106
Referee: S. McMahon (Clare)

May 31
Quarter-Final

Limerick	3–11 – 1–20	Cork
B. Foley (1–1), S. O'Neill (1–1), M. Galligan (0–4), J. Moran (1–0), G. Kirby (0–2), T. J. Ryan (0–2), M. Foley (0–1).		J. Deane (0–7), S. McGrath (0–5), A. Browne (1–1), S. O'Farrell (0–3), K. Morrisson (0–2), F. McCormack (0–2).

Gaelic Grounds, Limerick
Attendance: 34,480
Referee: J. McDonnell (Tipperary)

June 7
Semi-Final

Waterford	0–21 – 2–12	Tipperary
P. Flynn (0–10), K. McGrath (0–4), T. Browne (0–2), D. Shanahan (0–2), B. O'Sullivan (0–2), A. Kirwan (0–1).	Report	E. O'Neill (1–3), B. O'Meara (1–0), L. Cahill (0–3), T. Dunne (0–2), L. McGrath (0–1), D. Ryan (0–1), J. Leahy (0–1), M. Kennedy (0–1).

Páirc Uí Chaoimh, Cork
Attendance: 30,532
Referee: P. O'Connor (Limerick)

June 21
Semi-Final

Clare	0–21 – 0–13	Cork
J. O'Connor (0–5), E. Taaffe (0–3), A. Markham (0–3), N. Gilligan (0–3), D. Forde (0–2), O. Baker (0–2), A. Daly (0–1), G. O'Loughlin (0–1), P. J. O'Connell (0–1).		J. Deane (0–7), P. Ryan (0–3), S. McGrath (0–2), F. McCormack (0–1).

Semple Stadium, Thurles
Attendance: 49,133
Referee: W. Barrett (Tipperary)

July 12
Final

Clare	1–16 – 3–10	Waterford
J. O'Connor (0–7), A. Markham (1–0), P. J. O'Connell (0–2), E. Taaffe (0–2), A. Daly (0–1), O. Baker (0–1), D. Forde (0–1), N. Gilligan (0–1), C. Clancy (0–1).	(Report)	A. Kirwan (2–1), P. Flynn (1–2), T. Browne (0–3), D. Shanahan (0–3), M. White (0–1).

Semple Stadium, Thurles
Attendance: 51,417
Referee: W. Barrett (Tipperary)

July 19
Final Replay

Clare	2–16 – 0–10	Waterford
N. Gilligan (1–1), S. McMahon (0–4), J. O'Connor (0–4), C. Clancy (1–0), D. Forde (0–2), A. Markham (0–1), F. Hegarty (0–1), G. O'Loughlin (0–1), C. Lynch (0–1), O. Baker (0–1).	(Report)	P. Flynn (0–4), D. Bennett (0–2), K. McGrath (0–1), A. Kirwan (0–1), S. Daly (0–1), P. Queally (0–1).

Semple Stadium, Thurles
Attendance: 51,731
Referee: W. Barrett (Tipperary)

=== Ulster Senior Hurling Championship ===
Semi-Finals
Antrim	0-19, 6-28
London	0-19, 1-07
Derry	2-17
Down	0-18

Final
Antrim	1-19
Derry	2-13

June 14
Semi-Final

Antrim	0-19 – 0–19	London
Greg O'Kane (0–6), L. Richmond (0–2), P. McKillen (0–2), S. McMullan (0–2), J. Cardon (0–2), J. McIntosh (0–2), M. Molloy (0–1), Gary O'Kane (0–1), A. Elliott (0–1).		T. Moloney (0–10), D. Browne (0–2), D. Murphy (0–2), E. Quiane (0–2), A. Heney (0–2), C. Heney (0–1).

Casement Park, Belfast
Referee: P. Delaney (Laois)

June 21
Semi-Final Replay

Antrim	6–28 – 1–7	London
J. Carson (2–2), L. Richmond (1–5), A. Elliott (1–5), Greg O'Kane (1–5), P. McKillen (0–4), J. O'Neill (1–0), S. McMullan (0–2), M. Molloy (0–2), C. McGuckian (0–1), C. McKiernan (0–1), J. McIntosh (0–1).		T. Maloney (1–3), P. Jordan (0–2), B. Dolan (0–1), D. Murphy (0–1).

Casement Park, Belfast
Attendance: 3,000
Referee: P. Delaney (Laois)

June 21
Semi-Final

Derry	2–17 – 0–18	Down
O. Collins (0–12), G. McGonagle (1–3), M. Conway (1–0), G. Biggs (0–1), J. O'Dwyer (0–1).		J. McGrattan (0–7), J. McCarthy (0–3), E. Trainor (0–2), G. McGrattan (0–2), M. Coulter (0–2), A. Tinnelly (0–1), B. Coulter (0–1).

Casement Park, Belfast
Attendance: 3,000
Referee: T. McIntyre (Antrim)

July 5
Final

Antrim	1–19 – 2–13	Derry
Greg O'Kane (0–10), A. Elliott (1–3), S. McMullan (0–2), P. McKillen (0–1), J. McIntosh (0–1), Jarlath Elliott (0–1), J. Carson (0–1).		O. Collins (0–10), Gary Biggs (1–1), G. McGonagle (1–0), M. McCormack (0–1), Greg Biggs (0–1).

Casement Park, Belfast
Attendance: 6,000
Referee: P. Delaney (Laois)

== All-Ireland Senior Hurling Championship ==
Bracket

Quarter-Finals
2M	Waterford	1–20
1C	Galway	1–10
2L	Offaly	2–18
1U	Antrim	2–09

Semi-Finals
1L	Kilkenny	1–11
2M	Waterford	1–10
2L	Offaly	0–16
1M	Clare	0–13

Final
1L	Kilkenny	1–13
2L	Offaly	2–16

July 26
Quarter-Final

Waterford	1–20 – 1–10	Galway
T. Browne (0–7), P. Flynn (0–5), S. Daly (1–0), K. McGrath (0–2), A. Kirwan (0–2), D. Bennett (0–1), Billy O'Sullivan (0–1), P. Queally (0–1), D. Shanahan (0–1).		L. Burke (1–1), D. Coen (0–3), F. Forde (0–2), J. Rabbitte (0–1), O. Fahy (0–1), K. Broderick (0–1), A. Kerins (0–1).

Croke Park, Dublin
Attendance: 26,052
Referee: D. Murphy (Wexford)

July 26
Quarter-Final

Offaly	2–18 – 2–9	Antrim
Joe Dooley (0–4), B. Whelehan (0–4), K. Farrell (1–0), M. Duignan (1–0), J. Troy (0–3), J. Ryan (0–3), B. Dooley (0–2), C. Cassidy (0–1), G. Hanniffy (0–1).		G. O'Kane (0–6), J. Carson (1–0), A. Elliott (1–0), J. McIntosh (0–1), J. P. McKillop (0–1), J. Elliott (0–1).

Croke Park, Dublin
Attendance: 26,052
Referee: J. McDonnell (Tipperary)

August 9
Semi-Final

Offaly	1–13 – 1–13	Clare
J. Pilkington (1–1), B. Whelehan (0–4), J. Troy (0–2), Johnny Dooley (0–2), P. Mulhaire (0–2), M. Duignan (0–1), Joe Dooley (0–1).		J. O'Connor (0–6), F. Tuohy (1–2), S. McMahon (0–1), O. Baker (0–1), P. J. O'Connell (0–1), G. O'Loughlin (0–1), D. Forde (0–1).

Croke Park, Dublin
Attendance: 37,124
Referee: J. Cooney (Galway)

August 16
Semi-Final

Kilkenny	1–11 – 1–10	Waterford
D. J. Carey (0–5), N. Maloney (1–0), A. Comerford (0–3), B. McEvoy (0–2), C. Carter (0–1).		T. Browne (1–3), P. Flynn (0–3), D. Shanahan (0–2), B. Daly (0–1), A. Kirwan (0–1).

Croke Park, Dublin
Attendance: 50,856
Referee: P. O'Connor (Limerick)

August 22
Semi-Final Replay

Offaly	2–10 – 1–16	Clare
B. Dooley (1–1), J. Errity (1–0), J. Troy (0–3), Joe dooley (0–2), J. Pilkington (0–1), B. Whelehan (0–1), Johnny Dooley (0–1), M. Duignan (0–1).	Report	A. Markham (1–3), J. O'Connor (0–5), S. McMahon (0–3), B. Murphy (0–2), A. Daly (0–1), F. Tuohy (0–1), O. Baker (0–1).

Croke Park, Dublin
Attendance: 38,015
Referee: J. Cooney (Galway)

August 29
Semi-Final Refixture

Offaly	0–16 – 0–13	Clare
Joe Dooley (0–5), G. Hanniffy (0–3), B. Whelehan (0–3), B. Dooley (0–1), J. Pilkington (0–1), Johnny Dooley (0–1), J. Errity (0–1), J. Troy (0–1).	Report	J. O'Connor (0–5), D. Forde (0–2), A. Daly (0–1), O. Baker (0–1), A. Markham (0–1), S. McMahon (0–1), N. Gilligan (0–1), J. Reddan (0–1).

Semple Stadium, Thurles
Attendance: 45,092
Referee: D. Murphy (Wexford)

September 13
Final

Offaly	2–16 – 1–13	Kilkenny
B. Whelehan (1–6), J. Errity (1–2), J. Troy (0–3), M. Duignan (0–2), Joe Dooley (0–2), J. Pilkington (0–1).		D. J. Carey (0–5), C. Carter (1–1), B. McEvoy (0–3), K. O'Shea (0–2), A. Comerford (0–1), P. Larkin (0–1).

Croke Park, Dublin
Attendance: 65,491
Referee: D. Murphy (Wexford)

Offaly	Kilkenny

== Championship statistics ==
=== Top scorers ===
==== Season ====
Rank	Player	County	Tally	Total	Matches	Average
1	John Troy	Offaly	2–31	37	8	4.62
2	Paul Flynn	Waterford	1–30	33	6	5.50
3	Jamesie O'Connor	Clare	0–32	32	5	6.40
4	D. J. Carey	Kilkenny	3–22	31	5	6.20
5	Greg O'Kane	Antrim	1–27	30	4	7.50
6	Brian Whelehan	Offaly	2–22	28	8	3.50
7	Joe Dooley	Offaly	1–21	24	8	3.00
8	Ollie Collins	Derry	0–22	22	2	11.00
9	Charlie Carter	Kilkenny	2–14	20	5	4.00
10	Tony Browne	Waterford	1–17	20	6	3.33

==== Single game ====
Rank	Player	County	Tally	Total	Opposition
1	Daragh Coen	Galway	1–13	16	Roscommon
2	John Troy	Offaly	1–9	12	Meath
2	Ollie Collins	Derry	0–12	12	Down
4	D. J. Carey	Kilkenny	1–8	11	Dublin
5	Paul Flynn	Waterford	0–10	10	Tipperary
5	Timmy Moloney	London	0–10	10	Antrim
5	Greg O'Kane	Antrim	0–10	10	Derry
5	Ollie Collins	Derry	0–10	10	Antrim
9	Paul Codd	Wexford	0–9	9	Offaly
9	John Troy	Offaly	1–6	9	Kilkenny

== Miscellaneous ==
- Kilkenny v Offaly marked the first ever all Leinster All-Ireland final

== See also ==
- 1998 All-Ireland Intermediate Hurling Championship
