= John Troy (hurler) =

Irish hurler

Personal information
- Native name: Seán Ó Troithigh (Irish)
- Born: 19 January 1971 (age 55) Lusmagh, County Offaly
- Occupation: Electrician
- Height: 5 ft 10 in (178 cm)

Sport
- Sport: Hurling
- Position: Centre-forward
Club
- Years: Club
- Lusmagh
Inter-county
Years	County	Apps (scores)
1989-2001	Offaly	33 (8-56)
Inter-county titles
- Leinster titles: 3
- All-Irelands: 2
- NHL: 1
- All Stars: 1

John Troy (born 19 January 1971) is an Irish retired hurler who played for club side Lusmagh and at inter-county level with the Offaly senior hurling team.

== Career ==
Born in Lusmagh, County Offaly, Troy first came to prominence as goalkeeper with the Offaly minor team that won All-Ireland Minor Championship titles in 1986, 1987 and 1989. He later won back-to-back Leinster Under-21 Championships with the under-21 team, having already joined his brother Jim Troy on the senior team. Troy collected his first silverware with the team in 1990 when Offaly won the Leinster Championship before claiming the National League title the following year. He won a second provincial title in 1994 before ending the season as an All-Ireland Championship-winner after a defeat of Limerick in the final. Troy won a third provincial title the following year before claiming a second All-Ireland winners' medal in 1998. After a defeat to Kilkenny in the 2000 All-Ireland final, Troy lined out for one further season.

== Honours ==
Lusmagh

- Offaly Senior Club Hurling Championship: 1989

Offaly

- All-Ireland Senior Hurling Championship: 1994, 1998
- Leinster Senior Hurling Championship: 1990, 1994, 1995
- National Hurling League: 1990-91
- Leinster Under-21 Hurling Championship: 1991, 1992
- All-Ireland Minor Hurling Championship: 1986, 1987, 1989
- Leinster Minor Hurling Championship: 1986, 1987, 1989

Awards

- All-Stars: 1999
