= Seán Treacy (Galway hurler) =

Irish hurler

Personal information
- Native name: Seán Ó Treasaigh (Irish)
- Born: 1965 (age 60–61) Portumna, County Galway, Ireland
- Occupation: Prison officer
- Height: 6 ft 2 in (188 cm)

Sport
- Sport: Hurling
- Position: Full-back
Club
- Years: Club
- Portumna
Club titles
- Galway titles: 0
Inter-county
- Years: County
- 1985–1996: Galway
Inter-county titles
- Connacht titles: 2
- All-Irelands: 0
- NHL: 2
- All Stars: 2

Seán Treacy (born 1965) is an Irish hurling coach and former player. At club level he played with Portumna, while he also lined out at inter-county level with various Galway teams. Treacy is the current coach of the Clare senior hurling team.

== Playing career ==
Treacy first played hurling at juvenile and underage levels with the Portumna club. He eventually progressed to adult level and was part of the Portumna team that claimed the Galway IHC title in 1992.

Treacy first appeared on the inter-county scene as left corner-back on the minor team that beat Dublin in the 1983 All-Ireland minor final. He later joined the under-21 team and was panel member when Galway won the All-Ireland U21HC title in 1986. By that stage, Treacy had already joined the senior team and was a non-playing substitute when Galway were beaten by Offaly in the 1985 All-Ireland final.

After being dropped from the team for a period, Treacy was recalled and won a National Hurling League title in 1989. His performances that year also earned inclusion on the Connacht team and he won a Railway Cup medal before ending the season with his first All-Star. Treacy was at full-back when Galway suffered All-Ireland final defeats to Cork in 1990 and Kilkenny in 1993. He claimed a second All-Star in 1991.

Treacy was part of the Connacht team that once again claimed the Railway Cup in 1994. He later won consecutive Connacht SHC medals following the reintroduction of that competition. Treacy brought his inter-county career to an end in 1996, having earlier won his second National League medal.

== Coaching career ==
Treacy first became involved in team management and coaching at underage levels with the Portumna club. He was coach of the club's senior team that won the All-Ireland Club SHC title in 2006. Treacy was coach of the Kiladangan team that won the Tipperary SHC title in 2020. He had earlier joined the Clare senior hurling team as coach under manager Brian Lohan.

== Honours ==
=== Player ===
Portumna

- Galway Intermediate Hurling Championship: 1992

Galway

- Connacht Senior Hurling Championship: 1995, 1996
- National Hurling League: 1988–89, 1995–96
- All-Ireland Under-21 Hurling Championship: 1986
- All-Ireland Minor Hurling Championship: 1983

Connacht

- Railway Cup: 1989, 1994

=== Management ===
Portumna

- All-Ireland Senior Club Hurling Championship: 2006
- Connacht Senior Club Hurling Championship: 2005
- Galway Senior Hurling Championship: 2005

Kiladangan

- Tipperary Senior Hurling Championship: 2020
