= Liam Simpson =

Irish hurler

Personal information
- Native name: Liam Mac Shim (Irish)
- Born: 21 June 1966 (age 60) Bennettsbridge, County Kilkenny, Ireland
- Occupation: Tyre fitter
- Height: 6 ft 1 in (185 cm)

Sport
- Sport: Hurling
- Position: Left corner-back
Club
- Years: Club
- Bennettsbridge
Club titles
- Kilkenny titles: 0
Inter-county
- Years: County
- 1990-1996: Kilkenny
Inter-county titles
- Leinster titles: 3
- All-Irelands: 2
- NHL: 1
- All Stars: 2

Liam Gerard Simpson (born 21 June 1966) is an Irish former hurler. At club level he played with Bennettsbridge and was also a member of the Kilkenny senior hurling team. He usually lined out as a corner-back.

== Career ==
Simpson first came to prominence at juvenile and underage levels with the Bennettsbridge club, however, his early sporting life was dominated by soccer. As a centre half of sweeper with his local club East End, he won every honour in the Kilkenny and District League. At imter-county level, Simpson was overlooked for the Kilkenny minor and under-21 teams, however, he won an All-Ireland Junior Championship title in 1990. This success saw him drafted on to the Kilkenny senior hurling team in advance of the 1990-91 league. Simspon was corner-back on the Kilkenny team that won consecutive All-Ireland CHampionship titles in 1992 and 1993. His other honours include a National League title, three consecutive Leinster Championship medals and two consecutive All-Star Awards.

== Honours ==
=== Team ===
Kilkenny

- All-Ireland Senior Hurling Championship: 1992, 1993
- Leinster Senior Hurling Championship: 1991, 1992, 1993
- National Hurling League: 1994-95
- All-Ireland Junior Hurling Championship: 1990
- Leinster Junior Hurling Championship: 1990

=== Individual ===
Awards

- All-Star Award: 1992, 1993
