= John McMahon (hurler) =

Clare hurler

Personal information
- Native name: Seán Mac Mathúna (Irish)
- Born: 1949 (age 76–77) Newmarket-on-Fergus, County Clare, Ireland

Sport
- Sport: Hurling
- Position: Left corner-back
Club
- Years: Club
- 1960s–1980s: Newmarket-on-Fergus
Club titles
- Clare titles: 9
- Munster titles: 1
Inter-county
- Years: County
- 1970s–1980s: Clare
Inter-county titles
- Munster titles: 0
- All-Irelands: 0
- NHL: 2
- All Stars: 2

John McMahon (born 1949) is an Irish former hurler who played as a left corner-back for the Clare senior team.

McMahon first joined the Clare team in the early 1970s and was a regular member of the starting fifteen over the course of the next decade. During that time he won two National Hurling League winners' medals and two All-Star awards; however, he missed out on a Munster SHC winners' medal on a number of occasions.

At club level McMahon played for Newmarket-on-Fergus, winning two Munster Club SHC winner's medal and nine county club championship winners' medals.
