= Setanta Ó hAilpín =

Fijian-Irish sportsman (born 1983)

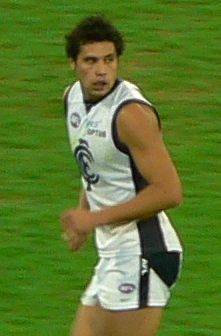

Personal information
- Full name: Setanta Ó hAilpín
- Nickname: Carlos
- Born: 18 March 1983 (age 43); Sydney, New South Wales
- Original team: Na Piarsaigh (club)/Cork (hurling, county team)
- Draft: 2011 National Draft: No. 79 (Greater Western Sydney)
- Height: 199 cm (6 ft 6 in)
- Weight: 103 kg (227 lb)
- Positions: Forward, ruckman

Playing career^{1}
Years	Club	Games (Goals)
2005–2011	Carlton	80 (67)
2012–2013	Greater Western Sydney	8 (15)
Total		88 (82)

International team honours
Years	Team	Games (Goals)
2004	Ireland	2
- ^{1} Playing statistics correct to the end of 2013.

Setanta Ó hAilpín (born 18 March 1983) is a Fijian-Irish sportsman. He played hurling at senior level for the Cork county team before becoming a professional Australian rules footballer. Ó hAilpín is of mixed Irish and Rotuman background. His brothers Seán Óg, Teu and Aisake are also noted sportsmen.

== Early life and Gaelic games ==
Ó hAilpín was born in Australia to an Irish father and a mother from the Fijian dependency of Rotuma. The family moved to Cork in Ireland in 1988 and Ó hAilpín played both hurling and Gaelic football for Na Piarsaigh, eventually concentrating on hurling. In 2000, he was selected for the Cork minor team. He studied at Waterford Institute of Technology and starred on its Fitzgibbon Cup-winning side in March 2003.

Ó hAilpín joined his elder brother, Seán Óg, on the Cork county team for the 2003 All-Ireland Senior Hurling Championship, with the team losing the final to Kilkenny that September. His contribution to the campaign earned him an All-Star award and the Young Hurler of the Year award.

In December 2003, Ó hAilpín announced his move to Australia to play Australian rules football for the Carlton Football Club in Melbourne. This was considered surprising, as AFL recruiters in Ireland primarily targeted Gaelic footballers and Ó hAilpín had concentrated on hurling. Younger brother Aisake followed Setanta to Carlton, while elder brother Seán Óg continued with the Cork hurlers.

Ó hAilpín returned to Ireland in 2004 to play for the Irish team against Australia in the 2004 International Rules Series. During his trip, he also turned out alongside his brothers for Na Piarsaigh as they won the Cork Senior Hurling Championship.

== AFL career ==
=== Carlton ===
Originally placed on the rookie list, strong performances for Carlton's VFL-affiliate, the Northern Bullants, saw Ó hAilpín elevated to the primary list in place of Anthony Franchina during 2004; however, injury stunted his progress during that season. He made his AFL debut during 2005, but had limited game time, scoring a goal with his only kick – a set shot at the very end of the game.

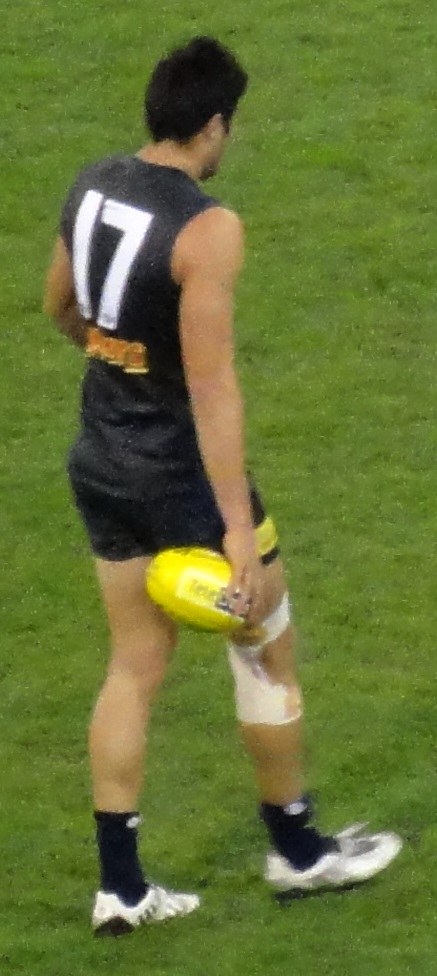
Ó hAilpín in 2011

Ó hAilpín was placed on Carlton's senior list in 2006. After playing largely in the forward line for the first years of his development, he was shifted to half-back in early 2006. He gained regular senior selection late in the season, going on to play in the final ten games of the season.

Ó hAilpín began the 2007 season playing at full-back, playing the first six games there. An injury to Cameron Cloke then saw Ó hAilpín replacing him as a back-up ruckman. He was also rotated forward from the ruck position, making him versatile. In June 2007, he exchanged punches with teammate Cain Ackland in a training match. The event drew some media attention, however the club at the time brushed the incident off.

Ó hAilpín became a crowd favourite among Carlton fans. His nickname, "Carlos", is derived from the similarity between "Setanta" and "Santana", the surname of the Mexican-American guitarist Carlos Santana. "Setanta" was the birth-name of Cúchulainn, hero of the Ulster Cycle of Irish mythology.

On 6 February 2009, Ó hAilpín was suspended indefinitely by the Carlton Football Club for his involvement in a violent altercation with teammate Cameron Cloke in an internal trial match. His actions were scrutinised by the AFL's match review panel on 9 February and he faced being forced into anger management counselling. On 9 February 2009, Ó hAilpín was suspended for four weeks by the AFL tribunal after being charged with a level four offence for striking Cloke and a level two offence for kicking him. He came close to returning to Ireland.

Ó hAilpín was back in the side in Round 5 for the Blues' game with the Western Bulldogs. In Carlton's Round 11 clash with Brisbane at the Gabba, Ó hAilpín played his 50th AFL game, the third Irishman to achieve the milestone. He kicked a goal and set up Brendan Fevola for one as the Blues won by six points. Ó hAilpín played one of his best games against the unbeaten Saints on Round 12 clash. He kicked a vital final quarter goal and set-up another to Brendan Fevola. Ó hAilpín's match performances only got better and, for the first time ever, he kicked four goals in a game against Fremantle in which the Blues came from behind at three quarter time to score an important win.

Before the game that would have seen Ó hAilpín play his first AFL final, he was dropped by the Carlton selection committee before the elimination final against Brisbane.

Following the departure of Fevola in the 2009/10 offseason, Ó hAilpín became the regular full forward/half forward in the Carlton line-up. He began to average over two goals per game, and on 2 May 2010 he kicked a career high five goals, becoming the first Irish player to do so.

During the AFL Trade Week at the end of 2010, Ó hAilpín was linked with a move to the Western Bulldogs after apparently being unhappy at being dropped from the Blues' side midway through the season and never getting back in. He played eight matches in 2011, including two finals, but was delisted at the end of the season; Carlton indicated that it would have preferred to have kept him on the list, but was forced to delist one more of its out-of-contract players due to league requirements that clubs make three changes to their primary list each season.

=== Greater Western Sydney ===
In the following offseason, Ó hAilpín was recruited to the inaugural AFL playing list of the Greater Western Sydney Giants, the club using its fifth round selection in the 2011 AFL National Draft (No. 79 overall) to recruit him. He played his first match for Greater Western Sydney in Round 6, 2012, against his former team Carlton, kicking two goals before rupturing his anterior cruciate ligament in the third quarter of the game. He kicked five goals on his comeback from this injury in Round 4 of the 2013 season against Melbourne. Ó hAilpín was delisted by the Giants at the end of the 2013 season after playing seven games for the club. In December 2013, he was appointed by NSW/ACT, the governing body of Australian rules football in New South Wales, as the "Multicultural Program Coordinator" for Western Sydney.

=== Albury ===
Since 2014, Ó hAilpín has played for Albury in the Ovens & Murray Football League, alongside brother Aisake; he was the O&M's leading goalkicker in 2014, kicking 103 goals in the home-and-away season, and was part of the club's premiership winning teams in 2014 and 2015.

== See also ==
- Irish experiment

Preceded by Eoin Kelly (Tipperary)	Vodafone Young Hurler of the Year; 2003	Succeeded by Brian Murphy (Cork)
