= Niall McInerney =

Irish hurler

Personal information
- Native name: Niall Mac an Airchinnigh (Irish)
- Nickname: Niall Mac
- Born: 8 May 1949 Sixmilebridge, County Clare, Ireland
- Died: 22 November 2004 (aged 55) Galway, Ireland
- Occupation: Secondary school teacher
- Height: 6 ft 1 in (185 cm)

Sport
- Sport: Hurling
- Position: Right corner-back
Clubs
- Years: Club
- Sixmilebridge; Liam Mellows
Club titles
- Galway titles: 2
Inter-county
Years	County	Apps (scores)
1972–1973 1974–1983	Clare; Galway	2 (0-00); 24 (0-00)
Inter-county titles
- All-Irelands: 1
- NHL: 1
- All Stars: 2

Niall McInerney (8 May 1949 – 22 November 2004) was an Irish hurler who played as a right corner-back for the Clare and Galway senior teams.

Born in Sixmilebridge, County Clare, McInerney first played competitive hurling in his youth. He made his first impression on the inter-county scene when he joined the Clare minor team, before later linking up with the under-21 team. He made his senior debut during the 1972 championship. McInerney later played a key role with Galway for almost a decade, and won one All-Ireland medal and one National Hurling League medal. He was an All-Ireland runner-up on three occasions.

As a member of the Connacht inter-provincial team at various times, McInerney won three Railway Cup medal. At club level he was a one-time intermediate championship medallist with Sixmilebridge. McInerney also lined out with Liam Mellows.

Throughout his career McInerney made a combined total of 26 championship appearances for Clare and Galway. His retirement came following the conclusion of the 1983 championship.

McInerney is widely regarded as one of Galway's greatest-ever hurlers. He has often been voted onto teams made up of the sport's greats, including at full-back on the Fitzgibbon Cup Hurling Team of the Century.

In retirement from playing, McInerney became involved in team management and coaching. At schools level he was involved in coaching the Galway vocational schools' hurlers to a remarkable sixteen All-Ireland titles, including a record eight-in-a-row. He also helped Moneenageisha Vocational School to two All-Ireland titles. McInerney later served as a selector with the Galway senior team.

== Playing career ==
=== Club ===
McInerney began his club career at juvenile level with Sixmilebridge. His first success was an under-16 B championship medal in 1963.

In 1971 Sixmilebridge reached the final of the intermediate championship. McInerney was at left corner-back, however, he had a disappointing game. In the end, Sixmilebridge crushed Tubber by 4–14 to 4–4, and McInerney won a championship medal.

After moving to Galway McInerney joined the Liam Mellows club.

=== Inter-county ===
In the mid sixties McInerney first came to prominence on the inter-county scene as a member of the Clare minor hurling team. He later joined the under-21 side, before making a number of appearances for the Clare seniors.

McInerney made his senior championship debut with Galway on 7 July 1974 in a 3–19 to 4–10 All-Ireland quarter-final defeat of Kildare.

In 1975 Galway made a long-awaited breakthrough. A 4–9 to 4–6 defeat of Tipperary gave McInerney a National Hurling League medal. Galway later qualified for an All-Ireland final meeting with reigning champions Kilkenny, their first appearance in the championship decider in seventeen years and the very first seventy-minute final. Playing with the wind in the first half, Galway found themselves 0–9 to 1–3 down at the interval having played poorly. Early in the second half Kilkenny scored an early 1–3 to put this game to bed, and although Galway did reply with 1–1 and were only four points behind with twenty-five minutes left on the clock, there was never any doubt in this match. Galway were eventually defeated by 2–22 to 2–10. In spite of this defeat McInerney later won his first All-Star award.

Four years later Galway shocked four-in-a-row hopefuls Cork in the All-Ireland semi-final and qualified for an All-Ireland final showdown with Kilkenny. In one of the worst All-Ireland finals of the decade, Galway goalkeeper Séamus Shinnors had an absolute nightmare of a game. A 70-yards free by Liam "Chunky" O'Brien after just four minutes dipped, hit off Shinnors and ended up in the Galway net. Galway fought back and went two points up twelve minutes into the second half, however, they failed to score for the rest of the game. Four minutes before the end of the game another long-range free for Kilkenny ended up in the net behind Shinnors. It was a score which summed up the day for McInerney's side as Kilkenny went on to win by 2–12 to 1–8.

In 1980 Galway defeated Kildare and Offaly to reach a second consecutive All-Ireland final. Munster champions Limerick provided the opposition on this occasion and an exciting championship decider followed. Bernie Forde and P. J. Molloy goals for Galway meant that the men from the west led by 2–7 to 1–5 at half-time. Éamonn Cregan single-handedly launched the Limerick counter-attack in the second-half. Over the course of the game he scored 2–7, including an overhead goal and a point in which he showed the ball to full-back Conor Hayes and nonchalantly drove the ball over the bar. It was not enough to stem the tide and Galway went on to win the game by 2–15 to 3–9. It was Galway's first All-Ireland title since 1923, with McInerney picking up a winners' medal and the celebrations surpassed anything ever seen in Croke Park. McInerney later collected a second All-Star award.

McInerney played his last championship game on 7 August 1983, when Galway were defeated by Cork in the All-Ireland semi-final.

=== Inter-provincial ===
McInerney also lined out with Connacht in the inter-provincial series of games and enjoyed much success.

In 1979 McInerney was at full-back as Connacht reached the inter-provincial decider. A 1–13 to 1–9 defeat by Leinster was the result on that occasion. McInerney was moved to corner-back in 1980 as Connacht faced Railway Cup specialists Munster in the decider. A low-scoring game followed, however, a 1–5 to 0–7 victory gave Connacht their first Railway Cup title since 1947. It was McInerney's first winners' medal in the competition.

After surrendering their title the following year, Connacht reached the Railway Cup decider once again in 1982. A 3–8 t 2–9 defeat of Leinster gave McInerney a second Railway Cup medal.

Connacht reached the Railway Cup final again in 1983. A 0–10 to 1–5 victory gave McInerney his third Railway Cup medal, while the province retained the title for the first time in their history.

== Personal life ==
Born in Sixmilebridge, County Clare, McInerney moved to Galway during his studies at University College Galway. He settled in the city and found employment as a teacher of science and maths at Moneenageisha Vocational School. McInerney later married Mary Gilmore, a medical doctor from Moylough and the couple had three sons. McInerney died on 22 November 2004 following a short illness.

== Honours ==
=== Player ===
Sixmilebridge

- Clare Intermediate Hurling Championship (1): 1971
- Clare Junior B Football Championship (1): 1965
- Clare Under-16 B Hurling Championship (1): 1963

Galway

- All-Ireland Senior Hurling Championship (1): 1980
- National Hurling League (1): 1974–75

Connacht

- Railway Cup (3): 1980, 1982, 1983

=== Coach ===
Galway

- All-Ireland Vocational Schools Inter-county Championship (16): 1980, 1981, 1982, 1983, 1984, 1985, 1986, 1987, 1992, 1993, 1994, 1995, 1999, 2001, 2002, 2003

Moneenageisha Vocational School

- All-Ireland Vocational Schools Senior A Hurling Championship (2): 1988, 1990

=== Individual ===
Awards

- All-Star (2): 1975, 1980
