= Pat McLoughney (Tipperary hurler) =

Irish hurler

Personal information
- Native name: Pádraig Ó Maolachtna (Irish)
- Born: 1954 (age 71–72) Terryglass, County Tipperary, Ireland

Sport
- Sport: Hurling
- Position: Goalkeeper
Club
- Years: Club
- Shannon Rovers
Club titles
- Tipperary titles: 0
Inter-county*
Years	County	Apps (scores)
1975-1982	Tipperary	7 (0-00)
Inter-county titles
- Munster titles: 0
- All-Irelands: 0
- NHL: 1
- All Stars: 2
- *Inter County team apps and scores correct as of 17:24, 31 January 2018.

Patrick McLoughney (born 1954) is an Irish retired hurler. His league and championship career with the Tipperary senior team lasted eight seasons from 1975 until 1982.

McLoughney made his debut on the inter-county scene when he was selected for the Tipperary minor team in 1972. After an unsuccessful tenure in this grade he subsequently joined the Tipperary under-21 team. McLoughney joined the senior team as understudy to Séamus Shinnors during the 1975 championship before eventually becoming first-choice goalkeeper. During his career he won a National Hurling League medal in 1979 as well as back-to-back All Star awards.

== Honours ==
Shannon Rovers

- Tipperary Intermediate Hurling Championship (1): 1986

Tipperary

- National Hurling League (1): 1978-79

Awards

- All Star (2): 1979, 1980
