= Jimmy Cooney (Galway hurler) =

Irish hurler and referee (1955–2023)

Personal information
- Native name: Séamus Ó Cuana (Irish)
- Born: 28 July 1955 Bullaun, County Galway, Ireland
- Died: 31 July 2023 (aged 68) Bullaun, County Galway, Ireland
- Occupation: Farmer
- Height: 5 ft 9 in (175 cm)

Sport
- Sport: Hurling
- Position: Left corner-back
Club
- Years: Club
- Sarsfields
Club titles
- Galway titles: 3
- Connacht titles: 3
- All-Ireland Titles: 1
Inter-county*
Years	County	Apps (scores)
1979–1982	Galway	9 (0–00)
Inter-county titles
- All-Irelands: 1
- NHL: 0
- All Stars: 2
- *Inter County team apps and scores correct as of 17:27, 2 February 2013.

Jimmy Cooney (28 July 1955 – 31 July 2023) was an Irish hurler who played as a left corner-back at senior level for the Galway county team.

Born in Bullaun, County Galway, Cooney first arrived on the inter-county scene when he made his senior debut in the 1979 championship. Cooney went on to play a key part for Galway for a brief period, and won one All-Ireland medal. He was an All-Ireland runner-up on one occasion.

As a member of the Connacht inter-provincial team at various times, Cooney won one Railway Cup medal in 1980. At club level he was a one-time Connacht medallist with Sarsfields. In addition to this he also won two championship medals.

Throughout his career Cooney made 9 championship appearances. His retirement came following the conclusion of the 1982 championship.

His brother, Joe, also had a lengthy career with Galway.

In retirement from playing, Cooney became an inter-county referee. He is best remembered for blowing the full-time whistle five minutes early during the All-Ireland semi-final between Offaly and Clare in 1998, prompting Offaly fans to stage a sit down protest in Croke Park. Clare were winning at the time, however, Offaly won the subsequent re-fixture.

Jimmy Cooney died on 31 July 2023, at the age of 68.

== Playing career ==
=== Club ===
Cooney experienced much success at club hurling with Sarsfields.

In 1980 Sarsfields qualified for the final of the senior championship for the first time in history, with Cooney lining out at midfield. The free-taking of Michael Mulkerrins secured a narrow 0–11 to 0–9 defeat of Meelick-Eyrecourt and a Galway Senior Hurling Championship medal for Cooney. He later added a Connacht medal to his collection following a convincing 4–12 to 0–5 defeat of Tremane.

Almost a decade later Sarsfields were back in the championship decider once again. A 3–7 to 1–8 defeat of Athenry gave Cooney a second championship medal.

Three years later in 1992 Cooney was in the twilight of his club career. He won an All-Ireland medal as a non-playing substitute following a 1–17 to 2–7 defeat of Kilmallock.

=== Inter-county ===
Cooney made his senior championship debut for Galway on 1 July 1979 in a 1–23 to 3–10 defeat of Laois in the All-Ireland quarter-final. He was an unused substitute for the subsequent All-Ireland final defeat by Kilkenny.

In 1980 Cooney was a regular member of the starting fifteen as Galway reached the All-Ireland decider once again. Limerick provided the opposition on this occasion and an exciting championship decider followed. Bernie Forde and P. J. Molloy goals for Galway meant that the men from the west led by 2–7 to 1–5 at half-time. Éamonn Cregan single-handedly launched the Limerick counter-attack in the second-half. Over the course of the game he scored 2–7, including an overhead goal and a point in which he showed the ball to full-back Conor Hayes and nonchalantly drove the ball over the bar. It was not enough to stem the tide and Galway went on to win the game by 2–15 to 3–9. It was Galway's first All-Ireland title since 1923, with Cooney picking up a winners' medal and the celebrations surpassed anything ever seen in Croke Park.

1981 saw Galway reach a third consecutive All-Ireland final and Offaly were the opponents. Everything seemed to be going well for Cooney's side as Galway hoped to capture an unprecedented second consecutive All-Ireland title. Offaly 'keeper Damien Martin was doing great work in batting out an almost certain Galway goal early in the second-half. With twenty-three minutes left in the game Galway led by six points, however, they failed to score for the rest of the game. Johnny Flaherty hand-passed Offaly's second goal with just three minutes remaining. At the long whistle Galway were defeated by 2–12 to 0–15.

Cooney's last game for Galway was an All-Ireland semi-final defeat by Kilkenny in 1982.

=== Inter-provincial ===
Cooney also lined out with Connacht in the inter-provincial series of games and experienced some success.

In 1979 Cooney was at left wing-back as Connacht reached the inter-provincial decider. A 1–13 to 1–9 defeat by Leinster was the result on that occasion. Cooney retained his place on the team in 1980 as Connacht faced Railway Cup specialists Munster in the decider. A low-scoring game followed, however, a 1–5 to 0–7 victory gave Connacht their first Railway Cup title since 1947. It was Cooney's sole winners' medal in the inter-pro competition.

== Refereeing career ==
In retirement from playing Cooney became an inter-county referee at the highest levels. One of the biggest assignments in the early stages of his career was as referee for Limerick's 4–16 to 2–17 defeat of Kilkenny in the All-Ireland decider in the intermediate grade in 1998.

On 22 August 1998, Cooney was assigned to referee the 1998 All-Ireland semi-final replay between Clare and Offaly at Croke Park. The match had been a fairly uneventful one for Cooney until the 68th minute when he sounded the long whistle to end the match. Clare had won by 1–16 to 2–10, however, it was only then that Cooney realised that he had ended the match two minutes early. Before he could restart the match he was bundled away by some security officials, while the Offaly supporters took to the Croke Park pitch to stage a sit-down protest. Offaly were subsequently granted a replay, which they won, while Cooney, who received death threats after the match, ended his inter-county refereeing career.

== Honours ==
Sarsfields

- All-Ireland Senior Club Hurling Championship: 1993
- Connacht Senior Club Hurling Championship: 1980, 1989, 1992
- Galway Senior Hurling Championship: 1980, 1989, 1992

Galway

- All-Ireland Senior Hurling Championship: 1980

Connacht

- Railway Cup: 1980
