= Aisake Ó hAilpín =

Fijian-Irish sportsperson (born 1985)

Personal information
- Born: 24 August 1985 (age 41) Bankstown, Sydney, Australia
- Height: 6 ft 6 in (198 cm)

Sport
- Sport: Hurling
- Position: Full-forward
Club
- Years: Club
- 2004–present: Na Piarsaigh
Club titles
- Cork titles: 1
Inter-county
Years	County	Apps (scores)
2009–2010	Cork	9 (4–4)
Inter-county titles
- Munster titles: 0
- All-Irelands: 0
- NHL: 0
- All Stars: 0

Aisake Faga Ó hAilpín (born 24 August 1985) is a Fijian-Irish sportsperson. He grew up in Cork and played hurling and Gaelic football with Na Piarsaigh. Ó hAilpín played Australian rules football with the Carlton Football Club between 2005 and 2008. Following this, he spent two seasons playing hurling at inter-county level with the Cork senior panel before signing a contract with Australian rules club, Maribyrnong Park Football Club.

== Playing career ==
=== Na Piarsaigh ===
Ó hAilpín played club hurling and Gaelic football with the Na Piarsaigh club on the north side of Cork city. He enjoyed little success in the minor or under-21 grades.

By 2004 Ó hAilpín had joined the Na Piarsaigh senior hurling team. That year the club qualified for the final of the county senior championship for the first time in almost a decade. East Cork stalwarts Cloyne provided the opposition on that occasion. The first half was a close affair which saw Cloyne take a one-point lead at the interval. Na Piarsaigh, however, produced an exceptional second-half display and secured a 0–17 to 0–10 victory, with Ó hAilpín finishing as the game's top scorer with five points. It was his first, and to date his only, county championship winners' medal.

=== Carlton ===
Following Na Piarsaigh's county championship triumph in late 2004, Ó hAilpín decided to travel to Australia where he took up Australian rules football. He joined the Carlton Football Club in Melbourne where he played alongside his brother Setanta.

Ó hAilpín was placed on the Carlton Football Club's rookie list for the 2005 AFL season, however, his development was slow. He spent 2005 in the reserves at Carlton's VFL-affiliate, the Northern Bullants, and was in and out of the Bullants' senior team in 2006.

Ó hAilpín began his third year again on the rookie list in 2007, which had to be his final rookie-listed season by AFL rules, playing exclusively in the Bullants' seniors and predominantly in the ruck. He was believed to be close to elevation and selection, with Carlton coach Denis Pagan confirming this in a post-match press conference in June, but shortly afterwards Ó hAilpín sustained a season-ending groin injury. Carlton announced during the 2007 season that they would elevate Ó hAilpín to the senior list for 2008 and later made it official during the post season. After promising so much potential, Ó hAilpín failed to register a senior game and was delisted at the end of the 2008 season and left Australia.

=== Cork senior ===
In February 2009, having returned to Ireland, Ó hAilpín played in several challenge matches for the Cork football and hurling teams. He eventually spent the year with the hurling panel. Ó hAilpín started and was selected as man of the match in Cork's surprise first-round championship win over Tipperary. However, he failed to impress in the remainder of the season and announced a return to Australian rules at the end of 2010.

=== Suburban Australian rules football ===
Ó hAilpín returned to Melbourne in 2011, and has played with a variety of suburban and country teams since. In 2011, he played for Maribyrnong Park in the Essendon District Football League, alongside former Carlton teammate Luke Livingston. In 2012, he moved to the Montmorency in the Northern Football League. In 2013, he played for Hillside in the EDFL. Since 2014, he has played for Albury in the Ovens & Murray Football League, alongside brother Setanta.

== See also ==
- Irish experiment
