= 1990 All-Ireland Senior Hurling Championship final =

1990 All-Ireland Senior Hurling Final
- Event: 1990 All-Ireland Senior Hurling Championship
Cork	Galway
5-15	2-21
- Date: 2 September 1990
- Venue: Croke Park, Dublin
- Man of the Match: Tomás Mulcahy
- Referee: John Moore (Waterford)
- Attendance: 63,954

The 1990 All-Ireland Senior Hurling Championship Final was the 103rd All-Ireland Final and the culmination of the 1990 All-Ireland Senior Hurling Championship, an inter-county hurling tournament for the top teams in Ireland. The match was held at Croke Park, Dublin, on 2 September 1990, between Cork and Galway. The Connacht men lost to their Munster opponents on a scoreline of 5-15 to 2-21. The match is regarded as the best championship decider of the decade.

== Route to the final ==
=== Cork ===
Cork's senior hurling team made an early start in the 1990 championship. On 20 May the team traveled to Austin Stack Park in Tralee and played Kerry in the opening round of the Munster Championship. A score line of 3-16 to 3-7 gave Cork a respectable win, however, the team stumbled at some stages and looked unlikely contenders for Munster and All-Ireland honours.

Two weeks later on 3 June Cork played Waterford in the Munster semi-final at Semple Stadium in Thurles. Waterford had defeated Cork in the championship the previous year and doubts about Cork's team selection surfaced again. In the end Cork made light of the opposition and finished easy winners with a 4-15 to 1-8 victory.

Cork's next outing in the championship was a Munster final meeting with arch-rivals Tipperary at Semple Stadium on 15 July. Tipp, as reigning All-Ireland champions, were installed as the favourites while Cork's problems mounted due to the absence of star players Tomás Mulcahy and Teddy McCarthy due to injuries. An infamous interview in which Tipperary manager Michael ‘Babs’ Keating wrote off Cork's chances by stating that ‘donkeys don’t win derbies’ severely riled the Cork team. It riled the team so much that they played like they had never played before. Cork's centre half-forward Mark Foley played the game of his life and scored 2-7 from play. Cork won the game by 4-16 to 2-14.

All-Ireland hurling semi-final day at Croke Park was 5 August and Cork faced Antrim. The Ulster men had shocked Offaly in the All-Ireland semi-final of 1989 so nothing was left to chance for Cork. In spite of this few people expected an upset and Cork had a reasonable easy 2-20 to 1-13 victory.

=== Galway ===
Galway, with no provincial championship to participate in advanced directly to the All-Ireland series of games. They opened their championship campaign at Croke Park on 22 July where they played London, the All-Ireland ‘B’ champions. Galway had a reasonably comfortable win in their opening game as the exiles fell by 1-23 to 2-11.

All-Ireland hurling semi-final day at Croke Park was 5 August and Galway faced Offaly in the second game played that day. Offaly were the masters of the Leinster Championship for a third year in-a-row, however, they were out of their depth in the All-Ireland series once again. Again Galway had a comfortable win on a score line of 1-16 to 2-7, however, they had qualified for the All-Ireland final without being tested greatly.

== All-Ireland final ==
=== Overview ===
Sunday 2 September was the date of the 1990 All-Ireland senior hurling final between Cork and Galway. Cork were appearing in their first championship decider since 1986 when they defeated Galway to take the title. Galway were appearing in a fifth All-Ireland final in six years and were hoping to take a third title in four years having defeated Kilkenny and Tipperary respectively in 1987 and 1988. At the time, Galway had never beaten Cork in an All-Ireland final.

The attendance at the match was 63,954.

=== Match report ===
At 3:30pm referee John Moore of Waterford threw in the sliothar and the game was on in the 103rd All-Ireland hurling final. Straight away Galway went on the attack after just ten seconds of play, however, Michael McGrath’s shot failed to hit the target and he registered his team's first wide of the day. Immediately after the puck-out the play switched to the opposite end of the field where the sliothar broke to Kevin Hennessy. He made no mistake in slotting it into the Galway net for a goal after just 48 seconds of play. The Galway men found it difficult to settle in the game, however, captain Joe Cooney sent over a point to open the Galway scoring account. Both sides exchanged wides over the next few minutes of play before John Fitzgibbon stretched Cork's lead again with a point. Joe Cooney responded with a point from a trick angle by the sideline before Pete Finnerty’s expertly taken sideline cut was stopped on the goal line and cleared by goalkeeper Ger Cunningham.

Joe Cooney quickly tapped over another point before Tony Keady scored an inspirational point following a great solo run from his usual position at centre half-back. Kevin Hennessy gave the Cork men a two-point cushion once again when he slotted over a free before Joe Cooney had the chance to level the game. Both his shots went wide. Kevin Hennessy was on hand again in the thirteenth minute to send over another free to give Cork some more breathing space. Not long after this the sliothar fell to Galway forward Noel Lane who was relatively unmarked in front of the Cork goal. There was no doubt about it that he was going for a goal; however, his shot just went over the crossbar for a point. Kevin Hennessy cancelled this point almost immediately when he sent over a point of his own after receiving a facial injury.

Ger FitzGerald got his name on the scoring sheet soon afterwards when he put his team four points clear of their opponents. With the game running away from them the Galway men clicked into gear and began the fight back. Martin Naughton got things back on track with a point before Joe Cooney added to his tally with Galway’s first goal of the day. His first shot on target was blocked by Ger Cunningham; however, the rebound allowed him to kick the sliothar into the net to level the scores. Éanna Ryan pointed in the twentieth minute to give Galway the lead for the first time in the game. Joe Cooney soon chipped in with another point to give his side a two-point lead. Cork’s response was not an accurate one as Tony O'Sullivan sent a free wide before Noel Lane rifled over another point. Once again it was clear from his facial expressions that Lane was going for a goal. Nonetheless, his effort had the Galway fans on their feet cheering his name to the tune of ‘Olé, Olé, Olé, Olé.’ Both sides exchanged wides following this before Teddy McCarthy sent over a point to claw one back for ‘the Rebels.’

Noel Lane added to his tally with another point before the game witnessed one of its first controversial moments. Joe Cooney was heading towards the Cork goal with one thing on his mind. He passed the sliothar to Éanna Ryan who tapped it into the net for another goal. Unfortunately, the goal was disallowed as the referee had blown his whistle for a foul on Joe Cooney. The goal didn't stand; however, Cooney converted the free without difficulty. Cork's woes continued with Jim Cashman missing a long-range free before Martin Naughton and Joe Cooney both recorded two more points. The finals core of the half was an absolute delightful one as Cork's Kevin McGuckin sent a sideline cut straight over the crossbar for a point. After the first thirty-five minutes Galway had a 1-13 to 1-8 lead.

Immediately after the restart Cork went on the attack, however, their efforts came to nothing. It was Michael McGrath of Galway who registered the first point of the second half as his side stretched their lead even further. Anthony Cunningham was the last Galway forward to get his name on the scoring sheet when he sent over a point to give his team a lead of six. Cork needed a new plan of attack at this stage and a positional switch of Tomás Mulcahy to the half-forward line paid dividends when he sent over Cork's first point of the second-half. Michael Coleman cancelled out this point with one of his own before Kevin Hennessy put another free over the crossbar for Cork. Martin Naughton pointed for Galway before the forwards launched an all-out attack ob Ger Cunningham's goal once again. This attack came to nothing and Cunningham was able to clear the sliothar away down the field towards Tomás Mulcahy.

With nine minutes gone in the second-half Cork were given a major boost when Mulcahy rifled a shot into the Galway net for a goal. Both sides exchanged wides after this score before the second turning point of the game occurred. Martin Naughton had the sliothar balanced on his hurley and broke away from his marker and headed for goal. His shot, however, was saved by Ger Cunningham's face and went wide. While a 65-metre free should have been awarded Cunningham was allowed to puck the sliothar out as normal. This set up another Cork attack with Tony O’Sullivan clawing back a point for Cork. Three more wides followed, one for Galway and two for Cork, before Mark Foley pointed in what was only his sixth championship game.

Both sides exchanged further wides before Cork gained some momentum. Another save and a clearance by Ger Cunningham set up another Cork attack at the other end of the field. Kevin Hennessy collected the sliothar on his hurley and headed for a goal. A pass to Mark Foley gave Cork a much needed lift as Foley rifled the sliothar into the net for a Cork lead. Immediately after the puck-out Galway drew level again courtesy of an Éanna Ryan point. Teddy McCarthy responded for Cork with an inspirational point that he scored over his shoulder and not even facing the goal. Up at the other end of the field Noel Lane leveled the scores again when his shot on goal went straight over the crossbar for the third time. Galway decided to freshen up things for the final few minutes of play as Anthony Cunningham made way for the veteran goal-scorer Brendan Lynskey.

While Lynskey's introduction was designed to give Galway a lift the exact opposite happened. The sliothar flew down the field to John Fitzgibbon who made no mistake in sending his shot straight into the net. It was his fifth goal of the championship. Less than ninety seconds later the sliothar found its way to Fitzgibbon again who made no mistake in sending in his second goal of the day. Straight away after the puck-out Galway turned defence into attack when Brendan Lynskey scored a goal to reduce Cork's lead to three points once again. With six minutes left in this see-saw All-Ireland final no side was celebrating prematurely. Tomás Mulcahy gave Cork some respite again when he sent over another point, however, Martin Naughton fought back immediately when he pointed for Galway. A mistake at this stage of the game could prove costly as both sides were so close to victory. Tony O’Sullivan gave Cork a four-point lead again before Joe Cooney, one of the start players of the game, sent over a point for Galway and the final score of the day. A short few seconds later the referee blew the final whistle and Cork were the All-Ireland champions of 1990 on a score line of 5-15 to 2-21.

=== Statistics ===
1990-09-02
15:30 BST

Cork	5-15 – 2-21	Galway
J. Fitzgibbon (2-1); K. Hennessy (1-4); T. Mulcahy (1-2); M. Foley (1-1); T. McCarthy (0-3); T. O'Sullivan (0-2); G. FitzGerald (0-1); K. McGuckin (0-1)		J. Cooney (1-7); N. Lane (0-4); M. Naughton (0-4); B. Lynskey (1-0); É. Ryan (0-2); T. Keady (0-1); M. McGrath (0-1); A. Cunningham (0-1); M. Coleman (0-1)

Croke Park, Dublin
Attendance: 63,954
Referee: John Moore (Waterford)

CORK:
GK	1	Ger Cunningham
RCB	2	John Considine
FB	3	Denis Walsh
LCB	4	Seán O'Gorman
RWB	5	Seánie McCarthy
CB	6	Jim Cashman
LWB	7	Kieran McGuckin
M	8	Brendan O'Sullivan
M	9	Teddy McCarthy
RWF	10	Ger FitzGerald
CF	11	Mark Foley
LWF	12	Tony O'Sullivan
RCF	13	Tomás Mulcahy (c)
FF	14	Kevin Hennessy
LCF	15	John Fitzgibbon
Substitutes:
LCF		Dave Quirke
RWF		Cathal Casey

GALWAY:
GK	1	John Commins
RCB	2	Dermot Fahy
FB	3	Seán Treacy
LCB	4	Ollie Kilkenny
RWB	5	Pete Finnerty
CB	6	Tony Keady
LWB	7	Gerry McInerney
M	8	Michael Coleman
M	9	Pat Malone
RWF	10	Anthony Cunningham
CF	11	Joe Cooney (c)
LWF	12	Martin Naughton
RCF	13	Michael McGrath
FF	14	Noel Lane
LCF	15	Éanna Ryan
Substitutes:
LCF		Tom Monaghan
RWF		Brendan Lynskey

MATCH RULES

- 70 minutes.
- Replay if scores level.
- Three named substitutes

Unused Cork Substitutes Tom Kingston, Christy Connery, Pat Buckley, Michael Mullins, Anthony O'Sullivan Manager Fr Michael O'Brien Trainer Gerald McCarthy Selectors Liam O'Tuama, Frank Murphy, Denis Hurley, Martin Coleman
