= Barry Harte =

Irish hurler

Personal information
- Native name: Barra Ó hAirt (Irish)
- Born: 1967 (age 58–59) Timoleague, County Cork, Ireland
- Occupation: Dentist

Sport
- Sport: Hurling
- Position: Centre-forward
Clubs
- Years: Club
- Argideen Rangers → Carbery
Club titles
- Cork titles: 1
College(s)
- Years: College
- University College Cork; Trinity College, Dublin
College titles
- Fitzgibbon titles: 1
Inter-county
Years	County	Apps (scores)
1986–1989	Cork	0 (0-00)
Inter-county titles
- Munster titles: 0
- All-Irelands: 0
- NHL: 0
- All Stars: 0

Barry Harte (born 1967) is an Irish hurling manager and former player. At club level, he played with Argideen Rangers, divisional side Carbery, and also lined out at inter-county level with various Cork teams.

== Playing career ==
Harte played hurling and Gaelic football at all levels as a boarding student at St Finbarr's College in Cork. He won a Dean Ryan Cup medal in 1985 after "Farna's" 1-09 to 1-05 win over St Colman's College in the final. Harte later captained the senior team to the Dr Harty Cup title in 1984, before later winning a Dr Croke Cup medal after a 1–15 to 0–08 defeat of St Kieran's College in the 1984 All-Ireland colleges final. He won a Fitzgibbon Cup medal with University College Cork in 1987, before completing his studies at Trinity College, Dublin.

At club level, Harte played hurling and Gaelic football with Argideen Rangers. Between 1993 and 2003, he was part of three West Cork JAHC title-winning teams, while he also claimed a West Cork JAFC medal in 1994. He added a Cork JAHC medal to his collection in 1996 after a 3–09 to 0–11 defeat of Fr O'Neill's in the final. Harte also earned selection for Carbery and won a Cork SHC medal after captaining the team to a 3–13 to 3–06 win over Midleton in the 1996 final.

Harte first appeared on the inter-county scene with Cork as a dual player at minor level in 1985. He won an All-Ireland MHC medal after a win over Wexford, but later faced defeat by Mayo in the 1985 All-Ireland MFC final. Harte later progressed to under-21 level and won an All-Ireland U21HC medal after Cork's 4-11 to 1-05 win over Kilkenny in the 1988 All-Ireland under-21 final.

Harte also progressed to the senior team and made a number of appearances in the National Hurling League and in tournament and challenge games. He later won two Munster JHC medals before ending his inter-county career by collecting an All-Ireland JHC medal as a substitute in 1994.

== Coaching career ==
Harte became player-selector with the Argideen Rangers intermediate hurling team in 2005, before taking over as manager of the team. He guided the team to the Cork IHC title in 2005 after a 2–08 to 1–08 win over Nemo Rangers in a final replay.

== Honours ==
=== Player ===
St Finbarr's College

- Dr Croke Cup: 1984 (c)
- Dr Harty Cup: 1984 (c)
- Dean Ryan Cup: 1982

University College Cork

- Fitzgibbon Cup: 1987

Argideen Rangers

- Cork Junior A Hurling Championship: 1996
- West Cork Junior A Hurling Championship: 1993, 1996, 2003
- West Cork Junior A Football Championship: 1994

Carbery

- Cork Senior Hurling Championship: 1994 (c)

Cork

- All-Ireland Junior Hurling Championship: 1994
- Munster Junior Hurling Championship: 1992, 1994
- All-Ireland Under-21 Hurling Championship: 1988
- Munster Under-21 Hurling Championship: 1988
- All-Ireland Minor Hurling Championship: 1985
- Munster Minor Hurling Championship: 1985
- Munster Minor Football Championship: 1985

=== Management ===
Argideen Rangers

- Cork Intermediate Hurling Championship: 2005

== Personal Insolvency Deal ==
In 2022, Barry Harte struck a €170m personal insolvency deal (PID) in the High Court. The PID allowed Harte to retain €6,000 worth of assets, including a computer and clothes. Living expenses of €2,800/month were accounted for. Mr. Harte's total secured and unsecured debt was over €170.0m. Most creditors received nothing at all, with some "lucky ones" getting 0.042% of what they were owed. The unsecured debt, which is the majority of what's owed, was settled with a €80,000 payment, €70,000 of which will go to creditors. The secured and preferential creditors received a better return due to the handing-over of Mr. Harte's assets.
