= Cyril Farrell =

Irish hurling manager, selector, trainer, and coach

Personal information
- Native name: Coireall Ó Fearghail (Irish)
- Born: 1950 (age 75–76) Galway, Ireland
- Occupation: Retired secondary school principal

Sport
- Sport: Hurling
Inter-county management
- Years: Team
- 1979–1982 1984–1991 1996–1998: Galway; Galway; Galway
Inter-county titles as manager
County	League	Province	All-Ireland
Galway	3	2	3

Cyril Farrell (born 1 August 1950) is an Irish former hurling manager, selector, trainer and coach. He was the manager of the senior Galway county team on three occasions, during which time he became the county's longest-serving manager and most successful in terms of major titles won.

After being involved in team management and coaching in all grades at club level with Tommy Larkin's, as well as with the Galway minor and under-21 teams, Farrell was appointed coach of the Galway senior team for the first time in 1979. As manager at various times over much of the following twenty years, he led Galway through a period of unprecedented national dominance, winning seven major honours. These include three All-Ireland Championships, including back-to-back titles in 1987 and 1988, two Connacht Championships and two National Hurling Leagues.

Farrell regularly appears as a hurling pundit on RTÉ's The Sunday Game.

He won a Fitzgibbon Cup with University College Galway in 1977.

== Honours ==
=== Player ===
University College Galway

- Fitzgibbon Cup: 1977

Tommy Larkins

- Connacht Senior Club Hurling Championship: 1971
- Galway Senior Hurling Championship: 1971

=== Manager ===
Galway

- All-Ireland Senior Hurling Championship: 1980, 1987, 1988
- Connacht Senior Hurling Championship: 1997, 1998
- National Hurling League: 1986-87, 1988-89
- All-Ireland Under-21 Hurling Championship: 1978, 1996
- All-Ireland Minor Hurling Championship: 1983

Connacht

- Railway Cup: 1980, 1986, 1987, 1989, 1991

Sporting positions
Preceded by Babs Keating	Galway Senior Hurling Manager; 1979–1982	Succeeded by Frank Corcoran
Preceded by Bernie O'Connor	Galway Senior Hurling Manager; 1984–1991	Succeeded by Jarlath Cloonan
Preceded by Mattie Murphy	Galway Senior Hurling Manager; 1996–1998	Succeeded by Mattie Murphy
Achievements
Preceded by Pat Henderson; Eddie Keher	All-Ireland SHC winning manager 1980	Succeeded by Dermot Healy
Preceded by Johnny Clifford	All-Ireland SHC winning manager 1987–1988	Succeeded by Babs Keating
