= Pete Finnerty =

Irish hurler and coach

Personal information
- Native name: Peadar Ó Fiannachta (Irish)
- Born: 4 March 1964 (age 62) Mullagh, County Galway, Ireland
- Occupations: Bank official, businessman
- Height: 6 ft 1 in (185 cm)

Sport
- Sport: Hurling
- Position: Right wing-back
Club
- Years: Club
- Mullagh
Club titles
- Galway titles: 0
Inter-county
- Years: County
- 1983–1994: Galway
Inter-county titles
- All-Irelands: 2
- NHL: 2
- All Stars: 5

Peter Finnerty (born 4 March 1964 in Athlone, County Westmeath, Ireland) is an Irish former hurling coach and former player.

Regarded as one of his county's all-time greats, Finnerty had a distinguished playing career at club level with Mullagh and at senior level with the Galway county team. He was a wing-back on the latter team from 1985 until 1994 and collected two All-Ireland titles, one National Hurling League title and five All-Star awards.

In retirement from playing Finnerty has maintained a keen association with the game. He has been a long-serving hurling analyst with RTÉ on both The Sunday Game and Sunday Sport. From 2007 until 2010 Finnerty served as coach, under the management of Martin Brennan, to the Mayo senior hurling team.

== Biography ==
Pete Finnerty was born in Mullagh, County Galway in 1964. From a young age he showed great interest in the game of hurling and, in time, he would become a key member of the successful Galway team of the 1980s. He was educated principally at Ballinasloe secondary school where he fostered a reputation for himself as a no-nonsense defender. It was here that Finnerty first experienced success, winning three All-Ireland Vocational Schools medals. Finnerty later worked with Bank of Ireland and also owns a franchise Supermac's restaurant in Tuam since opening it in the early 1990s.

== Playing career ==
=== Club ===
Finnerty played his club hurling with Mullagh, the club made famous by Tony Reddin.

=== Inter-county ===
Finnerty's hurling exploits in secondary school lead to an automatic selection on the Galway minor hurling team. He played against Tipperary in the All-Ireland minor final of 1982, however, he ended up on the losing side that day. Finnerty quickly graduated onto Galway's under-21 team, subsequently winning an All-Ireland medal with the side in 1983. His son Niall is one of the brightest football prospects in Galway at the moment. He is currently player of the Cortoon Shamrocks under-21 team.

That same year Finnerty made his senior debut in a National Hurling League game and he captured a place of his own on the team by the time the 1985 championship got underway. That year he played in his first All-Ireland final; however, victory went to Offaly on the day. In spite of this he was still presented with an All-Star award. In 1986 Galway reached another All-Ireland final; however, they were again defeated, this time by Cork. A second All-Star was collected by Finnerty. In 1987, in their third All-Ireland final appearance in-a-row, Galway took on Kilkenny. At the third time of asking Galway emerged victorious and Finnerty finally captured his first All-Ireland medal at senior level, before collecting his third All-Star award.

In 1988 Tipperary were Galway's opponents in their fourth consecutive All-Ireland final appearance. Finnerty had another solid performance at wing-back and claimed his second All-Ireland title in the process, before later winning his fourth consecutive All-Star award. In 1989 Finnerty began the year by winning his first National Hurling League title; however, Galway's star centre-back, Tony Keady, was banned from playing for a year. The side had contemplated withdrawing from the championship in protest, however, they decided to play, eventually losing out to Tipp in the All-Ireland semi-final. In 1990 Finnerty played in his fifth All-Ireland final in six seasons. Galway were the hot favourites to beat Cork and it looked as if that prediction would come true when the tribesmen went 7 points up. Cork clawed their way back and eventually went on to win on a scoreline of 5-15 to 2-21. In spite of this loss Finnerty still won a fifth All-Star award.

Two years later in 1992 Finnerty missed the entire championship due to a cruciate knee injury. He returned in 1993 but could not command a regular place on the team. He did come on as a substitute in that year's All-Ireland final; however, victory went to Kilkenny. Finnerty regained his fitness in 1994 and played his last game against Offaly in the All-Ireland semi-final.

== Post-playing career ==
In retirement from playing Finnerty has maintained a keen interest in hurling. In 2000 his exceptional talent was acknowledged when he was named on the Galway "Hurling Team of the Millennium." He also worked as an analyst on RTÉ's Gaelic games programme The Sunday Game.

In 2008 Finnerty became coach of the Mayo senior hurling team, and took them to the Christy Ring Cup semi-final that season, before being defeated by eventual champions Carlow. Finnerty remained as Mayo coach in 2009 and again guided them to the Tier Two hurling championship semi-final, this time going out to Down. In December 2009 Finnerty agreed to continue as coach of the Mayo hurlers for the 2010 season.

== Honours ==
Galway Schools

- All-Ireland Vocational Schools Senior Hurling Championship (3): 1980, 1981, 1982

Mullagh

- Galway Intermediate Hurling Championship (1): 1982

Galway

- All-Ireland Senior Hurling Championship (2): 1987, 1988
- National Hurling League (2): 1986–87, 1988–89
- All-Ireland Under-21 Hurling Championship (1): 1983

Connacht

- Railway Cup (3): 1986, 1989, 1991
