= 1990 Munster Senior Hurling Championship final =

- Event: 1990 Munster Senior Hurling Championship
Cork	Tipperary
4-16	2-14
- Date: 15 July 1990
- Venue: Semple Stadium, Thurles
- Man of the Match: Mark Foley
- Referee: J. Moore (Waterford)
- Attendance: 49,782
- Weather: Dry

The 1990 Munster Senior Hurling Championship final was a hurling match played on Sunday 15 July 1990 at Semple Stadium. It was contested by Cork and Tipperary. Cork, captained by Kieran McGuckin, claimed the title, beating defending champions Tipperary on a scoreline of 4–16 to 2–14.

== Match ==
=== Details ===
15 July
Final

Tipperary	2-14 – 4-16	Cork
M. Cleary (1-5), N. English (1-4), C. Stakelum (0-2), J. Leahy (0-2), D. Ryan (0-1).		M. Foley (2-7), J. Fitzgibbon (2-0), T. O'Sullivan (0-5), C. Casey (0-1), G. FitzGerald (0-1), K. Hennessy (0-1), D. Quirke (0-1).

Semple Stadium, Thurles
Attendance: 49,782
Referee: J. Moore (Waterford)
