= John Commins (hurler) =

Irish hurler (born 1965)

Personal information
- Native name: Seán Ó Coimín (Irish)
- Nickname: John John
- Born: 26 September 1965 (age 61) Gort, County Galway, Ireland
- Occupation: Sales Representative
- Height: 5 ft 11 in (180 cm)

Sport
- Sport: Hurling
- Position: Goalkeeper
Club
- Years: Club
- 1983-2011: Gort
Club titles
- Galway titles: 1
- Connacht titles: 1
- All-Ireland Titles: 0
Inter-county*
Years	County	Apps (scores)
1986-1990	Galway	12 (1-00)
Inter-county titles
- All-Irelands: 4
- NHL: 1
- All Stars: 2
- *Inter County team apps and scores correct as of 19:04, 22 January 2013.

John Commins (born 26 September 1965) is an Irish retired hurler who played as a goalkeeper for the Galway senior team.

Born on 26 September in Gort, County Galway, Commins first arrived on the inter-county scene when he first linked up with the Galway minor team, before later joining the under-21 side. He made his senior debut during the 1986 championship. Commins went on to play a key role for Galway for the next few years, and won two All-Ireland medals and one National Hurling League medal. He was an All-Ireland runner-up on two occasions.

As a member of the Connacht inter-provincial team at various times, Commins won two Railway Cup medals. At club level he is a one-time Connacht medallist with Gort. In addition to this he also won one championship medal.

Commins's retirement came following the conclusion of the 1990 championship.

Commins is married and has three children, who all play hurling.

== Early life ==
John Commins was born in Gort, County Galway in 1965. From a young age he showed great interest in the game of hurling and, in time, he would become a key member of the great Galway team of the 1980s.

== Playing career ==
=== Club ===
Commins played his club hurling with his local Gort club. He had some success at underage levels. He won a Senior County championship medal in 1983, and won the Connaught club medal the same year.

=== Inter-county ===
Commins first came to prominence as an inter-county hurler on Galway's minor team in the early 1980s. He won an All-Ireland medal in 1983 and quickly graduated onto the under-21 side where he won another All-Ireland medal in 1986. That same year Commins made his debut as goalkeeper on the senior hurling team, with Galway reaching their second consecutive All-Ireland final. In the game against Cork Commins ran the length of the pitch to score a 21-yard free, however, victory still went to the Munster champions. In 1987, in their third All-Ireland final appearance in-a-row, Galway took on Kilkenny. At the third time of asking Galway emerged victorious and Commins finally captured his first All-Ireland medal.

In 1988 Tipperary were Galway's opponents in their fourth consecutive All-Ireland final appearance. Commins had another solid performance as goalkeeper and claimed his second All-Ireland title in the process, before later winning his first All-Star award. In 1989 Commins began the year by winning his first National Hurling League title, however, Galway's star centre-back, Tony Keady, was banned from playing for a year. The side had contemplated withdrawing from the championship in protest, however, they decided to play, eventually losing out to Tipp in the All-Ireland semi-final. Commins received "man of the match" for this performance.

In 1990 Commins played in his fourth All-Ireland final in five seasons. Galway were the hot favourites to beat Cork and it looked as if that prediction would come true when the tribesmen went 7 points up. Cork scored 4 goals in the second half and Commins was the scapegoat for the 5-15 to 2-21 defeat and was dropped from the Galway team for the 1991 championship. At the age of just 25 years Commins’s inter-county hurling career had drawn to a close.

== Honours ==
=== Player ===
Gort

- Connacht Senior Club Hurling Championship (1): 1983
- Galway Senior Hurling Championship (1): 1983

Galway

- All-Ireland Senior Hurling Championship (2): 1987, 1988
- National Hurling League (2): 1986–87, 1988–89
- All-Ireland Under-21 Hurling Championship (1): 1986
- All-Ireland Minor Hurling Championship (1): 1983

Connacht

- Railway Cup (2): 1987, 1989

=== Management ===
Galway

- All-Ireland Minor Hurling Championship (2): 2015, 2017
