= 1914 Kilkenny Senior Hurling Championship =

Annual hurling competition season

- Champions: Johnstown (1st title); John Holohan (captain)
- Runners-up: Erin's Own; Mick Leahy (captain)

The 1914 Kilkenny Senior Hurling Championship was the 25th staging of the Kilkenny Senior Hurling Championship since its establishment by the Kilkenny County Board.

On 28 March 1914, Johnstown won the championship after a 3–01 to 0–00 defeat of Erin's Own in the final. This was their first championship title.

== Results ==
=== Final ===
28 March 1914 Final	Johnstown	3-01 - 0-00	Erin's Own	St. James' Park
