= David Quirke (hurler) =

Irish hurler

Personal information
- Native name: Daithí Ó Coirc (Irish)
- Born: 11 July 1970 (age 56) Midleton, County Cork, Ireland
- Occupation: Director/Owner at Audi Cork/Blackwater Motors
- Height: 5 ft 11 in (180 cm)

Sport
- Sport: Hurling
- Position: Centre-back
Club
- Years: Club
- Midleton
Club titles
- Cork titles: 2 1987 and 1991
- All-Ireland Titles: 1988
College
- Years: College
- Harty Cup 1988
Inter-county*
Years	County	Apps (scores)
1990-1996	Cork	9 (0-2)
Inter-county titles
- Munster titles: 1
- All-Irelands: 1
- NHL: 0
- All Stars: 0
- *Inter County team apps and scores correct as of 19:52, 5 August 2014.

David Quirke (born 11 July 1970) is an Irish retired hurler who played as a centre-back for the Cork senior team.

Born in Midleton, County Cork, Quirke first played competitive hurling during his schooling at Midleton CBS Secondary School. He arrived on the inter-county scene at the age of seventeen when he first linked up with the Cork minor team before later joining the under-21 side. He made his senior debut during the 1990 championship. Quirke went on to become a regular member of the team for a number of years, winning one All-Ireland medal and one Munster medal.

At club level Quirke is a one-time championship medallist with Midleton.

Throughout his career Quirke made nine championship appearances for Cork. He retired from inter-county hurling following the conclusion of the 1996 championship. Following his retirement Quirke became Captain of Fota Island Golf Club 2014 the year the Irish Open was hosted by Fota Island Golf Club. He is currently owner/shareholder/Director of the Cork Based Blackwater Motors/ Audi Cork Group.

== Playing career ==
=== Club ===
In 1987 Quirke was still eligible for the minor grade when he joined the Midleton senior team. He was an unused substitute that year as Midleton defeated Na Piarsaigh by 2-12 to 0-15 to win the championship. He later won a Munster medal as a non-playing substitute following Midleton's narrow 1-12 to 1-11 defeat of Cappawhite. On 17 March 1988 Midleton faced Athenry in the All-Ireland decider and a close game developed. Two early goals by Kevin Hennessy and a kicked goal by Colm O'Neill gave Midleton a 3–8 to 0–9 victory and gave Quirke, who was once again a non-playing substitute, an All-Ireland Senior Club Hurling Championship medal.

Quirke was a regular member of the starting fifteen by 1991 when Midleton reached the championship decider once again. A 1-17 to 1-8 defeat of Glen Rovers gave Quirke a championship medal on the field of play and his second overall.

=== Inter-county ===
Quirke first played for Cork as a member of the minor team on 19 May 1987 in a 2-14 t0 2-9 Munster semi-final defeat of Clare. Cork's championship campaign later ended at the hands of Tipperary.

In 1988 Quirke was still eligible for the minor grade and won a Munster medal following a 5-7 to 1-2 trouncing of Tipperary. Cork later qualified for the All-Ireland final against Kilkenny on 4 September 1988. The Cats were too strong on that occasion as Cork were defeated by 3-13 to 0-12.

Three years later Quirke was a regular member of the under-21 team. He won a Munster medal that year as Cork defeated Limerick by 0-17 to 1-7.

Quirke made his senior championship debut for Cork on 20 May 1990 in a 3-17 to 3-7 Munster quarter-final defeat of Kerry. He later won a Munster medal following a 4-16 to 2-14 defeat of Tipperary. The subsequent All-Ireland final on 2 September 1990 pitted Cork against Galway for the second time in four years, however, Quirke was unlucky to be dropped from the starting fifteen. Galway were once again the red-hot favourites and justified this tag by going seven points ahead in the opening thirty-five minutes thanks to a masterful display by Joe Cooney. Cork fought back with an equally expert display by captain Tomás Mulcahy. The game was effectively decided on an incident which occurred midway through the second half when Cork goalkeeper Ger Cunningham blocked a point-blank shot from Martin Naughton with his nose. The umpires gave no 65-metre free, even though he clearly deflected it out wide. Cork went on to win a high-scoring and open game of hurling by 5–15 to 2–21. In spite of starting the game on the bench Quirke was introduced as a substitute and won an All-Ireland medal on the field of play.

Over the next few years Quirke was on and off the starting fifteen. He won a second Munster medal as a non-playing substitute in 1992 following a 1-22 to 3-11 of Limerick.

Quirke played his last game for Cork on 26 May 1996 in a shock 3-18 to 1-8 Munster quarter-final home defeat by Limerick.

== Honours ==
=== Team ===
Midleton

- All-Ireland Senior Club Hurling Championship (1): 1988 (sub)
- Munster Senior Club Hurling Championship (1): 1987
- Cork Senior Hurling Championship (2): 1987 (sub), 1991

Cork

- All-Ireland Senior Hurling Championship (1): 1990
- Munster Senior Hurling Championship (2): 1990, 1992 (sub)
- Munster Under-21 Hurling Championship (1): 1991
- Munster Minor Hurling Championship (1): 1988
