= Brendan O'Sullivan =

Brendan O'Sullivan may refer to:

- Brendan O'Sullivan (Kerry hurler), hurler with Kerry and Ballyheigue
- Brendan O'Sullivan (Cork hurler) (born 1965), Irish hurler
- Brendan Jer O'Sullivan (born 1979), Irish Gaelic footballer
