= Kieran McGuckin =

Irish hurler

Personal information
- Native name: Ciarán Mac Eocháin (Irish)
- Born: 12 September 1967 (age 59) Ballyvolane, Cork, Ireland
- Height: 5 ft 9 in (175 cm)

Sport
- Sport: Hurling
- Position: Left wing-back
Club
- Years: Club
- Glen Rovers
Club titles
- Cork titles: 1
Inter-county*
Years	County	Apps (scores)
1990-1996	Cork	8 (0-10)
Inter-county titles
- Munster titles: 2
- All-Irelands: 1
- NHL: 1
- All Stars: 0
- *Inter County team apps and scores correct as of 19:03, 4 July 2015.

Kieran McGuckin (born 12 September 1967) is an Irish retired hurler who played as a left wing-back for the Cork senior team.

Born in Ballyvolane, Cork, McGuckin first played competitive hurling during his schooling at the North Monastery. He arrived on the inter-county scene at the age of seventeen when he first linked up with the Cork minor team before later joining the under-21 side. He made his senior hurling debut during the 1990 championship. McGuckin immediately became a regular member of the starting fifteen and won one All-Ireland medal and two Munster Senior Hurling Championship medals in 1990 and 1992. He also captained that 1990 team to win the Munster championship. He was nominated for an All Star at left half back in that year.

At club level, McGuckin is a one-time championship medallist with Glen Rovers.

Throughout his career, McGuckin made 8 championship appearances. His retirement came following the conclusion of the 1996 championship.

== Playing career ==
=== College ===
During his schooling at the North Monastery, McGuckin established himself as a member of the senior hurling team. In 1985 he won a Harty Cup medal following a 5–6 to 1–7 defeat of St. Flannan's College. On 19 May 1985 the North Mon faced St. Brendan's Community School in the All-Ireland decider, having drawn a week earlier. A 4–11 to 1–5 victory gave McGuckin an All-Ireland medal.

=== Club ===
McGuckin won county medals at all grades with Glen Rovers. He made his senior debut at the age of 16 in 1983. After losing the 1988 championship decider to St. Finbarr's, the Glen qualified for the final again in 1989. A high-scoring 4–15 to 3–13 defeat of Sarsfields gave McGuckin a Cork Senior Hurling Championship medal.

=== Inter-county ===
McGuckin first played for Cork as a member of the minor team on 15 May 1985. He scored a point from left wing-back in Cork's 1–12 to 1-8 Munster semi-final defeat of Limerick. A subsequent 1–13 to 1–8 defeat of Tipperary secured a Munster Minor Hurling Championship medal for McGuckin. Wexford provided the opposition in the subsequent All-Ireland decider on 1 September 1985. A 3–10 to 0–12 victory gave McGuckin an All-Ireland Minor Hurling Championship medal.

By 1988, McGuckin was a member of the Cork under-21 team. He won a Munster medal that year following a 4–12 to 1–7 defeat of Limerick. He also won an All Ireland u-21 medal in 1988.

McGuckin made his senior championship debut as captain of the team on 20 May 1990 in a 3–17 to 3-7 Munster quarter-final defeat of Kerry. He later won a Munster medal following a 4–16 to 2–14 defeat of reigning champions Tipperary. The subsequent All-Ireland final on 2 September 1990 pitted Cork against Galway for the second time in four years. Galway were the favourites and went seven points ahead in the opening thirty-five minutes thanks to play from Joe Cooney. Cork fought back, aided by captain Tomás Mulcahy. A key moment in the game occurred when Cork goalkeeper Ger Cunningham blocked a point-blank shot from Martin Naughton with his nose. The umpires gave no 65-metre free, even though he had deflected it out wide. Cork went on to win by 5–15 to 2–21. The victory gave McGuckin an All-Ireland Senior Hurling Championship medal.

== Honours ==
=== Player ===
North Monastery

- Croke Cup (1): 1985
- Harty Cup (1): 1985

Glen Rovers

- Cork Senior Hurling Championship (1): 1989

Cork

- All-Ireland Senior Hurling Championship (1): 1986, 1990
- Munster Senior Hurling Championship (2): 1990-1992
- Munster Under-21 Hurling Championship (1):
- All Ireland Under 21 Hurling Championship (1)
- All-Ireland Minor Hurling Championship (1): 1985
- Munster Minor Hurling Championship (1): 1985

Sporting positions
Preceded by Ger Cunningham	Cork Senior Hurling Captain; 1990	Succeeded by Tomás Mulcahy
