= Argideen Rangers GAA =

Gaelic games club in County Cork, Ireland

Argideen Rangers
- Raonaithe Airgidín
- Founded: 1892
- County: Cork
- Colours
- Grounds: Timoleague Grounds
- Coordinates: 51°38′19″N 8°46′29″W

Playing kits
Standard colours

Argideen Rangers GAA Club is a Gaelic Athletic Association club in Timoleague, County Cork, Ireland. The club is affiliated to the Carbery Board and fields teams in both hurling and Gaelic football.

== History ==
Located in the village of Timoleague, about 10km from Clonakilty, Argideen Rangers GAA Club was established in 1892. That year, a Gaelic football team under the name St Molaga's was entered in the local championship. The club was strong in the early years of the GAA, primarily due to the arrival of the Cork, Bandon and South Coast Railway in the area and the work of John Burke, a railway employee based in Timoleague. Argideen Rangers has spent the majority of its existence operating in the junior grade and, like many other clubs, has also seen various periods of decline and inactivity.

The reorganisation of the Argideen Rangers underage section of the club in 1979 yielded success, with divisional under-14 and under-16 titles being won in both codes that year. Many of the players on these teams were part of the club's first big hurling breakthrough when, in 1985, the South West JBHC title was won.

The 10-year period between 1993 and 2003 saw Argideen Rangers win three South West JAHC titles, as well as a South West JAFC title. The club also won the Cork JAHC in 1996, following a 3–09 to 0–11 win over Fr O'Neill's in the final. A restructuring of the Cork hurling championship system resulted in Argideen Rangers being promoted to the Cork IHC in 2004. They won the Cork IHC title two years later, after beating Nemo Rangers in a final replay. In 2012, a lack of numbers at underage level necessitated an amalgamation with neighbouring club Barryroe to form Ibane Gaels.

== Honours ==
- Cork Intermediate Hurling Championship (1): 2005
- Cork Junior A Hurling Championship (1): 1996
- West Cork Junior A Hurling Championship (3): 1993, 1996, 2003
- West Cork Junior A Football Championship (1): 1994
- Cork Junior B Football Championship (4): 1993, 2001, 2008, 2017
- West Cork Junior B Football Championship (4): 1967, 1988, 1993, 2001
- West Cork Junior B Hurling Championship (1): 1985
- West Cork Junior C Hurling Championship (1): 2014
- Cork Under-21 B Football Championship(1): 2016 (as Ibane Gaels)
- West Cork Under-21 Hurling Championship (2): 1987, 2007

== Notable players ==
- Mark Foley: All-Ireland SHC–winner (1990)
- Barry Harte: All-Ireland JHC–winner (1994)
