= Michael Coleman (hurler) =

Irish hurler (1963–2025)

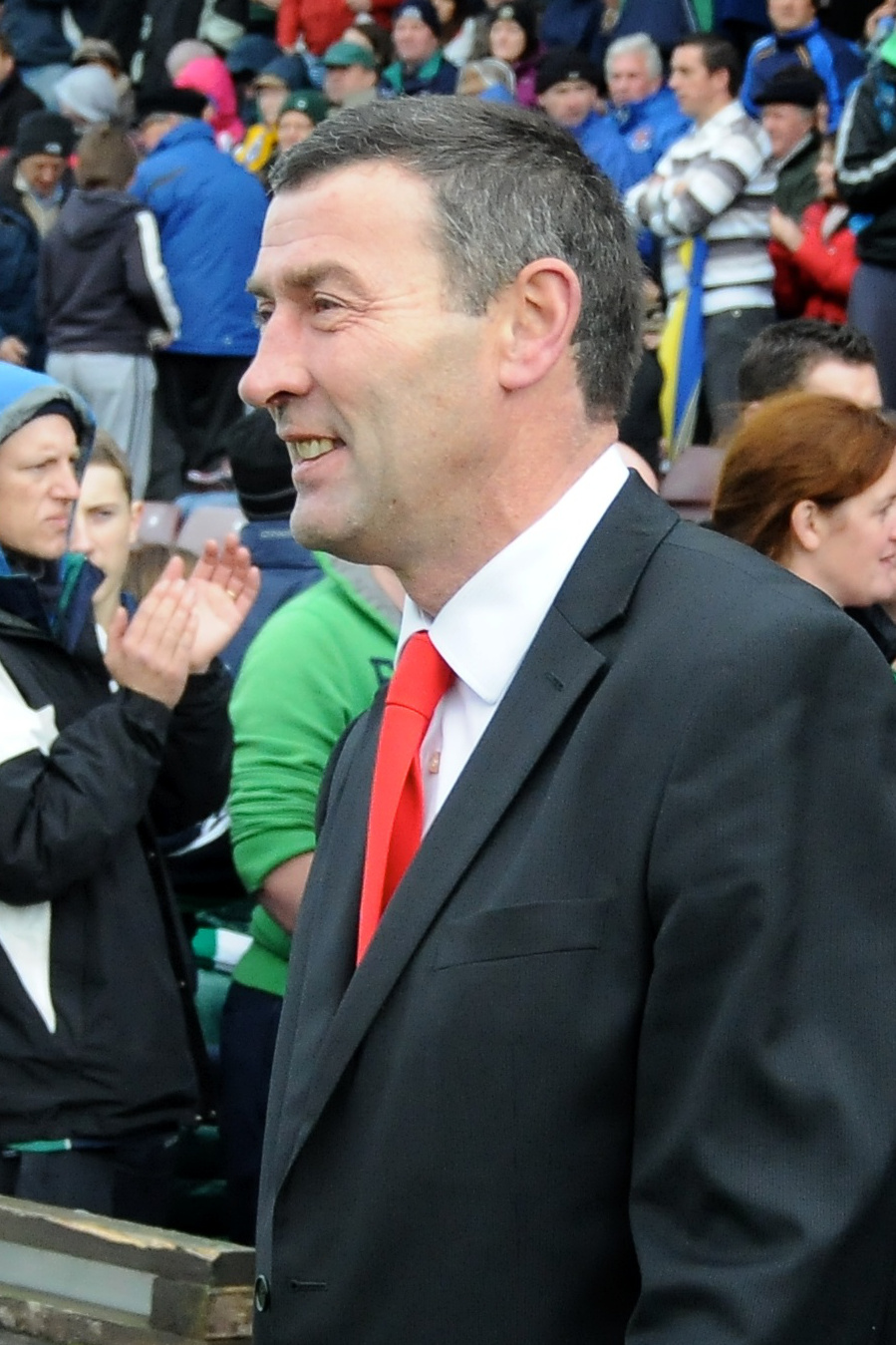

Personal information
- Native name: Mícheál Ó Colmáin (Irish)
- Born: 8 August 1963 Abbeyknockmoy, County Galway, Ireland
- Died: 7 February 2025 (aged 61) Abbeyknockmoy, County Galway, Ireland
- Occupation: Financial broker
- Height: 6 ft 1 in (185 cm)

Sport
- Sport: Hurling
- Position: Midfield
Club
- Years: Club
- 1981–2004: Abbeyknockmoy
Club titles
- Galway titles: 1
College
- Years: College
- 1981–1986: University College Galway
College titles
- Fitzgibbon titles: 0
Inter-county
- Years: County
- 1984–1999: Galway
Inter-county titles
- Connacht titles: 4
- All-Irelands: 1
- NHL: 3
- All Stars: 3

Michael Coleman (8 August 1963 – 7 February 2025) was an Irish hurler who played for the Abbeyknockmoy club and at senior level for the Galway county team. With Galway he won the All-Ireland Senior Hurling Championship in 1988.

== Early life ==
Born and raised in Abbeyknockmoy, County Galway, Coleman attended St Jarlath's College in Tuam. Although regarded as a college more famous for Gaelic football, he played hurling at all levels during his schooldays. Coleman later studied at University College Galway and was a two-time Fitzgibbon Cup runner-up.

== Club career ==
Coleman first played for Abbeyknockmoy at adult level in 1981. He scored three points from centre-back when Abbeyknockmoy beat Craughwell by 1-09 to 1-02 to claim the Galway IHC title in 1985. Three years later, Coleman was again at centre-back when Abbeyknockmoy reached the senior decider. He scored 1-02, including a penalty, as the club claimed their inaugural Galway SHC title after a one-point defeat of Athenry in a final replay.

== Inter-county career ==
Coleman first played for Galway at inter-county level as a member of the minor team. He came on as a substitute and scored a point in Galway's 1-20 to 3-09 defeat by Kilkenny in the 1981 All-Ireland minor final. Coleman immediately progressed to Galway's under-21 team and was an unused substitute when Cork beat Galway by a single point in the 1982 All-Ireland under-21 final. He broke onto the starting fifteen a year later and claimed an All-Ireland U21HC medal after a 0-12 to 1-06 defeat of Tipperary in that year's All-Ireland under-21 final.

Coleman was still eligible for the under-21 grade when he was drafted onto Galway's junior team. He lost back-to-back All-Ireland finals in that grade, first to Cork in 1983 and, later, to Kilkenny in 1984. By that stage, Coleman had already joined the senior team, after being added to the panel for the National Hurling League in March 1984.

After a period away from the team, Coleman was recalled and won a National Hurling League title in 1987 following Galway's 3-12 to 3-10 win over Clare in the final. He was later released from the panel and was a spectator when Galway beat Kilkenny to win that year's All-Ireland SHC title. Coleman was again recalled to the team and was selected at midfield for the 1988 All-Ireland final against Tipperary. He ended the game with an All-Ireland SHC winners' medal following Galway's 1-15 to 0-14 victory.

Coleman collected his first All Star in 1989, before claiming a second consecutive award in 1990. He had earlier lined out at midfield in Galway's 5-15 to 2-21 defeat by Cork in the 1990 All-Ireland final. Coleman made his third All-Ireland final appearance in 1993, however, he once again ended on the losing side after a 2-17 to 1-15 defeat by Kilkenny.

After winning the first of four consecutive Connacht SHC medals and being presented with a third All Star in 1995, Coleman was appointed team captain in 1996. He claimed a third National League title that year. Coleman stepped away from the team at the end of the 1998 season, however, he was recalled a year later for an All-Ireland quarter-final defeat by Clare.

== Inter-provincial career ==
Coleman's performances at inter-county level resulted in his selection for the Connacht team. He won his first Railway Cup medal in 1989, following a 4-16 to 3-17 defeat of Munster in the final. Coleman added a second winners' medal to his collection two years later when Munster were once again beaten. Coleman won a third Railway Cup title in 1994, when he captained the team to a one-point win over Leinster.

== Coaching career ==
Coleman spent a number of years as coach and selector with the Leitrim senior hurling team. He was part of the management team in 2019 when Leitrim won the Lory Meagher Cup for the first time following a 2–23 to 2–22 win over Lancashire in the final.

== Death ==
Coleman died on 7 February 2025, at the age of 61, following an accident at his home. His death happened while he was at work clearing damage caused by Storm Éowyn. Survived by his wife, son and daughter, Coleman's funeral was held at Brooklodge's Church of the Immaculate Conception on 13 February.

== Honours ==
=== Player ===
Abbeyknockmoy

- Galway Senior Hurling Championship: 1988
- Galway Intermediate Hurling Championship: 1985

Galway

- All-Ireland Senior Hurling Championship: 1988
- Connacht Senior Hurling Championship: 1995, 1996 (c), 1997, 1998
- National Hurling League: 1986–87, 1988–89, 1995–96 (c)
- All-Ireland Under-21 Hurling Championship: 1983

Connacht

- Railway Cup: 1989, 1991, 1994 (c)

Individual

- All-Stars (3): 1989, 1990, 1995

=== Management ===
Leitrim

- Lory Meagher Cup: 2019
