= Conor Whelan =

Galway hurler (born 1996)

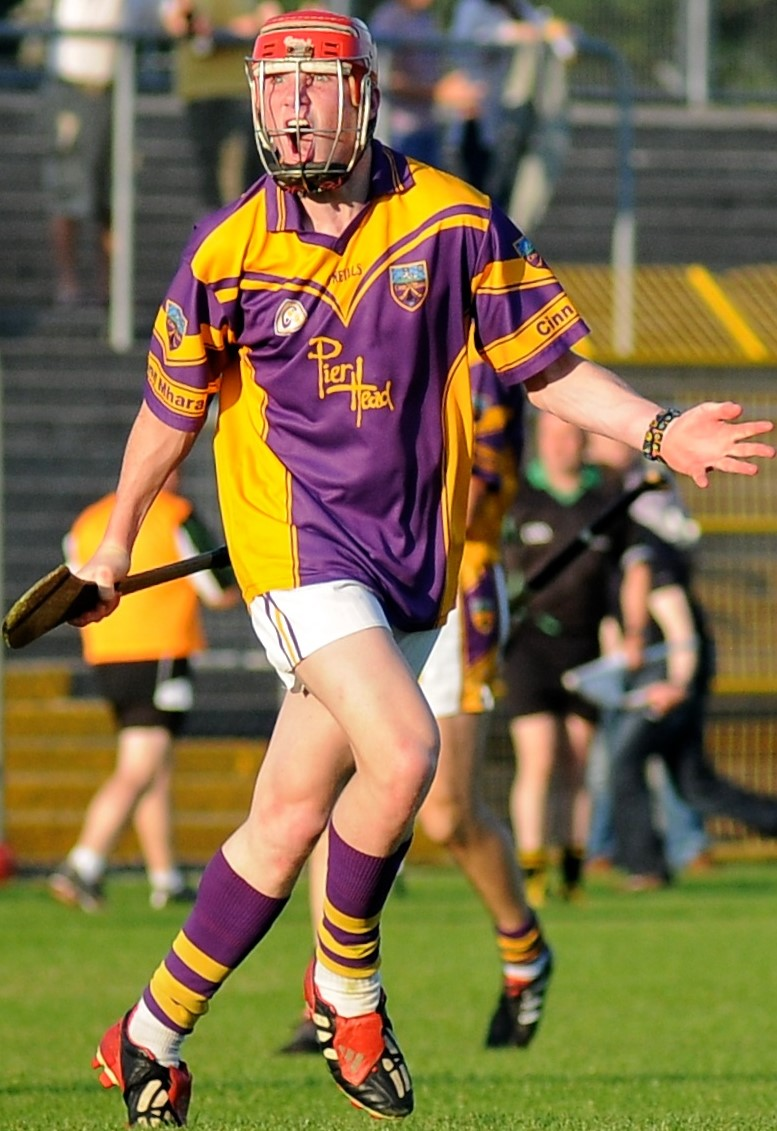

Personal information
- Native name: Conchúir Ó Faoláin (Irish)
- Nickname: Whelo
- Born: 31 October 1996 (age 30) Kinvara, County Galway, Ireland
- Occupations: Head of Well-Being & Business Development at Castle Group
- Height: 1.81 m (5 ft 11 in)

Sport
- Sport: Hurling
- Position: Right corner-forward
Club
- Years: Club
- 2013–: Kinvara
Club titles
- Galway titles: 0
College
- Years: College
- University of Galway
College titles
- Fitzgibbon titles: 0
Inter-county*
| Years | County | Apps (scores) |
| 2015– | Galway | 58 (16–126) |
Inter-county titles
- Leinster titles: 3
- All-Irelands: 1
- NHL: 2
- All Stars: 2
- *Inter County team apps and scores correct as of match played 21 June 2025.

Conor Whelan (born 31 October 1996) is an Irish hurler who plays as a right corner forward for club side Kinvara and at senior level for the Galway county team.

== Playing career ==
=== University of Galway ===
As a student at the University of Galway, Whelan has been a regular player on the university's senior hurling team in the Fitzgibbon Cup.

=== Kinvara ===
Whelan joined the Kinvara club at a young age and played in all grades at juvenile and underage levels before joining the club's intermediate team.

=== Galway ===
==== Minor and under-21 ====
Whelan first played for Galway as a member of the minor hurling team on 28 July 2013. He made his first appearance in a 1–19 to 0-13 All-Ireland quarter-final defeat of Laois. On 8 September 2013, Whelan was at right corner-forward in Galway's 1–21 to 0–16 defeat by Waterford in the All-Ireland final at Croke Park.

Whelan's second and final season with the Galway minor team ended with a 1–27 to 2-09 All-Ireland semi-final defeat by Limerick on 17 August 2014.

As a member of the Galway under-21 hurling team, Whelan made his first appearance on 22 August 2015 in a 1–20 to 0-17 All-Ireland semi-final defeat by Limerick.

On 10 September 2016, Whelan scored two points in a 5–15 to 0–14 defeat by Waterford in the All-Ireland final.

Whelan ended the 2017 championship by being named on the Bord Gáis Energy Team of the Year.

==== Intermediate ====
On 1 July 2015, Whelan made his first appearance for the Galway intermediate hurling team. He later won a Leinster Championship medal following Galway's 1–20 to 0–11 defeat of Wexford in the final.

==== Senior ====
Whelan made his debut for the Galway senior team on 26 July 2015, scoring 1-02 from play in a 2–28 to 0-22 All-Ireland quarter-final defeat of Cork. On 6 September 2015, Whelan scored two points from right wing-forward in a 1–22 to 1–18 defeat by Kilkenny in the All-Ireland final.

On 23 April 2017, Whelan scored five points from play when Galway defeated Tipperary by 3–21 to 0–14 to win the National Hurling League. Later that season he won his first Leinster Championship medal after Galway's 0–29 to 1–17 defeat of Wexford in the final. On 3 September 2017, Whelan started for Galway at right corner-forward when they won their first All-Ireland in 29 years after a 0–26 to 2–17 defeat of Waterford in the final. He ended the season by winning an All-Star award as well as being named All Stars Young Hurler of the Year.

On 8 July 2018, Whelan won a second successive Leinster Championship medal following Galway's 1–28 to 3–15 defeat of Kilkenny in the final. On 19 August 2018, he scored a goal from right corner-forward in Galway's 3–16 to 2-18 All-Ireland final defeat by Limerick.

== Career statistics ==
As of match played 21 June 2025

| Team | Year | National League | | | Leinstser | | All-Ireland | | Total | |
| Team | Year | Division | Apps | Score | Apps | Score | Apps | Score | Apps | Score |
|---|---|---|---|---|---|---|---|---|---|---|
| Galway | 2015 | Division 1A | 0 | 0-00 | 0 | 0-00 | 3 | 1-06 | 3 | 1-06 |
| Galway | 2016 | Division 1A | 6 | 0-06 | 3 | 1-05 | 2 | 0-02 | 11 | 1-13 |
| Galway | 2017 | Division 1B | 7 | 3-12 | 3 | 0-12 | 2 | 0-05 | 12 | 3-29 |
| Galway | 2018 | Division 1B | 5 | 2-05 | 6 | 2-13 | 3 | 1-06 | 14 | 5-24 |
| Galway | 2019 | Division 1B | 5 | 1-07 | 4 | 1-10 | — | | 9 | 2-17 |
| Galway | 2020 | Division 1A | 5 | 3-06 | 2 | 0-06 | 1 | 0-01 | 8 | 3-13 |
| Galway | 2021 | Division 1A | 5 | 2-11 | 1 | 1-02 | 1 | 0-03 | 7 | 3-16 |
| Galway | 2022 | Division 1A | 4 | 0-07 | 5 | 1-13 | 2 | 1-04 | 11 | 2-24 |
| Galway | 2023 | Division 1A | 4 | 1-04 | 6 | 6-11 | 2 | 1-07 | 12 | 8-22 |
| Galway | 2024 | | | | 5 | 0-11 | — | | 5 | 0-11 |
| Galway | 2025 | | | | 6 | 0-08 | 1 | 0-01 | 7 | 0-09 |
| Total | | | 41 | 12-58 | 41 | 12-91 | 17 | 4-35 | 99 | 28-184 |

== Honours ==
Galway

- All-Ireland Senior Hurling Championship (1): 2017
- Leinster Senior Hurling Championship (3): 2017, 2018, 2026
- National Hurling League Division 1 (2): 2017, 2021
- Leinster Intermediate Hurling Championship (1): 2015

Club

- Galway Intermediate Hurling Championship (1): 2019

Awards

- All Stars Young Hurler of the Year (1): 2017
- GAA GPA All Stars Awards (2): 2017, 2023
- The Sunday Game Team of the Year (2): 2017, 2023
