= 1988 Railway Cup Hurling Championship =

Irish hurling competition

- Dates: 15 October 1988 – 16 October 1988
- Teams: 4
- Champions: Leinster (19th title)
- Runners-up: Connacht

Tournament statistics
- Matches played: 4
- Goals scored: 18 (4.5 per match)
- Points scored: 100 (25 per match)
- Top scorer(s): Nicky English (2-10)

The 1988 Railway Cup Hurling Championship was the 62nd staging of the Railway Cup since its establishment by the Gaelic Athletic Association in 1927. The cup began on 15 October 1988 and ended on 16 October 1988.

Connacht were the defending champions.

On 16 October 1988, Leinster won the cup after a 2-14 to 1-12 defeat of Connacht in the final at Casement Park. This was their 19th Railway Cup title overall and their first title since 1979.

== Results ==
=== Semi-finals ===
15 October 1988 Semi-final	Connacht	4-13 - 2-11	Munster	Corrigan Park, Belfast
	E Dervan 2-1, A Cunningham 1-2, M Naughton 0-4, M Connolly 0-4, J Commins 1-0, J Cooney 0-1, P Boland 0-1.		N English 1-3, S Ahearne 1-0, D O'Connell 0-3, D Byrne 0-2, M Guilfoyle 0-1, B Finn 0-1, J Kennedy 0-1.

15 October 1988 Semi-final	Ulster	1-08 - 1-13	Leinster	Corrigan Park, Belfast
	D Donnelly 1-2, D McNaughton 0-3, B Donnelly 0-2, C Barr 0-1.		M Corrigan 0-5, L Ryan 1-1, B McMahon 0-4, S Dalton 0-1, J O'Connor 0-1, D Kilcoyne 0-1.

=== Shield final ===
16 October 1988 Shield final	Ulster	0-12 - 7-17	Munster	Casement Park, Belfast
	D Donnelly 0-4, P McKillen 0-3, B Donnelly 0-2, D McNaughton 0-2, B Laverty 0-1.		N English 1-7, S Ahearne 2-1, T Guilfoyle 1-3, G Fitzgerald 1-1, J Kennedy 1-1, C Bonnar 1-0, S Fitzgibbon 0-1, B Finn 0-1, P Delaney 0-1, J Heffernan 0-1.	Referee: S Brennan (Galway)

=== Final ===
16 October 1988 Final	Leinster	2-14 - 1-12	Connacht	Casement Park, Belfast
	M Corrigan 0-7, PJ Cuddy 2-0, C Heffernan 0-3, B McMahon 0-2, S Dalton 0-1, V Teehan 0-1.		M Connoly 0-7, A Cunningham 1-0, M Naughton 0-2, M McGrath 0-2, P Malone 0-1.	Referee: T Murray (Limerick)

== Scoring statistics ==
Top scorers overall

Rank	Player	Club	Tally	Total	Matches	Average
1	Nicky English	Munster	2-10	16	2	8.00
2	Mark Corrigan	Leinster	0-12	12	2	6.00
3	Michael Connolly	Connacht	0-11	11	2	5.50

== Bibliography ==
- Donegan, Des, The Complete Handbook of Gaelic Games (DBA Publications Limited, 2005).
