= Kinvara GAA =

Gaelic sports club in County Galway, Ireland

- Founded: 1889
- County: Galway
- Colours: Purple and Gold
- Grounds: Kinvara GAA Ground
- Coordinates: 53°08′11″N 8°57′11″W

Playing kits
Standard colours

Senior Club Championships
	All Ireland	Connacht champions	Galway champions
Hurling:	0	0	0

Kinvara GAA is a Gaelic Athletic Association club located in the town of Kinvara in County Galway, Ireland. The club is almost exclusively concerned with hurling but also plays Gaelic Football at Junior level.

== History ==
The club was formed as Killoveragh GAA Club in 1889, which brought together the men of Kinvara, Dooras and Killina. The club later changed its name to Kinvara GAA Club. The 1970s will always be remembered for the Kinvara Senior hurling team reaching the County Final for the first time in 1979. They were defeated by a Castlegar team, backboned by the Connolly brothers.

The Kinvara Intermediate Hurling team who defeated Kilconieron on a scoreline of 1-10 to 0-12 to win the Galway Intermediate Hurling Championship In 2019.

== Honours ==
- Galway Senior Hurling Championship (0): (runner-up in 1979 and 2007)
- Galway Intermediate Hurling Championship (2): 1966, 2019
- Galway Junior Hurling Championship (2): 1959, 1975

== Notable players ==
- Gerry McInerney
- Colm Callanan
- Shane Kavanagh
- Conor Whelan- 2017 All-Stars Young Hurler of the Year
- Evan Deveney
- Robert Holian [scorer of a goal vs Kerry in the All Ireland Junior Football Final 2017 - Most noted that day for his Windmill celebration
