= 2005 Cork Intermediate Hurling Championship =

Irish hurling competition

- Dates: 1 May 2005 – 9 October 2005
- Teams: 16
- Sponsor: Evening Echo
- Champions: Argideen Rangers (1st title); Declan Crowley (captain); Barry Harte (manager)
- Runners-up: Nemo Rangers

Tournament statistics
- Matches played: 28
- Goals scored: 65 (2.32 per match)
- Points scored: 683 (24.39 per match)
- Top scorer(s): James Masters (3-35)

The 2005 Cork Intermediate Hurling Championship was the 96th staging of the Cork Intermediate Hurling Championship since its establishment by the Cork County Board in 1909. The draw for the opening round fixtures took place on 12 December 2004. The championship began on 1 May 2005 and ended on 9 October 2005.

On 9 October 2005, Argideen Rangers won the championship after a 2–08 to 1–08 defeat of Nemo Rangers in a final replay at Páirc Uí Rinn. It remains their only championship title in the grade.

Nemo Rangers' James Masters was the championship's top scorer with 3-35.

== Team changes ==
=== To Championship ===
Promoted from the Cork Junior A Hurling Championship

- Ballygarvan

=== From Championship ===
Promoted to the Cork Premier Intermediate Hurling Championship

- Watergrasshill

== Results ==
=== First round ===
1 May 2005 First round	Blackrock	1-09 - 1-13	Kanturk	Ballyanley
	D Gosnell 0-4, B Cashman 1-0, G Buckley 0-1, D Coakley 0-1, I Walsh 0-1, E Kiely 0-1, C O'Reilly 0-1.		F Browne 0-10, N Hayes 1-0, D Dwane 0-2, B Mullane 0-1.

1 May 2005 First round	Éire Óg	1-12 - 0-12	Ballygarvan	Páirc Uí Rinn
	T Cronin 0-6, J Spillane 1-0 (og), F Sheehan 0-3, J Crowley 0-3.		L Dillon 0-4, G White 0-2, S O'Leary 0-2, G Spillane 0-1, F Barry 0-1, K Ashman 0-1, S White 0-1.

1 May 2005 First round	Nemo Rangers	2-14 - 2-14	Ballymartle	Ballinhassig
	J Masters 0-10, D Niblock 1-0, P O'Shea 1-0, M Daly 0-2, W Morgan 0-2.		P Coughlan 1-2, B Dwyer 0-4, G Cummins 0-4, C Sheehan 1-0, B Corry 0-2, A McCarthy 0-1, M O'Mahony 0-1.

1 May 2005 First round	Bandon	0-10 - 1-07	Argideen Rangers	St. Mary's Park
	D Lucey 0-8, T Bambury 0-1, D Crowley 0-1.		M O'Callaghan 1-5, M Walsh 0-1, N Coomey 0-1.

2 May 2005 First round	Glen Rovers	0-07 - 0-12	Valley Rovers	Páirc Liam Mhic Cárthaigh
	G Foley 0-3, D Dorris 0-2, N Harte 0-1, A McCarthy 0-1.		R Butler 0-7, J Burke 0-2, J Young 0-1, P Lehane 0-1, E Collins 0-1.

8 May 2005 First round	Cobh	2-07 - 1-16	Dromina	Ballyhooley
	L Greaney 1-3, O Wilson 1-1, B Ahern 0-1, S Ryan 0-1.		M Buckley 1-1, A O'Shaughnessy 0-3, G Healy 0-3, K Hayes 0-3, P Gould 0-2, L Hayes 0-2, M Finn 0-1.

15 May 2005 First round replay	Nemo Rangers	3-14 - 0-13	Ballymartle	Ballinhassig
	A Cronin 1-2, W Morgan 0-5, C O'Shea 1-0, J Coogan 1-0, M Daly 0-2, W Morgan 0-2, D Niblock 0-1, M Cronin 0-1, P Morgan 0-1.		B Dwyer 0-4, R Dwyer 0-2, M O'Mahony 0-2, G Cummins 0-2, P Coughlan 0-1, A McCarthy 0-1, C Sheehan 0-1.

15 May 2005 First round replay	Bandon	0-13 - 1-13	Argideen Rangers	St. Mary's Park
	D Lucey 0-7, D Burke 0-2, D O'Donoghue 0-2, N O'Rourke 0-1, K Murphy 0-1.		M O'Callaghan 0-7, A O'Leary 1-1, M Walsh 0-2, B Hennessy 0-2, B Harte 0-1.

20 May 2005 First round	St. Vincent's	0-09 - 2-14	Kilbrittain	Páirc Liam Mhic Cárthaigh
	A Buckley 0-6, C Barry 0-1, C O'Callaghan 0-1, JP Murphy 0-1.		A Hayes 1-3, D O'Connell 0-6, E Sheehy 1-1, V O'Brien 0-3, P O'Mahony 0-1.

25 May 2005 First round	Milford	2-10 - 0-14	Carrigaline	Castletownroche
	E Dillon 0-6, M Savage 1-0, M O'Connell 1-0, J Cremin 0-2, R Geary 0-1, M Morrissey 0-1.		B O'Driscoll 0-5, G Cooney 0-2, R Keohane 0-2, N Murphy 0-2, B Irwin 0-1, S Corcoran 0-1, K O'Driscoll 0-1.

=== Second round ===
10 June 2005 Second round	Cobh	1-13 - 0-18	Bandon	Páirc Uí Rinn
	V O'Rourke 1-1, R Meaney 0-3, D Barrett 0-2, S Ryan 0-2, D Meaney 0-1, D O'Rourke 0-1, E Wilson 0-1, R O'Connell 0-1, J Griffin 0-1.		D Lucey 0-10, D O'Donoghue 0-4, D Burke 0-1, D Crowley 0-1, K Doyle 0-1, D Cronin 0-1.

15 June 2005 Second round	Carrigaline	0-12 - 2-15	Ballygarvan	Minane Bridge
	S Corcoran 0-3, B O'Driscoll 0-3, N Keohane 0-3, M Cuddihy 0-1, N Murphy 0-1, K O'Driscoll 0-1.		L Dillon 0-7, K Ashman 1-1, D Bouse 1-0, S O'Leary 0-2, S White 0-2, A Murphy 0-1, G White 0-1, W McCarthy 0-1.

17 June 2005 Second round	Glen Rovers	1-07 - 0-17	St. Vincent's	Church Road
	B Moylan 1-1, B Hackett 0-4, B Wall 0-1, L Galvin 0-1.		A Buckley 0-7, C Barry 0-3, S Ray 0-3, J Buckley 0-2, F Murphy 0-1, D O'Connor 0-1.

25 June 2005 Second round	Ballymartle	2-18 - 1-10	Blackrock	Páirc Uí Rinn
	B Dwyer 0-7, R Dwyer 1-3, P Coughlan 1-0, G Cummins 0-3, D Dwyer 0-1, B Corry 0-1, C Sheehan 0-1, B McCarthy 0-1, A McCarthy 0-1.		E Kelly 0-4, F Ryan 1-0, A Ryan 0-3, M Russell 0-2, G Buckley 0-1.

=== Third round ===
2 July 2005 Third round	Dromina	0-10 - 2-13	St. Vincent's	Kildorrery
	M Finn 0-3, G Healy 0-2, A O'Shaughnessy 0-2, J O'Shaughnessy 0-1, K Hayes 0-1, P Gould 0-1.		D O'Connor 2-1, A Buckley 0-7, C Barry 0-2, JP Murphy 0-1, S Ray 0-1, D O'Callaghan 0-1.

3 July 2005 Third round	Bandon	3-16 - 1-12	Valley Rovers	Kilbrittain
	D Crowley 1-3, D Lucey 0-6, D Burke 1-1, K Doyle 1-0, J Hickey 0-2, J Hurley 0-2, D Cronin 0-1, D O'Donoghue 0-1.		R Butler 1-7, J Burke 0-2, C Riordan 0-2, E Collins 0-1.

10 July 2005 Third round	Kanturk	0-11 - 0-16	Argideen Rangers	Coachford
	F Browne 0-4, A Nash 0-2, W Murphy 0-2, A Barry 0-1, B Mullane 0-1, I Brennan 0-1.		M O'Callaghan 0-7, M Walsh 0-4, T Crowley 0-2, B Hennessy 0-1, N Coomey 0-1, M O'Rourke 0-1.

17 July 2005 Third round	Kilbrittain	1-18 - 1-14	Ballygarvan	Páirc Uí Ríogáin
	D O'Connell 1-4, P O'Mahony 0-4, V O'Brien 0-3, E Sheehy 0-2, R Cashman 0-2, A Hayes 0-2, F Hickey 0-1.		L Dillon 0-7, G Spillane 1-3, M Sheehy 0-3, S O'Leary 0-1.

=== Quarter-finals ===
17 July 2005 Quarter-final	Nemo Rangers	2-16 - 2-11	Éire Óg	Páirc Liam Mhic Cárthaigh
	J Masters 0-10, M Cronin 1-0, A Cronin 1-0, D Niblock 0-3, W Morgan 0-1, P O'Shea 0-1, M Daly 0-1.		D Goulding 1-3, V Fahy 1-0, F Sheehan 0-2, T O'Leary 0-2, D Corkery 0-1, D O'Flynn 0-1, M Long 0-1, T Dineen 0-1.

17 July 2005 Quarter-final	Ballymartle	1-14 - 0-16	Milford	Croke Memorial Park
	G Cummins 0-5, B Corry 0-5, A McCarthy 1-1, P Coughlan 0-2, R Dwyer 0-1.		M Morrissey 0-6, J O'Brien 0-4, R Geary 0-4, J Cremin 0-1, M O'Connell 0-1.

13 August 2005 Quarter-final	Argideen Rangers	5-12 - 1-17	Bandon	Páirc Uí Mhurchú
	S O'Mahony 2-5, M O'Callaghan 1-4, J Dineen 1-0, B Hennessy 1-0, M Walsh 0-3.		D Lucey 0-8, J Hickey 1-1, D O'Donoghue 0-4, K Hurley 0-1, D Crowley 0-1, J O'Donovan 0-1, K Doyle 0-1.

1 September 2005 Quarter-final	Kilbrittain	1-16 - 3-10	St. Vincent's	Jack Barrett Park
	D O'Connell 0-7, D Ferriteur 1-0, R Cashman 0-3, A Hayes 0-2, E Sheehy 0-2, V O'Brien 0-2.		A Buckley 1-4, C Barry 1-2, J Buckley 1-0, D Ray 0-2, S Ray 0-1, D Duggan 0-1.

9 September 2005 Quarter-final replay	Kilbrittain	1-13 - 1-05	St. Vincent's	Páirc Uí Rinn
	A Hayes 1-2, E Sheehy 0-4, V O'Brien 0-2, F Hickey 0-2, R Cashman 0-1, O Sexton 0-1, D Murphy 0-1.		C Barry 1-1, S Ray 0-1, J Daly 0-1, D Ray 0-1, D Duggan 0-1.

=== Semi-finals ===
3 September 2005 Semi-final	Nemo Rangers	3-16 - 1-14	Ballymartle	Shanbally
	J Masters 3-11, R Murphy 0-1, W Morgan 0-1, A Cronin 0-1, D Niblock 0-1, M Daly 0-1.		G Cummins 0-7, A McCarthy 1-0, B Corry 0-3, R Dwyer 0-2, B Dwyer 0-1, C Sheehan 0-1.

18 September 2005 Semi-final	Argideen Rangers	0-12 - 0-12	Kilbrittain	Charlie Hurley Park
	M Walsh 0-4, M O'Callaghan 0-2, S O'Mahony 0-2, E Harrington 0-1, B Hennessy 0-1, A O'Leary 0-1, N Coomey 0-1.		R Cashman 0-4, E Sheehy 0-3, A Hayes 0-2, V O'Brien 0-1, F Hickey 0-1, D Murphy 0-1.

24 September 2005 Semi-final replay	Argideen Rangers	3-06 - 3-05	Kilbrittain	Charlie Hurley Park
	S O'Mahony 2-3, N Coomey 1-0, M Walsh 0-2, M O'Callaghan 0-1.		F Hickey 1-2, R Cashman 1-1, V O'Brien 0-1, A Hayes 0-1.

=== Finals ===
1 October 2005 Final	Argideen Rangers	1-08 - 0-11	Nemo Rangers	Páirc Uí Rinn
	S O'Mahony 0-4, T Crowley 1-0, M Walsh 0-2, M Crowley 0-2.		D Niblock 0-3, J Masters 0-3, J Coogan 0-3, W Morgan 0-1, M Cronin 0-1.

9 October 2005 Final replay	Argideen Rangers	2-08 - 1-08	Nemo Rangers	Páirc Uí Rinn
	M Walsh 2-3, S O'Mahony 0-2, M O'Callaghan 0-2, J Murphy 0-1.		M Morgan 1-0, W Morgan 0-2, D Niblock 0-2, A Cronin 0-1, J Coogan 0-1, R Murphy 0-1, J Masters 0-1.

== Championship statistics ==
=== Top scorers ===
Overall

Rank	Player	Club	Tally	Total	Matches	Average
1	James Masters	Nemo Rangers	3-35	44	5	8.80
2	Donagh Lucey	Bandon	0-39	39	5	7.80
3	Michael O'Callaghan	Argideen Rangers	2-28	34	8	4.25
4	Shane O'Mahony	Argideen Rangers	4-16	28	8	4.50
5	Michael Walsh	Argideen Rangers	2-21	27	8	4.37
5	Anthony Buckley	St. Vincent's	1-24	27	4	6.75
6	Ger Cummins	Ballymartle	0-21	21	5	4.20
7	Dan O'Connell	Kilbrittain	1-17	20	6	3.33
8	Alan Hayes	Kilbrittain	2-12	18	6	3.00
8	Liam Dillon	Ballygarvan	0-18	18	3	6.00

In a single game

Rank	Player	Club	Tally	Total	Opposition
1	James Masters	Nemo Rangers	3-11	20	Ballymartle
2	Shane O'Mahony	Argideen Rangers	2-05	11	Bandon
3	Richie Butler	Valley Rovers	1-07	10	Bandon
3	Fergus Browne	Kanturk	0-10	10	Blackrock
3	James Masters	Nemo Rangers	0-10	10	Ballymartle
3	Donagh Lucey	Bandon	0-10	10	Cobh
3	James Masters	Nemo Rangers	0-10	10	Ballymartle
4	Shane O'Mahony	Argideen Rangers	2-03	9	Kilbrittain
4	Michael Walsh	Argideen Rangers	2-03	9	Kilbrittain
5	Michael O'Callaghan	Argideen Rangers	1-05	8	Bandon
5	Donagh Lucey	Bandon	0-08	8	Argideen Rangers
5	Donagh Lucey	Bandon	0-08	8	Argideen Rangers
