= Brendan O'Sullivan (Cork hurler) =

Irish hurler

Personal information
- Native name: Breandán Ó Súilleabháin (Irish)
- Nickname: Brendy
- Born: 19 July 1965 (age 61) Innishannon, County Cork, Ireland
- Occupation: Electrician
- Height: 5 ft 11 in (180 cm)

Sport
- Sport: Hurling
- Position: Midfield
Clubs
- Years: Club
- Valley Rovers; Carrigdhoun
Club titles
- Cork titles: 0
Inter-county*
Years	County	Apps (scores)
1989-1992	Cork	9 (1-3)
Inter-county titles
- Munster titles: 1
- All-Irelands: 1
- NHL: 0
- All Stars: 0
- *Inter County team apps and scores correct as of 13:07, 8 July 2015.

Brendan O'Sullivan (born 19 July 1965) is an Irish retired hurler who played as a centre-back for the Cork senior team.

Born in Innishannon, County Cork, O'Sullivan first arrived on the inter-county scene at the age of sixteen when he first linked up with the Cork minor team before later joining the under-21 and junior sides. He joined the senior panel during the 1989 championship. O'Sullivan subsequently became a regular member of the starting fifteen and won one All-Ireland medal and one Munster medal.

At club level O'Sullivan won several championship medals in all grades with Valley Rovers. Throughout his career O'Sullivan made 9 championship appearances. His retirement came following the conclusion of the 1992 championship.

== Playing career ==
=== Club ===
After claiming the divisional junior championship title in 1988, O'Sullivan lined out with Valley Rovers against Newcestown in the subsequent championship decider. A narrow 0-11 to 1-6 victory gave O'Sullivan a championship medal in that grade.

Immediately after securing promotion to the intermediate grade, Valley Rovers qualified for the decider in 1989. After leaking two goals to Kilbrittain in a seven-minute, Rovers fought back to take an interval lead of 3-6 to 2-3. Three more goals following in the second half, with O'Sullivan winning another championship medal following a huge 6-12 to 3-5 victory.

=== Inter-county ===
O'Sullivan first played for Cork as a member of the minor team on 16 May 1981 in a 2-6 to 0-16 Munster semi-final defeat by Clare.

After two unsuccessful seasons as a minor O'Sullivan subsequently joined the Cork under-21 team. His two-year tenure in this grade also ended without success.

By this stage O'Sullivan had also joined the Cork junior team. In 1987 he won a Munster medal following a 2-16 to 1-9 defeat of Tipperary. On 25 July 1987 Cork faced Wexford in the All-Ireland decider. A 3-11 to 2-13 score line gave Cork the victory and secured an All-Ireland medal for O'Sullivan.

After being included as a substitute on the Cork senior team in 1989, O'Sullivan made his senior championship debut on 20 May 1990 in a 3-17 to 3-7 Munster quarter-final defeat of Kerry. He later won a Munster medal that year following a 4-16 to 2-14 defeat of Tipperary. The subsequent All-Ireland final on 2 September 1990 pitted Cork against Galway for the second time in four years. Galway were once again the red-hot favourites and justified this tag by going seven points ahead in the opening thirty-five minutes thanks to a masterful display by Joe Cooney. Cork fought back with an equally expert display by captain Tomás Mulcahy. The game was effectively decided on an incident which occurred midway through the second half when Cork goalkeeper Ger Cunningham blocked a point-blank shot from Martin Naughton with his nose. The umpires gave no 65-metre free, even though he clearly deflected it out wide. Cork went on to win a high-scoring and open game of hurling by 5–15 to 2–21 giving O'Sullivan an All-Ireland medal.

Cork surrendered their titles in 1991 and, after lining out in Cork's opening championship game against Kerry in 1992, O'Sullivan was subsequently dropped from the starting fifteen. He was a non-playing substitute as Cork claimed the Munster title following a 1-22 to 3-11 defeat of Limerick. O'Sullivan remained on the bench for Cork's subsequent All-Ireland final defeat by Kilkenny.

O'Sullivan ended his inter-county career as a member of the Cork junior team in 1995.

== Honours ==
=== Player ===
Valley Rovers

- Cork Intermediate Hurling Championship (1): 1989
- Cork Junior Hurling Championship (1): 1988

Cork

- All-Ireland Senior Hurling Championship (1): 1990
- Munster Senior Hurling Championship (2): 1990, 1992
- All-Ireland Junior Hurling Championship (1): 1987
- Munster Junior Hurling Championship (1): 1987
