= Mark Foley (Cork hurler) =

Irish hurler

Personal information
- Native name: Marc Ó Foghlú (Irish)
- Born: 6 July 1967 (age 59) Timoleague, County Cork, Ireland
- Occupation: Dentist
- Height: 6 ft 5 in (196 cm)

Sport
- Sport: Hurling
- Position: Centre-forward
Clubs
- Years: Club
- Argideen Rangers → Carbery
Club titles
- Cork titles: 1
College
- Years: College
- 1984-1989: University College Cork
College titles
- Fitzgibbon titles: 4
Inter-county*
Years	County	Apps (scores)
1987-1993	Cork	10 (5-14)
Inter-county titles
- Munster titles: 2
- All-Irelands: 1
- NHL: 1
- All Stars: 0
- *Inter County team apps and scores correct as of 17:19, 4 July 2015.

Mark Foley (born 6 July 1967) is an Irish former hurler. At club level, he played with Argideen Rangers and at inter-county level with the Cork senior hurling team. Foley is best remembered for scoring 2–07 in a man of the match performance in the 1990 Munster final.

== Early life ==
Born and raised in Timoleague, County Cork, Foley received his secondary education at St Finnbar's College in Cork. He played hurling at all levels during his time as a boarder, and has his first major success in 1982 when "Farna" won the Dean Ryan Cup after a 1-09 to 1-05 win over St Colman's College. Foley added a Dr Harty Cup title to his collection two years later, before later winning a Dr Croke Cup medal after a 1–15 to 0–08 defeat of St Kieran's College in the 1984 All-Ireland colleges final.

Foley subsequently studied dentistry at University College Cork (UCC), immediately joined the university's freshers' side and captained the team to the All-Ireland title in 1985. His time at UCC also saw him win four consecutive Fitzgibbon Cup titles between 1985 and 1989.

== Club career ==
After some success in the lower divisional grades with Argideen Rangers, Foley was a key member of the Carbery divisional team that reached a second successive championship decider in 1994. Midleton, one of the most successful teams of the previous decade, provided the opposition, however, a 3–12 to 3–6 victory gave Foley a Cork Senior Hurling Championship medal.

Two years later in 1996 Foley enjoyed major success with the Argideen Rangers club. After securing the divisional junior title Argideen subsequently faced Fr. O'Neill's in the county decider. A 3–9 to 0–11 victory, with Foley scoring 1–2, secured the championship.

== Inter-county career ==
Foley first played for Cork as a member of the minor team on 11 May 1983. He was introduced as a substitute in Cork's narrow 2–13 to 1-15 Munster semi-final defeat by Limerick.

After missing the 1984 championship due to a broken jaw, Foley was back the following year as a member of the starting fifteen. A 1–13 to 1–8 defeat of Tipperary secured a centenary year Munster medal. Wexford provided the opposition in the subsequent All-Ireland decider on 1 September 1985. A 3–10 to 0–12 victory gave him an All-Ireland Minor Hurling Championship medal.

In 1987 Foley was a late addition to the Cork junior team that faced Wexford in the All-Ireland decider on 25 July 1987. A narrow 3–11 to 2–13 victory gave Cork the victory and secured an All-Ireland medal for Foley.

The following Foley was at full-forward on the Cork under-21 team. He won a Munster medal that year following a 4–12 to 1–7 defeat of Limerick. Cork subsequently faced Kilkenny in the All-Ireland decider on 11 September 1988. Played in St. Brendan's Park, Birr to commemorate the centenary of the very first senior All-Ireland final being played there, Cork triumphed by 4–12 to 1–5, with Foley winning an All-Ireland Under-21 Hurling Championship medal.

After being included and subsequently omitted from the Cork senior panel in 1987 and 1988, Foley made his senior championship debut on 4 June 1989 in an 0-18 apiece Munster semi-final draw with Waterford.

By 1990 Foley was a regular member of the starting fifteen. He won his first Munster medal on that year after a man of the match performance in the decider. Foley's 2-7 contributed to the 4–16 to 2–14 defeat of reigning champions Tipperary. The subsequent All-Ireland final on 2 September 1990 pitted Cork against Galway for the second time in four years. Galway were once again the red-hot favourites and justified this tag by going seven points ahead in the opening thirty-five minutes thanks to a masterful display by Joe Cooney. Cork fought back with an equally expert display by captain Tomás Mulcahy. The game was effectively decided on an incident which occurred midway through the second half when Cork goalkeeper Ger Cunningham blocked a point-blank shot from Martin Naughton with his nose. The umpires gave no 65-metre free, even though he clearly deflected it out wide. Cork went on to win a high-scoring and open game of hurling by 5–15 to 2–21. The victory gave Foley an All-Ireland medal.

Cork surrendered their titles in 1991, however, Foley claimed his second Munster medal in 1992 following a 1–22 to 3-11 of Limerick. On 6 September 1992 Cork faced Kilkenny in the All-Ireland decider. At half-time Cork were two points ahead, however, two second-half goals by John Power and Michael "Titch" Phelan supplemented a first-half D. J. Carey penalty which gave Kilkenny a 3–10 to 1–12 victory.

Foley won a National Hurling League medal in 1993 following a 3–11 to 1–12 defeat of Wexford. He was dropped from the starting fifteen for the subsequent championship campaign, a move which effectively brought an end to his inter-county career, as he had started a very busy dental practice in Bantry in West Cork which was demanding huge amounts of his time.

== Inter-provincial career ==
Foley was picked for the Munster inter-provincial team in 1988. He was at left corner-forward in the 4–13 to 2-11 semi-final defeat by Connacht.

== Coaching career ==
In recent years Foley has been heavily involved as a mentor at various levels with Bantry Blues.

== Honours ==
St Finbarr's College

- Dr Croke Cup (1): 1984
- Dr Harty Cup (1): 1984
- Dean Ryan Cup (1): 1982

University College Cprk

- Fitzgibbon Cup (4): 1985, 1986, 1987, 1988
- All-Ireland Freshers' Hurling Championship (1): 1985 (c)

Argideen Rangers

- Cork Junior A Hurling Championship (1): 1996
- South West Junior A Hurling Championship (2): 1993, 1996
- South West Junior A Football Championship (2): 1994
- Cork Junior B Football Championship (1): 1993
- South West Junior B Football Championship (2): 1988, 1993
- South West Under-21 Hurling Championship (1): 1987

Carbery

- Cork Senior Hurling Championship (1): 1994

Cork

- All-Ireland Senior Hurling Championship (1): 1990
- Munster Senior Hurling Championship (2): 1990, 1992
- National Hurling League (1): 1992-93
- All-Ireland Junior Hurling Championship (1): 1987
- All-Ireland Under-21 Hurling Championship (1): 1988
- Munster Under-21 Hurling Championship (1): 1988
- All-Ireland Minor Hurling Championship (1): 1985
- Munster Minor Hurling Championship (1): 1985
