= Michael McGrath (hurler) =

Irish hurler

Personal information
- Native name: Mícheál Mac Craith (Irish)
- Nickname: Hopper
- Born: 30 June 1963 (age 63) Bullaun, County Galway
- Occupation: Salesman
- Height: 5 ft 10 in (178 cm)

Sport
- Position: Right wing-forward
Club
- Years: Club
- 1980s-1990s: Sarsfields
Club titles
- Galway titles: 5
- Connacht titles: 3
- All-Ireland Titles: 2
Inter-county
- Years: County
- 1980s-1990s: Galway
Inter-county titles
- All-Irelands: 2
- All Stars: 2
	Football	Hurling
League titles		2

Michael 'Hopper' McGrath (born 30 June 1963 in Bullaun, County Galway) is an Irish former sportsperson. He played hurling with his local club Sarsfields and was a member of the Galway senior inter-county team in the 1980s and 1990s.

McGrath played for the Galway hurling team that was crowned All-Ireland Senior Hurling Champions in 1987 (defeating Kilkenny) and 1988 (defeating Tipperary.)

McGrath was captain of the Sarsfields team when Sarsfields captured their second Galway Senior Hurling Championship title in 1989. On that occasion Sarsfields defeated Athenry in St.Brendans Park Loughrea, where the final score was Sarsfields 3-7, Athenry 1-8.

McGrath helped Sarsfields to win the club's third senior county title in 1992. On that occasion Sarsfields defeated Carnmore in the county final reply, where the final score was Sarsfields 1-14, Carnmore 1-5.

McGrath helped Sarsfields to retain the county title in 1993 (the club's fourth senior county title). On that occasion Sarsfields once again defeated Carnmore, where the final score was Sarsfields 1-10, Carnmore 0-4.

Following after the senior county title wins of 1992 and 1993, and McGrath with Sarsfields won his first All-Ireland Senior Club Championship medal in spring of 1993. McGrath and Sarsfields repeated the same feat in 1994 when the Sarsfields club becomes the first hurling club to retain their All-Ireland Senior Club championship title.

McGrath again played for Sarsfields when the club captured their fifth senior county title in 1995. On that occasion Sarsfields defeated Portumna where the final score was Sarsfields 0-17, Portumna 1-9.

McGrath played on the 1997 Sarsfields them when the club captured their sixth senior county title in 1997. On that occasion Sarsfields defeated Clarinbridge where the final score was Sarsfields 0-11, Clarinbridge 1-6.

McGrath is also the holder of two GAA GPA All Stars Awards awarded in 1987 and 1988.

Sporting positions
Preceded by Michael Coleman	Galway Senior Hurling Captain; 1993	Succeeded by Gerry McInerney
