= 1996 Cork Junior A Hurling Championship =

- Dates: 15 September – 3 November 1996
- Teams: 7
- Champions: Argideen Rangers (1st title); Tony Crowley (captain); Michael O'Brien (manager)
- Runners-up: Fr. O'Neill's; Dick O'Brien (captain); Denis Coughlan (manager)

Tournament statistics
- Matches played: 6
- Goals scored: 21 (3.5 per match)
- Points scored: 130 (21.67 per match)
- Top scorer(s): Michael Walsh (3-14)

The 1996 Cork Junior A Hurling Championship was the 99th staging of the Cork Junior A Hurling Championship since its establishment by the Cork County Board. The championship ran from 15 September to 3 November 1996.

The final was played on 3 November 1996 at Páirc Uí Chaoimh in Cork, between Argideen Rangers and Fr. O'Neill's, in what was their first ever meeting in the final. Argideen Rangers won the match by 3–09 to 0–11 to claim their first ever championship title.

Argideen Rangers' Michael Walsh was the championship's top scorer with 3–14.

== Qualification ==
Division	Championship	Champions
Avondhu	North Cork Junior A Hurling Championship	Fermoy
Carbery	South West Junior A Hurling Championship	Argideen Rangers
Carrigdhoun	South East Junior A Hurling Championship	Ballinhassig
Duhallow	Duhallow Junior A Hurling Championship	Meelin
Imokilly	East Cork Junior A Hurling Championship	Fr. O'Neill's
Muskerry	Mid Cork Junior A Hurling Championship	Aghabullogue
Seandún	City Junior A Hurling Championship	Glen Rovers

== Results ==
=== Quarter-finals ===
15 September 1996 Quarter-final	Argideen Rangers	3-14 - 3-10	Ballinora	Innishannon Grounds
	M Foley 1-4, M O'Callaghan 1-0, B Harte 1-0, M Walsh 0-3, T Crowley 0-3, J Crowley 0-2, N Cashman 0-1, M Harte 0-1.		P O'Mahony 0-7, M Murphy 2-0, J Murphy 1-1, D Lynch 0-1, P Cantillon 0-1.

22 September 1996 Quarter-final	Meelin	4-13 - 2-17	Glen Rovers	Páirc Uí Chaoimh
	N Brosnan 0-9, P Curtin 2-1, T O'Mahony 1-0, D Fitzpatrick 1-0, T Brosnan 0-2, G Angland 0-1.		P Barry 0-6, P Power 1-1, C Ring 1-1, G O'Connor 0-3, B McGuckin 0-3, F Wall 0-2, M Goggin 0-1.

13 October 1996 Quarter-final	Fr. O'Neill's	1-13 - 0-08	Fermoy	St. Catherine's Park
	L Swayne 0-9, G Holland 1-1, C O'Brien 0-2, R O'Neill 0-1.		B Hazlewood 0-3, L Mannix 0-2, S Crowley 0-1, D Slattery 0-1, B McCarthy 0-1.

=== Semi-finals ===
6 October 1996 Semi-final	Argideen Rangers	2-15 - 1-06	Meelin	Páirc Uí Chaoimh
	M Walsh 1-7, M Foley 1-2, J Crowley 0-2, B Harte 0-2, T Crowley 0-2.		N Brosnan 1-3, P Curtin 0-1, T Brosnan 0-1, K Brosnan 0-1.

20 October 1996 Semi-final	Fr. O'Neill's	2-06 - 0-08	Ballinhassig	Clonmult Memorial Park
	L Swayne 0-4, J O'Connell 1-0, C Millerick 1-0, D O'Neill 0-1, M Broderick 0-1.		D McCarthy 0-3, J O'Sullivan 0-2, S McCarthy 0-1, B Lombard 0-1.

=== Final ===
3 November 1996 Final	Argideen Rangers	3-09 - 0-11	Fr. O'Neill's	Páirc Uí Chaoimh
	M Walsh 2-4, M Foley 1-2, B Harte 0-2, T Crowley 0-1.		L Swayne 0-7, J O'Connell 0-3, G Holland 0-1.	Referee: D O'Leary

== Championship statistics ==
=== Top scorers ===
Overall

Rank	Player	County	Tally	Total	Matches	Average
1	Michael Walsh	Argideen Rangers	3-14	23	3	7.66
2	Luke Swayne	Fr. O'Neill's	0-20	20	3	6.66
3	Mark Foley	Argideen Rangers	3-08	17	3	5.66
4	Ned Brosnan	Meelin	1-12	15	2	7.50
5	Philip Curtin	Meelin	2-02	8	2	4.00

In a single game

Rank	Player	Club	Tally	Total	Opposition
1	Michael Walsh	Argideen Rangers	2-04	10	Fr. O'Neill's
1	Michael Walsh	Argideen Rangers	1-07	10	Meelin
3	Ned Brosnan	Meelin	0-09	9	Glen Rovers
3	Luke Swayne	Fr. O'Neill's	0-09	9	Fermoy
5	Philip Curtin	Meelin	2-01	7	Glen Rovers
5	Mark Foley	Argideen Rangers	1-04	7	Ballinora
5	Luke Swayne	Fr. O'Neill's	0-07	7	Fermoy
5	Paul O'Mahony	Ballinora	0-07	7	Argideen Rangers
9	Martin Murphy	Ballinora	2-00	6	Argideen Rangers
9	Ned Brosnan	Meelin	1-03	6	Argideen Rangers
9	Paddy Barry	Glen Rovers	0-06	6	Meelin
