= 1985 All-Ireland Minor Football Championship =

Gaelic football competition

Championship details

All-Ireland Champions
- Winning team: Mayo (6th win)

All-Ireland Finalists
- Losing team: Cork

Provincial Champions
- Munster: Cork
- Leinster: Meath
- Ulster: Donegal
- Connacht: Mayo

The 1985 All-Ireland Minor Football Championship was the 54th staging of the All-Ireland Minor Football Championship, the Gaelic Athletic Association's premier inter-county Gaelic football tournament for boys under the age of 18.

Dublin entered the championship as defending champions, however, they were defeated in the Leinster Championship.

On 22 September 1985, Mayo won the championship following a 3–3 to 0–9 defeat of Cork in the All-Ireland final. This was their sixth All-Ireland title overall and their first in seven championship seasons.

== Results ==
=== Connacht Minor Football Championship ===
Quarter-Final

June 1985 Quarter-Final	Leitrim	1-07 - 0-14	Sligo	Markievicz Park, Sligo

Semi-Finals

June 1985 Semi-Final	Galway	1-11 - 0-08	Roscommon	St Jarlath's Park, Tuam

June 1985 Semi-Final	Mayo	3-10 - 5-00	Sligo	McHale Park, Castlebar

Final

14 July 1985 Final	Mayo	0-06 - 1-01	Galway	Dr Hyde Park, Roscommon

=== Leinster Minor Football Championship ===
Preliminary Round

1985 Preliminary Round	Wicklow	2-02 - 1-11	Kildare	St Conleth's Park, Newbridge

1985 Preliminary Round	Carlow	2-09 - 2-09	Westmeath	Dr Cullen Park, Carlow

1985 Preliminary Round Replay	Carlow	1-09 - 0-11	Westmeath	Cusack Park, Mullingar

1985 Preliminary Round	Wexford	0-12 - 0-07	Longford	Pearse Park, Longford

1985 Preliminary Round	Kilkenny	0-04 - 1-21	Louth

Quarter-Finals

1985 Quarter-Final	Offaly	1-11 - 3-03	Louth	O'Connor Park, Tullamore

1985 Quarter-Final	Wexford	0-09 - 0-07	Dublin	Wexford Park, Wexford

1985 Quarter-Final	Meath	1-09 - 1-07	Kildare	Páirc Tailteann, Navan

1985 Quarter-Final	Laois	1-09 - 1-10	Carlow	Dr Cullen Park, Carlow

Semi-Finals

1985 Semi-Final	Meath	5-08 - 2-07	Carlow	O'Connor Park, Tullamore

1985 Semi-Final	Wexford	1-06 - 1-08	Offaly	O'Connor Park, Tullamore

Final

28 July 1985 Final	Meath	0-11 - 1-04	Offaly	Croke Park, Dublin

=== Munster Minor Football Championship ===
Quarter-Finals

May 1985 Quarter-Final	Kerry	3-06 - 1-05	Clare	Ballylongford

May 1985 Quarter-Final	Cork	2-08 - 1-08	Tipperary	Páirc Uí Chaoimh, Cork

Semi-Finals

June 1985 Semi-Final	Kerry	3-15 - 3-04	Limerick	Páirc na nGael, Askeaton

June 1985 Semi-Final	Cork	1-12 - 0-00	Waterford	Fraher Field, Dungarvan

Final

21 July 1985 Final	Cork	1-08 - 0-04	Kerry	Páirc Uí Chaoimh, Cork

=== Ulster Minor Football Championship ===
Preliminary Round

May 1985 Preliminary Round	Donegal	1-07 - 0-06	Down	MacCumhaill Park, Ballybofey

Quarter-Finals

June 1985 Quarter-Final	Cavan	0-10 - 0-03	Antrim	Breffni Park, Cavan

June 1985 Quarter-Final	Derry	2-11 - 0-09	Tyrone	Dean McGlinchey Park, Ballinascreen

June 1985 Quarter-Final	Armagh	3-07 - 0-02	Fermanagh	Athletic Grounds, Armagh

June 1985 Quarter-Final	Donegal	4-11 - 2-03	Monaghan	St Mary's Park, Castleblaney

Semi-Finals

June 1985 Semi-Final	Derry	1-01 - 2-05	Cavan	Athletic Grounds, Armagh

June 1985 Semi-Final	Donegal	1-08 - 0-08	Armagh	Breffni Park, Cavan

Final

21 July 1985 Final	Donegal	2-12 - 1-03	Cavan	St. Tiernach's Park, Clones

=== All-Ireland Minor Football Championship ===
Semi-Finals

11 August 1985 Semi-Final	Cork	2-05 - 0-09	Donegal	Croke Park, Dublin

18 August 1985 Semi-Final	Mayo	2-12 - 2-08	Meath	Croke Park, Dublin

Final

22 September 1985 Final	Mayo	3-03 - 0-09	Cork	Croke Park, Dublin
