= Brendan Lynskey =

Irish hurler

Personal information
- Native name: Breandán Ó Loinscigh (Irish)
- Born: 7 May 1956 (age 70) Meelick, County Galway
- Occupation: Technician
- Height: 6 ft 0 in (183 cm)

Sport
- Position: Centre-forward
Club
- Years: Club
- 1970s-1990s: Meelick-Eyrecourt
Club titles
- Galway titles: 0
Inter-county
Years	County	Apps (scores)
1980s-1990s	Galway	? (4-9)
Inter-county titles
- All-Irelands: 2
- All Stars: 1
	Football	Hurling
League titles		2

Brendan Lynskey (born 7 May 1956 in Meelick, County Galway) is an Irish former sportsperson. He played hurling with his local club Meelick-Eyrecourt and was a member of the Galway senior inter-county team in the 1980s and 1990s.
