= 1991 Railway Cup Hurling Championship =

Irish hurling competition

1991 Railway Cup
- Dates: 10 March 1991 – 7 April 1991
- Teams: 4
- Champions: Connacht (8th title)
- Runners-up: Munster

Tournament statistics
- Matches played: 3
- Goals scored: 6 (2 per match)
- Points scored: 71 (23.67 per match)
- Top scorer(s): Michael McGrath (1-06)

The 1991 Railway Cup Hurling Championship was the 64th staging of the Railway Cup, the Gaelic Athletic Association's premier inter-provincial hurling tournament. The championship began on 10 March 1991 and ended on 7 April 1991.

Connacht were the defending champions.

On 7 April 1991, Connacht won the cup following a 1-13 to 0-12 defeat of Munster in the final. This was their 8th Railway Cup title and their second in succession after winning the last cup title in 1989.

== Results ==
Semi-finals

10 March 1991 Semi-final	Munster	2-19 - 1-10	Leinster	Páirc Uí Chaoimh, Cork
	N English 1-2, T O'Sullivan 0-5, C Bonnar 1-1, B O'Sullivan 0-3, T Guilfoyle 0-3, J Leahy 0-3, G Fitzgerald 0-2.		DJ Carey 1-0, J Houlihan 0-3, B McMahon 0-2, T Dempsey 0-2, R Mannion 0-1, G Jackson 0-1, L Dunne 0-1.	Referee: G McGlory (Antrim)

10 March 1991 Semi-final	Connacht	1-11 - 1-6	Ulster	Kenny Park, Athenry
	J Cooney 1-1, M Connolly 0-3, M McGrath 0-2, M Naughton 0-2, G Burke 0-2, J Rabbitte 0-1.		G McGeehan 1-0, J Elliott 0-3, A Elliott 0-1, D Hughes 0-1, C Barr 0-1.	Referee: T Murray (Limerick)

Final

7 April 1991 Final	Connacht	1-13 - 0-12	Munster	Croke Park, Dublin
	M McGrath 1-4, G Burke 0-3, J Cooney 0-2, A Cunningham 0-2, J Rabbitte 0-2.		M Cleary 0-7, T Guilfoyle 0-2, B O'Sullivan 0-1, G Fitzgerald 0-1, J Leahy 0-1.	Attendance: 2,000; Referee: D Murphy (Wexford)

== Scoring statistics ==
Top scorers overall

Rank	Player	Team	Tally	Total
1	Michael McGrath	Connacht	1-06	9
2	Michael Cleary	Munster	0-07	7
3	Joe Cooney	Connacht	1-03	6

Top scorers in a single game

Rank	Player	Team	Tally	Total	Opposition
1	Michael McGrath	Connacht	1-04	7	Munster
1	Michael Cleary	Munster	0-07	7	Connacht
3	Nicky English	Munster	1-02	5	Leinster
3	Tony O'Sullivan	Munster	0-05	5	Leinster
5	Cormac Bonnar	Munster	1-01	4	Leinster
5	Joe Cooney	Connacht	1-01	4	Ulster

== Bibliography ==
- Donegan, Des, The Complete Handbook of Gaelic Games (DBA Publications Limited, 2005).
