= 2019 Galway Intermediate Hurling Championship =

- Dates: 5 April 2019 – 3 November 2019
- Teams: 14
- Sponsor: Galmont Hotel
- Champions: Kinvara (2nd title); Tom O'Donovan (captain)
- Runners-up: Kilconieron; Conor Caulfield (captain)
- Relegated: Kiltormer

The 2019 Galway Intermediate Hurling Championship was the 61st staging of the Galway Intermediate Hurling Championship since its establishment by the Galway County Board in 1949. The championship began on 5 April 2019 and ended on 3 November 2019.

On 3 November 2019, Kinvara won the championship after a 1-10 to 0-12 defeat of Kilconieron in the final at Kenny Park. It was their second championship overall and their first title since 1966.

== Results ==
=== Relegation playoffs ===
| 12 October 2019 Semi-final | Kiltormer | 1-13 - 1-14 | Sylane |

| 18 October 2019 Semi-final | Kilbeacanty | 0-16 - 2-11 | Castlegar |

| 2 November 2019 Final | Kilbeacanty | 1-17 - 2-11 | Kiltormer |

=== Quarter-finals ===
| 12 October 2019 Quarter-final | Moycullen | 3-18 - 1-17 | Annaghdown | Pearse Stadium, Galway |

| 13 October 2019 Quarter-final | Kilconieron | 2-15 - 2-08 | Killimor | Duggan Park, Ballinasloe |

| 13 October 2019 Quarter-final | Turloughmore | 2-21 - 1-16 | Rahoon-Newcastle | Pearse Stadium, Galway |

| 13 October 2019 Quarter-final | Kinvara | 3-14 - 0-17 | Meelick-Eyrecourt | Kenny Park, Athenry |

=== Semi-finals ===
| 20 October 2019 Semi-final | Kinvara | 4-14 - 0-11 | Moycullen | Kenny Park, Athenry |

| 20 October 2019 Semi-final | Kilconieron | 0-15 - 0-13 | Turloughmore | Kenny Park, Athenry |

=== Final ===
| 3 November 2019 Final | Kinvara | 1-10 - 0-12 | Kilconieron | Kenny Park, Athenry |
| | | Report |
