= Gerry McInerney (Galway hurler) =

Irish hurler

Personal information
- Born: 14 March 1965 (age 61) Galway, Ireland
- Height: 1.81 m (5 ft 11 in)

Sport
- Sport: Hurling
- Position: Left half back
Club
- Years: Club
- Kinvara
Inter-county
- Years: County
- 1986–1996: Galway
Inter-county titles
- All-Irelands: 2
- NHL: 1

Gerry McInerney (born 14 March 1965 in Kinvara) is a former Irish sportsperson. He played hurling with his local club Kinvara and with the Galway senior inter-county team in the 1980s and 1990s.

== Career ==
McInerney traveled to the US in 1985 to play hurling for the weekend and ended up staying there for the next five years until returning permanently in 1990. Each year he had traveled back in August to play for Galway in the All-Ireland semi-finals. He became known for his white boots which he purchased in the USA. He won back-to-back All-Ireland winners' medals with Galway in 1987 and 1988. At the age of 42 he was the player-coach for the 2007 Kinvara squad.

== Honours ==
Galway

- All-Ireland Senior Hurling Championship (2): 1987, 1988
