= John Holohan =

Irish hurler (1890–1947)

Personal information
- Native name: Seán Ó hUallacháin (Irish)
- Born: 11 November 1890 Johnstown, County Kilkenny, Ireland
- Died: 19 May 1947 (aged 56) Johnstown, County Kilkenny, Ireland
- Occupation: Farmer

Sport
- Sport: Hurling
- Position: Full-back
Clubs
- Years: Club
- Crosspatrick; Johnstown; Tullaroan
Club titles
- Kilkenny titles: 4
Inter-county
- Years: County
- 1915-1926: Kilkenny
Inter-county titles
- Leinster titles: 4
- All-Irelands: 1

John Holohan (11 November 1890 – 19 May 1947) was an Irish hurler who played as a full-back for the Kilkenny senior team.

Born in Johnstown, County Kilkenny, Holohan first excelled at cricket before turning to hurling. He arrived on the inter-county scene at the age of twenty-three when made his senior debut in a tournament game. Holohan went on to play a key part for Kilkenny over the next decade, and won one All-Ireland medal and four Leinster medals. He was an All-Ireland runner-up on one occasion.

At club level Holohan won four championship medals, playing with a variety of clubs including Crosspatrick, Johnstown and Tullaroan.

Holohan's retirement came prior to the start of the 1926 championship.

== Playing career ==
=== Club ===
Holohan first played club hurling in 1910 with Crosspatrick.

By 1912 he was playing with Johnstown and, two years later, lined out in his first championship decider. Erin's Own provided the opposition, however, they provided little opposition and failed to score. Johnstown registered 3-1, giving Holohan his first championship medal.

Holohan transferred to the Tulalroan club in 1915, a decision which resulted in him lining out in a second successive county decider. A 7-2 to 2-2 trouncing of Dicksboro gave him a second championship medal.

A period of political instability in Ireland over the next decade led to the county championship either being delayed, unfinished or suspended. In 1924 Holohan lined out in his third county decider. Tullaroan defeated Clonmanto by 4-4 to 2-2, giving him a third championship medal.

Tullaroan retained their title in 1925. A narrow 3-4 to 3-3 defeat of Dicksboro gave Holohan a fourth and final championship medal.

=== Inter-county ===
Holohan was first selected for Kilkenny in February 1915 for the semi-final of the Wolfe Tone Tournament.

In 1916 Holohan was a key member of the Kilkenny team that made a breakthrough in the championship. An 11-3 to 2-2 trouncing of Wexford in the provincial decider gave him his first Leinster medal. On 21 January 1917 Kilkenny faced Tipperary in the All-Ireland final. Kilkenny, however, were not the force they once were, having won seven All-Ireland titles in the previous decade, and a 5-4 to 3-2 score line resulted in victory for Tipperary.

Kilkenny went into decline following this defeat, however, Holohan remained on the team, losing four provincial deciders over the next few years.

In 1922 Kilkenny bounced back. A 3-4 to 1-2 halted Dublin's march to a fourth successive provincial title, and gave Holohan a second Leinster medal. On 9 September 1923 Kilkenny faced old rivals Tipperary in the All-Ireland decider in front of a crowd of over 26,000 at Croke Park. For long periods of the game Tipperary held the lead, and with three minutes to go they were three points to the good. Two late goals by Paddy Donoghue and Dick Tobin secured a 4-2 to 2-6 victory for Kilkenny and an All-Ireland medal for Holohan.

Kilkenny retained their provincial crown in 1923. A 4-1 to 1-1 defeat of Dublin gave Holohan a third Leinster medal. On 18 May 1924 Kilkenny were defeated on a 5-4 to 2-0 score line by eventual All-Ireland champions Galway in the semi-final.

Holohan won a fourth and final Leinster medal in 1925, albeit in controversial circumstances. Dublin had actually won the game by 6-4 to 4-7, however, a successful objection by Kilkenny resulted in "the Cats" being awarded the title. On 9 August 1925 Kilkenny faced a 9-4 to 6-0 defeat by Galway in the All-Ireland semi-final.

In May 1926 Holohan was selected on the panel for Kilkenny's final National Hurling League game against Limerick. Though he attended the game he did not tog out as he did not expect he would be used. His failure to do so later became the subject of a bitter dispute between the Tullaroan club and the chairman of the Kilkenny County Board. Holohan decided to retire from hurling prior to Kilkenny's opening game in the subsequent championship.

== Honours ==
=== Team ===
Johnstown

- Kilkenny Senior Hurling Championship (1): 1914

Tullaroan

- Kilkenny Senior Hurling Championship (3): 1915, 1924, 1925

Kilkenny

- All-Ireland Senior Hurling Championship (1): 1922
- Leinster Senior Hurling Championship (4): 1916, 1922, 1923, 1925
