= 1985 All-Ireland Minor Hurling Championship =

All-Ireland Minor Hurling Championship 1985
Championship Details
- Dates: 24 April 1985 - 1 September 1985
- Teams: 16

All Ireland Champions
- Winners: Cork (15th win)
- Captain: Michael O'Mahony
- Manager: Charlie McCarthy; Johnny Clifford

All Ireland Runners-up
- Runners-up: Wexford
- Captain: Paul Nolan

Provincial Champions
- Munster: Cork
- Leinster: Wexford
- Ulster: Down
- Connacht: Not Played

Championship Statistics
- Top Scorer: Vinny Murphy (2-36)

The 1985 All-Ireland Minor Hurling Championship was the 55th staging of the All-Ireland Minor Hurling Championship since its establishment by the Gaelic Athletic Association in 1928. The championship began on 24 April 1985 and ended on 1 September 1985.

Limerick entered the championship as the defending champions, however, they were beaten by Cork in the Munster semi-final.

On 1 September 1985, Cork won the championship following a 3–10 to 0–12 defeat of Wexford in the All-Ireland final. This was their 15th All-Ireland title and their first in six championship seasons.

Wexford's Vinny Murphy was the championship's top scorer with 2-36.

== Results ==
=== Leinster Minor Hurling Championship ===
First round

11 May 1985 First round	Meath	1-05 - 4-14	Laois	St. Loman's Park, Trim

11 May 1985 First round	Wexford	2-16 - 1-03	Dublin	Dr. Cullen Park, Carlow
	S Wickham 1-4, V Murphy 0-5, P Carton 1-0, E Sinnott 0-3, B Dwyer 0-2, P Canahan 0-1, E Broaders 0-1.		B Mahon 1-1, P Elliott 0-1, A Doyle 0-1.

Semi-finals

25 May 1985 Semi-final	Kilkenny	2-14 - 1-03	Laois	Dr. Cullen Park, Carlow
	L Dowling 0-6, P Walsh 1-1, P Hogan 1-0, E Brennan 0-3, J Brennan 0-3, J Feehan 0-1.		P Bergin 1-0, J Fahy 0-2, P Dollard 0-1.

29 May 1985 Semi-final	Wexford	1-20 - 2-10	Offaly	Dr. Cullen Park, Carlow
	V Murphy 0-9, E Broaders 1-2, G Cushe 0-3, J Biger 0-3, S Wickham 0-2, B Moran 0-1.		B Kelly 0-5, G Cahill 0-4, K Dalton 1-0, M Duignan 1-0, R Byrne 0-1.	Referee: P Delaney (Laois)

Final

21 July 1985 Final	Wexford	0-12 - 0-08	Kilkenny	Croke Park, Dublin
	V Murphy 0-7, G Cushe 0-2, B Moran 0-2, E Sinnott 0-1.		L Egan 0-4, L Dowling 0-2, P Grace 0-1, M Phelan 0-1.

=== Munster Minor Hurling Championship ===
First round

24 April 1985 First round	Limerick	3-16 - 2-03	Waterford	Semple Stadium, Thurles
	L Clohessy 2-1, P Barrett 1-4, G Kirby 0-5, L O'Connor 0-2, J Enright 0-2, R Ryan 0-1, M O'Brien 0-1.		D Curley 1-2, K Sheridan 1-0, M McGrath 0-1.

24 April 1985 First round	Kerry	1-03 - 9-12	Clare	Hermitage Park, Lixnaw
	P Healy 1-0, B Diggins0-1, E Kearney 0-1, K O'Connor 0-1.		D McInerney 3-3, N Casey 2-1, H Hehir 2-1, L Alford 0-4, M Hickey 1-0, J Chaplin 0-2, C O'Neill 0-1.

Semi-finals

8 May 1985 Semi-final	Tipperary	4-08 - 2-12	Clare	Gaelic Grounds, Limerick
	D Quirke 2-2, M Nolan 1-3, A Rossiter 1-0, D Quinlan 0-3.		D McInerney 0-7, S Chaplin 2-0, C O'Neill 0-2, B McMahon 0-1, M Cahill 0-1, F Carrick 0-1.

15 May 1985 Semi-final	Cork	1-12 - 1-08	Limerick	Semple Stadium, Thurles
	M Foley 1-5, K McGuckian 0-1, K Cotter 0-1, L Kelly 0-1, J Fitzgibbon 0-1, B Harte 0-1, D O'Connell 0-1, C Mullins 0-1.		G Kiely 0-4, S Clohessy 1-0, P Barrett 0-3, S Enright 0-1.

Finals

7 July 1985 Final	Cork	1-13 - 1-08	Tipperary	Páirc Uí Chaoimh, Cork
	G Manley 1-3, M Foley 0-5, B Harte 0-1, J Fitzgibbon 0-1, M Mullins 0-1, C Casey 0-1, M O'Mahony 0-1.		A Lanigan 1-1, D Quirke 0-4, L Cleary 0-1, A Rossiter 0-1, M Nolan 0-1.	Referee: T Murray (Limerick)

=== Ulster Minor Hurling Championship ===
Semi-final

7 July 1985 Semi-final	Antirm	1-09 - 0-07	Derry

Final

28 July 1985 Final	Down	5-04 - 2-09	Antrim	St. Patrick's Park, Portaferry
	E Blayney 2-1, J Morgan 1-1, D Hawkins 1-1, M Doran 1-0, K O'Connor 0-1.		J Elliott 1-2, L McCurdy 0-5, D McKillop 1-1, N Elliott 0-1.

=== All-Ireland Minor Hurling Championship ===
Semi-finals

4 August 1985 Semi-final	Cork	3-09 - 3-03	Galway	Croke Park, Dublin
	M Foley 2-3, M Mullins 1-2, C Casey 0-1, G Manley 0-1, G O'Riordan 0-1, M O'Mahony 0-1.		E Burke 1-1, A Forde 1-0, O Shaughnessy 1-0, R Deane 0-1.	Referee: J Denton (Wexford)

4 August 1985 Semi-final	Wexford	7-17 - 2-02	Down	Athletic Grounds, Armagh
	V Murphy 2-9, P Carter 2-1, B Moran 2-0, P O'Callaghan 1-1, G Cushe 0-3, E Sinnott 0-1, S Wickham 0-1, J O'Connor 0-1.		N Sands 1-1, M Doran 1-0, E Blaney 0-1.	Referee: JJ Corcoran (Galway)

Final

1 September 1985 Final	Cork	3-10 - 0-12	Wexford	Croke Park, Dublin
	G Manley 1-2, M O'Mahony 1-1, J Fitzgibbon 1-0, B Harte 0-3, L Kelly 0-2, M Mullins 0-1, C Casey 0-1.		V Murphy 0-6, P O'Callaghan 0-2, L O'Gorman 0-2, J Bolger 0-1, J O'Connor 0-1.

== Championship statistics ==
=== Top scorers ===
Overall

Rank	Player	Club	Tally	Total	Matches	Average
1	Vinny Murphy	Wexford	2-36	42	5	8.40
2	Mark Foley	Cork	3-13	22	4	5.50
3	Declan McInerney	Clare	3-10	19	2	9.50
