= 1986 Railway Cup Hurling Championship =

Irish hurling competition

- Dates: 16 February 1986 - 17 March 1986
- Teams: 4
- Champions: Connacht (5th title)
- Runners-up: Munster

Tournament statistics
- Matches played: 3
- Goals scored: 6 (2 per match)
- Points scored: 71 (23.67 per match)
- Top scorer(s): John Fenton (0-15)

The 1986 Railway Cup Hurling Championship was the 60th staging of the Railway Cup since its establishment by the Gaelic Athletic Association in 1927. The cup began on 16 February 1986 and ended on 17 March 1986.

Munster were the defending champions.

On 17 March 1986, Connacht won the cup after a 3–11 to 0–11 defeat of Connacht in the final at Duggan Park. This was their fifth Railway Cup title overall and their first title since 1983.

== Results ==
=== Semi-finals ===
16 February 1986 Semi-final	Connacht	1-10 - 1-09	Leinster	Pearse Stadium, Galway
	PJ Molloy 1-1, J Cooney 0-4, A Cunningham 0-2, S Linnane 0-1, B Lynskey 0-1, M McGrath 0-1.		P Corrigan 1-6, P Cleary 0-1, G Fennelly 0-1, P Horan 0-1.	Referee: T Murray (Limerick)

16 February 1986 Semi-final	Munster	1-19 - 0-11	Ulster	Croke Park, Dublin
	J Fenton 0-10, N English 0-5, P McCarthy 1-1, D O'Connell 0-1, T O'Sullivan 0-1, D Walsh 0-1.		D Donnelly 0-5, M Mageean 0-4, M Bailie 0-1, D McKinley 0-1.

=== Final ===
17 March 1986 Final	Connacht	3-11 - 0-11	Munster	Duggan Park, Ballinasloe
	N Lane 2-1, M Connolly 1-1, PJ Molloy 0-4, J Cooney 0-2, M McGrath 0-1, P Malone 0-1, A Cunningham 0-1.		J Fenton 0-5, C Lyons 0-3, N English 0-1, G Cunningham 0-1, J Carroll 0-1.	Referee: J Bailey (Dublin)

== Scoring statistics ==
Top scorers overall

Rank	Player	Club	Tally	Total	Matches	Average
1	John Fenton	Munster	0-15	15	2	7.50
1	Paddy Corrigan	Leinster	1-06	9	1	9.00
3	P. J. Molloy	Connacjt	1-05	8	2	4.00

== Bibliography ==
- Donegan, Des, The Complete Handbook of Gaelic Games (DBA Publications Limited, 2005).
