= 1987 Railway Cup Hurling Championship =

Irish hurling competition

- Dates: 3 October 1987 - 4 October 1987
- Teams: 4
- Champions: Connacht (6th title)
- Runners-up: Leinster

Tournament statistics
- Matches played: 4
- Goals scored: 16 (4 per match)
- Points scored: 121 (30.25 per match)

The 1987 Railway Cup Hurling Championship was the 61st staging of the Railway Cup since its establishment by the Gaelic Athletic Association in 1927. The cup began on 3 October 1987 and ended on 4 October 1987.

Connacht were the defending champions.

On 4 October 1987, Connacht won the cup after a 2-14 to 1-14 defeat of Leinster in the final at Cusack Park. This was their sixth Railway Cup title overall and their second title in succession.

== Results ==
=== Semi-finals ===
3 October 1987 Semi-final	Connacht	5-13 - 0-15	Ulster	Cusack Park, Ennis

3 October 1987 Semi-final	Munster	1-11 - 1-16	Leinster	Cusack Park, Ennis

=== Shield final ===
4 October 1987 Shield final	Ulster	3-20 - 3-18 (aet)	Munster	Cusack Park, Ennis
	D Donnelly 2-9, C Mageean 1-1, D McNaughton 0-4, C Barr 0-3, P Savage 0-1, B Donnelly 0-1, P McKillen 0-1.		J Fenton 1-6, T Guilfoyle 1-3, N English 1-0, P Fox 0-3, L O'Donoghue 0-2, A Ryan 0-2, P Hartnett 0-1, S Fitzgibbon 0-1.	Referee: S Brennan (Galway)

=== Final ===
4 October 1987 Final	Connacht	2-14 - 1-14	Leinster	Cusack Park, Ennis
	M McGrath 0-4, J Cooney 0-4, B Lynskey 1-0, PJ Molloy 1-0, T Kilkenny 0-2, M Naughton 0-1, A Cunningham 0-1, E Ryan 0-1, S Mahon 0-1.		G Fennelly 0-5, L Ryan 1-1, P Cleary 0-4, B Keeshan 0-2, H Ryan 0-1, R Power 0-1.	Referee: G Ryan (Tipperary)

== Bibliography ==
- Donegan, Des, The Complete Handbook of Gaelic Games (DBA Publications Limited, 2005). ISBN 978-0-9551115-0-1.
