= 1989 Railway Cup Hurling Championship =

Irish hurling competition

- Dates: 7 October 1989 - 8 October 1989
- Teams: 4
- Champions: Connacht (7th title)
- Runners-up: Munster

Tournament statistics
- Matches played: 4
- Goals scored: 19 (4.75 per match)
- Points scored: 153 (38.25 per match)
- Top scorer(s): Mark Corrigan (2-15)

The 1989 Railway Cup Hurling Championship was the 63rd staging of the Railway Cup since its establishment by the Gaelic Athletic Association in 1927. The cup began on 7 October 1989 and ended on 8 October 1989.

Leinster were the defending champions, however, they were beaten by Connacht in the semi-final.

On 8 October 1989, Connacht won the cup after a 4-16 to 3-17 defeat of Munster in the final at Wexford Park. This was their 7th Railway Cup title overall and their first title since 1987.

== Results ==
=== Semi-finals ===
7 October 1989 Semi-final	Munster	3-31 - 1-22 (aet)	Ulster	Wexford Park, Wexford
	N English 0-11, Cormac Bonnar 2-2, S Ahearne 1-2, P Fox 0-4, T O'Sullivan 0-4, T Guilfoyle 0-3, M Cleary 0-2, Conal Bonnar 0-2, C O'Donovan 0-1.		P McKillen 0-4, O McFetridge 0-4, J McNaughton 0-3, B Coulter 0-3, C Mageean 1-0, T McNaughton 0-2, B Donnelly 0-2, D Hughes 0-2, A McCarry 0-2.

7 October 1989 Semi-final	Leinster	2-15 - 1-19	Connacht	Wexford Park, Wexford
	M Corrigan 1-10, PJ Cuddy 1-0, B McMahon 0-2, L Ryan 0-2, G O'Connor 0-1.		J Cooney 0-9, G Burke 1-1, T Mongahan 0-2, M Kenny 0-2, E Ryan 0-2, P Higgins 0-1, M Coleman 0-1, A Cunningham 0-1.	Referee: W Horgan (Cork)

=== Shield final ===
8 October 1989 Shield final	Leinster	4-20 - 1-11	Ulster	Wexford Park, Wexford
	B McMahon 2-2, M Corrigan 1-5, L Ryan 1-3, PJ Cuddy 0-4, M Duignan 0-1, M Cleere 0-1, G O'Connor 0-1, S Dalton 0-1, M Storey 0-1.		N Sands 1-0, O McFetridge 0-2, T McNaughton 0-2, D Hughes 0-2, JP McKillop 0-1, P Branniff 0-1, A McCarry 0-1, P McKillen 0-1, M Bailie 0-1.	Referee: T Murray (Limerick)

=== Final ===
8 October 1989 Final	Connacht	4-16 - 3-17	Munster	Wexford Park, Wexford
	E Ryan 2-2, M Kenny 1-3, G Burke 1-2, J Cooney 0-5, F Dolan 0-3, P Malone 0-1.		N English 0-7, S Fitzgibbon 1-2, T Guilfoyle 1-0, Cormac Bonnar 1-0, Conal Bonnar 0-3, G Kirby 0-2, M Cleary 0-2, S Ahearne 0-1.	Referee: P Long (Kilkenny)

== Scoring statistics ==
Top scorers overall

Rank	Player	Club	Tally	Total	Matches	Average
1	Mark Corrigan	Leinster	2-15	21	2	10.50
2	Nicky English	Munster	0-18	18	2	9.00
3	Cormac Bonnar	Munster	3-02	11	2	5.50

== Bibliography ==
- Donegan, Des, The Complete Handbook of Gaelic Games (DBA Publications Limited, 2005).
