= 1990 All-Ireland Senior Hurling Championship =

Championship details
- Dates: 13 May – 2 September 1990
- Teams: 15

All-Ireland champions
- Winning team: Cork (27th win)
- Captain: Tomás Mulcahy
- Manager: Michael O'Brien

All-Ireland Finalists
- Losing team: Galway
- Captain: Joe Cooney
- Manager: Cyril Farrell

Provincial champions
- Munster: Cork
- Leinster: Offaly
- Ulster: Antrim
- Connacht: Not Played

Championship statistics
- No. matches played: 14
- Goals total: 63 (4.5 per game)
- Points total: 395 (28.21 per game)
- Top Scorer: John Fitzgibbon (7-09)
- Player of the Year: Tony O'Sullivan
- All-Star Team: See here

The 1990 All-Ireland Senior Hurling Championship was the 104th staging of the All-Ireland Senior Hurling Championship, the Gaelic Athletic Association's premier inter-county hurling tournament. The draw for the 1990 provincial fixtures took place in November 1989. The championship began on 13 May 1990 and ended on 2 September 1990.

Tipperary were the defending champions but were defeated by Cork in the Munster final. London qualified for the championship for the first time in two years.

On 2 September 1990, Cork won the championship following a 5–15 to 2–21 defeat of Galway in the All-Ireland final. This was their 27th All-Ireland title, their first in four championship seasons.

Cork's John Fitzgibbon was the championship's top scorer with 7-09. Cork's Tony O'Sullivan was the unanimous choice for Hurler of the Year.

== Championship draw ==
As a result of the Republic of Ireland football team qualifying for the 1990 FIFA World Cup, the Munster Council took precautions in avoiding a fixtures clash and a potential loss of revenue by changing the dates and times of their games.

== Team changes ==
=== To Championship ===
Promoted from the All-Ireland Senior B Hurling Championship

- London (qualified)

=== From Championship ===
Regraded to the All-Ireland Senior B Hurling Championship

- Derry
- Kildare
- Westmeath

== Teams ==
=== Overview ===
A total of fifteen teams contested the championship, two fewer teams than participated in the 1989 championship.

The Leinster championship was reduced to five teams as Westmeath decided to opt out and field a team in the All-Ireland Senior B Hurling Championship.

The Ulster championship was reduced to just two teams as Derry also decided to field a team in the lower championship.

=== General information ===
Fifteen counties will compete in the All-Ireland Senior Hurling Championship: one team from the Connacht Senior Hurling Championship, five teams in the Leinster Senior Hurling Championship, six teams in the Munster Senior Hurling Championship, two teams from the Ulster Senior Hurling Championship and one team from the All-Ireland Senior B Hurling Championship.

County	Last provincial title	Last championship title	Position in 1989 Championship	Current championship
Antrim	1989	—	Runners-up	Ulster Senior Hurling Championship
Clare	1932	1914	Munster quarter-finals	Munster Senior Hurling Championship
Cork	1986	1986	Munster semi-finals	Munster Senior Hurling Championship
Down	1942	—	Ulster runners-up	Ulster Senior Hurling Championship
Dublin	1961	1938	Leinster quarter-finals	Leinster Senior Hurling Championship
Galway	1922	1988	Semi-finals	Connacht Senior Hurling Championship
Kerry	1891	1891	Munster quarter-finals	Munster Senior Hurling Championship
Kilkenny	1987	1983	Leinster runners-up	Leinster Senior Hurling Championship
Laois	1949	1915	Leinster semi-finals	Leinster Senior Hurling Championship
Limerick	1981	1973	Munster semi-finals	Munster Senior Hurling Championship
London	—	1901		All-Ireland Senior B Hurling Championship
Offaly	1989	1985	Semi-finals	Leinster Senior Hurling Championship
Tipperary	1989	1989	Champions	Munster Senior Hurling Championship
Waterford	1963	1959	Munster runners-up	Munster Senior Hurling Championship
Wexford	1977	1968	Leinster semi-finals	Leinster Senior Hurling Championship

=== Team summaries ===
Team	Grounds		
Team	Grounds	Antrim	Casement Park
Clare	Cusack Park		
Cork	Páirc Uí Chaoimh		
Down	Páirc Esler		
Dublin	Parnell Park		
Galway	Pearse Stadium		
Kerry	Austin Stack Park		
Kilkenny	Nowlan Park		
Laois	O'Moore Park		
Limerick	Gaelic Grounds		
London	Emerald GAA Grounds		
Offaly	St. Brendan's Park		
Tipperary	Semple Stadium		
Waterford	Walsh Park		
Wexford	Wexford Park		

== Provincial championships ==
=== Leinster Senior Hurling Championship ===
==== Bracket ====
Quarter-finals
Wexford	2–23
Laois	5–04

Semi-finals
Dublin	2–16
Wexford	1–17
Offaly	4–15
Kilkenny	1–08

Leinster final
Dublin	2–11
Offaly	1–19

==== Quarter-finals ====
27 May 1990
Quarter-Final

Wexford	2–23 – 5-04	Laois
J. Holohan (0–12), B. Byrne (0–4), M. Reck (1–0), T. Dempsey (1–0), L. O'Gorman (0–3), L. Dunne (0–1), R. Coleman (0–1).		N. Rigney (2–1), J. Fitzpatrick (2–1), P. J. Cuddy (1–0), P. O'Brien (0–1), O. Coss (0–1).

Nowlan Park, Kilkenny
Referee: P. Long (Kilkenny)

==== Semi-finals ====
17 June 1990
Semi-Final

Dublin	2–16 – 1–17	Wexford
B. McMahon (1–3), M. J. Ryan (1–2), K. Hetherton (0–5), S. McDermott (0–2), R. Boland (0–1), S. Kearns (0–1), M. Ryan (0–1), S. Fleming (0–1).		T. Dempsey (1–3), J. O'Connor (0–5), J. Holohan (0–2), G. O'Connor (0–2), M. Storey (0–2), M. Rack (0–1), L. O'Gorman (0–1), B. Byrne (0–1).

Croke Park, Dublin
Referee: P. Delaney (Laois)

17 June 1990
Semi-Final

Offaly	4–15 – 1-08	Kilkenny
P. Cleary (2–0), D. Owens (1–3), D. Pilkington (0–6), J. Kelly (1–1), J. Pilkington (0–2), M. Duignan (0–2), A. Cahill (0–1).		É. Morrissey (0–4), L. Ryan (1–0), A. Ronan (0–1), L. McCarthy (0–1), D. J. Carey (0–1), M. Phelan (0–1).

Croke Park, Dublin
Referee: J. Denton (Wexford)

==== Leinster final ====
8 July 1990
Final

Dublin	2–11 – 1–19	Offaly
S. McDermott (1–2), R. Boland (1–0), B. McMahon (0–3), M. J. Ryan (0–2), S. Dalton (0–1), J. Twomey (0–1), S. Boland (0–1), K. Hetherton (0–1).		M. Corrigan (1–3), D. Pilkington (0–4), P. Cleary (0–3), D. Regan (0–3), D. Owens (0–2), M. Duignan (0–2), J. Kelly (0–1), B. Whelehan (0–1).

Croke Park, Dublin
Attendance: 20,383
Referee: J. Denton (Wexford)

=== Munster Senior Hurling Championship ===
13 May 1990
Quarter-Final

Clare	1–05 – 2–16	Limerick
G. McInerney (1–0), C. Lyons (0–3), M. Nugent (0–1), J. O'Connor (0–1).		G. Kirby (0–7), S. Fitzgibbon (1–3), T. Kenny (1–0), L. O'Connor (0–2), P. Davoren (0–1), C. Carey (0–1), D. Flynn (0–1), A. Carmody (0–1).

Cusack Park, Ennis
Attendance: 13,560
Referee: W. Barrett (Tipperary)

20 May 1990
Quarter-Final

Kerry	3–07 – 3–16	Cork
C. Walsh (1–2), J. Hennessy (0–4), J. O'Sullivan (1–0), T. Maunsell (1–0), E. Murphy (0–1).		K. Hennessy (2–2), B. O'Sullivan (1–2), M. Foley (0–2), P. Buckley (0–2), S. McCarthy (0–2), K. Kingston (0–2), M. Mullins (0–1), T. McCarthy (0–1), G. FitzGerald (0–1), K. McGuckin (0–1).

Austin Stack Park, Tralee
Referee: M. Quinn (Clare)

3 June 1990
Semi-Final

Cork	4–15 – 1-08	Waterford
G. FitzGerald (2–3), K. Hennessy (2–3), T. O'Sullivan (0–3), M. Foley (0–2), B. O'Sullivan (0–1), S. McCarthy (0–1), J. Cashman (0–1), P. Buckley (0–1).		D. Henley (1–0), K. Delahunty (0–3), N. Crowley (0–3), S. Aherne (0–1), L. O'Connor (0–1).

Semple Stadium, Thurles
Attendance: 15,970
Referee: T. Murray (Limerick)

10 June 1990
Semi-Final

Limerick	1–17 – 2–20	Tipperary
G. Kirby (0–8), M. Galligan (1–0), S. Fitzgibbon (0–3), C. Carey (0–2), T. Kenny (0–2), D. Flynn (0–1), M. Reale (0–1).		D. Ryan (1–4), N. English (0–7), D. Ryan (1–0), M. Cleary (0–3), J. Leahy (0–2), P. Fox (0–1), P. Delaney (0–1), D. Carr (0–1), J. Hayes (0–1).

Gaelic Grounds, Limerick
Attendance: 34,402
Referee: W. Horgan (Cork)

15 July 1990
Final

Tipperary	2–14 – 4–16	Cork
M. Cleary (1–5), N. English (1–4), C. Stakelum (0–2), J. Leahy (0–2), D. Ryan (0–1).		M. Foley (2–7), J. Fitzgibbon (2–0), T. O'Sullivan (0–5), C. Casey (0–1), G. FitzGerald (0–1), K. Hennessy (0–1), D. Quirke (0–1).

Semple Stadium, Thurles
Attendance: 49,782
Referee: J. Moore (Waterford)

=== Ulster Senior Hurling Championship ===
8 July 1990
Final

Antrim	4–11 – 2–11	Down
S. P. McKillop (1–2), O. McFetridge (0–5), N. Murray (1–0), C. Barr (1–0), J. Close (1–0), A. McGuile (0–1), P. McKillen (0–1), B. Donnelly (0–1), A. McCarry (0–1).		P. Savage (2–0), M. Blaney (0–3), B. Coulter (0–2), J. McCarthy (0–2), N. Sands (0–2), M. Ballie (0–1), K. Coulter (0–1).

Casement Park, Belfast
Referee: P. Delaney (Laois)

== All-Ireland Senior Hurling Championship ==
=== Bracket ===
Quarter-finals
Galway	1–23
London	2–11

Semi-finals
Offaly	2-07
Galway	1-16
Cork	2–20
Antrim	1–13

Final
Galway	2–21
Cork	5–15

=== All-Ireland quarter-finals ===
23 July 1990
Quarter-Final

Galway	1–23 – 2–11	London
J. Cooney (0–9), M. McGrath (1–3), N. Lane (0–3), T. Monaghan (0–3), É. Ryan (0–2), A. Cunningham (0–1), G. Burke (0–1), T. Keady (0–1).		M. Connolly (0–5), J. Murphy (1–0), P. O'Donoghue (1–0), A. Moylan (0–2), P. Lynch (0–1), D. McKenna (0–1), J. Quinn (0–1), W. Carroll (0–1).

Duggan Park, Ballinasloe
Referee: G. McGlory (Antrim)

=== All-Ireland semi-finals ===
5 August 1990
Semi-Final

Cork	2–20 – 1–13	Antrim
J. Fitzgibbon (2–2), T. O'Sullivan (0–6), G. FitzGerald (0–5), T. Mulcahy (0–2), J. Cashman (0–1), K. McGuckin (0–1), P. Buckley (0–1), B. O'Sullivan (0–1), K. Hennessy (0–1).		G. Barr (1–2), O. McFetridge (0–4), B. Donnelly (0–4), S. McKillop (0–1), B. Laverty (0–1), P. McKillen (0–1).

Croke Park, Dublin
Attendance: 40,786
Referee: P. Delaney (Laois)

5 August 1990
Semi-Final

Galway	1-16 – 2-07	Offaly
J. Cooney (0–8), É. Ryan (1–1), M. McGrath (0–4), P. Malone (0–2), M. Coleman (0–1).		P. Corrigan (1–0), D. Owens (1–0), M. Corrigan (0–3), A. Cahill (0–2), M. Duignan (0–1), D. Regan (0–1).

Croke Park, Dublin
Attendance: 40,786
Referee: T. Murray (Limerick)

=== All-Ireland final ===
2 September 1990
Final
15:30

Cork	5–15 – 2–21	Galway
J. Fitzgibbon (2–1), K. Hennessy (1–4), T. Mulcahy (1–2), M. Foley (1–1), T. McCarthy (0–3), T. O'Sullivan (0–2), G. FitzGerald (0–1), K. McGuckin (0–1).		J. Cooney (1–7), N. Lane (0–4), M. Naughton (0–4), B. Lynskey (1–0), É. Ryan (0–2), T. Keady (0–1), M. McGrath (0–1), A. Cunningham (0–1), M. Coleman (0–1).

Croke Park, Dublin
Attendance: 63,954
Referee: J. Moore (Waterford)

== Championship statistics ==
=== Scoring ===
- First goal of the championship: Shane Fitzgibbon for Limerick against Clare (Munster quarter-final, 13 May 1990)
- Widest winning margin: 16 points
  - Cork 4–15 : 1–8 Waterford (Munster semi-final, 3 June 1990)
  - Offaly 4–15 : 1–8 Kilkenny (Leinster semi-final, 17 June 1990)
- Most goals in a match: 7
  - Wexford 2–23 : 5–4 Laois (Leinster quarter -final, 27 May 1990)
  - Cork 5–15 : 2–21 Galway (All-Ireland final, 2 September 1990)
- Most points in a match: 37
  - Tipperary 2–20 : 1–17 Limerick (Munster semi-final, 10 June 1990)
- Most goals by one team in a match: 5
  - Laois 5–4 : 2–23 Wexford (Leinster quarter -final, 27 May 1990)
  - Cork 5–15 : 2–21 Galway (All-Ireland final, 2 September 1990)
- Most goals scored by a losing team: 5
  - Laois 5–4 : 2–23 Wexford (Leinster quarter -final, 27 May 1990)
- Most points scored by a losing team: 21
  - Galway 2–21 : 5–15 Cork (All-Ireland final, 2 September 1990)

=== Miscellaneous ===
- Cork were the first county since Tipperary in 1900 to be All-Ireland Champions in both football and hurling, 100 years after becoming the first team to do so in 1890. Tipperary (1895 and 1900) and Cork (1890 and 1990) are the only counties to have won the All-Ireland football and hurling champions in the same season.

== Top scorers ==
=== Season ===
Rank	Player	County	Tally	Total	Matches	Average
1	John Fitzgibbon	Cork	7-09	30	5	6.00
2	Joe Cooney	Galway	1–24	27	3	9.00
3	Kevin Hennessy	Cork	5–11	26	5	5.20
4	Mark Foley	Cork	3–12	21	5	4.20
5	Ger FitzGerald	Cork	2–11	17	5	3.40
6	Tony O'Sullivan	Cork	0–16	16	5	3.20
7	Gary Kirby	Limerick	0–15	15	2	7.50
8	Nicky English	Tipperary	1–11	14	2	7.00
8	John Holohan	Wexford	0–14	14	2	7.00
10	Michael Cleary	Tipperary	1-08	11	2	5.50

=== Single game ===
Rank	Player	County	Tally	Total	Opposition
1	Mark Foley	Cork	2-07	13	Tipperary
2	John Holohan	Wexford	0–12	12	Laois
3	Joe Cooney	Galway	1-07	10	Cork
4	Ger FitzGerald	Cork	2-03	9	Waterford
4	Kevin Hennessy	Cork	2-03	9	Waterford
4	Joe Cooney	Galway	0-09	9	London
5	Kevin Hennessy	Cork	2-02	8	Kerry
5	John Fitzgibbon	Cork	2-02	8	Antrim
5	Michael Cleary	Tipperary	1-05	8	Cork
5	Joe Cooney	Galway	0-08	8	Offaly

== Broadcasting ==
The following matches were broadcast live on television in Ireland on RTÉ. In the United Kingdom Channel 4 broadcast live coverage of the All-Ireland final. Highlights of a number of other games were shown on The Sunday Game.

Round	RTÉ	Channel 4
All-Ireland semi-finals	Cork vs Antrim; Galway vs Offaly	
All-Ireland final	Cork vs Galway	Cork vs Galway

== Sources ==
- Corry, Eoghan, The GAA Book of Lists (Hodder Headline Ireland, 2005).
- Donegan, Des, The Complete Handbook of Gaelic Games (DBA Publications Limited, 2005).
- Nolan, Pat, Flashbacks: A Half Century of Cork Hurling (The Collins Press, 2000).
- Sweeney, Éamonn, Munster Hurling Legends (The O'Brien Press, 2002).
