= Martin Naughton (hurler) =

Irish hurler

Personal information
- Native name: Mairtín Mac Neachtáin (Irish)
- Born: 3 June 1964 (age 62) Turloughmore, County Galway
- Occupation: Welder
- Height: 5 ft 10 in (178 cm)

Sport
- Sport: Hurling
- Position: Wing-forward
Club
- Years: Club
- Turloughmore
Inter-county
Years	County	Apps (scores)
1986–1992	Galway	15 (2–19)
Inter-county titles
- Connacht titles: 0
- All-Irelands: 2

Martin Naughton (born 3 June 1964) is a former Irish sportsperson. He played senior hurling with his local club Turloughmore and with the Galway senior inter-county team in the 1980s and 1990s.

== Early life ==
Martin Naughton was born in Turloughmore, County Galway in 1964. He was educated locally at Cregmore national school where he was first introduced to the game of hurling. Naughton later attended the Presentation College in Athenry where he won a county school's medal. He later worked in the marketing department of a local oil company.

== Playing career ==
=== Club ===
Naughton played his club hurling with his local Turloughmore club and enjoyed much success. He won a county minor title in the early 1980s before later joining the county senior side. Naughton won his sole senior county title in 1985. This was later converted into a Connacht club title.

=== Inter-county ===
Naughton played for Galway at both minor and under-21 levels, however, he had little success. He joined the county senior side in 1986 as Galway faced Cork in a second consecutive All-Ireland final appearance. In spite of Galway being the red-hot favourites, Naughton faced defeat as victory went to the Leesiders on that occasion. In 1987 Naughton won a National Hurling League medal before making another All-Ireland final appearance. That year the men from the West defeated Kilkenny giving Naughton an All-Ireland medal. 1988 saw Galway win a second All-Ireland final, this time with a defeat of Tipperary, giving Naughton a second All-Ireland medal. He added a second National League medal to his collection in 1989; however, a cruciate knee injury forced Naughton to retire from inter-county hurling in 1992.
