= David Hughes (hurler) =

Irish hurler

Personal information
- Native name: Daithí Ó hAodha (Irish)
- Born: 1966 (age 59–60) Banagher, County Offaly, Ireland
- Height: 6 ft 1 in (185 cm)

Sport
- Sport: Hurling
- Position: Goalkeeper
Club
- Years: Club
- St Rynagh's
Club titles
- Offaly titles: 4
- Leinster titles: 1
- All-Ireland Titles: 0
Inter-county
Years	County	Apps (scores)
1994-1997	Offaly	8 (0-00)
Inter-county titles
- Leinster titles: 2
- All-Irelands: 1
- NHL: 0
- All Stars: 0

David Hughes (born 1966) is an Irish hurling coach and former player. At club level, he played with St Rynagh's and at inter-county level with the Offaly senior hurling team.

== Playing career ==
Born in Banagher, County Offaly, Hughes first played hurling at juvenile and underage levels with the St Rynagh's club. He was part of the club's senior team that won four Offaly SHC titles between 1987 and 1993. Martin also won a Leinster Club SHC medal in 1993, following a defeat of Dicksboro in the final.

Hughes first appeared on the inter-county scene for Offaly as a member of the minor team in 1983. He later progressed to the under-21 team but ended his underage career without silverware.

Hughes made his senior team debut in Offaly's 1–18 to 0–14 win over Wexford in the 1994 Leinster SHC final. He was an unused substitute when Offaly subsequently beat Limerick by 3–16 to 2–13 in the 1994 All-Ireland SHC final. Hughes succeeded Jim Troy as first-choice goalkeeper the following year and won a second consecutive Leinster SHC medal, before a defeat by Clare in the 1995 All-Ireland SHC final. He was dropped from the team in favour of Stephen Byrne in 1998.

== Management career ==
Hughes served as a selector during Ken Hogan's tenure as St Rynagh's manager for their three successive Offaly SHC title victories between 2019 and 2021.

== Honours ==
=== Player ===
St Rynagh's

- Leinster Senior Club Hurling Championship (1): 1993
- Offaly Senior Hurling Championship (4): 1987, 1990, 1992, 1993

Offaly

- All-Ireland Senior Hurling Championship (1): 1994
- Leinster Senior Hurling Championship (2): 1994, 1995

=== Management ===
St Rynagh's

- Offaly Senior Hurling Championship (3): 2019, 2020, 2021
