= Hubert Rigney =

Irish hurler

Personal information
- Native name: Aodh Ó Roigne (Irish)
- Born: 30 July 1971 (age 55) Banagher, County Offaly, Ireland
- Height: 6 ft 0 in (183 cm)

Sport
- Sport: Hurling
- Position: Centre-back
Club
- Years: Club
- St Rynagh's
Club titles
- Offaly titles: 3
- Leinster titles: 1
Inter-county
Years	County	Apps (scores)
1990–2002	Offaly	29 (0-02)
Inter-county titles
- Leinster titles: 2
- All-Irelands: 2
- NHL: 1
- All Stars: 1

Hubert Rigney (born 30 July 1971) is an Irish former hurler. At club level, he played with St Rynagh's and at inter-county level with the Offaly senior hurling team. Rigney captained Offaly to the All-Ireland SHC title in 1998.

== Early life ==
Born and raised in Banagher, County Offaly, Rigney attended Banagher Vocational School and lined out in all grades of hurling during his time there. He won an All-Ireland Vocational Schools' SHC title in 1989, following a 1–12 to 2–06 win over Roscrea Vocational School in the final.

== Club career ==
Rigney began his club career at juvenile and underage levels with St Rynagh's, before progressing to the club's senior team. He won his first Offal SHC medal in 1990, after a 2–06 to 1–07 win over Birr in the final. Rigney won further Offaly SHC titles in 1992 and 1993. He was also part of the St Rynagh's team that beat Dicksboro by a point to win the Leinster Club SHC title in 1993.

== Inter-county career ==
Rigney first appeared on the inter-county scene for Offaly as a member of the minor team in 1988. He was left corner-back on the team that beat Clare by 2–16 to 1–12 in the 1989 All-Ireland MHC final. Rigney immediately progressed to the under-21 team and won consecutive Leinster U21HC medals in 1991 and 1992, however, these provincial wins were later followed by consecutive All-Ireland U21HC final defeats.

Rigney made his senior team debut in a National Hurling League game against Derry in November 1990. His debut season ended with Offaly winning their first ever National League title, after a two-point win over Wexford in the final. Rigney won his first Leinster SHC medal in 1994, before later claiming his first All-Ireland SHC medal after a 3–16 to 2–13 win over Limerick in what has become known as the five–minute final. He ended the season with an All-Star award.

After winning a second consecutive Leinster SHC medal in 1995, Rigney later lined out at centre-back in Offaly's 1–13 to 2–08 defeat by Clare in the 1995 All-Ireland SHC final. Three years later, he won a second All-Ireland SHC medal when, after losing out in the Leinster SHC final, he captained Offaly to a 2–16 to 1–13 win over Kilkenny in the 1998 All-Ireland SHC final, to become the first "back door" winners of the title.

Two years later, a series of injuries hampered Rigney and he was controversially omitted from the Offaly team that was beaten by Kilkenny in the 2000 All-Ireland SHC final. He later withdrew from both county and club hurling in protest at his omission, while his brother Michael also withdrew from both panels. Rigney rejoined the Offaly panel in March 2001, after a number of invitations from manager Michael Bond, Offaly County Board chairman Brendan Ward and the interventions of Brian Whelehan and Aidan Fogarty. He played his last game for Offaly in July 2002.

== Personal life ==
Rigney is involved in the Offaly branch of the Collins 22 Society, which pays tribute to Irish revolutionary leader Michael Collins.

== Honours ==
Banagher Vocational School

- All-Ireland Vocational Schools' Senior Hurling Championship (1): 1989

St Rynagh's

- Leinster Senior Club Hurling Championship (1): 1993
- Offaly Senior Hurling Championship (3): 1990, 1992, 1993

Offaly

- All-Ireland Senior Hurling Championship (2): 1994, 1998
- Leinster Senior Hurling Championship (2): 1994, 1995
- National Hurling League (1): 1990–91
- Leinster Under-21 Hurling Championship (2): 1991, 1992
- All-Ireland Minor Hurling Championship (1): 1989
- Leinster Minor Hurling Championship (1): 1989

Sporting positions
Preceded by	Offaly senior hurling team captain 1998	Succeeded by Brian Whelahan
Achievements
Preceded by Anthony Daly	All-Ireland SHC Final winning captain 1998	Succeeded by Mark Landers
