= Michael Rigney =

Irish hurler (born 1971)

Personal information
- Native name: Mícheal Ó Roigne (Irish)
- Born: 1973 (age 52–53) Banagher, County Offaly, Ireland

Sport
- Sport: Hurling
- Position: Right wing-back
Club
- Years: Club
- St Rynagh's
Club titles
- Offaly titles: 3
- Leinster titles: 1
- All-Ireland Titles: 0
Inter-county
Years	County	Apps (scores)
1995-1999	Offaly	0 (0-00)
Inter-county titles
- Leinster titles: 0
- All-Irelands: 1
- NHL: 0
- All Stars: 0

Michael Rigney (born 1973) is an Irish former hurler. At club level, he played with St Rynagh's and at inter-county level with the Offaly senior hurling team.

== Career ==
Rigney first played hurling at juvenile and underage levels with the St Rynagh's club, before progressing to adult level. He was part of the club's senior team that won three Offaly SHC titles between 1990 and 1993. Rigney also won a Leinster Club SHC medal in 1993, following a defeat of Dicksboro in the final. He stepped away from the team in 2000.

At inter-county level, Rigney first appeared for Offaly as a member of the minor team in 1991. He later progressed to the under-21 team, but ended his underage inter-county career without silverware. Rigney made his senior team debut in a National Hurling League game against Kilkenny in November 1995. He was a member of the extended panel when his brother, Hubert, captained Offaly to 2–16 to 1–13 win over Kilkenny to become the first "back door" winners of the All-Ireland SHC title in 1998.

== Honours ==
St Rynagh's

- Leinster Senior Club Hurling Championship (1): 1993
- Offaly Senior Hurling Championship (3): 1990, 1992, 1993

Offaly

- All-Ireland Senior Hurling Championship (1): 1998
