= Eunan Martin =

Irish hurler (born 1971)

Personal information
- Native name: Ádhamhnán Ó Máirtín (Irish)
- Born: 1971 (age 54–55) Banagher, County Offaly, Ireland
- Occupation: Sales rep

Sport
- Sport: Hurling
- Position: Right wing-forward
Club
- Years: Club
- St Rynagh's
Club titles
- Offaly titles: 3
- Leinster titles: 1
- All-Ireland Titles: 0
Inter-county
Years	County	Apps (scores)
1997-1999	Offaly	0 (0-00)
Inter-county titles
- Leinster titles: 0
- All-Irelands: 1
- NHL: 0
- All Stars: 0

Eunan Martin (born 1971) is an Irish hurling coach and former player. At club level, he played with St Rynagh's and at inter-county level with the Offaly senior hurling team.

== Playing career ==
Son of Damien Martin, who won All-Ireland SHC medals with Offaly in 1981 and 1985, Martin first played hurling at juvenile and underage levels with the St Rynagh's club. He was part of the club's senior team that won three Offaly SHC titles between 1990 and 1993. Martin also won a Leinster Club SHC medal in 1993, following a defeat of Dicksboro in the final.

Martin first appeared on the inter-county scene for Offaly as a member of the under-21 team. He won consecutive Leinster U21HC medals in 1991 and 1992, however, these provincial wins were subsequently followed by consecutive All-Ireland U21HC final defeats. Martin made his senior team debut in a National Hurling League game against Laois in May 1997. He was a member of the extended panel when Offaly beat Kilkenny by 2–16 to 1–13 to become the first "back door" winners of the All-Ireland SHC title in 1998.

== Management career ==
Martin served as Offaly's minor team manager in 2018. He later served as a selector during Ken Hogan's tenure as St Rynagh's manager for their three successive Offaly SHC title victories between 2019 and 2021.

== Honours ==
=== Player ===
St Rynagh's

- Leinster Senior Club Hurling Championship (1): 1993
- Offaly Senior Hurling Championship (3): 1990, 1992, 1993

Offaly

- All-Ireland Senior Hurling Championship (1): 1998
- Leinster Under-21 Hurling Championship (2): 1991, 1992

=== Management ===
St Rynagh's

- Offaly Senior Hurling Championship (3): 2019, 2020, 2021
