= 1983 All-Ireland Senior Club Hurling Championship final =

- Event: 1982–83 All-Ireland Senior Club Hurling Championship
| Loughgiel Shamrocks | St. Rynagh's |
| Loughgiel Shamrocks | St. Rynagh's |
| 1-8 | 2-5 |
- Date: 17 April 1983
- Venue: Croke Park, Dublin
- Referee: Noel O'Donoghue (Dublin)
- Attendance: 3,000

Replay
| Loughgiel Shamrocks | St. Rynagh's |
| 2-12 | 1-12 |
- Date: 24 April 1983
- Venue: Casement Park, Belfast
- Referee: Jimmy Rankins (Laois)
- Attendance: 6,000

The 1983 All-Ireland Senior Club Hurling Championship final was a hurling match played at Croke Park on 17 April 1983 to determine the winners of the 1982–83 All-Ireland Senior Club Hurling Championship, the 13th season of the All-Ireland Senior Club Hurling Championship, a tournament organised by the Gaelic Athletic Association for the champion clubs of the four provinces of Ireland. The final was contested by Loughgiel Shamrocks of Antrim and St. Rynagh's of Offaly, with the game ending in a 1-8 to 2-5 draw. The replay took place at Casement Park on 24 April 1983. Loughgiel Shamrocks won that game by 2-12 to 1-12.

The All-Ireland final was a unique occasion as it was the first ever championship meeting between Loughgiel Shamrocks and St. Rynagh's. It remains their only championship meeting at this level. Both sides were hoping to win their first All-Ireland title.

Victory for Loughgiel Shamrocks secured their first All-Ireland title. They became the 8th club to win the All-Ireland title, while they were the first, and to date only, Antrim representatives to claim the ultimate prize.

== Match details ==
=== Drawn match ===
17 April 1983

| Loughgiel Shamrocks | 1-8 - 2-5 | St. Rynagh's |
|---|---|---|
| B. Laverty 1-0, A. McNaughton 0-3 (2f and 1 '70'), M. O'Connell 0-2 (1sl and 1 '70'), M. Coyle 0-1, P. Carey Jnr. 0-1, A. McCarry 0-1. | | H. Dolan 1-1, A. Horan 1-0, P. Horan 0-2 (1f and 1 '70'), D. Devery 0-1, A. Fogarty 0-1. |

Croke Park, Dublin
Attendance: 3,000
Referee: N O'Donoghue (Dublin)

=== Replay ===
24 April 1983

| Loughgiel Shamrocks | 2-12 - 1-12 | St. Rynagh's |
|---|---|---|
| A. McCarry 1-3, B. Laverty 1-1, S. McNaughton 0-3, P. Carey Jnr. 0-2, P. Carey Snr. 0-1, A. McNaughton 0-1, M. O'Connell 0-1. | | P. Horan 1-2, D. Devery 0-3, A. Fogarty 0-3, H. Dolan 0-2, F. Kenny 0-1, A. Horan 0-1. |

Casement Park, Belfast
Attendance: 10,000
Referee: J Rankins (Laois)
