= Aidan Fogarty (Offaly hurler) =

Irish hurler and manager

Personal information
- Native name: Aodán Ó Fógartaigh (Irish)
- Born: 7 June 1958 (age 68) Banagher, County Offaly, Ireland
- Occupation: Sales rep
- Height: 5 ft 10 in (178 cm)

Sport
- Sport: Hurling
- Position: Right wing-back
Club
- Years: Club
- St Rynagh's
Club titles
- Offaly titles: 8
- Leinster titles: 2
Inter-county
Years	County	Apps (scores)
1977-1991	Offaly	37 (0-04)
Inter-county titles
- Leinster titles: 7
- All-Irelands: 2
- NHL: 1
- All Stars: 2

Aidan Fogarty (born 7 June 1958) is an Irish hurling manager and former player. At club level, he played with St Rynagh's and at inter-county level with the Offaly senior hurling team.

== Playing career ==
At club level, Fogarty first played hurling at juvenile and underage levels with the St Rynagh's club in Banagher. He was still only a minor when he won his first set of Offaly SHC medals in 1975 and 1976. Fogarty won another consecutive set of Offaly SHC medals in 1981 and 1982. The latter win was subsequently converted into a Leinster Club SHC title, however, St Rynagh's were beaten by Loughgiel Shamrocks in the 1983 All-Ireland Club SHC final replay.

Fogarty won his fifth Offaly SHC medal as team captain in 1987. A sixth title followed in 1990, before captaining the club to the title, once again, in 1992. Fogarty won an eighth Offaly SHC medal in 1993, before ending his career with a second Leinster Club SHC title victory.

At inter-county level, Fogarty first played for Offaly during a two-year tenure with the minor team. He later spent three consecutive years with the under-21 team and won a Leinster U21HC medal in 1978. Fogarty made his senior team debut in a National Hurling League game against Galway in February 1977.

Fogarty was part of the Offaly team that beat Kilkenny to win their inaugural Leinster SHC title in 1980. He claimed a second consecutive Leinster SHC title the following year, before lining out at wing-back in Offaly's 2–12 to 0–15 win over Galway in the 1981 All-Ireland SHC final. Fogarty won another consective set of Leinster SHC medals in 1984 and 1985. He won a second All-Ireland SHC medal in 1985 following Offaly's 2–11 to 1–12 win over Galway.

Fogarty won a further three consecutive Leinster SHC medals between 1988 and 1990, while he also claimed a second All-Star in 1989. He captained Leinster to victory over Connacht in the 1988 Railway Cup final. Fogarty played his 114th and final game for Offaly in June 1991.

== Management career ==
Fogarty was involved in coaching at all levels with the O'Loughlin Gaels club in Kilkenny. His first spell as a selector with the senior team saw O'Loughlin Gaels win Kilkenny SHC titles in 2001 and 2003, as well as a Leinster Club SHC title. Fogarty managed O'Loughlin Gaels to the Kilkenny SHC title in 2016.

== Honours ==
=== Player ===
St Rynagh's

- Leinster Senior Club Hurling Championship (2): 1982, 1993
- Offaly Senior Hurling Championship (8): 1975, 1976, 1981, 1982, 1987 (c), 1990, 1992 (c), 1993

Offaly

- All-Ireland Senior Hurling Championship (2): 1981, 1985
- Leinster Senior Hurling Championship (7): 1980, 1981, 1984, 1985, 1988, 1989, 1990
- National Hurling League (1): 1990–91
- Leinster Under-21 Hurling Championship (1): 1978

Awards

- All-Stars (2): 1982, 1989

=== Management ===
O'Loughlin Gaels

- Leinster Senior Club Hurling Championship (1): 2003
- Kilkenny Senior Hurling Championship (2): 2001, 2003, 2016

Achievements
Preceded by Conor Hayes	Railway Cup final winning captain 1988	Succeeded by Joe Cooney
