= Stephen Byrne (hurler) =

Irish hurler (born 1976)

Personal information
- Native name: Stiofán Ó Broin (Irish)
- Born: 17 July 1976 (age 50) Kilcormac, County Offaly, Ireland
- Occupation: Sales rep
- Height: 5 ft 10 in (178 cm)

Sport
- Sport: Hurling
- Position: Goalkeeper
Club
- Years: Club
- Kilcormac–Killoughey
Club titles
- Offaly titles: 0
Inter-county
| Years | County | Apps (scores) |
| 1998-2003 | Offaly | 22 (0-00) |
Inter-county titles
- Leinster titles: 0
- All-Irelands: 1
- NHL: 0
- All Stars: 1

Stephen Byrne (born 17 July 1976) is an Irish hurling manager, selector and former player. At club level, he played with Kilcormac–Killoughey and at inter-county level with the Offaly senior hurling team.

== Club career ==
Byrne first played hurling at juvenile and underage levels with the Kilcormac–Killoughey club. After a very successful underage career, which saw him win multiple Offaly MAHC and U21HC titles, he progressed to adult level. Byrne lined out in goal when Birr beat Kilcormac–Killoughey by 3–11 to 2–07 in the 2002 Offaly SHC final.

== Inter-county career ==
Byrne first appeared on the inter-county scene with Offaly as a dual player at minor level in 1993. He later spent three successive years with Offaly's under-21 team in hurling, but ended his underage inter-county career without silverware.

Byrne made his senior team debut in a National Hurling League game against Antrim in March 1998 and succeeded David Hughes as Offaly's first-choice goalkeeper that season. He won an All-Ireland SHC medal when, after losing out in the Leinster SHC final, he lined out in goal for Offaly's 2–16 to 1–13 win over Kilkenny in the 1998 All-Ireland SHC final, to become the first "back door" winners of the title. Byrne ended the season with an All-Star award and was also named Young Hurler of the Year.

Two years later, Byrne was again in goal for Offaly's 5–15 to 1–14 defeat by Kilkenny in the 2000 All-Ireland SHC final. He was dropped from the starting fifteen for Offaly's 2003 Leinster SHC semi-final defeat by Wexford and, after being reinstated for a later game against Limerick, he left the panel at the end of the season.

== Inter-provincial career ==
Byrne's performances at inter-county level for Offaly resulted in his selection for the Leinster inter-provincial team. He won a Railway Cup medal in 1998, following Leinster's 0–16 to 2–09 defear of Connacht in the final. Byrne claimed a second Railway Cup medal in 2002, when he came on as a substitute for James McGarry in the 4–15 to 3–17 win over Munster.

== Management career ==
Byrne was appointed manager of the Offaly under-21 team in April 2009. His two seasons in charge ended with consecutive defeats by Kilkenny. Byrne made the step up to Offaly's senior team in November 2012, when he joined Ollie Baker's management team as a selector following the departure of Paudge Mulhare. At club level, Byrne has taken charge of a number of teams and managed Kilcormac–Killoughey to the Offaly SHC title in 2017, following a 2-16 to 1-16 win over St Rynagh's in the final.

== Honours ==
=== Player ===
Kilcormac–Killoughey

- Offaly Under-21 Hurling Championship (5): 1994, 1995, 1996, 1997

Offaly

- All-Ireland Senior Hurling Championship (1): 1998

Leinster

- Railway Cup (2): 1998, 2002

Awards

- All-Stars Young Hurler of the Year (1): 1998
- All-Star (1): 1998

=== Management ===
Kilcormac–Killoughey

- Offaly Senior Hurling Championship (1): 2017

Awards
| Preceded by Eugene O'Neill | GAA Young Hurler of the Year; 1998 | Succeeded by Diarmuid O'Sullivan |
Sporting positions
| Preceded by Pádraig Horan | Offaly under-21 hurling team manager 2009-2011 | Succeeded by Paddy Kirwan |
