= Aidan Fogarty =

Aidan Fogarty may refer to:

- Aidan Fogarty (Kilkenny hurler) (born 1982)
- Aidan Fogarty (Offaly hurler) (born 1958)
