= Aodh Horan =

Irish hurler

Personal information
- Native name: Aodh Ó hÓráin (Irish)
- Born: Banagher, County Offaly, Ireland

Sport
- Sport: Hurling
- Position: Left corner-back
Club
- Years: Club
- St Rynagh's
Club titles
- Leinster titles: 3
Inter-county*
| Years | County | Apps (scores) |
| 1978-1979 | Offaly | 1 (0-00) |
Inter-county titles
- Leinster titles: 0
- All-Irelands: 0
- NHL: 0
- All Stars: 0
- *Inter County team apps and scores correct as of 18:16, 30 June 2014.

Aodh Horan is an Irish former hurler who played as a left corner-back for the Offaly senior team.

Born in Banagher, County Offaly, Horan first played competitive hurling in his youth. He made his senior debut with Offaly during the 1978-79 National League and immediately became a regular member of the team. During his brief career he experienced little success.

At club level Horan is a three-time Leinster medallist with St Rynagh's. He also won numerous championship medals with the club.

His retirement came following the conclusion of the 1979 championship.

== Honours ==
=== Team ===
St Rynagh's

- Leinster Senior Club Hurling Championship (2): 1970, 1972, 1982
