= Lusmagh =

Civil parish in County Offaly, Ireland

Lusmagh Lusmhaigh
- Civil parish
- Interactive map of Lusmagh
- Location in Ireland
- Coordinates: 53°10′25″N 8°01′09″W
- Country: Ireland
- Province: Leinster
- County: Offaly
- Barony: Garrycastle
- Time zone: UTC+0 (WET)
  - Summer (DST): UTC−1 (IST (WEST))
- Website: www.lusmagh.com

Lusmagh (Irish: Lusmhaigh) is a civil parish in County Offaly, Ireland, bounded by three rivers: the Shannon, Lusmagh and Little Brosna to the west, east and south respectively. The town of Banagher is northeast across the River Lusmagh. Lusmagh was considered part of County Galway in 1628 and Connacht until 1373; the Lusmagh Roman Catholic parish is the only one in the Diocese of Clonfert east of the Shannon. According to the history of the O'Kellys of Hy-Many, Lusmhaigh means the plain of the healing herbs. In Christian times, the parish was named Cill Mochonna, "the Church of Mo Chua". Saint Mo Chua of Balla, also called Crónán, founded a monastery in 600 on the site of Cloghan Castle. The name Lusmagh was restored to the Catholic parish around 1810. Its parish church, named after St. Crónán, is about three miles southwest of Banagher.

== Cloghan Castle ==
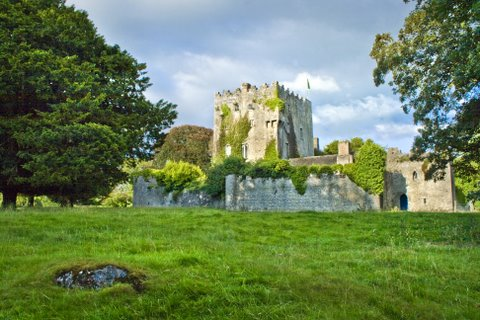
Cloghan Castle

Cloghan Castle was originally built as a monastery by St. Crónán in 600. The Normans fortified the remains of the monastery in 1203 by building a defensive wall around it, a part of which still exists. The Gaelic Chieftain Eoghan O’Madden constructed the castle keep in 1336. His kingdom stretched to the west as far as Loughrea in County Galway. The castle was attacked and razed in 1595 by Sir William Russell, the Lord Deputy, and confiscated for the Crown. It was granted, together with 6,000 acres, to Sir John Moore in 1601 and he was responsible for the existing oak beamed roof. Sir John was sacked from his Government post when it was discovered that he was a Catholic. The castle remained in the Moore family until it was taken by Cromwellian soldiers in 1654. They remained in residence until 1683 when King Charles II granted it to Garret Moore. It was garrisoned by the Jacobites in 1689 and 1690 and remains of their gun emplacements can still be seen in the grounds. The Moores were good landlords and tried their best to alleviate the suffering of their tenants in the Great Famine of 1845 to 1847. As a result of the Famine, the Moores became bankrupt and had to sell the lands. It was purchased by Dr. Robert Graves, the Dublin doctor who discovered Graves' disease of the thyroid, at the insistence of his wife. He died a year after purchasing the castle. After his death, his widow evicted up to 100 tenants from the property. His grandson sold it in 1908 before emigrating to Australia, where his descendants still live.

The land of Lusmagh was eventually taken over by the Land Commission, and divided among the local tenant farmers around 1910.

== People ==
Lusmagh was the birthplace of Michael Larkin (1837–1867) one of the three Manchester Martyrs. He was born on the properties of Cloghan Castle, the entrance of which is just past St. Cronan's Church and parish house.

== Hurling ==
Lusmagh is home to several inter-county hurlers. Joachim Kelly, Brendan Bermingham, Jim Troy, Brendan Kelly, Pat Temple and John Troy have all won All-Ireland Senior Hurling medals with Offaly as well as numerous provincial titles. Brendan Kelly, Ronald Byrne and John Troy have also won All-Ireland Minor medals, with John Troy having the distinction of being one of only three men in the history of the GAA to win three all-Ireland Minor medals.

Lusmagh GAA club won their one and only Senior County Hurling title in 1989, having been promoted from the Junior ranks in 1973. They defeated Seir Kieran in the final by one point. Joachim, Jim and John Kelly and Brendan Bermingham figured on both the successful teams of 1973 and 1989.

Lusmagh have also won two All-Ireland 11-a-side titles, an annual club competition which is held in Carlow, beating neighbours St Rynagh's of Banagher in the inaugural competition in 1990 and Ferns in 2000.

== In popular culture ==
In 1908, Edward Dolan, who was then 20 years old, left Lusmagh as an emigrant to Australia. A song he wrote about his departure, titled Lusmagh Fields So Green, was recorded by Johnny McEvoy.
