= Devery =

Devery is both a given name and surname:

- Devery Freeman (1913–2005), American writer and union activist
- Devery Henderson (born 1982), American football player
- Dermot Devery, Irish hurler
- Pat Devery (born 1922), Australian rugby league footballer
- Terry Devery (born 1938), Australian rules footballer
- William Stephen Devery (1854–1919), American police chief

== See also ==
- Deverry
