= Dermot Devery =

Irish hurler

Personal information
- Native name: Diarmuid Ó Dairbhre (Irish)
- Born: Banagher, County Offaly, Ireland

Sport
- Sport: Hurling
- Position: Right wing-forward
Club
- Years: Club
- St Rynagh's
Club titles
- Leinster titles: 1
Inter-county*
Years	County	Apps (scores)
1979-1982	Offaly	0 (0-00)
Inter-county titles
- Leinster titles: 0
- All-Irelands: 0
- NHL: 0
- All Stars: 0
- *Inter County team apps and scores correct as of 20:22, 30 June 2014.

Dermot Devery is an Irish former hurler who played as a right wing-forward for the Offaly senior team.

Born in Banagher, County Offaly, Devery first played competitive hurling in his youth. He made his senior debut with Offaly during the 1979-80 National League. During his brief career he experienced little success.

At club level Devery is a one-time Leinster medallist with St Rynagh's. He also won numerous championship medals with the club.

== Honours ==
St Rynagh's

- Leinster Senior Club Hurling Championship (1): 1982
