= Conor McGlone =

Irish hurler

Personal information
- Born: 1973 (age 52–53) Birr, County Offaly, Ireland

Sport
- Sport: Hurling
- Position: Midfield
Club
- Years: Club
- 1991–1999: Birr
Club titles
- Offaly titles: 4
- Leinster titles: 4
- All-Ireland Titles: 2
Inter-county*
Years	County	Apps (scores)
1993–1996	Offaly	1 (0-00)
Inter-county titles
- Leinster titles: 0
- All-Irelands: 0
- NHL: 0
- All Stars: 0
- *Inter County team apps and scores correct as of 12:30, 17 November 2024.

Conor McGlone (born 1973) is an Irish former hurler. At club level he played with Birr and was also a member of the Offaly senior hurling team.

== Career ==
McGlone played his club hurling with Birr and had a successful career during a golden age for the club. His four Offaly SHC victories were subsequently converted into four Leinster Club SHC successes. McGlone was also part of the Birr team that won All-Ireland Club SHC titles in 1995 and 1998. His club career ended shortly after this.

At inter-county level, McGlone first played for Offaly during a two-year stint with the minor team in 1990 and 1991. He later had three successive seasons with the under-21 team but ended his underage career without success. McGlone made a number of National Hurling League appearances and one Leinster SHC appearance for the senior team between 1993 and 1996.

== Honours ==
Birr

- All-Ireland Senior Club Hurling Championship: 1995, 1998
- Leinster Senior Club Hurling Championship: 1991, 1994, 1998, 1999
- Offaly Senior Hurling Championship: 1991, 1994, 1997, 1999
