= Brendan Bermingham =

Irish retired sportsperson

Personal information
- Native name: Breandán Mac Fheorais (Irish)
- Born: 2 May 1956 (age 70) Lusmagh, County Offaly, Ireland
- Occupation: Fitter
- Height: 5 ft 10 in (178 cm)

Sport
- Sport: Hurling
- Position: Centre-forward
Club
- Years: Club
- Lusmagh
Club titles
- Offaly titles: 1
Inter-county
Years	County	Apps (scores)
1978-1986	Offaly	25 (5-11)
Inter-county titles
- Leinster titles: 4
- All-Irelands: 2
- NHL: 0
- All Stars: 0

Brendan Bermingham (born 2 May 1956) is an Irish former hurler. At club level, he played for Lusmagh and at inter-county level with the Offaly senior hurling team.

== Career ==
Bermingham first played hurling at juvenile and underage levels with the Lusmagh club, before progressing to adult level. He was part of the club's senior team that won their first and only Offaly SHC title in 1989, following a 1–11 to 1–10 win over Seir Kieran.

At inter-county level, Bermingham first played for Offaly as a member of the under-21 team in 1977. He made his senior team debut in a National Hurling League game against Wexford in October 1977.

Bermingham was part of the Offaly team that beat Kilkenny to win their inaugural Leinster SHC title in 1980. He claimed a second consecutive Leinster SHC title the following year, before lining out at centre-forward in Offaly's 2–12 to 0–15 win over Galway in the 1981 All-Ireland SHC final. Bermingham won another consective set of Leinster SHC medals in 1984 and 1985. He won a second All-Ireland SHC medal in 1985 following Offaly's 2–11 to 1–12 win over Galway.

== Honours ==
Lusmagh

- Offaly Senior Hurling Championship (1): 1989

Offaly

- All-Ireland Senior Hurling Championship (2): 1981, 1985
- Leinster Senior Hurling Championship (4): 1980, 1981, 1984, 1985
