= Paudge Mulhare =

Irish hurler and Gaelic footballer

Personal information
- Native name: Pádraig Ó Maoilchéire (Irish)
- Born: 1944 (age 81–82) Banagher, County Offaly, Ireland

Sport
- Football Position: Right corner-forward
- Hurling Position: Forward
Club
- Years: Club
- 1960s-1970s: St Rynagh's
Club titles
	Football	Hurling
Offaly titles	0	10
Leinster titles	0	2
All-Ireland titles	0	0
Inter-county
Years	County	Apps (scores)
1965-1967 1966-1975	Offaly (F); Offaly (H)	3; 19
Inter-county titles
	Football	Hurling
Leinster Titles	0	0
All-Ireland Titles	0	0
League titles	0	0
All-Stars	0	0

Paudge Mulhare (born 1944) is an Irish former hurler and Gaelic footballer who played as a forward for both Offaly senior teams from 1965 until 1975.

Sporting positions
Preceded by Pad Joe Whelahan	Offaly Senior Hurling Manager; 1989-1990	Succeeded by Pádraig Horan
