= Damien Martin =

Irish hurler (born 1946)

Personal information
- Native name: Damien Ó Máirtín (Irish)
- Born: 2 October 1946 (age 80) Banagher, County Offaly, Ireland
- Occupation: Estate agent
- Height: 5 ft 10 in (178 cm)

Sport
- Sport: Hurling
- Position: Goalkeeper
Club
- Years: Club
- 1964–1987: St Rynagh's
Club titles
- Offaly titles: 12
- Leinster titles: 3
- All-Ireland Titles: 2
Inter-county
Years	County	Apps (scores)
1964–1986	Offaly	37 (0-00)
Inter-county titles
- Leinster titles: 3
- All-Irelands: 2
- NHL: 0
- All Stars: 1

Damien Martin (born 2 October 1946) is an Irish former hurler who played as a goalkeeper for the Offaly senior hurling team.

Born in Banagher, County Offaly, Martin first arrived on the inter-county scene when he first linked up with the Offaly minor team, before later joining the under-21 side. Martin made his senior debut during the 1964–65 National League and later became a regular member of the team. During a career that spanned three decades he won one All-Ireland medal and three Leinster medals. He was an All-Ireland runner-up on one occasion.

As a member of the Leinster inter-provincial team at various times, Martin won three Railway Cup medals. At club level he is a three-time Leinster medallist with St Rynagh's. In addition to this he also won thirteen championship medals.

Throughout his career Martin made 37 championship appearances for Offaly. His retirement came following the conclusion of the 1986 championship.

Martin was the first recipient of an All-Star at the inaugural awards in 1971.

His son, Eunan, was also an All-Ireland medalist with Offaly.

== Playing career ==
=== Club ===
Martin experienced much success with St Rynagh's in a club career that spanned three decades. He won a remarkable thirteen championship medals, all but one of which was won on the field of play.

In 1965 he was just out of the minor grade when he won his first championship medal in the senior grade. A defeat of Coolderry earned St Rynagh's their first ever championship title. Further success followed in 1966 as St Rynagh's retained the Seán Robbins Cup.

Two years later in 1968 Martin added a third championship medal to his collection. A 1–12 to 3–4 defeat of Coolderry was the first of three championship titles in succession for St Rynagh's. In 1970 Martin added a Leinster medal to his collection following a 4–10 to 2–9 defeat of Rathnure. St Rynagh's later faced Roscrea in the inaugural All-Ireland final, however, Martin's side were defeated by 4–5 to 2–5.

Four county championships-in-a-row proved beyond St Rynagh's, however, the club bounced back in 1972. A defeat of Kinnitty in the county decider kick-started a remarkable run of success that yielded a record-breaking five championships in succession. As well as this Martin collected a second Leinster medal in 1972 as St Rynagh's narrowly defeated old rivals Rathnure by 5–5 to 2–13.

After a number of years out of the spotlight, St Rynagh's returned to the top table once again in 1981. A defeat of Kinnitty gave Martin his eleventh championship medal.

St Rynagh's retained the title in 1982 with Martin securing a remarkable twelfth championship medal. He later won a third Leinster medal as St Rynagh's narrowly defeated Buffer's Alley by 1–16 to 2–10.

Martin finished off his club hurling career in 1987 when he captured his thirteenth championship medal following a defeat of Seir Kieran. He was a non-playing substitute that year as David Hughes took over as first-choice 'keeper.

=== Inter-county ===
Martin first came to prominence on the inter-county scene as a member of the Offaly minor hurling team in the early 1960s. He enjoyed little success in this grade before later joining the Offaly under-21 team. With this team he lined out in the Leinster decider of 1967, with Dublin providing the opposition. That game was a close affair, however, Dublin claimed a 2–10 to 2–9 victory.

By this stage Martin had already made the break onto the Offaly senior team. He made his debut in the senior grade in a National Hurling League game in 1964. He was only seventeen years-old.

In 1969 Offaly reached their first ever Leinster decider with Martin playing in goals. Kilkenny provided the opposition on that occasion. Many expected Offaly to be wiped out by 'the Cats', however, the game was a lot closer than people expected. Kilkenny's goal-scoring abilities proved the key to success as they won by 3–9 to 0–16.

Two years later in 1971 Offaly were still languishing in the doldrums of provincial hurling. In spite of this, Martin's skill as a goalkeeper was recognised when he took the number one spot on the inaugural All-Star team.

In 1980 Offaly emerged from the doldrums to qualify for only their second provincial decider in fifty years. Reigning All-Ireland champions provided the opposition, however, a remarkable 3–17 to 5–10 victory gave Martin his first Leinster medal. Offaly's dream season came to an end with a defeat by eventual champions Galway in the All-Ireland semi-final.

Offaly proved that their success was more than a flash in the pan by reaching the provincial final again in 1981. Offaly defeated Wexford by 3–12 to 2–13, giving Martin a second Leinster medal. This win allowed Offaly to advance to a first All-Ireland final with reigning champions Galway. After fourteen minutes Pat Carroll scored the opening goal of the game for Offaly, however, neither side built up a strong lead. Straight after the interval goalkeeper Damien Martin was doing great work when he batted out an almost certain Galway goal. With just over twenty minutes left in the game Galway led by six points, however, the team failed to score for the rest of the match. Offaly, on the other hand, ate into this lead. Johnny Flaherty's controversial hand-passed goal with three minutes was the deciding score of the game. At the full-time whistle Offaly were the winners by 2–12 to 0–15. It was a first All-Ireland medal for Martin

After suffering back-to-back Leinster final defeats to Kilkenny, Offaly triumphed once again in 1984. A 1–15 to 2–11 defeat of Wexford gave Martin a third Leinster medal. Offaly subsequently advanced to the centenary All-Ireland final at Semple Stadium in Thurles. On the day, however, Cork were far too strong for Horan's team. Although far from being a classic game Offaly were defeated by 3–16 to 1–12.

In 1985 Martin lost his place on the team to John Troy. In spite of this he was still a member of the panel as he collected his fourth Leinster winners' title and a second All-Ireland winners' medal as a non-playing substitute.

Martin returned as first-choice goalkeeper again in 1986 as Offaly lined out in an impressive seventh Leinster decider in-a-row. Kilkenny were the opponents on that occasion, however, Offaly were now a team in decline. A 4–10 to 1–11 score line gave victory to "the Cats" and knocked Offaly out of the championship. After 22 years in senior hurling Martin retired from inter-county activity following this defeat.

=== Inter-provincial ===
Martin also lined out with Leinster in the inter-provincial hurling competition. He first came to prominence as a substitute with his province in 1971 as Leinster defeated Munster by 2–17 to 2–15. Martin added a second consecutive Railway Cup medal to his collection in 1972 following another win over Munster. It was 1979 before he picked up his third and final winners' medal in that competition, as Connacht were defeated by four points.

== Honours ==
St Rynagh's

- Leinster Senior Club Hurling Championship (3): 1970, 1973, 1982
- Offaly Senior Club Hurling Championship (13): 1965, 1966, 1968, 1969, 1970, 1972, 1973, 1974, 1975, 1976, 1981, 1982, 1987 (sub)

Offaly

- All-Ireland Senior Hurling Championship (1): 1981
- Leinster Senior Hurling Championship (3): 1980, 1981, 1984

Leinster

- Railway Cup (3): 1971, 1972, 1979
