= Michael Hogan (hurler) =

Irish hurler (1968–2024)

Personal information
- Native name: Mícheál Ó hÓgáin (Irish)
- Born: 1968 Birr, County Offaly, Ireland
- Died: 10 November 2024 (aged 56) Beaumont, Dublin, Ireland
- Occupation: Builder

Sport
- Sport: Hurling
- Position: Corner-back
Club
- Years: Club
- Birr
Club titles
- Offaly titles: 2
- Leinster titles: 2
- All-Ireland Titles: 1
Inter-county
Years	County	Apps (scores)
1989–1991	Offaly	0 (0-00)
Inter-county titles
- Leinster titles: 0
- All-Irelands: 0
- NHL: 1
- All Stars: 0

Michael Hogan (1968 – 10 November 2024) was an Irish hurler. At club level he played with Birr and was also a member of the Offaly senior hurling team.

Hogan had a successful career across various levels. An All-Ireland Club SHC-winner with Birr, he captained Offaly to their very first All-Ireland MHC title in 1986. Hogan later lined out with the senior team and was part of the National Hurling League-winning team in 1991.

Hogan died on 10 November 2024, at the age of 56.

== Honours ==
St Brendan's Community School

- All-Ireland Colleges Senior Hurling Championship: 1986 (c)
- Leinster Colleges Senior Hurling Championship: 1985, 1986 (c)

Birr

- All-Ireland Senior Club Hurling Championship: 1995
- Leinster Senior Club Hurling Championship: 1991, 1994
- Offaly Senior Hurling Championship: 1991, 1994

Offaly

- National Hurling League: 1990–91
- Leinster Under-21 Hurling Championship: 1989
- All-Ireland Minor Hurling Championship: 1986 (c)
- Leinster Minor Hurling Championship: 1986 (c)
