= Jim Troy (hurler) =

Irish hurler

Personal information
- Native name: Séamus Ó Troithigh (Irish)
- Nickname: Big Jim
- Born: 11 April 1960 (age 66) Lusmagh, County Offaly, Ireland
- Occupation: Bord na Móna engineer
- Height: 5 ft 9 in (175 cm)

Sport
- Sport: Hurling
- Position: Goalkeeper
Club
- Years: Club
- Lusmagh
Club titles
- Offaly titles: 1
Inter-county
| Years | County | Apps (scores) |
| 1981-1994 | Offaly | 26 (0-00) |
Inter-county titles
- Leinster titles: 7
- All-Irelands: 3
- NHL: 1
- All Stars: 0

James Troy (born 11 April 1960) is an Irish retired hurler who played for club side Lusmagh and at inter-county level with the Offaly senior hurling team.

== Career ==
Born in Lusmagh, County Offaly, Troy first came to prominence during a two-year spell as goalkeeper with the Offaly minor team. After a period with the under-21 side, he joined the Offaly senior team as understudy to Damien Martin during the 1981-82 National League. Troy claimed his first silverware in 1984 when Offaly won the Leinster Championship. He took over as first-choice goalkeeper the following year and ended the season as an All-Ireland Championship-winner after a defeat of Galway in the final. Troy won a further three provincial titles between 1988 and 1990, the last of which saw him captain the team as a result of Lusmagh's County Championship success the previous year. The success continued with Offaly claiming the 1990-91 league. Troy won a sixth provincial medal in 1994 before ending the season with a second All-Ireland winners' medal alongside his brother John. His inclusion on the Leinster team saw him claim two Railway Cup medals.

== Honours ==
Lusmagh

- Offaly Senior Hurling Championship: 1989

Offaly

- All-Ireland Senior Hurling Championship: 1981, 1985, 1994
- Leinster Senior Hurling Championship: 1981, 1984, 1985, 1988, 1989, 1990 (c), 1994
- National Hurling League: 1990-91

Leinster

- Railway Cup: 1988, 1993

Sporting positions
| Preceded by Mark Corrigan | Offaly Senior Hurling Captain; 1990 | Succeeded by |
