= 1987 Offaly Senior Hurling Championship =

Annual hurling competition season

- Champions: St Rynagh's (13th title); Aidan Fogarty (captain)
- Runners-up: Seir Kieran; Noel Bergin (captain)

The 1987 Offaly Senior Hurling Championship was the 90th staging of the Offaly Senior Hurling Championship since its establishment by the Offaly County Board in 1896.

Coolderry entered the championship as the defending champions.

The final was played on 27 September 1987 at St Brendan's Park in Birr, between St Rynagh's and Seir Kieran, in what was their first ever meeting in the final. St Rynagh's won the match by 0–11 to 0–09 to claim their 13th championship title overall and a first championship title in six years.

== Results ==
=== Final ===
27 September 1987 Final	St Rynagh's	0-11 - 0-09	Seir Kieran	St Brendan's Park
