= Martin Hanamy =

Irish hurler

Personal information
- Native name: Máirtín Ó hAinmidh (Irish)
- Born: 21 November 1966 (age 59) Cloghan, County Offaly, Ireland
- Occupation: Carpenter
- Height: 5 ft 10 in (178 cm)

Sport
- Sport: Hurling
- Position: Left corner-back
Club
- Years: Club
- 1984-2006: St Rynagh's
Club titles
- Offaly titles: 4
- Leinster titles: 1
Inter-county
Years	County	Apps (scores)
1986-1999	Offaly	39
Inter-county titles
- Leinster titles: 5
- All-Irelands: 2
- NHL: 1
- All Stars: 3

Martin Hanamy (born 21 November 1966) is an Irish former hurler who played as a left corner-back for the Offaly senior team.

Martin made his first appearance for the team during the 1986-87 National League and remained a stalwart of the team until his retirement after the 1999 championship. During that time he won two All-Ireland medals, five Leinster medals, one National League medals and three All-Star awards. In 1994 Hanamy captained the team to the All-Ireland title.

At club level Hanamy is a one-time Leinster medalist with the St Ryangh's club. In addition to this he has also won four county club championship medals.

== Playing career ==
=== Club ===
After experiencing some success in the various juvenile grades, Hanamy made the St Ryangh's senior team by the mid-1980s. He won his first county club championship title in 1987 following a defeat of Seir Kieran.

In 1990 Hanamy was club captain when St Ryangh's defeated Birr to give him a second county championship medal.

After surrendering the title, St Rynagh's bounced back in 1992. A defeat of Lusmagh gave Hanamy his third county championship. He picked up a fourth winners' medal in 1993 as St Rynagh's retained the title after a defeat of Birr. Hanamy later won a Leinster medal after a one-point defeat of Dicksboro.

=== Inter-county ===
Hanamy was selected for the Offaly minor and under 21 hurling sides. however, he was unlucky in missing out on a really big prize. In 1986, the Offaly minor hurlers won the All-Ireland Minor Hurling Championship title, however, Hanamy was 19 years old and not eligible to play.

Hanamy made his senior hurling debut for Offaly in 1987. From 1988 to 1990, he collected three consecutive Leinster titles; however, Offaly were defeated in the subsequent All-Ireland semi-final on all three occasions. In the 1989 All-Ireland semi-final Offaly lost to an unfancied Antrim who were later trounced by Tipperary in the championship decider. Two years later in 1991 Hanamy captured a National Hurling League title, Offaly's first. Three years later in 1994 Hanamy was captain of Offaly and he won his fourth Leinster title. Offaly later progressed to the All-Ireland final where they played Limerick. With four minutes to go Offaly were trailing by five points; however, a scoring spree in the remaining time resulted in the side actually winning the game by 6 points. Offaly manager Éamonn Cregan had orchestrated a win over has native county and Hanamy finally collected his first All-Ireland medal.

In 1995 Hanamy captured another Leinster medal in a final against Kilkenny. Hanamy's side later went on to lose the All-Ireland final to Clare, who won their first All-Ireland title since 1914. In 1998, Hanamy's side reached the Leinster final but lost to Kilkenny. This defeat prompted their manager, Babs Keating, to describe the Offaly hurlers as "sheep in a heap", and he promptly resigned. However, they overcame Antrim in the All-Ireland quarter-final and qualified to meet Clare in the semi-final. The first game ended in a draw and had to be replayed, however, the replay was ended early because of a time-keeping error by the referee. Following a protest on the pitch of Croke Park by the Offaly supporters it was decided that Clare and Offaly would meet for a third time. Hanamy's side won the third game and qualified to play Kilkenny in the final. Offaly reversed the Leinster final defeat by winning the All-Ireland final by 6 points. Hanamy had won his second All-Ireland medal. In 1999, Offaly once again reached the latter stages of the All-Ireland championship, however, they were beaten by Cork in the All-Ireland semi-final. Hanamy retired from inter-county hurling following this defeat.

Sporting positions
Preceded by	Offaly Senior Hurling Captain; 1994	Succeeded by Johnny Pilkington
Achievements
Preceded by Eddie O'Connor (Kilkenny)	All Ireland Senior Hurling Final winning captain 1994	Succeeded by Anthony Daly (Clare)
