= 1993 Offaly Senior Hurling Championship =

Annual hurling competition season

- Champions: St Rynagh's (16th title); David Hughes (captain)
- Runners-up: Birr; Daithí Regan (captain)

The 1993 Offaly Senior Hurling Championship was the 96th staging of the Offaly Senior Hurling Championship since its establishment by the Offaly County Board in 1896.

St Rynagh's entered the championship as the defending champions.

The final was played on 26 September 1993 at St Brendan's Park in Birr, between St Rynagh's and Birr, in what was their fifth meeting in the final overall. St Rynagh's won the match by 1–16 to 1–14 to claim their 16th championship title overall and a second championship title in succession.

== Results ==
=== Semi-finals ===
11 September 1993 Semi-final	St Rynagh's	2-19 - 1-12	Lusmagh	O'Connor Park
	M Duignan 1-3, F Dolan 1-2, R Mannion 0-4, M Conneely 0-4, T Moylan 0-2, A Fogarty 0-2, D Devery 0-1, H Rigney 0-1.		P Temple 1-1, B Troy 0-4, John Troy 0-3, F Larkin 0-1, R Byrne 0-1, K Dalton 0-1, B Kelly 0-1.

12 September 1993 Semi-final	Birr	1-17 - 2-12	Kinnitty	O'Connor Park
	A Cahill 0-4, Brian Whelehan 0-4, D Pilkington 0-3, M Feenane 0-3, O O'Neill 1-0, C McGlone 0-1, D Regan 0-1, P Murphy 0-1.		P Bergin 1-4, P Corrigan 0-6, M Corrigan 1-2.

=== Final ===
26 September 1993 Final	St Rynagh's	1-16 - 1-14	Birr	St Brendan's Park
	T Moylan 1-2, M Conneely 0-5, D Devery 0-3, F Dolan 0-2, R Mannion 0-1, M Duignan 0-1, A Fogarty 0-1, M Kenny 0-1.		A Cahill 0-8, P Murphy 1-0, D Pilkington 0-2, M Feenane 0-1, C McGlone 0-1, G Cahill 0-1, O O'Neill 0-1.
