= 1990 Offaly Senior Hurling Championship =

Annual hurling competition season

- Champions: St Rynagh's (14th title); Martin Hanamy (captain); Pad Joe Whelehan (manager)
- Runners-up: Birr; Michael Hogan (captain); Ken Hogan (manager)

The 1990 Offaly Senior Hurling Championship was the 93rd staging of the Offaly Senior Hurling Championship since its establishment by the Offaly County Board in 1896.

Lusmagh entered the championship as the defending champions.

The final was played on 14 October 1990 at St Brendan's Park in Birr, between St Rynagh's and Birr, in what was their fourth meeting in the final overall. St Rynagh's won the match by 2–06 to 1–07 to claim their 14th championship title overall and a first championship title in three years.

== Knockout stage ==
=== Semi-finals ===
7 October 1990 Semi-final	St Rynagh's	1-17 - 2-08	Lusmagh	St Brendan's Park
	M Conneely 1-11, E Mulhare 0-3, S White 0-2, M Duignan 0-1.		Ronald Byrne 1-3, Raymond Byrne 1-1, B Kelly 0-2, F Larkin 0-1, J Troy 0-1.

7 October 1990 Semi-final	Birr	2-10 - 0-07	Kilcormac–Killoughey	St Brendan's Park
	F Pilkington 2-1, G Cahill 0-5, D Pilkington 0-2, O O'Neill 0-1, T Murphy 0-1.		D Owens 0-5, J Rigney 0-1, T Kilmartin 0-1.

=== Final ===
14 October 1990 Final	St Rynagh's	2-06 - 1-07	Birr	St Brendan's Park
	M Conneely 1-4, J Nallen 1-0, D Fogarty 0-1, D Devery 0-1.		P Kirwan 1-0, G Cahill 0-2, J Pilkington 0-1, Brian Whelehan 0-1, O O'Neill 0-1, D Pilkington 0-1, A Cahill 0-1.
