= 1982–83 All-Ireland Senior Club Hurling Championship =

All-Ireland Senior Club Hurling Championship 1982–83
Championship Details
- Dates: 29 August 1982 – 17 April 1983

All Ireland Champions
- Winners: Loughgiel Shamrocks (1st win)
- Captain: Niall Patterson

All Ireland Runners-up
- Runners-up: St Rynagh's
- Captain: Seán White

Provincial Champions
- Munster: Moycarkey-Borris
- Leinster: St. Rynagh's
- Ulster: Loughgiel Shamrocks
- Connacht: Kiltormer

Championship Statistics
- Top Scorer: Pádraig Horan (3–27)

The 1982–83 All-Ireland Senior Club Hurling Championship was the 13th staging of the All-Ireland Senior Club Hurling Championship, the Gaelic Athletic Association's premier inter-county club hurling tournament.

James Stephens of Kilkenny were the defending champions, however, they failed to qualify after being beaten by Ballyhale Shamrocks in the final of the 1982 Kilkenny SHC. Slashers Gaels of Longford and Moycarkey–Borris of Tipperary made their championship debuts.

The All-Ireland final, a replay, was played at Casement Park in Belfast on 24 April 1983, between Loughgiel Shamrocks of Antrim and St Rynagh's of Offaly, in what was a first championship meeting between the teams. Loughgiel Shamrocks won the match by 2–12 to 1–12 to become the first team from Antrim to win the title.

Pádraig Horan was the championship's top scorer with 3–27.

== Results ==
=== Connacht Senior Club Hurling Championship ===
First round

10 October 1982 First round	St. Mary's Kiltoghert	1–06 – 1–09	Craobh Rua	McGettigan Park, Drumshanbo

Second round

7 November 1982 Second round	Craobh Rua	2–02 – 7–20	Tooreen	Oxfield Park, Drumcliff
			A Henry 4–2, J Henry 2–7, P Delaney 1–2, M Trench 0–4, J Cunnane 0–2, T Fanning 0–2, T Henry 0–1.

Semi-final

28 November 1982 Semi-final	Four Roads	6–08 – 2–05	Tooreen	Athleague Sportsfield, Athleague
	F Grehan 3–0, B McDonnell 2–0, Paul Dolan 1–0, T Fallon 0–3, Paddy Dolan 0–3, P Kelly 0–1, PJ Moran 0–1.		J Cunnane 1–3, A Henry 1–0, P Delaney 0–1, J Henry 0–1.	Referee: R Mullen (Sligo)

Final

23 January 1983 Final	Four Roads	0–06 – 3–14	Kiltormer	Athleague Sportsfield, Athleague
	P Dolan 0–5, P Kelly 0–1.		T Furey 1–6, M Staunton 1–1, J Goode 1–1, M Kilkenny 0–2, S Kelly 0–2, P Glynn 0–1.	Referee: F Young (Athlone)

=== Leinster Senior Club Hurling Championship ===
Preliminary round

3 October 1982 Preliminary round	Naomh Moninne	2–06 – 1–13	Slashers Gaels	St. Brigid's Park, Dundalk
			M Lane 0–6, E O'Reilly 1–2, S Stakelum 0–2, P Kennedy 0–1, K Dalton 0–1, P McMahon 0–1.

First round

9 October 1982 First round	Naomh Eoin	1–08 – 1–05	Arklow Rock Parnells	Dr. Cullen Park, Carlow
	E Quirke 0–5, PJ Smithers 1–0, P Quirke 0–2, T Quirke 0–1.		K Mellon 1–0, A Byrne 0–2, J Reilly 0–1, M Byrne 0–1, P Corr 0–1.

9 October 1982 First round	Castletown Geoghegan	8–26 – 2–02	Slasher Gaels	Castletown Geoghegan
	N Geraghty 4–2, E Clarke 2–5, P Dalton 1–7, W Lowry 1–5, D Costello 0–5, G Jackson 0–1, S Hanratty 0–1.		E O'Reilly 1–0, P McMahon 1–0, M Lane 0–2.

10 October 1982 First round	Ardclough	2–10 – 1–04	Kiltale	Sallins Road, Naas
	J Walsh 1–6, A Byrne 1–0, B Burke 0–2, T Christian 0–2.		P Kelly 1–0, R Melia 0–2, M Regan 0–1, P Corley 0–1.

Quarter-finals

23 October 1982 Quarter-final	Portlaoise	2–08 – 1–05	St. Vincent's	St. Fintan's Park, Mountrath
	J Harding 2–1, B Bohane 0–5, P Critchley 0–1, J Keenan 0–1.		N Rooney 1–1, T Quinn 0–1, S Loftus 0–1, T Conroy 0–1, M Loftus 0–1.

23 October 1982 Quarter-final	Castletown Geoghegan	1–12 – 2–10	St. Rynagh's	Castletown Geoghegan
	D Costello 1–2, E Clarke 0–4, P Dalton 0–2, G Jackson 0–2, W Lowry 0–1, S Hanratty 0–1.		P Horan 1–6, H Dolan 1–1, F Kenny 0–2, M Moylan 0–1.

23 October 1983 Quarter-final	Ardclough	1–11 – 4–10	Buffer's Alley	St. Conleth's Park, Newbridge
	J Walsh 0–9, T Johnson 1–0, E King 0–1, T Christian 0–1.		P Lacey 2–2, P Butler 0–5, M Butler 1–1, T Doran 1–0, T Dwyer 0–1, J O'Leary 0–1.

30 October 1982 Quarter-final	Naomh Eoin	1–09 – 3–13	Ballyhale Shamrocks	Dr. Cullen Park, Carlow
	E Quirke 0–4, T Quirke 1–0, N Minchin 0–2, N Smithers 0–1, J O'Hara 0–1, P Quirke 0–1.		M Fennelly 1–2, G Fennelly 1–1, M Kelly 1–0, L Fennelly 0–3, D Fennelly 0–3, S Grace 0–2, B Fennelly 0–2.

Semi-finals

6 November 1982 Semi-final	St. Rynagh's	2–11 – 1–12	Ballyhale Shamrocks	Dr. Cullen Park, Carlow
	P Horan 0–6, D Fogarty 1–2, D Devery 1–0, S White 0–1, J Horan 0–1, F Kenny 0–1.		L Fennelly 1–3, B Fennelly 0–4, S Grace 0–2, S Fennelly 0–1, D Fennelly 0–1, M Kelly 0–1.

7 November 1982 Semi-final	Buffer's Alley	1–14 – 1–09	Portlaoise	Dr. Cullen Park, Carlow
	M Butler 0–5, T Doran 1–1, P Butler 0–3, T Dempsey 0–2, S Whelan 0–1, J McClean 0–1, H Butler 0–1.		B Bohane 1–5, J Keenan 0–1, P Critchley 0–1, L Bergin 0–1, J Harding 0–1.

Final

21 November 1982 Final	St. Rynagh's	1–16 – 2–10	Buffer's Alley	Nowlan Park, Kilkenny
	P Horan 1–8, A Fogarty 0–4, D Devery 0–2, S White 0–1, D Fogarty 0–1.		M Butler 0–5, G Sweeney 1–1, T Dempsey 1–0, T Dwyer 0–2, R Butler 0–1, S O'Leary 0–1.

=== Munster Senior Club Hurling Championship ===
Quarter-finals

10 October 1982 Quarter-finals	Causeway	0–12 – 1–12	Patrickswell	Causeway
	J Regan 0–8, P Moriarty 0–2, DJ Leahy 0–1, P Bunyan 0–1.		R Bennis 1–6, J Enright 0–2, S Foley 0–1, J Fenton 0–1, G Hayes 0–1, F Nolan 0–1.

10 October 1982 Quarter-finals	Éire Óg, Ennis	1–13 – 3–08	Ballyduff Upper	Cusack Park, Ennis
	M Nugent 1–2, T Nugent 0–4, S Lynch 0–2, D Coote 0–2, M Chandler 0–1, P Lynch 0–1, P Barry 0–1.		L Drislane 1–0, J Quirke 1–0, M Walsh 0–3, L Power 0–3, M Walsh 0–1, D Hannon 0–1.

Semi-finals

24 October 1982 Semi-final	Ballyduff Upper	0–14 – 4–09	Moycarkey-Borris	Castle Grounds, Lismore
	Michael Walsh 0–8, Mossy Walsh 0–2, P Prendergast 0–1, L Drislane 0–1, L Power 0–1, R Walsh 0–1.		T Quigley 2–0, John Flanagan 0–6, J Leahy 1–0, D Fogarty 1–0, D Quigley 0–3.	Referee: F Murphy (Cork)

5 December 1982 Semi-final	Patrickswell	2–10 – 2–09 (aet)	St. Finbarr's	FitzGerald Park, Kilmallock
	R Bennis 1–4, B Nolan 1–1, T O'Brien 0–1, G Hayes 0–1, P Foley 0–1, F Nolan 0–1, David Punch 0–1.		T Finn 1–3, J Barry-Murphy 1–1, J Allen 0–2, W Cashman 0–1, J Meyler 0–1, J Cremin 0–1.	Attendance: 3,171

Final

12 December 1982 Final	Moycarkey-Borris	1–09 – 0–11	Patrickswell	MacDonagh Park, Nenagh
	D Fogarty 1–0, T Quigley 0–3, J Caesar 0–2, D Quigley 0–2, John Flanagan 0–1, Jim Flanagan 0–1.		R Bennis 0–5, G Hayes 0–2, F Nolan 0–2, B Nolan 0–1, Jim Fenton 0–1.	Referee: F Murphy (Cork)

=== Ulster Senior Club Hurling Championship ===
Semi-finals

10 October 1982 Semi-final	Clontibret	0–06 – 2–15	Loughgiel Shamrocks	O'Neill Park, Clontibret
	W Connolly 0–4, J Sullivan 0–2.		D McKinley 2–1, A McNaughton 0–6, B Laverty 0–3, B McGeary 0–1, M O'Connell 0–1, S Richmond 0–1, S McNaughton 0–1, P McCarey 0–1.

10 October 1982 Semi-final	Ballygalget	w/o – scr.	Dungannon

Final

24 October 1982 Final	Ballygalget	0–09 – 1–09	Loughgiel Shamrocks	Mitchel Park, Ballygalget
	B Coulter 0–5, M Bailie 0–2, P McKenna 0–1, P Braniff 0–1.		A McNaughton 0–6, A McGarry 1–0, B Laverty 0–1, D McKinley 0–1, P Carey 0–1.

== All-Ireland Senior Club Hurling Championship ==
=== All-Ireland quarter-final ===
6 February 1983 Quarter-final	Moycarkey-Borris	3–05 – 0–05	Brian Borus	Semple Stadium
	D Quigley 1–1, J Flanagan 0–4, J Caesar 1–0, J Leahy 1–0.		M Lyons 0–3, T Connolly 0–1, J Lynch 0–1.	Referee: N Dalton (Waterford)

=== All-Ireland semi-finals ===
13 February 1983 Semi-final	Loughgiel Shamrocks GAA	2–07 – 1–06	Moycarkey-Borris	St Patrick's Park
	A McCarry 1–1, P casey 1–0, M O'Connell 0–2, B Laverty 0–2, M Coyle 0–1, A McNaughton 0–1.		J Flanagan 1–3, D Quigley 0–2, J Caesar 0–1.

13 February 1983 Semi-final	Kiltormer	0–08 – 2–08	St. Rynagh's	Dunlo GAA Grounds
	T Furey 0–2, M Kilkenny 0–2, M Staunton 0–1, S Kelly 0–1, J Goode 0–1, O Kilkenny 0–1.		F Kenny 2–1, P Horan 0–3, D Devery 0–1, T Conneely 0–1, S White 0–1, A Fogarty 0–1.

=== All-Ireland final ===
17 April 1983 Final	St Rynagh's	2–05 – 1–08	Loughgiel Shamrocks	Croke Park
	H Dolan 1–1, A Horan 1–0, P Horan 0–2, D Devery 0–1, A Fogarty 0–1.		B Laverty 1–0, A McNaughton 0–3, M O'Connell 0–2, M Coyle 0–1, P Carey jnr. 0–1, A McCarry 0–1.	Referee: N O'Donoghue (Dublin)

=== All-Ireland final replay ===
24 April 1983 Final replay	Loughgiel Shamrocks	2–12 – 1–12	St Rynagh's	Casement Park
	A McCarry 1–3, B Laverty 1–1, S McNaughton 0–3, P Carey jnr. 0–2, A McNaughton 0–1, M O'Connell 0–1, P Carey snr. 0–1.		P Horan 1–2, A Fogarty 0–3, D Devery 0–3, H Dolan 0–2, A Horan 0–1, F Kenny 0–1.	Referee: J Rankins (Laois)

== Statistics ==
=== Top scorers ===
Rank	Player	Club	Tally	Total	Matches	Average
1	Pádraig Horan	St. Rynagh's	3–27	36	6	6.00
2	Richie Bennis	Patrickswell	2–15	21	3	7.00
3	Johnny Walsh	Ardclough	1–15	18	2	9.00
4	Austin Henry	Tooreen	5–02	17	2	8.50
4	John Flanagan	Moycarkey-Borris	1–14	17	4	4.25
6	Éamonn Clarke	Castletown Geoghegan	2–09	15	2	7.50
7	Noel Geraghty	Castletown Geoghegan	4–02	14	2	7.00
7	Aidan McCarry	Loughgiel Shamrocks	3–05	14	4	3.50
7	Joe Henry	Tooreen	2–08	14	2	7.00
7	Mick Butler	Buffers Alley	1–11	14	3	4.66

=== Miscellaneous ===
- Following St. Rynagh's' defeat of Kiltormer in the All-Ireland semi-final, it was revealed that a St. Rynagh's player, Declan Fogarty, remained on the field for seven minutes after being sent off. The match was then awarded to Kiltormer, however, St. Rynagh's countered that Kiltormer had fielded an unregistered player. Kiltormer subsequently withdrew their complaint.
