= 1992 Offaly Senior Hurling Championship =

Annual hurling competition season

- Champions: St Rynagh's (15th title); Aidan Fogarty (captain)
- Runners-up: Lusmagh; Jim Troy (captain)

The 1992 Offaly Senior Hurling Championship was the 95th staging of the Offaly Senior Hurling Championship since its establishment by the Offaly County Board in 1896.

Birr entered the championship as the defending champions.

The final was played on 1 November 1992 at St Brendan's Park in Birr, between St Rynagh's and Lusmagh, in what was their second meeting in the final overall. St Rynagh's won the match by 0–10 to 0–09 to claim their 15th championship title overall and a first championship title in two years.

== Results ==
=== Semi-finals ===
18 October 1992 Semi-final	Lusmagh	2-13 - 2-09	Birr	St Brendan's Park
	John Troy 1-6, J Kelly 0-3, B Hennessy 1-0 (og), P Temple 0-2, T Kelly 0-1, B Kelly 0-1.		G Cahill 1-1, O O'Neill 0-4, P Murphy 1-0, Brian Whelehan 0-2, P Kirwan 0-1, D Pilkington 0-1.

24 October 1992 Semi-final	St Rynagh's	2-14 - 1-12	Seir Kieran	St Brendan's Park
	A Fogarty 1-1, F Dolan 1-1, M Conneely 0-4, M Kenny 0-4, M Duignan 0-2, E Mulhare 0-1, T Moylan 0-1.		B Dooley 1-2, Johnny Dooley 0-4, S Dooley 0-3, Joe Dooley 0-2, J Coakley 0-1.

=== Final ===
1 November 1992 Final	St Rynagh's	0-10 - 0-09	Lusmagh	St Brendan's Park
	M Conneely 0-7, R Mannion 0-1, M Kenny 0-1, F Dolan 0-1.		John Troy 0-4, J Kelly 0-2, K Dalton 0-1, B Bermingham 0-1, T Kelly 0-1.
