= Banagher =

Town in County Offaly, Leinster, Ireland

Banagher Beannchar na Sionna
- Town
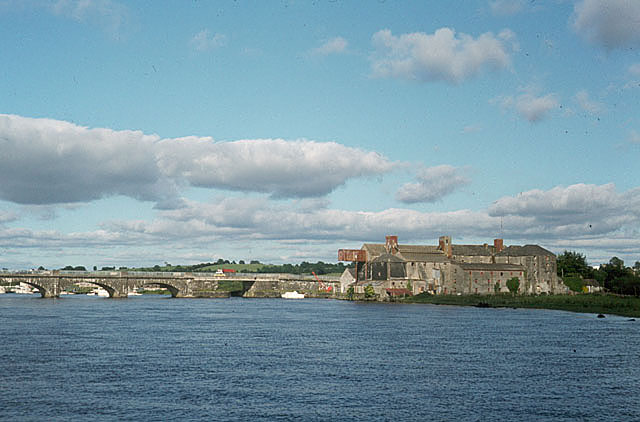
- Banagher Bridge and Maltings

- Location in Ireland
- Coordinates: 53°11′00″N 7°59′00″W
- Country: Ireland
- Province: Leinster
- County: Offaly

Area
  - Total: 1.80 km^{2} (0.69 sq mi)
- Elevation: 47 m (154 ft)

Population (2022)
  - Total: 1,907
  - Density: 1,060/km^{2} (2,740/sq mi)
- Time zone: UTC+0 (WET)
  - Summer (DST): UTC-1 (IST (WEST))

Historical population
Year	Pop.	±%
1821	2,813	—
1831	2,636	−6.3%
1841	2,827	+7.2%
1851	1,846	−34.7%
1861	1,426	−22.8%
1871	1,206	−15.4%
1881	1,192	−1.2%
1891	1,164	−2.3%
1901	1,114	−4.3%
1911	891	−20.0%
1926	788	−11.6%
1936	720	−8.6%
1946	636	−11.7%
1951	840	+32.1%
1956	1,027	+22.3%
1961	1,050	+2.2%
1966	1,154	+9.9%
1971	1,052	−8.8%
1981	1,378	+31.0%
1986	1,465	+6.3%
1991	1,423	−2.9%
1996	1,414	−0.6%
2002	1,553	+9.8%
2006	1,636	+5.3%
2011	1,653	+1.0%
2016	1,760	+6.5%
2022	1,907	+8.4%

Banagher (Irish: Beannchar or Beannchar na Sionna) is a town in Ireland, located in the midlands, on the western edge of County Offaly in the province of Leinster, on the banks of the River Shannon. The town had a population of 3,000 at the height of its economic growth in the mid-19th century. According to the 2022 census, its population was 1,907.

Banagher was historically an important strategic location on the River Shannon and was one of the few crossing points between the provinces of Leinster and Connacht. It thus became a natural focus for a number of historical buildings, including a 19th-century Martello Tower and a number of castles around the town, which were built in the 14th and 15th centuries. The town used to be the focus of thriving river business and was an important stop on the Dublin to Limerick navigation. It supported a number of industries, including a maltings and distillery, which are now defunct. Tourism has supplanted this to a certain extent with a modern marina providing support for river cruisers and watersports facilities and the town is an angling centre, with particular attraction for pike anglers. Banagher is the centre of the Shannon Callows, grassy meadows which flood in winter and provide living space for waterfowl.

== Etymology ==
There are more than twenty places in Ireland called Banagher or a version thereof. Banagher can be derived as the anglicised version of the Irish 'Beannchor' or 'Beannchar'. Most Irish placenames relate to topographical features and this is the case with 'Beannchor' - in this sense 'beann' refers to or means a 'peak' or 'top' and is widely used in the names of hills and mountains while 'cor' also appears in numerous placenames and refers to or means a rounded or curved hill, such as Cor Hill, Cormore, Corbeg Corbane and many others. A related interpretation uses the Irish form in its two-word version, understood in English as "the place of the pointed rocks on the Shannon".

== History ==
The settlement originated at a ford due to an esker which crosses the Shannon at that location and as a consequence a narrow neck of land was flood-free all year round. Travellers intending to cross the Shannon converged on this point along tracks which were the forerunners of the modern roads, and a community grew at this crossing point.

=== St. Rynagh ===
It is thought that St. Rynagh (also Reynagh, Rinagh), after whom the local parish of Gallen and Reynagh is named, was a sister of St. Finnian of Clonard. According to research, they came from a place near New Ross in County Wexford. It is known that contact was maintained between Rynagh's Wexford home and her foundation at Banagher, and her mother came to live there. It is recorded that Reynagh's mother, Talech, or Talacia, became Abbess of the Banagher convent. The death of St. Finnian is assigned to 563, but there does not seem to be an authoritative statement as to the date of St. Rynagh's death, although according to St. Rynagh's Parish Church in Banagher, St. Rynagh died about 610. The place of her burial is uncertain but it is likely to have been in either Banagher or Kilmacduagh near Gort, the monastery founded by her son, St. Colman.

=== Annals and pilgrims ===
At Banagher, there are esker ridges on both sides of the river and roads were built along these many centuries ago. The first bridge was built over the Shannon at that point as early as 1049. It was a place of great strategic importance because the Shannon and its lowlands provided a natural barrier between Connacht and Leinster. An army that wanted to cross the river in the area of the Shannon Callows had few choices; apart from Banagher, the only other suitable places were Athlone, Shannonbridge and Portumna.

Áth Cróich was the earlier recorded Irish name for the town - this name first appears in the Irish annals in 1120, when one of three principal bridges in Ireland was built there by King Turlough O’Connor. Historical sources, including the writings of Sir Mathew De Renzy, indicate that Áth Cróich and Banagher refer to the same location; the Locus Gaelic Placenames project confirmed that Banagher and Áth Cróich are synonymous and will be recorded as such in future editions of the definitive dictionary of Gaelic placenames.

Many of the early travellers were pilgrims. North-west of Banagher, on the Connacht side of the river, was the monastic establishment of Clonfert, with the more famous Clonmacnoise a short distance further north. Not far to the south-west on the same side was another monastic foundation, at Meelick. At Meelick, the three provinces, Leinster, Munster and Connacht meet and just south of Banagher in the direction of Birr, the four dioceses of Clonmacnoise, Meath, Killaloe and Clonfert meet.

=== Military history and charter ===
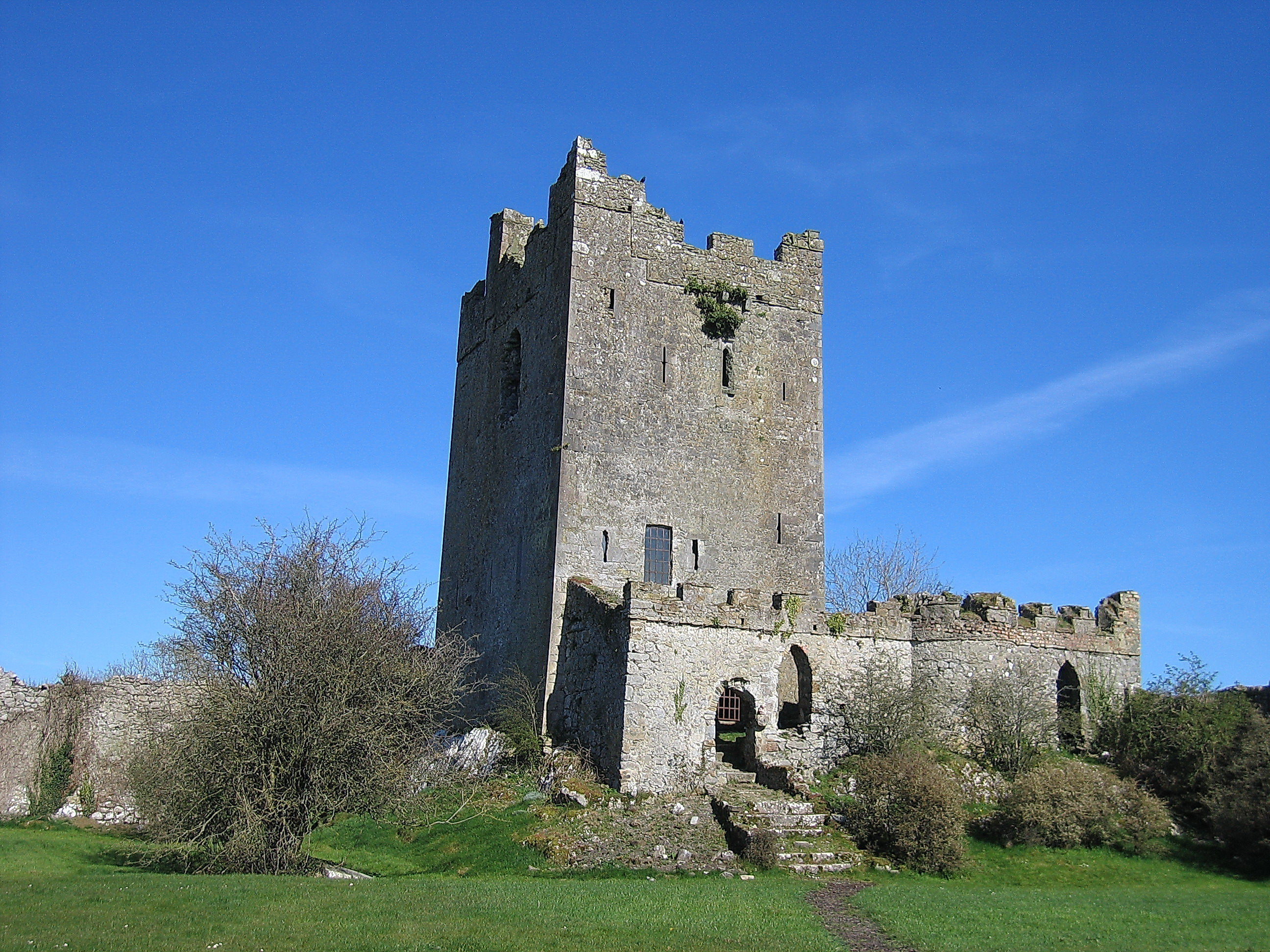
Clonony Castle

The importance of Banagher as a military position on the Shannon and the highway from Leinster and Munster to Connacht was early appreciated by the English, whose forces seized it about the middle of the 16th century, coming up the river to do so. They constructed some fortifications which they called Fort Frankford (later Fort Falkland) and held the place in spite of the fact that the part of Offaly for some miles around Banagher was in the hands of the MacCoghlan clan. The MacCoghlans, aided by boundaries of bog and river, held their territories against all comers for about 500 years, even maintaining a footing by open defiance well into the 17th century. Garry Castle, Clonony Castle, and Moystown Castle are remains of MacCoghlan strongholds. Sometime after 1554, when Queen Mary married Philip II of Spain, Offaly County was named King's County in honour of Philip, but it is doubtful if the royal jurisdiction extended to any of the MacCoghlan areas except Banagher. Ultimately, the MacCoghlans were overthrown and their lands were planted by order of James I issued in 1621.

The town was incorporated by charter of Charles I on 16 September 1628. The corporation was allowed to elect two members to Parliament and hold two fairs per year, amongst other wide-ranging powers.

In 1628, a permanent military garrison was established which continued with slight interruptions until 1863. The defences were further strengthened and it was officially named Fort Falkland, after Henry Cary, 1st Viscount Falkland who was Lord Deputy of Ireland from 1622 to 1629. The forces of the Confederate Catholics took Banagher in 1642, but it was retaken by the Cromwellian Army in 1650, under the command of Henry Ireton, Cromwell's son-in-law. By 1652 the Cromwellian conquest was completed and the transplantation of the Catholic landholders to Connacht began in 1654. Cromwell's castle, built in 1653, and still standing, helped control access and egress on the mid Shannon. The lands from which they were expelled were divided among the adventurers and the soldiers of Cromwell's army.

During the Williamite Wars of 1690–1691, the garrison espoused the cause of James II in contrast with that of Birr, which took the side of William. A stone bridge across the Shannon was erected in 1685, and a Williamite army advancing from Birr in 1690 attempted to break it down but abandoned the attempt as too risky in consequence of the presence of Sarsfield's Army on the Connacht side. A broken arch of this bridge is still to be seen on that side a few yards below the present bridge of seven arches, which was erected by the Commissioners for the Improvement of Navigation of the Shannon in 1841–1843. The square tower on the lower side of the bridge at the Galway end was erected to protect the old bridge, as was the Salt Battery, with emplacements for four cannons facing west and north, a few hundred yards from town along the Crank Road.

The Irish garrison remained in Banagher without further molestation until the Battle of Aughrim, after which Banagher was evacuated. The English re-occupied the town, where they remained until the middle of the 19th century when Banagher ceased to be a garrison town.

=== Economic growth ===
In the 17th century, Banagher was the centre of a flourishing wool trade. In 1699, the impost placed on the export of woollen goods to England practically killed the wool trade. At the outbreak of the American Revolutionary War in 1775, an embargo placed on the export of foodstuffs to the American Colonies dealt another blow to the trade of Banagher. In 1780, the British Parliament withdrew all these restrictions and Banagher's economy began to improve rapidly.

From 1800 to 1847, Banagher enjoyed a period of prosperity unequalled in its history. Corn growing had long been one of the chief agricultural activities of the district and the opening of the Grand Canal at the end of the 18th century (and its reaching Shannon Harbour in 1804) brought cheap and efficient water transport to the district, and gave easy access to the cities of Dublin and Limerick. Banagher became the outlet for the grain raised in a wide area around the town, and the Banagher corn market on Fridays was one of the largest of such fairs in Ireland.

With the water transport facilities stimulating the growth of existing industries and encouraging the establishment of new ones, neat two and three-storey houses were built on each side of the road in Banagher to provide shops and dwellings for the merchants and other people who came to live there for the canal business. In 1834, there were many businesses, including a distillery, a brewery, two tanyards, a malthouse and corn mills in full operation in the town. Several craftsmen carried on industries in smaller workshops and their homes. With the increase in trade and manufactures went a corresponding increase in population. In 1800, the population was estimated at 1500; in 1841, it was 2836, and in 1846, it was estimated at 3000.

=== Decline ===
In sharp contrast with the flourishing state of trade in the first half of the 19th century was the rapid and sustained decline during the second half. In the period of 40 years from 1841 to 1881, the town's population fell from 2836 to 1192, a loss of over 57%. By the end of the century, all that remained of the major industries of the town was the malthouse of F.A. Waller & Co., while all smaller industries had vanished completely. Various causes contributed to this decline. The abolition of the Corn Laws in 1846 allowed the free importation of grain into Britain and Ireland. Unable to compete with foreigners, the Irish farmer turned land over to pasture and grew only sufficient grain for family use. The Banagher corn trade rapidly declined, and would have completely vanished were it not that barley growing was kept alive by Waller's malthouse. The clearances in East Galway in the years immediately succeeding the Great Irish Famine adversely affected the trade of the town while the smaller industries were unable to compete against the highly organised industries of Britain.

The opening of Banagher Railway station in 1884, as the terminus of the 29 km (18 mi) Clara to Banagher branch of the Great Southern & Western Railway Company, brought some improvement, with several passenger and goods trains every day.

In March 1920, Resident Magistrate Alan Bell, from Banagher, was killed. He was pulled from a tram in south Dublin and shot at point blank range by Collins' IRA "Squad". His death was instantaneous. He was tasked by the British to track down Sinn Féin funds; he had successfully confiscated over £71,000 from Sinn Féin's HQ and, by investigating banks throughout the country, was set to seize much more.

The fuel crisis of 1947 caused passenger services to be withdrawn from the line and it closed altogether in 1963. Although the site of the station is now covered by the marina, the trackway can still be seen, minus the track, at the gateway at the eastern corner of the marina.

== Geography ==
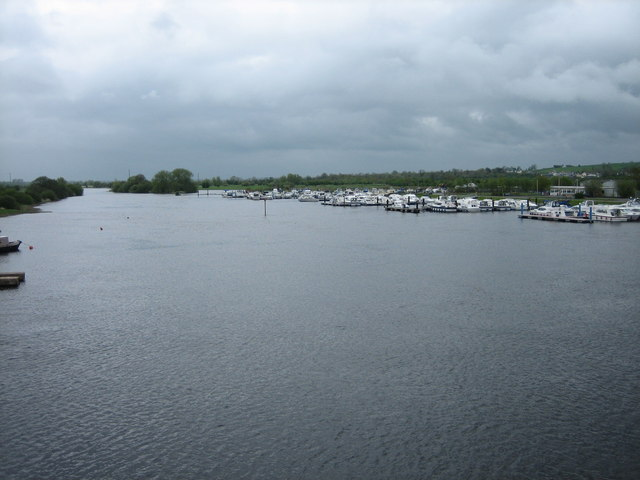
River Shannon from Banagher Bridge

Banagher is situated in north-west County Offaly on the east bank of the River Shannon. It is 106 km (66 mi) south-west of Dublin, 14 km (8.7 mi) south-east of Ballinasloe, 27 km (17 mi) south of Athlone and 85 km (53 mi) north east of Limerick. It provides a crossing point between Offaly in Leinster and Galway in Connacht. Although Banagher is located in the flood-plain of the River Shannon, the town itself was developed on high ground and remains virtually flood-free all year round. North of Lough Derg, the River Shannon has a very shallow gradient and regularly floods parts of the surrounding countryside. The resultant wet grassland area, known as the Shannon Callows, is an internationally recognised wild bird and wildlife habitat and is classified as a Special Area of Conservation.

The country on either side of the Shannon in the Offaly-Galway area has been described as "reminiscent of the Fens, cut off and intersected by waterways, by the wide meandering Shannon itself, by its tributaries, the Suck, the Brosna and the Little Brosna and by the Grand Canal; traversed by a maze of narrow roads."

The travel writer and biographer, James Pope-Hennessy, described the River Shannon at Banagher in September in his biography of Anthony Trollope: "The month of September in Banagher, and all along the Shannon banks, is visually a glorious one, with golden autumn mornings, the low sun making long shadows of the houses in the street. At dusk the whole river reflects the varied sunsets as the days draw in – effects of palest pink, for instance, striped by cloudy lines of green, or an horizon aflame with scarlet and orange light."

The Slieve Bloom Mountains lie to the south of Banagher and the town is surrounded by the great bogs of the midlands, particularly to the east and west. The River Brosna is a major tributary of the River Shannon and meets the Shannon at Shannon Harbour, three kilometres north of Banagher.

=== Climate ===
Banagher has a temperate climate. Average daily high temperatures are 18 °C (64 °F) in July and 8 °C (46 °F) in January. Precipitation, at an average of 804 mm per annum, is similar to that in much of the midlands and east of Ireland, and is significantly less than the precipitation on the west coast, which averages between 1000 mm and 1250 mm per annum.

Climate data for Banagher, Ireland.
Month	Jan	Feb	Mar	Apr	May	Jun	Jul	Aug	Sep	Oct	Nov	Dec	Year
Record high °C (°F)	14 (57)	15 (59)	20 (68)	24 (75)	26 (79)	31 (88)	31 (88)	30 (86)	25 (77)	22 (72)	18 (64)	15 (59)	31 (88)
Mean daily maximum °C (°F)	8 (46)	8 (46)	10 (50)	12 (54)	15 (59)	18 (64)	18 (64)	19 (66)	17 (63)	14 (57)	10 (50)	8 (46)	13 (55)
Mean daily minimum °C (°F)	2 (36)	2 (36)	3 (37)	4 (39)	6 (43)	9 (48)	11 (52)	10 (50)	9 (48)	7 (45)	3 (37)	3 (37)	6 (43)
Record low °C (°F)	−15 (5)	−15 (5)	−11 (12)	−5 (23)	−2 (28)	0 (32)	3 (37)	1 (34)	−1 (30)	−3 (27)	−7 (19)	−9 (16)	−15 (5)
Average precipitation mm (inches)	76 (3.0)	54 (2.1)	61 (2.4)	53 (2.1)	68 (2.7)	55 (2.2)	59 (2.3)	78 (3.1)	71 (2.8)	84 (3.3)	74 (2.9)	79 (3.1)	804 (31.7)

=== Wildlife ===
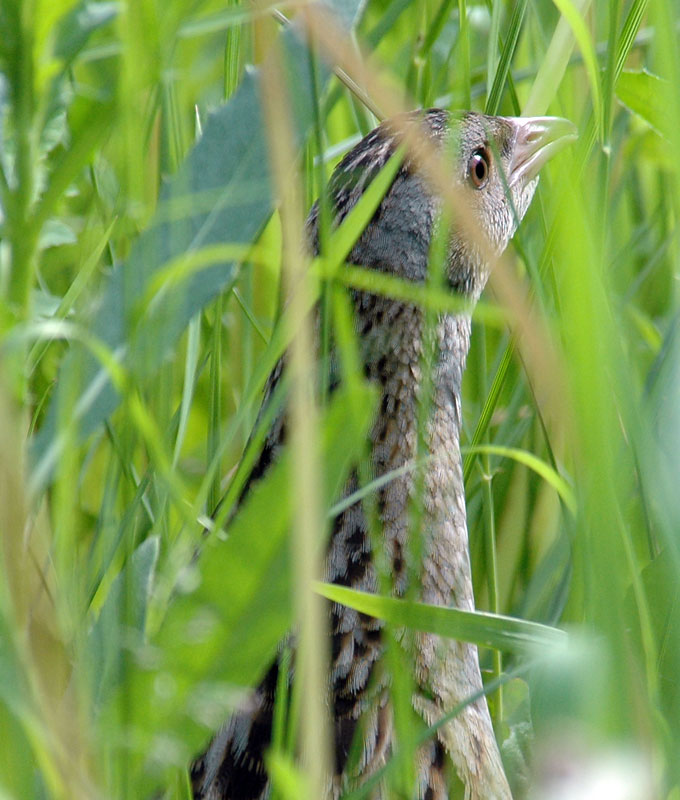
Corncrake

In autumn and winter, the extensive flood plain of the Shannon Callows supports a large number of waders, swans, wildfowl and other bird life. The most obvious of all Shannon birds is the mute swan. Also seen are the Eurasian coot, common moorhen and little grebe. The kingfisher is widespread as are the meadow pipit and pied wagtail. The area has one of the largest concentrations of breeding waders in Ireland including lapwing, redshank, common sandpiper and black-tailed godwit.

The corncrake can be seen at the bridge of Banagher in the summer. Once a common summer visitor to Ireland, corncrakes have suffered drastic population declines over the last few decades and are threatened with global extinction. Conservation efforts have focused on changing harvesting times to avoid the nesting season, May to August. The hay meadows of the callows support large numbers of these birds – one of the few places in the world where this globally threatened species is still common.

In winter, the resident bird population is increased by visitors from north-east Europe, in particular the Eurasian wigeon and the Greenland subspecies of the white-fronted goose. Riverside mammals are seen frequently and Eurasian otter, American mink and red fox are common. Trout and salmon are less common in the Shannon than they once were, but pike is still plentiful and attracts anglers.

=== Demographics ===
Banagher was extensively planted by the English, particularly during the periods 1621–1642 and 1650–1690. The plantations had a profound impact on Ireland in several ways. The first was the destruction of the native ruling classes and their replacement with the Protestant Ascendancy, of British-origin (mostly English) Protestant landowners. Their position was buttressed by the Penal Laws, which denied political and land-owning rights to Roman Catholics. The dominance of this class in Irish life persisted until the late 18th century, and it voted for the Act of Union with Britain in 1800. As a result, by the early 20th century, Banagher had a mix of Irish of native descent and Irish of English descent and supported two churches, one Catholic and one Protestant, both of which still exist.

During the late 1960s to the early 1980s, several German, Dutch and Swiss settlers were attracted to Banagher, mainly because of its proximity to the River Shannon and associated lifestyle. A number of these are still resident in Banagher. In the early 21st century a number of people from Eastern Europe (for example Poland) moved to the area, and these now make up approximately 4% of the population.

In 2011, Banagher had a population of 1,653 (a 1.0% increase on the 2006 Census) with 801 male and 852 female residents. By 2022, the population had increased further to 1,907 inhabitants.

== Economy ==
The demise of the once-thriving canal and maltings businesses brought about a serious decline in Banagher's fortunes, including a significant population decrease. However, a number of businesses kept many people in the locality employed during lean times. The most notable of these was Bord na Móna, a semi-state company founded in 1946 to manage the harvesting of peat from Ireland's bogs, the most extensive of which are located in the midlands. However, the advancement of mechanised harvesting, the exhaustion of the bogs and the closure of a number of peat-fired power stations, means that this is no longer a significant employer in the region. Green Isle Foods had a facility just outside Banagher and provided good employment during the 1970s and 1980s. It was taken out of production some years ago and is now used as a storage facility only. The largest industry in Banagher these days is Banagher Precast Concrete Limited, a company specialising in precast concrete structures. The company employs approximately 150 people and was one of the largest concrete firms in the country, employing over 400 people at its peak in 2008. It has supplied components for many major projects, including the Aviva Stadium, Croke Park, Channel Tunnel, the Dublin Port Tunnel, Thomond Park and the Limerick Tunnel, and most recently Páirc Uí Chaoimh in Cork. Other notable employers include Banagher Sawmills and the cruise liner businesses located at the marina, such as Silver Line Cruisers.

== Transportation ==
Banagher is an important crossing point on the River Shannon and consequently experiences a large volume of through traffic. Two regional roads meet in Banagher; the R356, which links the N62 and N65 national primary roads and is known as Harbour Street in Banagher and the R439 which links Birr with Banagher and is known as Main Street in Banagher. Harbour Street leads to the road to Shannon Harbour and Main Street begins at the hill at the southern entrance to the town and leads down to the bridge crossing the Shannon.

A railway station opened in Banagher in 1884 as the terminus for the Clara to Banagher line of the Great Southern & Western Railway Company. It operated both a passenger and goods service until 1947 when the passenger service was withdrawn. The station closed completely in 1963.

Banagher was once a centre for river transportation on the Shannon system. River transportation fell into decline with the advent of rail and road transportation improvements. Banagher is still a centre for river cruisers, with a number of hire companies operating the town's marina.

== Governance and administrative units ==
Banagher lies in the local council area of Offaly County Council. Local authorities have responsibility for such matters as planning, local roads, sanitation, and libraries. The Council is an elected body of 21 members with councillors elected from four electoral areas in the county. Banagher lies in the Birr electoral area, which returns five members to the council.

The town lies in the Barony of Garrycastle (Garraí an Chaisleáin) and was in the poor law union of Birr. Divided by the road to Birr from Eyrecourt, its eastern part lies in the townland of Curraghavarna and Portavrolla and its western part in the townland of Banagher or Kylebeg.

== Culture ==
=== Banagher Fair ===
As part of the charter of incorporation of 1628, the corporation was given powers to: "hold two fairs, one on the Feast of St. Philip and Jacob, the other on the Feast of St. Simon and Jude, each to continue for two days." These feast days equated to 1 May and 28 October. However, a fair was already in existence in Banagher since 1612 and was held in September. These three fairs were certainly still in existence in the mid-1830s, as they were described in a government-commissioned report in 1835.

The fairs established by the first corporation continued to gain in size and importance during the 18th century and the early part of the 19th century. In 1826, the enormous number of 43,000 sheep was offered for sale at the September fair, with three-quarters of that number being sold. Pigot's Directory of 1824 described the workings of the fair: "...and there are three fairs; the principal one commences on the 15 September and continues for four days, the first for sheep, the second for horned cattle, the third for horses, and the last day is the country fair for linen, woollens and other merchandise."

It seems that the fair held in September was the main fair and is the one that has survived to the present. Pope-Hennessy described the granting of the charter by Charles I which "empowered them to hold the famous Banagher Great Fair, at which everything from cattle and sheep to boots and basket chairs was on sale. This Fair, the greatest in all the Irish Midlands, began on September 15 and lasted four days. The line of horses tethered on each side of Banagher Main Street stretched from the Shannon river bridge to the crossroads two and a half miles outside the town known as Tailor's Cross."

The fair had achieved an international reputation by the early 20th century and a local newspaper report of 1909 states "The Banagher Great Fair was a huge success and among those present were Senor Gelline of Milan to make purchase on behalf of the Italian Government, while Mr Rodzanko bought for the Russian Government." The report also stated that "Eighty-nine wagons of horses were entrained at Banagher Railway Station...this representing in round numbers about 500 horses."

=== Architecture, buildings and structures ===
==== Banagher Bridge ====
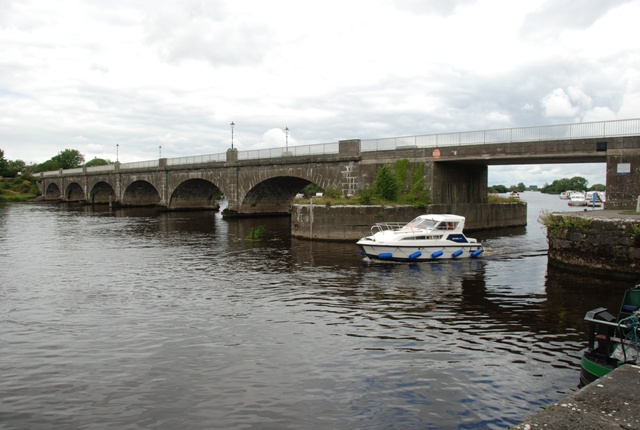
Banagher Bridge

The first bridge that is known to have been built at this point was erected as a "spacious stone bridge of 18 arches" by Ruaidrí Ua Conchobair (Anglicised Roderic O'Connor), the King of Connacht, around 1049. However, medieval sources tell of a "bridge of 27 arches of divers(e) architectural form, each different from its fellow", which stood here for over 500 years. A stone bridge of 17 arches was certainly constructed in 1685 and this was detailed in profile drawings by Thomas Rhodes in 1833.

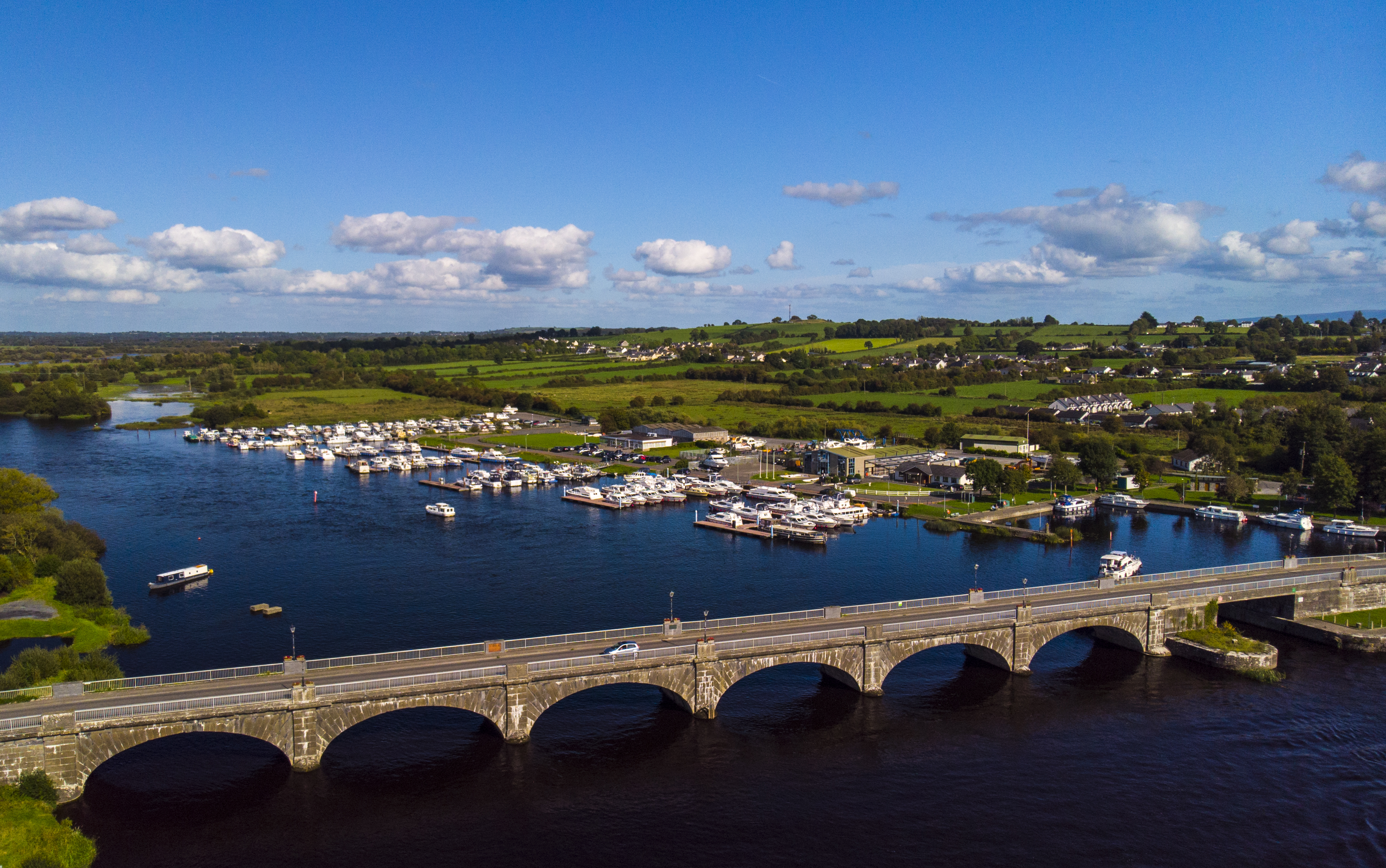
Banagher Bridge

The bridge of 1685 featured prominently in the Williamite War in Ireland of the 17th century and was used by Patrick Sarsfield to retreat to Connacht after his ambush of a Williamite convoy at Ballyneety in County Limerick during the siege of Limerick. Because of its affording Sarsfield and his army a method of advance and retreat, the old bridge was often referred to as Sarsfield's Bridge. This bridge was blown up in 1843 by gunpowder by a section of the Corps of Royal Engineers. The abutment of this bridge can still be seen adjacent to Cromwell's Castle on the Connacht side of the river.

Banagher Bridge in the 19th century

The present bridge of seven arches was erected by the Commissioners for the Improvement of Navigation of the Shannon in 1841–1843. The engineer was Thomas Rhodes, one of the commissioners of the Shannon Navigation, whose name can be seen on many of the bridges over the Shannon and on surviving lock mechanisms, notably at Victoria and Athlone locks. This bridge was reconstructed and widened jointly by Offaly County Council and Galway County Council in 1971. Their work included replacing massive stone parapets on either side of the bridge with aluminium railings, and the removal of a swivel arch which had allowed passage for masted boats.

A heritage review of the bridges of County Offaly in 2005 described Banagher Bridge as of national heritage significance, of high architectural merit and demonstrative of mid-19th century construction work by a government body. It states "This is the only six-arch masonry span in the county. It is an interesting contrast with the 1750s bridge at Shannonbridge. Although both are approximately the same length, Banagher Bridge achieves the crossing with fewer spans (six as opposed to 16). It also has the longest masonry arch spans of all the county's bridges, averaging 17.88 m".

All of the castellations around and near the bridge were built to protect it, including Cromwell's Castle, The Salt Battery (Fort Eliza), Fort Falkland and the Martello Tower. However, the guns mounted on these forts could be used to destroy the bridge if necessary, as well as to bombard attacking forces on the river.

A narrow quay passes under the old swivel section of the bridge from Waller's Quay to the marina. A well-worn handrail offers the pedestrian some protection against a slip into the river. This rail has been known as the Duke's Rail since in 1897 the then Duke of York, later to become George V, paid a state visit to Ireland. The royal party travelled up-river from Portumna on the steamship Countess of Mayo. Disembarking at Waller's Quay, the Duke was received by Lord Rosse, the Lord Lieutenant of King's County. The party had to traverse the narrow quay under the bridge to get to Banagher Railway Station, and undoubtedly made good use of the Duke's Rail. The stretch of the Shannon from Portumna to Banagher was known for some time after as the Duke of York's Route.

==== Barracks ====
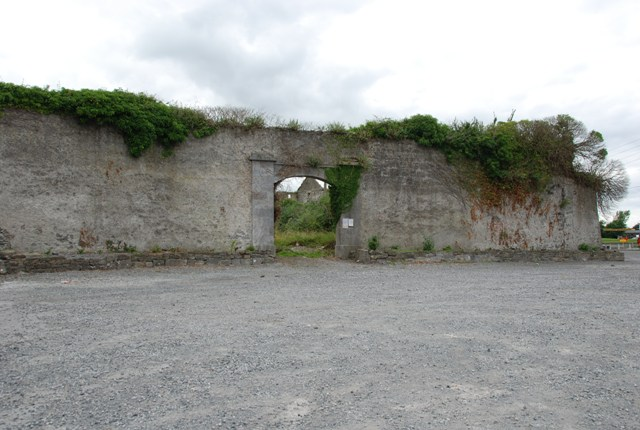
Old Barracks Wall (Fort Falkland)

This former constabulary barracks was built around 1800. Irregular in plan and now in ruins, it comprises a partially roughcast rendered rubble limestone enclosing wall with a cut stone segmental-headed entrance to the east and is situated to the south of the River Shannon, adjacent to the bridge. Remains of structures within the enclosure include a barrel-vaulted powder magazine built around 1806, with a gun platform above. These walls are thought to be the perimeter walls of Fort Falkland from 1642. According to Pigot's Directory of 1824, the barracks housed two companies of foot, had apartments for three officers, a bomb and waterproof magazine and an artillery battery mounting three 12-pound guns. The Directory also states that the barracks was formerly a nunnery (possibly that of Saint Rynagh, which would have been founded around 580) and communicated with Saint Rynagh's Old Abbey by a subterranean passage of some 400 yards. After the British garrison left the town in 1863, the barracks was used by the Royal Irish Constabulary (RIC) and was looted and burned shortly after the signing of the Anglo-Irish Treaty of 1921. The building was largely intact until the 1990s when the majority of the internal structures were illegally demolished.

==== Bow-fronted Georgian houses ====
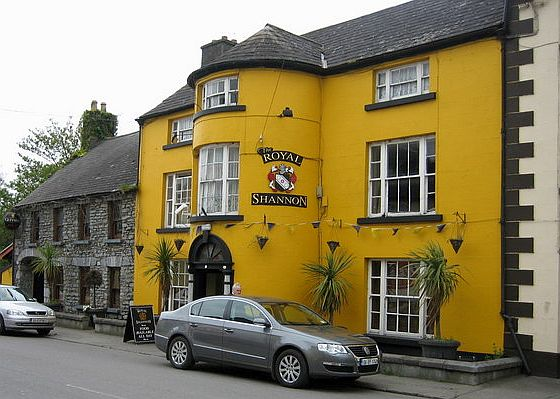
The Shannon Hotel

Banagher has two bow-fronted Georgian buildings dating from the mid-to-late 18th century and both are listed as protected structures. One is a detached seven-bay, two-storey building, called Crank House, due to its location on the corner of Main Street and Crank Road. It was restored in the early 1990s by the Offaly West Enterprise Co-operative Society and opened in 1992. It was formerly used as the headquarters for Crann, an NGO dedicated to planting native trees and protecting Ireland's woodlands. It is now used by the West Offaly Partnership as a Community Enterprise Centre which includes an exhibition hall, tourist office, retail and enterprise units and a hostel. The building is also the location of the Midlands branch office of Birdwatch Ireland.

The second of these buildings is a terraced, three-bay, three-storey house with an adjoining four-bay, two-storey coach house, which still has its original limestone carriage arch. It has been used as a hotel since the early 19th century and was home to Anthony Trollope during his stay in Banagher in the 1840s. It has a prominent location next to the marina and close to the bridge. Long called the 'Shannon Hotel', the name was changed to 'The Royal Shannon' in the 1990s. It has ceased to trade as a hotel and is now falling into neglect.

==== Charlotte's Way ====
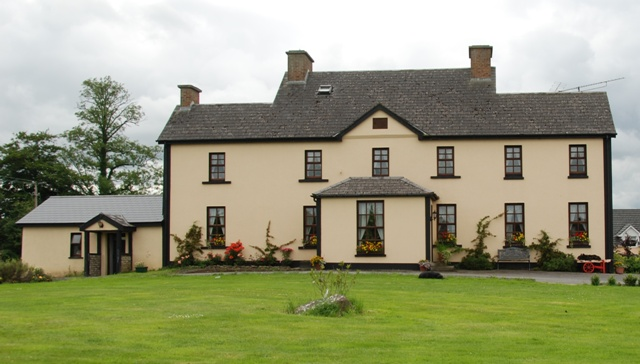
Charlotte's Way (Hill House)

Charlotte's Way, formerly known as Hill House, is located close to Saint Paul's Church of Ireland church. This house was once the home of Charlotte Brontë's husband, Mr Nicholls, who returned to Banagher after Charlotte's death. Nicholls remarried and lived at Hill House until his death in 1906. The house was sold to a Major Bell in 1919. He died in 1944 and his wife inherited the property. Florence Bell died in 1959. This connection to Charlotte Brontë and the Brontë family is revealed in its present name. It is a detached three-bay two-storey house, built in 1753, with a gabled central bay to the façade with modern porch and single-bay two-storey wing to the south and two-bay two-storey wing to the north. It is now used as a bed and breakfast.

==== Cromwell's Castle ====
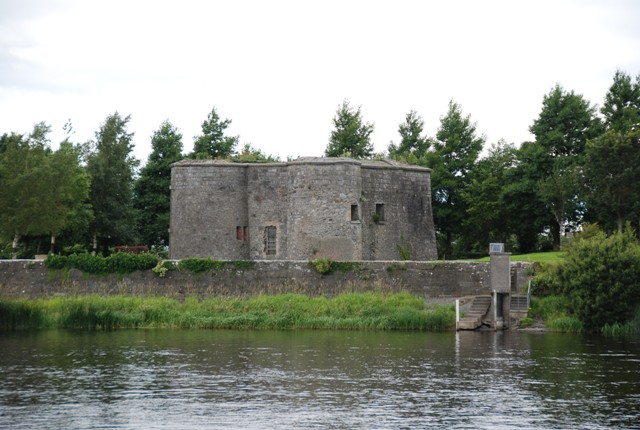
Cromwell's Castle

The structure that stands on what is known locally as the Canal Bank, called Cromwell's Castle, primarily derives its current form from work related to the Napoleonic Wars. Similar to the Martello Tower that stands opposite it, on the same bank of the river, Cromwell's Castle was largely reconstructed as a defensive position to repel any invading fleet coming upstream towards Banagher.

Previously, the English had established many forts on the Leinster bank of the river, including Fort Frankford and, later, Fort Falkland. The garrison at Fort Falkland was overrun by the forces of the Confederate Catholics in 1642 but was recaptured by Cromwell's army in 1650. The Cromwellians established a new fortification on the Connacht bank of the river leading up to the plantation of Connacht in 1654. The castle was modified in 1817 to enable it to mount artillery with a platform for a 24-pound traversing gun constructed on its roof. Its interior became a powder magazine and housed a garrison of 20 soldiers.

Having fallen somewhat into disrepair, the structure came under the care of the Banagher Branch of the Offaly Historical Society in the 1980s and considerable restoration work has been undertaken since then. The bank on which it stands is held in trust as a public amenity. Considerable works around the castle have also taken place and the castle, park and riverside walk are open to the public.

==== Cuba Court ====
Cuba Court, also known as Cuba House, was a house dating from the 1730s and may have been constructed by one George Frazer, a former Governor of Cuba and perhaps to a design of Sir Edward Lovett Pearce, who designed the Irish Houses of Parliament in Dublin. It is certainly known to have been constructed with money from the sugar plantations in Cuba. In his biography of Anthony Trollope, James Pope-Hennessy describes Cuba Court as "a fine example of an Irish country-house of the mid-eighteenth century in the manner of the Dublin architect, Pierce (sic). The building contained ... two circular rooms ... and an avenue of lime trees led to the front door." The Belfast writer, Maurice Craig, in Classic Irish Houses of the Middle Size (1976), describes Cuba Court as "perhaps the most splendidly masculine house in the whole country." Towards the end of the 18th century, Cuba Court was the home of Denis Bowes Daly, who was a prominent member of the local ascendancy. Prior to his death in 1821 he had leased Cuba Court to the Army Medical Board on a 61-year lease. The building was little used as a hospital and the Medical Board was quite happy to give it up to the Commissioners of Education for the Royal School, which had eventually been established as a result of the Royal Charter of 1621.

Charlotte Brontë spent her honeymoon at Cuba Court in 1854 following her marriage to Arthur Bell Nicholls (See Charlotte Brontë). She noted of Cuba Court: "It is very large and looks externally like a gentleman's country seat – within most of the rooms are lofty and spacious, and some – the drawing room and dining room are handsomely and commodiously furnished. The passages look desolate and bare – our bedroom, a great room of the ground floor, would have looked gloomy when we were shown into it but for the turf fire that was burning in the wide old chimney."

During the 1820s, the Royal School at Cuba Court was attended by Sir William Wilde, who later married the poet Jane Francesca Agnes Elgee. The couple had two sons: Willie and Oscar Wilde, and a daughter, Isola Francesca, who died in childhood. Another pupil at the school was William Bulfin, the journalist and writer associated with Argentina through his work Tales of the Pampas, who attended in the 1870s. His son, Eamon Bulfin was one of the main participants in the 1916 Easter Rising in Dublin and was sentenced to death, but this was commuted to deportation to Argentina where he had been born.

Due to the Irish policy on rates at the time, the house was unroofed in 1946 and this hastened its demise. Pope-Hennessy described Cuba Court in 1971: "Like so many of Ireland's great houses, Cuba Court is now being slowly but deliberately demolished. The lime trees have long since been hacked down." In spite of this, it was described as "a superb ruin that could tell the history of Ascendancy Ireland", as late as 1979. It was eventually acquired by a local businessman and demolished in the 1980s. Craig describes the loss of Cuba Court as "particularly to be lamented". A development of four houses was built on the site at Cuba Avenue in 2003. An archaeological survey revealed nothing of significance.

==== Fort Eliza ====
Fort Eliza, also known as the Salt Battery, is a freestanding five-sided four-gun battery, constructed around 1812, and standing on the east side of the River Shannon. Three sides face the river and were formed of broad parapets. The other two sides meet at the rear salient angle at a guardhouse, which is now ruined. The battery is surrounded by a dry moat, with the entrance originally across a drawbridge close to the guardhouse. At the centre of the enclosure was the brick-vaulted powder magazine. This fort, combined with Cromwell's Castle, the Martello tower and Fort Falkland would have protected both the town and the river crossing from all angles.

==== Martello Tower ====
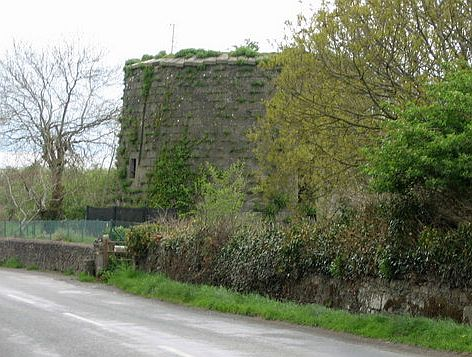
Martello Tower at Banagher

Martello towers (or simply Martellos) are small defensive forts built in several countries of the British Empire during the 19th century, from the time of the Napoleonic Wars onwards. They stand up to 40 feet (12 m) high (with two floors) and typically had a garrison of one officer and 15–25 men. Their round structure and thick walls of solid masonry made them resistant to cannon fire, while their height made them an ideal platform for a single heavy artillery piece, mounted on the flat roof and able to traverse a 360° arc. Fear of an invasion by Napoleon Bonaparte reached panic proportions amongst the authorities in Ireland and England in 1804 and the first towers were built in Ireland that year.

In case an invasion fleet tried to sail up the River Shannon, two towers were built on the middle reaches of the river to defend its crossing points. One of these was located at Meelick and the other at Banagher. The tower at Banagher is located on the west (Galway) bank of the river and measures 36 feet (11 m) in diameter and height. The tower was described in 1970 as having "... no corbels, a ridge around the top, much vegetation growing around it, and its general condition is fair."

==== Memorials and sculptures ====
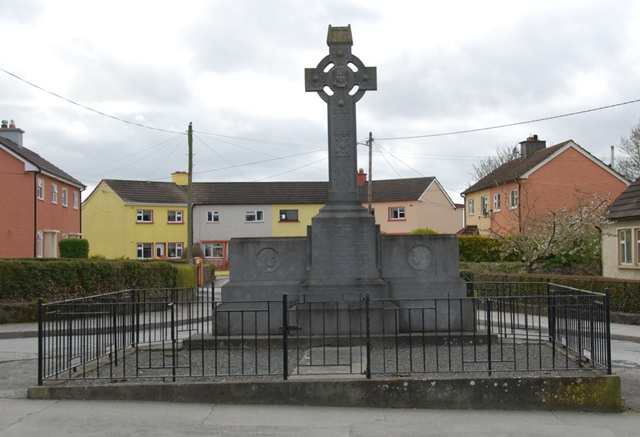
Barnes & McCormack Memorial

A memorial in the form of a stone Celtic Cross is situated at the eastern side of the town. It is known as the Barnes & McCormack Memorial and dedicated to two local men who were executed in Birmingham in 1940 for their involvement in the Coventry Explosion of 1939 in which five people died. The executions caused a public outcry in Britain and internationally as the men had admitted to constructing the bomb, which was intended to be used to destroy a power station, but claimed not to be involved in planting it. The cross was erected in 1963 by The Barnes & McCormack Memorial Committee in association with The National Graves Committee and bears an inscription in both Irish and English: "In commemoration of Staff Captain James McCormack and Company Captain Peter Barnes, Irish Republican Army, who for love of country, were executed by the British Government at Winson Green Prison, Birmingham on the 7th February 1940." The monument was sculpted by Desmond Broe of Dublin and features images of the two men, a female head representing Ireland and symbols of the four provinces.

In December 2011 the Zimbabwean artist, Parazai Havatitye, a sculptor who specialises in wood carving, created a sculpture from a tree stump, entitled The Musician, which is dedicated to the musician Johnny McEvoy, who was born in Banagher in 1945. The sculpture is located on the main road, at the gate of the marina.

=== Places of worship ===
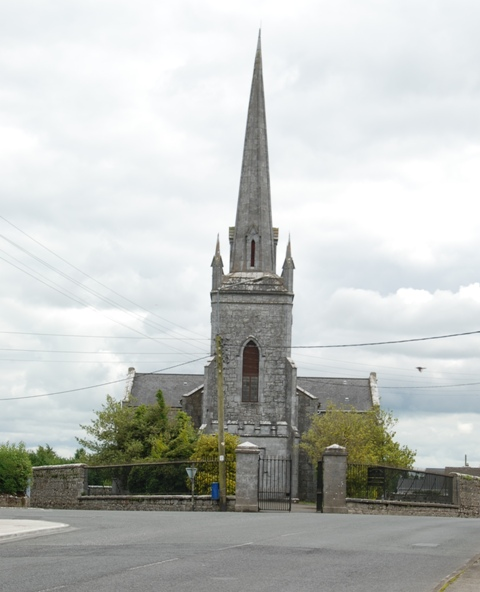
St. Paul's Church of Ireland

Arising from its history as a plantation garrison town, Banagher has active Catholic and Church of Ireland communities. The lane between Market Square and Pucka Lane (formerly Queen Street) is called Church Lane and it is here that the first church in Banagher was sited. The 6th-century abbey of St. Rynagh is now in ruins. This church later became the Church of the Blessed Mary in the 16th century, and was also known as the Church of Banagher. According to tradition, the Cross of Banagher once stood next to a crystal spring in the Market Square. The surviving sandstone shaft of the cross was found in the churchyard by a Birr antiquarian named Thomas Cooke in the 1840s and was in reasonable condition then as he described it in great detail in an article in the Transactions of the Kilkenny Archaeological Society in 1853. The stone that he found appears to have been part of a sepulchral or commemorative cross, set up at Banagher well to record the death of Bishop William O'Duffy, who was killed by a fall from his horse in 1297. Cooke had become so perturbed by the deterioration of the stone by 1852 that he had it removed to his residence in Birr. It is now housed in the National Museum of Ireland in Dublin.

St. Rynagh's Catholic Church

The Church of Ireland community had worshipped at the old church, which was in a ruinous state by 1829 when the new St. Paul's Church was built at the top of the hill, overlooking the town. An appraisal by the National Inventory of Architectural Heritage describes the church as having 'a handsome tower with spire', containing pre-Raphaelite stained glass windows by the English glass-maker Arthur Louis Moore of London, and 'the tall spire with pinnacles acting as a beacon to the local parishioners'. The most outstanding feature of St. Paul's Church is the Window of the Resurrection, a stained-glass window commemorating the Bell family that was originally intended for Westminster Abbey in London.

The new Catholic church of St. Rynagh's had been constructed some three years earlier and on land given by the Armstrongs, the most influential and wealthiest Protestant family in the area, who consistently and energetically advocated Catholic Emancipation and repeal of the Penal Laws. This situation demonstrated the friendly relations that existed between the two communities in Banagher during those difficult times for Catholics in Ireland. The church was built in 1825 with a bell-tower and spire added in 1872 to a design by William Hague Jr., a protégé of A.W.N. Pugin. An appraisal by the National Inventory of Architectural Heritage describes the later addition of a bell tower with an elaborate door surround and finely carved belfry openings as adding to the otherwise modest church. The appraisal also describe the tall stained glass lancet windows and a mandorla called The Madonna and Child carved in 1974 by German sculptor Imogen Stuart, as giving an artistic quality to the building.

=== Literature and the arts ===
Literary figures to have stayed at Banagher include Anthony Trollope, who used the town as an inspiration for his first novel The Macdermots of Ballycloran and Charlotte Brontë who married a curate who was raised in Banagher. The town is the source of the phrase: "Well, that beats Banagher!"

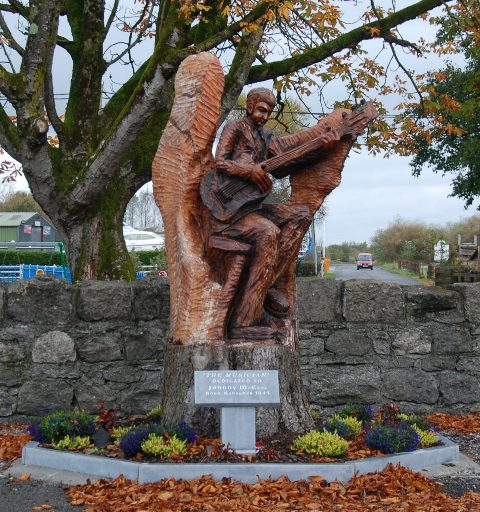
The Musician dedicated to Johnny McEvoy

The town was one of the settings for the series Pure Mule, as featured on RTÉ television. The mini-series was an RTÉ production and shot in 2005 in Banagher, Birr and Tullamore. The series was favourably received by some critics, although some locals maintained that it portrayed Midlanders in a bad light. The folk-singer Roger Whittaker took up residence in Banagher for about 10 years until 2006. During the time he purchased and renovated Lairakeen House.

==== Anthony Trollope ====
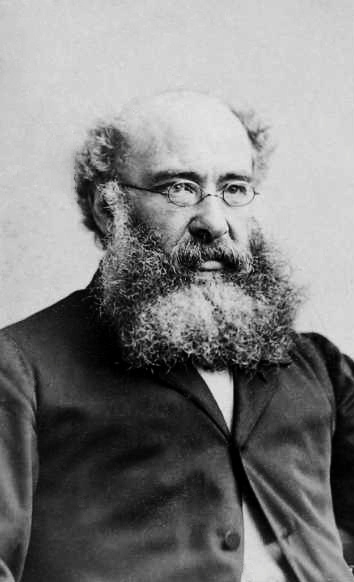
Anthony Trollope by Napoleon Sarony

Banagher's greatest literary association is with Anthony Trollope, who had been employed by the General Post Office in 1835 and was sent to Ireland in September 1841 at the age of 26. Trollope had had an unhappy life up to that point and remarked in his autobiography: "This was the first good fortune of my life." After landing in Dublin on 15 September, he travelled by canal-boat to Shannon Harbour and then on to Banagher, arriving on 16 September, which coincided with the second day of the annual Great Fair. Although very much smaller than the town of Birr, which is only eight miles away, Banagher had been chosen as the base of a Postal Surveyorship, probably because its position on the Shannon offered easy access by can boat to Dublin and Limerick.

Trollope established himself at The Shannon Hotel, a long bow-fronted Georgian building, which was over 100 years old at that time. The hotel, which still exists, is located at the bottom of the town, close to the river. The post office where Trollope worked was at the top of the town, which is a few minutes away on foot. Next to the post office was a two-roomed bungalow which was used by the Postal Surveyor and his new deputy as their working headquarters. This building is often erroneously considered to have been the residence of Trollope himself.

Although Trollope's initial knowledge of Ireland was limited, he soon noted that the Irish were good-humoured and clever – "...the working classes very much more intelligent than those in England. They were not, as they were reputed to be, spendthrifts, but were economical, hospitable and kind." Their chief defects, he judged, were that they could switch to being very perverse and very irrational and that they were "but little bound by the love of truth."

Trollope remained stationed at Banagher until late 1844 when he was transferred to Clonmel. It was while in Banagher that Trollope began to write his first novel, The Macdermots of Ballycloran. He had begun to contemplate this novel whilst walking outside Drumsna in County Leitrim where the ruins of Ballycloran House stood into the 1840s and were still there in the 1970s. Trollope had been up in Leitrim inspecting the accounts of an errant postmaster. He thought the ruins of Ballycloran "one of the most melancholy spots I had ever visited" and he later described it in the first chapter of his novel. Although his first novel was initially unsuccessful, Trollope was undeterred and in all, went on to write forty-seven novels, as well as dozens of short stories and a few books on travel. He returned to England in 1856 and by the mid-1860s had reached a fairly senior position within the Post Office hierarchy. Postal history credits him with introducing the pillar box (the ubiquitous bright red mail-box) to Britain. Anthony Trollope died in London in 1882 and is buried at Kensal Green Cemetery.

==== Charlotte Brontë ====
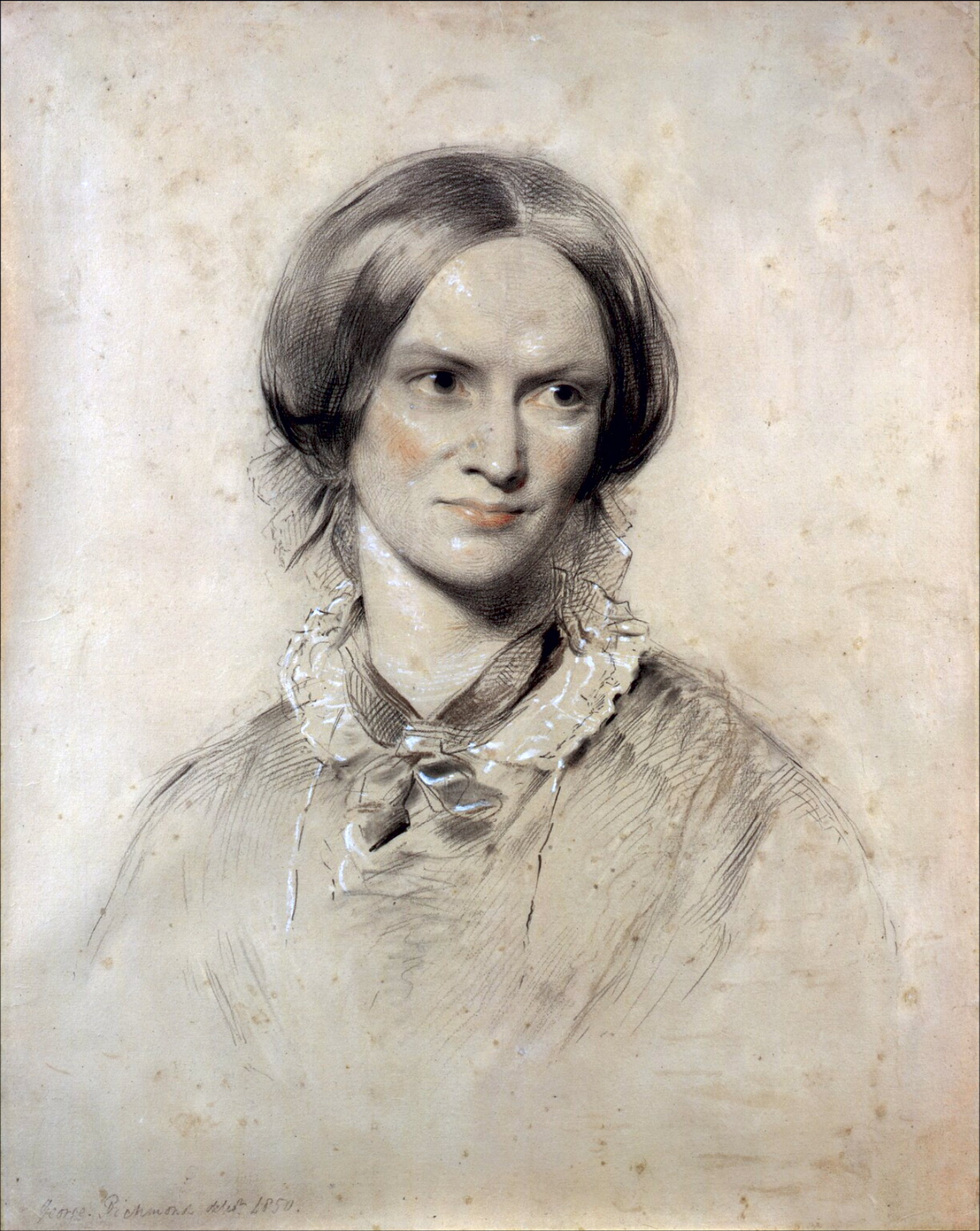
Charlotte Brontë by George Richmond, 1850

Charlotte Brontë had a brief association with Banagher in the mid-1850s when she married one Arthur Bell Nicholls, her father's curate. Nicholls was born of Scottish parents in County Antrim in 1818. He was orphaned early and subsequently brought up by his uncle, Alan Bell, in Banagher. Alan Bell was headmaster at the Royal School at Cuba Court at that time. The couple honeymooned in Ireland and stayed at Cuba Court for a period in June 1854. According to Pope-Hennessy, Mrs Nicholls disliked both Banagher and its inhabitants, although she greatly admired the surrounding countryside.

If Bell Nicholls was a poor unknown curate in England – in Banagher he was a member of a respectable family. In a letter quoted by Elizabeth Gaskell in her book The Life of Charlotte Brontë, Charlotte wrote: "My dear husband, too, appears in a new light in his own country. More than once I have had deep pleasure in hearing his praises on all sides. Some of the old servants and followers of the family tell me I am a most fortunate person; for that I have got one of the best gentlemen in the country... I trust I feel thankful to God for having enabled me to make what seems a right choice; and I pray to be enabled to repay as I ought the affectionate devotion of a truthful, honourable man."

In January 1855, Brontë discovered she was pregnant. It was accompanied by severe illness and she died on 31 March 1855, officially from tuberculosis. Mr Nicholls remained with Brontë's father for a further six years before returning to Banagher in 1861, taking with him his wife's portrait, her wedding dress (of which a copy has been made), some of Charlotte's letters and other mementoes. Forty years later, when the critic Clement Shorter prepared to write Charlotte Brontë and Her Circle, he found at Banagher among other relics, two diaries of Emily and Anne, in a tin box, and some of Charlotte's minute childhood writings wrapped in newspaper at the bottom of a drawer.

==== James Pope-Hennessy ====
James Pope-Hennessy came to Banagher in 1970 to write his biography of Anthony Trollope. Pope-Hennessy had published his first book, London Fabric in 1939, for which he was awarded the Hawthornden Prize and was a well-established biographer and travel writer by the time he arrived in Banagher. Among his works were a biography of Queen Mary for which he was rewarded by being created a Commander of the Royal Victorian Order in 1960, Verandah (1964) a biography of his grandfather, the Irish colonial governor John Pope-Hennessy and Sins of the Fathers (1967), an account of the Atlantic slave traffickers.

Like Trollope before him, Pope-Hennessy took rooms at The Shannon Hotel, near the river and set about trying to capture the essence of the town which had inspired Trollope's first novel, The Macdermots of Ballycloran. He proved to be a very popular figure in the town, evidenced by the fact that he was asked to adjudicate at a local beauty pageant and the horse fair. Pope-Hennessy gives particular mention to the Corcoran family, the proprietors of The Shannon Hotel in the 1960s and 1970s, for their help in the production of his work. They sold the hotel in 1977.

Pope-Hennessy stayed in Banagher from March 1970 to April 1971 and largely completed his study of Trollope during this time. The finished biography, Anthony Trollope, won the Whitbread Award for Biography in 1972 and is largely regarded as Pope-Hennessy's finest work since Queen Mary. Pope-Hennessy grew very fond of Banagher and returned to stay at The Shannon Hotel several times before his premature death in 1974. This is illustrated by his description of Banagher in Anthony Trollope: "... in Trollope's words, Banagher then seemed 'little more than a village'. It retains a quality of friendly village life to this day and can have changed little since Trollope's time, save that its population has declined to eleven hundred."

==== Sir Jonah Barrington ====
Sir Jonah Barrington was born in 1760 near Abbeyleix in the Queen's County (County Laois). He was first elected to Parliament as a member for Tuam in 1790. He lost this seat in 1798 and was elected as a member for Banagher in 1799. He voted against the Act of Union in 1801 and as a result, he was deprived of his £1,000 a year sinecure in the Customs House and this also stopped his further advancement. In 1809 he published, in five parts, the first volume of the Historic Memoirs of Ireland. It is thought that he was induced to delay the second volume – the English government shrinking from the exposure of their conduct in carrying the Act of Union, and it was understood that to purchase his silence he was permitted to reside in France from about 1815.

In 1827, he published two volumes of Personal Sketches of His Own Times. In 1830, by an address from both Houses of Parliament, he was removed from the Bench, in consequence of well-proven misappropriation of public money. The third volume of Personal Sketches appeared in 1833 as did the delayed volume of his Historic Memoirs. This book was subsequently reproduced in a cheaper form as The Rise and Fall of the Irish Nation. His works are interesting, racy, and valuable – although his statements of fact cannot always be depended on – containing much of personal incident, related in a fascinating style. He died at Versailles on 8 April 1834.

== In popular culture ==
The town of Banagher is most likely the source of a phrase that is widely known in many English speaking countries in the world. "That beats Banagher!" is a common reaction to something extraordinary or to describe something that surpasses everything. The most commonly proposed explanation is that Banagher was entitled to send two members to Parliament following its charter of incorporation in 1628. It was known as an infamous pocket borough where the members were representative of the landed class, or indeed nominated by the local lord, without a vote taking place at all. When a member of the house spoke of a family (or rotten) borough, it was not unusual for someone to reply "Well, that beats Banagher!"

An alternative explanation is suggested, whereby there was an Irish minstrel called Bannagher, who was famous for telling wonderful stories; and a line from W. B. Yeats gives this theory some credence: "'Well', says he, 'to gratify them I will. So just a morsel. But Jack, this beats Bannagher.'" There is also an entry in Captain Francis Grose's Dictionary of the Vulgar Tongue of 1785 which says: "He beats Banaghan; an Irish saying of one who tells wonderful stories. Perhaps Banaghan was a minstrel famous for dealing in the marvellous".

There are numerous uses of the phrase in literature, including Trollope's The Kelly's and the O'Kellys (1848), p. 221; James Joyce's Finnegans Wake (1939), p. 87.31; James Plunkett's Farewell Companions (1977), p. 293 and Edna O'Brien's Down by the River (1996), p. 1.

The phrase has a riposte: "And Banagher beats the Devil!". The origins of this are more difficult to trace but it does feature in a work by the Irish writer Brian Oswald Donn-Byrne, Messer Marco Polo (1925), p. 25, and it is in common usage in Ireland. Trollope asserted on his arrival in Ireland, "I was to live at a place called Banagher on the Shannon which I had heard of because of its having once been conquered, though it had heretofore conquered everything, including the Devil". John O'Donovan, in an Ordnance Survey letter for King's County in 1838, attempts to trace the origins of the name Banagher. He states: "Of all the words which enter into Irish nomenclature Beannchair seems the most difficult of explanation" and goes on to say "This name 'beats the Devil.'" M.F. Kenny in his 2003 book Marathon Marriage uses a story of the devil losing a game of cards to a blacksmith named Banagher at the Black Stile at Garry Castle on the road between Banagher and Birr, as an explanation for the phrase.

== Education ==
St. Rynagh's National School (NS) caters for children between the ages of 4 and 12 and accommodates approximately 200 students. Secondary education is provided by Banagher College (Coláiste na Sionna), a multi-denominational school under the responsibility of Laois and Offaly Education and Training Board. Banagher College is an amalgamation of La Sainte Union Secondary School and St. Rynagh's Community College. La Sainte Union is a voluntary Catholic School run by the Sisters of La Sainte-Union des Sacrés-Coeurs, a congregation founded in France in 1826 by Abbé Jean-Baptiste Debrabant to promote Christian education. The school was their first in Ireland and opened its doors in 1863 in a house on Main Street when the Abbé arrived with Mother Anatolie Badger and three sisters of the order.

St Rynagh's CC, originally known as Banagher Vocational School, opened in 1953 with 40 students enrolling under the guidance of the first principal, Ms Elsie Naughton. Amalgamation discussions began in 1999 and by November 2005 it was agreed that a new school be constructed on the La Sainte Union site. The school accommodates approximately 500 students.

== Sport ==
Banagher is home to St Rynagh's GAA Club, which was founded in 1961 and represents the parishes of Banagher and Cloghan, with hurling played at Banagher and football at Cloghan. St Rynagh's has won 20 Offaly Senior Hurling Championships (Sean Robins Cup) and dominated senior hurling in the county from the mid-1960s to the early 1990s. Outside of the county, St Rynagh's were the inaugural winners of the Leinster Senior Club Hurling Championship, in 1971 and have won the title on a further three occasions, 1973, 1983 and 1994. The club also contested the first All-Ireland Senior Club Hurling Championship final in 1971, losing to Roscrea from County Tipperary. Three St Rynagh's players have captained the Offaly county hurling team to All-Ireland success, Padraig Horan in 1981, Martin Hanamy in 1994 and Hubert Rigney in 1998. A number of St Rynagh's players have also won All Stars – Martin Hanamy (3), Aidan Fogarty (2), Damien Martin, Padraig Horan, Hubert Rigney and Michael Duignan. Damien Martin was the goalkeeper on the first All Stars team in 1971, effectively making him the first ever GAA All Star.

Banagher schools have won the All-Ireland Vocational Schools Championship on seven occasions. Banagher College were the most recent winners of the senior championship in 2010, with Banagher having won on three previous occasions, in 1985, 1986 and 1989. Banagher also won a junior championship in 1984 and St Rynagh's Banagher won a junior championship in 2004.

In 1910, Banagher won the Offaly Senior Football Championship title, playing as Banagher.

Soccer is also played in Banagher and the Banagher United club fields teams in the Midlands Senior and Junior Leagues.

A billiards and snooker hall is located between The Shannon Hotel and the Marina. There is a pitch and putt course located adjacent to Cromwell's Castle on the Canal Bank and part of the river on this bank has been enclosed to form a swimming pool. There is also a sub aqua club in the town.

== See also ==
- List of towns and villages in Ireland
- Banagher (Parliament of Ireland constituency)
