= Ger Coughlan =

Irish hurler

Personal information
- Native name: Gearóid Ó Cochlainn (Irish)
- Born: 31 October 1957 (age 69) Kinnity, County Offaly, Ireland
- Occupation: Agricultural adviser
- Height: 5 ft 7 in (170 cm)

Sport
- Sport: Hurling
- Position: Left wing-back
Club
- Years: Club
- Kinnitty
Club titles
- Offaly titles: 5
Inter-county
Years	County	Apps (scores)
1979-1990	Offaly	34 (0-00)
Inter-county titles
- Leinster titles: 7
- All-Irelands: 2
- NHL: 0
- All Stars: 2

Ger Coughlan (born 31 October 1957) is an Irish hurling manager, selector and former player. At club level, he played for Kinnitty and at inter-county level with the Offaly senior hurling team.

== Playing career ==
At club level, Coughlan first played hurling at juvenile and underage levels with the Kinnitty club, before progressing to adult level. He won consecutive Offaly SHC medals in 1978 and 1979, following respective defeats of St Rynagh's and Coolderry. Coughlan later won three consecutive Offaly SHC medals between 1983 and 1985.

Coughlan first played for the Offaly senior hurling team in a National Hurling League game against Tipperary in November 1979. He was part of the Offaly team that beat Kilkenny to win their inaugural Leinster SHC title in 1980. Coughlan claimed a second consecutive Leinster SHC title the following year, before lining out at wing-back in Offaly's 2–12 to 0–15 win over Galway in the 1981 All-Ireland SHC final. He ended the year by claiming the first of two All-Stars.

After winning another consective set of Leinster SHC medals in 1984 and 1985, Coughlan was again at wing-back when Offaly beat Galway by 2–11 to 1–12 in the 1985 All-Ireland SHC final. He won a further three consecutive Leinster SHC medals between 1988 and 1990. Coughlan played his 97th and final game for Offaly in a 1–16 to 2–07 defeat by Galway in the 1990 All-Ireland SHC semi-final.

== Management career ==
Coughlan first served as Offaly's minor team manager in 1996 and 1997. He was part of Pat Fleury's management team as a selector when the Offaly senior team were beaten by Kilkenny in the 2000 All-Ireland SHC final. Coughlan returned as Offaly's minor team manager for a second time in 2006, before taking charge of the Offaly under-21 team in 2012. He later returned to Offaly's senior team as a selector as part of Brian Whelehan's management team in 2013.

== Honours ==
Kinnitty

- Offaly Senior Hurling Championship (5): 1978, 1979, 1983, 1984, 1985

Offaly

- All-Ireland Senior Hurling Championship (2): 1981, 1985
- Leinster Senior Hurling Championship (7): 1980, 1981, 1984, 1985, 1988, 1989, 1990

Awards

- All-Stars (2): 1981, 1985

Sporting positions
Preceded by Johnny Dooley	Offaly minor hurling team manager 2006-2007	Succeeded by Johnny Pilkington
Preceded by Paddy Kirwan	Offaly under-21 hurling team manager 2012-2013	Succeeded by
