= List of Offaly senior hurling team captains =

This article lists players who have captained the Offaly county hurling team in the Leinster Senior Hurling Championship and the All-Ireland Senior Hurling Championship.

== List of captains ==
Year	Player	Club	National titles	Provincial titles
1980	Pádraig Horan	St Rynagh's		
1981	Pádraig Horan	St Rynagh's	All-Ireland Hurling Final winning captain	Leinster Hurling Final winning captain
1982	Pat Carroll	Coolderry		
1983	Pat Carroll	Coolderry		
1984	Pat Fleury	Drumcullen		Leinster Hurling Final winning captain
1985	Pat Fleury	Drumcullen	All-Ireland Hurling Final winning captain	Leinster Hurling Final winning captain
1986	Pat Delaney	Kinnitty		
1987	Joachim Kelly	Lusmagh		
1988				Leinster Hurling Final winning captain
1989	Mark Corrigan	Kinnitty		Leinster Hurling Final winning captain
1990	Jim Troy	Lusmagh		Leinster Hurling Final winning captain
1991				
1992				
1993				
1994	Martin Hanamy	St Rynagh's	All-Ireland Hurling Final winning captain	Leinster Hurling Final winning captain
1995	Johnny Pilkington	Birr		Leinster Hurling Final winning captain
1996	Shane McGuckin			
1997				
1998	Hubert Rigney	St Rynagh's	All-Ireland Hurling Final winning captain	
1999	Brian Whelahan	Birr		
2000	Johnny Dooley	Seir Kieran		
2001				
2002	Joe Errity	Birr		
2003	Gary Hanniffy	Birr		
2004	Gary Hanniffy	Birr		
2005	Barry Teehan	Coolderry		
2006	Brendan Murphy	Ballyskenagh		
2007	Rory Hanniffy	Birr		
2008	Kevin Brady	Coolderry		
2009	Ger Oakley	Carrig and Riverstown		
2010	Brian Carroll	Coolderry		
2011	Shane Dooley	Tullamore		
2012	David Kenny	Belmont		
2013	David Kenny	Belmont		
2014	Joe Bergin	Seir Kieran		
2015	Dan Currams	Kilcormac–Killoughey		
2016	Colin Egan	Belmont		
2017	Seán Ryan	Birr		
2018	David King	Coolderry		
2019	Shane Dooley	Tullamore		
2020				
2021	Ben Conneely	St Rynagh's		
2022				
2023	Jason Sampson			
2024	Jason Sampson			
2025				
2026				
