= 1986 Offaly Senior Hurling Championship =

Annual hurling competition season

- Champions: Coolderry (26th title); Noel Teehan (captain)
- Runners-up: St Rynagh's; Seán White (captain)

The 1986 Offaly Senior Hurling Championship was the 89th staging of the Offaly Senior Hurling Championship since its establishment by the Offaly County Board in 1896.

Kinnitty entered the championship as the defending champions.

The final was played on 19 October 1986 at St Brendan's Park in Birr, between Coolderry and St Rynagh's, in what was their sixth meeting in the final. Coolderry won the match by 3–08 to 1–10 to claim their 26th championship title overall and a fist championship title in six years.

== Results ==
=== Final ===
19 October 1986 Final	Coolderry	3-08 - 1-10	St Rynagh's	St Brendan's Park
