= 1984 All-Ireland Senior Hurling Championship final =

1984 All-Ireland Senior Hurling Final
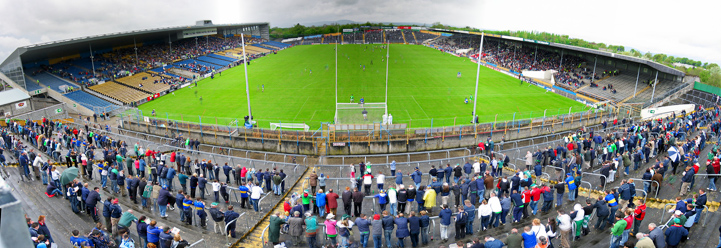
- Event: 1984 All-Ireland Senior Hurling Championship
Cork	Offaly
3–16	1–12
- Date: 2 September 1984
- Venue: Semple Stadium, Thurles
- Referee: Paschal Long (Kilkenny)
- Attendance: 59,814

The 1984 All-Ireland Senior Hurling Championship Final was a hurling match which took place on Sunday, 2 September 1984 at Semple Stadium in Thurles that decided the winner of the 1984 season of the All-Ireland Senior Hurling Championship. The winners received the Liam MacCarthy Cup. The 1984 final, regarded as the Centenary Year final due to the foundation of the Gaelic Athletic Association one hundred years previously in 1884, was the culmination of the 98th season of the championship, and the 97th final overall.

The final was contested by the Munster champions Cork and the Leinster champions Offaly, a first ever championship meeting between the two sides. Throw-in was at 15:30 IST. The referee for the match was Paschal Long from Kilkenny. The venue, Semple Stadium, hosted its first and to date only All-Ireland final, having been chosen as a gesture to the cradle town of the GAA on the association's centenary anniversary.

Cork, the all-time roll of honour leaders, had last won in 1978 and were making their third consecutive appearance in the competition's final, having lost to Kilkenny in both 1982 and 1983. Offaly were appearing in their second ever final, having won the championship in 1981. After defeating Limerick and Tipperary in the Munster Championship, Cork beat Antrim in the All-Ireland semi-final to qualify for the final, while Offaly accounted for Dublin and Wexford in the Leinster Championship before defeating Galway.

Cork took a narrow one-point lead at half-time courtesy of a Seánie O'Leary goal, however, second-half goals by Kevin Hennessy and a second by O'Leary secured the All-Ireland for Cork. It was their 25th All-Ireland title in all, and their first in six years.

== Venue ==
Since 1912 Croke Park in Dublin had been the regular venue for the annual All-Ireland final. In 1934, in anticipation of the All-Ireland final being held at the then Thurles Sportsfield as part of the golden jubilee celebrations of the GAA, extensive improvements were made to bring the field requirements up to the demands which a crowd of up to 60,000 would make. That game, however, was still played at Croke Park. Only once was the All-Ireland final held outside of Dublin when, due to a Croke Park builders' strike, FitzGerald Stadium in Killarney was the venue for the 1937 championship decider.

Semple Stadium was announced as the venue of the 1984 All-Ireland final at the GAA's annual Congress on 28 March 1981. The decision to award the final to the Thurles venue was passed by a considerable majority, however, there were some question marks about its suitability and its capacity, most notably from the GAA president Paddy McFlynn and from the GAA's director-general Liam Mulvihill. There was further criticism of the decision from the Galway County Board, however, at the 1982 Congress the decision was copper-fastened.

== Route to the final ==
Cork		Round	Offaly
Opponent	Result	Provincial stage	Opponent	Result
Limerick	3-15 - 2-13	Semi-final	Dublin	2-11 - 1-11
Tipperary	4-15 - 3-14	Final	Wexford	1-15 - 2-11
Opponent	Result	All-Ireland stage	Opponent	Result
Antrim	3-26 - 2-5	Semi-final	Galway	4-15 - 1-10

=== Cork ===
Cork's opening game of the championship was a Munster semi-final meeting with Limerick at the Gaelic Grounds. In a game billed as the potential game of the year, 'the Rebels' went in as underdogs against the recently crowned National Hurling League champions. The title of underdogs seemed accurate as Limerick had a half-time lead of 1–10 to 1–5. Cork were a transformed side after the interval and held Limerick scoreless for the first twelve minutes of the half while helping themselves to 1–6. The goal was scored when the Limerick full-back, Leonard Enright, topped the ball as he tried to clear off the ground and it spun back, struck the goalkeeper and into the path of Jimmy Barry-Murphy who guided it over the line. A great second-half followed, however, Cork proved the experts wrong and secured a 3–15 to 2–13 victory.

The subsequent Munster final saw Cork play Tipperary. It was their first meeting in the provincial decider since the 1970 Munster final. Regarded at the time as the 'best ever', the game was a classic encounter, however, the final seven minutes have entered Munster folklore. Cork trailed Tipp by four points with seven minutes left and the game looked lost. John Fenton launched the comeback with a point before Tony O'Sullivan sent the sliotar crashing into the net for an equalising goal. A draw seemed likely, however, a Tipp attack was halted and turned into a Cork one. O'Sullivan tried for the winning point, however, his shot was stopped by the goalkeeper only to fall to the hurley of Seánie O'Leary who scored the winning goal. John Fenton tacked on an insurance point to give Cork the centenary year Munster title.

Cork's next game was an All-Ireland semi-final against Antrim. The Ulster team were apathetic about the match and it was reported in the media that some players weren't even training for the game. The game was seen as a foregone conclusion, however, Antrim put in a good display for the opening thirty minutes. The end result was never in doubt and Cork booked their place in the All-Ireland final with a 3–26 to 2–5 victory.

=== Offaly ===
Offaly's championship opener was a Leinster semi-final meeting with Dublin. The midlanders were the warm favourites to win that game and to take the provincial title. Offaly did not have it all their own way and their victory came about largely through squandered scoring opportunities from Dublin. Three penalties were awarded during the game with Dublin failing to score from two while Offaly converted a goal from their penalty and avoided an upset.

The subsequent Leinster final pitted Offaly against Wexford. Both sides had mixed fortunes in their respective semi-finals with Wexford putting in a great display in defeating three-in-a-row hopefuls Kilkenny while Offaly had a laboured victory over 'the Dubs'. Because of this Offaly went into the provincial decider as underdogs. The game itself was an exciting affair with the result in doubt right up to the full-time whistle. The game ended in controversy as the referee, Pascal Long, played only one minute and five-second of injury time, when as least three minutes had been lost due to injuries. Overall, Offaly were regarded as the better team for two-thirds of the game and their 1–15 to 2–11 victory was well merited.

Offaly's next game was an All-Ireland semi-final meeting with Galway. While Offaly had been improving in each of their games during the championship, this was Galway's second game after an opener against Westmeath. Because of this Offaly were tentatively given the nod to win and advance to the final, however, Galway were seen as dangerous when they were underdogs. Offaly had little difficulty in overwhelming the westerners and a 4–15 to 1–10 victory gave them a safe passage to the All-Ireland final.

== Background ==
The All-Ireland final was a unique occasion as it was the first championship meeting between Cork and Offaly.

Cork enjoyed a hugely successful decade in the seventies, winning four All-Ireland finals including three championships in-a-row. By the early 1980s many of the players from that team decided to retire and, after a period of transition in 1980 and 1981, a new Cork team emerged to take back-to-back Munster titles in 1982 and 1983. Cork also contested the All-Ireland finals in both those years, however, they were defeated by their great rivals Kilkenny on both occasions. The thought of becoming the first team to lose three All-Ireland finals in-a-row proved a great motivation.

In 1981 Offaly became the thirteenth team to win the All-Ireland title when they defeated Galway to take their first championship. A victory in the centenary year final would preserved their 100% record in All-Ireland deciders.

== Pre-match ==
=== Referee ===
Pascal Long from the Carrickshock club in Kilkenny was named as the referee for the 1984 All-Ireland final on 21 August 1984. It was his first time taking charge of an All-Ireland decider, however, he had been a regular referee during the National Hurling League. Long had also experienced both Cork and Offaly in earlier games in 1984. He took charge of Offaly's Leinster final win over Wexford and was also in charge for Cork's defeat of Antrim in the All-Ireland semi-final.

=== Overview ===
Sunday 2 September was the date of the 1984 centenary All-Ireland senior hurling final between Cork and Offaly. It was Cork's third consecutive appearance in the final, after suffering two defeats by Kilkenny in 1982 and 1983, while Offaly were lining out in their first championship decider since they won the title in 1981. In spite of the GAA celebrating its 100th anniversary, this was the first ever championship meeting between these two sides. An interesting fact about Cork on All Ireland Final day was that they decided to forgo all the pre match hype and prepared behind 'closed doors' in the grounds of the Ursuline Convent in Thurles. This was a closely guarded secret and even some officials of the Cork County Board were unaware of the team's whereabouts in the run up to throw in.

Since 1914, Croke Park in Dublin had been the home of the All-Ireland senior hurling final every year. Only in 1937 had the championship decider moved out of the capital city to FitzGerald Stadium in Killarney. 1984, however, was special as it was the centenary year of the Gaelic Athletic Association. To mark the occasion it was deemed fitting that the All-Ireland final be played in the "home of hurling" and the town where the association was established. Because of this Semple Stadium in Thurles was the venue for this very special championship final.

The weather on the day was fine and sunny; however, it was also a very humid day which resulted in many players suffering the effects of fatigue by the end of the game.

Both sides lined out in their usual jerseys. Offaly wore their green, white and gold strip while Cork lined out in their traditional red jerseys. There was one special change to the Cork strip that was introduced prior to the game. The Cork jersey now had the word 'Corcaigh' emblazoned across the front while the jersey also contained the GAA centenary logo. Only one set of these jerseys were made.

=== Pre-match celebrations ===
As part of the centenary celebrations a special presentation took place prior to the game itself. All living former All-Ireland winning captains were given a special introduction onto the field. On that occasion the 60,000 spectators took to their feet as they witnessed some of the greatest hurlers in the history of the game take to the field. RTÉ's Michael O'Hehir acted as master of ceremonies as 38 captains from 40 All-Ireland-winning teams were introduced to and congratulated by the President of the Gaelic Athletic Association Paddy Buggy.

Liam Fennelly, Kilkenny's All-Ireland-winning captain from 1983, was the first captain to be introduced to the crowd. He was shortly followed by his team mate Brian Cody who captained the first leg of Kilkenny's back-to-back successes in 1982. Joe Connolly, Galway's first All-Ireland winning captain in 57 years, received a warm welcome as he arrived on the pitch. The third Kilkennyman of the day, Ger Fennelly, was presented as the All-Ireland-winning captain of 1979 before three Corkmen, Charlie McCarthy, Martin O'Doherty and Ray Cummins, made their way onto the pitch as representatives of Cork's three-in-a-row of titles between 1976 and 1978. Billy Fitzpatrick and Nicky Orr were next onto the field as Kilkenny's winning captains of 1974 and 1975, respectively. They were followed by Éamonn Grimes, the last man to captain Limerick to a championship title in 1973. Noel Skehan, one of the greatest goalkeepers of all-time, took to the field as the All-Ireland-winning captain of 1972.

The 1970s began with Tipperary and Cork being respectively represented by Tadhg O'Connor and Paddy Barry. Kilkenny's captain from 1969 and a player regarded as one of the greatest forwards of all time, Eddie Keher, was introduced next. Keher was followed onto the field of play by Wexford's 1968 captain, Dan Quigley, and Kilkenny's 1967 captain, Jim Treacy. At the time Quigley was the last Wexford man to captain his county to the All-Ireland title. Gerald McCarthy was one of the youngest captains to take to the field. He was only twenty years-old when he guided Cork to the All-Ireland title in 1966. He was followed by Mick Murphy, Tipperary's victorious captain of 1964 and Séamus Cleere, Kilkenny's captain of 1963. Jimmy Doyle, regarded by many as one of the greatest players of all time and the All-Ireland winning captain of 1962 and 1965, was followed by Matt Hassett who guided Tipperary to the title in 1961. Frankie Walsh of Waterford, the last man to captain his county to a championship, followed before Tipperary's 1958 All-Ireland-winning captain Tony Wall took to the field.

Kilkenny's 1957 captain, Mickey Kelly, was followed by Jim English of Wexford who captained the team in a memorable decider in 1956. He was followed by his team mate Nick O'Donnell, widely regarded as the greatest full-back of them all, who captained Wexford to the first leg of an All-Ireland double in 1955 before claiming the Liam MacCarthy Cup for a second time as captain in 1960. Paddy Barry of Cork's 1952 All-Ireland-winning team was followed by Tipperary's Jimmy Finn, Seán Kenny and Pat Stakelum, who captained their county to three successive titles between 1949 and 1951. They were followed by another Tipperary captain, John Maher, who captained the team to All-Ireland honours in 1945.

Cork were heavily represented throughout the early part of the 1940s with Seán Condon captaining the team to a fourth successive All-Ireland championship in 1944. He was followed by Mick Kennefick who helped Cork to the third title in that famous quartet of championship successes. The biggest cheer of the day was reserved for Jack Lynch, Cork's All-Ireland-winning captain of 1942 and former Taoiseach, who brought the proceedings to a halt after receiving a thirty-second ovation from the large Cork contingent. Connie Buckley, the fourth Corkman in succession, followed Lynch as the All-Ireland-winning captain of 1941. Tipperary native Mick Daniels was the last man to captain Dublin to a championship in 1938 while Jimmy Lanigan captained Tipperary to the All-Ireland title in Fitzgerald Stadium in 1937. The last captain to be introduced to the crowd was 84-year-old Eudie Coughlan of Cork who steered Cork to the championship following a three-game saga with Kilkenny in 1931.

=== Match report ===
With the pre-match festivities completed the game began. The opening minutes were played at a frantic pace with the Offaly men testing the Cork defence and Ger Cunningham's goalkeeping skills after just a few seconds of play. The opening score of the day came for Cork when John Fenton converted a free for his team after just one minute. The next five minutes saw Mark Corrigan record two wides for Offaly while Fenton sent the sliothar wide for Cork after a sideline cut. On the stroke of six minutes Pat Carroll put Offaly on the scoreboard when he converted a point from play. Pádraig Horan put Offaly in the lead less than a minute later when he scored another point. Cork's Tony O'Sullivan levelled the scores less than a minute later before Horan gave his side a 0–3 to 0–2 lead once again after converting a free. The next passage of play saw Cork's confidence diminish as Tim Crowley, Pat Hartnett and John Fenton recorded three consecutive wides for Cork. Pat Delaney did likewise for Offaly shortly afterwards when he sent a '65 wide.

The next passage of play saw both sides record tit-for-tat scores once again. A Tony O'Sullivan point levelled the scores for the third time of the match before Pat Delaney sent over '65 to give Offaly the narrowest of leads once again. Cork rallied once again with O'Sullivan scoring an inspirational point from an almost impossible angle by the sideline. Ironically, he missed a relatively easy score shortly afterwards. Mark Corrigan captured Offaly's fifth point of the day after twenty-two minutes of play before he too sent his next shot wide. Pat Carroll increased the margin between the two teams when he also scored a point to put Offaly ahead by 0–6 to 0–4. This period of dominance was negated just a few minutes later when Cork captured the first goal of the day. Jimmy Barry-Murphy, who was largely anonymous up until that point, sent a pass into Seánie O'Leary. O'Leary controlled the sliothar on his hurley before sending it past Damien Martin into the Offaly net. After being two points down Cork were now ahead by a point. Offaly went on the attack immediately after the puck out, however, Pat Carroll's shot went just wide of the post. John Fenton missed the chance to put Cork two points ahead when his shot also went wide for the fourth time, however, Tomás Mulcahy increased the margin when he got Cork's last score of the first half. Mark Corrigan recorded Offaly's last score of the half when he pointed just on the stroke of half-time. The score at the interval gave Cork a narrow lead of 1–5 to 0–7.

While the first half was a close affair Cork took over completely in the second. John Fenton stretched Cork's lead to two points when he sent over a free shortly after the restart. Cork went on the rampage after this score with five more unanswered points courtesy of Tony O'Sullivan, John Fenton, Seánie O'Leary, Fenton again and O'Sullivan again. At this point it looked as if the game was running away from Offaly; however, Cork did not relent. A Kevin Hennessy shot on goal was blocked by goalkeeper Damien Martin; however, it landed into the waiting hand of Jimmy Barry-Murphy who sent a low shot into the goal. That shot was also blocked but only as far as Kevin Hennessy who had the simplest of taps into the Offaly net for Cork's second goal. This gave Cork a ten-point lead with a score line of 2–11 to 0–7. Offaly fought back but Joe Dooley's shot on goal was saved by Ger Cunningham and was sent out over the line. Pat Delaney converted the subsequent '65 to reduce the deficit and to record Offaly's first score of the second half after seventeen minutes. Just when Offaly were getting back into the swing of things Cork went on the rampage again. A long clearance by Johnny Crowley bounced just in front of Seánie O'Leary who broke away from his marker and goaled for the third time for Cork. It was a personal triumph for O'Leary, Cork's longest-serving player. Cork now led by 3–11 to 0–8.

Pat Delaney reduced the deficit with a '65 and then with a free shortly afterwards, however, Offaly still trailed by ten points. John Fenton increased Cork's lead even more when he captured his first point from play shortly a Joe Dooley shot went wide. Both sides exchanged tit-for-tat scores once again for the final eight minutes of the game. Tony O'Sullivan stretched Corks' lead once again before Pat Carroll clawed one back for Offaly. John Fenton captured his second point from play on the stroke of the sixty-sixth minute before Pat Carroll reduced Cork's lead once again with another point for Offaly. Just at the end of normal playing time Mark Corrigan scored a goal for Offaly, however, it was too little too late as Cork still led by eight points. This was Offaly's last score of the game as John Fenton finished of his game with a seventh point. Pat Hartnett, Fenton's partner at midfield, then sent over the final point of the day as a huge cheer erupted from the Cork fans at the sight of Hartnett with his fist clenched in delight at the 3–16 to 1–12 score line. The full-time whistle was blown immediately after the puck out and Cork had captured their twenty-fifth All-Ireland title.

== Match details ==
=== Statistics ===
2 September 1984
15:30 BST

Cork	3–16 – 1–12	Offaly
S. O'Leary (2–1); J.Fenton (0–7)(4f); T. O'Sullivan (0–6); K. Hennessy (1–0); T. Mulcahy (0–1); P. Hartnett (0–1)		M. Corrigan (1–2); P. Carroll (0–4); P. Delaney (0–4)(1f, 3 65's); P. Horan (0–2)(1f)

Semple Stadium, Thurles
Attendance: 59,814
Referee: Paschal Long (Kilkenny)

Cork	Offaly

CORK:
GK	1	Ger Cunningham
RCB	2	Denis Mulcahy
FB	3	Dónal O'Grady
LCB	4	John Hodgins
RWB	5	Tom Cashman
CB	6	Johnny Crowley
LWB	7	Dermot Mac Curtain
M	8	John Fenton (c)
M	9	Pat Hartnett
RWF	10	Kevin Hennessy
CF	11	Tim Crowley
LWF	12	Tony O'Sullivan
RCF	13	Tomás Mulcahy
FF	14	Jimmy Barry-Murphy
LCF	15	Seánie O'Leary

OFFALY:
GK	1	Damien Martin
RCB	2	Liam Carroll
FB	3	Eugene Coughlan
LCB	4	Pat Fleury (c)
RWB	5	Aidan Fogarty
CB	6	Pat Delaney
LWB	7	Ger Coughlan
M	8	Tom Conneely
M	9	Joachim Kelly
RWF	10	Mark Corrigan
CF	11	Brendan Bermingham (substituted off) 42'
LWF	12	Pat Carroll
RCF	13	Declan Fogarty
FF	14	Pádraig Horan
LCF	15	Joe Dooley (substituted off) 62'
Substitutes:
CF		Paddy Corrigan (substituted on) 42'
LCF		Paddy Kirwan (substituted on) 62'

MATCH RULES
- 70 minutes.
- Replay if scores level.
- Three named substitutes

Cork Substitutes Ger The King Power, John Blake, Pat Horgan, Johnny Buckley, Denis Walsh, Bertie Og Murphy, John Hartnett Coaches Fr Michael O'Brien and Justin McCarthy Trainer Noel Collins Selectors Joe Desmond, Denis Hurley, Tom Monaghan
