= Johnny Flaherty =

Irish hurler (1949–2023)

Personal information
- Native name: Seán Ó Flathartaigh (Irish)
- Nickname: The Kinnitty King
- Born: 1947 Dublin, Ireland
- Died: 20 December 2023 (aged 76) Tullamore, County Offaly, Ireland
- Occupation: Businessman
- Height: 5 ft 7 in (170 cm)

Sport
- Sport: Hurling
- Position: Left corner-forward
Club
- Years: Club
- 1964-1993: Kinnitty
Club titles
- Offaly titles: 6
Inter-county
Years	County	Apps (scores)
1966-1983	Offaly	26 (11-36)
Inter-county titles
- Leinster titles: 2
- All-Irelands: 1
- All Stars: 1

John Flaherty (1947 – 20 December 2023) was an Irish hurler. He lined out at club level with Kinnitty and also played at inter-county level with Offaly. Flaherty usually lined out as a forward.

== Playing career ==
Flaherty first played hurling at juvenile level with Kinnitty, winning an U-16 county medal in 1957. He made his senior team debut at the age of 17 and won an Offaly JHC medal in 1966 after losing the final the previous year. Flaherty claimed an Offaly SHC medal in 1967, after scoring 1–08 in the defeat of Coolderry. After emigrating to New York in the 1970s, he lined out with various Offaly teams in the city. Flaherty returned to Kinnitty and won further Offaly SHC titles in 1978 and 1979.

Flaherty first played for Offaly as a minor before progressing to the under-21 and intermediate teams. He made his first appearance for the senior team in the 1966-67 National League. Flaherty scored three points in Offaly's defeat by Kilkenny in the 1969 Leinster final. Working abroad impacted on his hurling career and, while he made some appearances for Offaly in 1973 and 1974, he didn't play at all in 1972 or from 1975 to 1978. In spite of this, Flaherty was a member of the Leinster team that won the Railway Cup title in 1971.

Flaherty was top scorer when Offaly won their first ever Leinster SHC title in 1980. He claimed a second provincial title the following year before winning an All-Ireland SHC medal after scoring a famous handpassed goal in the All-Ireland final defeat of Galway. Flaherty was later presented with an All Star.

After bringing his inter-county career to an end in 1983, Flaherty continued to line out for his club. He was part of the Kinnitty team that won three successive Offaly SHC title from 1983 to 1985. Flaherty brought his club hurling career to an end in 1993 when, at 46, he scored 1–03 as Kinnitty beat Crinkle to claim the Offaly JHC title.

== Coaching career ==
Flaherty first became involved in team management and coaching when he took charge of the Westmeath senior hurling team. He guided the team to a Kehoe Cup victory in 1983. Flaherty managed his adopted club of Tullamore to the Offaly IHC title in 1989 and the Offaly SBHC title in 1990. He also took charge of the Offaly senior camogie team.

== Death ==
Flaherty died on 20 December 2023, at the age of 76.

== Honours ==
=== Player ===
Kinnitty

- Offaly Senior Hurling Championship: 1967, 1978, 1979, 1983, 1984, 1985
- Offaly Junior Hurling Championship: 1966, 1993

Westmeath

- Kehoe Cup: 1983

Offaly

- All-Ireland Senior Hurling Championship: 1981
- Leinster Senior Hurling Championship: 1980, 1981

Leinster

- Railway Cup: 1971

=== Management ===
Tullamore

- Offaly Senior B Hurling Championship: 1990
- Offaly Intermediate Hurling Championship: 1989
