= 1980 Offaly Senior Hurling Championship =

Annual hurling competition season

- Champions: Coolderry (25th title); Pat Carroll (captain)
- Runners-up: Kinnitty; Mick Bergin (captain)

The 1980 Offaly Senior Hurling Championship was the 83rd staging of the Offaly Senior Hurling Championship since its establishment by the Offaly County Board in 1896.

Kinnitty entered the championship as the defending champions.

The final was played on 6 October 1980 at St Brendan's Park in Birr, between Coolderry and Kinnitty, in what was their sixth meeting in the final overall. Coolderry won the match by 3–03 to 1–05 to claim their 25th championship title overall and a first championship title in three years.

== Results ==
=== Semi-finals ===
14 September 1980 Semi-final	Kinnitty	2-12 - 3-08	Birr	St Brendan's Park
	M Corrigan 1-3, J Flaherty 1-2, P Delaney 0-3, T Carroll 0-1, B Kennedy 0-1, D Egan 0-1, P Corrigan 0-1.		PJ Whelahan 2-0, M Cashin 0-5, J Verney 1-1, A Rosney 0-2.

14 September 1980 Semi-final	Coolderry	1-11 - 0-08	St Rynagh's	St Brendan's Park
	O Kennedy 1-1, P Moloughney 0-4, D Loughnane 0-2, M Kennedy 0-2, L Hogan 0-1, C Loughnane 0-1.		G Dolan 0-2, T Kenneally 0-2, T Lucas 0-2, JJ Devery 0-1, D Fogarty 0-1.

=== Final ===
5 October 1980 Final	Coolderry	3-03 - 1-05	Kinnitty	St Brendan's Park
	S Kennedy 2-0, P Carroll 1-0, O Kennedy 0-2, M Kennedy 0-1.		J Flaherty 1-1, M Corrigan 0-2, P Delaney 0-1, J Egan 0-1.
