= Pat Delaney (Offaly hurler) =

Irish hurler and manager

Personal information
- Native name: Pádraig Ó Dúláinne (Irish)
- Born: 27 July 1955 (age 71) Kinnitty, County Offaly, Ireland
- Occupation: Dept. of Agriculture officer
- Height: 6 ft 1 in (185 cm)

Sport
- Sport: Hurling
- Position: Centre-back
Club
- Years: Club
- Kinnitty
Club titles
- Offaly titles: 5
Inter-county
Years	County	Apps (scores)
1974-1989	Offaly	36 (3-41)
Inter-county titles
- Leinster titles: 6
- All-Irelands: 2
- NHL: 0
- All Stars: 1

Patrick Delaney (born 27 July 1954) is an Irish hurling manager and former player. At club level, he played with Kinnitty and at inter-county level with the Offaly senior hurling team.

== Playing career ==
At club level, Delaney first played hurling at juvenile and underage levels with the Kinnitty club, before progressing to adult level. He won consecutive Offaly SHC medals in 1978 and 1979, following respective defeats of St Rynagh's and Coolderry. Delaney won his third Offaly SHC title when he captained Kinnitty to a 0–20 to 2–06 win over St Rynagh's in 1983. These were followed by further Offaly SHC title wins in 1984 and 1985.

At inter-county level, Delaney first played for Offaly as a member of the minor team in 1973. He later spent two consecutive years with the under-21 team, but ended his underage career without silverware. Delaney made his senior team debut in a National Hurling League game against Antrim in October 1974.

Delaney was part of the Offaly team that beat Kilkenny to win their inaugural Leinster SHC title in 1980. He claimed a second consecutive Leinster SHC title the following year, before lining out at centre-back in Offaly's 2–12 to 0–15 win over Galway in the 1981 All-Ireland SHC final. Delaney ended the year by being named Texaco Hurler of the Year.

After winning another consective set of Leinster SHC medals in 1984 and 1985, Delaney was again at centre-back when Offaly beat Galway by 2–11 to 1–12 in the 1985 All-Ireland SHC final. He was also part of the All-Stars selection that year.

Delaney won a further two consecutive Leinster SHC medals in 1988 and 1989. He also earned selection to the Leinster team and won a Railway Cup medal in 1979, following a four-point win over Connacht. Delaney played his 116th and final game for Offaly in a 4–15 to 1–15 defeat by Antrim in the 1989 All-Ireland SHC semi-final.

== Management career ==
Delaney served as manager of Westneath's senior team from 1996 to 1998. He simultaneously became involved with the Castletown club and managed them to the Laois SHC title in 1997. Delaney had a brief stint in charge of the Laois senior hurling team between 2001 and 2002.

== Honours ==
=== Player ===
Kinnitty

- Offaly Senior Hurling Championship (5): 1978, 1979, 1983, 1984, 1985

Offaly

- All-Ireland Senior Hurling Championship (2): 1981, 1985
- Leinster Senior Hurling Championship (6): 1980, 1981, 1984, 1985, 1988, 1989

Leinster

- Railway Cup (1): 1979

Awards

- All-Stars (1): 1985

=== Management ===
Castletown

- Laois Senior Hurling Championship (1): 1997

Awards
Preceded by Joe Connolly	Texaco Hurler of the Year; 1981	Succeeded by Noel Skehan
Sporting positions
Preceded by Pat Fleury	Offaly senior hurling team captain 1986	Succeeded by Joachim Kelly
Preceded by Georgie Leahy	Westmeath senior hurling team manager 1996-1998	Succeeded by Michael Cosgrove
Preceded by Seán Cuddy	Laois senior hurling team manager 2001-2002	Succeeded by Paudie Butler
