= 1956 Offaly Senior Hurling Championship =

Annual hurling competition season

- Champions: Coolderry (20th title)
- Runners-up: Drumcullen

The 1956 Offaly Senior Hurling Championship was the 59th staging of the Offaly Senior Hurling Championship since its establishment by the Offaly County Board in 1896.

Tullamore entered the championship as the defending champions.

The final was played on 9 September 1956 at St Brendan's Park in Birr, between Coolderry and Drumcullen, in what was their first meeting in the final in two years. Coolderry won the match by 3–05 to 1–08 to claim their 20th championship title overall and a first championship title in three years.

== Results ==
=== Final ===
| 9 September 1956 Final | Coolderry | 3-05 - 1-08 | Drumcullen | St Brendan's Park |
