= 2026 Offaly Senior Hurling Championship =

Annual hurling competition season

- Dates: 11 July – 18 October 2026
- Teams: 10
- Sponsor: Molloy Environmental Systems
- Champions: Kilcormac–Killoughey (8th title); Charlie Mitchell (captain); Declan Laffan (manager)
- Runners-up: Ballinamere; Mark Troy (captain); Seán Treacy (manager)
- Relegated: Lusmagh

Tournament statistics
- Matches played: 26
- Goals scored: 62 (2.38 per match)
- Points scored: 1027 (39.5 per match)
- Top scorer(s): Brian Duignan (5–51)

The 2026 Offaly Senior Hurling Championship was the 129th staging of the Offaly Senior Hurling Championship since its establishment by the Offaly County Board in 1896. The draw for the group stage placings was made in February 2026. The championship ran from 11 July to 18 October 2026.

Kilcormac–Killoughey were the defending champions. Lusmagh's relegation saw a return to the second tier after just one year in the top flight.

The final was played on 18 October 2028 at Glenisk O'Connor Park in Tullamore, between Kilcormac–Killoughey and Ballinamere, in what was their second meeting in the final in three years. Kilcormac–Killoughey won the match by 0–19 to 0–17 to claim their eighth championship title overall and a fourth consecutive title.

Ballinamere's Brian Duignan was the championship's Top scorer with 5–51.

== Team changes ==
=== To championship ===
Promoted from the Offaly Senior B Hurling Championship

- Lusmagh

=== From championship ===
Relegated to the Offaly Senior B Hurling Championship

- Seir Kieran

== Group stage ==
=== Group 1 table ===
Semi-finalists Quarter-finalists Relegation playoff

Team	Matches				Score			Pts
Team	Pld	W	D	L	For	Against	Diff	Pts
Kilcormac–Killoughey	4	3	0	1	104	76	28	6
St Rynagh's	4	3	0	1	103	88	15	6
Birr	4	2	0	2	89	85	4	4
Coolderry	4	2	0	2	92	89	3	4
Kinnitty	4	0	0	4	62	112	-50	0

=== Group 1 results ===
12 July 2026 Round 1	St Rynagh's	3-18 - 1-20	Birr	St Rynagh's Park
	E Woods (1-7, 0-7 frees), E Houlihan, S Rigney (1-2 each), D Scully, A Molloy (0-2 each), J Flannery, B Conneely, S Quirke (0-1 each).	Report	A Watkins (0-10, 0-7 frees, 0-1 '65'), E Hayes (1-1), I Kerin (0-4), M Watkins (0-2, 0-1 free), D Tierney, C Mulrooney, E Nolan (0-1 each).

12 July 2026 Round 1	Kilcormac–Killoughey	2-17 - 4-14	Coolderry	Kilcormac GAA Grounds
	D Hand 0-8 (0-6f), C Spain 1-2, A Kavanagh 1-1, T Guinan 0-2, J Screeney 0-1, C Mahon 0-1, L Kavanagh 0-1, D Kilmartin 0-1.	Report	E Burke 1-9 (0-5f, 0-1 65), S Ryan 1-1, A Connolly 1-1, G McCormack 1-0, C Burke 0-1, E Parlon 0-1, E Ryan 0-1.

23 July 2026 Round 2	Kinnitty	0-13 - 0-26	Kilcormac–Killoughey	St Finian's Park
	J Dempsey (0-6, 0-5 frees), C Robinson (0-3), R Fay, D Flanagan, C Hardiman, N Standish (0-1 each).	Report	T Geraghty (0-8, 0-4 frees, 0-1 '65'), L Kavanagh (0-4), C Spain (0-4, 0-2 sideline cuts), J Screeney (0-3), C Mahon (0-2), A Kavanagh, C Slevin (free), B Kavanagh, E Grogan, L Kavanagh (0-1 each).

25 July 2026 Round 2	Coolderry	1-18 - 0-23	St Rynagh's	Coolderry GAA Grounds
	C Burke (1-5), E Burke (0-6, 0-4 frees), S Corcoran (0-5, 0-4 frees), S Ryan, D King (0-1 each).	Report	E Woods (0-15, 0-13 frees), J Flannery (0-3), E Houlihan, S Rigney (0-2 each), S Quirke (0-1).

7 August 2026 Round 3	Birr	1-23 - 0-15	Coolderry	St Mary’s Field
	A Watkins 1-7 (3f), E Cahill 0-7 (4f), C Mulrooney, M Watkins, I Kerin 0-2 each, B Miller, E Nolan, D Tierney 0-1 each.	Report	E Burke 0-7 (6f), S Corcoran (2f) and E Ryan 0-2 each, C Molloy, S Connolly, C Burke, G McCormack 0-1 each.

8 August 2026 Round 3	St Rynagh's	2-24 - 0-19	Kinnitty	St Brendan's Park
	E Woods 1-9 (0-7f, 0-1 65), A Molloy 1-2, D Scully 0-4, S Rigney 0-4, S Quirke 0-3, E Houlihan 0-1, P Camon 0-1.	Report	J Dempsey 0-6f, N Standish 0-4 (0-1f), C Robinson 0-3, A Carroll 0-2, P Delaney 0-1, A Kealey 0-1, B Coughlan 0-1, C Hardiman 0-1.

23 August 2026 Round 4	Birr	1-23 - 0-13	Kinnitty	St Brendan's Park
	A Watkins 1-10 (0-8f), D Tierney 0-4, M Watkins 0-3, B Harding 0-3, J Ryan 0-2, L Nolan 0-1.	Report	J Dempsey 0-3f, R Fay 0-3, O Kealey 0-3f, A Kealey 0-1, M Dooley 0-1, C Robinson 0-1, C Hardiman 0-1.

23 August 2026 Round 4	Kilcormac–Killoughey	0-25 - 2-17	St Rynagh's	St Brendan's Park
	D Hand 0-9 (6f), C Spain 0-5, C Kiely 0-3, C Slevin 0-2 (2f), D Kilmartin, J Screeney, T Guinan, L Kavanagh, A Kavanagh, P Geraghty 0-1 each.	Report	E Woods 0-6 (3f and 1 '65'), S Quirke 1-2, G Conneely 0-3, D Scully 1-0, A Molloy and L O'Connor 0-2 each, J O'Connor, J Flannery 0-1 each.

5 September 2026 Round 5	Coolderry	3-21 - 1-14	Kinnitty	Drumcullen Grounds
	E Burke 1-13 (0-7 Frees, 0-3 ’65’s), E Parlon 1-2, C Burke 1-1, E Ryan 0-2, A Hogan 0-1, G McCormack 0-1, S Corcoran 0-1.	Reeport	N Standish 0-5 (0-4 Frees), C Hardiman 0-3, J Dempsey 1-0, R Fay 0-2, D Flanagan 0-2, A Kealey 0-1, W Molloy 0-1.

5 September 2026 Round 5	Birr	0-14 - 2-24	Kilcormac–Killoughey	St Rynagh's Park
	E Cahill 0-9 (7f), D Tierney 0-2, P Watkins, I Kerin, L Nolan 0-1 each.	Report	D Hand 0-6 (4f and 1 '65'), C Spain 0-4, P Geraghty 1-1, T Geraghty and C Mahon 0-3 each, O Mahon 1-0, Lochlann Kavanagh and Leigh Kavanagh 0-2 each, C Slevin (f), C Kiely, D Kilmartin 0-1 each.

=== Group 2 table ===
Semi-finalists Quarter-finalists Relegation playoff

Team	Matches				Score			Pts
Team	Pld	W	D	L	For	Against	Diff	Pts
Ballinamere	4	4	0	0	109	83	26	8
Belmont	4	2	0	2	96	91	5	4
Shinrone	4	2	0	2	113	105	8	4
Tullamore	4	2	0	2	100	100	0	4
Lusmagh (R)	4	0	0	4	67	106	-39	0

=== Tie Break for places 2 to 4 ===
Team	W	D	L	For	Against	Diff	Pts
Belmont	1	0	1	50	48	2	2
Shinrone	1	0	1	54	54	0	2
Tullamore	1	0	1	52	54	-2	2

=== Group 2 results ===
11 July 2026 Round 1	Lusmagh	0-12 - 0-24	Ballinamere	Lusmagh Grounds
	L Bowe 0-4 (4f), D Healy and J Kelly 0-2 each, E Kelly (f), D Temple, P Kinsella, F O’Meara 0-1 each.	Report	B Duignan 0-10 (5f), A Maher 0-5, K McDermott and D Bourke 0-2 each, M Troy (f), C McDonald, S Bourke, D Magner, M O’Brien 0-1 each.

12 July 2026 Round 1	Tullamore	2-24 - 3-19	Shinrone	O'Brien Park
	S Dooley 1-14 (10f), M Fox and M Keogh 0-3 each, P Cleary 1-0 (own goal), L Egan, C Egan, J Houlihan, N Furlong 0-1 each.	Report	D Morkan 0-7 (7f), E Cleary 2-0 (2f), DJ McLoughlin 1-4, A Landy 0-2, D Doughan, K Sampson, J Sampson, C Cleary, P Cleary, S Cleary 0-1 each.

25 July 2026 Round 2	Belmont	1-22 - 1-17	Lusmagh	Moystown Grounds
	D Nally (0-7, 0-2 frees), M Egan (0-6, frees), A Nugent (1-0), P Clancy, O Kelly (0-2 each), C Grennan, R Flynn, D Kelly, B Carroll, L Fox (0-1 each).	Report	P Kinsella (1-13, 0-10 frees, 0-1 sideline cut, 0-1 '65'), G Lynch, F O'Meara (0-2 each).

26 July 2026 Round 2	Ballinamere	1-22 - 0-21	Tullamore	Ballinamere Grounds
	B Duignan (1-6, 0-3 frees, 0-1 '65'), J Maher (0-7), D Ravenhill (0-3, 0-1 penalty), D Bourke (0-2), C Kinnarney, R Ravenhill, S Bourke, A Maher (0-1 each).		S Dooley (0-14, 0-10 frees, 0-3 '65s), M Fox, C Egan (0-3 each), M Keogh (0-1).

8 August 2026 Round 3	Tullamore	3-13 - 4-14	Belmont	Kilcormac Grounds
	S Dooley 1-7 (4f), K Wynne and N Furlong 1-0 each, M Feeney 0-2, N Houlihan, G Crowe, M Fox, D Egan 0-1 each.	Report	D Nally 1-5 (1f and 1 '65'), P Clancy 1-3, B Carroll 1-1, A Nugent 1-0, O Kelly 0-2, P Taaffe, R Flynn, M Egan (1 '65') 0-1 each.

8 August 2026 Round 3	Shinrone	2-23 - 3-28	Ballinamere	St Brendan's Park
	A Landy 1-7 (6f), P Cleary 1-5, J Sampson 0-3, DJ McLoughlin, C Doughan and J O'Sullivan 0-2 each, D Maher and D Landy 0-1 each.	Report	B Duignan 3-8 (5f), J Maher 0-8, S Bourke, D Ravenhill and A Maher 0-3 each, M O'Brien 0-2, J Fogarty 0-1.

22 August 2026 Round 4	Lusmagh	0-21 - 2-21	Tullamore	St Rynagh's Park
	P Kinsella 0-9 (4f and 1 sideline), E Quinlan 0-4, Eimhin Kelly 0-3, A Kelly 0-2, Eibheann Kelly, D Temple, G Lynch 0-1 each.	Report	S Dooley 1-8 (7f), G Crowe 1-3, M Keogh, A Leavy, N Furlong, D Egan 0-2 each, M Fox, C Egan, 0-1 each.

23 August 2026 Round 4	Shinrone	1-23 - 1-21	Belmont	St Brendan's Park
	A Landy 0-9 (5f), D Morkan 0-6, E Cleary 1-0 (penalty), A Cleary and J O'Sullivan 0-2 each, K Sampson, J Sampson, C Cleary, S Cleary 0-1 each.	Report	D Nally 0-11 (7f and 1 '65'), P Clancy 1-5, C Grennan, J Clancy, R Flynn (f), S Nally and O Kelly 0-1 each.

6 September 2026 Round 5	Shinrone	3-21 - 0-14	Lusmagh	St Brendan's Park
	S Cleary 2-1, A Cleary 1-3, A Landy 0-4 (0-1 Free, 0-1 ’65), K Sampson 0-3, J O’Sullivan 0-3, L Watkins 0-2, G Maher 0-1, D Doughan 0-1, E Cleary 0-1 (Free), D Landy 0-1, JP Cleary 0-1.	Report	P Kinsella 0-8 (0-7 Frees), A Kelly 0-3, Eimhin Kelly 0-1, Eibheann Kelly 0-1, E Quinlan 0-1.

6 September 2026 Round 5	Ballinamere	0-23 - 1-18	Belmont	St Rynagh's Park
	B Duignan 0-11 (10f), D Bourke 0-4, J Maher 0-3, A Maher 0-2, D Ravenhill (f), S Bourke and J Murphy 0-1 each.	Report	D Nally 1-10 (8f), D Kelly 0-3, C Egan 0-2, L Fox, B Carroll and R McEvoy 0-1 each.

== Relegation stage ==
=== Relegation final ===
20 September 2026 Playoff	Kinnitty	0-18 - 0-12	Lusmagh	St Brendan's Park
	C Robinson 0-5, N Standish 0-4 (0-1f), A Kealey 0-4, R Fay 0-2, D Flanagan 0-1, A Carroll 0-1, C Hardiman 0-1	Report	P Kinsella 0-8 (0-6f, 0-1 65’), E Kelly, D Healy, G Lynch, A Kelly 0-1 each.

== Knockout stage ==
=== Quarter-finals ===
19 September 2026 Quarter-final	St Rynagh's	1-24 - 0-25	Shinrone	St Brendan's Park
	E Woods 0-6 (3f), S Rigney 0-5, D Scully 0-4, G Conneely (3f) and L O'Connor 0-3 each, S Quirke 1-0, A Molloy, E Houlihan and R Hughes 0-1 each.	Report	D Morkan 0-7 (6f), S Cleary, A Cleary 0-3 each, E Cleary (2f), L Watkins, J O'Sullivan and A Landy 0-2 each, D Doughan, K Sampson, J Sampson, JP Cleary 0-1 each.

20 September 2026 Quarter-final	Birr	0-18 - 0-20	Belmont	O'Connor Park
	E Cahill 0-13 (11f and one sideline), B Murphy 0-2, A Watkins, L Nolan and E Nolan 0-1 each.	Report	D Nally 0-10 (6f), P Clancy 0-3, R Flynn 0-2, J Clancy, D Kelly, C Egan, O Kelly and C Grennan 0-1 each.

=== Semi-finals ===
3 October 2026 Semi-final	Kilcormac–Killoughey	1-34 - 2-23 (aet)	St Rynagh's	O'Connor Park
	A Screeney 0-16 (10f), D Hand 1-3, T Geraghty 0-3, C Slevin (2f), C Mahon, B Guinan 0-2 each, J Screeney, J Majon, L Kavanagh, P Geraghty, A Kavanagh 0-1 each.	Report	E Woods 1-11 (1-9f), D Scully 1-1, A Molloy 0-2, S Rigney (sideline), P Camon, G Conneely (f), E Houlihan, L O'Connor, C Daly, P Quirke, D Healy, A Treacy 0-1 each.

4 October 2026 Semi-final	Ballinamere	4-18 - 3-19	Belmont	St Brendan's Park
	B Duignan 1-8 (4f, 2 '65s'), D Bourke 1-4, M O'Brien 1-1, A Maher 1-0, S Bourke 0-2, J Maher, J Murphy and C McDonald 0-1 each.	Report	D Nally 0-10 (6f), O Kelly 1-2, D Kelly and P Clancy 1-1 each, P Taaffe 0-3, R Flynn and A Egan (f) 0-1 each.

=== Final ===
18 October 2026 Final	Kilcormac–Killoughey	0-19 - 0-17	Ballinamere	O'Connor Park
	A Screeney 0-8 (7 frees), T Guinan, D Kilmartin, C Mahon, P Geraghty 0-2 each, C Slevin (1 free), D Hand, L Kavanagh 0-1 each	Report	B Duignan 0-8 (7 frees), D Ravenhill 0-3 (1 free), M O'Brien, A Maher 0-2 each, S Bourke, J Maher 0-1 each

== Championship statistics ==
=== Top scorers ===
Rank	Player	Club	Tally	Total	Matches	Average
1	Brian Duignan	Ballinamere	5-51	66	6	11.00
2	Eoin Woods	St Rynagh's	3-54	63	6	10.50
3	David Nally	Belmont	2-53	59	6	9.83
4	Shane Dooley	Tullamore	3-43	52	4	13.00
5	Paul Kinsella	Lusmagh	1-39	42	5	8.40
6	Eoin Burke	Coolderry	2-35	41	4	10.25
7	Ailbe Watkins	Birr	2-28	34	5	6.80
8	Daniel Hand	Kilcormac–Killoughey	1-27	30	5	6.00
9	Eoghan Cahill	Birr	0-29	29	3	9.66
10	Adam Landy	Shinrone	1-24	27	5	5.20
