= Mark Corrigan (hurler) =

Irish hurler

Personal information
- Native name: Marc Ó Corragáin (Irish)
- Born: 1960 (age 65–66) Kinnitty, County Offaly, Ireland
- Occupation: Carpenter
- Height: 5 ft 9 in (175 cm)

Sport
- Sport: Hurling
- Position: Left wing-forward
Club
- Years: Club
- Kinnitty
Club titles
- Offaly titles: 5
Inter-county
Years	County	Apps (scores)
1980–1991	Offaly	36 (14–107)
Inter-county titles
- Leinster titles: 7
- All-Irelands: 2
- NHL: 1
- All Stars: 1

Mark Corrigan (born 1960) is an Irish former hurler. At club level, he played for Kinnitty and at inter-county level with the Offaly senior hurling team.

== Career ==
At club level, Corrigan first played hurling at juvenile and underage levels with the Kinnitty club, before progressing to adult level. He won consecutive Offaly SHC medals in 1978 and 1979, following respective defeats of St Rynagh's and Coolderry. Corrigan later won three consecutive Offaly SHC medals between 1983 and 1985.

At inter-county level, Corrigan first played for Offaly during a two-year tenure with the minor team. He later spent four consecutive years with the under-21 team and won a Leinster U21HC medal in 1978. Corrigan made his senior team debut in a National Hurling League game against Tipperary in November 1979.

Corrigan was part of the Offaly team that beat Kilkenny to win their inaugural Leinster SHC title in 1980. He claimed a second consecutive Leinster SHC title the following year, before lining out at wing-back in Offaly's 2–12 to 0–15 win over Galway in the 1981 All-Ireland SHC final. He ended the season with an All-Star. Corrigan won another consective set of Leinster SHC medals in 1984 and 1985. He won a second All-Ireland SHC medal in 1985 following Offaly's 2–11 to 1–12 win over Galway.

Corrigan won a further three consecutive Leinster SHC medals between 1988 and 1990. He was the top scorer in Leinster's victory over Connacht in the 1988 Railway Cup final. Corrigan played his 97th and final game for Offaly in their 2–06 to 0–10 win over Wexford to claim the National Hurling League title in May 1991.

== Honours ==
Kinnitty

- Offaly Senior Hurling Championship (5): 1978, 1979, 1983, 1984, 1985

Offaly

- All-Ireland Senior Hurling Championship (2): 1981, 1985
- Leinster Senior Hurling Championship (7): 1980, 1981, 1984, 1985, 1988, 1989, 1990
- Leinster Under-21 Hurling Championship (1): 1978

Leinster

- Railway Cup (1): 1988

Awards

- All-Stars (2): 1981, 1985
