= Pat Carroll (hurler) =

Irish hurler (1956–1986)

Pat Caroll
Personal information
- Native name: Pádraig Ó Cearbhall (Irish)
- Born: 11 February 1956 Newhall, County Offaly, Ireland
- Died: 16 March 1986 (aged 30) Rathgar, Dublin, Ireland
- Occupation: Farmer
- Height: 5 ft 8 in (173 cm)

Sport
- Sport: Hurling
- Position: Forward
Club
- Years: Club
- Coolderry
Club titles
- Offaly titles: 2
Inter-county
Years	County	Apps (scores)
1977-1985	Offaly	25 (1-42)
Inter-county titles
- Leinster titles: 4
- All-Irelands: 2
- NHL: 0
- All Stars: 2

Patrick Carroll (11 February 1956 – 16 March 1986) was an Irish hurler. At club level, he played with Coolderry and at inter-county level with the Offaly senior hurling team.

== Career ==
Carroll attended the Presentation College in Birr and played in all grades of hurling during his time there. At club level, he first played for Coolderry at juvenile and underage levels before progressing to the club's senior team. Carroll won offaly SHC medals after defeats of Kinnitty in 1977 and 1980, when he captained the team and claimed the man of the match award.

At inter-county level, Carroll first played for Offaly during a two-year tenure with the minor team in 1973 and 1974. He later spent four consecutive years with the under-21 team but ended his underage career without silverware. Carroll made his senior team debut in a National Hurling League game against Limerick in November 1975.

Carroll was part of the Offaly team that beat Kilkenny to win their inaugural Leinster SHC title in 1980. He claimed a second consecutive Leinster SHC title the following year, before lining out at corner-forward in Offaly's 2–12 to 0–15 win over Galway in the 1981 All-Ireland SHC final. Carroll ended the season by winning his second consective All-Star.

Carroll won another consective set of Leinster SHC medals in 1984 and 1985. He played his last game for Offaly in their All-Ireland SHC semi-final win over Antrim in August 1985. Illness ruled Carroll out of Offaly's 2–11 to 1–12 win over Galway in the 1985 All-Ireland SHC final.

Performances at inter-county level resulted in Carroll being selected for the Leinster inter-provincial team. He won a Railway Cup medal in 1979, following Leinster's 1–13 to 1–09 win over Connacht.

== Personal life and death ==
His father, Jack Carroll, lined out in goal for Offaly between 1946 and 1953. Carroll's grandfather, "Red" Jack Teehan, was the first Offaly player to be selected for the Leinster team in the Railway Cup. His son, Brian Carroll, also played for Offaly and is one of their all-time top championship scorers.

Carroll died from a brain tumour on 16 March 1986, at the age of 30.

== Honours ==
Coolderry

- Offaly Senior Hurling Championship (2): 1977, 1980 (c)

Offaly

- All-Ireland Senior Hurling Championship (2): 1981, 1985
- Leinster Senior Hurling Championship (4): 1980, 1981, 1984, 1985

Leinster

- Railway Cup (1): 1979

Sporting positions
Preceded by Pádraig Horan	Offaly senior hurling team captain 1982-1983	Succeeded by Pat Fleury
