= Danny Owens =

Irish hurler (born 1959)

Personal information
- Native name: Donncha Mac Eoin (Irish)
- Born: 1959 (age 66–67) Killoughey, County Offaly, Ireland
- Occupations: Electronics technician, politician
- Height: 5 ft 10 in (178 cm)

Sport
- Sport: Hurling
- Position: Midfield
Clubs
- Years: Club
- 1976–1986 1986–1998: Killoughey; Kilcormac–Killoughey
Club titles
- Offaly titles: 0
Inter-county*
Years	County	Apps (scores)
1980–1992	Offaly	25 (3–22)
Inter-county titles
- Leinster titles: 5
- All-Irelands: 2
- NHL: 1
- All Stars: 0
- *Inter County team apps and scores correct as of 19:50, 28 June 2014.

Daniel Owens (born 1959) is an Irish hurling manager and former player. At club level he played with Kilcormac–Killoughey and at inter-county level with the Offaly senior hurling team. Owens is also a former elected representative with Offaly County Council.

== Playing career ==
Owens had his first Gaelic games success as a student at the Carmelite College in Moate. During his time there, he was part of the college's senior football team and won three successive Leinster Colleges SFC medals. Owens also won a Hogan Cup medal after a defeat of St Jarlath's College in 1976.

At club level, Owens began his career at juvenile and underage levels with Na Piarsaigh before progressing to adult level with Killoughey. He won Offaly IHC title in 1980 and 1984. Owens ended his club career with the newly-amalgamated Kilcormac–Killoughey club.

Owens first appeared on the inter-county scene for Offaly as a dual player at minor level. He was part of the minor team that lost the Leinster MFC final to Dublin in 1976. He progressed to under-21 level, again as a dual player, and won Leinster U21HC and Leinster U21FC honours.

Owens continued his dual status at senior level. He made some appearances for the Offaly senior football team during the 1978–79 National Football League, before switching codes. Owens was a panel member and came on as a substitute for Offaly's inaugural All-Ireland SHC success in 1981. He claimed a second All-Ireland SHC winners' medal from midfield in 1985. Owens' other inter-county honours include five Leinster SHC medals and a National Hurling League medal as team captain in 1991.

== Managerial career ==
Owens first became involved in inter-county management when he was ratified as Offaly's under-21 team manager in November 1997. He took charge of the Offaly minor hurling team in October 2001. At club level, Owens took charge of the Kilcormac–Killoughey club and guided them to three successive Offaly SHC titles between 2012 and 2014. The club also claimed the Leinster Club SHC title in 2012, before losing the 2013 All-Ireland Club SHC final to St Thomas's.

After stepping down from this role, Owens was appointed Westmeath's minor hurling team manager in December 2015. After one season with Westmeath, he returned to club activity as Tullamore manager, before steering Camross to the Laois SHC title in 2018. Owens returned to as manager of his home club of Kilcormac–Killoughey in 2019.

== Political career ==
Owens was elected to Offaly County Council as a Fianna Fáil councillor for the Tullamore area at the 2004 local elections. He was re-elected at three subsequent elections before announcing his retirement from politics in December 2023, when he also confirmed that he had been diagnosed with Parkinson's disease.

== Honours ==
=== Player ===
Carmelite College

- Hogan Cup: 1976
- Leinster Colleges Senior Football Championship: 1976, 1977, 1978

Killoughey

- Offaly Intermediate Hurling Championship: 1980, 1984

Offaly

- All-Ireland Senior Hurling Championship: 1981, 1985
- Leinster Senior Hurling Championship: 1981, 1985, 1988, 1989, 1990
- National Hurling League: 1990-91 (c)
- Leinster Under-21 Football Championship: 1979
- Leinster Under-21 Hurling Championship: 1978

=== Manager ===
Kilcormac–Killoughey

- Leinster Senior Club Hurling Championship (1): 2012
- Offaly Senior Club Hurling Championship (2): 2012, 2013, 2014

Camross

- Laois Senior Hurling Championship: 2018
