= 1962 Offaly Senior Hurling Championship =

Annual hurling competition season

- Dates: 13 May – 16 September 1962
- Teams: 9
- Champions: Coolderry (22nd title); Brendan Loughnane (captain)
- Runners-up: Drumcullen

Tournament statistics
- Matches played: 7
- Goals scored: 48 (6.86 per match)
- Points scored: 81 (11.57 per match)

The 1962 Offaly Senior Hurling Championship was the 65th staging of the Offaly Senior Hurling Championship since its establishment by the Offaly County Board in 1896. The championship ran from 13 May to 16 September 1962.

Coolderry entered the championship as the defending champions.

The final was played on 16 September 1962 at St Brendan's Park in Birr, between Coolderry and Drumcullen, in what was their second consecutive meeting in the final. Coolderry won the match by 2–12 to 1–05 to claim their 22nd championship title overall and a second consecutive title.

== Results ==
=== First round ===
10 June 1962 First round	Tullamore	3-05 - 2-04	Birr	O'Connor Park

17 June 1962 First round	Coolderry	4-04 - 3-03	Shinrone	St Brendan's Park

17 June 1962 First round	Ballinamere	w/o - scr.	St Rynagh's	St Cormac's Grounds

24 June 1962 First round	Drumcullen	5-09 - 2-03	Kilcormac	St Cormac's Park

- Ballyskenagh received a bye in this round.

=== Second round ===
15 July 1962 Second round	Ballyskenagh	7-04 - 3-09	Ballinamere	St Cormac's Grounds

=== Semi-finals ===
29 July 1962 Semi-final	Coolderry	6-06 - 2-06	Tullamore	St Brendan's Park

29 July 1962 Semi-final	Drumcullen	7-08 - 1-03	Ballyskenagh	St Brendan's Park

=== Final ===
16 September 1962 Final	Coolderry	2-12 - 1-05	Drumcullen	St Brendan's Park
