= 1904 Offaly Senior Hurling Championship =

Annual hurling competition season

- Champions: Coolderry (4th title)
- Runners-up: Tullamore

The 1904 Offaly Senior Hurling Championship was the ninth staging of the Offaly Senior Hurling Championship since its establishment by the Offaly County Board in 1896.

Coolderry entered the championship as the defending champions.

The final was played between Coolderry and Tullamore, in what was their first ever meeting in the final. Coolderry won the match to claim their fourth championship title overall and a second championship title in succession.
