= 1963 Offaly Senior Hurling Championship =

Annual hurling competition season

- Champions: Coolderry (23rd title); Brendan Loughnane (captain)
- Runners-up: Drumcullen

The 1963 Offaly Senior Hurling Championship was the 66th staging of the Offaly Senior Hurling Championship since its establishment by the Offaly County Board in 1896.

Coolderry entered the championship as the defending champions.

The final was played on 8 September 1963 at St Brendan's Park in Birr, between Coolderry and Drumcullen, in what was their third consecutive meeting in the final. Coolderyr won the match by 4–07 to 3–04 to claim their 23rd championship title overall and a third consecutive title.

== Results ==
=== Final ===
8 September 1963 Final	Coolderry	4-07 - 3-04	Drumcullen	St Brendan's Park
