= 1949 Offaly Senior Hurling Championship =

Annual hurling competition season

- Champions: Coolderry (18th title)
- Runners-up: Drumcullen

The 1949 Offaly Senior Hurling Championship was the 52nd staging of the Offaly Senior Hurling Championship since its establishment by the Offaly County Board in 1896.

Drumcullen entered the championship as the defending champions.

The final was played on 9 October 1949 at St Brendan's Park in Birr, between Coolderry and Drumcullen, in what was their third meeting in the final overall. Coolderry won the match by 9–09 to 3–09 to claim their 18th championship title overall and a first championship title in two years.

== Results ==
=== Final ===
| 9 October 1949 Final | Coolderry | 9-09 - 3-09 | Drumcullen | St Brendan's Park |
