= 1953 Offaly Senior Hurling Championship =

Annual hurling competition season

- Champions: Coolderry (19th title); J. Connors (captain)
- Runners-up: Rahan; T. Connolly (captain)

The 1953 Offaly Senior Hurling Championship was the 56th staging of the Offaly Senior Hurling Championship since its establishment by the Offaly County Board in 1896.

Drumcullen entered the championship as the defending champions, however, they were beaten by Rahan in the semi-finals.

The final was played on 4 October 1953 at O'Connor Park in Tullamore, between Coolderry and Rahan, in what was their second meeting in the final overall. Coolderry won the match by 4–04 to 1–06 to claim their 19th championship title overall and a first championship title in four years.

== Results ==
=== Semi-finals ===
2 August 1953 Semi-final	Coolderry	3-08 - 3-04	Shannon Rangers	St Brendan's Park

9 August 1953 Semi-final	Rahan	4-03 - 2-06	Drumcullen	O'Connor Park

=== Final ===
4 October 1953 Final	Coolderry	4-04 - 1-06	Rahan	O'Connor Park
