= Pat Fleury =

Irish hurler

Personal information
- Native name: Pádraig Ó Fíobhra (Irish)
- Born: 18 May 1956 (age 70) Drumcullen, County Offaly, Ireland
- Occupation: Secondary school teacher
- Height: 6 ft 0 in (183 cm)

Sport
- Sport: Hurling
- Position: Left corner-back
Club
- Years: Club
- Drumcullen
Club titles
- Offaly titles: 0
Inter-county*
Years	County	Apps (scores)
1975–1986	Offaly	31 (0-00)
Inter-county titles
- Leinster titles: 4
- All-Irelands: 2
- NHL: 0
- All Stars: 2
- *Inter County team apps and scores correct as of 21:13, 1 April 2015.

Patrick "Pat" Fleury (born 18 May 1956) is an Irish former hurler who played as a right corner-back for the Offaly senior hurling team.

Born in Drumcullen, County Offaly, Fleury first played competitive hurling during his schooling at Presentation Brothers College in Birr. He arrived on the inter-county scene when he first linked up with the Offaly minor team before later joining the under-21 side. He made his senior debut during the 1975 championship. Fleury later became a regular member of the starting fifteen and won two All-Ireland medals and four Leinster medals. The All-Ireland-winning captain of 1985, Fleury was an All-Ireland runner-up on two occasions.

As a member of the Leinster inter-provincial team on a number of occasions, Fleury ended his career without a Railway Cup medal. At club level he was a one-time championship medallist in the junior grade with Drumcullen

Throughout his career Fleury made 31 championship appearances. He retired from inter-county hurling following the conclusion of the 1986 championship.

In retirement from playing Fleury became involved in team management and punditry. He managed the Offaly senior hurling team for one season while he is a regular contributor as a hurling analyst and co-commentator on GAA Beo.

== Playing career ==
=== Colleges ===
During his schooling at the Presentation College in Birr, Fleury established himself as a key member of the senior hurling team. In 1973 he won an All-Ireland colleges medal in the "B" grade.

=== University ===
During his studies at University College Galway, Fleury was an automatic inclusion on the college hurling team. In 1977 he was captain as UCG faced Maynooth College in the final of the inter-varsities championship. A narrow 1–14 to 1–12 victory gave Fleury a Fitzgibbon Cup medal.

=== Club ===
Fleury played his club hurling with Drumcullen. In 1974 he was just out of the minor grade when he won a championship medal in the junior grade.

=== Inter-county ===
Fleury first came to prominence on the inter-county scene for Offaly at both minor and under-21 levels, however, he had little success in either of these grades.

After making some appearances in the pre-season Walsh Cup, Fleury made his senior championship debut in a 6–6 to 4–12 Leinster quarter-final draw with Kildare. He was a regular starter in the league over the next few seasons, however, it wasn't until 1977 that he established himself as a member of the championship team.

In 1980 Offaly emerged from the doldrums to qualify for only their second provincial decider in fifty years. Reigning All-Ireland champions Kilkenny provided the opposition, however, a remarkable 3–17 to 5–10 victory gave Fleury his first Leinster medal. Offaly's dream season came to an end with a defeat by eventual champions Galway in the All-Ireland semi-final.

Offaly proved that their success was more than a flash in the pan by reaching the provincial final again in 1981. Fleury collected his second Leinster medal that year as Offaly defeated Wexford by 3–12 to 2–13. This win allowed Offaly to advance to a very first All-Ireland final with reigning champions Galway. After fourteen minutes Pat Carroll scored the opening goal of the game for Offaly, however, neither side built up a strong lead. Straight after the interval goalkeeper Damien Martin was doing great work when he batted out an almost certain Galway goal. With just over twenty minutes left in the game Galway led by six points, however, the team failed to score for the rest of the match. Offaly, on the other hand, ate into this lead. Johnny Flaherty's controversial hand-passed goal with three minutes was the deciding score of the game. At the full-time whistle Offaly were the winners by 2–12 to 0–15. It was a first All-Ireland medal for Fleury.

After suffering back-to-back Leinster final defeats to Kilkenny, Offaly triumphed once again in 1984. A 1–15 to 2–11 defeat of Wexford gave Fleury a third Leinster medal. Offaly subsequently advanced to the centenary All-Ireland final at Semple Stadium in Thurles. On the day, however, Cork were far too strong for Fleury's team. Although far from being a classic game Offaly were defeated by 3–16 to 1–12.

Offaly retained their Leinster title in 1985 with Fleury adding a fourth provincial memento to this collection following a 5–15 to 0–17 trouncing of Laois. Galway provided the opposition in the subsequent All-Ireland final and another tense game ensued. Once again it was Offaly's goal-scoring ability that proved crucial. Pat Cleary scored the first of the day after twenty-five minutes of play and got his second less than half a minute after the restart. Joe Dooley had a goal disallowed halfway through the second-half while a long Joe Cooney effort, which seemed to cross the goal line, was not given. P.J. Molloy was Galway's goal scorer, however, the day belonged to Offaly. A 2–11 to 1–12 victory gave Fleury his second All-Ireland medal while he also had the honour of collecting the Liam MacCarthy Cup as captain.

In 1986 Offaly lined out in an impressive seventh Leinster decider in-a-row. Kilkenny were the opponents on that occasion, however, Offaly were now a team in decline. A 4–10 to 1–11 score line gave victory to "the Cats" and knocked Offaly out of the championship. Fleury retired from inter-county hurling following this defeat.

=== Inter-provincial ===
Fleury also lined out with Leinster in the inter-provincial hurling competition. He first came to prominence with his province in 1981 as Leinster took on Munster in the Railway Cup final. A ten-point defeat was Fleury's lot on that occasion. Fleury was picked on the Leinster team again in 1982. Connacht provided the opposition in the final that year and, once again, Fleury ended up on the losing side. Two years later in 1984 he was the left corner-back on the Leinster team that faced Munster in the final again. Unfortunately, Fleury's side faced a 1–18 to 2–9 defeat once again.

== Managerial career ==
=== University College Galway ===
Fleury first became involved in coaching during his university days in University College Galway. During his second year in the college he coached the first year team to both league and championship successes.

=== CBS Sexton Street ===
As a teacher at CBS Sexton Street, Fleury also took charge of various school teams. He guided the school to the Harty Cup final in 1984; however, the team faced a 4–9 to 1–7 defeat by St. Finbarr's of Cork.

Success was slow in coming, however, Sexton Street reached the Harty decider again in 1993. A 5–5 to 1–12 defeat of St. Flannan's College secured the title for the first time since 1967 and for the tenth time in all.

=== Offaly ===
Fleury was appointed manager of the Offaly senior team on 6 October 1999. His tenure was dogged with controversy and misfortune, beginning with a threat from the Birr club players to boycott the county team after being thrown out of the club championship. A row over sponsorship erupted soon afterwards when a locally based mobile telephone company agreed a deal with the Offaly team. On the week of their championship match against Wexford the local newspapers printed photographs of the Offaly players endorsing the new, but unofficial, sponsor. The county board were forced to issue a prompt statement underlining their unqualified commitment to Carroll Meats who were the long-time sponsors of Offaly. All of this was a distraction and Offaly faced a 2–21 to 1–13 defeat by Kilkenny in the Leinster decider. In the meantime, Fleury faced further internal strife with a number of players walking away after a lack of game time. In spite of all of this, Offaly qualified for the All-Ireland decider on 10 September 2000. As a result of the "back door system", Kilkenny were the opponents once again. D.J. Carey capitalised on an Offaly mistake after just six minutes to start a goal-fest for "the Cats!. Carey scored 2–4 in all, sharing his second goal with Shefflin who also scored a goal in the second-half. At the full-time whistle Kilkenny were the champions by 5–15 to 1–14. Fleury subsequently resigned as manager.

== Personal life ==
Born in Drumcullen, County Offaly, Fleury was educated at the local national school before later completing his Leaving Certificate at the Presentation College in Birr. He subsequently completed a Bachelor of Arts at University College Galway, before qualifying as a secondary school teacher.

== Quotes ==
- "What happened us last year has finally been buried and thanks be to God." – Fleury's speech after accepting the Liam MacCarthy Cup in 1985.

Sporting positions
Preceded by Pat Carroll	Offaly Senior Hurling Captain; 1984–1985	Succeeded by Pat Delaney
Preceded by Michael Bond	Offaly Senior Hurling Manager; 1999–2000	Succeeded by Michael Bond
Achievements
Preceded by John Fenton (Cork)	All-Ireland Senior Hurling Final winning captain 1985	Succeeded by Tom Cashman (Cork)
