= 1983 Offaly Senior Hurling Championship =

Annual hurling competition season

- Champions: Kinnitty (7th title); Pat Delaney (captain)
- Runners-up: St Rynagh's; Aidan Fogarty (captain)

The 1983 Offaly Senior Hurling Championship was the 86th staging of the Offaly Senior Hurling Championship since its establishment by the Offaly County Board in 1896.

St Rynagh's entered the championship as the defending champions.

The final was played on 25 September 1983 at St Brendan's Park in Birr, between Kinnitty and St Rynagh's, in what was their seventh meeting in the final overall and a first meeting in two years. Kinnitty won the match by 0–20 to 2–06 to claim their seventh championship title overall and a first title in four years.

== Results ==
=== Semi-finals ===
| 28 August 1983 Semi-final | St Rynagh's | 3-15 - 2-08 | Lusmagh | St Brendan's Park |
| | H Dolan 1-4, N Molloy 1-2, D Fogarty 1-2, P Horan 0-5, T Conneely 0-1, S White 0-1. | | S Lynch 1-3, Joachim Kelly 1-0, B Troy 0-1, F Kelly 0-1, B Bermingham 0-1, PJ Troy 0-1, Jim Kelly 0-1. |

| 11 September 1983 Semi-final | Kinnitty | 1-09 - 2-06 | Coolderry | St Brendan's Park |
| | P Corrigan 1-3, P Delaney 0-3, T Carroll 0-1, C Spain 0-1. | | P Carroll 0-4, S Kennedy 1-0, J Teehan 1-0, P Teehan 0-1, M Lyons 0-1. |

| 18 September 1983 Semi-final replay | Kinnitty | 0-15 - 1-08 | Coolderry | St Brendan's Park |
| | P Corrigan 0-6, J Flaherty 0-3, B Kennedy 0-2, C Spain 0-2, S Donoghue 0-1, G Coughlan 0-1. | | P Carroll 1-4, PJ Burke 0-1, P Moloughney 0-1, M King 0-1, M Lyons 0-1. |

=== Final ===
| 25 September 1983 Final | Kinnitty | 0-20 - 2-06 | St Rynagh's | St Brendan's Park |
| | P Corrigan 0-6, M Corrigan 0-6, C Spain 0-3, S Donoghue 0-1, G Coughlan 0-1, B Kennedy 0-1, J Flaherty 0-1, J Molloy 0-1. | | D Fogarty 1-0, H Dolan 1-0, N Molloy 0-2, P Horan 0-2, T Conneely 0-1, J Horan 0-1. |
