= 1899 Offaly Senior Hurling Championship =

Annual hurling competition season

- Champions: Coolderry (1st title)
- Runners-up: Kinnitty

The 1899 Offaly Senior Hurling Championship was the fourth staging of the Offaly Senior Hurling Championship since its establishment by the Offaly County Board in 1896.

Fortal entered the championship as the defending champions.

The final was played on 26 November 1899 at the Sharavogue Grounds, between Coolderry and Kinnitty, in what was their first ever meeting in the final. Coolderry won the match by 2–02 to 1–04 to claim their first ever championship title.

== Results ==
=== Final ===
26 November 1899 Final	Coolderry	2-02 - 1-04	Kinnitty	Sharavogue Grounds
