= 1961 Offaly Senior Hurling Championship =

Annual hurling competition season

- Champions: Coolderry (21st title); Brendan Loughnane (captain)
- Runners-up: Drumcullen

The 1961 Offaly Senior Hurling Championship was the 64th staging of the Offaly Senior Hurling Championship since its establishment by the Offaly County Board in 1896.

Drumcullen entered the championship as the defending champions.

The final was scheduled to be played on 22 October at St Brendan's Park in Birr, between Coolderry and Drumcullen, but was not played as the latter team was unable to field a team because of several injuries. Coolderry subsequently claimed the game and the title without a final being played.

== Results ==
=== Semi-finals ===
10 September 1961 Semi-final	Coolderry	4-06 - 4-06	Shinrone	St Brendan's Park

10 September 1961 Semi-final	Drumcullen	5-12 - 2-03	Kilcormac	St Brendan's Park

1 October 1961 Semi-final replay	Coolderry	4-16 - 5-09	Shinrone	St Brendan's Park

=== Final ===
22 October 1961 Final	Coolderry	w/o - scr.	Drumcullen	St Brendan's Park
