= 1903 Offaly Senior Hurling Championship =

Annual hurling competition season

- Champions: Coolderry (3rd title)
- Runners-up: Kilcormac

The 1903 Offaly Senior Hurling Championship was the eighth staging of the Offaly Senior Hurling Championship since its establishment by the Offaly County Board in 1896.

Cadamstown entered the championship as the defending champions.

The final was played between Coolderry and Kilcormac, in what was their first ever meeting in the final. Coolderry won the match to claim their third championship title overall and a first championship title in two years.
