= 1947 Offaly Senior Hurling Championship =

Annual hurling competition season

- Champions: Coolderry (17th title)
- Runners-up: Birr

The 1947 Offaly Senior Hurling Championship was the 50th staging of the Offaly Senior Hurling Championship since its establishment by the Offaly County Board in 1896.

Birr entered the championship as the defending champions.

The final was played on 21 September 1947 at O'Connor Park in Tullamore, between Coolderry and Birr, in what was their third meeting in the final overall. Coolderry won the match by 4–06 to 2–03 to claim their 17th championship title overall and a first championship title in two years.

== Results ==
=== Final ===
21 September 1947 Final	Coolderry	4-06 - 2-03	Birr	O'Connor Park
