= Liam Carroll (hurler) =

Irish hurler

Personal information
- Native name: Liam Ó Cearúil (Irish)
- Born: Kinnitty, County Offaly, Ireland

Sport
- Sport: Hurling
- Position: Right corner-back
Club
- Years: Club
- Kinnitty
Club titles
- Offaly titles: 0
Inter-county*
Years	County	Apps (scores)
1984-1986	Offaly	5 (0-00)
Inter-county titles
- Leinster titles: 1
- All-Irelands: 0
- NHL: 0
- All Stars: 0
- *Inter County team apps and scores correct as of 15:19, 29 June 2014.

Liam Carroll is an Irish retired hurler who played as a midfielder for the Offaly senior team.

Born in Kinnitty, County Offaly, Carroll first played competitive hurling in his youth. He made his senior debut with Offaly during the 1984 championship and immediately became a regular member of the team. During his career Carroll won one Leinster medal. He was an All-Ireland runner-up on one occasion.

At club level Carroll is a three-time championship medallist with Kinnitty.

His retirement came following the conclusion of the 1985-86 National League.

== Honours ==
=== Team ===
Kinnitty

- Offaly Senior Hurling Championship (1): 1983, 1984, 1985

Offaly

- Leinster Senior Hurling Championship (1): 1984
