= 1982 Munster Senior Hurling Championship final =

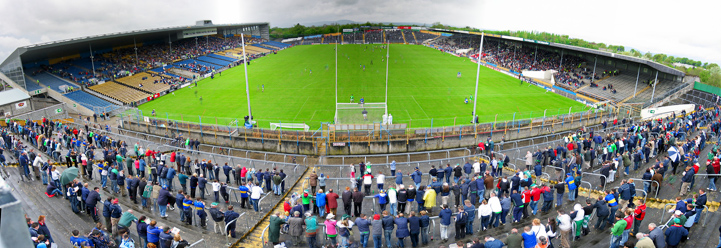
- Event: 1981 Munster Senior Hurling Championship
Cork	Waterford
5-31	3-6
- Date: 18 July 1982
- Venue: Semple Stadium, Thurles

The 1982 Munster Senior Hurling Championship final was a hurling match played at Semple Stadium on 18 July 1982 to determine the winners of the 1982 Munster Senior Hurling Championship.

The final remains notable in the competition's history for the unprecedented margin of victory. Cork's defeat of Waterford by 5-31 to 3-6 established a record for the largest winning margin in the Munster Senior Hurling Championship final, a record that stood for many years.

This was the 95th season of the Munster Senior Club Hurling Championship, a tournament organised by the Munster Council of the Gaelic Athletic Association. The Munster final between Cork and Waterford was the 9th Munster final meeting between the two teams. Cork were hoping for their 39th Munster title and their first win since 1979. Waterford were hoping for their 6th Munster title and their first win since 1963.

== Match ==
=== Summary ===
The comprehensive nature of the victory marked the start of a period of renewed championship success for Cork, who were captained by the legendary Jimmy Barry-Murphy. The Cork side demonstrated immense scoring power, which was the key feature of the match. The Rebels' final tally included a staggering 31 points scored over the bar, complementing their five goals.

A notable detail from the match is that the final featured the only instance for over 40 years of a Cork player scoring three or more goals in a Munster final. The player, Séamus O'Leary, scored a remarkable four goals (4-0) on the day, underscoring the dominance of their attacking performance.The line-up included key figures such as Ger Cunningham in goal, Brian Murphy and Dermot MacCurtain in the backline, and a forward unit spearheaded by Pat Horgan, Tony O'Sullivan, and Ray Cummins.

While the victory secured Cork their 39th Munster title and a place in the All-Ireland Senior Hurling Championship final, they were ultimately defeated by Kilkenny later that year. For Waterford, reaching the final was a high point for their season, having secured a significant victory over Limerick in the lead-up, though the final result meant their wait for a sixth Munster title continued from 1963.
