= 1977 Offaly Senior Hurling Championship =

Annual hurling competition season

- Champions: St Rynagh's (24th title); James Dooley (captain)
- Runners-up: Kinnitty; Des Egan (captain)

The 1977 Offaly Senior Hurling Championship was the 80th staging of the Offaly Senior Hurling Championship since its establishment by the Offaly County Board in 1896.

St Rynagh's entered the championship as the defending champions.

The final was played on 18 September 1977 at St Brendan's Park in Birr, between Coolderry and Kinnitty, in what was their fourth meeting in the final overall. Coolderry won the match by 1–07 to 1–06 to claim their 24th championship title overall and a first championship title in 14 years.

== Results ==
=== Final ===
18 September 1977 Final	Coolderry	1-07 - 1-06	Kinnitty	St Brendan's Park
