= 1985 Offaly Senior Hurling Championship =

Annual hurling competition season

- Champions: Kinnitty (9th title); Mark Corrigan (captain)
- Runners-up: Seir Kieran

The 1985 Offaly Senior Hurling Championship was the 88th staging of the Offaly Senior Hurling Championship since its establishment by the Offaly County Board in 1896.

Kinnitty entered the championship as the defending champions.

The final was played on 13 October 1985 at St Brendan's Park in Birr, between Kinnitty and Seir Kieran, in what was their first ever meeting in the final. Kinnitty won the match by 3–18 to 2–08 to claim their ninth championship title overall and a third successive title.

== Results ==
=== Semi-finals ===
| 29 September 1985 Semi-final | Seir Kieran | 1-13 - 0-13 | Coolderry | St Brendan's Park |
| | Joe Dooley 0-9, J Connors 1-1, K Dooley 0-2, J Mooney 0-1. | | P Moloughney 0-6, S Kennedy 0-4, J Miller 0-2, P O'Connor 0-1. |

| 29 September 1985 Semi-final | Kinnitty | 2-13 - 1-11 | St Rynagh's | St Brendan's Park |
| | P Corrigan 0-7, S Coughlan 1-1, J Flaherty 1-1, B Kennedy 0-2, S Donoghue 0-1, D Egan 0-1. | | P Horan 0-6, M Conneely 1-1, H Dolan 0-1, S White 0-1, A Fogarty 0-1, D Fogarty 0-1. |

=== Final ===
| 13 October 1985 Final | Kinnitty | 3-18 - 2-08 | Seir Kieran | St Brendan's Park |
| | P Corrigan 1-10, M Corrigan 2-2, J Flaherty 0-2, B Kennedy 0-2, P Delaney 0-1, S Coughlan 0-1. | | Joe Dooley 1-4, N Bergin 1-0, S Dooley 0-2, M Coughlan 0-1, E Coughlan 0-1. |
