= 1979 Offaly Senior Hurling Championship =

Annual hurling competition season

- Teams: 10
- Champions: Kinnitty (6th title); Matt Corrigan (captain)
- Runners-up: Coolderry; Martin Kennedy (captain)

The 1979 Offaly Senior Hurling Championship was the 82nd staging of the Offaly Senior Hurling Championship since its establishment by the Offaly County Board in 1896.

Kinnitty entered the championship as the defending champions.

The final, a replay, was played on 28 October 1979 at St Brendan's Park in Birr, between Kinnitty and Coolderry, in what was their fifth meeting in the final overall and a first meeting in two years. Kinnitty won the match by 5–08 to 1–11 to claim their sixth championship title overall and a second title in succession.

== Results ==
=== Final ===
21 October 1979 Final	Kinnitty	2-10 - 2-10	Coolderry	St Brendan's Park
	Mark Corrigan 0-6, T Carroll 1-0, T Hannon 1-0, J Flaherty 0-3, D Egan 0-1.		J Teehan 1-1, P Moloughney 0-4, P Teehan 1-0, P Carroll 0-2, C Loughnane 0-1, M Lyons 0-1, S Kennedy 0-1.

28 October 1979 Final replay	Kinnitty	5-08 - 1-11	Coolderry	St Brendan's Park
