= 1978 Offaly Senior Hurling Championship =

Annual hurling competition season

- Teams: 10
- Champions: Kinnitty (5th title); Tom Hannon (captain)
- Runners-up: St Rynagh's

The 1978 Offaly Senior Hurling Championship was the 81st staging of the Offaly Senior Hurling Championship since its establishment by the Offaly County Board in 1896.

Coolderry entered the championship as the defending champions, however, they were beaten by Kinnitty in the semi-finals. The group stage placings were confirmed on 7 February 1978.

The final was played on 5 November 1978 at St Brendan's Park in Birr, between Kinnitty and St Rynagh's, in what was their fifth meeting in the final overall and a first meeting in two years. Kinnitty won the match by 1–08 to 0–06 to claim their fifth championship title overall and a first title in 11 years.

== Results ==
=== Semi-finals ===
27 August 1978 Semi-final	St Rynagh's	1-13 - 0-12	Birr	St Brendan's Park

27 August 1978 Semi-final	Kinnitty	2-08 - 2-05	Coolderry	St Brendan's Park

=== Final ===
5 November 1978 Final	Kinnitty	1-08 - 0-06	St Rynagh's	St Brendan's Park
	J Flaherty 0-6, T Hannon 1-0, M Cleere 0-1, P Delaney 0-1.		G Woods 0-2, PJ Whelehan 0-1, J Horan 0-1, T Conneely 0-1, B Moylan 0-1.
