= Seán Ryan (dual player) =

Irish hurler and Gaelic footballer

Personal information
- Native name: Seán Ó Riain (Irish)
- Born: 28 November 1986 (age 39) Birr, County Offaly, Ireland
- Occupation: Secondary school teacher
- Height: 1.8 m (5 ft 11 in)

Sport
- Sport: Hurling
- Position: Midfield
Club
- Years: Club
- 2005-present: Birr
Club titles
- Offaly titles: 4
- Leinster titles: 1
- All-Ireland Titles: 0
Inter-county*
Years	County	Apps (scores)
2007-2017	Offaly	20 (1-09)
Inter-county titles
- Leinster titles: 0
- All-Irelands: 0
- NHL: 0
- All Stars: 0
- *Inter County team apps and scores correct as of 15:53, 28 May 2017.

Seán Ryan (born 28 November 1986) is an Irish hurler and former Gaelic footballer who plays as a midfielder for the Offaly senior team.

== Honours ==
Birr

- Leinster Senior Club Hurling Championship (1): 2007
- Offaly Senior Hurling Championship (4): 2005, 2006, 2007, 2008

Sporting positions
Preceded by Colin Egan	Offaly Senior Hurling Captain; 2017	Succeeded by David King
