= 1985 All-Ireland Senior Hurling Championship =

Championship details
- Teams: 14

All-Ireland champions
- Winning team: Offaly (2nd win)
- Captain: Pat Fleury
- Manager: Dermot Healy

Provincial champions
- Munster: Cork
- Leinster: Offaly
- Ulster: Antrim
- Connacht: Not Played

Championship statistics
- Player of the Year: Eugene Coughlan
- All-Star Team: See here

The All-Ireland Senior Hurling Championship of 1985 was the 99th edition of Ireland's premier hurling knockout competition. The championship ran from May to September of that year, culminating with the All-Ireland final, held at Croke Park, Dublin on 1 September. The match was contested by Offaly and Galway, with Offaly taking the title by 2–11 to 1–12. It was Offaly's second-ever All-Ireland title.

== Format ==
The All-Ireland Senior Hurling Championship was run on a provincial basis as usual. All games were played on a knockout basis whereby once a team lost they were eliminated from the championship. The format for the All-Ireland series of games ran as follows:

- The winners of the Munster Championship advanced directly to the first All-Ireland semi-final.
- The winners of the Leinster Championship advanced directly to the second All-Ireland semi-final.
- Galway, a team who faced no competition in the Connacht Championship, entered the championship at the All-Ireland semi-final stage where they played the Munster champions.
- The winners of the Ulster Championship advanced directly to a lone All-Ireland quarter-final where they played the winners of the All-Ireland 'B' championship. The winners of this game advanced to the All-Ireland semi-final where they played the Leinster champions.

== Team changes ==
=== To Championship ===
Promoted from the All-Ireland Senior B Hurling Championship

- London

=== From Championship ===
Relegated to the All-Ireland Senior B Hurling Championship

- None

== Teams ==
=== General information ===
Fourteen counties will compete in the All-Ireland Senior Hurling Championship: one team from the Connacht Senior Hurling Championship, six teams in the Leinster Senior Hurling Championship, five teams in the Munster Senior Hurling Championship, one team from the Ulster Senior Hurling Championship and one team from the All-Ireland Senior B Hurling Championship.

County	Last provincial title	Last championship title	Position in 1984 championship	Current championship
Antrim	1946	—		Ulster Senior Hurling Championship
Clare	1932	1914		Munster Senior Hurling Championship
Cork	1984	1984		Munster Senior Hurling Championship
Dublin	1961	1938		Leinster Senior Hurling Championship
Galway	1922	1980		Connacht Senior Hurling Championship
Kilkenny	1983	1983		Leinster Senior Hurling Championship
Laois	1949	1915		Leinster Senior Hurling Championship
Limerick	1981	1973		Munster Senior Hurling Championship
London	—	1901		All-Ireland Senior B Hurling Championship
Offaly	1984	1981		Leinster Senior Hurling Championship
Tipperary	1971	1971		Munster Senior Hurling Championship
Waterford	1963	1959		Munster Senior Hurling Championship
Westmeath	—	—		Leinster Senior Hurling Championship
Wexford	1977	1968		Leinster Senior Hurling Championship

== Provincial championships ==
=== Leinster Senior Hurling Championship ===
26 May 1985
Quarter-Final

Laois	4–16 – 2–10	Dublin
E. Fennelly (0–11), P. J. Cuddy (2–0), P. Cleary (1–2), M. Walsh (1–1), T. Taylor (0–1), P. Critchley (0–1).		P. Carton (1–3), E. O'Shea (1–0), J. Twomey (0–2), G. Hogarty (0–2), S. Dalton (0–1), L. Byrne (0–1), P. Mulhare (0–1).

O'Connor Park, Tullamore
Attendance: 5,000
Referee: P. Long (Kilkenny)

26 May 1985
Quarter-Final

Kilkenny	1–30 – 1–10	Westmeath
K. Brennan (1–9), G. Fennelly (0–6), B. Fitzpatrick (0–4), H. Ryan (0–4), R. Heffernan (0–3), J. Murphy (0–2), R. Power (0–1), G. Henderson (0–1).		B. McCabe (1–0), D. Kilcoyne (0–3), M. Kilcoyne (0–2), M. Cosgrave (0–2), R. Gallagher (0–1), J. Fitzsimons (0–1), P. Bradley (0–1).

O'Connor Park, Tullamore
Attendance: 5,000
Referee: J. Rankins (Laois)

24 June 1985
Semi-Final

Laois	1–18 – 2–13	Wexford
E. Fennelly (0–10), M. Walsh (0–4) M. Cuddy (1–0), P. J. Cuddy (0–2), P. Cleary (0–1), C. Jones (0–1).		T. Dempsey (1–3), M. Fitzhenry (1–1), J. Fleming (0–3), G. Coady (0–2), M. Quigley (0–1), P. Courtney (0–1), G. O'Connor (0–1), B. Byrne (0–1).

Croke Park, Dublin
Attendance: 29,586
Referee: N. O'Donoghue (Dublin)

24 June 1985
Semi-Final

Offaly	3–18 – 3–18	Kilkenny
P. Corrigan (1–6), M. Corrigan (1–3), J. Kelly (1–1), P. Delaney (0–4), P. Horan (0–2), P. Carroll (0–1), D. Owens (0–1).		L. Fennelly (2–0), H. Ryan (0–5), K. Brennan (0–4), C. Heffernan (1–0), G. Fennelly (0–3), P. Walsh (0–3), R. Power (0–2), R. Heffernan (0–1).

Croke Park, Dublin
Attendance: 29,586
Referee: N. O'Donoghue (Dublin)

14 July 1985
Semi-Final Replay

Offaly	1–20 – 0–17	Kilkenny
P. Corrigan (1–11), P. Cleary (0–3), P. Carroll (0–3), M. Corrigan (0–2), D. Owens (0–1).		K. Brennan (0–7), H. Ryan (0–2), L. Fennelly (0–2), J. Hennessy (0–1), G. Henderson (0–1), G. Fennelly (0–1), R. Heffernan (0–1), P. Walsh (0–1), R. Power (0–1).

Croke Park, Dublin
Attendance: 22,171
Referee: N. O'Donoghue (Dublin)

21 July 1985
Final

Offaly	5–15 – 0–17	Laois
M. Corrigan (1–5), P. Cleary (2–1), P. Horan (2–0), P. Delaney (0–3), P. Corrigan (0–2), J. Dooley (0–1), P. Carroll (0–1), G. Coughlan (0–1), F. Conneely (0–1).		E. Fennelly (0–7), M. O'Sullivan (0–4), M. Walsh (0–2), C. Jones (0–2), P. J. Cuddy (0–1), M. Cuddy (0–1).

Croke Park, Dublin
Attendance: 32,123
Referee: J. Denton (Wexford)

=== Munster Senior Hurling Championship ===
26 May 1985
Quarter-Final

Limerick	2–14 – 0–11	Waterford
P. Kelly (0–7), F. FitzGerald (1–3), R. Sampson (1–1), J. McKenna (0–2), M. Carroll (0–1).		D. Byrne (0–9), M. Ronayne (0–1), P. Ryan (0–1).

Páirc Uí Chaoimh, Cork
Attendance: 5,571
Referee: F. Murphy (Cork)

9 June 1985
Semi-Final

Clare	1–8 – 1–8	Tipperary
C. Lyons (0–4), T. Guilfoyle (1–0), V. Donnellan (0–2), D. Coote (0–1), A. Nugent (0–1).		M. Doyle (1–0), S. Power (0–2), J. McIntyre (0–1), I. Conroy (0–1), N. English (0–1), D. O'Connell (0–1), L. Maher (0–1), G. O'Neill (0–1).

Cusack Park, Ennis
Attendance: 21,305
Referee: J. Moore (Waterford)

16 June 1985
Semi-Final

Cork	2–13 – 1–9	Limerick
J. Fenton (1–5), J. Barry-Murphy (1–0), P. Hartnett (0–3), K. Hennessy (0–2), D. Walsh (0–2), T. O'Sullivan (0–1).		S. Fitzgibbon (1–3), M. Carroll (0–1), J. Carroll (0–1), R. Sampson (0–1), O. O'Connor (0–1), P. McCarthy (0–1), P. Kelly (0–1).

Páirc Uí Chaoimh, Cork
Attendance: 37,231
Referee: J. Moore (Waterford)

23 June 1985
Semi-Final Replay

Tipperary	5–14 – 4–6	Clare
S. Power (2–5), N. English (2–0), D. O'Connell (1–3), G. O'Neill (0–3), M. Doyle (0–1), M. Scully (0–1), L. Maher (0–1).		C. Lyons (1–4), V. Donnellan (2–0), T. Guilfoyle (0–1), G. McInerney (0–1).

Semple Stadium, Thurles
Attendance: 23,673
Referee: J. Moore (Waterford)

7 July 1985
Final

Cork	4–17 – 4–11	Tipperary
J. Fenton (1–6), J. Barry-Murphy (1–3), D. Walsh (1–2), T. Mulcahy (1–0), T. O'Sullivan (0–3), K. Hennessy (0–1), P. Horgan (0–1), D. Mac Curtain (0–1).		N. English (2–3), G. O'Neill (1–3), L. Maher (1–0), A. Ryan (0–1), S. Power (0–1), B. Ryan (0–1), I. Conroy (0–1), G. Stapleton (0–1).

Páirc Uí Chaoimh, Cork
Attendance: 48,902
Referee: J. Moore (Waterford)

== All-Ireland Senior Hurling Championship ==
=== All-Ireland quarter-finals ===
21 July 1985
Quarter-Final

Antrim	3–12 – 1–15	London
D. Donnelly (2–3), P. Boyle (0–4), B. Donnelly (1–0), C. Donnelly (0–2), J. McKiernan (0–2), C. McVeigh (0–1).		M. Burke (0–9), N. Uniack (1–1), D. Fox (0–3), J. McCormack (0–1), L. Walsh (0–1).

Casement Park, Belfast
Referee: G. Ryan (Tipperary)

=== All-Ireland semi-finals ===
4 August 1985
Semi-Final

Offaly	3–17 – 0–12	Antrim
P. Cleary (2–2), M. Corrigan (1–5), P. Corrigan (0–5), D. Owens (0–3), J. Dooley (0–1), P. Delaney (0–1).		D. Donnelly (0–4), C. McVeigh (0–2), C. Donnelly (0–2), G. Cunningham (0–1), D. McKinley (0–1), P. McKillen (0–1), P. Boyle (0–1).

Croke Park, Dublin
Attendance: 8,205
Referee: G. Ryan (Tipperary)

4 August 1985
Semi-Final

Galway	4–12 – 5–5	Cork
P. J. Molloy (0–5), B. Forde (1–3), N. Lane (1–2), J. Cooney (1–1), B. Lynskey (1–0), M. McGrath (0–1).		J. Fenton (2–2), K. Hennessy (2–1), K. Kingston (1–0), D. Walsh (0–1), T. Crowley (0–1).

Croke Park, Dublin
Attendance: 8,205
Referee: N. O'Donoghue (Dublin)

=== All-Ireland Final ===
1 September 1985
Final

Offaly	2–11 – 1–12	Galway
P. Cleary (2–0), P. Corrigan (0–5), P. Horan (0–3), M. Corrigan (0–2), B. Bermingham (0–1).		P. J. Molloy (1–6), B. Lynskey (0–2), M. McGrath (0–1), J. Cooney (0–1), N. Lane (0–1), T. Keady (0–1).

Croke Park, Dublin
Attendance: 61,451
Referee: G. Ryan (Tipperary)

Offaly	Galway

== Championship statistics ==
=== Miscellaneous ===
- Laois qualified for the Leinster final for the first time since 1951.
- In the All-Ireland semi-final, Galway defeated Cork for only the third time in the history of the championship. Previous victories for the Galway men came in the All-Ireland semi-finals of 1975 and 1979.

== Top scorers ==
=== Season ===
Rank	Player	County	Tally	Total	Matches	Average
1	Paddy Corrigan	Offaly	2–29	35	5	7.00
2	Pat Cleary	Offaly	7–9	30	5	6.00
3	Eugene Fennelly	Laois	0–28	28	3	9.33
4	Mark Corrigan	Offaly	3–17	26	5	5.20
5	John Fenton	Cork	4-13	25	3	8.33
6	Pat Cleary	Offaly	6-6	24	4	6.00
7	Kieran Brennan	Kilkenny	1–20	23	3	7.66
8	Nicky English	Tipperary	4-4	16	3	5.33
9	Séamus Power	Tipperary	2-8	14	3	4.66
9	P. J. Molloy	Galway	1-11	14	2	7.00

=== Single game ===
Rank	Player	County	Tally	Total	Opposition
1	Paddy Corrigan	Offaly	1–11	14	Kilkenny
2	Kieran Brennan	Kilkenny	1–9	12	Westmeath
3	Séamus Power	Tipperary	2–5	11	Clare
3	Eugene Fennelly	Laois	0–11	11	Dublin
5	Eugene Fennelly	Laois	0–10	10	Wexford
6	Nicky English	Tipperary	2–3	9	Cork
6	Dessie Donnelly	Antrim	2–3	9	London
6	Paddy Corrigan	Offaly	1–6	9	Kilkenny
6	John Fenton	Cork	1–6	9	Tipperary
6	P. J. Molloy	Galway	1–6	9	Offaly
6	Denis Byrne	Waterford	0–9	9	Limerick
6	Mick Burke	London	0–9	9	Antrim
