= 1980 All-Ireland Senior Hurling Championship =

Irish intercounty hurling championship

Championship details
- Dates: 25 May – 7 September 1980
- Teams: 12

All-Ireland champions
- Winning team: Galway (2nd win)
- Captain: Joe Connolly
- Manager: Cyril Farrell

All-Ireland Finalists
- Losing team: Limerick
- Captain: Seán Foley
- Manager: Noel Drumgoole

Provincial champions
- Munster: Limerick
- Leinster: Offaly
- Ulster: Not Played
- Connacht: Not Played

Championship statistics
- No. matches played: 11
- Goals total: 52 (4.72 per game)
- Points total: 279 (25.36 per game)
- Top Scorer: Éamonn Cregan (5–18)
- Player of the Year: Joe Connolly
- All-Star Team: See here

The 1980 All-Ireland Senior Hurling Championship was the 94th staging of the All-Ireland Senior Hurling Championship, the Gaelic Athletic Association's premier inter-county hurling tournament. The draw for the 1980 fixtures took place in September 1979. The championship began on 25 May 1980 and ended on 7 September 1980.

Kilkenny were the defending champions but were defeated by Offaly in the Leinster final. Laois re-entered the Leinster Championship, having won the All-Ireland Senior B Hurling Championship the previous year.

On 7 September 1980, Galway won the championship following a 2–15 to 3–9 defeat of Limerick in the All-Ireland final. This was their second All-Ireland title, their first in fifty-seven championship seasons.

Limerick's Éamonn Cregan was the championship's top scorer with 5–18. Galway's Joe Connolly was the choice for Texaco Hurler of the Year.

== Format ==
After a series of disappointing Munster finals in previous years, the Munster Council took the risk of a repetition and decided to stick with an open draw for the 1980 championship. Similarly, the Leinster Council decided to abandon their policy of seeding Kilkenny and Wexford on opposite sides of the draw in favour of an open draw.

== Team changes ==
=== To Championship ===
Promoted from the All-Ireland Senior B Hurling Championship

- Kildare

=== From Championship ===
Relegated to the All-Ireland Senior B Hurling Championship

- None

== Teams ==
=== General information ===
Twelve counties will compete in the All-Ireland Senior Hurling Championship: six teams in the Leinster Senior Hurling Championship, five teams in the Munster Senior Hurling Championship and one team from the All-Ireland Senior B Hurling Championship.

County	Last provincial title	Last championship title	Position in 1979 Championship	Current championship
Clare	1932	1914	Semi-finals (Munster Senior Hurling Championship)	Munster Senior Hurling Championship
Cork	1979	1978	Semi-finals	Munster Senior Hurling Championship
Dublin	1961	1938	Semi-finals (Leinster Senior Hurling Championship)	Leinster Senior Hurling Championship
Galway	1922	1923	Runners-up	Leinster Senior Hurling Championship
Kildare	—	—	Semi-finals (All-Ireland Senior B Hurling Championship)	All-Ireland Senior B Hurling Championship
Kilkenny	1979	1979	Champions	Leinster Senior Hurling Championship
Laois	1949	1915	Quarter-finals	Leinster Senior Hurling Championship
Limerick	1974	1973	Runners-up (Munster Senior Hurling Championship)	Munster Senior Hurling Championship
Offaly	—	—	Semi-finals (Leinster Senior Hurling Championship)	Leinster Senior Hurling Championship
Tipperary	1971	1971	Semi-finals (Munster Senior Hurling Championship)	Munster Senior Hurling Championship
Waterford	1963	1959	Quarter-finals (Munster Senior Hurling Championship)	Munster Senior Hurling Championship
Wexford	1977	1968	Runners-up (Leinster Senior Hurling Championship)	Leinster Senior Hurling Championship

== Provincial championships ==
=== Leinster Senior Hurling Championship ===
Quarter-final

25 May 1980 Quarter-final	Laois	0–12 – 2–10	Offaly	O'Moore Park, Portlaoise
	F. Keenan (0–6), C. Jones (0–4), M. Walsh (0–1).		J. Flaherty (1–5), M. Corrigan (1–2), K. Dollard (0–1), J. Kelly (0–3).	Referee: N. O'Donoghue (Dublin)

Semi-finals

15 June 1980 Semi-final	Offaly	0–18 – 0–10	Dublin	Croke Park, Dublin
	P. Horan (0–6), P. Kirwan (0–4), J. Flaherty (0–4), M. Corrigan (0–3), B. Keeshan (0–1).		G. Hayes (0–4), J. Cunningham (0–2), V. Holden (0–2), J. Morris (0–2).	Referee: J. Denton (Wexford)

15 June 1980 Semi-final	Kilkenny	4–18 – 3–16	Wexford	Croke Park, Dublin
	B. Fitzpatrick (1–11), M. Ruth (1–1), M. Kennedy (1–1), M. Brennan (1–1), G. Fennelly (0–2), J. Hennessy (0–1), J. Wall (0–1).		N. Buggy (2–1), T. Doran (1–1), M. Casey (0–4), S. Kinsella (0–3), J. Murphy (0–3), G. O'Connor (0–2), M. Jacob (0–1), J. Higgins (0–1).	Referee: G. Kirwan (Offaly)

Final

13 July 1980 Final	Offaly	3–17 – 5–10	Kilkenny	Croke Park, Dublin
	J. Flaherty (2–0), P. Horan (0–6), B. Bermingham (1–2), M. Corrigan (0–4), P. Kirwan (0–4), J. Kelly (0–1).		M. Ruth (3–1), B. Fitzpatrick (1–5), M. Crotty (1–0), J. Hennessy (0–1), G. Fennelly (0–1), J. Wall (0–1), K. Fennelly (0–1).	Attendance: 9,613; Referee: N. O'Donoghue (Dublin)

=== Munster Senior Hurling Championship ===
Quarter-final

1 June 1980 Quarter-final	Clare	3–13 – 2–11	Waterford	Gaelic Grounds, Limerick
	N. Ryan (2–2), E. O'Connor (1–2), J. Callinan (0–3), C. Honan (0–2), S. Hehir (0–1), T. Ryan (0–1), P. O'Connor (0–1), M. Meehan (0–1).		P. Curran (1–0), M. Hickey (1–0), M. Walsh (0–3), D. Fitzpatrick (0–3), E. Rockett (0–2), M. Ormond (0–1), M. Whelan (0–1).	Referee: J. Moloney (Tipperary)

Semi-finals

16 June 1980 Semi-final	Limerick	3–13 – 2–9	Clare	Gaelic Grounds, Limerick
	E. Cregan (2–5), J. McKenna (1–1), O. O'Connor (0–3), W. Fitzmaurice (0–2), David Punch (0–1), L. O'Donoghue (0–1).		C. Honan (1–2), E. O'Connor (1–1), P. Morey (0–3), N. Casey (0–1), S. Hehir (0–1), P. O'Connor (0–1).	Attendance: 16,000; Referee: G. Ryan (Tipperary)

22 June 1980 Semi-final	Tipperary	1–12 – 2–17	Cork	Semple Stadium, Thurles
	S. Bourke (1–3), T. Butler (0–4), P. Queally (0–2), G. Stapleton (0–1), E. O'Shea (0–1), J. Kehoe (0–1).		J. Fenton (0–7), T. Cashman (1–2), R. Cummins (0–4), S. O'Leary (1–0), P. Horgan (0–2), E. O'Donoghue (0–1), J. Barry-Murphy (0–1).	Attendance: 42,836; Referee: J. J. Landers (Waterford)

Final

20 July 1980 Final	Limerick	2–14 – 2–10	Cork	Semple Stadium, Thurles
	E. Cregan (1–6), O. O'Connor (1–1), David Punch (0–2), J. McKenna (0–1), L. O'Donoghue (0–1), W. Fitzmaurice (0–1), S. Foley (0–1), J. Carroll (0–1).		J. Fenton (0–6), E. O'Donoghue (1–1), S. O'Leary (1–0), D. Coughlan (0–1), T. Crowley (0–1), P. Horgan (0–1).	Attendance: 43,090; Referee: J. J. Landers (Waterford)

== All-Ireland Senior Hurling Championship ==
Quarter-finals		Semi-finals		Final
Galway	5–15
Kildare	1–11	Offaly	3–10
		Galway	4–09
				Galway	2–15
				Limerick	3–09

=== All-Ireland quarter-finals ===
20 July 1980 Quarter-final	Galway	5–15 – 1–11	Kildare	Croke Park, Dublin
	Joe Connolly (3–5), John Connolly (1–2), F. Burke (1–1), M. Connolly (0–3), P. J. Molloy (0–1), P. Ryan (0–1), B. Forde (0–1), I. Clarke (0–1).		M. Moore (1–2), J. Walsh (0–5), T. Carew (0–3), N. Walsh (0–1).	Attendance: 3,668; Referee: J. O'Meara (Tipperary)

=== All-Ireland semi-finals ===
3 August 1980 Semi-final	Galway	4–9 – 3–10	Offaly	Croke Park, Dublin
	John Connolly (2–0), N. Lane (1–2), B. Forde (1–2), I. Clarke (0–1), Joe Connolly (0–1), S. Linnane (0–1), S. Mahon (0–1), P. J. Molloy (0–1).	Report	B. Bermingham (2–0), M. Corrigan (1–1), P. Horan (0–4), J. Flaherty (0–2), P. Carroll (0–2), P. Delaney (0–1).	Attendance: 21,280; Referee: J. J. Landers (Waterford)

=== All-Ireland Final ===
7 September 1980 Final	Galway	2–15 – 3–9	Limerick	Croke Park, Dublin
	B. Forde (1–5), Joe Connolly (0–4), P. J. Molloy (1–0), N. Lane (0–3), John Connolly (0–2), J. Ryan (0–1).		E. Cregan (2–7), J. McKenna (1–1), B. Carroll (0–1).	Attendance: 64,895; Referee: N. O'Donoghue (Dublin)

== Championship statistics ==
=== Miscellaneous ===
- For the first time since 1969 the Leinster final sees a pairing other than Kilkenny and Wexford.
- The Leinster final sees Offaly defeat Kilkenny to take their very first provincial title.
- Limerick's victory in the Munster final foils Cork's hopes of an unprecedented sixth provincial title in-a-row.
- In the All-Ireland semi-final between Galway and Offaly the referee, J. J. Landers, signalled the end of the game with 52 seconds of normal time yet to be played and at least another half a minute of 'lost' time to be added on. Offaly were in the middle of a comeback at that stage, after cutting Galway's lead from nine points to just two. The game is also the first-ever championship meeting between these two sides.
- Galway's victory over Limerick in the championship decider is their first All-Ireland title since 1923.

== Scoring statistics ==
Top scorers overall

Rank	Player	County	Tally	Total	Matches	Average
1	Éamonn Cregan	Limerick	5–18	33	3	11.00
2	Billy Fitzpatrick	Kilkenny	2–16	22	2	11.00
3	Johnny Flaherty	Offaly	3–11	20	4	5.00
4	Joe Connolly	Galway	3–10	19	3	6.33
5	Mark Corrigan	Offaly	2–10	16	4	4.00
5	Pádraig Horan	Offaly	0–16	16	3	5.33
7	Matt Ruth	Kilkenny	4-02	14	2	7.00
7	Bernie Forde	Galway	2-08	14	3	4.66
9	John Connolly	Galway	3-04	13	3	4.33
9	John Fenton	Cork	0–13	13	2	6.50

Top scorers in a single game

Rank	Player	County	Tally	Total	Opposition
1	Joe Connolly	Galway	3–05	14	Kildare
1	Billy Fitzpatrick	Kilkenny	1–11	14	Wexford
3	Éamonn Cregan	Limerick	2–07	13	Galway
4	Éamonn Cregan	Limerick	2–05	11	Clare
5	Matt Ruth	Kilkenny	3–01	10	Offaly
6	Éamonn Cregan	Limerick	1–06	9	Cork
7	Noel Ryan	Clare	2–02	8	Waterford
7	Bernie Forde	Galway	1–05	8	Limerick
7	Billy Fitzpatrick	Kilkenny	1–05	8	Offaly
7	Johnny Flaherty	Offaly	1–05	8	Laois

== Broadcasting ==
The following matches were broadcast live on television in Ireland on RTÉ.

Round	RTÉ
All-Ireland semi-final	Galway vs Offaly
All-Ireland final	Limerick vs Galway

== Sources ==
- Corry, Eoghan, The GAA Book of Lists (Hodder Headline Ireland, 2005).
- Donegan, Des, The Complete Handbook of Gaelic Games (DBA Publications Limited, 2005).
