= Offaly Senior Hurling Championship =

Annual hurling competition

- Current season or competition: 2026 Offaly Senior Hurling Championship
- Code: Hurling
- Founded: 1896; 130 years ago
- Region: Offaly (GAA)
- Trophy: Seán Robbins Cup
- No. of teams: 10 (Senior); 6 (Senior B)
- Title holders: Kilcormac–Killoughey (8th title)
- First winner: Killoughey
- Most titles: Coolderry (31 titles)
- Sponsors: Molloy Precast & Environmental Systems
- TV partner: TG4 (final only)
- Official website: Official website

The Offaly Senior Hurling Championship (known for sponsorship reasons as the Molloy Environmental Senior Hurling Championship) is an annual hurling competition contested by top-tier Offaly GAA clubs. The Offaly County Board of the Gaelic Athletic Association has organised it since 1896.

Kilcormac–Killoughey are the title-holders, defeating Ballinamere by 0–19 to 0–17 in the 2026 final.

== History ==
The title has been won at least once by 12 different teams. The all-time record-holders are Coolderry, who have won a total of 31 titles.

Since the beginning, the championship has been dominated by Coolderry, Birr, Drumcullen and St Rynagh's. They have won a combined total of 90 of the 124 championship titles. Coolderry dominated the first twenty years of the championship, winning eleven titles between 1889 and 1917. After this initial golden age, Coolderry regularly claimed championship titles in each of the following decades. After making their own breakthrough in 1908, Drumcullen went on to become the team of the decade during the 1920s after winning eight titles between 1918 and 1933. Tullamore and Birr subsequently came to the fore, winning eleven titles between them between 1932 and 1948.

Drumcullen enjoyed their most successful decade when they won seven championships between 1950 and 1960. This would be their last championship title. St Rynagh's inscribed their name on the roll of honour for the first time in 1965. They became the preeminent team of the next three decades and won 16 championship titles between 1965 and 1993. By this stage Birr had begun their own golden era. After winning their first championship in twenty years in 1991, the club went on to claim eleven more titles between then and 2008.

== Format ==
The series of games are played during the spring, summer and autumn months with the county final currently being played at O'Connor Park in November. The prize for the winning team is the Seán Robbins Cup. Initially played as a knock-out competition, the championship currently features a group stage followed by a knock-out stage.

== Teams ==
=== 2026 Teams ===
The 10 teams competing in the 2026 Offaly Senior Hurling Championship were:

Team	Location	Championship titles	Last championship title
Ballinamere	Ballykimurray	0	—
Belmont	Belmont	0	—
Birr	Birr	22	2008
Coolderry	Coolderry	31	2018
Lusmagh	Lusmagh	1	1989
Kilcormac–Killoughey	Kilcormac and Killoughey	8	2026
Kinnitty	Kinnitty	9	1985
Shinrone	Shinrone	1	2022
St Rynagh's	Cloghan and Banagher	20	2021
Tullamore	Tullamore	10	2009

== Honours ==
The winning team is presented with the Seán Robbins Cup. A native of Birr, Robbins served two terms as county chairman and served as Leinster Council chairman. He was also a president of the county board and was also a prominent referee at All-Ireland AND Leinster levels. The cup was first presented in 1960.

The Offaly Senior Hurling Championship winners qualify for the subsequent Leinster Senior Club Hurling Championship. This place is reserved for club teams only as divisional and amalgamated teams are not allowed in the provincial championship.

The Offaly County Championship is an integral part of the wider Leinster Senior Club Hurling Championship. The winners of the Offaly county final join the champions of the other hurling counties to contest the provincial championship.

== List of finals ==
=== Legend ===
- Gold – Leinster senior club champions
- Silver – Leinster senior club runners-up
- (r) = replay

=== List of Offaly SHC finals ===
Year	Winners		Runners-up	
Year	Club	Score	Club	Score
1896	Killoughey	2-05	Rahan	1-00
1897	Killoughey	2-03	Kinnitty	2-01
1898	Fortal	2-01	Killoughey	0-01
1899	Coolderry	3-02	Fortal	1-01
1900	Cadamstown	3-00	Fortal	1-03
1901	Coolderry	4-00	Killoughey	1-03
1902	Cadamstown	3-01	Tullamore	3-00
1903	Coolderry		Kilcormac	
1904	Coolderry		Tullamore	
1905	Coolderry		Kilcormac	
1906	Coolderry		Moneygall	
1907	Killoughey		Kilcormac	
1908	Drumcullen		Ballinamere	
1909	Tullamore		Drumcullen	
1910	Coolderry		Killoughey	
1911	Coolderry		Edenderry	
1912	Birr		Killoughey	
1913	Birr		Edenderry	
1914	Coolderry		Killoughey	
1915	Birr		Rahan	
1916	Coolderry		Rahan	
1917	Coolderry		Tullamore	
1918	Drumcullen		Rahan	
1919	Drumcullen		Rahan	
1920	Kinnitty		Coolderry	
1921	No competition			
1922	No competition			
1923	Kinnitty		Clara	
1924	Drumcullen		Clara	
1925	Drumcullen		Kinnitty	
1926	Coolderry		Tullamore	
1927	Drumcullen	9–05	Clara	1–02
1928	Drumcullen	4–00	Birr	1–02
1929	Drumcullen	3–01	Coolderry	1–03
1930	Kinnitty		Coolderry	
1931	Coolderry		Drumcullen	
1932	Tullamore		Coolderry	
1933	Drumcullen		Kinnitty	
1934	Tullamore		Drumcullen	
1935	Tullamore		Clara	
1936	Tullamore		Rahan	
1937	Tullamore		Coolderry	
1938	Birr		Coolderry	
1939	Coolderry		Clareen	
1940	Birr	4–08	Edenderry	2–01
1941	Drumcullen	2–05	Birr	0–07
1942	Coolderry	5–03	Birr	3–04
1943	Birr	2-08	Tullamore	2-04
1944	Birr	4-04	Tullamore	4-00
1945	Coolderry	4-06	Tullamore	2-03
1946	Birr	6-09	Tullamore	2-03
1947	Coolderry	4-06	Birr	2-03
1948	Birr	4-06	Coolderry	1-03
1949	Coolderry	9-09	Drumcullen	3-09
1950	Drumcullen	4-07	Coolderry	0-05
1951	Drumcullen	2-11	Birr	5-02
1952	Drumcullen	9-11	Seir Kieran	4-03
1953	Coolderry	4-04	Rahan	1-06
1954	Drumcullen	4-03	Coolderry	3-02
1955	Tullamore	4-10	Drumcullen	3-10
1956	Coolderry	3-05	Drumcullen	1-08
1957	Drumcullen	10–07	Shannon Rovers	1–03
1958	Drumcullen	3-05	Coolderry	1-08
1959	Tullamore	3-12	Coolderry	3-01
1960	Drumcullen	4-11	Shinrone	4-10
1961	Coolderry	w/o	Drumcullen	
1962	Coolderry	2-12	Drumcullen	1-05
1963	Coolderry	4-07	Drumcullen	3-04
1964	Tullamore	1–11	St Rynagh's	3–01
1965	St Rynagh's	2–12	Coolderry	1–09
1966	St Rynagh's	6–10	Drumcullen	4–05
1967	Kinnitty	4–08	Coolderry	3–06
1968	St Rynagh's	1–12	Coolderry	3–04
1969	St Rynagh's	4–07	Kinnitty	1–09
1970	St Rynagh's	1–12	Kinnitty	2–08
1971	Birr	2–10	St Rynagh's	2–09
1972	St Rynagh's	4–10	Kinnitty	1–06
1973	St Rynagh's	0–12	Drumcullen	1–07
1974	St Rynagh's	1–11	Birr	2–03
1975	St Rynagh's	0–05, 0–14 (r)	Birr	0–05, 0–08 (r)
1976	St Rynagh's	3–11	Kinnitty	0–05
1977	Coolderry	1–07	Kinnitty	1–06
1978	Kinnitty	1–08	St Rynagh's	0–06
1979	Kinnitty	5–08	Coolderry	1–11
1980	Coolderry	3–03	Kinnitty	1–05
1981	St Rynagh's	1–10	Kinnitty	1–07
1982	St Rynagh's	2–09	Lusmagh	0–11
1983	Kinnitty	0–20	St Rynagh's	2–06
1984	Kinnitty	1–12	St Rynagh's	1–06
1985	Kinnitty	3–18	Seir Kieran	2–08
1986	Coolderry	3–08	St Rynagh's	1–10
1987	St Rynagh's	0–11	Seir Kieran	0–09
1988	Seir Kieran	3–13	St Rynagh's	4–06
1989	Lusmagh	1–11	Seir Kieran	1–10
1990	St Rynagh's	2–06	Birr	1–07
1991	Birr	1–12	Seir Kieran	1–11
1992	St Rynagh's	0–10	Lusmagh	0–09
1993	St Rynagh's	1–16	Birr	1–14
1994	Birr	0–08	Seir Kieran	0–07
1995	Seir Kieran	1–13, 0–10 (r)	St Rynagh's	1–13, 0–09 (r)
1996	Seir Kieran	0–13	St Rynagh's	1–08
1997	Birr	0–14	Seir Kieran	2–04
1998	Seir Kieran	1–10, 1–11 (r)	St Rynagh's	0–13, 0–09 (r)
1999	Birr	3–15	St Rynagh's	1–11
2000	Birr	3–21	Seir Kieran	1–09
2001	Birr	0–11	St Rynagh's	0–10
2002	Birr	3–11	Kilcormac–Killoughey	2–07
2003	Birr	1–18	Ballyskenagh	1–11
2004	Coolderry	3–10	Birr	2–11
2005	Birr	0–20	Coolderry	0–05
2006	Birr	0–11, 2–09 (r)	Coolderry	1–08, 1–11 (r)
2007	Birr	0–15	Kilcormac–Killoughey	0–10
2008	Birr	1–15	Kinnitty	0–15
2009	Tullamore	2–12	Kilcormac–Killoughey	0–11
2010	Coolderry	3–15	Tullamore	1–12
2011	Coolderry	2–14	Birr	0–16
2012	Kilcormac–Killoughey	2–16	St Rynagh's	2–12
2013	Kilcormac–Killoughey	1–21	Birr	1–14
2014	Kilcormac–Killoughey	2–18	St Rynagh's	1–09
2015	Coolderry	2–15	St Rynagh's	1–16
2016	St Rynagh's	2–16	Birr	1–15
2017	Kilcormac–Killoughey	2–16	St Rynagh's	1–16
2018	Coolderry	2–17	Kilcormac–Killoughey	0–17
2019	St Rynagh's	0–16	Birr	1–12
2020	St Rynagh's	1–19	Kilcormac–Killoughey	1–13
2021	St Rynagh's	1–11	Coolderry	0–12
2022	Shinrone	0–26	Kilcormac–Killoughey	2–13
2023	Kilcormac–Killoughey	3–26	Shinrone	3–08
2024	Kilcormac–Killoughey	0–16	Ballinamere	1–11
2025	Kilcormac–Killoughey	1-24	Shinrone	2-14
2026	Kilcormac–Killoughey	0-19	Ballinamere	0-17

== Roll of honour ==
=== By club ===
#	Club	Titles	Runners-up	Championship wins	Championship runner-up
1	Coolderry	31	18	1899, 1901, 1903, 1904, 1905, 1906, 1910, 1911, 1914, 1916, 1917, 1926, 1931, 1939, 1942, 1945, 1947, 1949, 1953, 1956, 1961, 1962, 1963, 1977, 1980, 1986, 2004, 2010, 2011, 2015, 2018	1920, 1929, 1930, 1932, 1937, 1938, 1948, 1950, 1954, 1958, 1959, 1965, 1967, 1968, 1979, 2005, 2006, 2021
2	Birr	22	13	1912, 1913, 1915, 1938, 1940, 1943, 1944, 1946, 1948, 1971, 1991, 1994, 1997, 1999, 2000, 2001, 2002, 2003, 2005, 2006, 2007, 2008	1928, 1941, 1942, 1951, 1974, 1975, 1990, 1993, 2004, 2011, 2013, 2016, 2019
3	St Rynagh's	20	16	1965, 1966, 1968, 1969, 1970, 1972, 1973, 1974, 1975, 1976, 1981, 1982, 1987, 1990, 1992, 1993, 2016, 2019, 2020, 2021	1964, 1971, 1978, 1983, 1984, 1986, 1988, 1995, 1996, 1998, 1999, 2001, 2012, 2014, 2015, 2017
4	Drumcullen	17	11	1908, 1918, 1919, 1924, 1925, 1927, 1928, 1929, 1933, 1941, 1950, 1951, 1952, 1954, 1957, 1958, 1960	1909, 1931, 1934, 1949, 1955, 1956, 1961, 1962, 1963, 1966, 1973
5	Tullamore	10	9	1909, 1932, 1934, 1935, 1936, 1937, 1955, 1959, 1964, 2009	1902, 1904, 1917, 1926, 1943, 1944, 1945, 1946, 2010
6	Kinnitty	9	11	1920, 1923, 1930, 1967, 1978, 1979, 1983, 1984, 1985	1897, 1925, 1933, 1969, 1970, 1972, 1976, 1977, 1980, 1981, 2008
7	Kilcormac–Killoughey	8	8	2012, 2013, 2014, 2017, 2023, 2024, 2025, 2026	1903, 1905, 1907, 2007, 2008, 2018, 2020, 2022
8	Seir Kieran	4	7	1988, 1995, 1996, 1998	1952, 1987, 1989, 1991, 1994, 1997, 2000
9	Killoughey	3	5	1896, 1897, 1907	1898, 1901, 1910, 1912, 1914
10	Cadamstown	2	0	1900, 1902	—
11	Shinrone	1	3	2022	1960, 2023, 2025
11	Lusmagh	1	2	1989	1982, 1992
11	Fortal	1	2	1898	1899, 1900
14	Rahan	0	7	—	1896, 1915, 1916, 1918, 1919, 1936, 1953
14	Clara	0	4	—	1923, 1924, 1927, 1935
14	Edenderry	0	3	—	1911, 1913, 1940
14	Moneygall	0	1	—	1906
14	Clareen	0	1	—	1939
14	Shannon Rovers	0	1	—	1957
14	Ballinamere	0	2	—	2024, 2026

== Records and statistics ==
=== Managers ===
Managers in the Offaly Championship are involved in the day-to-day running of the team, including the training, team selection, and sourcing of players. Their influence varies from club-to-club and is related to the individual club committees. The manager is assisted by a team of two or three selectors and a backroom team consisting of various coaches.

Winning managers
Manager	Team(s)	Wins	Winning years
Pad Joe Whelehan	Birr	8	1997, 1999, 2000, 2001, 2002, 2003, 2007, 2008
Ken Hogan	Birr; Coolderry; St Rynagh's	6	1991, 2010, 2011, 2019, 2020, 2021
Danny Owens	Kilcormac–Killoughey	3	2012, 2013, 2014
John Goode	Birr	2	2005, 2006
Shane Hand	Kilcormac–Killoughey	2	2023, 2024
Kevin Martin	Tullamore	1	2009
Johnny Kelly	Coolderry	1	2015
Francis Forde	St Rynagh's	1	2016
Stephen Byrne	Kilcormac–Killoughey	1	2017
Joachim Kelly	Coolderry	1	2018
Trevor Fletcher	Shinrone	1	2022
Declan Laffen	Kilcormac–Killoughey	1	2025

=== Teams ===
==== By decade ====
The most successful team of each decade, judged by the number of Offaly Senior Hurling Championship titles, is as follows:

- 1890s: 2 for Killoughey (1896–97)
- 1900s: 5 for Coolderry (1901–03–04–05–06)
- 1910s: 5 for Coolderry (1910–11–14–16–17)
- 1920s: 5 for Drumcullen (1924–25–27–28–29)
- 1930s: 5 for Tullamore (1932–34–35–36–37)
- 1940s: 5 for Birr (1940–43–44–46–48)
- 1950s: 6 for Drumcullen (1950–51–52–54–57–58)
- 1960s: 4 for St Rynagh's (1965–66–68–69)
- 1970s: 6 for St Rynagh's (1970–72–73–74–75–76)
- 1980s: 3 each for St Rynagh's (1981–82–87) and Kinnitty (1983–84–85)
- 1990s: 4 for Birr (1991–94–97–99)
- 2000s: 8 for Birr (2000–01–02–03–05–06–07–08)
- 2010s: 4 for Kilcormac–Killoughey (2012–13–14–17) 4 for Coolderry (2010–11–15–18)
- 2020s: 4 for Kilcormac–Killoughey (2023–24–25-26)

==== Gaps ====
Top ten longest gaps between successive championship titles:

- 45 years: Tullamore (1964–2009)
- 44 years: Kinnitty (1923–1967)
- 23 years: Tullamore (1909–1932)
- 23 years: Birr (1915–1938)
- 23 years: Birr (1948–1971)
- 23 years: St Rynagh's (1993–2016)
- 20 years: Birr (1971–1991)
- 18 years: Tullamore (1937–1955)
- 18 years: Coolderry (1986–2004)
- 14 years: Coolderry (1963–1977)

=== Top scorers ===
==== By year ====
Year	Top scorer	Team	Score	Total
2008	Shane Dooley	Tullamore	5–32	47
2009	Joe Bergin	Seir Kieran	5–63	78
2010	Shane Dooley	Tullamore	7–61	82
2011	Damien Murray	Coolderry	2–40	46
2012	Ciarán Slevin	Kilcormac–Killoughey	2–55	61
2013	Ciarán Slevin	Kilcormac–Killoughey	1–75	78
2014	Brian Carroll	Coolderry	4–63	75
2015	Damien Murray	Coolderry	4–63	75
2016	Colm Coughlan	Kinnitty	1–68	71
2017	Joe Bergin	Seir Kieran	7–54	75
2018	Aidan Treacy	St Rynagh's	1–82	85
2019	Eoghan Cahill	Birr	2–83	89
2020	Eoghan Cahill	Birr	0-45	45
2021	Brian Carroll	Coolderry	4-67	79
2022	Eoghan Cahill	Birr	1–64	67
2023	Brian Duignan	Ballinamere	1–38	41
2024	Adam Screeney	Kilcormac–Killoughey	3-50	59
2025	Adam Screeney	Kilcormac–Killoughey	1-51	54

== See also ==
- Offaly Senior B Hurling Championship
- Offaly Intermediate Hurling Championship
- Offaly Junior A Hurling Championship
