= 1981 All-Ireland Senior Hurling Championship =

Championship details
- Dates: 24 May – 6 September 1981
- Teams: 13

All-Ireland champions
- Winning team: Offaly (1st win)
- Captain: Pádraig Horan
- Manager: Dermot Healy

All-Ireland Finalists
- Losing team: Galway
- Captain: Seán Silke
- Manager: Cyril Farrell

Provincial champions
- Munster: Limerick
- Leinster: Offaly
- Ulster: Not Played
- Connacht: Not Played

Championship statistics
- No. matches played: 14
- Goals total: 67 (4.78 per game)
- Points total: 381 (27.21 per game)
- Top Scorer: Joe McKenna (7–12)
- Player of the Year: Pat Delaney
- All-Star Team: See here

The 1981 All-Ireland Senior Hurling Championship was the 95th staging of the All-Ireland Senior Hurling Championship, the Gaelic Athletic Association's premier inter-county hurling tournament. The draw for the 1981 fixtures took place in September 1980. The championship began on 24 May 1981 and ended on 6 September 1981.

Galway were the defending champions but were defeated by Offaly in the final. Westmeath re-entered the Leinster Championship after a three-year absence.

On 6 September 1981, Offaly won the championship following a 2–12 to 0–15 defeat of Galway in the All-Ireland final. This was their first All-Ireland title ever.

Limerick's Joe McKenna was the championship's top scorer with 7–12. Offaly's Pat Delaney was the choice for Texaco Hurler of the Year.

== Team changes ==
=== To Championship ===
Promoted from the All-Ireland Senior B Hurling Championship

- Antrim
- Westmeath

=== From Championship ===
Relegated to the All-Ireland Senior B Hurling Championship

- Kildare

== Teams ==
=== General information ===
Thirteen counties will compete in the All-Ireland Senior Hurling Championship: one team from the Connacht Senior Hurling Championship, six teams in the Leinster Senior Hurling Championship, five teams in the Munster Senior Hurling Championship and one team from the All-Ireland Senior B Hurling Championship.

County	Last provincial title	Last championship title	Position in 1980 Championship	Current championship
Antrim	1946	—		All-Ireland Senior B Hurling Championship
Clare	1932	1914		Munster Senior Hurling Championship
Cork	1979	1978		Munster Senior Hurling Championship
Dublin	1961	1938		Leinster Senior Hurling Championship
Galway	1922	1980		Leinster Senior Hurling Championship
Kilkenny	1979	1979		Leinster Senior Hurling Championship
Laois	1949	1915		Leinster Senior Hurling Championship
Limerick	1980	1973		Munster Senior Hurling Championship
Offaly	1980	—		Leinster Senior Hurling Championship
Tipperary	1971	1971		Munster Senior Hurling Championship
Waterford	1963	1959		Munster Senior Hurling Championship
Westmeath	—	—		Leinster Senior Hurling Championship
Wexford	1977	1968		Leinster Senior Hurling Championship

== Provincial championships ==
=== Leinster Senior Hurling Championship ===
Quarter-finals

24 May 1981 Quarter-final	Wexford	2–20 – 0–8	Dublin	Wexford Park, Wexford
	T. Doran (1–5), M. Quigley (1–3), M. Casey (0–3), N. Buggy (0–3), M. Jacob (0–2), J. Murphy (0–2), G. O'Connor (0–2), J. Fleming (0–1).		G. Hayes (0–6), L. Hennebery (0–1).	Referee: J Rankins (Laois)

7 June 1981 Quarter-final	Laois	1–16 – 1–10	Westmeath	Croke Park, Dublin
	M. Brophy (0–9), P. Critchley (1–0), M. Cuddy (0–2), M. Walsh (0–2), M. Cuddy (0–2), P. J. Cuddy (0–1), B. Bohane (0–1), C. Jones (0–1).		J. J. Lynch (1–3), J. Leonard (0–1), G. Jackson (0–1), P. Dalton (0–1), P. Curran (0–1), M. Cosgrave (0–1), D. Kilcoyne (0–1), M. Ryan (0–1).	Attendance: 4,834; Referee: M Kelleher (Kildare)

Semi-finals

21 June 1981 Semi-final	Offaly	3–20 – 6–10	Laois	Croke Park, Dublin
	P. Horan (2–2), M. Corrigan (1–5), P. Carroll (0–5), L. Currams (0–2), P. Kirwan (0–2), J. Flaherty (0–1), B. Bermingham (0–1).		B. Bohane (2–3), C. Jones (2–0), P. J. Cuddy (1–2), M. Cuddy (1–1), M. Walsh (0–3), M. Brophy (0–1).	Attendance: 31,299; Referee: J Denton (Wexford)

21 June 1981 Semi-final	Wexford	4–12 – 1–18	Kilkenny	Croke Park, Dublin
	J. Fleming (0–5), T. Doran (1–1), S. Kinsella (1–1), G. O'Connor (1–1), M. Quigley (1–0), M. Casey (0–2), N. Buggy (0–1), P. Courtney (0–1).		B. Fitzpatrick (0–8), C. Brennan (0–4), G. Fennelly (0–4), L. Fennelly (1–0), M. Ruth (0–1), C. Heffernan (0–1).	Attendance: 31,299; Referee: N O'Donoghue (Dublin)

Final

12 July 1981 Final	Offaly	3–12 – 2–13	Wexford	Croke Park, Dublin
	P. Horan (2–3), J. Flaherty (1–2), P. Delaney (0–2), L. Currams (0–2), P. Kirwan (0–2), P. Carroll (0–1).		S. Kinsella (1–2), G. O'Connor (0–5), C. Doran (1–0), N. Buggy (0–3), M. Jacob (0–2), J. Murphy (0–1).	Attendance: 29,053; Referee: N O'Donoghue (Dublin)

=== Munster Senior Hurling Championship ===
Quarter-final

24 May 1981 Quarter-final	Clare	3–14 – 2–14	Waterford	Semple Stadium, Thurles
	D. Coote (1–3), L. Quinlan (1–3), N. Ryan (1–0), J. Callinan (0–3), C. Honan (0–2), G. McInerney (0–1), S. Heaslip (0–1), A. Nugent (0–1).		J. Greene (1–1), S. Breen (1–0), M. Walsh (0–3), P. Curran (0–2), T. Casey (0–2), J. Hennebry (0–1), P. Daly (0–1), T. Maher (0–1), N. Connors (0–1), L. O'Brien (0–1), P. McGrath (0–1).	Attendance: 8,000; Referee: G Ryan (Tipperary)

Semi-finals

7 June 1981 Semi-final	Tipperary	3–13 – 4–10	Limerick	Semple Stadium, Thurles
	J. Grogan (2–6), P. Queally (1–1), E. O'Shea (0–3), P. Fox (0–1), M. Carroll (0–1), K. Fox (0–1).		J. McKenna (3–1), E. Cregan (0–4), B. Carroll (1–0), J. Flanagan (0–3), P. Kelly (0–1), G. McMahon (0–1).	Attendance: 16,500; Referee: N Dalton (Waterford)

14 June 1981 Semi-final	Clare	2–15 – 2–13	Cork	Semple Stadium, Thurles
	E. O'Connor (1–2), L. Quinlan (1–0), D. Coote (0–3), N. Ryan (0–2), M. Meehan (0–2), J. Callinan (0–3), A. Nugent (0–2), G. McInerney (0–1).		J. Barry-Murphy (1–1), T. Crowley (1–1), E. O'Donoghue (0–3), P. Horgan (0–3), J. Fenton (0–2), S. O'Leary (0–1), P. Moylan (0–1), J. Horgan (0–1).	Referee: G Ryan (Tipperary)

21 June 1981 Semi-final replay	Limerick	3–17 – 2–12	Tipperary	Gaelic Grounds, Limerick
	J. McKenna (1–2), M. Grimes (0–4), P. Kelly (0–4), E. Cregan (1–0), J. Flanagan (1–0), W. Fitzmaurice (0–2), S. Foley (0–1).		S. Burke (2–3), E. O'Shea (0–2), J. Grogan (0–2), J. O'Dwyer (0–1), P. Fox (0–1), P. Queally (0–1), G. O'Brien (0–1), D. Cahill (0–1).	Attendance: 29,299; Referee: JJ Landers (Waterford)

Final

5 July 1981 Final	Limerick	3–12 – 2–9	Clare	Semple Stadium, Thurles
	J. McKenna (3–3), E. Cregan (0–4), J. Flanagan (0–2), J. Carroll (0–1), L. O'Donoghue (0–1).		G. McInerney (1–0), N. Ryan (1–0), D. Coote (0–2), J. Callinan (0–2), C. Honan (0–1), E. O'Connor (0–1), L. Quinlan (0–1).	Attendance: 40,205; Referee: G Ryan (Tipperary)

== All-Ireland Senior Hurling Championship ==
Quarter-finals		Semi-finals		Final
Galway	6–23
Antrim	3–11	Limerick	0–11, 2–17
		Galway	1–08, 4–16
				Galway	0–15
				Offaly	2–12

=== All-Ireland quarter-finals ===
19 July 1981 Quarter-final	Galway	6–23 – 3–11	Antrim	Croke Park, Dublin
	B. Forde (2–5), N. Lane (1–6), F. Gantley (2–0), Joe Connolly (1–3), P. J. Molloy (0–4), S. Mahon (0–2), B. Lynskey (0–1), S. Silke (0–1), I. Clarke (0–1).		D. Donnelly (1–4), M. O'Connell (1–3), B. Laverty (1–0), S. Donnelly (0–3), P. McFaul (0–1).	Attendance: 4,615; Referee: M Kelliher (Kildare)

=== All-Ireland semi-finals ===
2 August 1981 Semi-final	Galway	1–8 – 0–11	Limerick	Croke Park, Dublin
	B. Lynskey (1–0), Joe Connolly (0–3), F. Gantley (0–2), S. Linnane (0–1), I. Clarke (0–1), S. Mahon (0–1).		E. Cregan (0–5), J. McKenna (0–2), F. Nolan (0–1), L. O'Donoghue (0–1), O. O'Connor (0–1), J. Flanagan (0–1).	Attendance: 34,783; Referee: N O'Donoghue (Dublin)

16 August 1981 Semi-final replay	Galway	4–16 – 2–17	Limerick	Croke Park, Dublin
	Joe Connolly (2–7), John Connolly (1–2), P. J. Molloy (1–0), N. Lane (0–3), I. Clarke (0–2), B. Forde (0–1), S. Mahon (0–1).		E. Cregan (1–5), J. McKenna (0–4), B. Carroll (1–0), W. Fitzmaurice (0–2), F. Nolan (0–1), L. Enright (0–1), J. Carroll (0–1), P. Foley (0–1), M. Grimes (0–1), O. O'Connor (0–1).	Attendance: 42,666; Referee: N O'Donoghue (Dublin)

=== All-Ireland Final ===
6 September 1981 Final	Offaly	2–12 – 0–15	Galway	Croke Park, Dublin
	P. Delaney (0–5), P. Carroll (1–1), J. Flaherty (1–1), L. Currams (0–2), P. Horan (0–2), D. Owens (0–1).		J. Connolly (0–8), N. Lane (0–3), S. Mahon (0–2), P. J. Molloy (0–1), M. Connolly (0–1).	Attendance: 71,348; Referee: F Murphy (Cork)

== Scoring statistics ==
Top scorers overall

Rank	Player	County	Tally	Total	Matches	Average
1	Joe McKenna	Limerick	7–12	33	5	6.60
2	Joe Connolly	Galway	3–21	30	4	7.50
3	Éamonn Cregan	Limerick	2–18	24	5	4.80
4	Pádraig Horan	Offaly	4-07	19	3	6.33
5	Noel Lane	Galway	1–12	15	4	3.75
6	John Grogan	Tipperary	2–08	14	2	7.00
7	Bernie Forde	Galway	2–06	12	4	3.00
7	Tony Doran	Wexford	2–06	12	3	4.00
9	George O'Connor	Wexford	1-08	11	3	3.66
9	Declan Coote	Clare	1-08	11	3	3.66

Top scorers in a single game

Rank	Player	County	Tally	Total	Opposition
1	Joe Connolly	Galway	2–07	13	Limerick
2	Joe McKenna	Limerick	3–03	12	Clare
2	John Grogan	Tipperary	2–06	12	Limerick
4	Bernie Forde	Galway	2–05	11	Antrim
5	Joe McKenna	Limerick	3–01	10	Tipperary
6	Billy Bohane	Laois	2–03	9	Offaly
6	Pádraig Horan	Offaly	2–03	9	Wexford
6	Séamus Bourke	Tipperary	2–03	9	Limerick
6	Noel Lane	Galway	1–06	9	Antrim
6	Martin Brophy	Laois	0–09	9	Westmeath

== Broadcasting ==
The following matches were broadcast live on television in Ireland on RTÉ.

Round	RTÉ
All-Ireland semi-final	Limerick vs Galway
All-Ireland final	Offaly vs Galway

== Sources ==
- Corry, Eoghan, The GAA Book of Lists (Hodder Headline Ireland, 2005).
- Donegan, Des, The Complete Handbook of Gaelic Games (DBA Publications Limited, 2005).
