= Kinnitty GAA =

Hurling club in County Offaly, Ireland

Kinnitty
- Cionn Eitigh
- Founded: 1887
- County: Offaly
- Colours
- Grounds: St Finian's Park

Playing kits
Standard colours

Senior Club Championships
	All Ireland	Leinster champions	Offaly champions
Hurling:	0	0	9

Kinnitty GAA is a Gaelic Athletic Association club in Kinnitty, County Offaly, Ireland. The club is affiliated to the Offaly County Board and is exclusively concerned with the game of hurling.

== History ==
Located in the village of Kinnitty, close to the Offaly–Laois border, Kinnitty GAA Club was founded in 1887. It was one of three teams in existence in the parish in the early years of the Gaelic Athletic Association, with Roscomroe and Cadamstown also fielding teams. Kinnitty contested their first Offaly SHC final in 1897, however, it was 1920 before the club claimed its first Offaly SHC title.

Further Offaly SHC titles followed in 1923 and 1930, however, the club would have to wait until 1967 for their fourth Offaly SHC title. That success ushered in a new era of success, with Kinnitty contesting 13 finals between 1967 and 1985. The club's greatest era of dominance resulted in back-to-back Offaly SHC title wins in 1978 and 1979, followed by thre successive titles between 1983 and 1985. Kinnitty's last final appearance was a 1–15 to 0–15 defeat by Birr in 2008.

== Honours ==
- Offaly Senior Hurling Championship (9): 1920, 1923, 1930, 1967, 1978, 1979, 1983, 1984, 1985
- Offaly Junior A Hurling Championship (7): 1916, 1917, 1966, 1986, 1993, 2000, 2020

== Notable hurlers ==
- Ger Coughlan: All-Ireland SHC-winner (1981, 1985)
- Mark Corrigan: All-Ireland SHC-winner (1981, 1985)
- Pat Delaney: All-Ireland SHC-winner (1981, 1985)
- Johnny Flaherty: All-Ireland SHC-winner (1981)
