= St Brendan's Park =

Gaelic sports stadium in Ireland

- Páirc Naoimh Breandáin
- Location within Ireland
- Location: Birr, County Offaly, Ireland
- Coordinates: 53°5′29.14″N 7°54′31.01″W
- Public transit: Emmet Square bus stop
- Owner: Offaly GAA
- Capacity: 8,800
- Surface: Grass

St Brendan's Park (Irish: Páirc Naoimh Breandáin), known for sponsorship reasons as Grant Heating St. Brendan's Park, is a GAA stadium in Birr, County Offaly, Ireland. It is one of the main grounds of Offaly's Gaelic football and hurling teams. The ground has a capacity of 8,800. Prior to the development of O'Connor Park in Tullamore, the ground was the base of Offaly hurling and played host to intercounty competitions and to the Offaly hurling county final. Most Offaly games have since transferred to Tullamore. The stadium is named for the local patron saint Brendan of Birr (d. c. AD 572), not to be confused with the more famous Brendan the Navigator (d. c. AD 577).

Saint Brendan's Park is the home ground of the town’s GAA club. It is located on the south side of the town on Railway Road.

The site was also the venue of the 1971 All-Ireland Senior Hurling Championship semi-final between Tipperary and Galway. 15,022 crammed into the venue to watch Tipperary see off Galway in a high scoring match. St Brendan's Park is also located close to the site of the venue of the first All- Ireland Hurling Final which was between Thurles representing Tipperary and Meelick representing Galway in 1887.

== See also ==
- List of Gaelic Athletic Association stadiums
- List of stadiums in Ireland by capacity
