= 1896 Offaly Senior Hurling Championship =

Annual hurling competition season

- Champions: Killoughey (1st title); John Scully (captain)
- Runners-up: Rahan

The 1896 Offaly Senior Hurling Championship was the inaugural staging of the Offaly Senior Hurling Championship since its establishment by the Offaly County Board.

The final was played on 30 August 1896 at the Clara Grounds, between Killoughey and Rahan. Killoughey won the match by 2–05 to 1–00 to claim their first ever championship title.

== Results ==
=== Final ===
30 August 1896 Final	Killoughey	2-05 - 1-00	Rahan	Clara Grounds
