= Coolderry GAA =

Gaelic games club in County Offaly, Ireland

Coolderry
- Cúl Doire
- Founded: 1880
- County: Offaly
- Colours
- Grounds: Coolderry GAA Grounds
- Coordinates: 53°05′29.32″N 7°50′27.76″W

Playing kits
Standard colours

Senior Club Championships
	All Ireland	Leinster champions	Offaly champions
Hurling:	0	1	31

Coolderry GAA is a Gaelic Athletic Association club in Coolderry, County Offaly, Ireland. The club is affiliated to the Offaly County Board and is exclusively concerned with the game of hurling.

== History ==
Located in the village of Coolderry, close to the Offaly–Tipperary border, Coolderry GAA Club can trace it's origins back to the years just before the foundation of the Gaelic Athletic Association in 1884. Their first victory was recorded in 1890 when the club received a trophy from the Council of the Kings & Queens County GAA for a hurling championship played that year.

Coolderry quickly became the dominant team in hurling in Offaly. The club won 11 Offaly SHC titles, without losing a final, between 1899 and 1917. A relatively fallow period followed, however, Coolderry claimed further Offaly SHC titles in 1926, 1931 and 1939. The club once again returned as a dominant force and collected nine Offaly SHC titles from 14 final appearances in the 21-year period between 1942 and 1963.

After winning their 26th Offaly SHC title with a defeat of St Rynagh's in 1986, Coolderry waited 18 years before claiming the title once more in 2004. Coolderry beat Oulart–The Ballagh by 1–15 to 1–11 to win the Leinster Club SHC title in 2011. They later faced defeat by Loughgiel Shamrocks in the 2012 All-Ireland Club SHC final. This was followed by further Offaly SHC title wins in 2015 and 2018.

== Honours ==
- Leinster Senior Club Hurling Championship (1): 2011
- Offaly Senior Hurling Championship (31): 1899, 1901, 1903, 1904, 1905, 1906, 1910, 1911, 1914, 1916, 1917, 1926, 1931, 1939, 1942, 1945, 1947, 1949, 1953, 1956, 1961, 1962, 1963, 1977, 1980, 1986, 2004, 2010, 2011, 2015, 2018
- Offaly Intermediate Hurling Championship (6): 1985, 1986, 1988, 2001, 2005, 2024
- Offaly Junior A Hurling Championship (6) 1908, 1909, 1913, 1914, 1918, 1931

== Notable hurlers ==
- Pat Carroll: All-Ireland SHC-winner (1981, 1985)
- John Miller: All-Ireland SHC-winner (1994)
- Pat O'Connor: All-Ireland SHC-winner (1994)
