= Pad Joe Whelehan =

Irish hurler and manager

Pad Joe Whelahan
Personal information
- Native name: Pádraig Seosamh Ó Faoileacháin (Irish)
- Born: Banagher, County Offaly

Sport
- Sport: Hurling
- Position: Forward
Club
- Years: Club
- St Rynagh's
Club titles
- Offaly titles: 10
- Leinster titles: 2
Inter-county
- Years: County
- 1965–1978: Offaly
Inter-county titles
- Leinster titles: 0
- All-Irelands: 0
- NHL: 1 (Division 2)

Patrick Joseph Whelahan (born 1945), better known as Pad Joe Whelahan, is an Irish hurling manager and former player. He played hurling with his local club St Rynagh's and with the Offaly senior inter-county team in the 1960s and 1970s. Whelahan later served as manager of the Offaly and Limerick senior inter-county teams. He has also had a very successful career as manager of club sides Birr and Toomevara.

== Early and private life ==
Pad Joe Whelahan was born in Banagher, County Offaly in 1945. He was educated locally and later settled in Birr where he runs his own pub. Whelahan's sons – Brian, Simon and Barry – would all experience success with Birr and with Offaly on the inter-county scene.

== Playing career ==
=== Club ===
Whelahan played his club hurling with his local St Rynagh's club in Banagher and enjoyed much success. He won his first of his ten senior county titles in 1965. Whelahan added further county honours to his collection in 1966, 1968, 1969, 1970, 1972, 1973, 1974, 1975 and 1976. 1970 saw St Rynagh's convert their county title into a Leinster club title, however, the team was later defeated in the All-Ireland final by Roscrea. Whelahan captured a second Leinster club medal in 1972; however, Glen Rovers accounted for the Offaly side in the All-Ireland final once again.

=== Inter-county ===
Whelahan also lined out at various levels with his native Offaly. He spent thirteen years with the senior inter-county team; however, it was a time when Offaly hurling was unfashionable and Whelahan never had any major success. He did win a National Hurling League Division 2 medal following a victory over Antrim.

=== Inter-provincial ===
Whelehan also lined out with Leinster in the Railway Cup inter-provincial competition; however, he also had little success in this hurling competition.

== Managerial career ==
Pad Joe Whelahan
Sport
Club management
- Years: Club
- St Rynaghs; Toomevara; Nenagh Éire Óg; Birr
	6	5	3
Inter-county management
- Years: Team
- 2003–2005: Limerick

=== Club ===
After his playing career came to an end Whelahan maintained a keen interest in the game of hurling as a coach and manager. He managed his native club of St Rynagh's to county honours, before later guiding Toomevara and Nenagh Éire Óg to club honours in Tipperary as well.

It was with Birr that Whelahan enjoyed his biggest successes. He took charge of his adopted club side in 1997 and steered Birr to a county title. Leinster club honours quickly followed before Birr captured the All-Ireland club title in 1998. The following year Whelahan's side captured the first of five county titles in-a-row. During this very successful period Birr also captured Leinster club honours in 1999, 2001 and 2002. These provincial titles were converted into All-Ireland wins in 2002 and 2003. Whelahan resigned as Birr manager after the club failed to win a sixth county title in-a-row in 2004. He later returned to guide the club to further county and Leinster honours in 2007. His side were later defeated by Portumna in the All-Ireland final in 2008.

=== Inter-county ===
At county level Whelahan was one of the most successful minor hurling managers of them all, leading Offaly to All-Ireland titles in 1986, 1987 and 1989. He also took charge of the county under-21 and senior sides. Whelahan guided the senior team to several Leinster titles in the late 1980s.

Whelahan served as manager of the Limerick senior inter-county team between 2003 and 2005; however, he had little success as Limerick failed to win a championship game. He has also been linked to vacant managerial positions in Antrim, Westmeath, Offaly and Dublin.

== Honours ==
=== Player ===
St Rynagh's

- Leinster Senior Club Hurling Championship (2): 1970, 1972
- Offaly Senior Hurling Championship (10): 1965, 1966, 1968, 1969, 1970, 1972, 1973, 1974, 1975 (c), 1976

=== Management ===
St Rynagh's

- Offaly Senior Hurling Championship (1): 1990

Toomevara

- Tipperary Senior Hurling Championship (1): 1992

Nenagh Éire Óg

- Tipperary Senior Hurling Championship (1): 1995

Birr

- All-Ireland Senior Club Hurling Championship (3): 1998, 2002, 2003
- Leinster Senior Club Hurling Championship (5): 1997, 1999, 2001, 2002, 2007
- Offaly Senior Hurling Championship (8): 1997, 1999, 2000, 2001, 2002, 2003, 2007, 2008
- Offaly Intermediate Hurling Championship (4): 1997, 1998, 1999, 2007

Offaly

- Leinster Senior Hurling Championship (1): 1989
- Leinster Under-21 Hurling Championship (1): 1989
- All-Ireland Minor Hurling Championship (3): 1986, 1987, 1989
- Leinster Minor Hurling Championship (3): 1986, 1987, 1989

Achievements
Preceded by Pat Nally	All-Ireland Club SHC winning manager 2002–2003	Succeeded by Patsy Morrissey
Sporting positions
Preceded by Dave Keane	Limerick senior hurling team manager 2003–2005	Succeeded by Joe McKenna
