= Pádraig Horan =

Irish hurler and Gaelic footballer (1950–2026)

Personal information
- Native name: Pádraig Ó hÓdhráin (Irish)
- Born: 21 April 1950 Shannon Harbour, County Offaly, Ireland
- Died: 12 August 2026 (aged 76) Dublin, Ireland
- Occupation: Secondary school teacher
- Height: 5 ft 11 in (180 cm)

Sport
- Sport: Hurling
- Position: Full-forward
Club
- Years: Club
- 1968–1986: St Rynagh's
Club titles
- Offaly titles: 10
- Leinster titles: 3
Inter-county
Years	County	Apps (scores)
1969–1986	Offaly	42 (15–66)
Inter-county titles
- Leinster titles: 4
- All-Irelands: 2
- NHL: 0
- All Stars: 1

Pádraig Horan (21 April 1950 – 12 August 2026) was an Irish hurler. He played with St Rynagh's at club level and was the captain of the Offaly team that won the 1981 All-Ireland SHC title. Horan is considered one of the greatest Offaly players of all time.

As a dual player, Horan played both hurling and Gaelic football for St Rynagh's during an 18-year tenure, winning 10 Offaly SHC titles and three Leinster Club SHC titles. He was an All-Ireland Club SHC runner-up on three occasions.

Horan made his Offaly debut in 1969, at the age of 18; he went on to lift the Liam MacCarthy Cup in 1981, in what was Offaly's inaugural All-Ireland SHC triumph. He made a total of 151 appearances for Offaly, during which time he also won four Leinster SHC titles and a second All-Ireland SHC medal. An All Star-winner in 1985, Horan was inducted to the GAA Hall of Fame in 2017.

In retirement from playing, Horan became involved in team management and coaching. He coached St Brendan's Community School to the Dr Croke Cup in 1986, while he later managed Birr to the All-Ireland Club SHC title in 1995. Horan was also involved as manager and coach at inter-county level with Laois and Kildare, while he managed Offaly to their sole National Hurling League title in 1991.

== Club career ==
Horan began his club career at juvenile and underage levels as a dual player with the St Rynagh's club. He captained the club's minor team to the Offaly MFC title in 1968, following a win over Tullamore in the final. Horan also made his senior team debut that year, and won his first Offaly SHC medal after a 1–12 to 3–04 win over Coolderry in the final. It was the first of three successive titles for Horan and St Rynagh's. The third of these titles was subsequently converted into Horan's first Leinster Club SHC, however, St Rynagh's were later beaten by Roscrea in the 1971 All-Ireland Club SHC final.

St Rynagh's won a record five consecutive Offaly SHC titles between 1972 and 1976, with Horan captaining the team to a 1–11 to 2–03 win over Birr in the 1974 Offaly SHC final. He had earlier won a second Leinster Club SHC medal, however, St Rynagh's had a ten-point defeat by Glen Rovers in the 1973 All-Ireland Club SHC final.

Horan brought his Offaly SHC medal tally to ten, after winning consecutive titles in 1981, as captain, and 1982. A 1–16 to 2–10 defeat of Buffers Alley secured his third Leinster Club SHC medal in 1982, however, for the third time in his club career he faced All-Ireland Club SHC defeat when Loughgiel Shamrocks beat St Rynagh's in a replay. Horan brought his 18-year club career to an end with a Gaelic football success, after winning an Offaly IFC title in 1986.

== Inter-county career ==
Horan first appeared on the inter-county scene for Offaly during a three-year tenure with the minor team between 1966 and 1968. This was followed by four consecutive years with the under-21 team. The last two years in the under-21 grade saw Horan line out as a dual player and he won a Leinster U21FC medal in 1971.

Horan made his Offaly senior hurling team debut in a 6–07 to 2–05 National Hurling League defeat by Kilkenny in March 1969. He briefly lined out with the Offaly senior football team and was an O'Byrne Cup-winner in 1971, however, he subsequently committed solely to the hurling team and was a regular member of the team as a defender throughout the 1970s.

Horan was team captain in 1980 when Offaly won their very first Leinster SHC, following a 3–17 to 5–10 win over Kilkenny in the final. He later found out that his father had died at home while listening to the match on the radio. Horan retained the captaincy the following year as Offaly retained the provincial title with a 3–12 to 2–13 win over Wexford. He won his first All-Ireland SHC medal in September 1981, after captaining Offaly to their inaugural title following a 2–12 to 0–15 defeat of Galway in the final. Horan was also Offaly's top scorer throughout the championship with 4–07.

After consecutive Leinster SHC final defeats, Offaly reclaimed the title in 1984, with Horan collecting his third winners' medal after the one-point win over Wexford. He later lined out at full-forward in Offaly's 3–16 to 1–12 defeat by Cork in the 1984 All-Ireland SHC final in Semple Stadium. Horan decided to retire from inter-county hurling following this defeat and even put his wishes in writing in a letter to the Offaly County Board, however, he was persuaded to change his mind by teammate Pat Carroll. His change of mind was a successful one, with Horan collecting his fourth Leinster SHC medal in 1985, following a 5–15 to 0–17 win over Laois. He won his second All-Ireland SHC medal in September 1985, after scoring three points in the 2–11 to 1–12 defeat of Galway in the 1985 All-Ireland SHC final. Horan ended the season by winning an All-Star. He made his last appearance for Offaly in a 4–10 to 1–11 defeat by Kilkenny in the 1986 Leinster SHC final.

== Inter-provincial career ==
Horan's performances at inter-county level resulted in his selection for the Leinster inter-provincital team. He won a Railway Cup medal in March 1973, after lining out at full-back in the 1–13 to 2–08 win over Munster in the final. It was the first of three successive Railway Cup medals for Horan.

== Managerial career ==
As a teacher, Horan was heavily involved in coaching hurling and Gaelic football at schools' level. As coach of the St Brendan's Community School senior hurling team, he guided the school to consecutive Leinster Colleges SAHC titles in 1985 and 1986, before winning the Dr Croke Cup title after a 5–08 to 1–08 win over the North Monastery in the final.

Horan was appointed Offaly senior hurling team manager in October 1990. His appointment also saw him simultaneously take charge of Offaly's under-21 team. Horan took Offaly to their sole National Hurling League title success in his first season in charge of the seniors. He also guided the under-21s to consecutive Leinster U21HC titles in 1991 and 1992.

Horan's next managerial appointment was at club level when he took charge of Birr. He guided the club to the Offaly SHC title in his first season in 1994, following an 0–08 to 0–06 win over Seir Kieran in the final. This was later followed by the Leinster Club SHC title, before Horan's Birr beat Dunloy by 3–13 to 2–03 to win the All-Ireland Club SHC title following a replay.

In November 1996, Horan returned to inter-county activity when he was appointed coach and trainer of the Kildare senior hurling team. He left this position after one year and succeeded Babs Keating as manager of the Laois senior hurling team in July 1997. Horan resigned in March 2000 following a number of disappointing results and the refusal to play in the National Hurling League by several high profile players.

A return to club management soon followed, with Horan being appointed manager of the St Rynagh's senior team. He guided the team to an 0–11 to 0–10 defeat by Birr in the 2001 Offaly SHC final. Horan resigned as manager in 2003, however, he returned for one more unsuccessful tenure in 2006.

Horan returned to inter-county management in February 2007 when he was appointed manager of Offaly's under-21 team for the second time. His tenure in charge saw Offaly lose consecutive Leinster U21HC finals to Dublin and Kilkenny respectively.

== Personal life and death ==
Born in Shannon Harbour, County Offaly, Horan's family moved to Balliver near Banagher during his childhood. After attending Shannon Harbour NS, St Rynagh's NS and Banagher Vocational School, he trained as a fitter with Bord na Móna. Horan qualified as a metalwork and technical drawing teacher in 1973. His first teaching post was in Limerick, and seven years later he took up a position in St Brendan's Community School in Birr.

Horan stood unsuccessfully as the Fine Gael candidate in the 1984 Laois–Offaly by-election, coming second to Brian Cowen. He took a career break from teaching in 1987 and moved to San Francisco, where he worked in the construction industry, before returning to Birr in 1990. He retired from his teaching career in 2009. Horan's sons, Cathal and Diarmuid, also played hurling with Offaly.

Horan died on 12 August 2026, at the age of 76.

== Honours ==
=== Player ===
St Rynagh's

- Leinster Senior Club Hurling Championship (3): 1970, 1973, 1982
- Offaly Senior Hurling Championship (10): 1968, 1969, 1970, 1972, 1973, 1974 (c), 1975, 1976, 1981 (c), 1982
- Offaly Intermediate Football Championship (1): 1986
- Offaly Minor Football Championship (1): 1968 (c)

Offaly

- All-Ireland Senior Hurling Championship (2): 1981 (c), 1985
- Leinster Senior Hurling Championship (4): 1980, 1981 (c), 1984, 1985
- O'Byrne Cup (1): 1971
- Leinster Under-21 Football Championship (1): 1971

Leinster

- Railway Cup (3): 1973, 1974, 1975

Awards

- All Stars Award (1): 1985
- GAA Hall of Fame Inductee: 2017

=== Management ===
St Brendan's Community School

- All-Ireland Colleges Senior A Hurling Championship (1): 1986
- Leinster Colleges Senior A Hurling Championship (2): 1985, 1986

St Rynagh's

- Offaly Intermediate Football Championship (1): 2010

Birr

- All-Ireland Senior Club Hurling Championship (1): 1995
- Leinster Senior Club Hurling Championship (1): 1994
- Offaly Senior Hurling Championship (1): 1994

Offaly

- National Hurling League (1): 1990–91
- Leinster Under-21 Hurling Championship (2): 1991, 1992

Achievements
Preceded by Joe Connolly	All-Ireland SHC final winning captain 1981	Succeeded by Brian Cody
Sporting positions
Preceded by	Offaly senior hurling team captain 1980–1981	Succeeded by Pat Carroll
Preceded by Paudge Mulhare	Offaly senior hurling team manager 1990–1992	Succeeded by Éamonn Cregan
Preceded by Babs Keating	Laois senior hurling team manager 1997–2000	Succeeded by Seán Cuddy
Preceded by Declan Pilkington	Offaly under-21 hurling team manager 2007–2009	Succeeded by Stephen Byrne
