= Barry Whelahan =

Irish hurler

Personal information
- Native name: Barra Ó Faoileacháin (Irish)
- Born: 1977 (age 48–49) Birr, County Offaly, Ireland
- Occupation: Publican

Sport
- Sport: Hurling
- Position: Wing-back
Club
- Years: Club
- Birr
Club titles
- Offaly titles: 10
- Leinster titles: 5
- All-Ireland Titles: 3
Inter-county*
Years	County	Apps (scores)
1998–2005	Offaly	23 (0–11)
Inter-county titles
- Leinster titles: 0
- All-Irelands: 1
- NHL: 0
- All Stars: 0
- *Inter County team apps and scores correct as of 15:35, 17 November 2024.

Barry Whelahan (born 1977) is an Irish hurling manager and former player. At club level he played with Birr and was also a member of the Offaly senior hurling team.

Whelahan had a successful career across various levels. A three-time All-Ireland Club SHC-winner with Birr, he lined out in all grades at inter-county level with Offaly. Whelahan, along with his brothers Brian and Simon, was part of the Offaly senior team that won the All-Ireland SHC title in 1998.

Whelahan has also managed the Offaly camogie team. In January 2024, it was reported that Whelahan had joined the Laois senior camogie management team as a coach.

== Honours ==
Birr

- All-Ireland Senior Club Hurling Championship: 1998, 2002, 2003
- Leinster Senior Club Hurling Championship: 1991, 1994 1997, 1999, 2001, 2002, 2007
- Offaly Senior Hurling Championship: 1997, 1999, 2000, 2001, 2002, 2003, 2005, 2006, 2007, 2008

Offaly

- All-Ireland Senior Hurling Championship: 1998
