= Frank Whelehan =

Irish hurler

Personal information
- Native name: Prionsias Ó Faoileacháin (Irish)
- Born: Banagher, County Offaly, Ireland

Sport
- Sport: Hurling
- Position: Full-back
Club
- Years: Club
- St Rynagh's
Club titles
- Leinster titles: 2
Inter-county*
Years	County	Apps (scores)
1971–1972	Offaly	1 (0-00)
Inter-county titles
- Leinster titles: 0
- All-Irelands: 0
- NHL: 0
- All Stars: 0
- *Inter County team apps and scores correct as of 17:16, 30 June 2014.

Frank Whelehan is an Irish former hurler who played as a full-back for the Offaly senior team.

Born in Banagher, County Offaly, Whelehan first played competitive hurling in his youth. He made his senior debut with Offaly during the 1971–72 National League and immediately became a regular member of the team. During his brief career he experienced little success.

At club level Whelehan is a two-time Leinster medallist with St Rynagh's. He also won numerous championship medals with the club.

His retirement came following the conclusion of the 192 championship.

Whelehan's brother, Pad Joe, and his nephews, Barry, Brian and Simon, all enjoyed lengthy careers with Offaly.

== Honours ==
=== Team ===
St Rynagh's

- Leinster Senior Club Hurling Championship (2): 1970, 1972
