= Hanniffy =

Hanniffy is a surname. Notable people with the surname include:

- Darren Hanniffy (born 1978), Irish hurler, brother of Gary and Rory
- Gary Hanniffy (born 1977), Irish hurler
- Rory Hanniffy (born 1982), Irish hurler
