= Ballyskenagh/Killavilla GAA =

Ballyskenagh/Killavilla
- Baile Sceannach/Cill an Bhile
- Founded: 2013
- County: Offaly
- Nickname: BK
- Colours: Red, green and black
- Grounds: Streamstown

Playing kits
Standard colours

Senior Club Championships
	All Ireland	Leinster champions	Offaly champions
Hurling:	0	0	0

Ballyskenagh/Killavilla GAA is a Gaelic Athletic Association club located near Roscrea, County Tipperary, Ireland but affiliated to the Offaly County Board. The club is primarily concerned with the game of hurling, but also fields teams in Gaelic football.

== History ==
Associated with the parish of Roscrea, County Tipperary but geographically situated in County Offaly, the club was formed in March 2013 following an amalgamation between the existing Ballyskenagh and Killavilla clubs. The club has spent its existence competing in the IHC and Offaly JAHC. The club fielded a Gaelic football team for the first time in 2023, while also amalgamating with Shinrone at underage level to win the Offaly MAHC title that year.

== Honours ==
- Offaly Minor A Hurling Championship (1): 2023

== Notable players ==
- David Franks: All-Ireland SHC runner-up (2000)
- Brendan Murphy: All-Ireland SHC runner-up (2000)
- Luke Watkins: All-Ireland U20HC runner-up (2023)
