= Seán Moylan (hurler) =

Irish hurler

Personal information
- Native name: Seán Ó Maoileáin (Irish)
- Born: 14 May 1945 (age 81) Banagher, County Offaly, Ireland

Sport
- Sport: Hurling
- Position: Right wing-back
Club
- Years: Club
- St Rynagh's
Club titles
- Offaly titles: 10
- Leinster titles: 2
Inter-county*
Years	County	Apps (scores)
1971-1973	Offaly	3 (1-00)
Inter-county titles
- Leinster titles: 0
- All-Irelands: 0
- NHL: 0
- All Stars: 0
- *Inter County team apps and scores correct as of 19:16, 30 June 2014.

Seán Moylan is an Irish former hurler who played as a left wing-back for the Offaly senior team.

Born in Banagher, County Offaly, Moylan first played competitive hurling in his youth. He made his senior debut with Offaly during the 1971-72 National League and immediately became a regular member of the team. During his brief career he experienced little success.

At club level Moylan is a two-time Leinster medallist with St Rynagh's. He also won numerous championship medals with the club.

His retirement came following the conclusion of the 1973 championship.

Moylan's brothers Pat and Barney also had lengthy career playing for Offaly, Moylan's son Thomas also had a short spell with Offaly.

== Honours ==
St Rynagh's

- Leinster Senior Club Hurling Championship (2): 1970, 1972
