= Tom Conneely =

Irish hurler

Personal information
- Native name: Tomás Mac Conghaola (Irish)
- Born: 24 February 1959 (age 67) Banagher, County Offaly, Ireland
- Occupation: Fitter
- Height: 5 ft 9 in (175 cm)

Sport
- Sport: Hurling
- Position: Midfielder
Club
- Years: Club
- St Rynagh's
Club titles
- Offaly titles: 3
- Leinster titles: 1
Inter-county*
Years	County	Apps (scores)
1982-1986	Offaly	16 (0-6)
Inter-county titles
- Leinster titles: 2
- All-Irelands: 1
- NHL: 0
- All Stars: 0
- *Inter County team apps and scores correct as of 22:08, 30 June 2014.

Thomas Conneely (born 24 February 1959) is an Irish former hurler who played as a midfielder at senior level for the Offaly county team.

Born in Banagher, County Offaly, Connelly first played competitive hurling in his youth. He made his senior debut for Offaly during the 1979-80 National League and subsequently broke onto the starting fifteen. During his career Conneely won one All-Ireland medal and two Leinster medals. He was an All-Ireland runner-up on one occasion.

At club level Conneely is a one-time Leinster medallist with St Rynagh's. In addition to this he also won three championship medals. Conneelly later played with St Gabriel's.

Throughout his career Conneely made 16 championship appearances. He played his last game for Offaly during the 1986-87 National League.

In retirement from playing Conneely became involved in team management and coaching. He served as manager of the St Gabriel's intermediate hurling team.

== Playing career ==
=== Club ===
Conneely played his club hurling with St Rynagh's and experienced much success.

In 1981 he won his first championship medal following a defeat of Kinnitty. The club made it two-in-a-row in 1982, with Conneely winning a second championship medal. St Rymagh's subsequently reached the provincial decider, with Buffer's Alley providing the opposition. A 1-16 to 2-10 victory gave Conneely a Leinster medal. After a controversial semi-final defeat of Kiltormer, St Rynagh's reached the All-Ireland decider and faced Loughgiel Shamrocks. A superb display by Loughgiel goalkeeper Niall Patterson foiled Conneely's side. Pádraig Horan of St Rynagh's missed a late free to secure a win, as the game ended 2-5 to 1-8. The replay was more conclusive with goals by Brendan Laverty and Aidan McCarry giving Loughgiel a 2-12 to 1-12 victory.

St Rynagh's surrendered their titles the following year; however, Conneely won a third championship medal in 1987 following a defeat of Seir Kieran.

=== Inter-county ===
Conneely made his senior debut for Offaly on 18 November 1979 in a 2-9 to 3-4 National Hurling League defeat of Kilkenny. He was a regular played during the league campaigns over the next few years, and collected All-Ireland and Leinster medals as a non-paying substitute.

On 30 May 1982 Conneely made his championship debut in a narrow 2-16 to 3-12 Leinster quarter-final defeat of Wexford.

Conneely won his first Leinster medal on the field of play in 1984 following a 1-15 to 2-11 defeat of Wexford. The subsequent centenary year All-Ireland decider on 2 September 1984 saw Cork providing the opposition. In the first ever championship meeting between the two teams, Cork won with relative ease by 3-16 to 1-12 following second-half goals by Kevin Hennessy and Seánie O'Leary.

Offaly retained the provincial crown in 1985, with Conneely adding a second Leinster medal to his collection following a 5-15 to 0-17 trouncing of Laois. Galway provided the opposition in the subsequent All-Ireland final on 1 September 1985 and a tense game ensued. Pat Cleary scored the first goals of the day after twenty-six minutes of play and got his second less than half a minute after the restart. Joe Dooley had a goal disallowed halfway through the second-half while a long Joe Cooney effort, which seemed to cross the goal line, was not given. P. J. Molloy was Galway's goal scorer; however, the day belonged to Offaly. A 2-11 to 1-12 victory gave Conneely his first All-Ireland winners' medal on the field of play.

Conneely played his last game for Offaly on 12 October 1986 in a 2-7 to 2-13 defeat by Kilkenny in the National Hurling League.

== Honours ==
=== Player ===
St Rynagh's

- Leinster Senior Club Hurling Championship (1): 1982
- Offaly Senior Club Hurling Championship (3): 1981, 1982, 1987

Offaly

- All-Ireland Senior Hurling Championship (2): 1981 (sub), 1985
- Leinster Senior Hurling Championship (4): 1980 (sub), 1981 (sub), 1984, 1985
