= 1971 Offaly Senior Hurling Championship =

Annual hurling competition season

- Champions: Birr (10th title); Declan Hennessy (captain)
- Runners-up: St Rynagh's

The 1971 Offaly Senior Hurling Championship was the 74th staging of the Offaly Senior Hurling Championship since its establishment by the Offaly County Board in 1896.

St Rynagh's entered the championship as the defending champions.

The final was played on 28 November 1971 at St Brendan's Park in Birr, between Birr and St Rynagh's, in what was their first ever meeting in the final. Birr won the match by 2–10 to 2–09 to claim their 10th championship title overall and a first championship title in 23 years.

== Results ==
=== Final ===
28 November 1971 Final	Birr	2-10 - 2-09	St Rynagh's	St Brendan's Park
	D Hennessy 1-3, B Nevin 1-1 J Hernon 0-3, T O'Shea 0-1, P Goonan 0-1, M Loughnane 0-1.		B Moylan 1-9, P Mulhare 1-1.
