= 2003 Offaly Senior Hurling Championship =

Annual hurling competition season

- Dates: 3 May – 5 October 2003
- Teams: 13
- Champions: Birr (18th title); Niall Claffey (captain); Pad Joe Whelehan (manager)
- Runners-up: Ballyskenagh; David Franks (captain); Paddy Kirwan (manager)

The 2003 Offaly Senior Hurling Championship was the 106th staging of the Offaly Senior Hurling Championship since its establishment by the Offaly County Board in 1896. The draw for the group stage placings took place on 4 February 2003. The championship ran from 3 May to 5 October 2003.

Birr were the defending champions.

The final was played on 5 October 2003 at St Brendan's Park in Birr, between Birr and Ballyskenagh, in what was their first ever meeting in the final. Birr won the match by 1–18 to 1–11 to claim their 18th championship title overall and a fourth title in succession.

== Results ==
=== Quarter-finals ===
31 August 2003 Quarter-final	Kinnitty	0-16 - 1-11	Coolderry	Rath Grounds
	R McRedmond 0-8, J Kinsella 0-2, E McGuinness 0-2, M Robinson 0-1, E Grimes 0-1, P Whelan 0-1, M Corrigan 0-1.		D Murray 0-5, P Teehan 1-0, B Carroll 0-3, S Tooher 0-1, M Corcoran 0-1, D Dooley 0-1.

7 September 2003 Quarter-final	Kilcormac–Killoughey	3-14 - 3-12	Shinrone	St Rynagh's Park
	P Cummins 1-3, D Gleeson 1-1, J Leahy 0-4, C Cassidy 1-0, K Sadler 0-2, M Murray 0-1, B Gorman 0-1, G Healion 0-1, M Leonard 0-1.		P Maloney 2-3, M Cordial 1-1, E Bevans 0-3, T Cleere 0-2, W Comerford 0-1, E Comerford 0-1, D Loughnane 0-1.

=== Semi-finals ===
13 September 2003 Semi-final	Ballyskenagh	4-09 - 1-12	Kinnitty	St Brendan's Park
	B Murphy 2-2, E Franks 1-2, D Carney 1-0, N Murphy 0-2, D Franks 0-2, M O'Hara 0-1.		R McRedmond 1-5, J Kinsella 0-4, E McGuinness 0-1, M Corrigan 0-1.

20 September 2003 Semi-final	Birr	2-18 - 3-13	Kilcormac–Killoughey	St Brendan's Park
	J Pilkington 2-3, R Hanniffy 0-4, S Brown 0-3, G Hanniffy 0-3, Brian Whelehan 0-2, Paul Molloy 0-2, Barry Whelehan 0-1, D Pilkington 0-1.		C Cassidy 1-7, D Gleeson 1-1, T Spain 1-0, P Healion 0-2, M Hand 0-1, J Wynne 0-1, M Murray 0-1.

=== Final ===
5 October 2003 Final	Birr	1-18 - 1-11	Ballyskenagh	St Brendan's Park
	R Hanniffy 0-6, G Hanniffy 0-5, J Pilkington 1-1, Brian Whelehan 0-3, Barry Whelehan 0-1, S Whelehan 0-1, D Hayden 0-1.		E Franks 0-7, B Murphy 1-0, M O'Hara 0-2, A Franks 0-1, J Dooley 0-1.
