= 2005 Offaly Senior Hurling Championship =

Annual hurling competition season

- Sponsor: Aidan Bracken Building Design
- Champions: Birr (19th title); Barry Whelahan (captain); John Goode (manager)
- Runners-up: Coolderry; Barry Teehan (captain); Joe Tynan (manager)

The 2005 Offaly Senior Hurling Championship was the 108th staging of the Offaly Senior Hurling Championship since its establishment by the Offaly County Board in 1896.

Coolderry were the defending champions.

The final was played on 16 October 2005 at St Brendan's Park in Birr, between Birr and Coolderry, in what was their second consecutive meeting in the final. Birr won the match by 0–20 to 0–05 to claim their 19th championship title overall and a first title in two years.

== Results ==
=== Semi-finals ===
2 October 2005 Semi-final	Coolderry	3-10 - 2-11	Kinnitty	St Brendan's Park
	D Murray 2-5, J Brady 1-1, B Carroll 0-4.		J Clendennan 2-1, R McRedmond 0-4, C Coughlan 0-3, M Robinson 0-1, M McRedmond 0-1, R Carroll 0-1.

2 October 2005 Semi-final	Birr	3-24 - 1-12	Shinrone	St Brendan's Park
	S Whelehan 1-6, R Hanniffy 1-4, G Hanniffy 1-4, S Brown 0-3, M Dwane 0-2, D Hayden 0-2, P Molloy 0-1, Barry Whelehan 0-1, D Pilkington 0-1.		M Cordian 0-7, M Keeshan 1-0, E Bevans 0-3, S Ormond 0-1, P Maloney 0-1.

=== Final ===
16 October 2005 Final	Birr	0-20 - 0-05	Coolderry	St Brendan's Park
	S Whelahan and R Hanniffy 0-4 each, S Brown, M Dwane, P Malloy and G Hanniffy 0-2 each. Brian Whelahan, Barry Whelahan, D Hayden and D Pilkington 0-1 each.		D Murray 0-2, J Masterson, D Masterson and D Dooley 0-1 each.	Referee: T Carroll (Kinnitty)
