= 2007–08 All-Ireland Senior Club Hurling Championship =

All-Ireland Senior Club Hurling Championship 2007–08

Championship Details
- Dates: 14 October 2007 – 17 March 2008
- Teams: 20

All Ireland Champions
- Winners: Portumna (2nd win)
- Captain: Ollie Canning
- Manager: Jimmy Heverin

All Ireland Runners-up
- Runners-up: Birr
- Captain: Brian Whelahan
- Manager: Pad Joe Whelahan

Provincial Champions
- Munster: Loughmore-Castleiney
- Leinster: Birr
- Ulster: Dunloy
- Connacht: Portumna

Championship Statistics
- Matches Played: 19
- Top Scorer: Joe Canning (1–24)

The 2007–08 All-Ireland Senior Club Hurling Championship was the 38th staging of the All-Ireland Senior Club Hurling Championship, the Gaelic Athletic Association's premier inter-county club hurling tournament. The competition ran from 14 October 2007 to 17 March 2008.

Ballyhale Shamrocks of Kilkenny were the defending champions, however, they were beaten by Birr in the Leinster semi-final.

The All-Ireland final was played at Croke Park in Dublin on 17 March 2008, between Portumna of Galway and Birr of Offaly, in what was a first championship meeting between the teams. Portumna won the match by 3–19 to 3–09 to claim a second title.

Portumna's Joe Canning was the championship's top scorer with 1–24.

== Participating clubs ==
Team	County	Most recent success		
Team	County	All-Ireland	Provincial	County
Adare	Limerick			2002
Athleague	Roscommon			2006
Ballycran	Down		1993	1995
Ballygunner	Waterford		2001	2005
Ballyhale Shamrocks	Kilkenny	2007	2006	2006
Ballyboden St. Enda's	Dublin			
Bir	Offaly	2003	2002	2006
Camross	Laois		1996	1996
Dunloy	Antrim		2003	2003
Erin's Own	Cork			2006
Kevin Lynch's	Derry			2006
James Stephens	Mayo			
Lixnaw	Kerry			2005
Loughmore-Castleiney	Tipperary			1988
Mount Leinster Rangers	Carlow			2006
Oulart the Ballagh	Wexford			2005
Portumna	Galway	2006	2005	2005
Tulla	Clare			1933

== Connacht Senior Club Hurling Championship ==
=== Connacht quarter-finals ===
20 October 2007 Quarter-final	St. Mary's Kiltoghert	0–06 – 3–10	James Stephens	Páirc Seán Mac Diarmada
	C Cunniffe 0–4, T Cronin 0–1, B Carroll 0–1.		J Duffy 2–0, D Barrett 1–3, P Reape 0–2, K Barrett 0–2, V O'Hora 0–1, B Walsh 0–1, P Walsh 0–1.	Referee: M Carroll (Roscommon)

29 October 2007 Quarter-final	Calry/St. Joseph's	2–04 – 4–14	Athleague

=== Connacht semi-final ===
3 November 2007 Semi-final	Athleague	0–13 – 2–07	James Stephens	James Stephens Park
	K Healy 0–5, J Tighe 0–3, K Barrett 0–1, J Duffy 0–1.	(report)	G Fallon 1–3, A Cunniffe 1–1, I Connaughton 0–1, S McGeeney 0–1, J Glennon 0–1.

10 November 2007 Semi-final replay	Athleague	2–10 – 2–12	James Stephens	Athleague Sportsfield
	G Gallon (1–8), D Flaherty (0–1), S McGeeney (1–1).	(report)	T Duffy (0–1); K Barrett (0–1), V O’Hora (0–1); P Reape (0–1), K Healy (0–3), B Walsh (1–0), D Barrett (0–5), J Duffy (1–0).

=== Connacht final ===
18 November 2007 Final	Portumna	6–23 – 0–07	James Stephens	Athleague Sportsfield
	D Hayes 4–1, N Hayes 1–6, A Smith 0–6 (0–1f), K Hayes 1–2, J Canning 0–5 (0–3f, 0–1'65'), E Lynch, C Ryan, C O'Hehir 0–1 each.	(report)	D Barrett 0–3f, K Barrett 0–1f), V O'Hora (0–1), P Reape, A Stenson (f) 0–1 each.	Referee: J McGrath (Westmeath)

== Leinster Senior Club Hurling Championship ==
=== Leinster quarter-finals ===
4 November 2007 Quarter-final	Ballyhale Shamrocks	1–14 – 0–12	Mount Leinster Rangers	Dr Cullen Park
	M Dermody 0–1, É Fitzpatrick 0–1, T.J. Reid 0–7 5f; E Reid 0–2, P Reid 1–1,	(report)	E Coady 0–1; J Hickey 0–1 line-ball, D Murphy 0–5 4f, 65, W Hickey 0–2, D Byrne 0–1, S.M. Murphy 0–1, C O’Byrne 0–1.	Referee: A. Stapleton (Laois)

11 November 2007 Quarter-final	Ballyboden St. Enda's	1–17 – 0–15	Oulart the Ballagh	Parnell Park
	D Curtin 0–4 (2 65s, 1f), D Sweeney 1–0, C Keaney 0–3, M Griffin, E Kinsella, E Carroll 0–2 each, M Travers, J Doody, S Durkin, S Lambert 0–1 each.	(report)	R Jacob, D Mythen (1f) 0–4 each, N Kirwan 0–2 (2f), D Stamp, P Roche (f), S Doyle, D Nolan, W Whelan 0–1 each.	Referee: J. McGrath (Westmeath)

=== Leinster semi-finals ===
18 November 2007 Semi-final	Ballyboden St. Enda's	2–09 – 1–11	Camross	Parnell Park
	P Ryan 1–3, D Curtin 0–3, D Sweeney 1–0, B Kennedy, E Carroll, C Keaney 0–1 each.	(report)	Z Keenan 0–7, N Holmes 0–4, J Phelan 1–0.	Referee: J. Kelly (Wexford)

18 November 2007 Semi-final	Birr	1–13 – 1–10	Ballyhale Shamrocks	Nowlan Park
	G. Hanniffy 1–2; Brian Whelahan 0–3 frees; K. Nolan 0–2; P. Cleary (free), D. Hayden, S. Whelahan, R. Hanniffy, P. O’Meara and Barry Whelahan 0–1 each.	(report)	B. Costelloe 1–1; T.J. Reid 0–5 (0–1 sideline); M. Fennelly, E. Reid, P. Reid and B. Aylward 0–1 each.	Referee: J. Owens

=== Leinster final ===
2 December 2007 Final	Birr	1–11 – 0–13	Ballyboden St. Enda's	O'Connor Park
	R Hanniffy (0–2), Barry Whelahan (0–1), Brian Whelahan (0–2 (1f, 1’65’), S Whelahan (0–2), P O’Meara (1–4).	(report)	D Curtin (0–6f), S Lambert (0–1), E Carroll (0–2), C. Keaney (0–1), S. Durkin (0–2).	Referee: A Stapleton (Laois)

== Ulster Senior Club Hurling Championship ==
=== Ulster semi-final ===
14 October 2007 Semi-final	Dunloy	2–16 – 3–13	Ballycran	Casement Park
	G O’Kane 0–6, C McGuckian 1–1, A Elliott 0–3, L Richmond 0–3, G McGhee 1–0, P Richmond 0–2, P Shields 0–1.		J Coyle 2–2, B Ennis 1–2, B McGourty 0–3, S Wilson 0–3, C Woods 0–2, C McManus 0–1

21 October 2007 Semi-final replay	Dunloy	1–19 – 1–13	Ballycran	Casement Park
	G O'Kane 0–8 (6f), L Richmond 1–5, C Cunning 0–3, C McGuckian, D Webb, A Elliott 0–1 each.		J Coyle 1–2, C McManus 0–5 (5f), B Ennis 0–2, B McGourty, G Gordon, C Woods (f), C McCarthy 0–1 each.	Referee: G Devlin (Armagh)

=== Ulster final ===
28 October 2007 Semi-final	Dunloy	2–14 – 2–08	Kevin Lynch's	Casement Park
	G O'Kane (0–7, six frees), P Shields (1–2), P Richmond (1–2), C McGuickan (0–1), L Richmond (0–1), D McMullan (0–1).	(report)	G McGonigle (1–3, pen goal, three frees), P McCloskey (1–1), Kevin Hinphey (0–3), P Kelly (0–1).	Referee: D Magee (Down)

== Munster Senior Club Hurling Championship ==
=== Munster quarter-finals ===
4 November 2007 Quarter-final	Tulla	4–16 – 2–06	Lixnaw	Hermitage Park
	A Lynch 1–-8 (3f), K Brennan 2–0, D O'Halloran 1–1, B Lynch 0–2, P Lynch ('65), B Quinn, M Murphy A Leamy, C Dinan 0–1 each.	(report)	J Flaherty 1–4 (4f), E Galvin 1–0, K Dow-ling, S Power 0–1 each.	Referee: J. Sexton (Limerick)

4 November 2007 Quarter-final	Loughmore-Castleiney	2–11 – 0–14	Erin's Own	Semple Stadium
	E Connolly 1–3, N McGrath 0–5 (4f), D McGrath 1–0, E Sweeney, M Webster and R Stapleton 0–1 each.	(report)	E Murphy 0–4 (3f), M O'Connor, M Murphy 0–2 each, P Kelly, S Kelly, C Coakley, R Carroll, A Bowen, F Murphy 0–1 each.	Referee: S. McMahon (Clare)

=== Munster semi-finals ===
18 November 2007 Semi-final	Loughmore-Castleiney	1–15 – 1–10	Adare	Gaelic Grounds
	E. Sweeney 0–7 (0–4 frees); N. McGrath 0–5 (0–3 frees); M. Webster 1–1; D. McGrath, T. King, 0–1 each.	(report)	D. Sheehan 0–5 (0–2 frees); D. Sexton 0–3; L. Costello 1–0; M. Noonan 0–2.	Referee: A. Heagney (Clare)

18 November 2007 Semi-final	Tulla	2–13 – 0–14	Ballyduff Upper	Cusack Park
	B. Quinn 1–2; D. O’Halloran 0–4; P. Molumphy 1–0 (og); M. Murphy 0–3; A. Lynch, B. Lynch 0–2 each.	(report)	B. Hannon 0–10 (0–5 frees, 0–1 65); B. Kearney 0–2; S. Kearney, J. Twomey 0–1 each.	Referee: C. McAlister (Cork)

=== Munster final ===
2 December 2007 Final	Loughmore-Castleiney	1–06 – 0–07	Tulla	Gaelic Grounds
	E. Sweeney 1–2 (0–1 free); R. Stapleton, E. Connolly, T. King, N. McGrath (free), 0–1 each.	(report)	A. Lynch 0–4 (0–4 frees); C. O’Halloran 0–2, E. Torpey 0–1.	Referee: C. McAllister (Cork)

== All-Ireland Senior Club Hurling Championship ==
=== All-Ireland semi-finals ===
24 February 2008 Semi-final	Portumna	2–13 – 2–08	Loughmore-Castleiney	Gaelic Grounds
	J. Canning 1–9 (0–6 frees); N. Hayes 1–0; K. Hayes 0–2; D. Hayes 0–1; D. Canning 0–1.	(report)	N. McGrath 1–4 (0–2 frees, 0–1 65); M. Webster 1–0; E. Sweeney 0–3 (0–1 free, 0–1 65); E. Connolly 0–1.	Referee: A. Stapleton (Laois)

24 February 2008 Semi-final	Birr	0–17 – 0–09	Dunloy	St Tiernach's Park
	S Whelahan (0–5, 0–4 frees), R Hanniffy (0–4), S Ryan (0–2), Brian Whelahan (0–2, 0–1 free), M Dwane (0–1), G Hanniffy (0–1), Barry Whelahan (0–1), P Cleary (0–1 '65).	(report)	G O'Kane (0–5, 0–4 frees), P Richmond (0–1), P Shiels (0–1), D McMullan (0–1), P Doherty (0–1).	Referee: M. Haverty (Galway)

=== All-Ireland final ===
17 March 2008 Final	Portumna	3–19 – 3–09	Birr	Croke Park
	J. Canning 0–10 (0–6 frees, 0–1 65, 0–1 sideline); A. Smith 2–2; D. Hayes 1–3; K. Hayes 0–3; L. Smith 0–1.	(report)	S. Whelahan 1–7 (1–6 frees); P. O’Meara 1–0; S. Browne 1–0; R. Hanniffy, Brian Whelahan 0–1 each.	Referee: J. Sexton (Cork)

== Championship statistics ==
=== Scoring ===
- Widest winning margin: 34 points
  - Portumna 6–23 : 0–7 James Stephens (Connacht final)
- Most goals in a match: 6
  - Portumna 6–23 : 0–7 James Stephens (Connacht final)
  - Tulla 4–16 : 2–6 Lixnaw (Munster quarter-final)
  - Portumna 3–19 : 3–9 Birr (Connacht final)
- Most points in a match: 40
  - De La Salle 1–21 : 1–19 Ruairí Óg, Cushendall (All-Ireland semi-final)
- Most points in a match: 32
  - Ballyboden St. Enda's 1–17 : 0–15 Oulart the Ballagh (Leinster quarter-final)
- Most goals by one team in a match: 6
  - Portumna 6–23 : 0–7 James Stephens (Connacht final)
- Most points by one team in a match: 23
  - Portumna 6–23 : 0–7 James Stephens (Connacht final)

=== Top scorers ===
Rank	Player	Club	Tally	Total	Matches	Average
1	Joe Canning	Portumna	1–24	27	3	9.0
2	Gregory O'Kane	Dunloy	0–26	26	4	6.50
3	Damien Hayes	Portumna	5–05	20	3	6.67
4	Noel McGrath	Loughmore-Castleiney	1–15	18	4	4.50
4	Simon Whelahan	Birr	1–15	18	4	4.50
6	Aidan Lynch	Tulla	1–14	17	3	5.67
7	Evan Sweeney	Loughmore-Castleiney	1–13	16	4	4.00
8	Andrew Smith	Portumna	2–08	14	3	3.66
9	James Coyle	Dunloy	3–04	13	2	6.50
9	David Curtin	Ballyboden St. Enda's	0–13	13	3	4.33
