= 1968 Offaly Senior Hurling Championship =

Annual hurling competition season

- Champions: St Rynagh's (3rd title); Gerry Burke (captain)
- Runners-up: Coolderry

The 1968 Offaly Senior Hurling Championship was the 71st staging of the Offaly Senior Hurling Championship since its establishment by the Offaly County Board in 1896.

Drumcullen entered the championship as the defending champions.

The final was played on 10 November 1968 at St Brendan's Park in Birr, between St Rynagh's and Coolderry, in what was their second meeting in the final overall and a first final meeting in three years. St Rynagh's won the match by 1–12 to 3–04 to claim their third championship title overall and a first championship title in two years.

== Results ==
=== Final ===
10 November 1968 Final	St Rynagh's	1-12 - 3-04	Coolderry	St Brendan's Park
