= 2007 Offaly Senior Hurling Championship =

Annual hurling competition season

- Sponsor: Aidan Bracken Building Design
- Champions: Birr (21st title); Brian Whelehan (captain); Pad Joe Whelehan (manager)
- Runners-up: Kilcormac–Killoughey; Martin Murray (captain); John Leahy (manager)

The 2007 Offaly Senior Hurling Championship was the 110th staging of the Offaly Senior Hurling Championship since its establishment by the Offaly County Board in 1896.

Birr entered the championship as the defending champions.

The final was played on 21 October 2007 at O'Connor Park in Tullamore, between Birr and Kilcormac–Killoughey, in what was their second meeting in the final overall and a first meeting in the final in five years. Birr won the match by 0–15 to 0–10 to claim their 21st championship title overall and a third title in succession.

== Results ==
=== Semi-finals ===
| 29 September 2007 Semi-final | Birr | 2-09 - 0-12 | Cooldery | O'Connor Park |
| | M Dwane 1-1, S Brown 1-1, Brian Whelehan 0-2, S Whelehan 0-2, P Cleary 0-1, G Hanniffy 0-1, R Hanniffy 0-1. | | D Murray 0-4, C Parlon 0-3, B Carroll 0-3, B Teehan 0-1, J Masterson 0-1. |

| 30 September 2007 Semi-final | Kilcormac–Killoughey | 1-15 - 2-12 | Kinnitty | O'Connor Park |
| | Ciaran Slevin 1-6, M Leonard 0-3, C Cassidy 0-1, C Mahon 0-1, J Gorman 0-1, P Healion 0-1, D Currams 0-1, D Gleeson 0-1. | | O Kealey 1-2, C Coughlan 0-4, J Clendennan 1-0, S Moloy 0-3, M McRedmond 0-2, A McRedmond 0-1. |

| 6 October 2007 Semi-final replay | Kilcormac–Killoughey | 2-23 - 1-11 | Kinnitty | O'Connor Park |
| | Ciaran Slevin 0-9, J Gorman 0-4, D Currams 1-1, M Leonard 1-1, C Mahon 0-3, C Cassidy 0-3, E Lee 0-1, P Healion 0-1. | | S Molloy 0-5, M Robinson 1-1, C Coughaln 0-2, J Kinsella 0-1, M McRedmond 0-1, L Brewer 0-1. |

=== Final ===
| 21 October 2007 Final | Birr | 0-15 - 0-10 | Kilcormac–Killoughey | O'Connor Park |
| | Brian Whelahan 0-10 (7f), G Hanniffy 0-2, S Brown, P O'Meara and K Hehir 0-1 each. Kilcormac/Killoughey: | | C Slevin 0-3 (2f), D Gleeson and C Cassidy (2f) 0-2 each, K Rigney, E Lee and J Gorman 0-1 each. |
