= Basil Johnson =

Irish hurler

Personal information
- Native name: Breasal Mac Seáin (Irish)
- Born: Banagher, County Offaly, Ireland

Sport
- Sport: Hurling
- Position: Midfielder
Club
- Years: Club
- St Rynagh's
Club titles
- Leinster titles: 2
Inter-county*
Years	County	Apps (scores)
1966-1973	Offaly	3 (1-1)
Inter-county titles
- Leinster titles: 0
- All-Irelands: 0
- NHL: 0
- All Stars: 0
- *Inter County team apps and scores correct as of 19:16, 30 June 2014.

Basil Johnson is an Irish former hurler who played as a midfielder for the Offaly senior team.

Born in Banagher, County Offaly, Johnson first played competitive hurling in his youth. He made his senior debut with Offaly during the 1965-66 National League and immediately became a regular member of the team. During his brief career he experienced little success.

At club level Johnson is a two-time Leinster medallist with St Rynagh's. He also won numerous championship medals with the club.

His retirement came following the conclusion of the 1973 championship.

== Honours ==
St Rynagh's

- Leinster Senior Club Hurling Championship (2): 1970, 1972
