= 1973 All-Ireland Senior Club Hurling Championship final =

1973 All-Ireland Senior Club Hurling Final
- Event: 1972–73 All-Ireland Senior Club Hurling Championship
Glen Rovers	St. Rynagh's
2–18	2–8
- Date: 9 December 1973
- Venue: Croke Park, Dublin
- Referee: Seán O'Grady (Limerick)
- Attendance: 500

The 1973 All-Ireland Senior Club Hurling Championship final was a hurling match played at Croke Park on 9 December 1973 to determine the winners of the 1972–73 All-Ireland Senior Club Hurling Championship, the third season of the All-Ireland Senior Club Hurling Championship, a tournament organised by the Gaelic Athletic Association for the champion clubs of the four provinces of Ireland. The final was contested by Glen Rovers of Cork and St. Rynagh's of Offaly, with Glen Rovers winning by 2-18 to 2-8.

The All-Ireland final between Glen Rovers and St. Rynagh's was a unique occasion as it was the first ever championship meeting between the two teams. It remains their only championship meeting. Both sides were hoping to win the title for the first time.

The game was a disappointing end to a controversial championship. Glen Rovers had earlier been awarded the All-Ireland title by a committee, however, the club preferred to contest the game and win it on the field of play. Only a few hundred spectators turned out at GAA headquarters to witness a game that lacked any entertainment value. St. Rynagh's were described as being inferior to Glen Rovers. The Offaly men repeatedly missed chances in the opening thirty minutes as the Glen played into a blinding sun towards the canal end. Goalkeeper Finbarr O'Neill saved Glen Rovers on a number of occasions and the Cork team had a 1–10 to 1–3 lead at the interval. St. Rynaghs' six first-half wides did not help the situation. Glen Rovers stretched their lead to eleven points just after the restart. Basil Johnson got a goal for St. Rynagh's, however, it was too little too late as Glen Rovers won by 2–18 to 2–8.

St. Rynaghs' All-Ireland defeat was the second of two All-Ireland defeats in three years. They remain a team who has contested All-Ireland deciders but has never claimed the ultimate prize.

== Match ==
=== Details ===
9 December 1973

Glen Rovers	2–18 – 2–8	St. Rynagh's
T Buckley (1–9), P Harte (1–0), M Ryan (0–3), R Crowley (0–4), J Young (0–1), JJ O'Neill (0–1).		B Moylan (0–6), B Johnston (1–1), P Mulhaire (1–0), P Horan (0–2).

Croke Park, Dublin
Referee: S O’Grady (Limerick)

Glen Rovers	St. Rynagh's
