= Diarmuid Horan =

Irish hurler

Personal information
- Native name: Diarmuid Ó hÓráin (Irish)
- Born: 1988 (age 37–38) Banagher, County Offaly, Ireland
- Occupations: Athletic and rehabilitation therapist

Sport
- Sport: Hurling
- Position: Left wing-back
Club
- Years: Club
- St Rynagh's
Club titles
- Offaly titles: 0
Inter-county*
Years	County	Apps (scores)
2008-present	Offaly	7 (0-2)
Inter-county titles
- Leinster titles: 0
- All-Irelands: 0
- NHL: 0
- All Stars: 0
- *Inter County team apps and scores correct as of 18:43, 9 December 2012.

Diarmuid Horan (born 1988) is an Irish hurler who played as a left wing-back for the Offaly senior hurling team.

Horan made his first appearance for the team during the 200 National League and was a regular member of the starting fifteen until he left the panel prior to the 2009 championship. During that time he experienced little success. Horan returned to inter-county hurling with Offaly in 2012.

At club level Horan plays with the St Rynagh's club.

Horan's father, Pádraig, and his brother Cathal, also played hurling with Offaly.
