= 1981 Offaly Senior Hurling Championship =

Annual hurling competition season

- Champions: St Rynagh's (11th title); Pádraig Horan (captain)
- Runners-up: Kinnitty; Seán Clarke (captain)

The 1981 Offaly Senior Hurling Championship was the 84th staging of the Offaly Senior Hurling Championship since its establishment by the Offaly County Board in 1896.

Coolderry entered the championship as the defending champions.

The final was played on 15 November 1981 at St Brendan's Park in Birr, between St Rynagh's and Kinnitty, in what was their sixth meeting in the final overall. St Rynagh's won the match by 1–10 to 1–07 to claim their 11th championship title overall and a first championship title in five years.

== Results ==
=== Final ===
15 November 1981 Final	St Rynagh's	1-10 - 1-07	Kinnitty	St Brendan's Park
