= 1982 Offaly Senior Hurling Championship =

Annual hurling competition season

- Champions: St Rynagh's (12th title); Seán White (captain)
- Runners-up: Lusmagh

The 1982 Offaly Senior Hurling Championship was the 85th staging of the Offaly Senior Hurling Championship since its establishment by the Offaly County Board in 1896.

St Rynagh's entered the championship as the defending champions.

The final was played on 19 October 1982 at St Brendan's Park in Birr, between St Rynagh's and Lusmagh, in what was their first ever meeting in the final. St Rynagh's won the match by 2–09 to 0–11 to claim their 12th championship title overall and a second championship title in succession.

== Results ==
=== Final ===
| 10 October 1982 Final | St Rynagh's | 2-09 - 0-11 | Lusmagh | St Brendan's Park |
