= 1967 Offaly Senior Hurling Championship =

Annual hurling competition season

- Dates: 16 April - 29 October 1967
- Teams: 12
- Champions: Kinnitty (4th title); Pat Spain (captain)
- Runners-up: Coolderry

The 1967 Offaly Senior Hurling Championship was the 70th staging of the Offaly Senior Hurling Championship since its establishment by the Offaly County Board in 1896. The draw for the opening round fixtures took place on 29 January 1967. The championship ran from 16 April to 29 October 1967.

St Rynagh's entered the championship as the defending champions, however, they were beaten by Kinnitty in the semi-finals. Clara withdrew from the championship before it started.

The final was played on 29 October 1967 at St Brendan's Park in Birr, between Kinnitty and Coolderry, in what was their third meeting in the final overall and a first meeting in 37 years. Kinnitty won the match by 4–08 to 3–04 to claim their fourth championship title overall and a first title in 37 years.

== Results ==
=== Semi-finals ===
17 September 1967 Semi-final	Coolderry	2-09 - 0-07	Tullamore	St Brendan's Park

15 October 1967 Semi-final	Kinnitty	3-11 - 2-07	St Rynagh's	St Brendan's Park

=== Final ===
29 October 1967 Final	Kinnitty	4-08 - 3-04	Coolderry	St Brendan's Park
	J Flaherty 1-8, E Moyles 1-0, P Dooley 1-0, P Moyles 1-0.		T Dooley 1-1, T Erritty 1-1, S Kennedy 1-0, O Kennedy 0-1, T Loughnane 0-1.	Referee: S O'Brien (Rahan)
