= Pat Moylan =

Pat or Patrick Moylan may refer to:

- Pat Moylan (politician) (born 1946), Irish Fianna Fáil politician
- Pat Moylan (Cork hurler) (born 1949), Irish hurler for the Cork senior team
- Pat Moylan (Offaly hurler), Irish hurler for the Offaly senior team
