= 2008 Offaly Senior Hurling Championship =

Annual hurling competition season

- Champions: Birr (22nd title); Rory Hanniffy (captain); Pad Joe Whelehan (manager)
- Runners-up: Kinnitty; Liam Bergin (captain); Mick Molloy (manager)

The 2008 Offaly Senior Hurling Championship was the 111th staging of the Offaly Senior Hurling Championship since its establishment by the Offaly County Board in 1896.

Birr entered the championship as the defending champions.

The final was played on 12 October 2008 at O'Connor Park in Tullamore, between Birr and Kinnitty, in what was their first ever meeting in the final. Birr won the match by 1–15 to 0–15 to claim their 22nd championship title overall and a fourth title in succession.

== Results ==
=== Semi-finals ===
20 September 2008 Semi-final	Kinnitty	1-12 - 2-07	Coolderry	O'Connor Park
	C Coughlan 0-6, S Molloy 0-3, J Clendennen 1-0, O Kealey 0-2, M McRedmond 0-1.		D Murray 1-2, B Carroll 0-3, P Teehan 1-0, J Brady 0-1, D Masterson 0-1.

27 September 2008 Semi-final	Birr	0-17 - 0-13	Kilcormac–Killoughey	O'Connor Park
	S Whelehan 0-8, D Hayden 0-3, S Brown 0-3, R Hanniffy 0-2, S Ryan 0-1.		Ciaran Slevin 0-5, B Leonard 0-4, C Mahon 0-1, E Lee 0-1, P Healion 0-1, D Currams 0-1.

=== Final ===
12 October 2008 Final	Birr	1-15 - 0-15	Kinnitty	O'Connor Park
	S Whelahan 0-5 (0-3f); B Lonergan 1-1; D Hayden 0-4; G Hanniffy 0-3; R Hanniffy and P O'Meara 0-1 each.		C Coughlan 0-11 (0-7fs, 0-2 '65s); M McRedmond 0-2; F Kealey and R McRedmond 0-1 each.
