= 1964 Offaly Senior Hurling Championship =

Annual hurling competition season

- Champions: Tullamore (9th title); Andy Gallagher (captain)
- Runners-up: St Rynagh's

The 1964 Offaly Senior Hurling Championship was the 67th staging of the Offaly Senior Hurling Championship since its establishment by the Offaly County Board in 1896.

Coolderry entered the championship as the defending champions.

The final was played on 22 November 1964 at St Brendan's Park in Birr, between Tullamore and St Rynagh's, in what was their first ever meeting in the final. Tullamore won the match by 1–11 to 3–01 to claim their ninth championship title overall and a first title in five years.

== Results ==
=== Final ===
22 November 1964 Final	Tullamore	1-11 - 3-01	St Rynagh's	St Brendan's Park
