= 1984 Offaly Senior Hurling Championship =

Annual hurling competition season

- Champions: Kinnitty (8th title); Ger Coughlan (captain)
- Runners-up: St Rynagh's; Billy Keane (captain)

The 1984 Offaly Senior Hurling Championship was the 87th staging of the Offaly Senior Hurling Championship since its establishment by the Offaly County Board in 1896.

Kinnitty entered the championship as the defending champions.

The final was played on 14 October 1984 at St Brendan's Park in Birr, between Kinnitty and St Rynagh's, in what was their eighth meeting in the final overall and a second successive meeting. Kinnitty won the match by 1–12 to 1–06 to claim their eighth championship title overall and a second successive title.

== Results ==
=== Final ===
14 October 1984 Final	Kinnitty	1-12 - 1-06	St Rynagh's	St Brendan's Park
	P Corrigan 0-6, J Flaherty 1-2, M Corrigan 0-2, G Coughlan 0-1, C Spain 0-1.		P Horan 0-4, T Conneely 1-0, S White 0-1, D Fogarty 0-1.
