= Gary Hanniffy =

Irish hurler (born 1977)

Personal information
- Native name: Gearóid Ó hAinfidh (Irish)
- Born: 4 April 1977 (age 49) Athlone, County Westmeath, Ireland
- Occupation: Business Development Director
- Height: 6 ft 4 in (193 cm)

Sport
- Sport: Hurling
- Position: Centre-forward
Club
- Years: Club
- Birr
Club titles
- Offaly titles: 11
- Leinster titles: 6
- All-Ireland Titles: 4
Inter-county
Years	County	Apps (scores)
1997–2008	Offaly	43 (3–40)
Inter-county titles
- Leinster titles: 0
- All-Irelands: 1
- NHL: 0
- All Stars: 0

Gary Hanniffy (born 4 April 1977) is an Irish hurler who played as a centre-forward for the Offaly senior hurling team.

Hanniffy made his first appearance for the team during the 1997 National League and subsequently became a regular member of the starting fifteen until his retirement prior to the 2008 championship. During that time he won one All-Ireland medal and one National Hurling League (Division 2) medal. Hanniffy was an All-Ireland runner-up on one occasion.

At club level Hanniffy is a four-time All-Ireland medalist with Birr. In addition to this he has also won six Leinster medals and eleven county club championship medals.

Hanniffy's father, Declan and his brothers, Darren and Rory, also played hurling with Offaly.

== Playing career ==
=== Club ===
Hanniffy plays his club hurling with Birr and has enjoyed much success during a lengthy career.

He was still a minor when he joined the club's senior team in 1994. That year he was a non-playing substitute when Birr made a clean-sweep of county, Leinster and All-Ireland titles.

By 1997 Hanniffy was a regular member of the starting fifteen. That year he won his first county championship medal following a 0–14 to 2–4 defeat of Seir Kieran. He later added a Leinster medal to his collection following an 0–11 to 0–5 defeat of Castletown. The subsequent All-Ireland final saw Birr take on Sarsfield's of Galway. Darren Hanniffy scored the only goal of the game after just five minutes and gave Birr a lead that they would never surrender. A 1–13 to 0–9 victory gave Hanniffy his first All-Ireland medal.

After surrendering their titles the following year, Birr bounced back in 1999. A 3–15 to 1–11 defeat of St. Rynagh's gave Hanniffy a second championship medal. A subsequent 1–16 to 0–11 defeat of Castletown gave Hanniffy a second Leinster medal.

Hanniffy won further championship medals in 2000 and 2001 as Birr retained their status as the kingpins of Offaly hurling. Once again Birr defeated Castletown in the provincial decider to give Hanniffy his third Leinster medal. Once again Birr qualified for the All-Ireland final with Clarinbridge providing the opposition. A Declan Pilkington goal inside sixty seconds was the perfect start, although the Westerners did recover to lead by 1–4 to 1 -2 at the break. With wind advantage, Birr took control and secured a 2–10 to 1–5 victory. It was Hanniffy's second All-Ireland medal.

Birr continued their dominance in 2002 with Hanniffy winning a fifth championship medal following a 3–12 to 2–7 defeat of Kilcormac-Killoughey. He later added a fourth Leinster medal to his collection following a 2–5 to 1–2 defeat of Young Irelands in deplorable conditions. Birr later faced Dunloy in the All-Ireland decider. At the third time of asking Birr finally retained the title with a 1–19 to 0–11 victory. It was Hanniffy's third All-Ireland medal.

In 2003 Birr defeated Ballyskenach by 1–18 to 1–11 to secure their fifth successive county championship. It was Hanniffy's sixth championship medal.

A record six-in-a-row proved beyond Birr, however, Hanniffy won his seventh championship medal in 2005 as his side beat Coolderry by 0–20 to 0–5.

It was the start of another great run of success for Birr as the club retained their titles in 2006 and 2007. Later that year Hanniffy won his fifth and final Leinster medal as Birr narrowly defeated Ballyboden St. Enda's by 1–11 to 0–13. Birr later had the chance to make history by becoming the first club side to win five All-Ireland titles, however, Portumna easily defeated Hanniffy's side by 3–19 to 3–9 in the decider.

In 2008 Hanniffy won a remarkable tenth championship medal as Birr defeated Kinnitty by 1–15 to 0–15. It was a fourth successive county title for Birr.

=== Inter-county ===
Hanniffy made his senior debut for Offaly in a National Hurling League game against Tipperary in 1997. Later that year he came on as a substitute against Laois to make his championship debut.

By 1998 Hanniffy was a regular impact sub for Offaly's championship campaign. He lined out in his first provincial decider that year, however, Kilkenny defeated Offaly by 3–10 to 1–11. This defeat prompted the Offaly manager, Babs Keating, to describe the team as "sheep in a heap", and he promptly resigned. It looked as if Offaly's championship hopes were in disarray, however, they overcame Antrim in the All-Ireland quarter-final and qualified to meet Clare in the semi-final. The first game ended in a draw and had to be replayed, however, the replay was ended early because of a time-keeping error by the referee Jimmy Cooney. Following a protest on the pitch of Croke Park by the Offaly supporters it was decided that Clare and Offaly would meet for a third time. Hanniffy's side won the third game and qualified to play Kilkenny in the final. On that day Brian Whelahan delivered one of his greatest-ever Offaly performances, scoring 1–6. Offaly reversed the Leinster final defeat by winning the All-Ireland final by 2–16 to 1–13. It was Hanniffy's first All-Ireland medal.

Offaly surrendered their All-Ireland crown the following year but returned to the All-Ireland decider again in 2000 in a repeat of the Leinster final. Kilkenny's D.J. Carey capitalised on an Offaly mistake after just six minutes to start a goal-fest for "the Cats". Carey scored 2–4 in all, sharing his second goal with Henry Shefflin who also scored a goal in the second-half. At the full-time whistle Kilkenny were the champions by 5–15 to 1–14.

The following few seasons proved difficult as Kilkenny went on to dominated the provincial championship.

In 2005 Hanniffy won a Division 2 medal in the National League following a 6–21 to 4–7 trouncing of Carlow.

Following Offaly's relegation from Division 1 of the National League in 2008, Hanniffy decided to call time on his inter-county career.

== Honours ==
=== As a player ===
Birr

- All-Ireland Senior Club Hurling Championship (4): 1995, 1998, 2002, 2003
- Leinster Senior Club Hurling Championship (6): 1994, 1997, 1999, 2001, 2002, 2007
- Offaly Senior Club Hurling Championship (11): 1994, 1997, 1999, 2000, 2001, 2002, 2003, 2005, 2006, 2007, 2008

Offaly

- All-Ireland Senior Hurling Championship (1): 1998
- National Hurling League (Division 2) (1): 2002

Leinster

- Railway Cup (2): 2003, 2006
- Offaly player of the year 2007

Achievements
Preceded by Simon Whelahan (Birr)	All-Ireland Club Hurling Final winning captain 2003	Succeeded by John McCarthy (Newtownshandrum)
Sporting positions
Preceded by	Offaly Senior Hurling Captain; 2003–2004	Succeeded by Barry Teehan
