= 1976 Offaly Senior Hurling Championship =

Annual hurling competition season

- Champions: St Rynagh's (10th title); Pat Moylan (captain)
- Runners-up: Kinnitty

The 1976 Offaly Senior Hurling Championship was the 79th staging of the Offaly Senior Hurling Championship since its establishment by the Offaly County Board in 1896.

St Rynagh's entered the championship as the defending champions.

The final was played on 19 September 1976 at St Brendan's Park in Birr, between St Rynagh's and Kinnitty, in what was their fourth meeting in the final overall. St Rynagh's won the match by 3–11 to 0–05 to claim their 10th championship title overall and a record fifth championship title in succession.

== Results ==
=== Final ===
19 September 1976 Final	St Rynagh's	3-11 - 0-05	Kinnitty	St Brendan's Park
