= Charlie McGuckin =

Irish hurler

Personal information
- Native name: Cathal Mag Eochaín (Irish)
- Born: 1999 (age 26–27) Gorey, County Wexford, Ireland
- Occupation: Student

Sport
- Sport: Hurling
- Position: Left wing-forward
Club
- Years: Club
- Naomh Éanna
Club titles
- Wexford titles: 1
College
- Years: College
- Institute of Technology, Carlow
College titles
- Fitzgibbon titles: 0
Inter-county*
Years	County	Apps (scores)
2022-	Wexford	0 (0-00)
Inter-county titles
- Leinster titles: 0
- All-Irelands: 0
- NHL: 0
- All Stars: 0
- *Inter County team apps and scores correct as of 22:11, 13 February 2022.

Charlie McGuckin (born 1999) is an Irish hurler who plays for club side Naomh Éanna and at inter-county level with the Wexford senior hurling team. He usually lines out as a forward.

== Career ==
Son of Offaly All-Ireland-winner Shane, McGuckin first played at juvenile and underage levels with the Naomh Éanna club before progressing onto the senior team. He won a Wexford SHC title in 2018 after beating St. Martin's in the final. McGuckin first appeared on the inter-county scene as a member of the Wexford minor hurling team in 2017 before later captaining the under-20 team. He was drafted onto the Wexford senior hurling team for the 2022 season.

== Career statistics ==
As of match played 13 February 2022.

Team	Year	National League			Leinster		All-Ireland		Total	
Team	Year	Division	Apps	Score	Apps	Score	Apps	Score	Apps	Score
Wexford	2022	Division 1B	2	0-00	0	0-00	0	0-00	2	0-00
Career total			2	0-00	0	0-00	0	0-00	2	0-00

== Honours ==
Naomh Éanna

- Wexford Senior Hurling Championship: 2018

Sporting positions
Preceded by Conor Firman as U-21 captain	Wexford under-20 hurling team captain 2019	Succeeded by Cian Molloy
