= 2006 Offaly Senior Hurling Championship =

Annual hurling competition season

- Champions: Birr (20th title); John Paul O'Meara (captain); John Goode (manager)
- Runners-up: Coolderry; Brendan O'Meara (captain); Joe Tynan (manager)

The 2006 Offaly Senior Hurling Championship was the 109th staging of the Offaly Senior Hurling Championship since its establishment by the Offaly County Board in 1896.

Birr entered the championship as the defending champions.

The final, a replay, was played on 8 October 2006 at St Brendan's Park in Birr, between Birr and Coolderry, in what was their fifth meeting in the final overall and a third consecutive meeting in the final. Birr won the match by 2–09 to 1–11 to claim their 20th championship title overall and a second title in succession.

== Results ==
=== Semi-finals ===
16 September 2006 Semi-final	Birr	0-18 - 1-10	Kilcormac–Killoughey	Rath Grounds
	S Whelehan 0-5, G Hanniffy 0-2, M Dwane 0-2, S Ryan 0-2, B Whelehan 0-2, S Brown 0-2, R Hanniffy 0-1, P Cleary 0-1, K Hehir 0-1.		C Cassidy 1-5, M Murray 0-2, Ciaran Slevin 0-2, P Healion 0-1.

17 September 2006 Semi-final	Coolderry	1-13 - 0-12	St Rynagh's	St Brendan's Park
	F Parlon 1-2, B Carroll 0-4, P Ryan 0-3, D Murray 0-1, K Brady 0-1, M Corcoran 0-1, J Brady 0-1.		D Horan 0-8, H Whelehan 0-2, C Flannery 0-1, K Kelly 0-1.

=== Final ===
1 October 2006 Final	Birr	0-11 - 1-08	Coolderry	St Brendan's Park
	S Whelahan 0-3 (3f), S Ryan, S Brown 0-2 each, Brian Whelahan (f), P Molloy, G Hanniffy, M Dwane 0-1.	Report	D Murray 0-5 (2f, 1 '65'), J Brady 1-0, J Masterson 0-2, P Teehan 0-1.

=== Final replay ===
8 October 2006 Final replay	Birr	2-09 - 1-11	Coolderry	St Brendan's Park
	Brian Whelahan 0-3 (2f), G Hanniffy, S Ryan 1-0, S Brown, D Hayden 0-2, P O'Meara, M Dwane (f) 0-1.	Report	B Carroll 0-5, B Larkin 1-0, D Murray 0-2 (2f), J McLoughney, B Teehan, M Corcoran, P Ryqan 0-1.
