= 2002 Offaly Senior Hurling Championship =

Annual hurling competition season

- Champions: Birr (17th title); Gary Hanniffy (captain); Pad Joe Whelehan (manager)
- Runners-up: Kilcormac–Killoughey; Henry Kilmartin (captain); Séamus Gleeson (manager)

The 2002 Offaly Senior Hurling Championship was the 105th staging of the Offaly Senior Hurling Championship since its establishment by the Offaly County Board in 1896.

Birr were the defending champions.

The final was played on 29 September 2002 at St Brendan's Park in Birr, between Birr and Kilcormac–Killoughey, in what was their first ever meeting in the final. Birr won the match by 3–11 to 2–07 to claim their 17th championship title overall and a fourth title in succession.

== Results ==
=== Semi-finals ===
| 7 September 2002 Semi-final | Kilcormac–Killoughey | 0-11 - 1-05 | Coolderry | St Brendan's Park |
| | J Leahy 0-4, M Hand 0-3, K Rigney 0-1, P Cummins 0-1, T Spain 0-1, C Cassidy 0-1. | | D Murray 1-1, D Dooley 0-2, B Carroll 0-2. |

| 7 September 2002 Semi-final | Birr | 0-09 - 1-06 | St Rynagh's | St Brendan's Park |
| | S Whelehan 0-4, D Pilkington 0-1, Brian Whelehan 0-1, Barry Whelehan 0-1, P Molloy 0-1, R Hanniffy 0-1. | | E Martin 0-5, M Duignan 1-0, G O'Connor 0-1. |

| 14 September 2002 Semi-final replay | Birr | 0-16 - 1-05 | St Rynagh's | St Brendan's Park |
| | S Whelehan 0-8, Brian Whelehan 0-3, R Hanniffy 0-2, G Hanniffy 0-2, D Hayden 0-1. | | N Hogan 1-0, E Martin 0-2, F Dolan 0-2, D Kelly 0-1. |

=== Final ===
| 29 September 2002 Final | Birr | 3-11 - 2-07 | Kilcormac–Killoughey | St Brendan's Park |
| | S Whelahan 1-5 (0-4 frees); R Hanniffy and L Power 1-0 each; G Hanniffy 0-2; M Dwane, D Hayden, J Pilkington, P Molly and Brian Whelahan (free), 0-1 each. | | J Leahy 0-4 frees; M Hand 1-0 free; D Gleeson 1-0; C Cassidy 0-3 (0-2 frees). |
