= 1974 Offaly Senior Hurling Championship =

Annual hurling competition season

- Champions: St Rynagh's (8th title); Pádraig Horan (captain)
- Runners-up: Birr; Gerry O'Meara (captain)

The 1974 Offaly Senior Hurling Championship was the 77th staging of the Offaly Senior Hurling Championship since its establishment by the Offaly County Board in 1896.

St Rynagh's entered the championship as the defending champions.

The final was played on 25 August 1974 at St Brendan's Park in Birr, between St Rynagh's and Birr, in what was their second meeting in the final in overall. St Rynagh's won the match by 1–11 to 2–03 to claim their eighth championship title overall and a third championship title in succession.

== Results ==
=== Semi-finals ===
| 28 July 1974 Semi-final | Birr | 1-10 - 0-08 | St Carthage's | O'Connor Park |

| 4 August 1974 Semi-final | St Rynagh's | 3-13 - 2-08 | Drumcullen | St Brendan's Park |

=== Final ===
| 25 August 1974 Final | St Rynagh's | 1-11 - 2-03 | Birr | St Brendan's Park |
