= Brendan Murphy (hurler) =

Irish hurler

Personal information
- Native name: Breandán Ó Murchú (Irish)
- Born: 1980 (age 45–46) Ballyskenagh, County Offaly
- Occupation: Doctor

Sport
- Sport: Hurling
- Position: Midfield
Club
- Years: Club
- Ballyskenagh
Club titles
- Offaly titles: 3 Dublin Championship & 1 Fitzgibbon Cup
Inter-county*
Years	County	Apps (scores)
2000-2012	Offaly	45 (10-58)
Inter-county titles
- Leinster titles: 0
- All-Irelands: 0
- NHL: 2
- All Stars: 0 (1 nomination)
- *Inter County team apps and scores correct as of 16:20, 16 January 2015.

Brendan Murphy (born 1980) is an Irish sportsperson. He plays hurling with his local club Ballyskenagh and has been a member of the Offaly senior inter-county team since 2000. He won 2 Division 2 Hurling Leagues, 1 Leinster u 21 title, 2 Railway Cup Medals, 3 Dublin Championships and 1 Fitzgibbon Cup. He was nominated for Young Hurler of the Year in 2000 and an Allstar in 2003. He captained Offaly in 2006. On 2 November 2012, Murphy retired from inter-county GAA.

Sporting positions
Preceded by Barry Teehan	Offaly Senior Hurling Captain; 2006	Succeeded by Rory Hanniffy
