= 1975 Offaly Senior Hurling Championship =

Annual hurling competition season

- Champions: St Rynagh's (9th title); Pad Joe Whelehan (captain)
- Runners-up: Birr

The 1975 Offaly Senior Hurling Championship was the 78th staging of the Offaly Senior Hurling Championship since its establishment by the Offaly County Board in 1896.

St Rynagh's entered the championship as the defending champions.

The final, a replay, was played on 26 October 1975 at St Brendan's Park in Birr, between St Rynagh's and Birr, in what was their second consecutive meeting in the final. St Rynagh's won the match by 0–14 to 0–08 to claim their ninth championship title overall and a record-equalling fourth championship title in succession.

== Results ==
=== Final ===
5 October 1975 Final	St Rynagh's	0-05 - 0-05	Birr	St Brendan's Park

=== Final replay ===
26 October 1975 Final	St Rynagh's	0-14 - 0-08	Birr	St Brendan's Park
