= 1972 Offaly Senior Hurling Championship =

Annual hurling competition season

- Champions: St Rynagh's (6th title); Frank Whelahan (captain)
- Runners-up: Kinnitty

The 1972 Offaly Senior Hurling Championship was the 75th staging of the Offaly Senior Hurling Championship since its establishment by the Offaly County Board in 1896.

Birr entered the championship as the defending champions.

The final was played on 26 November 1972 at St Brendan's Park in Birr, between St Rynagh's and Kinnitty, in what was their third meeting in the final in four years. St Rynagh's won the match by 4–10 to 1–06 to claim their sixth championship title overall and a first championship title in two years.

== Results ==
=== Final ===
26 November 1972 Final	St Rynagh's	4-10 - 1-06	Kinnitty	St Brendan's Park
