= Declan Fogarty =

Irish retired sportsperson

Personal information
- Native name: Déaglán Ó Fogartaigh (Irish)
- Born: 10 September 1960 (age 66) Banagher, County Offaly
- Occupation: Teacher
- Height: 5 ft 10 in (178 cm)

Sport
- Sport: Hurling
- Position: Right corner-forward
Club
- Years: Club
- 1970s-1990s: St Rynagh's
Club titles
- offaly titles: 6
- Leinster titles: 2
- All-Ireland Titles: 0
Inter-county
Years	County	Apps (scores)
1983-1988	[offaly	15
Inter-county titles
- Leinster titles: 1
- All-Irelands: 1
- NHL: 0
- All Stars: 0

Declan Fogerty (born 10 September 1960 in Banagher, County Offaly) is an Irish former sportsperson. He played hurling with his local club St Rynagh's and was a member of the Offaly senior inter-county team from 1983 until 1988.
