= 1948 Offaly Senior Hurling Championship =

Annual hurling competition season

- Champions: Birr (14th title)
- Runners-up: Coolderry

The 1948 Offaly Senior Hurling Championship was the 51st staging of the Offaly Senior Hurling Championship since its establishment by the Offaly County Board in 1896.

Coolderry entered the championship as the defending champions.

The final was played on 22 August 1948 at O'Connor Park in Tullamore, between Birr and Coolderry, in what was their second consecutive meeting in the final. Birr won the match by 4–06 to 1–03 to claim their 14th championship title overall and a first championship title in two years.

== Results ==
=== Final ===
22 August 1948 Final	Birr	4-06 - 1-03	Coolderry	O'Connor Park
