= Ballyskenagh GAA =

Gaelic games club in County Tipperary, Ireland

Ballyskenagh
- Baile Sceannach
- Founded: 1925
- County: Offaly
- Colours: Red and black

Playing kits
Standard colours

Senior Club Championships
	All Ireland	Leinster champions	Offaly champions
Hurling:	0	0	0

Ballyskenagh GAA was a Gaelic Athletic Association club located near Roscrea, County Tipperary, Ireland but affiliated to the Offaly County Board. The club was primarily concerned with the game of hurling.

== History ==
Associated with the parish of Roscrea, County Tipperary but geographically situated in County Offaly, the club was formed in 1925 under the name Mount Heaton. The club affiliated to the Offaly County Board and had its first success in 1927 when the Offaly JHC title was claimed. The club remained active until 1940.

After a two-year lapse in activity the club was reformed as Ballyskenagh but affiliated to the North Tipperary Board. The new club won the North Tipperary JHC title in 1948 before winning the title for a second time in 1959. A new bye-law introduced by the Tipperary County Board in 1961 restricted each parish to one hurling and one Gaelic football club resulting in Ballyskenagh being refused affiliation. Later that year, the Offaly County Board agreed to accept affiliation. Success was immediate with the club winning the Offaly JHC title in its first year back in competition in County Offaly.

Ballyskenagh claimed a third Offaly JHC title in 1994, before securing senior status a year later when the club claimed the Offaly IHC title. Ballyskenagh had their first senior success in 2001 when they won the O'Connor Cup. The club reached the Offaly SHC final in 2003 but lost out to Birr by 1–18 to 1–11.

A decade after reaching the SHC final, Ballyskenagh struggled to field teams due to a lack of playing numbers. Because of this the club amalgamated with Killavilla in March 2013 to form the new Ballyskenagh/Killavilla club.

== Achievements ==
- Offaly Intermediate Hurling Championship (3): 1979, 1995, 2008
- Offaly Junior A Hurling Championship (3): 1961, 1977, 1994
- North Tipperary Junior A Hurling Championship (2): 1948, 1959

== Notable players ==
- Pat Cleary: All-Ireland SHC-winner (1985)
- David Franks: All-Ireland SHC runner-up (2000)
- Paddy Kirwan: All-Ireland SHC-winner (1981)
- Brendan Murphy: All-Ireland SHC runner-up (2000)
