= Shane McGuckin =

Irish hurler

Personal information
- Native name: Seán Mag Eochaín (Irish)
- Born: 1969 (age 56–57) Banagher, County Offaly, Ireland
- Occupation: Veterinary surgeon
- Height: 6 ft 0 in (183 cm)

Sport
- Sport: Hurling
- Position: Right corner-back
Clubs
- Years: Club
- St Rynagh's; Naomh Éanna, Gorey
Club titles
- Offaly titles: 4
- Leinster titles: 1
College
- Years: College
- University College Dublin
College titles
- Fitzgibbon titles: 0
Inter-county
Years	County	Apps (scores)
1990-1997	Offaly	14 (0-00)
Inter-county titles
- Leinster titles: 2
- All-Irelands: 1
- NHL: 1
- All Stars: 0

Shane McGuckin (born 1969) is an Irish retired hurler who played for club sides St Rynagh's and Naomh Éanna and at inter-county level with the Offaly senior hurling team.

== Career ==
Born in Banagher, County Offaly, McGuckin first came to prominence on the St. Rynagh's club side that won four County Championship title in six seasons between 1987 and 1993. The last of these was converted into a Leinster Club Championship title. Success at club level saw McGuckin drafted onto the Offaly senior team during the 1990-91 National League. He collected his first silverware with the team in 1994 when Offaly won the Leinster Championship before ending the season as an All-Ireland Championship-winner after a defeat of Limerick in the final. McGuckin won a second successive provincial title the following year before captaining the team for the 1996 season. His son, Charlie McGuckin, has lined out for the Wexford senior hurling team.

== Honours ==
St. Rynagh's

- Leinster Senior Club Hurling Championship: 1993
- Offaly Senior Hurling Championship: 1987, 1990, 1992, 1993

Offaly

- All-Ireland Senior Hurling Championship: 1994
- Leinster Senior Hurling Championship: 1994, 1995
- National Hurling League: 1990-91

Sporting positions
Preceded by Johnny Pilkington	Offaly Senior Hurling Captain; 1996	Succeeded by
