= Killavilla GAA =

GAA club in County Offaly

Killavilla
- Cill an Bhile
- Founded: 1950
- County: Offaly
- Colours: Green, white and gold
- Grounds: Killavilla

Playing kits
Standard colours

Senior Club Championships
	All Ireland	Leinster champions	Offaly champions
Hurling:	0	0	0

Killavilla GAA was a Gaelic Athletic Association club located near Roscrea, County Tipperary, Ireland but affiliated to the Offaly County Board. The club was primarily concerned with the game of hurling.

== History ==
Located just outside Roscrea on the Tipperary-Laois-Offaly border, the club was formed in 1950. The club has operated in the Offaly JHC for the majority of its existence. After claiming their inaugural title in that grade in 1956, Killavilla had further successes in 1988 and 1991. The club secured senior status in 2002 after winning the Offaly IHC title.

A decade after this triumph, Killavilla struggled to field teams due to a lack of playing numbers. Because of this the club amalgamated with Ballyskenagh in March 2013 to form the new Ballyskenagh/Killavilla club.

== Honours ==
- Offaly Intermediate Hurling Championship (1): 2002
- Offaly Junior A Hurling Championship (3): 1956, 1988, 1991

== Notable players ==
- Christy King
