= Andy Gallagher =

Irish hurler (1936–2026)

Personal information
- Native name: Aindriú Ó Gallchóir (Irish)
- Born: September 1936 Tullamore, County Offaly, Ireland
- Died: 14 September 2026 (aged 89) Clara, County Offaly, Ireland
- Occupation: Placement officer

Sport
- Sport: Hurling
- Position: Goalkeeper
Club
- Years: Club
- 1953–1975: Tullamore
Club titles
	Football	Hurling
Offaly titles	3	3
Inter-county*
Years	County	Apps (scores)
1955–1969	Offaly	19 (0–00)
Inter-county titles
- Leinster titles: 0
- All-Irelands: 0
- NHL: 0
- *Inter County team apps and scores correct as of 21:48, 24 January 2018.

Andrew Gallagher (September 1936 – 14 September 2026) was an Irish hurling manager, selector, administrator and player. He played with Tullamore at club level and was the manager of the Offaly team that won the 1981 All-Ireland SHC title, having earlier lined out as goalkeeper with the team. Gallagher is considered one of Offaly's most influential figures.

== Playing career ==
Born and raised in Tullamore, County Offaly, Gallagher was educated at Tullamore CBS. He first played hurling and Gaelic football at juvenile and underage levels with the Tullamore club. Gallagher was in goals when Tullamore won the U16 Hurling Championship in 1952 and captained the club's minor footballers to championship success in 1953 as they won a minor hurling and football double.

Gallagher was still part of the minor team when he won an Offaly IFC title in 1953. He collected his first Offaly SFC medal in 1954, before winning further titles in 1956 and 1963. Gallagher also won three Offaly SHC medals – 1954, 1956 and 1963.

At inter-county level, Gallagher lined out as a dual player at minor level in 1953 and 1954. He later played for the junior football team before making his senior hurling team debut in a National Hurling League game against Roscommon in October 1955. Gallagher made 63 appearances for Offaly until his last game in March 1969. He won a Railway Cup medal with Leinster in 1967.

== Post-playing career ==
In retirement from playing, Gallagher held a number of administrative roles. He held the positions of treasurer and secretary at club level, before serving as treasurer and assistant secretary with the Offaly County Board. Gallagher was also Offaly’s delegate to the Leinster Council for over 30 years until 2009.

Gallagher served as both manager and selector with the Offaly senior hurling team on various occasions over a 20-year period. During that time he was involved in all nine of Offaly's Leinster SHC wins. Gallagher also managed Offaly to their inaugural All-Ireland SHC title in September 1981, following a 2–12 to 0–15 defeat of Galway in the final. He was a selector for further All-Ireland SHC title wins in 1985 and 1994.

== Death ==
Gallagher died on 14 September 2026, at the age of 89.

== Honours ==
=== Player ===
Tullamore

- Offaly Senior Hurling Championship (3): 1955, 1959, 1964
- Offaly Senior Football Championship (3): 1954, 1956, 1963
- Offaly Intermediate Football Championship (1): 1953
- Offaly Junior A Football Championship (1): 1972
- Offaly Minor Football Championship (1): 1953 (c)
- Offaly Minor Hurling Championship (1): 1953
- Offaly Under-16 Hurling Championship (1): 1952

Leinster

- Railway Cup (1): 1967

=== Management ===
Offaly

- All-Ireland Senior Hurling Championship (3): 1981, 1985, 1994
- Leinster Senior Hurling Championship (9): 1980, 1981, 1984, 1985, 1988, 1989, 1990, 1994, 1995
- National Hurling League (1): 1990–91

Sporting positions
Preceded by New position	Offaly Senior Hurling Manager; 1976-1983	Succeeded by Dermot Healy
Achievements
Preceded by Cyril Farrell	All-Ireland SHC final winning manager 1981	Succeeded by Pat Henderson
