= 1965 Offaly Senior Hurling Championship =

Annual hurling competition season

- Champions: St Rynagh's (1st title); Gerry Nallen (captain)
- Runners-up: Coolderry

The 1965 Offaly Senior Hurling Championship was the 68th staging of the Offaly Senior Hurling Championship since its establishment by the Offaly County Board in 1896.

Tullamore entered the championship as the defending champions.

The final was played on 19 September 1965 at St Brendan's Park in Birr, between St Rynagh's and Coolderry, in what was their first ever meeting in the final. St Rynagh's won the match by 2–12 to 1–09 to claim their first ever championship title.

== Results ==
=== Final ===
19 September 1965 Final	St Rynagh's	2-12 - 1-09	Coolderry	St Brendan's Park
