= Pat Cleary =

Irish hurler

Personal information
- Native name: Pádraig Ó Cléirigh (Irish)
- Born: 15 January 1962 (age 64) Shinrone, County Offaly, Ireland
- Occupation: Garda
- Height: 5 ft 11 in (180 cm)

Sport
- Sport: Hurling
- Position: Right corner-forward
Clubs
- Years: Club
- Ballyskenagh; Kilmacud Crokes; Portlaoise
Inter-county*
Years	County	Apps (scores)
1982-1991	Offaly	17 (10-19)
Inter-county titles
- Leinster titles: 3
- All-Irelands: 1
- NHL: 0
- All Stars: 1
- *Inter County team apps and scores correct as of 15:42 4 December 2011.

Pat Cleary (born 15 January 1962) is an Irish retired hurler who played as a right corner-forward for the Offaly senior team.

Cleary made his first appearance for the team during the 1981-82 National Hurling League and became a regular player over the course of the following decade. During that time he won one All-Ireland winner's medal, three Leinster winner's medals and an All-Star award.

At club level Cleary began his career with Ballyskenagh, before later playing with Kilmacud Crokes and Portlaoise. He won numerous county championship winners' medals with the latter two teams.
