= Brian Whelahan =

Offaly hurler (born 1971)

Personal information
- Native name: Brian Ó Faoileacháin (Irish)
- Nickname: Sid/Brian/Bazza/The Millennium Man
- Born: 23 August 1971 (age 55) Banagher, County Offaly, Ireland
- Occupation: Publican
- Height: 5 ft 11 in (180 cm)

Sport
- Sport: Hurling
- Position: Right wing-back
Club
- Years: Club
- 1988–2009: Birr
Club titles
- Offaly titles: 12
- Leinster titles: 7
- All-Ireland Titles: 4
Inter-county*
Years	County	Apps (scores)
1989–2006	Offaly	55 (2–43)
Inter-county titles
- Leinster titles: 3
- All-Irelands: 2
- NHL: 1
- All Stars: 4
- *Inter County team apps and scores correct as of 12:02, 31 October 2013.

Brian Whelahan (born 23 August 1971) is an Irish former hurler who played as a left wing-back at senior level for the Offaly county team.

Born in Banagher, County Offaly, Whelahan first played competitive hurling whilst at school in St Brendan's Community School. He arrived on the inter-county scene at the age of fifteen when he first linked up with the Offaly minor team, before later lining out with the under-21 side. He made his senior debut during the 1989 championship. Whelahan went on to play a key role for Offaly during a hugely successful era for the team, and won two All-Ireland medals, four Leinster medals and one National Hurling League medals. He was an All-Ireland runner-up on two occasions.

As a member of the Leinster inter-provincial team on a number of occasions, Whelahan won two Interprovincial Cup medals. At club level, he won a record four All-Ireland medals with Birr, while he also claimed seven Leinster medals and twelve championship medals.

Throughout his career, Whelahan made 55 championship appearances, second only to Joe Dooley in Offaly's all-time rankings. His retirement came following the conclusion of the 2006 championship.

Whelahan's father, Pad Joe, and his brothers, Simon and Barry, also played with Offaly.

In retirement from playing, Whelahan became involved in team management and coaching. At club level, he took charge of club sides Camross and Kiltormer before serving as manager of the Offaly senior team for a two-year spell.

Whelahan is widely regarded as one of the greatest hurlers in the history of the game. During his playing days, he won four All-Star awards, as well as being the first person to be named Texaco Hurler of the Year on two occasions. He has been repeatedly voted onto teams made up of the sport's greats, including at left wing-back on the Hurling Team of the Millennium in 2000.

== Playing career ==
=== Colleges ===
Whelahan was educated locally at St Brendan's Presentation Brothers National School, where he started off his hurling career under the tutelage of Bro. Vincent and Tony Samson. He later attended St. Brendan's Community School where he joined the school hurling team. Pádraig Horan, Offaly's All-Ireland winning captain of 1981, was the trainer of the team. Whelahan was a substitute on the team that captured both Leinster and All-Ireland titles in 1986.

=== Club ===
In 1991 Whelahan tasted his first success with Birr. As captain of the team he collected his first championship medal following a narrow 1–12 to 1–11 defeat of Seir Kieran. He later added a Leinster medal to his collection following a 2–14 to 0–3 trouncing of Ballyhale Shamrocks. On 29 March 1992 Whelahan lead his team out against Kiltormer at Semple Stadium for the All-Ireland final. A 0–15 to 1–8 defeat was Birr's lot on that occasion.

After a period of decline, Birr bounced back in 1994. A narrow 0–8 to 0–6 defeat of Seir Kieran once again gave Whelahan his second championship medal. The subsequent provincial campaign saw Birr draw 0–10 to 1–7 with Oulart-the Ballagh. Birr won the replay by 3–7 to 2–5, giving Whelahan a second Leinster medal. On 17 March 1995 Whelahan lined out in a second All-Ireland decider, this time with Dunloy providing the opposition. A 0–9 apiece draw was the result on that occasion. The replay was much more conclusive, with Whelahan collecting his first All-Ireland medal following a 3–13 to 2–3 victory.

In 1997 Birr and Seir Kieran renewed their rivalry in the county championship. A 0–14 to 2–4 victory gave Whelahan his third championship medal. He later added a third Leinster medal to his collection following an 0–11 to 0–5 defeat of Castletown. The subsequent All-Ireland final on 17 March 1998 saw Birr take on Sarsfield's of Galway. Darren Hanniffy scored the only goal of the game after just five minutes and gave Birr a lead that they would never surrender. A 1–13 to 0–9 victory gave Whelahan his second All-Ireland medal.

After surrendering their titles later that year, Birr bounced back in 1999. A 3–15 to 1–11 defeat of St. Rynagh's gave Whelahan a fourth championship medal. A subsequent 1–16 to 0–11 defeat of Castletown gave Whelahan a fourth Leinster medal. Birr's All-Ireland quest came to an end with an All-Ireland semi-final defeat by Athenry.

Whelahan won further championship medals in 2000 against Seir Kieran and in 2001 against St. Rynagh's, as Birr retained their status as the kingpins of Offaly hurling. Once again Birr defeated Castletown in the provincial decider to give Whelahan his fifth Leinster medal. Once again Birr qualified for the All-Ireland final on 17 March 2002 with Clarinbridge providing the opposition. A Declan Pilkington goal inside sixty seconds was the perfect start, although the Westerners did recover to lead by 1–4 to 1–2 at the break. With wind advantage, Birr took control and secured a 2–10 to 1–5 victory. It was Whelahan's third All-Ireland medal.

Birr continued their dominance in 2002 with Whelahan winning a seventh championship medal following a 3–12 to 2–7 defeat of Kilcormac/Killoughey. He later added a sixth Leinster medal to his collection following a low-scoring 2–5 to 1–2 defeat of Young Irelands in deplorable conditions. Birr later faced Dunloy in the All-Ireland decider on 17 March 2003. At the third time of asking Birr finally retained the title with a 1–19 to 0–11 victory. It was Whelahan's fourth All-Ireland medal.

In 2003 Birr defeated Ballyskenach by 1–18 to 1–11 to secure their fifth successive county championship. It was Whelahan's eighth championship medal overall.

A record six-in-a-row proved beyond Birr, however, Whelahan won his ninth championship medal in 2005 as his side trounced Coolderry by 0–20 to 0–5.

It was the start of another great run of success for Birr as the club retained their titles in 2006 and 2007. Later that year Whelahan won his seventh and final Leinster medal as Birr narrowly defeated Ballyboden St. Enda's by 1–11 to 0–13. Birr later had the chance to make history by becoming the first club side to win five All-Ireland titles, however, Portumna easily defeated Whelahan's side by 3–19 to 3–9 in the decider.

In 2008 Whelahan won a remarkable twelfth championship medal as Birr defeated Kinnitty by 1–15 to 0–15. It was a fourth successive county title for Birr.

=== Minor and under-21 ===
By the late 1980s Whelahan had earned a call-up to the Offaly minor hurling team. In 1987 he captured a Leinster medal in that grade following a 2–13 to 0–12 victory over Kilkenny. Offaly later played Tipperary in the All-Ireland final. After an exciting hour of hurling Offaly emerged victorious by 2–8 to 0–12, giving Whelahan an All-Ireland Minor Hurling Championship medal. It was Offaly's second minor title ever.

Two years later in 1989 Whelahan was captain of the minor side as he captured a second Leinster medal following a 4–13 to 0–13 trouncing of Kilkenny in a replay. Offaly later lined out against Clare in the All-Ireland final. After an exciting game Offaly were the winners by 2–16 to 1–12, giving Whelahan a second All-Ireland medal in the minor grade.

That same year Whelahan was also a key member of the Offaly under-21 team. He won a Leinster medal in that grade following a 3–16 to 3–9 win over Kilkenny. The subsequent All-Ireland final saw Offaly take on Tipperary. A high-scoring game saw Whelahan's side being defeated by 4–10 to 3–11.

Two years later Whelahan added a second Leinster medal to his collection following a 2–10 to 0–12 defeat of Kilkenny. Galway provided the opposition in the subsequent All-Ireland decider, however, Whelahan's side were completely outclassed, as the men from the West won by 2–17 to 1–9.

The following year Whelahan was captain of the Offaly under-21 team. He added a third Leinster medal to his collection, following a 1–15 to 2–10 defeat of Kilkenny, before later leading his team out in the All-Ireland final. Waterford provided the opposition on that occasion, however, both sides finished level. The replay saw Waterford win the game by 0–12 to 2–3, leaving Whelahan with a third All-Ireland under-21 runners-up medal.

=== Senior ===
Whelahan was still a member of the Offaly minor team when he made his senior championship debut in the All-Ireland semi-final against Antrim on 6 August 1989. Offaly were the hot favourites going into the game, however, victory went to the Ulster men on a score line of 4–15 to 1–15. The significance of this victory was not lost on Offaly team as the entire team gave the Antrim players a guard of honour and a standing ovation as they left the field.

In 1990 Offaly were the masters of Leinster once again, with Whelahan picking up his first Leinster medal following a 1–19 to 2–11 win over Dublin.

At the start of 1991 Offaly reached the final of the National Hurling League. Wexford were the opponents on that occasion, however, after a tense game Offaly secured a 2–6 to 0–10 victory and Whelahan collected a National League medal.

After a few years out of the limelight Offaly bounced back in 1994. That year Whelahan added a second Leinster medal to his collection following a 1–18 to 0–14 victory over Wexford. On 4 September 1994, Whelahan lined out in his first All-Ireland decider in the senior grade. Limerick provided the opposition and were five points ahead with five minutes left in the game. It was then that one of the most explosive All-Ireland final finishes of all-time took place. Offaly were awarded a close-in free which Johnny Dooley stepped up to take. Dooley was told by the management team to take a point; however, he lashed the ball into the Limerick net to reduce the deficit. Following the puck-out Offaly worked the ball up the field and Pat O'Connor struck for a second goal. The Offaly forwards scored another five unanswered points in the time remaining to secure a 3–16 to 2–13 victory. As well as being named man of the match, Whelahan collected an All-Ireland medal. 1994 was not without its controversy for Whelahan either, as he was named Texaco Hurler of the Year but, due to irregularities in the voting system, he was sensationally omitted from the All-Star team.

In 1995 Offaly retained the provincial title following a 2–16 to 2–5 trouncing of Kilkenny, giving Whelahan a third Leinster medal. On 3 September 1995, he lined out in a second consecutive All-Ireland decider, this time with Clare providing the opposition. It was the first ever meeting of these two sides in the history of the championship. The game developed into a close affair with Offaly taking a half-time lead. Four minutes from the end substitute Éamonn Taaffe first timed a long range free straight into the net to give Clare a one-point lead. After a quick equaliser Anthony Daly sent over a 65-metre free to give his team the lead again. Jamesie O'Connor pointed soon afterwards and at the full-time whistle Clare were the 1–13 to 2–8 winners.

In 1998 Offaly had another controversial year. Whelahan's side reached the Leinster final but lost to Kilkenny. This defeat prompted their manager, Babs Keating, to describe the Offaly hurlers as "sheep in a heap", and he promptly resigned. It looked as if Offaly's championship hopes were in disarray, however, they overcame Antrim in the All-Ireland quarter-final and qualified to meet Clare in the semi-final. The first game against Clare ended in a 1–13 apiece draw and had to be replayed, however, the replay was ended early because of a time-keeping error by the referee. Following a protest on the pitch of Croke Park by the Offaly supporters it was decided that the result would not stand and that Clare and Offaly would meet for a third time. Whelahan's side won the third game and qualified to play Kilkenny in the All-Ireland final on 13 September 1998. On that day Whelahan delivered one of his greatest ever performances. Despite suffering from flu, he started in defence and was later moved to full-forward where he scored 1–6. Offaly reversed the Leinster final defeat by winning the All-Ireland final by 2–16 to 1–13. Whelahan had captured his second All-Ireland medal and was once again honoured as Texaco Hurler of the Year, the first player to win the title on two occasions.

Offaly were now in decline, however, they were still regarded as a force in the championship. The team reached the All-Ireland final on 10 September 2000 via the "back door" once again, where they faced Kilkenny. In one of the most one-sided finals in years, Offaly were trounced by 5–15 to 1–14.

The following six years proved disappointing for Whelahan and for Offaly with no Leinster or All-Ireland titles being won. Following a loss to Clare in the 2006 All-Ireland qualifiers, Whelahan decided to retire from inter-county hurling.

=== Inter-provincial ===
Whelahan also lined out with Leinster in the inter-provincial hurling championship and enjoyed much success. He won his first Railway Cup medal in 1998 as Leinster narrowly defeated Connacht by 0–16 to 2–9. A second Railway Cup winners' medal followed in 2004.

== Managerial career ==
=== Club ===
In 2009 Whelahan made the leap to team management when he took over as manager of the Laois club side Camross. His two-year tenure saw some progress, however, Camross were defeated by Rathdowney-Errill in the 2010 championship decider.

Whelahan took over as manager of Galway-based Kiltormer in 2012. Once again, his two-year term in charge yielded little in terms of success.

=== Offaly ===
On 23 October 2013, it was announced that Whelahan was set to take over from Ollie Baker as the Offaly senior hurling manager following his recommendation for the role by the senior hurling manager selection committee. His tenure got off to a difficult start as Offaly were trounced by Kilkenny in Nowlan Park in the opening round of the Leinster Senior Hurling Championship. A tight win in round one of the qualifiers against Antrim saw them go through to the next round against Tipperary. Tipp proved too strong for Whelahan's team and his first season in charge of the senior team had come to an end. Whelahan was re-appointed for a second year in charge of the Offaly hurlers on 30 October 2014.

== Political involvement ==
In 2009 Whelahan was selected as a Fine Gael candidate for Offaly County Council in the local elections. In spite of a high-profile campaign, Whelahan failed to be elected. In spite of this, Whelahan was elected to Birr Town Council.

== Personal life ==
Born in Banagher, County Offaly, Whelahan was born into a family that had a strong association with hurling. His father, Pat Joe Whelahan, played with Offaly for thirteen years and won ten county championship medals with St Rynagh's, while his mother played camogie with Offaly and Leinster.

After leaving school Whelahan worked for Tullamore Frozen Foods for twelve years. In 1994 he later bought a pub in Birr. That same year Whelahan married his wife Mary and together they have four children – Aaron, Dawn, Aoibhe and Brooke.

== Honours ==
=== Team ===
Birr

- All-Ireland Senior Club Hurling Championship (4): 1995, 1998, 2002, 2003
- Leinster Senior Club Hurling Championship (7): 1991, 1994, 1997, 1999, 2001, 2002, 2007
- Offaly Senior Hurling Championship (12): 1991 (c), 1994, 1997, 1999, 2000, 2001, 2002, 2003, 2005, 2006, 2007, 2008

Offaly

- All-Ireland Senior Hurling Championship (2): 1994, 1998
- Leinster Senior Hurling Championship (3): 1990, 1994, 1995
- National Hurling League (1): 1990–91
- Walsh Cup (3): 1990, 1993, 1994
- Leinster Under-21 Hurling Championship (3): 1989, 1991, 1992
- All-Ireland Minor Hurling Championship (2): 1987, 1989
- Leinster Minor Hurling Championship (2): 1987, 1989

Leinster

- Railway Cup (2): 1998, 2004

=== Individual ===
Awards

- Hurling Team of the Millennium: Left wing-back
- Leinster Hurling Team of the Last 25 Years (1984–2009): Ring wing-back
- Texaco Hurler of the Year (2): 1994, 1998
- All-Stars (4): 1992, 1995, 1998, 1999
- GAA Hall of Fame Inductee: 2013
- In May 2020, a public poll conducted by RTÉ.ie named Whelahan in the half-back line alongside Pádraic Maher and Tommy Walsh in a team of hurlers who had won All Stars during the era of The Sunday Game.
- Also in May 2020, the Irish Independent named Whelahan at number three in its "Top 20 hurlers in Ireland over the past 50 years".

Achievements
Preceded by Patsy Brophy (Kilkenny)	All-Ireland MHC winning captain 1989	Succeeded by James McDermott (Kilkenny)
Awards
Preceded by D. J. Carey (Kilkenny)	Texaco Hurler of the Year; 1994	Succeeded by Seánie McMahon (Clare)
Preceded by Jamesie O'Connor (Clare)	Texaco Hurler of the Year; 1998	Succeeded by Brian Corcoran (Cork)
Sporting positions
Preceded by Hubert Rigney	Offaly Senior Hurling Captain; 1999	Succeeded by Johnny Dooley
Preceded by Ollie Baker	Offaly Senior Hurling Manager; 2013–2015	Succeeded by Éamonn Kelly
