= Barry Teehan =

Offaly hurler

Personal information
- Native name: Barra Ó Tadháin (Irish)
- Born: 1982 (age 43–44) Coolderry, County Offaly, Ireland

Sport
- Sport: Hurling
- Position: Midfield
Club
- Years: Club
- Coolderry
Club titles
- Offaly titles: 5
- Leinster titles: 1
Inter-county*
Years	County	Apps (scores)
2001–2008	Offaly	19 (0–1)
Inter-county titles
- Leinster titles: 0
- All-Irelands: 0
- NHL: 0
- All Stars: 0
- *Inter County team apps and scores correct as of 18:07, 9 December 2012.

Baz Teehan (born 1982) is an Irish hurler who played as a midfielder at senior level for the Offaly county team.

Teehan joined the team during the 2001 National League and immediately became a regular member of the starting fifteen. During his inter-county playing days Offaly enjoyed little success and, apart from a National League (Division 2) winners' title, the Offaly team failed to land any honours in the championship. Teehan retired from inter-county hurling prior to the 2008 championship.

At club level Teehan is a Leinster winners' medalist and a five-time county club championship winners' medalist with Coolderry.

Teehan has been an Offaly hurling selector.

Sporting positions
Preceded by Gary Hanniffy	Offaly Senior Hurling Captain; 2005	Succeeded by Brendan Murphy
