= 1966 Offaly Senior Hurling Championship =

Annual hurling competition season

- Champions: St Rynagh's (2nd title); Gerry Nallen (captain)
- Runners-up: Drumcullen

The 1966 Offaly Senior Hurling Championship was the 69th staging of the Offaly Senior Hurling Championship since its establishment by the Offaly County Board in 1896.

St Rynagh's entered the championship as the defending champions.

The final was played on 13 November 1966 at St Brendan's Park in Birr, between St Rynagh's and Drumcullen, in what was their first ever meeting in the final. St Rynagh's won the match by 6–10 to 4–05 to claim their second championship title.

== Results ==
=== Final ===
13 November 1966 Final	St Rynagh's	6-10 - 4-05	Drumcullen	St Brendan's Park
