= 1973 Offaly Senior Hurling Championship =

Annual hurling competition season

- Champions: St Rynagh's (7th title); Basil Johnson (captain)
- Runners-up: Drumcullen

The 1973 Offaly Senior Hurling Championship was the 76th staging of the Offaly Senior Hurling Championship since its establishment by the Offaly County Board in 1896.

St Rynagh's entered the championship as the defending champions.

The final was played on 28 October 1973 at St Brendan's Park in Birr, between St Rynagh's and Drumcullen, in what was their second meeting in the final in overall. St Rynagh's won the match by 0–12 to 1–07 to claim their seventh championship title overall and a second championship title in succession.

== Results ==
=== Final ===
28 October 1973 Final	St Rynagh's	0-12 - 1-07	Drumcullen	St Brendan's Park
