= Ballina James Stephens Hurling Club =

Gaelic games club in County Mayo, Ireland

James Stephens
- Séamus Stíofán
- Founded: 2005
- County: Mayo
- Colours
- Grounds: James Stephens Park, Ballina

Playing kits
Standard colours

Senior Club Championships
	All Ireland	Connacht champions	Mayo champions
Hurling:	0	0	1

James Stephens GAA club is a Gaelic Athletic Association club located in Ballina, County Mayo, Ireland. The club was founded in 2005 and is exclusively concerned with the game of hurling.

== Honours ==
- Mayo Senior Hurling Championship (1): 2007
