= Paddy Kirwan (hurler) =

Irish hurling manager and former player

Personal information
- Native name: Pádraig Ó Ciarubháin (Irish)
- Born: 1958 (age 67–68) Ballyskenagh, County Offaly, Ireland
- Occupation: Taxi driver
- Height: 6 ft 1 in (185 cm)

Sport
- Sport: Hurling
- Position: Right wing-forward
Clubs
- Years: Club
- Ballyskenagh; Birr
Club titles
- Offaly titles: 1
- Leinster titles: 1
- All-Ireland Titles: 0
Inter-county
Years	County	Apps (scores)
1978-1987	Offaly	15 (1-19)
Inter-county titles
- Leinster titles: 3
- All-Irelands: 1
- NHL: 0
- All Stars: 0

Patrick Kirwan (born 1958) is an Irish hurling manager, selector and former player. AT club level, he played with Ballyskenagh and Birr and at inter-county level with the Offaly senior hurling team.

== Playing career ==
Kirwan first played hurling at juvenile and underage levels with the Ballyskenagh club. He was just out of the minor grade when he won an Offaly JAHC medal in 1977. This was followed by an Offaly IHC title two years later. Kirwan transferred to the Birr club and lined out in goal when he won an Offaly SHC in 1991. This was converted into a Leinster Club SHC title, however, Birr were later beaten by Kiltormer in the 1992 All-Ireland Club SHC final.

At inter-county level, Kirwan first played for Offaly during a two-year tenure with the minor team. He later spent two years with the under-21 team and won a Leinster U21HC medal in 1978. Fogarty made his senior team debut in a National Hurling League game against Clare in October 1978.

Kirwan was part of the Offaly team that beat Kilkenny to win their inaugural Leinster SHC title in 1980. He claimed a second consecutive Leinster SHC title the following year, before lining out at wing-forward in Offaly's 2–12 to 0–15 win over Galway in the 1981 All-Ireland SHC final. After winning a third Leinster SHC medal, Kirwan came on as a substitute in Offaly's defeat by Crk in the 1984 All-Ireland SHC final. He played his 60th and final game for Offaly in March 1987.

== Management career ==
Kirwan's management career began with the Ballyskenagh club. He managed the team to consecutive promotions by winning the Offaly JAHC title in 1994 and the Offaly IHC title in 1995. Kirwan's first inter-county management position was with the Offaly minor team who won the Leinster MHC title in 2000. Back at club level the following year, he managed Castletown to their third successive Laois SHC title.

Kirwan returned to the inter-county scene when he was appointed as a selector as part of Mike McNamara's management team in 2002. There were also stints in charge of Kilcormac–Killoughey and Roscrea around this time, before leading Drumcullen to the Offaly IHC title in 2010. Kirwan was appointed Offaly under-21 team manager in January 2011. He was part of Joachim Kelly's Offaly senior management team in 2019.

== Honours ==
=== Player ===
Birr

- Leinster Senior Club Hurling Championship (1): 1991
- Offaly Senior Hurling Championship (1): 1991

Offaly

- All-Ireland Senior Hurling Championship (1): 1981
- Leinster Senior Hurling Championship (3): 1980, 1981, 1984
- Leinster Under-21 Hurling Championship (1): 1978

=== Management ===
Ballyskenagh

- Offaly Intermediate Hurling Championship (1): 1995
- Offaly Junior A Hurling Championship (1): 1994

Castletown

- Laois Senior Hurling Championship (1): 2001

Drumcullen

- Offaly Intermediate Hurling Championship (1): 2010

Offaly

- Leinster Minor Hurling Championship (1): 2000
