= Henry Kilmartin =

Irish hurler

Personal information
- Native name: Anraí Mac Giolla Mhartain (Irish)
- Born: 1 February 1972 (age 54) Kilcormac, County Offaly, Ireland
- Occupation: Block layer

Sport
- Sport: Hurling
- Position: Right corner-back
Club
- Years: Club
- Kilcormac–Killoughey
Club titles
- Offaly titles: 0
Inter-county
Years	County	Apps (scores)
1992-1993	Offaly	0 (0-00)
Inter-county titles
- Leinster titles: 0
- All-Irelands: 0
- NHL: 0
- All Stars: 0

Henry Kilmartin (born 1 February 1972) is an Irish former hurler. At club level, he played with Kilcormac–Killoughey and at inter-county level with the Offaly senior hurling team.

== Career ==
Kilmartin first played for club side Kilcormac–Killoughey at juvenile and underage levels before progressing to adult level. In 2002, he captained Kilcormac–Killoughey to a 3–11 to 2–07 defeat by Birr, in what was the club's first appearance in a final.

At inter-county level, Kilmartin first played for Offaly as a member of the minor team. He was an unused substitute when Offaly beat Clare by 2–16 to 1–12 in the 1989 All-Ireland MHC final. Kilmartin later progressed to the under-21 team and won consecutive Leinster U21HC medals in 1991 and 1992, however, these provincial wins were subsequently followed by consecutive All-Ireland U21HC final defeats. Kilmartin made his senior team debut in a National Hurling League game against Limerick in March 1993.

== Honours ==
Offaly

- Leinster Under-21 Hurling Championship (2): 1991, 1992
- All-Ireland Minor Hurling Championship (1): 1989
- Leinster Minor Hurling Championship (1): 1989
