= 1946 Offaly Senior Hurling Championship =

Annual hurling competition season

- Champions: Birr (13th title)
- Runners-up: Tullamore

The 1946 Offaly Senior Hurling Championship was the 49th staging of the Offaly Senior Hurling Championship since its establishment by the Offaly County Board in 1896.

Coolderry entered the championship as the defending champions.

The final was played on 13 October 1946 at St Brendan's Park in Birr, between Birr and Tullamore, in what was their third meeting in the final overall. Birr won the match by 6–09 to 2–03 to claim their 13th championship title overall and a third championship title in four years.

== Results ==
=== Final ===
13 October 1946 Final	Birr	6-09 - 2-03	Tullamore	St Brendan's Park
