= Luke Watkins (hurler) =

Irish hurler

Personal information
- Native name: Lúc Mac Uaitcín (Irish)
- Born: 2003 (age 22–23) Shinrone, County Offaly, Ireland
- Occupation: Student

Sport
- Sport: Hurling
- Position: Right wing-back
Club
- Years: Club
- 2008-present: Shinrone
Club titles
- Offaly titles: 1
College
- Years: College
- 2022-present: TUS Midwest
College titles
- Fitzgibbon titles: 0
Inter-county*
Years	County	Apps (scores)
2023	Offaly	6
Inter-county titles
- Leinster titles: 0
- All-Irelands: 0
- NHL: 0
- All Stars: 0
- *Inter County team apps and scores correct as of 12:35, 3 June 2024.

Luke Watkins (born 2003) is an Irish hurler. At club level he plays with Shinrone and at inter-county level with the Offaly senior hurling team.

== Career ==
Watkins first played hurling to a high standard as a student at Roscrea Community College. After progressing through the juvenile and underage ranks with Shinrone GAA club Watkins won an Offaly SHC medal after a defeat of Kilcormac–Killoughey in the 2022 final.

Watkins first appeared on the inter-county scene during a spell with the Offaly minor hurling team, which culminated with a defeat by Kilkenny in the 2020 Leinster minor final. He immediately progressed to the under-20 team and was at wing-back when they lost the 2023 All-Ireland under-20 final to Cork.

Watkins made his senior team debut in a defeat by Cork in the 2024 National Hurling League.

== Honours ==
Shinrone

- Offaly Senior Hurling Championship: 2022

Offaly

- Leinster Under-20 Hurling Championship: 2023
