= 1969 Offaly Senior Hurling Championship =

Annual hurling competition season

- Champions: St Rynagh's (4th title); Damien Martin (captain)
- Runners-up: Kinnitty; Percy Clendennen (captain)

The 1969 Offaly Senior Hurling Championship was the 72nd staging of the Offaly Senior Hurling Championship since its establishment by the Offaly County Board in 1896.

St Rynagh's entered the championship as the defending champions.

The final was played on 12 October 1969 at St Brendan's Park in Birr, between St Rynagh's and Kinnitty, in what was their first ever meeting in the final. St Rynagh's won the match by 4–07 to 1–09 to claim their fourth championship title overall and a second championship title in succession.

== Results ==
=== Final ===
12 October 1969 Final	St Rynagh's	4-07 - 1-09	Kinnitty	St Brendan's Park
