= 1970 Offaly Senior Hurling Championship =

Annual hurling competition season

- Champions: St Rynagh's (5th title); Ray Horan (captain)
- Runners-up: Kinnitty

The 1970 Offaly Senior Hurling Championship was the 73rd staging of the Offaly Senior Hurling Championship since its establishment by the Offaly County Board in 1896.

St Rynagh's entered the championship as the defending champions.

The final was played on 25 October 1970 at St Brendan's Park in Birr, between St Rynagh's and Kinnitty, in what was their second consecutive meeting in the final. St Rynagh's won the match by 1–12 to 2–08 to claim their fifth championship title overall and a third championship title in succession.

== Results ==
=== Semi-finals ===
4 October 1970 Semi-final	Kinnitty	4-12 - 2-05	Shinrone	St Brendan's Park
	J Flaherty 1-7, M Cleere 1-1, J Grimes 0-4, M Flaherty 1-0, M Dempsey 1-0. J Flaherty 1-8, M Flaherty 1-0, M Dempsey 1-0, M Grimes 0-1.		J McKenna 2-4, T Brooks 0-1.

4 October 1970 Semi-final	St Rynagh's	2-17 - 3-10	Drumcullen	St Brendan's Park
	P Mulhaire 0-6, B Moylan 0-6, S Burke 1-2, R Horan 1-1, B Lyons 0-1, P Moylan 0-1.		P Molloy 0-8, MJ Mannion 2-1, B Barry 1-0, J O'Brien 0-1.

=== Final ===
25 October 1970 Final	St Rynagh's	1-12 - 2-08	Kinnitty	St Brendan's Park
	B Boylan 0-6, R Horan 1-1, P Mulhaire 0-2, M Hough 0-2, M Moylan 0-1.		M Dempsey 2-0, M Cleere 0-2, J Flaherty 0-2, J Egan 0-1, M Delaney 0-1, M Corrigan 0-1, P Spain 0-1.
