= Barney Moylan =

Irish hurler

Personal information
- Native name: Brian Ó Maoileáin (Irish)
- Born: 1943 Banagher, County Offaly, Ireland
- Died: 29/11/2023
- Occupation: Bord na Móna worker

Sport
- Sport: Hurling
- Position: Right wing-forward
Club
- Years: Club
- 1961-1976: St Rynagh's
Club titles
- Offaly titles: 10
- Leinster titles: 2
- All-Ireland Titles: 0
Inter-county
Years	County	Apps (scores)
1965-1976	Offaly	17 (7-64)
Inter-county titles
- Leinster titles: 0
- All-Irelands: 0
- NHL: 0
- All Stars: 0

Barney Moylan (born 1943) is an Irish former hurler who played as a right wing-forward for the Offaly senior hurling team.

Moylan made his first appearance for the team during the 1965 championship and was a regular member of the starting fifteen until his retirement after the 1976 championship. During that time he experienced little success with the team. Moylan was a Leinster runner-up on one occasion in 1969, where he marked Eddie Keher scoreless from play.

At club level Moylan was a two-time Leinster medalist with St Rynagh's. In addition to this he has also won nine county club championship medals.

== Playing career ==
=== Club ===
Moylan enjoyed much success with St Rynagh's in a club career that spanned two decades.

In 1965 Moylan won his first championship medal in the senior grade as a defeat of Coolderry earned St Rynagh's their first ever championship title. Further success followed in 1966 as St Rynagh's retained the Seán Robbins Cup.

After missing St Rynagh's championship triumph in 1968, Moylan was back in 1969 and won a third championship medal before winning a fourth the following year. In 1970 he added a Leinster medal to his collection following a 4-10 to 2-9 defeat of Rathnure. St Rynagh's later faced Roscrea in the inaugural All-Ireland final, however, Moylan's side were defeated by 4-5 to 2-5.

Four county championships-in-a-row proved beyond St Rynagh's; however, the club bounced back in 1972. A defeat of Kinnitty in the county decider kick-started a remarkable run of success that yielded a record-breaking five championships in succession, bring his medal tally to nine. As well as this Moylan collected a second Leinster medal in 1972 as St Rynagh's narrowly defeated old rivals Rathnure by 5-5 to 2-13.

=== Inter-county ===
Moylan made his first senior championship appearance for Offaly in a provincial defeat of Carlow in 1965. He subsequently became a regular, however, Offaly were one of the minnows of the Leinster series as Kilkenny and Wexford dominated.

In 1969 Offaly reached their first ever Leinster decider with Moylan lining out at right wing-back. Kilkenny provided the opposition on that occasion. Many expected Offaly to be wiped out by "the Cats", however, the game was a lot closer than people expected. Kilkenny's goal-scoring abilities proved the key to success as they won by 3-9 to 0-16.

The rest of Moylan's career brought little success and he retired from inter-county hurling after a championship defeat by Westmeath in 1976.

=== Inter-provincial ===
Moylan also had the honour of being selected for Leinster in the inter-provincial series of games and experienced much success.

After winning his first Railway Cup medal as an unused substitute in 1971, Moylan made it onto the starting fifteen of the team the following year. Leinster defeated Munster by 3-12 to 1-10 on that occasion and Moylan won his first medal on the field of play.

In 1973 Leinster reached the decider and faced Munster once again. Moylan was introduced as a substitute and won another Railway Cup medal following a narrow 1-13 to 2-8 victory.

== Honours ==
=== Team ===
St Rynagh's

- Leinster Senior Club Hurling Championship (2): 1970, 1973
- Offaly Senior Club Hurling Championship (9): 1965, 1966, 1969, 1970, 1972, 1973, 1974, 1975, 1976

Leinster

- Railway Cup (3): 1971, 1972, 1973
