= Darren Hanniffy =

Irish hurler

Personal information
- Native name: Darrin Ó hAinifidh (Irish)
- Born: 1974 (age 51–52) Birr, County Offaly, Ireland
- Occupation: Senior manager at GOAL

Sport
- Sport: Hurling
- Position: Centre-forward
Club
- Years: Club
- Birr
Club titles
- Offaly titles: 1
- Leinster titles: 1
- All-Ireland Titles: 1
Inter-county
Years	County	Apps (scores)
1998	Offaly	4 (0-1)
Inter-county titles
- Leinster titles: 0
- All-Irelands: 1
- NHL: 0
- All Stars: 0

Darren Hanniffy (born 1974) is an Irish hurler who played as a midfielder for the Offaly senior team.

Brother of Offaly hurlers Gary and Rory, Hanniffy joined the team during the 1998 National League and was a regular member of the team for just one season. During that time he won one All-Ireland winners' medal on the field of play.

At club level Hanniffy is a one-time All-Ireland, Leinster and county club championship medalist with Birr.
