= Rory Hanniffy =

Irish hurler (born 1982)

Personal information
- Native name: Ruairí Ó hAinbhith (Irish)
- Born: Birr, County Offaly, Ireland
- Occupation: Barrister

Sport
- Sport: Hurling
- Position: Centre-back
Club
- Years: Club
- 2000-present: Birr
Club titles
- Offaly titles: 8
- Leinster titles: 3
- All-Ireland Titles: 2
Inter-county*
Years	County	Apps (scores)
2001-2014	Offaly	45 (4-41)
Inter-county titles
- Leinster titles: 0
- All-Irelands: 0
- NHL: 0
- All Stars: 0
- *Inter County team apps and scores correct as of 21:08, 13 November 2014.

Rory G. Hanniffy (born 1982) is an Irish hurler who played as a centre-back for the Offaly senior team.

Born in Birr, County Offaly, Hanniffy first played competitive hurling during his schooling at Birr Community School. He arrived on the inter-county scene at the age of seventeen when he first linked up with the Offaly minor team before later joining the under-21 side. He made his senior debut during the 2001 National Hurling League. Hanniffy went on to enjoy a lengthy career, winning two National League (Division 2) medals.

As a member of the Leinster inter-provincial team on a number of occasions, Hanniffy won six Railway Cup medals. At club level he is a two-time All-Ireland medallist with Birr. In addition to this he also won three Leinster medals and six championship medals.

Throughout his career Hanniffy made 45 championship appearances. He announced his retirement from inter-county hurling on 12 November 2014.

Hanniffy's father, Declan, and his brothers, Darren and Rory, also played with Offaly.

Hanniffy was honoured by his former colleagues on the midland circuit at a dinner in Dublin's prestigious Westin Hotel on the 9th of June 2023. A record attendance was expected to wish him well in his new role.

== Honours ==
=== Team ===
Birr

- All-Ireland Senior Club Hurling Championship (2): 2002, 2003
- Leinster Senior Club Hurling Championship (3): 2001, 2002, 2007
- Offaly Senior Club Hurling Championship (8): 2000, 2001, 2002, 2003, 2005, 2006, 2007, 2008 (c)

Offaly

- National Hurling League (Division 2) (1): 2005, 2009
- Leinster Under-21 Hurling Championship (1): 2000
- Leinster Minor Hurling Championship (1): 2000

Leinster

- Railway Cup (5): 2003, 2006, 2008, 2009, 2012

=== Individual ===
Honours

- Offaly Hurler of the Year (1): 2006

Sporting positions
Preceded by Brendan Murphy	Offaly Senior Hurling Captain; 2007	Succeeded by Kevin Brady
