= David Franks (hurler) =

Irish hurler

Personal information
- Native name: Daithí Ó Proinnsias (Irish)
- Born: 1979 (age 46–47) Ballyskenagh, County Offaly, Ireland

Sport
- Sport: Hurling
- Position: Left corner-back
Clubs
- Years: Club
- Ballyskenagh; Carrickshock
Inter-county
- Years: County
- 2000–2012: Offaly

David Franks (born 1979) is an Irish hurling coach and former player. He has been lead coach of the Wexford senior hurlers since 2023. Franks played as a centre-back for the Offaly senior team until November 2012.

== Playing career ==
Franks made his senior inter-county debut for Offaly during the 2000 championship and was a regular member of the starting fifteen until his retirement after the 2012 championship. He was the last Offaly player from the 2000 All-Ireland Senior Hurling Championship final to retire. During his inter-county career Franks won two National League (Division 2) medals. Franks was an All-Ireland SHC runner-up on one occasion.

After retiring from inter-county hurling, Franks continued to play the game at club level.

Franks plays with Carrickshock in Kilkenny. He began his career with Ballyskenagh.

== Coaching career ==
Franks was involved as a coach when Waterford GAA club Ballygunner won the 2022 All-Ireland Club SHC title. In August 2023, he joined Keith Rossiter's management team with the Wexford senior hurlers as "lead coach".
