= Simon Whelehan =

Irish hurler (born 1976)

Personal information
- Native name: Síomón Ó Faoileacháin (Irish)
- Born: 27 July 1976 (age 50) Birr, County Offaly, Ireland
- Height: 5 ft 7 in (170 cm)

Sport
- Sport: Hurling
- Position: Full-back
Club
- Years: Club
- Birr
Club titles
- Offaly titles: 10
- Leinster titles: 5
- All-Ireland Titles: 3
Inter-county
Years	County	Apps (scores)
1998-2004	Offaly	25 (0-19)
Inter-county titles
- Leinster titles: 0
- All-Irelands: 1
- NHL: 0
- All Stars: 0

Simon Whelehan (born 27 July 1976) is an Irish hurler who played as a full-back for the Offaly senior hurling team.

Whelehan made his first appearance for the team during the 1998 championship and subsequently became a regular member of the starting fifteen until his retirement after the 2004 championship. During that time he won one All-Ireland medal. Whelehan was an All-Ireland runner-up on one occasion.

At club level Whelehan is a three-time All-Ireland medalist with Birr. In addition to this he has also won five Leinster medals and ten county club championship medals.

Whelehan's father, Pad Joe, and his brothers, Brian and Barry, also played hurling with Offaly.

== Playing career ==
=== Club ===
Whelehan plays his club hurling with Birr and has enjoyed much success during a lengthy career.

By 1997 Whelehan was a regular member of the starting fifteen. That year he won his first county championship medal following a 0–14 to 2–4 defeat of Seir Kieran. He later added a Leinster medal to his collection following an 0–11 to 0–5 defeat of Castletown. The subsequent All-Ireland final saw Birr take on Sarsfield's of Galway. Darren Hanniffy scored the only goal of the game after just five minutes and gave Birr a lead that they would never surrender. A 1–13 to 0–9 victory gave Whelehan his first All-Ireland medal.

After surrendering their titles the following year, Birr bounced back in 1999. A 3–15 to 1–11 defeat of St. Rynagh's gave Whelehan a second championship medal. A subsequent 1–16 to 0–11 defeat of Castletown gave Whelehan a second Leinster medal.

Whelehan won further championship medals in 2000 and 2001 as Birr retained their status as the kingpins of Offaly hurling. Once again Birr defeated Castletown in the provincial decider to give Whelehan his third Leinster medal. Once again Birr qualified for the All-Ireland final with Clarinbridge providing the opposition. A Declan Pilkington goal inside sixty seconds was the perfect start, although the Westerners did recover to lead by 1–4 to 1 -2 at the break. With wind advantage, Birr took control and secured a 2–10 to 1–5 victory. It was Whelehan's second All-Ireland medal, his first as captain.

Birr continued their dominance in 2002 with Whelehan winning a fifth championship medal following a 3–12 to 2–7 defeat of Kilcormac-Killoughey. He later added a fourth Leinster medal to his collection following a 2–5 to 1–2 defeat of Young Irelands in deplorable conditions. Birr later faced Dunloy in the All-Ireland decider. At the third time of asking Birr finally retained the title with a 1–19 to 0–11 victory. It was Whelehan's third All-Ireland medal.

In 2003 Birr defeated Ballyskenach by 1–18 to 1–11 to secure their fifth successive county championship. It was Whelehan's sixth championship medal.

A record six-in-a-row proved beyond Birr, however, Whelehan won his seventh championship medal in 2005 as his side beatCoolderry by 0–20 to 0–5.

It was the start of another great run of success for Birr as the club retained their titles in 2006 and 2007. Later that year Whelehan won his fifth and final Leinster medal as Birr narrowly defeated Ballyboden St. Enda's by 1–11 to 0–13. Birr later had the chance to make history by becoming the first club side to win five All-Ireland titles, however, Portumna easily defeated Whelehan's side by 3–19 to 3–9 in the decider.

In 2008 Whelehan won a tenth championship medal as Birr defeated Kinnitty by 1–15 to 0–15. It was a fourth successive county title for Birr.

=== Inter-county ===
Whelehan made his senior debut for Offaly in a Leinster championship game against Meath in 1998. He played no part in Offaly's subsequent provincial final defeat by Kilkenny. This defeat prompted the Offaly manager, Babs Keating, to describe the team as "sheep in a heap", and he promptly resigned. It looked as if Offaly's championship hopes were in disarray, however, they overcame Antrim in the All-Ireland quarter-final and qualified to meet Clare in the semi-final. The first game ended in a draw and had to be replayed, however, the replay was ended early because of a time-keeping error by the referee Jimmy Cooney. Following a protest on the pitch of Croke Park by the Offaly supporters it was decided that Clare and Offaly would meet for a third time. Whelehan's side won the third game and qualified to play Kilkenny in the final. On that day Brian Whelahan delivered one of his greatest-ever Offaly performances, scoring 1–6. Offaly reversed the Leinster final defeat by winning the All-Ireland final by 2–13 to 1–16. It was Whelehan's first All-Ireland medal.

Offaly surrendered their All-Ireland crown the following year but returned to the All-Ireland decider again in 2000 in a repeat of the Leinster final. Kilkenny's D.J. Carey capitalised on an Offaly mistake after just six minutes to start a goal-fest for "the Cats". Carey scored 2–4 in all, sharing his second goal with Henry Shefflin who also scored a goal in the second-half. At the full-time whistle Kilkenny were the champions by 5–15 to 1–14.

The following few seasons proved difficult as Kilkenny went on to dominate the provincial championship. Whelehan decided to retire from inter-county hurling after the 2004 championship.

=== Inter-provincial ===
Whelehan also lined out with Leinster in the inter-provincial series of games. He won a Railway Cup medal in 1998 as Leinster narrowly defeated Connacht by 0–16 to 2–9.

== Honours ==
=== As a player ===
Birr

- All-Ireland Senior Club Hurling Championship (3): 1998, 2002, 2003
- Leinster Senior Club Hurling Championship (5): 1997, 1999, 2001, 2002, 2007
- Offaly Senior Club Hurling Championship (10): 1997, 1999, 2000, 2001, 2002, 2003, 2005, 2006, 2007, 2008

Offaly

- All-Ireland Senior Hurling Championship (1): 1998

Leinster

- Railway Cup (1): 1998

Achievements
Preceded by Joe Rabbitte (Athenry)	All-Ireland Senior Club Hurling Final winning captain 2002	Succeeded by Gary Hanniffy (Birr)
