= Pat Moylan (Offaly hurler) =

Irish hurler

Personal information
- Native name: Pádraig Ó Maoileáin (Irish)
- Born: Banagher, County Offaly, Ireland

Sport
- Sport: Hurling
- Position: Right wing-back
Club
- Years: Club
- St Rynagh's
Club titles
- Leinster titles: 2
Inter-county*
Years	County	Apps (scores)
1967-1973	Offaly	5 (0-00)
Inter-county titles
- Leinster titles: 0
- All-Irelands: 0
- NHL: 0
- All Stars: 0
- *Inter County team apps and scores correct as of 18:46, 30 June 2014.

Pat Moylan is an Irish former hurler who played as a right wing-back at senior level for the Offaly county team.

Born in Banagher, County Offaly, Moylan first played competitive hurling in his youth. He made his senior debut with Offaly during the 1966-67 National League and immediately became a regular member of the team. During his brief career he experienced little success.

At club level Moylan is a two-time Leinster medallist with St Rynagh's. He also won numerous championship medals with the club.

His retirement came following the conclusion of the 1973 championship.

== Honours ==
St Rynagh's

- Leinster Senior Club Hurling Championship (2): 1970, 1972
