= 1972–73 All-Ireland Senior Club Hurling Championship =

All-Ireland Senior Club Hurling Championship 1972–73
Championship Details
- Dates: 26 November 1972 – 9 December 1973
- Teams: 23

All Ireland Champions
- Winners: Glen Rovers (1st win)
- Captain: Denis Coughlan

All Ireland Runners-up
- Runners-up: St Rynagh's
- Captain: Frank Whelahan

Provincial Champions
- Munster: Glen Rovers
- Leinster: St. Rynagh's
- Ulster: O'Donovan Rossa
- Connacht: Castlegar

Championship Statistics
- Matches Played: 22
- Total Goals: 142 (.45 per game)
- Total Points: 345 (15.68 per game)
- Top Scorer: Barney Moylan (2–29)

The 1972–73 All-Ireland Senior Club Hurling Championship was the third staging of the All-Ireland Senior Club Hurling Championship, the Gaelic Athletic Association's premier inter-county club hurling tournament. The championship ran from 26 November 1972 to 9 December 1973.

Blackrock of Cork were the defending champions, however, they failed to qualify after being beaten by St Finbarr's in the first round of the 1972 Cork SHC.

The All-Ireland final was played at Croke Park in Dublin on 9 December 1973, between Glen Rovers of Cork and St Rynagh's of Offaly, in what was a first championship meeting between the teams. Glen Rovers won the match by 2–18 to 2–08 to claim a first title.

Barney Moylan was the championship's top scorer with 2–29.

== Connacht Senior Club Hurling Championship ==
=== Connacht first round ===
21 January 1973 Quarter-final	Tooreen	3–06 – 3–06	Tremane	Hollymount Grounds
	J Henry 1-4, A Henry 1-0, M Keane 1-0, M Henry 0-1, T Henry 0-1.		J Kilroy 1-3, R Fallon 1-2, M Keane 1-0, M Beirne 0-1.	Referee: M Burke (Sligo)

4 February 1973 Quarter-final replay	Tremane	w/o – scr.	Tooreen	Dr Hyde Park

18 February 1973 Quarter-final	Craobh Rua	5–02 – 1–03	Carrick-on-Shannon	Markievicz Park
	T Flannery 3-1, F King 1-1, L Devine 1-0.		M Poyner 1-0, K Moran 0-2, T Riordan 0-1.

=== Connacht semi-final ===
4 March 1973 Semi-final	Tremane	5–10 – 2–06	Craobh Rua	Athleague Sportsfield
	R Fallon 3-3, T Healy 2-1, J Kilroy 0-3, M Beirne 0-1, J Coyne 0-1, S Farrell 0-1.		C Lalor 1-3, T Barrett 1-2, M McTaigue 0-1.	Referee: M Flaherty (Galway)

=== Connacht final ===
18 March 1973 Final	Tremane	2–07 – 7–12	Castlegar	Athleague Sportsfield
	T Healy 1-2, M Kilroy 1-1, J Coyne 0-2, B Curley 0-1, M O'Connell 0-1.		P Egan 4-0, D Furey 2-1, P Glynn 1-3, N Commins 0-4, T Glynn 0-2, J Connolly 0-1, G Glynn 0-1.

== Leinster Senior Club Hurling Championship ==
=== Leinster first round ===
26 November 1972 First round	Arklow Rock Parnells	5–11 – 5–03	Palatine	Parnell Park
	A Byrne 1–4, J McDonald 2–0, M O'Brien 0–5, O'Reilly 1–1, K Mellon 1–1.		T Nolan 3–0, JJ Canavan 2–0, W Cullen 0–2, C Keegan 0–1.

11 March 1973 First round	Éire Óg	1–07 – 2–07	Borris-in-Ossory	St Conleth's Park
	J Winders 0–5, R Donnelly 1–0, J Murphy 0–1, J Sharpe 0–1.		P Dollard 2–1, PJ Jones 0–4, S Fahy 0–1, J Hanrahan 0–1,

=== Leinster quarter-finals ===
10 December 1972 Quarter-final	Arklow Rock Parnells	4–03 – 4–08	Rathnure	Parnell Park
	A Byrne 1–1, K Mellon 1–0, K Power 1–0, P Keogh 1–0, T Byrne 0–1, M O'Brien 0–1.		P Hendrick 2–1, M Byrne 1–1, J Quigley 1–1, J Murphy 0–2, D Quigley 0–1, S Barron 0–1, M Quigley 0–1.	Referee: D Robinson (Kildare)

10 December 1973 Quarter-final	Boardsmill	7–02 – 9–12	Faughs	St Loman's Park
	S Garrigan 4-2, S Kearney 1-0, D Fay 1-0, TJ Reilly 1-0.		T Maher 4-1, P O'Neill 2-4, M Fitzgerald 1-2, B Walsh 1-2, A Dunworth 1-1, J Lyon 0-1, S Buckley 0-1.

11 March 1973 Quarter-final	St Brigid's	1–04 – 3–11	St Rynagh's	Cusack Park
	N Maher 1–0, C Gavin 0–1, O Egan 0–1, O Gallagher 0–1, V Bradley 0–1.		G Burke 2–1, B Moylan 0–4, M Moylan 1–0, P Mulhaire 0–3, S Moylan 0–2, PJ Whelehan 0–1.

8 April 1973 Quarter-final	Borris-in-Ossory	3–07 – 4–12	The Fenians	O'Moore Park
	M Dollard 0–4, P Dollard 1–0, L Dollard 1–0, S Fahy 1–0, B Dollard 0–2, J Phelan 0–1.		P Broderick 2–5, J Moriarty 1–2, W Watson 1–1, M Garrett 0–2, P Delaney 0–1, G Murphy 0–1.

=== Leinster semi-finals ===
22 April 1973 Semi-final	Rathnure	3–13 – 2–12	Faughs	Nowlan Park
	P Hendrick 1–2, D Quigley 0–5, P Flynn 1–1, M Quigley 1–1, T O'Connor 0–2, J Mooney 0–2.		A Dunworth 1–11, J Aherne 1–0, A Devitt 0–1.

22 April 1973 Semi-final	The Fenians	3–01 – 2–13	St Rynagh's	Nowlan Park
	J Moriarty 1-0, B Watson 1-0, M Garrett 1-0, P Broderick 0-1.		B Moylan 0-10, G Burke 1-1, P Horan 1-0, P Johnson 0-1, M Moylan 0-1.	Referee: M Bowe (Wexford)

=== Leinster final ===
5 May 1973 Final	St Rynagh's	5–05 – 2–13	Rathnure	Dr Cullen Park
	B Moylan 1–4, S Moylan 1–0, G Burke 1–0, R Horan 1–0, B Lyons 1–0, P Horan 0–1.		D Quigley 2–3, P Hendrick 0–3, P Flynn 0–1.	Referee: J Rankins (Laois)

== Munster Senior Club Hurling Championship ==
=== Munster quarter-finals ===
14 January 1973 Quarter-final	South Liberties	2–07 – 3–10	Glen Rovers	Gaelic Grounds
	J McKenna 2–1, É Grimes 0–3, M Shanahan 0–3.		J Young 2–1, J O'Neill 1–1, J McCarthy 0–2, P Doherty 0–2, D Coughlan 0–2, T Buckley 0–1, P Harte 0–1.

28 January 1973 Quarter-final	Roscrea	5–11 – 1–09	Mount Sion	St Cronan's Park
	F Loughnane 1–10, J Tynan 1–1, M Minogue 1–0, P Roland 1–0, J Hannon 1–0.		S Greene 1–3, J Greene 0–2, F Walsh 0–2, M Geary 0–1, W Power 0–1.	Referee: S O'Connor (Limerick)

=== Munster semi-finals ===
10 March 1973 Semi-final	Ballyduff	0–01 – 5–06	Glen Rovers	Austin Stack Park
	P Costello 0–1.		F Cunningham 4–0, T Buckley 1–2, P Harte 0–2, G O'Sullivan 0–1, P Doherty 0–1.	Referee: J Quaid (Limerick)

11 March 1973 Semi-final	Roscrea	3–13 – 4–04	Newmarket-on-Fergus	Gaelic Grounds
	W Stapleton 2–2, J Cunningham 1–3, J Tynan 0–2, L Spooner 0–2, M Minogue 0–1, D Moloney 0–1, J Hannon 0–1, F Loughnane 0–1.		M O'Leary 2–0, M Gilmartin 1–1, G Lohan 1–0, J McNamara 0–2, P McNamara 0–1.	Referee: S O'Connor (Limerick)

=== Munster final ===
22 April 1973 Final	Glen Rovers	2–09 – 1–10	Roscrea	Gaelic Grounds, Limerick
	L McAuliffe 2–2, D Coughlan 0–2, P Harte 0–2, M Ryan 0–2, P Doherty 0–1.		F Loughnane 0–6, J Cunningham 1–1, J Tynan 0–2, J Crampton 0–1.	Referee: S O'Grady (Limerick)

== Ulster Senior Club Hurling Championship ==
=== Ulster final ===
8 April 1973 Final	O'Donovan Rossa	2–08 – 3–02	Ballycran	McAllister & McVeigh Memorial Park

== All-Ireland Senior Club Hurling Championship ==
=== All-Ireland semi-finals ===
6 May 1973 Semi-final	Glen Rovers	6–09 – 1–07	Castlegar	Cork Athletic Grounds
	T Buckley 1–4, L McAuliffe 2–0, JJ O'Neill 1–1, P Harte 1–0, M Ryan 1–0, P Doherty 0–2, J Young 0–2.		N Cummins 1–2, M Connolly 0–2, T Murphy 0–1, D Furey 0–1, G Glynn 0–1.	Referee: S O'Connor (Limerick)

20 May 1973 Semi-final	O'Donovan Rossa	2–08 – 5–09	St Rynagh's	McAllister & McVeigh Memorial Park
	S Collins 1–0, D McConnell 1–0, A Hamill 0–3, P Kane 0–2, L Hamill 0–2, S Clarke 0–1.		B Moylan 1–5, G Burke 2–0, R Horan 1–0, S Lyons 1–0, P Horan 0–3, P Mulhaire 0–1.	Referee: E Devlin (Tyrone)

=== All-Ireland final ===
9 December 1973 Final	Glen Rovers	2–18 – 2–08	St Rynagh's	Croke Park
	T Buckley 1–9, R Crowley 0–4, P Harte 1–0, M Ryan 0–3, J Young 0–1, JJ O'Neill 0–1.		B Moylan 0–6, B Johnston 1–1, P Mulhaire 1–0, P Horan 0–2.	Referee: S O'Grady (Limerick)

== Championship statistics ==
=== Top scorers ===
Rank	Player	Club	Tally	Total	Matches	Average
1	Barney Moylan	St Rynagh's	2–29	35	5	7.00
2	Tom Buckley	Glen Rovers	3–16	25	5	5.00
3	Gerry Burke	St Rynagh's	6–02	20	4	5.00
4	Francis Loughnane	Roscrea	1–17	20	3	6.66
5	Andy Dunworth	Faughs	2–12	18	2	9.00
6	Ray Fallon	Tremane	4–05	17	3	5.66
7	Pat Hendrick	Rathnure	3–06	15	3	5.00
7	Dan Quigley	Rathnure	2–09	15	3	5.00
9	Séamus Garrigan	Boardsmill	4–02	14	1	14.00
9	Liam McAuliffe	Glen Rovers	4–02	14	5	2.80
