= St Rynagh's GAA =

GAA club in County Offaly

St Rynagh's
- Naomh Raghnach
- Founded: 1961
- County: Offaly
- Colours: Blue and Gold (Hurling); Green and White (Football)
- Grounds: St Rynagh's Park, Banagher; St Rynagh's Park, Cloghan
- Coordinates: 53°11′19.34″N 7°58′23.20″W

Playing kits
Standard colours

Senior Club Championships
	All Ireland	Leinster champions	Offaly champions
Hurling:	0	4	20

St Rynagh's (Irish: Naomh Raghnach) is the name of two Gaelic Athletic Association sister clubs that encompass the towns of Cloghan and Banagher in County Offaly, in Ireland. The St Rynagh's Football Club is based in Cloghan and wears green and white hooped jerseys; the St Rynagh's Hurling Club is based in Banagher and wears blue and gold jerseys.

== History ==
Formed in 1961, to represent the parish of Cloghan and Banagher, the club gained almost immediate success - winning the senior hurling championship in 1965. The St Rynagh's Hurling Club went on to appear in three All-Ireland club hurling finals during the next 30 years.

St Rynagh's has also supplied three of Offaly's four All-Ireland Hurling Championship winning captains, namely Padraig Horan, Martin Hanamy and Hubert Rigney. Other noted players in the club's history include RTÉ pundit Michael Duignan, Pad Joe Whelahan, Aidan Fogarty and Declan Fogarty, David Hughes, Tom and Mícheál Conneely, and first ever all-star goalkeeper Damien Martin. In 2017, Padraig Horan was inducted into the GAA Hall of Fame.

In football, Greg Hughes and Dinny Wynne won the All-Ireland Senior Football Championship with Offaly in 1971 and 1982, respectively.

The club enters teams for all major codes, and continues to have players which represent Offaly on both the hurling and football county teams.

St Rynagh's have won the Minor, Under 16, and Under 14 Offaly championships in 2007, while also reaching the Semi-Final at the 2007 Féile na nGael in Kilkenny. The Under 14 football squad captured the Division 3 title at Feile Peil na nÓg also.

== Honours ==
=== Hurling ===
- Leinster Senior Club Hurling Championships (4): 1970, 1972, 1982, 1993
- Offaly Senior Hurling Championships (20): 1965, 1966, 1968, 1969, 1970, 1972, 1973, 1974, 1975, 1976, 1981, 1982, 1987, 1990, 1992, 1993, 2016, 2019, 2020, 2021
- Offaly Senior B Hurling Championship (1): 1989
- Offaly Intermediate Hurling Championship (4): 1978, 1987, 1992, 1993
- Offaly Junior A Hurling Championship (7): 1934 (Banagher), 1940 (Banagher), 1942 (Cloghan), 1963, 1975, 2004, 2011
- Offaly Minor Hurling Championship (20): 1942 (Banagher), 1946 (Banagher), 1947 (Banagher), 1948 (Banagher), 1961, 1962, 1963, 1965, 1972, 1973, 1974, 1975, 1976, 1977, 1982, 1986, 2005, 2007, 2009, 2010

=== Football ===
- Offaly Senior Football Championships (3): 1903 (Cloghan), 1910 (Banagher), 1945 (Cloghan)
- Offaly Senior B Football Championship (1): 1988
- Offaly Intermediate Football Championship (11): 1910 (Banagher), 1913 (Banagher), 1915 (Cloghan), 1929 (Cloghan), 1934 (Cloghan), 1939 (Cloghan), 1980, 1986, 2005, 2010, 2020
- Offaly Junior Football Championship (2): 1974, 1975
- Offaly Minor Football Championship (6): 1931 (Cloghan), 1940 (Cloghan), 1941 (Cloghan), 1961, 1968, 2023 (Cloghan)

=== Camogie ===
- All-Ireland Intermediate Club Camogie Championship (2): 2020, 2021
- Offaly Senior Camogie Championships (5): 2017, 2018, 2019, 2020, 2021
- Offaly Junior A Camogie Championship (1): 1997
- Offaly Junior B Camogie Championships (3): 2010, 2019, 2020
- Offaly Minor A Camogie Championships (2): 2012, 2013
- Offaly Minor B Camogie Championship (1): 2008
- Offaly Minor C Camogie Championship (1): 2019

=== Ladies Football ===
- Offaly Senior Ladies Football Championship (1): 2012
- Offaly Minor Ladies Football Championship (1): 2010

== Notable players ==
- Tom Conneely
- Michael Duignan
- Aidan Fogarty
- Declan Fogarty
- Martin Hanamy
- Padraig Horan
- David Hughes
- Damien Martin
- Shane McGuckin
- Barney Moylan
- Pat Moylan
- Sean Moylan
