= 2000 All-Ireland Senior Hurling Championship final =

2000 All-Ireland Hurling Final
- Event: 2000 All-Ireland Senior Hurling Championship
Kilkenny	Offaly
5-15	1-14
- Date: 10 September 2000
- Venue: Croke Park, Dublin
- Man of the Match: D. J. Carey
- Referee: Willie Barrett (Tipperary)
- Attendance: 61,493

The 2000 All-Ireland Senior Hurling Championship Final was the culmination of the 2000 All-Ireland Senior Hurling Championship. It was played on 10 September 2000 between Kilkenny and Offaly. Kilkenny was appearing in their third consecutive All-Ireland final after losing to Offaly in 1998 and to Cork in 1999. They aimed to win their first championship since 1993. In their first championship game since winning the championship in 1998, Offaly lined up. The team's most recent championship encounter had taken place in the Leinster final earlier that year, where Kilkenny defeated Offaly.

== Match report ==
At 3:30 PM, match referee Willie Barrett threw in the sliotar and the 112th Millennium All-Ireland final got underway. After six minutes, Kilkenny's D.J. Carey "pounced" on a mistake from Offaly corner-back Niall Claffey to score Kilkenny's opening goal. Carey's sixth-minute goal was followed three minutes later by a Henry Shefflin goal. Shefflin's effort was helped home by Carey but the umpire ruled that the ball had already crossed the line. After ten minutes, the score was 2-3 to 0-1 in Kilkenny's favour. The last twenty-five minutes of the opening half saw Offaly score seven more points, five of which came from Johnny Dooley frees. Offaly's only real goal chance, a ground stroke from Michael Duignan, went narrowly wide in the eighteenth minute. Kilkenny, however, created several opportunities to add to their two early goals and soon after Charlie Carter bagged a third goal for Kilkenny four minutes before half-time. At the interval, despite Offaly's eighteen scoring chances to Kilkenny's fifteen, the latter had a ten-point lead of 3-10 to 0-9.

At the beginning of the second half, the Offaly selectors made some tactical changes. Wing-back Brian Whelahan and corner-forward Michael Duignan swapped positions while John Troy was brought from the substitutes' bench. For the second time Shefflin was the man on hand to hit the fourth goal after latching onto a long clearance from substitute Canice Brennan and kicking the sliothar past Stephen Byrne from close range. In the fifty-ninth minute,Johnny Pilkington clawed one back for Offaly when his shot went past James McGarry. An injury-time goal by substitute Eddie Brennan was the final decider as Kilkenny defeated their Leinster rivals by 5-15 to 1-14.

This game marked the end of the road for the "great" Offaly team of the 1990s while it was the beginning of a decade of success for Kilkenny.

== Match details ==
2000-09-10
15:30 BST

Kilkenny	5-15 – 1-14	Offaly
H. Shefflin (2-2); D. J. Carey (1-4); C. Carter (1-3); D. Byrne (0-4); E. Brennan (1-0); J. Hoyne (0-1); A. Comerford (0-1)	(Report)	Johnny Dooley (0-8); J. Pilkington (1-1); G. Hanniffy (0-1); B. Murphy (0-1); P. Mulhaire (0-1); Joe Dooley (0-1); B. Whelahan (0-1)

Croke Park, Dublin
Attendance: 61,493
Referee: Willie Barrett (Tipperary)

KILKENNY:
GK	1	James McGarry
RCB	2	Michael Kavanagh
FB	3	Noel Hickey
LCB	4	Willie O'Connor (c)
RWB	5	Phil Larkin
CB	6	Eamonn Kennedy
LWB	7	Peter Barry
MD	8	Andy Comerford
MD	9	Brian McEvoy
RWF	10	Denis Byrne
CF	11	John Power
LWF	12	John Hoyne
RCF	13	Charlie Carter
FF	14	D. J. Carey
LCF	15	Henry Shefflin
Substitutes:
	16	Canice Brennan
	17	Eddie Brennan

OFFALY:
GK	1	Stephen Byrne
RCB	2	Simon Whelahan
FB	3	Kevin Kinahan
LCB	4	Niall Claffey
RWB	5	Brian Whelahan
CB	6	Joe Errity
LWB	7	Kevin Martin
MD	8	Johnny Dooley
MD	9	Ger Oakley
RWF	10	Johnny Pilkington
CF	11	Gary Hanniffy
LWF	12	Brian Murphy
RCF	13	Michael Duignan
FF	14	John Ryan
LCF	15	Joe Dooley
Substitutes:
	16	David Franks
	17	John Troy
	18	Paudie Mulhaire

MATCH RULES

- 70 minutes.
- Replay if scores level.
- Five named substitutes
