= 1989 Offaly Senior Hurling Championship =

Annual hurling competition season

- Champions: Lusmagh (1st title); Jim Troy (captain); Joachim Kelly (manager)
- Runners-up: Seir Kieran; Pa Mulrooney (captain); Joe Dooley (manager); Eugene Coughlan (manager)

The 1989 Offaly Senior Hurling Championship was the 92nd staging of the Offaly Senior Hurling Championship since its establishment by the Offaly County Board in 1896.

Seir Kieran entered the championship as the defending champions.

The final was played on 22 October 1989 at St Brendan's Park in Birr, between Lusmagh and Seir Kieran, in what was their first ever meeting in the final. Lusmagh won the match by 1–11 to 1–10 to claim their first ever championship title.

== Results ==
=== Semi-finals ===
| 1 October 1989 Semi-final | Lusmagh | 0-13 - 1-09 | St Rynagh's | St Brendan's Park |

| 1 October 1989 Semi-final | Seir Kieran | 3-10 - 1-09 | Birr | St Brendan's Park |

=== Final ===
| 22 October 1989 Final | Lusmagh | 1-11 - 1-10 | Seir Kieran | St Brendan's Park |
