= Eugene Coughlan =

Irish hurler

Personal information
- Native name: Eoghan Ó Cochláin (Irish)
- Born: 18 November 1956 (age 69) Clareen, County Offaly, Ireland
- Occupation: Telecom employee
- Height: 6 ft 2 in (188 cm)

Sport
- Sport: Hurling
- Position: Full-back
Club
- Years: Club
- 1975-2002: Seir Kieran
Club titles
- Offaly titles: 4
Inter-county
Years	County	Apps (scores)
1975-1990	Offaly	39 (1-00)
Inter-county titles
- Leinster titles: 7
- All-Irelands: 2
- NHL: 0
- All Stars: 2

Eugene Coughlan (born 18 November 1956) is an Irish retired hurler. At club level, he played for Seir Kieran and at inter-county level with the Offaly senior hurling team.

== Career ==
Coughlan first played hurling at juvenile and underage levels with the Seir Kieran club in Clareen. He eventually progressed to adult level and captained the club to their inaugural Offaly SHC title in 1988. Coughlan won further Offaly SHC titles in 1995, 1996 and 1998.

At inter-county level, Coughlan first appeared for Offaly during a two-year tenure with the under-21 team. He made his senior team debut in a National Hurling League game against Waterford in November 1975. Coughlan was part of the Offaly team that beat Kilkenny to win their inaugural Leinster SHC title in 1980. He claimed a second consecutive Leinster SHC title the following year, before lining out at full-back in Offaly's 2–12 to 0–15 win over Galway in the 1981 All-Ireland SHC final.

Coughlan won another consective set of Leinster SHC medals in 1984 and 1985. He won a second All-Ireland SHC medal in 1985, the same year he claimed a second consecutive All-Star and was named Texaco Hurler of the Year. Coughlan won a further three consecutive Leinster SHC medals between 1988 and 1990. He played his 120th and final game for Offaly in November 1990.

== Honours ==
Seir Kieran

- Offaly Senior Hurling Championship (4): 1988 (c), 1995, 1996, 1998

Offaly

- All-Ireland Senior Hurling Championship (2): 1981, 1985
- Leinster Senior Hurling Championship (7): 1980, 1981, 1984, 1985, 1988, 1989, 1990

Awards

- Texaco Hurler of the Year (1): 1985
- All-Stars (2): 1984, 1985

Awards
Preceded by John Fenton	Texaco Hurler of the Year; 1985	Succeeded by Ger Cunningham
