= Shane Dooley =

Irish hurler and Gaelic footballer

Personal information
- Native name: Seán Ó Dulaoích (Irish)
- Born: 26 September 1986 (age 40) Tullamore, County Offaly, Ireland
- Occupation: Secondary school teacher
- Height: 6 ft 1 in (185 cm)

Sport
- Sport: Hurling
- Position: Right corner-forward
Club
- Years: Club
- 2003–: Tullamore
Club titles
	Football	Hurling
Offaly titles	3	1
College
- Years: College
- University of Limerick
College titles
- Fitzgibbon titles: 1
Inter-county*
Years	County	Apps (scores)
2007–2023	Offaly	41 (22–237)
Inter-county titles
- Leinster titles: 0
- All-Irelands: 0
- NHL: 0
- All Stars: 0
- *Inter County team apps and scores correct as of 17:33, 3 June 2018.

Shane Dooley (born 26 September 1986) is an Irish hurler who previously played as a right corner-forward for the Offaly senior team.

Born in Tullamore, County Offaly, Dooley came from a strong hurling family. His paternal and maternal granduncles as well as his grandfather experienced All-Ireland JHC success with the Offaly junior team in 1923 and 1929. His father, Joe Dooley, and his uncles, Johnny and Billy Dooley, won seven All-Ireland SHC medals between them between 1985 and 1998.

Dooley first played competitive inter-county hurling and Gaelic football with Tullamore College. Here he won a Leinster Vocational Schools Junior B Championship medal and an All-Ireland Vocational Schools Championship medal. Dooley simultaneously came to prominence at juvenile and underage levels with the Tullamore club. As a dual player at senior level he won a county hurling championship medal and three senior football championship medals. While studying at the University of Limerick, Dooley won a Fitzgibbon Cup medal in 2011.

Dooley made his debut on the inter-county scene as a dual player when he was selected for the Offaly minor teams. He later lined out for the Offaly under-21 teams in both codes before concentrating on hurling after making his senior debut during the 2007 league. After that, Dooley became a regular member of the starting fifteen, as well as Offaly's all-time championship top scorer.

A member of the Leinster inter-provincial team on a number of occasions, Dooley won a Railway Cup medal in 2012.

In December 2023, Dooley announced his retirement from inter-county hurling after 17 years of play.

== Career statistics ==
As of match played 13 June 2021.

Team	Year	National League			Ring Cup		McDonagh Cup		Leinster		All-Ireland		Total	
Team	Year	Division	Apps	Score	Apps	Score	Apps	Score	Apps	Score	Apps	Score	Apps	Score
Offaly	2007	Division 1A	2	0–3	—		—		2	0–0	2	0–0	6	0–3
Offaly	2008	Division 1B	5	0–6	—		—		2	0–2	2	0–7	9	0–15
Offaly	2009	Division 2	8	8–46	—		—		1	0–4	2	1–3	11	9–53
Offaly	2010	Division 1	7	6–59	—		—		3	2–27	2	1–12	12	9–98
Offaly	2011	Division 1	8	3–42	—		—		1	1–13	1	1–9	10	5–64
Offaly	2012	Division 1B	5	3–43	—		—		2	3–15	1	1–6	8	7–64
Offaly	2013	Division 1B	5	4–37	—		—		1	0–5	1	1–4	7	5–46
Offaly	2014	Division 1B	5	0–12	—		—		1	0–1	2	0–4	8	0–17
Offaly	2015	Division 1B	6	4–55	—		—		1	0–10	1	0–6	8	4–71
Offaly	2016	Division 1B	6	0–62	—		—		5	4–39	1	0–7	12	4–108
Offaly	2017	Division 1B	6	4–53	—		—		2	3–17	1	0–5	9	7–75
Offaly	2018	Division 1B	5	2–23	—		—		4	2–21	—		9	4–44
Offaly	2019	Division 1B	4	2–6	—		4	1–7	—		—		8	3–13
Offaly	2020	Division 2A	—		—		—		—		—		—	
Offaly	2021	Division 2A	5	0–19	0	0–0	—		—		—		5	0–19
Total			77	36–466	0	0–0	4	1–7	25	15–154	16	5–63	122	57–690

Sporting positions
Preceded by Brian Carroll	Offaly Senior Hurling Captain; 2011	Succeeded by David Kenny
