= 1998 Offaly Senior Hurling Championship =

Annual hurling competition season

- Dates: 25 April – 22 November 1998
- Teams: 11
- Champions: Seir Kieran (4th title); Kevin Kinahan (captain)
- Runners-up: St Rynagh's; Hubert Rigney (captain)

The 1998 Offaly Senior Hurling Championship was the 99th staging of the Offaly Senior Hurling Championship since its establishment by the Offaly County Board in 1896. The draw for the group stage pairings took place in February 1998. The championship ran from 25 April to 22 November 1998.

Birr entered the championship as the defending champions, however, they were beaten by St Rynagh's in the semi-finals.

The final, a replay, was played on 22 November 1998 at St Brendan's Park in Birr, between Seir Kieran and St Rynagh's, in what was their third meeting in the final in four years. Seir Kieran won the match by 1–11 to 0–08 to claim their fourth championship title overall and a first championship title in two years.

== Team changes ==
=== From Championship ===
Moved to the Offaly Intermediate Hurling Championship

- Belmont (regraded)
- Carrig & Riverstown (relegated)

== Knockout stage ==
=== Quarter-finals ===
17 October 1998 Quarter-final	St Rynagh's	1-13 - 0-13	Drumcullen	Lusmagh Grounds
	F Dolan 0-10, E Martin 1-0, K Flannery 0-2, R Devery 0-1.		T Ryan 0-9, C Gath 0-3, B Gath 0-1.

18 October 1998 Quarter-final	Seir Kieran	3-16 - 1-10	Kilcormac–Killoughey	St Rynagh's Park
	Johnny Dooley 0-8, Joe Dooley 1-2, TJ Dooley 1-0, M Coughlan 0-3, B Dooley 0-2, J Coakley 0-1.		C Cassidy 1-6, J Wynne 0-2, M Murray 0-1, S Spain 0-1, N Hand 0-1.

=== Semi-finals ===
25 October 1998 Semi-final	Seir Kieran	3-10 - 1-10	Coolderry	St Brendan's Park
	Johnny Dooley 1-5, M Mulrooney 1-2, M Coughlan 1-0, B Dooley 0-2, Joe Dooley 0-1.		M O'Rourke 1-3, V Teehan 0-4, R Dooley 0-1, M Moloney 0-1, J Kirwan 0-1.

25 October 1998 Semi-final	St Rynagh's	4-03 - 0-10	Birr	St Brendan's Park
	K Flannery 1-0, F Dolan 1-0, M Conneely 1-0, M Duignan 1-0, E Martin 0-2, P Mulhare 0-1.		O O'Neill 0-4, Brian Whelehan 0-2, G Hanniffy 0-1, D Pilkington 0-1, D Hanniffy 0-1, Barry Whelehan 0-1.

=== Final ===
8 November 1998 Final	Seir Kieran	0-13 - 1-10	St Rynagh's	St Brendan's Park
	Johnny Dooley 0-10, Joe Dooley 0-2, B Dooley 0-1.		E Martin 0-5, M Duignan 1-1, M Rigney 0-2, F Dolan 0-1, P Mulhare 0-1.

=== Final replay ===
21 November 1998 Final replay	Seir Kieran	1-11 - 0-08	St Rynagh's	St Brendan's Park
	Johnny Dooley 1-6, M Coughlan 0-2, Joe Dooley 0-1, K Kealey 0-1, K Dooley 0-1.		E Martin 0-2, M Rigney 0-2, D Kelly 0-2, M Conneely 0-1, P Mulhare 0-1.
