= James Mulrooney =

Irish hurler

Personal information
- Native name: Séamus Ó Maolruanaidh (Irish)
- Born: 1989 (age 36–37) Clareen, County Offaly, Ireland

Sport
- Sport: Hurling
- Position: Left wing-forward
Club
- Years: Club
- 2007-present: Seir Kieran
Club titles
- Offaly titles: 0
Inter-county*
Years	County	Apps (scores)
2010-	Offaly	2 (0-00)
Inter-county titles
- Leinster titles: 0
- All-Irelands: 0
- NHL: 0
- All Stars: 0
- *Inter County team apps and scores correct as of 18:15, 26 June 2011.

James Mulrooney (born 1989 in Clareen, County Offaly, Ireland) is an Irish sportsperson. He plays hurling with his local club Seir Kieran and has been a member of the Offaly senior inter-county team since 2010.

== Playing career ==
=== Club ===
Mulrooney plays his club hurling with Seir Kieran.

=== Inter-county ===
Mulrooney has lined out in all grades for Offaly. He started in 2007 as a member of the county's minor hurling team before subsequently joining the Offaly under-21 team. He enjoyed little success in either grade.

Mulrooney was in his final year in the under-21 grade when he joined the Offaly senior hurling team in 2010. He made his debut as a substitute in a National Hurling League game against Galway. Mulrooney made his championship debut against Dublin in 2011. He started against Cork in the championship qualifiers the same year.
