= Thomas Carroll (hurler) =

Irish sportsperson

Personal information
- Native name: Tomás Ó Cearúil (Irish)
- Born: 1992 (age 33–34) Clareen, County Offaly, Ireland

Sport
- Sport: Hurling
- Position: Full-forward
Club
- Years: Club
- 2010-present: Seir Kieran
Club titles
- Offaly titles: 0
Inter-county*
Years	County	Apps (scores)
2011-	Offaly	1 (0-00)
Inter-county titles
- Leinster titles: 0
- All-Irelands: 0
- NHL: 0
- All Stars: 0
- *Inter County team apps and scores correct as of 20:35, 30 June 2011.

Thomas Carroll (born 1992 in Clareen, County Offaly, Ireland) is an Irish sportsperson. He plays hurling with his local club Seir Kieran and has been a member of the Offaly senior inter-county team since 2011.

== Playing career ==
=== Club ===
Carroll plays his club hurling with the Seir Kieran club and has enjoyed some success. He first came to prominence at juvenile and underage levels, winning a county under-16 'B' title in 2007.

Carroll later played for the club's minor team but enjoyed little success in this grade. He is currently a member of the Seir Kieran under-21 and senior teams. He played on the losing side when Seir Kieran were defeated by Coolderry in the 2010 county under-21 final.

=== Inter-county ===
Carroll first played for Offaly as a member of the county's minor hurling team in 2008. He enjoyed three years with Offaly in that grade but enjoyed little success. He is currently a member of the Offaly under-21 team.

In 2011 Carroll made his senior debut for Offaly in a pre-season Walsh Shield game against UCD. Offaly later went on to win the final of that competition, with Carroll scoring a goal against Carlow in the final.

Carroll made his senior championship debut when he came on as a substitute against Cork in a 2–17 to 2–16 defeat in the 2011 All-Ireland qualifiers.
