= Mick Coughlan =

Irish hurler

Personal information
- Native name: Mícheál Ó Cochlainn (Irish)
- Born: Clareen, County Offaly, Ireland

Sport
- Sport: Hurling
- Position: Centre-back/ Centre-forward
Club
- Years: Club
- 1977-2005: Seir Kieran
Club titles
- Offaly titles: 4
Inter-county*
Years	County	Apps (scores)
1982-1988	Offaly	3 (0-00)
Inter-county titles
- Leinster titles: 3
- All-Irelands: 1
- NHL: 0
- All Stars: 0
- *Inter County team apps and scores correct as of 15:51, 29 June 2014.

Mick Coughlan is an Irish retired hurler who played as a centre-back for the Offaly senior team.

Born in Clareen, County Offaly, Coughlan first played competitive hurling in his youth. He made his senior debut with Offaly during the 1982-83 National League and immediately became a regular member of the team. During his career Coughlan won one All-Ireland medal and three Leinster medals. Mick played centre back when Offaly beat Wexford in the 1988 Leinster Hurling Championship Final.

His retirement came during the 1988-89 National League.

== Honours ==
=== Team ===
Seir Kieran

- Offaly Senior Hurling Championship (4): 1988, 1995, 1996, 1998.

Offaly

- All-Ireland Senior Hurling Championship (1): 1985 (sub)
- Leinster Senior Hurling Championship (3): 1984, 1985, 1988
