= Noel Bergin =

Irish hurler

Personal information
- Native name: Nollaig Ó Beirgin (Irish)
- Born: Clareen, County Offaly, Ireland

Sport
- Sport: Hurling
- Position: Goalkeeper
Club
- Years: Club
- Seir Kieran
Club titles
- Offaly titles: 4
Inter-county*
Years	County	Apps (scores)
1980-1984	Offaly	1 (0-00)
Inter-county titles
- Leinster titles: 0
- All-Irelands: 0
- NHL: 0
- All Stars: 0
- *Inter County team apps and scores correct as of 16:05, 29 June 2014.

Noel Bergin is an Irish retired hurler who played as a goalkeeper for the Offaly senior team.

Born in Clareen, County Offaly, Bergin first played competitive hurling in his youth.He was on the 1978 Offaly U21 team that won the counties first Leinster title at that grade scoring 2 points in the final. He made his senior debut with Offaly during the 1980 championship and was sub goalkeeper for much of his career. During that time he won two Leinster medals as a non-playing substitute.

At club level Bergin is a four-time championship with Seir Kieran.

His retirement came during the 1984 All-Ireland Senior Hurling Championship.

== Honours ==
=== Team ===
Seir Kieran

- Offaly Senior Hurling Championship (1): 1988

Offaly

- Leinster Senior Hurling Championship (2): 1980 (sub), 1984 (sub)
