= 1995 Offaly Senior Hurling Championship =

Annual hurling competition season

- Champions: Seir Kieran (2nd title); Joe Dooley (captain)
- Runners-up: St Rynagh's; Kieran Flannery (captain)

The 1995 Offaly Senior Hurling Championship was the 98th staging of the Offaly Senior Hurling Championship since its establishment by the Offaly County Board in 1896.

Birr entered the championship as the defending champions.

The final, a replay, was played on 28 October 1995 at St Brendan's Park in Birr, between Seir Kieran and St Rynagh's, in what was their second meeting in the final overall. Seir Kieran won the match by 0–10 to 0–09 to claim their second championship title overall and a first championship title in seven years.

== Results ==
=== Semi-finals ===
15 October 1995 Semi-final	St Rynagh's	0-12 - 0-11	Coolderry	St Brendan's Park
	M Conneely 0-5, D Coleman 0-4, M Duignan 0-1, P Mulhare 0-1, A Fogarty 0-1.		D O'Meara 0-4, R Deegan 0-2, P O'Connor 0-1, D Teehan 0-1, V Teehan 0-1, D Dooley 0-1, D Miller 0-1.

15 October 1995 Semi-final	Seir Kieran	3-08 - 1-13	Birr	St Brendan's Park
	Johnny Dooley 0-7, M Mulrooney 2-0, E Coughlan 1-1.		R Landy 0-5, Brian Whelehan 1-1, O O'Neill 0-2, P Murphy 0-2, S Whelehan 0-1, D Pilkington 0-1, C McGlone 0-1.

=== Final ===
22 October 1995 Final	Seir Kieran	1-13 - 1-13	St Rynagh's	St Brendan's Park
	Johnny Dooley 0-9, B Dooley 1-1, Joe Dooley 0-1, J Coakley 0-1, M Mulrooney 0-1.		M Conneely 0-8, D Coleman 1-1, R Mannion 0-1, P Mulhare 0-1, L Egan 0-1, K Flannery 0-1.

=== Final replay ===
28 October 1995 Final replay	Seir Kieran	0-10 - 0-09	St Rynagh's	St Brendan's Park
	Johnny Dooley 0-8, Joe Dooley 0-1, E Coughlan 0-1.		R Mannion 0-3, M Conneely 0-3, K Flannery 0-2, B Broderick 0-1.
