= Kevin Kinahan =

Irish hurler

Personal information
- Native name: Caoimhín Ó Coinneacháin (Irish)
- Born: 7 October 1971 (age 55) Clareen, County Offaly, Ireland
- Occupation: Butcher
- Height: 6 ft 2 in (188 cm)

Sport
- Sport: Hurling
- Position: Full-back
Club
- Years: Club
- Seir Kieran
Club titles
- Offaly titles: 3
Inter-county
Years	County	Apps (scores)
1992-2002	Offaly	29 (0-00)
Inter-county titles
- Leinster titles: 2
- All-Irelands: 2
- NHL: 0
- All Stars: 3

Kevin Kinahan (born 7 October 1971) is an Irish retired hurler who played for club side Seir Kieran and at inter-county level with the Offaly senior hurling team.

== Career ==
Born in Clareen, County Offaly, Kinahan first came to prominence with the Seir Kieran club. He won the first of four County Championship medals in 1988, with the other victories coming in 1995, 1996 and 1998. Kinahan never played minor hurling for Offaly but was full-back on the under-21 team that won back-to-back Leinster Under-21 Championships in 1990 and 1991. He made his senior debut during the 1991-92 National League, however, it would take another few years before he made his first championship start.

Kinahan collected his first silverware with the team in 1994 when Offaly won the Leinster Championship before ending the season as an All-Ireland Championship-winner after a defeat of Limerick in the final. He won a second successive provincial title the following year before claiming a second All-Ireland winners' medal in 1998. After a defeat to Kilkenny in the 2000 All-Ireland final, Kinahan lined out for one further season before announcing his retirement in January 2002.

== Honours ==
Seir Kieran

- Offaly Senior Club Hurling Championship: 1995, 1996, 1998

Offaly

- All-Ireland Senior Hurling Championship: 1994, 1998
- Leinster Senior Hurling Championship: 1994, 1995
- Leinster Under-21 Hurling Championship: 1991, 1992

Awards

- All-Stars: 1994, 1995, 1998
