= 1996 Offaly Senior Hurling Championship =

Annual hurling competition season

- Champions: Seir Kieran (3rd title); Liam Coughlan (captain)
- Runners-up: St Rynagh's; Roy Mannion (captain)

The 1996 Offaly Senior Hurling Championship was the 99th staging of the Offaly Senior Hurling Championship since its establishment by the Offaly County Board in 1896.

Seir Kieran entered the championship as the defending champions.

The final was played on 13 October 1996 at St Brendan's Park in Birr, between Seir Kieran and St Rynagh's, in what was their second consecutive meeting in the final overall. Seir Kieran won the match by 0–13 to 1–08 to claim their third championship title overall and a second championship title in succession.

== Results ==
=== Semi-finals ===
22 September 1996 Semi-final	St Rynagh's	1-12 - 0-10	Birr	St Brendan's Park
	M Conneely 0-7, E Mulhare 1-1, E Martin 0-2, M Duignan 0-1, L Egan 0-1.		A Cahill 0-3, G Hanniffy 0-3, O O'Neill 0-2, D Pilkington 0-1, Brian Whelehan 0-1.

22 September 1996 Semi-final	Seir Kieran	3-12 - 3-12	Kilcormac–Killoughey	St Brendan's Park
	Joe Dooley 0-9, B Dooley 0-3, M Coughlan 2-0, E Coughlan 1-0..		D Gleeson 1-3, D Barron 0-4, K Lambe 1-0, N Hand 0-2, J Rigney 0-1, S Hand 0-1, T Spain 0-1.

28 September 1996 Semi-final replay	Seir Kieran	0-14 - 0-07	Kilcormac–Killoughey	St Brendan's Park
	Johnny Dooley 0-10, B Dooley 0-1, Joe Dooley 0-1, S Dooley 0-1, K Kealey 0-1.		D Gleeson 0-2, J Rigney 0-2, D Barron 0-1, S Hand 0-1, D Owens 0-1.

=== Final ===
13 October 1996 Final	Seir Kieran	0-13 - 1-08	St Rynagh's	St Brendan's Park
	Johnny Dooley 0-4, B Dooley 0-3, M Mulrooney 0-3, Joe Dooley 0-1, P Scully 0-1, M Coughlan 0-1.		M Conneely 0-4, H Rigney 1-0, M Duignan 0-2, D Kelly 0-1, R Mannion 0-1.
