= Niall Claffey =

Irish sportsperson

Personal information
- Born: Birr, County Offaly

Sport
- Sport: Hurling
- Position: Corner-back
Club
- Years: Club
- Birr
Inter-county
Years	County	Apps (scores)
1999-2006	Offaly	18
Inter-county titles
- Leinster titles: 0
- All-Irelands: 0

Niall Claffey (born 1978 in Birr, County Offaly) is an Irish sportsperson. He plays hurling with his local club Birr and was a member of the Offaly senior inter-county team between 1999 and 2006.
