= Eamon Kennedy =

Irish hurler

Personal information
- Native name: Éamonn Ó Cinnéide (Irish)
- Born: 1972 (age 53–54) Dunnamaggin, County Kilkenny, Ireland
- Height: 6 ft 3 in (191 cm)

Sport
- Sport: Hurling
- Position: Centre-back
Clubs
- Years: Club
- Dunnamaggin; Kilmoganny
Club titles
	Football	Hurling
Kilkenny titles	1	1
Inter-county*
Years	County	Apps (scores)
1999-2001	Kilkenny	9 (0-00)
Inter-county titles
- Leinster titles: 3
- All-Irelands: 1
- NHL: 0
- All Stars: 1
- *Inter County team apps and scores correct as of 12:32, 25 January 2015.

Eamon Kennedy (born 1972) is an Irish hurler who played as a centre-back for the Kilkenny senior team.

Born in Dunnamaggin, County Kilkenny, Kennedy first arrived on the inter-county scene when he first linked up with the Kilkenny under-21 team, before later joining the junior side. He made his senior debut during the 1999 championship. Kennedy went on to play a key role in defence, and won one All-Ireland medal and three Leinster medals.

Kennedy was a member of the Leinster inter-provincial team on a number of occasions, however, he never won a Railway Cup medal. At club level he has won a full set of senior, intermediate and junior championship medals with Dunnamaggin, while he has also won a championship medal as a Gaelic footballer with Kilmoganny.

Throughout his career Kennedy made 9 championship appearances for Kilkenny. Injury hampered his final season and he retired from inter-county hurling following the conclusion of the 2001 championship.

== Playing career ==
=== Club ===
Kennedy first tasted success with Dunnamaggin in 1994. That year the club faced Blacks and Whites in the final of the junior championship. A 2-9 to 1-10 victory gave Kennedy a Kilkenny Junior Hurling Championship medal.

Dunnamaggin's first year in the intermediate grade saw the club reach the final. A 2-21 to 1-9 trouncing of Bennettsbridge gave Kennedy a championship medal and secured promotion to the top grade for the club.

After just two years at senior level Dunnamaggin qualified for the final of the championship. Young Irelands were the opponents on that occasion, however, a 2-10 to 2-7 victory gave Kennedy a championship medal in the top grade.

Dunnamaggin were relegated from the senior championship shortly after this victory, however, the club qualified for the final of the intermediate championship again in 2000. A 5-9 to 1-6 trouncing of St. Martin's gave Kennedy a second championship medal in that grade. That same year he won a senior football championship medal with Kilmoganny following a 2-11 to 1-9 defeat of Dicksboro in a replay.

=== Inter-county ===
Kennedy made his senior championship debut on 20 June 1999 in a 6-21 to 1-14 Leinster semi-final defeat of Laois. He later collected his first Leinster medal following a 5-14 to 1-16 defeat of Offaly. Kennedy was dropped from the starting fifteen for the subsequent All-Ireland decider, which Kilkenny narrowly lost to Cork by 0-13 to 0-12.

In 2000 Kennedy won a second Leinster medal following another comfortable 2–21 to 1–13 victory over Offaly. As a result of the so-called "back-door" system both sides later faced off against each other again in the All-Ireland final on 10 September 2000. D.J. Carey capitalised on an Offaly mistake after just six minutes to start a goal-fest for 'the Cats'. Carey scored 2–4 in all, sharing his second goal with Henry Shefflin who also scored a goal in the second-half. At the full-time whistle Kilkenny were the champions by 5–15 to 1–14 and Kennedy collected an All-Ireland medal. He was later presented with an All-Star award.

Delaney won a third successive Leinster medal in 2001 following a 2-19 to 0-12 trouncing of Wexford.

== Honours ==
=== Player ===
Dunnamaggin

- Kilkenny Senior Hurling Championship (1): 1997
- Kilkenny Intermediate Hurling Championship (2): 1995, 2001
- Kilkenny Junior Hurling Championship (1): 1994

Kilkenny

- All-Ireland Senior Hurling Championship (1): 2000
- Leinster Senior Hurling Championship (3): 1999, 2000, 2001
- Leinster Under-21 Hurling Championship (1): 1993
- All-Ireland Junior Hurling Championship (1): 1995
- Leinster Junior Hurling Championship (1): 1995

=== Individual ===
Awards

- All-Star (1): 2000
