= Paudie Mulhare =

Irish sportsperson

Personal information
- Born: 12 May 1976 (age 50) Banagher, County Offaly
- Height: 5 ft 10 in (178 cm)

Sport
- Sport: Hurling
- Position: Half-back
Club
- Years: Club
- St Rynagh's
Inter-county
Years	County	Apps (scores)
1996-2004	Offaly	34
Inter-county titles
- Leinster titles: 1
- All-Irelands: 1

Paudie Mulhare (born 12 May 1976 in Banagher, County Offaly) is an Irish sportsperson. He plays hurling with his local club St Rynagh's and was a member of the Offaly senior inter-county team between 1996 and 2004.
