= 1988 Offaly Senior Hurling Championship =

Annual hurling competition season

- Champions: Seir Kieran (1st title); Eugene Coughlan (captain)
- Runners-up: St Rynagh's

The 1988 Offaly Senior Hurling Championship was the 91st staging of the Offaly Senior Hurling Championship since its establishment by the Offaly County Board in 1896.

St Rynagh's entered the championship as the defending champions.

The final was played on 23 October 1988 at St Brendan's Park in Birr, between Seir Kieran and St Rynagh's, in what was their second consecutive meeting in the final. Seir Kieran won the match by 3–13 to 4–06 to claim their first ever championship title.

== Results ==
=== Final ===
23 October 1988 Final	Seir Kieran	3-13 - 4-06	St Rynagh's	St Brendan's Park
