= Billy Dooley =

Offaly hurler

Personal information
- Native name: Liam Ó Dulaoích (Irish)
- Born: 26 March 1969 (age 57) Tullamore, County Offaly, Ireland
- Occupation: Builder
- Height: 5 ft 10 in (178 cm)

Sport
- Sport: Hurling
- Position: Right corner-forward
Club
- Years: Club
- Seir Kieran
Club titles
- Offaly titles: 4
Inter-county
Years	County	Apps (scores)
1988–1999	Offaly	27 (9-39)
Inter-county titles
- Leinster titles: 2
- All-Irelands: 2
- NHL: 1
- All Stars: 2

William Dooley (born 26 March 1969) is an Irish former hurler who played for Offaly Senior Championship club Seir Kieran. He played for the Offaly senior hurling team for 11 seasons, during which time he usually lined out as a right corner-forward. Dooley, together with his brothers Joe and Johnny, formed the backbone of the Offaly attack for over a decade.

Dooley began his hurling career at club level with Seir Kieran. He broke onto the club's top adult team as an 18-year-old when he lined out as a goalkeeper in the 1987 Offaly Championship. Having earlier won under-16 and minor championship titles, Dooley won Offaly Senior Championship titles in 1988, 1995, 1996 and 1998.

At the inter-county level, Dooley was part of the Offaly minor team that won back-to-back All-Ireland Championships in 1986 and 1987, before later ending up as an All-Ireland Championship runner-up with the Offaly under-21 team in 1989. He joined the Offaly senior team in 1988. After a slow start to his senior career, Dooley eventually became an ever-present figure at corner-forward and made a combined total of 66 National League and Championship appearances in a career that ended with his last game in 1999. During that time he was part of two All-Ireland Championship-winning teams – in 1994 and 1998. Dooley also secured two Leinster Championship medals and a National Hurling League medal.

Dooley won his first All-Star in 1994, before claiming a second successive award in 1995.

== Honours ==
=== Team ===
St Brendan's Community School

- Dr Croke Cup (1): 1986
- Leinster Colleges Senior Hurling Championship (2): 1985, 1986

Seir Kieran

- Offaly Senior Hurling Championship (4): 1988, 1995, 1996, 1998

Offaly

- All-Ireland Senior Hurling Championship (2): 1994, 1998
- Leinster Senior Hurling Championship (2): 1994, 1995
- National Hurling League (1): 1990-91
- Leinster Under-21 Hurling Championship (1): 1989
- All-Ireland Minor Hurling Championship (2): 1986, 1987
- Leinster Minor Hurling Championship (2): 1986, 1987

=== Individual ===
Awards

- All-Star (2): 1994, 1995
