= Johnny Dooley (hurler) =

Irish former hurling manager and player

Personal information
- Native name: Seán Ó Dulaoích (Irish)
- Born: 7 October 1971 (age 55) Tullamore, County Offaly, Ireland
- Occupation: HSE clerk of works
- Height: 5 ft 11 in (180 cm)

Sport
- Sport: Hurling
- Position: Right wing-forward
Club
- Years: Club
- 1988–2003: Seir Kieran
Club titles
- Offaly titles: 4
Inter-county
Years	County	Apps (scores)
1991–2003	Offaly	35 (4-190)
Inter-county titles
- Leinster titles: 2
- All-Irelands: 2
- NHL: 1
- All Stars: 3

Johnny Dooley (born 7 October 1971 in Clareen, County Offaly) is an Irish former hurling manager and player. He played hurling with his local club Clareen GAA and was a member of the Offaly senior inter-county team from 1991 until 2002. Dooley served as manager of the Westmeath senior inter-county team from 2007 until 2008.

== Early life ==
Johnny Dooley was born just outside Clareen, County Offaly in 1971. He was born into a family that was steeped in hurling history. His father's uncle, Tom Dooley, as well as his mother's father and uncle had all played with Offaly in the junior All-Ireland finals in 1929 and 1923 respectively. Similarly, for almost two decades Johnny and his brothers Billy and Joe formed the backbone of the Offaly senior hurling team.

On 10 January 2007 Dooley, along with his two brothers Billy and Joe, was profiled on the TG4 television programme Laochra Gael.

== Playing career ==
=== Club ===
Dooley, along with his four brothers, played club hurling with his local Seir Kieran club. He enjoyed some success at underage levels before winning four senior county championship titles in 1988, 1995, 1996 and 1998.

=== Minor and under-21 ===
By the late 1980s Dooley had earned a call-up to the Offaly minor hurling team. In 1987 he captured a Leinster title in that grade following a victory over Kilkenny. Offaly later played Tipperary in the All-Ireland final. After an exciting hour of hurling Offaly emerged victorious by 2–8 to 0–12, giving Dooley a minor All-Ireland winners' medal. It was Offaly's first-ever minor title.

Offaly lost their provincial crown in 1988, however, the following year Dooley captured a second Leinster title following a trouncing of Kilkenny in a provincial final replay. Offaly later lined out against Clare in the All-Ireland final. After an exciting game Offaly were the winners by 2–16 to 1–12, giving Dooley a second All-Ireland medal in the minor grade.

That same year Dooley was also a key member of the Offaly under-21 team. He won a Leinster title in that grade following a 3–16 to 3–9 win over Kilkenny. The subsequent All-Ireland final saw Offaly take on Tipperary. A high-scoring game saw Dooley's side being defeated by 4–10 to 3–11.

Two years later Dooley added a second Leinster winners' medal to his collection that year before later playing in a second All-Ireland under-21 final. Galway provided the opposition on that occasion, however, Dooley's side were completely outclassed again as the men from the West won by 2–17 to 1–9.

The following year Dooley added a third Leinster under-21 winners' medal to his collection that year before later lining out in the All-Ireland final. Waterford provided the opposition on that occasion, however, both sides finished level. The replay saw Waterford win the game by 0–12 to 2–3, leaving Dooley with a third All-Ireland under-21 runners-up medal.

=== Senior ===
By this stage Dooley was also a member of the Offaly senior hurling team. He made his senior debut in the 1990–1991 National Hurling League, with Offaly reaching the final of that competition. Wexford were the opponents on that occasion, however, after a tense game Offaly took the victory and Dooley captured a National League winners' medal. He made his championship debut against Dublin later that summer, however, provincial success was slow in coming.

After a few years out of the limelight Offaly bounced back in 1994. That year Dooley added a Leinster senior winners' medal to his collection following a 1–18 to 0–14 victory over Wexford. After defeating Galway in the All-Ireland semi-final, Dooley later lined out against Limerick in the All-Ireland final. With five minutes left in the game Limerick were five points ahead and were coasting to victory. It was then that one of the most explosive All-Ireland final finishes of all-time took place. Offaly were awarded a close-in free which Johnny Dooley stepped up to take. Dooley was told by the management team to take a point; however, he lashed the ball into the Limerick net to reduce the deficit. Following the puck-out Offaly worked the ball upfield and Pat O'Connor struck for a second goal. The Offaly forwards scored another five unanswered points in the time remaining to secure a 3–16 to 2–13 victory. This victory gave Dooley an All-Ireland winner's medal. He was later presented with his first All-Star award.

In 1995 Offaly retained the Leinster title following a 2–16 to 2–5 trouncing of Kilkenny. It was Dooley's second provincial winners' medal. Down fell to Offaly in the subsequent All-Ireland semi-final, allowing Offaly to advance to the championship decider and attempt to defend their title against the Munster champions, Clare. It was the first ever meeting of these two sides in the history of the championship. The game developed into a close affair with Offaly taking a half-time lead. Four minutes from the end substitute Éamonn Taaffe first timed a long range free straight into the net to give Clare a one-point lead. After a quick equaliser Anthony Daly sent over a 65-metre free to give his team the lead again. Jamesie O'Connor pointed soon afterwards and at the full-time whistle Clare were the 1–13 to 2–8 winners. In spite of this loss Dooley was still presented with a second All-Star award.

Offaly surrendered their provincial crown for the next few years and failed to regain it. In 1998 Offaly had another controversial year. Dooley's side reached the Leinster final but lost to Kilkenny. This defeat prompted their manager, Babs Keating, to describe the Offaly hurlers as "sheep in a heap", and he promptly resigned. It looked as if Offaly's championship hopes were in disarray, however, they overcame Antrim in the All-Ireland quarter-final and qualified to meet Clare in the semi-final. The first game against Clare ended in a draw and had to be replayed, however, the replay was ended early because of a time-keeping error by the referee. Following a protest on the pitch of Croke Park by the Offaly supporters it was decided that Clare and Offaly would meet for a third time. Dooley's side won the third game and qualified to play Kilkenny in the final. Offaly reversed the Leinster final defeat by winning the All-Ireland final by 6 points. Dooley had captured his second All-Ireland medal.

Whelahan and Offaly reached the All-Ireland final again in 2000 but were defeated by Kilkenny by 5–15 to 1–14. It was the most one-sided All-Ireland final in decades and it marked the end of the great Offaly team of the 1990s. In spite of that disappointment Dooley finished off the year by winning a third All-Star award. He was forced into premature retirement in 2002 following a serious knee injury.

== Managerial career ==
Johnny Dooley
Sport
Inter-county management
- Years: Team
- 2007–2008: Westmeath

In retirement from playing Dooley maintained a keen interest in the game. In 2004 he served in a coaching capacity with the Kildare senior hurling team and in 2005 he took charge of the Offaly minor hurling team. Following unsuccessful stints in both Kildare and Offaly Dooley was invited to Westmeath where he took charge of coaching the county's senior hurling team. During his year as coach Dooley saw Westmeath capture the Christy Ring Cup. Following the resignation of manager Séamus Qualter following this victory Dooley took over as manager.

=== Westmeath ===
Dooley's first season in charge has seen some early success. His team only lost to Mayo in the group stages of Division 2A of the National Hurling League. Four victories out of five allowed the team advance to the semi-final stage of the competition where they trounced Down. The final saw Dooley's side defeat Carlow on a score line of 2–12 to 0–12. In spite of not being eligible to play in the Liam MacCarthy Cup series of games, Westmeath were invited to participate in the Leinster Championship. The team's first outing was against Dublin, however, Dooley's side were defeated by 3–21 to 0–11. Westmeath's real hope of success was to retain the Christy Ring Cup which they won in 2007. Their campaign in that competition got off to a good start with a 3–23 to 0–13 trouncing of Roscommon. Dooley's side narrowly lost their next game against Wicklow, however, in spite of this his side still qualified for the quarter-finals of the Christy Ring Cup. Kildare, the side that Westmeath defeated in the final of the competition in 2007, proved admirable opponents, however, Dooley's side still captured a 2–22 to 3–13 win. After easily defeating Derry in the semi-final Westmeath qualified for their third final in four years. Carlow were admirable opponents on that occasion and went on to win the game by 3–22 to 4–16. Shortly after this defeat Dooley decided to step down as Westmeath manager.

== Honours ==
=== Player ===
Seir Kieran

- Offaly Senior Hurling Championship: 1988, 1995, 1996, 1998

Offaly

- All-Ireland Senior Hurling Championship: 1994, 1998
- Leinster Senior Hurling Championship: 1994, 1995
- National Hurling League: 1990–91
- Leinster Under-21 Hurling Championship: 1989, 1991, 1992
- All-Ireland Minor Hurling Championship: 1987, 1989
- Leinster Minor Hurling Championship: 1987, 1989

=== Management ===
Westmeath

- Christy Ring Cup: 2007

Sporting positions
Preceded by Danny Owens	Offaly minor hurling team manager 2005–2006	Succeeded by Ger Coughlan
Preceded by Séamus Qualter	Westmeath senior hurling team manager 2007–2008	Succeeded by Éamonn Gallagher
