= Joe Dooley (Seir Kieran hurler) =

Irish former hurler and manager

Personal information
- Native name: Seosamh Ó Dulaoích (Irish)
- Born: 12 November 1963 (age 62) Clareen, County Offaly, Ireland
- Occupation: ESB Employee
- Height: 6 ft 1 in (185 cm)

Sport
- Sport: Hurling
- Position: Left corner forward
Club
- Years: Club
- 1980–2006: Seir Kieran
Club titles
- Offaly titles: 4
Inter-county
Years	County	Apps (scores)
1982–2000	Offaly	51 (14–72)
Inter-county titles
- Leinster titles: 6
- All-Irelands: 3
- NHL: 1
- All Stars: 1

Joe Dooley (born 13 November 1963) is an Irish former hurler and manager.

Dooley enjoyed a successful playing career at club level with Seir Kieran and is the only Offaly player ever to have won three All-Ireland titles. After a spell as player-manager with Seir Kieran, Dooley worked as manager with Tullamore, Toomevara and Offaly. He managed the Irish Senior International Shinty team for three years against Scotland and has managed the Linster Senior Hurling team for the period 2012 to 2014.

Born in Clareen, County Offaly, Dooley was the eldest of a family of five boys and four girl and was born into a family that was steeped in hurling history. His paternal and maternal granduncles and his grandfather played for Offaly in the junior All-Ireland finals of 1915, 1923 and 1929. Other members of the famous Dooley family include brothers Billy and Johnny, as well as his son Shane. He married wife Marie in 1985 and as well as eldest son Shane, they have two daughters, Aideen, and Niamh.

Joe Dooley has been immortalised in the song "That’s Joe Dooley"

== Playing career ==
=== Club ===
Dooley played his club hurling with the Seir Kieran club and enjoyed much success in a career that last for a quarter of a century.

In 1985 Seir Kieran qualified for their first county championship decider in over thirty years and Dooley was one of the key forwards. He bagged a grand total of 1–4 in the game, however, Kinnitty routed their opponents by 3–18 to 2–8.

Two years later Seir Kieran were back in the county final again. Club kingpins St. Rynagh's provided the opposition and a close game developed. Dooley was Seir Kieran's top scorer again with five points, however, the Banagher-based club recorded an 0–11 to 0–9 victory.

In 1988 Dooley took over as player-manager of the club. Seir Kieran won the senior club league for the first time and also qualified for a second successive county final beating Kimmitty in the semi-final. St. Rynagh's provided the opposition for the second year in-a-row, however, on this occasion Seir Kieran were the winners and Dooley collected his first county senior championship winners' medal scoring 0–4. Joe, Billy and Johnny scored 2–11 in the final, while his other brother Kieran got man of the match.

Seir Kieran went through a drought of success for the majority of the next eight years. After failing to make it two county titles in-a-row in 1989, Dooley's club lost championship deciders to Birr in 1991 and again in 1994.

In 1995 Seir Kieran qualified for the club championship decider again after defeating reigning county, provincial and All-Ireland club champions Birr in the semi-final. St Rynagh's provided stiff opposition in the county final, however, Seir Kieran looked to be heading towards their second championship ever. An equalising goal by St. Rynagh's in the second minute of injury time secured a draw and a replay. Seir Kieran won the replay a week later and Dooley secured his second county championship title and was captain of the side.

Both Seir Kieran and St. Rynagh's met again in the championship decider of 1996 and, once again, the game was a close affair. Dooley's side were two points in arrears with two minutes to go, however, Seir Kieran battled back to win by 0–13 to 1–8. It was a third county title for Dooley.

In 1997 Seir Kieran had the chance to make it three title in-a-row. All was going to plan as Dooley's side qualified for the championship decider with Birr. The game developed into a tight affair, however, Birr pulled away in the last ten minutes to secure a 0–14 to 2–4 victory.

A fourth championship decider in succession beckoned for Dooley's side in 1998 with old rivals St. Rynagh's providing the opposition. This game ended in a draw, and the replay saw Dooley pick up a fourth county championship winners' medal following a 1–11 to 0–8 victory.

After failing to retain the title in 1999, Seir Kieran were back in the millennium championship decider. Birr easily won the game by 3–21 to 1–9.

By 2006 Dooley had retired from the Seir Kieran senior hurling team, however, he lined out for club's junior team in the championship decider that year. St. Rynagh's provided the opposition, however, Seir Kieran claimed the title.

=== Inter-county ===
Dooley enjoyed a successful colleges career, winning five Leinster colleges medals, and played in two all-Ireland senior colleges finals with Presentation Brothers College Birr. He joined the Offaly senior hurling panel in April 1982. He quickly became a regular player in the National Hurling League campaigns. Two years later in 1984 Dooley made his senior championship debut, playing against Wexford in the provincial decider. A close game developed, however, the full-time whistle Offaly were the winners by 1–15 to 2–11. A single-point victory gave Dooley his first Leinster winners' medal. A subsequent 4–15 to 1–10 defeat of Galway in the All-Ireland semi-final with Dooley scoring 2–3 allowed Offaly to advance to the centenary-year All-Ireland final at Semple Stadium in Thurles. It was the first ever meeting of Offaly and Cork in championship history. The game failed to live up to expectations and Cork recorded a relatively easy 3–16 to 1–12 victory.

In 1985 Dooley lined out in a second consecutive provincial decider. Laois provided the opposition on that occasion. Offaly won easily by 5–15 to 0–17. The ability to get goals at crucial times gave Dooley a second Leinster medal. A fourteen-point trouncing of Antrim in the All-Ireland semi-final allowed Offaly to advance to the All-Ireland final. Galway were the opponents on that occasion and a tense game ensued. Again it was Offaly's goal-scoring ability that proved crucial. Pat Cleary scored the first of the day after twenty-five minutes of play and got his second less than half a minute after the restart. Dooley had a goal disallowed halfway through the second-half while a long Joe Cooney effort, which seemed to cross the goal line, was not given for Galway. P.J. Molloy was Galway's goal scorer, however, the day belonged to Offaly. A 2–11 to 1–12 victory gave Dooley his first All-Ireland medal.

After losing back-to-back Leinster finals to Kilkenny for the next two years, Offaly won again 1988. A 3–12 to 1–14 defeat of Wexford gave Dooley a third winners' medal in the provincial championship. Offaly's championship campaign was ended in the All-Ireland semi-final when Galway won by seven points.

In 1989 Offaly were still the masters of the Leinster championship. Dooley came on as a substitute to collect his fourth provincial winners' medal as his team defeated Kilkenny by 3–15 to 4–9. Offaly's next game was an All-Ireland semi-final meeting with Antrim and, while the Leinster champions were the red-hot favourites, victory went to the Ulster champions on a score line of 4–15 to 1–15. The significance of this victory was not lost on Offaly as the entire team gave the Antrim players a guard of honour and a standing ovation as they left the field. It was the first time that the team had qualified for an All-Ireland final since 1943.

Dooley missed the 1990 championship campaign, however, in 1991 he added a National Hurling League medal to his collection. The following years saw Offaly face defeat in the early rounds of the provincial championship. By that stage all three Dooley brothers were playing together on the Offaly senior team.

After a few years out of the limelight Offaly bounced back in 1994. That year Dooley added a fifth Leinster winners' medal to his collection following a 1–18 to 0–14 victory over Wexford. After defeating Galway in the All-Ireland semi-final, Dooley later lined out against Limerick in the All-Ireland final. With five minutes left in the game Limerick were five points ahead and were coasting to victory. It was then that one of the most explosive All-Ireland final finishes of all-time took place. Offaly were awarded a close-in free which Johnny Dooley stepped up to take. Dooley was told by the management team to take a point; however, he lashed the ball into the Limerick net to reduce the deficit. Following the puck-out, Offaly worked the ball upfield and Pat O'Connor struck for a second goal. The Offaly forwards scored another five unanswered points in the time remaining to secure a 3–16 to 2–13 victory. This sensational victory gave Dooley a second All-Ireland winner's medal.

In 1995 Offaly retained the Leinster title following a 2–16 to 2–5 trouncing of Kilkenny. It was Dooley's sixth and final provincial winners' medal. Down fell to Offaly in the subsequent All-Ireland semi-final, allowing Offaly to advance to the championship decider and attempt to put back-to-back All-Ireland titles together for the first time ever. It was the first-ever meeting of Offaly and Clare in the history of the championship. The game developed into a close affair with Offaly taking a half-time lead. Four minutes from the end, substitute Éamonn Taaffe first timed a long range free straight into the net to give Clare a one-point lead. After a quick equaliser, Anthony Daly sent over a 65-metre free to give his team the lead again. Jamesie O'Connor pointed soon afterwards and at the full-time whistle Clare were the 1–13 to 2–8 winners.

After a couple of seasons in the doldrums, Offaly emerged again in 1998, however, the year was not without controversy. That year Dooley's side reached the Leinster final but lost by five points to Kilkenny. This defeat prompted their manager, Babs Keating, to describe the Offaly hurlers as "sheep in a heap", and he promptly resigned. It looked as if Offaly's championship hopes were in disarray, however, they overcame Antrim in the All-Ireland quarter-final and qualified to meet Clare in the semi-final. That game ended in a draw 1–13 apiece draw and had to be replayed. The replay, however, was ended early because of a time-keeping error by the referee Jimmy Cooney. Following a protest on the pitch of Croke Park by the Offaly supporters it was decided that Clare and Offaly would meet for a third time. Dooley's side won the third game and qualified to play Kilkenny in the final in a repeat of the provincial decider. On that day Brian Whelahan, despite suffering from flu, started in defence and was later moved to full-forward where he scored 1–6. Offaly reversed the Leinster final defeat by winning the All-Ireland final by six points. Dooley set a record by becoming the first Offaly player to capture a third All-Ireland winners' medal. He was later presented with his sole All-Star award.

Two years later in 2000 Dooley's side suffered a heavy defeat to Kilkenny in the Leinster final. As a result of the 'back-door' system in the championship both sides later faced off against each other again in the All-Ireland final. D. J. Carey capitalised on an Offaly mistake after just six minutes to start a goal-fest for 'the Cats'. Carey scored 2–4 in all, sharing his second goal with Henry Shefflin who also scored a goal in the second-half. At the full-time whistle Kilkenny were the champions by 5–15 to 1–14. It was one of the most one-sided finals in decades and marked the end of the great Offaly team of the nineties.

In 2001 there was speculation that Dooley would soldier on for another season of inter-county activity. In spite of this he announced his inter-county retirement in March of that year.

== Management career ==
=== Early experience ===
Even at the height of his playing career Dooley became involved in team management. In 1988 he was only twenty-four years-old when he took over as player-manager at Seir Kieran. It was a successful move as Dooley proved instrumental both on and off the field in helping the club to take their first ever senior county championship title. He steered Seir Kieran to two league titles and a first senior championship win

Just two years after his inter-county career drew to a close, Dooley took charge of the famous Toomevara club in Tipperary. It was a reasonably successful tenure, however, it was a turbulent one nonetheless. In spite of guiding 'Toome' to win the Tipperary Senior League and the semi-finals of the north Tipperary championship, Dooley departed his position as manager just a week before that game as speculation grew that the players were not happy with his training methods.

Two years later Dooley was back in club management, this time with his adopted home of Tullamore. He enjoyed success winning the division two league and setting the foundations for their senior championship success in 2009.

=== Offaly ===
In October 2007 Dooley was appointed manager of the Offaly senior hurling team. Shortly before taking up this post, Dooley's brother, Johnny, was appointed manager of the Westmeath senior hurling team.

Dooley's first championship campaign in 2008 was a tough one. After trouncing Laois by 4–22 to 2–12 in the provincial quarter-final, Offaly qualified to play reigning All-Ireland champions Kilkenny. A 2–24 to 0–12 defeat was Offaly's lot on that occasion, as Dooley's side were banished to the All-Ireland qualifiers and a tough assignment against Limerick. That game defined both teams' seasons as Dooley's underdogs triumphed by 3–19 to 0–18. Offaly's reward for winning that game was another All-Ireland qualifier against Waterford in Semple Stadium. In spite of giving a good account of themselves, Dooley's side were beaten by a very experienced Waterford outfit; however, there was cause for optimism due to some very good championship performances.

In 2009 Dooley's side built on their progress by reaching the division 2 final of the National Hurling League. Fellow Leinstermen Wexford provided the opposition, however, Offaly triumphed by 1–13 to 0–13 and claimed promotion to division 1. The subsequent championship campaign was not a successful one as Wexford exacted their revenge by dumping Offaly out of the provincial championship. The All-Ireland qualifiers route beckoned again, however, Cork trounced Dooley's side and brought their championship campaign to an end.

2010 saw Offaly open their championship campaign with a narrow extra-time defeat of Antrim. Offaly's side were regarded as underdogs for their next game against Galway, however, the men from the 'faithful county' nearly pulled off the shock of the championship. A draw was the result, however, the replay was just as exciting with victory going narrowly to Galway. After defeating Limerick Offaly's interest in the championship was ended by eventual champions Tipperary.

Dooley stepped down from his post as Offaly senior hurling manager on 28 June 2011, following Offaly's championship exit to Cork by a narrow margin.

Dooley managed the Irish International Hurling/Shinty team to success over Scotland in 2009, 2010 and 2011. He also managed Leinster in the interprovincial hurling competition in 2012, 2013 and 2014, winning the competition in 2012 and 2014. He won an All star award in 1998 and was selected at left corner forward on the Leinster hurling team of the last 25 Year (1984–2009).

== Playing honours ==
=== Seir Kieran ===
- Offaly Senior Hurling Championship:
  - Winner (4): 1988, 1995, 1996, 1998
  - Runner-up (7): 1985, 1987, 1989, 1991, 1994, 1997, 2000

=== Offaly ===
- All-Ireland Senior Hurling Championship:
  - Winner (3): 1985, 1994, 1998
  - Runner-up (3): 1984, 1995, 2000
- Leinster Senior Hurling Championship:
  - Winner (6): 1984, 1985, 1988, 1989, 1994, 1995
  - Runner-up (8): 1982, 1983, 1986, 1987, 1996, 1998, 1999, 2000
- National Hurling League:
  - Winner (1): 1990–1991
- Leinster Under-21 Hurling Championship:
  - Winner (0):
  - Runner-up (1): 1982

Sporting positions
Preceded by John McIntyre	Offaly Senior Hurling Manager; 2007–2011	Succeeded by Ollie Baker
