= Seir Kieran GAA =

GAA club in County Offaly

Seir Kieran
- Ciarán Saighir
- Founded: 1887
- County: Offaly
- Nickname: Clareen
- Colours: Black and amber
- Grounds: Clareen
- Coordinates: 53°04′27″N 7°47′58″W

Playing kits
Standard colours

Senior Club Championships
	All Ireland	Leinster champions	Offaly champions
Hurling:	0	0	4

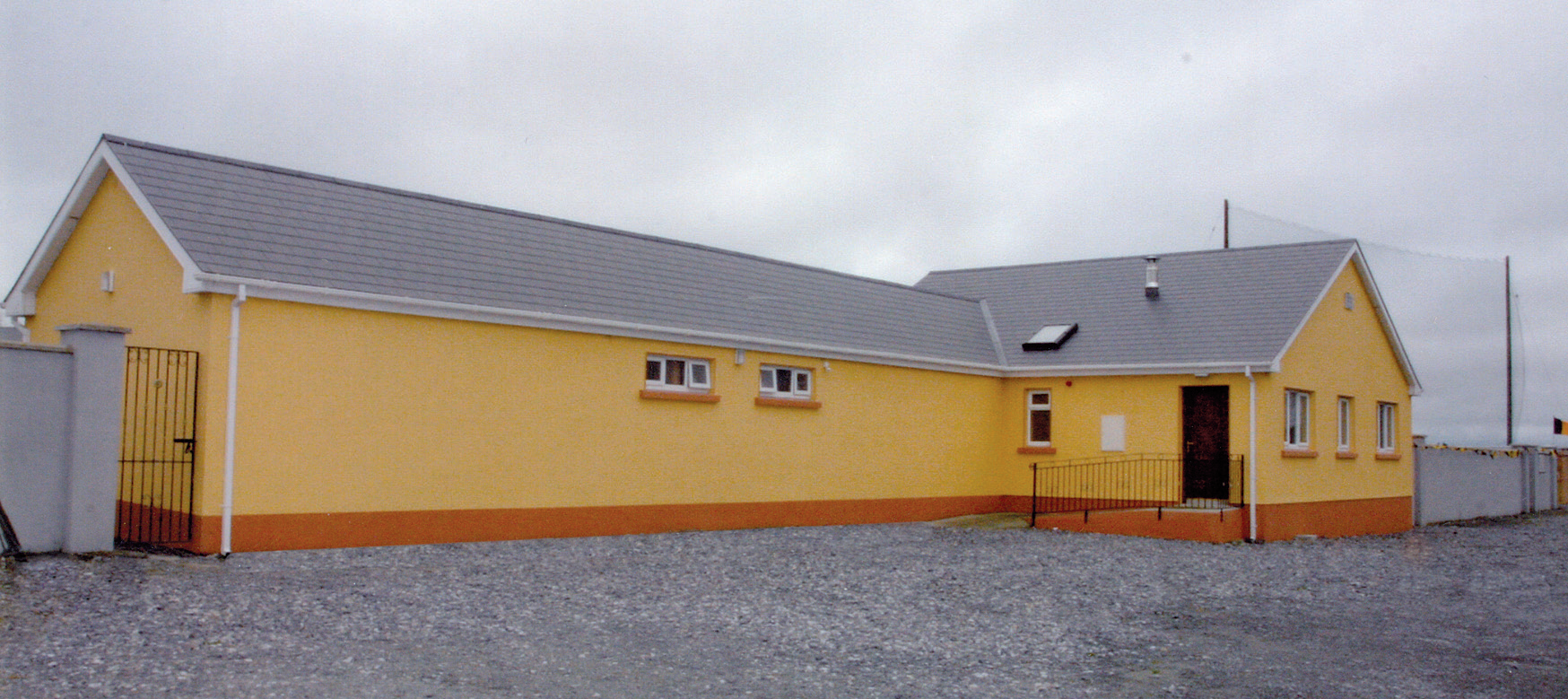
The club rooms of Seir Kieran GAA Club in 2005

Seir Kieran is a Gaelic Athletic Association club located in a parish and electoral division (ED) of the same name in County Offaly in Ireland. The population of Seirkieran is approximately 460. Seir Kieran takes its name from Saint Ciarán of Saighir, who founded the parish as a civitas (a monastic city) in the 5th century. The club's playing facilities are situated in the village of Clareen in County Offaly.

Seir Kieran caters mainly to players of the games of hurling and camogie. However, the club has also competed in the Offaly football competitions and reached the Offaly Senior Football Championship semi-final in 1927. Founded in 1887, for 67 of its 128 years, and continuously since 1970, the club has competed in the Offaly Senior Hurling Championship, winning the Sean Robbins Cup on four occasions. Seir Kieran has also had success at junior, intermediate, and under-age levels, for example, winning the Offaly Junior 'A' Hurling Championship for the seventh time in 2014.

Players from Seir Kieran were on each of the four Offaly teams that have won the Liam MacCarthy Cup, and eleven hurling All Star Awards have been won by five players from Seir Kieran: Eugene Coughlan (1984, 1985); Johnny Dooley (1994, 1995, 2000); Kevin Kinahan (1994, 1995, 1998); Billy Dooley (1994, 1995); and Joe Dooley (1998). Three players from the club have captained the Offaly Senior hurling team: Joe Dooley (1997), Johnny Dooley (2000), and Joe Bergin (2014).

== History ==
=== Foundation and early years (1887 to 1912) ===
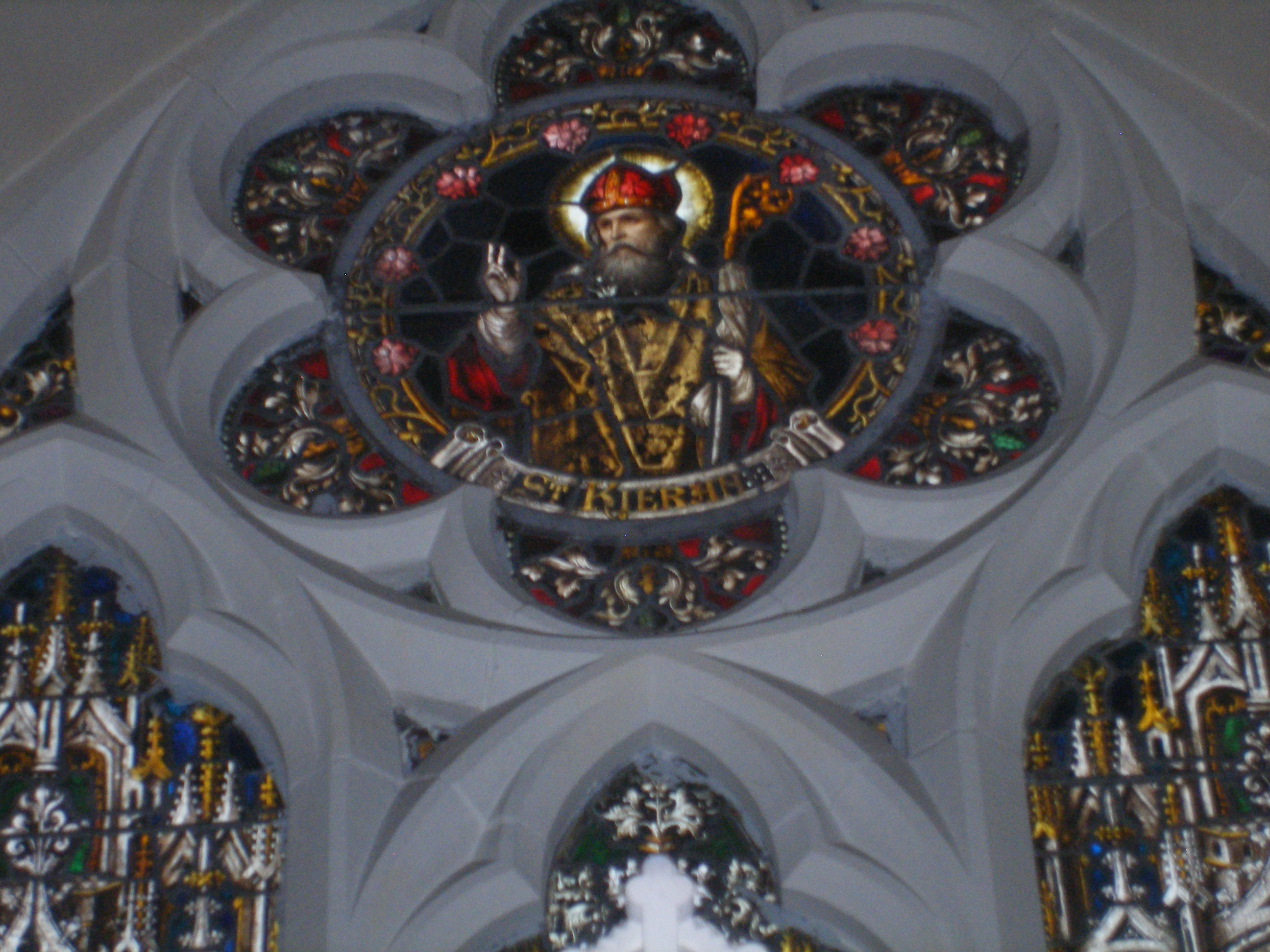
Window depicting St. Kieran, Seir Kieran Church, Bell Hill

The advent of the GAA club at Clareen in 1887 coincided with the drive to build a new parish church, as the old one (erected in 1795 in the townland of Breaghmore) had become structurally unsound. The first secretary of the club, from 1887 until he emigrated in 1895, was Frank Pilkington of Bell Hill. Pilkington went on to become secretary to the Offaly GAA Club in New York.

In 1907, the Offaly hurling championship was divided into Senior and Junior grades and, in 1912, Seir Kieran beat Roscore (3-0 to 1-1) to win the Offaly Junior final.

During this period, Seir Kieran adopted their black and amber colours (similar to the Kilkenny county colours). In November 1911, John Drennan of Conway Hall, Kells, County Kilkenny donated a set of black and amber jerseys to the Kilkenny County Board, GAA. It is reported that prior to this gesture, he had won a large amount of money on a horse whose jockey wore those colours. John Drennan was a brother of Fr. Jeremiah Drennan, parish priest of Seir Kieran from 1904 to 1921. It is possible that Fr. Drennan emulated his brother's gesture by presenting the club with a set of jerseys identical to the Kilkenny ones.

=== 1910s to 1930s ===
From 1915 to 1918, Jimmy Corrigan of Clareen served as secretary to the GAA's Offaly County Board. Corrigan, who played much of his club hurling with Birr GAA club, was also secretary to the Birr Sinn Féin Club, and (clandestinely) a lieutenant in the Irish Volunteers. He died aged 27 in October 1918, and Celtic cross-shaped commemorative headstone was erected over his grave in the Seir Kieran New Cemetery.

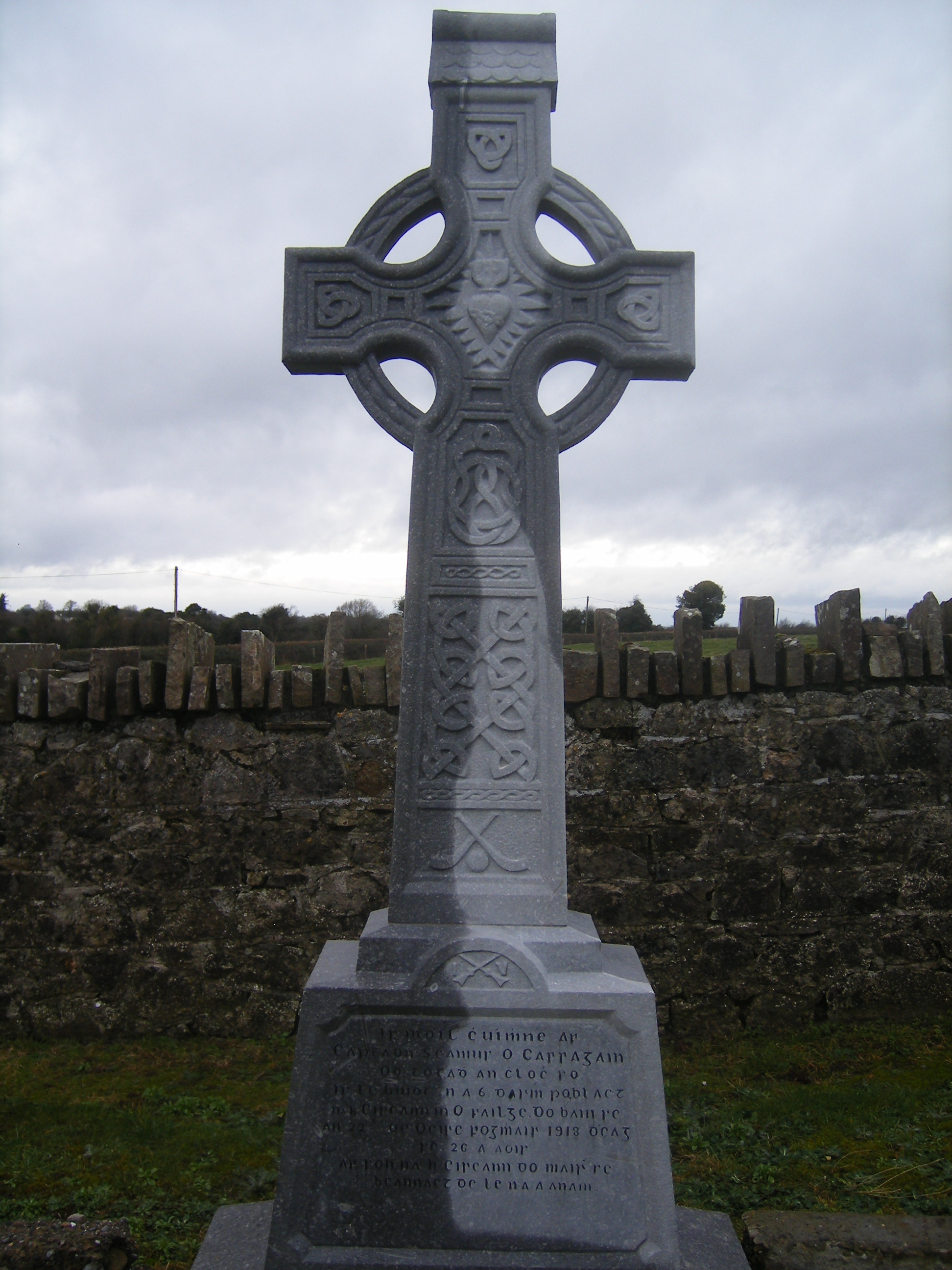
Headstone of James Corrigan (1891–1918) – teacher; Offaly GAA secretary; captain of Offaly Junior hurlers in 1915 All Ireland Final; Lieutenant of Volunteers, Irish Republican Army

Seir Kieran reached the 1920 Junior Hurling final. Due to the War of Independence and the Civil War (when the Clareen Company, 4th Battalion, IRA comprised several Seir Kieran hurlers), this final could not be played off until 13 May 1923, when Clara defeated them (Clara 5-2, Seir Kieran 2-1). In the Junior final for 1923 proper, played at Kilcormac on 18 November, Seir Kieran won their second title with a 4-0 to 1-0 victory over Tullamore.

In 1929, PJ Grogan of Clareen captained Offaly to what was their second Junior All Ireland hurling title. On the club scene, Seir Kieran lost the 1927 Offaly Senior Hurling (South County) final, going down to Drumcullen by 3-3 to 2-4. In the Junior Championship of 1929 Seir Kieran overcame Birr and Coolderry before losing to Shannonharbour (5-3 to 2-2) in the semi-final, on 8 September 1929. In May 1931, John Coughlan of Seir Kieran played in goal for the Offaly Minors (against Westmeath at Clara).

=== Intermediate success ===
The first Intermediate title came in Ballyduff, Tullamore on 20 September 1931, when Seir Kieran beat Clara by 5-7 to 2-5. The club played at Senior grade for the following two seasons. The 1932 panel was augmented by Dick and Willie Conway from Roscomroe, a district of Kinnitty Parish with historic ties to Seir Kieran. Other players included Mick Leahy, Kieran Grogan, Dan Murphy and Jim Killeen. Originally from Lusmagh, Jim Killeen and his brother Mick had come to Clareen as young boys.

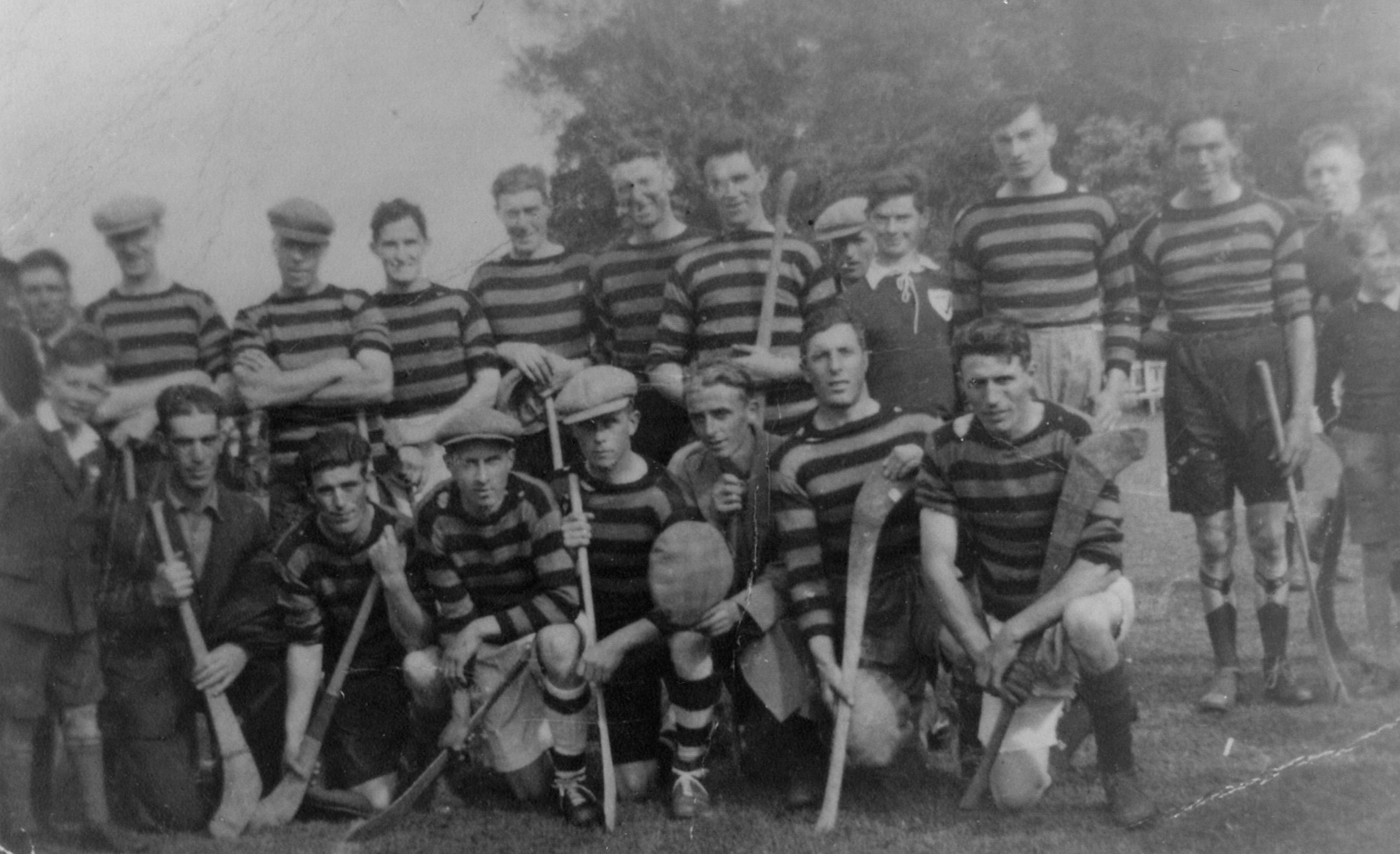
The Seir Kieran panel who claimed both the 1937 Offaly Junior Hurling Title and the 1938 Offaly Intermediate Hurling Title by beating North Portarlington, August 1938 in Tullamore

Seir Kieran were a diminished force after Killeen moved to Killdangan in North Tipperary in the mid-1930s, but they recovered to claim the Offaly Intermediate hurling final of 1938 against North Portarlington. Played at Tullamore on 27 August 1938, this match also served as the Junior final of 1937, with the result that Seir Kieran won both titles in the same game. In 1939, the team advanced to the Offaly Senior hurling final against Coolderry. Coolderry won by 6-4 to 2-2 to claim their 14th title.

In the 1940s, Seir Kieran won a number of Intermediate hurling titles. Seir Kieran won the 1943 final against Clara by 7-5 to 5-1. After winning a replay in the 1947 semi-final (won by 3-6 to 3-2), Seir Kieran won the Intermediate final against Carrig & Riverstown by 5-3 to 2-4. Although the team made little headway the following year, the club took some heart from Seamus Mulrooney's displays with Offaly in the 1948 Leinster Minor Hurling Championship.

=== Junior success 1950 to 1969 ===
During the 1950s, emigration impacted the club. Also, in June 1952, John Dooley of Clashroe, Roscomroe was fatally injured by an accidental blow to the head when playing for Seir Kieran, which further shook the club's confidence.

Despite this, Seir Kieran sustained their Senior challenge both in 1953 and in 1954 when they reached the semi-final (which they lost to Coolderry). By 1955, though, the club could not muster 15 Senior players, and so had to concede a walkover to Shannon Rovers in the championship. The following year, at Intermediate grade, the club joined forces with neighboring parish Kinnitty with similar problems. The amalgamated team, known as "St Flannan's", won through to the 1956 Intermediate Hurling final against Ferbane. St Flannan's (wearing green and white) emerged victorious by 4-7 to 4-1. Promoted to Senior grade in 1957, St Flannan's were defeated in their opening match to Shannon Rovers – a result which put an end to the Kinnitty-Clareen combination.

By 1958, the club was again playing under the Seir Kieran banner and won passage to the 1958 Junior Hurling final. Delayed until 8 March 1959, this final saw Seir Kieran defeating St Columba's (Durrow) by 4-6 to 1-1. This was the parish's fourth title at Junior grade. A reporter for the Midland Tribune described the challenge that this posed to the club's viability, especially once they stepped up to Senior grade in 1960 and 1961:

"Coolderry had a few newcomers but Seir Kieran were less lucky. Limited to the smallest parish in Ireland, they had to rely on several veterans who still keep the colours flying, and here lay their weakness – the lack of vigorous youth. That they still maintain a Senior team is a tribute to the players and club officials; that they take to the field year after year with high hopes is a tribute to all concerned."

Another boost came in October 1961, with the acquisition of six acres adjacent to Clareen crossroads, as a permanent home for the club. Development of these facilities was coupled with more organised training of players and Seir Kieran defeated the new St. Rynagh's GAA club (Banagher and Cloghan combined) in the Junior hurling semi-final of 1962. However, in the final on 21 October, they were defeated (3-10 to 1-1). against Edenderry in Tullamore.

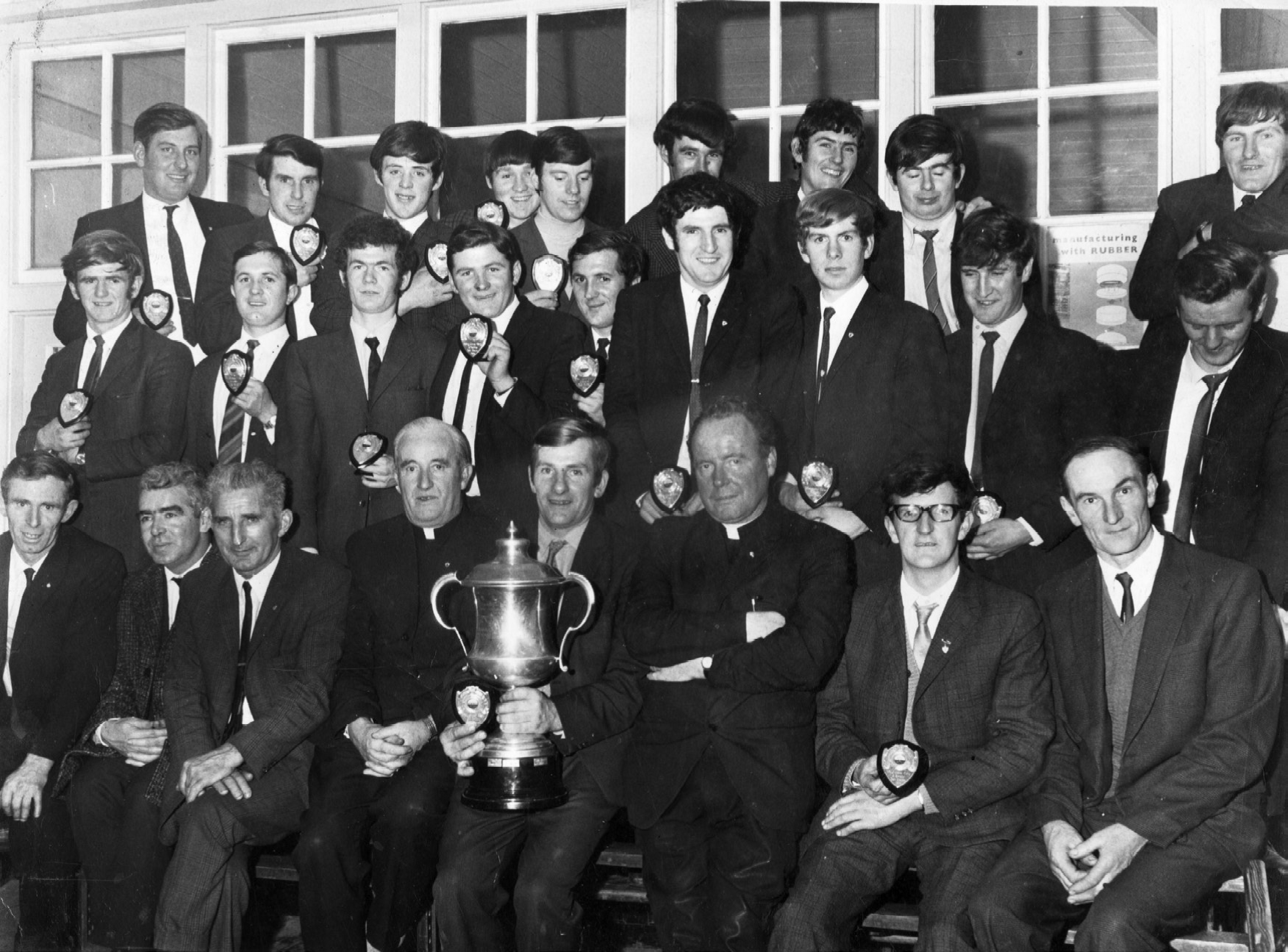
The Seir Kieran panel that won the Offaly Junior Hurling Title of 1969

In the 1965 Offaly JHC, Kinnitty needed three attempts before beating Seir Kieran by 2-10 to 3-6. In 1968, a last-minute Joe McKenna goal separated Shinrone and Seir Kieran after a replay. This led to success in 1969, when Seir Kieran became Offaly Junior Hurling champions for the fifth time. Once again, the Junior final was deferred until the following spring. On 26 April 1970, the team travelled to Tullamore and defeated Clara by the minimum (3-2 to 1-7).

=== Return to the top flight, 1970 to 1974 ===
On 7 June 1970 (in their first Senior hurling game since July 1961), the Clareen team nearly toppled reigning champions St Rynagh's. Damien Martin's goalkeeping enabled St Rynagh's to battle back for a draw (Seir Kieran 4-6, St Rynagh's 2-12). However, in the replay on 12 July, St Rynagh's won by 4-13 to 2-3.

In 1974, Seir Kieran defeated St Carthage's (Rahan) to advance to the 'B' final, played in Birr on 24 November 1974. Lusmagh took an early lead which they still held when the game was abandoned in the second half. At a County Board Disciplinary Committee hearing on the Wednesday before Christmas, both clubs were fined £20; while two Seir Kieran players and one Lusmagh player were suspended for six months.

At county level, club members Kieran Mooney and Sean Bergin represented the club in 1974, when an Offaly side recorded their first-ever win over Dublin in the Leinster Senior Hurling Championship. The semi-final against Kilkenny took place at Croke Park, where Mooney put Offaly's opening goal past Noel Skehan. Kilkenny, however, ultimately advanced without undue trouble.

=== Schools hurling and underage hurling ===
Even more encouraging for the club's future was the organized effort being made at the primary school level, led in Clareen's case by successive principals of the Seir Kieran National School: Frank McNamara; Tony Hogan; Damien White; Majella Gibbons; and Jonathan Dunne. In 1974, a team captained by Joe Dooley won Seir Kieran's first Bord na Scol hurling championship. Seir Kieran went on to clim the Offaly U-14 'B' hurling title for 1976 – its first under-age championship.

Although ultimately unsuccessful, Seir Kieran had also won through to both the Minor 'B' and the U-21 Hurling Finals of 1974. Of the Minor 'B' Final against Killeigh, the Midland Tribune reported that: "At no stage was full back Eugene Coughlan allowed to relax his most extraordinary talents". Other club members, such as Paddy Mulrooney, Noel Bergin, Jimmy Connor, Mick Coughlan, Johnny Abbott and Joe Mooney, also featured.

At the club's AGM for 1975, an intense discussion took place on how to bring on all of the young players. This resulted in something of a "new departure" for Seir Kieran – the establishment of a Minor Club with Seamus Mulrooney as its first chairman.

From the 1960s onward, the Vocational Schools and the other post-primary schools in Offaly had put emphasis on the proper preparation of their GAA teams. This process would receive an important boost with the opening of St. Brendan's Community School in Birr in 1980.

=== Late 1970s ===
In 1979, St Rynagh's bested Seir Kieran by 1-17 to 1-3 in the opening round, at Kilcormac on 5 August 1979. A St Rynagh's official expressed relief at the result saying: "When we get over that hurdle, other teams don't present quite the same problem".

Seir Kieran beat Killeigh by 2-6 to 1-4 in the next round, despite each side going down to 14 men after a fight broke out. In their last competitive game of the 1970s, on 26 August 1979, Seir Kieran beat Drumcullen by 3-11 to 0-9 at St. Brendan's Park.

=== County representation in the 1970s ===
During the 1970s, a number of Seir Kieran club members, including Kieran Mooney, represented the club in Offaly senior squad. The Offaly minors also included several Seir Kieran players.

In 1978, the Offaly Under-21 hurlers claimed the Leinster title. Noel Bergin at corner forward and Joe Mooney at wing back represented Seir Kieran. Offaly subsequently progressed to their first-ever All Ireland U-21 semi-final which ended in a 2-14 to 2-7 defeat at the hands of Galway. Also in 1978, Seir Kieran's Tony Murphy was elected to the role of hurling secretary for the Offaly County Board.

In the National Hurling League of 1978-79, the Offaly squad included a number of Seir Kieran players. This included Eugene Coughlan at corner back, Joe Mooney at wing back and Kieran Mooney at corner forward. Late in the competition in November 1978, Offaly drew with Galway. Defeat to Waterford at Dungarvan in February 1979 did not derail Offaly's advance to the league semi-final against Tipperary. Concession of frees again cost Offaly, with Paddy Kirwan (Ballyskenagh) converting a last-minute free to secure the draw (Offaly 4-8, Tipperary 1-17). Offaly were ultimately beaten in a league semi-final replay, held in April 1979 at Croke Park, by Tipperary.

Following the loss, they faced Wexford in the Leinster Senior Hurling Semi-final, fixed for Athy on 24 June 1979. Offaly began with an all-Seir Kieran half-back line of Joe Mooney, Eugene Coughlan and Kieran Mooney. Offaly were leading but conceded the frees that allowed Wexford to level the match; then Casey pointed from Tony Doran's '65, and Wexford advanced by 0-17 to 2-10.

=== Inter-county successes, 1980 and 1981 ===
During the Leinster Senior Hurling championship of 1980, the Offaly squad included Seir Kieran's Noel Bergin, with the other two Clareen players being Eugene Coughlan and Joe Mooney. The semi-final took place on 8 June 1980, when Offaly beat Dublin by 0-18 to 0-10. In the final, Offaly defeated Kilkenny, then the reigning champions, by 3–17 to 5–10. In his Evening Press column the following day, Con Houlihan depicted the post-match scene:

"But then Noel O'Donoghue made a gesture that signified that he had put in the full stop... The joy on the terraces was all-embracing. Every Offaly citizen in the stands seemed to have been catapulted onto the pitch, and we saw men entitled to free travel go bounding across the turf like young greyhounds let loose in the morning."

The Offaly hurlers advanced to their first Senior All-Ireland semi-final on 3 August 1980, where a more experienced Galway side prevailed (4-9 to 3-10).

In the 1981 championship, Offaly defeated Wexford (3–12 to 2–13) to win their second Leinster Senior Hurling Championship in a row. The Leinster Champions won direct passage to the All-Ireland final, played on 6 September 1981. The opposition were defending champions Galway. The team, which included a number of Clareen players, won the 1981 All-Ireland Senior Hurling Championship final (2–12 to 0–15) and landed Offaly's first ever All-Ireland title.

At a club level, Seir Kieran went down to Kinnitty (1-19 to 3-8) and to Ballyskenagh (4-9 to 4-7) in the 1980 Senior Hurling Championship, and to St Rynagh's (4-16 to 2-7) in 1981. The Bob O'Keeffe trophy came to the Seir Kieran National School in March 1981, along with Leinster Championship medal-holders Noel Bergin, Joe Mooney and Eugene Coughlan. There were even more energetic scenes when Offaly recorded their All-Ireland victory over Galway and the county team brought the Liam MacCarthy Cup to Seir Kieran.

=== Development of the club facilities ===
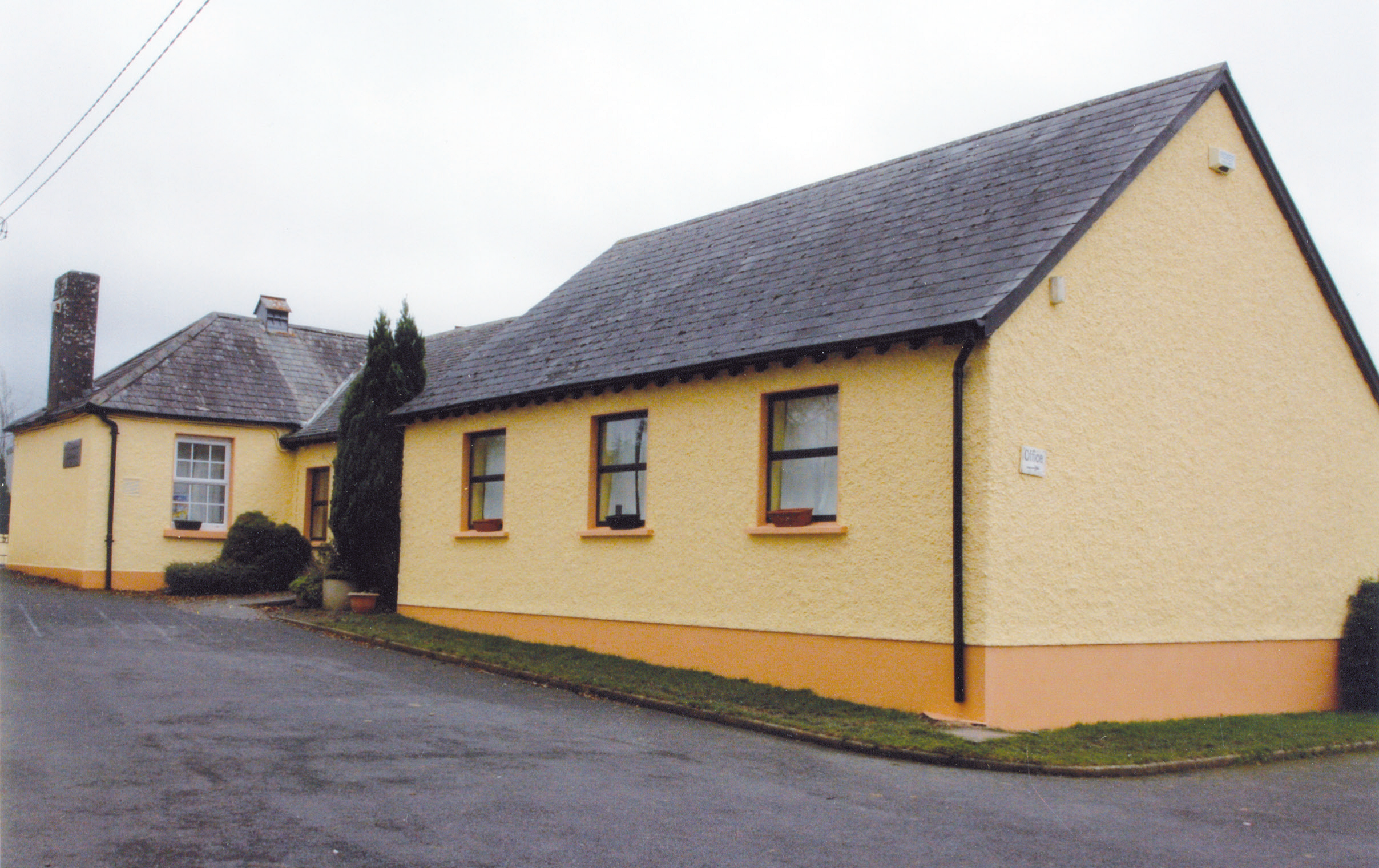
The Seir Kieran primary school pictured in late 2005, before the rebuilding of 2007–2009. The original school room is to the back and the 1983 extension is in the foreground.

In the early 1980s, the club built dressing rooms (with showers and toilets), put a paling around the field, and installed goalposts and nets. In May 1982, in a presentation to Leinster GAA clubs that took place in the Newpark Hotel in Kilkenny, Seir Kieran were nominated as Offaly's "Club of the Year in Section C". Chairman Tim Mulrooney and secretary Mick Murphy accepted the award, and attributed the success to the progress made in promoting underage hurling as much as to the work on the facilities. For example, during the 1981 Féile na nGael event in Birr, Seir Kieran had played host to young hurlers from Antrim whose club chairman subsequently recorded his appreciation:

"A Chara – I refer to the Offaly Hurling Festival for underage players which was held on the 15th to the 17th of May inclusive. This competition was an outstanding success; the precision-like manner in which it was organized was a tribute to Mick Spain and his able helpers. It was the privilege of my club to have been invited to participate in this Féile and it was most inspiring to see so many juveniles from all over Leinster display the skills of our national game. Our players were the guests of the Seir Kieran Club and its people. I wish to express our sincerest thanks to V. Rev. Seán Collier, PP, Tim Mulrooney and Michael Murphy, Chairman and Secretary respectively of the Seir Kieran Club, and the host families for their extreme kindness. Our players were overjoyed by the reception they received and they will always treasure the weekend they spent in the friendly homes of Clareen. Mise, le meas – Arty Pyke (Chairman)"

The GAA pitch saw further development and was officially opened on Monday 4 June 1984. The Minor hurlers of Offaly and Galway provided the curtain-raiser for a "friendly" between the Senior teams of Offaly and Clare (which the visitors won by 1-12 to 1-11). John Dowling, a future GAA president, gave the keynote speech. "The time has now come", said Mr. Dowling, "for Seir Kieran to promote Gaelic Games on a higher scale than ever before".

=== County semi-finalists 1984; County finalists 1985 and 1987 ===
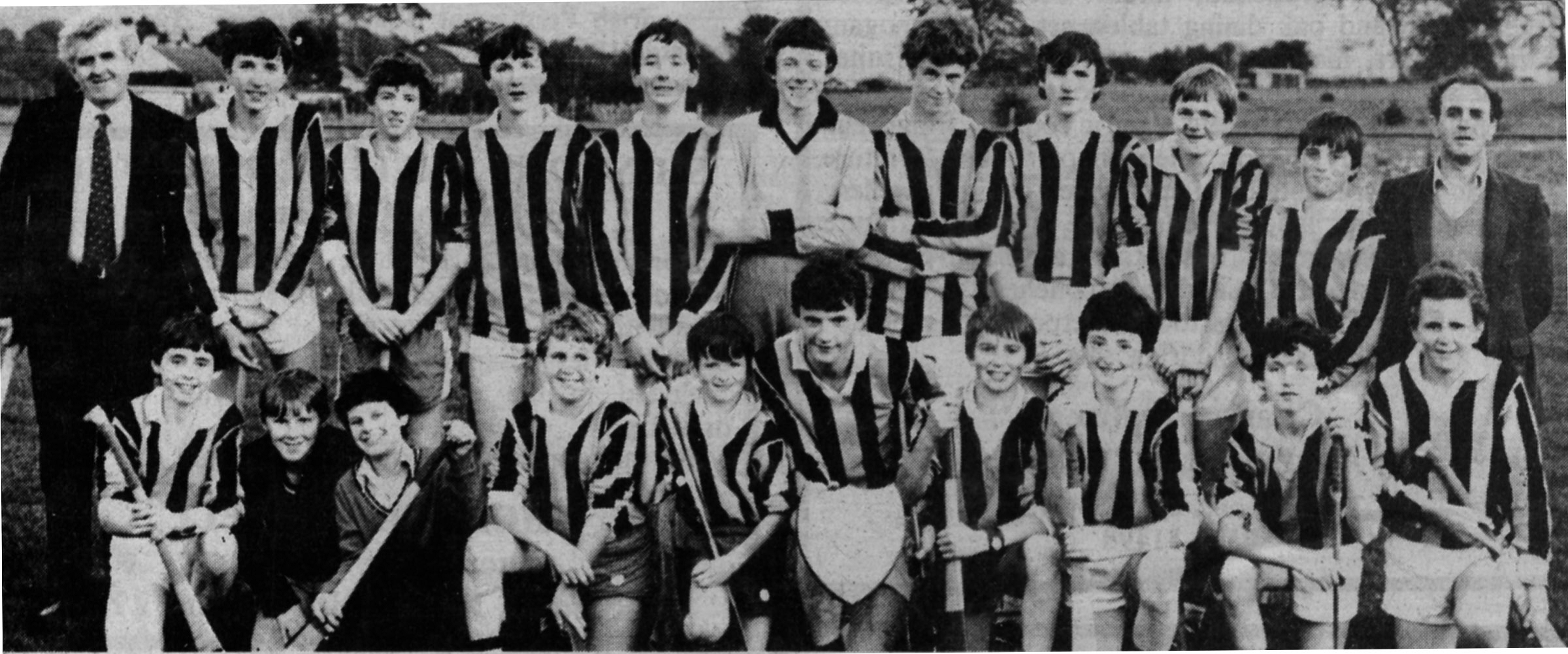
The Seir Kieran panel who won the Offaly Juvenile (U-16) Hurling Title of 1983

In their 1982 SHC encounter, Seir Kieran were eliminated by Coolderry. While also eliminated in 1983, they reached the 1984 SHC semi-final, their first since 1954, before losing to St Rynagh's.

They opened the 1985 campaign by beating St Rynagh's 2-10 to 0-12. In the game, Seir Kieran held on to a lead they had built up early on, with the Midland Tribune editor James "Bud" Burke describing the scene:

"The swash-buckling buccaneers from the good ship Seir Kieran boarded the St Rynagh's prize ship on the windy Rath sward and fighting a strong battle they subdued the opposition. However the defending St Rynagh's lads rallied and looked like repelling all boarders but Seir Kieran held on and finally hoisted the Jolly Roger."

This remained the pattern during Seir Kieran's four subsequent wins in the championship – over St Saran's (2-8 to 2-3); Shinrone (3-7 to 1-7); Drumcullen (3-8 to 2-9); and a (not yet fully amalgamated) Kilcormac/Killoughey team (2-11 to 2-4). The semi-final took place on 29 September 1985, and Seir Kieran defeated Coolderry by 1-13 to 0-13 to reach their first Senior final in several decades. As with Drumcullen in 1952, however, they encountered a Kinnitty side who were not to be denied their three-in-a-row of Offaly titles and Kinnitty defeated Seir Kieran by 3-18 to 2-8. However, All Star Awards were won by Seir Kieran's Eugene Coughlan in both 1984 and 1985 – the first such accolades for a Seir Kieran player. Coughlan was also awarded the 1985 Texaco Hurler of the Year award.

Seir Kieran failed to progress from the 1986 SHC. In 1987, their Junior team won the Hurling League Cup, while the Senior team reached the County final unbeaten after wins over Birr, St Rynagh's, Lusmagh and Kinnitty. St Rynagh's won the final 0-11 to 0-9.

=== Seir Kieran, Senior Hurling Champions 1988 ===
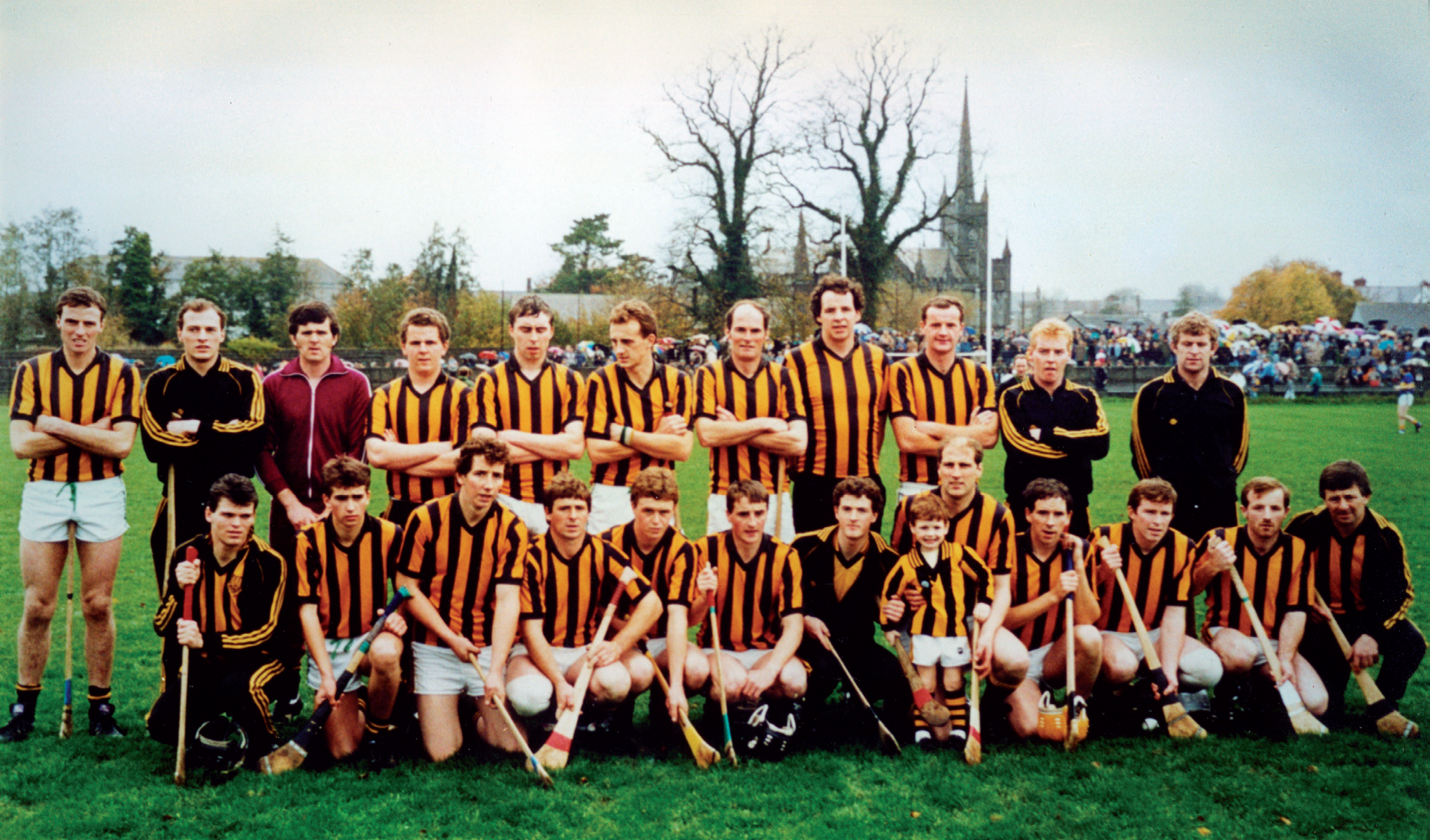
The Seir Kieran panel that won their club's first Offaly Senior Hurling title in October 1988

In 1988, Seir Kieran won both the Junior and Senior Hurling League titles, defeating Daingean and Drumcullen respectively.

In the Senior Hurling Championship, they beat Lusmagh and Coolderry but lost to St Rynagh's in the group stages. A play-off victory over St Rynagh's secured a semi-final against Kinnitty, which Seir Kieran won 5-9 to 2-10. On 23 October, they defeated St Rynagh's 3-13 to 4-6 in the county final, claiming their first Offaly Senior Hurling Championship title and becoming the tenth club to win the competition.

Eugene Coughlan lifted the Sean Robbins Cup on behalf of the 101-year-old club. The captain's acceptance speech paid tribute to the entire panel of players, their selectors, club officials, club supporters and team trainer Joe Dooley. Celebrations in Clareen continued until well into the following week. Messages of congratulation poured in from the parish's diaspora and others, while the bishop of Ossory, Dr. Forrestal, drove up from Kilkenny to convey his congratulations in person. Two weeks later, in their first match in the Leinster Club Hurling Championship, Seir Kieran beat the Meath champions Trim by 2-14 to 0-6. The Leinster Club semi-final took place on Saturday 20 November 1988 at Geraldine Park, Athy, where Buffers Alley of Wexford knocked out the Offaly champions by 1-12 to 1-7.

=== Club of the year ===
After winning the club's first Senior county championship in 1988, the Seir Kieran chairman, Pat Grogan, accepted the accolade of "Club of the Year" at the Offaly GAA Convention for 1989.

There was further celebration the following St. Kieran's Day, 5 March 1989, when it was announced that Fr. Seán Collier was being made canon of the Cathedral Chapter of St. John's, Kilkenny. The new canon, 21 years in Seir Kieran, died suddenly and unexpectedly two years later, on 21 April 1991. The first president of Seir Kieran GAA club, Canon Seán Collier had been born in Portlaoise in 1917 and ordained on 8 June 1941. Transferred to Seir Kieran as administrator in 1968, he was made parish priest in 1982. As the first incumbent parish priest to die in Seir Kieran since the 1830s, he was interred on Bell Hill beside the church. Dr. Forrestal led the requiem mass, and termed the grief of the parishioners "a genuine expression of love and respect for a parish priest who was loyal to them and had served with them to the end".

=== County finals of 1989 and 1991 ===
Seir Kieran retained the Senior Hurling League title in 1989, beating Lusmagh 3-13 to 1-10. They qualified for the SHC semi-finals after wins over Kinnitty and Kilcormac/Killoughey, then beat Birr 3-10 to 1-9. In the county final, Lusmagh scored a late goal to win 1-11 to 1-10 and claim their first senior title.

Seir Kieran reached the Senior Hurling League Final for the third time in succession on 22 April 1990, only to lose by four points to Birr. The club also failed to qualify for the last stages of the 1990 Senior Hurling Championship after play-off defeats to Birr and St Rynagh's.

In 1991, they reached the County Final after wins over Coolderry, Tullamore and Lusmagh, but Birr won the final 1-12 to 1-11 with a late score. Of the five County Finals that they had contested in the past seven years, Seir Kieran had now lost four.

=== County Championships of 1992 and 1993 ===
In 1992, Seir Kieran recovered from a defeat to Birr with wins over Kinnitty, Kilcormac/Killoughey and Coolderry to reach the SHC semi-final. There, St Rynagh's won 2-14 to 1-12. In 1993, Seir Kieran beat Kilcormac/Killoughey, Tullamore and Drumcullen, drew with Lusmagh and lost to Birr. These results placed them in the play-offs, where Lusmagh defeated them 4-12 to 1-15. The 1993 elimination completed a five-year period without a county championship title.

=== Reaching the County Final again – Seir Kieran in 1994 ===
Seir Kieran returned to the latter stages of the SHC in 1994. After wins over Drumcullen and St Rynagh's, they lost to Coolderry but recovered to beat Kinnitty and then Coolderry in the play-offs. A 3-13 to 0-8 semi-final win over Kilcormac/Killoughey put them into the County final, where Birr won 0-8 to 0-6. In wishing Birr the very best in the Leinster Club championship, however, Seir Kieran signalled that they were not finished yet:

"The Club appreciate and thank the entire panel and team management for a big effort from early Spring through to Final day. Despite this loss spirits have been restored and the Club will be battling for honours again next year".

The Junior team also reached the 1994 Junior 'B' final, losing 2-11 to 0-10 to Kilcormac/Killoughey.

=== County Champions a second time – Seir Kieran in 1995 ===
Martin Hanamy became the second St Rynagh's man (and the first from Cloghan) to lift the McCarthy Cup; Kevin Martin won Tullamore's first All Ireland Senior hurling medal. Even so, the Clareen homecoming, on Friday, 9 September 1994, was something special. Éamonn Cregan greatly valued Tony Murphy's role as Offaly hurling secretary. Kevin Kinahan had held scoreless Limerick's full forward Pat Heffernan. Joe, Billy and Johnny Dooley had scored a combined 2-11. Joe and Johnny Dooley became the first pair of brothers in modern times to each score a goal in an All Ireland Senior hurling final (an achievement matched only by the Power brothers of Carrickshock in the final of 2014). Three of Offaly's six All Star awards in 1994 came to Seir Kieran – to Johnny and Billy Dooley and to Kevin Kinahan. The club's priority for 1995 was to use these achievements as a springboard back to the top in the Offaly SHC.

In 1995, Seir Kieran began their SHC campaign with a 0-11 to 0-10 defeat to Coolderry before beating Kinnitty 1-10 to 0-8. Despite injuries and being reduced to 14 players, they defeated Tullamore 2-13 to 2-12, with Kevin Abbott scoring the winning point. Further victories over Kilcormac/Killoughey and Belmont secured a place in the semi-final against reigning All-Ireland club champions Birr. Goals from Eugene Coughlan and Mick Mulrooney (2), along with six points from Johnny Dooley, helped Seir Kieran win 3-8 to 1-13 and advance to the county final.

Seir Kieran drew the 1995 Offaly Senior hurling final with St Rynagh's, 1-13 apiece, before winning the replay 0-10 to 0-9 on 28 October to claim their first county title since 1988. They subsequently defeated Naomh Eoin in the Leinster Club Championship before losing to Kilkenny champions Glenmore. They also won the delayed 1994 Senior Hurling League final against Drumcullen, while Kevin Kinahan, Johnny Dooley and Billy Dooley received All-Star awards. Eugene Coughlan reflected on the county championship victory, saying:

"I have never seen players, committee members and everyone involved with the club dig so deep."

=== Back-to-back titles and attempted three-in-a-row – Seir Kieran 1996-97 ===
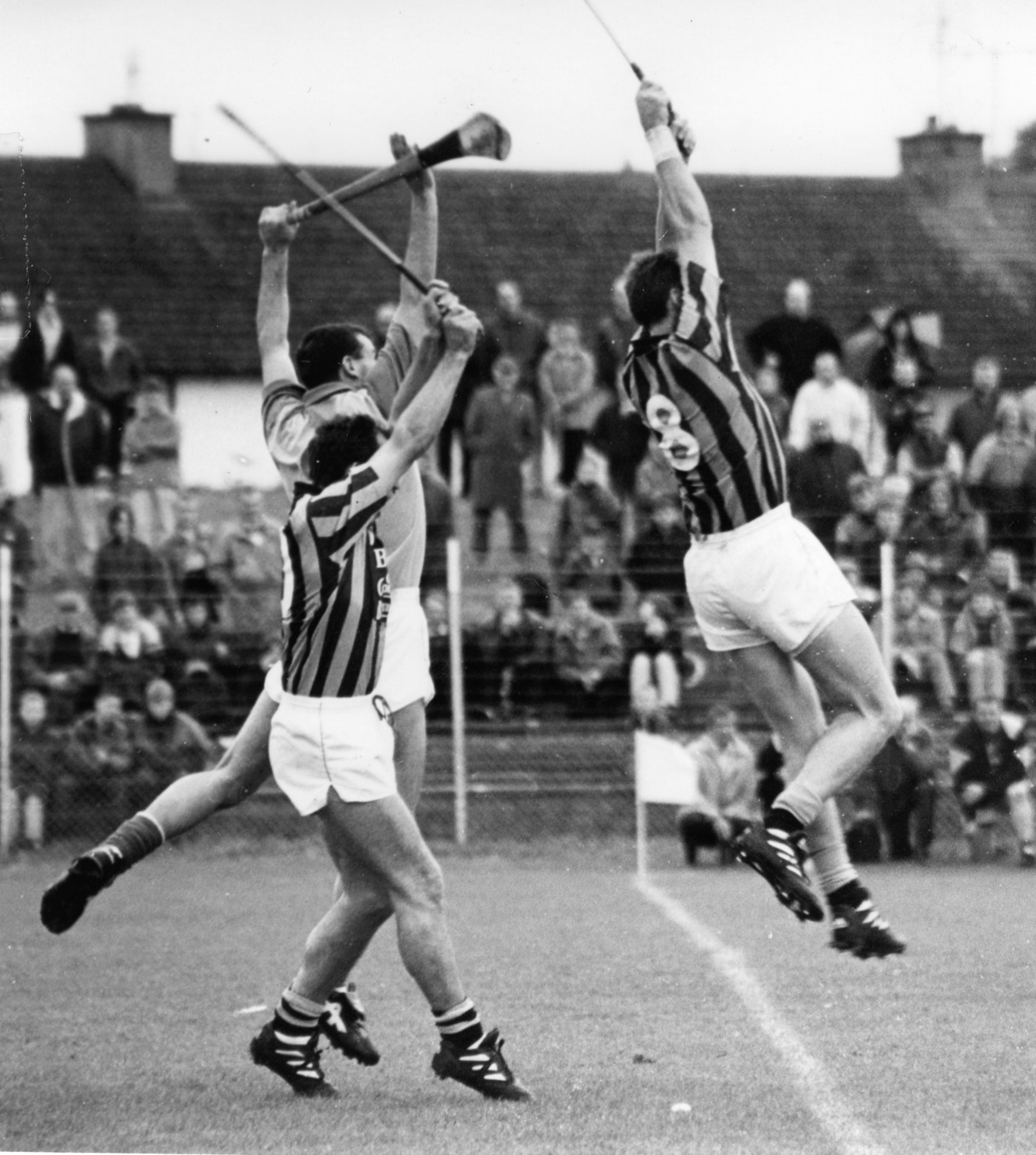
Midfield action from Seir Kieran v Kilcormac-Killoughey game, Offaly Senior Hurling Championship, September 1996

Seir Kieran were named Offaly GAA "Club of the Year" for the second time in 1996, with chairman Michael Murphy accepting the Fr. McWey Cup. In the 1996 SHC, they recorded victories over Belmont and Ballyskenagh and faced Kilcormac/Killoughey four times, drawing twice and winning twice. A 0-14 to 0-7 semi-final replay victory secured their place in a second consecutive county final against St Rynagh's. St Rynagh's selector Alo Horan commented:

"Seir Kieran were victorious last year because they wanted it more than we did. While some of their lads might not be all that skillful, they all have great spirit and would die for their parish. Certainly they will go out and give it everything on the day."

Despite the wind and rain on county final day itself (13 October 1996), Seir Kieran "gave it everything" and defeated St Rynagh's by 0-13 to 1-8 to win back-to-back Senior hurling titles. They also won the Senior Hurling League, beating Kilcormac/Killoughey 1-12 to 0-6. In the Leinster Club Championship, they defeated Trim before losing a semi-final replay to O'Toole's.

In 1997, Seir Kieran reached their fourth consecutive county final unbeaten, but lost to Birr 0-14 to 2-4. The club's Junior 'B' team also won the county championship, defeating Coolderry 2-9 to 2-4.

=== Seir Kieran's eleven championship games of 1998 ===
The Liam MacCarthy Cup stopped off in Clareen on Wednesday, 16 September 1998. Club members Joe Dooley and Kevin Kinahan also received All-Star awards in December.

In 1998, Seir Kieran recovered from early SHC defeats to Birr and Coolderry with five consecutive victories, reaching their tenth county final since 1985. They drew 0-11 to 1-8 with St Rynagh's before winning the replay 1-11 to 0-8 to claim their third senior county title in four years.

In the Leinster Club Championship, they defeated Kiltegan before losing the semi-final to Rathnure, 3-11 to 2-8.

=== Losing the crown – Seir Kieran and Offaly in 1999 ===
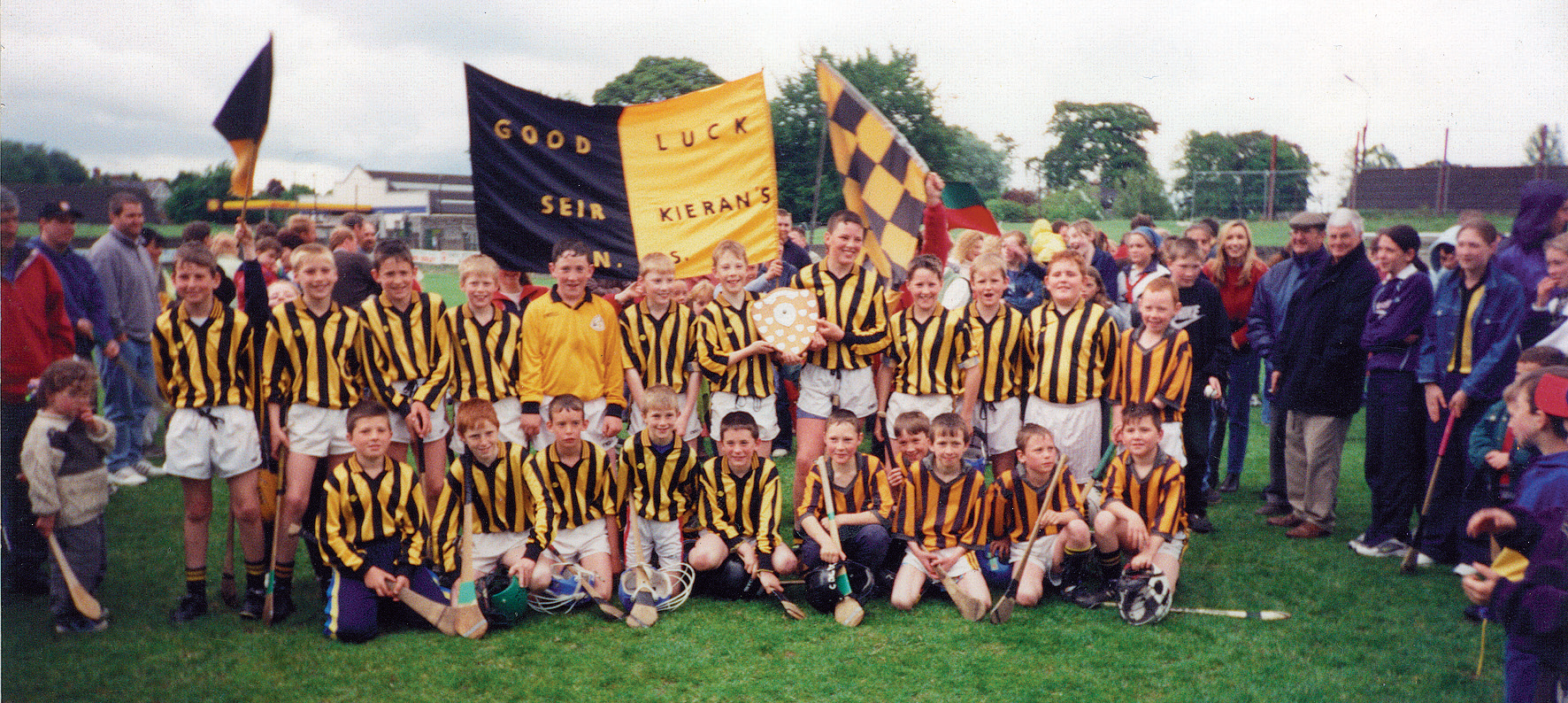
The Seir Kieran National School panel who won the Offaly U-12 'C' hurling competition in 1999

In 1999, Seir Kieran's senior team opened their SHC title defence with a win over Drumcullen, then lost to Kilcormac/Killoughey, drew with St Rynagh's and were heavily beaten by Birr. They defeated Lusmagh in the quarter-final but lost the semi-final to Birr, 3-22 to 1-7, missing the county final for the first time in six years. The Junior team reached both the league and championship finals, losing to Lusmagh and Kilcormac/Killoughey respectively.

When the 1999 inter-county championships got going, Seir Kieran again had four representatives on Offaly panel. In the Leinster Senior Hurling semi-final on 20 June 1999, Offaly saw off Wexford by 3-17 to 0-15, with Seir Kieran's panel members contributing 1-13. In the Leinster final on 11 July, Kilkenny defeated Offaly by 5-14 to 1-16. In the All Ireland quarter-final, Offaly defeated Antrim by 4-22 to 0-12. In the All Ireland semi-final on 8 August 1999, Offaly met Cork for only the second time in the Senior Hurling Championship. The Rebels won the game, played in wet conditions, by 0-19 to 0-16. In the aftermath, Johnny Pilkington expressed his side's perplexity at having played so brilliantly, and yet having lost the game:

"I don't know where it went wrong – if it did go wrong."

=== The championships of 2000 ===
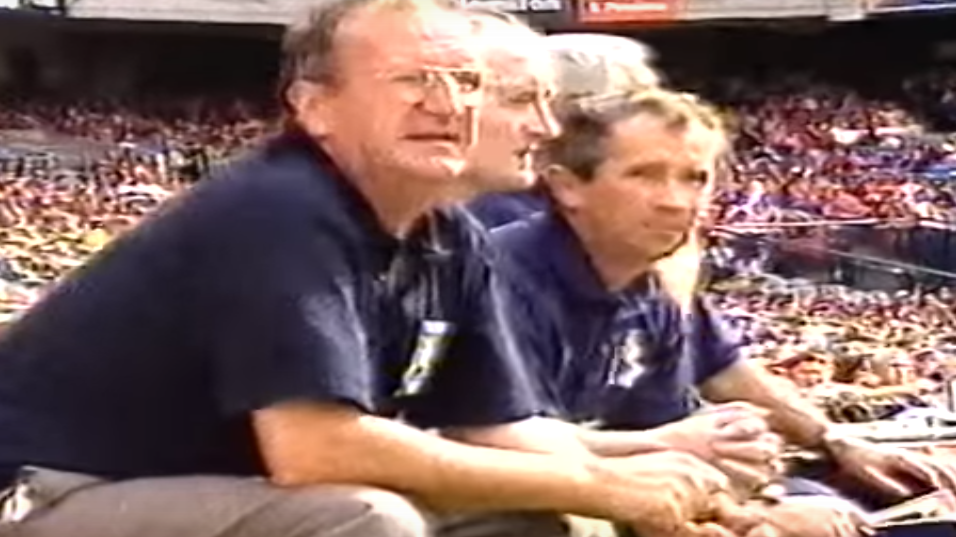
Tony Murphy, long-serving Offaly Hurling Secretary, at the All Ireland Senior Hurling Semi-final, 6 August 2000. It finished Offaly 0-19, Cork 0-15.

Pat Fleury took over as Offaly manager from Michael Bond for the 2000 season, for which Johnny Dooley was team captain. A number of Seir Kieran players represented the county at senior level and Offaly again defeated Wexford (3-15 to 0-8) in the opening round of the championship. In the Leinster Senior Hurling final, however, Kilkenny beat Offaly by 2-21 to 1-13.

The All Ireland Quarter-final took place on 23 July 2000, between Offaly and Derry. Aided by 12 points from Johnny Dooley, Offaly won by 2-23 to Derry's 2-17. In the All-Ireland semi-final against Cork, Offaly won by 0-19 to 0-15. Gary Hanniffy (Birr) got the better of Brian Corcoran, while Kevin Kinahan intercepted the balls lofted in towards Joe Deane in the second half. Joe Dooley rated this: "one of the sweetest victories of my career".

In the 2000 All Ireland final (played 10 September 2000), Kilkenny defeated Offaly by 5-15 to 1-14. Just like in 1984 and 1995, the supporters turned out for the team's homecoming in their numbers. Johnny Dooley said: "I think this is not the end of Offaly hurling". The Offaly captain would receive his third All Star Award in December 2000.

The end of Offaly's All Ireland campaign signaled the resumption of the domestic Senior Hurling Championship, in which Seir Kieran had finished level in the first round in April (Seir Kieran 1-11, Kilcormac/ Killoughey 1-11) then again against St Rynagh's in May (Seir Kieran 1-12, St Rynagh's 0-15). On 16 September 2000, yet a third draw (1-13 to 0-16) was the result against Birr. Seir Kieran's first outright win of that year's SHC finally came on 24 September against Lusmagh, when Seir Kieran made it 1-19 to Lusmagh 2-8. Next up was Ballyskenagh, whom Seir Kieran defeated 4-10 to 1-9. Against Kilcormac/ Killoughey on 3 December 2000, Seir Kieran prevailed (0-11 to 0-10), despite the match being marred by an injury to Joe Dooley. That winter was one of the wettest since records began, and was followed in early Spring 2001 by the Foot and Mouth crisis. Therefore, the 2000 Offaly Senior Hurling final did not proceed until 25 March 2001. It ended Birr 3-21, Seir Kieran 1-9 – the biggest Clareen defeat in the County final since 1952.

=== Maintaining senior status ===
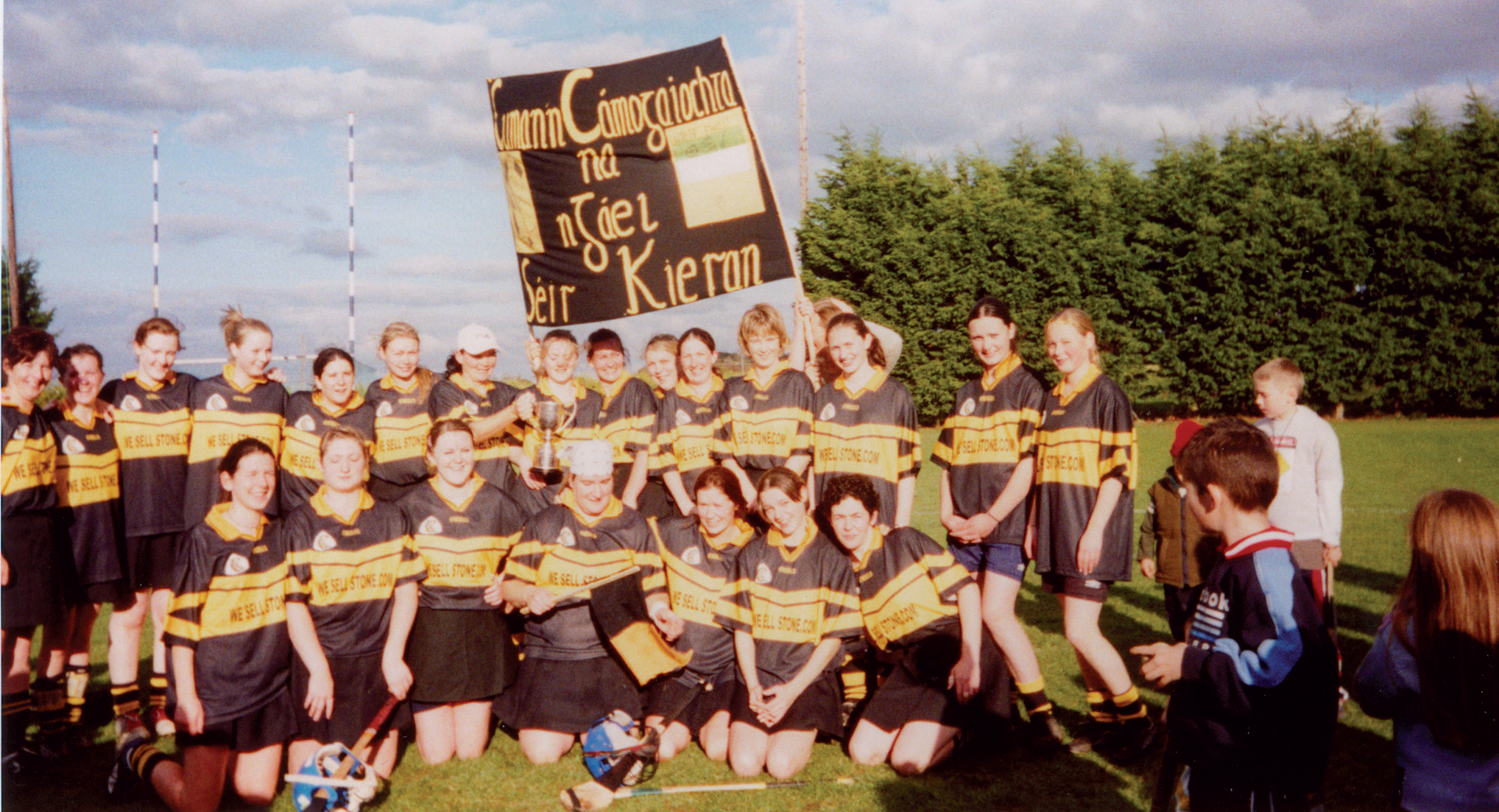
The Seir Kieran Camogie team, captained by Sandra Dunne, who won the Offaly Junior Camogie competition 2003–2004

In 2001, Seir Kieran won the Senior Hurling League, defeating Coolderry after a replay, but lost to the same opposition in the SHC quarter-final. Following several seasons without reaching the latter stages, they faced relegation in 2007 and 2008, retaining senior status. In 2009, with Joe Bergin at centre-forward, they reached the SHC quarter-final but lost to Kilcormac/Killoughey after extra time in a replay. They were also eliminated at the quarter-final stage in 2010, 2011 and 2012, although they won the Senior Hurling League in 2011. Seir Kieran reached successive SHC semi-finals in 2013 and 2014, losing to Kilcormac/Killoughey and St Rynagh's respectively.

=== Building a new clubhouse and compiling the club's history ===
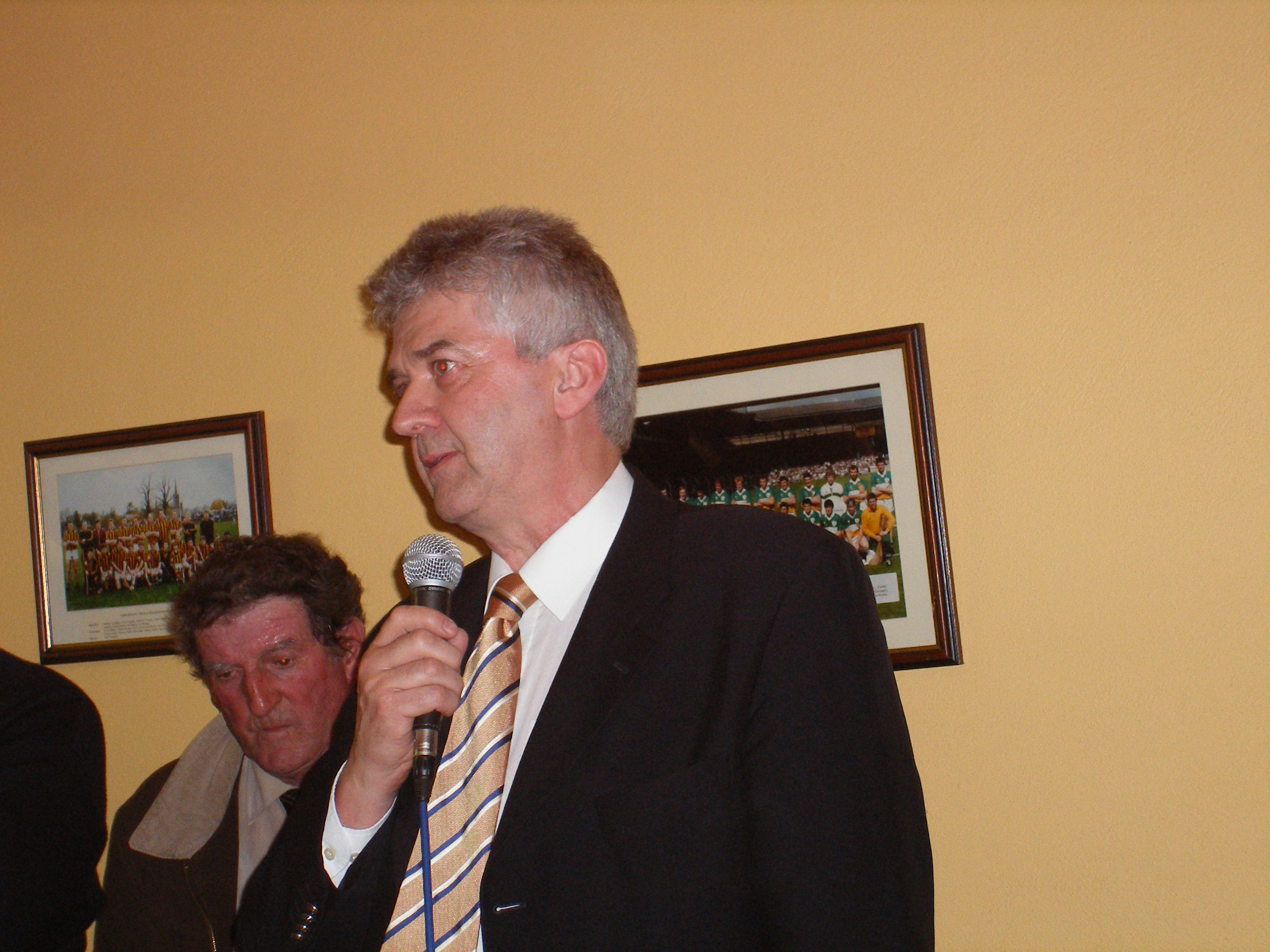
Professor Muiris O'Sullivan, UCD, speaking at launch of Seir Kieran GAA Club History

The Seir Kieran clubhouse was redeveloped in the early the 21st century. In the same time frame, the club's history, The Music of the Ash, was published. The book was written by club member Jimmy Blake and it was edited by Professor Muiris O'Sullivan of the UCD School of Archaeology. The book, of approximately 500 pages, lists the scoreline, team and opposing team for about 1,050 games between 1887 and 2001. Also included are 58 photographs and illustrations, 34 of which are in colour. Nickey Brennan, the GAA president, described the book as "a massive undertaking".

The new clubhouse was officially opened and the club history book was launched in April 2006, with speeches from Brian Cowen (politician), Ollie Daly, (then chairman of the Offaly County Board), Michael Murphy (then Seir Kieran chairman), Willie Dooley and Muiris O'Sullivan.

=== Under 21 hurling title of 2008 ===
In 2008, Seir Kieran Óg beat Kilcormac Killoughey Gaels (1-11 to 0-13) in the Offaly U-21 'A' Hurling Final. Having scored 1-6 of the winners' total, Joseph Bergin the captain lifted the P.J. Teehan Cup. Seir Kieran Óg also reached the U-21 'A' Final at Banagher in 2009, although Kilcormac/Killoughey proved too strong on this occasion. In 2010, when the panel was augmented by players from Drumcullen and Gracefield, Seir Kieran Óg reached their third U-21 Final in succession, but lost to Coolderry.

=== Junior 'A' hurling titles of 2006 and 2014 ===
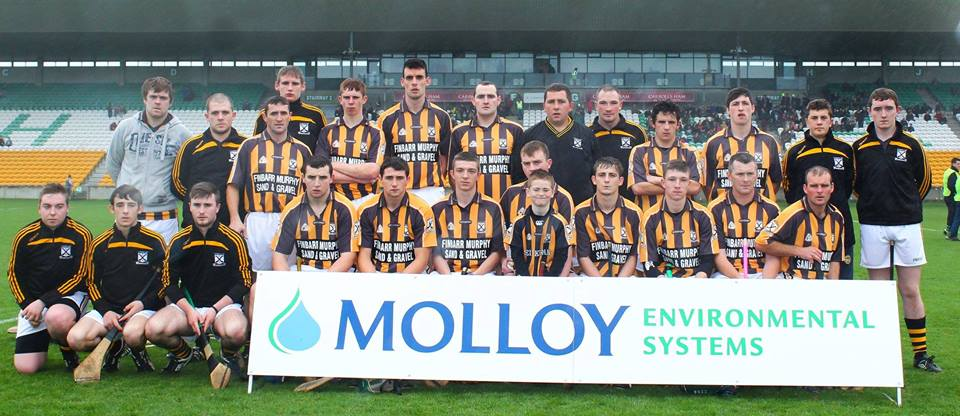
Seir Kieran, Offaly Junior Hurling Champions, 2014

Seir Kieran bridged a 37-year gap by winning the Junior 'A' final in 2006. On 29 November 2008, at Lusmagh, the club also won the Division 3 Hurling League final (Seir Kieran 1-10, Drumcullen 1-9).

On 19 October 2014, Seir Kieran beat Ballinamere by 2-12 to 1-8, to win a seventh Junior 'A' title. Earlier, on 6 September 2014 at Crinkill, the panel had beaten Birr by 4-13 to 1-13 in the final of the Division 2 League. Peadar Murray was nominated as Offaly's Junior hurling player of the year for 2014.

== Honours ==
- Offaly Senior Hurling Championship (4): 1988, 1995, 1996, 1998
- Offaly Senior B Hurling Championship (1): 2019
- Offaly Intermediate Hurling Championship (4): 1931, 1938, 1943, 1947
- Offaly Junior A Hurling Championship (7): 1912, 1923, 1937, 1958, 1969, 2006, 2014
- Offaly Under 21 'A' Hurling Championship (1): 2008
