= Clareen =

Clareen An Cláirín
- Village
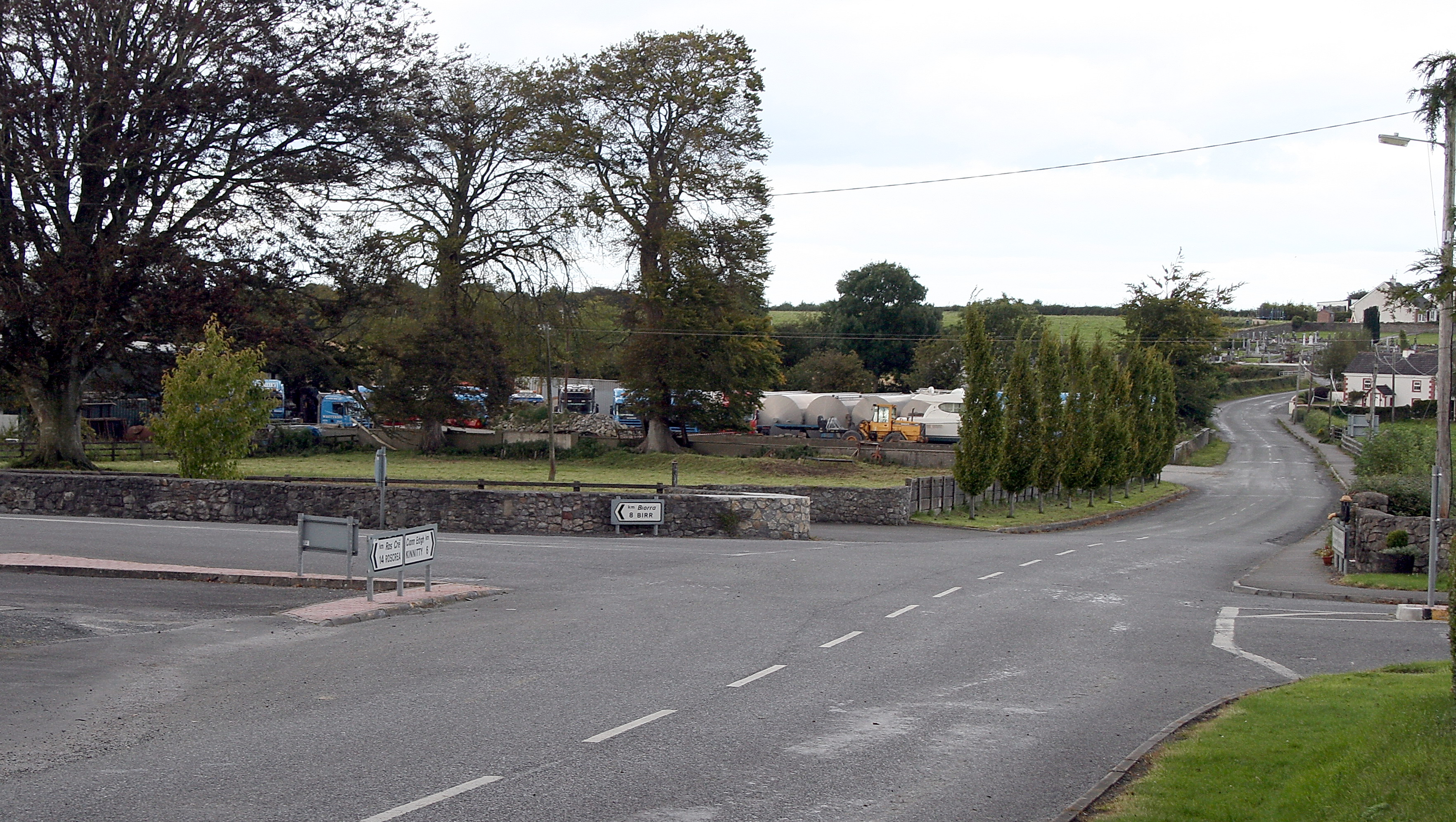
- R421 road through village

- Location in Ireland
- Coordinates: 53°04′23″N 7°47′44″W
- Country: Ireland
- Province: Leinster
- County: Offaly
- Time zone: UTC+0 (WET)
  - Summer (DST): UTC-1 (IST (WEST))

Clareen (Irish: An Cláirín, meaning 'little plain') is a village in the parish of Seir Kieran in County Offaly, Ireland. It is located 8 km east of Birr on the R421 regional road.

The village is situated at the foot of the Slieve Bloom Mountains. It is the location of a Church of Ireland church (built in 1840 in the grounds of the Monastic site), a Roman Catholic church (built in 1901 on the south-eastern slope of Bell Hill), the Seir Kieran National School (built in 1874), and the Seir Kieran GAA Club (founded in 1887).

Clareen was the site of an early Christian monastery known as Seir Kieran, in honour of its founder, Saint Ciaran of Saigir. The monastery is one of the oldest Christian settlements in Ireland dating from the 5th century. From the 5th to the 11th century the monastery was the cathedral city of the Diocese of Ossory. The monastery declined in significance from the 11th century onwards and is now in ruins. All that remains of the early monastery are the stump of a round tower and the base of a high cross. Still inside the boundary of the former monastery is a ringwork. There is a holy well and "rag tree" located nearby.

== See also ==
- List of towns and villages in Ireland
