= Conor Slevin =

Irish hurler

Personal information
- Native name: Conchur Ó Sléibhín (Irish)
- Born: 1992 (age 33–34) Kilcormac; County Offaly, Ireland

Sport
- Sport: Hurling
- Position: Goalkeeper
Club
- Years: Club
- 2009-present: Kilcormac–Killoughey
Club titles
- Offaly titles: 6
- Leinster titles: 1
- All-Ireland Titles: 0
College
- Years: College
- Galway-Mayo IT
Inter-county
- Years: County
- 2014-2018: Offaly
Inter-county titles
- Leinster titles: 0
- All-Irelands: 0
- NHL: 0
- All Stars: 0

Conor Slevin (born 1992) is an Irish hurler. At club level he plays with Kilcormac–Killoughey, while he has also lined out at inter-county level in various grades with Offaly.

== Career ==
Slevin played hurling while a student at Kilcormac Vocational School. It was during his time here that he was selected to the Offaly team that took part in the All-Ireland Vocational Schools' SHC. At club level, Slevin first played for the Kilcormac–Killoughey senior team in 2009. He has since won six Offaly SHC medal, including two as team captain. Slevin has also won a Leinster Club SHC medal.

At inter-county level, Slevin first played for Offaly as a member of the under-21 team. He made his senior team debut in a National Hurling League game against Antrim in March 2014. Slevin made a number of league appearances over the following few years, with his last appearance also coming against Antrim in 2018.

== Personal life ==
His brother, Ciarán Slevin, also played for Kilcormac–Killoughey and the Offlay senior team.

== Honours ==
Kilcormac–Killoughey

- Leinster Senior Club Hurling Championship: 2012
- Offaly Senior Hurling Championship: 2012, 2013, 2014, 2017, 2023 (c), 2024 (c)
