= Damien Kilmartin =

Irish hurler

Personal information
- Native name: Damien Mac Giolla Mhártain (Irish)
- Born: 1988 (age 37–38) Kilcormac, County Offaly, Ireland

Sport
- Sport: Hurling
- Position: Midfield
Club
- Years: Club
- Kilcormac–Killoughey
Club titles
- Offaly titles: 6
- Leinster titles: 1
- All-Ireland Titles: 0
Inter-county
- Years: County
- 2008-2014: Offaly
Inter-county titles
- Leinster titles: 0
- All-Irelands: 0
- NHL: 0
- All Stars: 0

Damien Kilmartin (born 1988) is an Irish hurler. At club level he plays with Kilcormac–Killoughey and at inter-county level he played with the Offaly senior hurling team.

== Career ==
Kilmartin first played for the Kilcormac–Killoughey club at juvenile and underage levels before progressing to adult level. He was of a successful era for the club and won six Offaly SHC medals between 2012 and 2024. Kilmartin also won a Leinster Club SHC medal and was an All-Ireland Club SHC runners-up in 2013.

At inter-county level, Kilmartin first played for Offaly as a Gaelic footballer with the minor team in 2006. He was part of the team that won the Leinster MFC title that year. He later lined out with the Offaly under-21 team as a hurler. Kilmartin made his senior team debut in a National Hurling League game against Limerick in March 2008. He made a number of league appearances over the following few years, with his last appearance coming against Cork in March 2014.

== Honours ==
Kilcormac–Killoughey

- Leinster Senior Club Hurling Championship: 2012
- Offaly Senior Hurling Championship: 2012, 2013, 2014, 2017, 2023, 2024
