= 2013 All-Ireland Senior Club Hurling Championship final =

2013 All-Ireland Senior Club Hurling Championship Final
- Event: 2012–13 All-Ireland Senior Club Hurling Championship
Kilcormac/Killoughey	St. Thomas'
1-9	1-11
- Date: 17 March 2013
- Venue: Croke Park, Dublin
- Man of the Match: Richie Murray
- Referee: John Sexton (Cork)
- Attendance: 28,928

The 2013 All-Ireland Senior Club Hurling Championship final was a hurling match played at Croke Park on 17 March 2013 to determine the winners of the 2012–13 All-Ireland Senior Club Hurling Championship, the 43rd season of the All-Ireland Senior Club Hurling Championship, a tournament organised by the Gaelic Athletic Association for the champion clubs of the four provinces of Ireland. The final was contested by Kilcormac/Killoughey of Offaly and St. Thomas' of Galway, with St. Thomas' winning by 1–11 to 1–9.

The All-Ireland final between Kilcormac/Killoughey and St. Thomas' was a unique occasion as it was the first ever championship meeting between the two teams. Similarly, both sides were appearing in their first ever All-Ireland decider.

In the week before the final Kilcormac/Killoughey suffered a huge blow with injury to key attacker Dan Currams, however, they started well thanks to the accuracy of Ciarán Slevin.

The game was extremely tight in the opening ten minutes with Kilcormac/Killoughey taking the lead three times with St. Thomas' drawing level on each occasion. The Galway side claimed the lead for the first time in the 16th minute following a Conor Cooney pointed free. Immediately from Conor Slevin's puck out Kilcormac/Killoughey moved the ball upfield with a high-ball delivered on top of their full-forward line, and former Tipperary hurler Trevor Fletcher kicking it to the net. St. Thomas's remained composed and after a Conor Cooney point, they took the lead in the 24th minute when Richie Murray followed up a Cooney effort to push the Galway side into a 1–5 to 1–3 lead. Kilcormac/Killoughey fought back but St. Thomas's led by 1–7 to 1–5 at the break.

With heavy rain prevailing and the skies becoming dusky Croke Park officials opted to turn on the floodlights for the second half. Ciaran Slevin opened the second half account in the 35th minute. Two further scores followed from Slevin to push Kilcormac 1–8 to 1-7 ahead, with a Fletcher point extending that lead to two points by the 42nd minute. The Offaly champions were dealt a major blow in the 51st minute after Killian Leonard was shown a straight red card after lashing out on the advancing Darragh Burke. St. Thomas' took the lead a minute later after Conor Cooney fired his fourth point, and although there were chances for Kilcormac/Killoughey to take scores, they failed to convert them. Kilmartin followed Leonard in being sent off, after receiving his second yellow card with two minutes remaining. Cooney sealed victory in injury time with his fifth point and a 1–11 to 1–9 victory for St. Thomas'.

St. Thomas' All-Ireland victory was their first ever. They became the 24th club to win the All-Ireland title.

== Match ==
=== Details ===
17 March 2015
14:00

Kilcormac/Killoughey	1-7 - 1-9	St. Thomas'
Ciaran Slevin (7f, 1 sideline) 0-8; T Fletcher 1-1.	Report	C Cooney (3f) 0-5; Richie Murray 1-02; J Regan, A Kelly, B Burke, K Burke 0-1 each.

Croke Park, Dublin
Attendance: 28,928
Referee: J Sexton (Cork)
