= Peter Geraghty =

Irish hurler (born 1993)

Personal information
- Native name: Peadar Mag Oireachtaigh (Irish)
- Born: 1993 (age 32–33) Kilcormac, County Offaly, Ireland

Sport
- Sport: Hurling
- Position: Left wing-forward
Club
- Years: Club
- Kilcormac–Killoughey
Club titles
- Offaly titles: 6
- Leinster titles: 1
- All-Ireland Titles: 0
Inter-county*
Years	County	Apps (scores)
2014–2020	Offaly	9 (0-05)
Inter-county titles
- Leinster titles: 0
- All-Irelands: 0
- NHL: 0
- All Stars: 0
- *Inter County team apps and scores correct as of 20:34, 22 December 2024.

Peter Geraghty (born 1993) is an Irish hurler. At club level he plays with Kilcormac–Killoughey and at inter-county level he played with the Offaly senior hurling team.

He is currently teaching at Our Ladys Bower in Athlone, County Westmeath

== Career ==
Geraghty first played for the Kilcormac–Killoughey club at juvenile and underage levels before progressing to adult level. His career coincided with a successful era for the club and he won six Offaly SHC medals between 2012 and 2024. Geraghty also won a Leinster Club SHC medal and was an All-Ireland Club SHC runner-up in 2013.

At inter-county level, Geraghty first played for Offaly during a two-year tenure with the minor team in 2010 and 2011. He later spent two unsuccessful seasons with the under-21 team. Geraghty made his senior team debut in a National Hurling League game against Laois in February 2014. He was a regular member of the team until playing his last game in 2020.

== Personal life ==
Geraghty's twin brother, Thomas Geraghty, has also played for Kilcormac-Killoughey and the Offaly senior team.

== Honours ==
Kilcormac–Killoughey

- Leinster Senior Club Hurling Championship: 2012
- Offaly Senior Hurling Championship: 2012, 2013, 2014, 2017, 2023, 2024
