= Ger Healion =

Irish hurler

Personal information
- Native name: Gearóid Ó hAoláin (Irish)
- Born: 22 August 1983 (age 43) Kilcormac, County Offaly, Ireland
- Occupation: Secondary school teacher

Sport
- Sport: Hurling
- Position: Full-forward
Club
- Years: Club
- 2001-2023: Kilcormac–Killoughey
Club titles
- Offaly titles: 5
- Leinster titles: 1
- All-Ireland Titles: 0
College
- Years: College
- University of Limerick
Inter-county*
Years	County	Apps (scores)
2008-2014	Offaly	13 (2-03)
Inter-county titles
- Leinster titles: 0
- All-Irelands: 0
- NHL: 0
- All Stars: 0
- *Inter County team apps and scores correct as of 21:50, 18 December 2024.

Gerard Healion (born 22 August 1983) is an Irish former hurler. At club level he played with Kilcormac–Killoughey and at inter-county level with the Offaly senior hurling team.

== Career ==
Healion first played for the Kilcormac–Killoughey senior team in 2001. He was of a successful era for the club and won five Offaly SHC medals between 2012 and 2023. Healion also won a Leinster Club SHC medal and was an All-Ireland Club SHC runners-up as team captain in 2013.

At inter-county level, Healion first played for Offaly as a member of the minor team in 2001. He made his senior team debut in a National Hurling League game against Galway in February 2008. Healion made a number of league and championship appearances over the following few years, with his last appearance coming against Antrim in 2014.

== Personal life ==
Healion's twin brother, Peter Healion, has also played for Kilcormac-Killoughey and the Offaly senior team.

== Honours ==
Kilcormac–Killoughey

- Leinster Senior Club Hurling Championship: 2012
- Offaly Senior Hurling Championship: 2012, 2013, 2014, 2017, 2023
