= Brian Leonard (hurler) =

Irish hurler

Personal information
- Native name: Brian Ó Loinín (Irish)
- Born: 1988 (age 37–38) Kilcormac, County Offaly, Ireland

Sport
- Sport: Hurling
- Position: Midfield
Club
- Years: Club
- Kilcormac–Killoughey
Club titles
- Offaly titles: 4
- Leinster titles: 1
- All-Ireland Titles: 0
Inter-county
- Years: County
- 2008: Offaly
Inter-county titles
- Leinster titles: 0
- All-Irelands: 0
- NHL: 0
- All Stars: 0

Brian Leonard (born 1988) is an Irish former hurler. At club level he played with Kilcormac–Killoughey and at inter-county level with the Offaly senior hurling team.

== Career ==
Leonard first played for Kilcormac–Killoughey at adult level team in 2005. He was of a successful era for the club and won four Offaly SHC medals between 2012 and 2017. Leonard also won a Leinster Club SHC medal and was an All-Ireland Club SHC runner-up in 2013.

At inter-county level, Leonard first played for Offaly during a two-year tenure with the minor team in 2005 and 2006. He later spent three unsuccessful seasons with the under-21 team between 2007 and 2009. Leonard made his senior team debut in a National Hurling League game against Galway in February 2008.

== Honours ==
Kilcormac–Killoughey

- Leinster Senior Club Hurling Championship: 2012
- Offaly Senior Hurling Championship: 2012, 2013, 2014, 2017
