= Kevin Grogan (hurler) =

Irish hurler

Personal information
- Native name: Caoimhín Ó Gruagáin (Irish)
- Born: 1986 (age 39–40) Kilcormac, County Offaly, Ireland

Sport
- Sport: Hurling
- Position: Right wing-back
Club
- Years: Club
- Kilcormac–Killoughey
Club titles
- Offaly titles: 4
- Leinster titles: 1
- All-Ireland Titles: 0
Inter-county
- Years: County
- 2005-2008: Offaly
Inter-county titles
- Leinster titles: 0
- All-Irelands: 0
- NHL: 0
- All Stars: 0

Kevin Grogan (born 1986) is an Irish former hurler. At club level he played with Kilcormac–Killoughey and at inter-county level with the Offaly senior hurling team.

== Career ==
Grogan first played hurling to a high standard as a student at Kilcormac Vocational School. He earned selection to the Offaly vocational schools' team that was beaten by Tipperary in the 2004 All-Ireland final.

Grogan first played for the Kilcormac–Killoughey senior team in 2003. He was of a successful era for the club and won four Offaly SHC medals between 2012 and 2017. Grogan also won a Leinster Club SHC medal and was an All-Ireland Club SHC runner-up in 2013.

At inter-county level, Grogan first played for Offaly as a member of the minor team in 2004. He later spent three unsuccessful seasons with the under-21 team between 2005 and 2007. Grogan made his senior team debut in a National Hurling League game against Derry in February 2005. He made a number of league appearances over the following few years, with his last appearance coming against Laois in 2008.

== Honours ==
Kilcormac–Killoughey

- Leinster Senior Club Hurling Championship: 2012
- Offaly Senior Hurling Championship: 2012, 2013, 2014, 2017
