= Dan Currams =

Irish hurler and Gaelic footballer

Personal information
- Native name: Dónall Ó Corráim (Irish)
- Born: 1989 (age 36–37) Tullamore, Ireland
- Occupation: Technical Graphics Teacher
- Height: 1.88 m (6 ft 2 in)

Sport
- Sport: Hurling
- Position: Centre-forward
Club
- Years: Club
- Kilcormac–Killoughey
Club titles
- Offaly titles: 3
- Leinster titles: 1
Inter-county*
Years	County	Apps (scores)
2008-present	Offaly	14 (1-13)
Inter-county titles
- Leinster titles: 0
- All-Irelands: 0
- NHL: 0
- All Stars: 0
- *Inter County team apps and scores correct as of 20:27, 15 February 2015.

Daniel Currams (born 1989) is an Irish hurler and Gaelic footballer who plays as a midfielder and centre-forward for the Offaly senior teams.

Born in Kilcormac, County Offaly, Currams first arrived on the inter-county scene at the age of sixteen when he first linked up with the Offaly minor teams as a dual player, before later joining the under-21 hurling side. He made his senior hurling debut during the 2008 championship before later joining the football side during the 2012 championship. Since then Currams has been a regular member of the hurling team, and has won one National League (Division 2) medal.

As a member of the Leinster inter-provincial team on a number of occasions, Currams has won one Railway Cup medal. At club level he is a one-time Leinster medallist with Kilcormac–Killoughey. In addition to this he has also won three championship medals.

His uncle, Liam Currams, was a dual All-Ireland medallist with Offaly.

== Honours ==
=== Team ===
Dublin Institute of Technology

- All-Ireland Freshers Hurling Championship (1): 2008

Kilcormac–Killoughey

- Leinster Senior Club Hurling Championship (1): 2012
- Offaly Senior Hurling Championship (1): 2012, 2013, 2014 (c)

Offaly

- National Hurling League (Division 2) (1): 2008

Leinster

- Railway Cup (1): 2014

=== Individual ===
Awards

- Offaly Junior Footballer of the Year (1): 2012

Sporting positions
Preceded by Joe Bergin	Offaly senior hurling team captain 2015	Succeeded by Colin Egan
