= Currams =

Currams is a surname of Irish origin. Notable people with the surname include:

- Dan Currams (born 1987), Irish hurler
- Liam Currams (born 1961), Irish hurler
