= Kevin Grogan =

Kevin Grogan may refer to:

- Kevin Grogan (footballer) (born 1981)
- Kevin Grogan (hurler) (born 1986)
