= Eddie Mackey =

Irish hurler

Personal information
- Native name: Éamonn Mac Aodha (Irish)
- Born: 1979 (age 46–47) Mooncoin, County Kilkenny, Ireland
- Occupation: Farmer
- Height: 6 ft 2 in (188 cm)

Sport
- Sport: Hurling
- Position: Centre-back
Club
- Years: Club
- Mooncoin
Club titles
- Kilkenny titles: 0
Inter-county
Years	County	Apps (scores)
2003-2004	Kilkenny	0 (0-00)
Inter-county titles
- Leinster titles: 0
- All-Irelands: 0
- NHL: 0
- All Stars: 0

Eddie Mackey (born 1979) is an Irish hurler who played as a centre-back for the Kilkenny senior team.

Mackey joined the team during the 2003 National League and was a regular member of the team for just two seasons. During that time he failed to win any honours at senior level.

At club level Mackey plays with Mooncoin.
