= Thomas Geraghty =

Thomas Geraghty may refer to:

- Thomas F. Geraghty, American legal scholar
- Thomas J. Geraghty (1883–1945), American screenwriter
- Thomas Geraghty (hurler) (born 1993), Irish hurler
