= Damien Murray (hurler) =

Irish hurler

Personal information
- Native name: Damien Ó Muirí (Irish)
- Born: 1981 (age 44–45) Coolderry, County Offaly, Ireland

Sport
- Sport: Hurling
- Position: Left corner-forward
Club
- Years: Club
- 1999-present: Coolderry
Club titles
- Offaly titles: 3
- Leinster titles: 1
Inter-county*
Years	County	Apps (scores)
2001-2008	Offaly	21 (4-84)
Inter-county titles
- Leinster titles: 0
- All-Irelands: 0
- NHL: 0
- All Stars: 0
- *Inter County team apps and scores correct as of 14:07, 12 February 2012.

Damien Murray (born 1981) is an Irish hurler who played as a left corner-forward for the Offaly senior team.

Murray joined the team during the 2001 National League and immediately became a regular member of the starting fifteen. During his inter-county playing days he enjoyed little success and, apart from a National League (Division 2) winners' medal, he failed to land any honours in the championship. Murray retired from inter-county hurling during the 2008 championship.

At club level Murray is a Leinster winners' medalist and a four-time county club championship winners' medalist with Coolderry.

== Career statistics ==
=== Club ===
Team	Year	Leinster		All-Ireland		Total	
Team	Year	Apps	Score	Apps	Score	Apps	Score
Coolderry	2004-05	2	0-09	0	0-00	2	0-09
Coolderry	2010-11	1	0-06	0	0-00	1	0-06
Coolderry	2011-12	2	0-14	2	1-16	4	1-30
Coolderry	2015-16	1	0-07	0	0-00	1	0-07
Total		6	0-36	2	1-16	8	1-52
