= Liam Watson (hurler) =

Irish hurler

Personal information
- Native name: Liam Mac Uait (Irish)
- Born: 1983 (age 42–43) Loughgiel; Northern Ireland
- Height: 6 ft 0 in (183 cm)

Sport
- Sport: Hurling
Club
- Years: Club
- 2001–2019: Loughgiel Shamrocks
Club titles
- Antrim titles: 3
- Ulster titles: 2
- All-Ireland Titles: 1
Inter-county*
Years	County	Apps (scores)
2002–2016 2017	Antrim; Warwickshire	17 (4–49)
Inter-county titles
- Ulster titles: 11
- All-Irelands: 0
- NHL: 0
- All Stars: 0
- *Inter County team apps and scores correct as of 17:17, 7 July 2012.

Liam Watson (born 1983) is a former hurler who played for Loughgiel Shamrocks and at senior level for the Antrim county team. He was nominated for an All Star award in 2011 and travelled to the United States as a replacement.

Watson made his first appearance for Antrim during the 2002 championship and immediately became a regular member of the starting fifteen. He won eleven Ulster medals, one National League (Division 2) medal and one Christy Ring Cup medal, the latter as a non-playing substitute.

At club level, Watson is an All-Ireland medalist with Loughgiel Shamrocks. He has also won four Ulster medals and four county club championship medals. In March 2012 he scored 3–7 when he won the All-Ireland Senior Club Hurling Championship with Loughgiel after a 4–13 0–17 defeat of Coolderry in the final at Croke Park.

He left the Antrim hurling panel in 2016 and transferred to Warwickshire. He won the 2017 Lory Meagher Cup with them, scoring 11 points on the day.

He retired from the game in December 2019, aged 36.

== Career statistics ==
=== Club ===
As of match played 23 October 2016.

Team	Year	Ulster		All-Ireland		Total	
Team	Year	Apps	Score	Apps	Score	Apps	Score
Loughgiel Shamrocks	2010–11	2	1–13	1	0–3	3	1–16
Loughgiel Shamrocks	2011–12	2	1–7	2	3–23	4	4–30
Loughgiel Shamrocks	2012–13	2	1–13	2	1–13	4	2–26
Loughgiel Shamrocks	2013–14	2	0–13	1	1–6	3	1–19
Loughgiel Shamrocks	2016–17	2	0–5	0	0–0	2	0–5
Total		10	3–51	6	5–45	16	8–96

== Honours ==
- Antrim Senior Hurling Championship (11): 2002, 2003, 2004, 2005, 2006, 2007, 2008, 2009, 2010, 2011, 2012
- National Hurling League Division 2 (1): 2003
- Christy Ring Cup (1): 2006
- Walsh Cup (1): 2008
- Ulster Under-21 Hurling Championship (2): 2001, 2002
- Ulster Minor Hurling Championship (2): ?
- Antrim Senior Hurling Championship (4): 2010, 2011, 2012, 2013
- Ulster Senior Club Hurling Championship (4): 2010, 2011, 2012, 2013
- All-Ireland Senior Club Hurling Championship (1): 2012
- Lory Meagher Cup (1): 2017
