= 2003 National Hurling League =

72nd season of the National Hurling League

League details
- Dates: 22 February 2003 – 5 May 2003
- Teams: 32

League champions
- Winners: Kilkenny (11th win)
- Captain: Charlie Carter
- Manager: Brian Cody

League runners-up
- Runners-up: Tipperary
- Captain: Brian O'Meara
- Manager: Michael Doyle

Other division winners
- Division 2: Antrim
- Division 3: Mayo

The 2003 National Hurling League was the 72nd seasons of the National Hurling League.

== Division 1 ==
National Hurling League Division 1
- Season: 2003
- Champions: Kilkenny; 11th National League title Captain: Charlie Carter; Manager: Brian Cody
- Relegated: Derry
- Matches: 49
- Top goalscorer: Eoin Kelly (6-56)
- Biggest home win: Limerick 5-26 - 0-10 Dublin (27 April 2003)
- Biggest away win: Dublin 6-19 - 3-11 Derry (13 April 2003)
- All statistics correct as of 26 April 2017.

Kilkenny came into the season as defending champions of the 2002 season. Laois entered Division 1 as the promoted team.

On 5 May 2003, Kilkenny won the title following a 5–14 to 5–13 win over Tipperary in the final. It was their second league title in succession and their 11th National League title overall.

Derry, who lost all of their group stage matches, were relegated from Division 1 after losing all of their matches in the relegation group. Antrim won Division 2 and secured promotion to the top tier.

Tipperary's Eoin Kelly was the Division 1 top scorer with 6-56.

=== Division 1A table ===
Pos	Team	Pld	W	D	L	Pts	Notes
1	Kilkenny	5	5	0	0	10	Advanced to Group 1
2	Clare	5	3	0	2	6	Advanced to Group 1
3	Galway	5	2	0	3	4	Advanced to Group 1
4	Laois	5	2	0	3	4	Advanced to Group 2
5	Waterford	5	2	0	3	4	Advanced to Group 2
6	Dublin	5	1	0	4	2	Advanced to Group 2

=== Group stage ===
22 February 2003 Round 1	Clare	3-18 - 1-11	Laois	Cusack Park, Ennis
	N Gilligan 1-8, D O’Connell 2-2, C Plunkett 0-3, T Griffin 0-2, B Murphy 0-1, J Reddan 0-1, A Quinn 0-1.		D Cuddy 0-6, T Fitzgerald 1-0, C Coonan 0-1, D Rooney 0-1, J Young 0-1, F O’Sullivan 0-1, E Maher 0-1.	Referee: S Roche (Tipperary)

23 February 2003 Round 1	Galway	1-14 - 1-7	Dublin	Pearse Stadium, Salthill
	R Gantley 1-4, O Fahy 0-3, K Broderick 0-3, A Kerins 0-2, K Burke 0-1, F Healy 0-1.		C Keaney 1-1, K O’Donoghue 0-2, K Flynn 0-2, S Martin 0-1, L O’Donoghue 0-1.	Referee: J Sexton (Limerick)

23 February 2003 Round 1	Waterford	0-12 - 4-11	Kilkenny	Walsh Park, Waterford
	D Bennett 0-4, K McGrath 0-4, P Fitzgerald 0-2, B Phelan 0-1, D Shanahan 0-1.		D Mackey 1-2, DJ Carey 1-2, E Brennan 1-1, H Shefflin 0-4, J Hoyne 1-0, D Lyng 0-1, B Dowling 0-1.	Referee: G Harrington (Cork)

9 March 2003 Round 2	Kilkenny	0-20 - 1-12	Galway	Nowlan Park, Kilkenny
	J Coogan 0-7, T Walsh 0-4, J Hoyne 0-3, M Comerford 0-2, D Lyng 0-2, J McGarry 0-1, S Grehan 0-1.		R Gantley 0-5, K Broderick 1-1, O Fahy 0-3, C Moore 0-3.	Referee: W Barrett (Tipperary)

9 March 2003 Round 2	Dublin	3-10 - 3-17	Clare	Parnell Park, Dublin
	C Keaney 3-1, S McDonald 0-5, S Hiney 0-2, S Perkins 0-1, P McDonald 0-1.		B Murphy 2-3, N Gilligan, 0-6, E Taffe 1-2, S McMahon 0-3, D Kennedy 0-1, D McMahon 0-1, A Markham 0-1.	Referee: D Kirwan (Cork)

9 March 2003 Round 2	Laois	2-10 - 1-16	Waterford	O'Moore Park, Portlaoise
	J Young 0-5, T Fitzgerald 1-1, D Culleton 1-0, D Cuddy 0-3, L Tynan 0-1.		D Bennett 1-8, J Mullane 0-3, K McGrath 0-2, P O’Brien 0-1, T Browne 0-1, D Shanahan 0-1.	Referee: J Kelly (Wexford)

16 March 2003 Round 3	Clare	2-16 - 1-18	Galway	Cusack Park, Ennis
	N Gilligan 2-6, B Murphy 0-3, C Lynch 0-1, J O’Connor 0-1, A Markham 0-1, F Lohan 0-1, C Plunkett 0-1, T Griffin 0-1, F Lynch 0-1.		R Gantley 0-10, D Tierney 1-0, C Moore 0-3, O Fahy 0-2, K Broderick 0-2, R Murray 0-1.	Referee: P O'Connor (Limerick)

16 March 2003 Round 3	Waterford	2-11 - 2-13	Dublin	Fraher Field, Dungarvan
	D Bennett 1-5, K McGrath 1-2, E McGrath 0-3, T Browne 0-1.		T McGrane 1-6, L Ryan 1-2, C Keaney 0-2, S McDonnell 0-1, K Flynn 0-1, T Moore 0-1.	Referee: D Kirwan (Cork)

16 March 2003 Round 3	Laois	1-8 - 1-17	Kilkenny	O'Moore Park, Portlaoise
	B McCormack 1-1, D Cuddy 0-3, J Young 0-2, J Phelan 0-1, L Tynan 0-1.		J Coogan 0-9, S Grehan 1-0, M Comerford 0-3, D Mackey 0-1, J Hoyne 0-1, B Dowling 0-1, B McEvoy 0-1, C Carter 0-1.	Referee: T McIntyre (Antrim)

23 March 2003 Round 4	Galway	2-17 - 2-13	Waterford	Pearse Stadium, Salthill
	O Fahy 2-1, R Gantley 0-5, C Moore 0-4, A Kerins 0-4, K Broderick 0-2, J Conroy 0-1.		A Moloney 2-1, D Bennett 0-4, D Shanahan 0-3, P Flynn 0-2, K McGrath 0-2, E McGrath 0-1.	Referee: B Kelly (Westmeath)

23 March 2003 Round 4	Kilkenny	2-22 - 1-13	Clare	Nowlan Park, Kilkenny
	H Shefflin 1-11, C Carter 1-1, M Comerford 0-3, J Coogan 0-3, E Brennan 0-2, D Lyng 0-1, R Mullally 0-1.		N Gilligan 0-6, T Carmody 1-1, S McMahon 0-2, C Lynch 0-1, T Griffin 0-1, F Lynch 0-1, B Murphy 0-1.	Referee: P Aherne (Carlow)

23 March 2003 Round 4	Dublin	1-8 - 3-14	Laois	Parnell Park, Dublin
	T McGrane 0-6, C Keaney 1-1, J McGuirk 0-1.		J Young 0-5, F O’Sullivan 1-1, L Tynan 0-4, E Maher 1-0, M Dunphy 1-0, D Cuddy 0-2, P Mahon 0-1, T Fitzgerald 0-1.	Referee: G Devlin (Armagh)

29 March 2003 Round 5	Waterford	2-18 - 2-15	Clare	Walsh Park, Waterford
	D Bennett 0-9, P Flynn 1-2, M Walsh 1-1, A Moloney 0-2, D Shanahan 0-2, E McGrath 0-1, E Kelly 0-1.		N Gilligan 1-5, A Markham 0-5, D O’Connell 1-0, S McMahon 0-2, B Lohan 0-1, C Lynch 0-1, T Carmody 0-1.	Referee: P Horan (Offaly)

29 March 2003 Round 5	Dublin	2-8 - 2-22	Kilkenny	Parnell Park, Dublin
	K Flynn 1-2, S McDonnell 1-0, T McGrane 0-3, B McLoughlin 0-2, F Armstrong 0-1.		C Carter 1-6, W O’Dwyer 1-2, H Shefflin 0-5, M Comerford 0-3, T Walsh 0-3, DJ Carey 0-2, J Coogan 0-1.	Referee: D Richardson (Limerick)

29 March 2003 Round 5	Laois	3-14 - 0-15	Galway	O'Moore Park, Portlaoise
	J Young 0-7, T Fitzgerald 2-0, L Tynan 1-1, L Wynne 0-3, J Phelan 0-1, E Meagher 0-1, C Cuddy 0-1.		R Gantley 0-4, M Kerins 0-3, A Kerins 0-2, O Fahy 0-2, B Mahony 0-2, K Bourke 0-2.	Referee: G Harrington (Cork)

=== Division 1B table ===
Pos	Team	Pld	W	D	L	Pts	Notes
1	Tipperary	5	4	0	1	8	Advanced to Group 1
2	Cork	5	4	0	1	8	Advanced to Group 1
3	Wexford	5	3	0	2	6	Advanced to Group 1
4	Offaly	5	3	0	2	6	Advanced to Group 2
5	Limerick	5	1	0	4	2	Advanced to Group 2
6	Derry	5	0	0	5	0	Advanced to Group 2

=== Group stage ===
22 February 2003 Round 1	Derry	1-14 - 2-16	Wexford	Lavey
	Gregory Biggs 0-5, D McGrellis 1-1, O Collins 0-4, J O’Dwyer 0-3, R Convery 0-1.		B Lambert 0-8, A O’Leary 2-1, D Ruth 0-2, MJ Furlong 0-2, M Jordan 0-2, L Dunne 0-1.	Referee: T McIntyre (Antrim)

23 February 2003 Round 1	Cork	0-15 - 0-14	Limerick	Páirc Uí Chaoimh, Cork
	J Deane 0-3, A Browne 0-3, J Gardiner 0-2, N McCarthy 0-2, T McCarthy 0-1, O Fitzgerald 0-1, B O’Connor 0-1, D Barrett 0-1, J O’Connor 0-1.		J Meskell 0-3, J Moran 0-3, O Foley 0-3, P Kirby 0-2, D Sheehan 0-1, M O’Brien 0-1, M Keane 0-1.	Referee: N Wadding (Waterford)

23 February 2003 Round 1	Tipperary	4-14 - 1-8	Offaly	MacDonagh Park, Nenagh
	L Corbett 3-3, E Kelly 0-6, B O’Meara 1-0, C Gleeson 0-3, T Dunne 0-1, M Ryan 0-1.		B Carroll 0-6, D Murray 1-0, G Oakley 0-1, C Cassidy 0-1.	Referee: P Neary (Kilkenny)

8 March 2003 Round 2	Tipperary	1-17 - 1-8	Limerick	Semple Stadium, Thurles
	L Corbett 1-3, E Kelly 0-5, T Dunne 0-3, B O’Meara 0-2, C Gleeson 0-1, M O’Leary 0-1, G O’Grady 0-1, E Brislane 0-1.		D Sheehan 1-1, J Meskell 0-4, M Foley 0-2, B Foley 0-1.	Referee: S McMahon (Clare)

8 March 2003 Round 2	Offaly	2-21 - 1-6	Derry	St. Brendan's Park, Birr
	D Murray 1-7, B Carroll 0-6, K Kelly 1-2, B Murphy 0-3, N Murphy 0-2, M Cordial 0-1.		O Collins 1-4, R Kennedy 0-1, R Connery 0-1.	Referee: E Morris (Dublin)

9 March 2003 Round 2	Wexford	1-10 - 2-14	Cork	Wexford Park, Wexford
	M Jordan 0-4, A O’Leary 1-0, B Lambert 0-2, P Codd 0-2, D Ruth 0-1, M O’Leary 0-1.		J Deane 0-6, J Gardiner 0-5, T McCarthy 1-1, A Browne 1-1, M O’Connell 0-1.	Referee: B Kelly (Westmeath)

16 March 2003 Round 3	Cork	6-19 - 1-5	Derry	Páirc Uí Chaoimh, Cork
	E Fitzgerald 2-8, A Browne 2-1, S McGrath 0-4, S Ó hAilpín 1-0, B O’Connor 1-0, M O’Connell 0-3, J Barrett 0-1, M Morrissey 0-1, N Ronan 0-1.		E Cushnahan 1-0, O Collins 0-3, S McGlove 0-1, P Curtin 0-1.	Referee: P Moore (Waterford)

16 March 2003 Round 3	Limerick	1-12 - 2-16	Offaly	FitzGerald Park, Kilmallock
	M Keane 0-7, TJ Ryan 1-0, M Foley 0-2, B Begley 0-1, E Foley 0-1, B Foley 0-1.		B Carroll 1-6, D Murray 1-2, B Murphy 0-3, K Kelly 0-2, N Murphy 0-1, N Coughlan 0-1, D Franks 0-1.	Referee: P Dunphy (Kilkenny)

16 March 2003 Round 3	Tipperary	3-21 - 1-11	Wexford	MacDonagh Park, Nenagh
	E Kelly 1-6, L Corbett 2-2, T Dunne 0-4, M O’Leary 0-3, C Gleeson 0-3, G O’Grady 0-2, C Morrissey 0-1.		P Codd 1-7, B Lambert 0-2, M Jordan 0-1, A Fenlon 0-1.	Referee: P Ahern (Carlow)

22 March 2003 Round 4	Offaly	2-17 - 1-17	Cork	St. Brendan's Park, Birr
	D Murray 1-5, B Carroll 1-3, C Cassidy 0-3, N Coughlan 0-2, B Murphy 0-1, C Gath 0-1, D Franks 0-1, M Cordial 0-1.		J Deane 0-4, J Gardiner 0-4, A Browne 1-0, E Fitzgerald 0-2, S McGrath 0-2, J Barrett 0-2, N McCarthy 0-1, M Prendergast 0-1.	Referee: T McIntyre (Antrim)

23 March 2003 Round 4	Derry	2-14 - 4-19	Tipperary	O'Cahan Park, Dungiven
	O Collins 1-11, D McGrellis 1-0, R Kennedy 0-1, D Magill 0-1, P O’Kane 0-1.		E Kelly 1-10, E O’Neill 2-1, L Cahill 1-0, G O’Grady 0-3, C Morrissey 0-2, B O’Meara 0-1, D Kennedy 0-1, L Corbett 0-1.	Referee: J Gribben (Down)

23 March 2003 Round 4	Wexford	1-14 - 0-8	Limerick	Wexford Park, Wexford
	P Codd 0-8, C McGrath 1-1, B Goff 0-2, R Jacob 0-1, D Berry 0-1, M Jordan 0-1.		C Fitzgerald 0-3, M Keane 0-3, D Sheehan 0-1, E Foley 0-1.	Referee: A Mac Suibhne (Dublin)

29 March 2003 Round 5	Limerick	6-22 - 0-9	Derry	FitzGerald Park, Kilmallock
	D Sheehan 4-2, B Begley 1-4, B Foley 1-4, TJ Ryan 0-3, M Keane 0-3, E Foley 0-1, P Lawlor 0-1, C Carey 0-1, C Fitzgerald 0-1, J Moran 0-1, N Moran 0-1.		O Collins 0-2, G Biggs 0-2, D McGrellis 0-2, R Kennedy 0-1, P Doherty 0-1, P Quigg 0-1.	Referee: J McGrath (Westmeath)

29 March 2003 Round 5	Wexford	4-18 - 1-13	Offaly	Wexford Park, Wexford
	P Codd 1-7, C McGrath 2-0, B Goff 0-4, D Berry 1-0, R Jacob 0-3, A Fenlon 0-2, L Dunne 0-1, M Jordan 0-1.		D Murray 1-8, S Weir 0-2, D Tanner 0-1, B Murphy 0-1, K Kelly 0-1.	Referee: M Wadding (Waterford)

29 March 2003 Round 5	Tipperary	4-11 - 4-15	Cork	Semple Stadium, Thurles
	E Kelly (3-5), T Dunne (1-2), B O'Meara (0-1), C Gleeson (0-1), M O'Leary (0-1); L Corbett (0-1).		J Deane (1-7), S Ó hAilpín (2-0), A Browne (1-1), M O'Connell (0-2); N McCarthy (0-2), J O'Connor (0-1); J Gardiner (0-1), B O'Connor (0-1).	Referee: B Kelly (Westmeath)

=== Group 1 table ===
Pos	Team	Pld	W	D	L	Pts	Notes
1	Tipperary	3	2	1	0	13	Division 1 runners-up
2	Kilkenny	3	1	1	1	13	Division 1 champions
3	Cork	3	2	0	1	12	
4	Wexford	3	1	1	1	9	
5	Galway	3	1	1	1	7	
6	Clare	3	0	0	3	6	

=== Group stage ===
13 April 2003 Round 1	Kilkenny	2-16 - 2-19	Tipperary	Nowlan Park, Kilkenny
	H Shefflin 0-8, DJ Carey 1-3, C Carter 1-0, T Walsh 0-2, E Brennan 0-2, R Mullally 0-1.		G O’Grady 1-6, E Kelly 0-7, M O’Leary 1-2, T Dunne 0-2, C Gleeson 0-1, L Corbett 0-1.	Referee: M Wadding (Waterford)

13 April 2003 Round 1	Clare	2-9 - 2-12	Cork	Cusack Park, Ennis
	N Gilligan 0-5, E Taaffe 1-1, T Carmody 1-0, C Lynch 0-1, T Griffin 0-1, B Murphy 0-1.		B O’Connor 0-5, A Browne 1-0, S Ó hAilpín 1-0, J Deane 0-3, N McCarthy 0-3, S McGrath 0-1.	Referee: A MacSuibhne (Dublin)

13 April 2003 Round 1	Galway	3-10 - 1-10	Wexford	Pearse Stadium, Galway
	R Murray 1-1, D Tierney 1-0, D Forde 1-0, R Gantley 0-3, O Fahy 0-2, C Moore 0-2, D Hayes 0-1, M Kerins 0-1.		R Jacob 1-1, P Codd 0-4, B Goff 0-2, A Fenlon 0-1, R McCarthy 0-1, D Berry 0-1.	Referee: T McIntyre (Antrim)

20 April 2003 Round 2	Wexford	1-15 - 1-13	Clare	Wexford Park, Wexford
	P Codd 0-9, B Goff 1-2, R Jacob 0-2, D Ruth 0-1, M Jordan 0-1.		N Gilligan 1-5, A Quinn 0-4, A Markham 0-2, S McMahon 0-1, T Griffin 0-1.	Referee: M Wadding (Waterford)

20 April 2003 Round 2	Cork	3-12 - 4-17	Kilkenny	Páirc Uí Chaoimh, Cork
	J Deane 2-3, J Gardiner 0-5, A Browne 1-0, N McCarthy 0-1, S McGrath 0-1, Setanta Ó hAilpín 0-1, T McCarthy 0-1.		H Shefflin 2-5, E Brennan 1-2, DJ Carey 1-2, T Walsh 0-4, C Phelan 0-2, D Lyng 0-1, P Tennyson 0-1.	Referee: A Mac Suibhne (Dublin)

20 April 2003 Round 2	Tipperary	3-15 - 2-18	Galway	Semple Stadium, Thurles
	T Dunne 1-3, C Gleeson 1-1, E Kelly 0-4, L Corbett 1-0, P Kelly 0-3, L Cahill 0-3, G O’Grady 0-1.		R Murray 0-8, O Fahy 1-3, D Tierney 1-1, C Moore 0-2, D Forde 0-2, A Kerins 0-1, J Conroy 0-1.	Referee: P Aherne (Carlow)

27 April 2003 Round 3	Galway	1-14 - 1-18	Cork	Pearse Stadium, Salthill
	R Murray 1-5, A Kerins 0-5, K Broderick 0-2, D Joyce 0-1, D Tierney 0-1.		J Deane 0-5, J Gardiner 0-5, B O’Connor 1-0, A Browne 0-2, S McGrath 0-2, Setanta Ó hAilpín 0-1, R Curran 0-1, T Kenny 0-1, D Barrett 0-1.	Referee: J Sexton (Limerick)

27 April 2003 Round 3	Kilkenny	0-23 - 2-17	Wexford	Nowlan Park, Kilkenny
	H Shefflin 0-13, T Walsh 0-3, C Carter 0-2, C Phelan 0-1, D Lyng 0-1, M Comerford 0-1, B McEvoy 0-1, D Mackey 0-1.		P Codd 1-10, B Goff 1-1, B Lambert 0-2, C McGrath 0-1, R McCarthy 0-1, D Berry 0-1, R Jacob 0-1.	Referee: B Kelly (Westmeath)

27 April 2003 Round 3	Clare	0-14 - 0-22	Tipperary	Cusack Park, Ennis
	N Gilligan 0-4, A Quinn 0-4, S McMahon 0-3, T Griffin 0-2, D McMahon 0-1.		E Kelly 0-6, E O’Neill 0-5, T Dunne 0-4, L Corbett 0-2, L Cahill 0-2, M O’Leary 0-2, C Gleeson 0-1.	Referee: M Wadding (Waterford)

=== Group 2 table ===
Pos	Team	Pld	W	D	L	Pts	Notes
1	Limerick	3	3	0	0	8	
2	Waterford	3	2	0	1	8	
3	Offaly	3	1	0	2	8	
4	Laois	3	1	0	2	6	
5	Dublin	3	2	0	1	6	
6	Derry	3	0	0	3	0	Relegated to Division 2

=== Group stage ===
13 April 2003 Round 1	Offaly	1-14 - 1-13	Laois	St. Brendan's Park, Birr
	D Murray 1-2, B Murphy 0-5, C Cassidy 0-2, S Brown 0-2, J Errity 0-1, G Hanniffy 0-1, S Whelehan 0-1.		J Young 0-7, L Tynan 1-0, Paul Cuddy 0-2, B McCormack 0-2, D Rooney 0-1, E Maher 0-1.	Referee: S McMahon (Clare)

13 April 2003 Round 1	Limerick	2-21 - 0-11	Waterford	FitzGerald Park, Kilmallock
	A O’Shaughnessy 2-3, C Fitzgerald 0-8, B Foley 0-2, B Begley 0-2, D Sheehan 0-2, P Kirby 0-2, E Foley 0-1, P Lawlor 0-1.		D Bennett 0-4, D Shanahan 0-2, E Kelly 0-2, M Walsh 0-1, P Flynn 0-1, T Kennedy 0-1.	Referee: G Harrington (Cork)

13 April 2003 Round 1	Derry	3-11 - 6-19	Dublin	Celtic Park, Derry
	O Collins 2-6, R Kennedy 1-1, D Magill 0-2, D McGrellis 0-1, A McCrystal 0-1.		S McDonnell 2-2, K Horgan 1-2, C Keaney 0-5, K Flynn 1-1, D O’Reilly 0-4, S Hiney 1-0, M Carton 1-0, L Ryan 0-3, R Fallon 0-1, K O’Donoghue 0-1.	Referee: J McClean (Antrim)

19 April 2003 Round 2	Waterford	4-20 - 2-4	Derry	Walsh Park, Waterford
	E Kelly 3-4, D Bennett 0-6, P O’Brien 1-1, J Kennedy 0-3, P Flynn 0-2, D Shanahan 0-2, B Phelan 0-1, D Murphy 0-1.		J O’Dwyer 2-1, M Collins 0-2, O Collins 0-1.	Referee: J Kelly (Wexford)

20 April 2003 Round 2	Dublin	3-8 - 1-13	Offaly	Parnell Park, Dublin
	T McGrane 1-6, L Ryan 1-0, G Ennis 1-0, K Flynn 0-2.		D Murray 0-5, J Errity 1-0, B Whelehan 0-3, B Murphy 0-3, B Carroll 0-1, C Cassidy 0-1.	Referee: P Neary (Kilkenny)

21 April 2003 Round 2	Laois	3-10 - 2-17	Limerick	O'Moore Park, Portlaoise
	J Young 1-4, L Tynan 1-1, K Coonan 1-0, D Rooney 0-1, B McCormack 0-1, E Meagher 0-1, M McEvoy 0-1, F O’Sullivan 0-1.		O Moran 2-3, B Foley 0-5, M Keane 0-3, D Sheehan 0-3, J Moran 0-1, M Foley 0-1, P Lawlor 0-1.	Referee: D Kirwan (Cork)

27 April 2003 Round 3	Offaly	2-16 - 4-18	Waterford	St. Brendan's Park, Birr, County Offaly
	D Murray 2-6, G Hanniffy 0-3, R Hanniffy 0-2, S Brown 0-2, B Murphy 0-1, N Coughlan 0-1, B Carroll 0-1.		P Flynn 2-5, D Bennett 0-6, K McGrath 1-2, S Prendergast 1-0, E Kelly 0-3, T Browne 0-1, A Maloney 0-1.	Referee: W Barrett (Tipperary)

27 April 2003 Round 3	Limerick	5-26 - 0-10	Dublin	FitzGerald Park, Kilmallock
	O Moran 2-1, N Moran 1-4, Michael O’Brien 1-4, P Kirby 0-5, A O’Shaughnessy 1-1, D Sheehan 0-3, J Meskell 0-3, R Hayes 0-2, J O’Brien 0-2, J Moran 0-1.		T McGrain 0-6, L Ryan 0-2, K Horgan 0-1, F Armstrong 0-1.	Referee: S Roche (Tipperary)

26 April 2003 Round 3	Derry	0-10 - 1-16	Laois	Celtic Park, Derry

=== Knock-out stage ===
Final

5 May 2003 Final	Kilkenny	5-14 - 5-13	Tipperary	Croke Park
	H Shefflin 1-6 (0-4f), DJ Carey (0-3f), E Brennan 1-3 each, M Comerford 1-2, C Carter 1-0.	Report	E Kelly 1-7 (1-3f), L Corbett, J Carroll 2-0 each, C Gleeson 0-2, T Dunne (f), E Brislane, P Kelly, L Cahill 0-1 each.	Attendance: 17,153; Referee: P O'Connor (Limerick)

=== Scoring statistics ===
Top scorers overall

Rank	Player	Team	Tally	Total
1	Eoin Kelly	Tipperary	6-56	74
2	Henry Shefflin	Kilkenny	4-52	64
3	Niall Gilligan	Clare	5-45	60
4	Damien Murray	Offaly	8-35	59
5	Paul Codd	Wexford	3-47	56

Top scorers in a single game

Rank	Player	Team	Tally	Total	Opposition
1	Donncha Sheehan	Limerick	4-02	14	Derry
1	Eoin Kelly	Tipperary	3-05	14	Cork
1	Eoin Fitzgerald	Cork	2-08	14	Derry
1	Henry Shefflin	Kilkenny	1-11	14	Clare
1	Ollie Collins	Derry	1-11	14	Tipperary
6	Eoin Kelly	Waterford	3-04	13	Laois
6	Eoin Kelly	Tipperary	1-10	13	Derry
6	Paul Codd	Wexford	1-10	13	Kilkenny
6	Henry Shefflin	Kilkenny	0-13	13	Wexford
10	Lar Corbett	Tipperary	3-03	12	Offaly
10	Niall Gilligan	Clare	2-06	12	Galway
10	Ollie Collins	Derry	2-06	12	Dublin
10	Damien Murray	Offaly	2-06	12	Waterford

== Division 2 ==
National Hurling League Division 2
- Season: 2003
- Champions: Antrim; Captain: Colm McGuckian; Manager: Dinny Cahill
- Relegated: Longford
- All statistics correct as of 26 April 2017.

=== Division 2A table ===
Pos	Team	Pld	W	D	L	Pts	Notes
1	Antrim	4	3	0	1	6	Advanced to Group 1
2	Down	4	3	0	1	6	Advanced to Group 1
3	Westmeath	4	2	0	2	4	Advanced to Group 1
4	Kildare	4	2	0	2	4	Advanced to Group 2
5	Roscommon	4	0	0	4	0	Advanced to Group 2

=== Division 2B table ===
Pos	Team	Pld	W	D	L	Pts	Notes
1	Kerry	4	4	0	0	8	Advanced to Group 1
2	Meath	4	3	0	1	6	Advanced to Group 1
3	Carlow	4	2	0	2	4	Advanced to Group 1
4	Wicklow	4	1	0	3	2	Advanced to Group 2
5	Longford	4	0	0	4	0	Advanced to Group 2

=== Group 1 table ===
Pos	Team	Pld	W	D	L	Pts	Notes
1	Kerry	3	2	0	1	12	Division 2 runners-up
2	Antrim	3	3	0	0	12	Division 2 champions
3	Meath	3	2	0	1	10	
4	Down	3	1	0	2	8	
5	Westmeath	3	1	0	2	6	
6	Carlow	3	0	0	3	4	

=== Group 2 table ===
Pos	Team	Pld	W	D	L	Pts	Notes
1	Wicklow	2	2	0	0	6	
2	Kildare	2	1	0	1	6	
3	Roscommon	2	1	0	1	2	
4	Longford	2	0	0	2	0	Relegated to Division 3

=== Knock-out stage ===
5 May 2003 Final	Antrim	3-18 - 3-12	Kerry	Croke Park, Dublin
	B McFaul 0-7; P Richmond 1-2; C McGuickian 1-3; G O’Kane 1-1; L Richmond 0-2; S Delargy 0-1; C Herron 0-1, P Close 0-1.	Report	S Brick 2-4 (4 Fs); M Slattery 1-3; Billy Brick (0-3); Pat O’Connell (0-2).	Referee: B Kelly (Westmeath)

== Division 3 ==
National Hurling League Division 3
- Season: 2003
- Champions: Mayo
- All statistics correct as of 26 April 2017.

=== Division 3A table ===
Pos	Team	Pld	W	D	L	Pts	Notes
1	Sligo	4	3	0	1	6	Advanced to Group 1
2	Mayo	4	3	0	1	6	Advanced to Group 1
3	Armagh	4	2	0	2	4	Advanced to Group 1
4	Donegal	4	2	0	2	4	Advanced to Group 1
5	Leitrim	4	0	0	4	0	Advanced to Group 1

=== Division 3B table ===
Pos	Team	Pld	W	D	L	Pts	Notes
1	Monaghan	4	4	0	0	8	Advanced to Group 1
2	Louth	4	3	0	1	6	Advanced to Group 1
3	Tyrone	4	2	0	2	4	Advanced to Group 1
4	Cavan	4	1	0	3	2	Advanced to Group 1
5	Fermanagh	4	0	0	4	0	Advanced to Group 1

=== Group 1 table ===
Pos	Team	Pld	W	D	L	Pts	Notes
1	Mayo	3	3	0	0	12	Division 3 champions
2	Sligo	3	2	0	1	10	Division 3 runners-up
3	Louth	3	2	0	1	10	
4	Monaghan	3	0	1	2	9	
5	Armagh	3	1	1	1	7	
6	Tyrone	3	0	0	3	4	

=== Group 2 table ===
Pos	Team	Pld	W	D	L	Pts	Notes
1	Donegal	2	2	0	0	8	
2	Leitirm	3	2	0	1	4	
3	Cavan	2	0	0	2	2	
4	Fermanagh	3	1	0	2	2	

=== Knock-out stage ===
Final

5 May 2003 Final	Mayo	2-11 - 2-6	Sligo	MacHale Park, Castlebar
