= Colin Egan =

Irish sportsperson

Personal information
- Native name: Cóilín Mac Aogáin (Irish)
- Born: 1989 (age 36–37) Belmont, County Offaly, Ireland

Sport
- Sport: Hurling
- Position: Centre-back
Club
- Years: Club
- Belmont
Club titles
- Offaly titles: 0
Inter-county*
Years	County	Apps (scores)
2009-present	Offaly	11 (4-7)
Inter-county titles
- Leinster titles: 0
- All-Irelands: 0
- NHL: 0
- All Stars: 0
- *Inter County team apps and scores correct as of 18:11, 26 June 2011.

Colin Egan (born 1989 in Belmont, County Offaly, Ireland) is an Irish sportsperson. He plays hurling with his local club Belmont and has been a member of the Offaly senior inter-county team since 2011.

== Playing career ==
=== Club ===
Egan plays his club hurling with Belmont.

=== Inter-county ===
Egan has lined out in all grades for Offaly. He started in 2007 as a member of the county's minor hurling team before subsequently joining the Offaly under-21 team. In 2008 he lined out in the Leinster under-21 decider, however, Kilkenny won that game easily.

Egan was just out of the under-21 grade when he joined the Offaly senior hurling team in 2011. He made his debut as a substitute in a National Hurling League game against Kilkenny, however, he failed to secure a place on the starting fifteen. Egan made his championship debut at wing-forward against Dublin in 2011.

== Media career ==
In 2016, Egan and his family competed in the fourth series of the popular RTÉ reality competition, Ireland's Fittest Family. They were eliminated in the first round of the competition.

Sporting positions
Preceded by Dan Currams	Offaly Senior Hurling Captain; 2016	Succeeded by Incumbent
