= 2010–11 All-Ireland Senior Club Hurling Championship =

All-Ireland Senior Club Hurling Championship 2010–11

Championship Details
- Dates: 10 October 2010 – 17 March 2011
- Teams: 15

All Ireland Champions
- Winners: Clarinbridge (1st win)
- Captain: Paul Callanan
- Manager: Micheál Donoghue

All Ireland Runners-up
- Runners-up: O'Loughlin Gaels
- Captain: Martin Comerford
- Manager: Michael Nolan

Provincial Champions
- Munster: De La Salle
- Leinster: O'Loughlin Gaels
- Ulster: Loughgiel Shamrocks
- Connacht: Not Played

Championship Statistics
- Matches Played: 15
- Total Goals: 40 (2.66 per game)
- Total Points: 411 (27.40 per game)
- Top Scorer: Mark Bergin (1–29)

The 2010–11 All-Ireland Senior Club Hurling Championship was the 41st staging of Ireland's premier competition at inter-county level for hurling clubs. A total of fifteen teams competed in the championship, with Clarinbridge defeating O'Loughlin Gaels by 2-18 to 0-12 in the final at Croke Park, Dublin.

The championship began on 10 October 2010 and concluded on 17 March 2011.

== Pre-championship ==
Barring a win for Loughgiel Shamrocks, a new club will be crowned All-Ireland champions on St. Patricks's Day as the remaining participants have never claimed the championship title. The Shamrocks claimed the championship in 1982–83, however, their campaign is expected to end in the All-Ireland semi-final. The dominant teams of the last few years – Ballyhale Shamrocks, Birr, Portumna and Newtownshandrum – were all eliminated in their respective county club championships. Of all the participating clubs both Kilmallock and De La Salle are the only two teams to have ended up as All-Ireland runners-up in the past without claiming the title.

Oulart-the-Ballagh were installed as favourites to bring the title back to Wexford for the first time since Buffer's Alley success in 1988–89. Thurles Sarsfield's and O'Loughlin Gaels were also regarded as potential All-Ireland champions.

== The championship ==
=== Participating clubs ===
Team	County	Captain	Manager	Most recent success		
Team	County	Captain	Manager	All-Ireland	Provincial	County
Ballyboden St. Enda's	Dublin	Gary Maguire	Liam Hogan			2009
Ballygalget	Down	Eoin Clarke			2005	2008
Clarinbridge	Galway	Paul Callanan	Micheál Donoghue		2001	2001
Coolderry	Offaly	Brendan O'Meara	Ken Hogan			2004
Crusheen	Clare	Gerry O'Grady	Michael Browne			
De La Salle	Waterford	Ian Flynn	Michael Ryan		2008	2008
Keady Lámh Dhearg	Armagh		Philip Harvey			2008
Kilmallock	Limerick	Gavin O'Mahony	Tony Considine		1994	1994
Lavey	Derry	Paul Doherty				2002
Loughgiel Shamrocks	Antrim	Johnny Campbell	P, J. O'Mullan	1983	1989	1989
O'Loughlin Gaels	Kilkenny	Martin Comerford	Michael Nolan		2003	2003
Oulart-the-Ballagh	Wexford	David Redmond	Liam Dunne			2009
Raharney	Westmeath	John Shaw	Johnny Greville			2006
Rathdowney-Errill	Laois	Liam Tynan	Frankie McGrath			2008
Sarsfield's	Cork	Alan Kennedy	John Crowley			2008
Thurles Sarsfield's	Tipperary	Patrick McCormack	Michael Gleeson			2009

=== Format ===
The 2010–11 club championship will be played on a provincial basis as usual. It will be a knockout tournament with pairings drawn at random in the respective provinces – there will be no seeds.

Each match will be played as a single leg. If a match is drawn there will be a replay. If that match ends in a draw a period of extra time will be played, however, if both sides are still level at the end of extra time another replay will take place.

Leinster Championship

Quarter-finals: (2 matches) These are two lone matches between the first four teams drawn from the province of Leinster.

Semi-finals: (2 matches) The winners of the two quarter-finals join the other two Munster teams to make up the semi-final pairings.

Final: (1 match) The winners of the two semi-finals contest this game.

Munster Championship

Quarter-final: (1 match) This is a single match between the first two teams drawn from the province of Munster.

Semi-finals: (2 matches) The winner of the lone quarter-final joins the other three Munster teams to make up the semi-final pairings.

Final: (1 match) The winners of the two semi-finals contest this game.

Ulster Championship

Semi-finals: (2 matches) The four participating Ulster clubs are drawn against each other to make up the semi-final pairings.

Final: (1 match) The winners of the two semi-finals contest this game.

All-Ireland Series

Semi-finals: (2 matches) The four provincial champions contest these games.

Final: (1 match) The two semi-final winners contest the final.

== Fixtures ==
=== Leinster Senior Club Hurling Championship ===
2010-10-31
Quarter-final

Rathdowney-Errill	0–14 – 3–16	O'Loughlin Gaels
J Purcell (0–7), E Holohan (0–4), A Delaney (0–3).	(report)	M Bergin (1–6), B Dowling (1–2), D Geoghan (1–1), M Comerford (0–3), N McEvoy (0–2), P Dowling (0–1), D Loughnane (0–1).

O'Moore Park, Portlaoise
Referee: B. Gavin (Offaly)

2010-10-31
Quarter-final

Raharney	0–17 – 0–14	Coolderry
J Shaw (0–7), B Smyth (0–4), B Connaughton (0–2), C Boyle (0–2), B McKeogh (0–2).	(report)	D Murray (0–6), B Carroll (0–3), K Connolly (0–2), K Brady (0–1), E Ryan (0–1), C Parlon (0–1).

Cusack Park, Mullingar
Referee: J. Owens (Wexford)

2010-11-14
Semi-final

O'Loughlin Gaels	1–21 – 3–11 (AET)	Ballyboden St. Enda's
M. Bergin (0–11, 0–8 frees); B. Dowling (1–2); N. McEvoy, A. Geoghegan, D. Loughnane (0–2 each); P. Dowling, M. Comerford (0–1 each).	(report)	P. Ryan (2–5, 2–4 frees); C. Keaney (1–1); D. Curtin, S. Durking (0–2 each); J. Doody (0–1).

Nowlan Park, Kilkenny
Referee: D. Murphy (Wexford)

2010-11-14
Semi-final

Raharney	4–8 – 4–11	Oulart-the-Ballagh
J. Shaw 2–3 (0–2 frees), P. Greville 2–1, B. Smyth 0–2, B. McKeogh and B. Connaughton 0–1 each.	(report)	N. Kirwan 2–3 (0–2 frees), R. Jacob 0–6, D. Redmond 1–0, D. Mythen 1–0, G. Synnott and S. Murphy 0–1 each.

Cusack Park, Mullingar
Referee: A. Stapleton (Laois)

2011-01-30
Final

Oulart-the-Ballagh	1-8 – 0–14	O'Loughlin Gaels
R. Jacob (1-0), D. Redmond (0-3), G Sinnott (0-2), N. Kirwan (0-2, frees), E. Moore (0-1, free).	(report)	M. Bergin (0-6, five frees), N. McEvoy (0-2), M. Comerford (0-2), S. Cummins (0-2), P. Dowling (0-1), B. Dowling (0-1).

Dr. Cullen Park, Carlow
Referee: T. Carroll (Offaly)

=== Munster Senior Club Hurling Championship ===
2010-10-31
Quarter-final

Crusheen	0–14 – 2–11	Kilmallock
P Vaughan (0–7), G O’Donnell (0–3), J Meaney (0–3), G O’Grady (0–1).	(report)	A O'Shaughnessy (1–3), S O'Donnell (1–0), P O’Dwyer (0–2), G Mulcahy (0–2), J Mulcahy (0–2), E Ryan (0–1), P O’Brien (0–1).

Cusack Park, Ennis
Referee: C. McAllister (Cork)

2010-11-14
Semi-final

Sarsfield's	2–15 – 0–22 (AET)	De La Salle
C. McCarthy (1–6), K. Murphy (1–1), D. Kearney (0-3), G. O’Loughlin (0–3), T. Óg Murphy (0–2).	(report)	B. Phelan (0–6), J. Mullane (0–5), P. Nevin (0–4), K. Moran (0–2), D.Twomey (0-1), E. Barrett (0-1), J. Dillon (0-1), E. Madigan (0-1), S. Daniels (0–1).

Páirc Uí Chaoimh, Cork
Referee: S. Roche (Tipperary)

2010-11-14
Semi-final

Kilmallock	0–11 – 2–10	Thurles Sarsfield's
A. O'Shaughnessy (0–5), G. Mulcahy (0–2), E. Ryan (0–2), P O'Dwyer (0-1), S O'Donnell (0–1).	(report)	M. O'Brien (1–1), P. Bourke (0–4), L. Corbett (1–0) J. Enright (0–2), D. Maher (0-1), P. Maher (0-1), A. McCormack (0–1).

FitzGerald Park, Kilmallock
Referee: M. Wadding (Waterford)

2010-11-28
Final

De La Salle	0–9 – 0–8	Thurles Sarsfields
J Mullane (0-5), J Keane (0-2), B Phelan (0-1), E Madigan (0-1).	(report)	P Bourke (0-3), S Lillis (0-2), A McCormack (0-2), L Corbett (0-1).

Páirc Uí Chaoimh, Cork
Referee: J. Sexton (Cork)

=== Ulster Senior Club Hurling Championship ===
2010-10-10
Semi-final

Keady Lámh Dhearg	1–15 – 2–10	Lavey
C Mone (1–2), P Breen (0–5), P McCormack (0–3), G Enright (0–2), B Breen (0–2), B McNaughton (0–1).	(report)	P Henry (1–6), K O'Neill (1–1), C O'Boyle (0–3).

Casement Park, Belfast
Referee: G. Duffy (Antrim)

2010-10-10
Semi-final

Loughgiel Shamrocks	2–17 – 2–6	Ballygalget
L Watson (1–7), B McCarry (1–2), E McCloskey (0–2), L McKillop (0–2), C McKinley (0–1), Declan Laverty (0–1), O McFaddden (0–1), J Scullion (0–1).	(report)	S Clarke (0–4), G Johnston (1–1), E Clarke (1–0), S Bailie (0–1).

Casement Park, Belfast
Referee: E. Hassan (Derry)

2010-10-24
Final

Loughgiel Shamrocks	2–24 – 0–6	Keady Lámh Dhearg
E McCloskey (0–7), B McCarry (1–3), L Watson (0–6), D Laverty (1–1), J Scullion (0–3), Johnny Campbell (0–2), B McAuley (0–1), M McFadden (0–1).	(report)	P Breen (0–4), G Enright (0–1), B McNaughton (0–1).

Casement Park, Belfast
Referee: D. Magee (Down)

=== All-Ireland Senior Club Hurling Championship ===
2011-02-19
Semi-final

Loughgiel Shamrocks	0–10 – 3-10	O'Loughlin Gaels
L Watson 0-3 (0-2f); E McCloskey 0-2; B McAuley 0-2 (0-1f); J Scullion, B McCarry, A Watt, 0-1 each.	(report)	B Dowling; D Loughnane (1-1) each; A Geoghegan 1-0; M Bergin 0-3 (0-1f); M Nolan 0-2; N McEvoy 0-2 (0-1 sideline); M Comerford 0-1.

Parnell Park, Dublin
Referee: C. McAllister (Cork)

2011-02-19
Semi-final

Clarinbridge	3-22 – 1-27	De La Salle
M Kerins 2-5 (1-4f, 1-0 pen); A Kerins 0-6; E Forde 0-5; E Murphy 1-0; P Coen 0-2; S Forde, S Burke, B Daly, D Forde 0-1 each.	(report)	J Mullane 0-11 (0-6f); E Madigan 1-3; J Dillon, B Phelan (0-2f, 0-1 ‘65) 0-3 each; D Twomey, J Keane 0-2 each; P Nevin, K Moran, L Hayes 0-1 each.

Semple Stadium, Thurles
Referee: J. McGrath (Westmeath)

2011-03-17
Final

Clarinbridge	2-18 – 0–12	O'Loughlin Gaels
M Kerins (1-7), E Forde (1-4), A Kerins (0-2), E Collins (0-2), J Cannon (0-1), E Murphy (0-1), P Coen (0-1).	(report)	M Bergin (0-06), D Loughnane (0-02), A Geoghegan (0-02), M Nolan (0-01), M Comerford (0-01).

Croke Park, Dublin
Referee: J. Ryan (Tipperary)

== Championship statistics ==
=== Scoring ===
- First goal of the championship: 10 October 2010 - Kevin O'Neill for Lavey against Keady Lámh Dhearg (Ulster semi-final)
- Widest winning margin: 24 points
  - Loughgiel Shamrocks 2–24 – 0–6 Keady Lámh Dhearg (Ulster final)
- Most goals in a match: 8 goals
  - Oulart-the-Ballagh 4–11 : 4–8 Raharney (Leinster semi-final)
- Most goals scored in one half by a single team: 4 goals - Raharney against Oulart-the-Ballagh (Leinster semi-final)
- Most goals scored by losing team: 4 goals
  - Raharney 4–8 : 4–11 Oulart-the-Ballagh (Leinster semi-final)

=== Discipline ===
- First red card of the championship: 10 October 2010 - Philip Kirk for Lavey against Keady Lámh Dhearg (Ulster semi-final)

=== Miscellaneous ===
- Crusheen, the county champions of Clare, participated in the championship for the very first time in the history of the competition.
- For the first time ever a club from Armagh – Keady Lámh Dhearg – qualified for the Ulster final. That game turned into the most one-sided decider in the history of the championship as Loughgiel Shamrocks won by twenty-four points.
- Thurles Sarsfields qualified for the Munster final for the very first time in their history.
- The Leinster final between O'Loughlin Gaels and Oulart-the-Ballagh, originally fixed for 28 November, was postponed due to a heavy snowfall and freezing temperatures across the country.
- Referee John Sexton took charge of the Munster final just twenty-four hours after his father Johnny's funeral. The Ballyhea whistler had the sad duty of having to blow the whistle to start and end the minute's silence in memory of his late father before the throw-in.
- A mere 1,613 people attended the Munster final as the country was gripped by a sudden cold spell. It is believed that this is the lowest attendance ever recorded at a Munster decider.

== Top scorers ==
=== Overall ===
	Player	Club	Tally	Total	Games	Average
1	Mark Bergin	O'Loughlin Gaels	1–32	35	5	7.00
2	Mickey Kerins	Clarinbridge	3-12	21	2	10.50
2	John Mullane	De La Salle	0-21	21	3	7.00
3	Liam Watson	Loughgiel Shamrocks	1–16	19	3	6.33
4	John Shaw	Raharney	2–10	16	2	8.00
5	Brian Dowling	O'Loughlin Gaels	3-06	15	5	3.20
6	Eoin Forde	Clarinbridge	1-09	12	2	6.00
7	Paul Ryan	Ballyboden St. Enda's	2-05	11	1	11.00
7	Nicky Kirwan	Oulart-the Ballagh	2-05	11	2	5.50
7	Andrew O'Shaughnessy	Kilmallock	1-08	11	2	5.50
7	Eddie McCloskey	Loughgiel Shamrocks	0-11	11	3	3.66

=== Single game ===
	Player	Club	Tally	Total	Opposition
1	Paul Ryan	Ballyboden St. Enda's	2-5	11	O'Loughlin Gaels
1	Mickey Kerins	Clarinbridge	2-5	11	De La Salle
1	John Mullane	De La Salle	0–11	11	Clarinbridge
1	Mark Bergin	O'Loughlin Gaels	0–11	11	Ballyboden St. Enda's
5	Liam Watson	Loughgiel Shamrocks	1–7	10	Ballygalget
6	Nicky Kirwan	Oulart-the-Ballagh	2–3	9	Raharney
6	John Shaw	Raharney	2–3	9	Oulart-the-Ballagh
6	Paddy Henry	Lavey	1–6	9	Keady Lámh Dhearg
6	Mark Bergin	O'Loughlin Gaels	1–6	9	Rathdowney-Errill
6	Cian McCarthy	Sarsfield's	1–6	9	De La Salle
