= Liam Currams =

Irish Gaelic footballer and hurler

Personal information
- Native name: Liam Ó Corráim (Irish)
- Born: 26 January 1961 (age 65) Kilcormac, County Offaly, Ireland

Sport
- Football Position: Left wing-back
- Hurling Position: Midfield
Club
- Years: Club
- Kilcormac–Killoughey
Inter-county*
| Years | County | Apps (scores) |
| 1980–1986 1980–1985 | Offaly (F); Offaly (H) | 14 (0–1); 8 (0–10) |
Inter-county titles
| | Football | Hurling |
| Leinster Titles | 3 | 2 |
| All-Ireland Titles | 1 | 1 |
| League titles | 0 | 0 |
| All-Stars | 1 | 1 |
- *Inter County team apps and scores correct as of 23:42, 8 August 2012.

Liam Currams (born 26 January 1961) is an Irish former hurler and Gaelic footballer who played as a midfielder and left wing-back for both Offaly senior teams. His inter-county career lasted from 1980 until 1986.

Currams holds a unique place in the annals of Gaelic games in Offaly as a successful dual player at the highest levels. He has won one All-Ireland medal and two Leinster medals in hurling, while has also won one All-Ireland medal and three Leinster medals in football.

Currams has a number of personal achievements.

He is one of only four players to have won All Stars Awards in both hurling and football.

He is the only Offaly player to do so.

At club level Currams played with Kilcormac–Killoughey.

He lives in County Donegal.
