= Ciarán Slevin =

Irish hurler (born 1986)

Personal information
- Native name: Ciarán Ó Sléibhín (Irish)
- Born: 1986 (age 39–40) Kilcormac, County Offaly, Ireland

Sport
- Sport: Hurling
- Position: Centre-forward
Club
- Years: Club
- Kilcormac–Killoughey
Club titles
- Offaly titles: 4
- Leinster titles: 1
Inter-county*
Years	County	Apps (scores)
2007	Offaly	2 (0-00)
Inter-county titles
- Leinster titles: 0
- All-Irelands: 0
- NHL: 0
- All Stars: 0
- *Inter County team apps and scores correct as of 15:59, 9 December 2012.

Ciarán Slevin (born 1986) is an Irish hurler who played as a centre-forward for the Offaly senior team.

Slevin has played for Offaly at levels, beginning as a member of the county minor and under-21 hurling teams. He joined the senior team during the 2007 National League and was included on the panel for the subsequent championship. He enjoyed little success during his one season on the senior team.

At club level Slevin is a one-time Leinster medalist with Kilcormac–Killoughey In addition to this he has also won one county club championship medal.

== Playing career ==
=== Club ===
Slevin plays his club hurling with Kilcormac–Killoughey and has enjoyed some success.

After losing two county senior championship finals to Birr and Tullamore in the space of three years, Kilcormac-Killoughey lined out in a third championship decider in 2012. A 2–16 to 2–12 defeat of St. Rynagh's, with Slevin hitting 1–9, gave him an Offaly Senior Hurling Championship medal. He later added a Leinster medal to his collection following a 1–12 to 0–11 defeat of Oulart the Ballagh in the provincial decider.

=== Inter-county ===
Slevin first came to prominence on the inter-county scene as a member of the Offaly minor hurling team in 2004. He enjoyed little success in this grade before joining the Offaly under-21 team in 2005. Once gain success eluded him in this grade.

Slevin joined the Offaly senior hurling team in 2007. He made his championship debut as a substitute in a Leinster quarter-final defeat of Laois that year. Slevin later came on as a substitute in an All-Ireland qualifier defeat of Dublin.

== Career statistics ==
=== Club ===
As of match played 3 December 2017.

Team	Year	Leinster		All-Ireland		Total	
Team	Year	Apps	Score	Apps	Score	Apps	Score
Kilcormac–Killoughey	2012-13	3	1-20	2	0-19	5	1-39
Kilcormac–Killoughey	2013-14	2	1-14	0	0-00	2	1-14
Kilcormac–Killoughey	2014-15	3	0-21	0	0-00	3	0-21
Kilcormac–Killoughey	2017-18	3	0-17	0	0-00	3	0-17
Total		11	2-72	2	0-19	13	2-91

== Honours ==
=== Team ===
Kilcormac–Killoughey

- Leinster Senior Club Hurling Championship (1): 2012 (c)
- Offaly Senior Club Hurling Championship (1): 2012 (c)
