= Brosna Gaels GAA =

Gaelic games club in County Offaly, Ireland

Brosna Gaels
- Gaeil na Brosnaí
- Founded: 2002
- County: Offaly
- Colours: Blue, white and gold

Playing kits
Standard colours

Senior Club Championships
	All Ireland	Leinster champions	Offaly champions
Hurling:	0	0	0

Brosna Gaels GAA is a Gaelic Athletic Association club located in the parish of Leamonaghan, which includes Ballycumber, Doon and Pullough, in County Offaly, Ireland. The club is exclusively concerned with the game of hurling.

== Honours ==
- Offaly Intermediate Hurling Championship (2): 2009, 2011
- Offaly Junior A Hurling Championship (1): 2007, 2021
- Offaly Junior B Hurling Championship (2): 2005, 2010

== See also ==
- River Brosna, County Offaly
- Little Brosna River, County Offaly
