= 2014 Offaly Senior Hurling Championship =

Annual hurling competition season

- Dates: 2 May 2014 – 19 October 2014
- Teams: 12
- Champions: Kilcormac–Killoughey
- Runners-up: St Rynagh's
- Relegated: Drumcullen

The 2014 Offaly Senior Hurling Championship was the 117th staging of the Offaly Senior Hurling Championship since its establishment by the Offaly County Board in 1896. The championship began on 2 May 2014 and ended on 19 October 2014.

Kilcormac–Killoughey were the defending champions, and successfully retained the title following a 2–18 to 1–9 defeat of St Rynagh's. Drumcullen were relegated from the championship after four years in the top flight.

== Teams ==
All but one of the twelve teams from the 2013 championship participated in the top tier of Offaly hurling in 2014.

Ballinamere, who defeated Kilcormac–Killoughey by 2–19 to 1–14 in the final of the intermediate championship in 2013, availed of their right to automatic promotion to the senior championship.

Similarly, Drumcullen defeated Lusmagh by 0–16 to 0–13 in the 2013 senior relegation play-off, and so Lusmagh were relegated to the intermediate grade for 2014.

== Fixtures/results ==
=== Group 1 ===
Pos	Team	Pld	W	D	L	For	Ag.	Diff.	Pts.
1	St Rynagh's	5	4	1	0	113	72	41	9
2	Shinone	5	3	2	0	104	84	20	8
3	Birr	5	2	0	3	78	75	3	4
4	Ballinamere	5	2	0	3	79	117	-38	4
5	Tullamore	5	1	1	3	72	76	-4	3
6	Kinnitty	5	1	0	4	87	109	-22	2

=== Group 2 ===
Pos	Team	Pld	W	D	L	For	Ag.	Diff.	Pts.
1	Kilcormac–Killoughey	5	5	0	0	136	80	56	10
2	Seir Kieran	5	3	1	1	130	92	38	7
3	Coolderry	5	3	0	2	115	85	30	6
4	Belmont	5	2	1	2	114	122	-8	5
5	Drumcullen	5	1	0	4	72	148	-76	2
6	Brosna Gaels	5	0	0	5	75	115	-40	0

=== Relegation play-offs ===
14 September 2014 Semi-final	Drumcullen	0-12 - 0-17	Kinnitty	Clareen
11:30

14 September 2014 Semi-final	Brosna Gaels	0-13 - 0-25	Tullamore	Kilcormac
11:30

5 October 2014 Final	Drumcullen	0-17 - 0-21	Brosna Gaels	Ferbane GAA Grounds
11:30

=== Quarter-finals ===
13 September 2014 Quarter-final	Kilcormac–Killoughey	3-21 - 2-14	Ballinamere	O'Connor Park
16:00

13 September 2014 Quarter-final	St Rynagh's	0-19 - 1-8	Belmont	O'Connor Park
17:30

14 September 2014 Quarter-final	Shinrone	1-11 - 2-20	Coolderry	St Brendan's Park
15:00

14 September 2014 Quarter-final	Seir Kieran	3-17 - 0-15	Birr	St Brendan's Park
16:30

=== Semi-finals ===
5 October 2014 Semi-final	Seir Kieran	2-7 - 1-17	St Rynagh's	O'Connor Park
14:30				Referee: B Gavin

5 October 2014 Semi-final	Kilcormac–Killoughey	0-15 - 1-10	Coolderry	O'Connor Park
16:00				Referee: T Carroll

=== Final ===
19 October 2014 Final	St Rynagh's	1-9 - 2-18	Kilcormac–Killoughey	O'Connor Park
15:30	J O'Connor (1-1), S Quirke (0-4, 3f), S Wynne (0-2, 1f), P Quirke (0-1), G Kelly (0-1).	Report	Ciaran Slevin (0-8, 6f), D Currams (1-4), Conor Mahon (1-2), P Geraghty (0-2, 1sl), J Gorman (0-2).	Referee: B Gavin

== Championship statistics ==
=== Miscellaneous ===
- In the quarter-finals, Seir Kieran recorded their first championship victory over Birr in nineteen years.
- Kilcormac–Killoughey won a third successive championship.
