= 2012 Offaly Senior Hurling Championship =

Annual hurling competition season

The 2012 Offaly Senior Hurling Championship was the 115th staging of the Offaly Senior Hurling Championship since its establishment by the Offaly County Board in 1896. The draw for the 2012 fixtures took place on 28 January 2012. The championship began on 11 May 2012 and ended on 7 October 2012.

Coolderry, the defending champions, were defeated in the quarter-final stages by St Rynagh's. Shamrocks were relegated from the championship. Kilcormac–Killoughey won the title following a 2–16 to 2–12 defeat of St Rynagh's in the final.

== Teams ==
All but one of the twelve teams from the 2011 championship participated in the top tier of Offaly hurling in 2012.

Brosna Gaels, who defeated St Rynagh's by 0–13 to 0–8 in the final of the intermediate championship in 2011, availed of their right to automatic promotion to the senior championship.

Similarly, Lusmagh were defeated in the 2011 senior relegation play-off and were relegated to the intermediate grade for 2012.

The twelve teams were divided into two groups:

Group 1: Coolderry, Kilcormac–Killoughey, Seir Kieran, Kinnitty, Brosna Gaels, Shamrocks

Group 2: Birr, St Rynagh's, Tullamore, Drumcullen, Shinrone, Belmont

== Results ==
=== Relegation play-off ===
13 October 2012 Relegation play-off	Drumcullen	0-14 - 0-11	Shamrocks

=== Quarter-finals ===
1 September 2012 Quarter-final	Kilcormac–Killoughey	3-20 - 0-11	Belmont	O'Connor Park

1 September 2012 Quarter-final	Birr	2-9 - 0-12	Brosna Gaels	O'Connor Park

2 September 2012 Quarter-final	Shinrone	0-15 - 1-7	Seir Kieran	O'Connor Park

2 September 2012 Quarter-final	St Rynagh's	0-15 - 1-7	Coolderry	O'Connor Park

=== Semi-finals ===
16 September 2012 Semi-final	Birr	0-13 - 1-11	Kilcormac–Killoughey	O'Connor Park
14:30				Referee: N Cooney

16 September 2012 Semi-final	St Rynagh's	3-12 - 0-15	Shinrone	O'Connor Park
16:00				Referee: B Gavin

=== Final ===
7 October 2012 Final	Kilcormac–Killoughey	2-16 - 2-12	St Rynagh's	O'Connor Park
	Ciaran Slevin 1-9 (1-0 penalty, 0-7 frees), K Grogan 1-0, T Fletcher 0-2 (0-1 free), P Geraghty, D Currams, J Gorman, C Mahon, M Leonard 0-1 each.	Report	D Horan 1-0, G Kelly 1-0, C Flannery 0-3, S Wynne 0-3 (0-1 ’65 & 0-2 frees), G Scales 0-2 (frees), S Dolan 0-2, S Quirke, P Camon 0-1 each.	Referee: T Carroll (Kinnitty)
