= 2012–13 All-Ireland Senior Club Hurling Championship =

All-Ireland Senior Club Hurling Championship 2012–13
Championship Details
- Dates: 14 October 2012 – 17 March 2013
- Teams: 16

All Ireland Champions
- Winners: St. Thomas's (1st win)
- Captain: Robert Murray
- Manager: John Burke

All Ireland Runners-up
- Runners-up: Kilcormac–Killoughey
- Captain: Ciarán Slevin
- Manager: Danny Ownes

Provincial Champions
- Munster: Thurles Sarsfields
- Leinster: Kilcormac–Killoughey
- Ulster: Loughgiel Shamrocks
- Connacht: Not Played

Championship Statistics
- Matches Played: 17
- Total Goals: 30 (1.76 per game)
- Total Points: 481 (28.29 per game)
- Top Scorer: Ciarán Slevin (1–39)

The 2012–13 All-Ireland Senior Club Hurling Championship was the 43rd staging of the All-Ireland championship since its establishment by the Gaelic Athletic Association in 1970. The draw for the 2012–13 fixtures took place in August 2012. The championship began on 14 October 2012 and ended on 17 March 2013. Loughgiel Shamrocks were the defending champions.

St. Thomas's secured the title with a 1–11 to 1–9 defeat of Kilcormac–Killoughey in the All-Ireland final.

== Teams ==
A total of sixteen teams contested the championship, including all of the representative teams from the 2011–12. The Armagh champions and the Carlow champions joined these teams in 2012–13.

The 2012–13 championship also saw a number of first-time participants. Kilcormac–Killoughey of Offaly, Swatragh of Derry and St. Thomas's of Galway won their first county championship titles and represented their respective counties in their respective provincial championships.

== Team summaries ==
=== Participating clubs ===
Team	County	Captain	Manager	Most recent success		
Team	County	Captain	Manager	All-Ireland	Provincial	County
Ballyhale Shamrocks	Kilkenny	David Hoyne	Tommy Shefflin	2010	2009	2009
Clonkill	Westmeath	Eoin Price				2011
De La Salle	Waterford	Kevin Moran	Derek McGrath		2010	2010
Kilcormac–Killoughey	Offaly	Ciarán Slevin	Danny Owens			
Kilmacud Crokes	Dublin	Ross O'Carroll	Gearóid Ó Riain			1985
Kilmallock	Limerick	Paudie O'Brien	Tony Considine		1994	2010
Loughgiel Shamrocks	Antrim	Johnny Campbell	P. J. O'Mullan	2012	2011	2011
Middletown	Armagh	Ryan Gaffney	Sylvester McConnell			2011
Mount Leinster Rangers	Carlow	Brian Nolan	Tom Mullally			2011
Newmarket-on-Fergus	Clare	Enda Barrett	Bob Enright		1968	1981
Oulart the Ballagh	Wexford	Keith Rossiter	Pat Herbert			2011
Portaferry	Down	Ciarán Coulter				2006
Rathdowney-Errill	Laois	Shane Dollard	Frank McGrath			2010
Sarsfield's	Cork	Joe Barry	Pat Ryan			2010
St. Thomas's	Galway	Robert Murray	John Burke			
Swatragh	Derry	Michael Kirkpatrick	Seán McGuckin			
Thurles Sarsfield's	Tipperary	Pádraic Maher	Séamus Quinn			2010

== Fixtures ==
=== Leinster Senior Club Hurling Championship ===
4 November 2012
Quarter-final

Kilmacud Crokes	1–12 – 1–13	Oulart the Ballagh
S McGrath 1–7 (5f); J Burke 0–2; D Kelly 0–2; Ross O’Carroll 0–1.	Report	N Kirwan 1–3 (1-0p, 2f); C O’Leary 0–4 (2f, 1 65); R Jacob 0–2; D Redmond, G Sinnott, P Roche, D Nolan, 0–1 each.

Parnell Park, Dublin
Referee: T Carroll (Offaly).

4 November 2012
Quarter-final

Mount Leinster Rangers	0–9 – 1–11	Kilcormac–Killoughey
D Murphy 0-5f, E Doyle 0–2, E Coady, R Kelly 0–1 each.	Report	C Slevin 1–10, 0-7f, 0–1 ’65, J Gorman 0–1.

Dr. Cullen Park, Carlow
Referee: S Cleere (Kilkenny).

4 November 2012
Quarter-final

Rathdowney-Errill	1–12 – 0–12	Clonkill
R King 0–8 (6f), J Purcell 1–1, E Meagher 0–2, J Corrigan 0–1.	Report	B Murtagh 0–5 (4f), A Mitchell 0–3 (f), E Price 0–2, M Keegan, S Power 0–1 each .

O'Moore Park, Portlaoise
Referee: D Hughes (Carlow)

18 November 2012
Semi-final

Kilcormac–Killoughey	2–12 0–14	Rathdowney-Errill
C Slevin 0–7 (5f, 1 65), D Currams, P Geraghty 1–1 each, K Leonard, C Mahon, J Gorman 0–1 each.	Report	R King 0–8 (4f), J Purcell, L Tynan 0–2 each, J Phelan, D King 0–1 each.

O'Connor Park, Tullamore
Referee: J Owens (Wexford)

1 December 2012
Semi-final

Oulart the Ballagh	1–11 – 1–10	Ballyhale Shamrocks
G Sinnott 1–0; R Jacob, D Nolan, D Redmond 0–2 each; N. Kirwan 0–2 (1f, 1 '65); E Moore, C O'Leary, F Cullen 0–1 each.	Report	J Fitzpatrick 0–6 (1f), C Fennelly 1–1, E Reid 0–2, H Shefflin 0-1f.

Wexford Park, Wexford
Referee: B Kelly (Westmeath)

9 December 2012
Final

Kilcormac–Killoughey	1–12 – 0–11	Oulart the Ballagh
D Currams 1–2, J Gorman, Ciaran Slevin (3f) 0–3 each, P Geraghty 0–2, D Kilmartin, B Leonard 0–1 each.	Report	N Kirwan 0–6 (6f), R Jacob 0–2, C O'Leary, D Nolan, D Redmond 0–1 each.

Nowlan Park, Kilkenny
Referee: S Cleere (Kilkenny)

=== Munster Senior Club Hurling Championship ===
28 October 2012
Quarter-final

Kilmallock	0–15 – 2–12	Thurles Sarsfield's
E Ryan 0–6 (4f), P O’Brien & S O’Donnell 0–3 each, R Egan, P O’Dwyer & K O’Donnell 0–1 each.	Report	P Bourke 1–5 (1-3f), L Corbett 1–2, J Enright 0-3f, D Maher & M O’Brien 0–1 each.

FitzGerald Park, Kilmallock
Referee: C Lyons (Cork)

11 November 2012
Semi-final

Thurles Sarsfield's	2–20 – 2–15	Sarsfield's
P Bourke 0–7 (2fs), A McCormack 0–5, L Corbett 1–1, J Enright 0–4 (3fs), R Ruth 1–0, G O’Grady, M Gleeson, M O’Brien, 0–1 each.	Report	C McCarthy 0–8 (6fs, 1 65), E Quigley 2–1, G O’Loughlin, R Murphy 0–2 each, D Roche, T Óg Murphy 0–1 each.

Semple Stadium, Thurles
Referee: M Wadding (Waterford)

11 November 2012
Semi-final

Newmarket-on-Fergus	0–10 – 1–10	De La Salle
C. Ryan 0–4 (0–2 fs, 0–1 65); S. O’Brien sr, M. McInerney 0–2; S. O’Brien jr, D. Barrett 0–1.	Report	J. Keane 1–2; B. Phelan (fs), J. Mullane, D. Twomey 0–2 each; P. Nevin and J. Dillon (f) 0–1.

O'Garney Park, Sixmilebridge
Referee: J Ryan (Tipperary)

25 November 2012
Final

Thurles Sarsfield's	1–21 – 1–16	De La Salle
P Bourke 0–7 (2fs), L Corbett 0–3, J Corbett 1–0, M Gleeson, D Maher, G O’Grady 0–2 each, M Cahill, J Enright, M O’Brien, A McCormack, R Reid, 0–1 each.	Report	J Dillon 0–9 (5fs, 1 sideline), E Barrett 0–3, P Nevin 1–0, D Twomey, J Mullane, E Madigan, K Moran 0–1 each.

Páirc Uí Chaoimh, Cork
Referee: S Hourigan (Limerick)

=== Ulster Senior Club Hurling Championship ===
14 October 2012
Semi-final

Portaferry	0–23 – 1–6	Swatragh
P Braniff 0–11 (8f), C Mageean 0–3, S Murray, J Convery, E Sands, 0–2 each, C O'Prey (f), Brendan Coleman (f), A O'Prey 0–1 each.	Report	R Convery 1–2 (1f), C Convery 0-2f, M Kirkpatrick, C McQuillan 0–1 each.

Casement Park, Belfast
Referee: O Elliot (Antrim)

14 October 2012
Semi-final

Middletown	0–12 – 1–25	Loughgiel Shamrocks
R Gaffney (0-5f), K McKernan (0–3, 0–1 ‘65’), E Carvill (0–2), M Maguire (0–1), C McCann (0–1).	Report	E McCloskey (1–6), L Watson (0–8, 4f), B McCarry (0–6), M McFadden (0–2), D Laverty (0–2), S Casey (0–1).

Casement Park, Belfast
Referee: E Hasson (Derry)

28 October 2012
Final

Portaferry	0–12 – 2–25	Loughgiel Shamrocks
P Braniff 0–7 (6f), E Sands, J Convery, C Coulter, N Kelly, A Savage 0–1 each.	Report	E McCloskey 0–8, L Watson 1–5 (3f), J Scullion 0–5, S Casey 1–1, B McCarry 0–3, D Laverty 0–2, B McAuley 0–1.

Casement Park, Belfast
Referee: E Hasson (Derry)

=== All-Ireland Senior Club Hurling Championship ===
9 February 2013
Semi-final

Thurles Sarsfield's	1–14 – 1–20	Kilcormac–Killoughey
P Bourke (1-05, 0–03 frees, 0-01 ‘65), J Enright (0-02, ‘65s), D Maher (0-02), M Gleeson (0-01), A McCormack (0-01), Richie Ruth (0-01), R Maher (0-01), M O’Brien (0-01).	Report	C Slevin (0–11, 0-08frees 0-01 ‘65), D Currams,(1-01), C Mahon (0-02), B Leonard (0-02, frees), K Leonard (0-01), P Geraghty (0-01); J Gorman (0-01), T Geraghty (0-01).

O'Moore Park, Portlaoise
Referee: C Lyons (Cork)

9 February 2013
Semi-final

St. Thomas's	1–25 – 3–19 (AET)	Loughgiel Shamrocks
C Cooney (0–12, 2fs, 2 sideline, 1 ’65), G Murray (1–1), B Burke (0–4), K Burke (0–3), J Regan (0–3), David Burke (0–1), Richard Murray (0–1).	Report	L Watson (1–7, all frees), B McCarry (1–2), S Casey (1–1), J Scullion (0–4), E McCloskey (0–3), T McCloskey (0–1), S Dobbin (0–1).

Parnell Park, Dublin
Referee: B Kelly (Westmeath)

16 February 2013
Semi-final replay

St. Thomas's	0–15 – 0–7	Loughgiel Shamrocks
C Cooney 0–6 (0-3fs, 0–1 ‘65), B Burke (0–4), K Burke (0–1), J Regan (0–1), E Burke (0–1), R Murray (0–1), D Burke (0–1).	Report	L Watson 0–6 (0-6f), E McCloskey 0–1.

St. Tiernach's Park, Clones
Referee: J Owens (Wexford)

17 March 2013
Final

St. Thomas's	1–11 – 1–9	Kilcormac–Killoughey
C Cooney 0–5 (3f), Richard Murray 1-02, J Regan, A Kelly, B Burke, K Burke 0–1 each.	Report	Ciaran Slevin 0–8 (7f, 0–1 sideline), T Fletcher 1–1.

Croke Park, Dublin
Referee: J Sexton (Cork)

== Championship statistics ==
=== Scoring ===
- First goal of the championship: Ruairí Convery for Swatragh against Portaferry (Ulster semi-final, 14 October 2012)

=== Discipline ===
- First red card of the championship: Ruairí Convery for Swatragh against Portaferry, 43 minutes (14 October 2012)

=== Miscellaneous ===
- Thurles Sarsfield's win the Munster title for the first time in their history.
- The Leinster semi-final between Oulart-The Ballagh and Ballyhale Shamrocks was postponed due to torrential rain. Referee Barry Kelly took the decision for player safety.
- Kilcormac–Killoughey win the Leinster title for the first time in their history while Oulart-The Ballagh lose their third successive provincial decider.

== Top scorers ==
Top scorers overall

Rank	Player	Club	Tally	Total	Games	Average
1	Ciarán Slevin	Kilcormac–Killoughey	1–39	42	5	8.4
2	Liam Watson	Loughgiel Shamrocks	2–26	32	4	8.00
3	Pa Bourke	Thurles Sarsfield's	2–24	30	4	7.50
4	Conor Cooney	St. Thomas's	0–23	23	3	7.66
	Eddie McCloskey	Loughgiel Shamrocks	1–18	21	4	5.25
6	Paul Braniff	Portaferry	0–18	18	2	9.0
7	Ross King	Rathdowney-Errill	0–16	16	2	8.0
8	Benny McCarry	Loughgiel Shamrocks	1–11	14	3	4.66
8	Nicky Kirwan	Oulart-the Ballagh	1–11	14	3	4.66
9	Dan Currams	Rathdowney-Errill	3-04	13	4	3.25

Top scorers in a single game

Rank	Player	Club	Tally	Total	Opposition
1	Ciarán Slevin	Kilcormac–Killoughey	1–10	13	Mount Leinster Rangers
2	Conor Cooney	St. Thomas's	0–12	12	Loughgiel Shamrocks
3	Paul Braniff	Portaferry	0–11	11	Swatragh
3	Ciarán Slevin	Kilcormac–Killoughey	0–11	11	Thurles Sarsfield's
4	Seán McGrath	Kilmacud Crokes	1-07	10	Oulart the Ballagh
4	Liam Watson	Loughgiel Shamrocks	1-07	10	St. Thomas's
5	Eddie McCloskey	Loughgiel Shamrocks	1-06	9	Middletown
5	Jake Dillon	De La Salle	0-09	9	Thurles Sarsfield's
6	Pa Bourke	Thurles Sarsfield's	1-05	8	Kilmallock
6	Pa Bourke	Thurles Sarsfield's	1-05	8	Kilcormac–Killoughey
6	Liam Watson	Loughgiel Shamrocks	1-05	8	Portaferry
6	Liam Watson	Loughgiel Shamrocks	0-08	8	Middletown
6	Eddie McCloskey	Loughgiel Shamrocks	0-08	8	Portaferry
6	Ross King	Rathdowney-Errill	0-08	8	Clonkill
6	Cian McCarthy	Sarsfield's	0-08	8	Thurles Sarsfield's
6	Ross King	Rathdowney-Errill	0-08	8	Kilcormac–Killoughey
6	Ciarán Slevin	Kilcormac–Killoughey	0-08	8	St. Thomas's
