= 2013 Offaly Senior Hurling Championship =

Annual hurling competition season

- Dates: 10 May 2013 – 6 October 2013
- Teams: 12
- Champions: Kilcormac–Killoughey
- Runners-up: Birr
- Relegated: Lusmagh

The 2013 Offaly Senior Hurling Championship was the 116th staging of the Offaly Senior Hurling Championship since its establishment in 1896. The championship began on 10 May 2013 and ended on 6 October 2013.

Kilcormac–Killoughey were the reigning champions, and they successfully defended their title following a 1–21 to 1–14 defeat of Birr.

== Teams ==
=== Overview ===
All but one of the twelve teams from the 2012 championship participated in the top tier of Offaly hurling in 2013.

Lusmagh, who defeated St Rynagh's by 4–11 to 2–14 in the final of the intermediate championship in 2012, availed of their right to automatic promotion to the senior championship.

Similarly, Drumc defeated Shamrocks in the 2012 relegation play-off, and so Shamrocks were relegated to the intermediate grade for 2013.

== Results ==
=== Group 1 ===
Pos	Team	Pld	W	D	L	SF	SA	Diff	Pts	Notes
1	Kilcomrac–Killoughey	5	5	0	0	132	66	66	10	
2	Birr	5	4	0	1	97	72	25	8	
3	Seir Kieran	5	3	0	2	106	85	21	6	
4	Tullamore	5	2	0	3	74	104	-30	4	
5	Brosna Gaels	5	1	0	4	77	107	-30	2	
6	Drumcullen	5	0	0	5	63	115	-52	0	

10 May Round 1	Kilcormac–Killoughey	0-19 - 0-12	Birr	Banagher
19:30				Referee: B Gavin

11 May Round 1	Tullamore	0-14 - 1-8	Drumcullen	St Brendan's Park
17:00				Referee: T Carroll

11 May Round 1	Seir Kieran	1-19 - 0-7	Brosna Gaels	St Brendan's Park
18:30				Referee: D Cooke

12 July Round 2	Brosna Gaels	2-10 - 3-15	Tullamore	Clara
19:30				Referee: T Carroll

12 July Round 2	Birr	3-13 - 1-11	Seir Kieran	Shinrone
19:30				Referee: D Cooke

14 July Round 2	Drumcullen	0-12 - 5-14	Kilcormac–Killoughey	St Brendan's Park
18:00				Referee: C Groome

26 July Round 3	Brosna Gaels	2-16 - 0-13	Drumcullen	Drumcullen
20:00				Referee: N Flynn

28 July Round 3	Birr	0-18 - 0-9	Tullamore	Banagher
12:00				Referee: D Cooke

28 July Round 3	Seir Kieran	0-12 - 3-21	Kilcormac–Killoughey	St Brendan's Park
19:30				Referee: N Cooney

10 August Round 4	Tullamore	1-9 - 5-17	Seir Kieran	O'Connor Park
17:30

10 August Round 4	Kilcormac–Killoughey	2-21 - 2-9	Brosna Gaels	Lusmagh
19:00				Referee: T Carroll

17 August Round 4	Drumcullen	0-13 - 2-18	Birr	Kinnitty
17:00				Referee: N Cooney

25 August Round 5	Kilcormac–Killoughey	3-18 - 2-9	Tullamore	Kilcormac
18:30				Referee: D Cooke

25 August Round 5	Seir Kieran	4-14 - 1-11	Drumcullen	Kinnitty
18:30				Referee: T Carroll

25 August Round 5	Birr	0-21 - 1-14	Brosna Gaels	Moystown
18:30				Referee: C Groome

=== Group 2 ===
Pos	Team	Pld	W	D	L	SF	SA	Diff	Pts	Notes
1	St Rynagh's	5	4	0	1	81	77	4	8	
2	Coolderry	5	4	0	1	115	72	43	8	
3	Shinrone	5	3	0	2	106	89	17	6	
4	Belmont	5	2	1	2	94	101	-7	5	
5	Kinnitty	5	1	0	4	79	89	-10	2	
6	Lusmagh	5	0	1	4	67	114	-47	1	

12 May Round 1	Coolderry	1-21 - 2-8	Belmont	St Brendan's Park
14:00				Referee: M Walsh

12 May Round 1	St Rynagh's	1-12 - 1-8	Shinrone	St Brendan's Park
15:30				Referee: N Flynn

12 May Round 1	Kinnitty	0-17 - 0-11	Lusmagh	Rath
19:00				Referee: D Cooke

14 July Round 2	Belmont	4-12 - 2-14	Kinnitty	Banagher
12:00				Referee: M Walsh

14 July Round 2	Lusmagh	0-15 - 1-15	St Rynagh's	Moystown
18:00				Referee: N Flynn

14 July Round 2	Shinrone	0-14 - 2-19	Coolderry	St Brendan's Park
19:30				Referee: D Cooke

26 July Round 3	Belmont	1-14 - 2-11	Lusmagh	Banagher
20:00				Referee: P Kirwan

26 July Round 3	Shinrone	1-16 - 2-8	Kinnitty	St Brendan's Park
20:00				Referee: D Cooke

28 July Round 3	Coolderry	1-16 - 2-14	St Rynagh's	St Brendan's Park
18:00				Referee: T Carroll

10 August Round 4	St Rynagh's	0-12 - 0-20	Belmont	O'Connor Park
19:00				Referee: C Groome

11 August Round 4	Lusmagh	0-16 - 5-19	Shinrone	Carraig
12:00				Referee: M Walsh

11 August Round 4	Kinnitty	1-13 - 0-19	Coolderry	Clareen
18:00				Referee: G Connors

24 August Round 5	St Rynagh's	1-13 - 0-12	Kinnitty	Rath
18:45				Referee: M Walsh

24 August Round 5	Coolderry	2-22 - 0-8	Lusmagh	Clareen
18:45				Referee: G Connors

24 August Round 5	Shinrone	3-19 - 3-10	Belmont	St Brendan's Park
18:45

=== Relegation play-offs ===
7 September Semi-final	Kinnitty	1-24 - 1-10	Drumcullen	St Brendan's Park
17:30				Referee: D Cooke

14 September Semi-final	Brosna Gaels	2-14 - 2-13	Lusmagh	St Brendan's Park
17:00				Referee: M Walsh

21 September Final	Drumcullen	0-16 - 0-13	Lusmagh	St Brendan's Park
16:30				Referee: M Walsh

=== Quarter-finals ===
31 August Quarter-final	Seir Kieran	1-17 - 1-16	Coolderry	St Brendan's Park
17:00				Referee: D Cooke

31 August Quarter-final	Birr	1-17 - 0-14	Shinrone	St Brendan's Park
18:30				Referee: B Gavin

1 September Quarter-final	St Rynagh's	2-14 - 2-10	Tullamore	O'Connor Park
17:00				Referee: T Carroll

1 September Quarter-final	Kilcormac–Killoughey	1-24 - 2-13	Belmont	O'Connor Park
18:30

=== Semi-finals ===
15 September Semi-final	Birr	0-16 - 1-7	St Rynagh's	O'Connor Park
14:00				Referee: T Carroll

15 September Semi-final	Kilcormac–Killoughey	1-19 - 2-10	Seir Kieran	O'Connor Park
15:30	Ciarán Slevin (0-10, 8fs, 1 65), D Currams (1-1), Conor Mahon, T Geraghty, D Kilmartin (0-2 each), J Gorman, P Geraghty (0-1 each).	Report	J Bergin (1-8, 1-1 pen, 0-5f), S Ryan (1-0), A Hynes & S Hynes (0-1 each).	Referee: B Gavin

=== Final ===
6 October Final	Kilcormac–Killoughey	1-21 - 1-14	Birr	O'Connor Park
15:30	Ciarán Slevin 0-11 (0-9f, 0-1 ‘65), D Currams 1-1, Conor Mahon, T Geraghty & P Geraghty (0-1 sideline) 0-2 each, B Leonard (sideline), T Fletcher & J Gorman 0-1 each.	Report	S Whelehan 1-2 (0-2f), D Hayden & P Mullins 0-4 each, M Dwane & P Cleary 0-2f each.	Referee: T Carroll (Kinnitty)
