= 1955 Offaly Senior Hurling Championship =

Annual hurling competition season

- Champions: Tullamore (7th title)
- Runners-up: Drumcullen

The 1955 Offaly Senior Hurling Championship was the 58th staging of the Offaly Senior Hurling Championship since its establishment by the Offaly County Board in 1896.

Drumcullen entered the championship as the defending champions.

The final was played on 18 September 1955 at St Brendan's Park in Birr, between Tullamore and Drumcullen, in what was their third meeting in the final. Tullamore won the match by 4–10 to 3–10 to claim their seventh championship title overall and a first championship title in 18 years.

== Results ==
=== Final ===
| 18 September 1955 Final | Tullamore | 4-10 - 3-10 | Drumcullen | St Brendan's Park |
