= 1945 Offaly Senior Hurling Championship =

Annual hurling competition season

- Champions: Coolderry (16th title); J. Dooley (captain)
- Runners-up: Tullamore; T. Flynn (captain)

The 1945 Offaly Senior Hurling Championship was the 48th staging of the Offaly Senior Hurling Championship since its establishment by the Offaly County Board in 1896.

Birr entered the championship as the defending champions.

The final was played on 9 September 1945 at St Brendan's Park in Birr, between Coolderry and Tullamore, in what was their sixth meeting in the final overall. Coolderry won the match by 4–05 to 2–03 to claim their 16th championship title overall and a first championship title in three years.

== Results ==
=== Final ===
9 September 1945 Final	Coolderry	4-05 - 2-03	Tullamore	St Brendan's Park
