= 1958 Offaly Senior Hurling Championship =

Annual hurling competition season

- Champions: Drumcullen (16th title)
- Runners-up: Coolderry

The 1958 Offaly Senior Hurling Championship was the 61st staging of the Offaly Senior Hurling Championship since its establishment by the Offaly County Board in 1896.

Drumcullen entered the championship as the defending champions.

The final was played on 19 October 1958 at St Brendan's Park in Birr, between Drumcullen and Coolderry, in what was their first meeting in the final in two years. Drumcullen won the match by 3–05 to 1–04 to claim their 16th championship title overall and a second championship title in succession.

== Results ==
=== Final ===
19 October 1958 Final	Drumcullen	3-05 - 1-04	Coolderry	St Brendan's Park
