= 1943 Offaly Senior Hurling Championship =

Annual hurling competition season

- Champions: Birr (11th title); P. King (captain)
- Runners-up: Tullamore; B. Caulfield (captain)

The 1943 Offaly Senior Hurling Championship was the 46th staging of the Offaly Senior Hurling Championship since its establishment by the Offaly County Board in 1896.

Coolderry entered the championship as the defending champions.

The final, a replay, was played on 28 November 1943 at St Brendan's Park in Birr, between Birr and Tullamore, in what was their first ever meeting in the final. Birr won the match by 2–08 to 2–04 to claim their 11th championship title overall and a first championship title in three years.

== Results ==
=== Final ===
24 October 1943 Final	Birr	4-02 - 3-05	Tullamore	O'Connor Park

=== Final replay ===
28 November 1943 Final replay	Birr	2-08 - 2-04	Tullamore	St Brendan's Park
