= 1934 Offaly Senior Hurling Championship =

Annual hurling competition season

- Champions: Tullamore (3rd title)

The 1934 Offaly Senior Hurling Championship was the 37th staging of the Offaly Senior Hurling Championship since its establishment by the Offaly County Board in 1896.

Drumcullen entered the championship as the defending champions.

The final was not played due to a dispute between Drumcullen and Coolderry at the semi-final stage. Tullamore, who had already qualified for the final, were declared the champions.
