= 1957 Offaly Senior Hurling Championship =

Annual hurling competition season

- Champions: Drumcullen (15th title)
- Runners-up: Shannon Rovers

The 1957 Offaly Senior Hurling Championship was the 60th staging of the Offaly Senior Hurling Championship since its establishment by the Offaly County Board in 1896.

Coolderry entered the championship as the defending champions.

The final was played on 29 September 1957 at St Brendan's Park in Birr, between Drumcullen and Shannon Rovers, in what was their first ever meeting in the final. Drumcullen won the match by 10–07 to 1–03 to claim their 15th championship title overall and a first championship title in three years.

== Results ==
=== Final ===
29 September 1957 Final	Drumcullen	10-07 - 1-03	Shannon Rovers	St Brendan's Park
