= 1935 Offaly Senior Hurling Championship =

Annual hurling competition season

- Champions: Tullamore (4th title)
- Runners-up: Clara

The 1935 Offaly Senior Hurling Championship was the 38th staging of the Offaly Senior Hurling Championship since its establishment by the Offaly County Board in 1896.

Tullamore entered the championship as the defending champions.

The final was played on 6 October 1935 at O'Connor Park in Tullamore, between Tullamore and Clara, in what was their first ever meeting in the final. Tullamore won the match by 6–07 to 2–00 to claim their fourth championship title overall and a second championship title in succession.

== Results ==
=== Final ===
6 October 1935 Final	Tullamore	6-07 - 2-00	Clara	O'Connor Park
