= 1938 Offaly Senior Hurling Championship =

Annual hurling competition season

- Champions: Birr (9th title); D. Hoctor (captain)
- Runners-up: Coolderry

The 1938 Offaly Senior Hurling Championship was the 41st staging of the Offaly Senior Hurling Championship since its establishment by the Offaly County Board in 1896.

Tullamore entered the championship as the defending champions.

The final was played on 18 September 1938 at St Brendan's Park in Birr, between Birr and Coolderry, in what was their first ever meeting in the final. Birr won the match by 1–06 to 2–01 to claim their fourth championship title overall and a first championship title in 23 years.

== Results ==
=== Final ===
18 September 1938 Final	Birr	1-06 - 2-10	Coolderry	St Brendan's Park
