= 1951 Offaly Senior Hurling Championship =

Annual hurling competition season

- Champions: Drumcullen (12th title)
- Runners-up: Birr

The 1951 Offaly Senior Hurling Championship was the 54th staging of the Offaly Senior Hurling Championship since its establishment by the Offaly County Board in 1896.

Drumcullen entered the championship as the defending champions.

The final was played on 16 September 1951 at St Brendan's Park in Birr, between Drumcullen and Birr, in what was their third meeting in the final overall. Drumcullen won the match by 2–12 to 5–02 to claim their 12th championship title overall and a second championship title in succession.

== Results ==
=== Final ===
16 September 1951 Final	Drumcullen	2-12 - 5-02	Birr	St Brendan's Park
