= 1944 Offaly Senior Hurling Championship =

Annual hurling competition season

- Champions: Birr (12th title)
- Runners-up: Tullamore

The 1944 Offaly Senior Hurling Championship was the 47th staging of the Offaly Senior Hurling Championship since its establishment by the Offaly County Board in 1896.

Birr entered the championship as the defending champions.

The final was played on 8 October 1944 at O'Connor Park in Tullamore, between Birr and Tullamore, in what was their second consecutive meeting in the final. Birr won the match by 4–04 to 4–00 to claim their 12th championship title overall and a second championship title in succession.

== Results ==
=== Final ===
8 October 1944 Final	Birr	4-04 - 4-00	Tullamore	O'Connor Park
