= 1954 Offaly Senior Hurling Championship =

Annual hurling competition season

- Champions: Drumcullen (14th title)
- Runners-up: Coolderry

The 1954 Offaly Senior Hurling Championship was the 57th staging of the Offaly Senior Hurling Championship since its establishment by the Offaly County Board in 1896.

Coolderry entered the championship as the defending champions.

The final was played on 3 October 1954 at St Brendan's Park in Birr, between Drumcullen and Coolderry, in what was their first meeting in the final in four years. Drumcullen won the match by 4–03 to 3–02 to claim their 14th championship title overall and a first championship title in two years.

== Results ==
=== Final ===
3 October 1954 Final	Drumcullen	4-03 - 3-02	Coolderry	St Brendan's Park
