= 1936 Offaly Senior Hurling Championship =

Annual hurling competition season

- Champions: Tullamore (5th title); E. Nolan (captain)
- Runners-up: Rahan; K. Grennan (captain)

The 1936 Offaly Senior Hurling Championship was the 39th staging of the Offaly Senior Hurling Championship since its establishment by the Offaly County Board in 1896.

Tullamore entered the championship as the defending champions.

The final was played on 20 September 1936 at St Brendan's Park in Birr, between Tullamore and Rahan, in what was their first ever meeting in the final. Tullamore won the match by 3–07 to 2–04 to claim their fifth championship title overall and a third championship title in succession.

== Results ==
=== Final ===
20 September 1936 Final	Tullamore	3-07 -m 2-04	Rahan	St Brendan's Park
