= 1942 Offaly Senior Hurling Championship =

Annual hurling competition season

- Champions: Coolderry (15th title)
- Runners-up: Birr

The 1942 Offaly Senior Hurling Championship was the 45th staging of the Offaly Senior Hurling Championship since its establishment by the Offaly County Board in 1896.

Drumcullen entered the championship as the defending champions, however, they were beaten by Coolderry in the semi-finals.

The final was played on 27 September 1942 at St Brendan's Park in Birr, between Coolderry and Birr, in what was their second meeting in the final overall. Coolderry won the match by 5–03 to 2–04 to claim their 15th championship title overall and a first championship title in three years.

== Results ==
=== Final ===
27 September 1942 Final	Coolderry	5-03 - 3-04	Birr	St Brendan's Park
