= 1952 Offaly Senior Hurling Championship =

Annual hurling competition season

- Champions: Drumcullen (13th title)
- Runners-up: Seir Kieran

The 1952 Offaly Senior Hurling Championship was the 55th staging of the Offaly Senior Hurling Championship since its establishment by the Offaly County Board in 1896.

Drumcullen entered the championship as the defending champions.

The final was played on 31 August 1952 at St Brendan's Park in Birr, between Drumcullen and Seir Kieran, in what was their first ever meeting in the final. Drumcullen won the match by 9–11 to 4–03 to claim their 13th championship title overall and a third championship title in succession.

== Results ==
=== Final ===
31 August 1952 Final	Drumcullen	9-11 - 4-03	Seir Kieran	St Brendan's Park
