= 1940 Offaly Senior Hurling Championship =

Annual hurling competition season

- Champions: Birr (10th title); J. Dooley (captain)
- Runners-up: Edenderry; P. McGlynn (captain)

The 1940 Offaly Senior Hurling Championship was the 43rd staging of the Offaly Senior Hurling Championship since its establishment by the Offaly County Board in 1896.

Coolderry entered the championship as the defending champions.

The final was played on 29 September 1940 at O'Connor Park in Tullamore, between Birr and Edenderry, in what was their second meeting in the final overall. Birr won the match by 4–08 to 2–01 to claim their fifth championship title overall and a first championship title in two years.

== Results ==
=== Final ===
29 September 1940 Final	Birr	4-08 - 2-01	Edenderry	O'Connor Park
