= 1932 Offaly Senior Hurling Championship =

Annual hurling competition season

- Champions: Tullamore (2nd title); Edward Nolan (captain)
- Runners-up: Coolderry; William Maher (captain)

The 1932 Offaly Senior Hurling Championship was the 35th staging of the Offaly Senior Hurling Championship since its establishment by the Offaly County Board in 1896.

Coolderry entered the championship as the defending champions.

The final was played on 7 August 1932 at St Brendan's Park in Birr, between Tullamore and Coolderry, in what was their fourth meeting in the final overall. Tullamore won the match by 6–04 to 3–02 to claim their second championship title overall and a first championship title in 23 years.

== Results ==
=== Final ===
7 August 1932 Final	Tullamore	6-04 - 3-02	Coolderry	St Brendan's Park
