= 1950 Offaly Senior Hurling Championship =

Annual hurling competition season

- Champions: Drumcullen (11th title)
- Runners-up: Coolderry

The 1950 Offaly Senior Hurling Championship was the 53rd staging of the Offaly Senior Hurling Championship since its establishment by the Offaly County Board in 1896.

Coolderry entered the championship as the defending champions.

The final was played on 27 August 1950 at St Brendan's Park in Birr, between Drumcullen and Coolderry, in what was their second consecutive meeting in the final. Drumcullen won the match by 4–07 to 0–05 to claim their 11th championship title overall and a first championship title in nine years.

== Results ==
=== Final ===
27 August 1950 Final	Drumcullen	4-07 - 0-05	Coolderry	St Brendan's Park
