= 1937 Offaly Senior Hurling Championship =

Annual hurling competition season

- Champions: Tullamore (6th title); James Flaherty (captain)
- Runners-up: Coolderry; Michael Dooley (captain)

The 1937 Offaly Senior Hurling Championship was the 40th staging of the Offaly Senior Hurling Championship since its establishment by the Offaly County Board in 1896.

Tullamore entered the championship as the defending champions.

The final was played on 17 October 1937 at St Brendan's Park in Birr, between Tullamore and Coolderry, in what was their fifth meeting in the final overall. Tullamore won the match by 5–04 to 3–04 to claim their sixth championship title overall and a fourth championship title in succession.

== Results ==
=== Final ===
| 17 October 1937 Final | Tullamore | 5-04 - 3-04 | Coolderry | St Brendan's Park |
