= 1939 Offaly Senior Hurling Championship =

Annual hurling competition season

- Champions: Coolderry (14th title); Joseph O'Connor (captain)
- Runners-up: Seir Kieran

The 1939 Offaly Senior Hurling Championship was the 42nd staging of the Offaly Senior Hurling Championship since its establishment by the Offaly County Board in 1896.

Birr entered the championship as the defending champions.

The final was played on 22 October 1939 at St Brendan's Park in Birr, between Coolderry and Seir Kieran, in what was their first ever meeting in the final. Coolderry won the match by 6–04 to 2–02 to claim their 14th championship title overall and a first championship title in eight years.

== Results ==
=== Final ===
22 October 1939 Final	Coolderry	6-04 - 2-02	Seir Kieran	St Brendan's Park
