= 1933 Offaly Senior Hurling Championship =

Annual hurling competition season

- Champions: Drumcullen (9th title)
- Runners-up: Kinnitty

The 1933 Offaly Senior Hurling Championship was the 36th staging of the Offaly Senior Hurling Championship since its establishment by the Offaly County Board in 1896.

Tullamore entered the championship as the defending champions.

The final was played on 27 August 1933 at Ballyduff Park in Tullamore, between Drumcullen and Kinnitty, in what was their second meeting in the final overall. Drumcullen won the match by 3–02 to 1–02 to claim their ninth championship title overall and a first championship title in four years.

== Results ==
=== Final ===
27 August 1933 Final	Drumcullen	3-02 - 1-02	Kinnitty	Ballyduff Park
