= 1941 Offaly Senior Hurling Championship =

Annual hurling competition season

- Champions: Drumcullen (10th title); T. Guinan (captain)
- Runners-up: Birr; J. Dooley (captain)

The 1941 Offaly Senior Hurling Championship was the 44th staging of the Offaly Senior Hurling Championship since its establishment by the Offaly County Board in 1896.

Birr entered the championship as the defending champions.

The final was played on 31 August 1941 at St Brendan's Park in Birr, between Drumcullen and Birr, in what was their second meeting in the final overall. Drumcullen won the match by 2–05 to 0–07 to claim their 10th championship title overall and a first championship title in eight years.

== Results ==
=== Final ===
31 August 1941 Final	Birr	2-05 - 0-07	Coolderry	St Brendan's Park
