= U20 Footballer of the Year =

Eirgrid Under-20 Footballer of the Year
- Country: (Republic of Ireland) Ireland
- Presented by: Gaelic Athletic Association
- First award: 2006
- Current holder: Shea O'Hare

The EirGrid U20 Footballer of the year, (previously known as the Cadbury's Hero of the Future) is a Gaelic football award given to the top performing under-20 (formerly under-21) player in the Provincial and All-Ireland Championship each year. The award was first awarded in 2006.

== List of winners ==
| Year | Player | County | Club |
|---|---|---|---|
| 2024 | Shea O'Hare | Tyrone | Ardboe |
| 2023 | James McGrath | Kildare | Athy |
| 2022 | Ruairí Canavan | Tyrone | Errigal Ciarán |
| 2021 | Jack Bryant | Offaly | Shamrocks |
| 2020 | Jack Glynn | Galway | Claregalway |
| 2019 | Ciarán Archer | Dublin | St Maur's |
| 2018 | Jimmy Hyland | Kildare | Ballyteague |
| 2017 | Aaron Byrne | Dublin | Na Fianna |
| 2016 | Diarmuid O'Connor | Mayo | Ballintubber |
| 2015 | Colin O'Riordan | Tipperary | JK Brackens |
| 2014 | Conor McHugh | Dublin | Na Fianna |
| 2013 | Ian Burke | Galway | Corofin |
| 2012 | Ciarán Kilkenny | Dublin | Castleknock |
| 2011 | Tom Flynn | Galway | Athenry |
| 2010 | Rory O'Carroll | Dublin | Kilmacud Crokes |
| 2009 | Colm O'Neill | Cork | Ballyclough |
| 2008 | Killian Young | Kerry | Renard |
| 2007 | Fintan Goold | Cork | Macroom |
| 2006 | Keith Higgins | Mayo | Ballyhaunis |
