= Tom Flynn (Gaelic footballer) =

Irish sportsperson

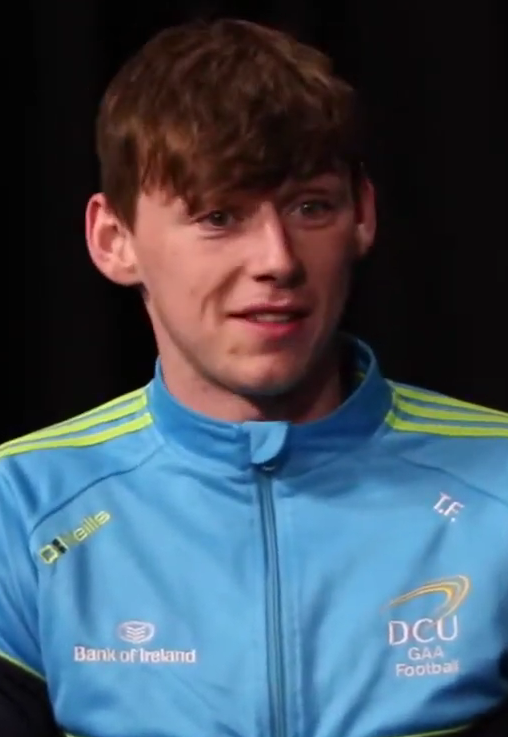

Personal information
- Native name: Tomás Ó Floinn (Irish)
- Nickname: Tommy
- Born: 17 April 1992 (age 34) Galway, Ireland
- Occupation: Teacher

Sport
- Sport: Gaelic Football
- Position: Midfield
Club
- Years: Club
- 2009–: Athenry
College
- Years: College
- DCU
College titles
- Sigerson titles: 1
Inter-county
- Years: County
- 2011–: Galway
Inter-county titles
- Connacht titles: 2
- NFL: 1

Tom Flynn (born 1991 or 1992) is an Irish sportsperson. Flynn plays club football and hurling with Athenry and has played senior inter-county football for Galway since 2011. Flynn was a member of the Galway teams that won the All-Ireland Under-21 Football Championship in 2011 and 2013.

He won the 2011 Cadbury's Hero of the Future award, receiving it at a ceremony at Croke Park.

== Honours ==
- Sigerson Cup (1): 2015 (C)
- Connacht Senior Football Championship (2): 2016, 2018
- Connacht Under-21 Football Championship (2): 2011, 2013
- All-Ireland Under-21 Football Championship (2): 2011, 2013

Awards
Preceded by Rory O'Carroll (Dublin)	U21 Footballer of the Year; 2011	Succeeded by Ciarán Kilkenny (Dublin)
