= 2024 All-Ireland Under-20 Football Championship =

Gaelic games tournament

Championship details
- Dates: 9 March – May 2024
- Teams: 31

All-Ireland Champions
- Winning team: Tyrone (7th win)
- Captain: Michael Rafferty
- Manager: Paul Devlin

All-Ireland Finalists
- Losing team: Kerry
- Captain: Rob Stack
- Manager: Tomás Ó Sé

Provincial Champions
- Munster: Kerry
- Leinster: Meath
- Ulster: Tyrone
- Connacht: Roscommon

Championship statistics
- Top Scorer: Shane McGinley (4-31)

The 2024 All-Ireland Under-20 Football Championship was the sixth staging of the All-Ireland Under-20 Championship and the 61st staging overall of a Gaelic football championship for players between the minor and senior grades. The competition ran from 9 March to 19 May 2024.

The defending champion was Kildare; however, the team was beaten by Meath in the Leinster semi-final.

The All-Ireland final was played at Laois Hire O'Moore Park in Portlaoise on 19 May 2024 between Tyrone and Kerry, in what was their third All-Ireland final meeting overall and a first meeting in 33 years. Tyrone won the match by 1–20 to 1–14 to claim a seventh All-Ireland title overall and a first title in two years.

Roscommon's Shane McGinley was the competition's top scorer with 4-31.

== Connacht Under-20 Football Championship ==
=== Connacht group stage ===
==== Connacht group stage table ====
Pos	Team	Pld	W	D	L	SF	SA	Diff	Pts	Qualification
1	Roscommon	4	1	3	0	56	43	13	5	Advance to final
2	Galway	4	2	1	1	62	53	9	5	Advance to semi-final
3	Sligo	4	1	2	1	58	57	1	4	Advance to semi-final
4	Leitrim	4	1	1	2	63	80	-17	3	
5	Mayo	4	1	1	2	57	63	-6	3	

==== Connacht group stage results ====
20 March 2024 Round 1	Galway	2-16 - 0-13	Leitrim	Duggan Park
	C Costello 0-10 (3 frees), M Thompson 1-2 (1 free), J Folan 1-0, C Murphy, S Birmingham, R Colleran, C Greaney 0-1 each.	Report	P Honeyman 0-6 (3 frees), B McNulty 0-3 (2 frees), P Keane 0-2, J Casey, D Cox 0-1 each.

20 March 2024 Round 1	Mayo	3-07 - 1-13	Roscommon	Dr Hyde Park
	N Hurley (1-2), D Beirne (1-2, 2fs), F McLaughlin (1-0), O Cronin (0-2), D Dolan (0-1, ‘45).	Report	S McGinley (1-8, 7fs, ‘45), B Nugent (0-3, 1f), R Conlon (0-2).

27 March 2024 Round 2	Mayo	0-16 - 2-06	Galway	Hasting MacHale Park
	D Beirne 0-4 (3 frees), D Reilly 0-2, N Hurley 0-2, T O’Flaherty, F McLoughlin, C Keaveney, S Morahan, D Doran (free), O Cronin, T Lydon, D Duffy 0-1 each.	Report	R Colleran 1-0, D Costello 1-0, F MacDonnacha 0-2 (1 mark), M Thompson, E McGrath (45), C Murphy, C Costello (free) 0-1 each.

27 March 2024 Round 2	Sligo	0-09 - 0-09	Roscommon	Markievicz Park
	E Rooney (0-3, 1f); L Marren (0-2, 2f); R Sloyan (0-2); R Doherty (0-1); R Niland (0-1).	Report	S McGinley (0-3, 1f, 1m); R Carthy (0-2, 2f); R Hester (0-1); B Nugent (0-1, 1f); E Carthy (0-1); C Ryan (0-1, 1m).

3 April 2024 Round 3	Leitrim	3-12 - 0-16	Mayo	Seán O'Heslin Memorial Park
	P Honeyman (0-10, 7f, 2m), J Casey (1-1, 1f); P Moran (1-0), B McNulty (0-1).	Report	D Beirne (0-6, 5f), T O'Flaherty (0-4, 2f); N Hurley (0-3), T Lydon (0-2), O Cronin (0-1),.

3 April 2024 Round 3	Galway	2-16 - 2-12	Sligo	Tuam Stadium
	M Thompson 0-6; C Costello 1-2; C Heneghan 1-1; C Mulhern, C Murphy, R Colleran 0-2 each; S McGlinchey 0-1.	Report	C Walsh, R Niland 1-2; E Rooney 0-3; R Doherty 0-2; C Sheridan, C Flynn, M McDaniel 0-1 each

10 April 2024 Round 4	Roscommon	0-06 - 0-06	Galway	Dr Hyde Park
	S McGinley 0-3f, R Hester 0-1, R Heneghan 0-1, N O’Donnell 0-1.	Report	C Costello 0-2, C Murphy 0-2, M Thompson 0-1f, C Heneghan 0-1m.

10 April 2024 Round 4	Sligo	2-11 - 1-14	Leitrim	Markievicz Park
	L Marren 1-4 (0-2f); C Flynn 1-1; E Rooney, R Sloyan, C Sheridan 0-2 each.	Report	D Coen 1-2; B McNulty 0-4; J Casey 0-3; P Honeyman 0-2; P Keane, J McGloin, T Plunkett 0-1 each

17 April 2024 Round 5	Mayo	0-09 - 0-14	Sligo	Hastings MacHale Park
	O Cronin, N Hurley (0-2 each), S Morahan, T O'Flaherty, C Dawson, F McLaughlin, D Beirne (0-1 each).	Report	L Marren (0-6, 3fs), J Donlon, E Rooney (0-2 each), D McLoughlin, R Niland, M McDaniel, C Flynn (1m) (0-1each).

17 April 2024 Round 5	Leitrim	2-06 - 3-16	Roscommon	Seán O'Heslin Memorial Park
	S McGinley 1–6 (1 45) B Nugent 1-3 (0-1m) N O'Donnell 1-1; R Dowling 0-2; R Conlan, S Walsh, R Carthy, E O'Reilly 0-1 each.	Report	P Honeyman 1-3 (0-1f), B Guckian 1-1, B McNulty 0-1f, J Casey 0-1.

=== Connacht semi-final ===
24 April 2024 Semi-final	Galway	0-23 - 1-12	Sligo	Hastings Insurance MacHale Park
	M Thompson (0-4, 1f), J Mullen (0-3), C Murphy (0-3), C Costello (0-3, 1f, 1 mark); E McGrath (0-2,‘45s); M Mannion (0-2); S McGlinchey (0-2), R Coen (0-1), J Lonergan (0-1), F MacDonnacha (0-1), JC Mulhern (0-1).	Report	L Marren (0-6, 3fs), C Flynn (1-0), E Rooney (0-3), R O’Kelly-Lynch (0-1), R Sloyan (0-1); C Sheridan (0-1).

=== Connacht final ===
4 May 2024 Final	Roscommon	3-13 - 0-17	Galway	Hastings MacHale Park
	S McGinley (1-6, three frees, one mark); R Dowling (1-2); N O’Donnell (1-1); S Lambe, R Hester, B Nugent (m), R Heneghan (0-1 each)	Report	M Thompson (2 frees), J Mullen (0-4 each), F Mac Donnacha (1m), C Costello (1f) (0-3 each); S McGlinchey, R Coen, M Mannion (0-1 each)

== Leinster Under-20 Football Championship ==
=== Leinster group 1 ===
==== Leinster group 1 table ====
Pos	Team	Pld	W	D	L	SF	SA	Diff	Pts	Qualification
1	Kildare	3	2	0	1	37	30	7	4	Advance to semi-finals
2	Louth	3	2	0	1	48	42	6	4	Advance to quarter-finals
3	Longford	3	1	0	2	39	50	-11	2	
4	Offaly	3	1	0	2	29	31	-2	2	

==== Leinster group 1 results ====
26 March 2024 Round 1	Kildare	1-15 - 0-11	Longford	Hawkfield Centre of Excellence
	N Dolan 0-4 (2f), R Harris 1-0, R Sinkey (2f), C Dalton 0-3 each, D McPartlin 0-2 (2’45), J Harris, K Browne, D Crowley 0-1 each.	Report	M Carey 0-4 (2f), C Lynch, Michael Flynn (2f) 0-3 each, P Moran 0-1 each.

26 March 2024 Round 1	Louth	1-11 - 2-06	Offaly	Louth Centre of Excellence
	K McArdle 1-3 (2f), T McDonnell 0-2; J Maguire 0-2 (1f), D Dorian 0-1, S Reynolds 0-1, A McGlew 0-1, P Grimes-Murphy 0-1.	Report	S Afolabi Joseph 1-0, C Bourke 1-0, D O’Neill 0-2; C Melia 0-2 (2f); R Kellaghan 0-1, R Gallagher 0-1 (1f).

2 April 2024 Round 2	Longford	2-12 - 3-14	Louth	Bertie Allen Park
	M Flynn 1-3 (0-2f), M Carey 0-6 (3f), A Flynn 1-0, P Moran 0-1, J Burke 0-1, H Kiernan 0-1.	Report	K McArdle 2-3 (0-1 45), L Flynn 1-1, S Reynolds 0-3, P Grimes-Murphy 0-2, J Maguire 0-2 (1f); T McDonnell 0-1, D Dorian 0-1 (1m), K Martin 0-1.

2 April 2024 Round 2	Offaly	0-08 - 1-04	Kildare	Faithful Fields
	M Dalton 0-3; C Melia ('45'), D O'Neill, C McKeon, R Kellaghan (f) and N Furlong 0-1 each.	Report	R Harris 1-0; F Cooke 0-2; C Dalton and R Sinkey (f) 0-1 each.

9 April 2024 Round 3	Longford	0-10 - 0-09	Offaly	Bertie Allen Park
	M Carey 0-7 (3f, 1 ‘45) J Brady Hynes 0-2 (1 mark) P Moran 0-1.	Report	C Melia 0-3 (2f), R Gallagher 0-2 (1f), C Bourke 0-1, S Doran 0-1, C Foran 0-1f, N Furlong 0-1

9 April 2024 Round 3	Louth	0-11 - 2-06	Kildare	Darver Centre of Excellence
	K McArdle 0-4 (3 frees, 45), J Maguire 0-2 (1 free), J Rogers 0-1, D McDonnell 0-1, A McGlew 0-1, L Flynn 0-1.	Report	S Savage 1-0, O Grufferty 1-0, C Dalton 0-2, D Crowley 0-1, K Browne 0-1, N Dolan 0-1 (free), R Sinkey 0-1 (free).

=== Leinster group 2 ===
==== Leinster group 2 table ====
Pos	Team	Pld	W	D	L	SF	SA	Diff	Pts	Qualification
1	Laois	3	3	0	0	47	25	22	6	Advance to quarter-finals
2	Wicklow	3	2	0	1	38	35	3	4	Advance to quarter-finals
3	Wexford	3	1	0	0	42	43	-1	2	
4	Carlow	3	0	0	3	36	60	-24	0	

==== Leinster group 2 results ====
26 March 2024 Round 1	Laois	3-08 - 0-10	Carlow	LOETB Laois Centre of Excellence
	J Brennan (2-3 3fs), K Byrne (1-0); J Byrne (0-2), J Kelly (0-1), C Nolan (0-1); C Maher (0-1).	Report	L Gavin (0-3fs), A Burgess (0-2); J Phiri (0-2), J Egan (0-1); B Cassidy (0-1), C Brady (0-1).

26 March 2024 Round 1	Wicklow	0-12 - 1-07	Wexford	Blessington Grounds
	J Boland (0-3); P Kavanagh (0-3, 2 frees), A Kavanagh (0-2, 1 free), C Fee (0-2, 1 free), B Hurley (0-1), É Nolan (0-1).	Report	J Morris (1-0), D Cooke-Leonard (0-2), L Donoghue (0-2 frees), S Hughes (0-2 frees), M Ellis (0-1).

2 April 2024 Round 2	Wexford	0-09 - 1-09	Laois	St Patrick's Park
	W Foley (3f, 1, 45) 0-4; J Doyle, L Donoghue (f), S Hughes, D Cooke Leonard, C Kehoe 0-1 each.	Report	C Lee 1-1; J O'Brien (3f) 0-4; C Murphy (1f) 0-2; A Hunt, D Slevin 0-1 each.

2 April 2024 Round 2	Carlow	0-07 - 3-11	Wicklow	Netwatch Cullen Park
	L Gavin (0-3, 2f), B Cassidy (0-1), B Kelly (0-1), K Nolan (0-1), C Fagan (0-1).	Report	C Fee (1-2), P Kavanagh (1-2), J Boland (1-1), B Hurley (0-3, 1f), C Baker (0-2), A Kavanagh (0-1, f).

9 April 2024 Round 3	Wicklow	0-06 - 2-12	Laois	Blessington Grounds
	B Hurley (0-2, 1f), É Nolan (0-1, f); C Fee (0-1, f), A Byrne (0-1), D Prendergast (0-1).	Report	C Lee (1-4, 3f), C Maher (1-1, f), R Lalor (0-2, 1f), J Byrne (0-1), J Kelly (0-1), C Murphy (0-1), D Slevin (0-1), E Drury (0-1).

9 April 2024 Round 3	Wexford	4-11 - 2-13	Carlow	St Patrick's Park
	R Gilbert 2-1, D Kehoe 0-4, M Ellis and L Donoghue 1-0 each, D Cooke-Leonard 0-3 (1 line ball, 1f), S Hughes 0-2 (1f), J Doyle 0-1.	Report	L Gavin 1-5 (0-4fs, 0-1m), J Egan 1-0, C Brady 0-2, J Brady 0-2 (1m), S Cormican, M Mullen, Kyle Nolan, B Kelly 0-1 each.

=== Leinster group 3 ===
==== Leinster group 1 table ====
Pos	Team	Pld	W	D	L	SF	SA	Diff	Pts	Qualification
1	Dublin	2	2	0	0	31	16	15	4	Advance to semi-finals
2	Meath	2	1	0	1	28	24	4	2	Advance to quarter-finals
3	Westmeath	2	0	0	2	17	36	-19	0	

==== Leinster group 3 results ====
26 March 2024 Round 1	Westmeath	0-06 - 1-15	Dublin	Kinnegad Grounds
	B Cooney 0-2 (2f), T O’Donovan, R Cole, E Bracken, S Ormsby 0-1 apiece.	Report	K Flynn 1-2, P Reynolds Hand(2f), C Burke, J McCarville 0-3 each, M McNally 0-2, L O’Boyle, D Murphy 0-1 apiece.

2 April 2024 Round 2	Meath	0-18 - 2-05	Westmeath	Asbourne Grounds
	J Murphy 0-6 (3f), R Stafford 0-4 (1f), C Commons 0-3, R McConnell 0-1, K Smyth 0-1; J Kinlough 0-1, B O’Halloran 0-1, H Corcoran 0-1.	Report	B Cooney 0-4 (3f), T Baker 1-0, J Duncan 1-0, M Thornton 0-1.

9 April 2024 Round 3	Dublin	0-13 - 1-07	Meath	Parnell Park
	P Reynolds Hand (3f), G McEneaney 0-3 each, C Burke, J Quigley (1 mark), J McCarville 0-2 each, L O’Boyle 0-1.	Report	C O’Connor 1-0, R McConnell 0-2, E Armstrong, R Stafford, J Harkin, J Murphy (f), H Corcoran (f) 0-1 apiece.

=== Leinster quarter-finals ===
16 April 2024 Quarter-final	Meath	4-08 - 1-10	Laois	Ashbourne Grounds
	J Murphy 2-2 (1f), R McConnell, E Armstrong 1-0 each, H Corcoran 0-2f, C McWeeney, C Duke, B O’Halloran, C Commons 0-1 each.	Report	J Kelly 1-1, J O’Brien (3f), C Murphy (2f) 0-3 each, J Byrne 0-2, C Nolan 0-1.

16 April 2024 Quarter-final	Louth	2-11 - 1-09	Wicklow	Darver Centre of Excellence
	K McArdle 1-7 (0-4f, 0-1 45); P Grimes-Murphy 1-1; D Dorian 0-2; S Reynolds 0-1.	Report	J Heathy 1-0; C Fee, B Hurley (1f), P Kavanagh (2f) 0-2 each; J Boland, C Baker, C Deering 0-1 each.

=== Leinster semi-finals ===
23 April 2024 Semi-final	Kildare	0-10 - 2-09	Meath	Hawkfield Centre of Excellence
	R Sinkey (0-2 one free), C Dalton (0-2); K Browne (0-2), N Cullen (0-1), M Gibbons (0-1); F Cooke (0-1); J Cunningham (0-1).	Report	J Murphy (0-4 one free), S O’Hare (1-0); E Armstrong (1-0), H Corcoran (0-3 frees), K Smyth (0-1); C Duke (0-1);

23 April 2024 Semi-final	Dublin	1-09 - 1-13	Louth	Parnell Park
	L O’Boyle 1-0, M McNally 0-3, P Reynolds Hand (2f), C Burke 0-2 each, J Quigley (f), K Flynn (f) 0-1 each.	Report	K McArdle 0-6 (4f), S Reynolds 1-0, T McDonnell 0-3, J Maguire (f), C Maher, D McDonnell, A McGlew 0-1 apiece.

=== Leinster final ===
29 April 2024 Final	Meath	3-13 - 0-12	Louth	Parnell Park
	J Murphy (1-5, 2 frees); E Armstrong (1-2); T Martyn (1-0); L Kelly, H Corcoran (1 free) (0-2 each); R Stafford, J Kinlough (0-1 each).	Report	K McArdle (0-5, 3 frees); P Grimes-Murphy (0-4); J Maguire (0-3, 2 frees).	Referee: D. Stynes (Dublin)

GK	1	Oisín McDermott (Ballinlough)
RCB	2	Conor Ennis (Ballinabrackey)
FB	3	Liam Kelly (Ratoath) (c)
LCB	4	Seán O'Hare (Rathkenny)
RHB	5	Éamonn Armstrong (Duleek/Bellewstown)
CHB	6	John O'Regan (Skryne)
LHB	7	Killian Smyth (Castletown)
MF	8	Jack Kinlough (St Peter's Dunboyne)
MF	9	Charlie O'Connor (Dunshaughlin)
RHF	10	Shaun Leonard (St Colmcille's)
CHF	11	Rian Stafford (Kilmainhamwood)
LHF	12	Conor Duke (Dunshaughlin)
RCF	13	Hughie Corcoran (Drumbaragh Emmets)
FF	14	Jamie Murphy (St Patrick's)
LCF	15	Rian McConnell (Castletown)
Substitutes:
	16	Conor McWeeney (Kilbride) for Stafford
	17	Tadhg Martyn (Slane) for Leonard
	18	John Harkin (St Peter's Dunboyne) for Corcoran
	19	Séimí Byrne (Seneschalstown) for O'Hare
	20	John Mannion (St Patrick's) for Smyth

GK	1	Cian O'Donoghue (Geraldines)
RCB	2	Fionn Tipping (Na Piarsaigh/Blackrock)
FB	3	Cameron Maher (St Kevin's)
LCB	4	Cormac McKeown (St Joseph's)
RHB	5	Tadhg McDonnell (St Mary's)
CHB	6	Aaron McGlew (St Fechin's)
LHB	7	Keelin Martin (St Mary's)
MF	8	Dara McDonnell (Naomh Máirtín)
MF	9	Seán Callaghan (St Mary's)
RHF	10	James Maguire (Westerns)
CHF	11	Liam Flynn (Mattock Rangers)
LHF	12	Darragh Dorian (Naomh Máirtín)
RCF	13	Pearse Grimes-Murphy (St Joseph's)
FF	14	Seán Reynolds (Stabannon Parnells) (c)
LCF	15	Kieran McArdle (St Bride's)
Substitutes
	16	Ronan Deery (Kilkerley Emmets) for Tipping
	17	James Rogers (Hunterstown Rovers) for Dorian
	18	Conor McGinty (O'Raghallaighs) for Flynn
	19	Fionn Cumiskey (Kilkerley Emmets) for Callaghan
	20	Shane Halpenny (Hunterstown Rovers) for Maguire
	21	Tadhg Kellett (Glyde Rangers) for Martin

== Munster Under-20 Football Championship ==
=== Munster phase 1 ===
==== Munster phase 1 table ====
Pos	Team	Pld	W	D	L	SF	SA	Diff	Pts	Qualification
1	Tipperary	3	2	1	0	51	29	22	5	Advance to phase 2
2	Clare	3	2	0	1	34	23	11	4	Advance to phase 2
3	Limerick	3	1	1	1	31	36	-5	3	
4	Waterford	3	0	0	3	26	54	-28	0	

==== Munster phase 1 results ====
15 March 2024 Round 1	Tipperary	2-06 - 0-12	Limerick	Fethard Town Park
	D McVicker 0-1f, O Jones 1-1 each; J Lawrence 0-2; D Hogan, P O’Keeffe 0-1 each.	Report	R Quirke 0-6 (0-2f); E Rigter 0-3 (0-2f); D Hynes 0-2; D Murray 0-1f.

16 March 2024 Round 1	Waterford	0-06 - 0-13	Clare	Bushy Park
	M O’Brien (0-5, 0-4 frees 0-1 45); T Fennell (0-1)	Report	D Keane (0-6 frees); J Moloney (0-3), S Neylon, T Curran, O Cunningham and C Fennell (0-1 each)

23 March 2024 Round 2	Clare	1-06 - 1-08	Tipperary	Páirc Naomh Mhuire
	A Kelly (1-0); D Culligan (1f) E Rouine (0-2 each); S McMahon, D Keane (f) (0-1 each)	Report	O Jones (1-4, 1f); M Freaney, C Grogan (f), R McGrath (’45), J Higgins (0-1 each)

23 March 2024 Round 2	Limerick	2-07 - 2-06	Waterford	Ballyagran Grounds
	S O’Brien 1-0; D Hynes 1-0; R Quirke, D Murray, E Rigter 0-2 each; C Ó Duinn 0-1.	Report	R Fennell 0-3; M O’Brien (pen), M O’Sullivan 1-0 each; S Pender 0-2 (frees); J Bruton 0-1.

30 March 2024 Round 3	Waterford	0-08 - 5-13	Tipperary	Bushy Park
	S Pender 0-5 (0-4 frees), M O’Brien 0-2 (0-1 free, 0-1 45), M O’Sullivan 0-1	Report	O Jones 2-6 (1-0 pen, 0-3 frees), S. Ryan (1-2), C. Groogan & M Freaney (1-0 each), S O’Meara (0-2) C King, D Hogan (Free), T Charles (0-1 each)

30 March 2024 Round 3	Limerick	0-06 - 1-09	Clare	Ballyagran Grounds
	R Quirke 0-2 (both frees); E Rigter, B Smith, P Murphy, D Murray 0-1 each.	Report	C Fennell 0-4 (0-1 free); E Rouine 1-1; S McMahon, D Culligan, O Cunningham, T Curran 0-1.

=== Munster phase 2 ===
==== Munster phase 2 table ====
Pos	Team	Pld	W	D	L	SF	SA	Diff	Pts	Qualification
1	Kerry	3	3	0	0	49	29	20	6	Advance to Munster final
2	Cork	3	2	0	1	58	35	23	4	Advance to Munster final
3	Tipperary	3	1	0	2	33	39	-6	2	
4	Clare	3	0	0	3	25	62	-37	0	

==== Munster phase 2 fixtures and results ====
10 April 2024 Round 1	Tipperary	0-07 - 0-14	Cork	Fethard Town Park
	O Jones 0-5 (0-4 f), E Doocey, S Ryan 0-1 each.	Report	H O’Connor 0-5 (0-3 f, 0-1 m), R O’Shaughnessy 0-3, D Sheedy (0-2 m), B Hayes (0-1 f) 0-2 each, O Corcoran, A O’Sullivan 0-1 each.

10 April 2024 Round 1	Clare	0-05 - 1-13	Kerry	Páirc Naomh Mhuire
	D Keane 0-2, C Fennell 0-1, T Curran 0-1, D Culligan 0-1.		C Dillon 0-7, C Keating 1-0, R Stack 0-2, E Healy 0-2, P Lane 0-1, L Crowley 0-1.

17 April 2024 Round 2	Cork	0-11 - 1-12	Kerry	SuperValu Páirc Uí Chaoimh
	H O’Connor (0-6, 0-2 frees, 0-1 mark); A O’Sullivan, E Myers, L O’Herlihy (free), R Corkery (free), D Sheedy (0-1 each).	Report	C Dillon (1-5, 0-3 frees, 0-2 ‘45s); G Evans, L Crowley (0-2 each); E Healy, T Kennedy (0-1 mark), M Lynch (0-1 each).

17 April 2024 Round 2	Tipperary	1-10 - 0-07	Clare	Ardfinnan Grounds
	O Jones (0-3, 2f); M Freaney (1-0); P O’Keeffe, D Hogan (2f) (0-2 each); S Ryan (f), R McGrath (’45), D O’Brien (0-1 each).	Report	D Keane (0-3, 2f); C Fennell, T Curran (1m) (0-2 each).

24 April 2024 Round 3	Cork	5-18 - 0-13	Clare	SuperValu Páirc Uí Chaoimh
	H O’Connor (2-2, 0-2 frees); E Myers (1-4, 0-1 mark); R Corkery (1-3, 0-1 free); D Sheedy (1-2); M McSweeney (0-2); D Twomey, G Daly, S Copps, R O’Shaughnessy, J O’Neill (0-1 each).	Report	D Keane (0-5, 0-4 frees, 0-1 mark); D Culligan (0-2 frees), S McMahon (0-2 each); A Kelly, L Pyne, M Kelly, T Curran (0-1 each).

24 April 2024 Round 3	Kerry	1-15 - 1-10	Tipperary	Austin Stack Park
	T Kennedy 1-2, I O’Sullivan 0-4 (0-3fs), C Dillon 0-4 (0-1f), L Crowley 0-2, D Kirby, O Ferris, E Healy 0-1 each.	Report	O Jones 0-4 (0-2fs), D Hogan 1-1, R McGrath 0-2 (‘45s), S Ryan(f), M Freaney, C Smith 0-1 each.

=== Munster final ===
1 May 2024 Final	Kerry	1-15 - 0-12	Cork	Austin Stack Park
	C Dillon 0-6 (0-4 f, 0-1 m), T Kennedy 1-0, D Kirby 0-2, G Evans, R Diggin, C Keating, O Ferris, L Crowley, A Crowley, C Brosnan 0-1 each.	Report	H O’Connor 0-3 (0-1 f), D Sheedy 0-2, R O’Shaughnessy, D O’Brien (f), E Myers, R Corkery (45), G Kearney, O Corcoran, C Molloy 0-1 each.

== Ulster Under-20 Football Championship ==
=== Ulster section A ===
==== Ulster section A table ====
Pos	Team	Pld	W	D	L	SF	SA	Diff	Pts	Qualification
1	Tyrone	4	3	1	0	99	38	61	7	Advance to semi-finals
2	Derry	4	3	0	1	77	37	40	6	Advance to quarter-finals
3	Monaghan	4	2	0	2	49	71	-22	4	Advance to quarter-finals
4	Down	4	1	1	2	56	55	1	3	
5	Antrim	4	0	0	4	59	86	-27	0	

==== Ulster section A group results ====
9 March 2024 Round 1	Antrim	0-07 - 8-16	Tyrone	Dunsilly Centre of Excellence
	T Shivers (0-5), S Laverty (0-1)	Report	C Owens (2-6), E McElholm (3-2), C Devlin (1-3), G Potter (1-1), O Gormley (1-0) S O’Hare (0-2), R Cassidy and O Brolly (0-1).

9 March 2024 Round 1	Down	0-09 - 2-14	Derry	Páirc Esler
	E Loughran 0-4, S Carr 0-3 (2f), D Ruddy 1-0, L Quinn and D Mussen 0-1 each	Report	O Doherty 1-5 (3f), E Higgins (2f), C McGrogan 0-3 each, J McGuckian 1-0, N O’Donnell. C Heron and T Rogers 0-1 each

20 March 2024 Round 2	Monaghan	2-08 - 1-06	Antrim	St Mary's Park
	B McCaul (1-1), S Mooney (0-4, 3f), K Duffy (1-0), F Carlolan (0-1); P Doogan-Burke (0-1), D Mee (0-1).	Report	T Shivers (0-4); J Hannon (1-0), T McCormick (0-1), C McCann (0-1).

20 March 2024 Round 2	Tyrone	0-11 - 1-08	Down	O'Neill's Healy Park
	C Owens (0-3 1f), G Potter (0-3), R Cassidy (0-1 1f), O Gormley (0-1), N Grimes (0-1), C Daly (0-1), Cormac Devlin (0-1).	Report	D Scullion 1-0, J Doran 0-3, D Mussen 0-1, S Carr 0-1, L Quinn 0-1.

27 March 2024 Round 3	Derry	1-09 - 0-13	Tyrone	Celtic Park
	O Doherty (0-4, 2f), J McGuckian (1-0); T Rogers (0-1 45); C Spiers (0-1), E Higgins (0-1), R McNicholl (0-1), C McGrogan (0-1).	Report	G Potter (0-2); R Cassidy (0-2, 1f), C Owens (0-2, 1m), R Fox (0-1), C Daly (0-1); S O'Hare (0-1), J Clarke (0-1), O Gormley (0-1), R McCullagh (0-1), N Grimes (0-1).

27 March 2024 Round 3	Down	0-13 - 1-12	Monaghan	Páirc Esler
	J Doran 0-3, D Scullion 0-2, S Carr 0-2, C Cunningham 0-2, R Kelly 0-1, R Quinn 0-1, D Mussen 0-1, T McCarroll 0-1.	Report	S Mooney 0-4, D Mee 1-0, P Doogan-Burke 0-3, O McGorman 0-1, S Callan 0-1, N Sherlock 0-1, T Hughes 0-1, B McCaul 0-1.

3 April 2024 Round 4	Monaghan	2-06 - 1-11	Derry	St Mary's Park
	K Duffy 0-3f, B McCaul 1-1, A Carey 1-0, C Conlon 0-2f	Report	O Doherty 0-5 (0-3f), J McGuckian 1-0, E Higgins 0-1f, R Forbes 0-1, N O’Donnell 0-1, R Walls 0-1, S Young 0-1, C McGrogan 0-1

3 April 2024 Round 4	Antrim	1-06 - 5-08	Down	Dunsilly Centre of Excellence
	N Fallon 1-0, T Shivers 0-2 frees, C Donnelly, N Duffy, C Gribbin an S Laverty 0-1 each	Report	S Carr 2-0, J Doran 1-4, 0-3 frees, S O’Neill and M McSwiggan 1-0 each, R Kelly, D Mussen, D Milligan and M Murdock 0-1 each.

10 April 2024 Round 5	Tyrone	5-20 - 0-08	Monaghan	Fr Peter Campbell Park
	R McCullagh (0-1m), E McElholm 1-3 each; M Rafferty 1-1; C Devlin, O Brolly 1-0 each; R Cassidy 0-3 (1f); P McCann, G Potter 0-2 each; C O’Neill, R Fox, N Grimes, R Donnelly, C Owens, S O’Hare 0-1 each.	Report	K Duffy 0-4 (3f); D McKenna 0-2 (1 ’45); L McManus (f), N Sherlock 0-1 each.

10 April 2024 Round 5	Derry	5-16 - 0-03	Antrim	Owenbeg Centre of Excellence
	R McNicholl (2-1), N O'Donnell (1-1), O Murphy (1-1, 1pen), C Chambers (0-4), R Forbes (1-0), P McGurk (0-1), J Murray (0-1), O O'Doherty (0-1, 1f), A Donnelly (0-1), C McGrogan (0-1), S McCann (0-1), C Heron (0-1), R Walls (0-1), E Higgins (0-1)	Report	G Mac Adhaim (0-1), N Duffy (0-1, 1f), C Gribben (0-1).

==== Ulster section B table ====
Pos	Team	Pld	W	D	L	SF	SA	Diff	Pts	Qualification
1	Donegal	3	3	0	0	46	28	18	6	Advance to semi-finals
2	Armagh	3	2	0	1	35	29	6	4	Advance to quarter-finals
3	Cavan	3	1	0	2	44	50	-6	2	Advance to quarter-finals
4	Fermanagh	3	0	0	3	26	44	-18	0	

==== Ulster section B results ====
9 March 2024 Round 1	Fermanagh	0-07 - 1-10	Armagh	St Joseph's Park
	C Brennan 0-2, C Fitzpatrick 0-1, M McDermott 0-1, S McCarron 0-1, S Conlon 0-1, C O'Hanlon 0-1.	Report

13 March 2024 Round 1	Cavan	0-16 - 2-15	Donegal	Kingspan Breffni Park
	Darragh Lovett (0-9, 6fs 2m), Cian Keaney (0-2, 1f), Lorcan Reilly (0-2, 1m); Daire Madden (0-1), Oliver McCrystal (0-1), Ryan Tobin (0-1).	Report	L McGlynn (0-5, 1f), S Carr (1-1); L Bell (1-0, og); KJ Molloy (0-3, 1m), P McElwee (0-3), D Gallagher (0-1); O Caulfield (0-1), C McGinty (0-1).

27 March 2024 Round 2	Armagh	2-09 - 2-07	Cavan	BOX-IT Athletic Grounds
	P Blessing (1-1); G Murphy (1-0, pen), B O’Hagan (0-2, 1f), T Grimley (0-2), O Carragher (0-1); C O’Neill (0-1); R O’Brien (0-1), R Duffy (0-1);	Report	Darragh Lovett (1-3, 2f), Barry Donnelly (1-0); C Keaney (0-2, 2f), D Madden (0-1), B McGahan (0-1).

27 March 2024 Round 2	Donegal	1-13 - 0-05	Fermanagh	MacCumhaill Park
	P McElwee 1-3, 1m; L McGlynn 0-3,1f; KJ Molloy 0-2, 1f, 1m; O Caulfield 0-2; S Carr 0-1, 1m; F Roarty 0-1; K Magee 0-1.	Report	D Owens 0-3; C O’Hanlon 0-1; M Burns 0-1.

10 April 2024 Round 3	Fermanagh	1-11 - 2-09	Cavan	Brewster Park
	C O’Hanlon (0-4), M Burns (1-0), S Conlon (0-2), K Fitzpatrick (0-2), D Owens (0-1); J Quinlan (0-1), C O’Brien (0-1).	Report	D Lovett (1-3), C Keaney (1-2), E Hartin (0-1); F Shehu (0-1), Matthew Smith (0-1), D Madden (0-1).

13 April 2024 Round 3	Donegal	1-06 - 0-07	Armagh	MacCumhaill Park
	KJ Molloy 1-1, 1m; L McGlynn 0-3, 3f; K Magee 0-1; S Ward 0-1, 1f.	Report	P Blessing 0-2, B O’Hagan 0-2, 2f; R O’Brien, F O’Brien and R Duffy 0-1.

=== Ulster quarter-finals ===
17 April 2024 Quarter-final	Derry	1-11 - 0-07	Cavan	Owenbeg Centre of Excellence
	O Doherty 1-4 (4f), N O’Donnell, R Forbes 0-2 each, E Higgins, C Heron and P McGurk 0-1 each	Report	C Keaney 0-3 (2f), D Madden 0-2, D Lovett (f) and B Donnelly 0-1 each.

17 April 2024 Quarter-final	Armagh	0-13 - 1-15	Monaghan	BOX-IT Athletic Grounds
	R O’Brien 0-6 (5f), G Murphy 0-2, P O’Keefe 0-1, A O’Neill 0-1, F O’Brien 0-1, F Boylan 0-1, T Browne 0-1.	Report	S Mooney 0-10 (8f), B McCaul 1-1, D McKenna 0-2, O McGorman 0-1, S Callan 0-1.

=== Ulster semi-finals ===
24 April 2024 Semi-final	Tyrone	2-09 - 0-14	Monaghan	O'Neill's Healy Park
	Cormac Devlin, R Fox 1-0 each, R McCullagh (1m), E McElholm 0-2 each, G Potter, O Brolly, S O’Hare Conor Devlin, R Cassidy 0-1 each.	Report	S Mooney 0-10 (6f, 2m, 1’45), F Carolan, O McGorman, D McKenna, K Duffy (m) 0-1 each.

24 April 2024 Semi-final	Donegal	0-14 - 1-12	Derry	MacCumhaill Park
	L McGlynn 0-4 (2f), S Martin, C Reid, S Ward (45), K Magee, S Carr, K Lynch, C McMenamin, P McElwee (m), KJ Molloy (m) and C McGinty 0-1 each.	Report	O Doherty 1-2 (2f), R Forbes 0-3, R McNicholl 0-2, C Chambers, E Higgins (f), C Spiers, C Heron and P McGurk 0-1 each.

=== Ulster final ===
1 May 2024 Final	Tyrone	3-10 - 2-13 (3–1 p)	Derry	BOX-IT Athletic Grounds
	R McCullagh 1-2 (0-1f), S O’Hare, R McHugh 1-0 each, R Cassidy 0-3 (1f), E McElholm 0-2, C O’Neill, C Owens, O Brolly 0-1 each	Report	J McGuckian, R McNicholl 1-0 each, O Doherty 0-4 (3f), S McCann, N O’Donnell, R McGill 0-2 each, D McDermott, C McGrogan, R Walls 0-1 each

== All-Ireland Under-20 Football Championship ==
=== All-Ireland semi-finals ===
11 May 2024 Semi-final	Meath	0-11 - 0-12	Kerry	FBD Semple Stadium
	J Murphy (0-5,2fs), H Corcoran (0-2, 1f), J O’Regan, J Kinlough, C O’Connor and S Leonard (0-1 each)	Report	C Dillon (0-42fs), E Healy and L Crowley (0-2 each), R Diggin, D Kirby, T Kennedy and P Lane (0-1 each)

11 May 2024 Semi-final	Tyrone	3-18 - 3-08	Roscommon	Kingspan Breffni Park
	E McElholm 1-2, C O’Neill 1-1, S O’Hare 1-1, R McCullagh 0-3, R Cassidy 0-3 (0-1f), C McAneney 0-2 (0-1f, 0-1 45), C Devlin 0-2, Ó Brolly 0-1, R Fox 0-1, N Grimes 0-1, C Owens 0-1f.	Report	S McGinley 1-5 (0-3f), B Nugent 1-1, C Ryan 1-0, D Hagney 0-1, R Heneghan 0-1.

=== All-Ireland final ===
19 May 2024 Final	Kerry	1-14 - 1-20	Tyrone	Laois Hire O'Moore Park
	C Dillon 0-8 (1 mark, 3 frees), L Crowley 1-1 (pen), E Healy 0-2, D Kirby 0-1, E Boyle 0-1, P Lane 0-1.	Report	E McElholm 0-7, R Cassidy 0-5 (1 free), R McCullagh 0-5 (1 free), J Clarke 1-0, C Devlin 0-1, C Owens 0-1, O Brolly 0-1.	Referee: Paddy Neilan (Roscommon)

== Statistics ==
=== Top scorers ===
Overall

Rank	Player	County	Tally	Total	Matches	Average
1	Shane McGinley	Roscommon	4-31	43	5	8.60
2	Kieran McArdle	Louth	4-28	40	6	6.66
3	Cormac Dillon	Kerry	1-34	37	6	6.16
4	Orrin Jones	Tipperary	4-23	35	6	5.80
5	Oisín Doherty	Derry	3-25	34	7	4.85
6	Eoin McElholm	Tyrone	5-18	33	8	4.12
7	Jamie Murphy	Meath	3-23	32	6	5.33
8	Stephen Mooney	Monaghan	0-28	28	4	7.00
9	Paul Honeyman	Leitrim	1-21	24	4	6.00
9	Colm Costello	Galway	1-21	24	6	4.00

Single game

Rank	Player	Club	Tally	Total	Opposition
1	Orrin Jones	Tipperary	2-06	12	Waterford
1	Conor Owens	Tyrone	2-06	12	Antrim
3	Eoin McElholm	Tyrone	3-02	11	Antrim
3	Shane McGinley	Roscommon	1-08	11	Mayo
5	Kieran McArdle	Louth	1-07	10	Wicklow
5	Colm Costello	Galway	0-10	10	Leitrim
5	Stephen Mooney	Monaghan	0-10	10	Armagh
5	Paul Honeyman	Leitrim	0-10	10	Waterford
9	Kieran McArdle	Louth	2-03	9	Longford
9	John Brennan	Laois	2-03	9	Carlow
9	Shane McGinley	Roscommon	1-06	9	Galway
9	Shane McGinley	Roscommon	1-06	9	Leitrim
9	Darragh Lovett	Cavan	0-09	9	Donegal
