= U21FC =

U21HC stands for Under-21 Football Championship, which refers to a variety of events of the Gaelic Athletic Association which are now Under-20.

- All-Ireland Under-21 Football Championship
- Leinster Under-21 Football Championship
- Ulster Under-21 Football Championship
- Munster Under-21 Football Championship
- Connacht Under-21 Football Championship
