= 2023 All-Ireland Under-20 Football Championship =

Gaelic games tournament

Championship details
- Dates: 21 March – 13 May 2023
- Teams: 31

All-Ireland Champions
- Winning team: Kildare (3rd win)
- Captain: Harry O'Neill; Shane Farrell
- Manager: Brian Flanagan

All-Ireland Finalists
- Losing team: Sligo
- Captain: Canice Mulligan; Brian Byrne
- Manager: Paul Henry

Provincial Champions
- Munster: Kerry
- Leinster: Kildare
- Ulster: Down
- Connacht: Sligo

Championship statistics
- No. matches played: 40
- Goals total: 68 (1.70 per game)
- Points total: 840 (21.00 per game)
- Top Scorer: Luke Marren (0–31)
- Player of the Year: James McGrath

The 2023 All-Ireland Under-20 Football Championship was the fifth staging of the All-Ireland Under-20 Championship and the 60th staging overall of a Gaelic football championship for players between the minor and senior grades. The competition ran from 21 March to 13 May 2023.

The defending champion was Tyrone; however, the team was beaten by Down in the Ulster quarter-final.

The All-Ireland final was played at Kingspan Breffni Park in Cavan on 13 May 2023 between Kildare and Sligo, in what was their first ever championship meeting. Kildare won the match by 1–17 to 0–12 to claim a third All-Ireland title overall and a first title in five years.

Sligo's Luke Marren was the competition's top scorer with 0–31. Kildare's James McGrath was named U20 Footballer of the Year.

== Connacht Under-20 Football Championship ==
=== Connacht quarter-final ===
5 April 2023 Quarter-final	Roscommon	1-08 - 0-15	Sligo	Dr Hyde Park
	E Colleran 0-6 (4f), S McGinley 1-0, J Tumulty, C Hand 0-1 each.	Report	L Marren 0-10 (6f), J Donlon 0-2, C Mulligan, Ross Chambers, Ross Sloyan 0-1 each.	Referee: C Ryan (Galway)

=== Connacht semi-finals ===
4 April 2023 Semi-final	Galway	2-09 - 0-06	Leitrim	Tuam Stadium
	S Birmingham 0-3 (2f), J Slattery 0-3, M Moughan 1-0, M Thompson 1-0, S O’Neill 0-2, C Ó Curraoin 0-1.	Report	P Moran 0-3 (2f), J McGreal 0-1, R Oberwan 0-1, B Guckian 0-1.	Referee: J Gilmartin (Sligo)

12 April 2023 Semi-final	Mayo	1-09 - 0-17	Sligo	Connacht COE
	F Kelly (1-3); B Tuohy (0-2), D Hurley (0-2), T O’Flaherty (0-1), R Fadden (0-1).	Report	L Marren (0-4, 3fs), M Henry (0-4), D O’Boyle (0-2), Dylan Walsh (0-2, ‘45), R Sloyan (0-2); R Niland (0-2), Dillon Walsh (0-1).	Referee: M McGirl (Leitrim)

=== Connacht final ===
19 April 2023 Final	Galway	0-13 - 0-14	Sligo	Tuam Stadium
	C Ó Curraoin 0-6 (0-4, 0-1 ’45), J Slattery 0-3, M Thompson 0-1, C Power 0-1, S Birmingham 0-1f, M Mac Gearailt 0-1.	Report	L Marren 0-7 (0-4f), D O’Boyle 0-2, J Flynn 0-2, Dylan Walsh 0-1, Dillon Walsh 0-1, M Henry 0-1.	Referee: L Devenney (Mayo)

== Leinster Under-20 Football Championship ==
=== Group 1 ===
==== Table ====
Pos	Team	Pld	W	D	L	SF	SA	Diff	Pts	Qualification
1	Laois	3	3	0	0	48	38	10	6	Advance to semi-finals
2	Meath	3	2	0	1	39	23	16	4	Advance to quarter-finals
3	Longford	3	1	0	2	30	39	-9	2	
4	Carlow	3	0	0	3	26	43	-17	0	

==== Group 1 fixtures and results ====
21 March 2023 Round 1	Longford	0-04 - 0-12	Meath	Allen Park
	J Brady Hynes 0-2 (1f); Matthew Flynn, Michael Flynn (f) 0-1 each.	Report	E Frayne 0-6 (5f); O Keogh 0-3; C Caulfield 0-2; R Kinsella 0-1.	Referee: A Coyle (Westmeath)

21 March 2023 Round 1	Carlow	1-10 - 1-12	Laois	Netwatch Cullen Park
	E Byrne 1-2, B McMahon 0-4 (fs), E Corr 0-2, K Nolan, C Healy 0-1each.	Report	S Fitzpatrick 0-4, D Costello 1-1 (1-0 pen 1f), C Dunne 0-3 (1f), O Hooney 0-2, C Browne 0-1 (45), C Kelly 0-1(f).

28 March 2023 Round 2	Meath	2-11 - 0-04	Carlow	Ashbourne Grounds
	R Kinsella 2-2, E Frayne 0-3, J Kinlough 0-2, J Finnerty, S Leonard (m), S Emmanuel, O Keogh 0-1 each.	Report	B McMahon 0-3f, D Curran 0-1.

28 March 2023 Round 2	Laois	2-12 - 2-09	Longford	Laois Hire O'Moore Park
	D Costello 1-3, O Hooney 1-1, C Dunne 0-3 (one free), S Fitzpatrick, C Murphy, C Lee, C Heffernan, J Kelly 0-1 each.	Report	C Lynch 1-2, M Hynes 1-1, M Flynn 0-3, M Flynn 0-2 (one free), R Courtney 0-1.

4 April 2023 Round 3	Carlow	0-09 - 1-08	Longford	Netwatch Cullen Park
	B McMahon 0-6fs; K Nolan 0-2; J Phiri 0-1.	Report	M Hynes 1-0; M Flynn 0-2; J Brady Hynes 0-2fs; C Lynch, Matthew Flynn, B Lynn, J Walsh 0-1 each.	Referee: H Barrett

4 April 2023 Round 3	Laois	1-12 - 1-07	Meath	Laois Hire O'Moore Park
	D Costello 1-2 (two frees), D McEvoy 0-3 (one mark), C Dunne 0-2 (one mark), J Byrne 0-2, O Hooney 0-1, C Heffernan 0-1, C Brown 0-1 (one 45).	Report	E Frayne 0-3 (one free), O Keogh 1-0, J Kinlough 0-2, S Leonard 0-1, B O'Reilly 0-1.	Referee: J Foley (Carlow)

=== Group 2 ===
==== Table ====
Pos	Team	Pld	W	D	L	SF	SA	Diff	Pts	Qualification
1	Dublin	3	3	0	0	57	34	23	6	Advance to semi-finals
2	Louth	3	1	1	1	35	49	-14	3	Advance to quarter-finals
3	Wicklow	3	1	0	2	46	48	-2	2	
4	Offaly	3	0	1	2	35	42	-7	1	

==== Group 2 fixtures and results ====
21 March 2023 Round 1	Wicklow	3-06 - 1-14	Dublin	Baltinglass Grounds
	T Keogh 0-1, T Harrington 0-2, JP Nolan 0-2 (1f), S Doyle 2-0 (P), C Fee 0-1 (1f), J Kirwan 1-0.	Report	A Gavin 0-1, L Breathnach 0-4, E O' Connor Flanagan 0-1 E Dunne 1–0, T Brennan 0-2, J Quigley 0-2, D O'Leary 0-2, G McEneaney 0-1, C Dolan 0-1.

21 March 2023 Round 1	Louth	0-10 - 2-04	Offaly	Parnells Grounds
	K McArdle 0-4 (1m, 3f), S Reynolds 0-2, C Maher, H Butterly, D Dorian and L Flynn 0-1 each.	Report	J Furlong and A Egan 1-0 each, H Plunkett 0-3 (3f), G O’Meara 0-1.

28 March 2023 Round 2	Dublin	2-16 - 0-07	Louth	Parnell Park
	L Breathnach 0-6 (2 marks, 1f), J Quigley 1-1 (1-0pen, 0-1f), D Dempsey (1f, 1 mark), T Brennan 0-3 each, C Moriarty 1-0, C Dolan, G McEneaney, S Smith 0-1 apiece.	Report	K McElroy (2f), K McArdle (2f) 0-2 each, H Butterly (‘45’), D McDonnell, C Maher 0-1 each.	Referee: K O'Brien (Westmeath)

28 March 2023 Round 2	Offaly	1-10 - 2-08	Wicklow	Faithful Fields
	J Guing (0-9, 4f, 2m, 1 45), C Egan (1-0), G O’Meara (0-1, f).	Report	T Keogh (1-2, 1f, 1 pen), J Prendergast (1-0), JP Nolan (0-3, 2f), L O’Neill (0-1), T Harrington (0-1), J Reid (0-1).

4 April 2023 Round 3	Louth	2-12 - 2-11	Wicklow	Parnells Grounds
	S Reynolds 2-3 (1m), K McArdle 0-4 (3f), B Corrigan, L Flynn, C Taaffe, T McDonnell and H Butterly 0-1 each.	Report	J Prendergast 1-2, D Cooney 1-0, C Fee (1f), T Keogh and JP Nolan 0-2 each, T Harrington, L O’Neill, and J Boland 0-1 each	Referee: P Coyle (Meath)

4 April 2023 Round 3	Offaly	1-09 - 1-15	Dublin	Faithful Fields
	H Plunkett 0-4 (3f), G O'Meara 0-3 (2f), J Furlong 1-0, N Furlong and J Guing 0-1 each.	Report	R Keogh 0-4 (3f), G McEneaney 1-0, D Dempsey 0-3 (1m), L Breatnach and L Ward 0-2 each, D O'Leary, E Dunne, K O'Brien and C Dolan 0-1 each.

=== Group 3 ===
==== Table ====
Pos	Team	Pld	W	D	L	SF	SA	Diff	Pts	Qualification
1	Westmeath	2	2	0	0	35	22	13	4	Advance to quarter-finals
2	Kildare	2	1	0	1	26	24	2	2	Advance to quarter-finals
3	Wexford	2	0	0	2	20	35	-15	0	

==== Group 3 fixtures ====
21 March 2023 Round 1	Kildare	0-10 - 2-10	Westmeath	Manguard Plus Kildare COE
	S Farrell 0-5fs, A Fanning 0-2 (1m), K Cummins 0-1f, C Bolton 0-1, R Sinkey 0-1	Report	M Whittaker 1-3, B Cooney 1-1, S Baker 0-3fs, S Hanley 0-1, T Kelleher 0-1, S Corcoran 0-1

28 March 2023 Round 2	Wexford	0-08 - 0-16	Kildare	Chadwicks Wexford Park
	R Fitzpatrick 0-3 frees; L Doyle, C Hughes, M Ellis, A Mahoney (f), B Peare, 0-1 each.	Report	S Farrell (4f) 0-5; R Sinkey (2f) 0-4; N Dolan 0-3; O O'Sullivan, C Dalton, A Fanning, F Cooke 0-1 each.

4 April 2023 Round 3	Westmeath	1-16 - 1-09	Wexford	Lakepoint Park
	S Baker 0-6 (4f), M Whittaker 0-5, B Cooney 1-1, D Scahill, D McCartan, S Corcoran (m), P Pierson 0-1 each.	Report	R Fitzpatrick 0-5 (3f), M Ellis 1-1, C Hughes, B Peare, S Hughes 0-1 each.	Referee: D Stynes (Dublin)

=== Leinster quarter-finals ===
11 April 2023 Quarter-final	Meath	0-08 - 1-03	Westmeath	Ashbourne Grounds
	E Frayne 0-4, C Caulfield 0-3, S Leonard 0-1.	Report	S Baker 1-1, J Geoghegan 0-1, D Murtagh 0-1.	Referee: D Byrne

11 April 2023 Quarter-final	Louth	1-06 - 0-12	Kildare	Parnells Grounds
	K McElroy 1-1 (1f), K McArdle 0-2 (2f) H Butterly and S Callaghan 0-1 each.	Report	S Farrell (2f) and C Bolton 0-3 each, R Sinkey (2f) and E Cully 0-2 each, C Dalton 0-1.	Referee: D Hickey (Carlow)

=== Leinster semi-finals ===
18 April 2023 Semi-final	Meath	0-10 - 0-14	Dublin	Páirc Tailteann
	E Frayne (0-5, 4 frees, 1 mark); S Leonard, C Gray, J Kinlough, C Smith, H Corcoran (0-1 each).	Report	R Keogh (0-5, 4 frees); J Quigley (0-3, 2 frees); C Dolan (0-2); D Dempsey (1 free), L Breathnach, E Dunne, S Smith (0-1 each).	Referee: D Hickey (Carlow)

18 April 2023 Semi-final	Laois	0-09 - 1-20	Kildare	Laois Hire O'Moore Park
	D McEvoy 0-3f, J Byrne 0-2, C Dunne 0-2 (0-1f), B Dempsey 0-1, D Costello 0-1.	Report	E Cully 1-5, R Sinkey 0-4, A Fanning 0-3, S Farrell 0-3 (0-1f), C Dalton 0-1, C Bolton 0-1, K Browne 0-1, O O’Sullivan 0-1, J Harris 0-1.	Referee: E O'Connor (Offaly)

=== Leinster final ===
25 April 2023 Final	Dublin	0-13 - 0-16 (aet)	Kildare	Netwatch Cullen Park
	J Quigley (0-5, 3 frees); R Keogh (0-4, 3 frees); L Ward, G McEneaney, S Smith, B Costello (0-1).	Report	R Sinkey (0-4); C Dalton (0-3); S Farrell (2 frees), C Bolton, A Fanning, O O'Sullivan (0-2); C Barker (0-1, 1 free).	Referee: A Coyne (Westmeath)

== Munster Under-20 Football Championship ==
=== Munster quarter-finals ===
10 April 2023 Quarter-final	Limerick	2-06 - 0-06	Waterford	Mick Neville Park
	D O’Shaughnessy 1-3 (0-1 free, 0-1 mark, 0-1 ‘45’); A Neville 1-0; R Quirke, D Murray (free), E Rigter 0-1 each.	Report	A Dunwoody 0-4 (0-3 frees); R Fennell 0-2.	Referee: B Fleming (Kerry)

10 April 2023 Quarter-final	Tipperary	0-11 - 1-11	Clare	FBD Semple Stadium
	C Smith 0-5,4fs; J Lawrence, D Hogan(f), R Collins, N O Connor, T O Connor, D McVicker 0-1 each.	Report	M Kelleher 1-2; T Collins 0-3,3fs; T Curran 0-3,1f; B Rouine 0-2; S McMahon 0-1.	Referee: J Ryan (Cork)

=== Munster semi-finals ===
17 April 2023 Semi-final	Cork	2-14 - 0-06	Limerick	Páirc Uí Chaoimh
	H O’Connor 1-2, 1f, N Kelly 1-1, O Corcoran 0-4, 1f, R O’Sullivan and R Corkery 0-2 each, T Walsh, S Dore, L O’Connell 0-1 each.	Report	D O’Shaughnessy 0-4f, D Ryan and D Murray 0-1f each.	Referee: N Quinn (Clare)

17 April 2023 Semi-final	Kerry	1-20 - 4-09 (aet)	Clare	Austin Stack Park
	W Shine (0-10, 0-5 frees); R Monahan (0-5, 0-1 ‘45); K Evans (1-1); A O’Shea (0-3, 0-1 mark); C McMahon (0-1).	Report	P Frawley (2-0); B Rouine (0-4, 0-2 frees, 0-1 mark); B McNamara (1-1); J Rafferty (1-0); T Curran (0-1 free), C McGroary (0-2 each).	Referee: J Hayes (Limerick)

=== Munster final ===
24 April 2023 Final	Cork	1-06 - 2-12	Kerry	Páirc Uí Chaoimh
	N Kelly (1-2); H O’Connor (0-3 frees); P O’Driscoll (0-1).	Report	W Shine (0-6, 0-2 frees); C Burke, C McMahon (1-0); K Evans, L Crowley (0-2 each); J Nagle, A O’Shea (0-1 each).	Referee: J Hayes (Limerick)

== Ulster Under-20 Football Championship ==
=== Ulster preliminary round ===
25 March 2023 Preliminary round	Monaghan	0-09 - 0-07	Armagh	St Mary's Park
	C Conlon 0-3, S Mooney 0-3, D Byrne 0-1, C Reilly 0-1, McConnell 0-1.		A O'Neill 0-2, O Conaty 0-1, F O'Brien 0-1, S Conlon 0-1, D McMullen 0-1, B O'Hagan 0-1.

=== Ulster quarter-finals ===
29 March 2023 Quarter-final	Fermanagh	0-08 - 3-12	Derry	Brewster Park
	C O’Hanlon 0-2 (2f), J McDade 0-2 (2m), D McCann 0-2 (1f), C Leonard 0-1, C O’Brien 0-1.	Report	M Downey 1-6 (1-0pen, 4f), R Forbes 1-1, L Murray 1-1, N O’Donnell 0-2, C Diamond 0-2 (1f).

29 March 2023 Quarter-final	Tyrone	1-08 - 2-09	Down	O'Neill's Healy Park
	E McElholm 1-0, R Canavan (2f), C Cush (1’ 45) 0-2 each, O Miller (m), R Cassidy, G Potter, O Gormley 0-1 each.	Report	O Savage 1-4 (0-3f), J Morgan 1-0, C Rodgers 0-2, O Cunningham, O Treacy (f), E Lougharn 0-1 each.

29 March 2023 Quarter-final	Cavan	0-13 - 1-11	Monaghan	Kingspan Breffni Park
	D Madden 0-7 (5f), D Lovett 0-3, S Tynan 0-2 C McKeogh 0-1.	Report	S Mooney 1-4 (1-0pen, 3f, 1m), C Conlon (1’45) and R Duffy 0-2 each, M Hamill, C Eccles and M McPhillips 0-1 each.

29 March 2023 Quarter-final	Donegal	0-15 - 0-15; Penalties: 5-4	Antrim	MacCumhaill Park
	D Boyle (5f) 0-7; S Ward (2f, 1 '45) 0-3; C O'Neill (1f), B McGarvey 0-2 each; C Mulligan 0-1.	Report	R McQuillan (4f) 0-8; C Johnson (1f) 0-2; C Hand, E Quinn, R McKillop, N Fallon. C Higgins 0-1 each.

=== Ulster semi-finals ===
8 April 2023 Semi-final	Derry	0-11 - 0-05	Donegal	Owenbeg COE
	P McCullagh 0-4, C Diamond 0-3, M Downey 0-2, D Gilmore 0-1, P McGurk 0-1.

12 April 2023 Semi-final	Down	1-17 - 1-09	Monaghan	Páirc Esler
	O Savage 1-7 (5f), J Doran 0-4, O Murdock and J Morgan 0-2 each, E Lougran and H Magill 0-1 each	Report	S Mooney 1-4 (3f, 1m), C Conlon (f), N Rice, D McCahey, C Eccles and D Byrne 0-1 each	Referee: S Murphy (Armagh)

=== Ulster final ===
26 April 2023 Final	Derry	0-09 - 2-11	Down	Box-It Athletic Grounds
	C Diamond 0-3 (2f), M Doherty 0-2, N O’Donnell, P McCullagh, J McDermott and M Downey 0-1 each.	Report	O Savage 0-8 (5f, 1m), O Murdock and J Doran 1-1, each, C Rodgers 0-1.	Referee: P Clarke (Cavan)

== All-Ireland Under-20 Football Championship ==
=== All-Ireland semi-finals ===
6 May 2023 Semi-final	Sligo	1-08 - 0-09	Kerry	Pearse Stadium
	R Niland 1-1, L Marren 0-3f, J Donlon 0-1m, D Walsh 0-1 ’45, D O’Boyle 0-1, B Byrne 0-1.	Report	W Shine 0-4 (0-3f), R Monahan 0-2, L Crowley 0-1, K Evans 0-1, C McMahon 0-1.	Referee: K Eannetta (Tyrone)

6 May 2023 Semi-final	Kildare	1-11 - 2-07	Down	Parnell Park
	O O’Sullivan 1-1, S Farrell 0-4 (2f), E Cully 0-2, N Dolan (f), A Fanning, S Hanafin and J McKevitt 0-1 each.	Report	J Morgan 2-1 (1m), O Savage (2f) and O Treacy (1f. 1'45) 0-2 each, T McCarroll and O Murdock 0-1 each.

=== All-Ireland final ===
13 May 2023 Final	Sligo	0-12 - 1-17	Kildare	Kingspan Breffni Park
	L Marren 0-7, B Byrne 0-2, J Donlon 0-1, D O'Boyle 0-1, D Walsh 0-1.		K Browan 1-1, O O'Sullivan 0-4, C Bolton 0-2, F Cook 0-2, A Fanning 0-2, C Baker 0-1, N Dolan 0-1, T von Engelbrechten 0-1, R Sinkey 0-1, H O'Neill 0-1, S Farrell 0-1.

== Statistics ==
=== Top scorers ===
Top scorers overall

Rank	Player	County	Tally	Total	Matches	Average
1	Luke Marren	Sligo	0-31	31	5	6.20
2	Oisín Savage	Down	2-21	27	4	6.75
3	Shane Farrell	Kildare	0-23	23	7	3.28
4	Eoghan Frayne	Meath	0-21	21	5	4.20
5	William Shine	Kerry	0-20	20	3	6.66
6	Stephen Mooney	Monaghan	2-11	17	3	5.66
7	Davy Costello	Laois	3-07	16	4	4.00
7	Ryan Sinkey	Kildare	0-16	16	7	2.28
9	Joe Quigley	Dublin	1-11	14	4	3.50
10	Senan Baker	Westmeath	1-10	13	3	4.33
10	Bryan McMahon	Carlow	0-13	13	3	4.33
10	Luke Breathnach	Dublin	0-13	13	4	3.25
10	Ross Keogh	Dublin	0-13	13	5	2.60

In a single game

Rank	Player	County	Tally	Total	Opposition
1	Oisín Savage	Down	1-07	10	Monaghan
1	Luke Marren	Sligo	0-10	10	Roscommon
1	William Shine	Kerry	0-10	10	Clare
4	Seán Reynolds	Louth	2-03	9	Wicklow
4	Matthew Downey	Derry	1-06	9	Fermanagh
4	Jamie Guing	Offaly	0-09	9	Wicklow
7	Ruairí Kinsella	Meath	2-02	8	Carlow
7	Eoin Cully	Kildare	1-05	8	Laois
7	Ryan McQuillan	Antrim	0-08	8	Donegal
7	Oisín Savage	Down	0-08	8	Derry

=== Miscellaneous ===
- Sligo retained the Connacht Championship for the first time in their history.
