= 2008 All-Ireland Under-21 Football Championship =

Gaelic football competition

Championship details

All-Ireland Champions
- Winning team: Kerry (10th win)
- Captain: Killian Young
- Manager: Seán Geaney

All-Ireland Finalists
- Losing team: Kildare
- Captain: Gary Whyte
- Manager: Glenn Ryan

Provincial Champions
- Munster: Kerry
- Leinster: Kildare
- Ulster: Down
- Connacht: Mayo

The 2008 All-Ireland Under-21 Football Championship was the 45th staging of the All-Ireland Under-21 Football Championship since its establishment by the Gaelic Athletic Association in 1964.

Cork entered the championship as defending champions, however, they were defeated by Kerry in the Munster semi-final.

On 3 May 2008, Kerry won the championship following a 2-12 to 0-11 defeat of Kildare in the All-Ireland final. This was their 10th All-Ireland title overall and their first in ten championship seasons.

== Results ==
=== All-Ireland Under-21 Football Championship ===
Semi-finals

19 April 2008 Semi-final	Kildare	1-10 - 0-10	Down	Páirc Tailteann, Navan

19 April 2008 Semi-final	Kerry	1-09 - 1-07	Mayo	MacDonagh Park, Nenagh

Final

3 May 2008 Final	Kerry	2-12 - 0-11	Kildare	Semple Stadium, Thurles

== Statistics ==
=== Miscellaneous ===
- Kildare and Down meet for the first time in the championship since 1965.
