= Ruairí Canavan =

Gaelic footballer

Personal information
- Native name: Ruairí Ó Ceannubháin (Irish)
- Born: 2003 (age 22–23)

Sport
- Sport: Gaelic football
- Position: Forward
Club
- Years: Club
- 2021–: Errigal Ciarán
Club titles
- Tyrone titles: 2
- Ulster titles: 1
College
- Years: College
- Ulster University
College titles
- Sigerson titles: 1
Inter-county
- Years: County
- 2022–: Tyrone
Inter-county titles
- Ulster titles: 0
- All-Irelands: 0
- All Stars: 0

Ruairí Canavan (born 2003) is a Gaelic footballer who plays for Errigal Ciarán and the Tyrone county team. His father, Peter Canavan, is a former All-Ireland winning captain with Tyrone, and his brother Darragh is also an inter-county footballer.

== Playing career ==
=== University ===
In his studies at Ulster University, Canavan established himself on their senior football team. Ulster faced UCD in the final of the Sigerson Cup on 14 February 2024. Canavan kicked four points Ulster won the cup for the first time in sixteen years.

=== Club ===
Canavan made his Tyrone Senior Football Championship debut on 10 October 2021. He scored five points from the bench in a twelve-point win over Clonoe.

On 30 October 2022, Canavan played in his first county final, with Errigal Ciarán facing Carrickmore. Errigal won the match by 2–11 to 1–12, with Canavan scoring two points.

Errigal Ciarán reached the county final again in 2023, this time against Trillick. Canavan scored a point from a free, but Trillick won the final by three points after extra-time. The two sides met in the county final for the second year in a row in 2024. Canavan top-scored with six points to help Errigal to a 0–12 to 1–8 win. Canavan also received the man of the match award, as well as finishing as the championship's top scorer. Errigal went on to reach the final of the Ulster Senior Club Football Championship, with Canavan kicking nine points in the semi-final against Clann Éireann. Errigal went on to win the final, beating Kilcoo by a point to win the championship for the first time since 2002.

=== Inter-county ===
==== Minor and under-20 ====
On 14 July 2019, the Tyrone minor team faced Monaghan in the Ulster final. Canavan came on as a second-half substitute as Monaghan won the match by two points.

On 22 April 2022, Canavan was in the half-forward line as the Tyrone under-20 team faced Cavan in the Ulster final. Canavan kicked seven points from placed balls, including a sideline. Tyrone held on to win the match by 0–11 to 0–10, with Canavan being named man of the match. Canavan put in another man of the match performance on 8 May, scoring 0–8 in the All-Ireland semi-final win over Kerry. On 14 May Tyrone faced Kildare in the All-Ireland final. Canavan was once again the hero, scoring 1–7 as Tyrone were crowned All-Ireland champions with a six-point win. Canavan was named U20 Footballer of the Year for his performances in the championship.

Canavan was named captain of the under-20 team for the 2023 season. Tyrone suffered an early championship exit, losing to Down in the first round.

==== Senior ====
Canavan joined the Tyrone senior panel after the All-Ireland Under-20 win in May 2022.

On 19 February 2023, Canavan made his National League debut as a late sub in a loss to Galway. Canavan scored his first point for Tyrone the next week, as Tyrone suffered a heavy loss to Mayo. Canavan made his senior championship debut on 16 April, coming on as a late substitute in an Ulster quarter-final loss to Monaghan. Canavan's first start was on 18 June, scoring three points in a draw against Westmeath. In the All-Ireland preliminary quarter-final against Donegal, Canavan scored his first goal, finishing with 1–1 in an eight-point win for Tyrone. Kerry ended Tyrone's season at the quarter-final stage.

== Honours ==
Tyrone

- All-Ireland Under-20 Football Championship: 2022
- Ulster Under-20 Football Championship: 2022

Errigal Ciarán

- Ulster Senior Club Football Championship: 2024
- Tyrone Senior Football Championship: 2022, 2024

Ulster University

- Sigerson Cup: 2024

Individual

- Eirgrid Under-20 Footballer of the Year: 2022
- Eirgrid 20 Under-20 Award: 2022

Awards
Preceded by Jack Bryant (Offaly)	Eirgrid Under-20 Footballer of the Year; 2022	Succeeded by James McGrath (Kildare)
