= 2017 All-Ireland Under-21 Football Championship =

Gaelic football competition

Championship details
- Dates: 22 February – 29 April 2017
- Teams: 31

All-Ireland Champions
- Winning team: Dublin (5th win)
- Captain: Cillian O'Shea; Con O'Callaghan
- Manager: Dessie Farrell

All-Ireland Finalists
- Losing team: Galway
- Captain: Michael Daly
- Manager: Gerry Fahy

Provincial Champions
- Munster: Kerry
- Leinster: Dublin
- Ulster: Donegal
- Connacht: Galway

Championship statistics
- Player of the Year: Aaron Byrne

The 2017 All-Ireland Under 21 Football Championship was an inter-county gaelic football competition between 31 of the 32 counties of Ireland (Kilkenny did not participate). Provincial championships were held in Connacht, Leinster, Munster and Ulster with the winners progressing to the All-Ireland semi-finals.

This was the final year of the Under 21 football championship. Beginning in 2018, it was replaced by an Under 20 championship following a vote at the GAA congress on 26 February 2016.

Dublin beat Galway by 2-13 to 2-7 in the final on 29 April.

The competition was sponsored for the third time by EirGrid.

== 2017 Connacht Under-21 Football Championship ==
=== Quarter-final ===
- Galway 4-10 Leitrim 2-12 (11 March)

=== Semi-finals ===
22 March 2017; 7:00 pm Semi-final	Sligo	1-13 - 0-13	Roscommon	Kiltoom; Referee: Jerome Henry (Mayo); Man of the Match: Darragh Cummins
22 March 2017; 7:00 pm Semi-final	Jodie O’Reilly 1-1, Paddy O’Connor (0-4f) and Darragh Cummins 0-4 each, Liam Gaughan, Stephen Connolly, Jason Perry, Sean Carrbine 0-1 each	Report	Hubert Darcy 0-5f, Cian McKeon 0-4 (0-3f), Shane Mannion (0-1f), John Gannon, Jamie Fahy, Brian Kelly 0-1 each	Kiltoom; Referee: Jerome Henry (Mayo); Man of the Match: Darragh Cummins

25 March 2017; 7:00 pm Semi-final	Galway	2-13 - 1-10	Mayo	Tuam; Referee: John Gilmartin (Sligo); Man of the Match: Peter Cooke
25 March 2017; 7:00 pm Semi-final	Paul Mannion 0-4, Dessie Conneely and Eoin Finnerty 1-0 each, Peter Cooke 0-3 (0-2f, 1 '45), Robert Finnerty (0-1f) and Michael Daly 0-2 each, Cillian McDaid and Colin Brady 0-1 each	Report	Brian Reape 1-6 (0-5f), Matthew Flanagan (1 '45), Mike Murray, James Lyons, Matthew Ruane 0-1 each	Tuam; Referee: John Gilmartin (Sligo); Man of the Match: Peter Cooke

=== Final ===
1 April 2017; 18:00; Final	Sligo	2-14 - 3-20 AET	Galway	Markievicz Park; Referee: Paddy Neilan (Roscommon); Man of the Match: Cillian McDaid
1 April 2017; 18:00; Final	Kyle Cawley 1-2 (1-0 pen), Alan McLoughlin 1-2, Patrick O’Connor 0-5 (0-3f), Liam Gaughan 0-4 (0-2f), Jason Perry 0-1	Report	Sean Kelly 2-1, Rob Finnerty 0-6 (0-4f), Michael Daly 1-2, Cillian McDaid 0-3, Cein D’Arcy 0-3, Peter Cooke 0-2 (0-1f), Colin Brady, Antaine O Laoi, Eoin Finnerty 0-1 each	Markievicz Park; Referee: Paddy Neilan (Roscommon); Man of the Match: Cillian McDaid

== 2017 Leinster Under-21 Football Championship ==
=== Preliminary round ===
- Meath 0-12 Westmeath 2-8 (22 February)
- Wicklow 0-9 Louth 1-13 (1 March)
- Carlow 0-8 Wexford 1-18 (22 February)

=== Quarter-finals ===
- Dublin 2-14 Westmeath 0-6 (1 March)
- Kildare 0-10 Longford 2-6 (1 March)
- Wexford 0-6 Offaly 1-6 (1 March)
- Laois 2-13 Louth 1-8 (8 March)

=== Semi-finals ===
15 March 2017; 7:00 pm Semi-final	Offaly	2-9 - 2-8	Laois	Dr. Cullen Park; Referee: Brendan Cawley (Kildare)
15 March 2017; 7:00 pm Semi-final	Ciaran Farrell 1-1, Adam Mahon 1-0, Shane Tierney 0-3 (0-1f), Jordan Hayes (0-1f) and Paddy Dunican 0-2 each, Jack Walsh 0-1	Report	Sean Moore 1-6 (0-6f, 1-0 pen), Colm Murphy 1-1, Tom Shiel 0-1	Dr. Cullen Park; Referee: Brendan Cawley (Kildare)

22 March 2017; 7:00 pm Semi-final	Dublin	2-10 - 0-9	Longford	Lakepoint Park, Mullingar; Referee: Niall Ward (Westmeath); Man of the Match: Con O'Callaghan
22 March 2017; 7:00 pm Semi-final	Con O’Callaghan 2-5 (0-3f), Chris Sallier 0-3, Brian Howard and Stephen Smith 0-1 each	Report	David McGivney 0-4 (0-3f), Rian Brady 0-2 (0-1f), Darragh Doherty, Aidan McElligott, Dessie Reynolds 0-1 each	Lakepoint Park, Mullingar; Referee: Niall Ward (Westmeath); Man of the Match: Con O'Callaghan

=== Final ===
29 March 2017; 19:30; Final	Dublin	2-14 - 0-8	Offaly	O'Moore Park; Attendance: 2,055; Referee: David Hickey (Carlow); Man of the Match: Aaron Byrne (Na Fianna)
29 March 2017; 19:30; Final	Tom Fox 1-2, Aaron Byrne (1 '45) and Con O'Callaghan (0-2f) 0-4 each, Stephen Smith 1-0, Glenn O'Reilly 0-2, Eoin Murchan and Chris Sallier 0-1 each	Report	Shane Tierney 0-4 (0-1f), Jordan Hayes 0-3 (0-2f), Ronan McEvoy 0-1	O'Moore Park; Attendance: 2,055; Referee: David Hickey (Carlow); Man of the Match: Aaron Byrne (Na Fianna)

== 2017 Munster Under-21 Football Championship ==
=== Quarter-finals ===
- Kerry 1-17 Clare 2-8 (8 March)
- Limerick 0-16 Tipperary 0-14 (8 March)

=== Semi-finals ===
15 March 2017; 7:00 pm Semi-final	Cork	2-10 - 0-10	Limerick	Páirc Uí Rinn; Referee: Rory Hickey (Clare)
15 March 2017; 7:00 pm Semi-final	Michael Hurley 1-3, Brian Coakley 0-4 (0-2f), Michael Dineen 1-0, Stephen Sherlock 0-2 (0-1f), Gary Murphy 0-1	Report	Hugh Bourke 0-5f, Brian Donovan 0-2, Richard Hayes (0-1f), Kieran Daly, AJ O’Connor 0-1 each	Páirc Uí Rinn; Referee: Rory Hickey (Clare)

15 March 2017; 7:00 pm Semi-final	Waterford	0-7 - 1-18	Kerry	Fraher Field, Dungarvan; Referee: Sean Lonergan (Tipperary)
15 March 2017; 7:00 pm Semi-final	David Looby 0-3 (0-2f, 1 '45), Edmund O’Halloran, Conor Gleeson, Conor Murray, Joe Allen (f) 0-1 each	Report	Killian Spillane 1-6 (0-3f), Cathal Bambury 0-5, Sean O’Shea 0-3 (0-1f), Tom O’Sullivan 0-2, Andrew Barry and Matthew Flaherty 0-1 each	Fraher Field, Dungarvan; Referee: Sean Lonergan (Tipperary)

=== Final ===
29 March 2017; 19:30; Final	Kerry	2-16 - 0-6	Cork	Pairc Ui Rinn; Attendance: 3,861; Referee: Alan Kissane (Waterford); Man of the Match: Andrew Barry
29 March 2017; 19:30; Final	Sean O’Shea 0-6 (0-3f, 0-1 45’), Killian Spillane 0-5 (0-2f), Conor Geaney 1-2 (0-1f), Matthew O’Sullivan 1-1, Tom O’Sullivan, Cathal Bambury 0-1 each	Report	Stephen Sherlock (0-2f), Brian Coakley (0-1f) 0-2 each, Sean O’Donoghue (0-1f), Gary Murphy 0-1 each	Pairc Ui Rinn; Attendance: 3,861; Referee: Alan Kissane (Waterford); Man of the Match: Andrew Barry

== 2017 Ulster Under-21 Football Championship ==
=== Preliminary round ===
- Monaghan 2-16 Antrim 0-16 (8 March)

=== Quarter-finals ===
- Armagh 2-13 Down 0-12 (15 March)
- Cavan 2-19 Fermanagh 0-4 (15 March)
- Derry 3-10 Monaghan 1-11 (15 March)
- Tyrone 0-14 Donegal 0-14 (after extra-time, 15 March)
- Donegal 0-18 Tyrone 1-9 (Replay, 22 March)

=== Semi-finals ===
5 April 2017; 7:00 pm Semi-final	Donegal	3-17 - 0-13	Cavan	Brewster Park; Referee: S Laverty (Antrim)
5 April 2017; 7:00 pm Semi-final	Lorcan Connors 0-6 (0-5f), Michael Carroll 1-2, Stephen McBrearty 0-4, Cian Mulligan 1-1, Michael Langan 0-3 (0-1f), Caolan McGonigle 1-0, Niall O’Donnell 0-1	Report	Caoimhin O’Reilly 0-5f, Ryan Connolly 0-4 (0-3f), Sean O’Connor, Conor Bradley, Bryan Magee, David Brady 0-1 each	Brewster Park; Referee: S Laverty (Antrim)

5 April 2017; 7:00 pm Semi-final	Derry	0-21 - 1-15	Armagh	Celtic Park; Referee: Niall Cullen (Fermanagh)
5 April 2017; 7:00 pm Semi-final	Danny Tallon 0-8 (0-4f), Shane McGuigan 0-6 (0-5f), Peter Hagan 0-3, Patrick Kearney 0-2, Dean Curran and Eamonn McGill 0-1	Report	Oisin O’Neill 1-5 (0-3f), Rian O’Neill (0-1f), Thomas O’Kane, Shea Loye (0-2f) 0-2 each, Caolan McConville, Shea Hoey, Callum O’Neill, Steven Morris 0-1 each	Celtic Park; Referee: Niall Cullen (Fermanagh)

=== Final ===
10 April; Final	Derry	0-13 – 3-17	Donegal	Athletic Grounds; Attendance: 3,521; Referee: Sean Hurson (Tyrone); Man of the Match: Jamie Brennan
10 April; Final	Danny Tallon 0-3f, Shane McGuigan 0-2 (0-1f), Peter Hagan 0-2 (0-1f), Patrick Coney, Conor Doherty, Jack Doherty, Cathal Mulholland, Jordan Curran, Niall Keenan 0-1 each	Report	Lorcan Connors 1-5 (0-5f), Michael Carroll 1-2, Ethan O’Donnell 1-0, Michael Langan 0-3 (2 '45, 0-1f), Jason McGee 0-2, Jamie Brennan, Cian Mulligan, Niall O’Donnell, Conor Morrison, Eoghan Ban Gallagher 0-1 each	Athletic Grounds; Attendance: 3,521; Referee: Sean Hurson (Tyrone); Man of the Match: Jamie Brennan

== All-Ireland ==
=== Semi-finals ===
15 April 2017; 2:30 pm Semi-final	Dublin	1-13 - 0-9	Donegal	Breffni Park, Cavan; Referee: James Bermingham (Cork); Man of the Match: Brian Howard
15 April 2017; 2:30 pm Semi-final	Aaron Byrne 0-4 (0-2f), Sean McMahon 1-0, Glenn O’Reilly and Cian Murphy 0-2 each, Chris Sallier, Andrew McGowan, Darren Byrne, Tom Fox, Con O’Callaghan (0-1f) 0-1 each	Report	Michael Langan 0-4 (0-2f), Niall O’Donnell 0-2, Michael Carroll, Stephen McBrearty, Ethan O’Donnell 0-1 each	Breffni Park, Cavan; Referee: James Bermingham (Cork); Man of the Match: Brian Howard

15 April 2017; 4:30 pm Semi-final	Kerry	2-10 - 2-14	Galway	Cusack Park, Ennis; Referee: Brendan Cawley (Sligo)
15 April 2017; 4:30 pm Semi-final	Killian Spillane 0-4 (0-3f), Jordan Kiely and Matthew O’Sullivan 1-0 each, Shane Ryan (0-1f and 1 '45) and Matthew Flaherty 0-2 each, Sean O’Shea and Conor Geaney (0-1f) each	Report	Peter Cooke 0-5 (0-3f), Dessie Conneely and Colin Brady 1-0 each, Sean Kelly and Michael Daly 0-2 each, Kieran Molloy, Robert Finnerty, Paul Mannion, Cillian McDaid, Céin D’Arcy 0-1 each	Cusack Park, Ennis; Referee: Brendan Cawley (Sligo)

=== Final ===
29 April; 5:00 pm Final	Dublin	2-13 - 2-7	Galway	O'Connor Park, Tullamore; Referee: Ciaran Branagan (Down); Man of the Match: Darren Gavin
29 April; 5:00 pm Final	Con O’Callaghan 1-3 (0-2f, 0-1 pen), Aaron Byrne 1-0, Glenn O’Reilly 0-3, Colm Basquel and Dan O’Brien 0-2 each, Brian Howard, Darren Gavin, Paddy Small 0-1 each	Report	Cillian McDaid 1-1, Colm Brennan 1-0, Kieran Molloy, Peter Cooke (0-1f), Michael Daly, Paul Mannion, Eoin Finnerty, Colin Brady 0-1 each	O'Connor Park, Tullamore; Referee: Ciaran Branagan (Down); Man of the Match: Darren Gavin
