= 2022 All-Ireland Under-20 Football Championship =

5th staging of the All-Ireland Under-20 Football Championship

Championship details
- Dates: 25 March – 14 May 2022
- Teams: 31

All-Ireland Champions
- Winning team: Tyrone (6th win)
- Captain: Niall Devlin
- Manager: Paul Devlin

All-Ireland Finalists
- Losing team: Kildare
- Captain: Aaron Browne
- Manager: Brian Flanagan

Provincial Champions
- Munster: Kerry
- Leinster: Kildare
- Ulster: Tyrone
- Connacht: Sligo

Championship statistics
- No. matches played: 30
- Goals total: 71 (2.37 per game)
- Points total: 656 (21.87 per game)
- Top Scorer: Ruairí Canavan (1–34)
- Player of the Year: Ruairí Canavan

The 2022 All-Ireland Under-20 Football Championship was the fifth staging of the All-Ireland Under-20 Championship and the 59th staging overall of a Gaelic football championship for players between the minor and senior grades. The competition began on 25 March and ended on 14 May 2022.

The defending champion was Offaly; however, the team was beaten by Kildare in the Leinster semi-final.

The final took place on 14 May 2022, between Kildare and Tyrone. Tyrone won the match by 1–20 to 1–14 to win a sixth title and a first since 2015.

Tyrone's Ruairí Canavan was the competition's top scorer with 1–34. Canavan was also named U20 Footballer of the Year.

== Connacht Under-20 Football Championship ==
=== Quarter-final ===
6 April 2022 Quarter-final	Mayo	1–6 (9) – (7) 1–4	Galway	Bekan
	Jack Fallon 1–0, Frank Irwin 0–2 (0–1f), Cian O'Connell 0–2, Bob Tuohy 0–1, Paddy Heneghan 0–1	Report	James McLoughlin 1–0, Nathan Grainger 0–2 (0–1f, 0–1 '45), Dylan Brady 0–1, Daniel O'Flaherty 0–1	Stadium: Connacht GAA Centre of Excellence; Referee: Michael McGirl

=== Semi-finals ===
13 April 2022 Semi-final	Leitrim	2–9 (15) – (16) 0–16	Mayo	Carrick-on-Shannon
	Jack Casey 1–1, Michael McKiernan 0–3 (0–1f), Conor Quinn 1–0, Fergal McLoughlin 0–2, Oisin Curley 0–1, Eoin McLoughlin 0–1, Paul Moran 0–1	Report	Frank Irwin 0–6 (0–4f, 0–1 '45), Cian McHale 0–2 (0–2f), Cian McConnell 0–2 (0–1), Fenton Kelly 0–1, Sam Callinan 0–1, Donnacha McHugh 0–1, Tom O'Flaherty 0–1, Dylan Thornton 0–1, Paddy Heneghan 0–1	Stadium: Páirc Seán Mac Diarmada; Referee: Ronan Hynes

13 April 2022 Semi-final	Sligo	1–12 (15) – (14) 1–11	Roscommon	Sligo
	Eoghan Smith 0–7 (0–2m, 0–1f), Lee Deignan 1–2 (1–0 pen, 0–1 '45), Luke Marren 0–1, Joseph Keaney 0–1, Dylan Walsh 0–1	Report	Adam McDermott 1–2, Jack Tumulty 0–3, Eoin Colleran 0–2 (0–1m), Daire Cregg 0–2 (0–1f), Ben O'Carroll 0–1, Oisin Cregg 0–1	Stadium: Markievicz Park; Referee: Thomas Murphy

=== Final ===
20 April 2022 Final	Sligo	4–4 (16) – (15) 1–12	Mayo	Sligo
	Jack Davitt 2–0, Eoghan Smith 1–1 (0–1f), Jack Lavin 1–0, James Donlon 0–2, Lee Deignan 0–1	Report	Paddy Heneghan 1–3 (0–1f), Frank Irwin 0–4 (0–3f), Rory Morrin 0–2, Jack Fallon 0–1, Tom O'Flaherty 0–1, Niall Tracey 0–1	Stadium: Markievicz Park; Referee: Paddy Neilan

== Leinster Under-20 Football Championship ==
=== First round ===
6 April 2022 First round	Wexford	1–7 (10) – (21) 4–9	Longford	Dublin
19:30	Gary Porter 1–0, Cian Hughes 0–2 (0–2f), Ruairí O'Brien 0–1 (0–1f), Conor Kinsella 0–1 (0–1f), Jack Higgins 0–1, Sean Hughes 0–1, Rían Fitzpatrick 0–1	Report	Jack Duggan 2–5 (0–1f), Keelin McGann 1–1, Ciaran Scanlon 1–1, Tiernan Hussey 0–1 (0–1f), Bryan Masterson 0–1	Stadium: Parnell Park; Referee: Barry Tiernan

7 April 2022 First round	Offaly	3–7 (16) – (13) 0–13	Louth	Kilcormac
19:30	Jamie Guing 1–1, Keith O'Neill 1–0 (1–0 pen), Darragh Flynn 1–0, Morgan Tynan 0–3 (0–2f), Adam Strong 0–1, Cormac Delaney 0–1	Report	Kyle McElroy 0–4 (0–2f, 0–1m), Beanon Corrigan 0–2 (0–1 '45), Brian Brady 0–2, Ben Collier 0–2, Evan Maher 0–1, Carl Gillespie 0–1, Dylan McKeown 0–1	Stadium: Faithful Fields; Referee: Anthony Nolan

7 April 2022 First round	Wicklow	2–13 (19) – (24) 4–12	Westmeath	Baltinglass
20:00	J. P. Nolan 1–3 (0–1f), Conor Fee 0–4 (0–1f, 0–1m), Tommy Keogh 1–0, Tom Moran 0–2, Matt Nolan 0–2, Matthew Ging 0–1 (0–1f), Mark Cullen 0–1	Report	Sean Leech 2–3, Ben McGauran 0–6 (0–4f, 0–1m), Senan Baker 1–2, Matthew Whittaker 1–0, Ciaran Daly 0–1	Stadium: Baltinglass GAA; Referee: Patrick Maguire

=== Quarter-finals ===
14 April 2022 Quarter-final	Kildare	2–16 (22) – (20) 3–11	Laois	Newbridge
19:30	Eoin Bagnall 0–5 (0–5f), Adam Fanning 0–5, Daniel Lynam 1–1, Dean O'Donoghue 1–0, Darragh Swords 0–2, Harry O'Neill 0–1, Niall O'Regan 0–1, Shane Farrell 0–1	Report	Colin Dunne 0–6 (0–4f, 0–1m), Shaun Fitzpatrick 1–1, Paddy Hosey 1–1, Davin McEvoy 1–0, Darragh Carolan 0–1, Rioghan Murphy 0–1, Brian Whelan 0–1	Stadium: Hawkfield Centre Of Excellence; Referee: Fintan Pierce

14 April 2022 Quarter-final	Offaly	4–13 (25) – (6) 0–6	Carlow	Kilcormac
19:30	Keith O'Neill 1–2, Harry Plunkett 0–4 (0–4f), Darragh Flynn 1–1, John Furlong 1–1, Eoin Murphy 1–0, Adam Strong 0–1, Fionn Dempsey 0–1, Marcas Dalton 0–1, Cormac Delaney 0–1, Jamie Guing 0–1	Report	Fionn McCaffrey 0–3, Bryan McMahon 0–1 (0–1f), Fiachra Fitzpatrick 0–1, Ronan Quinlan 0–1	Stadium: Faithful Fields; Referee: Barry Tiernan

14 April 2022 Quarter-final	Dublin	1–15 (18) – (13) 1–10	Westmeath	Dublin
19:30	Ryan O'Dwyer 1–2 (0–1f, 0–1m), Fionn Murray 0–3 (0–1f, 0–1 '45), Séamus Smith 0–3, Adam Waddick 0–2, Sean Kinsella 0–2, David O'Dowd 0–1, Tom Brennan 0–1, Luke Breathnach 0–1	Report	Ben McGauran 0–6 (0–4f), Peter Pierson 1–0, Senan Baker 0–2, Adam Treanor 0–1, Matthew Whittaker 0–1	Stadium: Parnell Park; Referee: Seamus Mulhare

16 April 2022 Quarter-final	Longford	0–13 (13) – (14) 1–11	Meath	Longford
14:30	Jack Duggan 0–8 (0–4f, 0–1 '45), Matt Duffy 0–2, Jack Macken 0–2, Keelin McGann 0–1	Report	Ruairí Kinsella 1–1, Niall Finnerty 0–3, Darragh Reilly 0–2, Mark Coffey 0–1, Jamie Browne 0–1, Diarmuid Moriarty 0–1, Eoghan Frayne 0–1, Pearse Sheridan 0–1	Stadium: Pearse Park; Referee: John Hickey

=== Semi-finals ===
21 April 2022 Semi-final	Offaly	0–15 (15) – (17) 2–11	Kildare	Tullamore
18:30	Cormac Delaney 0–5 (0–4f, 0–1 '45), Harry Plunkett 0–3 (0–3f), Keith O'Neill 0–3, Morgan Tynan 0–2, Darragh Flynn 0–1, Marcus Dalton 0–1	Report	Aaron Browne 1–2, Eoin Bagnall 0–3 (0–1m, 0–1f), Daniel Lynam 1–0, Adam Fanning 0–2, Cormac Barker 0–1 (0–1f), Darragh Swords 0–1, Shane Farrell 0–1, James Dalton 0–1	Stadium: O'Connor Park; Referee: Patrick Maguire

21 April 2022 Semi-final	Dublin	4–12 (24) – (17) 1–14	Meath	Dublin
19:30	Ryan O'Dwyer 1–6 (0–4f), Fionn Murray 0–6 (0–4f), Luke Breathnach 2–0, Adam Waddick 1–0	Report	Eoghan Frayne 1–4 (0–2f, 0–1 '45), Darragh Reilly 0–3, Pearse Sheridan 0–3, Oisin Martin 0–2, Niall Finnerty 0–1 (0–1f), Ruairí Kinsella 0–1	Stadium: Parnell Park; Referee: Anthony Nolan

=== Final ===
28 April 2022 Final	Kildare	0–17 (17) – (15) 0–15	Dublin	Portlaoise
19:30	Eoin Bagnall 0–4 (0–2f), Adam Fanning 0–4, Tommy Gill 0–2, Daniel Lynam 0–2, Aaron Browne 0–1 (0–1m), Cormac Barker 0–1 (0–1f), Shane Farrell 0–1, Darragh Swords 0–1, James Dalton 0–1	Report	Fionn Murray 0–5 (0–3f), Luke Breathnach 0–5, Ryan O'Dwyer 0–3 (0–1f), Sean Kinsella 0–1, David O'Dowd 0–1	Stadium: O'Moore Park; Referee: Seamus Mulhare

== Munster Under-20 Football Championship ==
=== Quarter-finals ===
11 April 2022 Quarter-final	Waterford	1–6 (9) – (15) 2–9	Limerick	Dungarvan
	Kyle Cuddy 0–3 (0–3f), Eoin O'Callaghan 1–0, Tom O'Connell 0–1 (0–1f), Mikey O'Brien 0–1, D. J. Kiely 0–1	Report	David O'Shaughnessy 1–2 (1–0 pen, 0–1f), Darragh Murray 1–1, Shane O'Donoghue 0–1 (0–1f), Conall Ó Duinn 0–1, Sean Kilbridge 0–1, Darragh Bridgeman 0–1, Eoin McGrath 0–1, Jamie Baynham 0–1	Stadium: Fraher Field; Referee: Cormac Dineen

11 April 2022 Quarter-final	Clare	3–15 (24) – (11) 2–5	Tipperary	Milltown Malbay
	Brendy Rouine 0–5 (0–4f), Sean McNamara 1–2, Brian McNamara 1–1, Shane Griffin 1–1, Joe Raftery 0–2 (0–1f), Cillian McGroary 0–2, Thomas Meenaghan 0–1, Fionn Kelleher 0–1	Report	Jamie Holloway 1–0, Cathal Deeley 1–0, Darragh Brennan 0–2, (0–1f), Cian Smyth 0–1 (0–1f), Diarmuid O'Riordan 0–1, James Corcoran 0–1	Stadium: Hennessy Memorial Park; Referee: Jonathan Hayes

=== Semi-finals ===
18 April 2022 Semi-final	Clare	0–8 (8) – (14) 1–11	Kerry	Milltown Malbay
	Brendy Rouine 0–2 (0–1f), Eoin Rouine 0–2, Joe Rafferty 0–2, Thomas Mennaghan 0–1, Sean McNamara 0–1	Report	Cillian Burke 1–2, Dylan Geaney 0–4 (0–1f), Kevin Goulding 0–3, Devon Burns 0–1 (0–1f), Thomas O'Donnell 0–1	Stadium: Hennessy Memorial Park; Referee: John Ryan

18 April 2022 Semi-final	Limerick	0–5 (5) – (21) 2–15	Cork	Ballyagran
	Emmet Rigter 0–2 (0–2f), Darragh Murray 0–1 (0–1 '45), David O'Shaughnessy 0–1 (0–1f), Cormac Woulfe 0–1	Report	Ryan O'Donovan 1–6 (1–0 pen, 0–2f, 0–2 '45), Conor Hanlon 0–4 (0–2f), Hugh Murphy 1–0, Darragh O'Mahony 0–3, Paddy O'Driscoll 0–1, Conor Daly 0–1	Stadium: Castletown Ballyagran GAA; Referee: Niall Quinn

=== Final ===
25 April 2022 Final	Kerry	1–11 (14) – (7) 0–7	Cork	Tralee
19:00	Thomas O'Donnell 1–1, Gearoid Hassett 0–2, Jack O'Connor 0–2, Jordan Kissane 0–2, Dylan Geaney 0–1 (0–1f), Ruairi Murphy 0–1, Evan Looney 0–1, Keith Evans 0–1	Report	Ryan O'Donovan 0–2, Conor Hanlon 0–1 (0–1f), Sean Brady 0–1, Alan Walsh 0–1, Colin Walsh 0–1, Hugh Murphy 0–1	Stadium: Austin Stack Park; Referee: Chris Maguire

== Ulster Under-20 Football Championship ==
=== First round ===
25 March 2022 First round	Down	2–13 (19) – (7) 0–7	Fermanagh	Newry
20:00	Oisin Savage 1–5 (0–2f), Jack Murtagh 0–3 (0–2f), Adam Crimmins 1–0, Odhran Murdock 0–2, Patrick McCarthy 0–1, Callum Rodgers 0–1, Paudie Clancy 0–1	Report	Fionan O'Brien 0–5 (0-5f), Odhrán Johnston 0–1, Micheál Flanagan 0–1	Stadium: Páirc Esler; Referee: Pat Clarke

=== Quarter-finals ===
1 April 2022 Quarter-final	Monaghan	0–3 (3) – (14) 1–11	Cavan	Inniskeen
20:15	Ronan Boyle 0–1, Tiarnan Kearns 0–1, Stephen Mooney 0–1	Report	Darragh Lovett 1–1, Tiarnan Madden 0–3 (0–2f), Fionntán O'Reilly 0–3 (0–2f), Peter Devine 0–2, Turlough Farrelly 0–1, Eoghan Hartin 0–1	Stadium: Páirc Grattan; Referee: Micheál Moore

1 April 2022 Quarter-final	Derry	0–12 (12) – (9) 0–9	Antrim	Dungiven
20:00	Charlie Diamond 0–6 (0–5f), Lachlan Murray 0–5 (0–1f), Ryan McEldowney 0–1	Report	Aidan McAleese 0–4 (0–2f), Sean Duffin 0–1, Sean O'Neill 0–1, Eunan Quinn 0–1, Paudie McLaughlin 0–1, Cahir Donnelly 0–1	Stadium: Owenbeg; Referee: James Lewis

1 April 2022 Quarter-final	Donegal	1–13 (16) – (9) 0–9	Armagh	Ballybofey
20:00	Johnny McGroddy 0–7 (0–4f), Luke McGlynn 1–2, Keelan Dunleavy 0–1, Eric Carr 0–1, Eoin Dowling 0–1, Richard O'Rourke 0–1	Report	Ronan Fitzpatrick 0–4 (0–4f), Shea Magill 0–1 (0–1 '45), Luke McKeever 0–1 (0–1f), Caolan Finnegan 0–1, Darragh McMullen 0–1, Antoin McParland 0–1	Stadium: MacCumhaill Park; Referee: Anthony Marron

2 April 2022 Quarter-final	Tyrone	1–13 (16) – (11) 1–8	Down	Loughmacrory
13:00	Ruairí Canavan 0–5 (0–4f), Luke Donnelly 1–1 (1–0 pen), Conor Cush 0–3, Ciaran Daly 0–2, Ciarán Bogue 0–1, Michael McGleenan 0–1	Report	Adam Crimmins 1–1, Oisin Savage 0–3 (0–1f), Aaron Murdock 0–2 (0–1f, 0–1 '45), Odhran Murdock 0–1, Ryan Mackey 0–1	Stadium: Páirc an Locha; Referee: Enda McFeely

=== Semi-finals ===
8 April 2022 Semi-final	Cavan	0–11 (11) – (9) 0–9	Derry	Armagh
20:00	Fionntán O'Reilly 0–6 (0–1f, 0–1m), Darragh Lovett 0–1 (0–1m), Cormac Brady 0–1, Turlough Farrelly 0–1, Caolan O'Reilly 0–1, Conor Casey 0–1	Report	Charlie Diamond 0–5 (0–3f), Mark Dixon 0–1 (0–1f), Jamie Duggan 0–1, Dan Higgins 0–1, Niall O'Donnell 0–1	Stadium: Athletic Grounds; Referee: Darren O'Hare

8 April 2022 Semi-final	Donegal	2–16 (22) – (25) 3–16 (a.e.t.)	Tyrone	Derry
20:00	Bobby McGettigan 2–2, Keelan Dunleavy 0–4, Eoin Dowling 0–3 (0–2f), Johnny McGroddy 0–3 (0–1f), Carlos O'Reilly 0–2, Kieran Tobin 0–1, Eric Carr 0–1	Report	Ruairí Canavan 0–7 (0–4f, 0–1m), Gavin Potter 1–2, Conor Cush 1–1, Niall Devlin 1–0, Lórcan McGarrity 0–2 (0–2m), Ciarán Bogue 0–2, James Donaghy 0–1, Ruairí McHugh 0–1	Stadium: Celtic Park; Referee: Anthony Marron

=== Final ===
22 April 2022 Final	Cavan	0–10 (10) – (11) 0–11	Tyrone	Enniskillen
20:00	Fionntán O'Reilly 0–3 (0–3f), Darragh Lovett 0–3, Brían O'Rourke 0–2, Daire Madden 0–2	Report	Ruairí Canavan 0–7 (0–6f, 0–1 sideline), Brian Conway 0–1, Ruairí McHugh 0–1, Conor Cush 0–1, Gavin Potter 0–1	Stadium: Brewster Park; Referee: Enda McFeely

== All-Ireland Under-20 Football Championship ==
=== Semi-finals ===
7 May 2022 Semi-final	Sligo	0–7 (7) – (12) 0–12	Kildare	Cavan
	Joseph Keaney 0–2, Lee Deignan 0–1 (0–1f), Oisín Flynn 0–1, Gavin Duffy 0–1, Canice Mulligan 0–1, Eoghan Smith 0–1	Report	Aaron Browne 0–5, Tommy Gill 0–2 (0–2f), Niall O'Regan 0–1, Daniel Lynam 0–1, Adam Fanning 0–1, Dean O’Donoghue 0–1	Stadium: Breffni Park; Referee: Martin McNally

8 May 2022 Semi-final	Kerry	1–12 (15) – (17) 1–14	Tyrone	Portlaoise
	Dylan Geaney 1–4 (0–2f), Kevin Goulding 0–4, Ruairi Murphy 0–2, Devon Burns 0–1 (0–1f), Cillian Burke 0–1	Report	Ruairí Canavan 0–8 (0–3f, 0–1m), Ciarán Bogue 1–2, Conor Cush 0–2, Sean O'Donnell 0–1, Michael McGleenan 0–1	Stadium: O'Moore Park; Referee: Anthony Nolan

=== Final ===
14 May 2022 Final	Kildare	1–14 (17) – (23) 1–20	Tyrone	Carrick-on-Shannon
	Eoin Bagnall 0–5 (0–1f), Luke Killian 0–3, Daniel Lynam 1–0, Niall O'Regan 0–2, Dean O'Donoghue 0–1, Tommy Gill 0–1, Adam Fanning 0–1, Darragh Swords 0–1	Report	Ruairí Canavan 1–7 (0–3f), Niall Devlin 0–3, Ciaran Daly 0–2, James Donaghy 0–1, Ruairí McHugh 0–1, Conor Cush 0–1, Ciarán Bogue 0–1, Michael McGleenan 0–1, Dan Muldoon 0–1, Gavin Potter 0–1, Luke Donnelly 0–1	Stadium: Páirc Seán Mac Diarmada; Referee: Liam Devenney

== Statistics ==
=== Top scorers overall ===
Rank	Player	County	Tally	Total	Matches	Average
1	Ruairí Canavan	Tyrone	1–34	37	5	7.40
2	Jack Duggan	Longford	2–13	19	2	9.50
3	Ryan O'Dwyer	Dublin	2–11	17	3	5.67
3	Eoin Bagnall	Kildare	0–17	17	5	3.40
5	Fionn Murray	Dublin	0–14	14	3	4.67
6	Daniel Lynam	Kildare	3–4	13	5	2.60
6	Adam Fanning	Kildare	0–13	13	5	2.60
8	Luke Breathnach	Dublin	2–6	12	3	4.00
8	Dylan Geaney	Kerry	1–9	12	3	4.00
8	Eoghan Smith	Sligo	1–9	12	3	4.00
8	Frank Irwin	Mayo	0–12	12	3	4.00
8	Fionntán O'Reilly	Cavan	0–12	12	3	4.00
8	Ben McGauran	Westmeath	0–12	12	2	6.00

=== Top scorers in a single game ===
Rank	Player	County	Tally	Total	Opposition
1	Jack Duggan	Longford	2–5	11	Wexford
2	Ruairí Canavan	Tyrone	1–7	10	Kildare
2	Sean Leech	Westmeath	2–3	9	Wicklow
2	Ryan O'Dwyer	Dublin	1–6	9	Meath
2	Ryan O'Donovan	Cork	1–6	9	Limerick
6	Bobby McGettigan	Donegal	2–2	8	Tyrone
6	Oisin Savage	Longford	1–5	8	Fermanagh
6	Ruairí Canavan	Tyrone	0–8	8	Kerry
6	Jack Duggan	Longford	0–8	8	Meath
10	Dylan Geaney	Kerry	1–4	7	Tyrone
10	Eoghan Frayne	Meath	1–4	7	Dublin
10	Ruairí Canavan	Tyrone	0–7	7	Cavan
10	Ruairí Canavan	Tyrone	0–7	7	Donegal
10	Eoghan Smith	Sligo	0–7	7	Roscommon
10	Johnny McGroddy	Donegal	0–7	7	Armagh
