= 2018 All-Ireland Under-20 Football Championship =

Championship details
- Dates: 25 May – 5 August 2018
- Teams: 31

All-Ireland Champions
- Winning team: Kildare (2nd win)
- Captain: Aaron Masterson
- Manager: Davy Burke

All-Ireland Finalists
- Losing team: Mayo
- Captain: Ryan O'Donoghue
- Manager: Mike Solan

Provincial Champions
- Munster: Kerry
- Leinster: Kildare
- Ulster: Derry
- Connacht: Mayo

Championship statistics
- Player of the Year: Jimmy Hyland

The 2018 Inter-County Under 20 Football Championship was the 55th edition of the competition, and the first since the competition was re-graded from Under 21 to Under 20. It was sponsored by Eirgrid, and known as the EirGrid GAA Football U20 All-Ireland Championship for sponsorship purposes. 31 counties played in the tournament (Kilkenny did not participate). The competition began with a preliminary round game in Ulster on 25 May 2018, and ended with the final on 5 August 2018.

== Competition format ==
Player eligibility

Players under 20 years of age cannot play for a county's senior and under-20 championship teams. This rule was introduced to prevent player burnout and to allow the senior and under-20 championships to be scheduled in the same summer months with separate panels of players. If an under-20 player plays for a county's senior championship team, he is ineligible to play for their under-20 team.

This rule results in some county under-20 county teams playing without their best under-20 footballers. For example, Sean O'Shea and David Clifford played for the Kerry senior championship team in 2018 and therefore were not allowed to play for the Kerry under-20 team which meant that the under-20 team was weakened.

Provincial Championships format

Connacht, Leinster, Munster and Ulster each organise a provincial championship. Each province decides the format for their championship – the format can be straight knockout, double-elimination, a league, groups, etc. or a combination.

All-Ireland format

The four provincial winners meet in two semi-finals, with the winners of those matches playing in the All-Ireland Under-20 Football Championship Final.

== Provincial championships ==
=== Connacht Championship ===
Preliminary round

Quarter-Final
Roscommon	3-10
Sligo	3-05

Semi-Final
Galway	0-11
Roscommon	1-11
Mayo	1-24
Leitrim	1-03

Final
Roscommon	1-06
Mayo	3-16

==== Connacht Quarter-Finals ====
2 June 2018; 17:00; Quarter-Final	Roscommon	3-10 - 3-5	Sligo	Dr. Hyde Park; Referee: Liam Devenney (Mayo)
2 June 2018; 17:00; Quarter-Final	Cian McKeon 2-2, Aidan Dowd 1-0, David McManus 0-3f, Brian Derwin 0-2, Aaron Brady (0-1f), Conor Shanagher, Paul Carey 0-1 each	Report	Red Óg Murphy 2-3 (0-1f), Barry Gorman 1-0, Joe McHugh (0-1f) and Ciaran O'Dowd 0-1 each	Dr. Hyde Park; Referee: Liam Devenney (Mayo)

==== Connacht Semi-Finals ====
9 June 2018; 16:00; Semi-Final 1	Roscommon	1-11 - 0-11	Galway	Tuam Stadium, Tuam; Referee: Eamon O'Grady
9 June 2018; 16:00; Semi-Final 1		Report		Tuam Stadium, Tuam; Referee: Eamon O'Grady

9 June 2018; 13:30; Semi-Final 2	Mayo	1-24 - 1-3	Leitrim	McHale Park; Referee: Martin Flaherty
9 June 2018; 13:30; Semi-Final 2		Report		McHale Park; Referee: Martin Flaherty

==== Connacht Final ====
17 June 2018; 12:00; Final	Roscommon	1-6 - 3-16	Mayo	Dr. Hyde Park

=== Leinster Championship ===
==== Group stage ====
===== Group 1 =====
Pos	Team	Pld	W	D	L	PF	PA	PD	Pts	Qualification
1	Dublin	3	3	0	0	67	38	+29	6	Advance to semi-final
2	Westmeath	3	2	0	1	53	50	+3	4	Advance to quarter-final
3	Wexford	3	1	0	2	48	51	−3	2	
4	Longford	3	0	0	3	39	68	−29	0	

Updated to match(es) played on 4 June 2018. Source: Leinster GAA
Rules for classification: 1) League points 2) Where only two teams are involved, the outcome of the meeting of the two teams in the competition 3) Scoring Difference 4) Highest Total Score For 5) A Play-Off.

Round 1

28 May 2018; 7:00 pm	Westmeath	2-12 - 1-12	Wexford	Cusack Park, Mullingar; Referee: Patrick Maguire (Longford)
28 May 2018; 7:00 pm	Sean Pettit 1-7 (0-4f), James Maxwell 1-0, John Tumulty 0-3f, Daniel Reid and Ben Cox 0-1 each		Darragh Lyons 1-1 (1-0 pen, 0-1f), Jamie Meyler (0-2f) and Sean Nolan (0-1f) 0-4 each, Ivan Meegan 0-2 (0-1f, 1 '45), Gavin Sheehan 0-1	Cusack Park, Mullingar; Referee: Patrick Maguire (Longford)

28 May 2018; 7:00 pm	Dublin	2-21 - 0-11	Longford	Pearse Park; Referee: Niall Ward (Westmeath)
28 May 2018; 7:00 pm	Dan O'Brien 1-9, Tom Keane 1-1, Cormac Howley, Sean Bugler, Ciaran Archer (0-1f, 1 '45) 0-3 each, James Madden and James Doran 0-1 each	Report	Tomas McGann 0-5f, Shane Farrell, Iarla O'Sullivan, Peter Lynn, Alan McKeon (0-1f), Rory Hawkins, Ruairi Harkin 0-1 each	Pearse Park; Referee: Niall Ward (Westmeath)

Round 2

4 June 2018; 2:00 pm	Dublin	2-16 - 1-13	Westmeath	Parnell Park; Referee: Brendan Cawley (Kildare)
4 June 2018; 2:00 pm	Sean Bugler 1-4, James Doran 0-4 (0-1f), James Madden 1-0, Cormac Howley, Tom Keane (0-1f), Dan O'Brien 0-2 each, Sean Farrelly and Ciaran Archer (0-1f) 0-1 each	Report	Sean Pettit 1-6 (0-1f, 3 '45), John Tumulty (0-2f) and Tom Molloy 0-2 each, Gareth Carr, Adam Loughlin, Daniel Reid 0-1 each	Parnell Park; Referee: Brendan Cawley (Kildare)

4 June 2018; 2:00 pm	Wexford	3-13 - 2-9	Longford	Wexford Park; Referee: John Hickey (Carlow)
4 June 2018; 2:00 pm	Ivan Meegan 1-2 (1-0 pen, 0-2f), Kyle Firman 0-4, Barry O'Connor 1-1, Robbie Brooks 1-0, Sean Nolan (0-2f) and Jamie Meyler 0-2 each, Mikey Dwyer and Cathal Devereux 0-1 each	Report	Joe Kelly 2-1, Alan McKeon (0-1f, 1 '45) and Thomas McGann (0-1f) 0-2 each, Ciaran McKeon, Iarla O'Sullivan, Rory Hawkins, Cian McElligott 0-1 each	Wexford Park; Referee: John Hickey (Carlow)

Round 3

16 June 2018; 2:00 pm	Dublin	1-15 - 0-11	Wexford	Wexford Park; Referee: John Hickey (Carlow)
16 June 2018; 2:00 pm	Ross McGarry 1-2, Tom Keane 0-4, James Doran 0-3 (0-1f), Cormac Howley and Dan O'Brien (0-1 pen) 0-2 each, Sean Farrelly and Sean Bugler 0-1 each	Report	Ivan Meegan 0-4 (0-3f), Richie Waters, Kyle Firman, Cathal Devereux 0-2 each, Sean Nolan 0-1	Wexford Park; Referee: John Hickey (Carlow)

16 June 2018; 2:00 pm	Westmeath	1-16 - 1-10	Longford	Pearse Park; Referee: Patrick Coyle (Meath)
16 June 2018; 2:00 pm	Sean Pettit 0-6 (0-4f), Tom Molloy 1-2, Daniel Reid, Nigel Harte, James Maxwell 0-2 each, Adam Loughlin and Brian Kavanagh 0-1 each	Report	Ruairi Harkin 1-0, Rory Hawkins 0-3, Thomas McGann 0-2 (0-1f), Mark McCormack, Shane Farrell, Daire Duggan, Peter Lynn, Kyle Kenny 0-1 each	Pearse Park; Referee: Patrick Coyle (Meath)

===== Group 2 =====
Pos	Team	Pld	W	D	L	PF	PA	PD	Pts	Qualification
1	Meath	3	3	0	0	70	41	+29	6	Advance to semi-final
2	Kildare	3	2	0	1	60	39	+21	4	Advance to quarter-final
3	Laois	3	1	0	2	48	55	−7	2	
4	Wicklow	3	0	0	3	32	75	−43	0	

Updated to match(es) played on 4 June 2018. Source: Leinster GAA
Rules for classification: 1) League points 2) Where only two teams are involved, the outcome of the meeting of the two teams in the competition 3) Scoring Difference 4) Highest Total Score For 5) A Play-Off.

Round 1

28 May 2018; 7:00 pm	Meath	6-16 - 1-9	Wicklow	Joule Park; Referee: John Hickey (Carlow)
28 May 2018; 7:00 pm	Sean Reilly 2-3, Darragh Campion and Conor Moriarty (0-1f) 1-2 each, Frank O'Reilly 1-1 (1-0 pen), Sean Ryan 1-0, Jordan Morris 0-4 (0-2f), Shane McDonnell 0-2, Adam Murphy and Conor O'Byrne (0-1f) 0-1 each	Report	Dan Kelly (f) 1-2, Gearoid Murphy 0-3f, Rory Stokes (0-1f), Matthew Kelly, Conor Byrne, Jack Bellamy 0-1 each	Joule Park; Referee: John Hickey (Carlow)

28 May 2018; 7:00 pm	Kildare	1-17 - 4-6	Laois	Newbridge; Referee: Barry Tiernan (Dublin)
28 May 2018; 7:00 pm	Jimmy Hyland 1-6 (0-3f), Brian McLoughlin 0-6 (0-5f), Paddy Woodgate 0-2 (0-1f), Sam Doran, Niall Murphy, Darragh Ryan 0-1 each	Report	Diarmuid Whelan 2-3 (0-2f), Evan Lowry 2-1, James Kelly and Alan Kinsella 0-1 each	Newbridge; Referee: Barry Tiernan (Dublin)

Round 2

4 June 2018; 2:00 pm	Meath	2-11 - 1-13	Kildare	Páirc Tailteann; Referee: Patrick Maguire (Longford)
4 June 2018; 2:00 pm	Darragh Campion and Jordan Morris 1-1 each, James Conlon 0-4, Frank O'Reilly 0-3 (0-2f), Sean Reilly and Conor Moriarty 0-1 each	Report	Jimmy Hyland 1-3 (0-2f), Brian McLoughlin 0-4 (0-3f), Paddy Woodgate 0-2, Ruadhan Ó Giolláin, David Marnell, Sam Doran, Tony Archibold 0-1 each	Páirc Tailteann; Referee: Patrick Maguire (Longford)

4 June 2018; 2:00 pm	Laois	1-14 - 1-13	Wicklow	O'Moore Park, Portlaoise; Referee: Darragh Sheppard (Dublin)
4 June 2018; 2:00 pm	Diarmuid Whelan 1-7 (0-4f), Evan Lowry 0-3, Peter Kealy 0-2, James Kelly (0-1f) and Alan Kinsella 0-1 each	Report	Gearoid Murphy 0-5 (0-3f), Conor Byrne 1-0, Thomas Kearns and Adam McHugh 0-2 each, Fintan O'Shea, Robert Kelly, Dan Kelly, Matthew Kelly 0-1 each	O'Moore Park, Portlaoise; Referee: Darragh Sheppard (Dublin)

Round 3

16 June 2018; 2:00 pm	Kildare	3-17 - 0-4	Wicklow	Newbridge; Referee: Chris Dwyer (Offaly)
16 June 2018; 2:00 pm	Jimmy Hyland 0-12 (0-3f), Padraig Nash 2-0, Brian McLoughlin 1-1, Stephen Comerford, Jack Bambrick, Tony Archbold, Paddy Woodgate (0-1f) 0-1 each	Report	Dan Kelly 0-3 (0-2f), Conor Byrne 0-1f	Newbridge; Referee: Chris Dwyer (Offaly)

16 June 2018; 2:00 pm	Meath	2-13 - 0-13	Laois	Páirc Tailteann; Referee: Fergal Smyth (Offaly)
16 June 2018; 2:00 pm	Ethan Devine 2-1, Darragh Campion and Conor Moriarty (0-3f) 0-3 each, Jason Scully, Frank O'Reilly (0-1f), James Conlon 0-2 each	Report	Diarmuid Whelan 0-7 (0-5f), Evan Lowry 0-2, Peter Kealy, Eoin Dunne, Alan Kinsella, Ronan Coffey 0-1 each	Páirc Tailteann; Referee: Fergal Smyth (Offaly)

===== Group 3 =====
Pos	Team	Pld	W	D	L	PF	PA	PD	Pts	Qualification
1	Offaly	2	2	0	0	47	23	+24	4	Advance to quarter-final
2	Carlow	2	1	0	1	39	49	−10	2	Advance to quarter-final
3	Louth	2	0	0	2	34	48	−14	0	

Updated to match(es) played on 4 June 2018. Source: Leinster GAA
Rules for classification: 1) League points 2) Where only two teams are involved, the outcome of the meeting of the two teams in the competition 3) Scoring Difference 4) Highest Total Score For 5) A Play-Off.

Round 1

28 May 2018; 7:00 pm	Offaly	2-19 - 1-10	Carlow	Dr. Cullen Park; Referee: Darragh Sheppard (Dublin)
28 May 2018; 7:00 pm	Cian Johnson 1-7, Cian Farrell 0-6 (0-4f), Shane O'Brien 1-1, Jack Darcy 0-2, Sean Ibbotson, Kevin McDermott, Conor Dunne 0-1 each	Report	Conor Crowley 1-4 (1-0 pen, 0-2f), Andrew Kehoe and Conor Doyle (0-1f) 0-2 each, Niall Roche and Cormac Lomax 0-1 each	Dr. Cullen Park; Referee: Darragh Sheppard (Dublin)

Round 2

4 June 2018; 2:00 pm	Carlow	5-11 - 3-15	Louth	Drogheda Park; Referee: Barry Tiernan (Dublin)

Round 3

June 2018	v

==== Knockout stage ====
Preliminary round

Quarter-Final
Kildare	4-19
Carlow	0-08
Offaly	1-17
Westmeath	1-10

Semi-Final
Dublin	4-16
Meath	2-10
Kildare	3-14
Offaly	2-05

Final
Dublin	0-10
Kildare	1-15

===== Leinster Quarter-Finals =====
22 June 2018; 7:30 pm Quarter-Final	Kildare	4-19 - 0-8	Carlow	Dr. Cullen Park; Referee: Niall Ward (Westmeath)
22 June 2018; 7:30 pm Quarter-Final	Aaron Masterson 1-2, Jimmy Hyland 0-5 (0-2f), Paddy Woodgate (0-1f), Shane O'Sullivan, Niall Murphy 1-1 each, Padraig Nash 0-3 (0-1f), DJ Early (0-1f, 1 '45) and Sam Doran 0-2 each, Darragh Ryan and Jack Barrett (0-1f) 0-1 each	Report	Conor Crowley 0-3 (0-1f), Niall Roche, Cian Doyle, Conor Doyle (0-1f), Robbie Kane 0-1 each	Dr. Cullen Park; Referee: Niall Ward (Westmeath)

23 June 2018; 3:00 pm Quarter-Final	Offaly	1-17 - 1-10	Westmeath	O'Connor Park; Referee: Patrick Maguire (Longford)
23 June 2018; 3:00 pm Quarter-Final	Cian Farrell 0-8 (0-7f, 1 '45), Cian Johnson 0-4, Jack Darcy 1-0, Shane O’Brien 0-2 (1f), Pa Robilliard, Dan Wyer, Conor Dunne 0-1 each	Report	Brian Kavanagh 1-4, Conor Dillon 0-2, Adam Loughlin, John Tumulty, Daniel Reid, Sean Pettit (0-1f)	O'Connor Park; Referee: Patrick Maguire (Longford)

===== Leinster Semi-Finals =====
29 June 2018; 7:30 pm Semi-Final 1	Kildare	3-14 - 2-5	Offaly	O'Connor Park; Referee: John Hickey (Carlow)
29 June 2018; 7:30 pm Semi-Final 1	Brian McLoughlin 2-2, Padraig Nash and Jimmy Hyland (0-1f) 0-3 each, Paddy Woodgate 1-0, Stephen Comerford, Ruadhán Ó’Giolláin, Aaron Masterson, Tony Archbold, Cian Costigan, Niall Murphy 0-1 each	Report	Conor Dunne 1-1, Kevin McDermott 1-0, Cian Johnson, Cian Farrell (0-1f), Jack Darcy, Robin Galbraith 0-1 each	O'Connor Park; Referee: John Hickey (Carlow)

30 June 2018; 7:30 pm Semi-Final 2	Dublin	4-16 - 2-10	Meath	Páirc Tailteann; Referee: Brendan Cawley (Kildare)
30 June 2018; 7:30 pm Semi-Final 2	Tom Keane 0-7 (0-2f), Ross McGarry 1-4 (0-1f), James Doran 2-1, Karl Lynch Bissett 1-0, Sean Bugler 0-2, Cormac Howley and Dan O'Brien 0-1 each	Report	Jordan Morris 1-4 (0-3f), Frank O'Reilly 1-2 (1-0 pen, 0-1f), Ethan Devine, James Conlon, Shane Walsh, Adam Kealy 0-1 each	Páirc Tailteann; Referee: Brendan Cawley (Kildare)

===== Leinster Final =====
6 July 2018; 19:30; Final	Kildare	1-15 - 0-10	Dublin	O'Connor Park, Tullamore; Referee: Anthony Nolan (Wicklow); Man of the Match: Jimmy Hyland (Ballyteague)
6 July 2018; 19:30; Final	Jimmy Hyland 0-8 (0-6f), Tony Archbold 1-1 (1-0 pen), Padraig Nash 0-3, Brian McLoughlin, Paddy Woodgate, Shane O’Sullivan 0-1 each	Report	Tom Keane 0-4 (0-1f), Sean Bugler 0-3, Cormac Howley, Ross McGarry, James Doran 0-1 each	O'Connor Park, Tullamore; Referee: Anthony Nolan (Wicklow); Man of the Match: Jimmy Hyland (Ballyteague)

=== Munster Championship ===
Preliminary round

Quarter-Final
Cork	1-20
Tipperary	0-08
Limerick	0-05
Kerry	1-30

Semi-Final
Clare	0-15
Cork	1-16
Waterford	0-01
Kerry	3-22

Final
Cork	0-14
Kerry	3-11

==== Munster Quarter-Finals ====
15 June 2018; 19:30; Quarter-Final	Kerry	1-30 - 0-5	Limerick	Newcastle West; Referee: James Bermingham (Cork)
15 June 2018; 19:30; Quarter-Final	Fiachra Clifford 0-7 (0-3f), David Shaw 1-4 (0-1f), Donal O'Sullivan 0-6 (0-2f), Bryan Sweeney 0-4, Cormac Linnane and Brian Friel 0-3 each, Daniel O’Brien, Diarmuid O'Connor, Patrick Warren 0-1 each	Report	Rob Childs 0-2f, Lee Woulfe, Liam Kennedy, Adam Lacey 0-1 each	Newcastle West; Referee: James Bermingham (Cork)

16 June 2018; 19:30; Quarter-Final	Cork	1-20 - 0-8	Tipperary	Páirc Uí Rinn; Attendance: 1,161; Referee: Padraig O’Sullivan (Kerry)
16 June 2018; 19:30; Quarter-Final	Chris Og Jones 0-6 (0-1f, 2 '45), Matthew Bradley 0-4 (0-2f), Cillian Myers-Murray 1-1, Sean Walsh 0-3, Tadhg Corkery and Damien Gore 0-2 each, Aidan Browne and Cathal Maguire 0-1 each	Report	Jack Delahunty 0-3 each, Conal Kennedy 0-2, Ríain Quigley (0-1f), Ryan Lambe, Brian Fitzpatrick 0-1 each	Páirc Uí Rinn; Attendance: 1,161; Referee: Padraig O’Sullivan (Kerry)

==== Munster Semi-Finals ====
22 June 2018; 19:30; Semi-Final 1	Clare	v	Cork

22 June 2018; 19:30; Semi-Final 2	Waterford	v	Kerry

==== Munster Final ====
29 June 2018
19:30 IST (UTC+1)
Final

Report

Cork	0-14 (14) – (20) 3-11	Kerry
(HT: 0-09 – 1-06)
Pts: Chris Og Jones (7, 3f), Colm O'Callaghan (2), Mark Keane (2), Tadhg Corkery, Colm Barrett, Damien Gore		Gls: Mark Ryan (pen), David Shaw, Eddie Horan; Pts: Donal O'Sullivan (4, 2f), Fiachra Clifford (2, 1f), Cormac Linnane (2), Sean O'Leary (2), Graham O'Sullivan

Austin Stack Park, Tralee
Referee: Sean Lonergan (Tipperary)

=== Ulster Championship ===
The Ulster championship is organised on a random draw. All matches are straight knockout. The winners receive the Danny Murphy Cup which was commissioned in 2018 in honour of the former Ulster Chief Executive Officer and Secretary.

Preliminary round
Donegal	2-21
Cavan	0-10

Quarter-Final
Fermanagh	0-10
Armagh	2-14
Tyrone	0-17
Monaghan	2-08
Down	4-15
Antrim	3-13
Derry	0-16
Donegal	2-09

Semi-Final
Armagh	2-22
Tyrone	0-24
Down	2-15
Derry	2-17

Final
Armagh	0-14
Derry	2-15

==== Ulster Preliminary Round ====
27 May 2018 Preliminary round	Donegal	2-21 (27) – (10) 0-10	Cavan	Derry
14:00 IST (UTC+1)				Venue: Celtic Park
				Referee: Paul McKeever (Antrim)

==== Ulster Quarter-Finals ====
25 May 2018 Quarter-Final A	Fermanagh	0-10 (10) – (20) 2-14	Armagh	Enniskillen
20:00 IST (UTC+1)				Venue: Brewster Park
				Referee: Enda McFeely (Donegal)

25 May 2018 Quarter-Final B	Tyrone	0-17 (17) – (14) 2-08	Monaghan	Omagh
20:00 IST (UTC+1)				Venue: Healy Park
				Referee: Paul Faloon (Down)

26 May 2018 Quarter-Final C	Down	4-15 (27) – (22) 3-13	Antrim	Newry
17:00 IST (UTC+1)				Venue: Páirc Esler
				Referee: Margaret Farrelly (Cavan)

3 June 2018 Quarter-Final D	Derry	0-16 (16) – (15) 2-09	Donegal	Omagh
11:45 IST (UTC+1)				Venue: Healy Park
				Referee: Anthony Marron (Monaghan)

==== Ulster Semi-Finals ====
8 June 2018
20:00 IST (UTC+1)
Semi-Final 1

Armagh	2-22 (28) – (24) 0-24 (a.e.t.)	Tyrone
Note: A brawl occurred in the first period of extra time (two ten minutes played each way). The Central Competitions Control Committee imposed a suspension on ten Armagh players and seven Tyrone players. Armagh appealed the suspensions and eight of their ten players were cleared on the Friday before the final.

Athletic Grounds, Armagh
Referee: Niall McKenna (Monaghan)

10 June 2018
14:00 IST (UTC+1)
Semi-Final 2

Down	2-15 (21) – (23) 2-17	Derry

St Tiernach's Park, Clones
Referee: Conor Dourneen (Cavan)

==== Ulster Final ====
24 June 2018
11:45 IST (UTC+1)
Final

Report

Derry	2-15 (21) – (14) 0-14	Armagh
(HT: 0-08 – 0-06)
Gls: Brian Cassidy (2); Pts: Declan Cassidy (5), Lorcan McWilliams (5, 4f), Brian Cassidy (2), Ben McCarron (2), Oisin McWilliams		Pts: Ross McQuillan (6), Rian O’Neill (4, 3f), Conor O’Neill (2, 1f), Jason Duffy (2)

St. Tiernach's Park, Clones
Referee: Sean Laverty (Antrim)

== All-Ireland ==
=== Semi-finals ===
TG4.ie
stream

14 July 2018
16:00 IST (UTC+1)
Semi-Final 1

Report

Derry	2-11 (17) – (20) 2-14	Mayo
(HT: 2-03 – 1-07)
Gls: Oisin McWilliams, Callum Browne; Pts: Lorcan McWilliams (5, 3f), Ben McCarron (2, 1f), Declan Cassidy, Conor Doherty ('45), Shea Downey, Brian Cassidy		Gls: Paul Lambert, Ryan O’Donoghue; Pts: Ross Egan (5, 5f), Tommy Conroy (2), Oisin McLaughlin (2), John Gallagher (2), Paul Lambert, Evan O’Brien, Conor Diskin.

Páirc Seán Mac Diarmada, Carrick-on-Shannon
Referee: Paul Faloon (Down)

TG4

14 July 2018
16:00 IST (UTC+1)
Semi-Final 2

Report

Kildare	1-14 (17) – (16) 1-13	Kerry

Gaelic Grounds, Limerick
Referee: James Molloy (Galway)

=== Final ===
TG4

5 August 2018
13:15 IST (UTC+1)
Final

Report

Kildare	1-18 (21) – (19) 1-16	Mayo

Croke Park, Dublin
Referee: Niall Cullen (Fermanagh)
