= All-Ireland Under-20 Football Championship =

Dalata Hotel Group GAA Football Under-20 All-Ireland Championship
- Current season or competition: 2026 All-Ireland Under-20 Football Championship
- Irish: Craobh Peile Fé-20 na hÉireann
- Code: Gaelic football
- Founded: 1964; 62 years ago
- Region: Ireland (GAA)
- Trophy: Clarke Cup
- Title holders: Kerry (11th title)
- Most titles: Cork (12 titles)
- Sponsors: Dalata Hotel Group
- TV partner: TG4
- Official website: Official website

The GAA Football Under-20 All-Ireland Championship (known for sponsorship reasons as the Dalata Hotel Group GAA Football Under-20 All-Ireland Championship) is an annual inter-county Gaelic football competition organised by the Gaelic Athletic Association (GAA). It is the highest inter-county Gaelic football competition for male players between the ages of 17 and 20 in Ireland. The championship was contested as the All-Ireland Under-21 Championship between 1964 and 2017 before changing to an under-20 age category from 2018.

The final, usually held in May, serves as the culmination of a series of games played during the summer months, and the results determine which team receives the Clarke Cup. The All-Ireland Championship has always been played on a straight knockout basis whereby once a team loses they are eliminated from the championship.

Four teams currently participate in the All-Ireland Championship, with the most successful teams coming from the province of Munster. Teams representing this province have won a total of 22 All-Ireland titles.

The title has been won by 16 different teams, 10 of whom have won the title more than once. The all-time record-holders are Cork, who have won the championship on 12 occasions. Kerry are the current holders. The current Dalata Hotel Group Difference Maker of the Year, as selected by the Gaelic Writers Association, is Gearóid White from Kerry.

== Overview ==
The All-Ireland Under-21 Football Championship was created in 1964 in response to a Congress motion put forward by the Kerry County Board. Since then the competition has grown in importance and profile. The championship is run on an inter-county provincial basis with the winners from Munster, Leinster, Ulster and Connacht playing off against each other in two semi-finals. Cork are the most successful team in the history of the Under-21 Championship. Two teams have achieved three-in-a-rows; Kerry from 1975 to 1977 and Cork from 1984 to 1986. The coveted treble of winning the senior, under-21, and minor titles in the same year has been achieved on just one occasion, by Kerry in 1975. Because teams will only play together for at most, about two or three years, unlike the senior competition, it is unusual that one county will dominate for periods any longer than this.

It is usually considered the mark of a player to play for both a county's Under-21 and Senior team at the same time. Many players have achieved this, although one particular example would be Frank McGuigan, who, in 1973, represented Tyrone in the Ulster Finals of the Minors, Seniors and Under-21s.

== Roll of Honour ==
County	Titles	Runners-up	Years won	Years runner-up
Cork	12	5	1970, 1971, 1980, 1981, 1984, 1985, 1986, 1989, 1994, 2007, 2009, 2019	1965, 1979, 2006, 2013, 2016
Kerry	11	8	1964, 1973, 1975, 1976, 1977, 1990, 1995, 1996, 1998, 2008, 2026	1967, 1972, 1978, 1987, 1991, 1993, 1999, 2024
Tyrone	8	3	1991, 1992, 2000, 2001, 2015, 2022, 2024, 2025	1990, 2003, 2026
Galway	6	4	1972, 2002, 2005, 2011, 2013, 2020	1981, 1989, 1992, 2017
Mayo	5	7	1967, 1974, 1983, 2006, 2016	1973, 1984, 1994, 1995, 2001, 2004, 2018
Dublin	5	5	2003, 2010, 2012, 2014, 2017	1975, 1980, 2002, 2019, 2020
Kildare	3	4	1965, 2018, 2023	1966, 1976, 2008, 2022
Roscommon	2	5	1966, 1978	1969, 1982, 2012, 2014, 2021
Derry	2	2	1968, 1997	1983, 1985
Offaly	2	2	1988, 2021	1968, 1986
Donegal	2	1	1982, 1987	2010
Down	1	3	1979	1977, 2005, 2009
Antrim	1	1	1969	1974
Meath	1	1	1993	1997
Westmeath	1	0	1999	—
Armagh	1	0	2004	—
Laois	0	3	—	1964, 1998, 2007
Cavan	0	3	—	1988, 1996, 2011
Fermanagh	0	2	—	1970, 1971
Limerick	0	1	—	2000
Tipperary	0	1	—	2015
Sligo	0	1	—	2023
Louth	0	1	—	2025

== Appearances in final ==
County	Appearances	Wins	Runners-up
Cork	17	12	5
Kerry	19	11	8
Mayo	12	5	7
Galway	10	6	4
Dublin	10	5	5
Tyrone	11	8	3
Roscommon	7	2	5
Kildare	7	3	4
Derry	4	2	2
Offaly	4	2	2
Down	4	1	3
Donegal	3	2	1
Cavan	3	0	3
Laois	3	0	3
Antrim	2	1	1
Meath	2	1	1
Fermanagh	2	0	2
Armagh	1	1	0
Westmeath	1	1	0
Limerick	1	0	1
Tipperary	1	0	1
Sligo	1	0	1
Louth	1	0	1

== Finals listed by year ==
Under-20 Competition
Year	Winner	Score	Runner Up	Score
2026	Kerry	0-21	Tyrone	1-10
2025	Tyrone	5-16	Louth	0-17
2024	Tyrone	1-20	Kerry	1-14
2023	Kildare	1-17	Sligo	0-12
2022	Tyrone	1–20	Kildare	1–14
2021	Offaly	1–14	Roscommon	1–11
2020	Galway	1–11	Dublin	0–13
2019	Cork	3–16	Dublin	1–14
2018	Kildare	1–18	Mayo	1–16
Under-21 Competition
Year	Winner	Score	Runner Up	Score
2017	Dublin	2–13	Galway	2–07
2016	Mayo	5–07	Cork	1–14
2015	Tyrone	1–11	Tipperary	0–13
2014	Dublin	1–21	Roscommon	3–06
2013	Galway	1–14	Cork	1–11
2012	Dublin	2–12	Roscommon	0–11
2011	Galway	2–16	Cavan	1–09
2010	Dublin	1–10	Donegal	1–08
2009	Cork	1–13	Down	2–09
2008	Kerry	2–12	Kildare	0–11
2007	Cork	2–10	Laois	0–15
2006	Mayo	1–13	Cork	1–11
2005	Galway	6–05	Down	4–06
2004	Armagh	2–08	Mayo	1–09
2003	Dublin	0–12	Tyrone	0–07
2002	Galway	0–15	Dublin	0–07
2001	Tyrone	0–13	Mayo	0–10
2000	Tyrone	3–12	Limerick	0–13
1999	Westmeath	0–12	Kerry	0–09
1998	Kerry	2–08	Laois	0–11
1997	Derry	1–12	Meath	0–05
1996	Kerry	1–17	Cavan	2–10
1995	Kerry	2–12, 3–10 (R)	Mayo	3–09, 1–12 (R)
1994	Cork	1–12	Mayo	1–05
1993	Meath	1–08	Kerry	0–10
1992	Tyrone	1–10	Galway	1–07
1991	Tyrone	4–16	Kerry	1–05
1990	Kerry	5–12	Tyrone	2–11
1989	Cork	2–08	Galway	1–10
1988	Offaly	0–11	Cavan	0–09
1987	Donegal	1–07, 1–12 (R)	Kerry	0–10, 2-04 (R)
1986	Cork	3–16	Offaly	0–12
1985	Cork	0–14	Derry	1–08
1984	Cork	0–09	Mayo	0–06
1983	Mayo	2–05, 1-08 (R)	Derry	1–08, 1-05 (R)
1982	Donegal	0–08	Roscommon	0–05
1981	Cork	0–14, 2-09 (R)	Galway	2–08, 1-06 (R)
1980	Cork	2–08	Dublin	1–05
1979	Down	1–09	Cork	0–07
1978	Roscommon	1–09	Kerry	1–08
1977	Kerry	1–11	Down	1–05
1976	Kerry	0–14	Kildare	1–03
1975	Kerry	1–15	Dublin	0–10
1974	Mayo	0–09, 2–10 (R)	Antrim	0–09, 2-08 (R)
1973	Kerry	2–13	Mayo	0–13
1972	Galway	2–06	Kerry	0–07
1971	Cork	3–10	Fermanagh	0–03
1970	Cork	2–11	Fermanagh	0–09
1969	Antrim	1–08	Roscommon	0–10
1968	Derry	3–09	Offaly	1–09
1967	Mayo	2–10, 4-09 (R)	Kerry	2–10, 1-07 (R)
1966	Roscommon	2–10	Kildare	1–12
1965	Kildare	2–11	Cork	1–07
1964	Kerry	1–10	Laois	1–03
