= Connacht Under-20 Football Championship =

Gaelic football competition in Ireland

- Current season or competition: 2026 Connacht Under-20 Football Championship
- Irish: Craobh Peile Connachta Fé-20
- Code: Gaelic football
- Founded: 1964; 62 years ago
- Region: Connacht (GAA)
- Trophy: J. J. Fahy Cup
- No. of teams: 5
- Title holders: Roscommon (12th title)
- Most titles: Mayo (26 titles)
- Sponsors: EirGrid
- TV partner: TG4
- Official website: Connacht GAA website

The Connacht GAA Football Under-20 Championship, known simply as the Connacht Under-20 Championship, is an annual inter-county Gaelic football competition organised by the Connacht Council of the Gaelic Athletic Association (GAA). It is the highest inter-county football competition for male players between the ages of 17 and 20 in the province of Connacht. The championship was contested as the Connacht Under-21 Championship between 1964 and 2016 before changing to an under-20 age category from 2018. It is sponsored by EirGrid.

The final, currently held in March, serves as the culmination of a series of games played during a three-week period, and the results determine which team receives the J. J. Fahy Cup. The championship has always been played on a straight knockout basis whereby once a team loses they are eliminated from the championship.

The Connacht Championship is an integral part of the wider GAA Football Under-20 All-Ireland Championship. The winners of the Connacht final, like their counterparts in the other three provinces, advance to the semi-final stage of the All-Ireland series of games.

Five teams currently participate in the Connacht Championship. Galway are the most successful Connacht county with 6 All Ireland titles at the grade. Mayo have 26 titles Connacht, followed by Galway with 21 titles. The title has been won at least once by all five teams, with four of them winning the title more than once.

== Current format ==
=== Overview ===
The Connacht Championship is a single elimination tournament. Each team is afforded only one defeat before being eliminated from the championship. Pairings for matches are drawn at random and there is currently no seeding. Each match is played as a single leg. If a match is drawn there is a period of extra time, however, if both sides are still level at the end of extra time a replay takes place and so on until a winner is found.

=== Progression ===
	Teams entering in this round	Teams advancing from previous round
Quarter-final (2 teams)	2 teams drawn at random	
Semi-finals (4 teams)	3 teams who receive a bye at random	1 winner from the quarter-final
Final (2 teams)		2 winners from the semi-finals

=== Qualification for subsequent competitions ===
The Connacht Championship winners gain automatic entry to the semi-final stage of the All-Ireland Championship.

== Managers ==
Managers in the Connacht Championship are involved in the day-to-day running of the team, including the training, team selection, and sourcing of players from the club championships. Their influence varies from county-to-county and is related to the individual county boards. The manager is assisted by a team of two or three selectors and an extensive backroom team consisting of various coaches. The under-20 team manager also works closely with the senior team manager due to an overlap of players on both teams. Prior to the development of the concept of a manager in the 1970s, teams were usually managed by a team of selectors with one member acting as chairman.

Winning managers (2003-present)
Manager	Team	Wins	Winning years
Pat Holmes	Mayo	3	2006, 2007, 2008
Noel Connelly	Mayo	3	2006, 2007, 2008
John Maughan	Mayo	2	2003, 2004
Nigel Dineen	Roscommon	2	2012, 2014
Mike Solan	Mayo	2	2016, 2018
Peter Ford	Galway	1	2005
Michael Collins	Mayo	1	2009
Jimmy Jacquin	Roscommon	1	2010
Alan Mulholland	Galway	1	2011
Alan Flynn	Galway	1	2013
Mark Dowd	Roscommon	1	2015
Gerry Fahy	Galway	1	2017
Pádraic Joyce	Galway	1	2019
Donal Ó Fátharta	Galway	1	2020
Liam Tully	Roscommon	1	2021
Dessie Sloyan	Sligo	1	2022
Paul Henry	Sligo	1	2023
Noel Dunning	Roscommon	1	2024
Peadar Gardiner	Mayo	1	2025
Cian Smith	Roscommon	1	2026

== Roll of honour ==
#	County	Titles	Runners-up	Years won	Years Runners-up
1	Mayo	26	13	1967, 1968, 1970, 1971, 1973, 1974, 1975, 1976, 1980, 1983, 1984, 1985, 1986, 1994, 1995, 1997, 2001, 2003, 2004, 2006, 2007, 2008, 2009, 2016, 2018, 2025	1964, 1965, 1966, 1981, 1992, 1996, 2000, 2002, 2005, 2019, 2021, 2022, 2026
2	Galway	21	15	1964, 1965, 1972, 1979, 1981, 1987, 1988, 1989, 1990, 1992, 1993, 1996, 1998, 2000, 2002, 2005, 2011, 2013, 2017, 2019, 2020	1969, 1973, 1975, 1976, 1978, 1980, 1982, 1984, 1985, 1991, 1997, 2003, 2006, 2015, 2023, 2024
3	Roscommon	12	21	1966, 1969, 1978, 1982, 1999, 2010, 2012, 2014, 2015, 2021, 2024, 2026	1967, 1968, 1970, 1971, 1972, 1974, 1977, 1983, 1987, 1988, 1989, 1993, 2004, 2007, 2008, 2011, 2013, 2016, 2018, 2020, 2025,
4	Sligo	2	9	2022, 2023	1979, 1994, 1995, 1999, 2001, 2009, 2010, 2012, 2017
4	Leitrim	2	4	1977, 1991	1986, 1990, 1998, 2014

== List of finals ==
Year	Winners		Runners-up	
Year	County	Score	County	Score
2026	Roscommon	5-16 (AET)	Mayo	2-22 (AET)
2025	Mayo	2-17	Roscommon	4-08
2024	Roscommon	3–13	Galway	0–17
2023	Sligo	0-14	Galway	0-13
2022	Sligo	4-04	Mayo	1-12
2021	Roscommon	2-11	Mayo	1-07
2020	Galway	4-15	Roscommon	0-05
2019	Galway	0-16	Mayo	0-10
2018	Mayo	3-16	Roscommon	1-06
2017	Galway	3-20	Sligo	2-14
2016	Mayo	1-11	Roscommon	1-10
2015	Roscommon	3-14	Galway	3-11
2014	Roscommon	0–19	Leitrim	1-03
2013	Galway	1–17	Roscommon	2–11
2012	Roscommon	1–13	Sligo	0-08
2011	Galway	1–10	Roscommon	0-04
2010	Roscommon	1-06	Sligo	0-04
2009	Mayo	3–14	Sligo	1-08
2008	Mayo	1–14	Roscommon	0–14
2007	Mayo	1–22	Roscommon	1-08
2006	Mayo	0–15	Galway	1-05
2005	Galway	1–13	Mayo	0-04
2004	Mayo	0–16	Roscommon	0–13
2003	Mayo	1-09	Galway	0–11
2002	Galway	1-09	Mayo	1-08
2001	Mayo	0–15	Sligo	0-07
2000	Galway	1–12	Mayo	0–12
1999	Roscommon	1–12	Sligo	0-09
1998	Galway	0–13	Leitrim	1-07
1997	Mayo	0-07	Galway	0-06
1996	Galway	0–12	Mayo	0-05
1995	Mayo	1–10, 1–16 (R)	Sligo	1–10, 3–04 (R)
1994	Mayo	0–12	Sligo	0-06
1993	Galway	0–14	Roscommon	0-09
1992	Galway	1–10	Mayo	0–12
1991	Leitrim	1-07	Galway	0-09
1990	Galway	0-09	Leitrim	0-05
1989	Galway	1–13	Roscommon	0-03
1988	Galway	0–10	Roscommon	0-06
1987	Galway	1–10	Roscommon	0–10
1986	Mayo	0–12	Leitrim	0-05
1985	Mayo	2-06	Galway	0-07
1984	Mayo	2-07	Galway	2-04
1983	Mayo	1–19	Roscommon	1-06
1982	Roscommon	1–10	Galway	0-05
1981	Galway	0-09	Mayo	0-08
1980	Mayo	4–11	Galway	1-05
1979	Galway	0–12	Sligo	0-09
1978	Roscommon	3-09	Galway	2–11
1977	Leitrim	1-03	Roscommon	0-05
1976	Mayo	1-08	Galway	0-02
1975	Mayo	2–10	Galway	0-09
1974	Mayo	1–12	Roscommon	0-09
1973	Mayo	1-07	Galway	0-05
1972	Galway	0–16	Roscommon	0-05
1971	Mayo	5–10	Roscommon	0-08
1970	Mayo	0–14	Roscommon	1–10
1969	Roscommon	1-09, 1–10 (R, AET)	Galway	0–12, 2–03 (R, AET)
1968	Mayo	1–13	Roscommon	2-03
1967	Mayo	3–11	Roscommon	2-08
1966	Roscommon	1–15	Mayo	0-09
1965	Galway	3-09	Mayo	1–13
1964	Galway	3-06	Mayo	3-05

== Records and statistics ==
=== Final ===
==== Team ====
- Most titles: 26:
  - Mayo (1967, 1968, 1970, 1971, 1973, 1974, 1975, 1976, 1980, 1983, 1984, 1985, 1986, 1994, 1995, 1997, 2001, 2003, 2004, 2006, 2007, 2008, 2009, 2016, 2018, 2025)
- Most consecutive title wins: 4:
  - Mayo (1973, 1974, 1975, 1976)
  - Mayo (1983, 1984, 1985, 1986)
  - Mayo (2006, 2007, 2008, 2009)
- Most appearances in a final: 35:
  - Galway (1964, 1965, 1969, 1972, 1973, 1975, 1976, 1978, 1979, 1980, 1981, 1982, 1984, 1985, 1987, 1988, 1989, 1990, 1991, 1992, 1993, 1996, 1997, 1998, 2000, 2002, 2003, 2005, 2006, 2011, 2013, 2015, 2017, 2019, 2020)
- Most appearances in a final without winning: 9:
  - Sligo (1979, 1994, 1995, 1999, 2001, 2009, 2010, 2012, 2017)

=== Teams ===
==== By decade ====
The most successful team of each decade, judged by number of Connacht Championship titles, is as follows:

- 1960s: 2 each for Galway (1964-65), Roscommon (1966-69) and Mayo (1967-68)
- 1970s: 6 for Mayo (1970-71-73-74-75-76)
- 1980s: 5 for Mayo (1980-83-84-85-86)
- 1990s: 5 for Galway (1990-92-93-96-98)
- 2000s: 7 for Mayo (2001-03-04-06-07-08-09)
- 2010s: 4 each for Roscommon (2010-12-14-15) and Galway (2011-13-17-19)

==== Gaps ====
Top three longest gaps between successive championship titles:

- 17 years: Roscommon (1982-1999)
- 14 years: Leitrim (1977-1991)
- 11 years: Roscommon (1999-2010)

== Sources ==
- History of Connacht GAA (2002)
- Roll of Honour on gaainfo.com
