= Oliver Kilmurray =

Irish Gaelic footballer (1947–2025)

Personal information
- Native name: Oilibhéar Mac Giolla Mhuire (Irish)
- Nickname: Ollie
- Born: 1947 Daingean, County Offaly, Ireland
- Died: May 2025 (aged 78) New York City, United States

Sport
- Sport: Gaelic football
- Position: Midfield
Club
- Years: Club
- Daingean
Club titles
- Offaly titles: 1
Inter-county
Years	County	Apps (scores)
1965–1966	Offaly	2 (1-01)
Inter-county titles
- Leinster titles: 0
- All-Irelands: 0
- NFL: 0

Oliver Kilmurray (1948 – May 2025) was an Irish Gaelic footballer. At club level, he played with Daingean and at inter-county level with the Offaly senior football team.

== Career ==
Kilmurray played Gaelic football as a student at all levels during his time as a boarder at Belcamp College in Dublin. He was part of the college's team that won the Leinster Colleges SFC in 1965, before losing the subsequent All-Ireland final to St Columb's College after a replay.

At club level, Kilmurray first played for Daingean in the juvenile and underage grades. He was 15-years-old when he lined out at midfield in a controversial Offaly MFC final. Kilmurray progressed to adult level and won an Offaly SFC medal in 1965 after a two-point win over Gracefield.

Kilmurray first appeared on the inter-county scene with Offaly during a three-year tenure with the minor team. He was at midfield when Offaly beat Cork by 0–15 to 0–11 in the 1965 All-Ireland minor final, while he also won consecutive Leinster MFC medals. Kilmurray made his senior team debut in October 1965, however, his inter-county career was cut short as result of his emigration to the United States. His brother, Kevin Kilmurray, won consecutive All-Ireland SFC medals with Offaly.

== Death ==
Kilmurray's death was announced in May 2025.

== Honours ==
Belcamp College

- Leinster Colleges Senior Football Championship: 1965

Daingean

- Offaly Senior Football Championship: 1965

Offaly

- All-Ireland Minor Football Championship: 1964
- Leinster Minor Football Championship: 1964, 1965
