= 1999–2000 National Football League (Ireland) =

Gaelic football competition

1999-2000 National Football League
League details
- Dates: 31 October 1999 - 20 May 2000
- Teams: 33

League champions
- Winners: Derry (5th win)
- Captain: Anthony Tohill
- Manager: Eamonn Coleman

League runners-up
- Runners-up: Meath
- Captain: Graham Geraghty
- Manager: Seán Boylan

Other division winners
- Division 2: Louth

The 1999-2000 National Football League, known for sponsorship reasons as the Church & General National Football League, was the 69th staging of the National Football League (NFL), an annual Gaelic football tournament for the Gaelic Athletic Association county teams of Ireland. Derry beat Meath in the final after a replay.

== Format ==
=== League structure ===
The top 16 teams were drawn into Divisions 1A and 1B. The other 16 teams were drawn into Divisions 2A and 2B. Each team played all the other teams in its section once: either home or away. Teams earned 2 points for a win and 1 for a draw.

=== Finals, promotions and relegations ===
The top two teams in Divisions 2A and 2B progressed to the Division 2 semi-finals and were promoted to Division 1. The bottom two teams in Divisions 1A and 1B were relegated. The top two teams in Divisions 1A and 1B progressed to the NFL semi-finals.

=== Tie-breaker ===
If two or more teams are level on points, scoring average was used to rank the teams.

== Division 1 ==
=== Division 1A Table ===
Compete in Division 1 semi-finals Automatic relegation to Division 2A

Team	Pld	W	D	L	F	A	Diff	Pts
Kerry	7	5	0	2	9-95	6-63	41	10
Roscommon	7	5	0	2	6-71	6-61	10	10
Dublin	7	5	0	2	6-73	3-80	2	10
Galway	7	4	1	2	5-92	9-65	15	9
Donegal	7	2	1	4	3-73	3-81	-8	5
Tyrone	7	2	1	4	5-73	4-86	-10	5
Armagh	7	1	2	4	4-58	6-75	-23	4
Cork	7	1	1	5	6-57	7-81	-27	3

=== Division 1A Rounds 1 to 7 ===
30/10/99; Round 1	Cork	0-7 - 0-19	Kerry	Páirc Uí Rinn, Cork

31/10/99; Round 1	Galway	1-15 - 1-8	Roscommon	Dunlo GAA Grounds, Ballinasloe

31/10/99; Round 1	Tyrone	1-13 - 0-9	Dublin	Healy Park, Omagh

31/10/99; Round 1	Armagh	0-9 - 0-10	Donegal	Athletic Grounds, Armagh

14/11/99; Round 2	Donegal	0-7 - 0-14	Galway	MacCumhail Park, Ballybofey

14/11/99; Round 2	Dublin	0-14 - 0-6	Armagh	Parnell Park, Dublin

14/11/99; Round 2	Kerry	2-19 - 1-8	Tyrone	Austin Stack Park, Tralee

14/11/99; Round 2	Roscommon	1-12 - 3-4	Cork	Dr. Hyde Park, Roscommon

28/11/99; Round 3	Cork	0-7 - 2-12	Donegal	Páirc Uí Chaoimh, Cork

28/11/99; Round 3	Dublin	1-8 - 0-9	Kerry	Parnell Park, Dublin

05/12/99; Round 3	Tyrone	0-11 - 2-8	Roscommon	O'Neill Park, Dungannon

12/12/99; Round 3	Armagh	2-7 - 1-10	Galway	St. Oliver Plunkett Park, Crossmaglen

13/02/00; Round 4	Kerry	3-16 - 2-8	Armagh	Fitzgerald Stadium, Killarney

13/02/00; Round 4	Roscommon	1-10 - 0-6	Dublin	Dr. Hyde Park, Roscommon

13/02/00; Round 4	Galway	1-9 - 2-9	Cork	St Jarlath's Park, Tuam

13/02/00; Round 4	Donegal	0-10 - 0-10	Tyrone	MacCumhail Park, Ballybofey

05/03/00; Round 5	Kerry	1-8 - 0-9	Roscommon	Fitzgerald Stadium, Killarney

05/03/00; Round 5	Tyrone	1-11 - 0-15	Galway	Healy Park, Omagh

05/03/00; Round 5	Dublin	1-11 - 0-11	Donegal	Parnell Park, Dublin

05/03/00; Round 5	Armagh	0-7 - 0-7	Cork	St. Oliver Plunkett Park, Crossmaglen

18/03/00; Round 6	Galway	0-20 - 2-15	Dublin	St Jarlath's Park, Tuam

26/03/00; Round 6	Cork	0-12 - 1-12	Tyrone	Páirc Uí Chaoimh, Cork

26/03/00; Round 6	Donegal	0-14 - 2-16	Kerry	Fr Tierney Park, Ballyshannon

26/03/00; Round 6	Roscommon	1-10 - 0-8	Armagh	Dr. Hyde Park, Roscommon

09/04/00; Round 7	Kerry	1-8 - 2-9	Galway	Austin Stack Park, Tralee

09/04/00; Round 7	Roscommon	0-14 - 1-9	Donegal	Dr. Hyde Park, Roscommon

09/04/00; Round 7	Dublin	2-10 - 1-11	Cork	Parnell Park, Dublin

09/04/00; Round 7	Tyrone	1-8 - 0-13	Armagh	O'Neill Park, Dungannon

=== Division 1B Table ===
Compete in Division 1 semi-finals Automatic relegation to Division 2B

Team	Pld	W	D	L	F	A	Diff	Pts
Derry	7	5	2	0	5-77	2-56	30	12
Meath	7	3	2	2	7-77	6-78	2	8
Sligo	7	4	0	3	8-63	5-71	1	8
Fermanagh	7	4	0	3	2-78	6-76	-10	8
Mayo	7	3	0	4	5-65	3-66	5	6
Clare	7	2	2	3	4-64	3-68	-1	6
Kildare	7	1	2	4	4-70	7-72	-11	4
Down	7	1	2	4	5-64	8-71	-16	4

=== Division 1B Rounds 1 to 7 ===
31/10/99; Round 1	Meath	0-13 - 0-11	Clare	Páirc Tailteann, Navan

31/10/99; Round 1	Fermanagh	1-14 - 0-13	Sligo	Brewster Park, Enniskillen

31/10/99; Round 1	Down	0-10 - 1-10	Kildare	Páirc Esler, Newry

31/10/99; Round 1	Derry	0-10 - 0-6	Mayo	Celtic Park, Derry

14/11/99; Round 2	Kildare	1-10 - 2-7	Derry	St Conleth's Park, Newbridge

14/11/99; Round 2	Sligo	3-11 - 2-13	Meath	Markievicz Park, Sligo

14/11/99; Round 2	Mayo	1-15 - 0-9	Fermanagh	Crossmolina Deel Rovers GAA Ground, Crossmolina

14/11/99; Round 2	Clare	1-10 - 1-10	Down	Kilmihil GAA Pitch, Kilmihil

28/11/99; Round 3	Down	0-10 - 2-6	Sligo	Páirc Esler, Newry

28/11/99; Round 3	Derry	0-7 - 0-4	Clare	Celtic Park, Derry

12/12/99; Round 3	Fermanagh	0-14 - 0-7	Meath	Brewster Park, Enniskillen

19/12/99; Round 3	Mayo	1-10 - 0-10	Kildare	MacHale Park, Castlebar

13/02/00; Round 4	Meath	1-12 - 2-9	Down	Páirc Tailteann, Navan

13/02/00; Round 4	Kildare	1-9 - 0-13	Fermanagh	St Conleth's Park, Newbridge

13/02/00; Round 4	Clare	0-13 - 0-9	Mayo	Kilmihil GAA Pitch, Kilmihil

13/02/00; Round 4	Sligo	0-9 - 0-10	Derry	Markievicz Park, Sligo

05/03/00; Round 5	Mayo	0-7 - 1-7	Sligo	Fr O'Hara Park, Charlestown

05/03/00; Round 5	Kildare	0-13 - 1-10	Clare	St Conleth's Park, Newbridge

05/03/00; Round 5	Derry	0-13 - 1-10	Meath	Celtic Park, Derry

05/03/00; Round 5	Fermanagh	0-9 - 1-11	Down	Brewster Park, Enniskilen

25/03/00; Round 6	Meath	1-10 - 1-9	Mayo	Páirc Tailteann, Navan

25/03/00; Round 6	Clare	1-6 - 1-9	Fermanagh	Kilmihil GAA Pitch, Kilmihil

25/03/00; Round 6	Down	0-7 - 1-15	Derry	St Patrick's Park, Newcastle

26/03/00; Round 6	Sligo	1-10 - 1-7	Kildare	Markievicz Park, Sligo

09/04/00; Round 7	Kildare	0-11 - 2-12	Meath	St Conleth's Park, Newbridge

09/04/00; Round 7	Derry	2-15 - 0-10	Fermanagh	Celtic Park, Derry

09/04/00; Round 7	Mayo	2-9 - 1-7	Down	St Stephen's Park, Ballina

09/04/00; Round 7	Clare	1-10 - 1-7	Sligo	Cusack Park, Ennis

=== Division 1 Semi-finals ===
23/04/00; Semi-final	Meath	4-11 - 1-18	Kerry	Semple Stadium, Thurles

23/04/00; Semi-final	Derry	0-15 - 0-08	Roscommon	St Tiernach's Park, Clones

=== Division 1 Final ===
07/05/00; Final	Derry	1-12 - 1-12	Meath	Croke Park, Dublin; Attendance: 25,743; Referee: Michael Curley (Galway)

20/05/00; Final replay	Derry	1-08 - 0-09	Meath	St Tiernach's Park, Clones; Referee: Paddy Russell (Tipperary)

== Division 2 ==
=== Division 2A Table ===
Compete in Division 2 semi-finals and automatic promotion to Division 1A

Team	Pld	W	D	L	F	A	Diff	Pts
Offaly	7	7	0	0	9-76	4-58	33	14
Louth	7	6	0	1	12-99	7-72	42	12
Wicklow	7	5	0	2	8-74	2-68	24	10
Antrim	7	4	0	3	6-72	2-70	14	8
Leitrim	7	3	0	4	7-78	8-78	-3	6
Westmeath	7	2	0	5	5-74	8-66	-1	4
Limerick	7	1	0	6	4-65	11-86	-42	2
London	7	0	0	7	4-54	13-94	-67	0

=== Division 2A Rounds 1 to 7 ===
31/10/99; Round 1	Offaly	1-16 - 2-11	Louth	O'Connor Park, Tullamore

31/10/99; Round 1	Limerick	0-10 - 1-12	Westmeath	Kevin Long Park, Feenagh

31/10/99; Round 1	London	0-11 - 1-11	Wicklow	Emerald GAA Grounds, Ruislip

31/10/99; Round 1	Leitrim	0-7 - 2-11	Antrim	Casement Park, Belfast

14/11/99; Round 2	Westmeath	3-18 - 0-3	London	Cusack Park, Mullingar

14/11/99; Round 2	Leitrim	1-19 - 1-8	Limerick	Páirc Seán Mac Diarmada, Carrick-on-Shannon

14/11/99; Round 2	Louth	1-15 - 0-11	Antrim	Drogheda Park, Drogheda

14/11/99; Round 2	Wicklow	0-8 - 0-10	Offaly	Aughrim County Ground, Aughrim

28/11/99; Round 3	Limerick	1-9 - 3-14	Louth	FitzGerald Park, Kilmallock

28/11/99; Round 3	London	1-9 - 2-13	Leitrim	Emerald GAA Grounds, Ruislip

28/11/99; Round 3	Offaly	0-9 - 0-4	Antrim	O'Connor Park, Tullamore

05/12/99; Round 3	Wicklow	3-11 - 0-5	Westmeath	Aughrim County Ground, Aughrim

13/02/00; Round 4	Antrim	2-14 - 0-10	Limerick	Casement Park, Belfast

13/02/00; Round 4	Louth	1-19 - 2-8	London	Drogheda Park, Drogheda

13/02/00; Round 4	Leitrim	0-13 - 1-13	Wicklow	Páirc Seán Mac Diarmada, Carrick-on-Shannon

13/02/00; Round 4	Westmeath	0-8 - 1-7	Offaly	Cusack Park, Mullingar

04/03/00; Round 5	London	0-7 - 1-11	Antrim	Emerald GAA Grounds, Ruislip

05/03/00; Round 5	Offaly	2-9 - 0-11	Limerick	O'Connor Park, Tullamore

05/03/00; Round 5	Wicklow	1-7 - 0-12	Louth	Aughrim County Ground, Aughrim

05/03/00; Round 5	Westmeath	0-11 - 1-9	Leitrim	Cusack Park, Mullingar

25/03/00; Round 6	Leitrim	1-9 - 1-12	Offaly	Páirc Seán Mac Diarmada, Carrick-on-Shannon

25/03/00; Round 6	Antrim	1-9 - 0-15	Wicklow	Casement Park, Belfast

25/03/00; Round 6	Limerick	1-9 - 0-9	London	Gaelic Grounds, Limerick

26/03/00; Round 6	Louth	3-14 - 0-13	Westmeath	Drogheda Park, Drogheda

09/04/00; Round 7	Westmeath	1-7 - 0-12	Antrim	St Lomans GAA Pitch, Mullingar

09/04/00; Round 7	Wicklow	2-9 - 1-8	Limerick	Aughrim County Ground, Aughrim

09/04/00; Round 7	Leitrim	2-8 - 2-14	Louth	Páirc Seán Mac Diarmada, Carrick-on-Shannon

09/04/00; Round 7	London	1-7 - 4-13	Offaly	Emerald GAA Grounds, Ruislip

=== Division 2B Table ===
Compete in Division 2 semi-finals and automatic promotion to Division 1B

Team	Pld	W	D	L	F	A	Diff	Pts
Laois	7	7	0	0	6-87	2-57	42	14
Cavan	7	4	0	3	10-86	8-68	24	8
Monaghan	7	4	0	3	6-78	7-64	11	8
Longford	7	4	0	3	8-74	4-87	-1	8
Wexford	7	3	0	4	8-76	12-68	-4	6
Tipperary	7	2	0	5	10-47	3-82	-14	4
Waterford	7	2	0	5	4-71	11-70	-20	4
Carlow	7	2	0	5	7-60	12-83	-38	4

=== Division 2B Rounds 1 to 7 ===
31/10/99; Round 1	Wexford	4-13 - 1-4	Waterford	St Patrick's Park, Enniscorthy

31/10/99; Round 1	Carlow	2-12 - 2-10	Longford	Dr. Cullen Park, Carlow

31/10/99; Round 1	Laois	1-12 - 1-4	Tipperary	O'Moore Park, Portlaoise

31/10/99; Round 1	Cavan	1-9 - 1-16	Monaghan	Breffni Park, Cavan

14/11/99; Round 2	Tipperary	2-11 - 0-10	Carlow	Ardfinnan GAA Ground, Ardfinnan

14/11/99; Round 2	Waterford	2-9 - 2-11	Cavan	O'Neill Park, Dungannon

14/11/99; Round 2	Longford	1-11 - 0-11	Wexford	Pearse Park, Longford

14/11/99; Round 2	Monaghan	0-11 - 0-12	Laois	Páirc Mhuire, Scotstown

28/11/99; Round 3	Carlow	2-7 - 2-6	Monaghan	Dr. Cullen Park, Carlow

28/11/99; Round 3	Wexford	1-11 - 2-6	Tipperary	O'Kennedy Park, New Ross

28/11/99; Round 3	Waterford	0-14 - 2-6	Longford	Fraher Field, Dungarvan

28/11/99; Round 3	Cavan	0-5 - 1-10	Laois	Breffni Park, Cavan

13/02/00; Round 4	Longford	2-11 - 0-16	Cavan	Pearse Park, Longford

13/02/00; Round 4	Laois	1-13 - 0-7	Carlow	O'Moore Park, Portlaoise

13/02/00; Round 4	Monaghan	1-10 - 1-9	Wexford	Páirc Mhuire, Scotstown

13/02/00; Round 4	Tipperary	1-9 - 0-11	Waterford	Clonmel GAA Ground, Clonmel

04/03/00; Round 5	Waterford	0-9 - 1-13	Monaghan	Fraher Field, Dungarvan

05/03/00; Round 5	Cavan	3-15 - 1-8	Carlow	Breffni Park, Cavan

05/03/00; Round 5	Wexford	1-7 - 1-14	Laois	Páirc Uí Shiochain, Gorey

05/03/00; Round 5	Longford	0-12 - 1-7	Tipperary	Pearse Park, Longford

25/03/00; Round 6	Carlow	2-8 - 1-15	Wexford	Dr. Cullen Park, Carlow

25/03/00; Round 6	Tipperary	1-4 - 0-15	Cavan	Páirc Shaleain, Templemore

26/03/00; Round 6	Laois	1-10 - 0-11	Waterford	O'Moore Park, Portlaoise

26/03/00; Round 6	Monaghan	0-11 - 1-12	Longford	Páirc Mhuire, Scotstown

09/04/00; Round 7	Longford	0-12 - 1-16	Laois	Pearse Park, Longford

09/04/00; Round 7	Tipperary	2-6 - 1-11	Monaghan	Sean Treacy Park, Tipperary

09/04/00; Round 7	Waterford	1-13 - 0-8	Carlow	Fraher Field, Dungarvan

09/04/00; Round 7	Wexford	0-10 - 4-15	Cavan	O'Kennedy Park, New Ross

=== Division 2 Semi-finals ===
23/04/00; Semi-final	Offaly	1-11 - 0-10	Cavan	Cusack Park, Mullingar

23/04/00; Semi-final	Louth	0-13 - 1-08	Laois	Cusack Park, Mullingar

=== Division 2 Final ===
7 May 2000; 2pm	Louth	1-13 - 0-13	Offaly	Croke Park, Dublin; Referee: Brian Crowe (Cavan); Man of the Match: Simon Gerrard
7 May 2000; 2pm	Stanfield (0-4), Gerrard (1-0), Rooney (0-3, 1f), Farrelly (0-2), McGinnity (0-1), Kirwan (0-1), D. Reilly (0-1), C. O'Hanlon (0-1)		McManus (0-5f), Farrell (0-4), Quinn (0-2f), Claffey (0-1), R. Malone (0-1)	Croke Park, Dublin; Referee: Brian Crowe (Cavan); Man of the Match: Simon Gerrard

GK	1	Colm Nally (Newtown Blues)
RCB	2	Breen Phillips (Newtown Blues)
FB	3	Stephen Melia (St Joseph's)
LCB	4	Brendan Reilly (John Mitchels)
RHB	5	Peter McGinnity (Dundalk Gaels)
CHB	6	Aaron Hoey (St Bride's)
LHB	7	Simon Gerrard (Newtown Blues)
MF	8	Séamus O'Hanlon (Clan na Gael)
MF	9	Martin Farrelly (Lann Léire)
RHF	10	Mark Stanfield (O'Connells)
CHF	11	Nicky Malone (Lann Léire) (c)
LHF	12	Ollie McDonnell (St Joseph's)
RCF	13	David Reilly (St Joseph's)
FF	14	Darren Kirwan (St Patrick's)
LCF	15	JP Rooney (Naomh Máirtín)
Substitutes:
	16	Cathal O'Hanlon (Clan na Gael) for David Reilly
	17	Paddy McGuigan (Dreadnots) for Séamus O'Hanlon
	18	Christy Grimes (Mattock Rangers) for Kirwan
	19	Séamus O'Hanlon for McDonnell

GK	1	Pádraic Kelly (Shamrocks)
RCB	2	Cathal Daly (Tullamore)
FB	3	Barry Malone (Rhode)
LCB	4	James Brady (Gracefield)
RHB	5	Joe Kilmurray (Rhode)
CHB	6	Seán Grennan (Ferbane) (c)
LHB	7	Finbarr Cullen (Edenderry)
MF	8	James Grennan (Ferbane)
MF	9	Ronan Mooney (Shamrocks)
RHF	10	Colm Quinn (Ballycumber)
CHF	11	Vinny Claffey (Doon)
LHF	12	Ciarán McManus (Tubber)
RCF	13	Paschal Kellaghan (Rhode)
FF	14	Roy Malone (Rhode)
LCF	15	David Connolly (Bracknagh)
Substitutes:
	16	Cillian Farrell (Edenderry) for Kellaghan
	17	John Ryan (Shannonbridge) for R. Malone
	18	Barry Mooney (Shamrocks) for Connolly
	19	Donie Ryan (Doon) for Quinn

== Statistics ==
- All scores correct as of 12 March 2016

=== Scoring ===
- Widest winning margin: 24
  - Westmeath 3-18 - 0-3 London (Division 2a)
- Most goals in a match: 5
  - Wexford 4-13 - 1-4 Waterford (Division 2b)
  - London 1-7 - 4-13 Offaly (Division 2a)
  - Kerry 3-16 - 2-8 Armagh (Division 1a)
  - Sligo 3-11 - 2-13 Meath (Division 1b)
- Most points in a match: 35
  - Galway 0-20 - 2-15 Dublin (Division 1a)
- Most goals by one team in a match: 4
  - Wexford 4-13 - 1-4 Waterford (Division 2b)
  - Wexford 0-10 - 4-15 Cavan (Division 2b)
  - London 1-7 - 4-13 Offaly (Division 2a)
- Highest aggregate score: 41 points
  - Galway 0-20 - 2-15 Dublin (Division 1a)
- Lowest aggregate score: 11 points
  - Derry 0-7 - 0-4 Clare (Division 1b)
