= Martin Heavey =

Irish Gaelic footballer (1941–2024)

Personal information
- Native name: Máirtín Ó hÉimhigh (Irish)
- Born: 8 October 1941 Rhode, County Offaly, Ireland
- Died: 4 August 2024 (aged 82) Rhode, County Offaly, Ireland
- Occupation: ESB employee
- Height: 5 ft 8 in (173 cm)

Sport
- Sport: Gaelic football
- Position: Right wing-back
Club
- Years: Club
- Rhode
Club titles
- Offaly titles: 3
Inter-county
Years	County	Apps (scores)
1967–1973	Offaly	14 (0–0)
Inter-county titles
- Leinster titles: 3
- All-Irelands: 2
- NFL: 0
- All Stars: 0

Martin Heavey (8 October 1941 – 4 August 2024) was an Irish Gaelic football player, selector and administrator. At club level he played with Rhode and at inter-county level with the Offaly senior team.

== Playing career ==
Heavey first played Gaelic football at club level with Rhode. He was part of the club's senior team that won back-to-back Offaly SFC titles in 1966 and 1967 after respective defeats of Clara and Daingean. Heavey won a third and final Offaly SFC medal following a defeat of Erin Rovers in the 1969 final replay.

Heavey never played at minor, under-21 or junior levels for Offaly, but made his debut for the senior team in a National Football League defeat of Wicklow in October 1967. He was dropped from the team for the following two years, but returned as a regular player in 1970. Heavey won back-to-back All-Ireland SFC medals in 1971 and 1972 following Offaly's breakthrough in the competition. He won a third successive Leinster SFC medal in 1973. Heavey made his last appearance for Offaly in December 1973.

== Coaching career ==
Heavey first became involved in coaching during his playing days when he served as a selector with Offaly's first under-14 team in 1972. He later spent over 20 years as an underage coach with the Rhode club. Heavey became an Offaly senior team selector under Paddy McCormack and Eugene McGee between 1975 and 1977.

== Personal life and death ==
Heavey spent his working life as an ESB employee at Rhode Power Station. His brother, Bill Heavey, also played Gaelic football for Rhode and had a brief spell with the Offaly senior team.

Heavey died on 4 August 2024, at the age of 82.

== Honours ==
Rhode

- Offaly Senior Football Championship: 1966, 1967, 1969

Offaly

- All-Ireland Senior Football Championship: 1971, 1972
- Leinster Senior Football Championship: 1971, 1972, 1973
