= Jody Gunning =

Irish Gaelic football manager and player

Personal information
- Native name: Seosamh Ó Conaing (Irish)
- Born: 1946 (age 79–80) Rhode, County Offaly, Ireland
- Height: 5 ft 8 in (173 cm)

Sport
- Sport: Gaelic football
- Position: Left wing-forward
Club
- Years: Club
- Rhode
Club titles
- Offaly titles: 4
Inter-county
Years	County	Apps (scores)
1966–1972	Offaly	10 (0-04)
Inter-county titles
- Leinster titles: 2
- All-Irelands: 2
- NFL: 0
- All Stars: 0

Jody Gunning (born 1946) is an Irish Gaelic football manager and former player. At club level, he played with Rhode and at inter-county level with the Offaly senior football team.

== Playing career ==
At club level, Gunning first played for Rhode in the juvenile and underage grades. After captaining the club's under-21 team to the Offaly U21FC title, he subsequently progressed to adult level. Gunning won four Offaly SFC medals between 1966 and 1975.

Gunning first appeared on the inter-county scene with Offaly as a member of the minor team. He was at left wing-forward when Offaly beat Cork by 0-15 to 0-11 in the 1965 All-Ireland minor final. Gunning immediately progressed to the under-21 team before making his senior team debut in November 1966. He was corner-forward when Offaly won their first All-Ireland SFC title, beating Galway in the 1971 All-Ireland final. Gunning won a second All-Ireland winners' medal in 1972.

== Management career ==
Gunning served as a coach and manager at all levels with Rhode. He later held similar roles with various Offaly teams. Gunning managed the Offaly under-21 team to the Leinster U21FC and All-Ireland U21FC title in 1988. He later served as senior team manager.

== Honours ==
=== Player ===
Rhode

- Offaly Senior Football Championship: 1966, 1967, 1969, 1975
- Offaly Under-21 Football Championship: 1967 (c)

Offaly

- All-Ireland Senior Football Championship: 1971, 1972
- Leinster Senior Football Championship: 1971, 1972
- All-Ireland Minor Football Championship: 1964
- Leinster Minor Football Championship: 1964

=== Management ===
Offaly

- All-Ireland Under-21 Football Championship: 1988
- Leinster Under-21 Football Championship: 1988
