= Paddy Kerrigan =

Irish Gaelic football player (1928–2022)

Personal information
- Native name: Pádraig Ó Ciaragáin (Irish)
- Nickname: Pilot
- Born: 28 January 1928 Rhode, County Offaly, Ireland
- Died: 3 September 2022 (aged 94) Tullamore, County Offaly, Ireland
- Occupation: Mechanic

Sport
- Sport: Gaelic football
- Position: Right corner-forward
Club
- Years: Club
- Rhode
Club titles
- Offaly titles: 2
Inter-county
- Years: County
- 1953: Offaly
Inter-county titles
- Leinster titles: 0
- All-Irelands: 0
- NFL: 0

Patrick Kerrigan (28 January 1928 – 3 September 2022) was an Irish Gaelic football player and trainer. At club level he played with Rhode and was also a member of the Offaly senior football team. Kerrigan later served as trainer with Rhode and Walsh Island.

== Career ==
Kerrigan first played Gaelic football at juvenile and underage levels with the Rhode club. He eventually progressed onto the club's senior team and won Offaly SFC titles in 1948, 1955 and 1958. At inter-county level, Kerrigan made one appearance for Offaly in a Leinster SFC defeat by Wexford in 1953.

Kerrigan's coaching career began at club level when he took charge of Rhode in 1960. He guided the club to four Offaly SFC titles between 1966 and 1975. Kerrigan subsequently coached the Walsh Island team to a record-breaking six successive Offaly SFC titles, as well as consecutive Leinster Club Championships.

== Death ==
Kerrigan died at the Midland Regional Hospital in Tullamore on 3 September 2022, at the age of 94.

== Honours ==
=== Player ===
Rhode

- Offaly Senior Football Championship: 1948, 1955, 1958

=== Coach ===
Rhode

- Offaly Senior Football Championship: 1966, 1967, 1969, 1975
- Offaly Under-21 Football Championship: 1966, 1975

Walsh Island

- Leinster Senior Club Football Championship: 1978, 1979
- Offaly Senior Football Championship: 1978, 1979, 1980, 1981, 1982, 1983
