= 2017 Offaly Senior Football Championship =

Offaly S.F.C.
- Season: 2017
- Champions: Rhode (28th Title)
- Relegated: St Rynagh's
- All Ireland SCFC: n/a
- Winning Captain: Anton Sullivan and Niall McNamee
- Man of the Match: Gárbhan Harraghy
- Winning Manager: Pascal Kelleghan
- Leinster SCFC: ???
- Matches: 56

The 2017 Offaly Senior Football Championship was the 120th edition of Offaly GAA's premier Gaelic football competition for senior graded clubs in County Offaly, Ireland. Eight teams compete, with the winner representing Offaly in the Leinster Senior Club Football Championship.

The championship starts a league stage and progresses to a knockout stage.

Rhode were the defending champions after they defeated Ferbane in the previous years final.

This was Cappincur's return to the senior grade after claiming the 2016 Offaly Senior B Football Championship title.

St Rynagh's were relegated to the 2018 S.B.F.C. after 7 years in the top-flight.

== Team changes ==
The following teams have changed division since the 2016 championship season.

=== To S.F.C. ===
Promoted from 2016 Offaly Senior B Football Championship

- Cappincur – (Intermediate Champions)

=== From S.F.C. ===
Relegated to 2017 Offaly Senior B Football Championship

- Ballycumber

== League Phase ==
The top two in the group went directly to the semi-final. The third through sixth place teams contested the quarter-finals. The two bottom finishers qualified for the Relegation Final.

Team	Pld	W	L	D	PF	PA	PD	Pts
Rhode	7	7	0	0	116	83	+83	14
Ferbane	7	5	1	1	124	94	+30	11
Tullamore	7	3	2	2	101	97	+4	8
Clara	7	4	3	0	106	96	+10	8
Edenderry	7	3	3	1	109	93	+16	7
Gracefield	7	2	5	0	101	98	+3	3
Cappincur	7	1	6	0	83	126	-43	2
St Rynagh's	7	1	6	0	63	116	-53	2

Round 1

- Tullamore 4-15, 2-6 Cappincur, 8/4/2017,
- Clara 2-9, 0-13 Edenderry, 8/4/2017,
- Rhode 0-17, 0-7 St Rynagh's, 9/4/2017,
- Ferbane 4-7, 1-14 Gracefield, 9/4/2017,

Round 2

- Rhode 0-13, 1-9 Cappincur, 22/4/2017,
- Clara 1-11, 0-11 Gracefield, 22/4/2017,
- Tullamore 2-6, 1-9 Ferbane, 23/4/2017,
- Edenderry 2-18, 0-9 St Rynagh's, 23/4/2017,

Round 3

- Edenderry 1-14, 2-10 Gracefield, 7/7/2017,
- Cappincur 1-10, 0-10 St Rynagh's, 7/7/2017,
- Rhode 1-15, 2-9 Ferbane, 8/7/2017,
- Tullamore 3-9, 0-16 Clara, 8/7/2017,

Round 4

- Tullamore 1-8, 1-8 Edenderry, 22/7/2017,
- St Rynagh's 1-11, 0-13 Gracefield, 22/7/2017,
- Ferbane 5-11, 0-13 Cappincur, 23/7/2017,
- Rhode 2-18, 0-15 Clara, 23/7/2017,

Round 5

- Gracefield 4-9, 0-8 Tullamore, 4/8/2017,
- Clara 4-6, 1-9 Cappincur, 6/8/2017,
- Ferbane 3-9, 0-11 St Rynagh's, 6/8/2017,
- Rhode 0-9, 0-6 Edenderry, 9/8/2017,

Round 6

- Tullamore 0-10, 0-7 St Rynagh's, 19/8/2017,
- Ferbane 0-13, 0-7 Clara, 20/8/2017,
- Rhode 1-14, 1-10 Gracefield, 20/8/2017,
- Edenderry 2-16, 2-6 Cappincur, 20/8/2017,

Round 7

- Ferbane 2-15, 1-13 Edenderry, 1/9/2017,
- Clara 2-15, 0-5 St Rynagh's, 1/9/2017,
- Rhode 2-12, 1-12 Tullamore, 1/9/2017,
- Gracefield 0-10, 0-9 Cappincur, 1/9/2017,

== Knock-out Stage ==
=== Last Four ===
The top four finishers in the league qualified for the quarter-finals.

Semi-Finals
Gracefield	2-8
Tullamore	0-8
Clara	1-11
Edenderry	0-9

Final
Rhode	1-15
Gracefield	1-7
Clara	1-13
Ferbane	1-12

Final
Rhode	0-12
Clara	0-9

=== Quarter-finals ===
16 September 2017; 16:15; Semi-Final	Clara	1-11 – 0-9	Edenderry	O'Connor Park, Offaly; Referee: Alan McKnight

16 September 2017; 17:45; Semi-Final	Gracefield	2-8 – 0-8	Tullamore	O'Connor Park, Offaly; Referee: Gerard Keyes

=== Semi-finals ===
24 September 2017; 2:30 pm Semi-Final	Clara	1-13 – 1-12	Ferbane	O'Connor Park; Attendance: 2,419; Referee: Fergal Smyth (Kilclonfert)
24 September 2017; 2:30 pm Semi-Final	Thomas Deehan 0-5 (0-4f), John O'Hara and Graham Guilfoyle 0-3 each, Scott Brady 1-0, Matthew Mitchell and Pa Smith (0-1f) 0-1 each	Report	Ryan Heavin 0-4 (0-3f), Aidan Kennaghan 1-0, Joseph Maher and Colin Kenny 0-2 each, Oisin Kelly, David Cox, Leon Fox, Cian Johnson 0-1 each	O'Connor Park; Attendance: 2,419; Referee: Fergal Smyth (Kilclonfert)

24 September 2017; 4:00 pm Semi-Final	Rhode	1-15 – 1-7	Gracefield	O'Connor Park; Attendance: 2,419; Referee: Fintan Pierce (Raheen)
24 September 2017; 4:00 pm Semi-Final	Niall McNamee 0-7 (0-4f, 1 '45), Anton Sullivan 1-2, James McPadden 0-2, Darren Garry, Niall Darby, Pauric Sullivan, Shane Lowry 0-1 each	Report	Stephen Flanagan 0-5 (0-4f), Stephen Slattery 1-0, Keith Mullally and Padraig Duffy 0-1 each	O'Connor Park; Attendance: 2,419; Referee: Fintan Pierce (Raheen)

=== Final ===
15 October 2017; 3:30 pm Final	Rhode	0-12 – 0-9	Clara	O'Connor Park; Attendance: 5,272; Referee: Ger Keyes (Shamrocks); Man of the Match: Niall McNamee
15 October 2017; 3:30 pm Final	Niall McNamee 0-8 (0-5f, 1 '45), Ruairi McNamee 0-2, Paul McPadden and Stephen Hannon 0-1 each	Report	Thomas Deehan 0-3 (0-2f), John O'Hara and Pa Smith 0-2 each, Robert Mitchell and Graham Guilfoyle 0-1 each	O'Connor Park; Attendance: 5,272; Referee: Ger Keyes (Shamrocks); Man of the Match: Niall McNamee

== Relegation play-off ==
The two bottom-placed teams from each group play off in the relegation final with the loser relegated to the 2018 Senior B Championship.

- Cappincur 0-16, 2-7 St Rynagh's, Pullough, 15/9/2017,
