= 2018 Offaly Senior Football Championship =

Offaly S.F.C.
- Season: 2018
- Champions: Rhode (29th SFC Title)
- Relegated: Durrow
- All Ireland SCFC: n/a
- Winning Captain: ???
- Man of the Match: ???
- Winning Manager: ???
- Leinster SCFC: ???
- Matches: 56

The 2018 Offaly Senior Football Championship was the 121st edition of Offaly GAA's premier Gaelic football competition for senior graded clubs in County Offaly, Ireland. Eight teams compete, with the winner representing Offaly in the Leinster Senior Club Football Championship.

The championship starts a league stage and progresses to a knockout stage.

Rhode were the defending champions after they defeated Clara in the previous years final, and they successfully defended their title to claim a "3-in-a-row" when defeating Ferbane in the final.

This was Durrow's return to the senior grade after claiming the 2017 Offaly Senior B Football Championship title, however they were relegated back to Senior B for 2019 when suffering relegation at the hands of Durrow.

== Team changes ==
The following teams have changed division since the 2017 championship season.

=== To S.F.C. ===
Promoted from 2017 Offaly Senior B Football Championship

- Durrow - (Intermediate Champions)

=== From S.F.C. ===
Relegated to 2018 Offaly Senior B Football Championship

- St Rynagh's

== League Phase ==
The top two in the group went directly to the semi-final. The third through sixth place teams contested the quarter-finals. The two bottom finishers qualified for the Relegation Final.

| Team | Pld | W | L | D | PF | PA | PD | Pts |
|---|---|---|---|---|---|---|---|---|
| Rhode | 7 | 6 | 0 | 1 | 0 | 0 | +0 | 13 |
| Ferbane | 7 | 4 | 1 | 2 | 0 | 0 | +0 | 10 |
| Clara | 7 | 4 | 2 | 1 | 0 | 0 | +0 | 9 |
| Edenderry | 7 | 4 | 2 | 1 | 0 | 0 | +0 | 9 |
| Tullamore | 7 | 4 | 3 | 0 | 0 | 0 | +0 | 8 |
| Gracefield | 7 | 2 | 5 | 0 | 0 | 0 | +0 | 4 |
| Cappincur | 7 | 1 | 5 | 1 | 0 | 0 | +0 | 3 |
| Durrow | 7 | 0 | 7 | 0 | 0 | 0 | +0 | 0 |

Round 1

- Clara 4-17, 0-11 Gracefield, 7/4/2018,
- Edenderry 1-12, 1-10 Tullamore, 7/4/2018,
- Ferbane 6-13, 0-8 Durrow, 8/4/2018,
- Rhode 3-15, 0-17 Cappincur, 8/4/2018,

Round 2

- Rhode 2-15, 0-9 Clara, 18/4/2018,
- Edenderry 3-12, 1-11 Cappincur, 18/4/2018,
- Tullamore 0-18, 1-7 Durrow, 19/4/2018,
- Ferbane 4-24, 0-10 Gracefield, 19/4/2018,

Round 3

- Edenderry 2-16, 3-11 Gracefield, 7/7/2018,
- Clara 1-9, 1-7 Cappincur, 7/7/2018,
- Tullamore 0-13, 0-11 Ferbane, 8/7/2018,
- Rhode 4-18, 0-3 Durrow, 8/7/2018,

Round 4

- Edenderry 0-15, 1-5 Durrow, 18/7/2018,
- Gracefield 2-14, 1-14 Cappincur, 21/7/2018,
- Clara 2-14, 1-12 Tullamore, 21/7/2018,
- Rhode 2-8, 0-14 Ferbane, 22/7/2018,

Round 5

- Ferbane 1-12, 0-14 Clara, 3/8/2018,
- Tullamore 0-19, 1-11 Gracefield, 3/8/2018,
- Cappincur 3-12, 2-9 Durrow, 3/8/2018,
- Rhode 1-16, 0-13 Edenderry, 4/8/2018,

Round 6

- Gracefield 4-10, 2-12 Durrow, 18/8/2018,
- Cappincur 0-18, 1-15 Ferbane, 18/8/2018,
- Rhode 1-8, 0-8 Tullamore, 18/8/2018,
- Edenderry 1-11, 0-14 Clara, 18/8/2018,

Round 7

- Clara 0-14, 2-6 Durrow, 31/8/2018,
- Tullamore 3-14, 1-14 Cappincur, 31/8/2018,
- Rhode 1-12, 2-8 Gracefield, 31/8/2018,
- Ferbane 3-10, 1-10 Edenderry, 31/8/2018,

== Knock-out Stage ==
=== Quarter-finals ===
| 16 September 2018; Quarter-Final | Clara | 0-11 - 1-5 | Gracefield | O'Connor Park; Referee: ??? Man of the Match: ??? |

| 16 September 2018; Quarter-Final | Tullamore | 3-10 - 1-10 | Edenderry | O'Connor Park; Referee: ??? Man of the Match: ??? |

=== Semi-finals ===
| 30 September 2018; Semi-Final | Rhode | 2-9 - 1-10 | Tullamore | O'Connor Park; Referee: ??? Man of the Match: ??? |

| 30 September 2018; Semi-Final | Ferbane | 3-10 - 1-10 | Clara | O'Connor Park; Referee: ??? Man of the Match: ??? |

=== Final ===
| 14 October 2018; Final | Rhode | 1-18 - 0-10 | Ferbane | O'Connor Park; Referee: ??? Man of the Match: ??? |

== Relegation play-off ==
The two bottom placed teams from each group play off in the relegation final with the loser relegated to the 2019 Senior B Championship.

- Cappincur 2-13, 0-8 Durrow, O'Connor Park, 15/9/2018,
