= Dónal O'Neill =

Irish Gaelic footballer (1967–2023)

Personal information
- Born: 1967 Edenderry, County Offaly, Ireland
- Died: 10 October 2023 (aged 56) Dublin, Ireland
- Occupation: University lecturer

Sport
- Sport: Gaelic football
- Position: Goalkeeper
Club
- Years: Club
- 1984–1988; 1995: Edenderry
Club titles
- Offaly titles: 2
Inter-county
Years	County	Apps (scores)
1985–1988	Offaly	7 (0–0)
Inter-county titles
- Leinster titles: 0
- All-Irelands: 0
- NFL: 0
- All Stars: 0

Dónal O'Neill (1967 – 10 October 2023) was an Irish Gaelic footballer. At club level he played with Edenderry and at inter-county level with the Offaly senior team. O'Neill usually lined out as a goalkeeper.

== Career ==
O'Neill first appeared at senior level for Edenderry as a 17-year-old in 1984. A year later, he was part of the team that beat Raheen by a point to win the Offaly SFC title. At inter-county level, O'Neill was part of the Offaly minor and under-21 teams in 1985, before making his senior team debut in a 3–16 to 1–8 defeat of Louth in that year's Leinster SFC.

O'Neill captained the Offaly under-21 team to the Leinster U21FC title in 1986. He claimed a second winners' medal in 1988, before adding an All-Ireland U21FC medal to his collection after an 0–11 to 0–9 defeat of Cavan. After taking a complete break from playing to concentrate on his studies, O'Neill returned to club activity and won a second Offaly SFC title in 1995.

== Personal life and death ==
O'Neill obtained his PhD from the University of Iowa in 1993 and later lectured in economics at the University of Maynooth. He died on 10 October 2023, at the age of 56.

== Honours ==
Edenderry

- Offaly Senior Football Championship: 1985, 1995

Offaly

- All-Ireland Under-21 Football Championship: 1988
- Leinster Under-21 Football Championship: 1986, 1988
