= 2016 Offaly Senior Football Championship =

Offaly S.F.C.
- Season: 2016
- Champions: Rhode (27th S.F.C. Title)
- Relegated: Ballycumber
- Leinster SCFC: ???
- All Ireland SCFC: n/a
- Winning Captain: ???
- Man of the Match: ???
- Matches: 56

The 2016 Offaly Senior Football Championship was the 119th edition of Offaly GAA's premier Gaelic football competition for senior graded clubs in County Offaly, Ireland. Eight teams compete, with the winner representing Offaly in the Leinster Senior Club Football Championship.

The championship starts with two groups of four teams and progresses to a knockout stage.

Edenderry were the defending champions after they defeated Rhode in the previous years final, however they failed to qualify for the knock-out stages this season.

This was Ballycumber's return to the senior grade after claiming the 2015 Offaly Senior B Football Championship title. They made the straight bounce back to the top flight after being relegated in 2014 to the Senior B championship due to the changing format of the championships, where the number of teams in the senior grade was reduced from 12 to 8. However, Ballycumber were relegated back to the Senior B Championship at the end of the season.

On 16 October 2016, Rhode claimed their 27th S.F.C. title when defeating Ferbane 1-14 to 0-9 in the final at O'Connor Park.

== Team changes ==
The following teams have changed division since the 2015 championship season.

=== To S.F.C. ===
Promoted from 2015 Offaly Senior B Football Championship

- Ballycumber – (Intermediate Champions)

=== From S.F.C. ===
Relegated to 2016 Offaly Senior B Football Championship

- St Brigid's

== Group stage ==
There are 2 groups called Group A and B. The top two finishers in each group qualified for the semi-finals. The bottom finishers of each group qualified for the Relegation Final.

=== Group A ===
Team	Pld	W	L	D	PF	PA	PD	Pts
Rhode	3	3	0	0	78	44	+34	6
Tullamore	3	1	1	1	43	46	-3	3
Edenderry	3	1	1	1	43	52	-9	3
Clara	3	0	3	0	41	63	-22	0

Round 1

- Rhode 0-20, 1-11 Tullamore, 23/7/2016,
- Edenderry 1-12, 0-13 Clara, 23/7/2016,

Round 2

- Rhode 2-18, 2-7 Edenderry, 6/8/2016,
- Tullamore 1-11, 0-11 Clara, 6/8/2016,

Round 3

- Edenderry 0-15, 2-9 Tullamore, 26/8/2016,
- Rhode 6-16, 0-17 Clara, 27/8/2016,

=== Group B ===
Team	Pld	W	L	D	PF	PA	PD	Pts
Ferbane	3	3	0	0	57	28	+29	6
Gracefield	3	2	1	0	48	48	+0	4
St Rynagh's	3	1	2	0	38	44	-6	2
Ballycumber	3	0	3	0	32	55	-23	0

Round 1

- Gracefield 2-12, 1-9 St Rynagh's, 24/7/2016,
- Ferbane 1-16, 0-8 Ballycumber, 24/7/2016,

Round 2

- Ferbane 3-10, 1-4 Gracefield, 7/8/2016,
- St Rynagh's 2-7, 0-7 Ballycumber, 7/8/2016,

Round 3

- Gracefield 2-17, 2-11 Ballycumber, 28/8/2016,
- Ferbane 3-10, 1-10 St Rynagh's, 28/8/2016,

== Knock-out Stage ==
=== Last Four ===
The winners and runners up of each group qualified for the quarter-finals.

Semi-Finals		Final
Rhode	1-11
Gracefield	1-7	Rhode	1-14
Ferbane	3-10	Ferbane	0-9
Tullamore	1-10

=== Semi-finals ===
25 September 2016
14:00
Semi-Final

Rhode	1-11 – 1-7	Gracefield
Stephen Hannon 1-1 (0-1f), Niall McNamee 0-4 (0-1f), Ruairi McNamme 0-2, Pauric Sullivan, Paul McPadden, Anton Sullivan, Conor McNamee 0-1 each	Report	Stephen Flanagan 1-6 (0-5f, 0-1 45’), Jack Walsh 0-1

O'Connor Park, Offaly
Referee: Chris Dwyer
25 September 2016
16:00
Semi-Final

Ferbane	3-10 – 1-10	Tullamore
Shane Nally 1-2 (0-1f), David Cox 1-2, Jack Clancy 1-2, Oisín Kelly and Joseph Maher (0-1f) 0-2 each	Report	Shane Dooley 0-5 (0-1f, 0-1 45’), Adam Shelly 1-1, Michael Brazil and John Kavanagh 0-2 each

O'Connor Park, Offaly
Referee: Fergal Smyth

=== Final ===
16 October 2016
15:00
Final

Rhode	1-14 – 0-9	Ferbane
Niall McNamee 0-6, Paul McPadden 1-1, Anton Sullivan 0-3, Stephen Hannon, Ruairi McNamee, Niall Darby, Conor McNamee 0-1 each	Report	Shane Nally 0-6f, Joseph Maher, Kevin Nugent, Aaron McDonagh 0-1 each

O'Connor Park, Offaly
Attendance: 5,519
Referee: Fergal Smyth (Kilclonfert)

== Relegation Play Off ==
The bottom team from each group play off in the relegation final with the loser relegated to the 2017 Senior B Championship.

- Clara 3-13, 0-5 Ballycumber, Tubber, 9/9/2016
