= Brendan Reilly =

Brendan Reilly may refer to:

- Brendan Reilly (athlete), British high jumper
- Brendan Reilly (politician), vice mayor of Chicago
- Brendan Reilly (Meath Gaelic footballer), Irish Gaelic footballer
- Brendan Reilly (Louth Gaelic footballer), Irish Gaelic footballer
- Brendan Reilly (doctor)
