= 1996–97 All-Ireland Senior Club Football Championship =

Gaelic football championship

- Dates: 6 October 1996 – 17 March 1997
- Teams: 33
- Sponsor: Allied Irish Bank
- Champions: Crossmaglen Rangers (1st title); Jim McConville (captain); Joe Kernan (manager)
- Runners-up: Knockmore; Hughie Langan (captain); Éamonn Clarke (manager)

Tournament statistics
- Matches played: 36
- Top scorer(s): Oisín McConville (2-30)

The 1996–97 All-Ireland Senior Club Football Championship was the 27th staging of the All-Ireland Senior Club Football Championship since its establishment by the Gaelic Athletic Association in 1970-71. The championship began on 6 October 1996 and ended on 17 March 1997.

Laune Rangers entered the championship as the defending champions, however, they were beaten by Crossmaglen Rangers in the All-Ireland semi-final.

On 17 March 1997, Crossmaglen Rangers won the championship following a 2-13 to 0-11 defeat of Knockmore in the All-Ireland final at Croke Park. It was their first ever championship title.

Crossmaglen Rangers's Oisín McConville was the championship's top scorer with 2-30.

== Connacht ==
=== Quarter-final ===
20 October 1996 Quarter-final	Knockmore	2-14 - 1-04	Allen Gaels	James Stephens Park
	P Brogan 1-5, K Staunton 0-4, S Smyth 1-0, S Sweeney 0-2, K O'Neill 0-2, J Davis 0-1.		D Lynch 1-1, A Fee 0-1, A Cullen 0-1, N Moran 0-1.

=== Semi-finals ===
20 October 1996 Semi-final	An Cheathrú Rua	0-10 - 0-12	Clann na nGael	Tuam Stadium
	G Mac Donncha 0-6, P Ó Sé 0-2, S Ó Domhnaill 0-1, C Ó hIarnáin 0-1.		R Durney 0-8, A Carbury 0-1, D Kelly 0-1, E Gavin 0-1, J Connaghton 0-1.

3 November 1996 Semi-final	Knockmore	0-14 - 0-06	St Mary's	James Stephens Park
	P Brogan 0-5, K O'Neill 0-3, P Butler 0-2, S Smyth 0-1, P Cawley 0-1, D Sweeney 0-1, G O'Hara 0-1.		E McCloskey 0-2, P Newton 0-1, J Clifford 0-1, Maurice Galvin 0-1, K Breheny 0-1.

=== Final ===
23 November 1996 Final	Knockmore	1-05 - 0-06	Clann na nGael	James Stephens Park
	S Sweeney 1-0, P Brogan 0-3, S Smyth 0-1, H Langan 0-1.		E Durney 0-3, E McManus 0-1, P McManus 0-1.

== Leinster ==
=== First round ===
20 October 1996 First round	James Stephens	0-03 - 1-11	Killanerin	Nowlan Park
	L O'Connor 0-2, B McEvoy 0-1.		J Hegarty 1-4, P Hughes 0-2, N Darcy 0-2, M Darcy 0-1, D Noonan 0-1, M Murphy 0-1.

20 October 1996 First round	Fr Manning Gaels	1-06 - 2-08	Round Towers	Pearse Park
	G Whelan 1-0, P Davis 0-3, C Hanniffy 0-2, J Breslin 0-1.		S Daly 0-4, E Cleary 1-0, L Ryan 1-0, Derek Maher 0-2, G Ryan 0-1, J Burke 0-1.

20 October 1996 First round	Rathnew	0-10 - 0-10	Shannonbridge	Aughrim County Ground
			F McEvoy 0-6, D McEvoy 0-1, J Ryan 0-1, PJ Kelly 0-1, A Kelly 0-1.

20 October 1996 First round	Coralstown/Kinnegad	0-10 - 1-10	Éire Óg	Cusack Park
	L Giles 0-6, J Cooney 0-1, D Flynn 0-1, J Fleming 0-1, T Wiley 0-1.		C Hayden 1-2, A Keating 0-3, P McCarthy 0-2, J Murphy 0-1, G Ware 0-1, J Morrissey 0-1.

26 October 1996 First round replay	Shannonbridge	1-09 - 0-11	Rathnew	O'Connor Park
	A Kelly 1-1, F McEvoy 0-4, PJ Kelly 0-2, D Claffey 0-1, V Mooney 0-1.		D Coffey 0-5, B Murphy 0-3, M Doyle 0-2, T Doyle 0-1.

=== Quarter-finals ===
3 November 1996 Quarter-final	Killanerin	2-09 - 0-05	St Joseph's (Louth)	Páirc Uí Shíocháin
	J Hegarty 2-2, M Forde 0-6, P Forde 0-1.		N Giblin 0-2, D O'Reilly 0-2, P O'Connor 0-1.

3 November 1996 Quarter-final	Round Towers	0-16 - 1-12	St Joseph's (Laois)	St Conleth's Park
	S Daly 0-6, L Donlon 0-2, J Burke 0-2, J Drea 0-2, L Ryan 0-2, E Cleary 0-1, P McConnon 0-1.		M O'Brien 0-6, Michael Dempsey 1-0, S Kelly 0-3, D Cooney 0-2, Martin Dempsey 0-1.

3 November 1996 Quarter-final	Shannonbridge	0-04 - 0-11	St Sylvester's	O'Connor Park
	J Ryan 0-2, F McEvoy 0-1, PJ Kelly 0-1.		S Keogh 0-5, G Dolan 0-2, N Guiden 0-1, K Galvin 0-1, C Barnes 0-1, D Roche 0-1.

3 November 1996 Quarter-final	Éire Óg	2-14 - 1-10	Dunderry	Dr Cullen Park
	W Quinlan 1-2, C Hayden 1-1, A Keating 0-3, P McCarthy 0-2, J Hayden 0-2, A Callinan 0-1, B Hayden 0-1, J Morrissey 0-1, G Ware 0-1.		J Brady 1-4, T Dowd 0-2, J Conaty 0-2, S Kelly 0-1, B Callinan 0-1.

=== Semi-finals ===
18 November 1996 Semi-final	St Sylvester's	2-10 - 0-08	Killanerin	O'Moore Park
	C Earley 1-1, S Keogh 0-4, G Dolan 0-4, D Barnes 1-0, E Stuart 0-1.		M Forde 0-7, D Noonan 0-1.

18 November 1996 Semi-final	Éire Óg	4-08 - 0-07	Round Towers	O'Moore Park
	A Keating 1-4, C Hayden 1-1, J Morrissey 1-1, J Murphy 1-0, H Brennan 0-2.		S Daly 0-2, J Burke 0-1, L Donlon 0-1, G Ryan 0-1, I Moore 0-1, D Maher 0-1.

=== Final ===
1 December 1996 Final	Éire Óg	1-10 - 0-08	St Sylvester's	St Conleth's Park
	G Ware 1-1, J Hayden 0-3, C Hayden 0-3, A Keating 0-2, K Haughey 0-1.		S Keogh 0-4, T Cummins 0-3, D Roche 0-1.

== Munster ==
=== First round ===
3 November 1996 First round	Rathgormack	1-09 - 1-08	Moyle Rovers	Fraher Field
	M Power 0-5, G Power 1-0, J Murray 0-3, P Crotty 0-1.		D Browne 1-5, Donal Foley 0-1, Derry Foley 0-1, J McGrath 0-1.

3 November 1996 First round	Claughaun	1-09 - 4-12	Clonakilty	Páirc na nGael
	D Fitzgerald 1-2, L O'Connor 0-3, P Galligan 0-2, M Galligan 0-2.		P Griffin 3-1, T Dillon 1-3, B O'Donovan 0-3, B Walsh 0-2, B Murphy 0-1, B Crowley 0-1, K Meade 0-1.

=== Semi-finals ===
17 November 1996 Semi-final	Clonakilty	1-11 - 1-06	Doonbeg	Clonakilty Sportsfield
	E O'Mahony 0-6, T Dillon 1-2, K Meade 0-2, B O'Donovan 0-1.		P Conway 1-0, B Shanahan 0-2, F McInerney 0-2, G Killeen 0-1, L Hayes 0-1, S Lynch 0-1.

17 November 1996 Semi-final	Rathgormack	1-05 - 1-05	Laune Rangers	Fraher Field
	F Halpin 1-0, G Power 0-2, P Crotty 0-1, J Murray 0-1, D Crotty 0-1.		P O'Sullivan 1-1, P Griffin 0-3, C Kearney 0-1.

24 November 1996 Semi-final replay	Laune Rangers	0-08 - 0-04	Rathgormack	FitzGerald Stadium
	MF Russell 0-2, G Murphy 0-2, P Griffin 0-1, J Sheehan 0-1, P Murphy 0-1, M O'Connor 0-1.		J Murray 0-2, M Power 0-1, R Power 0-1.

=== Final ===
1 December 1996 Final	Laune Rangers	0-13 - 0-10	Clonakilty	FitzGerald Stadium
	G Murphy 0-5, MF Russell 0-2, P Griffin 0-2, B O'Shea 0-2, P O'Sullivan 0-1, L Hassett 0-1.		T Dillon 0-3, O O'Mahony 0-3, T Mannix 0-1, B Walsh 0-1, K Meade 0-1, B O'Donovan 0-1.

== Ulster ==
=== Preliminary round ===
6 October 1996 Quarter-final	Burren	1-09 - 1-09	Gowna	Páirc Esler
	J McAlinden 1-2, J Treanor 0-5, A Woods 0-1, T McArdle 0-1.		Dermot McCabe 0-5, Declan McCabe 1-0, S Pierson 0-2, F Hartin 0-1, B Morris 0-1.

20 October 1996 Preliminary round replay	Gowna	0-07 - 1-10	Burren	Hugh O'Reilly Park
	S Pierson 0-4, C Madden 0-1, Declan McCabe 0-1, Dermot McCabe 0-1.		J Treanor 0-5, A Walsh 1-1, G Murdock 0-1, R Mussen 0-1, J McAlinden 0-1, A McGivern 0-1.

=== Quarter-finals ===
6 October 1996 Quarter-final	Killybegs	0-10 - 1-11	St Paul's	Ballyshannon
	M Boyle 0-7, C Gallagher 0-1, P Callaghan 0-1, JB Gallagher 0-1.		J McManus 1-1, H Tohill 0-3, A Donnelly 0-2, B O'Neill 0-1, J Kennedy 0-1, P McStravick 0-1, P McErlean 0-1, D Finnegan 0-1.

6 October 1996 Quarter-final	Carrickmore St Colmcille's	0-07 - 0-08	Castleblayney Faughs	Healy Park
	P Loughran 0-3, D Loughran 0-1, B Gormley 0-1, S McCallan 0-1, S Loughran 0-1.		P McDonald 0-6, A McArdle 0-1, P Duffy 0-1.

6 October 1996 Quarter-final	Devenish	0-08 - 0-11	Bellaghy	Brewster Park
	P Coyle 0-3, S Burns 0-2, G O'Brien 0-1, M O'Brien 0-1, M Gallagher 0-1.		J Cassidy 0-3, K Diamond 0-2, B Lee 0-2, J Mullholland 0-2, Quinn 0-1, J Donnelly 0-1.

3 November 1996 Quarter-final	Crossmaglen Rangers	0-12 - 1-08	Burren	Oliver Plunkett Park
	O McConville 0-4, A Cunningham 0-3, J McConville 0-2, J McEntee 0-2, G Cumiskey 0-1.		J Treanor 0-7, J McAlinden 1-0, A McGivern 0-1.

=== Semi-finals ===
20 October 1996 Semi-final	Bellaghy	2-09 - 0-11	St Paul's	Athletic Grounds
	J Cassidy 1-4, D Cassidy 1-1, B Lee 0-2, J Mulholland 0-1, P Scullion 0-1.		J Kennedy 0-4, J McManus 0-4, J Quinn 0-2, D Finnegan 0-1.

17 November 1996 Semi-final	Crossmaglen Rangers	1-19 - 0-10	Castleblayney Faughs	St Tiernach's Park
	O McConville 0-10, J McConville 1-2, A Cunningham 0-2, J Fitzpatrick 0-2, G McEntee 0-1, C O'Neill 0-1, G Comiskey 0-1.		P McDonnell 0-3, A Tavey 0-3, M O'Connor 0-2, R McArdle 0-1, P Campbell 0-1.

=== Final ===
1 December 1996 Final	Bellaghy	1-07 - 1-07	Crossmaglen Rangers	St Tiernach's Park
	J Cassidy 0-5, E Cassidy 1-1, G Doherty 0-1.		J McConville 1-0, O McConville 0-2, J McEntee 0-2, T McEntee 0-2, C Short 0-1.

8 December 1996 Final replay	Crossmaglen Rangers	2-05 - 0-08	Bellaghy	St Tiernach's Park
	O McConville 1-4, C Short 1-1.		J Cassidy 0-4, D Cassidy 0-2, P Diamond 0-1, P Downey 0-1.

== Quarter-final ==
8 December 1996 Quarter-final	Tír Chonaill Gaels	2-06 - 1-11	Knockkmore	Emerald GAA Grounds
	T Maguire 1-2, P Coleman 0-4, P Tinelly 1-0.		Declan Sweeeny 1-3, K Staunton 0-3, K O'Neill 0-2, J Davis 0-1, D Dempsey 0-1, P Brogan 0-1.

== Semi-finals ==
23 February 1997 Semi-final	Knockmore	3-14 - 0-05	Éire Óg	Cusack Park
	K O'Neill 1-7, R Dempsey 2-0, D Sweeney 0-3, P Brogan 0-2, J Davis 0-1, S Sweeney 0-1.		A Keating 0-3, J Hayden 0-2.

23 February 1997 Semi-final	Crossmaglen Rangers	1-08 - 1-07	Laune Rangers	O'Moore Park
	J McConville 1-1, O McConville 0-3, T McEntee 0-2, C O'Neill 0-1, C Short 0-1.		MF Russell 1-2, T Fleming 0-2, P Griffin 0-1, L Hassett 0-1, G Murphy 0-1.

== Final ==
17 March 1997 Final	Crossmaglen Rangers	2-13 - 0-11	Knockmore	Croke Park
	O McConville 1-7, J McConville 1-1, A Cunningham 0-2, G McShane 0-1, J McEntee 0-1, M Moley 0-1.		K O'Neill 0-6, P Brogan 0-3, D Sweeney 0-1, S Sweeney 0-1.

== Statistics ==
=== Top scorers ===
Overall

Rank	Player	Club	Tally	Total	Matches	Average
1	Oisín McConville	Crossmaglen Rangers	2-30	36	6	6.00
2	Kevin O'Neill	Knockmore	1-20	23	6	3.83
3	Pádraig Brogan	Knockmore	1-19	22	6	3.66
4	Joe Cassidy	Bellaghy	1-16	19	4	4.75
5	Jim McConville	Crossmaglen Rangers	4-06	18	6	3.00
5	Anthony Keating	Éire Óg	1-15	18	5	3.60
6	John Treanor	Burren	0-17	17	3	5.66
7	Colm Hayden	Éire Óg	3-07	16	5	3.20
8	John Hegarty	Kilanerin	3-06	15	3	5.00
9	Terry Dillon	Clonakilty	2-08	14	3	4.66

In a single game

Rank	Player	Club	Tally	Total	Opposition
1	Pádraig Griffin	Clonakilty	3-01	10	Claughaun
1	Kevin O'Neill	Knockmore	1-07	10	Éire Óg
1	Oisín McConville	Crossmaglen Rangers	1-07	10	Knockmore
1	Oisín McConville	Crossmaglen Rangers	0-10	10	Castleblayney Faughs
2	John Hegarty	Kilanerin	2-02	8	St Joseph's (Louth)
2	Declan Browne	Moyle Rovers	1-05	8	Rathgormack
2	Pádraig Brogan	Knockmore	1-05	8	Allen Gaels
2	Emmett Durney	Clann na nGael	0-08	8	An Cheathrú Rua
3	John Hegarty	Kilanerin–Ballyfad	1-04	7	James Stephens
3	John Brady	Dunderry	1-04	7	Éire Óg
3	Anthony Keating	Éire Óg	1-04	7	Round Towers
3	Joe Cassidy	Bellaghy	1-04	7	St Paul's
3	Oisín McConville	Crossmaglen Rangers	1-04	7	Bellaghy
3	Mattie Forde	Kilanerin	0-07	7	St Sylvester's
3	Manus Boyle	Killybegs	0-07	7	St Paul's
3	John Treanor	Burren	0-07	7	Crossmaglen Rangers
