= 2019 Offaly Senior Football Championship =

Offaly S.F.C.
- Season: 2019
- Champions: Ferbane (12th SFC Title)
- Relegated: Gracefield
- All Ireland SCFC: n/a
- Winning Captain: ???
- Man of the Match: ???
- Winning Manager: ???
- Leinster SCFC: ???
- Matches: 56

The 2019 Offaly Senior Football Championship was the 122nd edition of Offaly GAA's premier Gaelic football competition for senior graded clubs in County Offaly, Ireland. Eight teams compete, with the winner representing Offaly in the Leinster Senior Club Football Championship.

The championship starts a league stage and progresses to a knockout stage.

Rhode were the defending champions after they defeated Ferbane in the previous year's final, however Ferbane claimed revenge this year when defeating Rhode in the final to claim their first championship in 25 years their 12th title overall.

This was Shamrocks' return to the senior grade after claiming the 2018 Offaly Senior B Football Championship title.

Gracefield were relegated to the I.F.C. for 2020 when losing their Relegation Final to Tullamore.

== Format Changes ==
2019 sees the adoption of a new criss-cross championship format. In 2018, the eight senior teams were in one group, but the 2019 season sees two groups made up of four teams. The format comprises two partially seeded groups of four at Senior A level with one county finalist, one beaten semi-finalist, one beaten quarter-finalist and one of the relegation play-off winners or promoted teams in each of the groups. Group 1 teams will play the teams in Group 2 thus ensuring that each team plays four games. The first two rounds are to be played on a home and away basis. The third round will then be played at O'Connor Park, while the fourth round will be played on the same day at neutral venues around the county.

At the end of this phase, the top teams in each group contest opposite semi-finals while their opponents are decided by two quarter-finals. Those quarter-finals will be contested by the runners-up and third-placed teams in each group with the runners-up in Group A playing the third-placed team in Group A. Repeat fixtures are ruled out by virtue of the criss-cross system which will ensure those two teams did not meet in the round-robin phase. The second quarter-final will be formed in the same way from Group B. The bottom teams in each group will enter a Relegation Final.

The group winners already in a semi-final will also play the winning quarter-finalists from their own groups, also ensuring no repeat fixtures at that stage. The Offaly CCC's hope is that they can make the championship more competitive than it has been

== Team changes ==
The following teams have changed division since the 2018 championship season.

=== To S.F.C. ===
Promoted from 2018 Senior B Football Championship

- Shamrocks - (Senior B Champions)

=== From S.F.C. ===
Relegated to 2019 Senior B Football Championship

- Durrow

== Group stage ==
The following seeded teams were applied to the draw for Groups A and B based on their performance during the 2018 season. One team from each category was drawn into each group -

Finalists:

- Rhode
- Ferbane

Beaten Semi-Finalists:

- Clara
- Tullamore

Beaten Quarter-Finalists:

- Edenderry
- Gracefield

Relegation Final Winner & I.F.C. Champions:

- Cappincur
- Shamrocks

=== Group A ===
Team	Pld	W	L	D	PF	PA	PD	Pts
Edenderry	4	4	0	0	99	44	+55	8
Ferbane	4	3	1	0	66	42	+24	6
Shamrocks	4	3	2	0	72	62	+10	6
Tullamore	4	2	2	0	67	46	+21	4

=== Group B ===
Team	Pld	W	L	D	PF	PA	PD	Pts
Rhode	4	2	2	0	57	41	+16	4
Clara	4	2	2	0	57	66	-9	4
Cappincur	4	0	4	0	40	84	-44	0
Gracefield	4	0	4	0	40	103	-63	0

=== Round 1 ===
- Rhode 0-11, 0-13 Edenderry, 20/7/2019,
- Clara 1-13, 0-11 Ferbane, 20/7/2019,
- Gracefield 1-14, 2-14 Shamrocks, 21/7/2019,
- Cappincur 0-7, 2-11 Tullamore, 21/7/2019,

=== Round 2 ===
- Edenderry 2-22, 1-13 Clara, 2/8/2019,
- Tullamore 3-18, 0-10 Gracefield, 3/8/2019,
- Shamrocks 2-8, 4-12 Rhode, 4/8/2019,
- Ferbane 1-16, 2-6 Cappincur, 5/8/2019,

=== Round 3 ===
- Edenderry 4-14, 0-10 Cappincur, O'Connor Park, 16/8/2019,
- Shamrocks 2-10, 1-7 Clara, O'Connor Park, 17/8/2019,
- Rhode 1-11, 2-6 Tullamore, O'Connor Park, 17/8/2019,
- Ferbane 3-15, 0-6 Gracefield, O'Connor Park, 18/8/2019,

=== Round 4 ===
- Shamrocks 4-10, 0-11 Cappincur, Killeigh, 31/8/2019,
- Clara 1-12, 0-11 Tullamore, Tubber, 31/8/2019,
- Ferbane 1-9, 0-8 Rhode, O'Connor Park, 31/8/2019,
- Edenderry 4-20, 1-4 Gracefield, Geashill, 31/8/2019,

== Knock-out stage ==
=== Quarter-finals ===
15 September 2019; Quarter-Final	Clara	4-17 - 0-9	Cappincur	O'Connor Park; Referee: ??? Man of the Match: ???

15 September 2019; Quarter-Final	Ferbane	1-12 - 0-9	Shamrocks	O'Connor Park; Referee: ??? Man of the Match: ???

=== Semi-finals ===
29 September 2019; Semi-Final	Rhode	2-9 - 0-9	Clara	O'Connor Park; Referee: ??? Man of the Match: ???

28 September 2019; Semi-Final	Ferbane	1-15 - 1-9	Edenderry	O'Connor Park; Referee: ??? Man of the Match: ???

=== Final ===
13 October 2019; Final	Ferbane	2-13 - 0-14	Rhode	O'Connor Park; Referee: ??? Man of the Match: ???

== Relegation play-off ==
The two bottom placed teams from each group play off in the relegation final with the loser relegated to the 2019 Senior B Championship.

- Tullamore 2-16, 2-9 Gracefield, 15/9/2019,
