= Leon Fox =

Louth hurler

Personal information
- Native name: Leon Ó Sionnaigh (Irish)
- Born: 1993 (age 32–33) Ferbane, County Offaly, Ireland
- Occupation: Garda Síochána

Sport
- Sport: Hurling
- Position: Midfield
Clubs
- Years: Club
- Ferbane (SF); Belmont (SH)
Club titles
	Football	Hurling
Offaly titles	1	0
College
- Years: College
- Garda College
Inter-county
- Years: County
- 2016–2017 2020–: Offaly (SF); Offaly (SH)
Inter-county titles
- Leinster titles: 0
- All-Irelands: 0
- NHL: 0
- All Stars: 0

Leon Fox (born 1993) is an Irish hurler and Gaelic footballer. At club level he plays for Ferbane/Belmont and at inter-county level with the Offaly senior hurling team.

== Career ==
Fox played hurling and Gaelic football during his time at secondary school at Gallen Community School in Ferbane. He was at midfield when the school beat Clonakilty Community College by 2–11 to 1–8 to win the All-Ireland Vocational SAFC title in 2011. Fox later played a variety of sports at the Garda College in Templemore, including rugby union.

After progressing through the juvenile and underage ranks with the Ferbane/Belmont club, Fox eventually joined the club's adult sides as a dual player. He won an Offaly SFC medal in 2019 after Ferbane beat Rhode in the final.

Fox first appeared on the inter-county scene for Offaly as a Gaelic footballer with the under-21 team in 2012. He made his senior football team debut in a National Football League defeat of Limerick in 2016. He transferred to the senior hurling team in 2020. Fox secured his first silverware during the 2021 season, when Offaly claimed the National League Division 2A and Christy Ring Cup titles. He won a Joe McDonagh Cup medal as a member of the extended panel after a defeat of Laois in the 2024 final.

== Honours ==
Gallen Community School

- All-Ireland Vocational Schools Senior A Football Championship: 2011

Shinrone

- Offaly Senior Football Championship: 2019

Offaly

- Joe McDonagh Cup: 2024
- Christy Ring Cup: 2021
- National Hurling League Division 2A: 2021
