= John Ryan (Offaly dual player) =

Irish hurler

Personal information
- Native name: Seán Ó Riain (Irish)
- Born: 1976 (age 49–50) Shannonbridge, County Offaly, Ireland
- Occupation: Farmer

Sport
- Football Position: Full-back
- Hurling Position: Full-forward
Clubs
- Years: Club
- Shannonbridge; Belmont; St Rynagh's
Club titles
	Football	Hurling
Offaly titles	1	0
Inter-county
Years	County	Apps (scores)
1995–2000 1995–2002	Offaly (SF); Offaly (SH)	2 (0–0); 17 (1–5)
Inter-county titles
	Football	Hurling
Leinster Titles	0	0
All-Ireland Titles	0	1
League titles	1	0
All-Stars	0	0

John Ryan (born 1976) is an Irish former hurler and Gaelic footballer. At club level he played with Shannonbridge, Belmont and St Rynagh's and was also a dual player at all levels with Offaly.

== Career ==
Ryan began his club career playing Gaelic football with Shannonbridge. He was part of the club's senior team that won the Offaly SFC title after a defeat of Tullamore in 1996. Ryan played his club hurling with Belmont and St Rynagh's.

At inter-county level, Ryan first played for Offaly as a dual player at minor level in 1994. He later progressed to the under-21 grade, but ended his underage career without success in either code. He became a dual player with Offaly's senior teams in 1995 when he made his debut in the respective National League campaigns. Ryan had his first success in 1998 when Offaly's senior football team won the National Football League title. Later that season he claimed an All-Ireland SHC medal after coming on as a substitute for Johnny Dooley in the 1998 All-Ireland SHC final defeat of Kilkenny. Ryan also lined out in the 2000 All-Ireland SHC final defeat by Kilkenny.

== Honours ==
Shannonbridge

- Offaly Senior Football Championship: 1996

Offaly

- All-Ireland Senior Hurling Championship: 1998
- National Football League: 1997–98
