= 1973 Tuborg 400 =

Auto race held at Riverside International Raceway in 1973

Race details
- Race 15 of 28 in the 1973 NASCAR Winston Cup Series
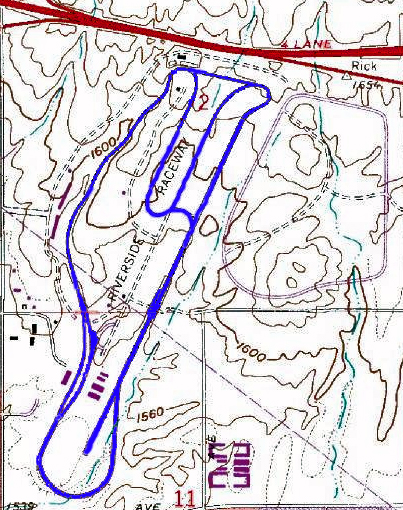
- Layout of Riverside International Raceway (1969-1988 version)
- Date: June 17, 1973
- Official name: Tuborg 400
- Location: Riverside International Raceway, Riverside, California
- Course: Permanent racing facility
- Course length: 2.620 miles (4.216 km)
- Distance: 153 laps, 400.9 mi (645.1 km)
- Weather: Warm with temperatures of 79 °F (26 °C); wind speeds of 11.8 miles per hour (19.0 km/h)
- Average speed: 100.215 mph (161.280 km/h)
- Attendance: 43,700

Pole position
Driver	Richard Petty	Petty Enterprises
- Time: 85.724 seconds

Most laps led
Driver	Bobby Allison	Bobby Allison Motorsports
- Laps: 85

Winner
No. 13	Bobby Allison	Bobby Allison Motorsports

The 1973 Tuborg 400 was a NASCAR Winston Cup Series race that took place on June 17, 1973, at Riverside International Raceway in Riverside, California.

The California 100 for Sportsman Cars was run on the day before this race, the winner was Hershel McGriff followed by Ron Hornaday Sr., Roy Bleckert, Ivan Baldwin, and Jim Sanderson.

== Race report ==
153 laps were completed on the road course spanning 2.620 miles (4.216 km) per lap. The race was completed in exactly four hours with Bobby Allison picking up the second of his six career wins at Riverside against Richard Petty by one minute and thirteen seconds in front of 43,700 spectators. All of the other drivers were lapped by Bobby Allison and Richard Petty. Petty's second-place finish marked the first time that he finished a race at Riverside but did not win.

Dean Dalton was credited with a last-place finish due to an engine problem on lap 7. 19-year-old Chuck Bown received his first top ten.

There were 40 drivers on the grid. Four cautions slowed the race for 22 laps and the average speed was 100.215 miles per hour (161.280 km/h). Petty earned the pole position with a qualifying speed of 110.027 miles per hour (177.071 km/h). Ron Hornaday, Sr. retired from NASCAR after this race. George Behlman made his NASCAR debut in this race. Other notable racers in this event include: Benny Parsons, J.D. McDuffie, Richard Childress, and Buddy Baker.

Winston West driver Jimmy Insolo finished a strong fourth.

Individual race earnings for each driver ranged from $12,750 for the winning driver ($92,470.95 when adjusted for inflation) to $1,125 for the last-place driver ($8,159.2 when adjusted for inflation). A grand total of $75,295 in prize money went to all the drivers. ($546,086.3 when adjusted for inflation).

Notable crew chiefs in this race were Tim Brewer, Richard Elder, Tim Pearson, Travis Carter, Harry Hyde, Dale Inman, and Bud Moore.

=== Qualifying ===
Grid	No.	Driver	Manufacturer	Qualifying time	Speed	Owner
1	43	Richard Petty	'73 Dodge	1:25.724	110.027	Petty Enterprises
2	12	Bobby Allison	'73 Chevrolet	1:25.758	109.983	Bobby Allison
3	71	Buddy Baker	'73 Dodge	1:26.068	109.587	Nord Krauskopf
4	11	Cale Yarborough	'73 Chevrolet	1:26.626	108.881	Richard Howard
5	15	Bobby Isaac	'73 Ford	1:26.874	108.571	Bud Moore
6	04	Hershel McGriff	'72 Plymouth	1:27.000	108.413	Beryl Jackson
7	72	Benny Parsons	'72 Chevrolet	1:27.307	108.302	L.G. DeWitt
8	24	Cecil Gordon	'72 Chevrolet	1:27.760	107.474	Cecil Gordon
9	38	Jimmy Insolo	'72 Chevrolet	1:29.303	105.617	Roger Paquette
10	19	Henley Gray	'71 Mercury	1:30.107	104.675	Henley Gray

Failed to qualify: Steve Vaughn (#73), Doug McGriff (#74), Frank Burnett (#36), Ed Sczech (#61), Marion Collins (#78)

== Finishing order ==
Section reference:

1. Bobby Allison (No. 12)
2. Richard Petty (No. 43)
3. Benny Parsons† (No. 72)
4. Jimmy Insolo (No. 38)
5. Cecil Gordon† (No. 24)
6. Richard White (No. 42)
7. Hershel McGriff* (No. 04)
8. James Hylton† (No. 48)
9. Jack McCoy (No. 07)
10. Chuck Bown (No. 03)
11. Bill Champion† (No. 10)
12. J.D. McDuffie† (No. 70)
13. Larry Smith† (No. 92)
14. Leon Fox (No. 18)
15. Walter Ballard (No. 30)
16. George Behlman (No. 01)
17. Richard Childress (No. 98)
18. Glenn Francis (No. 33)
19. Elmo Langley† (No. 64)
20. Mike James (No. 31)
21. Johnny Anderson (No. 91)
22. Carl Adams* (No. 9)
23. Don Noel* (No. 88)
24. Cale Yarborough*† (No. 11)
25. Dick Kranzler (No. 4)
26. Jack Simpson (No. 53)
27. Henley Gray (No. 19)
28. Hugh Pearson* (No. 78)
29. Sonny Easley*† (No. 68)
30. Ron Hornaday*† (No. 5)
31. John Soares, Jr.* (No. 3)
32. Dick Bown* (No. 02)
33. Bobby Isaac*† (No. 15)
34. Romie Alderman* (No. 56)
35. Nels Miller* (No. 77)
36. Ray Elder*† (No. 96)
37. Jim Whitt* (No. 60)
38. Buddy Baker* (No. 71)
39. Chuck Wahl* (No. 37)
40. Dean Dalton* (No. 7)

* Driver failed to finish race
† signifies that the driver is known to be deceased

== Timeline ==
Section reference:

- Start: Richard Petty was the first car to leave the start/finish line as the green flag was waved in the air.
- Lap 2: Bobby Allison took over the lead from Richard Petty.
- Lap 11: Problems with the vehicle's valve forced Jim Whitt out of the competition.
- Lap 12: Richard Petty took over the lead from Bobby Allison; Ray Elder's camshaft issue would knock him out of the race.
- Lap 19: The pistons on Nels Miller's race vehicle would make him a non-contender in the race.
- Lap 25: Bobby Allison took over the lead from Richard Petty.
- Lap 26: Richard Petty took over the lead from Bobby Allison.
- Lap 34: Transmission problems would relegate Romie Alderman to the sidelines.
- Lap 37: Bobby Isaac would fail to finish the race due to transmission issues.
- Lap 50: Dick Bown noticed that his engine stopped working.
- Lap 54: Bobby Allison took over the lead from Richard Petty.
- Lap 55: Richard Petty took over the lead from Bobby Allison.
- Lap 56: Bobby Allison took over the lead from Richard Petty; John Soares, Jr.'s vehicle ultimately suffered from ignition problems.
- Lap 62: The head gasket on Ron Hornaday's vehicle suddenly developed problems.
- Lap 67: Richard Petty took over the lead from Bobby Allison.
- Lap 75: Problems with the vehicle's clutch forced Sonnly Easley into a rather miserable 29th-place finish.
- Lap 81: Cale Yarborough took over the lead from Richard Petty.
- Lap 82: Bobby Allison took over the lead from Cale Yarborough.
- Lap 83: Hugh Pearson had a terminal crash.
- Lap 104: Cale Yarborough took over the lead from Bobby Allison.
- Lap 114: Bobby Allison took over the lead from Cale Yarborough; Yarborough's engine stopped working properly.
- Lap 119: The wiring on Don Noel's vehicle started to go haywire.
- Lap 120: Carl Adams' engine suddenly develop troubles.
- Lap 147: Hershel McGriff's vehicles developed problems with its clutch.
- Finish: Bobby Allison was officially declared the winner of the event.

Preceded by 1973 Alamo 500	NASCAR Winston Cup Series Season; 1973	Succeeded by 1973 Motor State 400
