= Mick O'Rourke =

Offaly Gaelic footballer and hurler (1946–2019)

Personal information
- Native name: Mícheál Ó Ruairc (Irish)
- Born: 1946 Killeigh, County Offaly, Ireland
- Died: 26 January 2019 (aged 72) Tullamore, County Offaly, Ireland
- Height: 5 ft 11 in (180 cm)

Sport
- Sport: Gaelic football
- Position: Left corner-back
Club
- Years: Club
- Killeigh
Inter-county
Years	County	Apps (scores)
1968–1976	Offaly	21 (0–0)
Inter-county titles
- Leinster titles: 4
- All-Irelands: 2
- NFL: 0
- All Stars: 0

Michael O'Rourke (1946 – 26 January 2019) was an Irish Gaelic footballer and hurler who played for club side Killeigh and at inter-county level with the Offaly senior team. He usually lined out at left corner-back, but could also be deployed as a forward.

== Career ==
O'Rourke first came to prominence as a member of the Offaly minor team that won the 1964 All-Ireland Championship. He later lined out for the Offaly under-21 and junior teams before making his senior debut against Laois in the 1968 Leinster Championship. O'Rourke had his greatest successes with Offaly as a defender on the teams that won All-Ireland SFC titles in 1971 and 1972. He also won four Leinster SFC medals and lined out for the Offaly senior hurling team during the 1975–76 National League, before retiring from inter-county activity in 1976. He was also a selector with the Offaly senior football team.

== Death ==
O'Rourke died on 26 January 2019.

== Honours ==
Offaly

- All-Ireland Senior Football Championship (2): 1971, 1972
- Leinster Senior Football Championship (4): 1969, 1971, 1972, 1973
- All-Ireland Minor Football Championship (1): 1964
- Leinster Minor Football Championship (1): 1964
