= Ambrose Hickey =

Offaly Gaelic footballer

Personal information
- Native name: Ambrós Ó hÍcí (Irish)
- Born: 1945 Daingean, County Offaly, Ireland
- Died: 10 June 2016 (aged 71) Geashill, County Offaly, Ireland
- Height: 5 ft 11 in (180 cm)

Sport
- Sport: Gaelic football
- Position: Midfield
Club
- Years: Club
- Daingean
Club titles
- Offaly titles: 1
Inter-county
Years	County	Apps (scores)
1965–1969	Offaly	10 (0–4)
Inter-county titles
- Leinster titles: 1
- All-Irelands: 0
- NFL: 0

Ambrose Hickey (1945 – 10 June 2016) was an Irish Gaelic footballer who played as a midfielder and centre-forward for the Offaly senior team.

Born in Daingean, County Offaly, Hickey first played competitive Gaelic football in his youth. He came to prominence while simultaneously experiencing championship successes at underage levels with the Daingean club. Hickey later won a championship medal with the Daingean senior team.

Hickey made his senior inter-county debut during the 1964–65 league. He went on to play a key role for Offaly at midfield, and won a Leinster SFC medal and a National Football League Division 4 medal. He was an All-Ireland SFC runner-up on one occasion.

Throughout his inter-county career Hickey made 10 championship appearances. He retired from inter-county football during the 1969–70 league.

== Career statistics ==
Team	Year	Division	National League		Leinster		All-Ireland		Total	
Team	Year	Division	Apps	Score	Apps	Score	Apps	Score	Apps	Score
Offaly	1964–65	Division 3	2	0–0	1	0–0	0	0–0	3	0–0
Offaly	1965–66	Division 4	0	0–0	0	0–0	0	0–0	0	0–0
Offaly	1966–67	Division 4	0	0–0	2	0–1	0	0–0	2	0–1
Offaly	1967–68	Division 4	4	0–1	2	0–1	0	0–0	6	0–2
Offaly	1968–69	Division 4	3	0–0	3	0–1	2	0–1	8	0–2
Offaly	1969–70	Division 3	1	0–0	0	0–0	0	0–0	1	0–0
Total			10	0–1	8	0–3	2	0–1	20	0–5

== Honours ==
Daingean

- Offaly Senior Football Championship (1): 1965
- Offaly Minor Football Championship (1): 1962

Offaly

- Leinster Senior Football Championship (1): 1969
- National Football League Division 4 (1): 1968–69
