= Paddy McCormack (footballer) =

Offaly Gaelic footballer

Personal information
- Native name: Páidí Mac Cormaic (Irish)
- Born: 1939 (age 86–87) Rhode, County Offaly
- Height: 5 ft 10 in (178 cm)

Sport
- Sport: Gaelic football
- Position: Full-back
Club
- Years: Club
- 1950s–1970s: Rhode
Inter-county
- Years: County
- 1958–1972: Offaly
Inter-county titles
- Leinster titles: 5
- All-Irelands: 2
- NFL: 0
- All Stars: 1

Paddy McCormack (born 1939 in Rhode, County Offaly) is an Irish former sportsman. He played Gaelic football with his local club Rhode and was a member of the Offaly senior county team from 1958 until 1972.
