= Kelleghan =

Kelleghan is a surname. Notable people with the surname include:

- Fiona Kelleghan (born 1965), American science fiction academic and critic
- Pascal Kelleghan, Irish Gaelic footballer
