= Seán Foran =

Offaly Gaelic footballer

Personal information
- Native name: Seán Ó Fuaráin (Irish)
- Born: 1931 Edenderry, County Offaly, Ireland
- Died: 9 July 2015 (aged 84) Edenderry, County Offaly, Ireland

Sport
- Sport: Gaelic football
- Position: Midfield
Club
- Years: Club
- 1948–1972: Edenderry
Club titles
- Offaly titles: 3
Inter-county*
Years	County	Apps (scores)
1949–1963	Offaly	24
Inter-county titles
- Leinster titles: 1
- All-Irelands: 0
- NFL: 0
- *Inter County team apps and scores correct as of 17:57, 10 July 2015.

Seán Foran (1931 – 9 July 2015) was an Irish Gaelic footballer who played as a midfielder for the Offaly senior team.

Born in Edenderry, County Offaly, Foran first played competitive Gaelic football during his schooling at St Mary's Knockbeg College. He arrived on the inter-county scene at the age of seventeen when he first linked up with the Offaly minor team. He made his senior debut during the 1949 championship. Foran immediately became a regular member of the starting fifteen and won one Leinster SFC medal.

A member of the Leinster inter-provincial team on a number of occasions, Foran won one Railway Cup medal. At club level he was a three-time championship medallist with Edenderry.

Throughout his career Foran made 24 championship appearances. He retired from inter-county football during the 1963–64 league.

In retirement from playing Foran became involved in team management and coaching. He was a selector when Offaly won the All-Ireland SFC title in 1982.

Sporting positions
Preceded by	Offaly Senior Football Captain; 1954	Succeeded by
