= Pascal Kelleghan =

Offaly Gaelic footballer

Personal information
- Born: Rhode, County Offaly

Sport
- Sport: Gaelic football
- Position: Full-forward
Club
- Years: Club
- 2000s–: Rhode
Club titles
- Offaly titles: 6
Inter-county
- Years: County
- Offaly
Inter-county titles
- Leinster titles: 0
- All-Irelands: 0
- NFL: 0
- All Stars: 0

Pascal Kelleghan (born in Rhode, County Offaly) is an Irish Gaelic football manager and former player. He represented his local club Rhode on the field of play and also played for the Offaly senior county team.

== Playing career ==
At club level with Rhode, Kelleghan won county championships in 2004, 2005, 2006, 2008, 2010 and 2012.

With his county, Kelleghan played in the 2006 Leinster SFC final, but was on the losing side to Dublin.

== Managerial career ==
Kelleghan managed Meath GAA club Ballinabrackey to county and Leinster Club JFC honours.

In 2012, he led Kildare GAA club Monasterevin to county and Leinster Club IFC titles.

In 2011, he was appointed as manager of the Offaly under-21 football team.

In 2014, he led an Offaly minor team that was expected to have success.
