= 1997–98 National Football League (Ireland) =

Gaelic football competition

League details
- Dates: 19 October 1997 – 26 April 1998
- Teams: 33

League champions
- Winners: Offaly (1st win)
- Captain: Finbarr Cullen
- Manager: Tommy Lyons

League runners-up
- Runners-up: Derry
- Captain: Kieran McKeever

The 1997–98 National Football League, known for sponsorship reasons as the Church & General National Football League, was the 67th staging of the National Football League (NFL), an annual Gaelic football tournament for the Gaelic Athletic Association county teams of Ireland.

The Kerry v Cavan Round 1 game was played at Downing Stadium in New York City, to mark the 50th anniversary of the 1947 All-Ireland Final between the teams at the Polo Grounds. The then Mayor of New York Rudy Giuliani threw the ball in ahead of the game.

Offaly won their first and only league title.

== Format ==
The teams are in four sections, three of 8 teams and one of 9. Each team plays all the other teams in its division once: either home or away. Teams earn 2 points for a win and 1 for a draw. The top two teams in each section contest the NFL quarter-finals.

== Group section ==
=== Group A ===
Team	Pld	W	D	L	Pts	Status
Mayo	7	6	0	0	13	Advance to knockout stage and moved to Division One of the 1998–99 NFL
Galway	7	5	2	0	12	Advance to knockout stage and moved to Division One of the 1998–99 NFL
Laois	7	4	2	1	10	Moved to Division One of the 1998–99 NFL
Leitrim	7	4	1	2	9	Moved to Division One of the 1998–99 NFL
Louth	7	3	0	4	6	Moved to Division Two of the 1998–99 NFL
Fermanagh	7	1	1	5	3	Moved to Division Two of the 1998–99 NFL
Carlow	7	1	1	5	3	Moved to Division Two of the 1998–99 NFL
Kilkenny	7	0	0	7	0	Moved to Division Two of the 1998–99 NFL

=== Group B ===
Team	Pld	W	D	L	Pts	Status
Donegal	7	6	1	0	13	Advance to Knockout stage and moved to Division One of the 1998–99 NFL
Derry	7	5	1	1	11	Advance to Knockout stage and moved to Division One of the 1998–99 NFL
Armagh	7	5	0	2	10	Moved to Division One of the 1998–99 NFL
Meath	7	4	1	2	9	Moved to Division One of the 1998–99 NFL
Longford	7	3	0	4	6	Moved to Division Two of the 1998–99 NFL
Westmeath	7	2	1	4	5	Moved to Division Two of the 1998–99 NFL
Antrim	7	1	0	6	2	Moved to Division Two of the 1998–99 NFL
London	7	0	0	7	0	Moved to Division Two of the 1998–99 NFL

=== Group C ===
Team	Pld	W	D	L	Pts	Status
Offaly	7	6	1	0	13	Advance to knockout stage and moved to Division One of the 1998–99 NFL
Monaghan	7	4	1	2	9	Advance to knockout stage and moved to Division One of the 1998–99 NFL
Dublin	7	4	0	3	8	Moved to Division One of the 1998–99 NFL
Tyrone	7	4	0	3	8	Moved to Division One of the 1998–99 NFL
Sligo	7	3	2	2	8	Moved to Division Two of the 1998–99 NFL
Kerry	7	3	0	4	6	Moved to Division Two of the 1998–99 NFL
Cavan	7	2	0	5	4	Moved to Division Two of the 1998–99 NFL
Wexford	7	0	0	7	0	Moved to Division Two of the 1998–99 NFL

=== Group D ===
Team	Pld	W	D	L	Pts	Status
Down	8	6	0	2	12	Advance to quarter-finals and moved to Division One of the 1998–99 NFL
Cork	8	6	0	2	12	Advance to quarter-finals and moved to Division One of the 1998–99 NFL
Kildare	8	6	0	2	12	Moved to Division One of the 1998–99 NFL
Clare	8	4	1	3	9	Moved to Division One of the 1998–99 NFL
Wicklow	8	4	1	3	9	Moved to Division Two of the 1998–99 NFL
Tipperary	8	4	0	4	8	Moved to Division Two of the 1998–99 NFL
Roscommon	8	2	2	4	6	Moved to Division Two of the 1998–99 NFL
Limerick	8	1	1	6	3	Moved to Division Two of the 1998–99 NFL
Waterford	8	0	1	7	1	Moved to Division Two of the 1998–99 NFL

== Knockout stage ==
=== Quarter-finals ===
5 April 1998

Derry	1-9 – 0-10	Mayo

Markievicz Park, Sligo

5 April 1998

Offaly	1-11 – 0-10	Galway

Dr Hyde Park, Roscommon

5 April 1998

Donegal	2-14 – 1-9	Cork

Croke Park, Dublin

5 April 1998

Monaghan	2-6 – 1-8	Down

Croke Park, Dublin

=== Semi-finals ===
12 April 1998

Offaly	3-10 – 1-14	Donegal

Croke Park, Dublin

12 April 1998

Derry	1-12 – 0-8	Monaghan

Croke Park, Dublin

=== Finals ===
26 April 1998
Final

Offaly	0-9 – 0-7	Derry

Croke Park, Dublin
Attendance: 22,531
Referee: Niall Barrett (Cork)
