= 1998–99 National Football League (Ireland) =

Gaelic football competition

League details
- Dates: 1 November 1998 – 9 May 1999
- Teams: 33

League champions
- Winners: Cork (5th win)
- Captain: Philip Clifford
- Manager: Larry Tompkins

League runners-up
- Runners-up: Dublin
- Captain: Dessie Farrell
- Manager: Tommy Carr

Other division winners
- Division 2A: Kerry
- Division 2B: Sligo

The 1998–99 National Football League, known for sponsorship reasons as the Church & General National Football League, was the 68th staging of the National Football League (NFL), an annual Gaelic football tournament for the Gaelic Athletic Association county teams of Ireland.

Cork beat Dublin in the final. The tournament introduced yellow and red cards to Gaelic football for the first time. It also had an experimental rule forbidding goalkeepers from handpassing the ball — this latter rule was not continued.

== Format ==
The top 16 teams are drawn into sections 1A and 1B. The other 17 teams are drawn into sections 2A and 2B. Each team plays all the other teams in its section once: either home or away. Teams earn 2 points for a win and 1 for a draw.

=== Titles ===
Teams in both divisions competed for the National Football League title.

=== Knockout stage qualifiers ===
Eight teams qualify for the NFL quarter-finals:

- The top three teams in each of sections 1A and 1B
- The first-placed teams in each of sections 2A and 2B

=== Promotion and relegation ===
- Division One (A): bottom 2 teams demoted to Division Two
- Division One (B): bottom 2 teams demoted to Division Two
- Division Two (A): top 2 teams promoted to Division One.
- Division Two (B): top 2 teams promoted to Division One.

== Group stage ==
=== Division One ===
==== Final standings ====
===== Group A =====
Team	Pld	W	D	L	F	A	Aver	Pts	Notes
Armagh	7	5	1	1	11-68	6-67	1.188	11	Advance to Knockout stage
Cork	7	4	1	2	7-65	4-64	1.132	9	Advance to Knockout stage
Dublin	7	3	2	2	4-90	4-69	1.259	8	Advance to Knockout stage
Tyrone	7	3	2	2	3-67	4-60	1.056	8
Galway	7	3	1	3	8-78	5-76	1.121	7
Donegal	7	3	0	4	4-70	3-64	1.123	6
Offaly	7	2	2	3	5-59	5-62	0.961	6	Relegated to Division Two of the 1999–2000 NFL
Leitrim	7	0	1	6	6-47	17-82	0.489	1	Relegated to Division Two of the 1999–2000 NFL

===== Group B =====
Team	Pld	W	D	L	F	A	Aver	Pts	Notes
Meath	7	4	1	2	8-56	1-41	1.818	9	Advance to Knockout stage
Kildare	7	4	1	2	3-61	2-58	1.094	9	Advance to Knockout stage
Derry	7	3	2	2	4-62	3-51	1.233	8	Advance to Knockout stage
Mayo	7	3	2	2	8-58	9-46	1.123	8
Clare	7	3	1	3	6-51	2-55	1.131	7
Down	7	3	1	3	5-55	6-67	0.824	7
Monaghan	7	3	1	3	1-57	6-63	0.741	7	Relegated to Division Two of the 1999–2000 NFL
Laois	7	0	1	6	2-48	6-67	0.593	1	Relegated to Division Two of the 1999–2000 NFL

=== Division two ===
==== Final standings ====
===== Group A =====
Team	Pld	W	D	L	F	A	Aver	Pts	Notes
Kerry	8	7	0	1	10-97	3-54	2.016	14	Advance to Knockout stage; Promoted to Division One of the 1999–2000 NFL
Roscommon	8	7	0	1	12-85	2-58	1.891	14	Promoted to Division One of the 1999–2000 NFL
Westmeath	8	6	0	2	15-89	5-64	1.696	12
Wicklow	8	6	0	2	7-84	2-64	1.500	12
Louth	8	4	0	4	7-82	6-56	1.392	8
Antrim	8	2	0	6	7-79	9-86	0.885	4
Limerick	8	2	0	6	6-60	10-83	0.690	4
London	8	2	0	6	2-64	10-79	0.642	4
Kilkenny	8	0	0	8	2-24	21-120	0.164	0

===== Group B =====
Team	Pld	W	D	L	F	A	Aver	Pts	Notes
Sligo	7	5	1	1	7-71	4-55	1.373	11	Advance to Knockout stage; Promoted to Division One of the 1999–2000 NFL
Fermanagh	7	4	2	1	7-71	2-62	1.353	10	Promoted to Division One of the 1999–2000 NFL
Carlow	7	5	0	2	7-67	7-59	1.100	10
Wexford	7	4	0	3	8-72	5-68	1.157	8
Cavan	7	4	0	3	7-77	9-70	1.010	8
Longford	7	3	0	4	8-71	9-80	0.888	6
Tipperary	7	1	1	5	7-62	6-68	0.965	3
Waterford	7	0	0	7	4-51	13-80	0.529	0

== Knockout stage ==
=== Quarter-finals ===
11 April 1999

Armagh	0-6 – 0-5	Sligo

Pearse Park, Longford

11 April 1999

Meath	0-14 – 0-10	Kerry

Gaelic Grounds, Limerick

11 April 1999

Cork	3-14 – 1-6	Derry

Croke Park, Dublin

11 April 1999

Dublin	1-17 – 2-8	Kildare

Croke Park, Dublin

=== Semi-finals ===
25 April 1999

Cork	0-6 – 0-3	Meath

25 April 1999

Dublin	0-11 – 0-11	Armagh

2 May 1999
Replay

Dublin	1-14 – 0-12	Armagh

=== Finals ===
9 May 1999
Final

Cork	0-12 – 1-7	Dublin

Páirc Uí Chaoimh, Cork
Attendance: 10,000
Referee: Brian White (Wexford)
