= R441 road (Ireland) =

Road in Ireland

Coordinates: 53.354242°N 7.133867°W

R441 road
- Bóthar R441

Route information
- Length: 10.8 km (6.7 mi)

Major junctions
- From: R400 Rhode
- To: R402 Edenderry

Location
- Country: Ireland

Highway system
- Roads in Ireland; Motorways; Primary; Secondary; Regional

The R441 road, also called the Rhode–Edenderry Road, is a regional road in Ireland, located in County Offaly.
