= Anton Sullivan =

Offaly Gaelic footballer

Personal information
- Born: 1991/1992
- Occupation: Peacekeeper

Sport
- Sport: Gaelic football
Club
- Years: Club
- Rhode
Inter-county
- Years: County
- Offaly

Anton Sullivan (born 1991/1992) is a Gaelic footballer who plays for Rhode and at senior level for the Offaly county team.

Sullivan is a peacekeeper and has experienced service in the Lebanon. He was appointed as Offaly captain in 2018, shortly after returning to Ireland.

He was named on the Tailteann Cup Team of the Year at the end of the 2022 campaign.
