= 1965 All-Ireland Minor Football Championship =

Gaelic football competition

Championship details

All-Ireland Champions
- Winning team: Derry (1st win)

All-Ireland Finalists
- Losing team: Kerry

Provincial Champions
- Munster: Kerry
- Leinster: Offaly
- Ulster: Derry
- Connacht: Roscommon

The 1965 All-Ireland Minor Football Championship was the 34th staging of the All-Ireland Minor Football Championship, the Gaelic Athletic Association's premier inter-county Gaelic football tournament for boys under the age of 18.

Offaly entered the championship as defending champions, however, they were defeated in the All-Ireland semi-final.

On 26 September 1965, Derry won the championship following a 2-8 to 2-4 defeat of Kerry in the All-Ireland final. This was their first All-Ireland title.

== Results ==
=== Connacht Minor Football Championship ===
Quarter-Finals

1965 Quarter-Final	Leitrim	0-04 – 1-11	Sligo

Semi-Finals

1965 Semi-Final	Roscommon	3-06 – 0-05	Sligo	Kilcoyne Park, Tubbercurry

1965 Semi-Final	Galway	2-02 – 3-18	Mayo	McHale Park, Castlebar

Final

1 August 1965 Final	Roscommon	2-10 – 1-10	Mayo	Tuam Stadium, Tuam

=== Leinster Minor Football Championship ===
Preliminary round

1965 Preliminary round	Wexford	5-07 – 0-04	Kilkenny	O'Kennedy Park, New Ross

1965 Preliminary round	Offaly	2-08 – 2-06	Longford	Cusack Park, Mullingar

1965 Preliminary round	Kildare	2-09 – 0-04	Wicklow	Dr Cullen Park, Carlow

1965 Preliminary round	Westmeath	3-06 – 0-06	Louth	Páirc Tailteann, Navan

Quarter-Finals

1965 Quarter-Final	Kildare	3-06 – 2-05	Carlow	O'Moore Park, Portlaoise

1965 Quarter-Final	Dublin	2-11 – 0-02	Wexford	Dr Cullen Park, Carlow

1965 Quarter-Final	Meath	2-10 – 1-03	Westmeath	Croke Park, Dublin

1965 Quarter-Final	Offaly	3-08 – 1-06	Laois	St Conleth's Park, Newbridge

Semi-Finals

1965 Semi-Final	Kildare	1-07 – 0-08	Dublin	Croke Park, Dublin

1965 Semi-Final	Offaly	5-11 – 0-02	Meath	Croke Park, Dublin

Final

25 July 1965 Final	Offaly	2-11 – 1-05	Kildare	Croke Park, Dublin

=== Munster Minor Football Championship ===
Quarter-Finals

1965 Quarter-Final	Waterford	3-07 – 2-04	Limerick	Seán Treacy Park, Tipperary

1965 Quarter-Final	Tipperary	0-05 – 0-05	Clare	Gaelic Grounds, Limerick

1965 Quarter-Final Replay	Tipperary	1-05 – 0-05	Clare	Gaelic Grounds, Limerick

Semi-Finals

1965 Semi-Final	Cork	1-08 – 1-03	Waterford	Castle Grounds, Lismore

1965 Semi-Final	Kerry	1-15 – 0-04	Tipperary	Ballylongford

Final

18 July 1965 Final	Kerry	3-11 – 1-05	Cork	Gaelic Grounds, Limerick

=== Ulster Minor Football Championship ===
Quarter-Finals

1965 Quarter-Final	Cavan	2-11 – 2-07	Antrim	Breffni Park, Cavan

1965 Quarter-Final	Derry	3-17 – 0-03	Donegal	Dungiven

1965 Quarter-Final	Fermanagh	1-08 – 2-09	Down	Lisnaskea

Semi-Finals

1965 Semi-Final	Derry	2-07 – 2-06	Down	Breffni Park, Cavan

1965 Semi-Final	Tyrone	2-05 – 1-08	Cavan	Pairc Esler, Newry

1965 Semi-Final Replay	Tyrone	0-05 – 1-05	Cavan

Final

1 August 1965 Final	Derry	3-11 – 2-04	Cavan	St. Tiernach's Park, Clones

=== All-Ireland Minor Football Championship ===
Semi-Finals

8 August 1965 Semi-Final	Kerry	2-14 - 0-11	Offaly	Croke Park, Dublin

22 August 1965 Semi-Final	Derry	4-08 - 4-05	Roscommon	Croke Park, Dublin

Final

26 September 1965 Final	Derry	2-08 - 2-04	Kerry	Croke Park, Dublin

== Championship statistics ==
=== Miscellaneous ===
- Derry win the Ulster title for the first time in their history. This provincial triumph is later translated into All-Ireland success.
