= Joe Cassidy (Gaelic footballer) =

Irish retired Gaelic footballer

Personal information
- Native name: Seosamh Ó Caiside (Irish)
- Born: 2 April 1977 (age 49) Bellaghy, County Londonderry, Northern Ireland
- Occupation: PE teacher
- Height: 6 ft 2 in (188 cm)

Sport
- Sport: Gaelic football
- Position: Corner forward
Club
- Years: Club
- 1994-2007: Bellaghy
Club titles
- Derry titles: 6 senior
- Ulster titles: 2 senior
Inter-county
- Years: County
- 1997-2001: Derry
Inter-county titles
- Ulster titles: 1 senior, 1 u21, 1 minor
- All-Irelands: 1 U-21 all Ireland
- NFL: 1
- All Stars: All star nominee 1997, Irish news Allstar 1997

Joe Cassidy (born 2 April 1977) is an Irish retired Gaelic footballer and currently a manager. He played for Derry between 1997 and 2001. Cassidy played his club football for Bellaghy Wolfe Tones and won the Ulster Senior Club Football Championship twice, and the Derry Senior Football Championship 6 times with the club. For both club and county Cassidy played in forward line.

A back injury forced Cassidy to retire from playing at an early age. He has since become involved in managing and is currently manager of Con Magees Glenravel. Cassidy is brother of former Derry player and current Derry manager Damian Cassidy.

== Playing career ==
=== Inter-county ===
Cassidy was part of the Derry minor team that won the 1995 Ulster Minor Championship and finished runners-up to Westmeath in that year's All-Ireland Minor final.

In 1997 Cassidy and Derry won the Ulster Under 21 and All-Ireland Under-21 Football Championships, defeating Fermanagh and Meath in the respective finals. He was also on the team the following year, but Derry were defeated at the Ulster final stage by Armagh.

He made his Derry senior debut in February 1997 against Kildare in the National League. Derry reached that year's Ulster Championship final but were defeated by Cavan. A year later he won the Ulster Championship with Derry, beating Donegal in the final. Derry lost out to Galway in that year's All-Ireland Championship semi-final. In 2000 he won the National League with Derry??. Derry also reached that year's Ulster final but were defeated by Armagh.

=== Club ===
Cassidy had a successful underage career with Bellaghy; including winning two Derry Minor Championships and two Ulster Minor Club Championships, as well as a Derry Under 21 Championship.

Among his club awards at senior level include winning the Derry Championship in 1994, 1996, 1998?, 1999?, 2000? and 2005? In 1994 and 2000 the club also went on to win the Ulster Senior Club Football Championship. In 1995 they reached the All-Ireland Senior Club Football Championship final, but were defeated by Kilmacud Crokes of Dublin. He has also won the All-Ireland Kilmacud Sevens in 2002 and was the captain of that victorious winning team and the 2002 Castlewellan Sevens with the club. He was also the top scorer in the Derry Senior championship in 2005 scoring 21 points in 4 games.

=== School ===
Cassidy's playing honours with his school include an All-Ireland B Colleges title, and 6 Ulster colleges titles with St Mary's Magherafelt.

== Managerial career ==
Joe Cassidy
Sport
Club management
- Years: Club
- 200x-200x 2009-: Loughgiel (hurling); Bellaghy

=== Club ===
Cassidy first started managing Bellaghy underage teams in 1998. He managed and coached the wolfe Tones club to U-12, U-14 and U-16 county titles. In 2005 he guided the Bellaghy minor side to the final of the Derry Minor Championship, where they were defeated by Ballinascreen. The first senior club he was involved in was Loughgiel Shamrocks (as trainer)(hurling) in Antrim. They won Antrim Senior league and Senior Feis titles although they lost consecutive county finals during his reign. In late 2008 he was appointed as the Bellaghy senior manager for the 2009 season. He stayed in charge for 3 seasons. Joe then was named as part of McQuilan's, Ballycastle Senior hurling Management for 3 seasons helping them to 2 U21 championships but the seniors could not make the breakthrough. He then went back into football management in 2015 and led Greenlough to a historic double - Intermediate League & Championship - both seniors & reserves.

=== School ===
Cassidy is a PE teacher in Cross and Passion College in Ballycastle, and has had some successes managing the school hurling teams winning numerous Ulster Colleges titles and he coached the senior team in school to the All-Ireland Colleges Hurling title (April 2009), the first Antrim school in 30 years to do so. He then backed this up in 2010 and finally in April 2015 he and co-manager Oran Kearney led them to their 3rd All Ireland Title in 7 years. Under their stewardship they have won 5 Mageean Cup titles (Ulster Senior Colleges Titles) and 3 All Ireland's in the past 10 years.
