= Brendan Reilly (doctor) =

American doctor

Brendan Reilly is an American doctor.

During his tenure as chair of medicine and Physician-in-Chief at Cook County Hospital, it was the inspiration and setting for ER.

== Early life and education ==
Reilly grew up in New York City. Reilly graduated from Cornell University Medical College in 1973.

Reilly completed his residency in Internal Medicine at Dartmouth-Hitchcock Medical Center 1973 - 1977.

== Career ==
Reilly worked at Dartmouth College, the University of Rochester, and Rush University Medical College in Chicago. He was Professor of Medicine at Weill Cornell Medical College and executive vice chair of medicine at New York Presbyterian Hospital in New York City.

== Published works ==
- One Doctor: Close Calls, Cold Cases and the Mystery of Medicine, Simon & Schuster
