= Finbarr Cullen =

Offaly hurler and Gaelic footballer

Personal information
- Born: Edenderry, County Offaly

Sport
- Sport: Gaelic football
- Position: Half-back
Club
- Years: Club
- 1980s–2000s: Edenderry
Club titles
- Offaly titles: 4
Inter-county
- Years: County
- 1991–2003: Offaly
Inter-county titles
- Leinster titles: 1
- NFL: 1
- All Stars: 0

Finbarr Cullen is an Irish former dual player of Gaelic football and hurling who played for the Offaly senior football team from 1991 until 2003.

Cullen captained Offaly to the 1997 Leinster SFC title and the 1998 National Football League title. He was typically a half-back. To the annoyance of Offaly senior football manager Tommy Lyons, Cullen lost three of his teeth during a game against Dublin in 1997. In late 2003, Offaly senior football manager Gerry Fahey dropped Cullen from his panel.

Cullen also won Leinster MHC and All-Ireland MHC titles with Offaly in 1989.

He played at club level with Edenderry, winning Offaly SFC titles in 1995, 1997, 1999 and 2001.
