= 1988 All-Ireland Under-21 Football Championship =

Gaelic football competition

Championship details

All-Ireland Champions
- Winning team: Offaly (1st win)
- Captain: Garrett O'Brien
- Manager: Jody Gunning

All-Ireland Finalists
- Losing team: Cavan

Provincial Champions
- Munster: Kerry
- Leinster: Offaly
- Ulster: Cavan
- Connacht: Galway

The 1988 All-Ireland Under-21 Football Championship was the 25th staging of the All-Ireland Under-21 Football Championship since its establishment by the Gaelic Athletic Association in 1964.

Donegal entered the championship as defending champions, however, they were defeated in the Ulster Championship.

On 26 June 1988, Offaly won the championship following an 0-11 to 0-9 defeat of Cavan in the All-Ireland final. This was their second All-Ireland title overall and their first in five championship seasons.

== Results ==
=== All-Ireland Under-21 Football Championship ===
Semi-finals

8 May 1988 Semi-final	Cavan	1-15 - 0-10	Galway	Páirc Seán Mac Diarmada, Carrick

15 May 1988 Semi-final	Offaly	1-11 - 2-08	Kerry	Bruff Sportsfield, Bruff

10 June 1988 Semi-final replay	Offaly	2-07 - 1-09	Kerry	Bruff Sportsfield, Bruff

Finals

26 June 1988 Final	Offaly	0-11 - 0-09	Cavan	Pearse Park, Longford

== Statistics ==
=== Miscellaneous ===
- Cavan win the Ulster title for the first time in their history.
