= Brendan Reilly (Louth Gaelic footballer) =

Irish Gaelic footballer

Brendan Reilly (5 January 1979 – 16 September 2017) was an Irish Gaelic footballer. He came from a farming family outside Ardee, County Louth. At club level, he played with his local team John Mitchels (partly founded by his father Eugene Reilly) and later Naomh Máirtín.

He represented his county Louth at senior level for several years, winning a National Football League Division 2 medal in 2000.

In 2017, he died suddenly after leading his Naomh Máirtín team to victory in a quarter-final of the Louth Senior Football Championship.
