= Shannonbridge GAA =

GAA club in County Offaly

Shannonbridge
- Rachra
- Founded: 1973
- County: Offaly
- Colours: Blue and yellow
- Grounds: Shannonbridge GAA Grounds

Playing kits
Standard colours

Senior Club Championships
| | All Ireland | Leinster champions | Offaly champions |
|---|---|---|---|
| Football: | 0 | 0 | 1 |

Shannonbridge GAA is a Gaelic Athletic Association club in Shannonbridge, County Offaly, Ireland. The club is primarily concerned with the game of Gaelic football.

== History ==
Located in the village of Shannonbridge, on the Offaly-Galway-Roscommon border, Shannonbridge GAA Club was founded in 1973. An earlier club, named St Kieran's, had existed in the area but became defunct in the 1940s. Shannonbridge spent most of its early existence operating in the junior grade and won the Offaly JAFC title in 1989. Two years later, the club claimed the Offaly IFC title to secure top flight status for the first time. After losing to Ferbane in 1994, Shannonbridge claimed the Offaly SFC in 1996 after a 1–11 to 0–12 defeat of Tullamore.

== Honours ==
- Offaly Senior Football Championship (1): 1996
- Offaly Intermediate Football Championship (1): 1991
- Offaly Junior A Football Championship (1): 1989

== Notable players ==
- John Ryan: All-Ireland SHC-winner (1998)
