= Daingean GAA =

Gaelic games club in County Offaly, Ireland

Daingean
- Daingean
- Founded: 1889
- County: Offaly
- Colours: Maroon and white
- Grounds: Fortyacres, Daingean

Playing kits
Standard colours

Senior Club Championships
	All Ireland	Leinster champions	Offaly champions
Football:	0	0	3

Daingean GAA is a Gaelic Athletic Association club located in Daingean, County Offaly, Ireland. The club is almost exclusively concerned with the game of Gaelic football and participates in competitions organized by the Offaly County Board.

== Early years ==
The Phillipstown Mandevilles club was founded in June 1889 and named in honour of the recently deceased Fenian John Mandeville. The new club's first game was a friendly against Rathangan. Like most clubs in Offaly at this time, the bitter Parnellite split of 1890 ended the playing of games for the rest of the decade. The club was restarted in 1900, however, a rival club called Killeen Emmets was also established. Success eluded both clubs until 1908 when a united effort saw Phillipstown take the Offaly JFC title for the first time.

== Honours ==
- Offaly Senior Football Championship: 1909, 1962, 1965
- Offaly Senior B Football Championship: 1987
- Offaly Intermediate Football Championship: 1954, 2002, 2022
- Offaly Junior A Football Championship: 1908, 1927, 1937, 1953, 2014, 2020
- Offaly Minor A Football Championship: 1936, 1937

== Notable players ==
- Ambrose Hickey
- Kevin Kilmurray
