= 1964 All-Ireland Minor Football Championship =

Gaelic football competition

Championship details

All-Ireland Champions
- Winning team: Offaly (1st win)

All-Ireland Finalists
- Losing team: Cork

Provincial Champions
- Munster: Cork
- Leinster: Offaly
- Ulster: Antrim
- Connacht: Mayo

The 1964 All-Ireland Minor Football Championship was the 33rd staging of the All-Ireland Minor Football Championship, the Gaelic Athletic Association's premier inter-county Gaelic football tournament for boys under the age of 18.

Kerry entered the championship as defending champions, however, they were defeated in the Munster Championship.

On 27 September 1964, Offaly won the championship following a 0-15 to 1-11 defeat of Cork in the All-Ireland final. This was their first All-Ireland title. It remains their only title in the minor grade.

== Results ==
=== Connacht Minor Football Championship ===
Semi-Finals

1964 Semi-Final	Mayo	2-14 - 2-07	Leitrim	Páirc Seán Mac Diarmada, Carrick-on-Shannon

1964 Semi-Final	Galway	3-10 - 0-04	Sligo	Tuam Stadium, Tuam

Final

19 July 1964 Final	Galway	1-03 - 2-07	Mayo	Tuam Stadium, Tuam
				Attendance: 35,000

=== Leinster Minor Football Championship ===
First round

1964 First Round	Kildare	3-16 – 2-03	Kilkenny	St Conleth's Park, Newbridge

1964 First Round	Westmeath	2-09 – 0-08	Longford	Pearse Park, Longford

Second round

1964 Second Round	Carlow	3-04 – 1-08	Wicklow	Geraldine Park, Athy

1964 Second Round	Louth	2-07 – 0-09	Wexford	Croke Park, Dublin

1964 Second Round	Kildare	5-09 – 0-02	Westmeath	Croke Park, Dublin

Quarter-Finals

1964 Quarter-Final	Louth	2-07 – 0-09	Westmeath	Croke Park, Dublin

1964 Quarter-Final	Laois	3-10 – 2-06	Westmeath	Páirc Ciarán, Athlone

1964 Quarter-Final	Dublin	4-07 – 2-06	Carlow	O'Connor Park, Tullamore

1964 Quarter-Final	Offaly	1-14 – 0-04	Louth	Croke Park, Tullamore

Semi-Finals

1964 Semi-Final	Laois	3-07 – 2-05	Dublin	O'Connor Park, Tullamore

1964 Semi-Final	Offaly	4-09 – 2-08	Kildare	O'Moore Park, Portlaoise

Final

26 July 1964 Final	Offaly	1-07 – 1-06	Laois	Croke Park, Dublin

=== Munster Minor Football Championship ===
Quarter-Finals

1964 Quarter-Final	Kerry	4-20 – 2-00	Limerick	Austin Stack Park, Tralee

1964 Quarter-Final	Clare	2-06 – 1-06	Tipperary	Gaelic Grounds, Limerick

Semi-Finals

1964 Semi-Final	Cork	9-12 – 2-03	Waterford	Páirc Mhic Gearailt, Fermoy

1964 Semi-Final	Kerry	3-08 – 4-09	Clare	Cusack Park, Ennis

Final

19 July 1964 Final	Cork	4-11 – 0-05	Clare	Cork Athletic Grounds, Cork

=== Ulster Minor Football Championship ===
Round Robin

1964 Round Robin	Down	5-09 – 1-11	Tyrone	The Playing Fields, Lurgan

1964 Round Robin	Derry	0-04 – 7-08	Down	The Playing Fields, Lurgan

1964 Round Robin	Donegal	0-01 – 1-05	Tyrone	O'Neill Park, Dungannon

Quarter-Finals

1964 Quarter-Final	Monaghan	1-12 – 2-06	Tyrone	St. Molaise Park, Irvinestown

1964 Quarter-Final	Armagh	3-07 – 3-03	Down	Pairc Esler, Newry

1964 Quarter-Final	Antrim	1-09 – 1-07	Derry	Casement Park, Belfast

Semi-Finals

1964 Semi-Final	Cavan	2-07 – 1-10	Monaghan	St Tiernach's Park, Clones

1964 Semi-Final Replay	Cavan	3-10 – 3-07	Monaghan	Breffni Park, Cavan

1964 Semi-Final	Armagh	0-07 – 3-03	Antrim	Pairc Esler, Newry

Final

19 July 1964 Final	Cavan	0-06 – 2-10	Antrim	Casement Park, Belfast

=== All-Ireland Minor Football Championship ===
Semi-Finals

9 August 1964 Semi-Final	Offaly	1-10- 1-08	Mayo	Croke Park, Dublin

23 August 1964 Semi-Final	Antrim	2-06 - 2-11	Cork	Croke Park, Dublin

Final

27 September 1964 Final	Offaly	0-15 - 1-11	Cork	Croke Park, Dublin
