= Rhode, County Offaly =

Village in County Offaly, Ireland

Rhode Ród
- Village
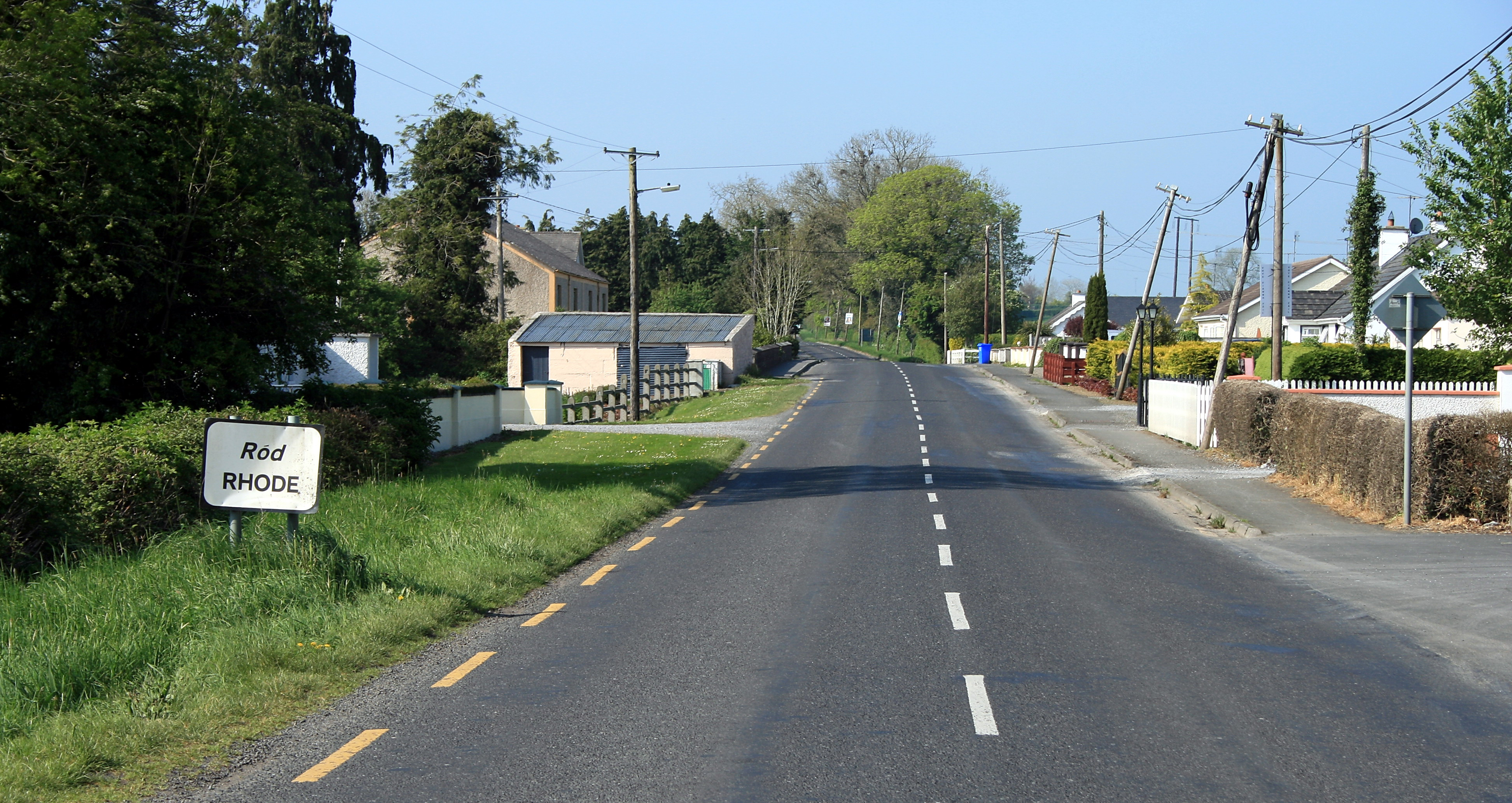
- Rhode, approaching from the North on the R400

- Location in Ireland
- Coordinates: 53°20′58″N 7°11′57″W
- Country: Ireland
- Province: Leinster
- County: County Offaly

Population (2016)
  - Total: 811
- Time zone: UTC+0 (WET)
  - Summer (DST): UTC+1 (IST (WEST))
- Eircode routing key: R35
- Irish Grid Reference: N533335

Rhode (Irish: Ród) is a village in County Offaly, Ireland. It is situated on the R400 at its junction with the R441 which leads to Edenderry, 12 km to the east. Rhode village is on an "island" of high ground surrounded by an expanse of raised bog which forms part of the Bog of Allen.

== History ==
The Grand Canal, which was completed in the early 1800s, lies just south of the village, where it is crossed by Rhode Bridge (built c.1797). Several of the village's larger buildings, including Saint Peter's Roman Catholic church (original built 1816), date to the early 19th century.

The modern village of Rhode expanded around a peat-burning power plant operated by the Electricity Supply Board which was supplied with milled peat by Bord na Móna. The plant was shut down in 2003 and its cooling towers were demolished in March 2004, removing a highly visible landmark.

== Amenities ==
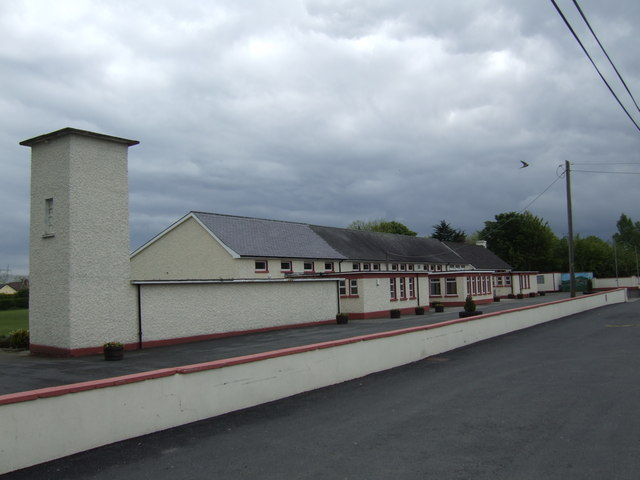
Rhode National School, Scoil Mhuire Naofa

The local national (primary) school, Scoil Mhuire Naofa, opened in 1959. As of 2020, the school had over 150 pupils enrolled. The local GAA team, Rhode GAA, has won the most Offaly Senior Football Championship titles of any club in the county. The village has three pubs, two takeaways, two shops, a filling station, several hairdressers and a pharmacy. In the centre of the village is a playground and park.

== People ==
- John Dunne (1846–1916), an Australian Roman Catholic priest and bishop.
- William Fletcher (1750–1823), High Court judge
