= Edenderry GAA =

Offaly-based Gaelic games club

Edenderry
- Éadan Doire
- Founded: 1891
- County: Offaly
- Colours: Red and white
- Grounds: Weavers Fields, Edenderry
- Coordinates: 53.3506°N 7.0525°W

Playing kits
Standard colours

Senior Club Championships
	All Ireland	Leinster champions	Offaly champions
Football:	-	-	11

Edenderry GAA is a Gaelic Athletic Association club based in Edenderry, County Offaly, Ireland. It participates in competitions organised by the Offaly GAA county board. The club fields both Gaelic football and hurling teams.

Paul O'Kelly, who was a selector under Tommy Lyons when the Offaly county team won the 1997 Leinster Senior Football Championship and the 1997–98 National Football League, is from the Edenderry club. O'Kelly later served as manager of the county team himself.

== Notable players ==
- Gerry Carroll
- Finbarr Cullen
- Seán Evans
- Cillian Farrell
- Seán Foran

== Achievements ==
- Offaly Senior Football Championship (11 titles): 1936, 1951, 1953, 1957, 1985, 1995, 1997, 1999, 2001, 2011, 2015
- Offaly Senior Hurling Championship (0 titles): Runners-Up 1911, 1913, 1940
- Offaly Intermediate Football Championship (1 title): 2007
- Offaly Intermediate Hurling Championship (3 titles): 1935, 1954, 1963
- Offaly Junior Football Championship (4 titles): 1925, 1933, 1997, 2024
- Offaly Junior A Hurling Championship (5 titles): 1929, 1953, 1962, 1998, 2022
- Offaly Junior B Hurling Championship (1 title): 2020
