= Gracefield GAA =

GAA club in County Offaly

Gracefield GAA (Irish: Pairc de Grás) is a Gaelic football and ladies' Gaelic football club in Gracefield, County Offaly, Ireland. Their most notable period was in 1970, when they won the Leinster Senior Club Football Championship.

Martin Murphy from the club was an Offaly selector under Liam Kearns and succeeded Kearns as Offaly senior manager when Kearns died unexpectedly during the 2023 National League campaign.

== Honours ==
- Leinster Senior Club Football Championship: 1
  - 1971
- Offaly Senior Football Championship: 4
  - 1961, 1970, 1972, 1984
- Offaly Junior Football Championship: 2
  - 1930, 1958
- Offaly Junior Hurling A championship 2 1984, 1992
- Offaly Junior Hurling B championship: 4 1982, 1983, 2013, 2026
