= Rhode GAA =

Gaelic games club in County Offaly, Ireland

Rhode
- Ród
- Founded: 1888
- County: Offaly
- Colours: Green and Gold
- Grounds: Rhode
- Coordinates: 53°21′16.91″N 7°12′20.32″W

Playing kits
Standard colours

Senior Club Championships
	All Ireland	Leinster champions	Offaly champions
Football:	0	0	31

Rhode GAA is a Gaelic Athletic Association club located just outside the Village of Rhode in County Offaly, Ireland. With 30 Senior Football wins they are the most successful team in Offaly GAA football history.

== History ==
The first recorded football match played by Rhode was on 17 March 1889 against Portarlington GAA. The outcome was a defeat for Rhode. The first appearance for Rhode in an Offaly football final was in 1891, however the match was unofficial and the facts about the match are unclear. Rhode's first official finals appearance was on 21 July 1900. It was also Rhode's first Championship win with the match ending Rhode 0−7, Daingean 0−2.

== Handball ==
Fahy's Cross handball Club is located a mile north of Rhode, and is the Gaelic handball team of Rhode. The club, though small, has been successful over the years, with numerous Irish titles being won by Paddy Hope, David Hope and Nolie Murphy.

== Notable players ==
- Anton Sullivan, appointed Offaly captain in 2018

== Honours ==
- Leinster Senior Club Football Championship Runners-Up 2006, 2008, 2010, 2014, 2016
- Offaly Senior Football Championships: 30
  - 1900, 1918, 1920, 1923, 1927, 1928, 1931, 1939, 1940, 1944, 1949, 1955, 1958, 1966, 1967, 1969, 1975, 1998, 2004, 2005, 2006, 2008, 2010, 2012, 2014, 2016 2017, 2018, 2020,2022
- Offaly Intermediate Football Championships: (1)
  - 2011
- Offaly Junior A Football Championships: (4)
  - 1917, 1994, 2003, 2008
- Offaly Junior B Football Championships: (2)
- Offaly Junior B Hurling Championships: (1)

== External sources ==
Preceded by Edenderry	Offaly Senior Football Champions; 2012	Succeeded by Tullamore
