= Offaly Senior Football Championship =

Irish Gaelic football league

- Current season or competition: 2026 Offaly Senior Football Championship
- Irish: Craobh Sinsear Peile; Uíbh Fhailí
- Founded: 1896
- Title holders: Tullamore (32nd title)
- Most titles: Tullamore (32 titles)
- Sponsors: Tullamore Court Hotel

The Offaly Senior Football Championship is an annual Gaelic football competition contested by top-tier Offaly GAA clubs. The Offaly County Board of the Gaelic Athletic Association has organised it since 1896.

Tullamore are the title holders (2026), defeating Ferbane on a scoreline of 2-16 to 1-13 in the final.

== Format ==
Current teams

The 8 clubs competing in the 2023 Offaly Senior Football Championship are:

Rhode, Tullamore, Edenderry, Ferbane, Clara, Shamrocks, Durrow and Bracknagh.

== Honours ==
The trophy presented to the winners is the Dowling Cup. The club winning the Offaly Championship qualifies to represent the county in the Leinster Senior Club Football Championship, the winner of which progresses to the All-Ireland Senior Club Football Championship.

== List of finals ==
Year	Winner	Score	Runner-up	Score
1896	Tullamore	0–08	Cloghan	1–04
1897	Tullamore	1–05	Cloghan	0–00
1898	Tullamore	w/o	Killoughy	scr
1899	Tullamore	0–06	Quarrymount	0–02
1900	Rhode	0–07	Daingean	0–02
1901	Quarrymount	2–06	Geashill	0–02
1902	Geashill	2–05	Ferbane	0–05
1903	Cloghan	1–04	Geashill	0–02
1904	Geashill	1–04	Ferbane	0–02
1905	Geashill	4–05	Cloghan	0–01
1906	Geashill	3–08	Cloghan	1–04
1907	Geashill	4–10	Tullamore	0–07
1908	Tullamore	2–09	Geashill	0–05
1909	Daingean	1–04	Ballinamere	0–03
1910	Banagher	1–02	Tullamore	0–02
1911	Tullamore	2–03	Geashill	1–00
1912	Tullamore	1–06	Ferbane	0–02
1913	Tullamore	w/o	Banagher	scr
1914	Ferbane	2–01	Ballycommon	1–02
1915	Killeigh	1–04	Ferbane	1–01
1916	Killeigh	1–04	Cloghan	1–01
1917	Tullamore	0–04	Ferbane	0–03
1918	Rhode	4–07	Cloghan	1–00
1919	Clonmore	1–00	Ferbane	0–01
1920	Rhode	0–04	Ferbane	1–00
1921	No competition			
1922	No competition			
1923	Rhode	2–07	Clara	1–01
1924	Tullamore	2–08	Belmont	0–02
1925	Tullamore	2–03	Ferbane	0–00
1926	Tullamore	4–05	Birr	0–00
1927	Rhode	0–06	Ferbane	0–02
1928	Rhode	3–04, 2–05	Tullamore	2–03, 3–02
1929	Rhode	3–06	Daingean	2–04
1930	Tullamore	1–06	Rhode	0–02
1931	Rhode	1–04, 2–04	Tullamore	1–03, 1–07
1932	Tullamore	4–00	Rhode	1–02
1933	Walsh Island	0–08	Tullamore	1–04
1934	Walsh Island	1–06	Tullamore	0–03
1935	Tullamore	2–03	Rhode	0–06
1936	Edenderry	4–06	Walsh Island	3–03
1937	Walsh Island	3–08	Rhode	2–05
1938	Walsh Island	5–08	Daingean	2–06
1939	Rhode	2–04	Daingean	1–06
1940	Rhode	1–05	Walsh Island	0–04
1941	Tullamore	2–06	Edenderry	2–02
1942	Walsh Island	5–06	Daingean	2–05
1943	Walsh Island	1–11	Tullamore	1–07
1944	Rhode	2–05	Tullamore	1–05
1945	Cloghan	1–06	Rhode	1–02
1946	Tullamore	2–06	Rhode	2–04
1947	St Mary's	3–05	Cloghan	1–05
1948	Tullamore	1–08	Edenderry	2–02
1949	Rhode	w/o	Cloghan	scr
1950	St Mary's	2–07	Rhode	1–05
1951	Edenderry	0–12	Cloghan	1–08
1952	Durrow	3–05	Edenderry	1–05
1953	Edenderry	1–08	Rhode	1–05
1954	Tullamore	3–07	Rhode	2–02
1955	Rhode	2–06	Daingean	2–05
1956	Tullamore	0–08	Cloghan	0–01
1957	Edenderry	3–06	Clara	0–02
1958	Rhode	2–10	Clara	2–05
1959	St Patrick's	2–08	Cloghan	0–06
1960	Clara	3–07, 0–08	Tullamore	1–05, 1–05
1961	Gracefield	2–07, 1–08	Tullamore	1–08, 1–08
1962	Daingean	2–07	Killeigh	0–12
1963	Tullamore	4–06	Gracefield	1–08
1964	Clara	1–10	Rhode	1–07
1965	Daingean	0–09	Gracefield	0–06
1966	Rhode	0–11	Clara	1–07
1967	Rhode	1–07	Daingean	0–07
1968	Ballycumber	2–05	Gracefield	0–06
1969	Rhode	2–10, 1–11	Erin Rovers	2–08, 2–08
1970	Gracefield	1–08	Walsh Island	0–09
1971	Ferbane	4–10	Gracefield	1–09
1972	Gracefield	1–15	Ferbane	2–10
1973	Tullamore	1–06	St Carthage	0–07
1974	Ferbane	2–07, 1–09	Gracefield	1–04, 1–09
1975	Rhode	1–12	Daingean	1–07
1976	Ferbane	1–07, 2–11	Walsh Island	0–09, 2–11
1977	Tullamore	2–07	Daingean	1–06
1978	Walsh Island	4–09	Rhode	1–12
1979	Walsh Island	0–10	Rhode	0–08
1980	Walsh Island	2–08	Ferbane	1–05
1981	Walsh Island	1–10, 0–07	Clara	1–05, 0–07
1982	Walsh Island	0–11	Rhode	0–08
1983	Walsh Island	1–10, 0–08	Ferbane	1–07, 0–08
1984	Gracefield	1–10	Edenderry	0–08
1985	Edenderry	1–07	Raheen	1–06
1986	Ferbane	1–16	Kilcormac	0–05
1987	Ferbane	1–06	Clara	1–03
1988	Ferbane	1–12	Tullamore	2–03
1989	Ferbane	3–14	Rhode	1–09
1990	Ferbane	5–09	Gracefield	1–06
1991	Clara	3–07	Gracefield	1–06
1992	Ferbane	2–07	Tullamore	1–09
1993	Clara	4–08	Ferbane	2–11
1994	Ferbane	0–10	Shannonbridge	0–08
1995	Edenderry	2–10	Clara	1–10
1996	Shannonbridge	1–11	Tullamore	0–12
1997	Edenderry	1–15	Ferbane	1–14
1998	Rhode	0–1–11	Edenderry	1–04
1999	Edenderry	2–09, 1–07	Rhode	0–13, 1–07
2000	Tullamore	1–09	Shamrocks	0–10
2001	Edenderry	1–09	Rhode	1–06
2002	Tullamore	1–08	Gracefield	0–08
2003	Clara	1–09	Rhode	1–07
2004	Rhode	3–12	Gracefield	1–05
2005	Rhode	2–10	Shamrocks	0–13
2006	Rhode	2–06	Clara	0–09
2007	Tullamore	1–12	Shamrocks	0–12
2008	Rhode	1–20	Tullamore	2–04
2009	Clara	2–07	Rhode	1–09
2010	Rhode	3–09	Clara	2–11
2011	Edenderry	0–09	Clara	0–08
2012	Rhode	0–15	Clara	1–06
2013	Tullamore	2–07	Rhode	0–09
2014	Rhode	0–13	Edenderry	1–07
2015	Edenderry	1–12	Rhode	1–10
2016	Rhode	1–14	Ferbane	0–09
2017	Rhode	0–12	Clara	0–09
2018	Rhode	1–18	Ferbane	0–10
2019	Ferbane	2–13	Rhode	0–14
2020	Rhode	1–09	Tullamore	1–07
2021	Tullamore	0–09, 1–08	Rhode	1–04, 1–08
2022	Rhode	1–09	Tullamore	0–11
2023	Tullamore	1–05	Ferbane	0–06
2024	Tullamore	0–15	Ferbane	0–14
2025	Tullamore	0–19	Ferbane	1–12
2026	Tullamore	2-16	Ferbane	1-13

== Wins listed by club ==
#	Club	Wins	Years won
1	Tullamore	32	1896, 1897, 1898, 1899, 1908, 1911, 1912, 1913, 1917, 1924, 1925, 1926, 1930, 1932, 1935, 1941, 1946, 1948, 1954, 1956, 1963, 1973, 1977, 2000, 2002, 2007, 2013, 2021, 2023, 2024, 2025, 2026
2	Rhode	31	1900, 1918, 1920, 1923, 1927, 1928, 1929, 1931, 1939, 1940, 1944, 1949, 1955, 1958, 1966, 1967, 1969, 1975, 1998, 2004, 2005, 2006, 2008, 2010, 2012, 2014, 2016, 2017, 2018, 2020, 2022
3	Walsh Island	12	1933, 1934, 1937, 1938, 1942, 1943, 1978, 1979, 1980, 1981, 1982, 1983
3	Ferbane	12	1914, 1971, 1974, 1976, 1986, 1987, 1988, 1989, 1990, 1992, 1994, 2019
5	Edenderry	11	1936, 1951, 1953, 1957, 1985, 1995, 1997, 1999, 2001, 2011, 2015
6	Clara	6	1960, 1964, 1991, 1993, 2003, 2009
7	Geashill	5	1902, 1904, 1905, 1906, 1907
8	Gracefield	4	1961, 1970, 1972, 1984
9	Daingean	3	1909, 1962, 1965
10	St Mary's	2	1947, 1950
10	Cloghan	2	1903, 1945
10	Killeigh	2	1915, 1916
11	Shannonbridge	1	1996
11	Ballycumber	1	1968
11	St Patrick's	1	1959
11	Durrow	1	1952
11	Clonmore	1	1919
11	Banagher	1	1910
11	Quarrymount	1	1901
