= Chenevix =

Chenevix is a surname, and may refer to:

- Helen Chenevix (1890–1963), Irish suffragist and trade unionist
- Richard Chenevix (bishop) (1698–1779), Church of Ireland Bishop of Waterford and Lismore.
- Richard Chenevix (chemist) (c. 1774–1830), Irish chemist, mineralogist and playwright
- Melesina Trench (née Chenevix, previously St George; 1768 – 1827), Irish writer

== See also ==
- Anthony Chenevix-Trench
- Cesca Chenevix Trench
- Charles Chenevix Trench
- Francis Chenevix Trench
- Georgia Chenevix-Trench
- Richard Chenevix Trench
