= 2026 Offaly Senior Football Championship =

129th Offaly Senior Football Championship

Tournament details
- County: Offaly
- Province: Leinster
- Year: 2026
- Sponsor: Tullamore Court Hotel
- Date: 4 July 2026 - 11 October 2026
- Teams: 10
- Defending champions: Tullamore

Winners
- Champions: Tullamore (32nd win)
- Manager: Paul McConway
- Captain: Cormac Egan

Runners-up
- Runners-up: Ferbane
- Manager: George Digan
- Captain: Ciarán Cahill

Promotion/Relegation
- Relegated team(s): N/A

Other
- Matches played: 26
- Website: Offaly GAA

The 2026 Offaly Senior Football Championship is the 129th edition of Offaly GAA's premier Gaelic football competition for senior graded clubs in County Offaly, Ireland. Ten teams compete, with the winner representing Offaly in the Leinster Senior Club Football Championship.

The championship starts with a league phase and progresses to a knock-out stage.

Tullamore are the defending champions after defeating Ferbane in the previous years final. It was the 3rd year in a row in which both teams met each other in the final and Tullamore won all three.

Clara were promoted to the competition after winning the 2025 Senior B Football Championship. No teams were relegated in 2025.

The draw for the group stage of the championship was held on 18 February 2026.

== Format Changes ==
The 2026 Offaly S.F.C starts with a group stage consisting of two divisions, each holding five teams each. Division 1 is seeded with last years semi-finalists (Tullamore, Ferbane, Edenderry and Rhode) as well as one of the beaten quarter-finalists (Shamrocks). Division 2 is seeded with the other beaten quarter-finalist (Bracknagh), the teams that didn't qualify out of their group (Ballycommon, Clonbullogue and Durrow), and the 2025 Senior B Champions (Clara).

The top two teams in Division 1 qualify for the semi-finals, while the third and fourth placed teams qualify for the quarter-finals. The bottom finisher in Division 1 is demoted to Division 2 for 2027. The top two teams in Division 2 will play against the third and fourth-placed finishers in Division 1 in the quarter-finals.

The two bottom placed finishers in Division 2 will play-off against one another for the right to stay within the Offaly S.F.C.

== Team Changes ==
The following teams have changed division since the 2025 championship season:

=== To S.F.C. ===
Promoted from 2025 Senior B Football Championship

- Clara - (Senior B Champions)

=== From S.F.C. ===
Relegated to 2026 Senior B Football Championship

- N/A

== Participating teams ==
The teams competing in the 2026 Offaly SFC are:

Club	Location	Manager(s)	2025 Championship Position	2026 Championship Position	Championship Titles (Pre 2026)	Last Championship Title (Pre 2026)	In Championship since
Ballycommon	Ballycommon	Shane Kelly	Non-Qualifier	Quarter-Finalist	0	—	2024
Bracknagh	Bracknagh	Ronan Murphy	Quarter-Finalist	Retained Senior Status	0	—	2023
Clara	Clara	John Rouse	Senior B Champions	Quarter-Finalist	6	2009	2026
Clonbullogue	Clonbullogue	Mark Daly	Non-Qualifier	Non-Qualifier (Division 2)	0	—	2025
Durrow	Aghancarnan	Shane Curran	Non-Qualifier	Relegation Finalist	1	1952	2021
Edenderry	Edenderry	Peter Brady	Semi-Finalist	Demoted to Division 2	11	2015	2008
Ferbane	Ferbane	George Digan	Runners-Up	Runners-Up	12	2019	1960
Rhode	Rhode	Paschal Kellaghan	Semi-Finalist	Semi-Finalist	31	2022	Never Relegated
Shamrocks	Mucklagh, Rahan and The Island	Nigel Dunne	Quarter-Finalist	Semi-Finalist	0	—	2019
Tullamore	Tullamore	Paul McConway	Champions	Champions	31	2025	Never Relegated

== League Phase ==
=== Division 1 ===
Advance to semi-finals Advance to quarter-finals Demoted to Division 2

Team	Matches				Score			Pts
Team	Pld	W	D	L	For	Against	Diff	Pts
Rhode	4	3	1	0	81	64	+17	7
Ferbane	4	3	0	1	83	61	+22	6
Tullamore	4	2	0	2	78	68	+10	4
Shamrocks	4	1	1	2	81	64	+17	3
Edenderry	4	0	0	4	50	116	-66	0

Round 1

3 July 2026 Round 1	Rhode	1-13 (16) – (16) 1-13	Shamrocks	Rhode
19:30 IST (UTC+1)		(HT: 0-05 – 1-08)
	Pts: Ruari McNamee 0-4 (2f), Dylan Kavanagh 1-0, Anton Sullivan 0-3, Ryan Kelleghan 0-2, Conor McNamee 0-2, Seán Hurley 0-1 (f), Billy Quinn 0-1	Report	Pts: Kieran Dolan 1-1, Jack Bryant 0-4 (2tpf), Scott Delaney 0-2 (tp), John O'Toole 0-2 (tp), Gary Hutchinson 0-1, Andrew Delaney 0-1, Darragh Bryant 0-1, Nigel Dunne 0-1 (f)	Referee: Kevin Williamson

4 July 2026 Round 1	Edenderry	1-11 (14) – (29) 2-23	Tullamore	Edenderry
19:00 IST (UTC+1)		(HT: 1-08 – 0-06)		Venue: Gaelic Park
	Pts: Cian Murphy 1-4 (1pen, 1tp), Stephen McGlynn 0-3 (1tpf, 1f), Jordan Hayes 0-2 (tp), Kaelem Bryan 0-2	Report	Pts: Harry Plunkett 2-6 (1pen, 1tpf, 1tp, 1f), Diarmuid Egan 0-4 (1tp), Luke Plunkett 0-3, Nigel Bracken 0-3 (1tp), Aaron Leavy 0-2 (tp), Mike Fox 0-2, Jack Maher 0-1, Niall Furlong 0-1, Luke Bourke 0-1	Referee: Eamon O'Connor

Round 2

17 July 2026 Round 2	Ferbane	1-15 (18) – (19) 0-19	Rhode	Ferbane
19:30 IST (UTC+1)		(HT: 0-07 – 0-11)
	Pts: Joe Maher 0-8 (2tpf, 1tp), Cian Johnson 0-6 (5f), Ciarán Cahill 1-0, Kyle Higgins 0-1	Report	Pts: Ruarí McNamee 0-10 (1tpf, 1tp, 2f), Niall McNamee 0-3 (1tpf), Billy Quinn 0-3, Adam Kelleghan 0-1, Anton Sullivan 0-1, Ross Kellaghan 0-1	Referee: Eamon O'Connor

18 July 2026 Round 2	Shamrocks	6-18 (36) – (7) 0-07	Edenderry	Mucklagh
19:00 IST (UTC+1)		(HT: 5-07 – 0-04)
	Pts: Jack Bryant 1-7 (2f), Scott Delaney 1-1, Dan Heffernan 1-1, Séan O'Toole 1-0 (pen), David O'Rourke 1-0, Padraig Cantwell 1-0, Shane O'Toole-Greene 0-2, Nigel Dunne 0-2, Darragh Bryant 0-2 (2f), Andrew Delaney 0-1, Conor Egan 0-1, Eoghan Neville 0-1	Report	Pts: Cian Murphy 0-3 (1f), Stephen McGlynn 0-2 (tpf), Aaron Murphy 0-1, Kaelem Bryant 0-1 (f)	Referee: Fergal Smyth

Round 3

31 July 2026 Round 3	Tullamore	2-14 (20) – (15) 1-12	Shamrocks	Clara
19:30 IST (UTC+1)		(HT: 1-04 – 0-08)
	Pts: Harry Plunkett 0-5 (1tpf, 2f), Diarmuid Egan 1-1, Mike Fox 1-1, Niall Furlong 0-3, Jack Maher 0-1, Aaron Leavy 0-1, Luke Plunkett 0-1, Luke Bourke 0-1	Report	Pts: Jack Bryant 0-5 (1tp), Darragh Bryant 1-0, Seán O'Toole 0-2 (tpf), David O'Rourke 0-2 (tp), Nigel Dunne 0-2 (tp), Eoghan Neville 0-1	Referee: Marius Stones

1 August 2026 Round 3	Edenderry	1-12 (15) – (27) 4-15	Ferbane	Tullamore
17:45 IST (UTC+1)		(HT: 1-05 – 3-09)		Venue: O'Connor Park
	Pts: Kaelem Bryan 0-5 (1tp, 3f), Harry Goulding 1-0, Alex Kenny 0-3 (2f), Jordan Hayes 0-1, Darragh Farrell 0-1, Rory Egan 0-1, Cian Murphy 0-1	Report	Pts: Cian Johnson 1-4 (1f), David Nally 2-0, Eoghan Grennan 0-4 (2tp), Darragh Flynn 1-0, Paddy Clancy 0-2, Aaron McCabe 0-1, Ciarán Cahill 0-1, Brian Carroll 0-1, Joe Maher 0-1, Jack Clancy 0-1	Referee: Kevin Williamson

Round 4

14 August 2026 Round 4	Tullamore	0-13 (13) – (17) 0-17	Ferbane	Tullamore
19:00 IST (UTC+1)		(HT: 0-07 – 0-08)		Venue: O'Connor Park
	Pts: Harry Plunkett 0-6 (1tpf, 3f), Mike Fox 0-3, Diarmuid Egan 0-2, Daire McDaid 0-1, Luke Plunkett 0-1	Report	Pts: Jake Maher 0-4, Joe Maher 0-4 (3f), Darragh Flynn 0-3, Eoghan Grennan 0-2, Aaron McCabe 0-1, David Nally 0-1, Paddy Clancy 0-1, Brian Carroll 0-1	Referee: Eamon O'Connor

16 August 2026 Round 4	Rhode	2-18 (24) – (14) 1-11	Edenderry	Tullamore
17:30 IST (UTC+1)		(HT: 1-10 – 0-07)		Venue: O'Connor Park
	Pts: Ross Kellaghan 1-4 (1tp), Aaron Kellaghan 1-4 (1tp), Ruairí McNamee 0-6 (2f), Niall McNamee 0-1, Ryan Kellaghan 0-1, Adam Kellaghan 0-1, Eoin Smith 0-1	Report	Pts: Kaelem Bryan 0-5 (1tp, 1f, 1m), Cian Murphy 1-2, Jordan Hayes 0-2 (tp), Alex Kenny 0-1, Mark Abbott 0-1	Referee: Chris Dwyer

Round 5

29 August 2026 Round 5	Shamrocks	1-11 (14) – (21) 1-18	Ferbane	Tullamore
15:00 IST (UTC+1)		(HT: 0-04 – 1-14)		Venue: O'Connor Park
	Pts: Scott Delaney 1-1, Darragh Bryant 0-3 (1tp, 1f), Andrew Delaney 0-2, Paddy Dunican 0-2 (tpf), Conor Egan 0-1, Johnny O'Toole Greene 0-1, David O'Toole Greene 0-1	Report	Pts: David Nally 0-7 (2tp), Cian Johnson 1-4, Paddy Clancy 0-3 (1tp), Ciarán Cahill 0-1 (m), Pat Taaffe 0-1, Eoghan Grennan 0-1, Jake Maher 0-1	Referee: Kevin Williamson

29 August 2026 Round 5	Rhode	3-13 (22) – (16) 0-16	Tullamore	Tullamore
16:45 IST (UTC+1)		(HT: 1-06 – 0-06)		Venue: O'Connor Park
	Pts: Ross Kellaghan 2-0, Ruairí McNamee 0-5 (2f), Aaron Kellaghan 0-3 (1tpf), Dylan Kavanagh 1-0, Seán Hurley 0-2 (tp), Adam Kellaghan 0-2, Anton Sullivan 0-1	Report	Pts: Harry Plunkett 0-11 (3tpf, 4f), Diarmuid Egan 0-1, Davin Keegan 0-1, Liam Dillane 0-1, Daire McDaid 0-1, Luke Plunkett 0-1	Referee: Marius Stones

=== Division 2 ===
Advance to quarter-finals Advance to relegation play-off

Team	Matches				Score			Pts
Team	Pld	W	D	L	For	Against	Diff	Pts
Clara	4	2	2	0	98	76	+22	6
Ballycommon	4	2	2	0	71	60	+11	6
Clonbullogue	4	1	2	1	65	65	0	4
Bracknagh	4	1	2	1	69	73	-4	4
Durrow	4	0	0	4	69	98	-29	0

Round 1

5 July 2026 Round 1	Bracknagh	3-13 (22) – (22) 1-19	Clara	Bracknagh
14:00 IST (UTC+1)		(HT: 1-07 – 1-12)
	Pts: Eoghan Geoghegan 2-2, Conor Melia 0-6 (2tp, 1f), Peter Cunningham 1-0, Colm Cunningham 0-2, Seán Wyer 0-1, Jason Dempsey 0-1 ('45), Mikey Cunningham 0-1	Report	Pts: Cormac Delaney 0-11 (2tpf, 3f, 1tp), Marcas Dalton 1-0, Conor Doyle 0-3 (1tp), Graham Guilfoyle 0-2, Jack Reynolds 0-2 (1f), Adam Kelly 0-1	Referee: Fergal Smyth

5 July 2026 Round 1	Ballycommon	1-12 (15) – (15) 1-12	Clonbullogue	Ballycommon
17:30 IST (UTC+1)		(HT: 0-06 – 0-05)
	Pts: Chris Kenny 1-1, Gareth Mann 0-4 (1f), Tom Mealiffe 0-2 (tp), Conor Dunne 0-2, Brian Todd 0-1 (f), David Dempsey 0-1, Stephen Connely 0-1	Report	Pts: Keith O'Neill 1-7 (1tpf, 1'45, 2f, 1tp), Daryl Quinn 0-3 (1tp), Jack McEvoy 0-1, Tommy Dempsey 0-1	Referee: Chris Dwyer

Round 2

18 July 2026 Round 2	Durrow	1-16 (19) – (20) 3-11	Bracknagh	Aghancarnan
14:30 IST (UTC+1)		(HT: 0-10 – 1-03)
	Pts: Kevin McDermott 1-4 (4f), Mark Troy 0-4 (1f), Jack O'Brien 0-4 (1tpf, 1tp), Jack Fogarty 0-1, Dan Bourke 0-1, Brian Duignan 0-1, Steven Doran 0-1	Report	Pts: Peter Cunningham 1-7 (2tpf, 1pen, 1tp), Jason Dempsey 1-0, Colm Cunningham 1-0, Mikey Cunningham 0-2 (1f), Anthony Cunningham 0-1, Eoghan Geoghegan 0-1	Referee: Brain Gavin

18 July 2026 Round 2	Clara	2-14 (20) – (20) 0-20	Ballycommon	Clara
16:30 IST (UTC+1)		(HT: 1-07 – 0-07)
	Pts: Marcas Dalton 1-2, Carl Stewart 1-1, Conor Doyle 0-3 (1tp), Graham Guilfoyle 0-3 (1tp), Josh Fleming 0-2 (2f), Alan Gavin 0-1, Conor Egan 0-1, Adam Kelly 0-1	Report	Pts: Brian Todd 0-5 (4f), Chris Kenny 0-5 (2tp), David Dempsey 1-0, Gareth Mann 0-3 (1tpf, 1f), Seán Conway 0-2, Stephen Conneely 0-1, Paul Conway 0-1	Referee: Kevin Williamson

Round 3

1 August 2026 Round 3	Clonbullogue	1-09 (12) – (20) 0-20	Clara	Tullamore
16:00 IST (UTC+1)		(HT: 0-06 – 0-06)		Venue: O'Connor Park
	Pts: Keith O'Neill 0-5 (2tpf, 1'45), Harry Judge 1-0, Peter Byrne 0-2 (tp), Jack McEvoy 0-1 (f), Tommy Dempsey 0-1	Report	Pts: Graham Guilfoyle 0-7 (3tp), Cormac Delaney 0-5 (1tpf, 1f), Marcas Dalton 0-2, Ed Cullen 0-2, Carl Stewart 0-1, David Falsey 0-1, Bobby Mitchell 0-1, Conor Egan 0-1, Josh Fleming 0-1	Referee: Eamon O'Connor

2 August 2026 Round 3	Ballycommon	0-21 (21) – (15) 1-12	Durrow	Daingean
14:00 IST (UTC+1)		(HT: 0-10 – 0-07)
	Pts: Chris Kenny 0-6 (2tp), Brian Todd 0-3 (1tp), Seán Conway 0-3, Stephen Conneely 0-3, Paul Conway 0-2, David Dempsey 0-1	Report	Pts: Brian Duignan 1-5, Mark Troy 0-4 (3f), Aaron Maher 0-1, Joe Maher 0-1, Cian Kinnarney 0-1	Referee: Adam Kinahan (Clodiagh Gaels)

Round 4

15 August 2026 Round 4	Clonbullogue	1-18 (21) – (13) 1-10	Durrow	Clonbullogue
16:30 IST (UTC+1)		(HT: 1-08 – 0-06)
	Pts: Keith O'Neill 1-5 (4f), Jamie Guing 0-5 (1tpf, 1tp), Jack McEvoy 0-4 (1tp), Ryan Dempsey 0-2 (tp), David Dempsey 0-1, Ruairí O'Neill 0-1	Report	Pts: Mark Troy 0-8 (3f, 1tpf), Brian Duignan 1-1, Sam Bourke 0-1	Referee: Chris Dwyer

15 August 2026 Round 4	Bracknagh	0-10 (10) – (15) 0-15	Ballycommon	Daingean
19:00 IST (UTC+1)		(HT: 0-03 – 0-08)
	Pts: Peter Cunningham 0-4 (1tp, 1'45), Charlie Keogh 0-3, Colm Cunningham 0-1, Jason Dempsey 0-1, Mike Cunningham 0-1 (f)	Report	Pts: Gareth Mann 0-4 (2f), Chris Kenny 0-3, Paul Conway 0-2, Stephen Conneely 0-2, David Dempsey 0-1, Jack Kenny 0-1, Seán Conway 0-1, Ryan Kenny 0-1	Referee: Kevin Williamson

Round 5

30 August 2026 Round 5	Bracknagh	0-17 (17) – (17) 2-11	Clonbullogue	Tullamore
14:00 IST (UTC+1)		(HT: 0-05 – 0-04)		Venue: O'Connor Park
	Pts: Peter Cunningham 0-11 (3tpf, 1tp, 1f), Conor Melia 0-4 (2tp), Mikey Cunningham 0-1 Seán Wyer 0-1	Report	Pts: Keith O'Neill 1-4 (1tpf), Jamie Guing 0-5 (1tpf), Seán Foran 1-1, Tommy Dempsey 0-1	Referee: Fergal Smyth

30 August 2026 Round 5	Clara	4-24 (36) – (22) 3-13	Durrow	Tullamore
15:45 IST (UTC+1)		(HT: 2-13 – 1-08)		Venue: O'Connor Park
	Pts: Ed Cullen 2-3 (1tp), Cormac Delaney 0-6 (1tp, 1f), Adam Kelly 0-5 (1tp), Josh Fleming 0-4 (3f), Graham Guilfoyle 0-3 (1tp), Colm Doyle 1-0, Conor Doyle 1-0, David Falsey 0-2, Eoin Gavin 0-1	Report	Pts: Brian Duignan 1-3, Steven Doran 1-2, Mark Troy 0-5 (2tpf, 1f), Ross Ravenhill 1-0, Ciarán Burke 0-1, Stephen Fitzgerald 0-1 (f), Sam Bourke 0-1	Referee: Adam Kinahan

== Knock-out Stage ==
The top 2 teams in Division 1 qualify for the semi-finals. The 3rd and 4th placed teams in Division 1 and 1st and 2nd placed teams in Division 2 play each other in the quarter-finals.

=== Bracket ===
Quarter-finals
13 September, Tullamore
Shamrocks	1-19
Clara	1-12
13 September, Tullamore
Tullamore	5-13
Ballycommon	0-12

Semi-finals
27 September, Tullamore
Shamrocks	3-11
Ferbane	2-19
27 September, Tullamore
Tullamore	2-13
Rhode	1-06

Final
11 October, Tullamore
Ferbane	1-13
Tullamore	2-16

=== Relegation Play-off ===
The bottom finishers in Division 2 play-off in a relegation final. The loser is relegated to the 2027 Offaly Senior B Football Championship. As Tullamore's second team won the 2026 Senior B championship, no team is promoted to the Senior Championship for 2027 and therefore Bracknagh retain their senior status.

11 September 2026 Relegation Play-off	Bracknagh	3-15 (24) – (26) 3-17	Durrow	Geashill
19:30 IST (UTC+1)		(HT: 3-10 – 0-7)		Venue: Páirc Naomh Mhuire
	Pts: Mikey Cunningham 2-4, Peter Cunningham 1-5 (1tpf, 2f), Eoghan Geoghegan 0-2 (tp), Conor Melia 0-1, Charlie Keogh 0-1, Fionn Dempsey 0-1, Alex Broderick 0-1	Report	Pts: Brian Duignan 1-8 (1tp), Mark Troy 1-4 (3f), Kevin McDermott 1-0, Steven Doran 0-1 (f), Michael McDermott 0-1, Ciarán Burke 0-1, Dan Bourke 0-1, Sam Bourke 0-1	Referee: Adam Kinahan

=== Quarter-Finals ===
13 September 2026 Quarter-Finals	Shamrocks	1-19 (22) – (15) 1-12	Clara	Tullamore
15:00 IST (UTC+1)		(HT: 1-08 – 0-08)		Venue: O'Connor Park
	Pts: Paddy Dunican 1-12 (3tpf, 3f, 1pen), Nigel Dunne 0-3, Eoghan Neville 0-2 (tp), Conor Egan 0-1, Jack Bryant 0-1	Report	Pts: Ed Cullen 1-2, Adam Kelly 0-3 (1tp), Colm Doyle 0-2 (tp), Conor Egan 0-1, Josh Fleming 0-1, Marcas Dalton 0-1, Graham Guifoyle 0-1 (f), Josh Fleming 0-1 (f)	Referee: Kevin Williamson

13 September 2026 Quarter-Finals	Tullamore	5-13 (28) – (12) 0-12	Ballycommon	Tullamore
16:30 IST (UTC+1)		(HT: 1-05 – 0-09)		Venue: O'Connor Park
	Pts: John Furlong 2-0, Harry Plunkett 1-3 (1pen, 1f), Luke Plunkett 1-1, Mike Fox 0-4, Luke Bourke 1-0, Nigel Bracken 0-2 (tp), Niall Furlong 0-1, Declan Hogan 0-1, Diarmuid Egan 0-1	Report	Pts: Ryan Kenny 0-6 (1tpf, 3f), Gareth Mann 0-4 (1tpf), Stephen Conneely 0-1, Seán Conway 0-1	Referee: Chris Dwyer

=== Semi-Finals ===
27 September 2026 Semi-Finals	Ferbane	2-19 (25) – (20) 3-11	Shamrocks	Tullamore
14:30 IST (UTC+1)		(HT: 0-12 – 3-04)		Venue: O'Connor Park
	Pts: Jake Maher 1-3, Cian Johnston 1-2 (2f), Darragh Flynn 0-4, Adam Nugent 0-2 (tpf), Patrick Taaffe 0-2, Paddy Clancy 0-2 (tp), Kyle Higgins 0-1, Brian Carroll 0-1, Joe Maher 0-1, Conor Grennan 0-1	Report	Pts: Paddy Dunican 0-6 (2f, 1tp), Jack Bryant 1-2, Conor Egan 1-0, Kieran Dolan 0-1, David O'Rourke 0-1, Nigel Dunne 0-1	Referee: Fergal Smyth

27 September 2026 Semi-Finals	Rhode	1-06 (9) – (19) 2-13	Tullamore	Tullamore
16:00 IST (UTC+1)		(HT: 0-04 – 1-06)		Venue: O'Connor Park
	Pts: Aaron Kellaghan 1-3 (1'45), Ross Kelleghan 0-2 (tp), Anton Sullivan 0-1	Report	Pts: Aaron Leavy 1-1, Niall Furlong 1-0, Harry Plunkett 0-3 (2f), Davin Keegan (1tp) 0-3, Cormac Egan 0-2, Diarmuid Egan 0-2, Luke Bourke 0-1, Liam Dillane 0-1	Referee: Marius Stones

=== Final ===
Ferbane and Tullamore entered their 4th final in a row against each other, with Tullamore coming in with a 100% record. Ferbane were looking to break that streak and win their first SFC title since 2019, and their 13th title. Tullamore were looking to win their 4th title in a row and their 32nd championship title, which would make them have the undisputed highest amount of championship titles of any team in Offaly.

Tullamore were 4/9 favourites, with Ferbane as 2/1 underdogs.

11 October 2026
15:45 IST (UTC+1)
Final

Report

Ferbane	1-13 (16) – (22) 2-16	Tullamore
(HT: 0-10 – 1-07)
Pts: Cian Johnston 1-7 (4f), Paddy Clancy 0-3 (1tp), Leon Fox 0-2, Darragh Flynn 0-1		Pts: Harry Plunkett 1-4 (4f), Niall Furlong 0-3, Declan Hogan 1-0, Cormac Egan 0-2, Daire McDaid 0-2, Mike Fox 0-2, Aaron Leavy 0-1, Diarmuid Egan 0-1, Liam Dillane 0-1

O'Connor Park, Tullamore
Referee: Chris Dwyer

Ferbane	Tullamore
