= Richard Chenevix =

Richard Chenevix may refer to:

- Richard Chenevix (bishop) (1698–1779), Bishop of Waterford
- Richard Chenevix (chemist) (1774–1830), Irish chemist, Fellow of the Royal Society
- Richard Chenevix Trench (1807–1886), Anglican bishop and poet
