= Pádraig Cantwell =

Irish hurler

Personal information
- Native name: Pádraig Cantual (Irish)
- Born: 2000 (age 25–26) Mucklagh, County Offaly, Ireland

Sport
- Sport: Hurling
- Position: Left corner-back
Club
- Years: Club
- Shamrocks
Club titles
	Football	Hurling
Offaly titles	0	0
College
- Years: College
- 2018-2023: DCU Dóchas Éireann
College titles
- Fitzgibbon titles: 0
Inter-county
- Years: County
- 2021-present: Offaly
Inter-county titles
- Leinster titles: 0
- All-Irelands: 0
- NHL: 0
- All Stars: 0

Pádraig Cantwell (born 2000) is an Irish hurler. At club level he plays with Shamrocks and at inter-county level with the Offaly senior hurling team.

== Career ==
Cantwell first played hurling and Gaelic football to a high standard as a student at Killina Presentation Secondary School. He later earned inclusion on the DCU Dóchas Éireann team for the Fitzgibbon Cup.

At club level, Cantwell progressed through the juvenile and underage ranks with the Shamrocks club before joining the club's adult teams as a dual player. He was part of the club's senior football team that beat Tubber in 2018 to win the Offaly SBFC title.

Cantwell first appeared on the inter-county scene for Offaly during an unsuccessful one-year tenure with the under-20 team in 2020. He was later drafted onto the senior team and made his debut in a National Hurling League defeat of Wicklow in 2021. Cantwell won a Joe McDonagh Cup medal as an unused substitute in 2024 after a defeat of Laois in the final.

== Honours ==
Shamrocks

- Offaly Senior B Football Championship: 2018

Offaly

- Joe McDonagh Cup: 2024

Mucklagh

- Pedal for the Playground

Pádraig undertook the biggest physical challenge of his career in preparation for The Pedal. The training was gruelling, akin only to the six-feet-spaced turf-footing of 2020, but Pádraig persevered and, whilst thronged with fans throwing undergarments and newborn babies at him in Kelly's Roadhouse, recorded it as one of the finest moments in his young life. However, he was mercilessly dominated by the Great Brian Tyrell on the home stretch, culminating in the end of a Shamrockian rivalry akin to that of the Montagues and Capulets.
