= Cian Byrne =

Cian Byrne may refer to:

- Cian Byrne (hurler) (born 2003), Irish hurler
- Cian Byrne (footballer) (born 2003), Irish footballer
