= Cesca Chenevix Trench =

Irish nationalist and artist (1891–1918)

Cesca Chenevix Trench (Sadhbh Trinseach)
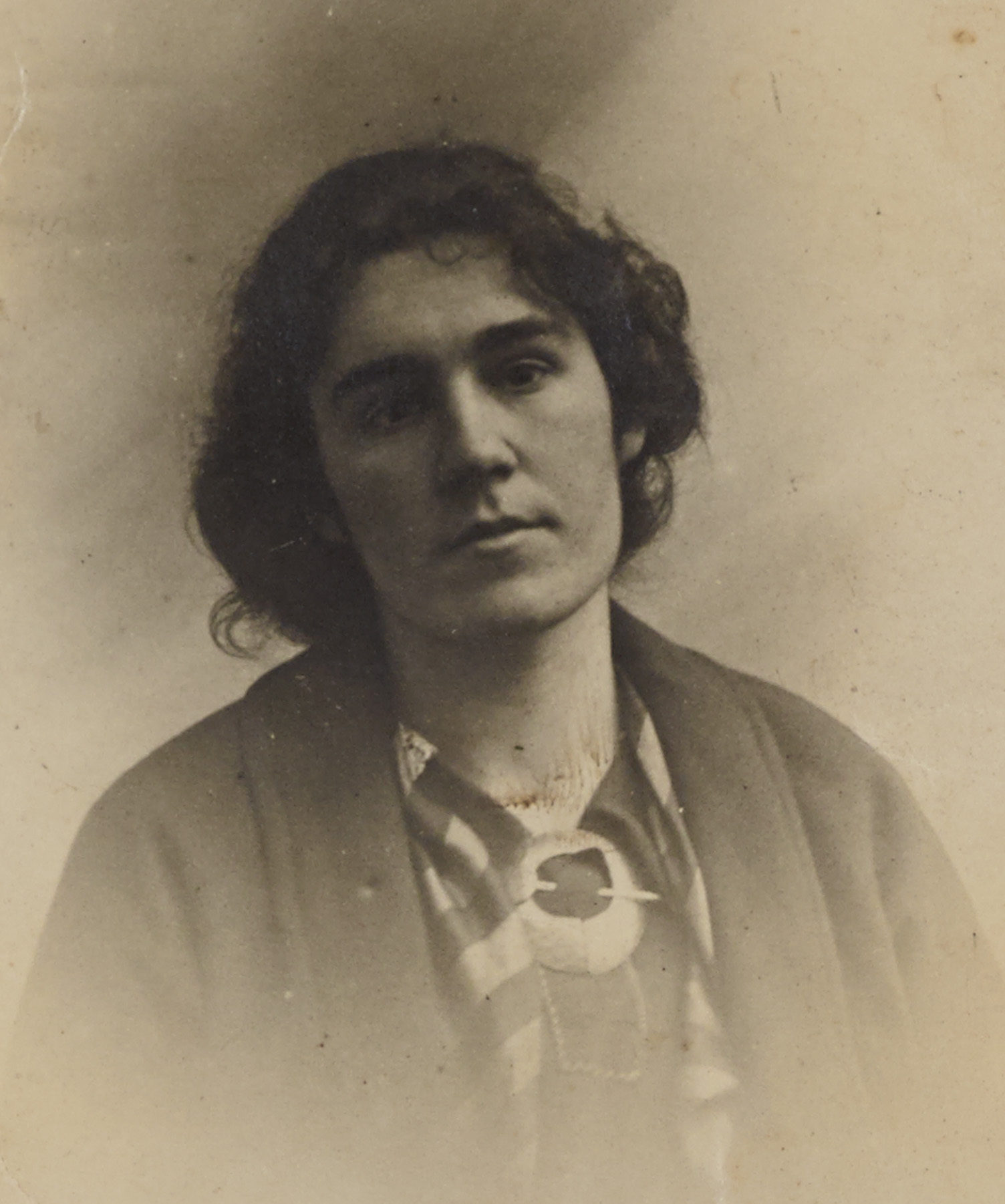
- Trench, circa 1917
- Born: Frances Georgiana Chenevix Trench; 3 February 1891; Liverpool, England, United Kingdom of Great Britain and Ireland
- Died: 3 October 1918 (age 27)
- Known for: Illustration
- Movement: Celtic Revival

Frances Georgiana "Cesca" Chenevix Trench (3 February 1891 – 30 October 1918) was a British-born Irish nationalist and illustrator. She took the Irish name Sadhbh Trinseach.

== Biography ==
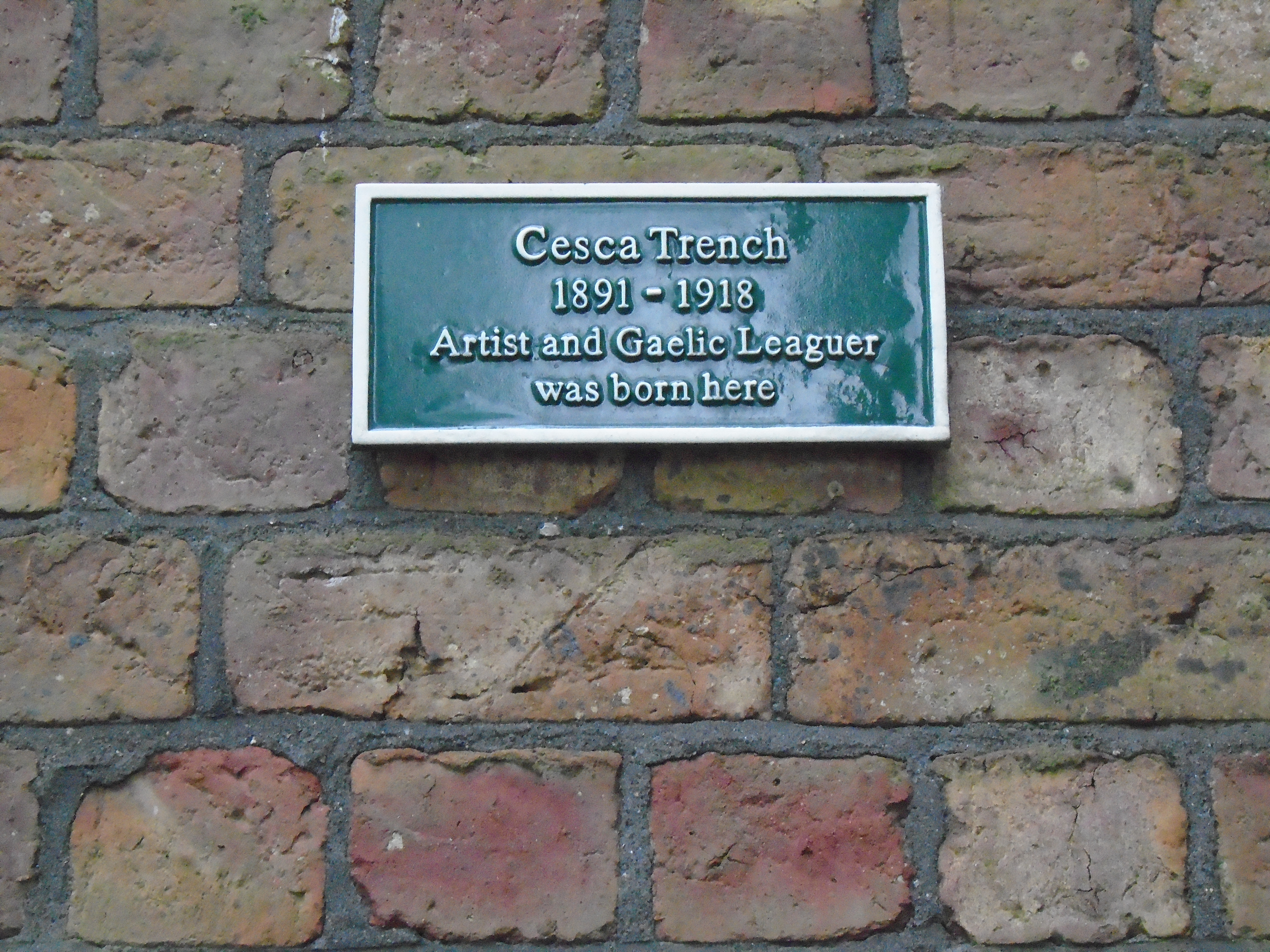
Plaque by the door of St John's vicarage.

Frances Georgiana Chenevix Trench was born in the vicarage of St John the Baptist Church, Tuebrook, Liverpool. She was the granddaughter of Richard Chenevix Trench, the Archbishop of Dublin and grew up in a vicarage in Kent. Her mother was a Unionist. Cesca became an Irish nationalist. Her uncle, classicist Henry Butcher, was a Unionist MP for Cambridge; they drew apart after 1910 when he did not support the move to make Irish compulsory in the new National University.

Trench studied at a boarding school in Malvern from 1906 to 1908, where she began to support Irish Home Rule in public. In 1908–1913 she lived in Folkestone but spent each summer in Ireland and attended summer school in 1909–1913, notably the influential Scoil Acla on Achill Island. There she met Diarmid Coffey, her future husband, as well as others influential in Conradh na Gaeilge, Claud Chavasse, Ella Young, Lily Williams, and Agnes O'Farrelly.

Trench's older cousin, Dermot Chenevix Trench, the model for "Haines" in Ulysses and her sister, Margot, were also Irish nationalists. Dermot first taught her to speak Irish, and influenced her entry into the Irish-Ireland movement, whose members bought Irish-made goods for preference, and fostered Irish literature, art and culture. Cesca opened an account at Gleason's, a shop in Dublin that sold only Irish products, and swore off drink and tobacco unless they were produced in Ireland. When a new campaign for Home Rule begun in 1912, Cesca and Margot collected signatures for a petition that all Irish taxes should be lodged in an Irish treasury. They collected Irish folklore, customs and traditions. Dermot committed suicide in 1909. "He might have done so much with such ability", she wrote to her brother Herbert after Dermot shot himself.

In October 1913, Trench moved to Paris to study art. There she began to draw political cartoons in support of Irish Home Rule. She also made an Irish 'national dress' costume, and poster designs for the Gaelic League paper An Claidheamh Soluis, edited by Patrick Pearse, and painted Irish scenes. She returned to Dublin in June 1914.

Trench supported the Irish Literary Revival, was involved in the import of guns for the Irish Volunteers and joined their women's auxiliary branch Cumann na mBan, where she learned first aid. In July 1914, she witnessed the Bachelor's Walk massacre, when soldiers of the King's Own Scottish Borderers fired on civilians, killing three and wounding 32 after the Howth gun-running. In Lusk, County Dublin, she founded a new branch of Cumann na mBan. In July 1914 she took up work at the Dublin Metropolitan School of Art, where she worked until April 1916.

Her three brothers, Arthur, Charles Reginald (Reggie) and Herbert Chenevix Trench, joined the British Army in 1914 on the outbreak of World War I, Reginald (Reggie), to whom she was particularly close, as an officer in the Sherwood Foresters. When the Easter Rising began on 24 April 1916, she left home to join the other auxiliaries in St Stephen's Green. She delivered first aid supplies to the headquarters garrison at the GPO, then withdrew to Killiney Hill and later returned home. In her diary, which was written in Irish, with parts later published in translation by Hilary Pyle as Cesca's Diary, she wrote of the Easter Rising as a tragic mistake. British soldiers who were shipped into Ireland to combat the Rising and who formed the firing squads that executed the leaders, were from the 2/5th and 2/6th battalion of her brother's regiment, the Sherwood Foresters.

She and her mother feared that she would be arrested for her involvement with the movement, but nothing happened, despite thousands of nationalist men and women being arrested and deported to English and Welsh jails. Cesca's brother, Reggie, had arrived in Dublin around 3 May, the day of the executions of the first three leaders Pearse, Thomas MacDonagh and Thomas Clarke after the Rising; he was an officer in the 2/5th battalion.

After the Rising, Trench continued to attend Cumann na mBan meetings, and to study Irish art in the National Museum. She organised a play about Brian Boru and painted murals at Carrigaholt Irish College. She made sketches of Sinn Féin and Gaelic League meetings and created Christmas cards. She befriended Lily Yeats of Dun Emer Press.

On Saint Patrick's Day 1917, 17 March, Trench agreed to marry Diarmid Coffey — despite earlier writing that, torn between Coffey and the glamorous Claud Chavasse, her love for Claud was "the real thing". Her brother Reggie, Acting Major with the 2/5th 59th, was killed on the Western Front three days after Coffey's proposal, in a German offensive that all but wiped out his regiment, the 59th, known as the Sherwood Foresters or Notts and Derby. He left a wife, Clare, and a baby daughter.

The couple decided – as many did in wartime – not to postpone their wedding despite her brother's death. Lily Yeats helped Cesca with her wedding gown. Cesca and Diarmid married on 17 April 1918, and had their honeymoon in the Kerry Gaeltacht.

That October, Cesca caught the virulent Spanish flu. She died on 30 October 1918, a major loss to Irish art. She was mourned as Sadhbh Trinseach by the Gaelic League.

== Works ==
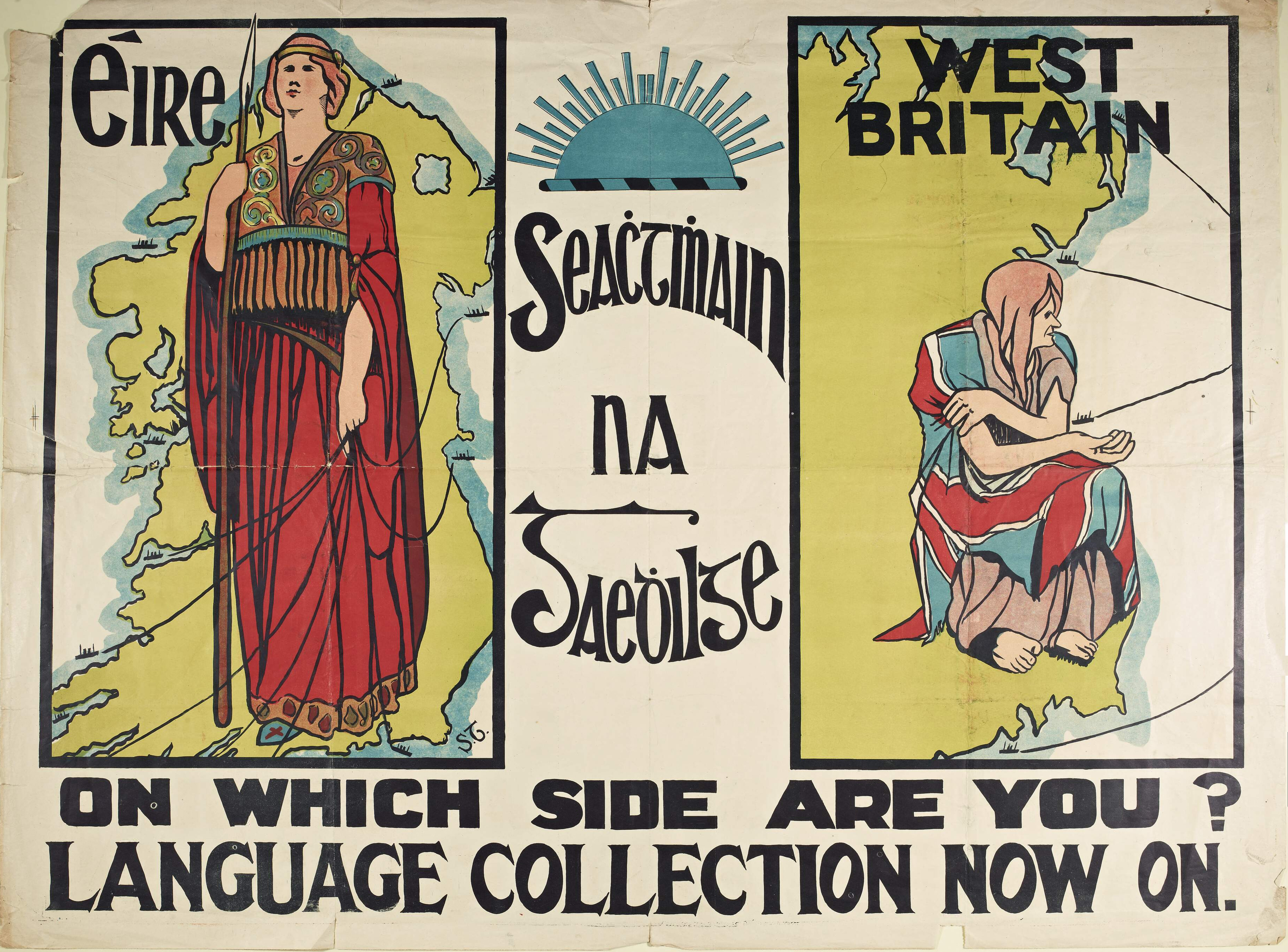
Seachtain na Gaeilge poster, 1913.

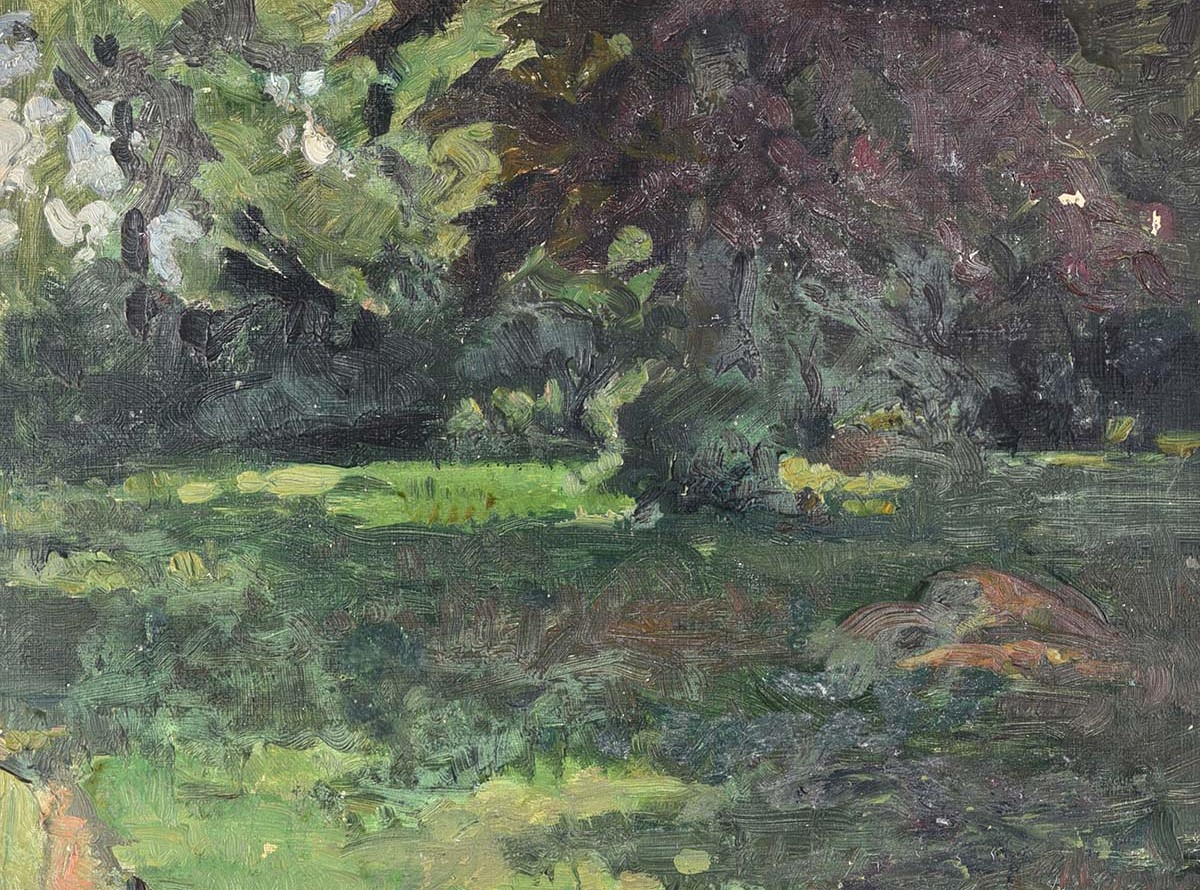
Temple Hill, Terenure, Dublin, oil painting, 1916.
