= 2022–23 All-Ireland Intermediate Club Football Championship =

Irish Gaelic football competition

- Dates: 22 October 2022 - 15 January 2023
- Teams: 32
- Sponsor: Allied Irish Bank
- Champions: Rathmore (1st title); Mark Ryan (captain); Denis Moynihan (manager)
- Runners-up: Galbally Pearses; Aidan Carberry (captain); Paddy Crozier (manager)

Tournament statistics
- Matches played: 31
- Goals scored: 61 (1.97 per match)
- Points scored: 638 (20.58 per match)
- Top scorer(s): Chrissy Spiers (0-25)

The 2022–23 All-Ireland Intermediate Club Football Championship was the 19th staging of the All-Ireland Intermediate Club Football Championship since its establishment by the Gaelic Athletic Association for the 2003–04 season. The draws for the respective provincial championships took place at various stages between June and September 2022. The championship ran from 22 October 2022 to 15 January 2023.

The All-Ireland final was played on 15 January 2023 at Croke Park in Dublin, between Rathmore from Kerry and Galbally Pearses from Tyrone. Rathmore won the match by 1-11 to 0-11 to claim their first ever championship title.

Rathmore's Chrissy Spiers was the championship's top scorer with 0-25.

== Connacht Intermediate Club Football Championship ==
=== Connacht quarter-final ===
12 November 2022 Quarter-final	St. Molaise Gaels	0-08 - 1-10	Dunmore MacHales	Tuam Stadium
	A McLoughlin 0-3, C Burns 0-1, K Waters 0-1, M Langan 0-1, C Herron 0-1, J Heraghty 0-1.		M Redington 1-2, J Slattery 0-3, S Murray 0-1, S McGrath 0-1, C Mitchell 0-1, P Costello 0-1, D Redington 0-1.

=== Connacht semi-finals ===
19 November 2022 Semi-final	Ballyhaunis	1-08 - 1-11	Dunmore MacHales	Hastings Insurance MacHale Park
	J Cunnane 1-0, Jason Coyne 0-3, A Philips 0-2, Jack Coyne 0-1, E Collins 0-1, M Lyons 0-1.		T Gleeson 1-1, P Costello 0-4, S McGrath 0-2, J Coen 0-2, C Mitchell 0-1, J Slattery 0-1.

26 November 2022 Semi-final	St. Dominic's	1-12 - 0-05	Aughnasheelan	Avant Money Páirc Seán Mac Diarmada
	D Keenan 1-3; D Donnelly 0-5,5f; K Doyle 0-2; K Dockery & T Hurley 0-1 each.	Report	F Fitzpatrick (2f) & G Sammon (M) 0-2 each; A Hoare 0-1, 1M.

=== Connacht final ===
3 December 2022 Final	St. Dominic's	1-13 - 1-16	Dunmore MacHales	St. Brigid's Park
	D Donnelly 0-5 (0-4f), C Kelly 1-1, D Keenan 0-3, K Doyle 0-2 (0-1m), T Hurley 0-1, B O’Meara 0-1.	Report	P Costello 0-5 (0-1f, 0-1m), S McGrath 1-0 (pen), J Slattery 0-3, T Gleeson 0-2 (0-1 ’45), M Redington 0-2, D Brady 0-1, J Coen 0-1, B Carr 0-1, D Redington 0-1.

== Leinster Intermediate Club Football Championship ==
=== Leinster first round ===
22 October 2022 First round	Fenagh	0-06 - 1-14	Éire Óg Greystones	Carlow IT
	C Lomax 0-3, J Treacy 0-1, P Hynes 0-1, S Smithers 0-1.		J Prendergast 1-4, D Hayden 0-3, S Cranley 0-3, D Keane 0-1, G O'Shea 0-1, C Keane 0-1, D Rooney 0-1.

22 October 2022 First round	Ballymahon	0-06 - 2-13	Cooley Kickhams	Glennon Brothers Pearse Park
	J Walshe 0-3, E Noonan 0-1, T Smullen 0-1, D Ryan 0-1.		M Rafferty 1-2, J O'Reilly 1-1, C Connor 0-3, E O'Neill 0-3, P Johnston 0-2, B White 0-1, F Malone 0-1.

22 October 2022 First round	Fethard St. Mogue's	2-10 - 0-11	The Heath	O'Kennedy Park
	E Whelan 1-2, M Ellis 1-0, J Tubritt 0-3, J Molloy 0-2, C Byrne 0-2, M Dwyer 0-1.		L Holland 0-4, J Phelan 0-2, D Carroll 0-2, C Booth 0-1, J Nerney 0-1, G Roe 0-1.

22 October 2022 First round	Mullinavat	2-06 - 1-07	Bracknagh	John Locke Park
	M Malone 1-1, P Gahan 1-0, I Duggan 0-2, J Walsh 0-1, I Aylward 0-1, O Knox 0-1.	Report	M Cunningham 1-2, S Geoghegan 0-3, R Galbraith 0-1, P Cunningham 0-1.

=== Leinster quarter-finals ===
5 November 2022 Quarter-final	Mullinavat	3-09 - 0-15	Shandonagh	John Locke Park
	M Malone 2-5, G Malone 1-0, I Duggan 0-2, T Aylward 0-1, L Fennelly 0-1.		B Kavanagh 0-11, T Molloy 0-3, L Tynan 0-1.

5 November 2022 Quarter-final	Dunshaughlin	2-19 - 0-10	Ballyteague	Páirc Tailteann
	J McDonagh 1-2, M Costello 0-5, C Gray 1-0, L Mitchell 0-3, A Murphy 0-3, R Kinsella 0-2, A McDermott 0-1, M Moyles 0-1, N Murphy 0-1.		J Hyland 0-7, F Murphy 0-2, B McGrath 0-1.

5 November 2022 Quarter-final	Cooley Kickhams	1-13 - 0-11	Naomh Barróg	Dowdallshill Grounds
	P Johnston 1-3, C Connor 0-3, B White 0-3, F Malone 0-2, E O'Neill 0-1, M Rafferty 0-1.		P Tolan 0-7, R Alexander 0-3, L Nolan 0-1.

5 November 2022 Quarter-final	Fethard St. Mogue's	1-11 - 0-11	Éire Óg Greystones	St. Patrick's Park
	C Byrne 0-5, M Ellis 1-0, J Molloy 0-1, J Sutton 0-1, R Waters 0-1, G O'Grady 0-1, J Tubritt 0-1, M Dwyer 0-1.		D Keane 0-3, S Cranley 0-2, D Wood 0-2, C Keane 0-2, F O'Shea 0-2.

=== Leinster semi-finals ===
19 November 2022 Semi-final	Dunshaughlin	0-14 - 0-06	Cooley Kickhams	Páirc Tailteann
	J McDonagh 0-4; M Costello 0-4 (1f); R Kinsella 0-2 (fs); A Murphy 0-1; M Moyles 0-1; B Duggan 0-1; C Duke 0-1.	Report	B White 0-4 (2 marks, 2 frees); F Malone 0-1; M Rafferty 0-1.

19 November 2022 Semi-final	Mullinavat	0-05 - 0-07	Fethard St. Mogue's	John Locke Park
	I Duggan 0-3, J Culleton 0-1, M Jones 0-1.		C Byrne 0-3, J Turbitt 0-3, M Ellis 0-1.

=== Leinster final ===
3 December 2022 Final	Fethard St. Mogue's	1-15 - 2-11	Dunshaughlin	Chadwick's Wexford Park
	C Byrne 0-6 (5 frees), J Tubritt 0-5 (3 frees), M Ellis 1-0, J Molloy 0-2 frees, R Waters 0-1, J Sutton 0-1.	Report	L Mitchell 0-6 (2 frees), M Costello 1-0, A Murphy 1-0, M Moyles 0-2, N Byrne 0-1, J McDonagh 0-1, C Duke 0-1.	Referee: A Coyne (Westmeath)

== Munster Intermediate Club Football Championship ==
=== Munster quarter-finals ===
12 November 2022 Quarter-final	Kildysart	0-06 - 3-11	Kanturk	Cusack Park
	E McMahon 0-5 (0-2f), M Donnellan 0-1.	Report	I Walsh 1-4 (0-4 f), Alan Walsh 1-1 (0-1 f), C Walsh 0-3, G Bucinskas 1-0, R Walsh, L McLoughlin, L O’Neill 0-1 each.	Referee: S Mulvihill (Kerry)

12 November 2022 Quarter-final	Na Piarsaigh	2-10 - 1-05	Roanmore	FitzGerald Park, Kilmallock
	E Sweeney 2-0, D Cronin 0-5, K Daly 0-2, E Egan 0-1, R McCarthy 0-1, J Barry 0-1.	Report	P O'Sullivan 1-1, S Nolan 0-2, S Pender 0-2.

=== Munster semi-finals ===
26 November 2022 Semi-final	Kanturk	2-06 - 1-17	Rathmore	Páirc Uí Chaoimh
	G Bucinskas 1-3 (1f, 1’mark’), I Walsh 1-0, A Walsh 0-2, C Walsh 0-1.	Report	C Spiers 0-7f, S Ryan 0-6 (2 ‘mark’, 1’45, 1f), J Moynihan 1-1, M Ryan, D Rahilly, J Darmody 0-1 each.	Referee: D O'Mahony (Tipperary)

27 November 2022 Semi-final	Na Piarsaigh	1-05 - 0-08; Penalties: 4-2	Ballina	FitzGerald Park, Kilmallock
	D Cronin 1-2 (0-1f, 0-1m); K Daly 0-2; E Sweeney 0-1.	Report	S O’Brien 0-4 (0-3f); E Power 0-2; J O’Mahoney, D Kelly 0-1 each.	Referee: C Maguire (Clare)

=== Munster final ===
11 December 2022 Final	Rathmore	1-17 - 0-10	Na Piarsaigh	Mallow GAA Complex
	C Spiers (0-12, 10 frees); D Rahilly (1-0); S Ryan (0-3, 1 free, 1 45); M Ryan, J Moynihan (0-1 each).	Report	K Daly (0-5, 1 45); D Cronin (0-3, 2 frees); C McMullen, T McKeown (0-1 each).	Referee: C Maguire (Clare)

== Ulster Intermediate Club Football Championship ==
=== Ulster preliminary round ===
5 November 2022 Preliminary round	Shane O'Neill's	1-08 - 1-09	Corduff	Athletic Grounds
	P O'Rourke (1-2, 0-2 frees), R O'Brien 0-2 (2f), D McCabe (0-2), E McCabe (0-1), R Fitzpatrick (0-1).		J McGarrell (1-1), F Hanratty (0-3 frees), D Marron (0-3, 0-1 free), J Hand (0-1), K McEnaney (0-1).

=== Ulster quarter-finals ===
12 November 2022 Quarter-final	Dunloy Cú Chulainn's	0-07 - 1-11	Dungloe	St. Mary's Park
	C Cunning 0-3, K Molloy 0-2, A Smyth 0-1, N Elliott 0-1.		S Sweeney 0-4, S McGee 1-0, B Curran 0-3, D Gallagher 0-2, D Rodgers 0-1, D Ward 0-1.

12 November 2022 Quarter-final	Devenish St. Mary's	0-10 - 0-13	Castlerahan	St. Joseph's Park
	B Mulroone 0-2, JJ O'Brien 0-2, J Flanagan 0-2, F O'Brien 0-2, T O'Flanagan 0-1, R Maguire 0-1.		C Daly 0-4, C McCabe 0-3, S Cooney 0-1, S Óg McGearty 0-1, O Kernan 0-1, E Flanagan 0-1, O O'Connell 0-1, K Cosgrove 0-1.

13 November 2022 Quarter-final	Glenullin	1-11 - 7-12	Galbally Pearses	Celtic Park
	N McNicholl 0-4, E Bradley 0-4, T Bradley 1-0, F Close 0-2, D O'Kane 0-1.		D Kerr 2-5, C Donaghy 2-2, B Carberry 1-0, R Nugent 1-0, L Rafferty 1-0, S Wylie 0-2, M Lennon 0-1, J Hetherington 0-1, M Donnelly 0-1.

13 November 2022 Quarter-final	Corduff	2-10 - 0-05	Saval	Grattan Park
	F Hanratty 0-6, J McGarrell 1-0, J McEnaney 1-0, D Marron 0-2, K McEnaney 0-2.		P Havern 0-4, B Turley 0-1.

=== Ulster semi-finals ===
27 November 2022 Semi-final	Castlerahan	1-05 - 0-09	Corduff	St. Oliver Plunkett Park
	P McGahern 1-0, O O'Connell 0-2, S Cooney 0-1, E Henry 0-1, O Kiernan 0-1.	Report	F Hanratty 0-3, S McEnaney 0-1, K McEnaney 0-1, J McEnaney 0-1, G McEnaney 0-1, D Marron 0-1, C Marron 0-1.

27 November 2022 Semi-final	Dungloe	0-10 - 1-12	Galbally Pearses	Celtic Park
	D Gallagher 0-5, 4f; D Curran, M Ward, A Ward, R Brennan and D Sweeney 0-1	Report	S Murphy 1-1; C Donaghey 0-3, 3f; D Kerr 0-2; C Morris 0-1; S Murphy 0-1; L Rafferty 0-1; E McGarrity 0-2; R Nugent 0-1; B Carberry 0-1;	Referee: P Clarke (Cavan)

=== Ulster final ===
21 December 2022 Final	Corduff	0-05 - 1-09	Galbally Pearses	Páirc Esler
	F Hanratty 0-2, G McEnaney, C McEnaney, J Hand 0-1 each.	Report	B Carberry 1-0, D Kerr 0-4 (2f, 1m), C Donaghy 0-2 (2f), C Morris, M Lennon, C Quinn 0-1 each.	Referee: S Laverty (Antrim)

== All-Ireland Intermediate Club Football Championship ==
=== All-Ireland semi-finals ===
7 January 2023 Semi-final	Fethard St. Mogue's	1-10 - 2-16	Rathmore	Páirc Uí Rinn
	R Waters (1-0); J Tubritt, C Byrne (0-3, 1 free, each); J Molloy, J Sutton, M Dwyer, G O’Grady (0-1 each).	Report	S Ryan (1-3, 0-1 free, 0-1 mark); M Ryan (0-4); J Moynihan (1-0); C Spiers 0-3 (1 free); B O’Keeffe, P Murphy, F Holohan, C Ryan, M Reen, B Friel (0-1 each).

7 January 2023 Semi-final	Dunmore MacHales	1-09 - 4-04	Galbally Pearses	St. Loman's Sportsgrund
	P Costello 0-6f, D Redington 1-0, S McGrath 0-1, D Brady 0-1, T Gleeson 0-1.	Report	R Nugent 3-1, D Kerr 1-1, L Rafferty 0-1, C Donaghy 0-1f.

=== All-Ireland final ===
15 January 2023 Final	Rathmore	1-11 - 0-11	Galbally Pearses	Croke Park
	S Ryan (1-3); C Spiers (0-3, 3 frees); J Darmody (0-2); M Ryan, B O'Keeffe, M Reen (0-1 each).	Report	C Donaghy (0-7, 6 frees, 1 45); D Kerr (0-3, 1 free); R Nugent (0-1).	Referee: B Tiernan (Dublin)

== Championship statistics ==
=== Top scorers ===
Overall

Rank	Player	Club	Tally	Total	Matches	Average
1	Chrissy Spiers	Rathmore	0-25	25	4	6.25
2	Daniel Kerr	Galbally Pearses	3-15	24	5	4.80
3	Shane Ryan	Rathmore	2-15	21	4	5.25
3	Conor Donaghy	Galbally Pearses	2-15	21	5	4.20
5	Cian Byrne	Fethard St. Mogue's	0-19	19	5	3.80
6	Pádraig Costello	Dunmore MacHales	0-16	16	4	4.00
7	Ronan Nugent	Galbally Pearses	4-03	15	5	3.00
7	Michael Malone	Mullinavat	3-06	15	3	5.00
7	John Tubritt	Fethard St. Mogue's	0-15	15	4	3.00
10	Fergal Hanratty	Corduff	0-14	14	4	3.50

In a single game

Rank	Player	Club	Tally	Total	Opposition
1	Chrissy Spiers	Rathmore	0-12	12	Na Piarsaigh
2	Daniel Kerr	Galbally Pearses	2-05	11	Glenullin
2	Michael Malone	Mullinavat	2-05	11	Shandonagh
2	Brian Kavanagh	Shandonagh	0-11	11	Mullinavat
5	Ronan Nugent	Galbally Pearses	3-01	10	Dunmore MacHales
6	Ian Walsh	Kanturk	1-04	7	Kildysart
6	Joe Prendergast	Éire Óg Greystones	1-04	7	Fenagh
6	Jimmy Hyland	Ballyteague	0-07	7	Dunshaughlin
6	Paul Tolan	Naomh Barróg	0-07	7	Cooley Kickhams
6	Chrissy Spiers	Rathmore	0-07	7	Kanturk
6	Conor Donaghy	Galbally Pearses	0-07	7	Rathmore
