= Suzanne Cory Medal for Biomedical Sciences =

Australian Science Award for research in all of the biological sciences

The Suzanne Cory Medal for Biomedical Sciences, also known as the Suzanne Cory Medal, is an annual award from the Australian Academy of Science. The area of research recognised by the prize alternates yearly, from the biomedical sciences to all the biological sciences (excluding biomedical sciences).

First established in 2021, it was named in honour of Suzanne Cory, an Australian molecular biologist. Cory's research advanced the understanding of the genetic causes of cancer. The award is open to all genders and any Australian biological science researcher.

== Winners ==
The medal was first awarded in 2021 and annually since:

- 2021 – Susanne von Caemmerer, plant physiologist & John Endler, evolutionary biologist
- 2022 –Georgia Chenevix-Trench, cancer researcher
- 2023 – Catherine Lovelock, marine biologist and ecologist & Terence Hughes, marine biologist
- 2024 – Peter Koopman, biologist researching genes and embryonic development
- 2025 – Steven Chown, ecology, physiology and conservation biology researcher.
- 2026 – Hala Zreiqat, for developing synthetic ceramic materials and implants that help regrow and repair bone.
