= John Endler =

Canadian biologist (born 1947)

John Endler FRS
- Born: John Arthur Endler; 1947 (age 78–79)
- Education: University of Edinburgh (PhD)
- Scientific career
- Fields: Ethology; Evolutionary biology
- Thesis: A Study of Morph-Ratio Clines (1973)
- Doctoral advisor: Bryan Clarke

John Arthur Endler FRS (born 1947) is a Canadian ethologist and evolutionary biologist noted for his work on the adaptation of vertebrates to their unique perceptual environments, and the ways in which animal sensory capacities and colour patterns co-evolve.

== Education and early life ==
Born in Canada, Endler took his PhD degree at the University of Edinburgh in Scotland.

== Career and research ==
After his PhD, Endler worked at Princeton University (1973-1979), the University of Utah (1979-1986), the University of California, Santa Barbara (1986-2006), the James Cook University of North Queensland, Australia and is currently working at Deakin University in Victoria, Australia. In 2006 he was appointed as an Anniversary Professor of Animal Behaviour in the School of Psychology at the University of Exeter, England. In 2007 he was elected as a Fellow of the American Academy of Arts and Sciences. In 2009 he joined the Centre for Integrative Biology at Deakin University (Australia) where he is an Alfred Deakin Professor.

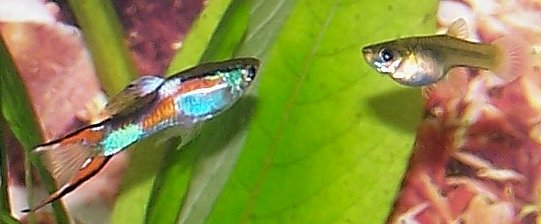
Endler's livebearer, now classified as Poecilia wingei

Endler has carried out extensive work on guppies, including in 1975 rediscovering the species now known to aquarists as Endler's guppy, in his honour; this brightly coloured fish is sometimes regarded as a geographical variant of the common guppy Poecilia reticulata, but is now usually treated as a separate species, Poecilia wingei. Although it had been recorded before Endler's discovery, it had not been properly studied and documented. Among biologists, however, he is better known for his experimental work on inducing small-scale evolution in the laboratory. In addition to his work on guppies he has studied many other species, including investigating the bower-building behaviour of bowerbirds in North Queensland, Australia.

In 2008 the European Research Council announced that he was among the first cohort of Life Scientists to receive an award under its Advanced Grants scheme.

In 2012 he was elected a Fellow of the Australian Academy of Science.

In April 2020 Endler was elected a Fellow of the Royal Society (FRS).

In 2021, he and Susanne von Caemmerer were jointly awarded the inaugural Suzanne Cory Medal for Biomedical Sciences.

Endler's work on evolution in trinidadian guppies was highlighted in the 1995 popular science book The Beak of the Finch.

=== Books ===
- Endler, John A. (1977). Geographic Variation, Speciation, and Clines. Princeton, NJ: Princeton University Press.
- Endler, John A. (1986). Natural Selection in the Wild. Princeton, NJ: Princeton University Press.

=== Journal articles ===
- Endler, J. A. (1980). Natural selection on color patterns in Poecilia reticulata. Evolution, 34, 76–91.
- Endler, J. A., McLellan, T. (1988). The Processes of Evolution: Toward a Newer Synthesis. Annual Review of Ecology and Systematics 19, 395–421.
- Endler, J. A. (1990). On the measurement and classification of color in studies of animal color patterns. Biological Journal of the Linnean Society, 41, 315–352.
- Reznick, D. A., Bryga, H., & Endler, J. A. (1990). Experimentally induced life history evolution in a natural population. Nature, 346, 357–359.
- Endler, J. A., & Day, L. B (2006). Ornament colour selection, visual contrast and the shape of colour preference functions in great bowerbirds, Chlamydera nuchalis. Animal Behaviour, 72, 1405–1416.
- Endler, J. A., & Mielke, P. W. (2005). Comparing entire colour patterns as birds see them. Biological Journal of the Linnean Society, 86, 405–431.
- Endler, J. A., Westcott, D. A., Madden, J. R., & Robson, T (2005). Animal visual systems and the evolution of color patterns: Sensory processing illuminates signal evolution. Evolution, 59, 1795–1818.
