= Peter Koopman =

Australian biologist (born 1959)

Peter Anthony Koopman FAA (born 3 December 1959) is an Australian biologist best known for his role in the discovery and study of the mammalian Y-chromosomal sex-determining gene, Sry.

== Early life and education ==
Peter Anthony Koopman was born on 3 December 1959 in Geelong, Victoria, to Dutch immigrant parents, and raised in the coastal town of Torquay, Victoria. He attended Oberon High School in Geelong, where he was School Captain. He studied science at the University of Melbourne from 1977 to 1979, majoring in genetics, and was a resident of Janet Clarke Hall. He undertook BSc Honours research at the Birth Defects Research Institute (now the Murdoch Children's Research Institute) at the Royal Children's Hospital, Melbourne, under the supervision of Richard (Dick) Cotton, and graduated with First Class Honours.

Continuing to work with Cotton, his PhD focused on stem cell differentiation in vitro. During this time, he also studied Japanese, Fine Arts and Dutch language and literature, receiving a BA degree from the University of Melbourne in 1985.

He was awarded a Doctor of Science (DSc) from the University of Queensland in July 2018.

== Career and research ==
=== Discovery of Sry and the genetics of sex determination ===
In 1988, Koopman was recruited to the Medical Research Council's National Institute for Medical Research at Mill Hill, London, working first with Anne McLaren, then joining a team led by Robin Lovell-Badge to search for the Y chromosomal sex-determining gene. Koopman demonstrated that activity of mouse homologues of the existing candidate, ZFY, was not consistent with a role in sex determination. Lovell-Badge's team, collaborating with Peter Goodfellow and colleagues at the Imperial Cancer Research Fund in London, discovered a new candidate gene, Sry. Koopman and colleagues injected Sry into fertilized XX mouse eggs which as a result developed as males, thus proving the male sex-determining role of Sry. The discovery is regarded as one of the major achievements in molecular genetics in the 20th century.

Much of Koopman's subsequent research has focused on understanding how Sry acts to direct the formation of testes in the embryo, triggering male development. This work has involved the identification and/or study of a large number of other genes involved in development of the testes or ovaries.

=== Sox genes ===
Establishing his own research group at the University of Queensland, Brisbane, Australia in 1992, Koopman set out to discover new members of a growing family of genes related to Sry – "Sox" genes. Among the first discoveries was Sox9, a key regulator of skeletal and testis development, which carries mutations in humans with the skeletal disorder campomelic dysplasia and associated XY sex reversal.

Koopman's group also discovered Sox18, a switch gene that directs formation of the lymphatic vessels, and is defective in humans with hypotrichosis-lymphedema-telangiectasia syndrome. Given the role of lymphatic vessels in tumour metastasis, Sox18 is being developed as a potential drug target for anti-metastatic cancer therapy.

Koopman found that the human and mouse genomes contain 20 Sox genes, and he proposed the naming system for Sox genes that continues to be used today.

=== Germ cell sex ===
Koopman's early work with Anne McLaren spawned an interest in the regulation of the germ cells during fetal development—cells that later become sperm or oocytes. His group discovered that the vitamin A metabolite retinoic acid stimulates germ cells to enter meiosis, a critical step in the formation of gametes. They also demonstrated that the developmental signaling molecule Nodal and its receptor Cripto regulate male germ cell pluripotency in the fetal gonad, opening the way for new non-invasive diagnostics and targeted additional therapies for testicular cancers.

=== Intersex advocacy ===
With a growing interest in human variations of sex development (alternatively known as DSD, differences or disorders of sex development, variations in sex characteristics, or intersex), Koopman began to engage with relevant clinicians and intersex advocacy and support groups. To cater for a need for unbiased information relating to the causes, types, impacts of DSD and options for affected people, Koopman authored a website, published under the auspices of the Australian National Health and Medical Research Council’s Research Program in Human DSD. He continues to work with the Australian Pediatric Endocrine Group and a range of advocacy groups to improve dialogue and management of these conditions.

=== Research integrity ===
From 2012 to 2017, Koopman worked as the University of Queensland's Executive Director of Research Integrity, providing academic stewardship of research integrity and managing allegations of research misconduct.

=== Equity and diversity ===
Koopman co-chairs the Equity and Diversity Reference Group of the Australian Academy of Science and is a member of the Women in Health Science Working Committee of NHMRC Australia, and is involved in developing the Decadal Plan for Women in STEM commissioned by the Australian Government.

== Awards and honours ==
1981: First Class Honours, Department of Genetics, The University of Melbourne

1992: AMP Biomedical Research Award, Australian Society for Medical Research

1992: Australian Research Fellowship, Australian Research Council

1998: Julian Wells Medal, Lorne Genome Conference Inc

2002: Australian Professorial Fellowship, Australian Research Council

2003: Amersham-Pharmacia Biotech Medal, Australian Society for Biochemistry and Molecular Biology

2005: President's Medal, Australia and New Zealand Society for Cell and Developmental Biology

2007: Australian Professorial Fellowship, Australian Research Council

2007: Award for Research Excellence, GSK Australia

2008: Fellow of the Australian Academy of Science (FAA)

2009: Lemberg Medal, Australian Society for Biochemistry and Molecular Biology

2024: Suzanne Cory Medal, Australian Academy of Science

== Other achievements ==
Koopman instigated the Australian Developmental Biology Workshop (2001- ), the Australian Sex Summit (2004- ), and the International Workshop on Sox Transcription Factors (2005 - ). He was organizer of the Cold Spring Harbor (USA) Workshop on Molecular Embryology of the Mouse (1995-1998), and Chair of the Gordon Research Conference on Germinal Stem Cell Biology (2017).

Koopman has trained 34 postdoctoral research staff and 28 PhD students. He has published more than 280 research papers that have been cited over 19,000 times.
