= Richard Chenevix (chemist) =

Irish chemist (1774–1830)

Richard Chenevix FRS FRSE
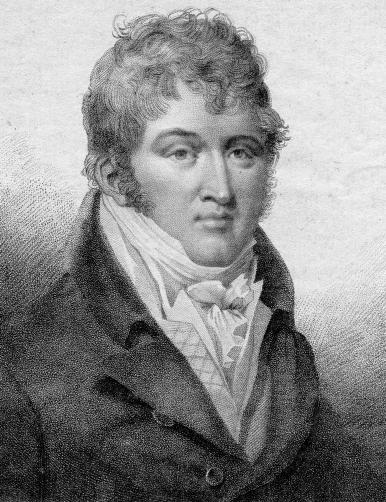
- Born: 1774; Ballycommon, County Offaly, Ireland
- Died: 5 April, 1830; Paris, France
- Education: Trinity College, Dublin (BA); University of Glasgow (no degree)
- Known for: Research works on mineralogy and chemical papers
- Awards: Copley Medal (1803)
- Honours: Fellow of the Royal Society (FRS); Fellow of the Royal Society of Edinburgh (FRSE)
- Scientific career
- Fields: Chemistry; Mineralogy; Literature
- Workplaces: Trinity College Dublin

Richard Chenevix FRS FRSE (ca. 1774 – 5 April 1830) was an Irish chemist, mineralogist and playwright who also wrote on a range of other topics. He was known for his sharp cynicism and for engaging in combative criticism. Chenevix received the Copley Medal in 1803, "for his various Chemical Papers printed in the Philosophical Transactions."

== Early life and family ==
He was born in Ballycommon, County Offaly, to Elizabeth Arabin and lieutenant-colonel Daniel Chenevix of the Royal Irish Artillery. His 3x great grandfather, Reverend Philip Chevenix, was a Huguenot settler who left France after Louis XIV's Edict of Fontainebleau revoked the earlier Edict of Nantes which had given additional rights to Protestants. His great uncle Richard, and namesake, was the Church of Ireland Bishop of Waterford and Lismore.

His sister, Sarah Elizabeth, married Captain Hugh Tuite of Sonna, Co. Westmeath, twice Member of Parliament for that county.

On 4 June 1812 he married "an aging French beauty of dubious reputation", Countess Jeanne Françoise de Rouault (?-1836), the widow of Comte Charles de Rouault, whom he had met at the home of Sir John Sebright.

== Education ==
He enrolled at Glasgow University in 1785, but did not take a degree; however, he did graduate A.B. from the University of Dublin.

== Career ==
Chenevix went to Paris after his university studies. He was imprisoned there for 15 months during the Reign of Terror. While in custody he had two children; also, amongst his fellow prisoners were a number of chemists who whetted his interest in the topic. After his release he studied at three different schools in Paris, gaining skills in chemical analysis. In 1798 he wrote his first paper, in French: 'Analysis of some magnesium rocks' in Annales de Chimie. Thereafter, in journals both sides of the Channel, he reported analyses of hydrochloric and sulphuric acids, compounds of lead, copper, iron, arsenic, carbon and sulphur and crystals of corundum including sapphires and rubies. He was made a fellow of the Royal Society in 1801 as a result of this work.

He wrote a paper in England in 1802 supporting French Neologist-inspired changes to chemical nomenclature. During a year in Germany, he published criticisms of the work of ground-breaking scientists: Danish chemist and physicist Hans Christian Ørsted and the German physicist, chemist and mineralogist Christian Samuel Weiss. In 1803, in the Philosophical Transactions of the Royal Society, he published a paper asserting that the palladium that the English chemist William Hyde Wollaston had extracted from platinum ore the previous year (and had announced and offered for sale anonymously) was in fact an alloy of mercury and platinum. For this seemingly astonishing result, he was awarded the Copley Medal. Wollaston, again anonymously, offered a reward to anyone who could confirm Chenevix's claims experimentally. On his part, Chenevix published a second paper supporting his result in 1805, by which time he'd made Paris his permanent home. Henry Cavendish, an admirer of Wollaston, was the sole Society objector in the vote for the publication. Later that year, Wollaston publicly revealed his authorship (although he had communicated as much to the Royal Society before Chenevix's second paper) and details of how he had, correctly, isolated the element palladium. Chenevix bore no apparent animus in later meetings between the two. How damaging the affair was to Chenevix's reputation as a chemist in the scientific world has been a discussion point for different writers. In 1808 came his criticism of Abraham Werner's classification of minerals. In 1809, he produced his final scientific paper, a method to produce acetone by distilling acetates. An English translation of a paper he wrote in 1808 for Annales de Chimie was published in London in 1811 as Observations on Mineralogical Systems.

Chenevix was a member of a number of European societies. The Royal Society has (a minimum of) twenty-six papers by Chenevix.

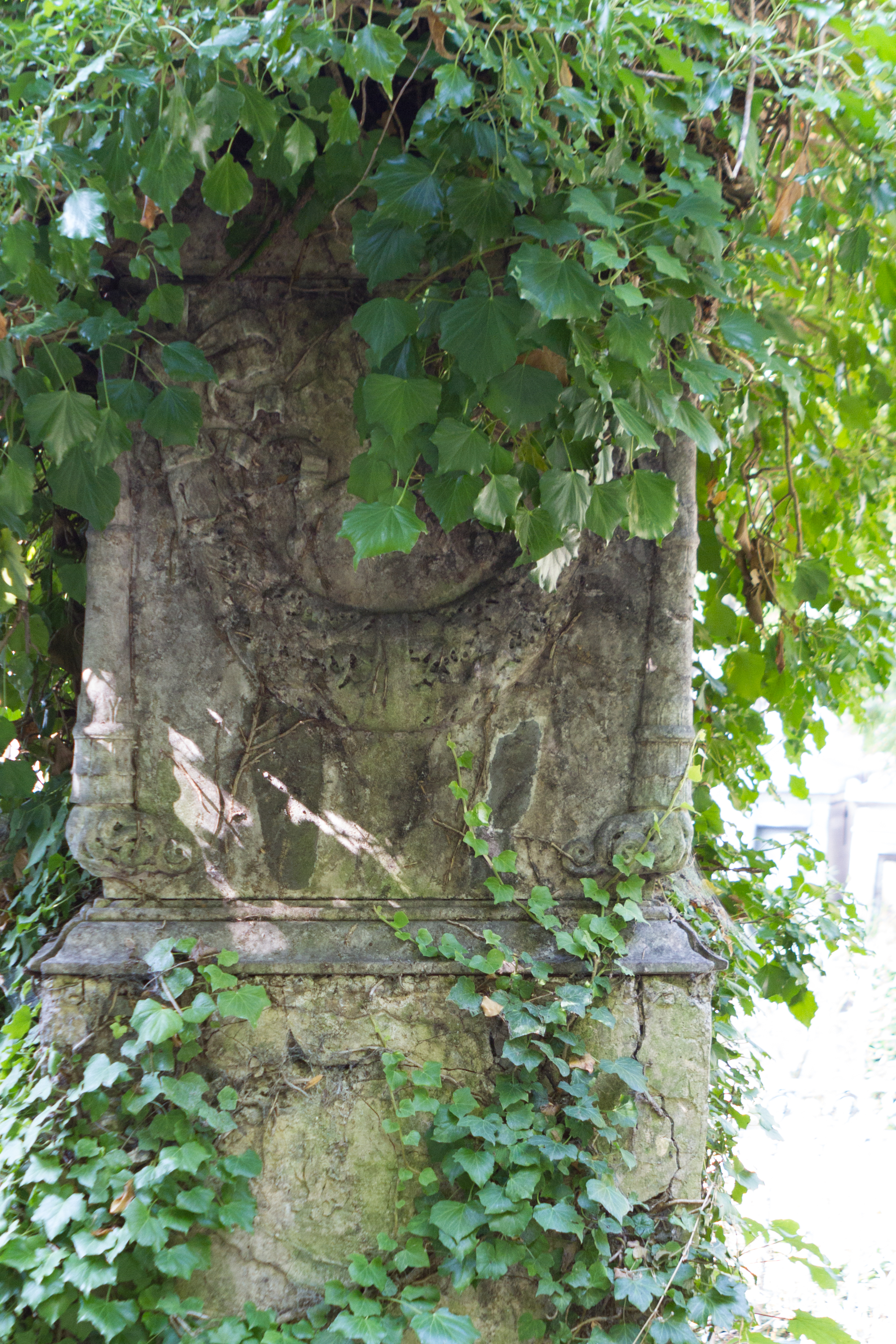
Père-Lachaise Cemetery.

== Phrenology and mesmerism ==
In November 1807, he attended the Paris lectures of the phrenologists Gall and Spurzheim; and, in 1828, published a review on Gall, Spurzheim, and Phrenology. Spurzheim was so impressed with Chenevix's review that he sought (and was granted) permission to immediately re-print the article as a pamphlet, with 12-page appendix of his (Spurzheim's) own notes.

In Paris, in 1816, he met Abbé Faria, who reawakened an interest in animal magnetism that had been dormant since Chenevix's visit to Rotterdam in 1797. In 1828, on a visit to Ireland, he began to practise mesmerism. He wrote extensively of his experiences in a series of papers published in the London Medical and Physical Journal in 1829.

Also in 1829, he gave a series of lectures and demonstrations of mesmerism in London that were attended by such eminent medical men as Sir Benjamin Brodie, William Prout, Henry Holland, Henry Earle, and John Elliotson.

== Works ==
In 1828 he wrote an anonymous review on Gall and Spurzheim's work on phrenology, which was reprinted two years later, with comments by Spurzheim, in London. The Edinburgh Review and Foreign Quarterly Review printed his various economic and cultural articles on France and England.

- 1802: Dramatic Poems: Leonora, a Tragedy; and Etha and Aidallo, a Dramatic Poem (Second Edition), London: W. Bulmer and Co.
- 1812: Two Plays: Mantuan Revels, a Comedy, in Five Acts; Henry the Seventh, an Historical Tragedy, in Five Acts, J. Johnson & Co.
- 1828: "Gall and Spurzheim — Phrenology", The Foreign Quarterly Review, Vol.2, No.3, pp.1-59.
- 1829: "On Mesmerism, Improperly Denominated Animal Magnetism", London Medical and Physical Journal, Vol.61, No.361, (March 1829), pp. 219–230; No.364, (June 1829), pp. 491–501; Vol.62, No.366, (August 1829), pp. 114–125; No.367, (September 1829), pp. 210–220; No.368, (October 1829), pp. 315–324.
- 1830: Phrenology Article of the Foreign Quarterly Review, by Rich. Chenevix, Esq., F.R.S., &c., With Notes from G. Spurzheim, M.D. of the Universities of Vienna and Paris, and Licentiate of the Royal College of Physicians of London, London; Treuttel, Würtz, and Richter.
- 1832: An Essay Upon National Character: Being an Inquiry into Some of the Principal Causes Which Contribute to Form and Modify the Characters of Nations in the State of Civilisation, in Two Volumes: Vol.I, London: J. Johnson & Co.
- 1832: An Essay Upon National Character: Being an Inquiry into Some of the Principal Causes Which Contribute to Form and Modify the Characters of Nations in the State of Civilisation, in Two Volumes: Vol.II, London: J. Johnson & Co.

== Death ==
He died in Paris on 5 April 1830, and was buried in the Père Lachaise Cemetery.

== Legacy ==
The mineral Chenevixite was named in his honour because of his earlier work analysing copper ferrate arsenates.
