= Charles Chenevix Trench =

British Indian army officer, historian and writer

Charles Pocklington Chenevix Trench (29 June 1914 – 26 November 2003) was a British Indian army officer, popular historian and writer.

== Life ==
Charles Pocklington Chenevix Trench was born in Simla, India, the only son of Sir Richard Chenevix Trench, a member of the Indian Political Service. Sir Richard was grandson of Richard Chenevix Trench (1807–1886), Archbishop of Dublin. Charles was a cousin of Anthony Chenevix-Trench, later headmaster of Eton College.

After studying at Winchester College and Magdalen College, Oxford, Charles received a regular Indian Army commission in 1934, joined Hodson's Horse in 1936, and became a fluent Pashto speaker. During the final weeks of 1st Army's advance into Tunisia in 1943, he was attached to the 12th Lancers.

In 1944, whilst attending a course at Benevento, he went to visit another Hodson's Horse officer who was a staff officer in 8th Indian Division. His friend put him on attachment to a Pathan company in the 1st Battalion of the 12th Frontier Force Regiment. Chenevix Trench won the Military Cross for his conduct leading the company in a night attack on the final ridge held by the Germans on the outskirts of Assisi during the push against the Gothic Line in northern Italy. He then returned to Hodson's Horse until 1946 before spending the last eighteen months of British rule in India in the Indian Political Service. 1946 also saw his marriage to Jane Gretton, daughter of an Irish Catholic – this marriage produced two daughters and a son (the son predeceased him) and ended in divorce. He had two more daughters with his second wife Mary Kirkbride, who survived him. A daughter, Georgia Chenevix-Trench, born in Kenya, is a distinguished cancer researcher in Australia.

Next he became district commissioner of the Northern Frontier District of Kenya and then in Nanyuki. He learned Swahili and Somali and was seconded to Nairobi to help cope with the Mau Mau Emergency. Kenya gained independence in 1963 and he took up teaching at Millfield in Somerset, remaining there until 1969, when he retired to Nenagh in County Tipperary to focus on writing. As well as his books, he wrote as a book reviewer for the Irish Times and the Irish Independent after being recruited by Bruce Arnold. He produced a monthly article for Blackwood's Magazine, using the pseudonym "The Looker On". He is buried in the churchyard at Borrisnafarney.

== Works ==
- My Mother Told Me (1958), on the travels of his maternal grandmother
- Portrait of a Patriot (1962), a biography of John Wilkes
- The Poacher and the Squire (1964), a history of poaching and game preservation in England
- The Royal Malady (1964), a study of George III's first bout of madness in 1788–89
- The Desert's Dusty Face (1964), describing his career in Kenya
- The Western Rising (1969), an account of the Monmouth Rebellion
- The Fly-Fisher and His Rod (1969)
- The Shooter and His Gun (1969)
- A History of Horsemanship (1970)
- George II (1973), a biography of George II
- A History of Angling (1974)
- Charley Gordon: An Eminent Victorian Reassessed (1978), a biography of General Gordon
  - Published in the US as: The Road to Khartoum: A Life of General Charles Gordon (1979)
- A History of Marksmanship (1980)
- The Great Dan (1984), a biography of the Irish nationalist leader Daniel O'Connell
- The Frontier Scouts (1985), relating to the North-West Frontier
- The Viceroy's Agent (1987), on Louis Mountbatten's time as Viceroy of India
- The Indian Army and the King's Enemies, 1900–1947 (1988)
- Men Who Ruled Kenya: The Kenya Administration, 1892-1963 (1993)
- Grace's Card: Irish Catholic Landlords 1690–1800 (1997)

He was a contributor to The Treasury of Horses (1972).
