= Susanne von Caemmerer =

Australian plant physiologist

Susanne von Caemmerer FRS
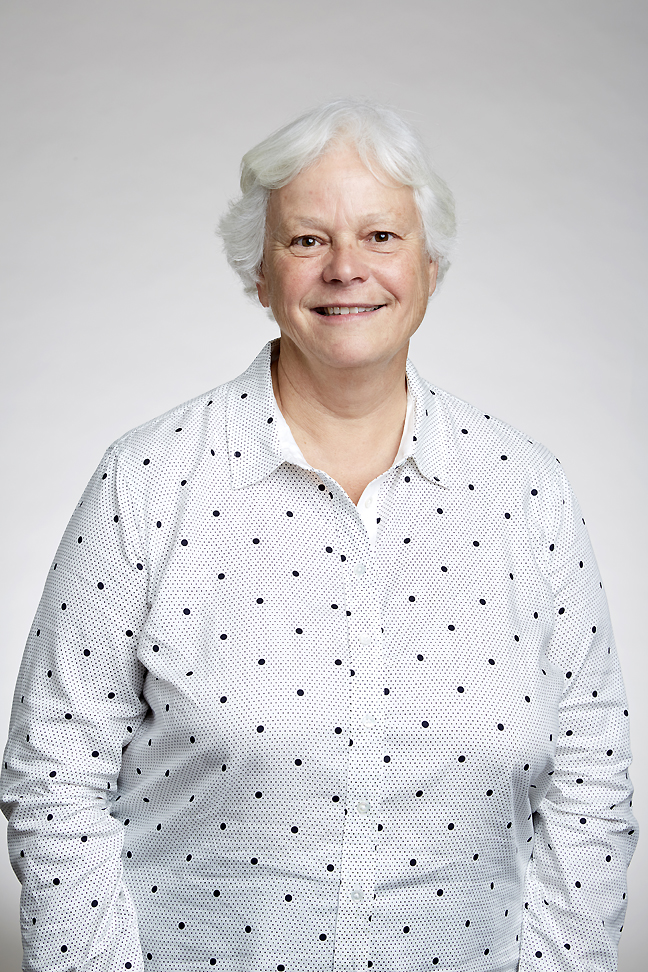
- von Caemmerer in 2017
- Education: Australian National University
- Scientific career
- Fields: Plant physiology
- Workplaces: Australian National University
- Thesis: On the relationship between chloroplast biochemistry and gas exchange of leaves (1981)
- Website: biology.anu.edu.au/research/labs/von-caemmerer-lab-co2-fixation-and-water-loss-leaves

Susanne von Caemmerer is an Australian plant physiologist who is a professor and plant physiologist in the Division of Plant Sciences, Research School of Biology at the Australian National University; and the Deputy Director of the ARC Centre of Excellence for Translational Photosynthesis. She has been a leader in developing and refining biochemical models of photosynthesis.

== Education ==
von Caemmerer received a Bachelor of Arts degree in mathematics in 1976 from Australian National University, she received her PhD in plant physiology in 1981.

== Career and Research ==
With Graham Farquhar and Joe Berry, her early work in plant physiology led to the development of a biochemical model of C3 photosynthesis. The model that mathematically describes the balance of photosynthetic limitations between light-driven energy supply and carbon diffusion substrate supply has become a cornerstone of research into photosynthesis at the leaf-level and carbon fluxes at larger scales.

She currently serves on the editorial board of the journal Plant, Cell & Environment.

=== Honours and awards ===
She was awarded the Charles F. Kettering Award in recognition of her excellence in the field of photosynthesis in 2014 by the American Society of Plant Biologists.

She was elected a fellow of the Australian Academy of Science, the German Academy of Sciences Leopoldina in 2006 and a Fellow of the Royal Society in 2017.

In 2021, she and John Endler were jointly awarded the inaugural Suzanne Cory Medal for Biomedical Sciences.

In 2025 she was awarded the Royal Medal of the Royal Society.
