= Francis Chenevix Trench =

British theologian

Francis Chenevix Trench

Francis Chenevix Trench (1805–1886) was an English divine and author.

Francis, born in 1805, was the eldest son of Richard Trench (1774–1860), barrister-at-law, by his wife Melesina Trench, Richard Chenevix Trench was his younger brother. Francis entered Harrow School early in 1818, and matriculated from Oriel College, Oxford, on 12 November 1824, graduating B.A. in 1834 and M.A. in 1859. On 4 June 1829, he entered Lincoln's Inn with the intention of studying law, but in 1834 he was ordained deacon and became curate of St. Giles, Reading. In the following year, he was ordained priest, and on 13 September 1837, he was appointed perpetual curate of St. John's, Reading. In 1857 he was instituted to the rectory of Islip, Oxfordshire, which he held till 1875 when he retired from active work. He died in London on 3 April 1886. On 6 December 1837, he married Mary Caroline (d. 1886), daughter of William Marsh, honorary canon of Worcester. By her, he had a son, Richard William Francis (1849–1860), and two daughters, Mary Melesina and Maria Marcia Fanny.

Trench's chief works were:

- Remarks on the Advantages of Loan Funds for the Poor and Industrious, London, 1833, 8vo.
- Sermons preached at Reading, London, 1843, 8vo.
- Diary of Travels in France and Spain, London, 1845, 12mo.
- Scotland: its Faith and its Features, London, 1846, 12mo.
- A Walk round Mont Blanc, London, 1847, 12mo.
- The Portrait of Charity, London, 1847, 16mo.
- The Life and Character of St. John the Evangelist, London, 1850, 8vo.
- G. Adey: his Life and Diary, London, 1851, 8vo.
- A Ride in Sicily, London, 1851, 12mo.
- Theological Works, London, 1857, 8vo.
- A few Notes from Past Life, Oxford, 1862, 8vo.

He also issued in 1869 and 1870 a series of miscellaneous papers, entitled Islipiana. He was a contributor to Macmillan's Magazine and to Notes and Queries.
