= Cian Byrne (hurler) =

Irish hurler

Personal information
- Native name: Cian Ó Broin (Irish)
- Born: 2003 (age 22–23) Fethard; County Wexford, Ireland

Sport
- Sport: Hurling
- Position: Centre-forward
Club
- Years: Club
- Fethard St Mogues
Club titles
- Wexford titles: 0
College
- Years: College
- Mary Immaculate College
College titles
- Fitzgibbon titles: 0
Inter-county
- Years: County
- 2022-present: Wexford
Inter-county titles
- Leinster titles: 0
- All-Irelands: 0
- NHL: 0
- All Stars: 0

Cian Byrne (born 2003) is an Irish hurler. At club level he plays with Fethard St Mogues and at inter-county level with the Wexford senior hurling team.

== Career ==
Byrne first played hurling and Gaelic football to a high standard as a student at Good Counsel College. He also played at juvenile levels with Moguegeen Gaels before progressing to adult level as a dual player with Fethard St Mogues. Byrne won a Wexford IFC title in 2022 and was top scorer when the club later claimed the Leinster Club IFC title after a defeat of Dunshaughlin.

Byrne first appeared on the inter-county scene with Wexford as a member of the minor team that beat Kilkenny to win the Leinster MHC title in 2019. He later spent two years with the under-20 team and was top scorer both seasons. Byrne first played for the senior team during the 2022 Walsh Cup.

== Honours ==
Fethard St Mogues

- Leinster Intermediate Club Football Championship: 2022
- Wexford Intermediate Football Championship: 2022

Wexford

- Walsh Cup: 2024
- Leinster Minor Hurling Championship: 2019
