= Melesina Trench =

Irish writer

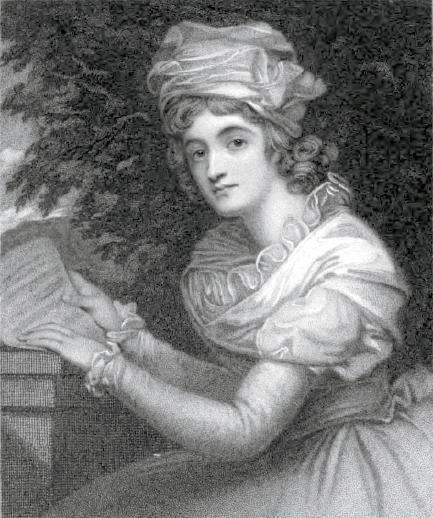
- Born: Melesina Chenevix; 22 March 1768; Dublin
- Died: 27 May 1827 (aged 59); Malvern, Worcestershire
- Resting place: Guardian Angel's Chapel in Winchester Cathedral
- Spouse(s): Colonel Richard St George, Richard Trench
- Children: Charles Manners St George, Richard Chenevix Trench, Francis Chenevix Trench
- Relatives: Richard Chenevix
- Writing career
- Genres: Diarist, poet

Melesina Trench (née Chenevix, previously St George; 22 March 1768 – 27 May 1827) was an Irish writer, poet and diarist. During her lifetime she was known more for her beauty than her writing, and it wasn't until her son, Richard Chenevix Trench, published her diaries posthumously in 1861 that her work received notice.

== Biography ==
Melesina Chenevix was born in Dublin to Philip Chenevix and Mary Elizabeth Gervais. She was orphaned before her fourth birthday and brought up by her paternal grandfather, Richard Chenevix (1698–1779), the Anglican Bishop of Waterford. The family were of Huguenot extraction.

After the death of Richard Chenevix she went to live with her other grandfather, the Archdeacon Gervais. On 31 October 1786 she married Colonel Richard St George. Her husband died only four years later in Portugal, leaving one son, Charles Manners St George, who became a diplomat.

Between 1799 and 1800, Melesina travelled around Europe, especially Germany. It was during these travels that she met Lord Nelson, Lady Hamilton and the cream of European society, including Rivarol, Lucien Bonaparte, and John Quincy Adams while living in Germany. She later recounted anecdotes of these meetings in her memoirs.

On 3 March 1803 in Paris she married again. Her second husband was Richard Trench, sixth son of Frederick Trench and brother of Lord Ashtown.

After the breakdown of the Peace of Amiens, Richard Trench was detained in France by Napoleon's armies, and in August 1805 Melesina took it upon herself to petition Napoleon in person and plead for her husband's release. Her husband was released in 1807, and the couple settled at Elm Lodge in Bursledon, Hampshire, England.

Their son Francis Chenevix Trench was born in 1805. In 1807, when they were on holiday in Dublin, their son Richard Chenevix Trench was born. He went on to be the Archbishop of Dublin, renowned poet and contemporary of Tennyson. Her only daughter died a few years later, aged four.

== Diaries and correspondence ==
She corresponded with (amongst others) Mary Leadbeater, with whom she worked to improve the lot of the peasantry at her estate at Ballybarney.

Melesina Trench's diaries and letters were compiled posthumously by Richard Chenevix Trench as The remains of the late Mrs. Richard Trench in 1861 with an engraving of her taken from a painting by George Romney. Another oil painting, The Evening Star by Sir Thomas Lawrence, had her as a subject, and she was reproduced in portrait miniatures; one in Paris by Jean-Baptiste Isabey and another by Hamilton that was copied by the engraver Francis Engleheart.

Copies of a number of her works are held at Chawton House Library.

== Select works ==
- Journal Kept During a Visit to Germany in 1799, 1800. Edited by the Dean of Westminster (R. C. Trench).
- Mary, Queen of Scots, an historical ballad: With other poems (1800)
- Campaspe, an historical tale, and other poems (1815)
- Laura's dream; Or, The Moonlanders (1816)
- The Remains of the Late Mrs Richard Trench: Being Selections From Her Journals, Letters, & Other Papers edited by St. George Trench
- Thoughts Of A Parent On Education (1837) edited by Elizabeth Whately
- Melesina Trench: poems and letters from her journal. 1977.
