= Georgia Chenevix-Trench =

Australian scientist

Professor Georgia Chenevix-Trench FAA FAHMS

Personal details
- Born: 8 February 1959 (age 67) Nairobi, Kenya

Georgia Chenevix-Trench (born 8 February 1959) is a distinguished Kenyan-Australian cancer researcher who investigates genetic predispositions to cancer.

== Early life ==
Chenevix-Trench was born in Nairobi, Kenya. Her father, Charles Pocklington Chenevix Trench, was district commissioner of the Northern Frontier District of Kenya during the British colonial period.

== Education ==
Chenevix-Trench received her undergraduate degree (BSc(Hons)) in 1980 from the department of genetics at Trinity College in Ireland and was subsequently awarded her PhD in 1985 from the department of human genetics at the Medical College of Virginia, USA, and in 1986 she commenced her post-doctoral work there. In 1989, she moved to Brisbane, Australia where she started working as a research officer at the Queensland Institute of Medical Research (QIMR). She currently works at the QIMR Berghofer Medical Research Institute, where she heads a cancer genetics research lab.

== Distinctions ==
Chenevix-Trench was elected to the Australian Academy of Science in 2014, for her work on the genetics of breast, ovarian and other cancers, including showing that mutations in the ATM gene confer moderate risks for breast cancer. In 2015 she was elected Fellow of the Australian Academy of Health and Medical Sciences. She was awarded the Suzanne Cory Medal and Lecture by the Australian Academy of Science in 2022. In 2022, Chenevix-Trench was awarded the GSK Award for Research Excellence (ARE).

== Publications ==
Chenevix-Trench has published over 400 papers in peer-reviewed journals and has been actively involved in science education and communication. She also has hold numerous patents with other scientists.

== Selected publications ==
Mutations of the BRAF gene in human cancer

Patterns of somatic mutation in human cancer genomes

The potential of Senicapoc, a KCNN4 inhibitor, for the prevention and treatment of breast cancer

Germline variants and breast cancer survival in patients with distant metastases at primary breast cancer diagnosis.

Breast cancer risks associated with missense variants in breast cancer susceptibility genes
