= Charles Este =

Charles Este (1696–1745) was bishop of Ossory (1735–1740) and subsequently of Waterford and Lismore (1740–1745).

Born at Whitehall, the son of Michael Este, and educated at Westminster School and Christ Church, Oxford, he distinguished the latter as joint editor of Carmina quadragesimalia ab aedis Christi alumnis composita…, 1723 (and subsequent editions), to which he himself contributed.

Receiving the patronage of Archbishop Boulter of Armagh whom he served as chaplain from 1724, he moved to Ireland and was collated to the rectory of Derrynoose on 9 Jan 1626. He married Susanna Clements in May 1725 and was subsequently raised to the archdeaconry of Armagh in 1730 and to the chancellorship of Armagh in 1733. He was nominated in January 1736 to become bishop of Ossory and was consecrated in February 1737. Subsequently he moved to become bishop of Waterford and Lismore on 18 July 1744.

He restored the (former) bishop's palace at Kilkenny which had become derelict by 1661, installing notably a double staircase and was largely responsible, commissioning the architect Richard Castle, for the design (Italianate windows) of the former bishop's palace at Waterford. Unfortunately Richard Cassels left him in the lurch when he accepted a commission from the wealthy Fitzgerald family to build Leinster House and so the commission passed to local architect John Roberts. By the time the new Bishop's Palace was completed, Bishop Este never got to live in his new household. He died on 2 December 1745.
