= Lily Williams (artist) =

Irish portrait painter (1874 – 1940)

- Born: Elizabeth Josephine Williams; 20 October 1874; Rathmines, Dublin, Ireland
- Died: 16 January 1940 (aged 65); Ranelagh, Dublin, Ireland
- Known for: Portraiture, postage stamp design

Lily Williams ARHA (20 October 1874 – 16 January 1940) was an Irish portrait painter. She also designed a definitive Irish postage stamp.

== Life ==
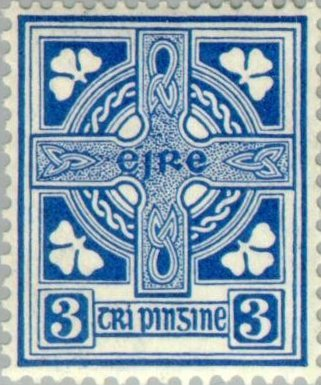
Irish three-penny definitive Cross of Cong postage stamp designed by Williams

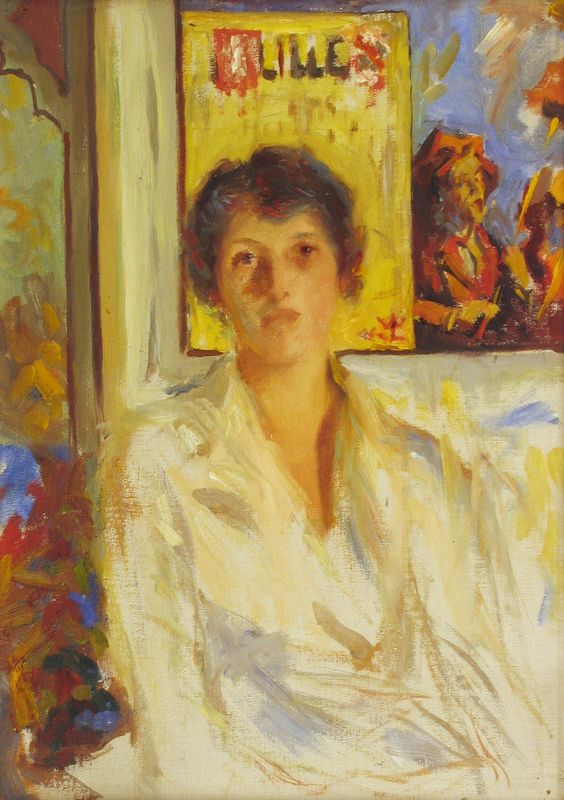
Moyra (now in the Hugh Lane Gallery, Dublin)

Lily Williams was born Elizabeth Josephine Williams in Rathmines, Dublin on 20 October 1874. She initially studied art under Mary Manning, going on to enrol in the Dublin Metropolitan School of Art. She studied alongside Estella Solomons and Cissie Beckett. She was a member of the Dublin Sketching Club. Williams exhibited with the Royal Hibernian Academy annually from 1904 to 1939. She became an associate of the RHA in 1929.

Williams was a Republican and supporter of Sinn Féin, which led to her falling out with her Protestant, Unionist family during the Easter Rising in 1916. Some of her best known paintings feature nationalist themes or are portraits of figures relating to Irish independence. She also designed the Irish Free State's Cross of Cong postage stamp in 1922; the design was used until 1968.

Williams died on 16 January 1940 at her home in Ranelagh, Dublin. The Hugh Lane Gallery holds a half-length portrait by her of Arthur Griffith, in oils. She was featured in the 2014 exhibition, Irish Women artists: 1870 - 1970. Her papers are held in the National Library of Ireland.

== Selected work ==
- Portrait of Dr Kathleen Lynn, held in the collections of the Royal College of Surgeons in Ireland
- Hibernia (1907)
