= Richard Chenevix (bishop) =

The Right Reverend Dr Richard Chenevix
- Bishop of Waterford and Lismore
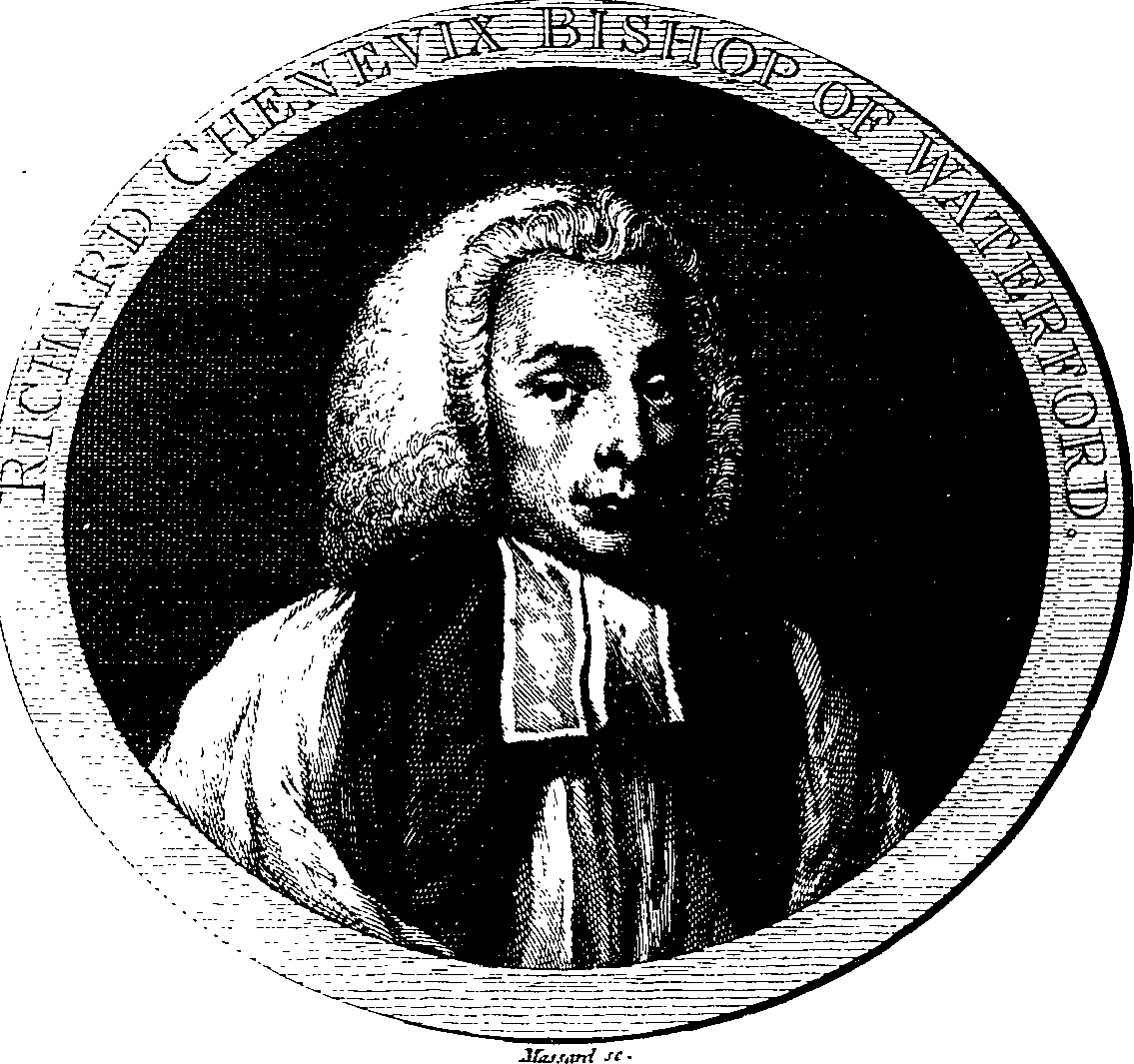
- Richard Chenevix
- Installed: 15 January 1746
- Term ended: 11 September 1779
- Predecessor: Charles Este
- Successor: William Newcome
- Other post: Bishop of Killaloe

Orders
- Consecration: 28 July 1745 by Charles Cobbe

Personal details
- Born: Richard Chenevix
- Died: 11 September 1779 Waterford
- Denomination: Church of Ireland
- Children: Philipa Melosina, Philip Chenevix
- Education: Peterhouse, Cambridge

Richard Chenevix (1698 – 11 September 1779) was Bishop of Waterford and Lismore. He was the grandfather of Melesina Trench and was responsible for her upbringing after she was orphaned, until his death.

== Family ==
Chenevix was the son of Major Philip Chenevix of the guards, and grandson of Reverend Philip Chenevix. Philip Chenevix had been the Protestant pastor of Limay, had settled in England after the revocation of the Edict of Nantes as his brother had been murdered because of his religion.

He had a daughter Phillipa Melosina who married Henry Alcock, who became M.P. for Waterford. She died giving birth to a son, 14 May 1765.

He also had a son Philip Chenevix, who married Mary Elizabeth Gervais, and they had a single child, Melesina, in 1768. Both Philip and Mary died before Melesina's fourth birthday, and she was sent to live with her grandfather. He looked after her until his death when she was eleven. He determined that she had a promise of genius and rejected traditional female education as inappropriate for her, instead he encouraged her to read as much as possible, and she explored his library. When he died Melesina was his sole heir.

== Life ==
Chenevix was educated at Bishop's Stortford School and Peterhouse, Cambridge, being admitted in 1713, graduating BA in 1717, MA in 1732, DD in 1744.

In 1719 he took orders and entered into the service of the Earl of Scarbrough as domestic chaplain, then in 1728 he entered the service of the Earl of Chesterfield. When in 1745 the Earl of Chesterfield was appointed to be Lord Lieutenant of Ireland, Chenevix accompanied him as domestic chaplain. It was through the influence of the Earl of Chesterfield that Chenevix was appointed as Bishop of Killaloe on 20 May 1745 before being translated to the more lucrative bishopric of Waterford and Lismore on 15 January 1746. He remained as Bishop of Waterford and Lismore until his death at Waterford in 1779.

Chenevix was persuaded to replace the old Gothic cathedral in Waterford with a new Cathedral, which was begun in 1773 and completed in the year of Chenevix's death in 1779. The bishop selected the architect, John Roberts, who had recently finished building his new bishops palace. In fact Chenevix was so pleased with this work that he granted to the architect his old palace on long lease.

== Sources ==
H. M. Stephens, rev. Philip Carter. "Chenevix, Richard (1696/7–1779)". Oxford Dictionary of National Biography (online ed.). Oxford University Press. doi:10.1093/ref:odnb/5216. (Subscription, Wikipedia Library access or UK public library membership required.)

Religious titles
Preceded by Jemmett Browne	Bishop of Killaloe; 1745–1746	Succeeded by Nicholas Synge
Preceded by Charles Este	Bishop of Waterford and Lismore; 1746–1779	Succeeded by William Newcome
