= Bracknagh GAA =

Gaelic games club in County Offaly, Ireland

Bracknagh
- Breacánach
- Founded: 1973
- County: Offaly
- Colours
- Grounds: Clonsast
- Coordinates: 53°13′00.9″N 7°08′33.5″W

Playing kits
Standard colours

Senior Club Championships
	All Ireland	Leinster champions	Offaly champions
Football:	0	0	0

Bracknagh GAA is a Gaelic Athletic Association (GAA) club based in Bracknagh, County Offaly, Ireland. It participates in competitions organised by the Offaly GAA county board.

== History ==
While Gaelic football was played in the local area as early as 1910, there was a period where no standalone club represented Bracknagh during the mid-20th-century. The club was established, in its current form, in 1973.

Underage players and Ladies' Gaelic football players from Bracknagh line out with the St. Broughans club along with their parish neighbour clubs Walsh Island and Clonbullogue.

== Achievements ==
- Offaly Senior B Football Championship (2): 2019, 2022
- Offaly Intermediate Football Championship (4): 1978, 1983, 2000, 2016
- Leinster Junior Club Football Championship (0): (runners-up in 2016)
