= Mucklagh, County Offaly =

Mucklagh Irish: An Muclach
- Village
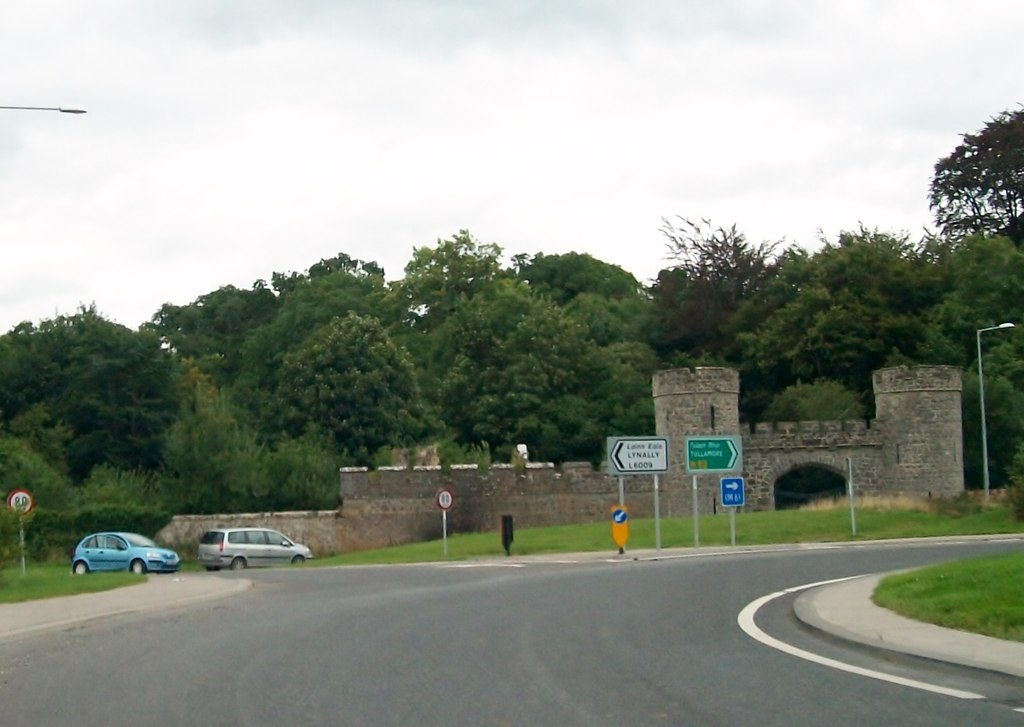
- Castellated gateway of Charleville Demesne near Mucklagh

- Location in Ireland
- Coordinates: 53°15′01″N 7°33′03″W
- Country: Ireland
- Province: Leinster
- County: Offaly

Population (2016)
  - Total: 826

Mucklagh (Irish: An Muclach) is a townland and village in County Offaly, Ireland. It is located 5 km southwest of Tullamore. As of the 2016 census, the population of Mucklagh was 826 people.

== Amenities ==
Mucklagh contains a number of businesses including a shop, bar, petrol station, hairdressers, nursing home, and a primary school.

Shamrocks GAA Club is also located in Mucklagh.

== Places of interest ==
=== Castle Gate ===
Located at the junction of the Tullamore by-pass at Mucklagh is Castle Gate, a towered stone entrance to Charleville Estate (also known as Charleville Demesne). Beside the gate, and inside the estate's wall, are the ruins of a gate lodge which was inhabited up to the early 1970s.

=== Marian Shrine ===
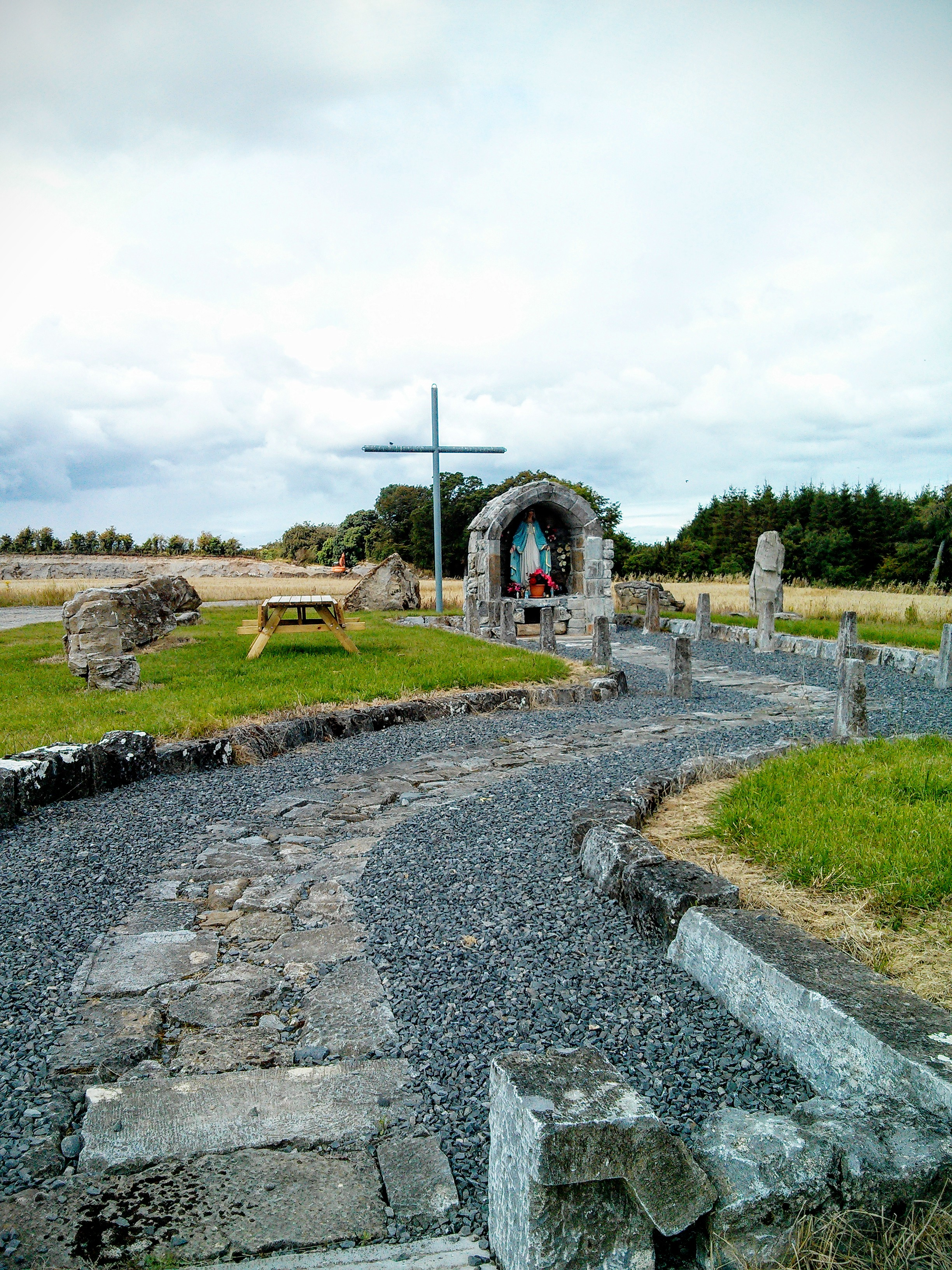
Marian Shrine Mucklagh

Located at Screggan Cross to the south of Mucklagh is the Marian Shrine. It includes walking paths and a picnic seating area.

The arched stonework used to build the Marian Shrine came from the de-consecrated Church of St. Colman, Mucklagh. That building was de-consecrated in 1979 when a new Church of St. Colman was opened in September that year. The old church was demolished some years afterwards.

=== Mill Field ===
The Mill Field was the name given to a large field used for sports events in Mucklagh. Adjoining the field was St.Colman's National School, opened in 1953. When the school was extended in the 1980s, the section of the Mill Field fronting the main road was transferred to the school.

The Mill Field was cultivated into a fine sports pitch and is now the home of Mucklagh Shamrocks GAA Club.

The field got its name from a mill race which transected the field from Brocca road and extended across farmland to Charleville Estate. The mill race behind the houses between the Mill Field and Charleville Estate was closed over the 1960s/1970s. The path of the mill race is evident on the ordnance survey maps from the 1840s.

== Events ==
Adjoining Mucklagh to the south is the townland of Screggan. The National Ploughing Championships took place in Screggan from 20 to 22 September 2016 with a record attendance. The event returned to Screggan again in September 2017 and 2018. It also took place in 2025.
