= Ballycommon, County Offaly =

Parish and village in Leinster, Ireland

Ballycommon
- Parish/Village
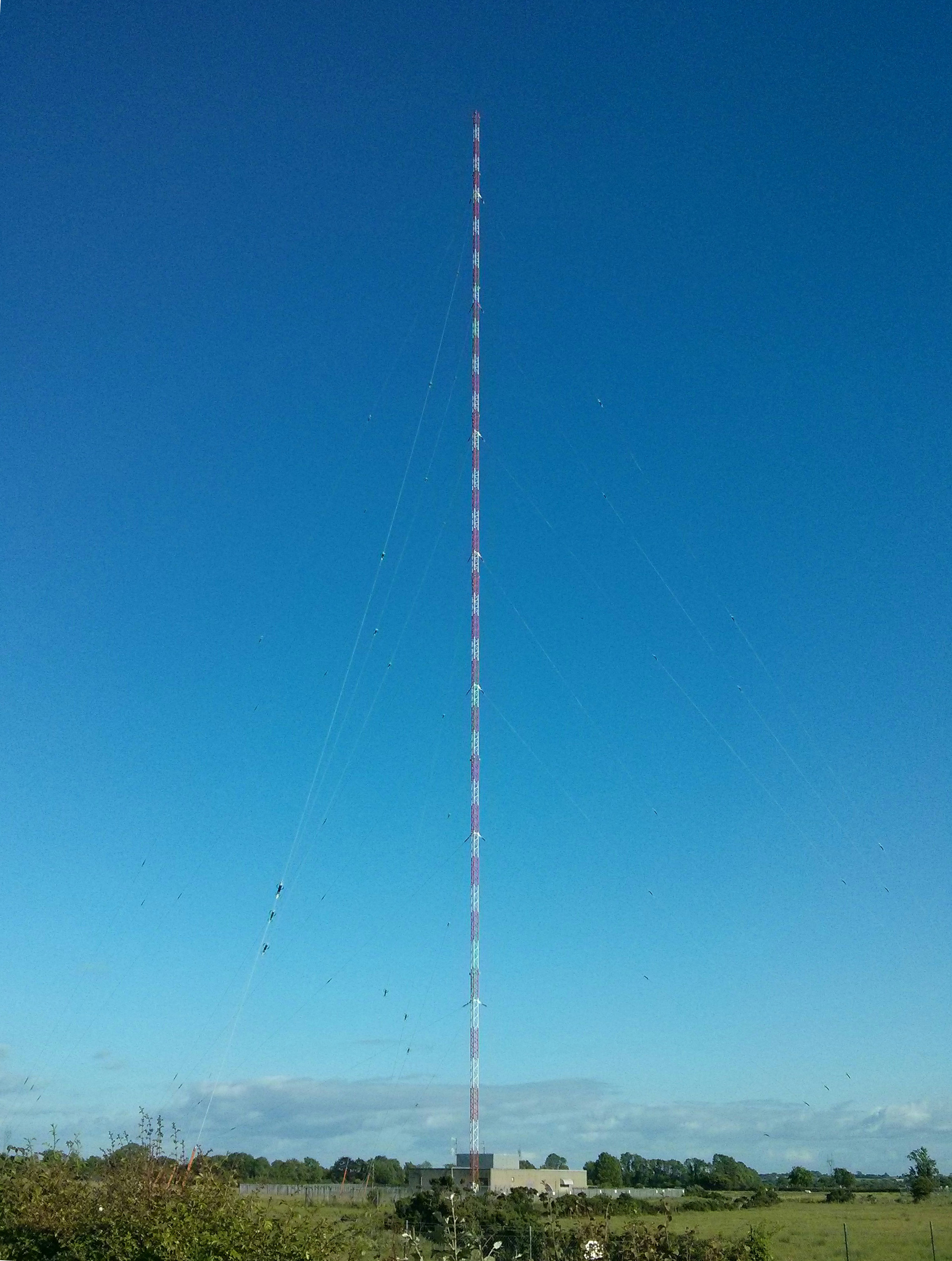
- Ballycommon Radio Mast

- Location in Ireland
- Coordinates: 53°17′28″N 7°22′09″W
- Country: Ireland
- Province: Leinster
- County: Offaly

Ballycommon is a parish and village in County Offaly, Ireland. It is located 10 km east of Tullamore.

== Sport ==
Ballycommon GAA club is located within the village. Ballycommon won the Junior football championship in Offaly in 2017 and are still on the beer.

== Tourism ==
The Kilbeggan - Ballycommon greenway, part of the planned Kilbeggan–Mullingar Greenway, opened in February 2022.

== Ballycommon Civil Parish ==
Ballycommon civil parish comprises 11 townlands: Ballycommon, Ballyteige Big, Ballyteige Little, Bracklin Big, Bracklin Little, Derrygrogan Big, Derrygrogan Little, Fairfield, Kilmurry, Rathdrum and Wood Of O.

== Radio Mast ==
The RTÉ MW transmitter mast at Ballycommon began construction in 1973. It ceased operation on 24 March 2008. On July 25, 2023, the mast was demolished.
