= Richard Chenevix Trench =

Anglican archbishop and poet (1807–1886)

The Right Reverend and Right Honourable Richard Chenevix Trench PC (Ire)
- Archbishop of Dublin; Bishop of Glendalough; Primate of Ireland
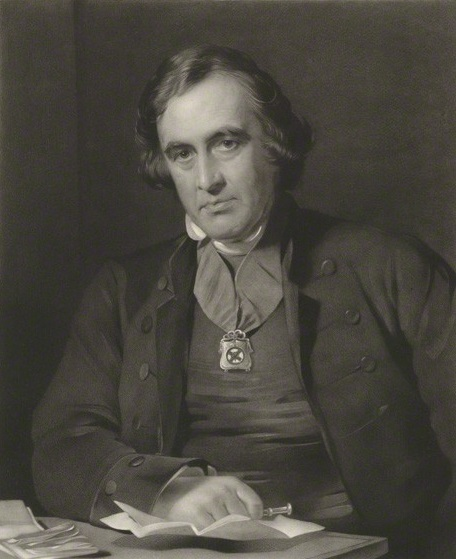
- Church: Church of Ireland
- Province: Dublin
- Diocese: Dublin and Glendalough
- In office: 1864-1884
- Predecessor: Richard Whately
- Successor: William Plunket, 4th Baron Plunket
- Previous post: Dean of Westminster (1856–1864)

Orders
- Ordination: 5 July 1835
- Consecration: 1 January 1864 by Marcus Beresford

Personal details
- Born: 9 September 1807 Dublin, Ireland
- Died: 28 March 1886 (aged 78) Eaton Square, London
- Buried: Westminster Abbey
- Denomination: Anglican
- Spouse: Frances Mary Trench
- Education: Trinity College, Cambridge
- Signature: Richard Chenevix Trench's signature

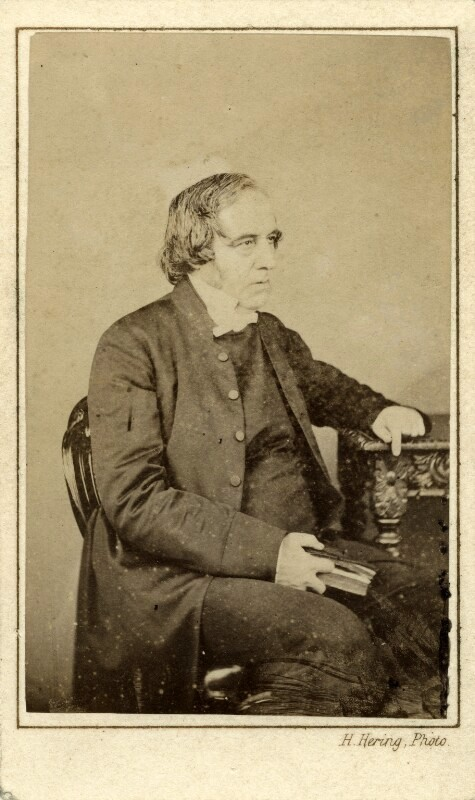
Richard Chenevix Trench circa 1860

Richard Chenevix Trench (9 September 1807 – 28 March 1886) was an Anglican archbishop and poet.

== Life ==
He was born in Dublin, Ireland, the son of Richard Trench (1774–1860), barrister-at-law, and the Dublin writer Melesina Chenevix (1768–1827). His elder brother was Francis Chenevix Trench. He went to school at Harrow, went up to Trinity College, Cambridge, and graduated in 1829. In 1830 he visited Spain. While incumbent of Curdridge Chapel near Bishop's Waltham in Hampshire, he published (1835) The Story of Justin Martyr and Other Poems, which was followed in 1838 by Sabbation, Honor Neale, and other Poems, and in 1842 by Poems from Eastern Sources.

In 1841 he resigned his living to become curate to Samuel Wilberforce, then rector of Alverstoke, and upon Wilberforce's promotion to the deanery of Westminster Abbey in 1845 he was presented to the rectory of Itchenstoke. In 1845 and 1846 he preached the Hulsean lecture, and in the former year was made examining chaplain to Wilberforce, now Bishop of Oxford. He was shortly afterwards appointed to a theological chair at King's College London.

Trench joined the Canterbury Association on 27 March 1848, on the same day as Samuel Wilberforce and Wilberforce's brother Robert.

In 1851 he established his fame as a philologist by The Study of Words, originally delivered as lectures to the pupils of the Diocesan Training School, Winchester. His stated purpose was to demonstrate that in words, even taken singly, "there are boundless stores of moral and historic truth, and no less of passion and imagination laid up". It was followed by two volumes of similar character—English Past and Present (1855) and A Select Glossary of English Words (1859). He read a paper before the Philological Society, On some Deficiencies in our English Dictionaries (1857), which inspired the Oxford English Dictionary. Trench envisaged a dictionary that would be a "lexicon totius Anglicitatis". As one of the three founders of the dictionary, he expressed his vision thus: it would be "an entirely new Dictionary; no patch upon old garments, but a new garment throughout".

In 1856, he published an essay on Calderón, with a translation of a portion of Life is a Dream in the original metre. In 1841 he published his Notes on the Parables of our Lord, and in 1846 his Notes on the Miracles.

Also in 1856, Trench became Dean of Westminster Abbey. He introduced evening nave services to the abbey.

=== Later career and death ===
In January 1864 he was advanced to the post of Archbishop of Dublin. Arthur Penrhyn Stanley had been the first choice, but was rejected by the Irish Church, and, according to Bishop Wilberforce's correspondence, Trench's appointment was favoured by neither the prime minister nor the lord-lieutenant.

He died on 28 March 1886 at Eaton Square, London after a lingering illness, and was buried at Westminster Abbey.

George W. E. Russell described Trench as "a man of singularly vague and dreamy habits".

== Family ==
Richard Chenevix Trench married his cousin, Hon. Frances Mary Trench, daughter of Francis Trench and Mary Mason, and sister of the 2nd Lord Ashtown, on 1 June 1832.

== Works ==
- The Story of Justin Martyr and other Poems (1835)
- Sabbation; Honor Neale, and other Poems (1838)
- Poems (1841)
- Poems from Eastern Sources: the Steadfast Prince, and other Poems (1842)
- Genoveva: a Poem, (1842)
- The Story of Justin Martyr: Sabbation and Other Poems (1844)
- The Fitness of Holy Scripture for Unfolding the Spiritual Life of Man (1845 & 1856)
- Christ the Desire of all Nations: Being The Hulsean Lectures (1846)
- Notes on the Parables of Our Lord (1847)
- Sacred Latin Poetry (1849)
- Notes on the Miracles of Our Lord (1850)
- The Star of the Wise Men (1850)
- Exposition of the Sermon on the Mount (1851)
- Poems from Eastern Sources, Genoveva, and other Poems (1851)
- On the Lessons in Proverbs: Five Lectures (1853)
- On the Study of Words: Five Lectures (1853)
- The Fitness of the Holy Scripture (1854)
- Alma: and Other Poems (1855)
- Calderon, his Life and Genius, with Specimens of his Plays (1856)
- Life's a Dream: The Great Theatre of the World translated from the Spanish of Calderon (1856 & 1860)
- Poems (1856)
- On Some Deficiencies in our English Dictionaries (1857)
- Sermons Preached Before the University of Cambridge (1857)
- On the Authorized Version of the New Testament (1858)
- Brands Plucked Out of the Fire: A Sermon (1858)
- On the English Language, Past and Present: Five Lectures (1858)
- A Select Glossary of English Words (1860)
- Sermons Preached in Westminster Abbey (1860)
- Synonyms of the New Testament (1860)
- Proverbs and their Lessons (1861)
- Commentary on the Epistles to the Seven Churches in Asia: Revelation II, III (1863)
- Every Good Gift from Above (1864)
- Poems: Collected and Arranged Anew (1865)
- Studies in the Gospels (1867)
- A Household Book of English Poetry (1868)
- Plutarch, his life, and his Lives and his Morals (1873)
- Sermons Preached for the Most Part in Ireland (1873)
- Brief Thoughts and Meditations on some Passages in Holy Scripture (1884)
- Lectures on Medieval Church History (1886)
- Sermons New and Old (1886)
- Shipwrecks of Faith: Three Sermons (1886)
- Sonnets and Elegiacs (1910)
- The Study of Words: Condensed by Grenville Kleiser (1911)

== See also ==
- Parables of Jesus
- Miracles of Jesus

== Notes ==
Church of Ireland titles
Preceded by Richard Whately	Archbishop of Dublin; 1864–1884	Succeeded by William Plunket
