= Brian Seeley =

Armagh Gaelic footballer (1933–2024

Brain Seeley
Personal information
- Native name: Brain Ó Saolaí (Irish)
- Born: 1933 Lurgan, County Armagh, Northern Ireland
- Died: 25 August 2024 (aged 90) Moy, County Tyrone, Northern Ireland
- Occupation: Painter
- Height: 6 ft 0 in (183 cm)

Sport
- Sport: Gaelic football
- Position: Centre-forward
Club
- Years: Club
- Clan na Gael
Club titles
- Armagh titles: 3
Inter-county
- Years: County
- Armagh
Inter-county titles
- Ulster titles: 1
- All-Irelands: 0
- NFL: 0

Brian Seeley (1933 – 25 August 2024) was an Irish Gaelic footballer and manager. He played at club level with Clan na Gael and at inter-county level with the Armagh senior football team. Seeley later managed the Clan na Gael team.

== Playing career ==
Seeley first played Gaelic football at juvenile and underage levels with the Clan Óg team. He was only 16-years-old when he won his first Armagh SFC title in 1949, before claiming a second winners' medal in 1950.

Seeley first appeared on the inter-county scene with Armagh with the minor team in 1950. He captained the team to the Ulster MFC title in 1951, before later losing to Roscommon in the All-Ireland MFC final. Seeley also won an Ulster JFC title in 1951, the same year he made his senior team debut. He won an Ulster SFC title in 1953, before losing to Kerry in the subsequent All-Ireland SFC final.

== Coaching career ==
Seeley was player-manager when he won his third and final Armagh SFC title with Clan na Gael in 1969. He later managed the team to three successive Ulster Club SFC titles, while also losing the 1974 All-Ireland Club SFC final to University College Dublin. Seeley guided Clan na Gael to a sixth Armagh SFC title during his tenure in 1976 before stepping down as manager shortly after.

== Death ==
Seeley died on 25 August 2024, at the age of 90.

== Honours ==
=== Player ===
Clan na Gael

- Armagh Senior Football Championship: 1949, 1950, 1969

Down

- Ulster Senior Football Championship: 1953
- Ulster Junior Football Championship: 1951
- Ulster Minor Football Championship: 1951 (c)

=== Manager ===
Clan na Gael

- Ulster Senior Club Football Championship: 1972, 1973, 1974
- Armagh Senior Football Championship: 1969, 1971, 1972, 1973, 1974, 1976
