= Fran Ryder =

Irish Gaelic footballer and coach

Personal information
- Native name: Prionsias Ó Marcaigh (Irish)
- Born: 1954 (age 71–72) Dublin, Ireland
- Occupations: Teacher, publican
- Height: 5 ft 10 in (178 cm)

Sport
- Sport: Gaelic football
- Position: Centre-back
Clubs
- Years: Club
- Ballymun Kickhams; St Vincent's
Club titles
- Dublin titles: 4
- Leinster titles: 1
- All-Ireland Titles: 1
Inter-county
- Years: County
- 1974-1982: Dublin
Inter-county titles
- Leinster titles: 6
- All-Irelands: 3
- NFL: 1

Francis M. "Fran" Ryder (born 1954) is an Irish former Gaelic footballer and coach who played at club level with Ballymun Kickhams and St Vincent's and at inter-county level with the Dublin senior football team. He usually lined out as a centre-back.

== Playing career ==
Ryder began his club career with Ballymun Kickhams before later transferring to St Vincent's. It was with the latter club that he won the All-Ireland Club Championship in 1976. Ryder was a member of the Dublin minor football team, and later won consecutive Leinster Under-21 Championship titles. He was drafted onto the Dublin senior football team in March 1974. Ryder went on to play in six consecutive All-Ireland finals, with victories as a substitute in 1974 and 1977, while his only winners' medal came on the field of play in 1976. His other honours include two National Football League titles.

== Coaching career ==
Ryder spent five years as coach, and later selector, with the Dublin senior team from 1990 to 1995. In that period, Dublin won four consecutive Leinster Championships and the All-Ireland Championship title in 1995.

== Honours ==
=== Player ===
St Vincent's

- All-Ireland Senior Club Football Championship: 1976
- Leinster Senior Club Football Championship: 1975
- Dublin Senior Football Championship: 1975, 1976, 1977, 1981

Dublin

- All-Ireland Senior Football Championship: 1974, 1976, 1977
- Leinster Senior Football Championship: 1974, 1975, 1976, 1977, 1978, 1979
- National Football League: 1975–76, 1977–78
- Leinster Under-21 Football Championship: 1974, 1975

=== Coach ===
Dublin

- All-Ireland Senior Football Championship: 1995
- Leinster Senior Football Championship: 1992, 1993, 1994, 1995
- National Football League: 1990–91, 1992–93
