= JP Kean =

Irish Gaelic footballer

John P Kean, also referred to as JP Kean, is an Irish former Gaelic footballer and hurler who played both codes for Claremorris and football for the Mayo county team.

Kean was team captain when Mayo won the 1971 All-Ireland Minor Football Championship. He first played for the Mayo senior team in 1972, and continued for ten years. He played on Mayo teams that won the 1974 All-Ireland Under-21 Football Championship (scoring 0–8 in the final), and the 1981 Connacht Senior Football Championship.

With Claremorris he won five county championship titles in one year (1971), including dual titles at both minor and senior level: the 1971 Mayo Minor Football Championship, the 1971 Mayo Minor Hurling Championship, the 1971 Mayo Senior Football Championship and the 1971 Mayo Senior Hurling Championship, with the Mayo Under-21 Football Championship as his fifth title of that year. Claremorris later added a Connacht Senior Club Football Championship title. As of 2024, the club had won neither senior county title since that year.

With UCD, Kean won four Sigerson Cup titles and played in two additional finals (a draw and lost replay). The first Sigerson title came in 1973, followed by 1974, 1975 and 1977. The lost final was in 1976, coinciding with Kean's tenure as captain. He played the full games from 1973 until 1976, but – injured – was unable to begin the 1977 final, restricted to a substitute appearance. Kean was also part of the UCD team that won both the 1973 and 1974 Dublin Senior Football Championships, as well as both the 1974 and 1975 All-Ireland Senior Club Football Championships.

He played for the Tuam Stars club because Tuam, in County Galway, was where he was working as a solicitor. He was manager when Mayo's minor footballers won five Connacht Minor Football Championships (1996–2002). The media has asked his "expert" view on team matters. In 2019, he publicly criticised the Mayo County Board for its sidelining of the 2011 Strategic Action Plan, and also criticised the team's former players (apart from Kevin McStay) for, he believed, staying silent on that issue.
