= 1979 All-Ireland Under-21 Football Championship =

Gaelic football competition

Championship details

All-Ireland Champions
- Winning team: Down (1st win)
- Captain: Ned King

All-Ireland Finalists
- Losing team: Cork

Provincial Champions
- Munster: Cork
- Leinster: Offaly
- Ulster: Down
- Connacht: Galway

The 1979 All-Ireland Under-21 Football Championship was the 16th staging of the All-Ireland Under-21 Football Championship since its establishment by the Gaelic Athletic Association in 1964.

Roscommon entered the championship as defending champions, however, they were defeated in the Connacht Championship.

On 23 September 1979, Down won the championship following a 1-9 to 0-7 defeat of Cork in the All-Ireland final. This was their first All-Ireland title.

The final was refereed by Gerry Mc Cabe from Clonoe in Co Tyrone

== Results ==
=== Leinster Under-21 Football Championship ===
15 July Final	Offaly	4-14 - 5-04	Louth	Páirc Tailteann, Navan
	Connor 2-3, Owens 0-6, B. Lowry 1-3, Scally 1-0, Henry 0-1, Currams 0-1		Lennon 1-1, Lynch 1-1, Short 1-0, Wiseman 1-0, Judge 1-0, Carroll 0-1, McDonnell 0-1	Referee: P. Kavanagh (Meath)

GK	1	Noel Fitzpatrick (Bracknagh)
RCB	2	Michael Darby (Rhode)
FB	3	Ernie McGuire (Tullamore)
LCB	4	Joe Slevin (Na Piarsaigh)
RHB	5	Larry Lynam (Tullamore)
CHB	6	Christy McGlynn (Edenderry)
LHB	7	Mick Lowry (Ferbane)
MF	8	Johnny Mooney (Rhode)
MF	9	Gerry Carroll (Edenderry)
RHF	10	Liam Currams (Na Piarsaigh)
CHF	11	Vincent Henry (Clara)
LHF	12	Ollie Scally (Ballycommon)
RCF	13	Brendan Lowry (Ferbane) (c)
FF	14	Matt Connor (Walsh Island)
LCF	15	Danny Owens (Na Piarsaigh)
Substitutes:
	16	Pat Maher (Ferbane) for McGuire
	17	Niall O'Dea (Tullamore) for Slevin

GK	1	Michael Ward (Mattock Rangers)
RCB	2	Paul Matthews (Newtown Blues)
FB	3	Brendan Byrne (St Mochta's)
LCB	4	Ray Faulkner (Newtown Blues)
RHB	5	Gary O'Callaghan (Clan na Gael)
CHB	6	Aidan Wiseman (Clan na Gael)
LHB	7	Noel Cluskey (Seán McDermott's)
MF	8	Jim Lynch (Kilkerley Emmets)
MF	9	Frank Short (Naomh Malachi)
RHF	10	Jimmy McDonnell (Geraldines)
CHF	11	Eugene Judge (Newtown Blues)
LHF	12	Seán Reid (Mattock Rangers)
RCF	13	Kevin Carroll (Seán McDermott's)
FF	14	Paul Reneghan (Geraldines)
LCF	15	Pat Lennon (Kilkerley Emmets) (c)
Substitutes:
	16	Jim Tenanty (St Mary's) for Faulkner
	17	Paddy Matthews (Oliver Plunketts) for Cluskey
	18	Seán McGahon (Seán McDermott's) for Lynch

=== All-Ireland Under-21 Football Championship ===
Semi-finals

26 August 1979 Semi-final	Cork	1-08 - 1-07	Offaly	Páirc Uí Chaoimh, Cork

26 August 1979 Semi-final	Down	0-11 - 0-09	Galway	Páirc Esler, Newry

Final

23 September 1979 Final	Down	1-09 - 0-07	Cork	Croke Park, Dublin

== Statistics ==
=== Miscellaneous ===
- The All-Ireland semi-final between Cork and Offaly is the first ever championship meeting between the two teams.
- The All-Ireland final between Cork and Down is the first ever championship meeting between the two teams.
