= Ivan Heffernan =

Irish Gaelic footballer

Ivan Heffernan is an Irish former Gaelic footballer who played as a goalkeeper for Ballina Stephenites, as well as the Mayo county team, which he captained. He is originally from Ballina, County Mayo.

Heffernan was goalkeeper on the Mayo team that won the 1974 All-Ireland Under-21 Football Championship. He was Mayo captain for the Connacht Senior Football Championship.

Heffernan also played for UCD during the 1970s. He was goalkeeper on the UCD team that won the 1974 All-Ireland Senior Club Football Championship title. He also won two Sigerson Cup titles.

Heffernan's family have made several contributions to sport. A son, Dave, plays rugby union for Connacht. Ballina R.F.C.'s pitch is named after his father. A brother Niall also played for Mayo, managed Ballina Stephenites to several Mayo Senior Football Championship titles and managed the Mayo under-20 football team.

Heffernan also played rugby union, and captained Ballina R.F.C. to the 1985 Connacht Junior Cup and Connacht Junior League. He was later appointed as Ballina's Director of Rugby for the 1st and 2nd XVs. In 2017, the club appointed him to its management team.
