= Kevin Kilmurray =

Irish Gaelic footballer (1950–2022)

Personal information
- Native name: Caoimhín Mac Giolla Mhuire (Irish)
- Born: 1950 Daingean, County Offaly, Ireland
- Died: 4 December 2022 (aged 72) Dublin, Ireland
- Height: 6 ft 0 in (183 cm)

Sport
- Sport: Gaelic football
- Position: Centre-forward
Clubs
- Years: Club
- Daingean; University College Dublin; St Brigid's; Civil Service
Club titles
- Dublin titles: 3
- Leinster titles: 2
- All-Ireland Titles: 2
College
- Years: College
- University College Dublin
College titles
- Sigerson titles: 2
Inter-county
Years	County	Apps (scores)
1969–1982	Offaly	31
Inter-county titles
- Leinster titles: 5
- All-Irelands: 2
- NFL: 0
- All Stars: 2

Kevin Kilmurray (1950 – 4 December 2022) was an Irish Gaelic footballer who played for his local club Daingean and at senior level for the Offaly county team from 1969 until 1980.

Kilmurray was from Daingean, County Offaly.

He managed the Offaly senior football team from November 2004 until 2006. Kilmurray had two championship seasons in charge, most notably steering Offaly to the 2006 Leinster SFC final. That remained Offaly's most recent appearance there at the time of his death.

Kilmurray's death was announced on 4 December 2022; he had reached the age of 72. He was the fifth member of the 1971–72 Offaly team to die, following Larry Coughlan, Kieran Claffey, Mick O'Rourke and Paddy Fenning.

== Honours ==
Belcamp College

- Leinster Colleges Senior Football Championship: 1967, 1968

University College Dublin

- All-Ireland Senior Club Football Championship: 1974, 1975
- Leinster Senior Club Football Championship: 1973, 1974
- Dublin Senior Football Championship: 1973, 1974
- Sigerson Cup: 1973, 974

Civil Service

- Dublin Senior Football Championship: 1980

Offaly

- All-Ireland Senior Football Championship: 1971, 1972
- Leinster Senior Football Championship: 1969, 1971, 1972, 1973, 1980
- Leinster Under-21 Football Championship: 1971
