= 1978 All-Ireland Under-21 Football Championship =

Gaelic football competition

Championship details

All-Ireland Champions
- Winning team: Roscommon (2nd win)
- Captain: Séamus Hayden

All-Ireland Finalists
- Losing team: Kerry
- Captain: Vincent O'Connor

Provincial Champions
- Munster: Kerry
- Leinster: Louth
- Ulster: Down
- Connacht: Roscommon

The 1978 All-Ireland Under-21 Football Championship was the 15th staging of the All-Ireland Under-21 Football Championship since its establishment by the Gaelic Athletic Association in 1964.

Kerry entered the championship as defending champions in search of a record-breaking fourth successive All-Ireland title.

On 15 October 1978, Roscommon won the championship following a 1–9 to 1–8 defeat of Kerry in the All-Ireland final. This was their second All-Ireland title overall and their first in 12 championship seasons.

== Results ==
=== Connacht Under-21 Football Championship ===
| Final | Roscommon | 3-09 - 2-11 | Galway |

=== Leinster Under-21 Football Championship ===
| 23 July 1978 Final | Louth | 2-08 - 2-07 | Offaly | Croke Park, Dublin |
| | P. Lennon 1-1, Jimmy McDonnell 0-4, D. Kelleher 1-0, E. Judge 0-1, Johnny McDonnell 0-1, P. Matthews 0-1 | | J. Dunne 1-3, L. Dunne 1-1, T. Fitzgerald 0-2, D. Owens 0-1 | Referee: Paul Kelly (Dublin) |

| GK | 1 | Mal Clarke (Oliver Plunketts) |
| RCB | 2 | Paul Matthews (Newtown Blues) |
| FB | 3 | Séamus Haughey (Dundalk Young Irelands) |
| LCB | 4 | Brendan Byrne (St Mochta's) (c) |
| RHB | 5 | Gary O'Callaghan (Clan na Gael) |
| CHB | 6 | Benny McArdle (Dundalk Gaels) |
| LHB | 7 | Pat Lynch (Dreadnots) |
| MF | 8 | Michael McCabe (Dundalk Young Irelands) |
| MF | 9 | Larry Goodman (Dundalk Young Irelands) |
| RHF | 10 | Eugene Judge (Newtown Blues) |
| CHF | 11 | Jimmy McDonnell (Geraldines) |
| LHF | 12 | Seán Reid (Mattock Rangers) |
| RCF | 13 | Pat Lennon (Kilkerley Emmets) |
| FF | 14 | Denis Kelleher (Dreadnots) |
| LCF | 15 | Johnny McDonnell (St Fechin's) |
Substitutes:
| | 16 | Aidan Wiseman (Clan na Gael) for McCabe |

| GK | 1 | Pat Coyne (Na Piarsaigh) |
| RCB | 2 | Niall O'Dea (Tullamore) |
| FB | 3 | Ollie Minnock (Clara) |
| LCB | 4 | Pat Grady (Daingean) |
| RHB | 5 | Pat Dolan (St Mary's) |
| CHB | 6 | Gerry Carroll (Edenderry) |
| LHB | 7 | Ger Higgins (Bracknagh) |
| MF | 8 | Thomas Connor (Walsh Island) |
| MF | 9 | Johnny Mooney (Rhode) |
| RHF | 10 | Jimmy Dunne (Na Piarsaigh) |
| CHF | 11 | Vincent Henry (Clara) |
| LHF | 12 | Tom Fitzpatrick (Bracknagh) |
| RCF | 13 | Liam Dunne (Gracefield) |
| FF | 14 | Matt Connor (Walsh Island) |
| LCF | 15 | Mickey White (Tullamore) |
Substitutes:
| | 16 | Danny Owens (Na Piarsaigh) for White |
| | 17 | Martin Dunne (St Mary's) for Dolan |
| | 18 | Brendan Lowry (Ferbane) for Fitzpatrick |

=== Ulster Under-21 Football Championship ===
| Final | Down | 0-11 - 1-06 | Cavan |

=== Munster Under-21 Football Championship ===
| Final | Kerry | 0-14 - 0-09 | Cork |

=== All-Ireland Under-21 Football Championship ===
Semi-finals

| 10 September 1978 Semi-final | Roscommon | 0-08 - 0-07 | Down | Dr. Hyde Park, Roscommon |

| 1 October 1978 Semi-final | Louth | 0-14 - 2-10 | Kerry | Gaelic Grounds, Drogheda |

Final

| 15 October 1978 Final | Roscommon | 1-09 - 1-08 | Kerry | Dr. Hyde Park, Roscommon |
| | | | | Referee: S. Murray (Monaghan) |

== Statistics ==
=== Miscellaneous ===
- The All-Ireland semi-final between Kerry and Louth was originally fixed for 27 August 1978, however, Kerry disclosed to the GAA authorities that they would not be fielding a team as several of their players were also involved with the senior team in the All-Ireland final. Louth were declared the winners of that tie and were given a place in the All-Ireland final, however, an appeal by Kerry saw the game refixed. The refixture ended in dramatic circumstances as the score appeared to be level at the end of normal time, however, the referee later stated that Kerry had won by two points.
