= 1976 All-Ireland Under-21 Football Championship =

Association football competition

Championship details

All-Ireland Champions
- Winning team: Kerry (4th win)
- Captain: Gerry Murphy
- Manager: Mick O'Dwyer

All-Ireland Finalists
- Losing team: Kildare

Provincial Champions
- Munster: Kerry
- Leinster: Kildare
- Ulster: Derry
- Connacht: Mayo

The 1976 All-Ireland Under-21 Football Championship was the 13th staging of the All-Ireland Under-21 Football Championship since its establishment by the Gaelic Athletic Association in 1964.

Kerry entered the championship as defending champions.

On 12 September 1976, Kerry won the championship following a 0-14 to 1-3 defeat of Kildare in the All-Ireland final. This was their fourth All-Ireland title overall and their second in successive championship seasons.

== Results ==
=== All-Ireland Under-21 Football Championship ===
Semi-finals

15 August 1976 Semi-final	Kildare	2-12 - 1-10	Derry	St. Conleth's Park, Newbridge

15 August 1976 Semi-final	Kerry	1-12 - 2-07	Mayo	Austin Stack Park, Tralee

Final

12 September 1976 Final	Kerry	0-14 - 1-03	Kildare	Ned Hall Park, Clonmel

== Statistics ==
=== Miscellaneous ===
- The All-Ireland semi-final between Kildare and Derry is the first championship meeting between the two teams.
