= 1977 All-Ireland Under-21 Football Championship =

Ali game

Championship details

All-Ireland Champions
- Winning team: Kerry (5th win)
- Captain: Denis "Ógie" Moran
- Manager: Mick O'Dwyer

All-Ireland Finalists
- Losing team: Down

Provincial Champions
- Munster: Kerry
- Leinster: Offaly
- Ulster: Down
- Connacht: Leitrim

The 1977 All-Ireland Under-21 Football Championship was the 14th staging of the All-Ireland Under-21 Football Championship since its establishment by the Gaelic Athletic Association in 1964.

Kerry entered the championship as defending champions.

On 2 October 1977, Kerry won the championship following a 1-11 to 1-5 defeat of Down in the All-Ireland final. This was their fifth All-Ireland title overall and their third in successive championship seasons.

== Results ==
=== All-Ireland Under-21 Football Championship ===
Semi-finals

28 August 1977 Semi-final	Kerry	3-13 - 3-08	Leitrim	Páirc Seán Mac Diarmada, Carrick

28 August 1977 Semi-final	Down	1-06 - 0-09	Offaly	Páirc Esler, Newry

11 September 1977 Semi-final replay	Offaly	0-09 - 2-08	Down	O'Connor Park, Tullamore

Final

2 October 1977 Final	Kerry	1-11 - 1-05	Down	Croke Park, Dublin

== Statistics ==
=== Miscellaneous ===
- Leitrim win the Connacht title for the first time in their history, after defeating Roscommon.
- Kerry become the first team to win three successive All-Ireland titles.
