= 2026 All-Ireland Under-20 Football Championship =

Gaelic football championship

Championship details
- Dates: 14 March – May 2026
- Teams: 31

All-Ireland Champions
- Winning team: Kerry (11th win)
- Captain: Paddy Lane
- Manager: Tomás Ó Sé

All-Ireland Finalists
- Losing team: Tyrone
- Captain: Conor Devlin
- Manager: Paul Devlin

Provincial Champions
- Munster: Kerry
- Leinster: Kildare
- Ulster: Tyrone
- Connacht: Roscommon

Championship statistics
- No. matches played: 79
- Goals total: 214
- Points total: 2,238
- Top Scorer: Shea McDermott 5-37 (52)
- Player of the Year: Gearóid White

The 2026 All-Ireland Under-20 Football Championship is the eighth staging of the All-Ireland Under-20 Championship and the 63rd staging overall of a Gaelic football championship for players between the minor and senior grades. The championship is scheduled to run from 14 March to May 2026.

Tyrone were defending champions, having claimed the last two titles. However they were defeated in the All-Ireland Final by Kerry on a scoreline of 0-21 to 1-10 as the Kingdom claimed their first title at the grade since 2008.

== Connacht Championship ==
=== Connacht Group Stage ===
Pos	Team	Pld	W	D	L	SF	SA	Diff	Pts	Qualification
1	Mayo	4	4	0	0	93	63	+30	8	Advance to Final
2	Galway	4	3	0	1	67	65	+2	6	Advance to Semi-Final
3	Roscommon	4	2	0	2	76	69	+7	4	Advance to Semi-Final
4	Sligo	4	1	0	3	59	74	-15	2	
5	Leitrim	4	0	0	4	51	75	-24	0	

==== Connacht Group Stage Matches ====
Round 1

18 March 2026 Round 1	Galway	3–10 (19) – 1–11 (14)	Roscommon	Tuam
	Pts: M Collins 1–2, C Mulhern 0–4, C Mitchell 1–0, S McGlinchey 1–0, M Mulryan 0–2, R Coen 0–1, K Joyce 0–1		Pts: J Curran 1–3, C McKeon 0–2, N Heneghan 0–2, D Casey 0–1, C Murray 0–1, C O’Carroll 0–1, J McGuinness 0–1

18 March 2026 Round 1	Sligo	0–15 (15) – 0–17 (17)	Mayo	Tubbercurry
	Pts: E Rooney (3 2p) 0–11, D Mostyn 0–1, M Walsh 0–1, E O’Mahony 0–1, C Lynch 0–1		Pts: D Beirne (3f) 0–5, T Lydon 0–4, O Deane (2p) 0–3, K McDonald (‘45’) 0–2, C Lynch 0–1, J Lavelle 0–1, S Cunningham 0–1

Round 2

25 March 2026 Round 2	Roscommon	2–19 (25) – 0–15 (15)	Sligo	Roscommon
	Pts: C O’Carroll 0–8, C Murray 1–2, J Curran 0–4, E Collins 1–0, C Grogan 0–2, J McGuinness 0–1, R Kilcline 0–1, E Carthy 0–1		Pts: E Rooney 0–6, E O’Mahony 0–4, C Nicholson 0–2, A Lang 0–1, M Carroll 0–1, E Keane 0–1

25 March 2026 Round 2	Leitrim	0–11 (11) – 2–11 (17)	Galway	Bekan
	Pts: P Honeyman (2 tpf) 0–4, J Kelly (1f) 0–3, R Fox 0–2, A Gethins 0–1, E McNamara 0–1		Pts: C Mulhern 1–1, R Coen 0–2, E Ó Cualáin 0–2, M Mulryan (2f) 0–2, M Ó Domhnaill 0–2, K Joyce 0–1

Round 3

1 April 2026 Round 3	Sligo	1–11 (14) – 0–12 (12)	Leitrim	Tubbercurry
18:30
	Pts: E O’Mahony 0–3, M Walsh 1–0, C Walsh 0–2, A Feeney 0–2, A Lang 0–1, C Gilligan 0–1, G Cummins (‘45’) 0–1		Pts: P Honeyman 0–8, E McNamara 0–1, J Kelly 0–1, R O’Rourke 0–1, F McManus 0–1

1 April 2026 Round 3	Mayo	2–16 (22) – 1–15 (18)	Roscommon	Castlebar
19:00
	Pts: O Deane 0–6, D Beirne 0–6, K McDonald 0–5, T Lydon 0–2, J Holmes 0–2, C Lynch 0–1		Pts: D Casey 0–5, C O’Carroll 0–4, J Curran 0–4, E Carthy 0–2, R Kilcline 0–2, J McGuinness 0–1

Round 4

8 April 2026 Round 4	Galway	1–13 (16) – 0–15 (15)	Sligo	Tuam
18:30
	Pts: E Ó Cualáin 1–1, R Coen 0–3, C Mulhern 0–2, S McGlinchey 0–2, M Collins 0–2, M Mulryan 0–2, K Joyce 0–1		Pts: A Lang 0–4, A Feeney 0–3, C Nicholson 0–2, E O’Mahony 0–2, C Walsh 0–1, E Keane 0–1, M Walsh 0–1, O Devlin 0–1

8 April 2026 Round 4	Leitrim	1–12 (15) – 3–20 (29)	Mayo	Carrick-on-Shannon
18:30
	Pts: P Honeyman 0–8, C McLoughlin 1–0, R Fox 0–2, B McBride 0–2		Pts: T Lydon 0–7, K McDonald 1–3, D Beirne 1–2, C Lynch (2 2p) 0–5, D Flynn 1–1, R Mortimer 0–2, N Roddy 0–1

Round 5

15 April 2026 Round 5	Mayo	3–16 (25) – 1–12 (15)	Galway	Castlebar
19:00
	Pts: K McDonald (2p) 2–3, D Beirne (tpf, 2p, 2f) 0–6, O Deane 0–3, D Flynn 1–0, J Holmes (2p) 0–2		Pts: M Mulryan (2 tpf, 2f) 1–7, C Mulhern (1f) 0–2, R Coen 0–1, M Collins 0–1, C Mitchell 0–1

15 April 2026 Round 5	Roscommon	3–06 (15) – 2–07 (13)	Leitrim	Roscommon
19:00
	Pts: J Curran 2–4, J McGuinness 1–1, K Kelly 0–1		Pts: C McLoughlin 1–0, F McManus 1–0, J Kelly 0–3, P Honeyman 0–1, R Fox 0–1, R O’Rourke 0–1, A Gethins 0–1

=== Connacht 'B' Final ===
24 April 2026 'B' Final	Leitrim	1-11 (14) – (18) 1-15	Sligo	Cloone
19:00

=== Connacht Knockout Stage ===
==== Connacht Semi-Final ====
22 April 2026 Semi-Final	Galway	0–15 (15) – 2–10 (16)	Roscommon	Castlebar
	Pts: M Mulryan (2p, 1f) 0–5, R Coen 0–3, C Mulhern (1f) 0–1, B O’Malley 0–1, E Ó Cualáin 0–1, M Collins 0–1, R McGrath 0–1		Pts: R Kilcline 1–2, C O’Carroll (4f) 0–4, J McGuinness 1–0, C Grogan 0–2, C McKeon 0–1, E Collins 0–1

==== Connacht Final ====
29 April 2026 Final	Mayo	2–22 (28) – 5–16 (31) (a.e.t.)	Roscommon	Tuam
	Pts: K McDonald (2p, '45') 1–7, T Lydon 1–4, D Beirne 0–4, C Lynch 0–2, J Moyles 0–1, J Holmes 0–1, D Flynn 0–1, C Walsh 0–1		Pts: R Kilcline 2–0, J Curran 1–2, J McGuinness 1–1, E Carthy (2p, tpf) 0–4, K Hester 1–0, D Casey (1f) 0–3, N Heneghan 0–2, K Kelly 0–1, P Gaynor ('45') 0–1, C O’Carroll (1f) 0–1

== Leinster Championship ==
=== Leinster Group 1 ===
Pos	Team	Pld	W	D	L	SF	SA	Diff	Pts	Qualification
1	Louth	3	3	0	0	61	44	+17	6	Advance to Semi-Finals
2	Westmeath	3	2	0	1	50	55	-5	4	Advance to Quarter-Finals
3	Dublin	3	1	0	2	56	59	-3	2	
4	Wexford	3	0	0	3	49	58	-9	0	

==== Leinster Group 1 Matches ====
Round 1

25 March 2026 Round 1	Wexford	1–15 (18) – 1–18 (21)	Dublin	Wexford
	Pts: B Ivers (2p) 0–7, C Kehoe 1–3, D Shannon (2p) 0–2, R Gilbert 0–1, S Reddy 0–1, D Forde 0–1		Pts: L O’Boyle 1–1, B Shouldice 0–2, C O’Dwyer 0–2, O Costello 0–2, C Campion 0–2, F McGinniss 0–2, L Cahill 0–1, D Lynch 0–1, C Emmett 0–1, C O’Connor 0–1, A Carolan 0–1, R Mitchell 0–1, R Doherty 0–1

27 March 2026 Round 1	Westmeath	2–05 (11) – 3–13 (22)	Louth	Mullingar
	Pts: D Maguire 1–0, S Whittacker 1–0, T Slevin (1f) 0–1, N Pierson 0–1, M Thornton 0–1, J McHugh (1f) 0–1, B Ronan 0–1		Pts: S Lennon 2–1, P Grimes-Murphy 1–1, A Gillespie (4f) 0–4, T Devaney 0–3, C McQuillan (1f) 0–1, C McGinty 0–1

Round 2

1 April 2026 Round 2	Dublin	1–13 (16) – 2–13 (19)	Louth	Dublin
	Pts: C O’Dwyer 0–5, D Magee 1–2, R Doherty (2p) 0–2, C Hickey 0–1, L O’Boyle 0–1, O Costello 0–1, R Mitchell 0–1		Pts: A Gillespie (pen, 2f) 1–2, P Tinnelly 1–0, A O’Reilly 0–2, P Grimes-Murphy 0–2, T McDonnell 0–2, C MacCriosta 0–1, S Flynn 0–1

1 April 2026 Round 2	Wexford	2–08 (14) – 1–14 (17)	Westmeath	Wexford
	Pts: B Ivers 1–6, Z Hernan 1–0, A Carton 0–1, D Forde 0–1		Pts: W Scahill 1–2, J McHugh 0–4, C Rochford 0–3, T Slevin 0–2, B Doyle 0–1, H Duncan 0–1, C Ormsby 0–1

Round 3

8 April 2026 Round 3	Louth	1–17 (20) – 3–08 (17)	Wexford	Darver
	Pts: A O’Reilly 0–6, T McDonnell 0–6, E McCoy 0–4, C MacCriosta 0–3, D Skinnader 0–1		Pts: D Harris 0–4, J Rothwell 0–3, K Connolly 0–3, B Ivers 0–3, B Roban 0–1, C Kehoe 0–1

8 April 2026 Round 3	Westmeath	2–16 (22) – 2–13 (19)	Dublin	Kinnegad

=== Leinster Group 2 ===
Pos	Team	Pld	W	D	L	SF	SA	Diff	Pts	Qualification
1	Meath	3	3	0	0	79	37	+42	6	Advance to Semi-Finals
2	Longford	3	2	0	1	61	58	+3	4	Advance to Quarter-Finals
3	Laois	3	1	0	2	54	67	-13	2	
4	Carlow	3	0	0	2	54	86	-32	0	

==== Leinster Group 2 Matches ====
Round 1

25 March 2026 Round 1	Carlow	2–09 (15) – 5–19 (34)	Meath	Carlow
	Pts: J Nolan 1–5, M Buggy (2f) 0–4, D Bolger 0–1		Pts: J Harkin (2f) 2–5, A Ducie 2–0, C Commons (2p) 1–3, S Cahill 0–4, M McIvor (2p) 0–2, C O’Donoghue 0–1, C Smith 0–1

25 March 2026 Round 1	Laois	1–15 (18) – 2–17 (23)	Longford	Portlaoise
	Pts: D Brennan 1–3, E Byrne 0–4, P Fitzpatrick 0–2, D McGrath 0–2, D Donohue 0–1, E Johnson 0–1, D Murphy 0–1, U Dunne 0–1		Pts: L Donnelly 1–4, J Hagan 0–4, P Mollahan 0–4, J Dorr 0–3, M Cooney 0–3, C Flynn 0–1, W McEntire 0–1

Round 2

1 April 2026 Round 2	Longford	2–20 (26) – 1–13 (16)	Carlow	Clonguish
	Pts: L Donnelly 1–5, J Hagan 0–5, C Flynn 1–1, P Mollahan 0–4, P Farrell 0–2, C McHugh 0–1, W McEntire 0–1, J Dorr 0–1		Pts: J Nolan 0–5, E Ryan 0–4, J Coakley 1–0, M Mulhall 0–2, M Buggy 0–1, C Crawford 0–1

1 April 2026 Round 2	Meath	3–12 (21) – 0–10 (10)	Laois	Donaghmore Ashbourne
	Pts: C O’Donoghue 1–2, B Corkery 1–1, J Harkin 0–3, P Crowley 0–3, C Commons 0–1, C Smith 0–1, L Jennings 0–1, S Cahill 0–1, E McCrudden 0–1, P Hennessy 0–1		Pts: E Byrne 0–4, U Dunne 0–2, B O’Connor 0–2, C O’Callaghan 0–1, E Johnson 0–1

Round 3

8 April 2026 Round 3	Longford	0–12 (12) – 3–15 (24)	Meath	Clonguish
	Pts: P Mollahan 0–6, L Donnelly 0–2, C Flynn 0–1, J Hagan 0–1, M Gallagher 0–1, S Fagan 0–1		Pts: C Commons 0–5, J Harkin 0–3, C Scanlon 0–3, B Corkery 0–2, C Smith 0–2, P Hennessy 0–2, S Delaney 0–1, S Cahill 0–1, E McCrudden 0–1, C O’Donoghue 0–1

8 April 2026 Round 3	Laois	3–17 (26) – 2–17 (23)	Carlow	Portlaoise

=== Leinster Group 3 ===
Pos	Team	Pld	W	D	L	SF	SA	Diff	Pts	Qualification
1	Kildare	2	2	0	0	45	24	+21	4	Advance to Quarter-Finals
2	Offaly	2	1	0	1	33	31	+2	2	Advance to Quarter-Finals
3	Wicklow	2	0	0	2	20	43	-23	0	

==== Leinster Group 3 Matches ====
Round 1

25 March 2026 Round 1	Wicklow	0–09 (9) – 3–16 (25)	Kildare	An Tóchar
	Pts: O Murphy 0–3, E Nolan 0–2, P Small 0–2, C Doody 0–1, R Harrison 0–1		Pts: R Kelly 2–4, C Moran 0–4, T.J. Nolan 0–4, J Lynch 1–1, C Keaveney 0–1, D Colbert 0–1, R Lawlor 0–1

Round 2

1 April 2026 Round 2	Kildare	1–17 (20) – 1–12 (15)	Offaly	Hawkfield
	Pts: C Moran (2p, 1f) 1–3, R Kelly (2 tpf, 1f) 0–5, T.J. Nolan 0–3, E Cowzer (2p) 0–3, R Lawlor (2p) 0–2, H Redmond 0–1		Pts: J Ryan (4 tpf, 1f) 0–9, K Bryan (1f) 0–2, J Maher 0–1

Round 3

8 April 2026 Round 3	Offaly	0–18 (18) – 2–05 (11)	Wicklow	Tullamore
	Pts: C McNamee 0–5, J Ryan 0–4, C Foran 0–4, E Rouse 0–2, C Egan 0–1, D Dunne 0–1, K Bryan 0–1		Pts: J O’Leary 2–0, E Nolan 0–1, R Harrison 0–1, T Tisdall 0–1, L Toomey 0–1, J Kindlon 0–1

=== Leinster Tier 2 ===
8 April 2026 Semi-Final	Laois	3-17 (26) – (23) 2-17	Carlow	Portlaoise
19:30				Venue: Laois Hire O'Moore Park

15 April 2026 Semi-Final	Wexford	1-13 (16) – (6) 0-06	Wicklow	Enniscorthy
19:30				Venue: St Patrick's Park

24 April 2026 Final	Wexford	2-13 (19) – (15) 1-12	Laois	Wexford
19:30				Venue: Chadwicks Wexford Park

=== Leinster Knockout Stage ===
Quarter-Finals
23 April, Mullingar
Westmeath	2-12
Kildare	1-20
15 April, Clonguish
Longford	3-13
Offaly	1-17

Semi-Finals
29 April, Newbridge
Kildare	1-20
Meath	2-15
26 April, Longford
Louth	0-18
Longford	0-07

U20 Leinster Final
6 May, Dublin
Louth	1-18
Kildare	0-23

==== Leinster Quarter-Finals ====
Leinster Quarter-Finals

23 April 2026 Quarter-Final	Westmeath	2–12 (18) – 1–20 (23)	Kildare	Mullingar
	Pts: W Scahill 0–8, C Rochford 0–3, D Maguire 0–3, M Thornton 0–2, B Doyle 0–1, K Connell 0–1		Pts: R Kelly 1–7, J Lynch 0–8, B Ryan 0–2, C Moran 0–1, E Cowzer 0–1, H Redmond 0–1

15 April 2026 Quarter-Final	Longford	3–13 (22) – 1–17 (20)	Offaly	Clonguish
	Pts: C Flynn (2p) 1–3, L Donnelly (2p) 0–4, P Mollaghan (1f) 1–1, M Gallagher 1–0, J Hagan 0–1, K Baskett 0–1, C O’Donnell (1f) 0–1, P Farrell 0–1, J Dorr 0–1		Pts: J Ryan (tpf, ‘45’) 0–4, K Bryan (3f) 0–4, D Dunne 1–1, C McNamee 0–3, J Maher 0–1, C Duffy 0–1, E Rouse 0–1, C Egan 0–1

Leinster Semi-Finals

26 April 2026 Semi-Final	Longford	0–07 (7) – 0–18 (18)	Louth	Longford
	Pts: L Donnelly (2 tpf) 0–4, P Mollaghan (1f) 0–1, J Hagan (1f) 0–1, C Flynn 0–1		Pts: T McDonnell (2p, 3f) 0–6, P Grimes-Murphy 0–3, C MacCriosta 0–3, T Devaney 0–2, T Markey (tpf) 0–2, S Flynn 0–1

29 April 2026 Semi-Final	Kildare	1–20 (23) – 2–15 (21)	Meath	Newbridge
	Pts: J Lynch (1f, ‘45’, pen) 1–8, L Kenny 0–3, D Colbert 0–2, E Boyle 0–1, L Kelly 0–1, R Lawlor 0–1, R Kelly (1f) 0–1		Pts: J Harkin (2 tpf, 2f) 0–6, C Scanlon 1–1, C O’Donoghue 1–1, C Commons (2p) 0–4, B Corkery 0–1, S Carroll 0–1, C Smith 0–1

Leinster Final

6 May 2026 Final	Louth	1–18 (21) – 0–23 (23)	Kildare	Dublin
19:30		(HT: 1–08 – 0–12)		Venue: Parnell Park
	Pts: A Gillespie 1–4 (1 tp), T Markey 0–5 (2 tpf, 1 ‘45), S Lennon 0–3, T McDonnell 0–3 (1f, 1tp), P Grimes-Murphy 0–2, K Martin 0–1		Pts: R Kelly 0–7 (1 tpf, 1f), R Lawlor 0–5 (2 tp), J Lynch 0–4 (3f), E Cowzer 0–2, C Keaveny 0–2, C Moran 0–2, L Kenny 0–1	Referee: S. Farrelly (Dublin)

GK	1	Tiernan Markey (St Mary's)
RCB	2	Padraic Tinnelly (Dundalk Gaels)
FB	3	Cormac McKeown (St Joseph's) (c)
LCB	4	Daniel Craven (St Mochta's)
RHB	5	Keelin Martin (St Mary's)
CHB	6	Micheál Reid (Hunterstown Rovers)
LHB	7	Tadhg Devaney (Glyde Rangers)
MF	8	Colm Hackett (St Fechin's)
MF	9	Conor McGinty (O'Raghallaighs)
RHF	10	Shane Lennon (St Mochta's)
CHF	11	Conor MacCroísta (Newtown Blues)
LHF	12	Pearse Grimes-Murphy (St Joseph's)
RCF	13	Adam Gillespie (St Mary's)
FF	14	Seán Flynn (Mattock Rangers)
LCF	15	Tony McDonnell (Dundalk Gaels)
Substitutes:
	16	Andrew O'Reilly (Naomh Fionnbarra) for Hackett

GK	1	Charlie Carroll (Eadestown)
RCB	2	Finn Dowling (Kilcock)
FB	3	Senan Gallagher (St Laurence's)
LCB	4	Ben Ryan (Round Towers) (jc)
RHB	5	Liam Kelly (Milltown)
CHB	6	Cian McKevitt (Naas)
LHB	7	Calum Keaveny (Athy)
MF	8	Evan Boyle (Carbury)
MF	9	Daniel Colbert (Clane)
RHF	10	Euan Cowzer (Naas)
CHF	11	Ruaidhrí Lawlor (St Laurence's)
LHF	12	Liam Kenny (Naas)
RCF	13	Jimmy Lynch (Clogherinkoe)
FF	14	Colm Moran (Athy) (jc)
LCF	15	Ronan Kelly (Athy)
Substitutes
	16	Harry Redmond (Sarsfields) for Kenny
	17	Rob Murray (Naas) for McKevitt
	18	Hugh Martin (Suncroft) for Cowzer

== Munster Championship ==
=== Munster Phase 1 ===
Pos	Team	Pld	W	D	L	SF	SA	Diff	Pts	Qualification
1	Clare	3	3	0	0	51	30	+21	6	Advance to Phase 2
2	Waterford	3	2	0	1	49	39	+10	4	Advance to Phase 2
3	Tipperary	3	1	0	2	47	54	-7	2	
4	Limerick	3	0	0	3	38	62	-24	0	

==== Munster Phase 1 Matches ====
Round 1

20 March 2026 Round 1	Clare	1–17 (20) – 0–10 (10)	Limerick	Ennis

20 March 2026 Round 1	Waterford	2–12 (18) – 1–11 (14)	Tipperary	Dungarvan

Round 2

27 March 2026 Round 2	Clare	2–14 (20) – 1–12 (15)	Waterford	Ennis

27 March 2026 Round 2	Limerick	1–15 (18) – 0–12 (12)	Tipperary	Rathkeale

Round 3

3 April 2026 Round 3	Clare	1–20 (23) – 0–08 (8)	Tipperary	Ennis

3 April 2026 Round 3	Waterford	1–11 (14) – 1–15 (18)	Limerick	Dungarvan

=== Munster 'B' Final ===
11 April 2026 Final	Tipperary	2-15 (21) – (8) 2-02	Limerick	Rathkeale
19:00		(HT: 0-00 - 2-02)		Venue: Mick Neville Park
				Referee: Seán Joy (Kerry)

=== Munster Phase 2 ===
Pos	Team	Pld	W	D	L	SF	SA	Diff	Pts	Qualification
1	Cork	3	2	1	0	56	34	+22	5	Advance to Munster Final
2	Kerry	3	2	0	1	68	27	+41	4	Advance to Munster Final
3	Waterford	3	1	0	2	42	85	-43	2	
4	Clare	3	0	1	2	39	59	-20	1	

==== Munster Phase 2 Matches ====
Round 1

9 April 2026 Round 1	Clare	1–10 (13) – 1–10 (13)	Cork	Quilty
19:00				Venue: Páirc Naomh Mhuire
	Pts: S Fennell 0–6, E Cahill 1–0, D Culligan 0–2, D McMahon 0–1, R Fallon 0–1		Pts: D Miskella 1–3, D Sheedy 0–4, S O’Leary 0–2, D Clifford 0–1	Referee: Jonathan Hayes (Limerick)

9 April 2026 Round 1	Waterford	0–10 (10) – 2–27 (33)	Kerry	Lemybrien
19:00
	Pts: J Brennan 0–6, P McCarthy 0–3, C Royle 0–1		Pts: G White 1–9, R Carroll 1–5, P Lane 0–4, D Kirby 0–2, M McKivergan 0–2, B Kelliher 0–2, E Boyle 0–1, J O’Sullivan 0–1, D Stack 0–1	Referee: John Ryan (Cork)

Round 2

16 April 2026 Round 2	Cork	0–10 (10) – 0–09 (9)	Kerry	Cork
19:00				Venue: SuperValu Páirc Uí Chaoimh
	Pts: D Miskella (2p, 1f) 0–3, M O’Brien (2p) 0–2, D Sheedy 0–1, O Foley 0–1, B Curtin (‘45’) 0–1, D O’Neill 0–1, S O’Leary 0–1		Pts: T Kennedy (1f) 0–3, P Lane (2f) 0–2, R Carroll 0–1, D Kirby 0–1, M McKivergan 0–1, S Ó Cuinn 0–1

16 April 2026 Round 2	Clare	2–13 (19) – 2–14 (20)	Waterford	Quilty
19:00				Venue: Páirc Naomh Mhuire
	Pts: D O’Dwyer 1–2, D Culligan 1–2, H O’Gorman 0–3, S Fennell 0–3, C Breen 0–2, S Culligan 0–1		Pts: J Brennan 1–3, P McCarthy 0–6, D Nyhan 1–2, C Royle 0–1, B Qualter 0–1, A Curran 0–1

Round 3

22 April 2026 Round 3	Cork	0–33 (33) – 1–09 (12)	Waterford	Cork
19:00				Venue: SuperValu Páirc Uí Chaoimh
	Pts: S Coakley 0–9, D O’Neill 0–6, D Miskella 0–4, L Shorten 0–3, R Barrett 0–3, B Curtin (tpf) 0–2, O Foley 0–2, D Clifford 0–1, D Ó Mullane 0–1, L Murphy 0–1, G Holland 0–1		Pts: D Mackle 1–1, J Brennan 0–4, P McCarthy 0–1, B Qualter 0–1, C Royle 0–1, P Bagnall 0–1	Referee: Chris Maguire (Clare)

22 April 2026 Round 3	Kerry	2–20 (26) – 0–07 (7)	Clare	Tralee
19:00				Venue: Austin Stack Park
	Pts: P Lane (tpf, 1f) 0–7, D Kirby (2p) 0–4, E Boyle 0–4, J Joy 0–3, G White 0–2, T Kennedy 0–2, M McKivergan 0–2, J O’Sullivan 0–1, R Carroll 0–1			Referee: David Murnane (Cork)

=== Knockout Stage ===
==== Munster Final ====
30 April 2026 Final	Kerry	3–14 (23) – 0–20 (20)	Cork	Tralee
19:00				Venue: Austin Stack Park
	Pts: P Lane (1f) 2–4, G White (1) 1–2, T Kennedy 0–3, K Dennehy 0–2, M McKivergan (‘45’) 0–2, R Carroll 0–1	Report	Pts: B Curtin (2 tpf, ‘45’) 0–5, S Coakley (2p, 1f) 0–5, R Barrett 0–4, D Miskella (tpf) 0–3, G Holland 0–1, M O’Brien 0–1	Referee: Chris Maguire (Clare)

== Ulster Championship ==
=== Ulster Group A ===
Pos	Team	Pld	W	D	L	SF	SA	Diff	Pts	Qualification
1	Donegal	4	4	0	0	73	55	+18	8	Advance to Semi-Finals
2	Derry	4	3	0	1	104	41	+63	6	Advance to Quarter-Finals
3	Monaghan	4	2	0	2	70	55	+15	4	Advance to Quarter-Finals
4	Fermanagh	4	1	0	3	59	101	-42	2	
5	Antrim	4	0	0	4	48	102	-54	0	

==== Ulster Group A Matches ====
Round 1

18 March 2026 Round 1	Donegal	2-15 (21) – (20) 3-11	Fermanagh	The Scarvey
19:30
	Pts: K Muldoon 1-3, D Boyle, S Callaghan, T Lenehan 0-3 each, K McLoughlin, D Mulholland 0-2 each, C McCrea, E Scott 0-1 each.		Pts: N Beattle 1-3, D Chapman 0-5, M McDermott 0-4, R Smyth 0-3, D Treacy, M Burns 0-1 each.	Referee: Christopher Brady

18 March 2026 Round 1	Monaghan	1-08 (11) – (14) 0-14	Derry	Castleblayney
19:30
	Pts: M McGinnity 1-5, L McKenna, M Carolan, M Finn 0-1 each.		Pts: C Higgins, T Rogers, C Spiers 0-3 each, J McGuckian, C Rocks 0-2 each, G Dillon 0-1.	Referee: Neil McGeown

Round 2

25 March 2026 Round 2	Monaghan	0-08 (8) – (12) 1-09	Donegal	Castleblayney
19:30
	Pts: M Finn 0-4, J Mooney ('45'), T Doherty, M McGinnty, S O'Connell 0-1 each. each		Pts: K Muldoon 1-2, K McLaughlin (2p) 0-3, F Roarty, S Callaghan (1f), T Lenehan 0-1 each.

25 March 2026 Round 2	Fermanagh	2-11 (17) – (13) 2-07	Antrim	Tempo
19:30				Venue: Tempo Maguires GAC
	Pts: M McDermott 1-4, D Chapman 1-1, M Burns 0-2, C Mulligan, N Beattle, O Swift, D Treacy 0-1 each.		Pts: J.J Higgins 0-3, C Walsh, N Hynds 1-0 each, D Higgins, I Robinson, R McKeever, A Macle 0-1 each.

Round 3

28 March 2026 Round 3	Derry	5-20 (35) – (3) 0-03	Fermanagh	Owenbeg
15:00				Venue: Find Insurance Owenbeg
	Pts: C Higgins 2-3, G Dillon 1-4, L Grant 1-1, C Hargan 0-3, J Bryson 1-0, c Spiers, J McGuckian 0-2 each, C Cassidy, D Doherty, D Rocks, M Higgins, P Haran 0-1 each.		Pts: M McDermott 0-3.

28 March 2026 Round 3	Donegal	2-19 (25) – (13) 2-07	Antrim	Ballyshannon
14:00				Venue: Father Tierney Park
	Pts: S Callaghan 0-6, D Ó Baoighill, T Lenehan 1-1, K McLoughlin, 0-3 each, D Hennighan 1-0, L McCaughan, T Carr 0-2 each, A Cunnea, C McCrea 0-1 each.		Pts: J.J Higgins 0-4, P Murray, R McKeever 1-0 each, D Higgins 0-2, L McLernon 0-1.

Round 4

1 April 2026 Round 4	Derry	1-11 (14) – (15) 1-12	Donegal	Owenbeg
19:30				Venue: Find Insurance Owenbeg
	Pts: G Dillon 0-5, C Rocks 1-0, J McGuckian 0-2, C Spiers, T Rogers, B McDaid 0-1 each.		Pts: M Campbell 1-1, S Callaghan 0-4, T Carr 0-3, K Muldoon, D Ó Baoighill 0-2 each.

1 April 2026 Round 4	Antrim	0-10 (10) – (19) 1-16	Monaghan	Dunsilly
19:30				Venue: Antrim GAA Centre of Excellence
	Pts: D Higgins 0-7, C Walsh 0-2, P Murray 0-1.		Pts: M Finn, T Doherty 0-4 each, M McGinnity 1-1, K Kearns 0-3, C Clerkin 0-2, L McKenna, S O'Connor 0-1 each.

Round 5

8 April 2026 Round 5	Antrim	0-12 (12) – (41) 6-23	Derry	Dunsilly
19:30				Venue: Antrim GAA Centre of Excellence
	Pts: I Robinson, J O'Neill 0-3 each, F Jemfrey 0-2, C Walsh, C Hale, J.J Higgins, L McLernon 0-1 each.		Pts: G Dillon 2-2, L Grant, J Boyle 1-3 each, C McCullagh 2-0, T Rogers, D Doherty 0-3 each, C Spiers, C Rocks, C Higgins 0-2 each, M Higgins, P Haran 0-1 each.

8 April 2026 Round 5	Fermanagh	1-16 (19) – (32) 3-23	Monaghan	Tempo
19:30				Venue: Tempo Maguires GAC
	Pts: M McDermott 0-9, C Mulligan 1-1, C Donohoe, N Beattle, R Smyth 0-2 each.		Pts: M McGinnity 0-8, C Murphy,M Finn 1-3 each, S O'Connor 0-3, M Carolan, L McKenna, T Doherty 0-2 each, J McCrystal, K Kearns, M Maguire 0-1 each.

=== Ulster Group B ===
Pos	Team	Pld	W	D	L	SF	SA	Diff	Pts	Qualification
1	Armagh	3	3	0	0	78	46	+32	6	Advance to Semi-Finals
2	Cavan	3	1	1	1	50	70	-20	3	Advance to Quarter-Finals
3	Tyrone	3	1	0	2	71	61	+10	2	Advance to Quarter-Finals
4	Down	3	0	1	2	55	77	-22	1	

==== Ulster Group B Matches ====
Round 1

25 March 2026 Round 1	Cavan	1-14 (17) – (15) 0-15	Tyrone	Cavan
19:30				Venue: Kingspan Breffni
	Pts: S McCabe 1-2, C McConnell, D Edwards, J Dobson, N Quigly 0-2 each, O Madden, D Noonan, B Tully, J Dugdale 0-1 each.		Pts: S McDermott 0-11, J Concannon 0-2, C O'Neill, L Lawn 0-1 each.

25 March 2026 Round 1	Down	1-12 (15) – (19) 0-19	Armagh	Newry
19:30				Venue: Páirc Esler
			Pts: E Duffy (1f), F Boylan 0-5, L McGeary 0-4, D O'Rourke 0-2, C Wilson, K McEntee, A Magennins 0-1 each.

Round 2

1 April 2026 Round 2	Armagh	2-26 (32) – (10) 0-10	Cavan	Armagh
19:30				Venue: BOX-IT Athletic Grounds
	Pts: E Duffy (2p, 1f) 0-6, F Boylan 1-3, A Haughey (2 tp) 0-5, D O'Rourke (2p, 1f) 0-4, M McSorley, L McGeary 0-3 each, S Kelly, C McKerr 0-1 each.		Pts: J Dobso (2f, tpf) 0-5, D Noonan (2f) 0-2, J Tynan, A Sheklton 0-1 each.

1 April 2026 Round 2	Tyrone	4-23 (35) – (17) 1-14	Down	Dungannon
19:30				Venue: O'Neill Park
	Pts: S McDermott 2-4, B Gallagher 2-0, R McCullagh 0-4, J Concannon 0-3, T Muldoon, L Hughes, C Devlin, A Quinn 0-2 each, J Mulgrew, A McGurren, C Sheehy, P Colton 0-1 each.		Pts: E Travers 0-8, C Ward 1-0, R Madine, T O'Hanlon 0-2 each, L Blayney, L Quinn 0-1 each.

Round 3

8 April 2026 Round 3	Armagh	1-24 (27) – (21) 2-15	Tyrone	Armagh
19:30				Venue: BOX-IT Athletic Grounds
	Pts: E Duffy 1-7, D O'Rourke 0-5, F Boylan, A Haughey 0-4 each, A McGuinness 0-2, L McGeary, M McSorley 0-1 each.		Pts: S McDermott 1-6, J Concannon 0-3, L Hughes 1-0, P Colton 0-2, A McGurren, A Quinn, C O'Neill, D Donaghy 0-1 each.

8 April 2026 Round 3	Down	1-20 (23) – (23) 2-17	Cavan	Newry
19:30				Venue: Páirc Esler
	Pts: E Travers 1-3, C Clerkin 0-5, D McKernan 0-4, R Madine 0-2, C Ward, D McAleenan, L Blayney, D O'Keefe, M Óg Flanagan, T O'Hanlon 0-1 each.

=== Ulster Tier 2 ===
20 April 2026 Semi-Final	Down	3-15 (24) – (14) 0-14	Antrim	Newry
19:30				Venue: Páirc Esler
	Pts: E Travers (2 tp, 6f) 0-10, R Madine 1-0, T O'Hanlon (2p) 0-2, L Blayney, L Quinn 0-1 each.			Referee: Eoin Murphy

28 April 2026 Final	Fermanagh	1-12 (15) – (31) 5-16	Down	Tempo
19:30				Venue: Tempo Maguires GAC
	Pts: C McElroy (3f) 0-4, S McHugh 1-0, D McManus 0-2, R McGovern, C McBrien 0-1 each		Pts: E Travers (5f) - 0-7, R Madine 1-1, T O'Hanlon 0-2, L Quinn, L Blayney 0-1 each.

=== Ulster Knockout Stage ===
Quarter-Finals
15 April, Derry
Derry	0-12
Tyrone	1-11
15 April, Cavan
Cavan	0-16
Monaghan	1-17

Semi-Finals
22 April, Convoy
Donegal	0-08
Tyrone	0-12
22 April, Armagh
Armagh	1-09
Monaghan	3-13

U20 Ulster Final
29 April, Armagh
Tyrone	4-19
Monaghan	0-22

==== Ulster Quarter-Finals ====
15 April 2026 Quarter-Final	Cavan	0-16 (16) – (20) 1-17	Monaghan	Cavan
19:30				Venue: Kingspan Breffni
	Pts: D Noonan 0-5, J Dobson, J Dugdale 0-2 each, B Tully, D Edwards, C McConnell, N Quigley, S McCabe, T Gilsenan, J Clarke 0-1 each.		Pts: T Doherty 0-6, M Maguire 1-3, M Finn 0-5, M Carolan 0-2, M McGinnity 0-1.

15 April 2026 Quarter-Final	Derry	0-12 (12) – (14) 1-11	Tyrone	Derry
19:30				Venue: Find Insurance Celtic Park
	Pts: G Dillon (tpf, 2f) 0-6, J McGuckian, T Rogers 0-2 each, C Rocks, C Higgins 0-1 each.		Pts: C O'Neill 1-1, J Concannon (2p), P Colton (2p) 0-3 each, S McDermot (1f) 0-2, T Muldoon, A Quinn 0-1 each.

==== Ulster Semi-Finals ====
22 April 2026 Semi-Final	Donegal	0-08 (8) – (12) 0-12	Tyrone	Convoy
19:30
	Pts: T Carr -2, D Hennigan, K McLoughlin, K Muldoon, L McCaughan, M Campbell, T Carr 0-1 each.		Pts: S McDermott 0-6, C O'Neill, L Hughes 0-2 each, A McGurren, P Colton 0-1 each.	Referee: Margaret Farrelly

22 April 2026 Semi-Final	Armagh	1-09 (12) – (22) 3-13	Monaghan	Armagh
19:30				Venue: BOX-IT Athletic Grounds
	Pts: A McGuinness 1-1, A Haughey 0-2, D O'Rourke, E Duffy, L Carroll, J McCooe, L McGeary, R Nugent 0-1 each.		Pts: M McGinnity 1-4, K Kearns 0-6, T Doherty 0-4, M Finn, J McCrystal 0-2 each, C Clerkin 0-1.	Referee: Conall Roberts

==== Ulster Final ====
29 April 2026 Final	Tyrone	4-19 (31) – (22) 0-22	Monaghan	Armagh
19:35				Venue: BOX-IT Athletic Grounds
	Pts: S McDermott, C Devlin, A Quinn 1-2 each, P Colton, A McGurren 0-4 each, D Donaghy 1-0, C Sheehy 0-2, T Muldoon, D Devlin 0-1 each.	Report	Pts: M Maguire (2 tp), T Doherty (2 tp) K Kierans (1f), M Carolan (2p) 0-3 each, M Quinn, M McGinnity (1f), T Mallen 0-1 each.	Referee: Mark Dorrian (Donegal)

== All-Ireland Under-20 Football Championship ==
=== All-Ireland Semi-Finals ===
8 May 2026 Semi-Final	Kerry	2–17 (23) – 1–12 (15)	Roscommon	Limerick
19:00				Venue: Mick Neville Park
	Pts: G White 1–5, P Lane (3f) 0–4, R Carroll 1–1, T Kennedy 0–3, D Kirby 0–2, E Boyle 0–1, M McKivergan 0–1		Pts: J Curran 1–3, C O’Carroll (3f) 0–4, R Kilcline 0–2, J McGuinness 0–1, D Casey 0–1, C Grogan 0–1

13 May 2026 Semi-Final	Kildare	0–13 (13) – 2–12 (18)	Tyrone	Dublin
19:00				Venue: Parnell Park
	Pts: J Lynch 0-6 (1tp, 0-1f, 0-1 45), R Kelly 0-3 (0-2fs), E Cowzer 0-2, D Colbert 0-1, R Murray 0-1		Pts: S McDermott 1-0, D Donaghy 1-0, C O’Neill 0-3 (1tp), A McGurren 0-2, P Colton 0-2, A Quinn 0-2, L Hughes 0-1, E Donaghy 0-1, D Devlin 0-1

=== All-Ireland Final ===
30 May 2026 Final	Kerry	0-21 (21) – (13) 1-10	Tyrone	Dublin
17:00		(HT: 0-09 - 1-08)		Venue: Croke Park
	Pts: Gearóid White 0-5 (2 tpf, 1f), Tomás Kennedy 0-4 (all frees), Daniel Kirby, Evan Boyle (1tp) both 0-3, Eoin O’Flaherty, Pa Walsh, Evan Boyle, Jack O’Sullivan, Killian Dennehy, Ronan Carroll all 0-1	Report	Pts: Shea McDermott 1-6 (1tpf, 1f), Adrian McGurren 0-3, Peter Colton 0-1	Referee: Thomas Murphy (Galway)

== All-Ireland Under-20 'B' Football Championship ==
=== All-Ireland 'B' Semi-Finals ===
10 May 2026 Semi-Final	Sligo	2-20 (26) – (26) 0-26 (a.e.t.) (5-3 pen)	Tipperary	Sligo
14:45				Venue: Markievicz Park
	Pts: M Walsh 1-0, E O'Mahony 1-1, C Nicholson (2p), A Lang 0-2 each, C Gilligan, P Flynn, J Lavin, C Carty 0-1 each.	l
		Penalty shootout

13 May 2026 Semi-Final	Down	0-22 (22) – (18) 1-15	Wexford	Abbottstown
20:00				Venue: Abbottstown GAA CoE
	Pts: R McVeigh (3f) 0-6, C Owens 0-4, C McLoughlin, S Dorans 0-3 each, E McCabe, C McCartan 0-2 each, J O'Hare, P O'Neill 0-1 each.each.	Report	Pts: T O'Neill (4f) 0-4, J O'Leary 1-0, C Byrne 0-3, L Doyle, E Murphy 0-2 each, C O'Shaughnessy 0-1	Referee: Andrew Smith

=== All-Ireland 'B' Final ===
23 May 2026 Final	Sligo	1-16 (19) – (8) 0-08	Down	Tullamore
16:00		(HT: 1-03 - 0-06)		Venue: Glenisk O'Connor Park
	Pts: Adam Feeney 1-1, Conor Langan 0-3, Conor Walsh 0-3, Eamon O’Mahony 0-3 (2fs), Cian Nicholson 0-2, Eamon Keane 0-1, Matthew Walsh 0-1, Cathal Gilligan 0-1, Oisín Devlin 0-1	Report	Pts: Ruairí Madine 0-2, Conor Ward 0-2, Daniel McKernan 0-1, Liam Blaney 0-1, Conor Rocks 0-1, Oisín Murphy 0-1	Referee: Diarmuid Boylan (Monaghan)

== Top scorers ==
Overall

Rank	Player	Club	Tally	Total	Matches	Average
1	Shea McDermott	Tyrone	5-37	52	8	6.5
2	Ronan Kelly	Kildare	3-28	37	6	6.17
3	John Curran	Roscommon	5-20	35	7	5
4	Jimmy Lynch	Kildare	2-27	33	6	5.5
5	Kobe McDonald	Mayo	4-20	32	5	6.4
5	Gearóid White	Kerry	4-20	32	6	5.33
7	Max McGinnity	Monaghan	3-20	29	7	4.41
8	Paddy Lane	Kerry	3-18	27	6	4.5
8	Ger Dillon	Derry	4-15	27	5	4.5
10	Darragh Beirne	Mayo	2-20	26	5	5.20

In a Single Game

Rank	Player	Club	Tally	Total	Opponent
1	Gearóid White	Kerry	1-09	12	Waterford
2	Eli Rooney	Sligo	0-11	11	Mayo
2	Shea McDermott	Tyrone	0-11	11	Cavan
2	Jimmy Lynch	Kildare	1-08	11	Meath
2	John Harkin	Meath	2-05	11	Carlow
6	Ronan Kelly	Kildare	2-04	10	Wicklow
6	Ronan Kelly	Kildare	1-07	10	Westmeath
6	John Curran	Roscommon	2-04	10	Leitrim
6	Mikey Mulryan	Galway	1-07	10	Mayo
6	Paddy Lane	Kerry	2-04	10	Cork
6	Eoin Duffy	Armagh	1-07	10	Tyrone
6	Eoin Travers	Down]	0-10	10	Antrim
