= 1915 Fitzgibbon Cup =

Irish collegiate hurling tournament

- Dates: 2 March 1915
- Teams: 2
- Champions: University College Dublin (2nd title); Éamon Bulfin (captain)
- Runners-up: University College Cork

Tournament statistics
- Matches played: 1
- Goals scored: 9 (9 per match)
- Points scored: 0 (0 per match)

The 1915 Fitzgibbon Cup was the fourth edition of the intercollegiate hurling competition organized by the Gaelic Athletic Association. Established in 1912, the tournament was hosted by University College Dublin (UCD) on March 2nd, 1915.

University College Cork (UCC) entered the competition as the defending champions, having won the 1914 tournament.

In the final held on March 2nd, UCD emerged victorious, defeating UCC by a score of 6-00 to 3-00. This marked UCD's second Fitzgibbon Cup title overall and their first since the inaugural competition in 1912.

== Teams ==
University College Galway did not field a team, meaning that University College Cork and University College Dublin were the only participants. Because of this, the round robin format was abolished and just one game was played to determine the cup winners.

== Results ==
=== Final ===
2 March 1915 Final	University College Dublin	6-00 - 3-00	University College Cork	Terenure
