= 1943 Dublin Senior Hurling Championship =

Annual hurling competition season

- Champions: Young Irelands (4th title)
- Runners-up: University College Dublin

The 1943 Dublin Senior Hurling Championship was the 56th staging of the Dublin Senior Hurling Championship since its establishment by the Dublin County Board in 1887.

Young Irelands entered the championship as the defending champions.

The final was played on 30 May 1943 at Croke Park in Dublin, between Young Irelands and University College Dublin, in what was their fourth meeting in the final overall. Young Irelands won the match by 6–10 to 3–03 to claim their fourth championship title overall and a second consecutive title.

== Results ==
=== Final ===
30 May 1943 Final	Young Irelands	6-10 - 3-03	University College Dublin	Croke Park
