= 1996 All-Ireland Under-21 Football Championship =

Gaelic football competition

Championship details

All-Ireland Champions
- Winning team: Kerry (8th win)
- Captain: Liam Hassett
- Managers: Páidí Ó Sé; Jack O'Connor

All-Ireland Finalists
- Losing team: Cavan
- Manager: Martin McHugh

Provincial Champions
- Munster: Kerry
- Leinster: Meath
- Ulster: Cavan
- Connacht: Galway

The 1996 All-Ireland Under-21 Football Championship was the 33rd staging of the All-Ireland Under-21 Football Championship since its establishment by the Gaelic Athletic Association in 1964.

Kerry entered the championship as defending champions.

On 8 September 1996, Kerry won the championship following a 1–17 to 2–10 defeat of Cavan in the All-Ireland final. This was their eighth All-Ireland title overall and their second in successive championship seasons.

== Results ==
=== Leinster Under-21 Football Championship ===
12 May
Final

Meath	1-08 - 0-08	Louth
Dillon 1-1, Giles 0-3(3f), Regan 0-1, Kealy 0-1, Murphy 0-1, Callaghan 0-1		O'Kane 0-6(6f), Callan 0-1, Kirk 0-1

Parnell Park, Dublin

GK	1	Cormac Sullivan (St Patrick's)
RCB	2	Mark O'Reilly (Summerhill)
FB	3	Darren Fay (Trim)
LCB	4	Barry Sheridan (Moynalvey)
RHB	5	Stephen Carolan (Slane)
CHB	6	Alan Finnegan (Seneschalstown)
LHB	7	Ned Kearney (Simonstown Gaels)
MF	8	Trevor Giles (Skryne) (c)
MF	9	Stephen O'Rourke (Dunderry)
RHF	10	Richie Kealy (Dunshaughlin)
CHF	11	Stephen Dillon (Syddan)
LHF	12	Paddy Reynolds (Walterstown)
RCF	13	Ray Magee (Kilmainhamwood)
FF	14	Nigel Regan (St Michael's)
LCF	15	Ollie Murphy (Carnaross)
Substitutes:
	16	Barry Callaghan (Dunderry) for Reynolds

GK	1	Séamus Quigley (Kilkerley Emmets)
RCB	2	Ollie Reilly (St Fechin's)
FB	3	Ciarán Nash (Roche Emmets)
LCB	4	David Brennan (Mattock Rangers)
RHB	5	Aaron Hoey (St Bride's)
CHB	6	Niall Flynn (Glyde Rangers)
LHB	7	Declan O'Sullivan (St Joseph's)
MF	8	Wayne Carroll (Lann Léire) (c)
MF	9	Paddy McGuigan (Dreadnots)
RHF	10	Peter O'Kane (Dundalk Gaels)
CHF	11	John Levins (Hunterstown Rovers)
LHF	12	Martin King (St Kevin's)
RCF	13	Niall Callan (Mattock Rangers)
FF	14	Ollie McDonnell (St Joseph's)
LCF	15	Mark Stanfield (O'Connells)
Substitutes:
	16	Hugh Kirk (St Bride's) for Stanfield
	17	Aidan Shevlin (Stabannon Parnells) for King

=== All-Ireland Under-21 Football Championship ===
Semi-finals

4 August 1996 Semi-final	Cavan	1-09 - 1-09	Meath	Dr. Hyde Park, Roscommon

17 August 1996 Semi-final	Kerry	3-09 - 0-12	Galway	Cusack Park, Ennis

25 August 1996 Semi-final replay	Cavan	1-11 - 1-09	Meath	Dr. Hyde Park, Roscommon

Finals

8 September 1996 Final	Kerry	1-17 - 2-10	Cavan	Semple Stadium, Thurles

== Statistics ==
=== Miscellaneous ===
- The All-Ireland semi-final between Cavan and Meath is the first championship meeting between the two teams.
- The All-Ireland final between Kerry and Cavan is the first championship meeting between the two teams.
