= Paddy Kerr =

Irish Gaelic footballer

Paddy Kerr is an Irish former Gaelic footballer who played for Ballybay Pearses and the Monaghan county team.

Kerr is the son of a Dublin inter-county footballer, while members of his mother's family played inter-county football for Monaghan. He first played senior inter-county football for Monaghan in 1968, shortly after making his senior club debut. His inter-county career lasted until 1985. Kerr also trained the senior county team in the mid-1970s.

He played in the half-back position on the Monaghan team that won the 1979 Ulster Senior Football Championship (SFC) title. He was then Pat Spillane's marker during the 1979 All-Ireland SFC semi-final defeat to Kerry. By the time of Monaghan's National Football League-winning season of 1985, and the Ulster SFC title that followed, Kerr was no longer starting games for Monaghan, and was helping manager Seán McCague as a team selector. However, he still received medals for both title wins. When McCague departed, Kerr took over as team manager for one season.

Kerr played club football between 1967 and 1988. He won the 1969 and 1987 Monaghan SFC titles. He captained UCD to the 1973–74 All-Ireland Senior Club Football Championship title, while also winning two Dublin SFC titles and consecutive Sigerson Cup titles in 1973 and 1974.

Kerr also played for Ulster in the 1976 Railway Cup final. He managed Ballybay Pearses to the 1999 Monaghan Minor Football Championship. He was inducted into the Monaghan GAA Hall of Fame in 2017.

By 2002, Kerr was deputy principal of the Ballybay Community College secondary school. As of 2005, he was its principal. He is married, with six children.

Achievements
Preceded by Billy Morgan (Nemo Rangers)	All-Ireland Club SFC winning captain 1974	Succeeded by
