= 1975 All-Ireland Under-21 Football Championship =

Gaelic football competition

Championship details

All-Ireland Champions
- Winning team: Kerry (3rd win)
- Captain: Kevin O'Donoghue
- Manager: Mick O'Dwyer

All-Ireland Finalists
- Losing team: Dublin

Provincial Champions
- Munster: Kerry
- Leinster: Dublin
- Ulster: Antrim
- Connacht: Mayo

The 1975 All-Ireland Under-21 Football Championship was the 12th staging of the All-Ireland Under-21 Football Championship since its establishment by the Gaelic Athletic Association in 1964.

Mayo entered the championship as defending champions, however, they were defeated by Dublin in the All-Ireland semi-final.

On 12 October 1975, Kerry won the championship following a 1-15 to 0-10 defeat of Dublin in the All-Ireland final. This was their third All-Ireland title overall and their first in two championship seasons.

== Results ==
=== All-Ireland Under-21 Football Championship ===
Semi-finals

17 August 1975 Semi-final	Mayo	1-09 - 1-12	Dublin	MacHale Park, Castlebar

17 August 1975 Semi-final	Kerry	1-15 - 1-04	Antrim	Austin Stack Park, Tralee

Final

12 October 1975 Final	Kerry	1-15 - 1-10	Dublin	Seán Treacy Park, Tipperary

== Statistics ==
=== Miscellaneous ===
- Kerry become the first team to win senior, minor and under-21 All-Ireland titles in the same year.
