= 1973 All-Ireland Under-21 Football Championship =

1973 Football Championship

Championship details

All-Ireland Champions
- Winning team: Kerry (2nd win)
- Captain: John Coffey

All-Ireland Finalists
- Losing team: Kerry

Provincial Champions
- Munster: Kerry
- Leinster: Offaly
- Ulster: Tyrone
- Connacht: Mayo

The 1973 All-Ireland Under-21 Football Championship was the 10th staging of the All-Ireland Under-21 Football Championship since its establishment by the Gaelic Athletic Association in 1964.

Galway entered the championship as defending champions, however, they were defeated by Mayo in the Connacht final.

On 16 September 1973, Kerry won the championship following a 2-13 to 0-13 defeat of Mayo in the All-Ireland final. This was their second All-Ireland title overall and their first in nine championship seasons.

== Results ==
=== All-Ireland Under-21 Football Championship ===
Semi-finals

26 August 1973 Semi-final	Kerry	3-11 - 1-10	Offaly	Austin Stack Park, Tralee

26 August 1973 Semi-final	Tyrone	0-12 - 1-09	Mayo	O'Neill Park, Dungannon

2 September 1973 Semi-final replay	Mayo	1-14 - 1-06	Tyrone	Páirc Seán Mac Diarmada, Carrick

Final

16 September 1973 Final	Kerry	2-13 - 0-13	Mayo	Cusack Park, Ennis

== Statistics ==
=== Miscellaneous ===
- The All-Ireland semi-final between Kerry and Offaly is the first ever championship meeting between the two teams.
