= Cahir Healy (dual player) =

Irish hurler and Gaelic footballer

Personal information
- Native name: Cahir Ó hÉilí (Irish)
- Born: 27 December 1986 (age 39) Portlaoise, Ireland
- Occupation: Primary school teacher
- Height: 1.77 m (5 ft 10 in)

Sport
- Football Position: Left Corner Back
- Hurling Position: Right half back
Club
- Years: Club
- Portlaoise
Club titles
	Football	Hurling
Laois titles	9	1
Leinster titles	2	0
All-Ireland titles	0	0
Inter-county
- Years: County
- 2005– 2008–2012: Laois (H); Laois (F)
Inter-county titles
	Football	Hurling
Leinster Titles	0	0
All-Ireland Titles	0	0
League titles	0	1
All-Stars	0	0

Cahir Healy (born 27 December 1986) is an Irish dual player. He plays hurling and football with his local club Portlaoise. He has played hurling and football at inter-county level with Laois although he is currently focusing on hurling.

== Career ==
Cahir Healy, also known as the "music man" (because of his amazing singing) or "Totti of Laois" is a Laois dual Star, who predominantly lines out in defence.

Cahir was part of the Laois team that won the All-Ireland Minor Football Championship title in 2003. Laois have won three Minor Football title's, the other two were in 1997 and 1996.

In 2004, he was part of the Laois minor team which won the Leinster Minor Football Championship and in the same year, Cahir was on the Portlaoise Senior Hurling team that won the Laois county championship.

In 2006 and again in 2007, Cahir was part of the Laois team that won the Leinster Under-21 Football Championship.

In 2007 Cahir was also part of the Laois hurling team that won the National Hurling League Division 2 in 2007.

At club level, Cahir usually lines out as a defender with Portlaoise. Cahir has won eleven County (1 hurling and 10 football) and two Leinster club football titles.

At the start of 2013 he left the Laois footballers and committed to the Laois hurlers.

In 2019, Cahir reversed this decision and decided to commit to the Laois GAA football panel under the management of John Sugrue. Unfortunately the year was very short lived as his ACL ruptured. Cahir would have been an instrumental part in the panel, the Laois supporters wish Cahir well in his recovery and hope to see him back on the pitch soon.

During Healy's hurling and football career, he also works as a primary school teacher in south west London. He usually flew to Ireland and back every weekend before he had his leg injury in 2019.

== Honours ==
Portlaoise

- Laois Senior Hurling Championship (1): 2004
- Laois Senior A Hurling Championship (2): 2015, 2018
- Laois Senior Football Championship (12): 2004, 2007, 2008, 2009, 2010, 2011, 2012, 2013, 2014, 2015, 2017, 2018
- Leinster Senior Club Football Championship (2): 2004, 2009

Laois

- Leinster Minor Football Championship (1): 2004
- All-Ireland Minor Football Championship (1): 2003
- Leinster Under-21 Football Championship (2): 2006, 2007
- National Hurling League, Division 2 (1): 2007
