= 1995 All-Ireland Under-21 Football Championship =

Gaelic football competition

Championship details

All-Ireland Champions
- Winning team: Kerry (7th win)
- Captain: Denis O'Dwyer
- Manager: Páidí Ó Sé

All-Ireland Finalists
- Losing team: Mayo
- Captain: Kenneth Mortimer
- Manager: Martin Carney

Provincial Champions
- Munster: Kerry
- Leinster: Offaly
- Ulster: Donegal
- Connacht: Mayo

The 1995 All-Ireland Under-21 Football Championship was the 32nd staging of the All-Ireland Under-21 Football Championship since its establishment by the Gaelic Athletic Association in 1964.

Cork entered the championship as defending champions, however, they were defeated by Tipperary in the Munster quarter-final.

On 10 September 1995, Kerry won the championship following a 3-10 to 1-12 defeat of Mayo in a replay of the All-Ireland final. This was their seventh All-Ireland title overall and their first in five championship seasons.

== Results ==
=== All-Ireland Under-21 Football Championship ===
Semi-finals

6 August 1995 Semi-final	Kerry	2-06 - 1-05	Donegal	Tuam Stadium, Tuam

6 August 1995 Semi-final	Mayo	0-11 - 0-09	Offaly	Pearse Park

Finals

27 August 1995 Final	Kerry	2-12 - 3-09	Mayo	O'Connor Park, Tullamore
				Attendance: 10,000

10 September 1995 Final replay	Kerry	3-10 - 1-12	Mayo	Semple Stadium, Thurles
				Attendance: 25,234
