= 2025 All-Ireland Under-20 Football Championship =

Gaelic games tournament

Championship details
- Dates: 8 March – 28 May 2025
- Teams: 31

All-Ireland Champions
- Winning team: Tyrone (8th win)
- Captain: Joey Clarke
- Manager: Paul Devlin

All-Ireland Finalists
- Losing team: Louth
- Captain: Seán Callaghan
- Manager: Fergal Reel

Provincial Champions
- Munster: Kerry
- Leinster: Louth
- Ulster: Tyrone
- Connacht: Mayo

Championship statistics
- Top Scorer: Eoin McElholm (6-24)

The 2025 All-Ireland Under-20 Football Championship was the seventh staging of the All-Ireland Under-20 Championship and the 62nd staging overall of a Gaelic football championship for players between the minor and senior grades.

The defending champions Tyrone retained their Ulster Championship title and qualified for the All-Ireland final by defeating Munster champions Kerry, in the first of the All-Ireland semi-finals on 11 March. They awaited the winner of the clash between Mayo and Louth, which the Leinster Champions won by a single point.

The All-Ireland final took place at the BOX-IT Athletic Grounds in Armagh on 28 May 2025 between Tyrone and Louth, in what was the first ever meeting of the counties in the final. After leading by five points at half-time, Tyrone went on to win by 5–16 to 0–17 and successfully defend their All-Ireland title, claiming an eighth title overall at the grade and a third in four years.

== Connacht Under-20 Football Championship ==
=== Connacht group stage ===
==== Connacht group stage table ====
Pos	Team	Pld	W	D	L	SF	SA	Diff	Pts	Qualification
1	Mayo	4	4	0	0	110	65	45	8	Advance to final
2	Roscommon	4	2	1	1	81	53	28	5	Advance to semi-final
3	Sligo	4	2	0	2	79	98	-19	4	Advance to semi-final
4	Galway	4	1	1	2	74	66	8	3	
5	Leitrim	4	0	0	4	60	122	-62	0	

==== Connacht group stage results ====
19 March 2025 Round 1	Mayo	1-15 - 0-13	Roscommon

19 March 2025 Round 1	Leitrim	1-10 - 1-21	Galway

26 March 2025 Round 2	Roscommon	1-16 - 1-10	Sligo

26 March 2025 Round 2	Galway	3-13 - 2-18	Mayo

2 April 2025 Round 3	Mayo	5-16 - 0-08	Leitrim

2 April 2025 Round 3	Sligo	2-09 - 2-08	Galway

9 April 2025 Round 4	Leitrim	2-22 - 5-17	Sligo

9 April 2025 Round 4	Galway	1-11 - 0-14	Roscommon

16 April 2025 Round 5	Roscommon	6-17 - 1-08	Leitrim

16 April 2025 Round 5	Sligo	2-16 - 5-22	Mayo

=== Connacht semi-final ===
23 April 2025 Semi-final	Roscommon	4-12 - 1-18	Sligo

=== Connacht final ===
30 April 2025 Final	Mayo	2-17 - 4-08	Roscommon	Tuam Stadium
	D. Beirne (1-03, 0-02f), T. Lydon (0-05, 0-02f) S. Howards (1-00), C. McHale (0-03), O. Cronin, D. Neary (0-01 each)		R. Carthy (1-04, 1tpf, 0-02f), J. McGuinness, B. Greene (0-02 each), J. Curran, C. Grogan (0-01 each)	Referee: Thomas Murphy (Galway)

== Leinster Under-20 Football Championship ==
=== Leinster group 1 ===
==== Leinster group 1 table ====
Pos	Team	Pld	W	D	L	SF	SA	Diff	Pts	Qualification
1	Meath	3	2	0	1	61	51	10	4	Advance to quarter-finals
2	Dublin	3	2	0	1	70	59	11	4	Advance to quarter-finals
3	Westmeath	3	1	0	2	50	59	-9	2	
4	Offaly	3	1	0	2	48	60	-12	2	

==== Leinster group 1 results ====
26 March 2025 Round 1	Meath	1-22 - 1-18	Dublin

26 March 2025 Round 1	Offaly	0-14 - 1-17	Westmeath

2 April 2025 Round 2	Westmeath	0-12 - 0-19	Meath

2 April 2025 Round 2	Offaly	1-13 - 2-17	Dublin

9 April 2025 Round 3	Dublin	2-20 - 3-09	Westmeath

9 April 2025 Round 3	Meath	2-11 - 1-15	Offaly

=== Leinster group 2 ===
==== Leinster group 2 table ====
Pos	Team	Pld	W	D	L	SF	SA	Diff	Pts	Qualification
1	Louth	2	2	0	0	55	40	15	4	Advance to semi-finals
2	Wicklow	2	1	0	1	45	48	-3	2	Advance to quarter-finals
3	Longford	2	0	0	2	39	51	-12	0	

==== Leinster group 2 results ====
26 March 2025 Round 1	Louth	4-16 - 1-15	Longford

2 April 2025 Round 2	Wicklow	1-19 - 0-27	Louth

9 April 2025 Round 3	Longford	1-18 - 3-14	Wicklow

=== Leinster group 3 ===
==== Leinster group 3 table ====
Pos	Team	Pld	W	D	L	SF	SA	Diff	Pts	Qualification
1	Kildare	3	3	0	0	92	39	53	6	Advance to semi-finals
2	Wexford	3	1	1	1	50	60	-10	3	Advance to quarter-finals
3	Laois	3	0	2	1	41	62	-21	2	
4	Carlow	3	0	1	2	48	70	-22	1	

==== Leinster group 3 results ====
26 March 2025 Round 1	Laois	0-06 - 3-18	Kildare

26 March 2025 Round 1	Carlow	0-14 - 2-10	Wexford

2 April 2025 Round 2	Laois	0-19 - 1-16	Wexford

2 April 2025 Round 2	Kildare	4-26 - 0-18	Carlow

9 April 2025 Round 3	Wexford	1-12 - 2-24	Kildare

9 April 2025 Round 3	Carlow	1-13 - 2-10	Laois

=== Leinster quarter-finals ===
16 April 2025 Quarter-final	Meath	0-20 - 2-10	Wexford

16 April 2025 Quarter-final	Wicklow	0-17 - 1-19	Dublin

=== Leinster semi-finals ===
22 April 2025 Semi-final	Louth	0-14 - 0-11	Dublin

22 April 2025 Semi-final	Meath	0-19 - 1-08	Kildare

=== Leinster final ===
30 April 2025 Final	Louth	2-19 - 1-15	Meath	Cedral St Conleth's Park
	A. Gillespie 1-3 (1f), P. Grimes-Murphy 1-3 (1 2p), Ty. McDonnell 0-4 (1f), Tadhg McDonnell 0-4 (1 2p), D. Dorian 0-2, S. Lennon, J. Maguire, T. Markey ('45) 0-1 each		J. Murphy 0-6 (2f, 1 2p), M. McIvor 0-4 (2 2p), T. Martyn 1-0, E. Armstrong 0-2, R. Stafford, Z. Thornton, F. White 0-1 each	Referee: Ian Howley (Dublin)

GK	1	Tiernan Markey (St Mary's)
RCB	2	Micheál Reid (Hunterstown Rovers)
FB	3	Cormac McKeown (St Joseph's)
LCB	4	Padraic Tinnelly (Dundalk Gaels)
RHB	5	Tadhg McDonnell (St Mary's)
CHB	6	Keelin Martin (St Mary's)
LHB	7	Conor McGinty (O'Raghallaighs)
MF	8	Seán Callaghan (St Mary's) (c)
MF	9	James Maguire (Westerns)
RHF	10	Shane Lennon (St Mochta's)
CHF	11	Conor MacCroísta (Newtown Blues)
LHF	12	Pearse Grimes-Murphy (St Joseph's)
RCF	13	Adam Gillespie (St Mary's)
FF	14	Tony McDonnell (Dundalk Gaels)
LCF	15	Darragh Dorian (Naomh Máirtín)
Substitutes:
	16	Dylan Shevlin (Stabannon Parnells) for MacCroísta

GK	1	Matthew Kealy (Slane)
RCB	2	Sam Jordan (Na Fianna)
FB	3	Rian Early (Gaeil Colmcille)
LCB	4	Ciarán O'Hare (Rathkenny)
RHB	5	Tadhg Martyn (Slane) (c)
CHB	6	Fiach Hartigan (Dunshaughlin)
LHB	7	Finn White (Kilbride)
MF	8	Éamonn Armstrong (Duleek/Bellewstown)
MF	9	Michael McIvor (St Vincent's)
RHF	10	Rian Stafford (Kilmainhamwood)
CHF	11	John Harkin (St Peter's Dunboyne)
LHF	12	Zach Thornton (Donaghmore/Ashbourne)
RCF	13	Ben Corkery (Clann na nGael)
FF	14	Jamie Murphy (St Patrick's)
LCF	15	Liam Jennings (Blackhall Gaels)
Substitutes
	16	Michael O'Sullivan (Donaghmore/Ashbourne) for Jennings
	17	Cillian Yore (St Ultan's) for Hartigan
	18	Pat Crawley (Oldcastle) for Corkery
	19	Seán Betson (Navan O'Mahonys) for Thornton
	20	Conor O'Brien (St Vincent's) for Betson

== Munster Under-20 Football Championship ==
=== Munster phase 1 ===
==== Munster phase 1 table ====
Pos	Team	Pld	W	D	L	SF	SA	Diff	Pts	Qualification
1	Tipperary	3	3	0	0	55	30	25	6	Advance to phase 2
2	Clare	3	1	0	2	51	50	1	2	Advance to phase 2
3	Waterford	3	1	0	2	47	59	-12	2	
4	Limerick	3	1	0	2	32	46	-14	2	

==== Munster phase 1 results ====
8 March 2025 Round 1	Clare	2-15 - 4-12	Waterford

8 March 2025 Round 1	Limerick	0-06 - 3-08	Tipperary

15 March 2025 Round 2	Tipperary	0-15 - 0-14	Clare

15 March 2025 Round 2	Waterford	0-13 - 0-15	Limerick

22 March 2025 Round 3	Tipperary	2-17 - 1-07	Waterford

22 March 2025 Round 3	Clare	0-16 - 0-11	Limerick

=== Munster phase 2 ===
==== Munster phase 2 table ====
Pos	Team	Pld	W	D	L	SF	SA	Diff	Pts	Qualification
1	Kerry	3	3	0	0	82	39	43	6	Advance to Munster final
2	Cork	3	1	1	1	54	55	-1	3	Advance to Munster final
3	Tipperary	3	1	1	1	49	56	-7	3	
4	Clare	3	0	0	3	44	79	-35	0	

==== Munster phase 2 fixtures and results ====
1 April 2025 Round 1	Tipperary	1-10 - 2-19	Kerry

1 April 2025 Round 1	Clare	1-13 - 3-16	Cork

7 April 2025 Round 2	Kerry	1-22 - 1-12	Cork

8 April 2025 Round 2	Tipperary	2-16 - 0-17	Clare

15 April 2025 Round 3	Kerry	3-23 - 0-11	Clare

15 April 2025 Round 3	Cork	1-11 - 0-14	Tipperary

=== Munster final ===
28 April 2025	Cork	1-10 - 2-15	Kerry	Supervalu Páirc Uí Chaoimh
				Referee: Eoin Morrissey (Waterford

== Ulster Under-20 Football Championship ==
=== Ulster section A ===
==== Ulster section A table ====
Pos	Team	Pld	W	D	L	SF	SA	Diff	Pts	Qualification
1	Donegal	4	4	0	0	110	44	66	8	Advance to semi-finals
2	Tyrone	4	3	0	1	115	52	63	6	Advance to quarter-finals
3	Down	4	2	0	2	83	95	-12	4	Advance to quarter-finals
4	Fermanagh	4	0	1	3	52	106	-54	1	
5	Antrim	4	0	1	3	50	113	-63	1	

==== Ulster section A group results ====
19 March 2025 Round 1	Fermanagh	1-08 - 1-18	Donegal

19 March 2025 Round 1	Down	0-11 - 3-15	Tyrone

26 March 2025 Round 2	Tyrone	6-26 - 0-06	Fermanagh

26 March 2025 Round 2	Antrim	0-02 - 3-23	Donegal

29 March 2025 Round 3	Donegal	3-23 - 1-11	Down

29 March 2025 Round 3	Antrim	0-17 - 1-14	Fermanagh

2 April 2025 Round 4	Down	1-10 - 2-15	Antrim

2 April 2025 Round 4	Donegal	1-10 - 2-15	Tyrone

9 April 2025 Round 5	Tyrone	2-24 - 0-10	Antrim

10 April 2025 Round 5	Fermanagh	3-09 - 2-18	Down

==== Ulster section B table ====
Pos	Team	Pld	W	D	L	SF	SA	Diff	Pts	Qualification
1	Derry	3	3	0	0	89	45	44	6	Advance to semi-finals
2	Cavan	3	1	1	1	57	64	-7	3	Advance to quarter-finals
3	Armagh	3	1	0	2	60	75	-15	2	Advance to quarter-finals
4	Monaghan	3	0	1	2	46	68	-22	1	

==== Ulster section B results ====
26 March 2025 Round 1	Armagh	0-13 - 2-24	Derry

26 March 2025 Round 1	Monaghan	1-10 - 0-13	Cavan

2 April 2025 Round 2	Derry	3-21 - 1-10	Monaghan

2 April 2025 Round 2	Cavan	3-16 - 1-19	Armagh

9 April 2025 Round 3	Cavan	2-13 - 1-26	Derry

9 April 2025 Round 3	Armagh	3-16 - 2-14	Monaghan

=== Ulster quarter-finals ===
16 April 2025 Quarter-final	Cavan	2-26 - 1-13	Down

16 April 2025 Quarter-final	Tyrone	3-15 - 1-11	Armagh

=== Ulster semi-finals ===
23 April 2025 Semi-final	Donegal	4-19 - 2-07	Cavan

23 April 2025 Semi-final	Derry	0-19 - 3-12	Tyrone

=== Ulster final ===
30 April 2025 Final	Tyrone	1-19 - 2-14	Donegal	Owenbeg
				Referee: Kevin Faloon (Armagh)

== All-Ireland Under-20 Football Championship ==
=== All-Ireland semi-finals ===
11 May 2025 Semi-final	Tyrone	2-14 - 1-14	Kerry	Laois Hire O'Moore Park
				Referee: Barry Judge (Sligo)

16 May 2025 Semi-final	Mayo	0-17 - 2-12	Louth	Glennon Brothers Pearse Park
	T. Lydon 0-5 (1f), D. Beirne (1 2pf, 1f), C. Lynch (1 2p) 0-4 each, N. Hurley 0-2, P Gilmore, H O'Loughlin, 0-1 each		P. Grimes-Murphy 1-3 (1 2p), S. Lennon 1-2, A. Gillespie, T. Markey (2pf) 0-2 each, J. Maguire, Ty. McDonnell, Tadhg McDonnell 0-1 each	Referee: Conor Dourneen (Cavan)

=== All-Ireland final ===
28 May 2025 Final	Louth	0-17 - 5-16	Tyrone	BOX-IT Athletic Grounds
7.30	S. Callaghan (1 2p) 0-4, J. Maguire (1 2p) 0-4, Tadhg McDonnell (1 2p) 0-3, Ty. McDonnell (1f) 0-2, A. Gillespie (f), S. Lennon, C. MacCroísta, D. Shevlin 0-1 each	Report	N. Grimes 2-6, E. McElholm 2-4, S. McDermott 1-1, R. McCullagh (1f) 0-2, J. Clarke, C. Donnelly, C. O'Neill 0-1 each	Referee: Noel Mooney (Cavan)

GK	1	Tiernan Markey (St Mary's)
RCB	2	Micheál Reid (Hunterstown Rovers)
FB	3	Cormac McKeown (St Joseph's)
LCB	4	Padraic Tinnelly (Dundalk Gaels)
RHB	5	Tadhg McDonnell (St Mary's)
CHB	6	Keelin Martin (St Mary's)
LHB	7	Conor McGinty (O'Raghallaighs)
MF	8	Seán Callaghan (St Mary's) (c)
MF	9	James Maguire (Westerns)
RHF	10	Shane Lennon (St Mochta's)
CHF	11	Conor MacCroísta (Newtown Blues)
LHF	12	Pearse Grimes-Murphy (St Joseph's)
RCF	13	Adam Gillespie (St Mary's)
FF	14	Tony McDonnell (Dundalk Gaels)
LCF	15	Darragh Dorian (Naomh Máirtín)
Substitutes:
	16	Ben McKeown (St Joseph's) for Reid
	17	James McGlew (St Fechin's) for McGinty
	18	Dylan Shevlin (Stabannon Parnells) for Dorian

GK	1	Conan McGarvey (Galbally)
RCB	2	Fiachra Nelis (Edendork)
FB	3	Ben Hughes (Donaghmore)
LCB	4	Conor Devlin (Ardboe)
RHB	5	Callum Daly (Omagh)
CHB	6	Joey Clarke (Donaghmore) (c)
LHB	7	Caolan Donnelly (Fintona)
MF	8	Conan Devlin (Ardboe)
MF	9	Conor O'Neill (Donaghmore)
RHF	10	Conall Sheehy (Cookstown)
CHF	11	Eoin McElholm (Loughmacrory)
LHF	12	Matthew Quinn (Dungannon)
RCF	13	Noah Grimes (Donaghmore)
FF	14	Ruairí McCullagh (Loughmacrory)
LCF	15	Liam Óg Mossey (Gortin)
Substitutes
	16	Eoin Donaghy (Loughmacrory) for Sheehy
	17	Darragh Donaghy (Galbally) for Mossey
	18	Shea McDermott (Errigal Ciarán) for Conan Devlin
	19	Liam Lawn (Moortown) for McCullagh
	20	Seán Broderick (Killyclogher) for Nelis

== Statistics ==
Rank	Player	Club	Tally	Total
1	Ruairi McCullagh	Tyrone	1-48	51
2	Rory Carthy	Roscommon	3-32	41
3	Tom Lydon	Mayo	2-35	41
4	Eoin McElholm	Tyrone	6-23	41
5	Joe Quigley	Dublin	2-34	40
6	Seanan Carr	Donegal	5-28	39
7	Daithi Hogan	Tipperary	3-25	34
8	Darragh Beirne	Mayo	5-18	33
9	Jamie Murphy	Meath	1-28	31
10	Jay O'Brien	Kildare	2-25	30
