= 1973–74 All-Ireland Senior Club Football Championship =

Irish Senior Club Football Championship

- Teams: 32
- Champions: University College Dublin (1st title); Paddy Kerr (captain)
- Runners-up: Clan na Gael

The 1973–74 All-Ireland Senior Club Football Championship was the fourth staging of the All-Ireland Senior Club Football Championship since its establishment by the Gaelic Athletic Association in 1970–71.

The defending champion was Nemo Rangers; however, the club did not qualify after losing to St Finbarr's in the 1973 Cork County Championship.

University College Dublin defeated Clan na Gael by 0–14 to 1–4 in the final replay at Croke Park on 28 April 1974 to win the competition. It was the club's first title.

== Munster ==
=== First round ===
16 December 1973 First round	Loughmore–Castleiney	3-08 - 2-04	Treaty Sarsfields	Páirc Shíleáin
	J Walshe 1-4, J Bourke 1-3, G Stapleton 1-0, J Treacy 0-1		J Ryan 1-3, S Fitzgerald 1-0, T Goodwin 0-1

16 December 1973 First round	University College Cork	0-14 - 0-05	Austin Stacks	The Mardyke
	B Lynch 0-8, D Kavanagh 0-2, S O'Shea 0-1, E O'Sullivan 0-1, N O'Sullivan 0-1, T Looney 0-1.		M Sheehy 0-3, T Kennington 0-1, B Curtin 0-1.

=== Semi-finals ===
23 December 1973 Semi-final	Loughmore-Castleiney	6-12 - 2-04	John Mitchels	Páirc Shíleáin

23 December 1973 Semi-final	Doonbeg	0-09 - 1-09	University College Cork	Páirc Uí Sheanacháin
	S Griffin 0-6, M Haugh 0-1, F McGrath 0-1, P O'Grady 0-1.		B Lynch 0-6, D Kavanagh 1-0, F Groarke 0-1, E O'Sullivan 0-1, S O'Shea 0-1.

=== Final ===
20 January 1974 Final	University College Cork	2-08 - 1-05	Loughmore–Castleiney	Bruff Sportsfield
	B Lynch 0-6, D Kavanagh 1-0, F Grourke 1-0, N Brosnan 0-2		J Healy 1-0, T Maher (L) 0-2, S Kearney 0-2, G Stapleton 0-1

== Semi-finals ==
10 March 1974 Semi-final	Clan na Gael	3-07 - 1-10	University College Cork	Davitt Park, Lurgan

10 March 1974 Semi-final	Knockmore	0-04 - 4-13	University College Dublin	James Stephens Park

== Final ==
18 March 1974 Final	University College Dublin	1-06 - 1-06	Clan na Gael	Croke Park

28 April 1974 Final replay	University College Dublin	0-14 - 1-04	Clan na Gael	Croke Park

== Finalists ==
UCD – 1974 All-Ireland Senior Club Football Champions (1st title)

Eugene McGee managed the winning team.

1. Ivan Heffernan
2. Michael Judge
3. Gareth O'Reilly
4. P. Gilroy
5. F. O'Donoghue
6. Éamonn O'Donoghue
7. Paddy Kerr (c)
8. Ollie Leddy
9. Benny Gaughran
10. Enda Condron
11. Kevin Kilmurray
12. Jackie Walsh
13. JP Kean
14. D. O'Connor
15. Pat Duggan

Played in drawn game:

P. J. O'Halloran
John O'Keeffe
Garrett O'Reilly
Joe Waldron

Other panel members:

Denis Moran?
Pat O'Neill

== Statistics ==
=== Miscellaneous ===
- University College Dublin won the Leinster Club SFC for the first time.
- Knockmore won the Connacht Club SFC title for the first time.
