= Jackie Walsh =

Kerry Gaelic footballer

Personal information
- Native name: Seánie Breathnach (Irish)
- Born: 1951 (age 74–75) Ballylongford, County Kerry, Ireland
- Occupation: Primary school teacher

Sport
- Sport: Gaelic football
- Position: Right corner-forward
Clubs
- Years: Club
- Ballylongford; Shannon Rangers
Club titles
- All-Ireland Titles: 1
Inter-county
Years	County	Apps (scores)
1971–1981	Kerry	6 (0–01)
Inter-county titles
- Munster titles: 4
- All-Irelands: 2
- NFL: 4
- All Stars: 0

Jackie Walsh (born 1951) is an Irish former Gaelic footballer. His league and championship career at senior level with the Kerry county team spanned twelve seasons from 1971 to 1981.

Born in Ballylongford, County Kerry, Walsh was born into a strong Gaelic football family. His father, Johnny Walsh, was a five-time All-Ireland medal winner with Kerry between 1932 and 1941. Walsh's brother, Barry, also played with Kerry.

Walsh first became involved in club football with Ballylongford. He won numerous divisional medals before later claiming a county senior championship medal with divisional side Shannon Rangers. Walsh claimed an All-Ireland medal with University College Dublin.

Walsh first came to prominence on the inter-county scene as a member of the Kerry under-21 team. He was captain of the team in 1972 and won a Munster medal before later ending up as an All-Ireland runner-up. By this stage he had also joined the Kerry senior team, making his debut during the 1970-71 league. Over the course of the next twelve seasons Walsh was a regular member of the panel at various times and won two All-Ireland medals in 1975 and 1980. He also won four Munster medals and four National Football League medals.
