= Paddy Lane =

Paddy Lane may refer to:

- Paddy Lane (cricketer) (1886–1937), Australian cricketer
- Paddy Lane (footballer) (born 2001), Northern Irish footballer
- Paddy Lane (politician) (1934–2012), Irish politician
