= 1974–75 All-Ireland Senior Club Football Championship =

Fifth staging of the All-Ireland Senior Club Football Championship

- Dates: 29 September 1974 – 16 March 1975
- Teams: 33
- Champions: University College Dublin (2nd title); Mick Carty (captain)
- Runners-up: Nemo Rangers; Jimmy Barrett (captain)

Tournament statistics
- Matches played: 36
- Goals scored: 81 (2.25 per match)
- Points scored: 509 (14.14 per match)
- Top scorer(s): Tony McTague (1–29)

The 1974–75 All-Ireland Senior Club Football Championship was the fifth staging of the All-Ireland Senior Club Football Championship since its establishment by the Gaelic Athletic Association in 1970–71. The competition ran from 29 September 1974 to 16 March 1975.

University College Dublin were the defending champions.

The All-Ireland final was played on 16 March 1975 at Croke Park in Dublin, between University College Dublin and Nemo Rangers, in what was their first ever championship meeting. University College Dublin won the match by 1–11 to 0–12 to claim their second consecutive All-Ireland title.

Ferbane's Tony McTague was the championship's top scorer with 1–29.

== Connacht ==
=== First round ===
10 November 1974 First round	Mountbellew	1–03 – 1–09	Roscommon Gaels	Páirc an Chreagáin
	T Mannion 1–1, J Heavey 0–1, F Rushe 0–1.		M McNamara 1–3, J O'Gara 0–2, P Shaughnessy 0–2, M McNeele 0–1, D Twomey 0–1.

=== Semi-finals ===
24 November 1974 Semi-final	Roscommon Gaels	2–12 – 0–02	Sheemore Gaels	Dr Hyde Park
	M McNamara 1–4, P O'Donnell 1–0, T Donnellan 0–3, J O'Gara 0–2, F Daly 0–1, P Shaughnessy 0–1, D Twomey 0–1.		P Leydon 0–2.

8 December 1974 Semi-final	St Patrick's	0–05 – 4–07	Garrymore	Markievicz Park
	J Kearins 0–2, M Kearins 0–2, PJ Clarke 0–1.		H Mannix 1–2, G Farragher 1–1, B Cunningham 1–1, M Walsh 1–0, J Nally 0–1, N Farragher 0–1, F Harty 0–1.

=== Final ===
9 February 1975 Final	Garrymore	0–11 – 0–11	Roscommon Gaels	Ballyhaunis Grounds
	M Cunningham 0–3, B Fitzpatrick 0–3, H Mannix 0–1, N Farragher 0–1, TJ Farragher 0–1, G Farragher 0–1, J Nally 0–1.		M McNamara 0–6, H Griffin 0–2, D Twomey 0–2, J O'Gara 0–1.

16 February 1975 Final replay	Roscommon Gaels	1–12 – 0–07	Garrymore	Castlerea Grounds
	M McNamara 0–6, P Shaughnessy 1–2, F Daly 0–2, J O'Gara 0–1, M McNeela 0–1.		B Fitzpatrick 0–4, D Dolan 0–1, N Farragher 0–1, F Harty 0–1.

== Leinster ==
=== First round ===
24 November 1974 First round	Summerhill	2–07 – 2–03	The Downs	Páirc Tailteann
	T Gibbons 1–3, P McElroy 1–0, N Byrne 0–2, P Thompson 0–1, M Kerrigan 0–1.		D Smyth 2–2, M Scally 0–1.

24 November 1974 First round	Ashford	0–06 – 2–11	Carbury	Ashford Grounds
	P Connor 0–2, M Quinn 0–1, P Henry 0–1, B Carthy 0–1, N Carthy 0–1.		J Jessop 1–1, K Kelly 1–1, M Moore 0–4, B Daly 0–2, M McKeever 0–1, J Carey 0–1, J McKeown 0–1.

24 November 1974 First round	St Kieran's	1–03 – 3–08	Kilanerin	Nowlan Park
	M Conway 1–0, S Comerford 0–2, R McNamara 0–1.		B Woodbyrne 2–0, J Hayden 1–2, P Cullen 0–2, P Hughes 0–2, J Cullen 0–1, S Boland 0–1.

24 November 1974 First round	The Heath	2–05 – 0–11	Ferbane	Fr Breen Park
	D Booth 1–2, J Hyland 1–0, S Doran 0–1, M Bergin 0–1, P Ging 0–1.		T McTague 0–9, S Lowry 0–2.

8 December 1974 First round replay	Ferbane	0–08 – 1–04	The Heath	O'Connor Park
	T McTague 0–6, R O'Loughlin 0–1, N Molloy 0–1.		M Berrigan 1–1, M Tracey 0–2, D Whelan 0–1.

=== Quarter-finals ===
8 December 1974 Quarter-final	Carbury	0–05 – 1–03	University College Dublin	St Conleth's Park
	M Moore 0–3, B Daly 0–1, K Connolly 0–1.		G McCaul 1–0, P Duggan 0–2, JP Kean 0–1.

8 December 1974 Quarter-final	Kilanerin	2–07 – 3–09	Éire Óg	Páirc Uí Shíocháin
	B Cullen 1–0, B Woodbyrne 1–0, P Hughes 0–3, P Cullen 0–2, M Byrne 0–1, S Boland 0–1.		P Connolly 1–5, T Rea 2–0, T Geoghegan 0–1, R Moore 0–1, J Kenny 0–1, B Hennessy 0–1.

8 December 1974 Quarter-final	Summerhill	3–07 – 1–03	Newtown Blues	Páirc Tailteann
	T Gibbons 2–3, P McElroy 1–1, N Byrne 0–1, B Keogh 0–1, M Kerrigan 0–1.		P Judge 1–0, J Henratty 0–2, K Judge 0–1.

15 December 1974 Quarter-final	Ferbane	4–12 – 0–04	Mostrim	O'Connor Park
	E Lowry 2–0, T McTague 1–3, R O'Loughlin 1–1, D Kelly 0–4, H Healy 0–2, S Lowry 0–2.		P Kearney 0–2, G Madden 0–2.

=== Semi-finals ===
12 January 1975 Semi-final	Ferbane	1–08 – 1–04	Summerhill	O'Connor Park
	T McTague 0–5, P Doyle 1–0, D Kelly 0–1, K Kenny 0–1, E Lowry 0–1.		T Gibbons 1–1, P Gray 0–3.

12 January 1975 Semi-final	Éire Óg	0–06 – 2–13	University College Dublin	Dr Cullen Park
	S Moloney 0–2, T Rea 0–1, B Hennessy 0–1, P Connolly 0–1, J Kenny 0–1.		J Walsh 0–8, O Leddy 1–2, JP Kean B Walsh 0–2, B Dunleavy 0–1.

=== Final ===
26 January 1975 Final	University College Dublin	2–07 – 1–09	Ferbane	Croke Park
	J Walsh 2–1, B Walsh 0–4, K Kilmurray 0–1, B Hennigan 0–1.		T McTague 0–6, E Lowry 1–0, D Kelly 0–2, K Kenny 0–1.

== Munster ==
=== First round ===
24 November 1974 First round	Ardfinnan	0–07 – 0–10	Doonbeg	Clonmel Sportsground
	M Keating 0–2, J Cummins 0–1, Pat Savage 0–1, Peter Savage 0–1, E O'Gorman 0–1, P Ryan 0–1.		S Griffin 0–4, J Clancy 0–2, M Killeen 0–2, S Whelan 0–1, E O'Neill 0–1.

15 December 1974 First round	Nemo Rangers	4–15 – 0–01	Treaty Sarsfields	The Mardyke
	C Murphy 1–3, K Collins 0–6, S Coughlan 1–1, N Morgan 0–4, S Leydon 1–0, L Good 1–0, D Murphy 0–1.		M Bromell 0–1.

=== Semi-finals ===
15 December 1974 Semi-final	Affane	0–06 – 2–22	Austin Stacks	Cappoquin Sportsfield
	J Troy 0–2, S Brackett 0–1, M Hackett 0–1, P Denn 0–1, F Power 0-1.		M Sheehy 1–8, JL Barrett 1–2, G Power 0–5, T Kennington 0–4, J O'Keeffe 0–2, J Power 0–1.

22 December 1974 Semi-final	Nemo Rangers	3–06 – 0–04	Doonbeg	Páirc na nGael
	J Barrett 2–0, N Morgan 1–0, S Coughlan 0–3, K Collins 0–2, C Murphy 0–1.		F McGrath 0–1, J Killeen 0–1, E O'Neill 0–1, S Griffin 0–1.

=== Final ===
19 January 1975 Final	Nemo Rangers	2–06 – 1–07	Austin Stacks	Gaelic Grounds
	C Murphy 1–1, S Coughlan 1–0, M O'Donoghue 0–3, K Murphy 0–1, J Barrett 0–1.		M Sheehy 1–3, J Power 0–1, G Power 0–1, T Kennington 0–1, T Sheehan 0–1.

== Ulster ==
=== First round ===
29 September 1974 First round	Glasgow	1–07 – 4–11	Clan na Gael	Glasgow
				Referee: B Treanor (Down)

13 October 1974 First round	Ramor United	1–04 – 2–06	Ballinderry	Breffni Park
	A Connell 1–0, M Mulvanney 0–2, P Tobin 0–1, T McCreesh 0–1.		G McIvor 1–1, S McIvor 1–0, B Rocks 0–3, O McCuskar 0–1, P McGuckin 0–1.

=== Quarter-finals ===
29 September 1974 Quarter-final	St Joseph's	0–08 – 0–12	Teemore Shamrocks	Fr Tierney Park
	M Carney 0–2, S Granaghan 0–2, K Blake 0–2, P Barry 0–1, M Melly 0-1.		A Burke 0–4, S McBrien 0–3, B Reilly 0–2, P Fitzpatrick 0–1, S Quinn 0–1, J Cox 0–1.

13 October 1974 Quarter-final	Bryansford	1–09 – 0–04	Erin's Own, Cargin	St Patrick's Park
				Referee: J Murray (Monaghan)

13 October 1974 Quarter-final	Clan na Gael	2–02 – 0–05	Scotstown	Davitt Park
	T McCaughey 1–2, S McNiece 1–0.		A Cadden 0–2, C Morgan 0–2, L Stirrat 0–1.	Referee: S Gribben (Down)

27 October 1974 Quarter-final	Ballinderry	1–07 – 1–07	Trillick	Rossa Park
	S McIvor 1–0, B Rocks 0–2, J Rocks 0–2, D McCuskon 0–1, P McGuckian 0–1, F McIbor 0–1.		P King 0–7, I McGread 1–0.

10 November 1974 Quarter-final replay	Trillick	2–06 – 1–05	Ballinderry	Healy Park
	J McGrade 1–2, T Donnelly 1–0, P King 0–2, R Cassidy 0–1, V Keenan 0–1.		E McIvor 1–0, JJ Rocks 0–2, P McGuckin 0–1, S McIvor 0–1, P McGuckin 0–1.

=== Semi-finals ===
27 October 1974 Semi-final	Bryansford	1–05 – 1–07	Clan na Gael	Clonduff Park
	W Kane 1–3, D McNamara 0–1, F Grant 0–1.		T McCaughey 0–6, E Kelly 1–0, J McKenna 0–1.

24 November 1974 Semi-final	Trillick	0–08 – 0–05	Teemore Shamrocks	Healy Park
	P King 0–3, B Donnelly 0–2, J McGrade 0–1, T Donnelly 0–1, V Keenan 0–1.		S Reilly 0–2, B Reilly 0–1, G Reilly 0–1, S Quinn 0–1.

=== Final ===
8 December 1974 Final	Trillick	1–04 – 1–07	Clan na Gael	Healy Park
	B Donnelly 1–0, P King 0–3, T Donnelly 0–1.		T McCaughey 0–4, E Kelly 1–0, J Smyth 0–2, T McCoughley 0–1.

== Semi-finals ==
23 February 1975 Semi-final	Roscommon Gaels	1–02 – 0–12	University College Dublin	Dr Hyde Park
	P O'Shaughnessy 1–0, J O'Gara 0–1, M McNamara 0–1.		JP Keane 0–4, J Walsh 0–3, E O'Donoghue 0–2, P Kerr 0–2, P O'Neill 0–1.

23 February 1975 Semi-final	Nemo Rangers	1–03 – 1–03	Clan na Gael	The Mardyke
	D Murphy 1–0, J Barrett 0–1, S Leydon 0–1, C Murphy 0–1.		N O'Hahan 1–0, M O'Neill 0–1, C McKinstry 0–1, O Crewe 0–1.

9 March 1975 Semi-final replay	Clan na Gael	0–06 – 2–05	Nemo Rangers	The Playing Fields
	J McKenna 0–2, S O'Hagan 0–2, N O'Hagan 0–1, J McKerr 0–1.		N Morgan 1–1, C Murphy 1–0, M O'Donoghue 0–1, J Barrett 0–1, K Collins 0–1, S Coughlan 0–1.

=== Final ===
16 March 1975 Final	University College Dublin	1–11 – 0–12	Nemo Rangers	Croke Park
	J Walsh 0–6, JP Kean 1–0, B Walsh 0–2, M Carty 0–1, P Duggan 0–1, P O'Neill 0–1.		S Leydon 0–3, S Coughlan 0–2, C Murphy 0–2, L Good 0–2, K Collins 0–2, J Barrett 0–1.	Referee: P. J. McGrath (Mayo)

== Statistics ==
=== Top scorers ===
Rank	Player	Club	Tally	Total	Matches	Average
1	Tony McTague	Ferbane	1–29	32	5	6.40
2	Michael McNamara	Roscommon Gaels	2–20	26	5	5.20
3	Jackie Walsh	UCD	2–18	24	4	6.00
4	Tom Gibbons	Summerhill	4–07	19	3	6.33
5	Colm Murphy	Nemo Rangers	3–08	17	6	2.83
5	Mikey Sheehy	Austin Stacks	2–11	17	2	8.50

=== Miscellaneous ===
- University College Dublin became the first team to win consecutive Leinster Club SFC titles.
- Clan na Gael became the first team to win three consecutive Ulster Club SFC titles.
- Roscommon Gaels won the Connacht Club SFC title for the first time.
