= Gerry Carroll (Gaelic footballer) =

Irish former sportsman

Personal information
- Native name: Gearóid Ó Cearúill (Irish)
- Born: 16 July 1958 (age 68) Edenderry, County Offaly, Ireland
- Occupation: Company representative
- Height: 6 ft 0 in (183 cm)

Sport
- Sport: Gaelic football
- Position: Centre-forward
Club
- Years: Club
- Edenderry
Club titles
- Offaly titles: 1
Inter-county
Years	County	Apps (scores)
1976–1986	Offaly	29 (4–21)
Inter-county titles
- Leinster titles: 3
- All-Irelands: 1
- NFL: 0
- All Stars: 0

Gerry Carroll (born 16 July 1958 in Edenderry, County Offaly) is an Irish former sportsman. He played Gaelic football with his local club Edenderry and was a member of the Offaly senior county team from 1977 until 1986.

He later moved to the United States, from where he was interviewed for the documentary Players of the Faithful.
