= 1974 All-Ireland Under-21 Football Championship =

Gaelic football competition

Championship details

All-Ireland Champions
- Winning team: Mayo (2nd win)
- Captain: John Culkin

All-Ireland Finalists
- Losing team: Antrim

Provincial Champions
- Munster: Cork
- Leinster: Dublin
- Ulster: Antrim
- Connacht: Mayo

The 1974 All-Ireland Under-21 Football Championship was the 11th staging of the All-Ireland Under-21 Football Championship since its establishment by the Gaelic Athletic Association in 1964.

Kerry entered the championship as defending champions, however, they were defeated by Cork in the Munster final.

On 29 September 1974, Mayo won the championship following a 2-10 to 2-8 defeat of Antrim in a replay of the All-Ireland final. This was their second All-Ireland title overall and their first in seven championship seasons.

== Results ==
=== All-Ireland Under-21 Football Championship ===
Semi-finals

| 25 August 1974 Semi-final | Dublin | 2-07 - 1-11 | Mayo | Croke Park, Dublin |

| 25 August 1974 Semi-final | Antrim | 3-11 - 3-06 | Cork | Corrigan Park, Belfast |

Finals

| 8 September 1974 Final | Mayo | 0-09 - 0-09 | Antrim | Croke Park, Dublin |
| | | | | Referee: G.Hoey (Louth) |

| 29 September 1974 Final replay | Mayo | 2-10 - 2-08 | Antrim | Croke Park, Dublin |

== Statistics ==
=== Miscellaneous ===
- Dublin win the Leinster title for the first time in their history.
- The All-Ireland final ends in a draw and goes to a replay for the first time.
