= UCD GAA =

University sports club in Dublin, Ireland

- CLG An Coláiste Ollscoile
- Founded: 1900
- County: Dublin
- Nickname: The Students
- Colours: St. Patrick's blue, navy and yellow
- Grounds: Belfield
- Coordinates: 53°18′16.48″N 6°13′02.06″W

Playing kits
Standard colours

Senior Club Championships
	All Ireland	Leinster champions	Dublin champions
Football:	2	2	6
Hurling:	0	0	8
Camogie:	0	1	3

UCD GAA or University College Dublin Gaelic Athletic Association club is a Dublin based Gaelic games club in University College Dublin. The UCD hurling club was founded in 1900 and boasted the mottos "Ad Astra" and "Cothrom Féinne". The first team was an amalgamation of students from UCD and Cecilia St. Although UCD had been playing Gaelic football unofficially since 1900, the official club history began in the season of 1911/1912.

The football club competes in the Sigerson Cup and Higher Education Leagues as well as in the Dublin Senior Football Championship and the O'Byrne Cup. The hurling club competes in the Fitzgibbon Cup and Higher Education Leagues and occasionally in the Dublin Senior Hurling Championship and the Walsh Cup. The Camogie Club competes in the Ashbourne Cup. The ladies Gaelic football team competes in the O'Connor Cup.

Former Dublin footballer Brian Mullins was the director of Sports at UCD. * Ger Brennan & Josh Warde are currently in charge of all Gaelic games on the UCD campus.

== Hurling ==
UCD won the Leinster Senior Hurling Championship and the All-Ireland representing Dublin as the Collegians in 1917. In the all-Ireland final, the Collegians beat Boherlahan of Tipperary by a score-line of 5–4 to 4–2 at Croke Park. The attendance was 11,000. The Collegians all-Ireland winning team were: T. Daly, J. Ryan, S. Hyde, S. O’Donavon, H. Burke, C. Stuart, J. Phelan, B. Mockler, T. Moore, J. Cleary, F. Burke, M. Neville, M. Hackett, M. Hayes, P. Kenefick. Sub: B. Considine.

More recently, UCD won the 2000, 2004 and 2005 Dublin Senior Hurling Championships and reached the Leinster Senior Club Hurling Championship final on each occasion but were defeated by narrow margins.

In 2004, UCD won the Walsh Cup for the first time when they convincingly beat reigning All-Ireland champions, Kilkenny, by 2–16 to 0–5.

UCD last won the Fitzgibbon Cup in 2001 when they were captained by David Hegarty (Clare). They defeated UCC in the final. Team: Matty White, Robbie Kirwan, DOC O'Connor, Brian Walton, Colm Everard, David Hegarty, Hugh Flannery, Gary Mernagh, Stephen Lucey, Pat Fitzgerald, Sean O'Neill, Redmond Barry, Brendan Murphy, Alan Barry, John Culkin.

=== Honours ===
Competition	Wins	Years won	Last final lost
Fitzgibbon Cup	30	1912, 1915, 1916, 1917, 1923, 1927, 1932, 1934, 1935, 1936, 1938, 1941, 1944, 1948, 1950, 1951, 1952, 1958, 1960, 1961, 1964, 1965, 1968, 1969, 1975, 1978, 1979, 1993, 2001.	2006
All-Ireland Senior Hurling Championship	1	1917	
Leinster Senior Hurling Championship	1	1917	
Leinster Senior Club Hurling Championship	0	—N/a	2005
Dublin Senior Hurling Championship	8	1934, 1947, 1948, 1961, 1968, 2000, 2004, 2005	1965
Dublin Under 21 Hurling Championship	3	1969, 1976, 2001	
Walsh Cup	1	2004	
Ashbourne Cup	36	1915, 1916, 1918, 1921, 1933, 1935, 1938, 1939, 1940, 1941, 1942, 1946, 1950, 1952, 1953, 1954, 1955, 1958, 1959, 1960, 1961, 1962, 1966, 1969, 1970, 1971, 1980, 1981, 1982, 1983, 1984, 1986, 1987, 1988, 2007, 2008	

=== Notable players ===
- Oisín Gough
- David Hegarty
- Stephen Lucey
- Nicky Rackard
- Noel McGrath
- Brendan Murphy
- David O'Callaghan
- David O'Connor
- Liam Rushe
- Cillian Buckley
- Tadhg de Búrca
- Seamus Flanagan

== Football ==
=== Honours ===
Competition	Wins	Years won	Last final lost
Sigerson Cup	32	1911, 1915, 1916, 1917, 1920, 1923, 1926, 1928, 1929, 1930, 1931, 1932, 1935, 1944, 1945, 1947, 1949, 1953, 1955, 1956, 1957, 1959, 1961, 1968, 1973, 1974, 1975, 1977, 1978, 1979, 1985, 1996, 2016	2004
All-Ireland Senior Club Football Championship	2	1974, 1975	—N/a
Leinster Senior Club Football Championship	2	1973–74, 1974–75	—N/a
Dublin Senior Football Championship	6	1963, 1965, 1973, 1974, 2002, 2006	1976
Dublin Under 21 Football Championship	6	1968, 1969, 1971, 1999, 2000, 2001	
O'Connor Cup	6	2001, 2001, 2003, 2005, 2006, 2016	

=== Notable players ===
- Brian Dooher
- Cormac McAnallen
- Tony McManus
- Brian Mullins
- Seán Murphy
- Kieran Denvir
- Paddy O'Brien
- John O'Keeffe
- Colm O'Rourke
- Kevin Kilmurray
- Stephen Coen
- John Heslin
- Brian Fenton
- Jack McCaffrey
- Paul Mannion
- Trevor Giles
- John Hegarty
- Con O'Callaghan
- Niall McNamee
- Cormac Egan
- Kevin Moran
- Gerry McEntee

== Ladies Football ==
=== Notable players ===
- Rena Buckley
- Sinéad Goldrick
- Noëlle Healy
- Nicola Ward

== Camogie ==
=== Notable players ===
- Rena Buckley
- Mary Leacy
- Mags Darcy
- Agnes Hourigan
- Agnes O'Farrelly

== See also ==
- Seán Boylan
