= Leinster Under-20 Football Championship =

Annual Gaelic football competition

- Current season or competition: 2026 Leinster Under-20 Football Championship
- Irish: Craobh Peile Laighean Fé-20
- Code: Gaelic football
- Founded: 1964; 62 years ago
- Region: Leinster (GAA)
- Trophy: Flood Cup
- No. of teams: 11
- Title holders: Kildare (14th title)
- Most titles: Dublin (16 titles)
- Sponsors: EirGrid
- TV partner: TG4
- Official website: Leinster GAA website

The Leinster GAA Football Under-20 Championship, known simply as the Leinster Under-20 Championship, is an annual inter-county Gaelic football competition organised by the Leinster Council of the Gaelic Athletic Association (GAA). It is the highest inter-county football competition for male players between the ages of 17 and 20 in the province of Leinster. The championship was contested as the Leinster Under-21 Championship between 1964 and 2016 before changing to an under-20 age category from 2018. It is sponsored by EirGrid.

The final, currently held in July, serves as the culmination of a series of games played during a five to six-week period, and the results determine which team receives the Flood Cup. The championship has usually been played on a straight knockout basis whereby once a team loses they are eliminated from the championship.

The Leinster Championship is an integral part of the wider GAA Football Under-20 All-Ireland Championship. The winners of the Leinster final, like their counterparts in the other three provinces, advance to the semi-final stage of the All-Ireland series of games.

Eleven teams currently participate in the Leinster Championship, with Kilkenny remaining the only county not to field a team. The title has been won at least once by eight teams, with seven of these winning the title more than once.

== Current format ==
=== Overview ===
The Leinster Championship is a single elimination tournament. Each team is afforded only one defeat before being eliminated from the championship. Pairings for matches are drawn at random and there is currently no seeding. Each match is played as a single leg. If a match is drawn there is a period of extra time, however, if both sides are still level at the end of extra time a replay takes place and so on until a winner is found.

=== Progression ===
	Teams entering in this round	Teams advancing from previous round
First round (6 teams)	6 teams drawn at random	
Quarter-finals (8 teams)	5 teams who receive a bye at random	3 winners from the first round
Semi-finals (4 teams)		5 winners from the quarter-finals
Final (2 teams)		2 winners from the semi-finals

=== Qualification for subsequent competitions ===
The Leinster Championship winners gain automatic entry to the semi-final stage of the All-Ireland Championship. Unlike, the hurling counterpart, there is no "back-door" for the runners-up.

== Managers ==
Managers in the Leinster Championship are involved in the day-to-day running of the team, including the training, team selection, and sourcing of players from the club championships. Their influence varies from county-to-county and is related to the individual county boards. The manager is assisted by a team of two or three selectors and an extensive backroom team consisting of various coaches. The under-20 team manager also works closely with the senior team manager due to an overlap of players on both teams. Prior to the development of the concept of a manager in the 1970s, teams were usually managed by a team of selectors with one member acting as chairman.

Winning managers (1970–present)
Manager	Team	Wins	Winning years
Dessie Farrell	Dublin	4	2014, 2015, 2016, 2017
Jim Gavin	Dublin	3	2009, 2010, 2012
Frank Lynch	Louth	3	1970, 1978, 1981
Luke Dempsey	Westmeath	2	1999, 2000
Paddy Canning	Dublin	2	2002, 2005
Seán Dempsey	Laois	2	2006, 2007
Tom Gray	Dublin	2	2019, 2020
Brian Flanagan	Kildare	2	2022, 2023
Paul Kenny	Meath	1	2001
Tommy Lyons	Dublin	1	2003
Peadar Mac Canann	Kildare	1	2004
Glenn Ryan	Kildare	1	2008
Kevin Kehoe	Wexford	1	2011
Kieran McGeeney	Kildare	1	2013
Davy Burke	Kildare	1	2018
Declan Kelly	Offaly	1	2021
Cathal O'Bric	Meath	1	2024
Fergal Reel	Louth	1	2025

== Roll of honour ==
#	County	Titles	Runners-up	Years won	Years runners-up
1	Dublin	16	10	1974, 1975, 1980, 1984, 2002, 2003, 2005, 2009, 2010, 2012, 2014, 2015, 2016, 2017, 2019, 2020	1976, 1992, 1993, 1998, 2001, 2004, 2018, 2021, 2022, 2023
2	Kildare	14	8	1965, 1966, 1967, 1972, 1976, 1983, 1992, 2004, 2008, 2013, 2018, 2022, 2023, 2026	1973, 1977, 1980, 1985, 1989, 2005, 2015, 2016
3	Meath	9	6	1985, 1989, 1990, 1991, 1993, 1996, 1997, 2001, 2024	1971, 1987, 1994, 2000, 2014, 2025
3	Offaly	9	7	1968, 1971, 1973, 1977, 1979, 1986, 1988, 1995, 2021	1964, 1965, 1970, 1972, 1978, 2007, 2017
5	Laois	8	6	1964, 1969, 1982, 1987, 1994, 1998, 2006, 2007	1975, 1986, 1999, 2009, 2019, 2020
6	Louth	4	4	1970, 1978, 1981, 2025	1979, 1983, 1996, 2012, 2024, 2026
7	Westmeath	2	3	1999, 2000	1995, 1997, 2010
8	Wexford	1	4	2011	1968, 1974, 1988, 2008
9	Longford	0	7	-	1966, 1981, 1982, 2003, 2006, 2011, 2013
9	Wicklow	0	5	-	1967, 1969, 1990, 1991, 2002
9	Carlow	0	1	-	1984

== List of finals ==
Year	Winner	Score	Opponent	Score	Winning Captain
2026	Kildare	0-23	Louth	1-18	Ben Ryan/Colm Moran
2025	Louth	2-19	Meath	1-15	Seán Callaghan
2024	Meath	3-13	Louth	0-12	Liam Kelly
2023	Kildare	0-16 aet	Dublin	0-13	Harry O'Neill/Shane Farrell
2022	Kildare	0-17	Dublin	0-15	Aaron Browne
2021	Offaly	0-15	Dublin	3-03	Kieran Dolan
2020	Dublin	0-18	Laois	0-08	Rory Dwyer
2019	Dublin	4-18	Laois	0-17	James Doran
2018	Kildare	1-15	Dublin	0-10	Aaron Masterson
2017	Dublin	2-14	Offaly	0-08	Con O'Callaghan/Cillian O'Shea
2016	Dublin	2-14	Kildare	0-17	Andrew Foley/Eoin Murchan
2015	Dublin	3-10	Kildare	1-12	David Byrne
2014	Dublin	0-15	Meath	0-10	Jack McCaffrey
2013	Kildare	1-12	Longford	0-12	Tommy Moolick
2012	Dublin	1-16	Louth	0-08	Kevin O'Brien
2011	Wexford	1-09	Longford	0-11	James Breen
2010	Dublin	1-12	Westmeath	0-09	Jonny Cooper
2009	Dublin	0-12	Laois	0-09	Cian O'Sullivan
2008	Kildare	0-10	Wexford	0-06	Gary White
2007	Laois	0-13	Offaly	1-07	Cahir Healy
2006	Laois	0-09	Longford	0-07	Peter McNulty
2005	Dublin	0-13	Kildare	0-11	Bryan Cullen
2004	Kildare	1-10	Dublin	0-12	Andrew McLoughlin
2003	Dublin	3-13	Longford	1-06	Alan Brogan
2002	Dublin	1-17	Wicklow	2-04	Barry Cahill
2001	Meath	0-10	Dublin	0-05	David Gallagher
2000	Westmeath	0-07	Meath	0-06	Dessie Dolan
1999	Westmeath	1-09	Laois	0-10	Aidan Canning
1998	Laois	1-13	Dublin	1-07	Ian Fitzgerald
1997	Meath	1-11	Westmeath	0-07	Darren Fay
1996	Meath	1-08	Louth	0-08	Trevor Giles
1995	Offaly	0-14	Westmeath	0-08	Mel Keenaghan
1994	Laois	1-17	Meath	1-13	Hugh Emerson
1993	Meath	2-11	Dublin	2-09	Tommy Hanley
1992	Kildare	2-12	Dublin	0-09	Eric Dockery
1991	Meath	0-09	Wicklow	1-05	Peadar McCaffrey
1990	Meath	1-14	Wicklow	0-06	John Brady
1989	Meath	2-05	Kildare	0-09	Barry Ferguson
1988	Offaly	2-07	Wexford	2-05	Garrett O'Brien
1987	Laois	1-12	Meath	1-08	John Bolton
1986	Offaly	1-10	Laois	0-09	Brendan Flynn
1985	Meath	2-07	Kildare	0-12	Robbie O'Malley
1984	Dublin	0-09	Carlow	1-05	Eamon Heery
1983	Kildare	1-13	Louth	1-08	Kevin Nolan
1982	Laois	2-11	Longford	0-03	Michael Drennan
1981	Louth	2-08	Longford	0-06	Pat McConnon
1980	Dublin	0-10	Kildare	0-08	Mick Loftus
1979	Offaly	4-14	Louth	5-04	Brendan Lowry
1978	Louth	2-08	Offaly	2-07	Brendan Byrne
1977	Offaly	0-12	Kildare	0-04	Charlie Conroy
1976	Kildare	1-12	Dublin	0-09	Brendan Whelan
1975	Dublin	0-12	Laois	1-06	Tony Fayne
1974	Dublin	1-10	Wexford	0-08	
1973	Offaly	3-08	Kildare	3-06	Charlie Quinn
1972	Kildare	2-09 (R)	Offaly	0-06 (R)	Denis Dalton
1971	Offaly	1-09	Meath	0-11	Liam Hanlon
1970	Louth	2-13	Offaly	3-09	Terry Lennon
1969	Laois	2-07	Wicklow	2-06	Tim Clancy
1968	Offaly	2-13	Wexford	0-07	Eugene Mulligan
1967	Kildare	3-11	Wicklow	0-04	Pat Mangan
1966	Kildare	4-14	Longford	2-05	Pat Dunny
1965	Kildare	1-11	Offaly	0-10	Pat Dunny
1964	Laois	1-08	Offaly	0-08	Jim Leonard

== Records and statistics ==
=== Final ===
==== Team ====
- Most titles: 16:
  - Dublin (1974, 1975, 1980, 1984, 2002, 2003, 2005, 2009, 2010, 2012, 2014, 2015, 2016, 2017, 2019, 2020)
- Most consecutive title wins: 4:
  - Dublin (2014, 2015, 2016, 2017)
- Most appearances in a final: 23:
  - Dublin (1974, 1975, 1986, 1980, 1984, 1992, 1993, 1998, 2001, 2002, 2003, 2004, 2005, 2009, 2010, 2012, 2014, 2015, 2016, 2017, 2018, 2019, 2020)
- Most appearances in a final without winning: 7:
  - Longford (1966, 1981, 1982, 2003, 2006, 2011, 2013)

=== Teams ===
==== By decade ====
The most successful team of each decade, judged by number of Leinster Championship titles, is as follows:

- 1960s: 3 for Kildare (1965–66-67)
- 1970s: 4 for Offaly (1971-73-77-79)
- 1980s: 2 each for Dublin (1980–84), Laois (1982–87), Meath (1985–89) and Offaly (1986–89)
- 1990s: 5 for Meath (1990-91-93-96-97)
- 2000s: 4 for Dublin (2002-03-05-09)
- 2010s: 7 for Dublin (2010-12-14-15-16-17-19)

==== Gaps ====
Top three longest gaps between successive championship titles:

- 26 years: Offaly (1995-2021)
- 23 years: Meath (2001-2024)
- 18 years: Dublin (1984-2002)
