= James Mahon (hurler) =

Irish hurler (born 2005)

Personal information
- Native name: Séamus Mac Mathúna (Irish)
- Born: 2005 (age 20–21) Kilcormac, County Offaly, Ireland
- Occupation: Student

Sport
- Sport: Hurling
- Position: Left wing-back
Club
- Years: Club
- 2023-present: Kilcormac–Killoughey
Club titles
- Offaly titles: 1
College
- Years: College
- 2023-present: TUS Midwest
College titles
- Fitzgibbon titles: 0
Inter-county
- Years: County
- 2025-: Offaly
Inter-county titles
- Leinster titles: 0
- All-Irelands: 0
- NHL: 0
- All Stars: 0

James Mahon (born 2005) is an Irish hurler. At club level he plays with Kilcormac–Killoughey and at inter-county level with the Offaly senior hurling team.

== Career ==
Mahon played hurling as a student at Coláiste Naomh Cormac. He lined out for when the senior team when the school beat Hamilton High School to claim the All-Ireland PPS SBHC title in 2023. Mahon's performances for the school resulted in his inclusion on the combined Offaly Schools team which also won the Leinster PPS SAHC in 2023. He has also been included on the TUS Midwest Fitzgibbon Cup team.

After progressing through the juvenile and underage ranks with the Kilcormac–Killoughey club, Mahon made his senior team debut in 2023. He ended the season with an Offaly SBHC medal after 0–12 to 0–08 defeat of Clodiagh Gaels in the final. Mahon added an Offaly SHC medal to his collection in 2024, after lining out in the two-point defeat of Ballinamere.

Mahon first appeared on the inter-county scene for Offaly as a member of the minor team. His last game in the grade was a one-point defeat by Tipperary in the 2022 All-Ireland minor final. Mahon immediately progressed to the under-20 team in 2023 and was at full-back when Offaly lost the 2023 All-Ireland under-20 final to Cork. He collected an All-Ireland U20HC winners' medal after beating Tipperary by 2–20 to 2–14 in the All-Ireland final.

Mahon made his senior team debut in a 2–26 to 0-17 National Hurling League defeat of Antrim in February 2025.

== Honours ==
Coláiste Naomh Cormac

- All-Ireland PPS Senior C Hurling Championship: 2022
- Leinster PPS Senior C Hurling Championship: 2022
- All-Ireland PPS Senior B Hurling Championship: 2023
- Leinster PPS Senior B Hurling Championship: 2023

Offaly Schools

- Leinster PPS Senior A Hurling Championship: 2023

Kilcormac–Killoughey

- Offaly Senior Hurling Championship: 2024
- Offaly Senior B Hurling Championship: 2023

Offaly

- All-Ireland Under-20 Hurling Championship: 2024
- Leinster Under-20 Hurling Championship: 2023, 2024
- Leinster Minor Hurling Championship: 2022
