= Ter Guinan =

Irish hurler (born 2005)

Personal information
- Native name: Toirealach Ó Coinneáin (Irish)
- Born: 2005 (age 20–21) Kilcormac, County Offaly, Ireland
- Occupation: Student

Sport
- Sport: Hurling
- Position: Left wing-back
Club
- Years: Club
- 2023-present: Kilcormac–Killoughey
Club titles
- Offaly titles: 1
College
- Years: College
- 2023-present: University of Galway
College titles
- Fitzgibbon titles: 0
Inter-county
- Years: County
- 2025-: Offaly
Inter-county titles
- Leinster titles: 0
- All-Irelands: 0
- NHL: 0
- All Stars: 0

Ter Guinan (born 2005) is an Irish hurler. At club level he plays with Kilcormac–Killoughey and at inter-county level with the Offaly senior hurling team.

== Career ==
Guinan played hurling and Gaelic football as a student at Coláiste Choilm in Tullamore. His performances for the school resulted in his inclusion on the combined Offaly Schools team which won the Leinster PPS SAHC title in 2023. Guinan has also been included on the University of Galway Fitzgibbon Cup team.

After progressing through the juvenile and underage ranks with the Kilcormac–Killoughey club, Guinan made his senior team debut in 2023. He ended the season with an Offaly SBHC medal after 0–12 to 0–08 defeat of Clodiagh Gaels in the final. Guinan added an Offaly SHC medal to his collection in 2024, after lining out in the two-point defeat of Ballinamere.

Guinan first appeared on the inter-county scene for Offaly as a member of the minor team. His last game in the grade was a one-point defeat by Tipperary in the 2022 All-Ireland minor final. Guinan immediately progressed to the under-20 team in 2023 and was at left wing-back when Offaly lost the 2023 All-Ireland under-20 final to Cork. He collected an All-Ireland U20HC winners' medal after beating Tipperary by 2–20 to 2–14 in the All-Ireland final.

Guinan joined the Offaly senior hurling team in 2025.

== Honours ==
Offaly Schools

- Leinster PPS Senior A Hurling Championship: 2023

Kilcormac–Killoughey

- Offaly Senior Hurling Championship: 2024
- Offaly Senior B Hurling Championship: 2023

Offaly

- All-Ireland Under-20 Hurling Championship: 2024
- Leinster Under-20 Hurling Championship: 2023, 2024
- Leinster Minor Hurling Championship: 2022
