= Brecon Kavanagh =

Irish hurler (born 2005)

Personal information
- Native name: Brecon Caomhánach (Irish)
- Born: 2005 (age 20–21) Kilcormac, County Offaly, Ireland

Sport
- Sport: Hurling
- Position: Centre-back
Club
- Years: Club
- 2023-present: Kilcormac–Killoughey
Club titles
- Offaly titles: 1
Inter-county
- Years: County
- 2024-: Offaly
Inter-county titles
- Leinster titles: 0
- All-Irelands: 0
- NHL: 0
- All Stars: 0

Brecon Kavanagh (born 2005) is an Irish hurler. At club level he plays with Kilcormac–Killoughey and at inter-county level with the Offaly senior hurling team.

== Career ==
Kavanagh first played hurling to a high standard as a student at Coláiste Naomh Cormac. He was part of the school team that beat Hamilton High School to claim the All-Ireland PPS SBHC title in 2023. Kavangh's performances for the school resulted in his inclusion on the combined Offaly Schools team which also won the Leinster PPS SAHC in 2023.

After progressing through the juvenile and underage ranks with the Kilcormac–Killoughey club, Kavangh made his senior team debut in 2023. He ended the season with an Offaly SHC medal.

Kavangh first appeared on the inter-county scene during a two-year tenure with the Offaly minor hurling team. His last game in the grade was a defeat by Tipperary in the 2022 All-Ireland minor final. Kavangh immediately progressed to the under-20 team that lost the 2023 All-Ireland under-20 final to Cork. He collected a winners' medal in that competition the following year after beating Tipperary by 2–20 to 2–14 in the All-Ireland final.

Kavangh earned a call-up to the senior team's extended panel for the defeat of Laois in the 2024 Joe McDonagh Cup final.

== Honours ==
Coláiste Naomh Cormac

- All-Ireland PPS Senior C Hurling Championship: 2022
- Leinster PPS Senior C Hurling Championship: 2022
- All-Ireland PPS Senior B Hurling Championship: 2023
- Leinster PPS Senior B Hurling Championship: 2023

Offaly Schools

- Leinster PPS Senior A Hurling Championship: 2023

University of Limerick

- Higher Education Freshers 1 Hurling League: 2023

Kilcormac–Killoughey

- Offaly Senior Hurling Championship: 2023

Offaly

- Joe McDonagh Cup: 2024
- All-Ireland Under-20 Hurling Championship: 2024
- Leinster Under-20 Hurling Championship: 2023, 2024
- Leinster Minor Hurling Championship: 2022
