= Colin Spain =

Irish hurler (born 2004)

Personal information
- Native name: Cóilín de Spáinn (Irish)
- Born: 2004 (age 21–22) Kilcormac, County Offaly, Ireland
- Occupation: Student

Sport
- Sport: Hurling
- Position: Midfield
Club
- Years: Club
- 2022-present: Kilcormac–Killoughey
Club titles
- Offaly titles: 1
College
- Years: College
- 2023-present: DCU Dóchas Éireann
College titles
- Fitzgibbon titles: 0
Inter-county
- Years: County
- 2024-: Offaly
Inter-county titles
- Leinster titles: 0
- All-Irelands: 0
- NHL: 0
- All Stars: 0

Colin Spain (born 2004) is an Irish hurler. At club level he plays with Kilcormac–Killoughey and at inter-county level with the Offaly senior hurling team.

== Career ==
Spain was part of the Coláiste Naomh Cormac senior team that beat Hamilton High School to claim the All-Ireland PPS SBHC title in 2023. Spain's performances for the school resulted in his inclusion on the combined Offaly Schools team which also won the Leinster PPS SAHC in 2023. He has also lined out for DCU Dóchas Éireann.

After progressing through the juvenile and underage ranks with the Kilcormac–Killoughey club, Spain made his senior team debut in 2022. He claimed an Offaly SHC medal the following year after beating Shinrone in the final

Spain first appeared on the inter-county scene during a two-year tenure with the Offaly minor hurling team in 2020 and 2021. Spain immediately progressed to the under-20 team was at midfield when Offaly lost the 2023 All-Ireland under-20 final to Cork. He was again included on the team in 2024 and collected a winners' medal after beating Tipperary by 2–20 to 2–14 in the All-Ireland final.

Spain made his senior team debut when he came on as a substitute for Adam Screeney in a defeat of Laois in the 2024 Joe McDonagh Cup final.

== Honours ==
Coláiste Naomh Cormac

- All-Ireland PPS Senior B Hurling Championship: 2023
- Leinster PPS Senior B Hurling Championship: 2023
- All-Ireland PPS Senior C Hurling Championship: 2022
- Leinster PPS Senior C Hurling Championship: 2022

Offaly Schools

- Leinster PPS Senior A Hurling Championship: 2023

Kilcormac–Killoughey

- Offaly Senior Hurling Championship: 2023

Offaly

- Joe McDonagh Cup: 2024
- All-Ireland Under-20 Hurling Championship: 2024
- Leinster Under-20 Hurling Championship: 2023, 2024
