= Conor Doyle (hurler) =

Irish hurler

Personal information
- Native name: Conchúr Ó Dúill (Irish)
- Born: 2005 (age 20–21) Clara, County Offaly, Ireland

Sport
- Sport: Hurling
- Position: Left wing-forward
Club
- Years: Club
- 2023-present: Clara
Club titles
- Offaly titles: 0
Inter-county
- Years: County
- 2026-: Offaly
Inter-county titles
- Leinster titles: 0
- All-Irelands: 0
- NHL: 0
- All Stars: 0

Conor Doyle (born 2005) is an Irish hurler. At club level he plays with Clara and at inter-county level with the Offaly senior hurling team.

== Career ==
Doyle played hurling and Gaelic football to a high standard as a student at Ard Scoil Chiaráin Naofa in Clara. He won a Leinster PPS SDFC title in 2023, however, the school faced defeat by St Joseph's Secondary School in the subsequent All-Ireland final. Doyle's performances for the school resulted in his inclusion on the combined Offaly Schools team which also won the Leinster PPS SAHC title in 2023.

After progressing through the juvenile and underage ranks with the Clara club, Doyle made his senior team debut as a dual player in 2023. He won an Offaly SBFC medal in 2023, following Clara's 3–14 to 3–07 win over Ballinagar in the final.

Doyle first appeared on the inter-county for Offaly as a member of the minor team. His last game in the grade was a defeat by Tipperary in the 2022 All-Ireland minor final. Doyle immediately progressed to the under-20 team, however, Offaly lost the 2023 All-Ireland U20HC final to Cork. He was again eligible for the grade the following year and collected a winners' medal after beating Tipperary by 2–20 to 2–14 in the 2024 All-Ireland U20HC final.

Doyle made his senior team debut during the 2026 National Hurling League.

== Career statistics ==
As of 1 February 2026

Team	Year	National League			Leinster		All-Ireland		Total	
Team	Year	Division	Apps	Score	Apps	Score	Apps	Score	Apps	Score
Offaly	2026	Division 1A	2	0-00	0	0-00	0	0-00	2	0-00
Career total			2	0-00	0	0-00	0	0-00	2	0-00

== Honours ==
Ard Scoil Chiaráin Naofa

- Leinster PPS Senior D Football Championship: 2023

Offaly Schools

- Leinster PPS Senior A Hurling Championship: 2023

Clara

- Offaly Senior B Football Championship: 2025

Offaly

- All-Ireland Under-20 Hurling Championship: 2024
- Leinster Under-20 Hurling Championship: 2023, 2024
- Leinster Minor Hurling Championship: 2022
