= Daniel Hand (hurler) =

Irish hurler (born 2005)

Personal information
- Native name: Dónall Ó Láimhin (Irish)
- Born: 2005 (age 20–21) Kilcormac, County Offaly, Ireland
- Occupation: Student

Sport
- Sport: Hurling
- Position: Right corner-forward
Club
- Years: Club
- 2023-present: Kilcormac–Killoughey
Club titles
- Offaly titles: 2
College
- Years: College
- Garda College
College titles
- Fitzgibbon titles: 0
Inter-county
- Years: County
- 2026-: Offaly
Inter-county titles
- Leinster titles: 0
- All-Irelands: 0
- NHL: 0
- All Stars: 0

Daniel Hand (born 2005) is an Irish hurler. At club level he plays with Kilcormac–Killoughey and at inter-county level with the Offaly senior hurling team.

== Career ==
Hand played hurling at all grades as a student at Coláiste Naomh Cormac. He was amongst the scorers when the school team beat Hamilton High School to claim the All-Ireland PPS SBHC title in 2023. Hand's performances for the school resulted in his inclusion on the combined Offaly Schools team which also won the Leinster PPS SAHC in 2023. He has also lined out for the Garda College in the Fitzgibbon Cup.

After progressing through the juvenile and underage ranks with the Kilcormac–Killoughey club, Hand made his adult debut with the club's second team in 2023. He ended the season with an Offaly SBHC medal. Hand immediately made the step up to the club's top senior team and won consecutive Offaly SHC medals in 2024 and 2025.

Hand first appeared on the inter-county scene for Offaly as a member of the minor team. His last game in the grade was a defeat by Tipperary in the 2022 All-Ireland MHC final. Hand later progressed to the under-20 team and collected an All-Ireland U20HC winners' medal after beating Tipperary by 2–20 to 2–14 in the 2024 All-Ireland U20HC final.

Hand made his senior team debut during the 2026 National Hurling League.

== Career statistics ==
As of 1 February 2026

Team	Year	National League			Leinster		All-Ireland		Total	
Team	Year	Division	Apps	Score	Apps	Score	Apps	Score	Apps	Score
Offaly	2026	Division 1A	2	0-00	0	0-00	0	0-00	2	0-00
Career total			2	0-00	0	0-00	0	0-00	2	0-00

== Honours ==
Coláiste Naomh Cormac

- All-Ireland PPS Senior B Hurling Championship: 2023
- Leinster PPS Senior B Hurling Championship: 2023
- All-Ireland PPS Senior C Hurling Championship: 2022
- Leinster PPS Senior C Hurling Championship: 2022

Offaly Schools

- Leinster PPS Senior A Hurling Championship: 2023

Kilcormac–Killoughey

- Offaly Senior Hurling Championship: 2024, 2025
- Offaly Senior B Hurling Championship: 2023

Offaly

- All-Ireland Under-20 Hurling Championship: 2024
- Leinster Under-20 Hurling Championship: 2024
- Leinster Minor Hurling Championship: 2022
