= Dan Ravenhill =

Irish hurler

Personal information
- Born: 2005 (age 20–21) Durrow, County Offaly, Ireland
- Occupation: Student

Sport
- Sport: Hurling
- Position: Right corner-forward
Club
- Years: Club
- 2023-present: Ballinamere
Club titles
- Offaly titles: 0
Inter-county
- Years: County
- 2024-: Offaly
Inter-county titles
- Leinster titles: 0
- All-Irelands: 0
- NHL: 0
- All Stars: 0

Dan Ravenhill (born 2005) is an Irish hurler. At club level he plays with Ballinamere and at inter-county level with the Offaly senior hurling team. He is a brother of Ross Ravenhill.

== Career ==
Ravenhill first played hurling to a high standard as a student at Coláiste Choilm in Tullamore. His performances for the school resulted in his inclusion on the combined Offaly Schools team which won the Leinster PPS SAHC title in 2023. After progressing through the juvenile and underage ranks with the Ballinamere club, Ravenhill made his senior team debut in 2023.

Ravenhill first appeared on the inter-county scene during a two-year tenure with the Offaly minor hurling team. His last game in the grade saw him captain the team to a defeat by Tipperary in the 2022 All-Ireland minor final. Ravenhill immediately step up to the under-20 team, however, Offaly lost the 2023 All-Ireland under-20 final to Cork. An injury hampered his under-20 appearances the following year, however, he collected a winners' medal after beating Tipperary by 2–20 to 2–14 in the All-Ireland final.

Ravenhill made his senior team debut during the 2024 National Hurling League.

== Career statistics ==
As of 1 June 2024

Team	Year	National League			Joe McDonagh Cup		Leinster		All-Ireland		Total	
Team	Year	Division	Apps	Score	Apps	Score	Apps	Score	Apps	Score	Apps	Score
Offaly Minor	2021	—			—		1	0-02	—		1	0-02
Offaly Minor	2022	—			—		5	3-26	2	0-08	7	3-34
Offaly Minor	Total	—			—		6	3-28	2	0-08	8	3-36
Offaly U20	2023	—			—		4	0-07	1	1-05	5	1-12
Offaly U20	2024	—			—		2	0-00	1	0-00	3	0-00
Offaly U20	Total	—			—		6	0-07	2	1-05	8	1-12
Offaly	2024	Division 1A	3	0-03	1	0-01	—		0	0-00	4	0-04
Offaly	Total		3	0-03	1	0-01	—		0	0-00	4	0-04
Career total			3	0-03	1	0-01	12	3-35	4	1-13	20	4-52

== Honours ==
Offaly Schools

- Leinster PPS Senior A Hurling Championship: 2023

Offaly

- All-Ireland Under-20 Hurling Championship: 2024
- Leinster Under-20 Hurling Championship: 2023, 2024
- Leinster Minor Hurling Championship: 2022 (c)

Sporting positions
Preceded by	Offaly minor hurling team captain 2022	Succeeded by
