= Shane Rigney =

Irish hurler

Personal information
- Native name: Seán Ó Roigne (Irish)
- Born: 2005 (age 20–21) Banagher, County Offaly, Ireland

Sport
- Sport: Hurling
- Position: Right wing-forward
Club
- Years: Club
- St Rynagh's
Club titles
- Offaly titles: 0
Inter-county*
Years	County	Apps (scores)
2026-	Offaly	1 (1-00)
Inter-county titles
- Leinster titles: 0
- All-Irelands: 0
- NHL: 0
- All Stars: 0
- *Inter County team apps and scores correct as of 10:22, 19 April 2026.

Shane Rigney (born 2005) is an Irish hurler. At club level he plays with Carrig & Riverstown and at inter-county level with the Offaly senior hurling team.

== Career ==
Rigney first played hurling at juvenile and underage levels with the St Rynagh's club, before progressing to adult level. He attended Banagher College and played in all grades of hurling during his time there. Rigney won a Leinster PPS SBHC title in 2024, having been red carded in the 2–27 to 4–15 extra-time win over Heywood Community School in the final. His performances for the school resulted in his inclusion on the combined Offaly Schools team which won the Leinster PPS SAHC in 2023.

Rigney first appeared on the inter-county as a member of the Offaly minor hurling team. His last game in the grade was a defeat by Tipperary in the 2022 All-Ireland minor final. Rigney immediately progressed to the under-20 team, however, Offaly lost the 2023 All-Ireland under-20 final to Cork. He was again included on the team the following year and collected a winners' medal after beating Tipperary by 2–20 to 2–14 in the All-Ireland final.

Rigney made his senior team debut in a Leinster SHC game against Dublin in April 2026.

== Honours ==
Banagher College

- Leinster PPS Senior B Hurling Championship: 2024

Offaly Schools

- Leinster PPS Senior A Hurling Championship: 2023

Offaly

- All-Ireland Under-20 Hurling Championship: 2024
- Leinster Under-20 Hurling Championship: 2023, 2024
- Leinster Minor Hurling Championship: 2022
