= Patrick Taaffe =

Irish Gaelic footballer and hurler

Personal information
- Native name: Pádraig Táth (Irish)
- Born: 2004 (age 21–22) Ferbane, County Offaly, Ireland
- Occupation: Student

Sport
- Sport: Hurling
- Position: Right corner-back
Clubs
- Years: Club
- Belmont; Ferbane
Club titles
	Football	Hurling
Offaly titles	0	0
College
- Years: College
- 2023-present: University of Galway
College titles
- Fitzgibbon titles: 0
Inter-county
- Years: County
- 2025-: Offaly
Inter-county titles
- Leinster titles: 0
- All-Irelands: 0
- NHL: 0
- All Stars: 0

Patrick Taaffe (born 2004) is an Irish hurler and Gaelic footballer. At club level he plays with Belmont and Ferbane, and at inter-county level with the Offaly senior hurling team.

== Career ==
Taaffe played hurling and Gaelic football as a student at Gallen Community School. He was part of the school team that won the Leinster PPS SDFC title in 2022. Taaffe's hurling performances for the school resulted in his inclusion on the combined Offaly Schools team which won the Leinster PPS SAHC title in 2023. He has also been included on the University of Galway Fitzgibbon Cup team.

At club level, Taaffe plays hurling with Belmont and Gaelic football with sister club Ferbane. He first appeared on the inter-county scene for Offaly as a dual player at minor level in 2020 and 2021. Taaffe later progressed to the under-20 team and was at corner-back when Offaly lost the 2023 All-Ireland under-20 final to Cork. He was again included on the team in 2024 and collected a winners' medal after beating Tipperary by 2–20 to 2–14 in the All-Ireland final.

Taaffe joined the Offaly senior hurling team in 2025.

== Honours ==
Gallen Community School

- Leinster PPS Senior D Football Championship: 2022

Offaly Schools

- Leinster PPS Senior A Hurling Championship: 2023

Offaly

- All-Ireland Under-20 Hurling Championship: 2024
- Leinster Under-20 Hurling Championship: 2023, 2024
