= Liam Hoare =

Irish hurler

Personal information
- Native name: Liam de Hóra (Irish)
- Born: 2005 (age 20–21) Carrig, County Offaly, Ireland
- Occupation: Student

Sport
- Sport: Hurling
- Position: Goalkeeper
Club
- Years: Club
- Carrig & Riverstown
Club titles
- Offaly titles: 0
College
- Years: College
- 2024-present: University of Galway
College titles
- Fitzgibbon titles: 0
Inter-county
- Years: County
- 2025-: Offaly
Inter-county titles
- Leinster titles: 0
- All-Irelands: 0
- NHL: 0
- All Stars: 0

Liam Hoare (born 2005) is an Irish hurler. At club level he plays with Carrig & Riverstown and at inter-county level with the Offaly senior hurling team.

== Career ==
Hoare played hurling as a student at St Brendan's Community School in Birr. He was part of the Offaly Schools amalgamation that won the Leinster PPS SAHC in 2023. Hoare has also played for the University of Galway team.

At club level, Hoare plays with Carrig & Riverstown. After progressing through the juvenile and underage ranks, he eventually began his adult playing career. Hoare was a member of the team that beat Coolderry by 1–20 to 2–11 to win the Offaly IHC title in 2023.

Hoare first appeared on the inter-county scene with Offaly as a member of the minor team. His last game in the grade was a defeat by Tipperary in the 2022 All-Ireland minor final. Hoare later progressed to the under-20 team. He won an All-Ireland U20HC medal after beating Tipperary by 2–20 to 2–14 in the 2024 All-Ireland final. Hoare joined the Offaly senior hurling team in 2025.

== Personal life ==
Hoare was diagnosed with a form of lymphoma in December 2022.

== Honours ==
Offaly Schools

- Leinster PPS Senior A Hurling Championship: 2023

Carrig & Riverstown

- Offaly Intermediate Hurling Championship: 2023

Offaly

- All-Ireland Under-20 Hurling Championship: 2024
- Leinster Under-20 Hurling Championship: 2024
- Leinster Minor Hurling Championship: 2022
