= Paddy McCormack (Tipperary hurler) =

Irish hurler (born 2005)

Paddy McCoramck
Personal information
- Native name: Pádraig Mac Cormaic (Irish)
- Born: 2005 (age 20–21) Borrisoleigh; County Tipperary, Ireland
- Occupation: Student

Sport
- Sport: Hurling
- Position: Full-forward
Club*
Years	Club	Apps (scores)
2023-present	Borris-Ileigh	7 (4-04)
Club titles
- Tipperary titles: 0
College
- Years: College
- 2023-present: TUS Midwest
College titles
- Fitzgibbon titles: 0
Inter-county**
Years	County	Apps (scores)
2025-	Tipperary	0 (0-00)
Inter-county titles
- Munster titles: 0
- All-Irelands: 1
- NHL: 0
- All Stars: 0
- * club appearances and scores correct as of 22:04, 19 July 2025. **Inter County team apps and scores correct as of 22:04, 19 July 2025.

Patrick McCormack (born 2005) is an Irish hurler. At club level, he plays with Borris-Ileigh and at inter-county level with the Tipperary senior hurling team.

== Career ==
McCormack played hurling as a student at Our Lady's Secondary School in Templemore. He played in the various grades during his time there, including in the Dr Harty Cup. McCormack later studied at TUS Midwest and has been included on their Fitzgibbon Cup team.

At club level, McCormack first played for Borris-Ileigh at juvenile and underage levels. He won North Tipperary U21AHC titles in 2022 and 2024. McCormack made his senior team debut in 2023.

McCormack first appeared on the inter-county scene for Tipperary at the age of 17 as a member of the minor team that won the All-Ireland MHC title after a defeat of Offaly in 2022. McCormack got the winning score with a goal in the last seconds of the game. He immediately progressed to the under-20 team, however, he missed much of the 2024 season due to injury. McCormack was again eligible for the grade the following year and won an All-Ireland U20HC medal after a 3–19 to 1–16 win over Kikenny in the final in which he scored 2–1.

Performances in the under-20 grade resulted in McCormack being drafted onto the senior team in June 2025.

On 20 July in the 2025 All-Ireland final, he was and unused substitute as Tipperary defeated Cork by 3–27 to 1–19 and claim a 29th All-Ireland title. This win completed the full set of Minor, Under-20, and Senior All-Ireland hurling titles.

== Career statistics ==
=== Club ===
As of 14 September 2024

Team	Year	Tipperary SHC	
Team	Year	Apps	Score
Borris–Ileigh	2023	3	1-02
Borris–Ileigh	2024	4	3-02
Career total		7	4-04

=== Inter-county ===
As of match played 6 July 2025.

Team	Year	National League			Munster		All-Ireland		Total	
Team	Year	Division	Apps	Score	Apps	Score	Apps	Score	Apps	Score
Tipperary (MH)	2022	—			4	1-11	2	1-05	6	2-16
Tipperary (MH)	Total	—			4	1-11	2	1-05	6	2-16
Tipperary (U20)	2023	—			1	0-00	—		1	0-00
Tipperary (U20)	2024	—			3	0-07	0	0-00	3	0-07
Tipperary (U20)	2025	—			5	3-09	1	2-01	6	5-10
Tipperary (U20)	Total	—			9	3-16	1	2-01	10	5-17
Tipperary	2025	Division 1B	—		—		0	0-00	0	0-00
Tipperary	Total		—		—		0	0-00	0	0-00
Career total			—		13	4-27	3	3-06	16	7-33

== Honours ==
Borris-Ileigh

- North Tipperary Under-21 A Hurling Championship: 2022, 2024

Tipperary

- All-Ireland Senior Hurling Championship (1): 2025
- All-Ireland Under-20 Hurling Championship: 2025
- Munster Under-20 Hurling Championship: 2024, 2025
- All-Ireland Minor Hurling Championship: 2022
- Munster Minor Hurling Championship: 2022
