= Eoin Burke =

Irish hurler

Personal information
- Native name: Eoin de Búrca (Irish)
- Born: 2004 (age 21–22) Coolderry, County Offaly, Ireland
- Occupation: Student

Sport
- Sport: Hurling
- Position: Left wing-forward
Club
- Years: Club
- 2022-present: Coolderry
Club titles
- Offaly titles: 0
College
- Years: College
- 2024-present: ATU Galway
College titles
- Fitzgibbon titles: 0
Inter-county
- Years: County
- 2025-: Offaly
Inter-county titles
- Leinster titles: 0
- All-Irelands: 0
- NHL: 0
- All Stars: 0

Eoin Burke (born 2004) is an Irish hurler. At club level he plays with Coolderry and at inter-county level with the Offaly senior hurling team.

== Career ==
Burke played hurling as a student at St Brendan's Community School in Birr. His performances for the school resulted in his inclusion on the combined Offaly Schools team which won the Leinster PPS SAHC title in 2023. Burke has also been included on the ATU Galway Fitzgibbon Cup team.

After progressing through the juvenile and underage ranks with the Coolderry club, Burke eventually joined the club's senior team. He first appeared on the inter-county scene for Offaly as a member of the Celtic Challenge team in 2021. Burke joined the under-20 team in 2023 and collected an All-Ireland U20HC winners' medal after beating Tipperary by 2–20 to 2–14 in the All-Ireland final.

Burke joined the Offaly senior hurling team in 2025.

== Honours ==
Offaly Schools

- Leinster PPS Senior A Hurling Championship: 2023

Offaly

- All-Ireland Under-20 Hurling Championship: 2024
- Leinster Under-20 Hurling Championship: 2023, 2024
