= Adam Screeney =

Irish hurler (born 2005)

Personal information
- Born: January 2005 (age 21) Kilcormac, County Offaly, Ireland
- Occupation: Student
- Height: 5 ft 8 in (173 cm)

Sport
- Sport: Hurling
- Position: Left corner-forward
Club*
Years	Club	Apps (scores)
2023-present	Kilcormac–Killoughey	26 (9-206)
Club titles
- Offaly titles: 4
College
- Years: College
- 2023-present: University of Limerick
College titles
- Fitzgibbon titles: 1
Inter-county**
Years	County	Apps (scores)
2024-present	Offaly	5 (1-13)
Inter-county titles
- Leinster titles: 0
- All-Irelands: 0
- NHL: 0
- All Stars: 0
- * club appearances and scores correct as of 22:05, 18 October 2026. **Inter County team apps and scores correct as of 13:05, 2 February 2026.

Adam Screeney (born January 2005) is an Irish hurler. At club level he plays with Kilcormac–Killoughey and at inter-county level with the Offaly senior hurling team. He is a brother of Jack Screeney.

== Career ==
Screeney first played hurling to a high standard as a student at Coláiste Naomh Cormac. He scored 2-13 when the school team beat Hamilton High School to claim the All-Ireland PPS SBHC title in 2023. Screeney's performances for the school resulted in his inclusion on the combined Offaly Schools team which also won the Leinster PPS SAHC in 2023. He has also lined out for the University of Limerick.

After progressing through the juvenile and underage ranks with the Kilcormac–Killoughey club, Screeney made his senior team debut in 2023. He ended the season with an Offaly SHC medal, while he was also the team's top scorer at county and provincial levels with 2-56.

Screeney first appeared on the inter-county scene during a two-year tenure with the Offaly minor hurling team. His last game in the grade was a defeat by Tipperary in the 2022 All-Ireland minor final. Screeney immediately progressed to the under-20 team in 2023 and was the overall top scorer with 2-59, however, Offaly lost the 2023 All-Ireland under-20 final to Cork. He was again the top scorer in 2024 and collected a winners' medal after beating Tipperary by 2–20 to 2–14 in the All-Ireland final.

Screeney made his senior team debut during the 2024 National Hurling League. He won a Joe McDonagh Cup medal in his debut season after a defeat of Laois in the final.

== Career statistics ==
=== Club ===
As of 8 November 2026

Team	Year	Offaly		Leinster		All-Ireland		Total	
Team	Year	Apps	Score	Apps	Score	Apps	Score	Apps	Score
Kilcormac–Killoughey	2023	6	1-44	2	1-12	—		8	2-56
Kilcormac–Killoughey	2024	6	3-50	3	2-20	—		9	5-70
Kilcormac–Killoughey	2025	6	1-51	1	1-05	—		7	2-56
Kilcormac–Killoughey	2026	2	0-24	1	1-13	—		3	1-37
Total		20	5-169	7	5-50	—		27	10-219

=== Inter-county ===
As of 26 April 2026

Team	Year	National League			Joe McDonagh Cup		Leinster		All-Ireland		Total	
Team	Year	Division	Apps	Score	Apps	Score	Apps	Score	Apps	Score	Apps	Score
Offaly Minor	2021	—			—		1	1-08	—		1	1-08
Offaly Minor	2022	—			—		5	4-40	2	1-11	7	5-51
Offaly Minor	Total	—			—		6	5-48	2	1-11	8	6-59
Offaly U20	2023	—			—		6	2-51	1	0-08	7	2-59
Offaly U20	2024	—			—		5	1-50	1	0-12	6	1-62
Offaly U20	2025	—			—		3	0-15	—		3	0-15
Offaly U20	Total	—			—		14	3-116	2	0-20	16	3-136
Offaly	2024	Division 1A	3	0-02	4	1-10	—		0	0-00	7	1-12
Offaly	2025	Division 1B	0	0-00	—		1	0-03	—		1	0-03
Offaly	2026	Division 1A	6	0-43	—		2	1-17	—		8	1-60
Offaly	Total		9	0-45	4	1-10	3	1-20	0	0-00	16	2-75
Career total			9	0-45	4	1-10	23	9-184	4	1-31	40	11-270

== Honours ==
Coláiste Naomh Cormac

- All-Ireland PPS Senior B Hurling Championship (1): 2023 (c)
- Leinster PPS Senior B Hurling Championship (1): 2023 (c)
- All-Ireland PPS Senior C Hurling Championship (1): 2022
- Leinster PPS Senior C Hurling Championship (1): 2022

Offaly Schools

- Leinster PPS Senior A Hurling Championship (1): 2023

University of Limerick

- Fitzgibbon Cup (1): 2026
- Higher Education Freshers 1 Hurling League (1): 2023

Kilcormac–Killoughey

- Offaly Senior Hurling Championship (4): 2023, 2024, 2025, 2006

Offaly

- Joe McDonagh Cup (1): 2024
- All-Ireland Under-20 Hurling Championship (1): 2024
- Leinster Under-20 Hurling Championship (2): 2023, 2024
- Leinster Minor Hurling Championship (1): 2022

Achievements
Preceded by Jack Leahy	GAA Minor Star Hurler of the Year; 2022	Succeeded by Eoghan Gunning
