= Paudie O'Sullivan (Fr O'Neill's hurler) =

Irish hurler

Personal information
- Native name: Pádraig Ó Súilleabháin (Irish)
- Born: 2004 (age 21–22) Ballymacoda, County Cork, Ireland
- Occupation: Student

Sport
- Sport: Hurling
- Position: Goalkeeper
Club
- Years: Club
- 2022-present: Fr O'Neill's
Club titles
- Cork titles: 0
College
- Years: College
- 2023-present: University College Cork
College titles
- Fitzgibbon titles: 0
Inter-county*
Years	County	Apps (scores)
2026-	Cork	0 (0-00)
Inter-county titles
- Munster titles: 0
- All-Irelands: 0
- NHL: 0
- All Stars: 0
- *Inter County team apps and scores correct as of 20:08, 23 January 2026.

Paudie O'Sullivan (born 2004) is an Irish hurler. At club level, he plays with Fr O'Neill's and at inter-county level with the Cork senior hurling team.

== Career ==
O'Sullivan played hurling at all grades, including the Dr Harty Cup, as a student at Midleton CBS Secondary School. He later lined out with University College Cork in the Fitzgibbon Cup, as well as winning the pre-season Canon O'Brien Cup in 2026. At club level with Fr O'Neill's, O'Sullivan made his senior team debut during the club's Cork SAHC-winning season in 2022.

At inter-county level, O'Sullivan first appeared for Cork as a member of the minor team. He was goalkeeper when the team won the All-Ireland MHC title after a 1–23 to 0–12 defeat of Galway in the 2021 All-Ireland MHC final. He was also named on the Team of the Year. O'Sullivan immediately progressed to the under-20 team and added an All-Ireland U20HC title to his collection after being sub-goalkeeper in the 2–22 to 3–13 defeat of Offaly in the 2023 All-Ireland U20 final.

O'Sullivan was added to the senior team in 2026 and was included on the matchday panel for Cork's opening National Hurling League game against Waterford.

== Career statistics ==
As of 21 June 2026

Team	Year	National League			Munster		All-Ireland		Total	
Team	Year	Division	Apps	Score	Apps	Score	Apps	Score	Apps	Score
Cork	2026	Division 1A	1	0-00	0	0-00	0	0-00	1	0-00
Career total			1	0-00	0	0-00	0	0-00	1	0-00

== Honours ==
University College Cork

- Canon O'Brien Cup: 2026

Fr O'Neill's

- Cork Senior A Hurling Championship: 2022

Cork

- All-Ireland Under-20 Hurling Championship: 2023
- Munster Under-20 Hurling Championship: 2023
- All-Ireland Minor Hurling Championship: 2021
- Munster Minor Hurling Championship: 2021
