= William Buckley (hurler) =

Irish hurler

Personal information
- Native name: Liam Ó Buachalla (Irish)
- Nickname: Bucks
- Born: 2004 (age 21–22) Cork, Ireland
- Occupation: Student
- Height: 6 ft 0 in (183 cm)

Sport
- Sport: Hurling
- Position: Left wing-forward
Clubs*
Years	Club	Apps (scores)
2022–present 2022–present	St Finbarr's (SH); St Finbarr's (SF)	20 (4–33); 18 (1–19)
Club titles
	Football	Hurling
Cork titles	1	1
College
- Years: College
- 2022–present: University College Cork
College titles
- Fitzgibbon titles: 0
Inter-county**
Years	County	Apps (scores)
2025–present	Cork	7 (0-19)
Inter-county titles
- Munster titles: 1
- All-Irelands: 0
- NHL: 1
- All Stars: 0
- * club appearances and scores correct as of 22:10, 11 February 2026. **Inter County team apps and scores correct as of 20:10, 5 July 2026.

William Buckley (born 2004) is an Irish hurler. At club level he plays with St Finbarr's and at inter-county level with the Cork senior hurling team.

== Early life ==
Born and raised in Cork, Buckley played hurling and Gaelic football during his time as a student at St Francis College in Rochestown. He progressed through the various competitions and won an All-Ireland PPS SBHC title in 2022, following a 0–17 to 0–09 win over Coláiste Bhaile Chláir in the final. Buckley later lined out with University College Cork, firstly with the freshers' team in 2023, before later lining out on the Fitzgibbon Cup team.

== Club career ==
At club level, Buckley first played for St Finbarr's as a dual player at juvenile and underage levels. He won a Rebel Óg Premier 1 MHC after a defeat of Sarsfields in 2020, before adding a Rebel Óg Premier 1 MFC title to his collection in 2021.

Buckley made his St Finabrr's senior debut in both codes in 2022. He ended the season with a Cork PSHC medal, after coming on as a substitute and scoring 0–02 in the 2–14 to 1–07 win over Blackrock in the final.

Three years later in 2025, Buckley won a Cork PSFC after lining out at wing-forward in the 1–14 to 1–13 win over Nemo Rangers in the final. He was again at wing-forward for the subsequent one-point defeat by Dingle in the 2025 Munster Club SFC final.

== Inter-county career ==
Buckley first appeared on the inter-county scene for Cork as a member of the minor team in 2020. He was still eligible for the minor grade the following year and scored three points from play from wing-forward in the 1–23 to 0–12 defeat of Galway in the 2021 All-Ireland MHC final. Buckley later progressed to the under-20 team and added an All-Ireland U20HC title to his collection after lining out at wing-forward in the 2–22 to 3–13 defeat of Offaly in the 2023 All-Ireland U20 final.

Buckley was part of Cork's senior team pre-season training panel in early 2025, but was not retained as part of the 37-man panel for their successful 2025 National Hurling League campaign. He was recalled to the panel during the 2025 Munster SHC and was an extended panel member for Cork's penalty shootout defeat of Limerick in the 2025 Munster SHC final. Buckley was also part of the extended panel for Cork's 3–27 to 1–18 defeat by Tipperary in he 2025 All-Ireland SHC final.

Buckley was again included on the panel for the 2026 National Hurling League. He made a number of appearances throughout the campaign, including the 1–27 to 1–21 defeat by Limerick in the final.

== Career statistics ==
=== Club ===
As of 23 November 2025.

Team	Year	Cork PSHC		Munster		All-Ireland		Total		Cork PSFC		Munster		All-Ireland		Total	
Team	Year	Apps	Score	Apps	Score	Apps	Score	Apps	Score	Apps	Score	Apps	Score	Apps	Score	Apps	Score
St Finbarr's	2022	6	0-08	1	0-00	—		7	0-08	0	0-00	—		—		0	0-00
St Finbarr's	2023	5	1-04	—		—		5	1-04	4	0-04	—		—		4	0-04
St Finbarr's	2024	3	2-06	—		—		3	2-06	5	0-03	—		—		5	0-03
St Finbarr's	2025	5	1-15	—		—		5	1-15	6	1-08	3	0-04	—		9	1-12
Career total		19	4-33	1	0-00	—		20	4-33	15	1-15	3	0-04	—		18	1-19

=== Inter-county ===
==== Minor and under-20 ====
Team	Year	Munster		All-Ireland		Total	
Team	Year	Apps	Score	Apps	Score	Apps	Score
Cork (MH)	2020	2	0-02	—		2	0-02
Cork (MH)	2021	2	0-08	1	0-03	3	0-11
Cork (MH)	Total	4	0-10	1	0-03	5	0-13
Cork (U20)	Year	Munster		All-Ireland		Total	
Cork (U20)	Year	Apps	Score	Apps	Score	Apps	Score
Cork (U20)	2024	5	0-10	1	0-04	6	0-14
Cork (U20)	2025	6	0-28	—		6	0-28
Cork (U20)	Total	11	0-38	1	0-04	12	0-42

==== Senior ====
As of 4 July 2026

Team	Year	National League			Munster		All-Ireland		Total	
Team	Year	Division	Apps	Score	Apps	Score	Apps	Score	Apps	Score
Cork	2025	Division 1A	0	0-00	0	0-00	0	0-00	0	0-00
Cork	2026	Division 1A	5	1-13	5	0-17	2	0-02	12	1-32
Career total			5	1-13	5	0-17	2	0-02	12	1-32

== Honours ==
St Francis College

- All-Ireland PPS Senior B Hurling Championship: 2022
- Munster PPS Senior B Hurling Championship: 2022

St Finbarr's

- Cork Premier Senior Football Championship: 2025
- Cork Premier Senior Hurling Championship: 2022
- Rebel Óg Premier 1 Minor Football Championship: 2021
- Rebel Óg Premier 1 Minor Hurling Championship: 2020

Cork

- Munster Senior Hurling Championship: 2025
- National Hurling League: 2025
- All-Ireland Under-20 Hurling Championship: 2023
- Munster Under-20 Hurling Championship: 2023
- All-Ireland Minor Hurling Championship: 2021
- Munster Minor Hurling Championship: 2021
