= Dan Bourke =

Irish hurler (born 2004)

Personal information
- Native name: Dónall de Burca (Irish)
- Born: 2004 (age 21–22) Durrow, County Offaly, Ireland
- Occupation: Student

Sport
- Sport: Hurling
- Position: Centre-forward
Club
- Years: Club
- 2022-present: Ballinamere
Club titles
- Offaly titles: 0
Inter-county*
Years	County	Apps (scores)
2024-	Offaly	1 (0-02)
Inter-county titles
- Leinster titles: 0
- All-Irelands: 0
- NHL: 0
- All Stars: 0
- *Inter County team apps and scores correct as of 22:35, 16 June 2024.

Dan Bourke (born 2004) is an Irish hurler. At club level he plays with Ballinamere and at inter-county level with the Offaly senior hurling team. He is a brother of Sam Bourke.

== Career ==
Bourke first played hurling and Gaelic football to a high standard as a student at Coláiste Choilm in Tullamore. His performances for the school resulted in his inclusion on the combined Offaly Schools team which won the Leinster PPS SAHC title in 2023. After progressing through the juvenile and underage ranks with the Ballinamere club, Bourke made his senior team debut in 2022.

Bourke first appeared on the inter-county scene during an unsuccessful two-year tenure with the Offaly minor hurling team in 2020 and 2021. He immediately progressed to the under-20 team and was at right wing-forward when they lost the 2023 All-Ireland under-20 final to Cork. Bourke was team captain a year later and collected a winners' medal after beating Tipperary by 2–20 to 2–14 in the All-Ireland final.

Bourke made his senior team debut during the 2024 National Hurling League.

== Career statistics ==
As of match played 15 June 2024

Team	Year	National League			McDonagh Cup		Leinster		All-Ireland		Total	
Team	Year	Division	Apps	Score	Apps	Score	Apps	Score	Apps	Score	Apps	Score
Offaly	2024	Division 1A	4	0-02	5	2-06	—		1	0-02	10	2-10
Career total			4	0-02	5	2-06	—		1	0-02	10	2-10

== Honours ==
Offaly Schools

- Leinster PPS Senior A Hurling Championship: 2023

Offaly

- Joe McDonagh Cup: 2024
- All-Ireland Under-20 Hurling Championship: 2024 (c)
- Leinster Under-20 Hurling Championship: 2023, 2024 (c)

Sporting positions
Preceded by Charlie Mitchell	Offaly under-20 hurling team captain 2024	Succeeded by Adam Screeney
Achievements
Preceded by Micheál Mullins	All-Ireland Under-20 Hurling Final winning captain 2024	Succeeded by Sam O'Farrell
