= Keith Smyth =

Irish hurler

Personal information
- Born: 2003 (age 22–23) Killanena, County Clare, Ireland
- Occupation: Student

Sport
- Sport: Hurling
- Position: Left wing-forward
Club
- Years: Club
- Killanena
Club titles
- Clare titles: 0
College
- Years: College
- 2022-present: University of Limerick
College titles
- Fitzgibbon titles: 0
Inter-county
- Years: County
- 2022-present: Clare
Inter-county titles
- Munster titles: 0
- All-Irelands: 0
- NHL: 0
- All Stars: 0

Keith Smyth (born 2003) is an Irish hurler. At club level he plays with Killanena, while he has also lined out at inter-county level with various Clare teams.

== Career ==
Smyth first played hurling with the Feakle-Killanena underage amalgamation. He enjoyed some success as a juvenile, winning the Clare U14HC title in 2017, before losing the Clare MAHC final in 2020. Smyth also played as a schoolboy with Gort Community School in the various Connacht competitions. He won an All-Ireland freshers league title with the University of Limerick in 2022.

Smyth first appeared on the inter-county scene with Clare during a two-year tenure with the minor team in 2019 and 2020. His second year on the team was curtailed due to a broken collar bone. Smyth later spent two seasons with the under-20 team and was the team's overall top scorer in 2023 when they were beaten by Cork in the Munster final. Smyth has been a part of the senior team since 2022.

== Honours ==
University of Limerick

- All-Ireland Freshers Hurling League Division 1: 2022

Feakle-Killanenan

- Clare Under-14 A Hurling Championship: 2017
