= Cillian Dunne =

Irish hurler

Personal information
- Native name: Cillian Ó Duinn (Irish)
- Born: 2003 (age 22–23) Ballacolla, County Laois, Ireland

Sport
- Sport: Hurling
- Position: Right corner-forward
Club
- Years: Club
- 2021–present: Clough–Ballacolla
Club titles
- Laois titles: 4
College
- Years: College
- DCU Dóchas Éireann
College titles
- Fitzgibbon titles: 0
Inter-county
- Years: County
- 2026–: Laois
Inter-county titles
- Leinster titles: 0
- All-Irelands: 0
- NHL: 0
- All Stars: 0

Cillian Dunne (born 2003) is an Irish hurler. At club level he plays with Clough–Ballacolla and at inter-county level with the Laois senior hurling team.

== Career ==
Dunne first played hurling at juvenile and underage levels with the Clough–Ballacolla club. He progressed through the various grades and made his senior team debut in 2021. Since then, Dunne has won four Laois SHC titles in five seasons.> He has also lined out with DCU Dóhas Éireann in the Fitzgibbon Cup.

At inter-county level, Dunne first appeared for Laois when he was drafted onto the minor team in late 2018. His two years in this grade ended without silverware. He later spent a further two seasons with the under-20 team. Dunne made his senior team debut during the 2026 National Hurling League. He was at corner-forward when Laois beat Carlow by 1–27 to 1–18 to win the Joe McDonagh Cup title in June 2026.

== Career statistics ==
As of 6 June 2026

Team	Year	National League			McDonagh Cup		Leinster		All-Ireland		Total	
Team	Year	Division	Apps	Score	Apps	Score	Apps	Score	Apps	Score	Apps	Score
Laois	2026	Division 2	6	3-07	6	4-13	—		—		12	7-20
Career total			6	3-07	6	4-13	0	0-00	0	0-00	12	7-20

== Honours ==
Clough–Ballacolla

- Laois Senior Hurling Championship (4): 2021, 2022, 2024, 2025

Laois

- Joe McDonagh Cup (1): 2026
- National Hurling League Division 2 (1): 2026
