= 2024 Offaly Senior Hurling Championship =

Annual hurling competition season

- Dates: 18 July – 20 October 2024
- Teams: 10
- Sponsor: Molloy Environmental Systems
- Champions: Kilcormac–Killoughey (6th title); Conor Slevin (captain); Shane Hand (manager)
- Runners-up: Ballinamere; Dan Bourke (captain); Niall Rigney (manager)
- Relegated: Tullamore

Tournament statistics
- Matches played: 26
- Goals scored: 57 (2.19 per match)
- Points scored: 902 (34.69 per match)
- Top scorer(s): Adam Screeney (3-50)

The 2024 Offaly Senior Hurling Championship was the 127th staging of the Offaly Senior Hurling Championship since its establishment by the Offaly County Board in 1896. The draw for the group stage placings was made on 20 February 2024. The championship ran from 18 July to 20 October 2024.

Kilcormac–Killoughey were the defending champions. Seir Kieran were due to be relegated, however, they earned a reprieve after Kilcormac–Killoughey decided not to field their second team, in spite of earning their right to promotion after winning the Senior B Championship.

The final was played on 20 October 2024 at Glenisk O'Connor Park in Tullamore, between Kilcormac–Killoughey and Ballinamere, in what was their first ever meeting in the final. It was Ballinamere's first appearance in the final since 1908. Kilcormac–Killoughey won the match by 0–16 to 1–11 to claim their sixth championship title overall and a second title in succession.

Kilcormac–Killoughey's Adam Screeney was the championship's top scorer with 3-50.

== Group 1 ==
=== Group 1 table ===
Semi-finalists Quarter-finalists Relegation playoff

Team	Matches				Score			Pts
Team	Pld	W	D	L	For	Against	Diff	Pts
Ballinamere	4	3	1	0	111	67	44	7
Shinrone	4	2	1	1	79	82	-3	5
Birr	4	2	1	1	76	79	-3	5
Kinnitty	4	1	1	2	54	75	-21	3
Belmont	4	0	0	4	59	76	-17	0

=== Group 1 results ===
18 July 2024 Round 1	Ballinamere	2-17 - 1-20	Birr	Glenisk O'Connor Park
	B Duignan 1-6 (4f and 1 '65'), K McDermott 0-4, M O'Brien 1-0, D Bourke and A Maher 0-2 each, R Ravenhill, J Murphy and J Maher 0-1 each.	Report	E Cahill 0-12 (6f and 1 '65'), L Quinn 0-3, A Watkins 1-0, L Nolan 0-2, B Watkins, M Watkins and E Nolan 0-1 each.

20 July 2024 Round 1	Kinnitty	1-12 - 0-12	Belmont	Drumcullen Grounds
	O Kealey (0-5, 0-4 frees), C Robinson (1-0), C Hardiman, P Robinson, S Kinsella (one free) (0-2 each), J Hardiman (0-1, free).	Report	A Egan (0-6, 0-3 frees, 0-2 '65s'), C Egan, J Clancy (0-2 each), J Nally, O Kelly (sideline cut) (0-1 each).

3 August 2024 Round 2	Shinrone	1-15 - 1-15	Kinnitty	Grant Heating St Brendan's Park
	P Cleary 0-4, D Cleary 1-0, DJ McLoughlin 0-3, S Cleary, K Sampson (1 '65') and E Bailey-O'Brien 0-2 each, E Cleary (f) and D Morkan (f) 0-1 each.	Report	O Kealey 0-5 (5f), J Hardiman 0-4 (3f), P Delaney 1-0, C Hardiman 0-3, D Flanagan, A Kealey and S Kinsella (sideline) 0-1 each.

4 August 2024 Round 2	Belmont	0-19 - 1-22	Ballinamere	St Rynagh's Park
	A Egan 0-6 (4f), C Egan 0-4, L Fox and C Flynn 0-2 each, D Egan, D Kelly, J Clancy, O Kelly (sideline), J Nally 0-1 each.	Report	D Ravenhill 0-7, B Duignan 1-4 (3f), S Bourke 0-3, A Maher, J Murphy, R Cleary 0-2 each, D Bourke and J Maher 0-1 each.

17 August 2024 Round 3	Ballinamere	4-22 - 0-16	Shinrone	Grant Heating St Brendan's Park
	B Duignan 1-10 (7f), D Bourke and K McDermott 1-2 each, J Murphy 0-3, M O'Brien 1-0, A Maher and D Ravenhill 0-2 each, J Maher 0-1.	Report	D Morkan 0-7 (6f), DJ McLoughlin 0-3, S Cleary and P Cleary 0-2 each, D Landy, E Bailey-O'Brien 0-1 each.

17 August 2024 Round 3	Birr	1-15 - 1-14	Belmont	Lusmagh Grounds
	E Cahill (0-6, 0-5 frees, 0-1 '65'), B Murphy (1-2), A Watkins, L Nolan (0-2 each), J Ryan, C Mulrooney, B Miller (0-1 each).	Report	A Egan (0-4, 0-2 frees), S Nally (1-0), O Kelly (one sideline cut), C Flynn, R McEvoy (0-2 each), D Kelly, P Taaffe, L Fox (free), D Nally (0-1 each).

1 September 2024 Round 4	Kinnitty	0-09 - 2-23	Ballinamere	St Rynagh's Park
	O Kealey 0-5 (4f), J Hardiman, C Robinson (sideline), P Robinson and E Callaghan 0-1 each.	Report	B Duignan 1-11 (6f and 1 '65'), D Bourke 1-1, K McDermott 0-3, M O'Brien 1-0, S Bourke, D Ravenhill and J Murphy 0-2 each, A Maher and D Wyer 0-1 each.

1 September 2024 Round 4	Shinrone	2-21 - 1-16	Birr	St Rynagh's Park
	D Morkan 0-10 (6f), DJ McLoughlin and E Bailey-O'Brien 1-3 each, P Cleary 0-4, S Cleary 0-1.	Report	E Cahill 0-14 (13f), L Nolan 1-0, B Miller and B Murphy 0-1 each.

8 September 2024 Round 5	Birr	0-16 - 0-12	Kinnitty	Crinkle Grounds
	E Cahill 0-9 (7f and 1 sideline), E Nolan 0-3, C Mulrooney, L Nolan, A Watkins, L Quinn 0-1 each.	Report	J Dempsey 0-5 (5f), S Kinsella 0-3, J Hardiman 0-2 (2 '65s'), D Flanagan and C Hardiman 0-1 each.

8 September 2024 Round 5	Belmont	0-11 - 1-15	Shinrone	Lusmagh Grounds
	A Egan 0-6 (frees), C Dunican 0-2, R McEvoy, O Kelly and J Clancy 0-1 each.	Report	D Morkan 0-6 (5 frees, 1 '65'), E Bailey O'Brien 1-1, P Cleary 0-2, S Cleary, DJ McLoughlin, J Sampson, A Cleary, J Liffey and A Landy 0-1 each.

== Group 2 ==
=== Group 2 table ===
Semi-finalists Quarter-finalists Relegation playoff

Team	Matches				Score			Pts
Team	Pld	W	D	L	For	Against	Diff	Pts
Kilcormac–Killoughey	4	4	0	0	133	60	73	8
Coolderry	4	2	0	2	82	82	0	4
St Rynagh's	4	2	0	2	87	95	-8	4
Seir Kieran	4	2	0	2	78	102	-24	4
Tullamore	4	0	0	4	65	106	-41	0

=== Group 2 results ===
19 July 2024 Round 1	Tullamore	0-13 - 1-36	Kilcormac–Killoughey	St Rynagh's Park
	S Dooley 0-5 (5f), J Houlihan and C Martin 0-2 each, N Furlong, G Treacy, C Bourke and T Furlong 0-1 each.	Report	A Screeney 1-9 (7f), C Mahon 0-7, C Mitchell 0-6, D Hand 0-5, C Kiely, D Kilmartin, C Spain, J Screeney 0-2 each, T Guinan 0-1.

20 July 2024 Round 1	Coolderry	0-16 - 2-19	St Rynagh's	St Brendan's Park
	E Burke 0-5 (4f), D Miller 0-3 (1 sideline), S Corcoran (2f), W Malone and K Connolly 0-2 each, E Ryan and A Cleary 0-1 each.	Report	L O'Connor 0-9 (6f), A Molloy 1-2, S Rigney 1-1, A Treacy 0-3 (2f and 1 '65'), M Maloney, J O'Connor, S Dolan, S Quirke 0-1 each.

2 August 2024 Round 2	St Rynagh's	0-15 - 4-26	Kilcormac–Killoughey	Drumcullen Grounds
	L O'Connor 0-5 (4f), S Rigney and A Treacy (2f and 1 '65') 0-3 each, S Quirke 0-2, M Maloney and J O'Connor 0-1 each.	Report	A Screeney 1-6 (goal from a penalty and 3f), C Mitchell and Cillian Kiely 1-2 each, D Hand 1-1, C Kiely 0-4, T Guinan, C Spain, J Screeney and L Kavanagh 0-2 each, C Slevin, D Kilmartin and C Mahon 0-1 each.

3 August 2024 Round 2	Coolderry	1-27 - 2-13	Seir Kieran	St Brendan's Park
	E Burke 0-8 (4f), K Connolly 1-5, E Ryan 0-4, S Ryan 0-3, S Corcoran (f), E Parlon, C Molloy, A Connolly, D Miller, A Cleary, G McCormack 0-1 each.	Report	L Carey 1-5 (5f), K Dunne 0-3, T Dooley 1-0, P Murray 0-2 (1 sideline), B Kealy, D Guinan, S Dooley 0-1 each.

16 August 2024 Round 3	Kilcormac–Killoughey	3-26 - 0-17	Seir Kieran	Kinnitty Grounds
	A Screeney 1-10 (6f and 1 '65'), C Mitchell 2-2, C Kiely and C Mahon 0-3 each, T Guinan, D Kilmartin and D Hand 0-2 each, L Kavanagh and E Grogan 0-1 each.	Report	L Carey 0-8 (7f and 1 '65'), T Dooley (1f), J Bergin, D Guinan 0-2 each, B Kealy, K Dunne, P Murray 0-1 each.

18 August 2024 Round 3	St Rynagh's	0-27 - 1-15	Tullamore	Kilcormac Grounds
	A Treacy 0-6 (4frees), D Scully and S Quirke 0-5 each, S Rigney and L O’Connor (2frees) 0-4 each, M Maloney, A Molloy and B Conneely 0-1 each.	Report	S Dooley 0-9 (6frees, 1 65), C Bourke 1-0, C Martin 0-2, C Egan, J Sheerin, M Fox and J Houlihan 0-1 each.

30 August 2024 Round 4	Seir Kieran	1-20 - 1-17	St Rynagh's	Grant Heating St Brendan's Park
	L Carey 0-9 (5f), A Hyes 1-1, K Dunne 0-3, T Dooley and A Hynes 0-2 each, B Kealy, M Gilligan, E Murphy 0-1 each.	Report	L O'Connor 1-9 (9f), S Quirke 0-3, A Molloy 0-2, A Treacy (f), B Conneely and D Scully 0-1 each.

31 August 2024 Round 4	Tullamore	1-14 - 0-21	Coolderry	Kinnitty Grounds
	S Dooley 0-9 (9f), A Leavy 1-0, M Feeney, C Martin, C Egan, J Houlihan, G Treacy 0-1 each.	Report	E Burke 0-8 (5f), S Corcoran 0-5 (3f and 2 '65s'), D Miller 0-3, K Connolly 0-2, W Malone, A Connolly and G McCormack 0-1 each.

8 September 2024 Round 5	Kilcormac–Killoughey	1-18 - 0-15	Coolderry	Rath Grounds
	A Screeney 0-7 (4frees, 1 65); T Guinan 1-2; L Kavanagh, D Hand and C Mahon 0-2 each; C Mitchell, Cillian Kiely and A Kavanagh 0-1 each.	Report	E Burke 0-5 (4frees); S Corcoran 0-3 (1free, 2 65); D Miller (2 sidelines) and K Connolly 0-2 each; D King, A Cleary, S Ryan .

8 September 2024 Round 5	Seir Kieran	1-16 - 3-08	Tullamore	St Rynagh's Park
	L Carey 1-10 (5f, 2 65’), D Guinan 0-3, A Hynes, K Dunne, J Coughlan 0-1 each	Report	S Dooley 2-3 (3f), M Fox 1-0, N Furlong 0-2, C Egan, J Sheerin, C Bourke 0-1 each.

== Knockout stage ==
=== Relegation playoff ===
22 September 2024 Playoff	Belmont	1-19 - 1-14	Tullamore	Glenisk O'Connor Park
	A Egan 0-12 (7 frees, 2 65’), C Dunican 1-1, O Kelly 0-3, C Egan 0-2, J Nally 0-1.	Report	S Dooley 0-4frees, J Houlihan 1-1, C Martin 0-2, D Fox, M Fox, N Furlong, A Leavy, C Martin and C Bourke 0-1 each

=== Quarter-finals ===
21 September 2024 Quarter-final	Birr	0-17 - 0-20	St Rynagh's	Glenisk O'Connor Park
	E Cahill 0-10 (8f and 1 '65'), A Watkins 0-2, B Harding, C Mulrooney, I Kerin, E Nolan and L Quinn 0-1 each.	Report	L O'Connor 0-11 (6f), A Treacy 0-4 (3f and 1 '65'), S Quirke 0-2, D Scully, A Molloy and C Hernon 0-1 each.

22 September 2024 Quarter-final	Coolderry	3-20 - 2-17	Shinrone	Grant Heating St Brendan's Park
	S Corcoran 0-6 (5f and 1 '65'), D Miller 0-5 (2f), K Connolly and A Connolly 1-2 each, C Burke 0-2, E Parlon, W Malone and A Cleary 0-1 each.	Report	DJ McLoughlin 1-3, D Morkan 0-5 (4f), P Cleary 1-3, J Sampson 0-3, E Cleary (f), S Cleary and K Sampson 0-1 each.

=== Semi-finals ===
6 October 2024 Semi-final	Ballinamere	1-21 - 2-14	St Rynagh's	Glenisk O'Connor Park
	J Murphy 1-4, B Duignan 0-6 (0-4f), A Maher 0-4, D Ravenhill 0-3, J Maher 0-2, D Bourke 0-2.	Report	A Treacy 1-5 (1-0 pen, 0-2f, 0-1 65), Luke O'Connor 1-3 (0-3f), D Scully 0-3, S Rigney 0-2, A Molloy 0-1,

6 October 2024 Semi-final	Kilcormac–Killoughey	4-21 - 1-11	Coolderry	Glenisk O'Connor Park
	C Mitchell 2-5, A Screeney 0-8 (0-6f), C Mahon 2-0, D Hand 0-4, T Guinan 0-3, D Kilmartin 0-1.	Report	D Miller 0-8 (5f), A Connolly 1-0, K Connolly 0-2, S Connolly 0-1.

=== Final ===
20 October 2024 Final	Ballinamere	1-11 - 0-16	Kilcormac–Killoughey	Glenisk O'Connor Park
	B Duignan 0-7 (5fs), D Ravenhill 1-0, D Bourke and A Maher 0-2 each.	Report	A Screeney 0-10 (4fs), C Spain 0-2, C Mahon, T Guinan, D Hand and C Mitchell 0-1 each.	Referee: J Deehan (Clara)

== Championship statistics ==
=== Top scorers ===
Overall

Rank	Player	Club	Tally	Total	Matches	Average
1	Adam Screeney	Kilcormac–Killoughey	3-50	59	6	9.83
2	Brian Duignan	Ballinamere	4-44	56	6	9.33
3	Eoghan Cahill	Birr	0-51	51	5	10.20
4	Luke O'Connor	St Rynagh's	2-41	47	6	7.83
5	Luke Carey	Seir Kieran	2-32	38	4	9.50
6	Shane Dooley	Tullamore	2-30	36	5	7.20
7	Adam Egan	Belmont	0-34	34	5	6.80
8	Charlie Mitchell	Kilcormac–Killoughey	5-17	32	6	5.33
9	Donal Morkan	Shinrone	0-29	29	5	5.80
10	Eoin Burke	Coolderry	0-26	26	5	5.20

In a single game

Rank	Player	Club	Tally	Total	Opposition
1	Brian Duignan	Ballinamere	1-11	14	Kinnitty
1	Eoghan Cahill	Birr	0-14	14	Shinrone
3	Adam Screeney	Kilcormac–Killoughey	1-10	13	Seir Kieran
3	Brian Duignan	Ballinamere	1-10	13	Shinrone
3	Luke Carey	Seir Kieran	1-10	13	Tullamore
6	Adam Screeney	Kilcormac–Killoughey	1-09	12	Tullamore
6	Luke O'Connor	St Rynagh's	1-09	12	Seir Kieran
6	Adam Egan	Belmont	0-12	12	Tullamore
6	Eoghan Cahill	Birr	0-12	12	Ballinamere
10	Charlie Mitchell	Kilcormac–Killoughey	2-05	11	Coolderry
10	Luke O'Connor	St Rynagh's	0-11	11	Birr

=== Miscellaneous ===
- Ballinamere qualify for the final for the first time since 1908.
