= Gearóid Dunne =

Irish hurler

Personal information
- Born: 2004 (age 21–22) Tullaroan, County Kilkenny, Ireland
- Occupation: Student

Sport
- Sport: Hurling
- Position: Centre-back
Club
- Years: Club
- 2022-present: Tullaroan
Club titles
- Kilkenny titles: 0
Inter-county*
Years	County	Apps (scores)
2023-	Kilkenny	0 (0-00)
Inter-county titles
- Leinster titles: 1
- All-Irelands: 0
- NHL: 0
- All Stars: 0
- *Inter County team apps and scores correct as of 21:32, 23 July 2023.

Gearóid Dunne (born 2004) is an Irish hurler. At club level he plays with Tullaroan and at inter-county level with the Kilkenny senior hurling team.

== Career ==
Dunne first played hurling at juvenile and underage levels with the Tullaraon club, while also playing as a schoolboy with CBS Kilkenny in the Leinster Colleges' SHC. He made his first appearances for the Tullaroan senior team in 2022.

Dunne first appeared on the inter-county scene as a member of the Kilkenny minor hurling team that lost the 2020 All-Ireland minor final to Galway. He was man of the match when Kilkenny won a second consecutive Leinster MHC title in 2021. Dunne immediately progressed to the under-20 team and was at full-forward when Kilkenny beat Limerick in the 2022 All-Ireland under-20 final.

Dunne first played for the senior team during the 2023 Walsh Cup. He was a late addition to the matchday panel when Kilkenny were beaten by Limerick in the 2023 All-Ireland final.

== Career statistics ==
As of 23 July 2023

Team	Year	National League			Leinster		All-Ireland		Total	
Team	Year	Division	Apps	Score	Apps	Score	Apps	Score	Apps	Score
Kilkenny	2023	Division 1B	5	0-03	0	0-00	0	0-00	5	0-03
Career total			5	0-03	0	0-00	0	0-00	5	0-03

== Honours ==
Kilkenny

- Leinster Senior Hurling Championship: 2023
- All-Ireland Under-20 Hurling Championship: 2022
- Leinster Under-20 Hurling Championship: 2022
- Leinster Minor Hurling Championship: 2020, 2021
