= Cross & Passion College (Ballycastle) =

Cross & Passion College, Ballycastle

Location
- Ballycastle, County Antrim; Northern Ireland
- Coordinates: 55.2031°N 6.2545°W

Information
- Type: Catholic
- Motto: Fides Patria Scientia (Faith, Country, Knowledge)
- Established: 1913
- Principal: Geraldine Duffy
- Gender: Co-educational
- Enrolment: 750
- Colour
- Website: https://www.cpcballycastle.org.uk/

Cross & Passion College, Ballycastle is a co-educational secondary school in Ballycastle, County Antrim, Northern Ireland. The school has an enrollment of over 750 pupils and retains over 50 members on staff. The facility includes roughly 48 classrooms, a cafeteria, a sports hall, a gym and an assembly hall. It also has a handball area, tennis courts, a gravel pitch and a grass pitch.

== History ==
The college first opened in 1913 in Market Street, Ballycastle and later moved to the present site on Moyle Road. The school became co-educational in 1963. During the 1970s, it was decided that Cross and Passion Convent Grammar School should merge with Star of the Sea Secondary School, forming one of the first, and currently most successful, all-ability schools in Northern Ireland.

== Academics ==
The college offers a full range of subjects from 11 to 18 years. Pupils in Years 11 to 14 enjoy the benefits of a very close collaborative arrangement with Ballycastle High School, which enables both schools to offer a greater choice and a broad, balanced curriculum.

In 2018, 71.7% of its entrants achieved five or more GCSEs at grades A* to C, including the core subjects English and Maths. Also in 2018, 75.9% of its entrants to the A-level exam achieved A*-C grades.

in 2019 the school was ranked 9th out of 159 secondary schools in Northern Ireland with 89.1% of its A-level students who sat the exams in 2017–18 being awarded three A*-C grades.

== Developments ==
Following increasing collaboration between the college and Ballycastle High School, there are now plans for a shared campus. Currently, in excess of 300 pupils from both schools share lessons on a weekly basis. The schools share much of the curriculum at Key Stage 4 & 5. Pupils from both schools have a Joint Student Council which meets regularly.
