= Ross Ravenhill =

Irish hurler

Personal information
- Born: 2000 (age 25–26) Durrow, County Offaly, Ireland
- Occupation: Student

Sport
- Sport: Hurling
- Position: Midfield
Club
- Years: Club
- Durrow (football) Ballinamere (hurling)
Club titles
- Offaly titles: 0
Inter-county
- Years: County
- 2020-present: Offaly
Inter-county titles
- Leinster titles: 0
- All-Irelands: 0
- NHL: 0
- All Stars: 0

Ross Ravenhill (born 2000) is an Irish hurler who plays for Offaly Championship club Durrow and at inter-county level with the Offaly senior hurling team. He usually lines out at midfield.

== Career ==
Ravenhill first came to hurling prominence with the combined Ballinamere/Durrow club at juvenile and underage levels, before later joining the Durrow club's top adult team. He first appeared on the inter-county scene during a two-year stint with the Offaly under-20 team. Ravenhill made his senior debut during the 2020 National Hurling League.

== Career statistics ==
As of match played 13 June 2021.

Team	Year	National League			Ring Cup		Total	
Team	Year	Division	Apps	Score	Apps	Score	Apps	Score
Offaly	2020	Division 2A	1	0-00	0	0-00	1	0-00
Offaly	2021	Division 2A	4	0-01	1	0-00	5	0-01
Total			5	0-01	1	0-00	6	0-01

== Honours ==
Offaly

- Christy Ring Cup: 2021
- National Hurling League Division 2A: 2021
