= All-Ireland PPS Senior B Hurling Championship =

Second tier hurling competition for post-primary schools in Ireland

- Irish: Craobh Iomána B Iarbhunscoileanna na hÉireann
- Code: Hurling
- Founded: 1968
- Region: Ireland (GAA)
- Trophy: Paddy Buggy Cup
- No. of teams: 4
- Title holders: Cross & Passion College (4th title)
- Most titles: Cross & Passion College (4 titles)
- Sponsors: Masita
- Official website: Official website

The All-Ireland Post-Primary Schools Paddy Buggy Cup (Senior B Hurling Championship) is an annual inter-schools hurling competition organised by the Gaelic Athletic Association. It is the second highest inter-schools hurling competition in Ireland, and has been contested every year since 1968.

The All-Ireland final, usually held in March, serves as the culmination of a knockout series of games played in February and March. Currently, qualification for the All-Ireland series is limited to the champion teams from the four provincial competitions in Connacht, Leinster, Munster and Ulster. Eligible players must be under the age of 19.

St Patrick’s College (Maghera) are the current champions, having beaten CBS Tralee by 3-19 to 2-14 in the 2026 All-Ireland final. Cross & Passion College are also the all-time record holders with four title wins.

== Current format ==
=== Qualification ===
Province	Championship	Team progressing
Connacht	Connacht PPS Senior B Hurling Championship	Champions
Leinster	Leinster PPS Senior B Hurling Championship	Champions
Munster	Munster PPS Senior B Hurling Championship	Champions
Ulster	Mageean Cup	Champions

=== Championship ===
The championship features four teams in a knockout series of games. The four provincial winners are drawn to play each other in two All-Ireland semi-finals. This is organised on a strict rotational basis between the Connacht, Leinster, Munster and Ulster teams.

== Sponsorship ==
Masita became the title sponsor of all the All-Ireland PPS competitions in 2013. The competition was previously sponsored by Coca-Cola.

== Trophy and medals ==
The Paddy Buggy Cup is the current prize for winning the All-Ireland final. It was commissioned to honour Paddy Buggy (1929–2013), who won an All-Ireland SHC medal with Kilkenny in 1947 before later serving as president of the Gaelic Athletic Association. The cup was first presented in 2014 and replaced the O'Keeffe Cup (Corn Uí Chaoimh) which was first presented in 1968 and named in honour of Pádraig Ó Caoimh.

Traditionally, the victory presentation takes place at a special rostrum in the main grandstand of the stadium. The winning captain accepts the cup on behalf of his team before giving a short speech. Individual members of the winning team then have an opportunity to come to the rostrum to lift the cup, which is held by the winning team until the following year's final. In accordance with GAA rules, a set of gold medals is awarded to the championship winners.

== List of finals ==
Year	Winners	Score	Runners-up	Score
1968	Coláiste Mhuire, Mullingar	5-08	St. Mary's CBGS	4-07
1969	Presentation College, Birr	2-12	De La Salle College, Loughrea	5-01
1970	St Joseph's Patrician College	6-11	New Ross CBS	0-03
1971	St. Mary's CBGS	4-17	Presentation College, Birr	4-05
1972	St Jarlath's College	6-05	Presentation College, Birr	4-08
1973	Presentation College, Birr	5-10	St. Mary's CBGS	5-03
1974	St. Mary's CBGS	4-09	Armagh CBS	4-07
1975	Hamilton High School	0-14	Armagh CBS	0-06
1976	Good Counsel College	3-11	St Mary's College	0-07
1977	Causeway Comprehensive School	2-09	St Joseph's CBS	2-05
1978	Charleville CBS	2-10	St Raphael's College	3-05
1979	Good Counsel College	2-04	Roscommon CBS	0-05
1980	Cashel CBS	2-16	Roscommon CBS	2-01
1981	St Joseph's Secondary School	4-11	St Vincent's CBS	3-02
1982	Cashel CBS	2-12	Callan CBS	2-02
1983	Nenagh CBS	1-11	Callan CBS	1-09
1984	Presentation Convent	3-10	St Patrick's College	0-08
1985	Presentation College, Athenry	4-07	Oatlands College	3-07
1986	Nenagh CBS	2-04	Cistercian College	1-06
1987	St Patrick's Comprehensive School	3-08	Cistercian College	2-04
1988	Castlecomer Community School	4-08	Coláiste Mhuire	3-04
1989	Presentation De La Salle, Hospital	3-12	St Louis Grammar School	3-06
1990	Scarriff Community School	1-15	Presentation College, Athenry	1-11
1991	Callan CBS	1-14	Coláiste an Spioraid Naoimh	1-10
1992	Abbey CBS	4-08	Roscommon CBS	1-07
1993	Hamilton High School	5-09	Patrician College	3-07
1994	Our Lady's Secondary School	3-08	Callan CBS	0-08
1995	Doon CBS	5-11	St Patrick's College	0-04
1996	Presentation De La Salle, Hospital	1-13	Enniscorthy CBS	0-04
1997	St Clement's College	1-08	Cistercian College	0-07
1998	Portlaoise CBS	4-13	St Cuan's College	1-07
1999	Enniscorthy CBS	4-11	St Caimin's Community School	0-17
2000	Cistercian College	3-14	St Declan's Community College	4-06
2001	Mercy College	4-13	Callan CBS	2-10
2002	Abbey CBS	3-11	Castlecomer Community School	1-13
2003	Castlecomer Community School	1-12	St Joseph's College	1-08
2004	Cistercian College	2-13	St Patrick's College	2-10
2005	Enniscorty CBS	3-08	Charleville CBS	0-13
2006	St Patrick's College	3-12	Presentation De La Salle College, Bagenalstown	1-12
2007	FCJ Bunclody	1-11	Cross & Passion College	0-08
2008	Blackwater Community School	0-14	St. Mary's CBGS	1-08
2009	Cross & Passion College	3-12	Coláiste Eoin	1-10
2010	Cross & Passion College	1-12	Dungarvan CBS	0-11
2011	St Patrick's College	0-14	St Raphael's College	0-11
2012	St. Mary's CBGS	0-18	St Joseph's Secondary School	0-05
2013	Dungarvan CBS	3-18	St. Mary's CBGS	1-05
2014	Coláiste Phobal Roscrea	2-16	Cross & Passion College	0-10
2015	Cross & Passion College	1-16	Mountrath Community School	1-12
2016	Abbey CBS	2-19	St Louis Grammar School	2-13
2017	John The Baptist Community School	2-14	St. Mary's CBGS	1-08
2018	Coláiste Choilm	0-17	St. Patrick's College	0-13
2019	St Raphael's College	1-18	Castlecomer Community School	1-14
2020	No competition due to the impact of the COVID-19 pandemic on Gaelic games.			
2021	No competition due to the impact of the COVID-19 pandemic on Gaelic games.			
2022	St Francis College	0-17	Coláiste Bhaile Chláir	0-09
2023	Coláiste Naomh Cormac	2-17	Hamilton High School	0-14
2024	St Killian's College	4-13	Blackwater Community School	0-13
2025	Cross & Passion College	1-15	Calasanctius College	1-14
2026	St Patrick's College	3-19	Tralee CBS	2-14
2027				
