= 2022 All-Ireland Minor Hurling Championship =

All-Ireland Minor Hurling Championship 2022
Championship Details
- Dates: 5 March - 2 July 2022
- Teams: 19

All Ireland Champions
- Winners: Tipperary (21st win)
- Captain: Sam O'Farrell
- Manager: James Woodlock

All Ireland Runners-up
- Runners-up: Offaly
- Captain: Dan Ravenhill
- Manager: Leo O'Connor

Provincial Champions
- Munster: Tipperary
- Leinster: Offaly
- Ulster: Not Played
- Connacht: Not Played

Championship Statistics
- Matches Played: 45
- Total Goals: 142 (3.15 per game)
- Total Points: 1386 (30.80 per game)
- Top Scorer: Ben Deegan (4-63)

The 2022 All-Ireland Minor Hurling Championship was the 92nd staging of the All-Ireland Minor Hurling Championship since its establishment by the Gaelic Athletic Association in 1928. The championship began on 5 March 2022 and ended on 3 July 2022.

Cork entered the championship as the defending champions, however, they were beaten by Clare in the Munster semi-final.

The All-Ireland final was played at Nowlan Park in Kilkenny on 3 July 2022 between Tipperary and Offaly, in what was their first meeting in a final in 35 years. Tipperary won the match by 1-17 to 1-16 to claim a record-equalling 21st championship title overall and their first title since 2016.

Ben Deegan from Laois was the championship's top scorer with 4-63.

== Leinster Minor Hurling Championship ==
=== Tier 1 ===
==== Tier 1 table ====
Key to colours
Advance to Leinster semi-finals
Advance to Leinster quarter-finals
Advance to Leinster preliminary quarter-finals

Pos	Team	Pld	W	D	L	SF	SA	Diff	Pts
1	Kilkenny	2	1	0	1	45	41	4	2
2	Dublin	2	1	0	1	52	52	0	2
3	Wexford	2	1	0	1	48	52	-4	2

==== Tier 1 results ====
26 March 2022 Round 1	Dublin	2-23 - 3-21	Wexford	Parnell Park
	S Crosbie 1-2, O Gaffney (4f) 0-5, R O’Connor (3f), D Purcell, C Moran (2 ’65, 1f), C Donovan 0-3 each, C Brennan 1-0, D Lyons (2f), C Newton 0-2 each.	Report	C Byrne 2-5 (0-1f), M Murphy (3f, 1 ’65), S Roche 0-6 each, P Doyle 1-2, S Rowley 0-2.	Referee: K Brady (Louth)

9 April 2022 Round 2	Wexford	2-12 - 2-17	Kilkenny	Chadwicks Wexford Park
	M Murphy 0-8, C Byrne 1-0, J Murray 1-0, P Doyle 0-1, D McCarthy 0-1, S Roche 0-1, D Rowley 0-1.		A Ireland-Wall 1-2, A McEvoy 0-5, R Glynn 1-1, E Lyng 0-4, E McDermott 0-2, M Stynes 0-1, T McPhillips 0-1, J Neary 0-1.

16 April 2022 Round 3	Kilkenny	2-16 - 3-14	Dublin	UPMC Nowlan Park
	A McEvoy 0-7, A Ireland-Wall 1-0, E Lyng 1-0, J Neary 0-2, R Glynn 0-2, M Murphy 0-2, G Kelly 0-1, T McPhillips 0-1, E McDermott 0-1.		O Gaffney 1-4, C Moran 0-5, C Newton 1-0, D Purcell 1-0, T Moore 0-2, S Lewis 0-1, C Brennan 0-1, S Crosbie 0-1.

=== Tier 2 ===
==== Tier 2 table ====
Pos	Team	Pld	W	D	L	SF	SA	Diff	Pts
1	Offaly	2	2	0	0	55	28	27	4
2	Laois	2	1	0	1	55	33	22	2
3	Kildare	2	0	0	2	18	57	-49	0

==== Tier 2 results ====
26 March 2022 Round 1	Kildare	0-08 - 3-23	Offaly	St Conleth's Park
	C Carroll 0-3, T Frisby 0-2, R Sinkey 0-1, O Loughran 0-1, T Ryan 0-1.	Report	D Ravenhill 1-5, D Hand 1-3, A Screeney 0-6, S Rigney 1-1, D Shirley 0-3, L Kavanagh 0-2, N Furlong 0-1, C Doyle 0-1, C Robinson 0-1.	Referee: O Behan (Kilkenny)

9 April 2022 Round 2	Laois	4-23 - 0-10	Kildare	MW Hire O'Moore Park
	B Deegan 1-7, C Byrne 1-3, J Quinlan 1-3, L Kirby 1-1, J Deegan 0-2, C Hogan 0-1, J Breen 0-1, E Cuddy 0-1, C O'Brien 0-1, A McDonagh 0-1, A Carroll 0-1, K Byrne 0-1.		T Frisby 0-6, T Ryan 0-1, C O'Reilly 0-1, O Loughran 0-1, E Harrington 0-1.

16 April 2022 Round 3	Offaly	1-20 - 1-17	Laois	Bord na Móna O'Connor Park
	A Screeney 0-9, D Ravenhill 0-5, N Furlong 1-0, S Rigney 0-2, C Doyle 0-1, C Martin 0-1, L Kavanagh 0-1, R Kelly 0-1.		B Deegan 0-7, J Quinlan 0-4, C Byrne 1-0, J Breen 0-3, T Brennan 0-2, E Cuddy 0-1.

=== Tier 3 ===
==== Tier 3 table ====
Pos	Team	Pld	W	D	L	SF	SA	Diff	Pts
1	Antrim	5	4	1	0	109	64	45	9
2	Westmeath	5	3	1	1	127	73	54	7
3	Carlow	5	3	0	2	109	71	39	6
4	Meath	5	2	1	2	103	87	16	5
5	Down	5	1	1	3	75	109	-34	3
6	Derry	5	0	0	5	41	160	-119	0

=== Preliminary quarter-finals ===
23 April 2022 Prelim. quarter-final	Westmeath	0-17 - 2-15	Laois	TEG Cusack Park
	P Murphy 0-10( 0-8 frees), J Duncan 0-2, D Smith, C Sheridan, C Neville, S Jackson and J Mulvaney 0-1 each	Report	B Deegan 2-5 (1-0 penalty, four frees), J Quinlan 0-4, J Breen and L Kirby 0-2 each, E Cuddy and A Carroll 0-1 each.	Referee: O Beehan (Kilkenny)

23 April 2022 Prelim. quarter-final	Kildare	0-06 - 1-14	Antrim	St Brigid's Park

=== Quarter-finals ===
30 April 2022 Quarter-final	Laois	2-13 - 3-08	Wexford	MW Hire O'Moore Park
	B Deegan 0-9 frees, J Quinlan 1-1, E Cuddy 1-0, J Breen 0-2, L Kirby 0-1.	Report	C Byrne 3-5 (1-0 pen, 0-2 frees), M Murphy 0-1 free, S Roche 0-1.

30 April 2022 Quarter-final	Antrim	0-11 - 3-22	Offaly	St. Brigid's Park
	J McCloskey 0-7 (6f), M McGibbon, D Kelly (“65”), J McLoughlin, C McKeown 0-1 each.	Report	A Screeney 2-7 (3f), D Ravenhill 1-8 (1-0 pen and 4f), S Rigney 0-2, N Furlong, D Hand, L Kavanagh, T Guinan 0-1

=== Semi-finals ===
7 May 2022 Semi-final	Offaly	3-18 - 1-15	Dublin	Bord na Móna O'Connor Park
	A Screeney 2-8 (5f), D Ravenhill 1-5 (Goal from a penalty, 2f and 1 '65'), S Rigney and C Robinson 0-2 each, L Kavanagh 0-1.	Report	O Gaffney 0-5 (1f), R O'Connor 1-0, C Brennan 0-3, D Purcell and J Kavanagh 0-2 each, C Moran (f), M Tierney, C Newton 0-1 each.	Referee: P Dunne (Laois)

7 May 2022 Semi-final	Laois	1-15 - 0-15	Kilkenny	O'Moore Park
	B Deegan 0-10 9f, J Quinlan 1-3, C Byrne 0-2.	Report	A Ireland-Wall 0-3, G Kelly 0-2, A McEvoy and E Lyng both 0-2 frees, E McDermott, T McPhillips, I Bolger, R Glynn, M Stynes and M Brennan 0-1 each

=== Final ===
16 May 2022 Final	Laois	0-13 - 0-21	Offaly	MW Hire O'Moore Park
	B Deegan 0-10 (seven frees, one sideline), J Quinlan 0-1, J Breen 0-1, C Byrne 0-1	Report	A Screeney 0-10 (nine frees), D Ravenhill 0-3, S Rigney 0-2, T Guinan 0-1, C Martin 0-1, L Kavanagh 0-1, D Shirley 0-1, C Doyle 0-1, C Robinson 0-1.	Referee: C Flynn (Westmeath)

== Munster Minor Hurling Championship ==
=== Group 1 ===
Pos	Team	Pld	W	D	L	SF	SA	Diff	Pts	Qualification
1	Tipperary	2	2	0	0	44	36	8	4	Advance to Semi-Finals
2	Clare	2	1	0	1	38	30	8	2	Advance to Quarter-Finals
3	Waterford	2	0	0	2	34	50	-16	0	Advance to Quarter-Finals

==== Group 1 results ====
5 April 2022 Round 1	Waterford	0-23 - 1-22	Tipperary	Fraher Field
	J Twomey 0-12 (9fs), C Tobin 0-3, B O'Connell, M Morrissey 0-2 each, D Walsh, J Henley, G Power, P Cummins 0-1 each.	Report	D Corbett 1-8 (5fs, 1 65, 1 s-l), C Foley 0-6 (3fs), P McCormack, T Delaney 0-3 each, J Egan, S Rowan 0-1 each.	Referee: C O'Regan (Cork)

12 April 2022 Round 2	Tipperary	2-13 - 0-13	Clare	FBD Semple Stadium
	D Corbett 0-9 (6f), P McCormack 1-1, T Delaney 1-1, C Foley 0-1 (f), J Egan 0-1 each		C Neylon 0-4 (2f), O Whelan 0-3 (3f), M Collins 0-2, F Lyons 0-1, J O’Neill 0-1, P Ó Sé 0-1, J Organ 0-1	Referee: N Barry (Waterford)

19 April 2022 Round 3	Clare	1-22 - 1-08	Waterford	O'Garney Park
	C Neylon (1-5), O Whelan (0-7) 5 f’s, F Hegarty (0-3), J O’Neill (0-3) J Organ (0-2), D Stritch (0-2).	Report	C Tobin (1-1), J Twomey (0-4) all f’s, B O’Connell, S Mackey & P Cummins (0-1) each.	Referee: E Stapleton (Limerick)

=== Group 2 ===
Pos	Team	Pld	W	D	L	SF	SA	Diff	Pts	Qualification
1	Cork	2	2	0	0	67	31	36	4	Advance to Semi-Finals
2	Limerick	2	1	0	1	59	37	22	2	Advance to Quarter-Finals
3	Kerry	2	0	0	2	15	73	-58	0	Advance to Quarter-Finals

==== Group 2 results ====
5 April 2022 Round 1	Kerry	0-11 - 3-25	Cork	Austin Stack Park
	K Boyle 0-5f, J Enright 0-2, L Rochford, S McElligott (0-1f), L Óg O’Connor, B O’Connor 0-1 each.	Report	R O’Sullivan 0-10 (0-7f, 0-1 65), A O’Sullivan 1-4, D Murnane 0-4, T Wilk 1-1, B Walsh 1-0, N Murray, J Casey 0-2 each, T O’Leary Hayes, E O’Mahony 0-1 each.	Referee: A Tierney (Tipperary)

12 April 2022 Round 2	Cork	4-21 - 2-14	Limerick	Páirc Uí Chaoimh
	R O’Sullivan (3-9, 0-2 frees, 0-2 65s), J Murray (0-4), S O’Donoghue (1-0), A O’Sullivan (0-3), T Wilk (0-2), J Casey, B Walsh and D Murnane (0-1 each).	Report	D Collopy (1-5, 0-4 frees), P Connery (0-4), M Field (1-0), B Moran (0-3, 0-2 frees, 0-1 65), D Langan and C McMahon (0-1 each).	Referee: J Donnelan (Clare)

19 April 2022 Round 3	Limerick	5-24 - 0-04	Kerry	TUS Gaelic Grounds
	D Collopy 2-8 (7f), P Connery 0-5, M Field and F Fitzgerald 1-1 each, T Hourigan 1-0, B Moran (1f) 0-3, C McMahon 0-2, O Meaney, J Sheehan, D Langan and B Adams 0-1 each.	Report	K Boyle 0-2 (2f), C O’Sullivan and J Enright 0-1 each.	Referee: J Dooley (Tipperary)

=== Quarter-finals ===
26 April 2022 Quarter-final	Clare	2-31 - 0-07	Kerry	O'Garney Park
	O Whelan 1-12 (10f), J O’Neill 0-6, J Organ 0-7 (3f, 1’65), C Neylon 1-0, F Hegarty 0-2, F Hayes 0-2, S McMahon 0-1, M Collins 0-1.	Report	S McElligott 0-5 (5f), J Enright 0-2.	Referee: A Tierney (Tipperary)

26 April 2022 Quarter-final	Limerick	0-10 - 2-12	Waterford	FitzGerald Park, Kilmallock
	D Collopy 0-3 (2f, 1 ’65), C Frawley 0-2, C McMahon, B Moran (1f), F Fitzgerald, J Daly and P Connery (1f) 0-1 each;	Report	J Twomey 1-6 (4f, 1 sideline), P Cummins 1-1, B O’Connell (1 sideline) 0-2, D Walsh, M Morrissey and G Power 0-1 each

=== Semi-finals ===
3 May 2022 Semi-final	Cork	1-17 - 2-17	Clare	Páirc Uí Rinn
	R O’Sullivan 1-4 (0-2 65, 0-1f), A O’Sullivan 0-4, P O’Shea, T Wilk, S O’Donoghue 0-2 each, J Murray, B Walsh, D Murnane 0-1 each.	Report	O Whelan 1-8 (0-5f, 0-2 65), C Neylon 1-1, J Organ 0-4, M Collins, J O’Neill 0-2 each.	Referee: N Barry (Waterford)

3 May 2022 Semi-final	Tipperary	3-27 - 0-15	Waterford	FBD Semple Stadium
	T Delaney 1-12, D McCarthy 1-1(1f), P McCormack, D Corbett (3fs, 1 65), 0-4 each, J Hayes 1-0, A Daly, C Martin, J Egan 0-2 each.	Report	J Twomey 0-10 (8fs, 1 65), P Cummins, M Morrissey, G Power, B O'Sullivan, C Tobin 0-1 each.	Referee: J Donnellan (Clare)

=== Final ===
11 May 2022 Final	Tipperary	1-22 - 0-25 (aet); 3-0 penalties	Clare	TUS Gaelic Grounds
	D Corbett (0-05 4f), P McCormack (0-03 1f), D McCarthy (0-03 1f), S Rowan (1-00), C Foley (0-02 1f), S O’Farrell (0-02), J Egan (0-02), J O’Callaghan (0-02), C Martin (0-01), C English (0-01), J Ormonde (0-01).	Report	O Whelan (0-09 8f 1’65), J O’Neill (0-05), J Organ (0-04), M Collins (0-02), J Hegarty (0-01), P Ó Sé (0-01), S Scanlon (0-01), C Neylon (0-01), D Keane Hayes (0-01).	Referee: N Barry (Waterford)

== All-Ireland Minor Hurling Championship ==
=== All-Ireland quarter-finals ===
Pos	Team	Pld	W	D	L	SF	SA	Diff	Pts	Qualification
1	Galway	2	2	0	0	48	29	19	4	Advance to Semi-Finals
2	Clare	2	1	0	1	30	40	-10	2	Advance to Semi-Finals
3	Laois	2	0	0	2	35	44	-9	0	

==== All-Ireland quarter-final fixtures ====
21 May 2022 Round 1	Galway	0-25 - 0-09	Clare	St. Mary's GAA Grounds
	A Niland 0-16 (0-10f, 0-1 sideline), R Burke 0-4, O O’Gorman 0-1, C Dolphin 0-1, P MacCárthaigh 0-1, C Lawless 0-1, C Gilligan 0-1.	Report	O Whelan 0-4 (0-3f), D Stritch 0-1, J O’Neill 0-1, M Collins 0-1, S Scanlon 0-1, J Organ 0-1.	Referee: R Fitzsimons (Offaly)

28 May 2022 Round 2	Laois	2-14 - 0-23	Galway	MW Hire O'Moore Park
	J Quinlan 1-5, B Deegan 0-7 (five frees, two 65s), M Downey 1-0, J Breen 0-1, T Brennan 0-1.	Report	A Niland 0-12 (six frees, one 65), C Killeen 0-3, C Dolphin 0-1, P McCarthy 0-2, C Lawless 0-2, R Burke 0-3.	Referee: T Gleeson (Dublin)

4 June 2022 Round 3	Clare	0-21 - 1-12	Laois	Cusack Park
	O Whelan 0-8 (six frees), J O’Neill 0-3, D Stritch 0-2, J Organ 0-2, S Scanlon 0-2, C Neylon 0-1, M Collins 0-2, J Hegarty 0-1.	Report	B Deegan 1-8 (all frees), J Quinlan 0-1, J Breen 0-1, E Murphy 0-1, E Cuddy 0-1.	Referee: B Keon (Galway)

=== All-Ireland semi-finals ===
17 June 2022 Semi-final	Offaly	2-16 - 0-18	Clare	FBD Semple Stadium
	A Screeney 1-5 (0-5f), D Ravenhill 0-6 (0-3f), C Doyle 1-0, D Shirley 0-1, D Hand 0-1, C Martin 0-1, L Kavanagh 0-1, S Rigney 0-1.	Report	O Whelan 0-8 (0-6f, 0-1 65), C Neylon 0-3, J Organ 0-2, J O’Neill 0-2, M O’Halloran 0-1, D Stritch 0-1, S Scanlon 0-1.	Referee: K Jordan (Tipperary)

19 June 2022 Semi-final	Tipperary	3-24 - 3-20	Galway	LIT Gaelic Grounds
	T Delaney 0-6; Joe Egan, A Daly 1-3 each; P McCormack 0-4; D Corbett 0-3 (1 free, 1 65); S Butler 1-0; C Martin 0-2; T Sheehan, C English, C Foley (free) 0-1 each.	Report	A Niland 2-11 (0-7 frees); R Burke 0-5; C Dolphin 1-2; C Trayers, O Burke 0-1 each.	Referee: P Murphy (Carlow)

=== All-Ireland final ===
2 July 2022 Final	Offaly	1-16 - 1-17	Tipperary	UPMC Nowlan Park
	A Screeney 0-6 (3f), D Hand 0-3, L Kavanagh 1-0, S Rigney and D Ravenhill (2f) 0-2 each, D Shirley, C Robinson and C Doyle 0-1 each.	Report	D Corbett 0-6 (4f and 1 '65'), P McCormack 1-1, C Foley (1f) and A Daly 0-2 each, A O'Halloran, S O'Farrell, J O'Callaghan, J Egan, D McCarthy (f) and T Delaney 0-1 each.	Attendance: 20,214; Referee: S Hynes (Galway)

== Statistics ==
=== Top scorers ===
Top scorers overall

Rank	Player	Club	Tally	Total	Matches	Average
1	Ben Deegan	Laois	4-63	75	8	9.37
2	Adam Screeney	Offaly	5-51	66	7	9.42
3	Oisín Whelan	Clare	2-59	65	8	8.12
4	Aaron Niland	Galway	2-39	45	3	15.00
5	Dan Ravenhill	Offaly	3-34	43	7	6.14
6	Damien Corbett	Tipperary	1-35	38	6	6.33
7	Ross O'Sullivan	Cork	4-23	35	3	11.66
7	Jack Twomey	Waterford	1-32	35	4	8.75
9	Jer Quinlan	Laois	4-22	34	8	4.25
10	Tom Delaney	Tipperary	2-23	29	6	4.83

In a single game

Rank	Player	Club	Tally	Total	Opposition
1	Ross O'Sullivan	Cork	3-09	18	Limerick
2	Aaron Niland	Galway	2-11	17	Tipperary
3	Aaron Niland	Galway	0-16	16	Clare
4	Oisín Whelan	Clare	1-12	15	Kerry
4	Tom Delaney	Tipperary	1-12	15	Waterford
6	Cillian Byrne	Wexford	3-05	14	Laois
6	Darren Collopy	Limerick	2-08	14	Kerry
6	Adam Screeney	Offaly	2-08	14	Dublin
9	Adam Screeney	Offaly	2-07	13	Antrim
10	Jack Twomey	Waterford	0-12	12	Tipperary
10	Aaron Niland	Galway	0-12	12	Laois

=== Miscellaneous ===
- Laois beat Kilkenny in the Leinster Championship for the first time since 1964.
- The Munster final was decided by penalty shootout for the first time ever.
- Offaly won their first Leinster Championship title since 2000.
- Galway's quarter-final group stage game against Clare in Athenry was their first home game since 1966.
- Offaly qualified for the All-Ireland final for the first time since 1989.

== Awards ==
The GAA Minor Star Hurling Team of the Year was announced on 9 August. Offaly’s Adam Screeney was named as the Player of the Year.

1. Donagh Fahy (Galway)
2. Ciarán Flynn (Laois)
3. James Mahon (Offaly)
4. Eoghan Gunning (Clare)
5. Sam O’Farrell (Tipperary)
6. James Hegarty (Clare)
7. Donal Shirley (Offaly)
8. Rory Burke (Galway)
9. Adam Daly (Tipperary)
10. Ben Deegan (Laois)
11. Dan Ravenhill (Offaly)
12. Paddy McCormack (Tipperary)
13. Aaron Niland (Galway)
14. Tom Delaney (Tipperary)
15. Adam Screeney (Offaly)
