= 2024 All-Ireland Under-20 Hurling Championship =

Gaelic games championship

Championship Details
- Dates: 30 March - 1 June 2024
- Teams: 17

All Ireland Champions
- Winners: Offaly (1st win)
- Captain: Dan Bourke
- Manager: Leo O'Connor

All Ireland Runners-up
- Runners-up: Tipperary
- Captain: Ben Currivan
- Manager: Brendan Cummins

Provincial Champions
- Munster: Tipperary
- Leinster: Offaly
- Ulster: Derry
- Connacht: Not Played

Championship Statistics
- Matches Played: 34
- Total Goals: 98
- Total Points: 1143
- Top Scorer: Adam Screeney (1-62)

The 2024 All-Ireland Under-20 Hurling Championship is the sixth staging of the All-Ireland Under-20 Championship and the 61st staging overall of a hurling championship for players between the minor and senior grades. The provincial group stage placings were confirmed in December 2023. The championship ran from 30 March to 01 June 2024.

Cork entered the championship as the defending champions, however, they were beaten by Tipperary in the Munster final.

The All-Ireland final was played on 1 June 2024. UPMC Nowlan Park in Kilkenny was chosen as the venue to commemorate the 100th anniversary of the death of GAA President James Nowlan. It was Offaly and Tipperary's second time meeting in the All-Ireland final and was their first meeting in 35 years. Offaly won the match by 2-20 to 2-14 to claim their first ever championship title.

Offaly's Adam Screeney was the championship's top scorer with 1-62.

== Leinster Under-20 Hurling Championship ==
=== Leinster tier 1 group stage ===
==== Leinster tier 1 group 1 table ====
Advance to Leinster semi-final Advance to Leinster quarter-final Advance to Leinster round 2

Team	Matches				Score			Pts
Team	Pld	W	D	L	For	Against	Diff	Pts
Galway	2	1	1	0	41	25	16	3
Offaly	2	1	1	0	36	35	1	3
Dublin	2	0	0	2	30	47	-17	0

==== Leinster tier 1 group 1 results ====
30 March 2024 Round 1	Dublin	2-14 - 1-18	Offaly	Parnell Park
	D Ó Dúlaing 0-6 (6f), D Purcell 1-2, O Gaffney 1-1, J Conroy 0-2, E Keys, B Kenny, C Rock 0-1 apiece.	Report	A Screeney 1-8 (0-7f), D Bourke 0-4, S Rigney, B Egan 0-2 each, D Shirley, C King 0-1 apiece.	Referee: M Redmond (Kildare)

6 April 2024 Round 2	Offaly	0-15 - 1-12	Galway	Glenisk O'Connor Park
	A Screeney 0-8 (7f), B Egan 0-4, T Guinan, S Rigney and D Bourke 0-1 each.	Report	A Niland 0-7 (4f and 1 '65'), D Shaughnessy 1-1, O Lohan 0-2, R Burke and T Leen 0-1 each.

13 April 2024 Round 3	Dublin	0-10 - 4-14	Galway	Glenisk O'Connor Park
	D Ó Dúlaing 0-6 (6f), D Purcell, J Conroy, N Hogan, D Bannan 0-1 apiece.	Report	A Niland 2-8 (2-6f), M Power, C Dolphin 1-0 each, D Davoren, M Burke, M Tarpey 0-2 apiece.

==== Leinster tier 1 group 2 table ====
Advance to Leinster semi-final Advance to Leinster quarter-final Advance to Leinster round 2

Team	Matches				Score			Pts
Team	Pld	W	D	L	For	Against	Diff	Pts
Kilkenny	2	2	0	0	65	36	29	4
Wexford	2	0	1	1	38	51	-13	1
Laois	2	0	1	1	34	50	-16	1

==== Leinster tier 1 group 2 results ====
30 March 2024 Round 1	Kilkenny	4-21 - 2-14	Wexford	UPMC Nowlan Park
	M Murphy 2-3, H Shine 0-8, C Hackett 1-0, N Shortall 1-0, J Walsh 0-3, G Dunne 0-2, K Doyle 0-2, A McEvoy 0-2, E Lyng 0-1.	Report	D Murphy 0-6, S Rowley 1-2, S Roche 1-1, C Byrne 0-3, L Murphy 0-1, D Farrell 0-1.

6 April 2024 Round 2	Laois	1-13 - 6-14	Kilkenny	Laois Hire O'Moore Park
	B Deegan 0-8 (frees), C Byrne 1-0, C Byrne, E Cuddy, C Fitzpatrick, C Comerford, J Quinlan 0-1 each.	Report	G Dunne 4-2 (2-0 penalties), M Murphy 1-1, N Holland 1-0, H Shine 0-3 (frees), N Shortall, E Lyng 0-2 each, M Brennan, A McEvoy (free), R Corcoran, C Hackett 0-1 each.

13 April 2024 Round 3	Wexford	0-18 - 0-18	Laois	Chadwicks Wexford Park
	S Roche 0-9 (7 frees), E Wickham 0-4, C O’Toole, C Parker, A Moran, S Rowley (free) and C Byrne 0-1 each.	Report	B Deegan 0-14 (13 frees, 1 ’65), B O’Reilly 0-2 (frees), C Comerford and T Brennan 0-1 each.

=== Leinster tier 2 group stage ===
==== Leinster tier 2 group 1 table ====
Advance to Leinster round 1

Team	Matches				Score			Pts
Team	Pld	W	D	L	For	Against	Diff	Pts
Westmeath	2	1	1	0	53	33	20	3
Meath	2	1	1	0	39	33	6	3
Derry	2	0	0	2	26	52	-26	0

==== Leinster tier 2 group 1 results ====
30 March 2024 Round 1	Meath	0-20 - 2-14	Westmeath	Páirc Tailteann
	M Leavy 0-5 frees; T Shine 0-5 four frees; P Jordan 0-2 frees; L Byrne 0-2; C O'Sullivan 0-2; M Horan 0-1; L Byrne 0-2; D Heffernan 0-1; P Barnwell 0-1.	Report	D Williams 1-6 five frees, penalty; D O'Reilly 1-2; D McCormack 0-4 two sideline cuts; C Heffernan 0-1; P Clarke 0-1.	Referee: M Ryan (Dublin)

6 April 2024 Round 2	Meath	1-16 - 1-10	Derry	Páirc Tailteann
	M Leavy 0-7, P Jordan 1-1, D Shine 0-3, L Byrne 0-2, M Horan 0-1, D Heffernan 0-1, N Conroy 0-1.	Report	R O Mianáin 1-7, A Duffin, S Quinn and B Kealy 0-1 each

13 April 2024 Round 3	Westmeath	5-18 - 0-13	Derry	TEG Cusack Park
	D Williams 1-8 (0-7f), D O’Reilly 2-3, D McCormack 1-1, I Smyth 1-0, C Heffernan 0-3, P Clarke, P Murphy, B McCabe 0-1 each.	Report	J Friel (6f), R Ó Mianáin (1f) 0-6 each, A Duffin 0-1.

==== Leinster tier 2 group 2 table ====
Advance to Leinster round 1

Team	Matches				Score			Pts
Team	Pld	W	D	L	For	Against	Diff	Pts
Kildare	2	2	0	0	49	22	27	4
Carlow	2	1	0	1	35	38	-3	2
Kerry	2	0	0	2	22	46	-24	0

==== Leinster tier 2 group 2 results ====
30 March 2024 Round 1	Carlow	1-16 - 2-10	Kerry	Netwatch Cullen Park
	K Kavanagh (0-4, 1f), C Quirke (0-4, 3f), J Nolan (1-0), D Murphy (0-3, 1f), P Doyle (0-1), É O’Shea (0-1), S Wall (0-1), T Brennan (0-1), S Kelly (0-1).	Report	E Stack (1-3, 1f), K Boyle (0-5f), R Mahony (1-0), S McElligott (0-1), F Egan (0-1).	Referee: G McGrath (Wexford)

6 April 2024 Round 2	Kildare	4-15 - 0-06	Kerry	Hawkfield Centre of Excellence
	J Dolan 3-2, F Maher 1-4 (0-3fs), O Lynam 0-2; C Kirwan 0-2; K Harrington 0-1, C Boran 0-1, C Carroll 0-1, C O’Reilly 0-1, A Bell 0-1.	Report	K Boyle 0-2 (fs), S McElligott 0-1; E Walsh 0-1, E Stack 0-1, C O'Sullivan 0-1.

12 April 2024 Round 3	Kildare	2-16 - 2-10	Carlow	Hawkfield Centre of Excellence
	K Harrington 1-4, F Maher 1-2 (2 frees), C Boran 0-3, C Carroll 0-2 (1 free), E Keane 0-1, O Lynam 0-1, J Dolan 0-1, C O'Reilly 0-1, T Ryan 0-1.	Report	E Doyle 2-0, C Quirke 0-6 (3 frees,1'65), T Brennan 0-2, K Kavanagh 0-1, E O'Shea 0-1.

=== Leinster knockout stage ===
==== Leinster round 1 ====
19 April 2024 Round 1	Kildare	3-17 - 0-11	Meath	Hawkfield Centre of Excellence
	F Maher 3-8, six frees; O Lynam 0-4; K Harringtno 0-1; C Kirwan 0-1; T Ryan 0-1; T Frisby 0-1; A Bell 0-1.	Report	M Leavy 0-8, seven frees; M Horan 0-1; N Conroy 0-1; D Horan 0-1.

20 April 2024 Round 1	Westmeath	3-26 - 2-15	Carlow	TEG Cusack Park
	D O’Reilly 2-5, D Williams 0-10 (4f, 1‘65’), D McCormack 1-6 (2f, 1‘65’, 1s/l), P Murphy 0-2, P Clarke, D Smith (f), C McKeogh 0-1 each.	Report	S Kelly 0-8 (2f), C Quirke 1-3 (2f), J Kelly 1-0, D Murphy 0-2, T O’Neill, J Ingram 0-1 each.

==== Leinster round 2 ====
27 April 2024 Round 2	Kildare	0-16 - 2-19	Laois	Hawkfield Centre of Excellence
	Fionn Maher 0-10 (8f), K Harrington 0-2, S Cramer, T Ryan, F O Dulaing, C O’Grady 0-1 each.	Report	B Deegan 0-6 (6f), C Fitzpatrick 1-1, J Quinlan 1-2, J Cuddy 0-3 (3f), C Comerford 0-2, J Breen, Colm Byrne, Cormac Byrne, A Phelan, B Duggan 0-1 each.

28 April 2024 Round 2	Westmeath	1-14 - 1-31	Dublin	TEG Cusack Park
	D O’Reilly 1-4, D Williams 0-7 (6f), B McCabe, D McCormack, P Clarke 0-1 each.	Report	D Ó Dúlaing 1-4 (0-3f), D Purcell, J Conroy 0-5 each, C O’Riain 0-4, N Hogan 0-3, D Bannan, B Kenny, L Garrigan 0-2 each, O Gaffney, C Rock, C Groarke, E Keys 0-1 each.

==== Leinster quarter-finals ====
8 May 2024 Quarter-final	Dublin	0-18 - 0-14	Wexford	Parnell Park
	D O Dulaing (0-9, 7 frees, 1 65); N Hogan, J Conroy (0-3 each); B Kenny (0-2); O Gaffney (0-1).	Report	S Rowley (0-6, 5 frees); S Roche (1 free), E Whelan (0-2 each); A Moran, E Wickham, C Parker, C Byrne (0-1 each).

8 May 2024 Quarter-final	Offaly	1-28 - 2-09	Laois	Glenisk O'Connor Park
	A Screeney 0-15 (0-11f), D Bourke 1-3, S Rigney 0-4, C Spain 0-3 (0-1 sideline), A Kavanagh 0-2, B Egan 0-1.	Report	Cormac Byrne 2-1, C Comerford 0-2, C Hogan 0-2, J Quinlan 0-1, Colin Byrne 0-1, J Cuddy 0-1f.

==== Leinster semi-finals ====
15 May 2024 Semi-final	Dublin	4-17 - 0-20	Galway	Laois Hire O'Moore Park
	D Ó Dúlaing (1-6, 0-4f, 0-1 65), D Purcell (2-1, 0-1 sideline), C Newton (1-1), C Ó Riain (0-2), J Conroy (0-2), F Murphy (0-2), C Dolan (0-1), N Hogan (0-1), C Kennedy (0-1)	Report	C Dolphin (0-4, 0-3f, 0-1 65), C Whelan (0-3), M Tarpey (0-3), J Cosgrove (0-2), O Lohan (0-1), C Killeen (0-2), P Mac Carthaigh (0-1), V Morgan (0-1), M Burke (0-1), R Burke (0-1), J Rabbitte (0-1)

15 May 2024 Semi-final	Offaly	2-17 - 2-16	Kilkenny	Glenisk O'Connor Park
	A Screeney 0-10 (0-8 f, 0-1 65), S Rigney 2-3, C King 0-1, D Shirley 0-1, D Bourke 0-1, A Kavanagh 0-1.	Report	H Shine 1-9 (1-6f, 0-1 65), N Shortall 1-0, M Murphy 0-2, J Walsh 0-1, R Glynn 0-1, C Hackett 0-1, G Dunne 0-1, D Queally 0-1.

==== Leinster final ====
22 May 2024 Final	Dublin	1-15 - 1-18	Offaly	Laois Hire O'Moore Park
	D O Dulaing (0-6, 2 65s, 2 frees); C Rock (1-0); N Hogan, B Kenny (0-3 each); D Purcell, C O Riain, J Conroy (0-1 each).	Report	A Screeney (0-9, 7 frees); S Rigney (1-1); D Bourke (0-4, 1 free); C Spain, C Doyle, E Burke, D Shirley (0-1 each).

== Munster Under-20 Hurling Championship ==
=== Munster group stage ===
==== Munster group stage table ====
Advance to Munster final Advance to Munster semi-final

Team	Matches				Score			Pts
Team	Pld	W	D	L	For	Against	Diff	Pts
Tipperary	4	3	0	1	97	71	26	6
Clare	4	3	0	1	96	80	16	6
Cork	4	3	0	1	95	90	5	6
Limerick	4	1	0	3	87	97	-10	2
Waterford	4	0	0	4	61	98	-37	0

==== Munster group stage results ====
5 April 2024 Round 1	Clare	2-17 - 2-15	Limerick	O'Garney Park
	M Collins (2-1), C Whelan (0-7, 6f), S Rynne (0-3), S Woods (0-1), E Gunning (0-1), N O'Farrell (0-2), R Kilroy (0-1), J O'Neill (0-1).	Report	O O'Farrell (1-7, 6f), R O'Farrell (1-1), C Hayes (0-3), D Ferland (0-1), D Fitzgerald (0-1), F Fitzgerald (0-1), D Coughlan (0-1).

5 April 2024 Round 1	Waterford	1-10 - 0-21	Cork	Fraher Field
	C Treen (0-8, 0-7 frees); C Tobin (1-0); P Fitzgerald (0-2, 0-1 free).	Report	J Leahy (0-10, 0-8 frees); W Buckley (0-3); D Healy (0-2); P O’Sullivan (0-1 pen), Ben Walsh, M Finn (0-1 free), T O’Connell, D Cremin, R O’Sullivan (0-1).

12 April 2024 Round 2	Cork	2-22 - 1-19	Clare	Páirc Uí Chaoimh
	J Leahy 1-6 (0-2f), W Buckley 0-8 (0-3f, 0-1 65), M Finn 0-3, R O’Sullivan 1-0, J Dwyer, E O’Leary 0-2 each, D Healy 0-1.	Report	C Whelan 0-10 (0-8f), J Organ 1-0, R Kiroy 0-2, S Rynne J O’Neill, J Hegarty, N O’Farrell, M Collins, R O’Connor, R Keane 0-1 each.

12 April 2024 Round 2	Limerick	1-17 - 3-18	Tipperary	Mick Neville Park
	H Flanagan (1-1, 1-0 pen); O O’Farrell (3f), C Scully (1f, 1 ‘65) (0-3 each); C Hayes, M Riordan (2f) (0-2 each); M Fitzgerald, S O’Brien, F Fitzgerald, W Kearns, D Ferland and V Harrington (0-1 each).	Report	D McCarthy (1-9, 1-0 pen, 7f); O O’Donoghue (1-2), S Butler (1-0), C Martin (0-3), C English (0-2), R Connolly and P McCormack (1f) (0-1 each).

19 April 2024 Round 3	Waterford	0-15 - 1-21	Tipperary	Fraher Field
	M O Mathuna 0-6 (4fs, 1 65), C Treen (2fs), M Morrissey 0-3 each, C Keane 0-2, C Ryan 0-1.	Report	D McCarthy 0-7 (3fs, 2 65s), O O'Donoghue 1-3, S Butler, C Martin 0-3 each, C English 0-2, S O'Farrell, A Daly, E Craddock 0-1

26 April 2024 Round 3	Cork	1-25 - 2-20	Limerick	Páirc Uí Chaoimh
	J Leahy 0-14 (0-10 f), D Healy 0-5, Barry Walsh 1-0, W Buckley 0-2, C Tobin, Ben Walsh, T O’Connell, E O’Leary 0-1 each.	Report	O O’Farrell 0-9 (0-6 f, 0-1 65), F Fitzgerald 1-2, S O’Brien, C Scully (0-2 f) 0-3 each, T Boddy 1-0 f, V Harrington, R O’Farrell, H Flanagan 0-1 each.

3 May 2024 Round 4	Tipperary	3-20 - 0-18	Cork	FBD Semple Stadium
	S Butler (3-1); D McCarthy (0-6, 0-6 frees); P McCormack (0-1 sc), O O’Donoghue (0-3 each); C Martin, S O’Farrell (0-2 each); E Horgan (0-1 free), A Daly, C English (0-1 each).	Report	J Leahy (0-7, 0-6 frees); W Buckley, J Dwyer (0-3 each); A O’Sullivan, D Healy (0-2 each); Barry Walsh, T Wilk (0-1 each).

4 May 2024 Round 4	Clare	2-27 - 1-11	Waterford	Cusack Park
	C Whelan (0-12, 9 f); J Organ (1-5); S Rynne (0-4); M Collins (1-0); N O’Farrell (0-2); J Hegarty, E Gunning, J Moylan, J O’Neill (0-1) each.	Report	C Treen (0-6, f); C Keane (1-1), D Lalor, E Spellman, M Mahony J Power (0-1) each.

10 May 2024 Round 5	Limerick	0-20 - 1-16	Waterford	Mick Neville Park
	O O'Farrell 0-6 (0-2 frees), C Scully 0-6 (0-2 frees), S O'Brien 0-4, V Harrington 0-2, R O'Farrell and C Hayes 0-1 each.	Report	P Fitzgerald 0-11 (0-9 frees), J Twomey 1-1, M Mahony, R Dobbyn, S Mackey and M Morrissey 0-1 each

10 May 2024 Round 5	Tipperary	1-14 - 0-18	Clare	FBD Semple Stadium
	D McCarthy (0-6, 0-5 frees, 0-1 ‘65); O O’Donoghue (1-1); P McCormack (0-3); E Horgan (0-1 free), S O’Farrell, C Martin, S Butler (0-1 each).	Report	C Whelan (0-16, 0-10 frees); R Keane, N O’Farrell (0-1 each).

=== Munster knockout stage ===
==== Munster semi-final ====
17 May 2024 Semi-final	Clare	2-16 - 1-23	Cork	Cusack Park
	C Whelan 0-7 (0-4 f, 0-1 65), D Stritch 2-1, J O’Neill, N O’Farrell, S Rynne 0-2 each, R Kilroy, M Collins 0-1 each.		W Buckley 0-9 (0-3 f), J Leahy 0-7 (0-6f), B O’Flynn 1-0, Barry Walsh, D Healy 0-2 each, A O’Sullivan, H O’Connor, T Wilk 0-1 each.

==== Munster final ====
24 May 2024 Final	Tipperary	1-19 - 0-21	Cork	TUS Gaelic Grounds
	D McCarthy (0-10, 0-6 frees, 0-1 ‘65); O O’Donoghue (1-2); S O’Farrell, C Foley (0-3 each); S Butler (0-1).	Report	J Leahy (0-6, 0-4 frees); W Buckley (0-1 free), D Healy (0-3 each); D O’Sullivan, R O’Sullivan (0-2 each); Ben Walsh, M Finn, T Wilk, H O’Connor, Barry Walsh (0-1 each).

== All-Ireland Under-20 Hurling Championship ==
=== All-Ireland final ===
1 June 2024 Final	Offaly	2-20 - 2-14	Tipperary	UPMC Nowlan Park
	A Screeney (0-12, 8 frees, 3 65s); D Bourke (1-3); S Rigney (1-0); B Egan (0-2); C King, C Spain, R Kelly (0-1 each).	Report	D McCarthy (1-5, 1-0 pen, 0-4 frees); S Butler (1-1); C Foley (0-3); O O’Donoghue (0-2); C English, S O’Farrell, C Martin (0-1 each).	Attendance: 25,825; Referee: S Stack (Dublin)

== Statistics ==
=== Top scorers ===
Overall

Rank	Player	County	Tally	Total	Matches	Average
1	Adam Screeney	Offaly	1-62	65	6	10.83
2	Jack Leahy	Cork	1-50	53	6	8.83
3	Conor Whelan	Clare	0-52	52	5	10.40
4	Darragh McCarthy	Tipperary	2-43	49	6	8.17
5	Diarmaid Ó Dúlaing	Dublin	2-37	43	6	7.16
6	Fionn Maher	Kildare	5-24	39	4	9.75
7	David Williams	Westmeath	2-31	37	4	9.25
8	David O'Reilly	Westmeath	6-14	32	4	8.00
9	Oisín O'Farrell	Limerick	1-25	28	4	7.00
9	Ben Deegan	Laois	0-28	28	4	7.00
9	William Buckley	Cork	0-28	28	6	4.66

Single game

Rank	Player	Club	Tally	Total	Opposition
1	Fionn Maher	Kildare	3-08	17	Meath
2	Conor Whelan	Clare	0-16	16	Tipperary
3	Adam Screeney	Offaly	0-15	15	Laois
4	Gearóid Dunne	Kilkenny	4-02	14	Laois
4	Aaron Niland	Galway	2-08	14	Dublin
4	Jack Leahy	Cork	0-14	14	Limerick
4	Ben Deegan	Laois	0-14	14	Wexford
8	Adam Screeney	Offaly	0-12	12	Tipperary
8	Harry Shine	Kilkenny	1-09	12	Offaly
8	Darragh McCarthy	Tipperary	1-09	12	Limerick
8	Conor Whelan	Clare	0-12	12	Waterford
