= 2023 All-Ireland Under-20 Hurling Championship final =

2023 All-Ireland Under-20 Hurling Championship Final
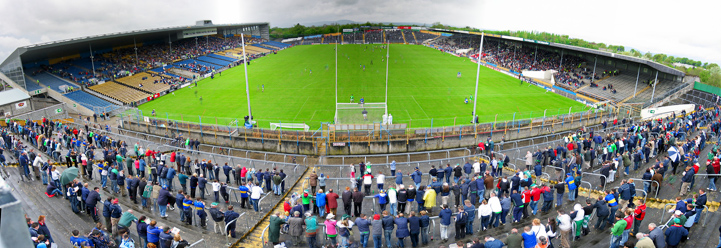
- Event: 2023 All-Ireland Under-20 Hurling Championship
Cork	Offaly
2-22	3-13
- Date: 4 June 2023
- Venue: FBD Semple Stadium, Thurles
- Man of the Match: William Buckley
- Referee: Chris Mooney (Dublin)
- Attendance: 29,380

The 2023 All-Ireland Under-20 Hurling Championship final was a hurling match that was played on 4 June 2023 to determine the winners of the 2023 All-Ireland Under-20 Hurling Championship, the 60th season of the All-Ireland Under-20 Hurling Championship, a tournament organised by the Gaelic Athletic Association for the champion teams of Leinster and Munster. The final was contested by Cork of Munster and Offaly of Leinster.

Not only was the All-Ireland final between Cork and Offaly the first ever All-Ireland final meeting between the two teams, but it was also their first ever championship meeting. Strong favourites Cork were hoping to claim a first title since 2021, while Offaly were hoping to claim their first ever title, the bulk of this team having played in the 2022 minor final loss to Tipperary.

== Summary ==
Offaly started the brighter and Adam Screeney led the Cork full back line a merry dance while landing Offaly's first three points, two from frees he won himself and one from play. Cork employed aggressive tactics in the early exchanges with Screeney being particularly targeted on and off the ball with rough treatment.

Dan Ravenhill added another to make it 0-4 to 0-1 before a mistake in the Offaly back line allowed Cork to gain possession,Ben Cunningham’s low drive was saved by Mark Troy, only for Diarmuid Healy to score a goal on the rebound. Cork full back Shane Kingston, who escaped a yellow card in the early minutes for a cynical foul on Screeney, was fortunate just to see yellow for a high elbow to the head of the onrushing Cormac Egan which resulted in Egan having to go off at half time. Screeney had won possession on the wing and beat his man before passing to Egan. Dan Ravenhill expertly dispatched the resultant penalty to the net. Screeney’s movement and Offaly’s accurate delivery caused Cork problems early on, and Screeney produced a magnificent score from the wing to make it 1-5 to 1-4. Screeney then beautifully teed up Cormac Egan for a goal chance which was well saved by Cork goalkeeper Brion Sanderson, Ravenhill nailing the resultant 65 for a one point lead. Cork earned three yellow cards in the opening half due to some cynical fouling of Offaly sharpshooter Screeney, although it could easily have been more. Manager Ben O'Connor was also booked. Screeney scored two more frees to leave the gap at two points, 1-8 to 1-6. It was at this point that Cork moved Eoin Downey into a sweeper position and this reaped rich dividends for the rebels. Cork scored five of the final six points from Micheál Mullins, David Cremin, Cunningham, Jack Leahy, and Tadhg O’Connell to lead by 1–11 to 1-09.

From the restart, team captain Micheál Mullins played a one-two with midfield partner Tadhg O’Connell and drove through a static Offaly defence before firing a shot to the net for a goal after only 14 seconds. Further points followed from Cunningham (three), Jack Leahy and William Buckley as they moved 11 in front. Conor Doyle fired to the net after some smart build up to give Offaly a faint hope of a comeback with 15 minutes remaining, 2-17 to 2-10, but Cork never looked in danger. The sides traded points before a late Shane Rigney goal arrived with the final puck,leaving the final score 2-22 to 3-13.

Cork's All-Ireland victory was their first in two years and their third in four seasons. It was also their fifth All-Ireland final appearance in six seasons. The win gave them their 14th All-Ireland title overall and put them further ahead on the all-time roll of honour.

=== Details ===
4 June
15:00

Cork	2-22 - 3-13	Offaly
B Cunningham 0-10 (0-6 f), W Buckley, J Leahy 0-4 each, M Mullins, D Healy 1-1 each, T O’Connell, A O’Sullivan 0-1 each.		A Screeney 0-8 (0-6 f), D Ravenhill 1-5 (1-0 penalty, 0-2 f, 0-1 65), C Doyle, S Rigney 1-0 each.

FBD Semple Stadium
Attendance: 29,380
Referee: C Mooney (Dublin)
