= 2023 All-Ireland Under-20 Hurling Championship =

Gaelic games championship

Championship Details
- Dates: 25 March - 4 June 2023
- Teams: 17

All Ireland Champions
- Winners: Cork (14th win)
- Captain: Micheál Mullins
- Manager: Ben O'Connor

All Ireland Runners-up
- Runners-up: Offaly
- Captain: Charlie Mitchell
- Manager: Leo O'Connor

Provincial Champions
- Munster: Cork
- Leinster: Offaly
- Ulster: Antrim
- Connacht: Not Played

Championship Statistics
- Matches Played: 38
- Total Goals: 104 (2.73 per game)
- Total Points: 1293 (34.02 per game)
- Top Scorer: Adam Screeney (2-59)

The 2023 All-Ireland Under-20 Hurling Championship was the fifth staging of the All-Ireland Under-20 Championship and the 60th staging overall of a hurling championship for players between the minor and senior grades. The championship ran from 25 March to 4 June 2023.

Kilkenny entered the championship as the defending champions, however, they were beaten by Wexford in the Leinster semi-final.

The final was played on 4 June 2023 at FBD Semple Stadium in Thurles, between Cork and Offaly, in what was their first ever championship meeting. Cork won the match by 2–22 to 3–13 to claim their 14th championship title overall and a first title in two years.

Offaly's Adam Screeney was the championship's top scorer with 2-59.

== Leinster Under-20 Hurling Championship ==
=== Leinster qualifier ===
18 March 2023 Qualifier	Antrim	0-23 - 2-09	Down	Dunsilly COE
		Report

=== Leinster tier 1 ===
==== Tier 1 group table ====
Advance to Leinster semi-final Advance to Leinster quarter-final

Pos	Team	Pld	W	D	L	SF	SA	Diff	Pts
1	Kilkenny	3	2	0	1	79	74	5	4
2	Dublin	3	2	0	1	67	59	8	4
3	Galway	3	1	0	2	72	77	-5	2
4	Wexford	3	1	0	2	58	66	-8	2

==== Tier 1 group fixtures and results ====
8 April 2023 Round 1	Wexford	2-17 - 0-20	Kilkenny	Chadwicks Wexford Park
	C Byrne (0-4f, 0-2, 65s) 1-6; L Murphy 1-4; C Byrne-Dunbar, J J Twamley 0-2 each; C Foley, D Purcell, J Redmond 0-1 each.	Report	D Queally (5f, 1, 65) 0-6; L Connellan, T Dunne, K Doyle 0-2 each; E Lyng, J Fitzpatrick, C Beirne, J Walsh, C Hackett, J Neary, H Shine, J Carroll 0-1 each.	Referee: K Brady (Louth)

8 April 2023 Round 1	Dublin	1-19 - 1-17	Galway	St. Brendan's Park
	J Conroy 1-3, D Ó Dúlaing 0-6 (3f), J O’Brien 0-4, C Ó Riain 0-2, B Kenny, C Donovan, N Clerkin, O Gaffney 0-1 apiece.	Report	L Collins 0-6 (5f), L Leen 1-1, D Davoren, C Molloy 0-3 each, T Killeen, G Lee, O Lohan, R Davitt 0-1 apiece.	Referee: E Furlong (Wexford)

15 April 2023 Round 2	Galway	3-20 - 5-20	Kilkenny	Glenisk O'Connor Park
	L Collins (1-10, eight frees), G Lee (1-2), D Shaughnessy (1-1), G Thomas, R Burke (0-2 each), T Killeen, S O’Hanlon, C Molloy (0-1 each).	Report	B Drennan (2-12, seven frees and three 65’s), T Clifford (1-2), C Hackett, G Dunne (1-0 each), H Shine (0-2), J Fitzpatrick, T Dunne, B Reid, K Doyle (0-1 each)	Referee: J McGrath (Westmeath)

15 April 2023 Round 2	Dublin	1-20 - 0-15	Wexford	Parnell Park
	D Ó Dúlaing 0-9, J Conroy 1-2, J O'Brien 0-3, C Ó Riain 0-2, O Gaffney 0-2, B Kenny 0-2.	Report	C Byrne 0-5, J Redmond 0-3, D Carley 0-1, C Fitzgerald 0-1, S O'Hagan 0-1, JJ Twamley 0-1, T Brohan 0-1, C Foley 0-1.

21 April 2023 Round 3	Galway	1-20 - 1-17	Wexford	Netwatch Cullen Park
	R Burke 0-12 (10fs), G Lee 0-3, R Davitt (1-0), C Molloy 0-2, G Thomas, R Killilea, T Lee 0-1 each.	Report	J Redmond 1-5 (0-4fs), S O’Hagan, D Farrell, C Byrne Dunbar, C Byrne 0-2 each, L Murphy 0-1, D Carley 0-1, L Roche 0-1, S Rowley 0-1.	Referee: D Hughes (Kilkenny)

22 April 2023 Round 3	Kilkenny	1-21 - 2-16	Dublin	UPMC Nowlan Park
	G Dunne 0-6, T Dunne 1-0, J Fitzpatrick 0-2, C Beirne 0-2, H Shine 0-2, B Reid 0-2, L Connellan 0-2, D Walsh 0-2, C Hackett 0-1, K Doyle 0-1, E Lyng 0-1.	Report	D Ó Dúlaing 0-5 (2f), J O’Brien 0-4, J Conroy 1-1, L Garrigan 1-0, O Gaffney 0-2, N Clerkin, N Hogan, L O’Loughlin, C Brennan 0-1 apiece.

=== Leinster tier 2 ===
==== Tier 2 group 1 table ====
Advance to Leinster preliminary quarter-final

Pos	Team	Pld	W	D	L	SF	SA	Diff	Pts
1	Offaly	3	3	0	0	74	37	37	6
2	Westmeath	3	2	0	1	72	55	17	4
3	Antrim	3	1	0	2	60	52	8	2
4	Meath	3	0	0	3	28	90	-62	0

==== Tier 2 group 1 fixtures and results ====
1 April 2023 Round 1	Offaly	2-22 - 1-17	Westmeath	Glenisk O'Connor Park
	A Screeney 0-11 (11f), C Mitchell 2-2, C King, D Ravenhill, S Rigney and C Doyle 0-2 each, S Bourke 0-1.	Report	D Williams 0-10 (10f), M Cunningham 1-2, D O'Reilly 0-2, C McCarthy, P Clarke, E Cunneen 0-1 each.

6 April 2023 Round 2	Meath	0-09 - 2-17	Offaly	St. Loman's Park
	T Shine, J Cole and P Barnwell 0-2 each, D Horan, D Heffernan and D Shine 0-1 each	Report	A Screeney 0-9, D Bourke 1-1, D Temple 0-3, S Rigney 1-0, C King, L Quinn and A Watkins 0-1 each.

8 April 2023 Round 2	Westmeath	2-14 - 3-08	Antrim	TEG Cusack Park
	D Williams 1-4 (0-2f, 0-1'65'), D O'Reilly 1-3, P Murphy, E Cunneen 0-2 each, C McKeogh, B McGrath, M Doherty 0-1 each.	Report	D Davoren 0-5 (5f), N McGarel, A Scullion 1-1 each, S McIntosh 1-0 (sideline), C McGarry 0-1 (f).	Referee: G McGrath (Wexford)

12 April 2023 Round 1	Meath	0-09 - 6-17	Antrim	St. Loman's Park
	D Heffernan (0-2), D Shine (0-2); M Horan (0-2), T Shine (0-2), R Fagan (0-1).	Report	J McLaughlin (2-3), A Scullion (2-1), N McGarel (1-3), A McGarry (0-6); S McIntosh (1-0), C McKeown (0-2), E McFerran (0-1), J McCloskey (0-1).

15 April 2023 Round 3	Westmeath	5-17 - 0-10	Meath	TEG Cusack Park
	D Williams 1-9 (0-9f), P Clarke 2-1, D O'Reilly, M Cunningham 1-1 each, E Cunneen 0-3 (1 sideline), M Doherty, P Murphy 0-1 each.	Report	T Shine 0-6 (6f), P Barnwell, N Conroy, M Horan, L Byrne 0-1 each.

15 April 2023 Round 3	Offaly	2-17 - 0-08	Antrim	Darver Centre of Excellence
	A Screeney 0-8 (2f and 1 '65'), D Bourke 0-5 (1f), J Hoctor 1-1, C Mitchell 1-0, C Spain, S Rigney and N Furlong 0-1 each.	Report	A McGarry 0-2 (1f an 1 '65'), B McGarry, J McLaughlin, C McGarry (f), N McGarel, J McCloskey (f) and R McCollum 0-1 each.	Referee: D Ryan

==== Tier 2 group 2 table ====
Advance to Leinster preliminary quarter-final

Pos	Team	Pld	W	D	L	SF	SA	Diff	Pts
1	Laois	3	3	0	0	56	26	30	6
2	Kildare	3	2	0	1	42	41	1	4
3	Kerry	3	1	0	1	46	57	-11	2
4	Carlow	3	0	0	2	35	68	-33	0

==== Tier 2 group 1 fixtures and results ====
31 March 2023 Round 1	Kildare	0-11 - 1-16	Laois	Hawkfield COE
	C Sheridan 0-5 (2 frees, 65), D Guerin 0-2, A Goss 0-2, C Kirwan 0-1 C Boran 0-1.	Report	J Cuddy 1-1, N Quinlan 0-4, P Brennan 0-3 (2 frees), C Dunne 0-2 (1 free), C Comerford 0-1, C Murphy 0-1.	Referee: J McGrath

1 April 2023 Round 1	Carlow	0-10 - 2-10	Kerry	Laois Hire O'Moore Park
	D Townsend (0-3), E English (0-2), C Beck (0-1), J Doyle (0-1), S Wall (0-1), R Dermody (0-1), J Behan (0-1).	Report	R Walsh (1-5), S Brosnan (1-2), C Litchfield (0-1), S McGrath (0-1), F O’Sullivan (0-1), C Murphy (0-1).	Referee: E Furlong (Wexford)

6 April 2023 Round 2	Laois	3-27 - 0-15	Carlow	Laois Hire O'Moore Park
	C Dunne 0-13, J Quinlan 0-5, N Quinlan 1-1, P Brennan 1-1, B Murphy 0-2, C Comerford 0-1, C Byrne 1-1, J Pearson 0-1, B Duggan 0-1.		D Townsend 0-8, E Kealy 0-3, D Murphy 0-2.

10 April 2023 Round 2	Kildare	0-15 - 1-09	Kerry	Laois Hire O'Moore Park
	C Sheridan 0-4 (3 frees), C Boran 0-4, C Keogh 0-3, B Hennessy, D Guerin, C Flanagan and K Harrington 0-1 each.	Report	R Walsh 0-9 (7f); E Walsh 1-0.	Referee: P Dunne (Laois)

15 April 2023 Round 3	Laois	2-16 - 1-15	Kerry	Laois Hire O'Moore Park
	C Dunne 0-7 (three frees), C Byrne 1-1, J Cuddy 1-0, C Murphy and J Quinlan 0-3 each, N Quinlan 0-2.	Report	R Walsh 0-12 (nine frees), E Walsh 1-0, S Brosnan 0-2, A Kavanagh 0-1.

15 April 2023 Round 3	Carlow	1-07 - 1-13	Kildare	Netwatch Cullen Park
	D Townsend 0-6 (fs); E Doyle 1-0; J Doyle 0-1.	Report	C Sheridan 0-7 (2fs); J Dolan 1-0; C Kehoe, C Treacy, K Harrington, D Guerin, C Boran, F Maher 0-1 each.

=== Leinster preliminary quarter-finals ===
21 April 2023 Prelim quarter-final	Offaly	2-20 - 1-10	Kildare	Glenisk O'Connor Park
	A Screeney 1-8 (0-7f), C Doyle 0-5 (0-1f), S Rigney 1-2, A Kavanagh 0-2, D Bourke 0-1, S Bourke 0-1, C Spain 0-1.	Report	C Kehoe 0-3, C Sheridan 0-3 (0-2f), F Maher 1-0, K Harrington 0-1, C Kirwan 0-1, D Guerin 0-1, C Treacy 0-1.	Referee: P Dunne (Laois)

21 April 2023 Prelim quarter-final	Laois	1-19 - 0-22; Penalties: 2-3	Westmeath	Laois Hire O'Moore Park
	C Dunne 1-10 (0-9f; 0-1 '65'), C Comerford 0-4, P Brennan 0-2 (2f), N Quinlan, J Quinlan and B Duggan 0-1 each.	Report	D Williams 0-14 (11f; 1 '65'), P Clarke 0-3, D O'Reilly 0-3, E Cunneen and P Murphy 0-1 each.

=== Leinster quarter-finals ===
29 April 2023 Quarter-final	Offaly	3-20 - 2-17	Galway	Glenisk O'Connor Park
	S Rigney 1-3, C Mitchell 0-5 (0-4f), J Hoctor 1-2, A Screeney 0-3 (0-2f), C Egan 1-0, C Doyle 0-2, C King 0-2, D Bourke 0-1, T Guinan 0-1, S Bourke 0-1.	Report	R Burke 0-6 (0-4f, 0-2 65s), R Davitt 1-1, L Leen 1-1, D Shaughnessy 0-3, D Davoren 0-3, C Molloy 0-2, O Lohan 0-1.	Referee: C Flynn (Westmeath)

29 April 2023 Quarter-final	Westmeath	3-12 - 3-17	Wexford	TEG Cusack Park
	D Williams 1-9 (0-6f, 0-1'65'), B McGrath, D O'Reilly 1-0 each, E Cunneen, M Cunningham, J Murtagh 0-1 each.	Report	Cian Byrne 0-9 (7f), J Redmond 2-2, C Byrne Dunbar 0-3, Cillian Byrne 1-0, S Rowley, L Murphy, S O'Hagan 0-1 each.	Referee: P Dunne (Laois)

=== Leinster semi-finals ===
10 May 2023 Semi-final	Kilkenny	2-13 - 1-18	Wexford	UPMC Nowlan Park
	G Dunne (1-6, 3f and 1 '65), E O'Brien (1-0), T Clifford (0-3), L Connellan (0-2), E Lyng, K Doyle (0-1 each).	Report	Cian Byrne (0-10, 6f and 1 '65), JJ Twamley (1-0), C Byrne Dunbar (0-3), M Dundon (0-2), L Murphy, S O'Hagan, Cillian Byrne (0-1 each).	Referee: C Mooney (Dublin)

10 May 2023 Semi-final	Offaly	1-19 - 2-12	Dublin	Glenisk O'Connor Park
	C Mitchell 1-9 (0-5f, 0-1 65), J Hoctor 0-2, C Spain 0-2, D Bourke 0-2, D Ravenhill 0-2 (0-1f), S Bourke 0-1, S Rigney 0-1.	Report	D Ó Dúlaing 0-5 (0-3f), O Gaffney 1-1, C Rock 1-1, J O’Brien 0-1, N Clerkin 0-1, J Conroy 0-1, S Gallagher 0-1, N Hogan 0-1.	Referee: E Furlong (Wexford)

=== Leinster final ===
17 May 2023 Final	Offaly	1-21 - 0-22	Wexford	Netwatch Cullen Park
	A Screeney 1-12 (0-8f, 1 65), D Ravenhill 0-3 (0-1f), D Bourke 0-2, C Doyle 0-2, C Mitchell 0-1, C King 0-1.	Report	Cian Byrne 0-14 (0-10f), Cillian Byrne 0-2, C Byrne-Dunbar 0-1, D Carley 0-1, S Rowley 0-1, L Murphy 0-1, JJ Twamley 0-1, D Purcell 0-1.	Referee: T Gleeson (Dublin)

== Munster Under-20 Hurling Championship ==
=== Munster table ===
Advance to Munster final Advance to Munster semi-final

Pos	Team	Pld	W	D	L	SF	SA	Diff	Pts
1	Cork	4	4	0	0	100	81	19	8
2	Tipperary	4	2	1	1	95	89	6	5
3	Clare	4	1	2	1	96	87	9	4
4	Limerick	4	1	1	2	80	79	1	3
5	Waterford	4	0	0	4	73	108	-35	0

=== Munster round 1 ===
25 March 2023 Round 1	Clare	0-20 - 0-20	Tipperary	Cusack Park
	K Smyth 0-5 (4fs), P Crotty, N O’Farrell 0-4 each, C Whelan 0-2 (1f), D Lohan, S Rynne, O O’Donnell, D Kennedy, J Collins 0-1 each.	Report	S Ferncombe 0-10 (9fs), E Ryan 0-3, L Shanahan, D Stakelum, C McCormack, J Leamy, S Kenneally, P McGarry, D McCarthy 0-1 each.	Referee: É Stapleton (Limerick)

25 March 2023 Round 1	Waterford	1-14 - 1-18	Limerick	Fraher Field
	P Fitzgerald (1-11, 1-10 frees), M Fitzgerald, T O’Connell and C Treen (0-1 each).	Report	P O’Donovan (0-6, 0-5 frees), C Hayes (1-2), J Kirby and A Fitzgerald (0-2 each), B Duff, A English, F Fitzgerald, S O’Brien, L Dennehy and L Lynch (0-1 each).	Referee: C Doyle (Tipperary)

=== Munster round 2 ===
29 March 2023 Round 2	Limerick	1-19 - 1-19	Clare	TUS Gaelic Grounds
	P O'Donovan 0-12 (6 frees, '65,) A English 1-1, E Hurley 0-2, A Fitzgerald, F Fitzgerald, J Fitzgerald and S O'Brien 0-1 each.	Report	K Smyth 0-7 (4 frees, '65), P Crotty 1-3, S Rynne 0-3, C Cleary and J O'Neill 0-2 each, D Kennedy and O O'Donnell 0-1 each.	Referee: N Barry (Waterford)

29 March 2023 Round 2	Cork	1-17 - 1-13	Waterford	Páirc Uí Chaoimh
	B Cunningham (0-7, 0-5 frees, 0-1 ‘65); C Walsh (1-3); A O’Sullivan (0-3); M Finn, R O’Sullivan, B Keating, E O’Leary (0-1 each).	Report	P Fitzgerald (0-8, 0-4 frees); J Fitzgerald (1-1); C Treen (0-2); M Mullaney, F Roche (0-1 each).	Referee: M Kennedy (Tipperary)

=== Munster round 3 ===
5 April 2023 Round 3	Cork	1-28 - 1-19	Tipperary	Páirc Uí Chaoimh
	B Cunningham (1-13, 0-8 frees), W Buckley and D Healy (0-3 each), J Leahy, C Walsh and T O’Connell (0-2 each), D O’Sullivan, R O’Sullivan and E O’Leary (0-1 each).	Report	J Leamy (0-8, 0-6 frees, 0-1 65), S Kenneally (1-2), P McGarry (0-3), D Stakelum (0-2), J Caesar, E Ryan, T Cahill and D McCarthy (0-1 each).	Referee: N Malone (Clare)

13 April 2023 Round 3	Waterford	0-18 - 2-26	Clare	Fraher Field
	P Fitzgerald 0-7 (6fs), T O'Connell 0-4, C Keane, C Treen 0-2 each, M Mullaney, J Booth, E Foley 0-1 each.	Report	K Smyth 1-9 (8fs), S Dunford 1-3, J O'Neill 0-4, S Rynne 0-3, O O'Donnell 0-2, O Cahill, D Lohan, P Crotty, D Kennedy, K Hartigan 0-1 each.	Referee: K Jordan (Tipperary)

=== Munster round 4 ===
19 April 2023 Round 4	Clare	0-22 - 1-24	Cork	Cusack Park
	K Smyth (0-6, 0-4 frees); O’Donnell (0-3); J O’Neill, P Crotty, D Kennedy, N O’Farrell (0-2 each); J Collins, S Rynne, S Dunford, C Whelan (0-1 free), C Cleary (0-1 each).	Report	B Cunningham (1-7, 0-7 frees); D Healy, T Wilk (0-4 each); T O’Connell, W Buckley, D Cremin (0-2 each); S Kingston, C Walsh, R O’Sullivan (0-1 each).	Referee: C Doyle (Tipperary)

21 April 2023 Round 4	Tipperary	1-15 - 0-16	Limerick	FBD Semple Stadium
	J Leamy (0-7,5fs), S Kenneally (1-2), E Ryan (0-3), D Stakelum, P McGarry, D Corbett (0-1 each).	Report	P O Donovan (0-9, 7fs), O O'Farrell (0-2), S O Brien, C Hayes, R Lyons, A Fitzgerald, C Scully(0-1 each).	Referee: N Barry (Waterford)

=== Munster round 5 ===
28 April 2023 Round 5	Limerick	0-21 - 1-19	Cork	TUS Gaelic Grounds
	P O’Donovan (0-11, 0-8 frees); A English (0-3); S O’Brien, O O’Farrell (0-2 each); A Fitzgerald, C Hayes, J Kirby (0-1 each).	Report	B Cunningham (0-8, 0-3 frees, 0-1 ‘65); D Healy (1-1); W Buckley, A O’Sullivan (0-3 each); T O’Connell (0-2); T Wilk, R O’Sullivan (0-1 each).	Referee: N Malone (Clare)

28 April 2023 Round 5	Tipperary	3-26 - 3-13	Waterford	FBD Semple Stadium
	J Leamy (2-6, 0-5 frees); P McGarry (1-4); D Stakelum (0-5); E Ryan (0-4); C Quinn, S Kenneally (0-2 each); R Connolly, D McCarthy, C McCormack (0-1 each).	Report	C Treen (1-8, 1-0 sideline, 0-7 frees); J Twomey (2-1); O Walsh (0-2, 1 free); C Keane, J Booth (0-1 each).	Referee: C O'Regan (Cork)

=== Munster semi-final ===
8 May 2023 Semi-final	Tipperary	0-17 - 3-17	Clare	FBD Semple Stadium
	E Ryan, J Leamy (4f) 0-4 each; Peter McGarry 0-3 (1 sideline); S Kenneally 0-2; D Slattery, C Quinn, D Stakelum, M Fitzpatrick 0-1 each.	Report	K Smyth 2-7 (1-5f, 0-1 65); D Kennedy 1-1; P Crotty 0-3; D Lohan, O Cahill, S Rynne, J O’Neill, N O’Farrell, K Hartigan 0-1 each.	Referee: T Walsh (Waterford)

=== Munster final ===
15 May 2023 Final	Cork	1-23 - 1-21	Clare	TUS Gaelic Grounds
	B Cunningham (0-9, 0-6 frees, 0-1 ‘65); D Healy, T O’Connell (0-3 each); M Mullins (1-0); W Buckley, C Walsh, R O’Sullivan (0-2 each); J Leahy (0-1).	Report	K Smyth (0-11, 0-9 frees); S Rynne (1-1); O O’Donnell (0-3); J O’Neill, P Crotty (0-2 each); N O’Farrell, K Hartigan (0-1 each).	Referee: M Kennedy (Tipperary)

== All-Ireland Under-20 Hurling Championship ==
=== All-Ireland final ===
4 June 2023 Final	Cork	2-22 - 3-13	Offaly	FBD Semple Stadium
	B Cunningham 0-10 (0-6 f), W Buckley, J Leahy 0-4 each, M Mullins, D Healy 1-1 each, T O’Connell, A O’Sullivan 0-1 each.	Report	A Screeney 0-8 (0-6 f), D Ravenhill 1-5 (1-0 penalty, 0-2 f, 0-1 65), C Doyle, S Rigney 1-0 each_	Attendance: 29,380; Referee: C Mooney (Dublin)

== Statistics ==
=== Top scorers ===
Overall

Rank	Player	County	Tally	Total	Matches	Average
1	Adam Screeney	Offaly	2-59	65	7	9.28
2	Ben Cunningham	Cork	2-54	60	6	10.00
3	David Williams	Westmeath	3-46	55	5	11.00
4	Keith Smyth	Clare	3-45	54	6	9.00
5	Cian Byrne	Wexford	1-46	49	6	8.16
6	Patrick O'Donovan	Limerick	0-38	38	4	9.50
7	Cillian Dunne	Laois	1-32	35	4	8.75
8	Jack Leamy	Tipperary	2-26	32	5	6.40
9	Patrick Fitzgerald	Waterford	1-26	29	3	9.66
9	Ronan Walsh	Kerry	1-26	29	3	9.66

In a single game

Rank	Player	Club	Tally	Total	Opposition
1	Billy Drennan	Kilkenny	2-12	18	Galway
2	Ben Cunningham	Cork	1-13	16	Tipperary
3	Adam Screeney	Offaly	1-12	15	Wexford
4	Patrick Fitzgerald	Waterford	1-11	14	Limerick
4	David Williams	Westmeath	0-14	14	Laois
4	Cian Byrne	Wexford	0-14	14	Offaly
7	Keith Smyth	Clare	2-07	13	Tipperary
7	Cillian Dunne	Laois	1-10	13	Westmeath
7	Cillian Dunne	Laois	0-13	13	Carlow
10	Jack Leamy	Tipperary	2-06	12	Waterford

=== Miscellaneous ===
- The Munster Championship game between Waterford and Limerick, scheduled for 22 March 2023, was postponed by three days due to an unplayable Fraher Field. Waterford's subsequent game against Clare was also postponed for a similar reason.
- Cork's Munster Championship victory put them one ahead of Tipperary and top of the all-time roll of honour with 22 titles.
- Offaly won the Leinster Championship for the first time since 2000.
- The All-Ireland final between Cork and Offaly was their first ever championship meeting.
