= 2024 All-Ireland Under-20 Hurling Championship final =

2024 All-Ireland Under-20 Hurling Championship Final
- Event: 2024 All-Ireland Under-20 Hurling Championship
| Tipperay | Offaly |
| 2-14 | 2-20 |
- Date: 1 June 2024
- Venue: Nowlan Park, Kilkenny
- Referee: Seán Stack (Dublin)
- Attendance: 25,825
- Weather: Sunny

The 2024 All-Ireland Under-20 Hurling Championship final was a hurling match that was played on 1 June to determine the winners of the 2024 All-Ireland Under-20 Hurling Championship, the 61st season of the All-Ireland Under-20 Hurling Championship, a tournament organised by the Gaelic Athletic Association for the champion teams of Leinster and Munster. The final was contested by Tipperary of Munster and Offaly of Leinster.

The final was a sell-out with up to 20,000 supporters attending from Offaly.

The final was held in Nowlan park to mark the anniversary of former GAA president James Nowlan, who died 100 years ago this year, the winners also received the James Nolan Cup. The final was shown live as part of GAA Beo on TG4, presented by Mícheál Ó Domhnaill.

== Match ==
=== Details ===
1 June 2024
19:15

| Tipperary | 2-14 - 2-20 | Offaly |
|---|---|---|
| Darragh McCarthy 1-5 (1-0 pen, 4fs), Senan Butler 1-1, Ciarán Foley 0-3, Oisín O’Donoghue 0-2, Conor Martin 0-1, Cathal English 0-1, Sam O’Farrell 0-1. | Report | Adam Screeney 0-12 (8fs, 3 65s), Dan Bourke 1-3, Barry Egan 1-2, Cathal King 0-1, Colin Spain 0-1, Ruairí Kelly 0-1. |

Nowlan Park
Attendance: 25,825
Referee: Seán Stack (Dublin)
