= 2026 Offaly Senior B Hurling Championship =

Annual hurling competition season

- Dates: 10 July - 3 October 2026
- Teams: 6
- Sponsor: Molloy Environmental Systems
- Champions: Clodiagh Gaels (2nd title); Ruairí Dunne (captain); Ned Casey (manager)
- Runners-up: Seir Kieran; Michael Gilligan (captain); Brian Troy (manager)
- Relegated: Drumcullen

Tournament statistics
- Matches played: 19
- Goals scored: 59 (3.11 per match)
- Points scored: 719 (37.84 per match)

The 2026 Offaly Senior B Hurling Championship was the ninth staging of the Offaly Senior B Hurling Championship since its establishment by the Offaly County Board in 2018. The draw for the group stage placings was made in February 2026. The championship ran from 10 July to 3 October 2026.

Clodiagh Gaels won the championship after defeating Seir Kieran 0-17 to 0-16 in the final to claim their second Senior B championship.

== Team changes ==
=== To Championship ===
Relegated from the Offaly Senior Hurling Championship

- Seir Kieran

Promoted from the Offaly Intermediate Hurling Championship

- Drumcullen

=== From Championship ===
Promoted to the Offaly Senior Hurling Championship

- Lusmagh

Relegated to the Offaly Intermediate Hurling Championship

- Coolderry

== Group stage ==
=== Group stage table ===
Knockout stage Relegation stage

Team	Matches				Score			Pts
Team	Pld	W	D	L	For	Against	Diff	Pts
Seir Kieran	5	4	1	0	141	105	36	9
Clodiagh Gaels	5	3	1	1	120	98	22	7
Clara	5	3	0	2	126	119	7	6
Kilcormac–Killoughey	5	2	1	2	118	120	-2	5
Carrig & Riverstown	5	1	1	3	119	123	-4	3
Drumcullen (R)	5	0	0	5	102	161	-59	0

=== Group stage results ===
10 July 2026 Round 1	Clara	1-18 - 2-22	Clodiagh Gaels	Clara Grounds

12 July 2026 Round 1	Seir Kieran	1-27 - 1-19	Drumcullen	Clareen Grounds

17 July 2026 Round 1	Kilcormac–Killoughey	1-20 - 2-17	Carrig & Riverstown	Kilcormac Grounds

24 July 2026 Round 2	Clodiagh Gaels	0-18 - 2-15	Kilcormac–Killoughey	Clodiagh Gaels GAA Grounds

24 July 2026 Round 2	Carrig & Riverstown	1-19 - 1-28	Seir Kieran	Páirc na Carraige & Baile Uí Lachnáin

26 July 2026 Round 2	Drumcullen	4-12 - 3-25	Clara	Rath Grounds

7 August 2026 Round 3	Kilcormac–Killoughey	1-14 - 3-19	Clara	Ballinamere Grounds
	M Mulrooney 0-6 (6fs), C Lowry 1-0, JK Kilmartin and S Mulrooney (2fs) 0-2 each, R Bracken, S Guinan, D Spain and K Guinan 0-1 each.	Report	C Delaney 0-11 (6fs, 1 s/l, 1 ’65), R Brady 2-1, J Fleming 1-1, B Egan 0-3, C Doyle 0-2, B Cushen 0-1.

8 August 2026 Round 3	Clodiagh Gaels	2-15 - 0-21	Seir Kieran	St Finian's Park

8 August 2026 Round 3	Carrig & Riverstown	4-21 - 1-17	Drumcullen	Crinkle Grounds

19 August 2026 Round 4	Seir Kieran	3-22 - 3-15	Kilcormac–Killoughey	Rath Grounds

22 August 2026 Round 4	Clara	3-18 - 1-19	Carrig & Riverstown	Moystown Grounds

22 August 2026 Round 4	Drumcullen	1-13 - 2-25	Clodiagh Gaels	St Finian's Park

5 September 2026 Round 5	Kilcormac–Killoughey	1-30 - 2-14	Drumcullen	St Rynagh's Park

5 September 2026 Round 5	Clodiagh Gaels	1-19 - 1-16	Carrig & Riverstown	St Finian's Park

5 September 2026 Round 5	Clara	0-16 - 1-25	Seir Kieran	The Mill Field

== Relegation stage ==
=== Relegation final ===
26 September 2026 Relegation final	Drumcullen	0-17 - 4-23	Carrig & Riverstown	St Brendan's Park
	E Gath 0-6f, C Gath 0-5, C Gath 0-3 (0-1 sideline), M Ryan 0-1, J Murray 0-1, J Foley 0-1.	Report	L Hogan 1-11 (0-10f), C Freeman 2-3, C King 1-2, P King 0-1, D Egan 0-1, L Hoare 0-1f, C Larkin 0-1, P Bergin 0-1, B Hoctor 0-1, D Hogan 0-1.

== Knockout stage ==
=== Semi-finals ===
20 September 2026 Semi-final	Clara	2-15 - 2-18	Clodiagh Gaels	Glenisk O'Connor Park
	Cormac Delaney 0-6 (5f), Barry Cushen 1-2, Conor Egan 1-0, Josh Fleming 0-2, Conor Doyle (f), Ciaran Doyle, Marcas Dalton, Barry Egan, Ross Brady 0-1 each.	Report	L Langton 0-8 (7f), M Dillon 1-3, J Keenaghan 1-1, S Brady 0-2, K Kinahan, E Curley, C Brady and S Rattigan 0-1 each.

26 September 2026 Semi-final	Seir Kieran	1-18 - 1-16	Kilcormac–Killoughey	St Brendan's Park
	S Carey 1-10 (0-8f), B Kealey 0-2, L Carey 0-2, D Guinan 0-1, A Hynes 0-1, S Dooley 0-1, B Bergin 0-1.	Report	M Mulrooney 0-10 (0-9f), K Guinan 1-1, S Guinan 0-2, S Leonard 0-1, R Bracken 0-1, JK Kilmartin 0-1.

=== Final ===
3 October 2026 Final	Clodiagh Gaels	0-17 - 0-16	Seir Kieran	Glenisk O'Connor Park
	Liam Langton 0-11 (0-5 Frees), Eoin Dunne 0-3, Kevin Kinahan 0-1 (Free), Sean Brady 0-1, Cathal Brady 0-1.	Report	Sean Carey 0-10 (0-8 Frees, 0-1 ‘65), Luke Carey 0-3, Darragh Guinan 0-1, Adrian Hynes 0-1, Tom Dooley 0-1.
