= 2023 Offaly Senior B Hurling Championship =

Annual hurling competition season

- Dates: 7 July - 30 September 2023
- Teams: 6
- Sponsor: Molloy Environmental
- Champions: Kilcormac–Killoughey (1st title)
- Runners-up: Clodiagh Gaels
- Relegated: Shamrocks

Tournament statistics
- Matches played: 19
- Goals scored: 36 (1.89 per match)
- Points scored: 610 (32.11 per match)

The 2023 Offaly Senior B Hurling Championship was the sixth staging of the Offaly Senior B Hurling Championship since its establishment by the Offaly County Board in 2018. The group stage placings were confirmed on 20 March 2023. The championship ran from 7 July to 30 September 2023.

The final was played on 30 September 2023 at Glenisk O'Connor Park in Tullamore, between Kilcormac–Killoughey and Clodiagh Gaels, in what was their first ever meeting in the final. Kilcormac–Killoughey won the match by 0–12 to 0–08 to claim their first ever championship title. They later declined their automatic right to promotion due to the fact that their first team already participates in the Offaly SHC.

== Team changes ==
=== To Championship ===
Relegated from the Offaly Senior Hurling Championship

- Clodiagh Gaels

Promoted from the Offaly Intermediate Hurling Championship

- Shamrocks

=== From Championship ===
Promoted to the Offaly Senior Hurling Championship

- Tullamore

Relegated to the Offaly Intermediate Hurling Championship

- Drumcullen

== Group stage ==
=== Group stage table ===
Knockout stage Relegation playoff

Team	Matches				Score			Pts
Team	Pld	W	D	L	For	Against	Diff	Pts
Clodiagh Gaels	5	4	0	1	123	90	33	8
Kilcormac–Killoughey	5	4	0	1	104	73	31	8
Lusmagh	5	3	0	2	102	92	31	6
Birr	5	2	0	3	71	96	-25	4
Clara	5	2	0	3	100	94	-6	4
Shamrocks	5	0	0	5	75	130	-55	0

=== Group stage results ===
7 July 2023 Round 1	Kilcormac–Killoughey	2-16 - 0-12	Lusmagh	Doon Grounds

8 July 2023 Round 1	Clodiagh Gaels	1-19 - 1-17	Clara	Glenisk O'Connor Park

8 July 2023 Round 1	Shamrocks	0-16 - 0-19	Birr	Lusmagh Grounds

22 July 2023 Round 2	Clara	1-16 - 2-14	Kilcormac–Killoughey	Glenisk O'Connor Park

22 July 2023 Round 2	Lusmagh	0-23 - 1-12	Shamrocks	Doon Grounds

22 July 2023 Round 2	Birr	2-10 - 0-23	Clodiagh Gaels	Kinnitty Grounds

4 August 2023 Round 3	Lusmagh	1-21 - 2-16	Clodiagh Gaels	Clara Grounds

5 August 2023 Round 3	Shamrocks	0-13 - 1-25	Kilcormac–Killoughey	Lusmagh Grounds

5 August 2023 Round 3	Birr	0-16 - 0-15	Clara	St Rynagh's Park

18 August 2023 Round 4	Kilcormac–Killoughey	1-12 - 0-09	Birr	Drumcullen Grounds

19 August 2023 Round 4	Clara	2-16 - 0-16	Lusmagh	Belmont Grounds

19 August 2023 Round 4	Clodiagh Gaels	4-24 - 0-11	Shamrocks	Glenisk O'Connor Park

3 September 2023 Round 5	Lusmagh	3-18 - 0-11	Birr	St Rynagh's Park

3 September 2023 Round 5	Shamrocks	0-20 - 1-21	Clara	Ballinamere Grounds

3 September 2023 Round 5	Kilcormac–Killoughey	1-16 - 1-17	Clodiagh Gaels	Clareen Grounds

== Knockout stage ==
=== Relegation playoff ===
17 September 2023 Relegation playoff	Clara	3-17 - 0-12	Shamrocks	Ballinamere Grounds

=== Semi-finals ===
16 September 2023 Semi-final	Kilcormac–Killoughey	6-27 - 0-10	Lusmagh	St Brendan's Park

16 September 2023 Semi-final	Birr	0-13 - 0-17	Clodiagh Gaels	Glenisk O'Connor Park

=== Final ===
30 September 2023 Final	Clodiagh Gaels	0-08 - 0-12	Kilcormac–Killoughey	Glenisk O'Connor Park
	D Dunne 0-6 (2 '65's and 3f), C Langton 0-2.	Report	D Hand 0-5 (5f), P Geraghty 0-4 (one sideline), T Guinan, D Currams and A Kavanagh 0-1 each.	Referee: J Deehan (Clara)
