= 2024 Offaly Senior B Hurling Championship =

Annual hurling competition season

- Dates: 19 July - 5 October 2024
- Teams: 6
- Sponsor: Molloy Environmental
- Champions: Kilcormac–Killoughey (2nd title); Shane Melia (captain)
- Runners-up: Clodiagh Gaels; Clint Horan (captain)
- Relegated: Birr

Tournament statistics
- Matches played: 19
- Goals scored: 30 (1.58 per match)
- Points scored: 700 (36.84 per match)

The 2024 Offaly Senior B Hurling Championship was the seventh staging of the Offaly Senior B Hurling Championship since its establishment by the Offaly County Board in 2018. The group stage placings were confirmed on 20 February 2024. The championship ran from 19 July to 5 October 2024.

Kilcormac–Killoughey entered the championship as the defending champions. They declined their automatic right to promotion due to the fact that their first team already participates in the Offaly SHC.

The final was played on 5 October 2024 at Glenisk O'Connor Park in Tullamore, between Kilcormac–Killoughey and Clodiagh Gaels, in what was their second consecutive meeting in the final. Kilcormac–Killoughey won the match by 1–13 to 0–09 to claim their second championship title overall and a second title in succession.

== Team changes ==
=== To Championship ===
Promoted from the Offaly Intermediate Hurling Championship

- Carrig & Riverstown

=== From Championship ===
Relegated to the Offaly Intermediate Hurling Championship

- Shamrocks

== Group stage ==
=== Group stage table ===
Knockout stage Relegation playoff

Team	Matches				Score			Pts
Team	Pld	W	D	L	For	Against	Diff	Pts
Kilcormac–Killoughey	5	5	0	0	137	95	42	10
Carrig & Riverstown	5	3	1	1	110	94	16	7
Clodiagh Gaels	5	2	1	2	105	101	4	5
Lusmagh	5	2	0	3	99	112	-13	4
Birr	5	1	0	4	94	126	-32	2
Clara	5	1	0	5	101	118	-17	2

=== Group stage fixtures and results ===
19 July 2024 Round 1	Lusmagh	1-17 - 0-23	Clara	Moystown Grounds
		Report

19 July 2024 Round 1	Clodiagh Gaels	1-15 - 0-18	Carrig & Riverstown	Glenisk O'Connor Park
		Report

20 July 2024 Round 1	Birr	0-17 - 7-17	Kilcormac–Killoughey	St Rynagh's Park
		Report

3 August 2024 Round 2	Carrig & Riverstown	1-22 - 0-12	Lusmagh	Crinkle Grounds

3 August 2024 Round 2	Clara	1-16 - 1-21	Birr	Moystown Grounds

4 August 2024 Round 2	Kilcormac–Killoughey	0-19 - 0-16	Clodiagh Gaels	Glenisk O'Connor Park

16 August 2024 Round 3	Lusmagh	1-24 - 0-24	Clodiagh Gaels	Drumcullen Grounds

16 August 2024 Round 3	Carrig & Riverstown	0-26 - 1-15	Birr	Crinkle Grounds

17 August 2024 Round 3	Clara	1-19 - 1-26	Kilcormac–Killoughey	St Rynagh's Park

31 August 2024 Round 4	Kilcormac–Killoughey	2-20 - 1-16	Carrig & Riverstown	Crinkle Grounds

31 August 2024 Round 4	Clodiagh Gaels	1-20 - 2-11	Clara	The Mill Field

31 August 2024 Round 4	Birr	0-15 - 1-16	Lusmagh	St Rynagh's Park

7 September 2024 Round 5	Carrig & Riverstown	1-19 - 0-20	Clara	St Rynagh's Park

7 September 2024 Round 5	Lusmagh	0-21 - 0-25	Kilcormac–Killoughey	Grant Heating St Brendan's Park

7 September 2024 Round 5	Clodiagh Gaels	1-21 - 0-20	Birr	Kinnitty Grounds

== Knockout stage ==
=== Relegation playoff ===
20 September 2024 Playoff	Birr	1-13 - 1-17	Clara	Faithful Fields
	N Lyons 0-6 (5f), T Bolger 0-3, A Fitzgerald 1-1 penalty and 65’, R Fitzsimons, R Bergin and E Pilkinton 0-1 each.	Report	C Delaney 0-9 (8f), B Egan 1-2, S Griffith 0-2, M Dalton, C Egan, L Flynn and C O’Meara 0-1 each.

=== Semi-finals ===
21 September 2024 Semi-final	Clodiagh Gaels	2-15 - 0-15	Carrig & Riverstown	Glenisk O'Connor Park
	L Langton 0-8 (7f), C Brady 2-0, C Langton and R Dunne 0-2 each, B O'Brien, S Brady, P Lyons 0-1 each.	Report	L Hogan 0-7 (5f), C King and L Hoare (2f) 0-2 each, C Freeman, D Egan, A Coakley, M O'Brien 0-1 each.

22 September 2024 Semi-final	Kilcormac–Killoughey	0-29 - 2-18	Lusmagh	Grant Heating St Brendan's Park
	D Hand 0-7 (7f), L Kavanagh 0-6 (3f), P Geraghty 0-5, JK Kilmartin and C Quinn 0-3 each, S Guinan, T Geraghty, J, Gorman, D Currams, M Mulrooney, 0-1 each.	Report	P Kinsella 1-12 (9f) (goal from a penalty and 7f), R Quinlan 1-0, D Healy 0-3, G Lynch, A Kelly, E Kelly 0-1 each.

=== Final ===
5 October 2024 Final	Clodiagh Gaels	0-09 - 1-13	Kilcormac–Killoughey	Glenisk O'Connor Park
	L Langton 0-6 (6f), J Keenaghan, C Brady and C Langton 0-1 each.	Report	C Quinn 0-5 (4f and 1 '65'), C Kilmartin 1-0, S Guinan, P Geraghty and T Geraghty 0-2 each, M Mulrooney and L Kavanagh (f) 0-1 each.
