= 2017 Offaly Senior Hurling Championship =

Annual hurling competition season

- Dates: 15 April – 1 October 2017
- Teams: 12
- Sponsor: Molloy Environmental
- Champions: Kilcormac–Killoughey (4th title); Peter Healion (captain); Stephen Byrne (manager)
- Runners-up: St Rynagh's; Seán Dolan (captain); Fintan O'Connor (manager)

Tournament statistics
- Matches played: 37
- Top scorer(s): Joe Bergin (8-54)

The 2017 Offaly Senior Hurling Championship was the 120th staging of the Offaly Senior Hurling Championship since its establishment by the Offaly County Board in 1896. The championship ran from 15 April to 1 October 2017.

St Rynagh's entered the championship as the defending champions.

The final was played on 15 October 2023 at O'Connor Park in Tullamore, between Kilcormac–Killoughey and St Rynagh's, in what was their third meeting in the final overall and a first meeting in three years. Kilcormac–Killoughey won the match by 2-16 to 1-16 to claim their fourth championship title overall and a first title in three years.

== Group 1 ==
=== Group 1 table ===
Knockout stage Relegated

Team	Matches				Score			Pts
Team	Pld	W	D	L	For	Against	Diff	Pts
Kilcormac–Killoughey	5	5	0	0	121	71	50	10
Kinnitty	5	4	0	1	126	77	49	8
Coolderry	5	3	0	2	134	87	47	6
Birr	5	2	0	3	112	98	14	4
Lusmagh	5	1	0	4	78	118	-40	2
Shamrocks	5	0	0	5	65	182	-117	0

=== Group 1 results ===
15 April 2017 Round 1	Birr	1-15 - 2-19	Kinnitty	St Mary's Field
	E Cahill 1-12, B Murphy 0-1, C Mulrooney 0-1, R Hanniffy 0-1.		C Coughlan 0-10, E Callaghan 2-1, A Kealey 0-4, S Molloy 0-2, B Donnelly 0-1, J Hardiman 0-1.

16 April 2017 Round 1	Shamrocks	1-11 - 0-21	Lusmagh	St Rynagh's Park
	N Dunne 1-4, J O'Toole-Greene 0-7.		P Kinsella 0-10, E Quinlan 0-5, L Ryan 0-2, B Troy 0-1, E Kelly 0-1, D Kelly 0-1, C Kelly 0-1.

22 April 2017 Round 1	Kilcormac–Killoughey	1-15 - 0-15	Coolderry	St Rynagh's Park
	Ciaran Slevin 0-7, P Geraghty 1-1, C Kiely 0-3, T Geraghty 0-2, D Kilmartin 0-1, C Mahon 0-1.		K Connolly 0-7, B Carroll 0-3, W Malone 0-2, C Molloy 0-1, D King 0-1, M Corcoran 0-1.

30 April 2017 Round 2	Kinnitty	1-17 - 0-16	Coolderry	St Brendan's Park
	C Coughlan 0-10, E Callaghan 1-2, A Kealey 0-2, B Coughlan 0-1, W Molloy 0-1, J Hardiman 0-1.		K Connolly 0-9, S Corcoran 0-2, B Carroll 0-2, M Corcoran 0-1, W Malone 0-1, D King 0-1.

1 May 2017 Round 2	Birr	2-13 - 1-09	Lusmagh	Rath Grounds
	E Cahill 1-11, C Mulrooney 1-1, B Murphy 0-1.		E Kelly 1-1, C Kelly 0-3, P Kinsella 0-3, E Quinlan 0-1, S Gardiner 0-1.

1 May 2017 Round 2	Shamrocks	0-09 - 6-22	Kilcormac–Killoughey	O'Connor Park
	J O'Toole-Greene 0-4, B Kearney 0-2, N Dunne 0-2, J Molloy 0-1.		T Geraghty 3-4, D Currams 2-6, Ciaran Slevin 1-4, D Murray 0-4, J Gorman 0-2, P Geraghty 0-1, C Mahon 0-1.

14 July 2017 Round 3	Coolderry	2-28 - 0-12	Lusmagh	Crinkill Grounds
	B Carroll 1-12, D Parlon 0-6, K Connolly 0-5, 1-0 (og), W Malone 0-2, M Bergin 0-1, B Teehan 0-1, J Brady 0-1.		D Mahon 0-4, L Ryan 0-2, E Kelly 0-2, A Kelly 0-2, S Gardiner 0-1, D Kelly 0-1.

15 July 2017 Round 3	Kinnitty	0-14 - 0-15	Kilcormac–Killoughey	O'Connor Park
	C Coughlan 0-7, S Kinsella 0-4, S Molloy 0-1, E Callaghan 0-1, O Kealey 0-1.		C Kiely 0-4, C Mahon 0-3, D Currams 0-2, P Geraghty 0-2, J Gorman 0-1, Ciaran Slevin 0-1, Conor Slevin 0-1, T Geraghty 0-1.

15 July 2017 Round 3	Shamrocks	0-14 - 4-27	Birr	Rath Grounds
	W Mooney 0-6, B Kearney 0-4, D Minnock 0-2.		E Cahill 0-7, C Mulrooney 2-0, P Mullins 1-2, T Bolger 1-1, B Harding 0-4, D Quegan 0-3, D Hayden 0-3, E Nolan 0-2, B Murphy 0-2, A Whelahan 0-2, S Ryan 0-1.

23 July 2017 Round 4	Coolderry	2-16 - 1-18	Birr	St Mary's Field
	B Carroll 0-7, K Connolly 1-3, D Parlon 0-2, M Bergin 0-1, B Teehan 0-1, D Miller 0-1, M Corcoran 0-1.		T Bolger 1-3, B Murphy 0-4, C Mulrooney 0-3, E Nolan 0-2, C Taylor 0-2, D Hayden 0-1, B Harding 0-1, P Mullins 0-1, A Whelahan 0-1.

29 July 2017 Round 4	Kinnitty	5-23 - 0-13	Shamrocks	St Rynagh's Park

30 July 2017 Round 4	Kilcormac–Killoughey	1-19 - 1-15	Lusmagh	Rath Grounds
	Ciaran Slevin 0-8, C Kiely 0-4, G Healion 1-1, J Gorman 0-3, T Geraghty 0-2, P Healion 0-1.		S Gardiner 0-9, D Kelly 1-1, L Ryan 0-2, D Healy 0-1, D Morkan 0-1, G Lynch 0-1.

12 August 2017 Round 5	Kilcormac–Killoughey	0-26 - 0-16	Birr	O'Connor Park
	Ciaran Slevin 0-8, C Kiely 0-5, D Currams 0-4, J Gorman 0-4, S Leonard 0-3, Conor Mahon 0-1, Cathal Mahon 0-1.		E Cahill 0-7, T Bolger 0-3, S Ryan 0-2, B Harding 0-1, C Shortt 0-1, C Taylor 0-1, B Murphy 0-1.

12 August 2017 Round 5	Kinnitty	3-20 - 1-12	Lusmagh	Rath Grounds
	C Coughlan 0-9, S Molloy 2-1, A Kealey 1-1, L Bergin 0-2, S Kinsella 0-2, C Leonard 0-1, B Donnelly 0-1, P Delaney 0-1, O Kealey 0-1, J Hardiman 0-1.		E Kelly 1-1, B Troy 0-3, A Kelly 0-3, D Mahon 0-2, D Kelly 0-1, L Ryan 0-1, S Gardiner 0-1.

12 August 2017 Round 5	Coolderry	6-29 - 0-16	Shamrocks	Páirc na Carraige & Baile Uí Lachnáin
	B Carroll 1-11, K Connolly 0-7, M Corcoran 2-0, C Maloney 1-2, D Parlon 0-4, J Bardy 1-1, B Kelly 1-0, M Bergin 0-1, B Teehan 0-1, D Miller 0-1, T Corcoran 0-1.		B Kearney 0-7, C Moran 0-3, D Meacle 0-2, S O'Toole-Greene 0-1, A Foster 0-1, D Minnock 0-1, C O'Brien 0-1.

== Group 2 ==
=== Group 2 table ===
Knockout stage Relegated

Team	Matches				Score			Pts
Team	Pld	W	D	L	For	Against	Diff	Pts
St Rynagh's	5	4	0	1	126	71	55	8
Seir Kieran	5	3	1	1	134	86	48	7
Belmont	5	3	1	1	132	93	39	7
Shinrone	5	3	0	2	134	99	35	6
Tullamore	5	1	0	4	83	138	-55	2
Clodiagh Gaels	5	0	0	5	70	192	-122	0

=== Group 2 results ===
16 April 2017 Round 1	Tullamore	4-16 - 0-12	Clodiagh Gaels	O'Connor Park
	S Dooley 3-9, N McCabe 1-1, J Houlihan 0-2, D Hogan 0-2, R Hughes 0-1, P Farrelly 0-1.		D Dunne 0-6, L Langton 0-4, T Brady 0-1, J Keenaghan 0-1.

16 April 2017 Round 1	Seir Kieran	3-14 - 2-15	Shinrone	St Brendan's Park
	J Bergin 1-4, J Mulrooney 0-6, B Connors 1-1, A Hynes 1-0, D Mooney 0-1, T Carroll 0-1, K Dunne 0-1.		S Cleary 1-3, C Doughan 1-3, D Morkan 0-5, D Crean 0-1, A Cleary 0-1, C Cleary 0-1, D Cleary 0-1.

16 April 2017 Round 1	St Rynagh's	3-10 - 0-13	Belmont	St Brendan's Park
	S Quirke 1-5, S Dolan 1-1, M Maloney 1-0, G Scales 0-2, P Camon 0-1, R Hughes 0-1.		O Kelly 0-6, D Egan 0-5, A Egan 0-1, M Egan 0-1.

29 April 2017 Round 2	Belmont	1-16 - 0-19	Seir Kieran	Lusmagh Grounds
	D Egan 0-8, O Kelly 0-5, J Nally 1-0, D Cox 0-1, J Maher 0-1, D Kelly 0-1.		J Bergin 0-11, T Carroll 0-5, B Connors 0-1, J Mulrooney 0-1, D Mooney 0-1.

29 April 2017 Round 2	Shinrone	0-28 - 0-13	Tullamore	Páirc Naomh Cormac
	D Morkan 0-13, C Doughan 0-4, D Cleary 0-4, C Cleary 0-3, S Cleary 0-2, J Cleary 0-1, B Loughnane 0-1.		S Dooley 0-7, S Keogh 0-3, A Leavey 0-1, G Treacy 0-1, N Mannion 0-1.

1 May 2017 Round 2	Clodiagh Gaels	0-12 - 4-29	St Rynagh's	Páirc Naomh Cormac
	L Langton 0-4, D Dunne 0-3, P Horan 0-1, D Buckley 0-1, M Egan 0-1, C Langton 0-1, J Keenaghan 0-1.		S Quirke 1-11, G Scales 1-2, M Maloney 1-1, A Treacy 0-4, J O'Connor 0-3, T Dunne 1-0 (og), B Conneely 0-2, G Conneely 0-2, P Quirke 0-2, P Camon 0-1, D Maloney 0-1.

14 July 2017 Round 3	Belmont	3-19 - 2-19	Shinrone	St Finian's Park
	D Egan 1-5, O Kelly 1-4, L Fox 1-1, C Egan 0-3, D Kelly 0-3, D Cox 0-1, S Nally 0-1, J Clancy 0-1.		D Morkan 0-6, S Cleary 1-2, D Morkan 1-1, D Cleary 0-4, C Cleary 0-2, D Doughan 0-1, J Cleary 0-1, D Cleary 0-1, J Sampson 0-1.

16 July 2017 Round 3	Seir Kieran	7-24 - 1-15	Clodiagh Gaels	Moystown Grounds
	J Bergin 2-9, J Mulrooney 3-4, B Connors 2-0, A Hynes 0-6, K Dunne 0-3, E Murphy 0-1, J Scully 0-1.		L Langton 0-6, D Dunne 0-4, C Langton 1-0, J Keenaghan 0-2, M Egan 0-1, N Cunningham 0-1, N Casey 0-1.

16 July 2017 Round 3	St Rynagh's	3-21 - 0-12	Tullamore	Moystown Grounds
	S Quirke 0-11, S Dolan 2-2, S Kenny 1-0, G Scales 0-2, N Wynne 0-1, A Treacy 0-1, G Conneely 0-1, M Maloney 0-1, P Quirke 0-1, D Tierney 0-1.		S Kelly 0-6, G Treacy 0-2, J Houlihan 0-2, A Leavey 0-1, N Bracken 0-1.

30 July 2017 Round 4	St Rynagh's	0-16 - 1-10	Seir Kieran	Coolderry Grounds
	S Quirke 0-5, P Quirke 0-4, S Dolan 0-2, D Tierney 0-1, G Conneely 0-1, P Camon 0-1, A Treacy 0-1, M Maloney 0-1.		J Bergin 1-2, A Hynes 0-4, J Mulrooney 0-3, B Kealey 0-1.

30 July 2017 Round 4	Shinrone	5-24 - 0-15	Clodiagh Gaels	St Brendan's Park
	J Sampson 4-4, D Cleary 1-8, S Cleary 0-3, C Cleary 0-3, D Cleary 0-2, D Doughan 0-2, E Carroll 0-1, C Doughan 0-1.		L Langton 0-7, D Dunne 0-7, C Langton 0-1.

30 July 2017 Round 4	Belmont	5-19 - 2-11	Tullamore	St Brendan's Park
	L Fox 2-5, O Kelly 2-3, D Egan 0-4, D Kelly 1-0, D Nally 0-3, D Cox 0-2, S Nally 0-1, K Nugent 0-1.		S Dooley 1-6, N McCabe 1-0, J Houlihan 0-2, C Martin 0-2, J Dooley 0-1.

12 August 2017 Round 5	St Rynagh's	1-17 - 1-18	Shinrone	Crinkill Grounds
	D Tierney 1-2, A Treacy 0-4, S Dolan 0-3, A Kenny 0-3, B Conneely 0-2, G Kelly 0-1, P Quirke 0-1, C Hernon 0-1.		D Morkan 0-6, J Sampson 1-0, S Cleary 0-3, D Doughan 0-3, D Cleary 0-2, E Carroll 0-2, C Cleary 0-2.

12 August 2017 Round 5	Seir Kieran	5-19 - 1-09	Tullamore	Clara Grounds
	J Bergin 2-9, A Hynes 1-3, B Kealy 1-0, J Scully 1-0, J Mulrooney 0-2, K Dunne 0-2, D Mooney 0-1, K Murray 0-1, B Bergin 0-1.		S Kelly 1-7, J Dooley 0-1, C Hensey 0-1.

12 August 2017 Round 5	Belmont	3-29 - 0-13	Clodiagh Gaels	Rath Grounds
	D Egan 0-11, L Fox 1-7, J Maher 1-2, C Egan 1-1, D Cox 0-3, D Nally 0-2, D Kelly 0-1, O Kelly 0-1, J Clancy 0-1.		D Dunne 0-6, L Langton 0-4, C Langton 0-2, M Egan 0-1.

== Knockout stage ==
=== Quarter-finals ===
26 August 2017 Quarter-final	Coolderry	3-15 - 1-22	Seir Kieran	St Brendan's Park
	B Carroll 1-7, K Connolly 1-3, J Brady 1-0, B Teehan 0-2, S Corcoran 0-1, D King 0-1, D Miller 0-1.		J Bergin 0-13, B Kealey 1-1, J Mulrooney 0-3, T Carroll 0-2, K Dunne 0-2, A Hynes 0-1.

26 August 2017 Quarter-final	St Rynagh's	0-19 - 0-18	Birr	St Brendan's Park
	S Quirke 0-6, S Wynne 0-3, P Camon 0-3, A Treacy 0-2, D Maloney 0-1, D Shortt 0-1, N Wynne 0-1, P Quirke 0-1, G Scales 0-1.		E Cahill 0-7, C Mulrooney 0-3, S Ryan 0-2, E Nolan 0-2, B Murphy 0-2, D Hayden 0-1, S Lonergan 0-1.

27 August 2017 Quarter-final	Kilcormac–Killoughey	0-25 - 1-14	Shinrone	Bord na Móna O'Connor Park
	C Kiely 0-5, Ciaran Slevin 0-5, D Currams 0-4, J Gorman 0-4, S Leonard 0-3, C Mahon 0-2, P Geraghty 0-2.		D Morkan 0-6, D Cleary 1-0, J Sampson 0-2, C Cleary 0-2, E Carroll 0-1, D Morkan 0-1, S Cleary 0-1, D Doughan 0-1.

27 August 2017 Quarter-final	Belmont	3-18 - 1-21	Kinnitty	Bord na Móna O'Connor Park
	O Kelly 3-1, L Fox 0-5, J Maher 0-4, D Kelly 0-2, C Egan 0-2, D Egan 0-1, D Cox 0-1, M Egan 0-1, D Nally 0-1.		C Coughlan 0-9, O Kealey 0-6, S Kinsella 1-2, S Molloy 0-2, A Kealey 0-1, J Molloy 0-1.

=== Semi-finals ===
10 September 2017 Semi-final	St Rynagh's	0-14 - 1-10	Seir Kieran	Bord na Móna O'Connor Park
	S Quirke 0-8, P Quirke 0-2, G Kelly 0-2, P Camon 0-1, R Hughes 0-1.		J Bergin 1-6, A Hynes 0-3, M Gilligan 0-1.

10 September 2017 Semi-final	Belmont	0-11 - 0-12	Kilcormac–Killoughey	Bord na Móna O'Connor Park
	L Fox 0-3, D Egan 0-3, J Maher 0-2, D Kelly 0-2, O Kelly 0-1.		C Kiely 0-3, J Gorman 0-2, Ciaran Slevin 0-2, T Geraghty 0-2, S Leonard 0-1, P Geraghty 0-1, C Mahon 0-1.

=== Final ===
1 October 2017 Final	Kilcormac–Killoughey	2-16 - 1-16	St Rynagh's	Bord na Móna O'Connor Park
	Ciaran Slevin 1-7 (0-5fs), T Geraghty 1-1, D Currams 0-3, E Grogan, C Kiely (f), J Gorman, P Healion, S Leonard 0-1 each.		S Quirke 0-7 (6fs); A Treacy 0-4 (3fs, 1 '65'), J O'Connor 1-0, S Dolan 0-3, G Scales, R Hughes 0-1 each.	Referee: R Fitzsimons (Birr)
