= 2021 Offaly Senior B Hurling Championship =

Annual hurling competition season

- Dates: 28 August - 20 November 2021
- Teams: 6
- Sponsor: Molloy Environmental
- Champions: Clodiagh Gaels (1st title); Shane Dolan (captain); Paul Murphy (manager)
- Runners-up: Tullamore; Kevin Martin (manager)
- Relegated: Shinrone

Tournament statistics
- Matches played: 19

The 2021 Offaly Senior B Hurling Championship was the fourth staging of the Offaly Senior B Hurling Championship since its establishment by the Offaly County Board. The group stage fixtures were confirmed on 27 May 2021. The championship ran from 28 August to 20 November 2021.

The final was played on 20 November 2021 at St Brendan's Park in Birr, between Clodiagh Gaels and Tullamore, in what was their first ever meeting in the final. Clodiagh Gaels won the match by 2–10 to 1–12 to claim their first ever championship title.

== Team changes ==
=== To Championship ===
Promoted from the Offaly Intermediate Hurling Championship

- Shinrone

=== From Championship ===
Promoted to the Offaly Senior Hurling Championship

- Drumcullen
- Kinnitty

Relegated to the Offaly Intermediate Hurling Championship

- Carrig-Riverstown

== Knockout stage ==
=== Relegation playoff ===
30 October 2021 Relegation playoff	Kilcormac-Killoughey	1-19 - 0-09	Shinrone

=== Semi-finals ===
6 November 2021 Semi-final	Clodiagh Gaels	0-23 - 0-16	Lusmagh	Kilcormac Grounds
	D Dunne 0-10, L Langton 0-4, S Dolan 0-3, C Langton 0-2, D Buckley 0-1, C Curran 0-1, R Dunne 0-1, J Keenaghan 0-1.		P Kinsella 0-11, E Kelly 0-2, E Quinlan 0-1, A Kelly 0-1, D Kelly 0-1.

7 November 2021 Semi-final	Tullamore	2-15 - 0-14	Clara	Killegh Grounds
	S Dooley 0-10, M Fox 1-1, D Fox 1-1, J Houlihan 0-2, J Dooley 0-1.		C Delaney 0-5, E Cullen 0-3, B Cushen 0-2, G Guilfoyle 0-1, C Egan 0-1, J Fleming 0-1, C O'Meara 0-1.

=== Final ===
20 November 2021 Final	Clodiagh Gaels	2-10 - 1-12	Tullamore	St Brendan's Park
	D Dunne 1-5, D Buckley 1-0, J Keenaghan 0-2, C Langton 0-2, L Langton 0-1.		S Dooley 0-7, G Mann 1-0, J Houlihan 0-2, D Egan 0-1, J Dooley 0-1, D Fox 0-1.
