= 2023 Offaly Senior Hurling Championship =

Annual hurling competition season

- Dates: 7 July – 15 October 2023
- Teams: 10
- Sponsor: Molloy Environmental
- Champions: Kilcormac–Killoughey (5th title); Conor Slevin (captain); Shane Hand (manager)
- Runners-up: Shinrone; Declan Cleary (captain); Trevor Fletcher (manager)
- Relegated: Seir Kieran

Tournament statistics
- Matches played: 26
- Goals scored: 67 (2.58 per match)
- Points scored: 915 (35.19 per match)
- Top scorer(s): Brian Duignan (1-38)

The 2023 Offaly Senior Hurling Championship was the 126th staging of the Offaly Senior Hurling Championship since its establishment by the Offaly County Board in 1896. The draw for the group stage placings was made on 20 March 2023. The championship ran from 7 July to 15 October 2023.

Shinrone entered the championship as the defending champions.

The final was played on 15 October 2023 at Grant Heating St Brendan's Park in Birr, between Kilcormac–Killoughey and Shinrone, in what was their second consecutive meeting in the final. Kilcormac–Killoughey won the match by 3–26 to 3–08 to claim their fifth championship title overall and a first title in six years.

Ballinamere's Brian Duignan was the championship's top scorer with 1-38.

== Team changes ==
=== To championship ===
Promoted from the Offaly Senior B Hurling Championship

- Tullamore

=== From championship ===
Relegated to the Offaly Senior B Hurling Championship

- Clodiagh Gaels

== Group 1 ==
=== Group 1 table ===
Semi-finalists Quarter-finalists Relegation playoff

Team	Matches				Score			Pts
Team	Pld	W	D	L	For	Against	Diff	Pts
Kilcormac–Killoughey	4	4	0	0	103	70	33	8
St Rynagh's	4	3	0	1	95	66	29	6
Birr	4	2	0	2	84	77	13	4
Tullamore	4	1	0	3	76	108	-33	2
Kinnitty	4	0	0	4	57	94	-37	0

=== Group 1 results ===
7 July 2023 Round 1	Tullamore	0-14 - 2-21	St Rynagh's	Glenisk O'Connor Park
	M Fox 0-5, J Dooley 0-4, D Fox 0-3, J Houlihan 0-2.		A Treacy 1-6, L O'Connor 1-3, E Woods 0-4, M Maloney 0-2, A Rigney 0-2, B Rigney 0-1, G Conneely 0-1, J O'Connor 0-1, M McLoughlin 0-1.

7 July 2023 Round 1	Kinnitty	1-08 - 1-15	Birr	Crinkle Grounds
	J Dempsey 1-6, B Donnelly 0-1, J Hardiman 0-1.		L Quinn 0-7, S Ryan 1-1, M Watkins 0-2, L Nolan 0-1, C Mulrooney 0-1, B Watkins 0-1, E Nolan 0-1, J Ryan 0-1.

20 July 2023 Round 2	Kilcormac–Killoughey	1-20 - 0-15	Kinnitty	Glenisk O'Connor Park
	A Screeney 0-7 (5f), C Spain 0-4, Cathal Kiely 0-3 (1f), C Mitchell 1-0, E Grogan and C Mahon 0-2 each, D Kilmartin and L Kavanagh 0-1 each.		J Dempsey 0-7 (7f), J Hardiman 0-3 (1f), D Flanagan, C Hardiman, S Kinsella, E Callaghan, C Hardiman 0-1 each.

21 July 2023 Round 2	Birr	3-16 - 1-14	Tullamore	St Rynagh's Park
	L Quinn (1-6, 1-1 sideline cuts, 0-5 frees), C Mulrooney (1-3, 0-1 free), N Lyons (1-0), E Nolan, B Murphy (0-2 each), M Watkins, S Ryan, L Nolan (0-1 each).		S Dooley (0-10, 0-9 frees, 0-1 '65'), M Fox (1-2), J Dooley, J Houlihan (0-1 each).

4 August 2023 Round 3	St Rynagh's	2-19 - 0-21	Birr	Drumcullen Grounds
	E Woods 1-8 (5f), A Treacy 0-5 (3f), L O'Connor 1-0, J Flannery 0-3, G Conneely 0-2 each, B Conneely 0-1.		L Quinn 0-10 (9f), E Nolan 0-4, L Nolan and C Mulrooney 0-2 each, B Murphy, M Watkins, J Ryan 0-1 each.

6 August 2023 Round 3	Tullamore	0-20 - 2-30	Kilcormac–Killoughey	Tubber Grounds
	S Dooley 0-11 (9f), N Furlong and J Houlihan 0-2 each, C Martin, D Egan, C Egan, C Martin and D Fox 0-1 each.		A Screeney 1-7 (6f), C Mahon 0-6, C Mitchell 0-4, J Screeney and Cathal Kiely 0-3 each, C Spain 1-0, T Geraghty 0-2, J Quinn, D Kilmartin, J Gorman, L Kavanagh and Cillian Kiely 0-1 each.

19 August 2023 Round 4	Kilcormac–Killoughey	1-17 - 0-15	St Rynagh's	Grant Heating St Brendan's Park
	A Screeney 0-6 (5f), C Mitchell 0-3, J Screeney 1-0, Cillian Kiely, Cathal Kiely, C Mahon and J Gorman 0-2 each.		E Woods 0-6 (5f), J O'Connor 0-3, M Maloney, J Flannery, G Conneely, A Treacy, S Rigney and A Kenny 0-1 each.

20 August 2023 Round 4	Kinnitty	2-14 - 3-16	Tullamore	Clareen Grounds
	C Coughlan (0-8, 0-6 frees, 0-1 '65'), J Dempsey (1-1, 0-1 free), J Hardiman (0-3), P Delaney (1-0), A Kealey and D Flanagan (0-1 each).		S Dooley (1-9, 0-9 frees), M Fox (1-2), Cormac Martin (1-1), C Egan, J Houlihan, A Leavy, Cillian Martin (0-1 each).

3 September 2023 Round 5	St Rynagh's	3-19 - 0-11	Kinnitty	Glenisk O'Connor Park
	E Woods 1-7 (6f), A Treacy 1-2 (1f), L O'Connor 1-1, G Conneely and S Rigney 0-3 each, M Maloney, A Kenny and P Quirke 0-1 each.		C Coughlan 0-5 (2f), C Robinson and J Dempsey (2f) 0-2 each, P Delaney and J Hardiman 0-1 each.

3 September 2023 Round 5	Birr	2-14 - 1-21	Kilcormac–Killoughey	Glenisk O'Connor Park
	E Nolan 0-6, C Mulrooney and M Watkins 1-2 each, L Quinn 0-4 (3f and 1 '65').		A Screeney 0-9 (7f), C Mahon 1-1, J Gorman 0-3, C Mitchell 0-2, Cillian Kiely, Cathal Kiely, J Screeney, C Spain, T Geraghty and S Guinan 0-1 each.

== Group 2 ==
=== Group 2 table ===
Semi-finalists Quarter-finalists Relegation playoff

Team	Matches				Score			Pts
Team	Pld	W	D	L	For	Against	Diff	Pts
Ballinamere	4	4	0	0	103	76	27	8
Shinrone	4	3	0	1	81	77	4	6
Coolderry	4	2	0	2	89	75	41	4
Belmont	4	1	0	3	75	94	-19	2
Seir Kieran	4	0	0	4	72	98	-26	0

=== Group 2 results ===
7 July 2023 Round 1	Seir Kieran	1-16 - 1-18	Belmont	Drumcullen Grounds
	T Dooley 0-4 (2 frees), A Hynes 0-4 (frees), K Dunne 0-3, D Guinan 1-0, L Carey and J Mulrooney 0-2 each, J Bergin 0-1.		M Egan 0-7 (frees), P Clancy 0-4 (2 frees), C Flynn 1-0, L Fox 0-2, D Egan, J Clancy, C Dunican, R McEvoy and J Nally 0-1 each.

7 July 2023 Round 1	Coolderry	0-15 - 0-16	Shinrone	Grant Heating St Brendan's Park
	D Miller 0-7, S Corcoran 0-2, S Ryan 0-2, K Connolly 0-2, W Malone 0-1, B Carroll 0-1.		D Morkan 0-4, A Cleary 0-3, J Sampson 0-1, E Cleary 0-1, K Sampson 0-1, D Maher 0-1, D Cleary 0-1, L Watkins 0-1, S Cleary 0-1, P Cleary 0-1, DJ McLoughlin 0-1.

21 July 2023 Round 2	Ballinamere	1-22 - 2-16	Coolderry	Grant Heating St Brendan's Park
	B Duignan 0-9 (6f), S Bourke, D Bourke and D Ravenhill (2f) 0-3 each, K McDermott 1-0, J Maher and A Maher 0-2 each.		B Carroll 2-2 (one goal from a penalty), D Miller 0-6 (6f), C Burke 0-4, K Connolly 0-2, D King, C Molloy 0-1 each.

22 July 2023 Round 2	Shinrone	1-17 - 2-13	Seir Kieran	Grant Heating St Brendan's Park
	D Morkan 0-7 (7f), P Cleary 0-4, S Cleary 1-1, L Watkins 0-2, K Sampson, D Cleary, J Sampson 0-1 each.		A Hynes 1-3 (1-3f), J Mulrooney 0-5 (1f), L Carey 1-1, K Dunne, P Gilligan, T Dooley and D Guinan 0-2 each.

5 August 2023 Round 3	Belmont	0-20 - 3-16	Shinrone	Grant Heating St Brendan's Park
	D Nally (0-8, all frees), P Clancy (0-5), D Egan, C Flynn (0-2 each), J Clancy, S Nally, R McEvoy (0-1 each).		D Morkan (0-5, 0-3 frees, 0-1 '65'), P Cleary (1-1), K Sampson, J Liffey (1-0 each), E Cleary (frees), L Watkins, C Doughan (0-2 each), S Cleary, DJ McLoughlin, A Cleary, D Doughan (0-1 each).

5 August 2023 Round 3	Seir Kieran	0-19 - 2-26	Ballinamere	Faithful Fields
	T Dooley 0-7 (5f), A Hynes 0-6 (2f), J Mulrooney (1f), K Dunne and L Carey 0-2 each.		B Duignan 0-10 (5f), M O'Brien 1-4, D Ravenhill 0-6 (2 '65s'), A Maher 0-3, R Cleary 1-0, D Bourke, J Maher and K McDermott 0-1 each.

19 August 2023 Round 4	Coolderry	1-22 - 1-12	Seir Kieran	Grant Heating St Brendan's Park
	K Connolly (1-5), D Miller (0-6, 0-4 frees), D King, B Carroll (0-2), E Parlon (0-2, 0-1 sideline cut), S Corcoran (0-2, frees), E Burke, E Ryan, B Burke (0-1 each).		J Bergin (1-1), A Hynes (0-4, 0-3 frees), J Mulrooney (0-3), T Dooley (0-2, frees), J Coughlan, J Connors (free) (0-1 each).

20 August 2023 Round 4	Ballinamere	1-20 - 1-12	Belmont	Glenisk O'Connor Park
	B Duignan 1-6 (4f), A Maher 0-4, D Ravenhill 0-3 (1f), S Bourke and D Bourke 0-2 each, R Cleary, J Murphy and D Wyer 0-1 each.		M Egan (3f and 1 '65') and P Clancy (2f) 0-4 each, J Nally 1-1, C Flynn 0-2, D Egan 0-1.

2 September 2023 Round 5	Shinrone	2-14 - 0-23	Ballinamere	Grant Heating St Brendan's Park
	J Sampson 1-1, P Cleary 1-0, C Doughan and D Morkan (3f) 0-3 each, L Watkins 0-2, K Sampson, D Maher, D Cleary, S Cleary 0-1 each.		B Duignan 0-13 (5 f and 2 '65s), D Bourke 0-3, S Bourke and D Ravenhill 0-2 each, A Maher, K McDermott and D Wyer 0-1 each.

2 September 2023 Round 5	Belmont	2-13 - 1-24	Coolderry	Grant Heating St Brendan's Park
	D Nally 1-7 (1-6, f), J Nally 1-0, L Fox 0-2 (1f), M Egan, P Taaffe, P Clancy, R McEvoy 0-1 each.		D Miller 0-6 (3f and 1 '65'), B Carroll 1-1, K Connolly and W Malone 0-4 each, S Corcoran 0-3 (3f), D King and G McCormack 0-2 each, C Molloy, E Parlon 0-1 each.

== Knockout stage ==
=== Relegation playoff ===
16 September 2023 Playoff	Kinnitty	2-19 - 2-16	Seir Kieran	Grant Heating St Brendan's Park
	C Coughlan 0-12 (11frees); C Hardiman 2-1; J Dempsey and O Kealey 0-2; D Flanagan and J Hardiman 0-1 each .	Report	J Bergin 1-6 (5frees); J Mulrooney 0-8 (4frees); D Guinan 1-0; A Hynes and P Gilligan 0-1 each.	Referee: J Deehan (Clara)

=== Quarter-finals ===
16 September 2023 Quarter-final	St Rynagh's	3-13 - 1-16	Coolderry	Glenisk O'Connor Park
	E Woods 1-4 (3 '65'and 1f), A Kenny 2-1, S Rigney, J O'Connor and M Maloney 0-2 each, J Flannery and L O'Connor 0-1.	Report	D Miller 0-7 (5f), A Connolly 1-1, K Connolly 0-3, G McCormack 0-2, S Corcoran (f) and B Carroll 0-1 each.	Referee: S Guinan (Drumcullen)

17 September 2023 Quarter-final	Birr	3-22 - 1-30 (aet)	Shinrone	Glenisk O'Connor Park
	E Cahill 0-13 (9f), M Watkins 2-2, L Quinn 0-3, E Nolan 1-0, J Ryan 0-2, L Nolan and S Ryan 0-1 each.	Report	D Morkan 0-8 (7f), A Cleary 0-5, K Samspon and P Cleary 0-4 each, D Cleary, S Cleary, J Samspon 0-2 each, D Maher (f), L Watkins and D Doughan 0-1 each.	Referee: A Kinahan (Clodiagh Gaels)

=== Semi-finals ===
30 September 2023 Semi-final	Ballinamere	0-16 - 1-19	Shinrone	Glenisk O'Connor Park
	B Duignan 0-10 (7f), D Bourke and J Murphy 0-2 each, D Ravenhill (f) and J Maher 0-1 each.	Report	D Morkan 0-4 (3f), K Sampson 1-3, D Cleary 0-3, P Cleary 0-2, D Landy, C Doughan, D Maher, L Watkins, A Cleary, S Cleary, J Sampson 0-1 each.	Referee: A Kinahan (Clodiagh Gaels)

1 October 2023 Semi-final	Kilcormac–Killoughey	0-22 - 1-14	St Rynagh's	Glenisk O'Connor Park
	A Screeney 0-8 (6f and 1 '65'), Cillian Kiely (2f) and C Mitchell 0-5 each, B Kavanagh, Cathal Kiely, C Mahon and J Gorman 0-1 each.	Report	E Woods 0-7 (6f), J O'Connor 1-0, A Treacy 0-3 (2f), L O'Connor 0-2, M Maloney and S Quirke 0-1 each.	Referee: B Gavin (Clara)

=== Final ===
15 October 2023 Final	Shinrone	3-08 - 3-26	Kilcormac–Killoughey	Grant Heating St Brendan's Park
	D Maher (2-1, 2-1f), D Morkan (0-3, 3f), J Sampson (1-0), D Cleary (0-2), K Sampson, L Watkins (0-1 each).	Report	C Mitchell (1-4), A Screeney (0-7, 4f, 1 65), C Mahon (0-6), J Screeney (0-3), J Gorman (1-0), Cathal Kiely (1-1), Cillian Kiely (0-2, 2f), D Kilmartin, B Kavanagh, T Geraghty (0-1 each).	Referee: B Gavin (Clara)

== Championship statistics ==
=== Top scorers ===
Overall

Rank	Player	Club	Tally	Total	Matches	Average
1	Brian Duignan	Ballinamere	1-48	51	5	10.20
2	Adam Screeney	Kilcormac-Killoughey	1-44	47	6	7.83
3	Eoin Woods	St Rynagh's	3-36	45	6	7.50
4	Donal Morkan	Shinrone	0-34	34	7	4.85
5	Shane Dooley	Tullamore	1-30	33	4	8.25
5	Lochlainn Quinn	Birr	1-30	33	5	6.60
7	Daniel Miller	Coolderry	0-32	32	5	6.40
8	Colm Coughlan	Kinnitty	0-25	25	5	5.00
9	James Dempsey	Kinnitty	2-18	24	5	4.80
9	Charlie Mitchell	Kilcormac-Killoughey	2-18	24	6	4.00

In a single game

Rank	Player	Club	Tally	Total	Opposition
1	Eoghan Cahill	Birr	0-13	13	Shinrone
1	Brian Duignan	Ballinamere	0-13	13	Shinrone
3	Shane Dooley	Tullamore	1-09	12	Kinnitty
3	Colm Coughlan	Kinnitty	0-12	12	Seir Kieran
5	Eoin Woods	St Rynagh's	1-08	11	Birr
5	Shane Dooley	Tullamore	0-11	11	Kilcormac-Killoughey
7	Adam Screeney	Kilcormac-Killoughey	1-07	10	Tullamore
7	Eoin Woods	St Rynagh's	1-07	10	Kinnitty
7	David Nally	Belmont	1-07	10	Coolderry
7	Lochlainn Quinn	Birr	0-10	10	St Rynagh's
7	Shane Dooley	Tullamore	0-10	10	Birr
7	Brian Duignan	Ballinamere	0-10	10	Seir Kieran
7	Brian Duignan	Ballinamere	0-10	10	Shinrone
