= 2022 Offaly Senior B Hurling Championship =

Annual hurling competition season

- Dates: 25 June - 18 September 2022
- Teams: 6
- Sponsor: Molloy Environmental
- Champions: Tullamore (1st title); Ger Crowe (captain)
- Runners-up: Clara; John Ledwith (captain)
- Relegated: Drumcullen

Tournament statistics
- Matches played: 19

The 2022 Offaly Senior B Hurling Championship was the fifth staging of the Offaly Senior B Hurling Championship since its establishment by the Offaly County Board in 2018. The group stage placings were confirmed on 25 April 2022. The championship ran from 25 June to 18 September 2022.

The final was played on 18 September 2022 at Glenisk O'Connor Park in Tullamore, between Tullamore and Clara, in what was their first ever meeting in the final. Tullamore won the match by 3–09 to 0–09 to claim their first ever championship title.

== Team changes ==
=== To Championship ===
Relegated from the Offaly Senior Hurling Championship

- Drumcullen

Promoted from the Offaly Intermediate Hurling Championship

- Birr

=== From Championship ===
Promoted to the Offaly Senior Hurling Championship

- Clodiagh Gaels

Relegated to the Offaly Intermediate Hurling Championship

- Shinrone

== Group stage ==
=== Group stage table ===
Knockout stage Relegation playoff

Team	Matches				Score			Pts
Team	Pld	W	D	L	For	Against	Diff	Pts
Kilcormac–Killoughey	5	3	0	2	111	100	11	6
Clara	5	3	0	2	97	97	0	6
Birr	5	3	0	2	97	97	0	6
Tullamore	5	2	1	2	102	97	5	5
Drumcullen	5	2	1	2	86	83	3	5
Lusmagh	5	1	0	4	92	111	-19	2

== Knockout stage ==
=== Relegation playoff ===
4 September 2022 Relegation playoff	Lusmagh	1-19 - 0-18	Drumcullen	St Brendan's Park

=== Semi-finals ===
3 September 2022 Semi-final	Clara	0-18 - 1-09	Birr	Glenisk O'Connor Park
	C O'Meara 0-5, J Fleming 0-5, E Cullen 0-2, C Delaney 0-2, C Doyle 0-1, A Gavin 0-1, B Buckley 0-1, L Hiney 0-1.		D Murphy 1-0, M Mulrooney 0-3, S Lonergan 0-2, C Kirwan 0-2, T Bolger 0-1, A Watkins 0-1.

3 September 2022 Semi-final	Tullamore	3-27 - 1-31 (aet)	Kilcormac-Killoughey	St Rynagh's Park
	S Dooley 1-10 (8f and a ‘65), S Kelly 1-4, M Fox 1-3, D Fox 0-3, C Martin 0-2, C Egan, G Treacy, G Mann, C Woodlock and J Houlihan 0-1 each.	Report	D Hand 1-10 (6f and a ‘65), J Gorman 0-7, S Guinan 0-3, C Lowry, D Murray, E Gleeson and S Leonard 0-2 each, C Donoghue, C Quinn, and K Leonard 0-1 each.

=== Final ===
18 September 2022 Final	Tullamore	3-09 - 0-09	Clara	Glenisk O'Connor Park
	S Dooley 1-6, S Kelly 1-0, C Egan 1-0, M Fox 0-2, G Mann 0-1.		J Fleming 0-4, L Hiney 0-1, A Gavin 0-1, C Egan 0-1, P Smith 0-1, S Weir 0-1.	Referee: D Cooke
