= 2025 Offaly Senior B Hurling Championship =

Annual hurling competition season

- Dates: 12 July - 5 October 2025
- Teams: 6
- Sponsor: Molloy Environmental Systems
- Champions: Lusmagh (1st title); Graham Lynch (captain)
- Runners-up: Carrig & Riverstown
- Relegated: Coolderry

Tournament statistics
- Matches played: 19
- Goals scored: 46 (2.42 per match)
- Points scored: 666 (35.05 per match)

The 2025 Offaly Senior B Hurling Championship was the eighth staging of the Offaly Senior B Hurling Championship since its establishment by the Offaly County Board in 2018. The draw for the group stage placings was made on 13 February 2025. The championship ran from 12 July to 5 October 2025.

Kilcormac–Killoughey entered the championship as the defending champions, however, they were beaten by Lusmagh in the semi-finals.

The final was played on 5 October 2025 at Grant Heating St Brendan's Park in Birr, between Lusmagh and Carrig & Riverstown, in what was their first ever meeting in the final. Lusmagh won the match by 1–19 to 0–19 to claim their first ever championship title.

== Team changes ==
=== To Championship ===
Promoted from the Offaly Intermediate Hurling Championship

- Coolderry

=== From Championship ===
Relegated to the Offaly Intermediate Hurling Championship

- Birr

== Group stage ==
=== Group stage table ===
Knockout stage Relegation playoff

Team	Matches				Score			Pts
Team	Pld	W	D	L	For	Against	Diff	Pts
Carrig & Riverstown	5	4	1	0	128	85	43	9
Lusmagh	5	3	2	0	113	85	28	8
Kilcormac–Killoughey	5	3	0	2	103	90	13	6
Clara	5	2	1	2	84	101	-17	5
Clodiagh Gaels	4	0	0	4	63	82	-19	0
Coolderry	4	0	0	4	70	118	-48	0

=== Group stage results ===
12 July 2025 Round 1	Clodiagh Gaels	0-16 - 2-18	Carrig & Riverstown	Clodiagh Gaels Grounds
	L Langton 0-11 (4f and 1 '65'), A Gorman and C Langton 0-2 each, R Dunne 0-1.	Report	A Coakley 2-3, W Gleeson 0-4 (2f), C King, P Bergin, C Freeman and D Egan 0-2 each, T Hogan, C Larkin, J Hoctor 0-1 each.

13 July 2025 Round 1	Coolderry	0-16 - 2-15	Clara	Coolderry Grounds
		Report

13 July 2025 Round 1	Kilcormac–Killoughey	0-15 - 2-20	Lusmagh	Kilcormac GAA Grounds
		Report

24 July 2025 Round 2	Lusmagh	3-21 - 1-18	Coolderry	Lusmagh Grounds
		Report

25 July 2025 Round 2	Clara	1-16 - 0-18	Clodiagh Gaels	Clara Grounds
		Report

26 July 2025 Round 2	Carrig & Riverstown	2-18 - 1-15	Kilcormac–Killoughey	Páirc na Carraige & Baile Uí Lachnáin
		Report

8 August 2025 Round 3	Kilcormac–Killoughey	1-12 - 0-13	Clodiagh Gaels	Glenisk O'Connor Park

9 August 2025 Round 3	Lusmagh	1-13 - 1-13	Clara	St Rynagh's Park

9 August 2025 Round 3	Carrig & Riverstown	2-29 - 0-19	Coolderry	Shinrone Grounds

22 August 2025 Round 4	Clodiagh Gaels	0-16 - 2-18	Lusmagh	Kilcormac GAA Grounds

23 August 2025 Round 4	Clara	0-15 - 1-25	Carrig & Riverstown	Grant Heating St Brendan's Park

25 August 2025 Round 4	Coolderry	1-11 - 3-23	Kilcormac–Killoughey	Clareen Grounds

6 September 2025 Round 5	Carrig & Riverstown	0-17 - 0-17	Lusmagh	Grant Heating St Brendan's Park

6 September 2025 Round 5	Kilcormac–Killoughey	1-20 - 0-13	Clara	St Rynagh's Park

== Relegation stage ==
=== Relegation playoff ===
5 September 2025 Playoff	Clodiagh Gaels	4-26 - 2-13	Coolderry	Faithful Fields
		Report

== Knockout stage ==
=== Semi-finals ===
20 September 2025 Semi-final	Carrig & Riverstown	1-21 - 2-15	Clara	Grant Heating St Brendan's Park
	W Gleeson 0-6f, C Freeman 1-2, L Hogan 0-3 (0-1f), D Egan 0-2, B Hoctor 0-2 (0-1f, 0-1 65), P King 0-1, P Bergin 0-1, M O’Brien 0-1, C King 0-1, L Hoare 0-1f, J Hoctor 0-1.	Report	R Brady 2-0, C Delaney 0-4f, J Fleming 0-3, C Doyle 0-3 (0-2f), M Dalton 0-2, J Ledwith 0-1, C Egan 0-1, B Egan 0-1.

21 September 2025 Semi-final	Lusmagh	3-18 - 0-16	Kilcormac–Killoughey	St Rynagh's Park
	E Quinlan 0-6, P Kinsella (5frees) 1-7, L Bowe and G Lynch 1-0, A Kelly 0-2, S Lanigan, D Healy and R Kelly 0-1 each.	Report	L Kavanagh (6frees) 0-7, D Hand (3frees) 0-4, L Kavanagh (1free) 0-3, S Guinan 0-2.

=== Final ===
5 October 2025 Final	Carrig & Riverstown	0-19 - 1-19	Lusmagh	Grant Heating St Brendan's Park
	W Gleeson 0-9 (9f), M O'Brien 0-4 (1f), C King and D Egan 0-2 each, C Freeman and L Hogan 0-1 each.	Report	P Kinsella 1-10 (5f), D Healy 0-4, E Kelly and S Lanigan 0-2 each, G Lynch 0-1.
