= 2020 Offaly Senior B Hurling Championship =

Annual hurling competition season

- Dates: 1 August 2020 - 22 August 2021
- Teams: 8
- Sponsor: Molloy Environmental
- Champions: Kinnitty (1st title)
- Runners-up: Drumcullen
- Relegated: Carrig-Riverstown

The 2020 Offaly Senior B Hurling Championship was the third staging of the Offaly Senior B Hurling Championship since its establishment by the Offaly County Board. The championship began on 1 August 2020, but was later suspended due to the impact of the COVID-19 pandemic on Gaelic games. The championship was later restarted and eventually concluded on 22 August 2021.

The final was played on 22 August 2021 at Bord na Móna O'Connor Park in Tullamore, between Kinnitty and Drumcullen, in what was their first ever meeting in the final. Kinnitty won the match by 0–16 to 1–10 to claim their first ever championship title.

== Team changes ==
=== To Championship ===
Relegated from the Offaly Senior Hurling Championship

- Kinnitty

Promoted from the Offaly Intermediate Hurling Championship

- Clara

=== From Championship ===
Promoted to the Offaly Senior Hurling Championship

- Seir Kieran

Relegated to the Offaly Intermediate Hurling Championship

- Shamrocks

== Knockout stage ==
=== Semi-finals ===
26 September 2020 Semi-final	Drumcullen	3-14 - 2-15	Tullamore	St Brendan's Park
	Conor Gath 0-8, D Gath 1-2, Colm Gath 1-0, E Gath 1-0, M Kennedy Jnr 0-2, P Guinan 0-2.		S Dooley 1-10, G Mann 1-0, M Fox 0-1, S Kelly 0-1, J Dooley 0-1, G Treacy 0-1, D Hensey 0-1.

26 September 2020 Semi-final	Kinnitty	2-15 - 0-17	Clodiagh Gaels	Bord na Móna O'Connor Park
	C Coughlan 0-7, A Kealey 1-1, T Leahy 1-0, O Kealey 0-1, C Hardiman 0-1, J Dempsey 0-1, C Carroll 0-1, S Kinsella 0-1, E Callaghan 0-1.		L Langton 0-7, D Dunne 0-4, C Langton 0-2, D Buckley 0-1, C Brady 0-1, A Flanagan 0-1, S Dolan 0-1.

=== Final ===
22 August 2021 Final	Kinnitty	0-16 - 1-10	Drumcullen	Bord na Móna O'Connor Park
	C Coughlan 0-10, O Kealey 0-2, C Leonard 0-1, A Kealey 0-1, S Kinsella 0-1, K Bergin 0-1.		Colm Gath 1-3, Conor Gath 0-4, P Guinan 0-1, M Kennedy Jnr 0-1, S Kinsella 0-1.
