= Shane Hand =

Irish hurling manager and former player

Personal information
- Native name: Seán Mag Laithimh (Irish)
- Born: 1975 (age 50–51) Kilcormac, County Offaly, Ireland

Sport
- Sport: Hurling
- Position: Midfield
Club
- Years: Club
- Kilcormac–Killoughey
Club titles
- Offaly titles: 0
Inter-county
- Years: County
- 1994-1995: Offaly
Inter-county titles
- Leinster titles: 0
- All-Irelands: 0
- NHL: 0
- All Stars: 0
Club management
- Years: Club
- 2016-2019 2020-2021 2022-: Ballinamere; Drumcullen; Kilcormac–Killoughey

Shane Hand (born 1975) is an Irish hurling manager and former player. He is the current manager of the Kilcormac–Killoughey team, having also played for the club. Hand also lined out at various inter-county levels with Offaly.

== Playing career ==
Hand first played hurling to a high standard as a student at Kilcormac Vocational School. At club level, he was part of three successive Offaly U21HC-winning teams during a hugely successful underage era for the Kilcormac–Killoughey club.

He later played at adult level with Kilcormac–Killoughey. At inter-county level, Hand first played for Offaly during a two-year tenure with the minor team. He later lined out with the under-21 team but ended his underage career without success. Hand's only senior team appearance was in a 3–06 to 2–06 defeat by Down in the National Hurling League.

== Management career ==
Hand had his first success in club management when he guided Ballinamere to the Offaly IHC title in 2017. He secured a second successive promotion after managing the team to the Offaly SBHC in 2018. Hand later took charge of his home club of Kilcormac–Killoughey. He managed the team to three successive Offaly SHC final appearances, with consecutive wins in 2023 and 2024.

== Honours ==
=== Player ===
Kilcormac–Killoughey

- Offaly Under-21 Hurling Championship: 1994, 1995, 1996

=== Management ===
Ballinamere

- Offaly Senior B Hurling Championship: 2018
- Offaly Intermediate Hurling Championship: 2017

Kilcormac–Killoughey

- Offaly Senior Hurling Championship: 2023, 2024
