= Ruairí Kelly =

Irish hurler

Personal information
- Native name: Ruairí Ó Ceallaigh (Irish)
- Born: 2005 (age 20–21) Lusmagh, County Offaly, Ireland
- Occupation: Student

Sport
- Sport: Hurling
- Position: Left corner-back
Club
- Years: Club
- 2023-present: Lusmagh
Club titles
- Offaly titles: 0
College
- Years: College
- 2024-present: University of Limerick
College titles
- Fitzgibbon titles: 0
Inter-county
- Years: County
- 2026-: Offaly
Inter-county titles
- Leinster titles: 0
- All-Irelands: 0
- NHL: 0
- All Stars: 0

Ruairí Kelly (born 2005) is an Irish hurler. At club level he plays with Lusmagh and at inter-county level with the Offaly senior hurling team.

== Career ==
Kelly played hurling at all grades during his time as a student at Banagher College. He was part of the school's senior team that won the Leinster PPS SBHC title in 2024. Kelly's performances for the school resulted in his earlier inclusion on the combined Offaly Schools team which won the Leinster PPS SAHC in 2023. He has also lined out for the University of Limerick and won a Freshers 1 Hurling Championship title in 2025.

After progressing through the juvenile and underage ranks with the Lusmagh club, Kelly made his senior team debut in 2023. He won an Offaly SBHC medal in 2025, following a 1–19 to 0–19 win over Carrig & Riverstown in the final.

Kelly first appeared on the inter-county scene for Offaly during a two-year tenure with the minor team. His last game in the grade was a defeat by Tipperary in the 2022 All-Ireland MHC final. Kelly immediately progressed to the under-20 team in 2023, however, Offaly lost the 2023 All-Ireland U20HC final to Cork. He collected an All-Ireland U20HC winners' medal after beating Tipperary by 2–20 to 2–14 in the All-Ireland U20HC final.

Kelly made his senior team debut during the 2026 National Hurling League.

== Honours ==
Banagher College

- Leinster PPS Senior B Hurling Championship: 2024

Offaly Schools

- Leinster PPS Senior A Hurling Championship: 2023

University of Limerick

- Higher Education Freshers 1 Hurling League: 2025

Lusmagh

- Offaly Senior B Hurling Championship: 2025

Offaly

- All-Ireland Under-20 Hurling Championship: 2024
- Leinster Under-20 Hurling Championship: 2023, 2024
- Leinster Minor Hurling Championship: 2022
