= 2019 Offaly Senior B Hurling Championship =

Annual hurling competition season

- Teams: 8
- Sponsor: Molloy Environmental
- Champions: Seir Kieran (1st title); Seán Coughlan (captain); Adrian Hynes (captain)
- Runners-up: Clodiagh Gaels; Darryl Kilroe (captain)
- Relegated: Shamrocks

The 2019 Offaly Senior B Hurling Championship was the second staging of the Offaly Senior B Hurling Championship since its establishment by the Offaly County Board.

The final was played on 19 October 2019 at St Brendan's Park in Birr, between Seir Kieran and Clodiagh Gaels, in what was their first ever meeting in the final. Seir Kieran won the match by 1–20 to 0–14 to claim their first ever championship title.

== Team changes ==
=== To Championship ===
Relegated from the Offaly Senior Hurling Championship

- Seir Kieran

Promoted from the Offaly Intermediate Hurling Championship

- Kilcormac–Killoughey

=== From Championship ===
Promoted to the Offaly Senior Hurling Championship

- Ballinamere

Relegated to the Offaly Intermediate Hurling Championship

- Brosna Gaels

== Knockout stage ==
=== Final ===
19 October 2019 Final	Seir Kieran	1-20 - 0-14	Clodiagh Gaels	St Brendan's Park
	J Bergin 0-11, T Carroll 1-2, S Hynes 0-2, A Hynes 0-2, J Mulrooney 0-2, P Murray 0-1.		C Brady 0-6, L Langton 0-4, D Dunne 0-1, G Shiels 0-1, D Buckley 0-1, R Casey 0-1.	Referee: C Groome
