= Eddie Bevans =

Irish hurler (1985–2026)

Personal information
- Native name: Éamonn Ó Bébhinn (Irish)
- Born: 1985 Shinrone, County Offaly, Ireland
- Died: 28 June 2026 (aged 41) Shinrone, County Offaly, Ireland

Sport
- Sport: Hurling
- Position: Right wing-forward
Club
- Years: Club
- Shinrone
Club titles
- Offaly titles: 0
Inter-county*
Years	County	Apps (scores)
2006-2007	Offaly	5 (0-05)
Inter-county titles
- Leinster titles: 0
- All-Irelands: 0
- NHL: 0
- All Stars: 0
- *Inter County team apps and scores correct as of 10:30, 1 July 2026.

Edward Bevans (1985 – 28 June 2026) was an Irish hurler. At club level, he played with Shinrone and at inter-county level with the Offaly senior hurling team.

== Career ==
Bevans was educated at Coláiste Phobal Ros Cré in Roscrea and played in all grades of hurling during his time there. He was part of the school's senior team that was beaten by Athenry Vocational School in the 2001 All-Ireland VS JHC final.

At club level, Bevans first played hurling for Shinrone at juvenile and underage levels. He progressed to adult level and spent a number of years with the club's senior team. Bevans won an Offaly JAHC medal in October 2018, after a 1–12 to 0–12 win over Tullamore in the final.

Bevans first appeared on the inter-county scene for Offaly during a two-year tenure with the minor team in 2002 and 2003. He later spent three years with the under-21 team. Bevans made his senior team debut in a Leinster SHC game against Wexford in June 2006. He was a regular during his two years with the team and played his last game in July 2007.

== Death ==
Bevans was diagnosed with motor neurone disease in July 2025. He died on 28 June 2026, at the age of 41.

== Honours ==
Coláiste Phobal Ros Cré

- Munster Vocational Schools Junior Hurling Championship (1): 2001

Shinrone

- Offaly Junior A Hurling Championship (1): 2018
