= 1960 Offaly Senior Hurling Championship =

Annual hurling competition season

- Champions: Drumcullen (17th title); Paddy Molloy (captain)
- Runners-up: Shinrone

The 1960 Offaly Senior Hurling Championship was the 63rd staging of the Offaly Senior Hurling Championship since its establishment by the Offaly County Board in 1896.

Tullamore entered the championship as the defending champions, however, they were beaten by Drumcullen in the semi-finals.

The final was played on 9 October 1960 at St Brendan's Park in Birr, between Drumcullen and Shinrone, in what was their first ever meeting in the final. Drumcullen won the match by 4–11 to 4–10 to claim their 17th championship title overall and a first championship title in two years.

== Results ==
=== Semi-finals ===
28 August 1960 Semi-final	Drumcullen	4-12 - 1-10	Tullamore	St Brendan's Park

28 August 1960 Semi-final	Shinrone	8-05 - 1-05	Birr	St Brendan's Park

=== Final ===
9 October 1960 Final	Drumcullen	4-11 - 4-10	Shinrone	St Brendan's Park
