= 2018 Offaly Senior B Hurling Championship =

Annual hurling competition season

- Dates: 1 April - 6 October 2018
- Teams: 8
- Sponsor: Molloy Environmental
- Champions: Ballinamere (1st title); Ken Molloy (captain); Shane Hand (manager)
- Runners-up: Shamrocks; Dan Heffernan (captain)
- Relegated: Brosna Gaels

Tournament statistics
- Matches played: 34
- Goals scored: 89 (2.62 per match)
- Points scored: 1044 (30.71 per match)

The 2018 Offaly Senior B Hurling Championship was the first staging of the Offaly Senior B Hurling Championship since its establishment by the Offaly County Board. The championship ran from 1 April to 6 October 2018.

The final was played on 6 October 2018 at Bord na Móna O'Connor Park in Tullamore, between Ballinamere and Shamrocks, in what was their first ever meeting in the final. Ballinamere won the match by 2–16 to 3–10 to claim their first ever championship title.

== Team changes ==
Relegated from the Offaly Senior Hurling Championship

- Clodiagh Gaels
- Lusmagh
- Shamrocks
- Tullamore

Promoted from the Offaly Intermediate Hurling Championship

- Ballinamere
- Brosna Gaels
- Carrig-Riverstown
- Drumcullen

== Group stage ==
=== Group stage table ===
Semi-finalists Quarter-finalists Relegation playoff

Team	Matches				Score			Pts
Team	Pld	W	D	L	For	Against	Diff	Pts
Tullamore	7	4	2	1	154	126	28	10
Ballinamere	7	3	3	1	157	118	39	9
Lusmagh	7	3	2	2	142	127	15	8
Shamrocks	7	4	0	3	137	135	2	8
Drumcullen	7	4	0	3	117	125	-8	8
Clodiagh Gaels	7	3	1	3	150	153	-3	7
Carrig-Riverstown	7	2	0	5	123	146	-23	4
Brosna Gaels	7	1	0	6	104	154	-50	2

== Knockout stage ==
=== Relegation playoff ===
9 September 2018 Playoff	Brosna Gaels	0-15 - 1-18	Carrig-Riverstown	Drumcullen Grounds

=== Quarter-finals ===
8 September 2018 Quarter-final	Shamrocks	0-25 - 1-21	Drumcullen	St Brendan's Park

9 September 2018 Quarter-final	Lusmagh	1-13 - 0-20	Clodiagh Gaels	Bord na Móna O'Connor Park

=== Semi-finals ===
23 September 2018 Semi-final	Tullamore	0-12 - 2-11	Shamrocks	Bord na Móna O'Connor Park

23 September 2018 Semi-final	Ballinamere	0-19 - 2-11	Clodiagh Gaels	Bord na Móna O'Connor Park

=== Final ===
6 October 2018 Final	Ballinamere	2-16 - 3-10	Shamrocks	Bord na Móna O'Connor Park
	B Duignan 0-8, J Murphy 1-2, A Maher 1-1, P Murphy 0-2, D Magner 0-1, A Spollen 0-1, D Wyer 0-1.		N Dunne 1-1, J O'Toole-Greene 0-4, B Tyrrell 1-1, B Kearney 1-0, G Mooney 0-2, C O'Brien 0-1, W Mooney 0-1.
