= Colm Coughlan =

Irish hurler

Personal information
- Native name: Colm Ó Cochláin (Irish)
- Born: 2005 (age 20–21) Kinnitty, County Offaly, Ireland
- Occupation: Physiotherapist

Sport
- Sport: Hurling
- Position: Right corner-forward
Club
- Years: Club
- 2009-2014: Kinnitty
Club titles
- Offaly titles: 0
College
- Years: College
- Dublin City University
College titles
- Fitzgibbon titles: 0
Inter-county
Years	County	Apps (scores)
2009-2014	Offaly	2 (0-02)
Inter-county titles
- Leinster titles: 0
- All-Irelands: 0
- NHL: 0
- All Stars: 0

Colm Coughlan (born 1987) is an Irish former hurler. At club level he played with Kinnitty and at inter-county level with the Offaly senior hurling team.

== Career ==
Coughlan attended St Brendan's Community School in Birr and played in all grades of hurling during his time there. He later studied at Dublin City University (DCU) and continued his hurling career. Coughlin played in various competitions, including the Kehoe Cup, and was part of the DCU team beaten b Institute of Technology, Carlow in the Ryan Cup in 2020.

At club level, Coughlan first played for Kinnitty at juvenile and underage levels, before eventually progressing to adult level. He was part of the Kinnitty team that won the Offaly SBHC title in 2020, after beating Drumcullen by 0–16 to 1–10 in the final.

Coughlan first appeared on the inter-county scene for Offaly as a member of the minor team in 2005. He was the team's top scorer that year, with 3–15 in four games. He later spent two consecutive years with the under-21 team. Coughlan made his senior team debut in a National Hurling League game against Westmeath in February 2009. He ended the season with a Division 2 medal. Coughlan made a return to the team for a National League game against Antrim in March 2014.

== Honours ==
Kinnitty

- Offaly Senior B Hurling Championship (1): 2020

Offaly

- National Hurling League Division 2 (1): 2009
