= Liam Langton =

Irish hurler (born 1997)

Personal information
- Native name: Liam Langtún (Irish)
- Born: 1997 (age 28–29) Killeigh, County Offaly, Ireland

Sport
- Sport: Hurling
- Position: Centre-forward
Club
- Years: Club
- Clodiagh Gaels
Club titles
- Offaly titles: 0
Inter-county*
Years	County	Apps (scores)
2016-present	Offaly	0 (0-00)
Inter-county titles
- Leinster titles: 0
- All-Irelands: 0
- NHL: 0
- All Stars: 0
- *Inter County team apps and scores correct as of 23:34, 13 July 2021.

Liam Langton (born 1997) is an Irish hurler who plays for Offaly Championship club Clodiagh Gaels and at inter-county level with the Offaly senior hurling team. He usually lines out as a forward.

== Career ==
Born in Killeigh, County Offaly, Langton first came to hurling prominence with the Clodiagh Gaels team that won the County Intermediate Championship title in 2016. He first appeared on the inter-county scene with the Offaly minor team during the 2015 Leinster Minor Championship before a three-year stint with the under-21 team. Langton made his debut with the Offaly senior hurling team during the 2016 National Hurling League.

== Honours ==
Clodiagh Gaels

- Offaly Intermediate Hurling Championship: 2016

Offaly

- Christy Ring Cup: 2021
- National Hurling League Division 2A: 2021
