= Jack Screeney =

Irish hurler

Personal information
- Born: 2002 (age 23–24) Kilcormac, County Offaly, Ireland
- Occupation: Student

Sport
- Sport: Hurling
- Position: Half back
Club
- Years: Club
- Kilcormac–Killoughey
Club titles
- Offaly titles: 1
College
- Years: College
- 2020-present: DCU Dóchas Éireann
College titles
- Fitzgibbon titles: 0
Inter-county
- Years: County
- 2021-2023: Offaly
Inter-county titles
- Leinster titles: 0
- All-Irelands: 0
- NHL: 0
- All Stars: 0

Jack Screeney (born 2002) is an Irish hurler who plays for Offaly Championship club Kilcormac–Killoughey and formerly at inter-county level with the Offaly senior hurling team. He is a brother of Adam Screeney.

== Career ==
Born in Kilcormac, County Offaly, Screeny first came to hurling prominence at juvenile and underage levels with the Kilcormac–Killoughey club. He first appeared on the inter-county scene during a two-year stint with the Offaly minor team where on his second year captained the side before later lining out with the under-20 team. Screeney was still eligible for the under-20 grade when he was drafted onto the Offaly senior hurling team and was a substitute on their 2021 Christy Ring Cup-winning team.

== Honours ==
Kilcormac–Killoughey

- Offaly Senior Hurling Championship: 2023

Offaly

- Christy Ring Cup: 2021

Sporting positions
Preceded by	Offaly under-20 hurling team captain 2022	Succeeded by Charlie Mitchell
