= Dylan Murray =

Dylan Murray may refer to:

- Dylan Murray (squash player) (born 1995), American professional squash player
- Dylan Murray (hurler) (born 1995), Irish hurler
