= Offaly Senior B Hurling Championship =

Annual hurling competition for senior clubs in Offaly

- Current season or competition: 2026 Offaly Senior B Hurling Championship
- Irish: Craobh Iomána Sinsearach B Uibh Fháilí
- Code: Hurling
- Founded: 2018; 8 years ago
- Region: Offaly (GAA)
- Trophy: Michael Verney Cup
- No. of teams: 6
- Title holders: Clodiagh Gaels (2nd title)
- First winner: Ballinamere
- Most titles: Kilcormac–Killoughey, Clodiagh Gaels (2 titles)
- Sponsors: Molloy Environmental Systems
- Official website: Offaly GAA

The Offaly Senior B Hurling Championship (known for sponsorship reasons as the Molloy Environmental Systems Offaly Senior B Hurling Championship and abbreviated to the Offaly SBHC) is an annual hurling competition organised by the Offaly County Board of the Gaelic Athletic Association from 2018 for the second tier senior hurling teams in the county of Offaly in Ireland.

In its current format, the Offaly Senior B Hurling Championship begins with a group stage. The six participating teams play each other in a round-robin system. The four top-ranking teams proceed to the knockout phase that culminates with the final match at Glenisk O'Connor Park. The winner of the Offaly Senior B Championship qualifies for the subsequent Leinster Intermediate Club Championship.

Clodiagh Gaels are the title holders after defeating Seir Kieran by 0–17 to 0–16 in the 2026 final.

== History ==
The Offaly Intermediate Championship was founded in 1929 in an effort to bridge the standard of play between the Offaly Senior Championship and the Offaly Junior Championship. For almost 90 years, the Offaly Intermediate Championship was effectively the second tier championship in the Offaly hurling championship system.

A review of Offaly's hurling structures in 2017 proposed that the Offaly SHC and Offaly IHC be reduced from 12 to eight teams. This resulted in the creation of a new eight-team Offaly Senior B Hurling Championship. The inaugural championship in 2018 featured four regraded teams from the 2017 Offaly SHC: Clodiagh Gaels, Lusmagh, Shamrocks and Tullamore. The remaining four teams were the 2017 Offaly IHC semi-finalists: Ballinamere, Brosna Gaels, Carrig-Riverstown and Drumcullen.

The very first match in the inaugural championship took place on 1 April 2018, with Tullamore beating Clodiagh Gaels by 3–17 to 2–11. Ballinamere won the inaugural championship after beating Shamrocks in the final. Brosna Gaels were the first team to suffer relegation after losing a playoff to Carrig-Riverstown.

== Format ==
=== Group stage ===
Six clubs start in the group stage. Over the course of the group stage, each team plays once against the others in the group, resulting in each team being guaranteed five group games. Two points are awarded for a win, one for a draw and zero for a loss. The teams are ranked in the group stage table by points gained, then scoring difference and then their head-to-head record. The top four teams qualify for the knockout stage

=== Knockout stage ===
Semi-finals: The top four teams from the group stage contest this round. The two winners from these two games advance to the final.

Final: The two semi-final winners contest the final. The winning team are declared champions.

=== Relegation ===
The fifth and sixth-placed teams from the group stage take part in a relegation playoff to determine who drops to the Offaly Intermediate Hurling Championship.

== Teams ==
=== 2026 Teams ===
The 6 teams competing in the 2026 Offaly Senior B Hurling Championship are:

Team	Location	In championship since	Championship titles	Last championship title
Carrig & Riverstown	Birr	2024	0	—
Clara	Clara	2025	0	—
Clodiagh Gaels	Killeigh	2023	1	2021
Drumcullen	Drumcullen	2026	0	—
Kilcormac–Killoughey	Kilcormac and Killoughey	2019	2	2024
Seir Kieran	Clareen	2026	1	2019

== Qualification for subsequent competitions ==
At the end of the championship, the winning team qualify to the subsequent Leinster Intermediate Club Hurling Championship, the winner of which progresses to the All-Ireland Intermediate Club Hurling Championship.

== List of finals ==
Year	Winners		Runners-up		Venue	#
Year	Club	Score	Club	Score	Venue	#
2026	Clodiagh Gaels	0-17	Seir Kieran	0-16	Glenisk O'Connor Park	
2025	Lusmagh	1–19	Carrig & Riverstown	0–19	Grant Heating St Brendan's Park	
2024	Kilcormac–Killoughey	1–13	Clodiagh Gaels	0–09	Glenisk O'Connor Park	
2023	Kilcormac–Killoughey	0–12	Clodiagh Gaels	0–08	Glenisk O'Connor Park	
2022	Tullamore	3–09	Clara	0–09	Glenisk O'Connor Park	
2021	Clodiagh Gaels	2–10	Tullamore	1–12	St Brendan's Park	
2020	Kinnitty	0–16	Drumcullen	1–10	Bord na Móna O'Connor Park	
2019	Seir Kieran	1–20	Clodiagh Gaels	0–14	St Brendan's Park	
2018	Ballinamere	2–16	Shamrocks	3–10	Bord na Móna O'Connor Park	

== Roll of honour ==
=== By club ===
#	Club	Titles	Runners-up	Championship wins	Championship runner-up
1	Clodiagh Gaels	2	3	2021, 2026	2019, 2023, 2024
1	Kilcormac–Killoughey	2	0	2023, 2024	—
3	Tullamore	1	1	2022	2021
3	Seir Kieran	1	1	2019	2026
3	Ballinamere	1	0	2018	—
3	Kinnitty	1	0	2020	—
3	Lusmagh	1	0	2025	—
8	Shamrocks	0	1	—	2018
8	Drumcullen	0	1	—	2020
8	Clara	0	1	—	2022
8	Carrig & Riverstown	0	1	—	2025

== See also ==
- Offaly Senior Hurling Championship
- Offaly Intermediate Hurling Championship
- Offaly Junior A Hurling Championship
