= John Murphy (Offaly hurler) =

Irish hurler

Personal information
- Native name: Seán Ó Murchú (Irish)
- Born: 1999 (age 26–27) Ballinamere, County Offaly, Ireland
- Occupation: Student

Sport
- Sport: Hurling
- Position: Full-forward
Club
- Years: Club
- Ballinamere
Club titles
- Offaly titles: 0
Inter-county
- Years: County
- 2021-: Offaly
Inter-county titles
- Leinster titles: 0
- All-Irelands: 0
- NHL: 0
- All Stars: 0

John Murphy (born 1999) is an Irish hurler who plays for Offaly Championship club Ballinamere and at inter-county level with the Offaly senior hurling team. He usually lines out as a forward.

== Career ==
Murphy first came to hurling prominence with the combined Ballinamere/Durrow club at juvenile and underage levels, before later joining the Ballinamere club's top adult team. He first appeared on the inter-county scene as a member of the Offaly under-17 team that won the Celtic Challenge in 2016. After also lining out with the Offaly under-20 team, Murphy was drafted onto the senior team in advance of the 2021 National Hurling League.

== Career statistics ==
As of match played 13 June 2021.

Team	Year	National League			Ring Cup		Total	
Team	Year	Division	Apps	Score	Apps	Score	Apps	Score
Offaly	2021	Division 2A	5	1-09	1	0-04	6	1-13
Total			5	1-09	1	0-04	6	1-13

== Honours ==
Offaly

- Christy Ring Cup: 2021
- National Hurling League Division 2A: 2021
