= 1959 Offaly Senior Hurling Championship =

Annual hurling competition season

- Champions: Tullamore (8th title)
- Runners-up: Coolderry

The 1959 Offaly Senior Hurling Championship was the 62nd staging of the Offaly Senior Hurling Championship since its establishment by the Offaly County Board in 1896.

Drumcullen entered the championship as the defending champions.

The final, a replay, was played on 11 October 1959 at St Brendan's Park in Birr, between Tullamore and Coolderry, in what was their first meeting in the final in 14 years. Tullamore won the match by 3–12 to 3–01 to claim their eighth championship title overall and a first championship title in four years

== Results ==
=== Final ===
13 September 1959 Final	Tullamore	3-09 - 3-09	Coolderry	St Brendan's Park

=== Final replay ===
11 October 1959 Final replay	Tullamore	3-12 - 3-01	Coolderry	St Brendan's Park
