= Brendan Keeshan =

Irish hurler (born 1957)

Personal information
- Native name: Breandán Ó Ciseáin (Irish)
- Born: 22 July 1957 (age 69) Shinrone, County Offaly, Ireland
- Occupation: Painter
- Height: 5 ft 6 in (168 cm)

Sport
- Sport: Hurling
- Position: Right corner-back
Club
- Years: Club
- Shinrone
Club titles
- Offaly titles: 0
Inter-county*
Years	County	Apps (scores)
1976-1988	Offaly	26 (0-00)
Inter-county titles
- Leinster titles: 3
- All-Irelands: 2
- NHL: 0
- All Stars: 0
- *Inter County team apps and scores correct as of 19:59, 28 June 2014.

Brendan Keeshan (22 July 1957) is an Irish retired hurler who played as a right wing-back for the Offaly senior team.

Born in Shinrone, County Offaly, Keeshan first played competitive hurling in his youth. He made his senior debut with Offaly during the 1976-77 National League and immediately became a regular member of the team. During his career Keeshan won two All-Ireland medals and three Leinster medals.

Keeshan was a member of the Leinster inter-provincial team on a number of occasions, however, he never won a Railway Cup medal. At club level he played with Shinrone.

His retirement came following the conclusion of the 1988 championship.

== Honours ==
=== Team ===
Offaly

- All-Ireland Senior Hurling Championship (2): 1981, 1985
- Leinster Senior Hurling Championship (5): 1980, 1984, 1988
