= Mark Troy =

Irish hurler

Personal information
- Native name: Marc Ó Troithigh (Irish)
- Born: 2003 (age 22–23) Durrow, County Offaly, Ireland
- Occupation: Student

Sport
- Sport: Hurling
- Position: Goalkeeper
Club
- Years: Club
- 2021-present: Ballinamere
Club titles
- Offaly titles: 0
College
- Years: College
- 2021-present: SETU Carlow
College titles
- Fitzgibbon titles: 0
Inter-county
- Years: County
- 2024-: Offaly
Inter-county titles
- Leinster titles: 0
- All-Irelands: 0
- NHL: 0
- All Stars: 0

Mark Troy (born 2003) is an Irish hurler. At club level he plays with Ballinamere and at inter-county level with the Offaly senior hurling team. He is a son of Jim Troy.

== Career ==
Troy first played hurling to a high standard as a student at Coláiste Choilm in Tullamore. After progressing through the juvenile and underage ranks as an outfield player with the Ballinamere club, he made his senior team debut in 2021. Troy has also lined out for SETU Carlow in the Fitzgibbon Cup.

Troy first appeared on the inter-county scene during a spell with the Offaly minor hurling team, which culminated with a defeat by Kilkenny in the 2020 Leinster minor final. He immediately progressed to the under-20 team and was in goal when they lost the 2023 All-Ireland under-20 final to Cork.

Troy made his senior team debut in a defeat by Carlow in a National Hurling League game against Wexford in 2024, and quickly established himself as first-choice goalkeeper. He won a Joe McDonagh Cup medal in his debut season after a defeat of Laois in the final.

== Honours ==
Offaly

- Joe McDonagh Cup: 2024
- Leinster Under-20 Hurling Championship: 2023
