= Colm Cassidy =

Irish hurler

Personal information
- Native name: Colm Ó Caisidé (Irish)
- Born: 11 March 1978 (age 48) Kilcormac, County Offaly, Ireland
- Height: 5 ft 11 in (180 cm)

Sport
- Sport: Hurling
- Position: Left wing-back
Club
- Years: Club
- 1996-present: Kilcormac–Killoughey
Inter-county
Years	County	Apps (scores)
1997-2005	Offaly	118 (0-11)
Inter-county titles
- Leinster titles: 0
- All-Irelands: 1 (as sub)
- NHL: 0
- All Stars: 23

Colm Cassidy (born 11 March 1978, in Kilcormac, County Offaly, Ireland) is an Irish sportsperson. He plays hurling with his local club Kilcormac–Killoughey and was a member of the Offaly senior inter-county team from 1997 until 2005.
