= Martin Heffernan (Gaelic footballer) =

Irish Gaelic footballer (1944–2021)

Personal information
- Native name: Máirtín Ó hIfearnáin (Irish)
- Born: 1944 Tullamore, County Offaly, Ireland
- Died: 22 February 2021 (aged 76) Tullamore, County Offaly, Ireland

Sport
- Sport: Gaelic football
- Position: Left corner-forward
Club
- Years: Club
- Tullamore
Club titles
- Offaly titles: 1
Inter-county*
| Years | County | Apps (scores) |
| 1966 | Offaly | 0 (0–0) |
Inter-county titles
- Leinster titles: 0
- All-Irelands: 0
- NFL: 0
- *Inter County team apps and scores correct as of 15:10, 23 February 2021.

Martin P. Heffernan (1944 – 22 February 2021) was an Irish Gaelic footballer and Gaelic games administrator. At club level he lined out with Tullamore and was a member of the Offaly senior football team during the 1966–67 National League. Heffernan also served for several years as Offaly Bord na nÓg Secretary.

== Honours ==
Tullamore

- Offaly Senior Football Championship: 1973
