= Peter Nolan (Gaelic footballer) =

Irish Gaelic footballer (1934–2026)

Personal information
- Native name: Peadar Ó Nualláin (Irish)
- Born: 21 February 1935 Clara, County Offaly, Ireland
- Died: 29 October 2026 (aged 91) Williston Park, New York, United States
- Occupation: Marble setter

Sport
- Sport: Gaelic football
- Position: Centre-back
Clubs
- Years: Club
- Clara; New York Offaly
Club titles
- Offaly titles: 1
Inter-county
Years	County	Apps (scores)
1954–1960	Offaly; New York	11 (4–08)
Inter-county titles
- Leinster titles: 0
- All-Irelands: 0
- NFL: 2

Peter Nolan (21 February 1935 – 29 October 2026) was an Irish Gaelic footballer. At club level he played with Clara and at inter-county level with the Offaly senior football team.

== Career ==
Nolan first played Gaelic football and hurling at underage levels with Clara. He was centre-back, with his brother Johnny in goals, when Clara won their first Offaly MFC title in 1952. The club won the Offaly JFC title in 1954, with Nolan lining out at midfield. After defeat in 1955, he claimed an Offaly IFC medal in 1956, following Clara's defeat of St Mary's in the final.

By that stage, Nolan had made his first appearances on the inter-county scene with Offaly. He was just 18 when he made his senior team debut in a National League game against Laois in February 1954 and quickly established himself as a regular. Nolan was at centre-back when Offaly won the O'Byrne Cup in March 1955. His performances at inter-county level also resulted in him being included on the Leinster team. Nolan won a Railway Cup medal in 1959, after a 2–07 to 0–07 defeat of Munster in the final.

Nolan's tally of 4–03 in a defeat of Laois in the Leinster SFC in 1958 was the highest individual score by an Offaly footballer in the championship until Matt Connor equalled it with 2–09 against Kerry in the 1980 All-Ireland SFC semi-final. He made a total of 45 inter-county appearances between 1954 and May 1960, when his emigration to the United States ended his involvement with Offaly.
1960–1969 He returned home for a visit later in the year and lined out for Clara in their Offaly SFC title success.

Nolan joined the New York Offaly club and was full-back for their New York SFC title win in 1964. He also earned selection to the New York senior team and won National League titles in 1964 and 1967.

== Personal life and death ==
Nolan was the eldest of four brothers. Johnny and Willie also played for Offaly, with the latter lining out on the 1960–1961 team that won consecutive Leinster SFC titles. His nephews - David, Willie and John Reynolds - also played with Offaly at various times between 1988 and 2011. Nolan attended the Boys Monastery School in Clara and later worked in Goodbody's Jute Factory. He married Patricia Weir in June 1960. After emigrating to the United States, the couple initially lived in the Bronx before settling in Williston Park in Long Island. Nolan worked as a marble setter.

Nolan died on 29 October 2026, at the age off 91.

== Honours ==
Clara

- Offaly Senior Football Championship (1): 1960
- Offaly Intermediate Football Championship (1): 1954
- Offaly Junior Football Championship (1): 1954
- Offaly Minor Football Championship (1): 1952

Offaly

- O'Byrne Cup (1): 1954

New York

- National Football League (2): 1963–64, 1966–67

Leinster

- Railway Cup (1): 1959
