= Offaly Junior A Hurling Championship =

- Irish: Craobh Iomána Soisearach A Uíbh Fháilí
- Founded: 1907
- Trophy: Jim Clarke Cup
- Title holders: Brosna Gaels (3rd title)
- First winner: Cadamstown
- Most titles: Shinrone (9 titles)
- Sponsors: Molloy Environmental Systems

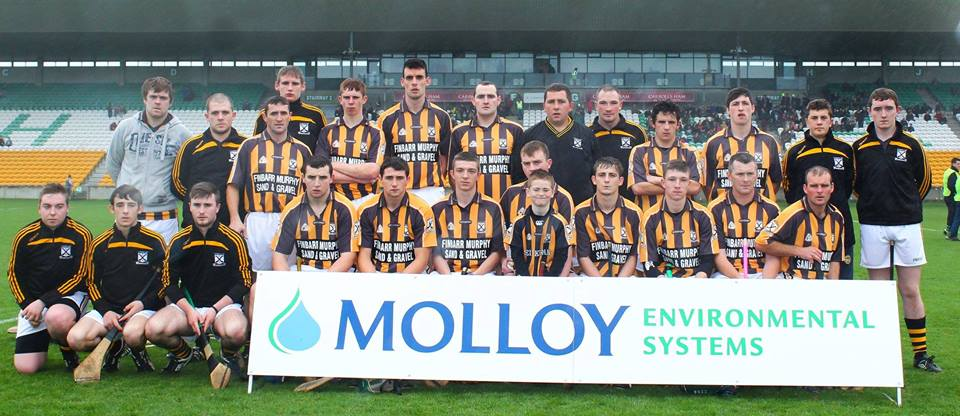
Seir Kieran, 2014 winners

The Offaly Junior A Hurling Championship is an annual hurling competition contested by lower-tier Offaly GAA clubs. The Offaly County Board of the Gaelic Athletic Association has organised it since 1907. The national media covers the competition.

== History ==
The junior championship dates back to 1907. It was the second hurling championship to be established in Offaly, and was originally seen as a second tier championship for teams that were too weak for the senior hurling championships.

== Format ==
The series of games are played during the summer and autumn months with the county final currently being played at O'Connor Park in late autumn. The championship includes a group stage which is followed by a knock-out phase for the top teams.

== Teams ==
=== 2026 Teams ===
The 10 teams competing in the 2026 Offaly Junior A Hurling Championship are:

Team	Location	Colours	Championship titles	Last championship title
Ballyskenagh Killavilla	Ballyskenagh	Red and black	3 (as Ballyskenagh)	1994 (as Ballyskenagh)
Ballyskenagh Killavilla	Ballyskenagh	Red and black	3 (as Killavilla)	1991 (as Killavillla)
Belmont	Belmont	Green and white	4	2019
Carrig & Riverstown	Ballaghgar	Blue and white	5	1995
Clodiagh Gaels	Killeigh	Blue and white	1	2016
Crinkill	Crinkill	Green and white	2	2013
Edenderry	Edenderry	Red and white	5	2022
Kilcormac–Killoughey	Kilcormac and Killoughey	Green and yellow	2	1999
Shamrocks	Mucklagh	Blue, red and green	0	—
St Rynagh's	Cloghan and Banagher	Blue and gold	4	2011
Tullamore	Tullamore	Blue and white	2	1930

== Honours ==
There is promotion involving the Offaly Intermediate Hurling Championship.

== List of finals ==
=== List of Offaly JAHC finals ===
Year	Winners		Runners-up	
Year	Club	Score	Club	Score
1907	Cadamstown			
1908	Coolderry			
1909	Coolderry			
1910	Killoughey			
1911	Kilcormac			
1912	Seir Kieran			
1913	Coolderry			
1914	Coolderry			
1915	Drumcullen			
1916	Kinnitty			
1917	Kinnitty			
1918	Coolderry			
1919	Shinrone			
1920	Clara			
1921	No records given			
1922	No records given			
1923	Seir Kieran			
1924	Shinrone			
1925	Tullamore			
1926	Clara			
1927	Mount Heaton			
1928	Rahan			
1929	Edenderry			
1930	Tullamore			
1931	Coolderry			
1932	Drumcullen			
1933	Lockeen			
1934	Banagher			
1935	Kilcoleman			
1936	Gortnamona			
1937	Seir Kieran			
1938	Eglish			
1939	Killeigh			
1940	Banagher			
1941	Clara|			
1942	Cloghan			
1943	Drumcullen			
1944	Ballinamere			
1945	Brosna			
1946	Carrig & Riverstown			
1947	Kilcormac			
1948	Rahan			
1949	Killeigh			
1950	Ballinamere			
1951	Shinrone			
1952	Belmont			
1953	Edenderry			
1954	St Columba's			
1955	Carrig & Riverstown			
1956	Killavilla			
1957	Belmont			
1958	Seir Kieran			
1959	Ballinamere			
1960	Kilcormac			
1961	Ballyskenagh			
1962	Edenderry			
1963	St Rynagh's			
1964	Killoughey			
1965	St Carthage's			
1966	Kinnitty			
1967	Killeigh			
1968	Shinrone			
1969	Seir Kieran			
1970	Killeigh			
1971	Carrig & Riverstown			
1972	Drumcullen			
1973	Lusmagh			
1974	Drumcullen			
1975	St Rynagh's			
1976	Shinrone			
1977	Ballyskenagh			
1978	St Saran's			
1979	Carrig & Riverstown			
1980	Ballinamere			
1981	Kilcormac			
1982	St Carthage's			
1983	Clara			
1984	Gracefield			
1985	Birr			
1986	Kinnitty			
1987	Mucklagh			
1988	Killavilla			
1989	Ferbane			
1990	Kilcormac–Killoughey			
1991	Killavilla			
1992	Gracefield			
1993	Kinnitty			
1994	Ballyskenagh			
1995	Carrig & Riverstown			
1996	Clara			
1997	Belmont			
1998	Edenderry		Tullamore	
1999	Kilcormac–Killoughey			
2000	Kinnitty		Shinrone	
2001	Crinkill			
2002	St Columba's			
2003	Shinrone		Edenderry	
2004	St Rynagh's			
2005	Drumcullen			
2006	Seir Kieran		St Rynagh's	
2007	Brosna Gaels			
2008	Killurin		Ballinamere	
2009	Shinrone		St Rynagh's	
2010	Ballinamere			
2011	St Rynagh's			
2012	Shinrone		Ballinamere	
2013	Crinkill	1-17	Edenderry	1-12
2014	Seir Kieran		Ballinamere	
2015	Clara		Shinrone	
2016	Clodiagh Gaels			
2017	Ballinamere			
2018	Shinrone		Tullamore	
2019	Belmont			
2020	Kinnitty	2-15	Kilcormac–Killoughey	0-09
2021	Brosna Gaels			
2022	Edenderry	3-14	Ballinamere	1-13
2023	Ballinamere	0-13	Brosna Gaels	0-07
2024	Belmont	1-13	Brosna Gaels	2-09
2025	Brosna Gaels	0-21	Tullamore	2-13

== Roll of honour ==
=== By club ===
#	Club	Titles	Championship wins
1	Shinrone	9	1919, 1924, 1951, 1968, 1976, 2003, 2009, 2012, 2018
2	Seir Kieran	7	1912, 1923, 1937, 1958, 1969, 2006, 2014
2	Kinnitty	7	1916, 1917, 1966, 1986, 1993, 2000, 2020
2	Ballinamere	7	1944, 1950, 1959, 1980, 2010, 2017, 2023
3	Coolderry	6	1908, 1909, 1913, 1914, 1918, 1931
3	Drumcullen	6	1915, 1932, 1943, 1972, 1974, 2005
3	Clara	6	1920, 1926, 1941, 1983, 1996, 2015
4	Carrig & Riverstown	5	1946, 1955, 1971, 1979, 1995
4	Edenderry	5	1929, 1953, 1962, 1998, 2022
4	Belmont	5	1952, 1957, 1997, 2019, 2024
5	St Rynagh's	4	1963, 1975, 2004, 2011
5	Kilcormac	4	1911, 1947, 1960, 1981
5	Killeigh	4	1939, 1949, 1967, 1970
6	Killavilla	3	1956, 1988, 1991
6	Ballyskenagh	3	1961, 1977, 1994
6	Brosna Gaels	3	2007, 2021, 2025
7	Kilcormac–Killoughey	2	1990, 1999
7	Killoughey	2	1910, 1964
7	Tullamore	2	1925, 1930
7	Rahan	2	1928, 1948
7	Banagher	2	1934, 1940
7	St Carthage's	2	1965, 1982
7	Gracefield	2	1984, 1992
7	St Columba's	2	1954, 2002
7	Crinkill	2	2001, 2013
8	Mount Heaton	1	1927
8	Lockeen	1	1933
8	Kilcoleman	1	1935
8	Gortnamona	1	1936
8	Eglish	1	1938
8	Cloghan	1	1942
8	Brosna	1	1945
8	Lusmagh	1	1973
8	St Saran's	1	1978
8	Birr	1	1985
8	Mucklagh	1	1987
8	Ferbane	1	1989
8	Cadamstown	1	1907
8	Killurin	1	2008
8	Clodiagh Gaels	1	2016

== See also ==
- Offaly Senior Hurling Championship (Tier 1)
- Offaly Senior B Hurling Championship (Tier 2)
- Offaly Intermediate Hurling Championship (Tier 3)
