= Noel Mitchell =

Irish hurler

Personal information
- Native name: Nollaig Mistéil (Irish)
- Born: Kilcormac, County Offaly, Ireland

Sport
- Sport: Hurling
- Position: Left wing-back
Club
- Years: Club
- Kilcormac–Killoughey
Club titles
- Offaly titles: 0
Inter-county*
Years	County	Apps (scores)
1983-1985	Offaly	1 (0-00)
Inter-county titles
- Leinster titles: 0
- All-Irelands: 0
- NHL: 0
- All Stars: 0
- *Inter County team apps and scores correct as of 15:41, 29 June 2014.

Noel Mitchell is an Irish retired hurler who played as a midfielder for the Offaly senior team.

Born in Kinnitty, County Offaly, Mitchell first played competitive hurling in his youth. He made his senior debut with Offaly during the 1983-84 National League and immediately became a regular member of the team. During his career Mitchell won one Leinster medal as a non-playing substitute.

At club level Mitchell played with Kilcormac–Killoughey.

His retirement came following the conclusion of the 1984-85 National League.

== Honours ==
=== Team ===
Offaly

- Leinster Senior Hurling Championship (1): 1984 (sub)
