= Dylan Murray (hurler) =

Irish hurler (born 1995)

Personal information
- Native name: Diolún Ó Muirí (Irish)
- Born: 1995 (age 30–31) Kilcormac, County Offaly, Ireland

Sport
- Sport: Hurling
- Position: Centre-forward
Club
- Years: Club
- Kilcormac–Killoughey
Club titles
- Offaly titles: 5
- Leinster titles: 1
- All-Ireland Titles: 0
Inter-county*
Years	County	Apps (scores)
2019	Offaly	0 (0-00)
Inter-county titles
- Leinster titles: 0
- All-Irelands: 0
- NHL: 0
- All Stars: 0
- *Inter County team apps and scores correct as of 17:45, 9 July 2021.

Dylan Murray (born 1995) is an Irish hurler who plays for Offaly Senior Championship club Kilcormac/Killoughey. He is a former member of the Offaly senior hurling team, with whom he usually lined out as a forward.

== Career ==
Murray first came to prominence at juvenile and underage levels with the Kilcormac–Killoughey club. He eventually joined the club's senior team and has since won three County Championship titles. Murray first appeared on the inter-county scene during a two-year stint with the Offaly minor team, before later lining out with the under-21 team. He joined the Offaly senior hurling team in 2019.

== Honours ==
Kilcormac–Killoughey

- Leinster Senior Club Hurling Championship (1): 2012
- Offaly Senior Hurling Championship (5): 2012, 2013, 2014, 2017, 2023
