= Offaly county hurling team =

Hurling team

Offaly
- Sport: Hurling
- Irish: Uíbh Fhailí
- Nickname(s): The Faithful County
- County board: Offaly GAA
- Manager: Johnny Kelly
- Home venue(s): Glenisk O'Connor Park, Tullamore; Grant Heating St Brendan's Park, Birr

Recent competitive record
- Current All-Ireland status: QF in 2026
- Last championship title: 1998
- Current NHL Division: 1A (7th in 2026; relegated to Division 1B)
First colours	Second colours

The Offaly county hurling team represents Offaly in hurling and is governed by Offaly GAA, the county board of the Gaelic Athletic Association. The team plays in the Leinster Senior Hurling Championship, part of the top tier of the All-Ireland Senior Hurling Championship. At senior level, the county have won four All-Ireland championships, nine Leinster championships and one National Hurling League title.

Offaly's home grounds are Glenisk O'Connor Park, Tullamore and Grant Heating St Brendan's Park, Birr. The team's manager is Johnny Kelly.

The team last won the Leinster Senior Hurling Championship in 1995, the All-Ireland Senior Hurling Championship in 1998 and the National Hurling League in 1991.

== History ==
After a scheme developed by the Gaelic Athletic Association in the 1970s to encourage the playing of hurling in non-traditional counties, Offaly was one of the first teams to benefit. As a result, the county won six Leinster Senior Hurling Championship (SHC) titles in the 1980s, as well as its first All-Ireland Senior Hurling Championship (SHC) in 1981.

The county has since gone on to win three other All-Ireland SHC titles. Perhaps Offaly's most famous win came in the 1994 All-Ireland SHC final, in what has come to be remembered as the "five minute final." Limerick looked set to win a first All-Ireland SHC title since 1973 until Offaly staged one of the greatest comebacks of all time, scoring two goals and five points in the last five minutes. They defeated Limerick by 3–16 to 2–13.

In the 1998 All-Ireland SHC semi-final, Offaly defeated the reigning title holder Clare in a second replay. Offaly had lost the first replay after referee Jimmy Cooney blew for full-time too early, leading Offaly fans to blockade the pitch in protest.

Offaly conceded a walkover to Kildare in the 2020 Christy Ring Cup after an outbreak of COVID-19 forced "almost every member" of the panel into isolation due to Health Service Executive (HSE) advice that they were "close contacts". Later in the same competition, in the semi-final, Down knocked Offaly out in a first ever inter-county hurling penalty shootout.

On 8 June 2024, at Croke Park in Dublin, Offaly defeated Laois by 2–23 to 0–26 in the Joe McDonagh Cup final. This was the team's first success in the competition, and earned Offaly promotion to the 2025 Leinster Senior Hurling Championship.

On 24 May 2026, Offaly qualified for the quarter-finals of the 2026 All-Ireland Senior Hurling Championship after finishing third in the 2026 Leinster Senior Hurling Championship. It's the first time since 2003 that Offaly have been in an All-Ireland quarter-final.

== Panel ==
Team as per Offaly vs Laois in the Joe McDonagh Cup final, 8 June 2024

No.	Player	Position	Club
1	Mark Troy	Goalkeeper	Durrow
2	Ben Conneely	Right corner-back	St Rynagh's
3	Ciarán Burke	Full-back	Durrow
4	Cathal King	Left corner-back	Carrig & Riverstown
5	David King	Right half-back	Coolderry
6	Cillian Keily	Centre-back	Kilcormac–Killoughey
7	Donal Shirley	Left half-back	Tubber
8	Jason Sampson (c)	Midfield	Shinrone
9	Eimhin Kelly	Midfield	Lusmagh
10	Killian Sampson	Right half-forward	Shinrone
11	Brian Duignan	Centre-forward	Durrow
12	Eoghan Cahill	Left half-forward	Birr
13	Dan Bourke	Right corner-forward	Durrow
14	Charlie Mitchell	Full-forward	Kilcormac–Killoughey
15	Adam Screeney	Left corner-forward	Kilcormac–Killoughey

No.	Player	Position	Club
16	Stephen Corcoran	Substitute	Coolderry
17	Oisín Kelly	Substitute	Belmont
18	Sam Bourke	Substitute	Durrow
19	Colin Spain	Substitute	Kilcormac–Killoughey
20	Jack Clancy	Substitute	Belmont
21	Ross Ravenhill	Substitute	Durrow
22	Padraig Cantwell	Substitute	Shamrocks
23	Dara Maher	Substitute	Shinrone
24	Luke Watkins	Substitute	Shinrone
25	James Nally	Substitute	Belmont
26	Kieran Connors	Substitute	Seir Kieran

^{INJ} Player has had an injury which has affected recent involvement with the county team.
^{RET} Player has since retired from the county team.
^{WD} Player has since withdrawn from the county team due to a non-injury issue.

== Management team ==
- Manager: Johnny Kelly, appointed head of the 2023 season
- Selectors: Barry Teehan (Coolderry)
- Performance coach: Brendan Maher (Borris-Ileigh, Tipperary)
- Goalkeeping coach: Colm Callanan (Kinvara, Galway)
- Strength and Conditioning Coach: Brian Roache
- Other backroom: Martin Maher (Brendan's brother)

== Managerial history ==
Offaly have a history of appointing "foreign" managers. In 2016, the former Waterford hurler Kevin Ryan became Offaly's ninth "foreign" manager in a quarter of a century.

Andy Gallagher 1976–1983

Dermot Healy 1983–1986

Georgie Leahy 1986–1988

P. J. Whelahan 1988–1989

Paudge Mulhare 1989–1990

Pádraig Horan 1990–1992

Éamonn Cregan 1992–1996

John McIntyre 1996–1997

Babs Keating 1997–1998

Michael Bond 1998–1999

Pat Fleury 1999–2000

Michael Bond (2) 2000–2001

Tom Fogarty 2001–2002

Mike McNamara 2002–2004

John McIntyre (2) 2004–2007

Joe Dooley 2007–2011

Ollie Baker 2011–2013

Brian Whelahan 2013–2015

Éamonn Kelly 2015–2016

Kevin Ryan 2016–2017

Kevin Martin 2017–2019

Joachim Kelly 2019**

Michael Fennelly 2019–2022

Johnny Kelly 2022–present

**=In a caretaker role

== Players ==
=== Notable players ===
- David Franks

== Colours and crest ==
=== Kit evolution ===
Before the beginning of the 2024 season Offaly revealed a new home jersey, which featured a crew neck with ribbing and the inscription Eslo Fidelis (Latin for "Be Faithful") on its lower back.

=== Team sponsorship ===
The food company Carroll's of Tullamore sponsored Offaly since the GAA first permitted shirt sponsorship deals in 1991 until 2021. It was the sport's longest running shirt sponsor. In 2022, Glenisk became the County's Camogie, Football and Hurling sponsors, with them becoming the Ladies Football sponsors in 2023 once their current sponsorship with CMG closes.

Professional golfer Shane Lowry and Offaly announced a five-year partnership in April 2021.

Period	Kit manufacturer	Shirt sponsor
1991–2021	O'Neills	Carroll's of Tullamore
2022–	O'Neills	Glenisk

== Honours ==
=== National ===
- All-Ireland Senior Hurling Championship
  - (gold) Winners (4): 1981, 1985, 1994, 1998
  - (silver) Runners-up (3): 1984, 1995, 2000
- Joe McDonagh Cup
  - (gold) Winners (1): 2024
  - (silver) Runners-up (1): 2023
- Christy Ring Cup
  - (gold) Winners (1): 2021
- All-Ireland Junior Hurling Championship
  - (gold) Winners (2): 1923, 1929
  - (silver) Runners-up (1): 1915
- All-Ireland Under-20 Hurling Championship
  - (gold) Winners (1): 2024
  - (silver) Runners-up (4): 1989, 1991, 1992, 2023
- National Hurling League
  - (gold) Winners (1): 1991
  - (silver) Runners-up (2): 1980–81, 1987–88
- National Hurling League Division 2
  - (gold) Winners (4): 1966, 1988, 2005, 2009
- National Hurling League Division 2A
  - (gold) Winners (1): 2021, 2023
- All-Ireland Minor Hurling Championship
  - (gold) Winners (3): 1986, 1987, 1989
  - (silver) Runners-up (1): 2022

=== Provincial ===
- Leinster Senior Hurling Championship
  - (gold) Winners (9): 1980, 1981, 1984, 1985, 1988, 1989, 1990, 1994, 1995
  - (silver) Runners-up (14): 1901, 1924, 1926, 1928, 1969, 1982, 1983, 1986, 1987, 1996, 1998, 1999, 2000, 2004
- Leinster Junior Hurling Championship
  - (gold) Winners (7): 1915, 1922, 1923, 1924, 1929, 1938, 1953
  - (silver) Runners-up (4): 1908, 1912, 1937, 1959
- Leinster Under-21/Under-20 Hurling Championship
  - (gold) Winners (7): 1978, 1989, 1991, 1992, 2000, 2023, 2024
  - (silver) Runners-up (13): 1967, 1972, 1973, 1982, 1986, 1987, 1988, 1996, 1997, 1999, 2007, 2008, 2016
- Leinster Minor Hurling Championship
  - (gold) Winners (5): 1986, 1987, 1989, 2000, 2022
  - (silver) Runners-up (10): 1948, 1950, 1957, 1982, 1988, 1994, 1995, 1997, 2003, 2020
- Walsh Cup
  - (gold) Winners (5): 1977, 1981, 1990, 1993, 1994
  - (silver) Runners-up (5): 1966, 1974, 1987, 1995, 2008
- Walsh Cup Shield
  - (gold) Winners (2): 2011, 2012
  - (silver) Runners-up (1): 2009
- Kehoe Cup
  - (gold) Winners (1): 2020
