= Shinrone GAA =

Gaelic games club in County Offaly, Ireland

Shinrone
- Suí an Róin
- County: Offaly
- Nickname: The village
- Colours: Red and white
- Grounds: St Mary’s Field
- Coordinates: 52°59′12″N 7°55′30″W

Playing kits
Standard colours

Senior Club Championships
	All Ireland	Leinster champions	Offaly champions
Hurling:	0	0	1

Shinrone GAA Club is a Gaelic Athletic Association club in Shinrone, County Offaly, Ireland. The club is almost exclusively concerned with the game of hurling.

== History ==
Located in the village of Shinrone, on the Offaly-Tipperary border, Shinrone GAA Club was one of the first seventy clubs affiliated to Central Council after the foundation of the GAA in 1884. Hurling and Gaelic football had been played in the area prior to this.

The club has spent most of its existence operating in the junior grade and are the all-time record-holders, having won nine Offaly JHC titles over a 100-year period. Shinrone have also won four Offaly IHC titles at various intervals.

Shinrone qualified for their very first Offaly SHC final in 1960, however, they lost to Drumcullen by a point. The club claimed their inaugural Offaly SHC after a 0–26 to 2–13 win over Kilcormac–Killoughey in 2022.

== Honours ==
- Offaly Senior Hurling Championship (1): 2022
- Offaly Intermediate Hurling Championship (4): 1932, 1957, 1991, 2020
- Offaly Junior A Hurling Championship (9): 1919, 1924, 1951, 1968, 1976, 2003, 2009, 2012, 2018,
- Offaly Minor A Hurling Championship (4) 1951, 1959, 2013, 2023 (Shinrone/BK)
- Offaly Under-21 A Hurling Championship (7): 1960, 1961, 1977 (St Mary’s) 1978, 2013, 2014, 2016
- Offaly Under-16 A Hurling Championship (4) 1936, 1954, 2008, 2017
- Community Games All Ireland Gold (1): 2012
- Offaly Under-14 A Hurling Championship (5): 1993, 2004, 2010, 2014, 2015
- Offaly Under-12 A Championship (1): 2019
- Offaly Under-13 A Hurling Championship (1): 2019 (St Mary’s)

== Notable players ==
- Brendan Keeshan: All-Ireland SHC-winner (1981, 1985)
