= Ballinamere GAA =

Irish Gaelic Athletic Association club

Ballinamere
- Baile na Maor
- County: Offaly
- Colours: Green and yellow
- Grounds: Ballykilmurry

Playing kits
Standard colours

Ballinamere GAA is a Gaelic Athletic Association club in Ballykilmurry, County Offaly, Ireland. The club, having previously fielded teams in both codes, is now primarily concerned with the game of hurling.

Today, facilities include two pitches, a gym, and a fully-lit walking track. The club's main sponsor is Molloy Precast & Environmental Systems.

== History ==
Located in the townland of Ballykilmurry just outside Tullamore, Ballinamere GAA Club was founded in the 1880s. Hurling was the favoured sport in the early years, with the club reaching the 1908 Offaly SHC final only to be beaten by Drumcullen. The Parish Rule, War of Independence and Civil War lead to a period of inactivity before the club underwent a revival in 1930.

The 1940s and 1950s saw the club have its most successful period, with Ballinamere claiming three Offaly JHC titles and two Offaly IHC titles. The club added another JHC titles to its list of honours in 1980, before winning the Offaly JFC title in 1983. It was around this time that Ballinamere and the nearby Durrow joined forces at underage level. This resulted in an amalgamation at adult level in 2006, with Ballinamere focusing on hurling and Durrow concentrating on football. Ballinamere claimed provincial honours in 2013 when a 2-08 to 0-13 defeat of Lisdowney secured the Leinster Club JHC title.

== Honours ==
- Offaly Intermediate Hurling Championship (3): 1945, 1953, 2013
- Leinster Junior Club Hurling Championship (1): 2013
- Offaly Junior A Hurling Championship (5): 1944, 1950, 1959, 1980, 2010
- Offaly Junior A Football Championship (2): 1983, 1998

== Notable players ==
- Dan Bourke: Joe McDonagh Cup-winner (2024)
- Sam Bourke: Joe McDonagh Cup-winner (2024)
- Ciarán Burke: Joe McDonagh Cup-winner (2024)
- Brian Duignan: Joe McDonagh Cup-winner (2024)
- John Murphy: Christy Ring Cup-winner (2021)
- Dan Ravenhill: Joe McDonagh Cup-winner (2024)
- Mark Troy: Joe McDonagh Cup-winner (2024)
