= Ferbane GAA =

GAA club in Offaly, Ireland

Ferbane/Belmont
- Féar Bán/Lios Dearg
- County: Offaly
- Colours: Green and White
- Grounds: Ferbane GAA Grounds; Moystown GAA Grounds
- Coordinates: 53°16′09.87″N 7°49′09.22″W

Playing kits
Standard colours

Senior Club Championships
	All Ireland	Leinster champions	Offaly champions
Football:	-	1	12

Ferbane/Belmont GAA is a football club in the Gaelic Athletic Association located in Ferbane in County Offaly, Ireland, 13 miles from Birr. The Ferbane GAA field is located in the town of Ferbane on the Ballycumber Road. Ferbane play in the Offaly championship.

Ferbane holds the record for the club with the longest continuous sponsorship deal in Gaelic football.

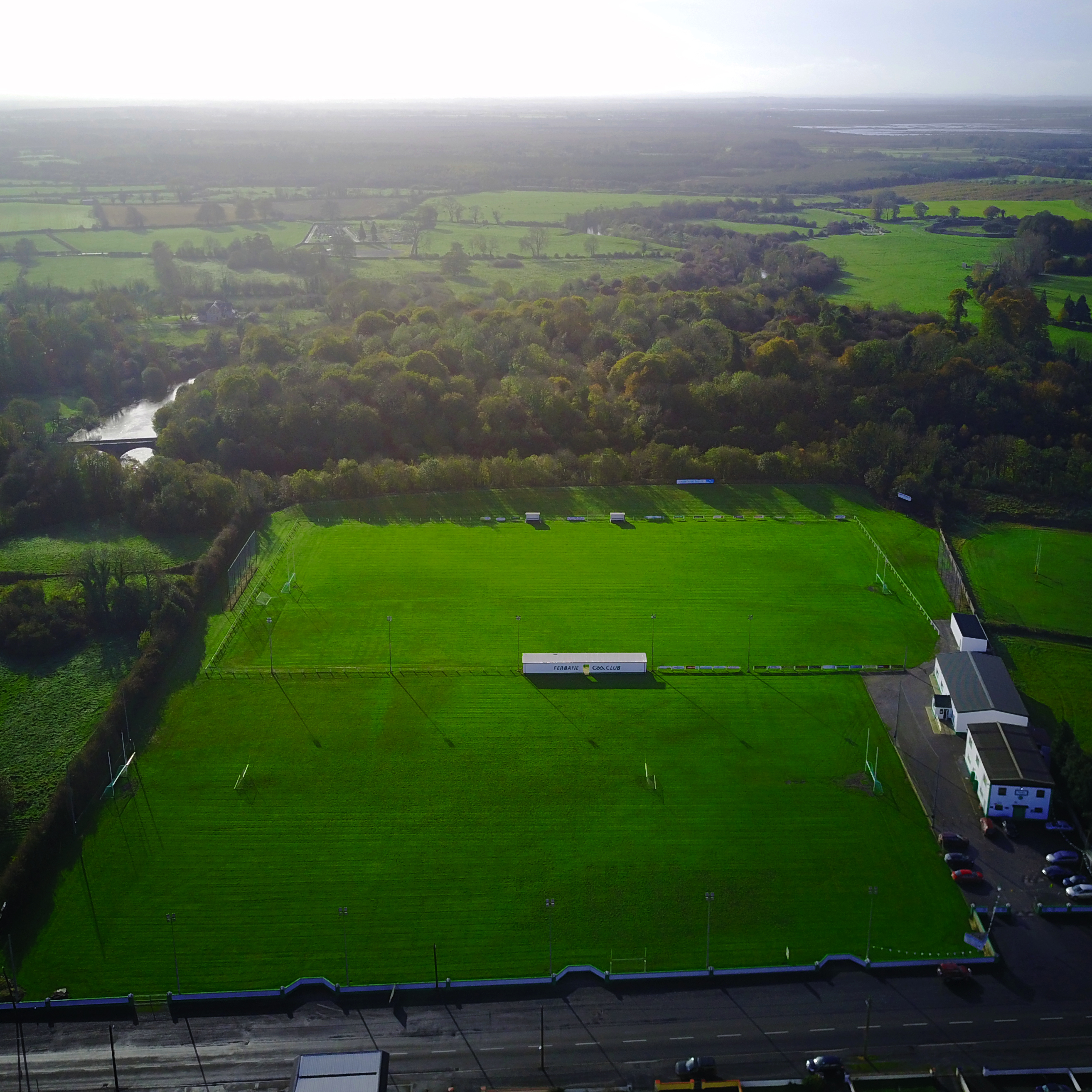
Ferbane GAA Pitch From Above (2017)

== Honours ==
=== Football ===
Ferbane enjoyed most of their success in the '80s and start of '90s where they won a 5 in a row of Offaly Senior Football Championship titles from 1986–90 and also a Leinster Senior Club Football Championship title in 1986 beating Portlaoise. Gallen community school also brought the senior all-Ireland vocational schools title to Ferbane where they beat Clonakilty cc in Croke Park. all Ireland runners up 2012. More recently Gallen community school have won the 2016 post primary schools B football title beating Mountbellew in the final. In 2019 the club bridged a 25-year gap by defeating Rhode in the County Senior Football Final by 2-13 to 0-14. Seán Dempsey was manager.

- Leinster Senior Club Football Championships: (1)
  - 1986
- Offaly Senior Football Championships: (12)
  - 1914, 1971, 1974, 1976, 1986, 1987, 1988, 1989, 1990, 1992, 1994, 2019
- Offaly Intermediate Football Championships: (3)
  - 1957, 1959, 1996,2018
- Offaly Junior Football Championships: (5)
  - 1924, 1952, 1964, 1995, 2016

=== Belmont Football Titles ===
- Offaly Intermediate Football Championships: (2)
  - 1951, 1993
- Offaly Junior Football Championships: (3)
  - 1923, 1950, 1985

=== Hurling ===
U21 County title in 2003 (vs Drumcullen in Páirc Naomh Raonagh in Banagher)

Intermediate County Title in 2004 (vs Kilcormac/Kiloughey in Páirc Naomh Raonagh in Banagher)

Minor A runners up in 2015 vs Na Fianna

- Offaly Intermediate Hurling Championships: (1)
  - 2004
- Offaly Junior A Hurling Championships: (4)
  - 1952, 1957, 1997, 2017

=== Ferbane hurling titles ===
- Offaly Junior A Hurling Championships: (1)
  - 1989

== Hurling ==
The Hurling club in the Ferbane Parish is known as Belmont. Named after the village of Belmont which is the Hurling stronghold of the Ferbane Parish
