= Kilcormac–Killoughey GAA =

Gaelic sports club in County Offaly, Ireland

Kilcormac–Killoughey
- Cill Chormaic–Cill Achaidh
- Founded: 1986
- County: Offaly
- Nickname: KK
- Colours: Green and yellow
- Grounds: Kilcormac GAA Grounds
- Coordinates: 53°10′38″N 7°43′58″W

Playing kits
Standard colours

Senior Club Championships
	All Ireland	Leinster champions	Offaly champions
Hurling:	0	1	7

Kilcormac–Killoughey GAA is a Gaelic Athletic Association club in Kilcormac, County Offaly, Ireland. The club fields teams in both hurling and Gaelic football.

== History ==
Gaelic games have been played in the Kilcormac area since the St Cormacs club, often referred to as Frankford, was affiliated to the Gaelic Athletic Association in 1887. The Kilcormac club first joined with Killoughey in 1970 and were known collectively as Na Piarsaigh. The adult section of the Na Piarsaigh club separated in 1981 but they remained together at underage level. They rejoined at all levels in 1986 when the Kilcormac–Killoughey GAA Club was formed.

Kilcormac–Killoughey had its first success four years later in 1990 when the club won the Offaly JAHC title. The club claimed an Offaly IHC title in 2006, while JAFC and IFC titles were also claimed during this period. Kilcormac–Killoughey claimed the first of three successive Offaly SHC titles in 2012. This was immediately followed by a Leinster Club SHC title before defeat by St Thomas' in the 2013 All-Ireland club final.

== Honours ==
- Leinster Senior Club Hurling Championship (1): 2012
- Offaly Senior Hurling Championship (6): 2012, 2013, 2014, 2017, 2023, 2024, 2025
- Offaly Senior B Hurling Championship (2): 2023, 2024
- Offaly Intermediate Hurling Championship (2): 2006, 2018
- Offaly Intermediate Football Championship (2): 1998, 2013
- Offaly Junior A Hurling Championship (2): 1990, 1999
- Offaly Junior A Football Championship (4): 2002, 2006, 2012, 2023
- Offaly Under-21 Hurling Championship (5): 1994, 1995, 1996, 1997, 1998
- Offaly Under-20 Hurling Championship (5): 2020, 2021, 2022, 2023, 2024
- Offaly Minor A Hurling Championship (1): 2012

== Notable players ==
- Stephen Byrne
- Colm Cassidy
- Dan Currams
- Liam Currams
- Cathal Kiely
- Noel Mitchell
- Dylan Murray
- Danny Owens
- Jack Screeney
- Ciarán Slevin
- Mick Spain
- Adam Screeney
