= Clodiagh Gaels GAA =

GAA club in County Offaly, Ireland

Clodiagh Gaels
- Gaeil na Clóidí
- Founded: 2015
- County: Offaly
- Colours: Blue and white
- Grounds: Clodiagh Gaels GAA Grounds
- Coordinates: 53°12′55″N 7°26′49″W

Playing kits
Standard colours

Clodiagh Gaels (/ˈkloʊdiə ˈɡeɪlz/, CLOE-dee-uh) is a Gaelic Athletic Association club located in Killeigh, County Offaly, Ireland. The club fields teams in both hurling and Gaelic football.

== History ==
Located in the village of Killeigh, on the Laois-Offaly border, Clodiagh Gaels GAA Club was founded in 2015 following an amalgamation between the clubs representing Killeigh and Killurin; it is named for the Clodiagh River. Both clubs had already united at juvenile and underage levels as Na Fianna, however, dwindling player numbers forced the clubs to join up at adult level. The new club initially operated at intermediate level in hurling and at junior level in football. Success was immediate, with Clodiagh Gaels winning an Offaly IHC and JAHC double in 2016. The club achieved top flight status after winning the Offaly SBHC title in 2021 and in 2026.

== Honours ==
See below:

- Offaly Senior B Hurling Championship (2): 2021, 2026
- Offaly Intermediate Hurling Championship (1): 2016
- Offaly Junior A Hurling Championship (1): 2016
- Offaly Junior A Football Championship (1): 2018
- Offaly Junior C Football Championship (1): 2020

== Notable players ==
- Liam Langton: Christy Ring Cup-winner (2021)
