= Tullamore GAA =

Gaelic games club in County Offaly, Ireland

Tullamore
- An Tulach Mhór
- Founded: 1888
- County: Offaly
- Colours
- Grounds: O'Brien Park
- Coordinates: 53°16′48.84″N 7°29′36.90″W

Playing kits
Standard colours

Senior Club Championships
	All Ireland	Leinster champions	Offaly champions
Football:	0	0	32
Hurling:	0	0	10

Tullamore GAA is a Gaelic Athletic Association club located in the town of Tullamore, County Offaly, Ireland. The club is concerned with both hurling and Gaelic football and competes in Offaly GAA competitions.

== Honours ==
- Offaly Senior Football Championship (32): 1896, 1897, 1898, 1899, 1908, 1911, 1912, 1913, 1917, 1924, 1925, 1926, 1930, 1932, 1935, 1941, 1946, 1948, 1954, 1956, 1963, 1973, 1977, 2000, 2002, 2007, 2013, 2021, 2023, 2024, 2025, 2026
- Offaly Senior Hurling Championship (10): 1909, 1932, 1934, 1935, 1936, 1937, 1955, 1959, 1964, 2009
- Offaly Senior B Hurling Championship (1): 2022
- Offaly Intermediate Football Championship (3): 1953, 1999, 2004
- Offaly Intermediate Hurling Championship (3): 1929, 1933, 1989
- Offaly Junior A Football Championship (8): 1907, 1930, 1942, 1949, 1972, 1984, 1993, 2013
- Offaly Junior A Hurling Championship (2): 1925, 1930

== Notable players ==
- Shane Dooley
- Martin Furlong
- Martin Heffernan
- Kevin Martin
