= Clara GAA (Offaly) =

Gaelic games club in County Offaly, Ireland

Clara
- An Clárach
- Founded: 1884
- County: Offaly
- Colours: White and Black

Playing kits
Standard colours

Senior Club Championships
	All Ireland	Leinster champions	Offaly champions
Football:	0	0	6

Clara GAA is a GAA club based in Clara, County Offaly, Ireland. It participates in competitions organized by the Offaly GAA county board. The club fields both Gaelic football and Hurling teams.

== History ==
The club was founded in 1884 and is the oldest GAA club in Offaly. Clara was the first club outside of Dublin to affiliate to the newly-formed GAA, joining with eighty members.

== Achievements ==
- Offaly Senior Football Championship Winners (6) 1960, 1964, 1991, 1993, 2003, 2009
  - Runners-Up 1923, 1957, 1958, 1966, 1981, 1987, 1995, 2006, 2010, 2011, 2012, 2017
- Offaly Senior B Football Championship Winners 2025
- Offaly Intermediate Football Championship Winners (1) 1956
- Offaly Intermediate Hurling Championship Winners (3) 1934, 2003, 2019
- Offaly Junior Football Championship Winners (6) 1911, 1919, 1928, 1954, 1999, 2007
- Offaly Junior A Hurling Championship Winners (6) 1920, 1926, 1941, 1983, 1996, 2015
- Leinster Special Junior Hurling Championship Winners (1) 2014

== Notable players ==
- Brian Cowen
- Peter Nolan
