= Lusmagh GAA =

GAA club in County Offaly

Lusmagh
- Lusmá
- County: Offaly
- Nickname: The Reds
- Colours
- Grounds: Lusmagh Grounds
- Coordinates: 53°10′21″N 8°01′05″W

Playing kits
Standard colours

Senior Club Championships
	All Ireland	Leinster champions	Offaly champions
Hurling:	0	0	1

Lusmagh GAA is a Gaelic Athletic Association club in Lusmagh, County Offaly, Ireland. The club is almost exclusively concerned with the game of hurling.

== History ==
Lusmagh GAA Club is located in the parish of Lusmagh, just outside the town of Banagher, County Offaly. The club has spent most of its existence operating in the junior grade. Lusmagh had its first major success in 1973, when the club won the Offaly JAHC title to secure senior status for the first time.

Lusmagh won the club's first, and only, Offaly SHC title in 1989, following a 1–11 to 1–10 win over reigning champions Seir Kieran in the final. The club subsequently slipped down the various grades, however, Offaly IHC titles were won in 2012 and 2015. Lusmagh won the Offaly SBHC title in 2025.

== Honours ==
- Offaly Senior Hurling Championship (1): 1989
- Offaly Senior B Hurling Championship (1): 2025
- Offaly Intermediate Hurling Championship (2): 2012, 2015
- Offaly Junior A Hurling Championship (1): 1973

== Notable players ==
- Joachim Kelly: All-Ireland SHC-winner (1981, 1985)
- Jim Troy: All-Ireland SHC-winner (1985, 1994)
- John Troy: All-Ireland SHC-winner (1994, 1998)
