= Shamrocks GAA (Offaly) =

GAA club in County Offaly

Shamrocks
- Na Seamróga
- Founded: 1994
- County: Offaly
- Colours: Blue, red and green
- Grounds: The Mill Field

Playing kits
Standard colours

Senior Club Championships
| | All Ireland | Leinster champions | Offaly champions |
|---|---|---|---|
| Football: | 0 | 0 | 0 |
| Hurling: | 0 | 0 | 0 |

Shamrocks GAA is a Gaelic Athletic Association club located in Mucklagh/Rahan/The Island, County Offaly, Ireland. The club fields teams in both hurling and Gaelic football.

== History ==
Located in the parish of Rahan, on the Tullamore-Birr road, Shamrocks GAA Club was founded on 24 March 1992 following an amalgamation of the St. Carthage's and Mucklagh clubs. It followed on from the formation of a Shamrocks underage club in 1992.

Shamrocks enjoyed a successful season in 2000, winning the Offaly U21AFC title as well as the first of three Offaly IHC titles. Further successes were achieved in 2014 and 2022. Shamrocks have also appeared in three Offaly SFC finals in 2000, 2005 and 2007, but have failed to secure the title. The club won the Offaly SBFC title in 2018.

== Honours ==
- Offaly Senior B Football Championship (1): 2018
- Offaly Intermediate Hurling Championship (3): 2000, 2014, 2022, 2026
- Offaly Junior B Football Championship (2): 2007 2025
- Offaly Under 21A Football Championship (1): 2000
- Offaly Junior B Hurling Championship (1): 2012
- Offaly Junior C Football Championship (1) 2026

== Notable players ==
- Neville Coughlan: Offaly senior footballer
- Nigel Dunne - Offaly Senior footballer
- Derek Molloy: Offaly senior hurler
