= Carrig & Riverstown GAA =

GAA club in County Offaly

St Rynaghs
- Naomh Raghnach
- Founded: 1933
- County: Offaly
- Colours: Blue and white
- Grounds: Páirc na Carraige & Baile Uí Lachnáin

Playing kits
Standard colours

Carrig & Riverstown GAA is a Gaelic Athletic Association club located near Birr, County Offaly, Ireland. The club is primarily concerned with the game of hurling.

== History ==
Located outside Birr, County Offaly, Carrig & Riverstown GAA Club is geographically located in County Tipperary. The club was founded in 1933 and had always been affiliated to the Offaly County Board. The club has spent most of its existence operating in the junior grade, winning their first two Offaly JHC titles in 1946 and 1955. This was followed by an Offaly IHC title in 1958 and senior status for the first time. Further JHC titles were won in 1971, 1979 and 1995 before winning two more IHC titles in 1996 and 2023.

== Honours ==
- Offaly Intermediate Hurling Championship (3): 1958, 1996, 2023
- Offaly Junior A Hurling Championship (5): 1946, 1955, 1971, 1979, 1995
- Offaly Junior B Hurling Championship (1): 2021
- Offaly Minor Hurling Championship (1): 1956

== Notable players ==
- Ger Oakley: All-Ireland SHC-winner (1998)
