= Offaly Intermediate Hurling Championship =

Annual hurling competition

- Current season or competition: 2026 Offaly Intermediate Hurling Championship
- Irish: Craobh Iomána Idirmhéanach Uíbh Fháilí
- Code: Hurling
- Founded: 1929
- Trophy: Fr Carey Cup
- Title holders: Shamrocks (4th title)
- First winner: Tullamore
- Most titles: Coolderry, (6 titles)
- Sponsors: Molloy Environmental Systems

The Offaly Intermediate Hurling Championship is an annual hurling competition contested by mid-tier Offaly GAA clubs. The Offaly County Board of the Gaelic Athletic Association has organised it since 1929.

== History ==
The intermediate championship dates back to 1929. It was the third hurling championship to be established in Offaly, and was seen as a stepping stone between the senior and junior hurling championships.

Over the years the championship proved difficult to sustain. There were no finals in 1940 and 1941, while the 1949 decider was declared void. In 1959 the championship was suspended, however, it was revived in 1963, only to be suspended again until 1978. It has remained a staple of the hurling calendar since then, however, it has undergone some major changes. Originally played as a straight knock-out championship, the competition was eventually expanded to feature a group stage which provided more games.

== Format ==
The series of games are played during the summer and autumn months. The championship includes a group stage which is followed by a knock-out phase for the top teams.

Eight clubs currently participate in the Intermediate Championship.

== Qualification for subsequent competitions ==
At the end of the championship, the winning team qualify to the subsequent Leinster Junior Club Hurling Championship.

== Teams ==
=== 2026 Teams ===
The 8 teams competing in the 2026 Offaly Intermediate Hurling Championship are:

Team	Location	Colours	Championship titles	Last championship title
Ballinamere	Ballykimurray	Green and yellow	4	2017
Birr	Birr	Green and red	5	2021
Brosna Gaels	Ballycumber	Blue, white and gold	2	2011
Coolderry	Coolderry	Green and white	6	2024
Seir Kieran	Clareen	Black and amber	4	1947
Shamrocks	Mucklagh	Blue, red and green	3	2022
Shinrone	Shinrone	Red and white	4	2020
St Rynagh's	Cloghan and Banagher	Blue and gold	4	1993

== Honours ==
The trophy presented to the winners is the Fr Carey Cup.

There is promotion and relegation involving the Offaly Senior Hurling Championship and the Offaly Junior A Hurling Championship.

The Offaly Intermediate Hurling Championship is an integral part of the wider Leinster Junior Club Hurling Championship. The winners of the Offaly county final join the champions of the other hurling counties to contest the provincial championship. They often do well there, mar shampla, Ballinamere won the 2013 Leinster title after winning the Offaly Intermediate Hurling Championship. While Shamrocks and Lusmagh were in Leinster finals in 2014 and 2016 respectively, after winning the 2014 and 2015 Offaly Intermediate Hurling Championships.

== List of finals ==
=== List of Offaly IHC finals ===
Year	Winners		Runners-up		Venue
Year	Club	Score	Club	Score	Venue
2026	Shamrocks	3-25	Seir Kieran	2-09	St Brendan's Park
2025	Drumcullen	0-16 2-18 (r)	Birr	1-13 0-14 (r)	
2024	Coolderry	3-12	Drumcullen	1-12	
2023	Carrig & Riverstown	1-20	Coolderry	2-11	O'Connor Park
2022	Shamrocks	1–12, 4-24 (r)	Seir Kieran	2-09, 0-09 (r)	O'Connor Park, St Brendan's Park (r)
2021	Birr	0-16	Shamrocks	1-12	
2020	Shinrone	1-14	Coolderry	1-12	O'Connor Park
2019	Clara		Seir Kieran		
2018	Kilcormac–Killoughey	2-16	St Rynagh's	0-11	
2017	Ballinamere	0-16	Brosna Gaels	2-05	
2016	Clodiagh Gaels	1-21	Carrig & Riverstown	1-09	
2015	Lusmagh		Clodiagh Gaels		
2014	Shamrocks	0-22	St Rynagh's	1-06	O'Connor Park
2013	Ballinamere	2-19	Kilcormac–Killoughey	1-14	O'Connor Park
2012	Lusmagh	4-11	St Rynagh's	2-14	O'Connor Park
2011	Brosna Gaels	0-13	St Rynagh's	0-8	O'Connor Park
2010	Drumcullen	0-12	St Rynagh's	1-06	O'Connor Park
2009	Brosna Gaels	2-15	Birr	1-14	O'Connor Park
2008	Ballyskenagh	0-12	Birr	0-09	Shinrone GAA Grounds
2007	Birr		Ballinamere		
2006	Kilcormac–Killoughey	2-10	Birr	1-11	
2005	Coolderry	3-04	St Rynagh's	0-07	
2004	Belmont	0-21	Kilcormac–Killoughey	1-04	
2003	Clara	0-15	Coolderry	2-06	
2002	Killavilla	W/O	Coolderry	Scr.	
2001	Coolderry	2-09	St Rynagh's	1-10	
2000	Shamrocks	0-09	Coolderry	2-01	
1999	Birr	2-12	Shamrocks	1-07	
1998	Birr	1-16	Ballinamere	0-06	
1997	Birr	2-16	Ballinamere	1-09	
1996	Carrig & Riverstown	1-10	Ballinamere	1-09	
1995	Ballyskenagh	2-11	Killeigh/Raheen	0-10	
1994	St. Carthrage's/Mucklagh	1-08	Ballinamere	0-09	
1993	St Rynagh's	2-07	St. Carthrage's	1-07	
1992	St Rynagh's	2-08	St. Carthrage's	1-06	
1991	Shinrone	1-13	Kilcormac–Killoughey	0-11	
1990	Ferbane		Birr		
1989	Tullamore	2-15	Kinnitty	0-08	Kilcormac
1988	Coolderry	5-07	St. Carthrage's	1-06	
1987	St Rynagh's	2-07	St. Carthrage's	1-09	
1986	Coolderry	2-09	St. Carthrage's	0-06	
1985	Coolderry		St Rynagh's		
1984	Killoughey	1-15	St Rynagh's	0-06	
1983	St Saran's	2-04	Killoughey	1-04	
1982	Kilcormac	1-14	St Rynagh's	0-04	
1981	Killeigh	1-07	Kilcormac	0-07	
1980	Killoughey	2-07	Kilcormac	2-05	
1979	Ballyskenagh	1-13	Killoughey	1-08	
1978	St Rynagh's	4-07	Drumcullen	3-06	
1964–1977	No competition				
1963	Edenderry	5-07	Ballinamere	3-06	
1959–1962	No competition				
1958	Carrig & Riverstown	3-09	Belmont	1-00	
1957	Shinrone	6-06	Kilcormac	2-02	
1956	St Flannan's		Ferbane		
1955	Killeigh		Shinrone		
1954	Edenderry		Shinrone		
1953	Ballinamere		Belmont		
1952	Rahan		Shinrone		
1951	White Rovers		Ballinamere		
1950	Killeigh		Rahan		
1949	Final declared void				
1948	Killoughey		Shannon Rovers		
1947	Seir Kieran		Carrig & Riverstown		
1946	Cloghan		Shinrone		
1945	Ballinamere		Eglish		
1944	Banagher		Cloghan		
1943	Seir Kieran		Clara		
1942	Killeigh				
1941	Final not played				
1940	Final not played				
1939	Eglish		Birr		
1938	Seir Kieran		Birr		
1937	Kilcolman		Carrig & Riverstown		
1936	Banagher		Kilcolman		
1935	Edenderry		Drumcullen		
1934	Clara		Edenderry		
1933	Tullamore		Clara		
1932	Shinrone		Tullamore		
1931	Seir Kieran	5-07	Clara	2-05	
1930	Rahan	w/o	Mt. Heaton	Scr.	
1929	Tullamore	5-03	Killoughey	0-00	

=== Notes ===
- 1949 Rahan defeated Drumcullen 4–05 to 5-02

== Championships ==
=== By club ===
#	Club	Titles	Championship wins
1	Coolderry	6	1985, 1986, 1988, 2001, 2005, 2024
2	Birr	5	1997, 1998, 1999, 2007, 2021
3	Seir Kieran	4	1931, 1938, 1943, 1947
3	Killeigh	4	1942, 1950, 1955, 1981
3	St Rynagh's	4	1978, 1987, 1992, 1993
3	Ballinamere	4	1945, 1953, 2013, 2017
3	Shinrone	4	1932, 1957, 1991, 2020
3	Shamrocks	4	2000, 2014, 2022, 2026
9	Edenderry	3	1935, 1954, 1963
9	Killoughey	3	1948, 1980, 1984
9	Tullamore	3	1929, 1933, 1989
9	Ballyskenagh	3	1979, 1995, 2008
9	Clara	3	1934, 2003, 2019
9	Carrig & Riverstown	3	1958, 1996, 2023
15	Banagher	2	1936, 1944
15	Rahan	2	1930, 1952
15	Brosna Gaels	2	2009, 2011
15	Lusmagh	2	2012, 2015
15	Kilcormac–Killoughey	2	2006, 2018
15	Drumcullen	2	2010, 2025
21	Kilcolman	1	1937
21	Eglish	1	1939
21	Cloghan	1	1946
21	White Rovers	1	1951
21	St Flannan's	1	1956
21	Kilcormac	1	1982
21	St Saran's	1	1983
21	Ferbane	1	1990
21	St Carthage's/Mucklagh	1	1994
21	Killavilla	1	2002
21	Belmont	1	2004
21	Clodiagh Gaels	1	2016

== See also ==
- Offaly Senior Hurling Championship (Tier 1)
- Offaly Senior B Hurling Championship (Tier 2)
- Offaly Junior A Hurling Championship (Tier 4)
