= Drumcullen GAA =

GAA club in County Offaly

Drumcullen
- Druim-cuilean
- Founded: 1890
- County: Offaly
- Colours: Blue and red
- Grounds: Drumcullen GAA Club
- Coordinates: 53°08′00″N 7°48′15″W

Playing kits
Standard colours

Senior Club Championships
| | All Ireland | Leinster champions | Offaly champions |
|---|---|---|---|
| Hurling: | 0 | 0 | 17 |

Drumcullen GAA is a Gaelic Athletic Association club located in the townland of Drumcullen, County Offaly, Ireland, to the south of Rath. The club is almost exclusively concerned with the game of hurling.

== Honours ==
- Offaly Senior Hurling Championship (17): 1908, 1918, 1919, 1924, 1925, 1927, 1928, 1929, 1933, 1941, 1950, 1951, 1952, 1954, 1957, 1958, 1960
- Offaly Intermediate Hurling Championship (2): 2010, 2025
- Offaly Junior A Hurling Championship (6) 1915, 1932, 1943, 1972, 1974, 2005

== Notable players ==
- Pat Fleury
- Conor Gath
- Paddy Molloy
