= 2024 Joe McDonagh Cup =

Joe McDonagh Cup

- Dates: 20 April - 8 June 2024
- Teams: 6
- Champions: Offaly (1st title); Jason Sampson (captain); Johnny Kelly (manager)
- Runners-up: Laois; Aaron Dunphy (captain); William Maher (manager)
- Relegated: Meath

Tournament statistics
- Matches played: 16
- Goals scored: 57 (3.56 per match)
- Points scored: 680 (42.5 per match)
- Top scorer(s): Brian Duignan (3-37); Killian Doyle (1-43)

The 2024 Joe McDonagh Cup was the seventh edition of the Joe McDonagh Cup since its establishment by the Gaelic Athletic Association in 2018 and is the second-tier of Hurling for senior county teams (the All-Ireland Senior Hurling Championship is the first-tier trophy). It is contested by six GAA county teams ranked 12–17 in the 2024 All-Ireland Senior Hurling Championship. The fixtures were announced on 13 April 2018. The competition began on 5 May 2018. The competition ran from 20 April to 8 June 2024.

The Joe McDonagh Cup final was played on 8 June 2024 at Croke Park in Dublin, between Offaly and Laois, in what was their first ever meeting in the final. Offaly won the match by 2–23 to 0–26 to claim their first ever cup title.

Offaly's Brian Duignan and Westmeath's Killian Doyle were the joint-top scorers.

== Team changes ==
=== To championship ===
Relegated from the Leinster Senior Hurling Championship

- Westmeath

Promoted from the Christy Ring Cup

- Meath

=== From championship ===
Promoted to the All-Ireland Senior Hurling Championship

- Carlow

Relegated to the Christy Ring Cup

- Kildare

== Format ==
=== Cup format ===
Initially each of the six teams play the other five teams in single round-robin matches. The top two teams after the round robin games compete in the Joe McDonagh Cup final. The Joe McDonagh Cup champions and runners-up also advance to the All-Ireland preliminary quarter-finals with the Joe McDonagh Cup teams having home advantage.

==== Promotion ====
If the Joe McDonagh champions are a non-Munster team, they are automatically promoted to the following year's Leinster Championship. If the champions are a Munster team, they are automatically promoted to the following year's Munster Championship. The Joe McDonagh Cup champions replace the bottom-placed team in the provincial championship containing six teams.

==== Relegation ====
The bottom-placed team in the Joe McDonagh Cup are automatically relegated to the following year's Christy Ring Cup and are replaced by the Christy Ring Cup champions.

=== Teams by province ===
The participating teams, listed by province, with numbers in parentheses indicating final positions in the 2024 National Hurling League before the championship were:

Leinster (4)

- Laois (13)
- Meath (18)
- Offaly (11)
- Westmeath (10)

Munster (1)

- Kerry (17)

Ulster (1)

- Down (15)

== Teams ==
=== General information ===
Six counties will compete in the Joe McDonagh Cup:

County	Last Cup Title	Last Provincial Title	Last All-Ireland Title	Position in 2023 Championship	Appearance
Down	—	1997	—	5th	4th
Kerry	—	1891	1891	4th	7th
Laois	2019	1949	1915	3rd	4th
Meath	—	—	—	Champions (Christy Ring Cup)	5th
Offaly	—	1995	1998	Runners-up	4th
Westmeath	2021	—	—	6th (Leinster Senior Hurling Championship)	5th

=== Personnel and kits ===
County	Manager	Captain(s)	Sponsor
Down			
Kerry	Stephen Molumphy	Tomás O'Connor	Kerry Group
Laois	Willie Maher	Aaron Dunphy	Laois Hire
Meath			
Offaly	Johnny Kelly	Jason Sampson	Glenisk
Westmeath			

== Draws ==
=== Group stage seeding ===
The fixtures for the group stage were an open draw.

Numbers in brackets indicate ranking in the 2024 NHL.

Pot

- Westmeath (10)
- Offaly (11)
- Laois (13)
- Down (15)
- Kerry (17)
- Meath (18)

=== All-Ireland seeding ===
The All-Ireland Senior Hurling Championship draw took place in 7 December 2023.

Seeded into preliminary quarter-finals

- Joe McDonagh Cup winners
- Joe McDonagh Cup runners-up

Unseeded into preliminary quarter-finals

- 3rd place Leinster Senior Hurling Championship
- 3rd place Munster Senior Hurling Championship

== Group Stage ==
=== Table ===
Pos	Team	Pld	W	D	L	SF	SA	Diff	Pts	Qualification
1	Laois	5	4	0	1	14-122	3-101	+54	8	Advance to Final and All-Ireland preliminary quarter-finals
2	Offaly (P)	5	4	0	1	15-125	9-97	+46	8	Advance to Final and All-Ireland preliminary quarter-finals
3	Kerry	5	3	0	2	4-92	8-85	-5	6	
6	Westmeath	5	2	1	2	6-114	6-92	+22	5	
5	Down	5	1	1	3	11-97	10-130	-30	3	
6	Meath (R)	5	0	0	5	5-81	19-126	-87	0	Relegated to Christy Ring Cup

=== Round 1 ===
20 April 2024 Round 1	Down	3-24 (33) – 0-25 (25)	Meath	Ballycran
2pm		(HT: 1-15 - 0-13)		Venue: McKenna Park
	Pts: T Prenter 2-1, D Sands 1-3, P Sheehan 0-5 (4fs), P Óg McCrickard 0-3 (2fs), O McManus and E Sands 0-2 each, M Fisher, D Hughes, L Savage, C Taggart, D Hughes, and F Turpin 0-1 each.	Report	Pts: P O'Hanrahan 0-17 (15fs), E Óg Ó Donnchadha 0-2, S Ennis, J Toher, K Gorman, N McLarnon, N Potterton, S Martin 0-1 each.	Referee: C McDonald (Antrim)

21 April 2024 Round 1	Laois	2-21 (27) – 0-24 (24)	Offaly	Portlaoise
2pm		(HT: 0-11 - 0-16)		Venue: O'Moore Park
	Pts: P Purcell 2-1, A Dunphy 0-5 (three frees), A Corby and S Maher (two frees, one 65) 0-4 each, J Quinlan 0-3, T Cuddy 0-2, L O'Connell and J Lennon 0-1 each	Report	Pts: A Screeney 0-8 (four frees), B Duignan 0-4 (two frees), S Bourke, K Sampson, E Cahill (one free) and D Bourke 0-2 each, D Ravenhill, C King, C Mitchel and L Fox 0-1 each	Referee: C Cunning (Antrim)

21 April 2024 Round 1	Westmeath	1-14 (17) – 1-20 (23)	Kerry	Mullingar
2pm		(HT: 0-6 - 0-9)		Venue: TEG Cusack Park
	Pts: K Doyle 0-11 (7f), T Doyle 1-1, A Clarke, s McGovern 0-1 each	Report	Pts: M O'Connor 1-10 (10f), F Mackessy 0-4 (2f), R Walsh 0-3, D Shanahan, N Mulcahy, K Hayes 0-1 each	Referee: S Cleere (Kilkenny)

=== Round 2 ===
27 April 2024 Round 2	Meath	1-16 (19) – 7-29 (50)	Laois	Navan
3pm		(HT: 1-8 - 2-16)		Venue: Páirc Tailteann
	Pts: N Potterton 0-4 (0-1f, 0-1 65), M Horan 1-0, S Quigley 0-3, J Toher 0-2 (0-2f), K Gorman 0-1, T Shine 0-1, S Martin 0-1, J Kelly 0-1, S Ennis 0-1, E Og O Donnchadha 0-1, D Rogers 0-1	Report	Pts: W Dunphy 1-4, M Dowling 2-0, M Phelan 1-2, T Keyes 1-2, A Dunphy 0-5, J Duggan 1-1, P Purcell 0-4, S Maher 0-4 (0-1f, 0-1 65), E Rowland 1-0 (1-0 pen), P Delaney 0-2, D Dooley 0-2, A Corby 0-2, FC Fennell 0-1	Referee: P Owens (Down)

27 April 2024 Round 2	Offaly	2-23 (29) – 1-20 (23)	Westmeath	Tullamore
3pm		(HT: 1-11 - 1-11)		Venue: Glenisk O'Connor Park
	Pts: B Duignan 1-11 (1-0 pen, 8fs, 1 65), C Kiely 0-3, D Bourke 1-0, K Sampson 0-2, C Mitchell 0-2, E Kelly 0-2, B Conneely 0-1, C King 0-1, L Fox 0-1	Report	Pts: K Doyle 0-15 (10fs, 1 65), D O’Reilly 1-1, E Keyes 0-1, R Greville 0-1, D Williams 0-1, D Glennon 0-1	Referee: B Keon (Galway)

28 April 2024 Round 2	Kerry	0-26 (26) – 2-12 (18)	Down	Tralee
13:00		(HT: 0-10 – 2-04)		Venue: Austin Stack Park
	Pts: M O’Connor (0-13, 7s), D Goggin (0-4), F Mackessy (1f) and R Walsh (0-2 each), C Walsh, K Hayes, B Barrett, D Woulfe and G Dooley (0-1 each)	Report	Pts: D Sands (1-1), C Taggart (1-0), P Sheehan (0-3fs), T Prenter, E Sands and C Egan (0-2 each), D Hughes and F Turpin (0-1 each)	Referee: C Doyle (Tipperary)

=== Round 3 ===
4 May 2024 Round 3	Down	3-19 (28) – 1-25 (28)	Westmeath	Ballycran
3pm				Venue: McKenna Park
	Pts: P Óg McCrickard 0-13 (9f), T McGrattan 3-2, P Savage 0-2, D Hughes, D Sands 0-1 each.	Report	Pts: K Doyle 1-7 (6f), D O’Reilly 0-5, D Williams 0-4 (2f), K Regan, D Clinton, C Doyle (1f) 0-2 each, A Clarke, O McCabe, T Doyle 0-1 each.

4 May 2024 Round 3	Meath	3-16 (25) – 5-31 (46)	Offaly	Navan
				Venue: Páirc Tailteann
	Pts: N Potterton (2-5, 1-5f), T Shine (1-2), E Og O Donnchadha, D Murtagh, K Gorman (0-2 each), N McLarnon, M Horan, J Kelly (0-1).	Report	Pts: C Mitchell (1-7), D Bourke (1-3), E Cahill (0-6, 3f), B Duignan (0-6, 5f), K Sampson (1-2), A Screeney (1-1), O Kelly (1-0), D King, E Kelly (0-2 each), C Kiely, D Shirley (0-1 each).

4 May 2024 Round 3	Kerry	0-18 (18) – 1-25 (28)	Laois	Tralee
3pm				Venue: Austin Stack Park
	Pts: F Mackessy 0-5 (2f), C Walsh 0-4 (3f), M O’Connor 0-3 (2f, 1 ‘65’), R Walsh 0-3, K Hayes 0-1, M Leane 0-1, B Barrett 0-1	Report	Pts: A Dunphy 0-11 (8f, 1 ‘65’), S Maher 0-3 (2f, 1 ‘65’), T Keyes 1-1, L O’Connell 0-2, P Purcell 0-2, D Dooley 0-2, A Corby 0-2, T Cuddy 0-1, J Lennon 0-1

=== Round 4 ===
18 May 2024 Round 4	Westmeath	1-29 (32) – 0-14 (14)	Meath	Mullingar
				Venue: TEG Cusack Park
	Pts: K Doyle 0-8 (3fs, 1‘65’), D Clinton 1-4, D O’Reilly 0-6, D Williams 0-4, P Clarke, R Greville 0-2 each, T Doyle, A Clarke, O McCabe 0-1 each.	Report	Pts: J Murray, N Potterton (3f) 0-3 each, T Shine, K Gorman 0-2 each, S Ennis, J Kelly, E Óg Ó Donnchadha, S Geraghty 0-1 each.

18 May 2024 Round 4	Laois	4-31 (43) – 0-17 (17)	Down	Portlaoise
				Venue: Laois Hire O'Moore Park
	Pts: W Dunphy and T Keyes 2-2 each, A Dunphy (3fs) and R King (2fs, 1 65) 0-5 each, A Corby 0-4, J Quinlan and D Dooley 0-3 each, P Purcell 0-2, J Duggan, P Delaney, C Comerford, R Mullaney and M Phelan 0-1 each.	Report	Pts: P Og McCrickard 0-5 (3fs), P Sheehan 0-4 (1f), M Fisher, T McGrattan, M Conlon, C Taggart, F Turpin, D Sands and P Savage 0-1 each

19 May 2024 Round 4	Offaly	3-24 (33) – 0-15 (15)	Kerry	Tullamore
				Venue: Glenisk O'Connor Park
	Pts: E Cahill (1-8, 1-0 pen, 4fs, ’65), K Sampson (1-2), C Mitchell ( 0-4), O Kelly (1-0), B Duignan (0-3), J Sampson and C Kelly (0-2 each) C King and D Maher (0-1 each).	Report	Pts: M O’Connor (0-8, 6fs, 1’45), C Walsh (0-2, 1f), F Mackessy, R Walsh, K Hayes, D Woulfe and N Mulcahy (0-1 each).

=== Round 5 ===
25 May 2024 Round 5	Kerry	3-13 (22) – 1-10 (13)	Meath	Tralee
				Venue: Austin Stack Park
	Pts: G Dooley 2-3, B Barrett 0-4 (4fs), M Leane 1-0, L Crowley 0-2, F Mackessy 0-2 (0-1 ’65), E Murphy 0-1, D Goggin 0-1,	Report	Pts: J Murray 1-7 (6fs, 1-0pen), S Ennis 0-1, K Rogers 0-1, S Geraghty 0-1.

25 May 2024 Round 5	Westmeath	2-26 (32) – 0-16 (16)	Laois	Mullingar
				Venue: TEG Cusack Park
	Pts: D Williams 0-11 (7fs, 1'65'), N Mitchell 2-0, D O'Reilly 0-4, D Clinton, R Greville, K Doyle 0-2 each, A Clarke, P Clarke, K Regan, O McCabe 0-1, T Doyle 0-1 each.	Report	Pts: R King 0-7 (5fs), L Cleere, J Keyes, G Lynch 0-2 each, C Comerford, M Phelan, W Dunphy 0-1 each.

25 May 2024 Round 5	Down	3-25 (34) – 5-23 (38)	Offaly	Ballycran
				Venue: McKenna Park
	Pts: D Sands 3-2, P Shehan 0-10 (9f, 1'65), P Og McCrickard 0-5, E Sands 0-2, T McGrattan 0-2, C Taggart 0-2, R McCrickard, D Hughes 0-1 each.	Report	Pts: B Duignan 1-9 3f, O Kelly 1-3, J Clancy 2-1, J Nally1-2, E Kelly 0-2, E Cahill 0-2, D King, L Watkins, R Ravenhill, S Burke, 0-1 each.

== Knockout stage ==
=== Final ===
8 June 2024
3pm

Laois	0-26 (26) – (29) 2-23	Offaly
A Dunphy 0-11 (0-6f, 0-2 65), P Purcell 0-5, A Corby 0-4, FC Fennell 0-1, T Keyes 0-1, L O'Connell 0-1, J Duggan 0-1, I Shanahan 0-1, R King 0-1	Report	B Duignan 1-4, E Cahill 0-7 (0-5f), C Mitchell 0-4, O Kelly 1-0, C Kiely 0-2, K Sampson 0-2, King 0-1, A Screeney 0-1, D Bourke 0-1, J Clancy 0-1

Croke Park
Referee: C McDonald (Antrim)
Man of the match: Charlie Mitchell (Offaly)
- Laois and Offaly qualify to the All-Ireland Senior Hurling Championship preliminary quarter-finals.
- Offaly are also promoted to the 2025 Leinster Senior Hurling Championship.

== Stadia and locations ==
County	Location	Province	Stadium(s)	Capacity
Neutral	Dublin	Leinster	Croke Park	82,300
Down	Ballycran	Ulster	McKenna Park	5,000
Kerry	Tralee	Munster	Austin Stack Park	12,000
Laois	Portlaoise	Leinster	Laois Hire O'Moore Park	22,000
Meath	Navan	Leinster	Páirc Tailteann	11,000
Offaly	Tullamore	Leinster	Glenisk O'Connor Park	20,000
Westmeath	Mullingar	Leinster	TEG Cusack Park	11,000

== Statistics ==
=== Top scorers ===
Overall

Rank	Player	County	Tally	Total	Matches	Average
1	Brian Duignan	Offaly	3-37	46	6	7.66
1	Killian Doyle	Westmeath	1-43	46	5	9.20
3	Maurice O'Connor	Kerry	1-34	37	4	9.25
4	Aaron Dunphy	Laois	0-37	37	5	7.40
5	Eoghan Cahill	Offaly	1-25	28	5	5.60
6	Pearse Óg McCrickard	Down	0-26	26	5	5.20
7	Daithí Sands	Down	5-08	23	5	4.60
8	Paul Sheehan	Down	0-22	22	5	4.40
9	Charlie Mitchell	Offaly	1-18	21	5	4.20
10	Patrick Purcell	Laois	2-14	20	5	4.00
10	David Williams	Westmeath	0-20	20	5	4.00

In a single game

Rank	Player	County	Tally	Total	Opposition
1	Padraic O'Hanrahan	Meath	0-17	17	Down
2	Killian Doyle	Westmeath	0-15	15	Offaly
3	Brian Duignan	Offaly	1-11	14	Westmeath
4	Maurice O'Connor	Kerry	1-10	13	Westmeath
4	Maurice O'Connor	Kerry	0-13	13	Down
4	Pearse Óg McCrickard	Down	0-13	13	Westmeath
7	Brian Duignan	Offaly	1-09	12	Down
8	Daithí Sands	Down	3-02	11	Offaly
8	Nicky Potterton	Meath	2-05	11	Offaly
8	Eoghan Cahill	Offaly	1-08	11	Kerry
8	Aaron Dunphy	Laois	0-11	11	Kerry
8	Killian Doyle	Westmeath	0-11	11	Kerry
8	David Williams	Westmeath	0-11	11	Laois
8	Aaron Dunphy	Laois	0-11	11	Offaly

=== Scoring events ===
- Widest winning margin: 31 points
  - Meath 1-16 - 7-29 Laois (Round 2)
- Most goals in a match: 8
  - Meath 1-16 - 7-29 Laois (Round 2)
  - Meath 3-16 - 5-31 Offaly (Round 3)
  - Down 3-25 - 5-23 Offaly (Round 5)
- Most points in a match: 49
  - Down 3-24 - 0-25 Meath (Round 1)
  - Offaly 2-23 - 0-26 Laois (Final)
- Most goals by one team in a match: 7
  - Meath 1-16 - 7-29 Laois (Round 2)
- Most points by one team in a match: 31
  - Meath 3-16 - 5-31 Offaly (Round 3)
  - Laois 4-31 - 0-17 Down (Round 4)
- Highest aggregate score: 72 points
  - Down 3-25 - 5-23 Offaly (Round 5)
- Lowest aggregate score: 35 points
  - Kerry 3-13 - 1-10 Meath (Round 5)

== Miscellaneous ==
- Offaly won their 1st championship in 3 years, last winning the 2021 Christy Ring Cup.
- Offaly become the fifth different county to win the Joe McDonagh Cup.
- First-time Joe McDonagh Cup meetings:
  - Down v Westmeath (Round 3)
- Meath are relegated from the Joe McDonagh Cup for a record third time.

== See also ==
- 2024 All-Ireland Senior Hurling Championship
- 2024 Leinster Senior Hurling Championship
- 2024 Munster Senior Hurling Championship
- 2024 Christy Ring Cup (Tier 3)
- 2024 Nicky Rackard Cup (Tier 4)
- 2024 Lory Meagher Cup (Tier 5)
