= Seán Hayes (hurler) =

Irish hurler

Sean Hayes
Personal information
- Born: 21/01/2001
- Occupation: Business Owner-Up Eats Cafe Nenagh

Sport
- Sport: Hurling
- Position: Corner-forward
Club
- Years: Club
- Kiladangan
Club titles
- Tipperary titles: 2
Inter-county
Years	County	Apps (scores)
2024 -	Tipperary	0 (0-00)
Inter-county titles
- Munster titles: 0
- All-Irelands: 0
- NHL: 0
- All Stars: 0

Sean Hayes is an Irish hurler who plays club hurling for Kiladangan and at inter-county level with the Tipperary senior hurling team.

== Career ==
On 24 February 2024, he made his league debut for Tipperary in the third round of the 2024 National Hurling League against Westmeath as Tipperary won by 3–25 to 2-21.

== Honours ==
Tipperary

- All-Ireland Under-20 Hurling Championship (1): 2019
- Munster Under-20 Hurling Championship (1): 2019
- Minor under 17 Munster 2018
- Munster Minor Hurler of the year 2018

Kildangan

- Tipperary Senior Hurling Championship (2): 2020,2023
