= Seán Kenneally =

Irish hurler

Sean Kenneally
Sport
- Sport: Hurling
- Position: Corner-forward
Club
- Years: Club
- Moneygall
Club titles
- Tipperary titles: 0
Inter-county*
Years	County	Apps (scores)
2024 -	Tipperary	6 (1-06)
Inter-county titles
- Munster titles: 0
- All-Irelands: 0
- NHL: 0
- All Stars: 0
- *Inter County team apps and scores correct as of match played 18 May 2025.

Sean Kenneally is an Irish hurler who plays club hurling for Moneygall and at inter-county level with the Tipperary senior hurling team.

== Career ==
On 11 February 2024, he made his league debut for Tipperary in the second round of the 2024 National Hurling League against Galway as Tipperary won by 0–24 to 1–16.

== Career statistics ==
As of match played 18 May 2025

Team	Year	National League			Munster		All-Ireland		Total	
Team	Year	Division	Apps	Score	Apps	Score	Apps	Score	Apps	Score
Tipperary	2024	Division 1A	3	0-04	3	1-04	—		6	1-08
Tipperary	2025	Division 1A	4	1-05	3	0-02			7	1-07
Total			7	1-09	6	1-06			13	2-15
