= Sam Bourke =

Irish hurler

Personal information
- Native name: Somhairle de Burca (Irish)
- Born: 2003 (age 22–23) Durrow, County Offaly, Ireland
- Occupation: Student

Sport
- Sport: Hurling
- Position: Left wing-back
Club
- Years: Club
- 2021-present: Ballinamere
Club titles
- Offaly titles: 0
College
- Years: College
- 2022-present: DCU Dóchas Éireann
College titles
- Fitzgibbon titles: 0
Inter-county
- Years: County
- 2023-present: Offaly
Inter-county titles
- Leinster titles: 0
- All-Irelands: 0
- NHL: 0
- All Stars: 0

Sam Bourke (born 2003) is an Irish hurler. At club level he plays with Ballinamere and at inter-county level with the Offaly senior hurling team. He is a brother of Dan Bourke.

== Career ==
Bourke first played hurling and Gaelic football to a high standard as a student at Coláiste Choilm in Tullamore. After progressing through the juvenile and underage ranks with the Ballinamere club, he made his senior team debut in 2021. Bourke has also lined out for DCU Dóchas Éireann in the Fitzgibbon Cup.

Bourke first appeared on the inter-county scene during a two-year tenure with the Offaly minor hurling team, which culminated with a defeat by Kilkenny in the 2020 Leinster minor final. He immediately progressed to the under-20 team and was at centre-back when they lost the 2023 All-Ireland under-20 final to Cork.

Bourke made his senior team debut in a defeat by Carlow in the 2023 Joe McDonagh Cup final. He claimed a winners' medal in that competition after a defeat of Laois in the 2024 final.

== Honours ==
Offaly

- Joe McDonagh Cup: 2024
- Leinster Under-20 Hurling Championship: 2023
