= 2024 Tipperary county hurling team season =

Hurling (sport) season

- Team: Tipperary county
- Manager: Liam Cahill
- Captain: Ronan Maher
- All-Ireland SHC: Did not qualify
- Munster SHC: 4th in Group Stage
- National League: Semi-finalists
- Top scorer Championship: Jake Morris (0-17); Jason Forde (0-17)
- Highest SHC attendance: 43,972 (v Cork 19 May)
- Lowest SHC attendance: 11,966 (v Waterford 4 May)
- Standard Kit

The 2024 season was Liam Cahill's second year as manager of the Tipperary senior hurling team.

The team was sponsored for the third year by financial services technology solutions company Fiserv. The team wore a new home O'Neills jersey with a yellow ribbed neck design and a tribute watermark image of Michael Hogan displayed on the right sleeve.

On 30 January Ronan Maher was named as captain for 2024, with Jake Morris named as vice-captain. Maher had previously been the captain in 2022.

It is the first season since 2008 without Séamus Callanan who announced his retirement from inter-county hurling in September 2023.

== 2024 senior hurling management team ==
Liam Cahill continued as manager for the second year of a three-year term with Toomevara's Michael Bevans continuing as coach. Loughmore Castleiney's Declan Laffan and Clonoulty Rossmore's TJ Ryan also continued as selectors with Tony Browne continuing in his role as coaching support. In September 2023, Pádraic Maher left his position as a selector due to unforeseen changes in his work circumstances.

=== 2024 squad ===
On 24 November 2023, collective inter-county training for pre-season commenced at Dr Morris Park in Thurles. A full training panel for the new season was announced in January.

The following players made their competitive senior debut in 2024.

- Andrew Ormond against Dublin on 3 February.
- Darragh Stakelum against Dublin on 3 February.
- Sean Kenneally against Galway on 11 February.
- Billy Seymour against Galway on 11 February.
- David Kelly against Westmeath on 24 February.
- Sean Hayes against Westmeath on 24 February.
- Cathal Quinn against Westmeath on 24 February.
- Danny Slattery against Antrim on 16 March

== 2024 Munster Senior Hurling League ==
=== Summary ===
The Co-Op Superstores Munster Senior Hurling League began in early January.

Tipperary played Waterford in their first match of the year on 7 January. The match was played in very cold but bright conditions. Danny Slattery, Conor Whelan, Sean Hayes, Andrew Ormond and Mikey O’Shea all started for Tipperary for the first time. Three points in injury time from Padraig Fitzgerald, Reuben Halloran and Seanie Callaghan won the game for Waterford on a 1–22 to 1–20 scoreline, they had a 1–12 to 0–8 lead at half-time. The game was shown live on Clubber. The Tipperary goal came from Sean Ryan with fifteen minutes to go with a low shot to the corner of the net to put just two points between the team. Robert Byrne received a straight red card on 24 minutes for a wild pull across Jack Prendergast, and were nine points down at one stage in the second half. The match had been delayed by five minutes due to crowd congestion at the turnstiles with 1,500 tickets pre-sold for this fixture.

A week later on 14 January, Tipperary played their second game in the Munster Senior Hurling League against Kerry in MacDonagh Park in Nenagh. The match was played in freezing conditions and was shown live on Clubber. Cathal Quinn, Enda Dunphy, Killian O’Dwyer, Josh Keller, and Sean Kenneally all started for the first time in a young development team. The team featured only seven players that played in the 2023 championship, with double All-Ireland medal winner Barry Heffernan also returning after having missed 2023 through injury. Tipperary has a 0–17 to 1–11 lead at half-time and in the second half Gearoid O’Connor scored from a penalty in the 48th minute after substitute Andrew Ormond was fouled with Tipperary going on to win by 1–28 to 1–14.

=== Results ===
7 January
14:00
Munster Senior Hurling League Group B Round 1

Waterford	1–22 – 1–20	Tipperary
P Fitzgerald 0-10 (6fs), J Prendergast 1-3, T Barron, P Curran 0-2 each, S Callaghan, R Halloran, PJ Fanning, C Bonnar, M Kiely 0-1 each.	Report Barry Hogan (c); D Slattery, M Breen, C Morgan; C Whelan, R Byrne, C Bowe; J Campion, A Tynan; C O’Dwyer, J Fogarty, S Hayes; A Ormond, M O’Shea, S Ryan. Subs: B O’Mara for Whelan (HT), B Heffernan for Campion (HT), D Stakelum for Hayes (HT), B McGrath for O’Shea (HT), C Quinn for Morgan (39), S Kenneally for Ormond (49), M Kehoe for Fogarty (54), B Seymour for O’Dwyer (61).	S Ryan 1-12 (9fs), A Tynan 0-2, C O’Dwyer, J Fogarty, A Ormond, M O’Shea, S Kenneally, C Quinn 0-1 each.

Dungarvan
Referee: Simon Stokes (Cork)
14 January
14:00
Munster Senior Hurling League Group B Round 2

Tipperary	1–28 – 1–14	Kerry
Gearoid O’Connor (1-10, 0-9f, 0-1 65, 1-0 pen), Sean Kenneally (0-4, 0-1f), Barry Heffernan 0-3, Conor Bowe, Cian O’Dywer 0-2 each, Conor Whelan (0-2, 0-1f, 0-1 65), Mark Kehoe, Bryan O’Mara, John Campion, Max Hackett, David Kelly all 0-1 each.	Report Enda Dunphy; Cathal Quinn, Brian McGrath, Killian O’Dwyer; Conor Bowe, Bryan O’Mara, Enda Heffernan; Johnny Ryan, Barry Heffernan; Cian O’Dwyer, Gearoid O’Connor, Josh Keller; Mark Kehoe, Mikey O’Shea, Sean Kenneally. Subs: Danny Slattery for K O’Dwyer (21, inj); Andrew Ormond for O’Shea (HT); Darragh Stakelum for B Heffernan (50); Gavin O’Halloran for C O’Dywer (50); David Kelly for Quinn (50); Pairic Campion for E Heffernan (57); John Campion for Ryan (57); Joe Fogarty for Keller (61); Conor Whelan for O’Mara (61).	Shane Conway (0-8f), Dan Goggin 1-2, Luke Crowley 0-3, Brandon Barrett 0-1.

MacDonagh Park
Referee: Joe Mullins (Clare)

== Challenge Games ==
=== Challenge against Clare ===
On 21 January at 10:30am, Tipperary played Clare in a challenge match in Nenagh with Tipperary winning on a 1–26 to 1–20 scoreline. The teams played four twenty-minute segments.

=== Dillon Quirke Foundation senior hurling challenge ===
On 28 January Tipperary played Limerick in the Dillon Quirke Foundation senior hurling challenge at Semple Stadium. The Dillon Quirke Foundation was established by the Quirke family in memory of Dillon Quirke who died after collapsing during a club game in August 2022. Tipperary won the game on a 3–27 to 1–20 scoreline in front of 3,218. They had a 3–13 to 1–13 at half-time with the goals coming from John McGrath with a penalty after 10 minutes and a second after 29 minutes. Andrew Ormond got the third goal in the 32nd minute.

28 January
14:00
Challenge Tournament

Tipperary	3–27 – 1–20	Limerick
J McGrath (2-9, 1-0 pen, 0-6 frees); A Ormond (1-2); J Morris (0-3); A Tynan, G O’Connor (1 free) (0-2 each); R Maher, E Heffernan, E Connolly, Jack Ryan, M Kehoe, C Bowe, W Connors, J Fogarty, S Ryan (0-1 each).	Report B Hogan; D Slattery, R Maher, Johnny Ryan; M Breen, R Byrne, E Heffernan; E Connolly, J Campion; Jack Ryan (c), J McGrath, A Tynan; A Ormond, M Kehoe, J Morris; Subs: C Morgan for Slattery (34, inj), C Bowe for Heffernan (h-t), P Maher for Kehoe (h-t), W Connors for Campion (h-t), B Seymour for Jack Ryan (53), S Ryan for Morris (53), P Cadell for Connolly (56), B Heffernan for Byrne (60), G O’Connor for McGrath (61), G O’Halloran for Tynan (62), J Fogarty for Ormond (68), P Campion for Breen (68), B O’Mara for Johnny Ryan (68), C O’Dwyer for R Maher (69).	D Ó Dálaigh (1-3); P O’Donovan (2 frees), A English, D Reidy (4 frees) (0-4 each); O O’Reilly (0-2); C Coughlan, A O’Connor, L Flynn (0-1 each).

Semple Stadium
Referee: K Jordan (Tipperary).

== 2024 National Hurling League ==
=== Summary ===
The National hurling league started in early February with Tipperary opening their campaign against a Dublin team managed by Micheál Donoghue in Parnell Park on 3 February. The match was shown live on TG4. Just six players started this game that also started in the All-Ireland Quarter-final defeat to Galway in June 2023, Rhys Shelly, Ronan Maher, Bryan O’Mara, Eoghan Connolly, Alan Tynan and Jake Morris with Andrew Ormond from JK Brackens named at corner forward for his first competitive game for Tipperary. Tipperary were missing Jason Forde, Cathal Barrett, Michael Breen, Dan McCormack and Noel McGrath for this game with these players due to return during the league campaign. In dry conditions, Tipperary playing with the wind had a 0–17 to 0–9 lead at half-time. In the 44th minute, Sean Ryan scored a goal when he got away from Dublin defender Paddy Smyth on the right before and firing to the bottom left corner. In the 58th minute Jake Morris got a second goal for Tipperary when he scored after coming in from the left to shoot low from a tight angle to the right of the net with Tipperary going on to win by 2–27 to 0-22. Morris was also named as the man of the match.

A week later on Sunday the 11 February, in front of a crowd of 5,941, Tipperary played Galway managed by Henry Shefflin in Semple Stadium in round 2 of the National hurling league. The match was shown live on TG4. The team announced contained Moneygall's Sean Kenneally coming in to make his senior debut at corner forward. In dry conditions, Tipperary had a 0–16 to 0–13 lead at half-time and were 0–21 to 0-13 ahead eight minutes into the second-half before Galway scored the next seven points and eventually got level. Tipperary went 18 minutes without a score in the second half before eventually finishing strong. Tipperary were awarded a penalty in injury time when Conor Stakelum was dragged to the ground by Seán Linnane when running in on goal. Man of the match Gearóid O'Connor scored the penalty shooting powerfully to the middle of the goals giving Tipperary a win by five points on 1–16 to 0–24 scoreline.

On 24 February, Tipperary played Westmeath, managed by Joe Fortune in front of a crowd of 1,962 in Semple Stadium in round 3 of the National hurling league. The team showed 14 changes from the victory over Galway with debuts for David Kelly, Sean Hayes, and Cathal Quinn. Noel McGrath, Dan McCormack, Jason Forde and Conor Stakelum also returned to the team. Tipperary had a 2–12 to 0–10 lead at half-time after two goals by Mark Kehoe in the 27th and 28th minutes. In the second half Westmeath scored tow goals and reduced the lead to four points before an own goal by Westmeath goalkeeper Noel Conaty who turning the ball into his own net with Tipperary winning by 3–25 to 2-21.

On Saturday 9 March, Tipperary played Limerick, managed by John Kiely in round 4 of the National hurling league in Páirc Uí Chaoimh. The game was moved to Cork because of repair work being done on the playing surface at the Gaelic Grounds. The match was shown live on RTE 2 with commentary from Ger Canning and Michael Duignan. Analysis was provided by Shane Dowling and Liam Sheedy. The Tipperary team had 11 changes from the side that defeated Westmeath in round 3. In cold, wet and windy conditions Tipperary had a 1–7 to 0–9 lead at half-time with the goal coming from Jason Forde after 30 minutes. In the second half Limerick went in front after 50 minutes and were three points in front after 58 minutes before Patrick Maher robbed Colin Coughlan to score a goal for Tipperary. Limerick scored the next four points before an injury time goal by Jake Morris reduced the lead to one point, with Limerick going on to win by one on a 0–26 to 3–16 scoreline. Séamus Kennedy went off in the second half and after a scan it was revealed that he had suffered an ACL rupture and would be out of action for the rest of the year.

On 16 March, for the second year in a row, Tipperary travelled to Corrigan Park in Belfast to play Antrim, managed by Darren Gleeson in round 5 of the National hurling league. In wet conditions Tipperary had a 1–10 to 0–4 lead at half-time with Jake Morris getting the goal. In the second half, Morris got a second goal as Tipperary went on to win by 2–21 to 0-12 and reach the league semi-finals. The draw between Galway and Limerick earlier in the day had ensured any type of a win for Tipperary would be enough for a place in the semi-finals.

On Sunday 24 March, Tipperary played Clare, managed by Brian Lohan in the semi-final of the National hurling league in O'Moore Park in Portlaoise. The match was shown live on TG4. Barry Hogan was back in goals for Tipperary while Conor Bowe replaced Danny Slattery in defence. In wet conditions, Clare were 0–8 to no score in front after 12 minutes before Tipperary scored with a Jason Forde free. In the 17th minute Jake Morris got a goal for Tiperary with a low finish to the left corner of the net. Clare had 1–14 to 1–7 lead at half-time with the Clare goal coming from David Fitzgerald when he fired powerfully to the net. Fourteen seconds into the second half, substitute Seán Hayes got a second goal for Tipperary when he shot to the left of the net. The lead was cut to two points before Clare stretched the lead out again to five points and went on to win by eight on a 1–24 to 2–13 scoreline. Tipperary scored just one point from a free in the last 20 minutes of the game. Jake Morris was sent off in injury time after receiving a second yellow card. Tipperary hit 19 wide's during the game with nine missed frees from four different players, Jason Forde, Gearoid O'Connor, Willie Connors and Sean Ryan.

=== Results ===
3 February
14:30
Round 1

Dublin	0–22 – 2–27	Tipperary
Cian O’Sullivan 0-11 (0-8f, 0-1 s/l), Fergal Whitely 0-3, Conor Burke 0-2, Sean Currie 0-2, Brian Hayes 0-1, Jake Malone 0-1, Diarmaid O Dulaing 0-1, Paul Crummey 0-1.	Report R Shelly; C Morgan, R Maher (c), J Ryan; B O’Mara, R Byrne, C Bowe; W Connors, E Connolly; G O’Connor, J McGrath, A Tynan; J Morris, Sean Ryan, A Ormond; Subs: M Kehoe for McGrath (51); Darragh Stakelum for Tynan (56); B Heffernan for Connolly (61); J Fogarty for Connors (64); Patrick Maher for Ormond (68).	Gearoid O’Connor 0-12 (0-8f, 0-1 65, 0-1 s/l), Jake Morris 1-4, Sean Ryan 1-0, Eoghan Connolly 0-2, Rhys Shelly 0-1 (0-1f), Willie Connors 0-1, Bryan O’Mara 0-1, Conor Bowe 0-1, Craig Morgan 0-1, Alan Tynan 0-1, John McGrath 0-1, Andrew Ormond 0-1, Joe Fogarty 0-1.

Parnell Park
Referee: S Hynes (Galway).
11 February
15:45
Round 2

Tipperary	1–26 – 0–24	Galway
Gearoid O’Connor 1-13 (0-9 frees); Mark Kehoe 0-3; Conor Bowe, Willie Connors 0-2 each; Seamus Kennedy, Craig Morgan, John McGrath, Alan Tynan, Sean Kenneally and Jake Morris 0-1 each.	Report Barry Hogan; C. Morgan, R. Byrne, R. Maher (c); B. O’Mara, M. Breen, C. Bowe; W. Connors, S. Kennedy; A. Tynan, G. O’Connor, J. McGrath; S. Ryan, J. Morris, S. Kenneally; Subs: J. Ryan for B. O’Mara (inj 16); M. Kehoe for J. Morris (21); B. Seymour for S. Ryan (53); D. Stakelum for A. Tynan (61); P. Maher for D. Stakelum (temp, 64-); C. Stakelum for S. Kenneally (69).	Evan Niland 0-10 (0-9 frees); Conor Cooney 0-5, Gavin Lee, Tom Monaghan, Conor Whelan 0-2 each; Cianan Fahy, Donal O’Shea, Sean Linnane 0-1 each.

Semple Stadium
Referee: Colm Lyons (Cork)
24 February
16:00
Round 3

Tipperary	3–25 – 2–21	Westmeath
J Forde (0-12, 11 frees); M Kehoe (2-1); C Stakelum (0-6); N Conaty (1-0 own goal); N McGrath (0-3); C Quinn, S Hayes, J Campion (0-1 each).	Report R Shelly; Johnny Ryan, B Heffernan, D Kelly; D McCormack, B McGrath, S Kennedy (c); N McGrath, C Quinn; S Hayes, J Forde, C Stakelum; A Ormond, B Seymour, M Kehoe. Subs: P Maher for Kehoe (h-t), J Fogarty for Seymour (53), C O’Dwyer for Ormond (53), J Campion for Quinn (60), E Heffernan for B Heffernan (64).	D Williams (2-12, 0-7 frees, 0-2 65s); K Doyle (1 free), D O’Reilly (0-2 each); T Doyle, P Clarke, J Boyle, N Mitchell, C Doyle (0-1 each).

Semple Stadium
Referee: S Cleere (Kilkenny)
9 March
19:35
Round 4

Limerick	0–26 – 3–16	Tipperary
A Gillane (0-8, 7 frees); D Byrnes (1 free), D Ó Dálaigh (0-3 each); C Coughlan, G Hegarty, C Lynch (0-2 each); M Casey, C Boylan, A English, S Flanagan, T Morrissey (free), G Mulcahy (0-1 each).	Report B Hogan; C Morgan, R Maher (c), M Breen; C Bowe, B McGrath, S Kennedy; E Connolly, P Cadell; A Tynan, C Stakelum, G O’Connor; J Forde, J McGrath, J Morris; Subs: D McCormack for Bowe (3-10, temporary), B O’Mara for B McGrath (h-t), P Maher for O’Connor (41-45, temporary), McCormack for Kennedy (47, inj), S Ryan for J McGrath (52), P Maher for Tynan (57), C Quinn for Cadell (64).	J Forde (1-7, 0-3 frees); J Morris (1-3); P Maher (1-0); G O’Connor (0-3); C Morgan, A Tynan, S Ryan (0-1 each).

Páirc Uí Chaoimh
Referee: L Gordon (Galway)
16 March
15:00
Round 5

Antrim	0–12 – 2–21	Tipperary
A O'Brien (0-8, 7 frees); N McKenna (0-3); R McAteer (0-1)	Report Rhys Shelly; Danny Slattery, Ronan Maher (c), Craig Morgan; Michael Breen, Robert Byrne, Bryan O'Mara; Paddy Cadell, Eoghan Connolly; Conor Stakelum, Sean Kenneally, Noel McGrath; Jake Moris, Jason Forde, Sean Ryan. Subs: Sean Hayes for S Ryan (HT), Darragh Stakelum for E Connolly (40), Cathal Quinn for P Cadell (49), Dan McCormack for N McGrath (56), Billy Seymour for S Kenneally (65)	J Forde (0-12, 8f, 1 65); J Morris (2-2); S Kenneally (0-2); E Connolly, B O'Mara, D Slattery, D McCormack, D Stakelum (0-1 each)

Corrigan Park
Referee: C Mooney (Dublin)
24 March
16:00
Semi-final

Clare	1–24 – 2–13	Tipperary
A. McCarthy (0-8, 6 frees, 1 65); D. Fitzgerald (1-3); M. Rodgers (frees), D. D. Reidy (0-3 each); K Smyth (0-2); D. Ryan, D. Lohan, A. Hogan C. Malone, C. Galvin (0-1 each).	Report B. Hogan; C. Morgan, R. Maher (c), B. O’Mara; D. McCormack, R. Byrne, M. Breen; W. Connors, C. Bowe; C. Stakelum, G. O’Connor, D. Stakelum; J. Forde, P. Maher, J. Morris; Subs: A. Tynan for D. Stakelum, S. Hayes for P. Maher (both h-t); S. Kenneally for C. Stakelum (43); J. Ryan for C. Bowe (55); S. Ryan for G. O’Connor (61).	J. Forde (0-6, 5 frees); J. Morris (1-2); S. Hayes (1-0); D. McCormack, A. Tynan, W. Connors, S. Kenneally, S. Ryan (free) (0-1 each).

O'Moore Park
Referee: L. Gordon (Galway)

== 2024 Munster Senior Hurling Championship ==
=== Summary ===
The Munster Senior Hurling Championship started on 21 April. Tipperary didn't play on the opening weekend.

=== Round 1 (v Limerick 28 April) ===
On Sunday 28 April Tipperary played Limerick, managed by John Kiely in their first match of the Munster Championship at the Gaelic Grounds. Limerick had opened their campaign on 21 April with a 3–15 to 1–18 win against Clare in Ennis. The match was televised live on RTÉ 2 as part of the Sunday Game presented by Joanne Cantwell with on site analysis by Ursula Jacob, Anthony Daly and Dónal Óg Cusack. Commentary on the game was provided by Darragh Maloney alongside Michael Duignan. Tickets for the game cost €30 for the stand and €25 for the terrace. Tipperary manager Liam Cahill announced his team for the game on 25 April with Sean Hayes from Kiladangan named to make his championship debut at corner forward. The match was played front of a crowd of 33,475, earlier rain before the match cleared with wind blowing into the city end for the duration of the game. Tipperary played against the wind in the first-half. In the seventh minute Limerick had a goal disallowed when Kyle Hayes was incorrectly blown up for touching the ball on the ground. Jason Forde had three wides in the first half, two from 65's and Jake Morris had shots from the right blocked down on three occasions. Sean Hayes missed a goal opportunity in the 22nd minute when his shot from the right was blocked by the diving Limerick goalkeeper Nickie Quaid. Limerick had a 0–12 to 0–6 lead at half-time.

Noel McGrath came on at half-time for Tipperary and also Patrick Maher early in the second half as Tipperary started the half well, reducing the lead down to four points before Aaron Gillane scored a goal for Limerick in the 44th minute. He pounced on the loose ball before firing to the top left corner of the net after a miss-hit free from Diarmaid Byrnes to put Limerick into a seven-point lead. In the 53rd minute man of the match Peter Casey got a second goal for Limerick to put them fifteen points ahead when he scored with a low shot from the right. Casey was injured in the act of scoring the goal in a collision with Ronan Maher and he went off with what turned out to be a broken ankle. The game was over as a contest after that and Limerick went on to win by fifteen points on a 2–17 to 0–18.

=== Round 2 (v Waterford 4 May) ===
Six days later on Saturday evening 4 May, Tipperary played Waterford, managed by Davy Fitzgerald in their second match of the Munster Championship at the refurbished Walsh Park. Waterford had opened their campaign on 21 April with a 2–25 to 1–25 win against Cork in Walsh Park. The match was televised live on GAAGO for €12, or as part of a season pass for €79. Tickets for the game cost €30 for the stand and €25 for the terrace. Commentary on the game was by Mike Finnerty alongside Séamus Hickey. Tipperary manager Liam Cahill announced his team for the game on 2 May with no changes from the team that started in round 1 against Limerick. However, one the day he made three late changes to the starting team with Cathal Barrett, Noel McGrath, and Darragh Stakelum coming in for Johnny Ryan, Willie Connors, and Sean Hayes.

The match was played in front of 11,966 fans in sunny conditions. In the 4th minute, Waterford were awarded a penalty when Mikey Kiely was pulled back.Stephen Bennett scored to the right of the net. Referee James Owens had run across the eye line of Tipperary goalkeeper Barry Hogan as the ball was being struck from the penalty. In the 28th minute Waterford got a second goal when the un-marked Jack Prendergast scored low to the net from the right to make it 2–7 to 0–10. Two frees from Jason Forde cut the gap to one point before Calum Lyon got the final point of the half for Waterford to make the half-time score 2–8 to 0–12.

Tipperary got the first four points of the second half to lead before Waterford got a third goal in the 43rd minute, Stephen Bennett getting his second with a low powerful shot to the net after the ball was played out to him from a short free to make the score 3–8 to 0–16. The sides were level with four minutes remaining on a 3–16 to 0–25 scoreline before Waterford went into a four-point lead with three minutes of the four of added time remaining. Tipperary needed a goal and scored one when Jake Morris's initial shot from the left was saved before falling to substitute Sean Kenneally who forced the ball over the line from close range. Alan Tynan was then fouled with Gearoid O’Connor scoring the free for Tipperary with the last puck to level the game which finished in a draw, 3–21 to 1-27.

=== Round 3 (v Cork 19 May) ===
On Sunday the 19 May, Tipperary played Cork, managed by Pat Ryan in their third match of the Munster Championship and first home game at Semple Stadium. Cork went into the match after losing to both Waterford and Clare in rounds 1 and 2 before defeating Limerick in round 3 in Páirc Uí Chaoimh on 11 May. The match was televised live on RTÉ 2 as part of the Sunday Game presented by Joanne Cantwell with commentary by Marty Morrissey. Tickets for the game cost €30 for the stand and €25 for the terrace with the game being a sell-out. The match was played in front of a sold-out crowd of 43,972 in dry sunny conditions. Mark Kehoe got a goal for Tipperary playing into the Killinan End after eighteen seconds with a shot to the net on the ground from close range after Conor Bowes low shot from the left had been saved. Cork had a 1–15 to 1–12 lead at half-time and scored three more goals in the second half, with Alan Connolly completing a hat-trick to go on a win by eighteen points on a 4–30 to 1–21 scoreline and eliminate Tipperary from the Munster and All-Ireland Championships.

=== Round 4 (v Clare 26 May) ===
On Sunday the 26 May, Tipperary played Clare, managed by Brian Lohan in their final match in the Munster Championship at Semple Stadium. Tipperary had already been eliminated from both the Munster and All-Ireland championships before this match. Tipperary manager Liam Cahill made six changes to the side from the team that lost to Cork the week before. The match was televised live on the RTE News Channel. Tickets for the game cost €30 for the stand and €25 for the terrace. The match was played in front of 19,418 in dry dull conditions. The sides were level at 0-11 each at half-time. Diarmuid Ryan got a goal for Clare in the second half with a strike from the left past the advancing Barry Hogan to put them into a six-point lead which increased to eight before Tipperary replied with four unanswered points. Clare went on to win by 1–24 to 0-24.

After the match, when asked about his future Liam Cahill confirmed that he would return in 2025 saying "I have full support of the county board, 100 percent behind me, and what’s paramount to me and my management team is I have 100 percent support of the players next door. So, that’s not even a question.”

=== Results ===
28 April
16:00
Round 1

Limerick	2–27 – 0–18	Tipperary
A. Gillane (1-8, 0-6 frees); P. Casey (1-2); A. English (0-4); T. Morrissey, C. O’Neill (0-3 each); D. Reidy, D. Byrnes (frees) (0-2 each); K. Hayes, W. O’Donoghue, D. Ó Dalaigh (0-1 each)	Report; Highlights Barry. Hogan; J. Ryan, C. Morgan, R. Maher (c); C. Bowe, B. O’Mara, M. Breen; W. Connors, E. Connolly; A. Tynan, G. O’Connor, J. Forde; S. Hayes, J. Morris, M. Kehoe; Subs: N. McGrath for S. Hayes (h-t); P. Maher for M. Kehoe (42); A. Ormond for W. Connors (50); D. Stakelum for J. Morris (59); S. Kenneally for J. Forde (70).	J. Forde (0-9, 8 frees); M. Kehoe, G. O’Connor (1 free) (0-2 each); E. Connolly, A. Tynan, P. Maher, N. McGrath, J. Ryan (0-1 each).

Gaelic Grounds, Limerick
Referee: L. Gordon (Galway)
4 May
18:00
Round 2

Waterford	3–21 – 1–27	Tipperary
Stephen Bennett 2-3 (1-0 pen); Dessie Hutchinson 0-6 (3f); Jack Prendergast 1-1; Calum Lyons 0-3; Patrick Curran 0-2; Kieran Bennett, Darragh Lyons, Neil Montgomery, Michael Kiely, Jack Fagan, Shane Bennett 0-1 each.	Report; Highlights Barry Hogan; Cathal Barrett, Michael Breen, Craig Morgan; Conor Bowe, Ronan Maher (c), Bryan O’Mara; Eoghan Connolly, Alan Tynan; Noel McGrath, Gearóid O’Connor, Darragh Stakelum; Jake Morris, Mark Kehoe, Jason Forde; Subs: Patrick Maher for Forde (51), Willie Connors for Connolly (54), John McGrath for Noel McGrath (56), Seánie Kenneally for Stakelum (64), Dan McCormack for O’Mara (68).	Sean Kenneally 1-1; Gearóid O’Connor (3f), Mark Kehoe 0-4 each; Jason Forde (2f), Jake Morris 0-3 each; Ronan Maher (1f), Eoghan Connolly, Alan Tynan, Noel McGrath 0-2 each; Michael Breen, Darragh Stakelum, Patrick Maher, John McGrath 0-1 each.

Walsh Park, Waterford
Referee: James Owens (Wexford).
19 May
16:00
Round 3

Tipperary	1–21 – 4–30	Cork
J. Forde (0-5, 3 frees); M. Kehoe (1-0); J. Morris, J. McGrath (frees) (0-3 each); G. O’Connor, D. Stakelum N. McGrath (0-2 each); A. Tynan, R. Maher (free), C. Bowe, S. Hayes (0-1 each).	Report; Highlights Barry Hogan; C. Barrett, M. Breen, C. Morgan; B. O’Mara, R. Maher (c), C. Bowe; A. Tynan, E. Connolly; G. O’Connor, N. McGrath, J. Forde; J. Morris, D. Stakelum, M. Kehoe; Subs: P. Cadell for R. Maher (temp, 32-ht); C. Stakelum for E. Connolly (h-t); D. McCormack for C. Barrett (inj 42); J. McGrath for J. Forde (43); P. Maher for D. Stakelum (48); S. Hayes for G. O’Connor (56).	P. Horgan (1-9, 0-5 frees); A. Connolly (3-1); S. Kingston (0-4); D. Fitzgibbon, S. Harnedy (0-3 each); S. Barrett, B. Hayes, R. Downey (0-2 each); N. O’Leary, D. Dalton, C. Lehane, L. Meade (0-1 each)

Semple Stadium, Thurles
Referee: T. Walsh (Waterford)
26 May
16:00
Round 4

Tipperary	0–24 – 1–24	Clare
Jake Morris 0-11 (7fs), Seanie Kenneally 0-3, Ronan Maher 0-2 (1f), Eoghan Connolly and Gearoid O’Connor (2fs) 0-2 each, Barry Heffernan, Alan Tynan, Noel McGrath, and Bryan O’Mara 0-1 each.	Report; Highlights Barry Hogan; J Ryan, E Connolly, C Morgan; B McGrath, R Maher, B Heffernan; P Cadell, W Connors; A Tynan, J Morris, S Kenneally; G O’Connor, M Kehoe, A Ormond; Subs: D Stakelum for O’Connor (28); B O’Mara for B Heffernan (43); N McGrath for Cadell (44); C Stakelum for Ormond (52); Patrick Maher for Kehoe (56).	Aidan McCarthy 0-9 (6fs), Diarmuid Ryan 1-1, David Fitzgerald 0-3, Mark Rodgers 0-3 (2fs), Shane O’Donnell and Tony Kelly 0-2 each, Darragh Lohan, Peter Duggan, David Reidy, Ian Galvin 0-1 each.

Semple Stadium, Thurles
Referee: Johnny Murphy (Waterford)

== Awards ==
The PwC All-Star Awards

The nominations for the PwC All-Stars were announced on 20 September with Tipperary receiving no nominations in the 45-player shortlist.

== Retirements ==
On 7 October 2024, Patrick "Bonner" Maher announced his retirement from inter-county hurling after 16 years. In a released statement he said "After 16 years as a Tipperary senior hurler, I have decided that the time is right for me to announce my retirement from inter-county hurling, It has been a dream come true for me to have had the privilege and honour to wear the Tipperary jersey."

On 17 October 2024, Dan McCormack announced his retirement from inter-county hurling. In a released statement he said "Since joining the panel in 2015 it has been a huge honour to represent Tipperary and I will always cherish the time I got to wear the blue and gold at the highest possible level."
