= Brian Duignan =

Irish hurler

Personal information
- Born: 2000 (age 25–26) Ballinamere, County Offaly, Ireland
- Occupation: Secondary school teacher

Sport
- Sport: Hurling
- Position: Left wing-forward
Club
- Years: Club
- 2018-present: Ballinamere
Club titles
- Offaly titles: 0
College
- Years: College
- 2019-2023: DCU Dóchas Éireann
College titles
- Fitzgibbon titles: 0
Inter-county*
Years	County	Apps (scores)
2019-present	Offaly	2 (0-06)
Inter-county titles
- Leinster titles: 0
- All-Irelands: 0
- NHL: 0
- All Stars: 0
- *Inter County team apps and scores correct as of 16:34, 17 June 2024.

Brian Duignan (/ˈdaɪɡnən/ DYGHE-nən; born 2000) is an Irish hurler who plays for Offaly Championship club Ballinamere and at inter-county level with the Offaly senior hurling team. He usually lines out as a forward.

== Career ==
Son of Offaly All-Ireland-winner Michael Duignan, he first came to hurling prominence with the combined Ballinamere/Durrow club at juvenile and underage levels, while simultaneously lining out as a schoolboy with Coláiste Choilm in Tullamore. Duignan first appeared on the inter-county scene during a two-year stint with the Offaly under-20 team. He was drafted onto the Offaly senior hurling team in November 2019.

== Career statistics ==
As of match played 15 June 2024.

Team	Year	National League			Ring Cup		McDonagh Cup		Leinster		All-Ireland		Total	
Team	Year	Division	Apps	Score	Apps	Score	Apps	Score	Apps	Score	Apps	Score	Apps	Score
Offaly	2020	Division 2A	2	0-01	2	0-01	—		—		—		4	0-02
Offaly	2021	Division 2A	4	1-08	3	1-10	—		—		—		7	2-18
Offaly	2022	Division 1A	5	0-01	—		5	0-04	—		—		10	0-05
Offaly	2023	Division 2A	3	0-03	—		5	0-05	—		1	0-01	9	0-09
Offaly	2024	Division 1A	3	1-12	—		6	3-37	—		1	0-05	10	4-54
Total			17	2-25	5	1-11	16	3-46	—		2	0-06	40	6-88

== Honours ==
Offaly

- Joe McDonagh Cup: 2024
- Christy Ring Cup: 2021
- National Hurling League Division 2A: 2021, 2023
