= Charlie Mitchell (hurler) =

Irish hurler

Personal information
- Native name: Cathal Mistéil (Irish)
- Born: 30 November 2003 (age 22) Kilcormac, County Offaly, Ireland
- Occupation: Student

Sport
- Sport: Hurling
- Position: Left corner-forward
Club
- Years: Club
- Kilcormac-Killoughey
Club titles
- Offaly titles: 0
College
- Years: College
- 2022-present: University of Galway
Inter-county
- Years: County
- 2023-: Offaly
Inter-county titles
- Leinster titles: 0
- All-Irelands: 0
- NHL: 0

Charlie Mitchell (born 30 November 2003) is an Irish hurler. At club level he plays with Kilcormac-Killoughey, and has also lined out at inter-county level with various Offaly teams.

== Career ==
Mitchell first played hurling at juvenile and underage levels with the Kilcormac-Killoughey. After winning an Offaly MHC title in 2019, he later joined the club's senior team. Mitchell came on as a substitute when Kilcormac-Killoughey were beaten by Shinrone in the 2022 SHC final.

Mitchell first appeared on the inter-county scene with Offaly during a two-year tenure with the minor team. He later spent three seasons with the under-20 team and captained them to a defeat by Cork in the 2023 All-Ireland under-20 final.

By that stage, Mitchell had already appeared with the senior team after making his debut in the 2023 National League. He later lined out when Offaly were beaten by Carlow in the 2023 Joe McDonagh Cup final.

== Career statistics ==
As of 15 June 2024.

| Team | Year | National League | | | McDonagh Cup | | Leinster | | All-Ireland | | Total | |
| Team | Year | Division | Apps | Score | Apps | Score | Apps | Score | Apps | Score | Apps | Score |
|---|---|---|---|---|---|---|---|---|---|---|---|---|
| Offaly | 2023 | Division 2A | 7 | 1-11 | 5 | 1-03 | — | | 1 | 1-01 | 13 | 3-15 |
| Offaly | 2024 | Division 1A | 4 | 1-03 | 5 | 1-18 | — | | 1 | 0-01 | 10 | 3-22 |
| Career total | | | 11 | 2-14 | 10 | 2-21 | — | | 2 | 1-02 | 23 | 6-37 |

== Honours ==
University of Galway

- All-Ireland Freshers 1 Hurling Championship: 2023

Kilcormac-Killoughey

- Offaly Minor Hurling Championship: 2019

Offaly

- Joe McDonagh Cup: 2024
- National League Division 2A: 2023
- Leinster Under-20 Hurling Championship: 2023

Sporting positions
| Preceded by Jack Screeney | Offaly under-20 hurling team captain 2023 | Succeeded by Dan Bourke |
