= Aaron Dunphy =

Irish hurler

Personal information
- Native name: Aron Ó Donnchaidh (Irish)
- Born: 1998 (age 27–28) Borris-in-Ossory, County Laois, Ireland
- Occupation: Student
- Height: 6 ft 3 in (191 cm)

Sport
- Sport: Hurling
- Position: Centre-forward
Club
- Years: Club
- Borris-in-Ossory/Kilcotton
Club titles
- Laois titles: 1
College
- Years: College
- SETU Carlow
College titles
- Fitzgibbon titles: 0
Inter-county*
Years	County	Apps (scores)
2017-present	Laois	15 (2-29)
Inter-county titles
- Leinster titles: 0
- All-Irelands: 0
- NHL: 0
- All Stars: 0
- *Inter County team apps and scores correct as of 10:54, 17 June 2024.

Aaron Dunphy (born 1998) is an Irish hurler. At club level he plays with Borris-in-Ossory/Kilcotton and at inter-county level with the Laois senior hurling team.

== Career ==
Dunphy first played hurling to a high standard as a student at Mountrath Community School. He won a Rest of Leinster PPS SBHC title in 2015, before losing the subsequent All-Ireland final to Cross & Passion College from Ballycastle. Dunphy has also lined out for SETU Carlow in the Fitzgibbon Cup.

After progressing through the juvenile and underage ranks at club level, Dunphy eventually joined the Borris-in-Ossory/Kilcotton senior team. He won a Laois SHC title in 2016 after Borris beat Rathdowney–Errill in a final replay.

Dunphy first appeared on the inter-county scene with Laois during an unsuccessful two-year tenure with the minor team. He progressed to the under-21 team in 2017. Dunphy also made his senior team debut that season when he came on as substitute in a National Hurling League defeat of Offaly. He secured his first silverware in 2019 when Laois won the Joe McDonagh Cup title after a defeat of Westmeath in the final. He captained Laois to the National Hurling League Division 2A in 2024.

== Career statistics ==
As of match played 15 June 2024.

Team	Year	National League			McDonagh Cup		Leinster		All-Ireland		Total	
Team	Year	Division	Apps	Score	Apps	Score	Apps	Score	Apps	Score	Apps	Score
Laois	2017	Division 1B	5	0-04	—		4	0-07	2	0-00	11	0-11
Laois	2018	Division 1B	0	0-00	0	0-00	—		—		0	0-00
Laois	2019	Division 1B	6	0-08	5	2-09	—		2	1-04	13	3-21
Laois	2020	Division 1B	4	0-04	—		1	0-02	2	1-01	7	1-07
Laois	2021	Division 1B	6	0-03	—		1	0-00	2	0-01	9	0-04
Laois	2022	Division 1B	0	0-00	—		0	0-00	—		0	0-00
Laois	2023	Division 1B	6	1-09	2	0-06	—		—		8	1-15
Laois	2024	Division 2A	6	1-30	5	0-37	—		1	0-14	12	1-81
Total			33	2-58	12	2-52	6	0-09	9	2-20	60	6-139

== Honours ==
Mountrath Community School

- Rest of Leinster PPS Senior B Hurling Championship: 2015

Borris-in-Ossory/Kilcotton

- Laois Senior Hurling Championship: 2016

Laois

- Joe McDonagh Cup: 2019
- National Hurling League Division 2A: 2024 (c)
