= Daithí Sands =

Northern Irish hurler

Personal information
- Native name: Daithí Ó Seachnasaigh (Irish)
- Born: 1998 (age 27–28) Portaferry, County Down, Northern Ireland

Sport
- Sport: Hurling
- Position: Full-forward
Club
- Years: Club
- Portaferry
Club titles
- Down titles: 1
College
- Years: College
- Ulster University
College titles
- Fitzgibbon titles: 0
Inter-county
- Years: County
- 2018-present: Down
Inter-county titles
- Ulster titles: 0
- All-Irelands: 0
- NHL: 0
- All Stars: 0

Daithí Sands (born 1998) is a Northern Irish hurler. At club level he plays with Portaferry and at inter-county level with the Down senior hurling team.

== Career ==
McCrickard first played hurling as a student at St Patrick's Grammar School in Downpatrick. He also played hurling during his time at the University of Ulster and lined out in the Ryan Cup and Conor McGurk Cup competitions.

At club level, Sands first played for Portaferry in the various juvenile and underage grades, before later joining the club's adult team. He won a Down SHC medal after beating Ballycran in the 2020 final replay.

Sands first lined out at inter-county level with Down during a two-year stint with the minor team in 2015 and 2016. He later lined out with the under-21 team before making his Down senior hurling team debut in 2018. Sands was a back-to-back Christy Ring Cup runner-up in 2019 and 2020, however, in spite of those defeats he won a National Hurling League Division 2B medal in 2020. He was also named on the GAA/GPA Champion 15 in 2019. Sands claimed a second personal accolade in 2022 when he was selected on the Joe McDonagh Cup Team of the Year.

== Career statistics ==
As of match played 25 May 2024.

Team	Year	National League			Ring Cup		McDonagh Cup		Total	
Team	Year	Division	Apps	Score	Apps	Score	Apps	Score	Apps	Score
Down	2018	Division 2B	4	1-06	3	6-05	—		7	7-11
Down	2019	Division 2B	3	3-08	5	7-08	—		8	10-16
Down	2020	Division 2B	1	0-03	3	1-02	—		4	1-05
Down	2021	Division 2A	5	1-06	—		2	1-04	7	2-10
Down	2022	Division 2A	6	1-03	—		5	4-08	11	5-11
Down	2023	Division 2A	2	0-04	—		5	0-03	7	0-07
Down	2024	Division 2A	6	6-09	—		5	5-08	11	11-17
Total			27	12-39	11	14-15	17	10-23	55	36-77

== Honours ==
=== Team ===
Portaferry

- Down Senior Hurling Championship: 2020

Down

- National Hurling League Division 2B: 2020

=== Individual ===
Awards

- Joe McDonagh Cup Team of the Year: 2022
- GAA/GPA Champion 15: 2019
