= 2024 National Hurling League =

2024 hurling tournament in Ireland and England

League details
- Dates: 3 February – 6 April 2024
- Teams: 35

League champions
- Winners: Clare (5th win)
- Captain: Conor Cleary
- Manager: Brian Lohan

League runners-up
- Runners-up: Kilkenny
- Captain: Paddy Deegan
- Manager: Derek Lyng

Other division winners
- Division 2A: Laois
- Division 2B: Derry
- Division 3A: Mayo
- Division 3B: Warwickshire

The 2024 National Hurling League (NHL), known for sponsorship reasons as the Allianz Hurling League (AHL), was the 93rd season of the National Hurling League, an annual hurling competition held in Ireland for county teams. Three English county teams also feature.

On 6 April, Clare defeated Kilkenny by 3-16 to 1-20 to win the final.

== Format ==
League structure

Thirty-five teams compete in the 2024 NHL –

- twelve teams organised in two six-team groups of approximately equal strength in Division 1
- six teams in Divisions 2A, 2B and 3A
- five teams in Division 3B.

All thirty-two county teams from Ireland take part. London, Lancashire and Warwickshire complete the lineup.

Teams by Province and Division
Province	Div 1	Div 2A	Div 2B	Div 3A	Div 3B	Total
Connacht	1	0	1	2	1	5
Leinster	5	4	1	1	1	12
Munster	5	1	0	0	0	6
Ulster	1	1	3	3	1	9
Britain	0	0	1	0	2	3
Total	12	6	6	6	5	35

Each team plays all the other teams in their group or division once, either home or away. Two points are awarded for a win, and one for a draw.

Tie-breaker

- If only two teams are level on league points, the team that won the head-to-head match is ranked ahead. If this game was a draw, score difference (total scored minus total conceded in all games) is used to rank the teams.
- If three or more teams are level on league points, score difference is used to rank the teams.

Finals, promotions and relegations

Division 1

- The top two teams in each group play in the NHL semi-finals and final.
- The top three teams in each group are placed in Division 1A for the 2025 NHL.
- The fourth-placed team with the better record is placed in Division 1A for 2025, with the worse fourth-placed team in Division 1B.
- The fifth- and sixth-placed teams go into Division 1B.

Division 2A

- Second and third-placed teams meet in the Division 2A semi-final
- Semi-final winner plays first-placed team in the Division 2A final
- The two finalists play in Division 1B for 2025
- The other four teams are placed in Division 2 for 2025

Division 2B

- Second and third-placed teams meet in the Division 2B semi-final
- Semi-final winner plays first-placed team in the Division 2B final
- Top three teams are placed in Division 2 for 2025
- Bottom three teams are relegated to Division 3 for 2025

Division 3A

- Second and third-placed teams meet in the Division 3A semi-final
- Semi-final winner plays first-placed team in the Division 3A final
- Top four teams are placed in Division 3 for 2025
- Bottom two teams are relegated to Division 4 for 2025

Division 3B

- Second and third-placed teams meet in the Division 3B semi-final
- Semi-final winner plays first-placed team in the Division 3B final
- All teams are relegated to Division 4 for 2025

For the 2025 NHL season, the teams will be in five divisions of seven teams - Divisions 1A, 1B, 2, 3 and 4.

== Division 1 ==
Locations of the 2024 NHL Division 1 teams.
Red: Group A; Green: Group B.

=== Division 1 Format ===
The top twelve teams compete in Division 1 in two six-team groups of approximately equal strength. This group structure was introduced in 2020; the groups were redrawn for 2022 and 2023.

Each team play all the other teams in their group once. Two points are awarded for a win and one for a draw. The top two teams in each group qualify for the NHL semi-finals.

=== Division 1 Group A Table ===
NHL semi-finals and qualify for Division 1A for 2025 Qualify for Division 1A for 2025 Relegated to Division 1B

Team	Pld	W	D	L	F	A	Diff	Pts
Clare	5	4	1	0	106	98	8	9
Kilkenny	5	3	1	1	106	98	8	7
Cork	5	3	0	2	142	105	37	6
Wexford	5	1	3	1	105	114	-9	5
Waterford	5	1	0	4	111	108	3	2
Offaly	5	0	1	4	97	144	-47	1

=== Division 1 Group A Rounds 1 to 5 ===
==== Division 1 Group A Round 1 ====
4 February 2024; Round 1	Offaly	0-17 - 3-20	Waterford	Glenisk O'Connor Park; Referee: K Jordan (Tipperary)
4 February 2024; Round 1	E Cahill (0-6, 6f), B Duignan (0-5, 4f), E Kelly (0-2), K Sampson, J Sampson, C Kiely and D Nally (0-1 each).	Report	Stephen Bennett (2-4, 3f), S Walsh (1-1), P Curran and S Fitzgerald (0-3 each), M Kiely and N Montgomery (0-2 each), Pádraig Fitzgerald, K Bennett, J Prendergast, J Fagan, and C Sheehan (0-1 each).	Glenisk O'Connor Park; Referee: K Jordan (Tipperary)

4 February 2024; Round 1	Clare	1-25 - 2-19	Cork	Cusack Park; Attendance: 7,380; Referee: M Kennedy (Tipperary)
4 February 2024; Round 1	M Rodgers 0-13 (0-10 f, 0-1 65), S Morey 1-1, D Fitzgerald, D Reidy, R Mounsey, C Malone 0-2 each, D McInerney, S Meehan, G Sheedy 0-1 each.	Report	P Horgan 1-7 (0-7 f), S Kingston 0-3, T O’Connell 1-0, C Lehane, S Barrett 0-2 each, S Twomey, R O’Flynn, C O’Brien, S O’Donoghue, C Joyce 0-1 each.	Cusack Park; Attendance: 7,380; Referee: M Kennedy (Tipperary)

4 February 2024; Round 1	Kilkenny	2-16 - 2-16	Wexford	UPMC Nowlan Park; Attendance: 8,224; Referee: T Gleeson (Dublin)
4 February 2024; Round 1	B Drennan (2-3, goals penalties, points frees); E Cody (0-7, five frees, one 65); A Mullen (0-2); C Kenny, K Blanchfield, B Ryan, M Keoghan (0-1 each).	Report	S Casey (1-2); C Byrne (1-1); L Chin (0-4, frees); C Foley, C Molloy, T Kinsella (0-2 each); C Byrne Dunbar, K Foley, J Byrne (0-1 each);	UPMC Nowlan Park; Attendance: 8,224; Referee: T Gleeson (Dublin)

==== Division 1 Group A Round 2 ====
10 February 2024; Round 2	Cork	1-17 - 0-21	Kilkenny	SuperValu Páirc Uí Chaoimh; Attendance: 16,274; Referee: J Murphy (Limerick)
10 February 2024; Round 2	P Horgan (0-9, frees); C Lehane (0-4); C O’Callaghan (1-0); T O’Connell, T O’Mahony, R O’Flynn, S Barrett (0-1 each).	Report	E Cody (0-7, 5 frees); A Mullen (0-5); B Drennan (0-3, 2 frees); C Kenny, J Donnelly (0-2 each); M Carey, S Murphy (0-1 each).	SuperValu Páirc Uí Chaoimh; Attendance: 16,274; Referee: J Murphy (Limerick)

10 February 2024; Round 2	Wexford	0-20 - 1-17	Offaly	Chadwicks Wexford Park; Attendance: 3,664; Referee: S Stack (Dublin)
10 February 2024; Round 2	L Chin (0-9, 8f), R Lawlor (0-2), S Casey (0-2), C Byrne (0-1), C Molloy (0-1); M Fanning (0-1 free), C Byrne-Dunbar (0-1), T Kinsella (0-1), C McGuickin (0-1), J Byrne (0-1).	Report	B Duignan 1-7 (0-2 ‘65s, 0-4 frees), C Kiely, D King 0-2 each, B Conneely, A Screeney, K Sampson, C Mitchell, D Bourke, C King 0-1 each.	Chadwicks Wexford Park; Attendance: 3,664; Referee: S Stack (Dublin)

11 February 2024; Round 2	Waterford	1-16 - 0-20	Clare	Walsh Park; Attendance: 3,951; Referee: L Gordon (Galway)
11 February 2024; Round 2	Stephen Bennett 0-6 (6fs), S Walsh 1-1, P Curran, C Ryan, Shane Bennett (2fs) 0-2 each, J Prendergast, P Leavy, D Lyons 0-1 each.	Report	A McCarthy 0-8 (6fs), S Rynne, I Galvin, C Galvin, P Crotty 0-2 each, C Malone, D Fitzgerald, D Reidy, S Meehan 0-1 each.	Walsh Park; Attendance: 3,951; Referee: L Gordon (Galway)

==== Division 1 Group A Round 3 ====
25 February 2024; Round 3	Cork	1-21 - 1-19	Waterford	SuperValu Páirc Uí Chaoimh; Attendance: 10,622; Referee: J Owens (Wexford)
25 February 2024; Round 3	P Horgan (0-7, 6 frees); J O’Connor (1-3); B Hayes (0-3); S Harnedy (0-2); C Joyce, G Millerick, T O’Connell, R Downey, A Connolly (0-1 free), E Downey (0-1 each).	Report	J Prendergast (0-5, 0-4 frees); C Lyons (0-4, 0-2 frees); P Leavey (0-3); S Walsh (1-0); C Sheehan (0-2); T Barron, B Nolan, P Curran, M Kiely, J Barron (0-1 each).	SuperValu Páirc Uí Chaoimh; Attendance: 10,622; Referee: J Owens (Wexford)

25 February 2024; Round 3	Kilkenny	1-26 - 1-19	Offaly	UPMC Nowlan Park; Attendance: 3,523; Referee: M Kennedy (Tipperary)
25 February 2024; Round 3	B Drennan (0-11, 8fs and 2 65's), A Mullen (0-6), E Cody (1-1), J Donnelly (0-2), D Brennan (0-1, 1f), D Blanchfield, S Murphy, K Blanchfield, T Clifford, W Walsh (0-1 each).	Report	E Cahill (0-10, 9fs), C Mitchell (1-2), D Ravenhill (0-2), J Sampson, C Kiely, E Kelly, J Clancy, A Screeney (0-1 each).	UPMC Nowlan Park; Attendance: 3,523; Referee: M Kennedy (Tipperary)

25 February 2024; Round 3	Wexford	1-13 - 0-16	Clare	Chadwicks Wexford Park; Attendance: 4,386; Referee: T Walsh (Waterford)
25 February 2024; Round 3	S Casey 1-4 (1-0 penalty, 0-2 frees), L Chin 0-3 (1 free), C Hearne, C Dunbar, C Byrne-Dunbar, M Fanning (free), J Doran, J O’Connor 0-1 each	Report	D Fitzgerald 0-5, A McCarthy 0-4 (3 frees), M Rodgers 0-2 (1 free), I Galvin, P Crotty, R Mounsey, S Meehan, P Duggan 0-1 each	Chadwicks Wexford Park; Attendance: 4,386; Referee: T Walsh (Waterford)

==== Division 1 Group A Round 4 ====
10 March 2024; Round 4	Offaly	0-16 - 5-28	Cork	Glenisk O'Connor Park; Referee: C Cunning (Antrim)
10 March 2024; Round 4	D Nally (0-8, 6 frees, 1 65); E Cahill (0-5, 4 frees); D Ravenhill, S Bourke, D Bourke (0-1 each).	Report	A Connolly (3-1); D Dalton (0-7, 4 frees, 2 65s); B Hayes, D Fitzgibbon (1-1 each); S Kingston (0-4, 2 frees); R Downey (0-3): J O’Connor, B Roche, C Lehane, L Meade, S Barrett (0-2 each); S Harnedy (0-1).	Glenisk O'Connor Park; Referee: C Cunning (Antrim)

10 March 2024; Round 4	Clare	0-19 - 0-16	Kilkenny	Cusack Park; Attendance: 6,824; Referee: J Owens (Wexford)
10 March 2024; Round 4	A McCarthy (0-6, frees); D Fitzgerald (0-5); K Smyth (0-2); P Duggan (0-2); C Leen (0-1); D Reidy (0-1); M Rodgers (0-1 free); D Ryan (0-1).	Report	TJ Reid (0-9 frees); J Donnelly (0-3); P Deegan (0-2); D Blanchfield (0-1), E Cody (0-1).	Cusack Park; Attendance: 6,824; Referee: J Owens (Wexford)

10 March 2024; Round 4	Waterford	1-23 - 2-23	Wexford	Walsh Park; Attendance: 3,500; Referee: C Lyons (Cork)
10 March 2024; Round 4	Shane Bennett (0-6, 0-5 frees); Padraig Fitzgerald (1-2, 0-1 free); J Barron (0-4); J Prendergast, C Lyons (0-3 each); P Leavey (0-2 frees); N Montgomery, B Nolan, M Kiely (0-1 each).	Report	S Casey (0-9, 0-6 frees); C Byrne (0-5); C Hearne, S Donohoe (1-1 each); C Byrne Dunbar (0-1 free), K Foley (0-2); D Reck, M O’Hanlon, R Lawlor (0-1 each).	Walsh Park; Attendance: 3,500; Referee: C Lyons (Cork)

==== Division 1 Group A Round 5 ====
16 March 2024; Round 5	Offaly	1-19 - 0-23	Clare	Grant Heating St Brendan's Park; Referee: C Flynn (Westmeath)
16 March 2024; Round 5	E Cahill 0-10 (0-8f, 1 ’65), J Clancy 1-0, L Watkins and S Bourke 0-2 each, D Nally, L Fox, D King, E Kelly and D Maher 0-1 each.	Report	D Conroy 0-5 (0-3f), I Galvin 0-4, P Crotty and D Reidy (0-2) 0-3 each, S Meehan, K Smyth (0-2f) and S Morey 0-2 each, R Hayes and P Donnellan 0-1 each.	Grant Heating St Brendan's Park; Referee: C Flynn (Westmeath)

16 March 2024; Round 5	Waterford	2-09 - 0-18	Kilkenny	Walsh Park
16 March 2024; Round 5	D Hutchinson 1-1, Shane Bennett 0-4 (3fs), P Curran 1-0, P Fitzgerald, J Prendergast, M Fitzgerald, J Barron 0-1 each.	Report	TJ Reid 0-8 (8fs), E Cody 0-3, L Hogan, J Donnelly 0-2 each, B Ryan, K Blanchfield, M Keoghan 0-1 each.	Walsh Park

16 March 2024; Round 5	Wexford	1-15 - 3-21	Cork	Chadwicks Wexford Park; Referee: L Gordon (Galway)
16 March 2024; Round 5	S Casey (1-9, 0-7 frees); M Fanning (0-3 frees); D Carley (0-2); C Foley (0-1).	Report	A Connolly (3-2, 1-0 pen); P Horgan (0-8, 0-7 frees); B Hayes (0-2); P Collins, C Joyce, R Downey, T O’Connell, S Harnedy, S Kingston (0-1 free), C Lehane, L Meade, S Barrett (0-1 each).	Chadwicks Wexford Park; Referee: L Gordon (Galway)

=== Division 1 Group B Table ===
NHL semi-finals and qualify for Division 1A for 2025 Qualify for Division 1A for 2025 Relegated to Division 1B

Team	Pld	W	D	L	F	A	Diff	Pts
Limerick	5	4	1	0	144	92	52	9
Tipperary	5	4	0	1	148	111	37	8
Galway	5	3	1	1	151	92	59	7
Dublin	5	2	0	3	112	135	-23	4
Westmeath	5	1	0	4	95	146	-51	2
Antrim	5	0	0	5	80	154	-74	0

=== Division 1 Group B Rounds 1 to 5 ===
==== Division 1 Group B Round 1 ====
3 February 2024; Round 1	Dublin	0-22 - 2-27	Tipperary	Parnell Park; Referee: S Hynes (Galway)
3 February 2024; Round 1	C O'Sullivan 0-11 (0-8f, 0-1 s/l), F Whitely 0-3, C Burke 0-2, S Currie 0-2, B Hayes 0-1, J Malone 0-1, D O Dulaing 0-1, P Crummey 0-1.	Report	G O'Connor 0-12 (0-8f, 0-1 65, 0-1 s/l), J Morris 1-4, S Ryan 1-0, E Connolly 0-2, R Shelly 0-1 (0-1f), W Connors 0-1, B O'Mara 0-1, C Bowe 0-1, C Morgan 0-1, A Tynan 0-1, J McGrath 0-1, A Ormond 0-1, J Fogarty 0-1.	Parnell Park; Referee: S Hynes (Galway)

3 February 2024; Round 1	Galway	4-31 - 0-14	Westmeath	Pearse Stadium; Referee: S Stack (Dublin)
3 February 2024; Round 1	E Niland 0-11 (0-6f, 0-1 ’65), J Flynn 2-2 (0-1f), T Monaghan 0-5, C Fahy 1-1, G Lee 0-4, C Whelan 1-0, D O’Shea 0-2, D McLoughlin 0-2, J Cooney 0-1, D Morrissey 0-1, J Ryan 0-1, R Glennon 0-1.	Report	D Williams 0-7 (0-6f), D O’Reilly 0-2, D Clinton 0-1, N Mitchell 0-1, M Cunningham 0-1.	Pearse Stadium; Referee: S Stack (Dublin)

4 February 2024; Round 1	Limerick	1-36 - 1-09	Antrim	FBD Semple Stadium; Referee: T Walsh (Waterford)
4 February 2024; Round 1	A English 0-10 (4fs), S O'Brien 1-6, D O Dalaigh 0-7, G Hegarty 0-3, C O'Neill 0-2, D Reidy 0-2, M Houlihan 0-2, G Mulcahy 0-2, M Quinlan 0-1, P O'Donovan 0-1.	Report	F McCurry 1-1, C Cunning 0-4 (4fs), N O'Connor, S Walsh, A Bradley, R McMullan 0-1 each.	FBD Semple Stadium; Referee: T Walsh (Waterford)

==== Division 1 Group B Round 2 ====
11 February 2024; Round 2	Tipperary	1-26 - 0-24	Galway	FBD Semple Stadium; Attendance: 5,941; Referee: C Lyons (Cork)
11 February 2024; Round 2	G O’Connor (1-13, 1-0 pen, 8 frees, 1 65); M Kehoe (0-3); W Connors, C Bowe (0-2 each); J McGrath, A Tynan, J Morris, S Kenneally, C Morgan, S Kennedy (0-1 each).	Report	E Niland (0-10, 9 frees); C Cooney (0-5); T Monaghan, C Whelan, G Lee (0-2 each); D O’Shea, C Fahy, S Linnane (0-1 each).	FBD Semple Stadium; Attendance: 5,941; Referee: C Lyons (Cork)

11 February 2024; Round 2	Westmeath	0-17 - 1-20	Limerick	TEG Cusack Park; Referee: C Cunning (Antrim)
11 February 2024; Round 2	D Williams 0-10 (nine frees), N Mitchell, J Boyle 0-2 each, S McGovern, C Doyle, D O'Reilly 0-1 each.	Report	D Ó Dálaigh 1-4, M Houlihan 0-4 (two frees), D Reidy, T Morrissey (one free) 0-2 each, D O'Donovan, C O'Neill, S Flanagan, G Mulcahy, C Boylan, G Hegarty, P O'Donovan, M Quinlan 0-1 each.	TEG Cusack Park; Referee: C Cunning (Antrim)

11 February 2024; Round 2	Antrim	1-19 - 1-20	Dublin	Corrigan Park; Referee: C Flynn (Westmeath)
11 February 2024; Round 2	C Cunning 1-10 (0-6f, -01 65), S Walsh 0-2, N McKenna 0-1, P Burke 0-1, E Campbell 0-1, R McMullan 0-1, F McCurry 0-1, J McLaughlin 0-1, A Bradley 0-1	Report	C O'Sullivan 0-5 (3f), T Smyth (OG) 1-0, B Hayes 0-3, C Currie 0-3 (3f), F Whitely 0-2, C Burke 0-2, C Donohoe 0-1, S Currie 0-1 D Ó Dúlaing 0-1, R Smith 0-1, P Crummey 0-1	Corrigan Park; Referee: C Flynn (Westmeath)

==== Division 1 Group B Round 3 ====
24 February 2024; Round 3	Dublin	1-18 - 3-30	Limerick	Croke Park; Attendance: 36,807; Referee: K Jordan (Tipperary)
24 February 2024; Round 3	C O'Sullivan 0-5 (0-3f), D Burke 0-5 (0-4f, 0-1 65), S Currie 1-0, D Sutcliffe 0-3, C Burke 0-2, C Donohoe 0-1, R Hayes 0-1, D O'Dulaing 0-1.	Report	A English 0-8 (0-3f), D O Dalaigh 2-1, T Morrissey 1-4, G Hegarty 0-5, C O'Neill 0-4, D Byrnes 0-2, M Houlihan 0-2, K Hayes 0-1, B Murphy 0-1, F O'Connor 0-1, S O'Brien 0-1.	Croke Park; Attendance: 36,807; Referee: K Jordan (Tipperary)

24 February 2024; Round 3	Tipperary	3-25 - 2-21	Westmeath	FBD Semple Stadium; Attendance: 1,962; Referee: S Cleere (Kilkenny)
24 February 2024; Round 3	J Forde (0-12, 11 frees); M Kehoe (2-1); C Stakelum (0-6); N Conaty (1-0 own goal); N McGrath (0-3); C Quinn, S Hayes, J Campion (0-1 each).	Report	D Williams (2-12, 0-7 frees, 0-2 65s); K Doyle (1 free), D O’Reilly (0-2 each); T Doyle, P Clarke, J Boyle, N Mitchell, C Doyle (0-1 each).	FBD Semple Stadium; Attendance: 1,962; Referee: S Cleere (Kilkenny)

25 February 2024; Round 3	Antrim	1-13 - 2-35	Galway	Corrigan Park; Referee: T Gleeson (Dublin)
25 February 2024; Round 3	J McLaughlin (1-0), E Campbell, P Burke, C Cunning (1f), C McCann (0-2 each), R McMullan, N O'Connor, R McGarry, N McKenna, C McGarry (0-1 each).	Report	E Niland (0-13, 10f), J Flynn (2-1), T Monaghan (0-6), C Cooney (0-4), S Linnane (0-3), C Fahy, C Whelan, J Ryan (0-2 each), G Lee, J Cooney (0-1).	Corrigan Park; Referee: T Gleeson (Dublin)

==== Division 1 Group B Round 4 ====
9 March 2024; Round 4	Westmeath	2-18 - 1-15	Antrim	TEG Cusack Park; Referee: S Hynes (Galway)
9 March 2024; Round 4	D Williams 0-8 (5f, 2 65s), E Keyes 1-2, D Glennon 1-1, D O’Reilly, K Doyle 0-2 each, P Clarke, R Greville, J Boyle 0-1 each.	Report	C Cunning 0-7 (5f), N McKenna 1-1, C McCann, N O’Connor, E Campbell 0-2 each, E McFerran 0-1.	TEG Cusack Park; Referee: S Hynes (Galway)

9 March 2024; Round 4	Limerick	0-26 - 3-16	Tipperary	SuperValu Páirc Uí Chaoimh; Attendance: 5,605; Referee: L Gordon (Galway)
9 March 2024; Round 4	A Gillane (0-8, 7 frees); D Byrnes (1 free), D Ó Dálaigh (0-3 each); C Coughlan, G Hegarty, C Lynch (0-2 each); M Casey, C Boylan, A English, S Flanagan, T Morrissey (free), G Mulcahy (0-1 each).	Report	J Forde (1-7, 0-3 frees); J Morris (1-3); P Maher (1-0); G O’Connor (0-3); C Morgan, A Tynan, S Ryan (0-1 each).	SuperValu Páirc Uí Chaoimh; Attendance: 5,605; Referee: L Gordon (Galway)

10 March 2024; Round 4	Galway	1-23 - 1-15	Dublin	Pearse Stadium; Referee: J Murphy (Limerick)
10 March 2024; Round 4	C Cooney 0-11 (0-10 frees), T Monaghan 0-4, C Whelan 1-0, J Cooney 0-3, G Lee 0-2, D Burke 0-1, C Fahy 0-1, C Mannion 0-1.	Report	D Burke 1-9 (1-0 pen, 0-6f, 0-2 ‘65s), C O’Sullivan 0-3, D Ó Dúlaing 0-1, C Donoghue 0-1, R Hayes 0-1.	Pearse Stadium; Referee: J Murphy (Limerick)

==== Division 1 Group B Round 5 ====
16 March 2024; Round 5	Antrim	0-12 - 2-21	Tipperary	Corrigan Park; Referee: C Mooney (Dublin)
16 March 2024; Round 5	A O'Brien 0-8 (7f), N McKenna 0-3, R McAteer 0-1	Report	J Forde 0-12 (8f, 1 65), J Morris 2-2, S Kenneally 0-2, E Connolly 0-1, B O'Mara 0-1, D Slattery 0-1, D McCormack 0-1, D Stakelum 0-1	Corrigan Park; Referee: C Mooney (Dublin)

16 March 2024; Round 5	Dublin	2-22 - 0-15	Westmeath	Parnell Park
16 March 2024; Round 5	C O'Sullivan 1-4 (2fs, 1'65'), J Madden, D Sutcliffe, P Crummey, D Burke (2fs) 0-3 each, F Whiteley 1-0, B Hayes, M Grogan 0-2 each, D Leavy, J Malone 0-1 each.	Report	D Williams 0-7 (7fs), P Clarke, K Doyle 0-2 each, D Glennon, A Clarke, T Doyle, S McGovern 0-1 each.	Parnell Park

16 March 2024; Round 5	Galway	0-17 - 0-17	Limerick	Pearse Stadium; Referee: T Walsh (Waterford)
16 March 2024; Round 5	E Niland (0-6, 4fs), C Mannion (0-4), S Linnane; G Lee (0-2), R Glennon (0-2); D Burke (0-1), P Mannion (0-1); A Tuohey (0-1).	Report	D Byrnes (0-5, 5fs), A English (0-5), T Morrissey (0-2); A Gillane (0-2, 2fs), G Hegarty (0-1), D Reidy (0-1), S O’Brien (0-1).	Pearse Stadium; Referee: T Walsh (Waterford)

=== Comparison of fourth-placed teams ===
Qualify for Division 1A for 2025 Relegated to Division 1B

Group	Team	Pld	W	D	L	F	A	Diff	Pts
A	Wexford	5	1	3	1	105	114	-9	5
B	Dublin	5	2	0	3	112	135	-23	4

=== Division 1 Semi-Finals ===
23 March 2024; Semi-final	Limerick	1-15 - 3-17	Kilkenny	SuperValu Páirc Uí Chaoimh; Referee: J Owens (Wexford)
23 March 2024; Semi-final	A Gillane (1-5, 0-3 frees); T Morrissey (0-2 frees), D Reidy (free), C O’Neill (0-2 each); D Byrnes (0-1 free), G Hegarty, D Ó Dálaigh, P Casey (0-1 each).	Report	TJ Reid (1-8, 0-6 frees, 0-1 ‘65); B Drennan (0-1 free, 0-1 ‘65), A Mullen (0-3 each); E Cody, L Hogan (1-0 each); C Buckley, B Ryan, M Keoghan (0-1 each).	SuperValu Páirc Uí Chaoimh; Referee: J Owens (Wexford)

24 March 2024; Semi-final	Clare	1-24 - 2-13	Tipperary	Laois Hire O'Moore Park; Referee: L Gordon (Galway)
24 March 2024; Semi-final	A McCarthy (0-8, 6 frees, 1 65); D Fitzgerald (1-3); M Rodgers (frees), D Reidy (0-3 each); K Smyth (0-2); D Ryan, D Lohan, A Hogan C Malone, C Galvin (0-1 each).	Report	J Forde (0-6, 5 frees); J Morris (1-2); S Hayes (1-0); D McCormack, A Tynan, W Connors, S Kenneally, S Ryan (free) (0-1 each).	Laois Hire O'Moore Park; Referee: L Gordon (Galway)

=== Division 1 Final ===
6 April 2024; 19:15; Final	Clare	3-16 - 1-20	Kilkenny	FBD Semple Stadium; Attendance: 12,307; Referee: J Murphy (Limerick)
6 April 2024; 19:15; Final	A McCarthy (2-10, 0-9 frees); D Fitzgerald (1-0); M Rodgers (0-2); D Lohan, D Ryan, I Galvin, C Malone (0-1 each).	Report	E Cody (1-4, 0-3 frees); M Keoghan (0-4); A Mullen (0-3); C Kenny (0-2); B Drennan (free), S Murphy, B Ryan, L Blanchfield, R Reid, J Molloy, J Donnelly (0-1 each).	FBD Semple Stadium; Attendance: 12,307; Referee: J Murphy (Limerick)

=== Division 1 scoring statistics ===
Overall

Rank	Player	Club	Tally	Total	Matches	Average
1	David Williams	Westmeath	2-44	50	5	10.00
2	Aidan McCarthy	Clare	2-36	42	6	7.00
3	Jason Forde	Tipperary	1-37	40	4	10.00
3	Evan Niland	Galway	0-40	40	4	10.00
5	Séamus Casey	Wexford	3-26	35	5	7.00
6	Patrick Horgan	Cork	1-31	34	4	8.50
7	Eoin Cody	Kilkenny	3-23	32	7	4.57
8	Gearóid O'Connor	Tipperary	1-28	31	4	7.75
8	Cian O'Sullivan	Dublin	1-28	31	5	6.20
8	Eoghan Cahill	Dublin	0-31	31	4	7.75

In a single game

Rank	Player	Team	Tally	Total	Opposition
1	David Williams	Westmeath	2-12	18	Tipperary
2	Aidan McCarthy	Clare	2-10	16	Kilkenny
3	Gearóid O'Connor	Tipperary	1-13	16	Galway
4	Conal Cunning	Antrim	1-10	13	Dublin
4	Evan Niland	Galway	0-13	13	Antrim
4	Mark Rodgers	Clare	0-13	13	Cork
7	Séamus Casey	Wexford	1-09	12	Cork
7	Donal Burke	Dublin	1-09	12	Galway
7	Gearóid O'Connor	Tipperary	0-12	12	Dublin
7	Jason Forde	Tipperary	0-12	12	Westmeath
7	Jason Forde	Tipperary	0-12	12	Antrim

== Division 2A ==
=== Division 2A Table ===
Division Final and promoted to Division 1B Division Semi-Final, winner promoted to Division 1B

Team	Pld	W	D	L	F	A	Diff	Pts
Carlow (P)	5	4	0	1	132	102	30	8
Laois (P)	5	4	0	1	146	103	43	8
Down	5	2	1	2	125	121	4	5
Kildare	5	2	1	2	116	116	0	5
Kerry	5	1	0	4	103	132	-29	2
Meath	5	1	0	4	95	143	-48	2

=== Division 2A Rounds 1 to 5 ===
==== Division 2A Round 1 ====
4 February 2024; Round 1	Meath	2-20 - 3-14	Kildare	Páirc Tailteann
4 February 2024; Round 1	N Potterton 2-1, P O'Hanrahan 0-7 (6 frees, one 65), J Toher 0-4 (1 s/l), S Martin 0-2, J Murray 0-1, T Shine 0-1, N McLarnon 0-1, S Ennis 0-1, S Geraghty 0-1, D Shine 0-1.	Report	J Sheridan 0-7 (5 frees, two 65s), Cian Boran 1-1, C Kehoe 1-1, J Burke 1-0, J Higgins 0-2, M Curtin 0-2, R Boran 0-1.	Páirc Tailteann

4 February 2024; Round 1	Laois	2-18 - 0-17	Down	Laois Hire O'Moore Park
4 February 2024; Round 1	J Quinlan 1-03, S Maher 0-6 (four frees, one 65), A Dunphy and W Dunphy 0-3 each, M Dowling 1-0, T Cuddy 0-2, C Comerford 0-1.	Report	P Og McCrickard 0-7 (five frees), T Prenter 0-4, F Turpin 0-2, D Hughes, E Sands, D Sands and P Sheehan 0-1 each.	Laois Hire O'Moore Park

4 February 2024; Round 1	Kerry	0-19 - 3-22	Carlow	Austin Stack Park
4 February 2024; Round 1	F Mackessy (0-4), D Goggin (0-3), N Mulcahy, B Barrett (0-3fs) each, M O’Connor (0-2), D Shanahan, F O’Sullivan, M Leane, D Griffin (0-1 each).	Report	M Kavanagh (1-9, 5fs), C Nolan (1-6), C Kehoe (0-4), F Fitzpatrick (1-0), K McDonald (0-2, 1f), J M Nolan (0-1).	Austin Stack Park

==== Division 2A Round 2 ====
10 February 2024; Round 2	Down	2-23 - 1-19	Kerry	McKenna Park
10 February 2024; Round 2	P Óg McCrickard (0-9, 0-5 frees), D Sands and D Toner ( 1-1each), T Prenter and T McGrattan ( 0-3 each), C Taggart, D Hughes, R McCrickard, C Egan, P Sheehan and E Sands ( 0-1 each)	Report	M O’Connor (0-5, 0-4 frees), D Goggin and F Mackessy (0-3, 2fs) 0-3 each, G Dooley ( 1-0), G Dooley and N Mulcahy ( 0-2 each), D Shanahan, K O’Connor, K Hayes and R Walsh ( 0-1 each).	McKenna Park

11 February 2024; Round 2	Kildare	1-20 - 3-22	Laois	Hawkfield COE
11 February 2024; Round 2	J Sheridan 1-13 (0-7 frees), J Burke 0-3, S Leacy 0-1, Conan Boran 0-1, Cian Boran 0-1, C Kehoe 0-1.	Report	S Maher 0-7 (0-6 frees), J Duggan 1-1, M Dowling 1-0, S Bergin 1-0, E Rowland 0-2 (0-2 frees), P Purcell 0-2, M Phelan 0-2, P Delaney 0-2, J Quinlan 0-2, T Cuddy 0-1, D Dooley 0-1, C Comerford 0-1, A Dunphy 0-1 (0-1 65').	Hawkfield COE

11 February 2024; Round 2	Carlow	3-22 - 1-16	Meath	Netwatch Cullen Park
11 February 2024; Round 2	M Kavanagh 1-6 five frees, one '65’; C Nolan 0-6; JM Nolan 1-2; C Kehoe 1-2; J Doyle 0-2; J Nolan 0-2; J Doyle 0-1; S Treacy 0-1.	Report	P O’Hanrahan 0-9 seven frees; N Potterton 1-1; J Toher 0-3; S Martin 0-3.	Netwatch Cullen Park

==== Division 2A Round 3 ====
24 February 2024; Round 3	Laois	0-21 - 1-23	Carlow	Laois Hire O'Moore Park
24 February 2024; Round 3	S Maher (0-8, 0-7f, 0-1 65), P Purcell (0-4), D Dooley (0-2), E Rowland (0-2f), J Quinlan (0-1), A Dunphy (0-1), T Cuddy (0-1), M Phelan (0-1), A Corby (0-1).	Report	M Kavanagh (0-10f), S Treacy (1-1), C Nolan (0-4), JM Nolan (0-3), F Fitzpatrick (0-2), C Kehoe (0-1), J Doyle (0-1), K McDonald (0-1).	Laois Hire O'Moore Park

25 February 2024; Round 3	Kerry	3-14 - 0-16	Meath	Austin Stack Park
25 February 2024; Round 3	S Conway (1-9, 7s), D Goggin and M Leane (1-0 each), T Doyle, D Griffin, N Mulcahy, M O’Connor and R Walsh (0-1 each).	Report	P O’Hanrahan (0-8,5fs), N Potterton (0-3), S Quigley (0-2), D Shine, J Murray and T Shine (0-1 each).	Austin Stack Park

25 February 2024; Round 3	Down	1-24 - 1-24	Kildare	McKenna Park
25 February 2024; Round 3	P Óg McCrickard 0-10 (7 frees), M Fisher 1-2 (1 penalty); D Toner 0-3, D Hughes 0-2, D Sands 0-2; E Sands 0-2, C Egan 0-1, T Prenter 0-1; R McCrickard 0-1.	Report	J Sheridan 1-12 (12 frees), J Burke 0-4, S Leacy 0-3, C Kehoe 0-1, H Carroll 0-1, C Boran 0-1, M Curtin 0-1, D Flaherty 0-1.	McKenna Park

==== Division 2A Round 4 ====
9 March 2024; Round 4	Kildare	1-21 - 1-14	Kerry	Hawkfield COE; Referee: S Cleere (Kilkenny)
9 March 2024; Round 4	D Qualter (0-9, 7 frees, 1’65), P McKenna (1-1, 1-0 pen, 1 free), J Burke (0-3, 1 free), Cian Boran (0-3), D Flaherty (0-2), M Curtin (0-1), J Higgins (0-1), S Leacy (0-1)	Report	M O’Connor (1-7, 4 frees, 1’65), F Mackessy (0-2, 1 free), K O’Connor (0-1), D Goggin (0-1), K Hayes (0-1), M Leane (0-1), G Dooley (0-1)	Hawkfield COE; Referee: S Cleere (Kilkenny)

10 March 2024; Round 4	Carlow	3-20 - 2-18	Down	Netwatch Cullen Park; Referee: S Stack (Dublin)
10 March 2024; Round 4	M Kavanagh 1-7 (1-0pen, 6fs), J Nolan 0-5, James Doyle 1-1, Jake Doyle 1-0, C Nolan 0-3, J McCullagh 0-1, JM Nolan 0-1, F Fitzpatrick 0-1	Report	D Sands 2-1, P Og McCrickard 0-5 (4fs), T Prenter 0-4, P Sheehan 0-3fs, L Savage 0-3, D Hughes 0-1, P Savage 0-1.	Netwatch Cullen Park; Referee: S Stack (Dublin)

10 March 2024; Round 4	Meath	1-21 - 4-26	Laois	Páirc Tailteann; Referee: N Malone (Clare)
10 March 2024; Round 4	P O’Hanrahan (1-5 (4f, 0-1 65)); S Geraghty (0-1), N Potterton (0-1), S Ennis (0-1), K Gorman (0-1), J Murray (0-1), J Walsh (0-1), J Toher (0-1).	Report	A Dunphy (1-10 (5f, 0-1 65)), M Phelan (1-2), T Keyes (1-2), J Quinlan (1-2), C Comerford (0-2), S Maher (0-2), D Dooley (0-1); R Mullaney (0-1), I Shanahan (0-1), L O'Connell (0-1), A Corby (0-1), P Purcell (0-1).	Páirc Tailteann; Referee: N Malone (Clare)

==== Division 2A Round 5 ====
16 March 2024; Round	Kildare	1-16 - 0-15	Carlow	Hawkfield COE
16 March 2024; Round	J Sheridan 1-2 (2 frees), D Qualter 0-3 (3 frees), M Curtin 0-2, D Flaherty 0-2, S Leacy 0-1, P McKenna 0-1; J Higgins 0-1, C McCabe 0-1, J Burke 0-1, C Boran 0-1; D Guerin 0-1.	Report	M Kavanagh 0-9 (8 frees), K McDonald 0-2 (2 frees), C Nolan 0-2, J Doyle 0-1, E Kealy 0-1.	Hawkfield COE

16 March 2024; Round 5	Laois	4-20 - 1-19	Kerry	Laois Hire O'Moore Park
16 March 2024; Round 5	R King 1-7 (0-3 frees), T Keyes 2-3, J Duggan 1-1, W Dunphy 0-2, R Mullaney, P Delaney, FC Fennell, I Shanahan, A Corby, J Lennon and S Bergin 0-1 each.	Report	D Goggin 0-7, M O'Connor 0-6 (frees), F Mackessy 1-1 (1-0 free), M Leane 0-2, K O'Connor, E Murphy and G Dooley 0-1 each.	Laois Hire O'Moore Park

16 March 2024; Round 5	Down	3-19 - 1-16	Meath	McKenna Park
16 March 2024; Round 5	D Sands 3-3; P Og McCrickard 0-8; T Prenter 0-3; P Sheehan 0-1; E Sands 0-1; M Conlon 0-1; D Toner 0-1; T McGrattan 0-1.	Report	J Toher 0-6 one free; J Walsh 1-0; P O'Hanrahan 0-4 three frees; L Gleeson 0-2; N Potterton 0-1; M Horan 0-1; D Rogers 0-1; T Shine 0-1.	McKenna Park

=== Division 2A Semi-Final ===
23 March 2024; Semi-final	Laois	1-24 - 0-13	Down	Laois Hire O'Moore Park; Referee: C Flynn (Westmeath)
23 March 2024; Semi-final	A Dunphy 0-7 (three frees), T Keyes 0-4, J Quinlan 0-4, R King 0-3, P Purcell 1-1, M Phelan 0-2, A Corby, FC Fennell and D Dooley 0-1 each.	Report	P Og McCrickard 0-7 (six frees), T Prenter 0-3 (one free), C Taggart (free), D Sands and B Trainor 0-1 each.	Laois Hire O'Moore Park; Referee: C Flynn (Westmeath)

=== Division 2A Final ===
31 March 2024; 15:00; Final	Carlow	1-12 - 2-22	Laois	Netwatch Cullen Park; Referee: T Gleeson (Dublin)
31 March 2024; 15:00; Final	M Kavanagh 1-5 (4fs), C Nolan 0-3, J Kavanagh, F Fitzpatrick, J Doyle, C Kehoe 0-1 each.	Report	A Dunphy 0-8 (3fs), T Keyes 1-4 (sl f), J Quinlan 1-1, D Dooley, FC Fennell, J Lennon 0-2 each, M Phelan, P Purcell, E Rowland (f) 0-1 each.	Netwatch Cullen Park; Referee: T Gleeson (Dublin)

=== Division 2A scoring statistics ===
Overall

Rank	Player	Club	Tally	Total	Matches	Average
1	Marty Kavanagh	Carlow	4-46	58	6	9.66
2	Pearse Óg McCrickard	Down	0-46	46	6	7.66
3	Jack Sheridan	Kildare	3-34	43	4	10.75
4	Pádraig O'Hanrahan	Meath	1-33	36	5	7.20
5	Aaron Dunphy	Laois	1-30	33	6	5.50
6	Daithí Sands	Down	6-09	27	6	4.50
6	Chris Nolan	Carlow	1-24	27	6	4.50
8	Tomás Keyes	Laois	4-13	25	6	4.16
9	Maurice O'Connor	Kerry	1-21	24	5	4.80
10	Stephen Maher	Laois	0-23	23	4	5.75

In a single game

Rank	Player	Team	Tally	Total	Opposition
1	Jack Sheridan	Kildare	1-13	16	Laois
2	Jack Sheridan	Kildare	1-12	15	Down
3	Aaron Dunphy	Laois	1-10	13	Meath
4	Daithí Sands	Down	3-03	12	Meath
4	Marty Kavanagh	Carlow	1-09	12	Laois
4	Shane Conway	Kerry	1-09	12	Meath
7	Ross King	Laois	1-07	10	Kerry
7	Maurice O'Connor	Kerry	1-07	10	Kildare
7	Marty Kavanagh	Carlow	1-07	10	Down
7	Marty Kavanagh	Carlow	0-10	10	Laois
7	Pearse Óg McCrickard	Down	0-10	10	Kildare

== Division 2B ==
=== Division 2B Table ===
Division Final, no promotion Division Semi-Final, no promotion Relegated to Division 3

Team	Pld	W	D	L	F	A	Diff	Pts
Derry	5	4	1	0	138	88	50	9
Donegal	5	3	1	1	124	95	29	7
Tyrone	5	2	1	2	99	98	1	5
London	5	2	0	3	115	121	-6	4
Roscommon	5	1	1	3	84	118	-34	3
Wicklow	5	0	2	3	96	136	-40	2

=== Division 2B Rounds 1 to 5 ===
==== Division 2B Round 1 ====
4 February 2024; Round 1	Roscommon	0-24 - 1-15	London	Athleague Grpunds
4 February 2024; Round 1	P Fallon 0-10, MJ Egan 0-4, S Canning 0-3, R Fallon 0-2, Conor Mulry 0-2, A Donnelly 0-1, D Leonard 0-1, C Murray 0-1.		J Goulding 0-8, S Glynn 1-4, N Broderick 0-2, S O'Meara 0-1.	Athleague Grpunds

4 February 2024; Round 1	Wicklow	0-13 - 2-23	Donegal	Echelon Park
4 February 2024; Round 1	L Evans 0-7,3f; B Ryan 0-2; G Hughes 0-2; R Óg hUisce 0-1; T Mulconry 0-1.	Report	G Gilmore 1-9,9f; L White 1-2,1pen; L McKinney 0-5; C Gartland 0-2; S McVeigh 0-1; J O’Loughlin 0-2; C Finn 0-1; J McGee Cronolly 0-1.	Echelon Park

4 February 2024; Round	Derry	2-20 - 0-16	Tyrone	Celtic Park
4 February 2024; Round	C O’Reilly (1-4), C O’Doherty (0-7, 6f), R O Mianain (0-4), J Mullan (0-2), R Mullan (0-1), M McGrath (0-1), C McNaughton (0-1).	Report	A Kelly (0-5, 4f), M Little (0-4), T Morgan (0-3, 1f), B Gormley (0-1), L Devlin (0-1), F Devlin (0-1), R Weir (0-1).	Celtic Park

==== Division 2B Round 2 ====
10 February 2024; Round 2	Donegal	0-19 - 2-20	Derry	O'Donnell Park
10 February 2024; Round 2	G Gilmore 0-9,6f; S Gillespie 0-1; L McKinney 0-3; C Gartland 0-1; J McGee Cronolly 0-2; S Ward 0-1; C Finn 0-1; L White 0-1,1f.	Report	P Cleary 0-1; D Mooney 1-2; R Ó Mianáin 0-2; C Murray 1-3; J Mullan 0-1; C O’Doherty 0-5,3f; C O’Reilly 0-2; C O’Kane 0-1; P Neilis 0-1; D McGilligan 0-2.	O'Donnell Park

11 February 2024; Round 2	London	3-30 - 1-21	Wicklow	McGovern Park
11 February 2024; Round 2	J Goulding 3-11, S Glynn 0-5, N Broderick 0-4, E McHugh 0-3, S O'Meara 0-2, S McGrath 0-2, R Murphy 0-2, E Kelly 0-1.		L Evans 0-12, G Hughes 1-0, I Clancy 0-3, D Maloney 0-3, C Moorehouse 0-1, C Lohan 0-1, B Ryan 0-1.	McGovern Park

11 February 2024; Round 2	Tyrone	0-20 - 0-11	Roscommon	Páirc Colmcille
11 February 2024; Round 2	A Kelly 0-10, T Morgan 0-3, R Weir 0-3, J McToal 0-2, M Little 0-1, J McCann 0-1.	Report	MJ Egan 0-6, P Mallon 0-3, J Donnelly 0-1, D Finn 0-1.	Páirc Colmcille

==== Division 2B Round 3 ====
24 February 2024; Round 3	Tyrone	1-17 - 0-20	Donegal	O'Neill's Healy Park
24 February 2024; Round 3	A Kelly 0-9,2 '65, 7f; S Sweeney 1-0; J McToal 0-3; L Devlin 0-2; B Gormley, R Weir, O Kee 0-1.	Report	G Gilmore 0-10, 9f; O Grant 0-2; S McVeigh, B MacIntyre, G Browne, L McKinney, C Gartland, G Browne, C O’ Grady, S Gillespie 0-1 each.	O'Neill's Healy Park

25 February 2024; Round 3	Derry	1-27 - 2-15	London	Celtic Park
25 February 2024; Round 3	C Murray (1-4), C O'Doherty (0-6, 5f), J Mullan (0-3), P Cleary (0-3), R O Mianain (0-3), J Friel (0-2), C O'Reilly (0-2), C O'Kane (0-1), D Mooney (0-1), M McGrath (0-1), D Magilligan (0-1).	Report	J Goulding (1-13, 5f), E McHugh (1-1), N Gheoeghan (0-1).	Celtic Park

25 February 2024; Round 3	Wicklow	1-15 - 2-12	Roscommon	Echelon Park
25 February 2024; Round 3	S Germaine 0-8, G Hughes 1-1, D Redmond 0-1, I Clancy 0-1, L Evans 0-1, D Maloney 0-1.		R Fallon 2-6, S Canning 0-2, C Mulry 0-1, D Finn 0-1, C Murray 0-1.	Echelon Park

==== Division 2B Round 4 ====
10 March 2024; Round 4	London	0-18 - 0-11	Tyrone	McGovern Park
10 March 2024; Round 4	J Goulding 0-11 (0-7f); S Glynn 0-3; A Cunney, R Murphy, M Flannery & T Kennedy 0-1 each	Report	A Kelly 0-4 (0-2f); L Devlin 0-2; B Gormley, J McCann, J McToal, S Óg Grogan & R Weir 0-1 each	McGovern Park

10 March 2024; Round 4	Rosocmmon	1-14 - 0-24	Donegal	Dr Hyde Park
10 March 2024; Round 4	B Mulry 1-3; P Fallon 0-4 (0-3f); A Donnelly & B Lawlor 0-2; C Mulry, J Hardiman & R Lyons (f) 0-1 each	Report	G Gilmore 0-7 (0-6f); L McKinney 0-4; O Grant 0-3; B MacIntyre & D O’Maoileidigh 0-2 each; R Campbell, L White (f), C O’Grady & J O’Loughlin 0-1	Dr Hyde Park

10 March 2024; Round 4	Wicklow	0-18 - 0-18	Derry	Echelon Park
10 March 2024; Round 4	S Germaine 0-9, L Evans 0-2, R McMahon 0-2, W Kavanagh 0-2, B Ryan 0-1, D Maloney 0-1, G Hughes 0-1.		C McNaughton 0-6, J Mullan 0-4, P Cleary 0-3, C O'Doherty 0-2, D Mooney 0-1, D McGilligan 0-1, P Neillis 0-1.	Echelon Park

==== Division 2B Round 5 ====
17 March 2024; Round 5	Derry	2-32 - 0-14	Roscommon	Lavey Grounds
17 March 2024; Round 5	T Fleming (1-0, 1og), D McGilligan (1-4), R O Mianain (0-7), C O'Doherty (0-6, 1f), C O'Reilly (0-5), C Murray (0-3), C McNaughton (0-2), D Cartin (0-2), S Kelly (0-1), J Mullan (0-1), P Cleary (0-1),	Report	J Hardiman (0-4, 1f), C Murray (0-3), P Fallon (0-4, 3, 1 '65'), D Mullen (0-2), A Donnelly (0-1)	Lavey Grounds

17 March 2024; Round 5	Donegal	2-26 - 1-16	London	O'Donnell Park
17 March 2024; Round 5	G Gilmore 0-13, 4f; L McKinney 1-4; O Grant 1-0; C Gartland and D O Maoileidigh 0-2 each; S Gillespie, J Cronnolly McGee, R Campbell, B Óg MacIntyre and J O'Loughlin 0-1 each.	Report	B Dowling 0-8, 7f; S O’Meara 1-1; O Shiel and R Lodge 0-3 each; E McGrath 0-1.	O'Donnell Park

17 March 2024; Round 5	Tyrone	1-29 - 2-17	Wicklow	Dungannon Grounds
17 March 2024; Round 5	L Devlin 1-00, A Kelly 0-18 (12f, 3 ’65), J McToal 0-04, B Gormley, S Sweeney 0-02 each, F Devlin, T Morgan, T Mullin 0-01 each.	Report	S Germaine 1-01, C Lohan 1-00, L Evand 0-08 (6f), G Hughes 0-03, D Maloney, W Kavanagh 0-02 each, I Clancy 0-01.	Dungannon Grounds

=== Division 2B Semi-Final ===
23 March 2024	Donegal	3-14 - 5-09	Tyrone	O'Donnell Park; Referee: P Owens (Down)
23 March 2024	P Kelly 2-2; S McVeigh 1-1; L McKinney, 0-4 (2f); O Marley, B Óg McIntyre 0-2 each; C Garland, C O’Grady and J O’Loughlin 0-1 each.	Report	L Devlin, S Óg Grogan, and C Munroe 1-1 each; J McToal, and T Morgan 1-0 each; A Kelly 0-2 (1f); B Gormley, F Devlin, T Millin and R Weir 0-1 each.	O'Donnell Park; Referee: P Owens (Down)

=== Division 2B Final ===
31 March 2024; 17:00 BST (UTC+1)	Derry	1-14 - 1-08	Tyrone	Owenbeg COE; Referee: J Connors
31 March 2024; 17:00 BST (UTC+1)	C O’Doherty 0-7 (7fs), S Kelly 1-1, R Ó Mianáin 0-2 (1f), D McGilligan 0-1, C Murray 0-1, C McNaughton 0-1, C O’Reilly 0-1.	Report	A Kelly 0-6 (6fs), R Weir 1-0, L Devlin 0-1, J McCann 0-1.	Owenbeg COE; Referee: J Connors

=== Division 2B scoring statistics ===
Overall

Rank	Player	Club	Tally	Total	Matches	Average
1	Aidy Kelly	Tyrone	0-54	54	7	7.71
2	Gerard Gilmore	Donegal	1-48	51	5	10.20
3	Jack Goulding	London	4-35	47	4	11.75
4	Cormac O'Doherty	Derry	0-33	33	6	5.50
5	Luke Evans	Wicklow	0-30	30	5	6.00

In a single game

Rank	Player	Team	Tally	Total	Opposition
1	Jack Goulding	London	3-11	20	Wicklow
2	Aidy Kelly	Tyrone	0-18	18	Wicklow
3	Jack Goulding	London	1-13	16	Derry
4	Gerard Gilmore	Donegal	0-13	13	London
5	Robbie Fallon	Rosocmmon	2-06	12	Wicklow
5	Gerard Gilmore	Donegal	1-09	12	Wicklow
5	Luke Evans	Wicklow	0-12	12	London
8	Jack Goulding	London	0-11	11	Tyrone
9	Aidy Kelly	Tyrone	0-10	10	Roscommon
9	Paddy Fallon	Roscommon	0-10	10	London
9	Gerard Gilmore	Donegal	0-10	10	Tyrone

== Division 3A ==
=== Division 3A Table ===
Division final, no promotion Division semi-final, no promotion Relegation to Division 4

Team	Pld	W	D	L	F	A	Diff	Pts
Mayo	5	5	0	0	125	65	60	10
Sligo	5	3	1	1	126	112	14	7
Cavan	5	3	0	2	109	105	4	6
Armagh	5	1	1	3	86	97	-11	3
Louth	5	1	0	4	103	132	-29	2
Monaghan	5	1	0	4	91	129	-38	2

=== Division 3A Rounds 1 to 5 ===
==== Division 3A Round 1 ====
3 February 2024; Round 1	Sligo	4-19 - 3-18	Cavan	Markievicz Park
3 February 2024; Round 1	G O'Kelly-Lynch 1-6, T O'Kelly-Lynch 2-2, C Griffin 1-1, M Munnelly 0-3, T Cawley 0-2, J McHugh 0-1, R McHugh 0-1, N Feehily 0-1, L O'Kelly-Lynch 0-1, F Connolly 0-1.		L O'Brien 1-8, N Kenny 1-2, T Leonard 1-1, C Maher 0-5, R Delaney 0-1, L Óg Cooke 0-1.	Markievicz Park

4 February 2024; Round 1	Mayo	1-18 - 2-07	Armagh	Hastings Insurance MacHale Park
4 February 2024; Round 1	A Phillips 1-2, C Phillips 0-5, L Lavin 0-4, S Kenny 0-2, J Heraty 0-2, D Huane 0-1, E Delaney 0-1, O Greally 0-1.		A O'Boyle 1-5, N Lennon 1-0, F Donnelly 0-1, C Reneghan 0-1.	Hastings Insurance MacHale Park

4 February 2024; Round 3	Louth	4-14 - 1-20	Monaghan	Páirc Naomh Bríd
4 February 2024; Round 3	J Casey 2-4, D Geoghegan 1-5, C Murphy 1-1, P Lynch 0-2, D Casey 0-1, T McCreesh 0-1.		N Arthur 0-13, T Hughes 1-2, B Minogue 0-1, R McMahon 0-1, H Byrne 0-1, L Moloney 0-1, C Gernon 0-1.	Páirc Naomh Bríd

==== Division 3A Round 2 ====
10 February 2024; Round 2	Cavan	3-19 - 1-19	Louth	Kingspan Breffni Park
10 February 2024; Round 2	L O'Brien 1-10, M Hynes 1-1, N Kenny 0-4, R Delaney 1-0, T Leonard 0-2, J McGuinness 0-1, C Maher 0-1.		D Geoghegan 1-9, P Lynch 0-4, D Stephenson 0-2, C Murphy 0-2, J Costello 0-1, J Casey 0-1.	Kingspan Breffni Park

11 February 2024; Round 2	Monaghan	0-09 - 5-20	Mayo	St Mary's Park
11 February 2024; Round 2	N Arthur 0-5, C Gernon 0-2, T Hughes 0-2.		A Phillips 3-3, C Phillips 1-6, E Delaney 1-2, L Lavin 0-3, D Huane 0-2, M Farrell 0-2, S Crinnigan 0-1, S Kenny 0-1.	St Mary's Park

11 February 2024; Round 3	Armagh	1-15 - 2-12	Sligo	St Oliver Plunkett Park
11 February 2024; Round 3	A O'Boyle 1-9, P Gaffney 0-3, F Donnelly 0-2, S Óg McGuinness 0-1.		T O'Kelly-Lynch 0-7, C Hanniffy 2-0, T Cawley 0-3, N Kilcullen 0-1, M Munnelly 0-1.	St Oliver Plunkett Park

==== Division 3A Round 3 ====
25 February 2024; Round 3	Louth	3-17 - 5-19	Sligo	Páirc Naomh Bríd
25 February 2024; Round 3	D Geoghegan 0-14, C Murphy 2-1, G Allen 1-0, J Costello 0-1, C Quigley 0-1.		G O'Kelly-Lynch 2-12, T Cawley 1-2, C Hanniffy 1-1, R McHugh 1-0, M Munnelly 0-2, E O'Donoghue 0-2	Páirc Naomh Bríd

25 February 2024; Round 3	Monaghan	0-23 - 0-20	Armagh	St Tiernach's Park
25 February 2024; Round 3	T Hughes 0-7, N Garland 0-2, P Malone 0-2, L Moloney 0-8 (8f), C Gernon 0-1, O Kiernan 0-2, M Murphy 0-1.		A O’Boyle 0-14 (13f), S Watters 0-1, S Og McGuinness 0-1, P McBride 0-1, N Lennon 0-1, S Harvey 0-1.	St Tiernach's Park

25 February 2024; Round 3	Mayo	2-17 - 1-13	Cavan	Hastings Insurance MacHale Park
25 February 2024; Round 3	L Lavin 1-3, A Phillips 0-6, M Farrell 1-0, C Phillips 0-3, D Huane 0-3, S Kenny 0-1, E Delaney 0-1.		N Kenny 1-6, L O'Brien 0-4, J McGuinne 0-1, C Maher 0-1, D Carney 0-1.	Hastings Insurance MacHale Park

==== Division 3A Round 4 ====
9 March 2024; Round 4	Cavan	2-13 - 0-16	Armagh	Kingspan Breffni Park
9 March 2024; Round 4	L O'Brien (0-5, 3f), J Barry (1-1), B Fitzgerald (1-0), N Kenny (0-3, 1f), T Leonard (0-2); C Maher (0-1); S Keating (0-1).		A O'Boyle (0-11, 8f), F Donnelly (0-1), K McKernan (0-1); A Fox (0-1), S Óg McGuinness (0-1); S Harvey (0-1).	Kingspan Breffni Park

10 March 2024; Round 4	Sligo	2-23 - 1-20	Monaghan	Markievicz Park
10 March 2024; Round 4	G O'Kelly-Lynch 0-7, T Cawley 1-2, E O'Donoghue 1-0, C Hannify 0-3, M Munnelly 0-2, D O'Brien 0-2, F Moylan 0-2, J McHugh 0-1, L O'Kelly-Lynch 0-1, F Cawley 0-1, D Hanley 0-1, K O'Kennedy 0-1.		L Moloney 1-12, C Gernon 0-3, N Garland 0-2, P Malone 0-1, A Kenny 0-1, P McGahon 0-1.	Markievicz Park

10 March 2024; Round 4	Mayo	0-28 - 0-13	Louth	Connacht COE
10 March 2024; Round 4	C Phillips 0-11, L Lavin 0-6, E Collins 0-3, M Farrell 0-2, S Boland 0-1, C Hession 0-1, O Greally 0-1, S Kenny 0-1, A Phillips 0-1, E Delaney 0-1.		D Geoghegan 0-9, J Casey 0-1, T McCreesh 0-1, P Lynch 0-1, G Allen 0-1.	Connacht COE

==== Division 3A Round 5 ====
16 March 2024; Round 5	Armagh	0-19 - 2-10	Louth	P. J. O'Neill Park
16 March 2024; Round 5	A O’Boyle 0-11 (9f), S Renaghan 0-2, C Renaghan 0-2; B Shortt 0-1, P Gaffney 0-1, S Óg McGuinness 0-1, A Fox 0-1.		D Geoghegan 0-8 (7f), C Murphy 1-2; P Lynch 1-0.	P. J. O'Neill Park

16 March 2024; Round 5	Cavan	2-13 - 0-13	Monaghan	Kingspan Breffni Park
16 March 2024; Round 5	N Kenny (0-7, 5f): B Fitzgerald (1-0); R Delaney (1-0); S Keating (0-2, 1f); L O'Brien (0-1); E Shalvey (0-1); T Leonard (0-1); L Óg Cooke (0-1).	Report	N Arthur (0-8, 4f); T Hughes (0-2); D Hughes (0-1); O Kiernan (0-1); E Walsh (0-1).	Kingspan Breffni Park

16 March 2024; Round 5	Sligo	0-14 - 2-12	Mayo	Kent Park
16 March 2024; Round 5	G O’Kelly Lynch 0-4 (3f), F Connolly, F Cawley and J McHugh 0-2 each, M Munnelly, R McHugh, T Cawley and K O’Kennedy 0-1 each.	Report	E Delaney 1-1, J Burke 1-0, L Lavin and C Phillips (2f) 0-3 each, S Boland 0-2f, C Hession, D Kenny and B Douglas (f) 0-1 each.	Kent Park

=== Division 3A Semi-final ===
23 March 2024; Semi-final	Sligo	0-22 - 1-14	Cavan	Markievicz Park
23 March 2024; Semi-final	G O’Kelly-Lynch 0-12 (11f); T Cawley, F Cawley 0-3 each; J McHugh 0-2; R McHugh, T O’Kelly-Lynch 0-1 each.	Report	N Kenny 0-11 (9f); T Leonard 1-1; J Barry 0-2.	Markievicz Park

=== Division 3A Final ===
31 March 2024; 14:00 IST (UTC+1); Final	Mayo	3-19 - 3-16	Sligo	MacHale Park; Referee: N Malone (Clare)
31 March 2024; 14:00 IST (UTC+1); Final	S Boland 2-7, 4f; E Delaney 1-2; C Philips 0-5,3f,65; L Lavin 0-3; A Philips 0-2;	Report	G O’Kelly Lynch 0-8, 5f, 65; T Cawley 1-2; C Hanniffy, C Griffin 1-0 each; F Moylan, R McHugh 0-2 each; M Munnelly, F Cawley 0-1 each	MacHale Park; Referee: N Malone (Clare)

=== Division 3A scoring statistics ===
Overall

Rank	Player	Club	Tally	Total	Matches	Average
1	Gerard O'Kelly-Lynch	Sligo	3-49	58	7	8.28
2	Alex O'Boyle	Armagh	2-50	56	5	11.20
3	Darren Geoghegan	Louth	2-45	51	5	10.20
4	Nicholas Kenny	Cavan	2-33	39	6	6.50
5	Cormac Phillips	Mayo	1-33	36	6	6.00

In a single game

Rank	Player	Team	Tally	Total	Opposition
1	Gerard O'Kelly-Lynch	Sligo	2-12	18	Louth
2	Leo Moloney	Monaghan	1-12	15	Sligo
3	Darren Geoghegan	Louth	0-14	14	Sligo
3	Alex O'Boyle	Armagh	0-14	14	Monaghan
5	Shane Boland	Mayo	2-07	13	Sligo
5	Liam O'Brien	Cavan	1-10	13	Louth
5	Niall Arthur	Monaghan	0-13	13	Louth
8	Adrain Phillips	Mayo	3-03	12	Monaghan
8	Darren Geoghegan	Louth	1-09	12	Cavan
8	Alex O'Boyle	Armagh	1-09	12	Sligo
8	Gerard O'Kelly-Lynch	Sligo	0-12	12	Cavan

== Division 3B ==
=== Division 3B Table ===
Division Final Division Semi-final

All teams are placed in Division 4 for 2025

Team	Pld	W	D	L	F	A	Diff	Pts
Fermanagh	4	4	0	0	78	37	41	8
Longford	4	2	1	1	67	51	16	5
Warwickshire	4	1	1	2	81	95	-14	3
Leitrim	4	1	1	2	62	87	-25	3
Lancashire	4	0	1	3	66	84	-18	1

=== Division 3B Rounds 1 to 5 ===
==== Division 3B Round 1 ====
3 February 2024; Round 1	Lancashire	0-12 - 1-09	Longford	Abbottstown COE
3 February 2024; Round 1	E Clifford 0-4, C Kenny 0-2, F Henry 0-2, D Lynch 0-1, E Costello 0-1, S Nugent 0-1, D Furlong 0-1.		R Murray 1-4, D Buckley 0-2, J Casey 0-1, M Mulcahy 0-1, M O'Donoghue 0-1.	Abbottstown COE

3 February 2024; Round 1	Warwickshire	1-17 - 0-20	Leitrim	Páirc na hÉireann
3 February 2024; Round 1	J Grealish (0-8, 2f, 1’65), D Devine (0-5, 3f); D Lowry (1-0), B Fallon (0-1), J Collins (0-1), D Griffin (0-1); N Shalvey (0-1).	Report	J Murray (0-10, 8f), C Beirne (0-3), S O’Riordan (0-2), G O’Hagan (0-1), M O’Brien (0-1); S Keane (0-1); C Hackett (0-1), M Feeney (0-1).	Páirc na hÉireann

==== Division 3B Round 2 ====
10 February 2024; Round 2	Longford	2-21 - 1-15	Warwickshire	Glennon Brothers Pearse Park
10 February 2024; Round 2	M Mulcahy 2-2, P Lynam 0-8, M O'Donoghue 0-3, D Buckley 0-2, C Mullane 0-2, C Flynn 0-1, S Lancaster 0-1, R Murray 0-1, S Gregg 0-1.		J Grealish 1-11, A Hands 0-1, L Hands 0-1, K McGee 0-1, C McKeigue 0-1.	Glennon Brothers Pearse Park

10 February 2024; Round 2	Leitrim	1-05 - 1-26	Fermanagh	Seán O'Heslin Memorial Park
10 February 2024; Round 2	D Keane 1-0, C Cunniffe 0-2, C Hackett 0-2, C Beirne 0-1.		J Duffy 0-7, L McCuskar 0-6, J Tormey 1-1, D McKeogh 0-4, T Duane 0-3, B Teehan 0-3, B Corrigan 0-1, T Keenan 0-1.	Seán O'Heslin Memorial Park

==== Division 3B Round 3 ====
24 February 2024; Round 3	Leitrim	2-18 - 0-17	Lancashire	Avant Money Páirc Seán Mac Diarmada
24 February 2024; Round 3	J Murray 0-8, C Hackett 0-4, C Beirne 1-0, D Keane 1-0, S Markham 0-2, E Cox 0-2, G O'Hagan 0-1, S O'Riordan 0-1.		D Lynch 0-8, E Clifford 0-3, C Convery 0-3, E Costello 0-1, F Henry 0-1, P Boylan 0-1.	Avant Money Páirc Seán Mac Diarmada

24 February 2024; Round 3	Fermanagh	1-19 - 2-05	Warwickshire	Brewster Park
24 February 2024; Round 3	T Keenan 1-2, J Duffy 0-4, L McCuskar 0-3, T Duane 0-2, S Corrigan 0-2, J Tormey 0-2, C McManus 0-1, R Bogue 0-1, D Teague 0-1, C Duffy 0-1.		D Devine 1-2, K Magee 1-0, J Grealish 0-3.	Brewster Park

==== Division 3B Round 4 ====
9 March 2024; Round 4	Fermanagh	1-13 - 1-08	Lancashire	Brewster Park
9 March 2024; Round 4	B Teehan 1-2, L McCuskar 0-3, T Duane 0-2, J Duffy 0-2, JP McGarry 0-1, T Keenan 0-1, B Corrigan 0-1, C Duffy 0-1.		A McKinley 1-0, D Lynch 0-3, E Clifford 0-2, J Patton 0-2, P Boylan 0-1.	Brewster Park

9 March 2024; Round 4	Longford	2-15 - 1-07	Leitrim	Glennon Brothers Pearse Park
9 March 2024; Round 4	C Mullane 2-2, R Murray 0-6, P Lynam 0-5, S Lancaster 0-1, D Buckley 0-1.		J Murray 1-3, G O'Hagan 0-2, M Feeney 0-1, C Beirne 0-1.	Glennon Brothers Pearse Park

==== Division 3B Round 5 ====
16 March 2024; Round 4	Fermanagh	0-11 - 0-07	Longford	Brewster Park
16 March 2024; Round 4	L McCuskar 0-4, B Teehan 0-3, D Teague 0-2, T Duane 0-1, J Duffy 0-1.		R Murray 0-5, C Mullane 0-1, P Lynam 0-1.	Brewster Park

16 March 2024; Round 4	Warwickshire	3-23 - 3-17	Lancashire	Páirc na hÉireann
16 March 2024; Round 4	D Devine 1-7, L Hands 2-0, J Grealish 0-5, K McKernan 0-3, R Duggan 0-3, I Dwyer 0-2, P Hands 0-1, D Devine 0-1, K Magee 0-1.		C Kennedy 1-2, D Lynch 0-5, F Henry 1-1, E Costello 1-0, S Nugent 0-2, P Boylan 0-1, C Levingstone 0-1, S Parsons 0-1, E Kelly 0-1, B Donnellan 0-1, A Gallagher 0-1.	Páirc na hÉireann

=== Division 3B Semi-final ===
23 March 2024; Semi-final	Longford	1-12 - 1-16	Warwickshire	Glennon Brothers Pearse Park; Referee: K Brady
23 March 2024; Semi-final	R Murray (0-7, 6 frees), M Mulcahy (1-0), C Mullane (0-2), S Lancaster (0-1); D Crossan (0-1); D Caslin (0-1).	Report	K McKernan (0-7, 1 free), D Devine (0-4, 2 frees); L Hands (1-0), J Grealish (0-3, 2 frees), K McGee (0-1), A Hanley (0-1).	Glennon Brothers Pearse Park; Referee: K Brady

=== Division 3B Final ===
31 March 2024; 14:00 BST (UTC+1); Final	Fermanagh	1-13 - 1-18	Warwickshire	Brewster Park; Referee: C Daly (Kildare)
31 March 2024; 14:00 BST (UTC+1); Final	L McCusker 0-5 (3 frees), D McKeogh 1-1 (1 free), B Teehan 0-1, S Corrigan 0-1, D Teague 0-2 (1 65’, 1 free), T Keenan 0-1, C Duffy 0-1, J Tormey 0-1	Report	D Devine 0-7 (5 frees), K McKernan 0-4 (1 SL, 1 free), L Hands 1-1, E Brannigan 0-2, J Grealish 0-2, D Lowry 0-1, I Dwyer 0-1	Brewster Park; Referee: C Daly (Kildare)

=== Division 3B scoring statistics ===
Overall

Rank	Player	Club	Tally	Total	Matches	Average
1	Jack Grealish	Warwickshire	1-32	35	6	5.83
2	David Devine	Warwickshire	2-26	32	6	5.33
3	Reuben Murray	Longford	1-23	26	5	5.20
4	Joe Murray	Leitrim	1-21	24	4	6.00
5	Luca McCuskar	Fermanagh	0-21	21	5	4.20

In a single game

Rank	Player	Team	Tally	Total	Opposition
1	Jack Grealish	Warwickshire	1-11	14	Longford
2	David Devine	Warwickshire	1-08	11	Lancashire
3	Joe Murray	Leitrim	0-10	10	Warwickshire
4	Michael Mulcahy	Longford	2-02	8	Warwickshire
4	Cathal Mullane	Longford	2-02	8	Leitrim
4	Paddy Lynam	Longford	0-08	8	Warwickshire
4	Jack Grealish	Warwickshire	0-08	8	Leitrim
4	Joe Murray	Leitrim	0-08	8	Lancashire
4	David Lynch	Lancashire	0-08	8	Leitrim
10	Reuben Murray	Longford	1-04	7	Lancashire
10	John Duffy	Fermanagh	0-07	7	Leitrim
10	Reuben Murray	Longford	0-07	7	Warwickshire
10	Kevin McKernan	Warwickshire	0-07	7	Longford
10	David Devine	Warwickshire	0-07	7	Fermanagh
