= 2025 Offaly Senior Hurling Championship =

Annual hurling competition season

- Dates: 11 July – 19 October 2025
- Teams: 10
- Sponsor: Molloy Environmental Systems
- Champions: Kilcormac–Killoughey (7th title); Conor Slevin (captain); Declan Laffen (manager)
- Runners-up: Shinrone; Killian Sampson (captain); Mark Morkan (manager)
- Relegated: Seir Kieran

Tournament statistics
- Matches played: 26
- Goals scored: 62 (2.38 per match)
- Points scored: 974 (37.46 per match)
- Top scorer(s): Adam Screeney (1-51)

The 2025 Offaly Senior Hurling Championship was the 128th staging of the Offaly Senior Hurling Championship since its establishment by the Offaly County Board in 1896. The draw for the group stage placings was made on 13 February 2025. The championship ran from 11 July to 19 October 2025.

Kilcormac–Killoughey entered the championship as the defending champions. Tullamore were due to be relegated, however, they earned a reprieve after Kilcormac–Killoughey decided not to field their second team, in spite of earning their right to promotion after winning the 2024 Offaly SBHC.

The final was played on 19 October 2025 at Glenisk O'Connor Park in Tullamore, between Kilcormac–Killoughey and Shinrone, in what was their third meeting in the final in four years. Kilcormac–Killoughey won the match by 1–24 to 2–14 to claim their seventh championship title overall and a third title in succession.

Kilcormac–Killoughey's Adam Screeney was the championship's top scorer with 1–51.

== Participating teams ==
Team	Location	Manager(s)	Captain
Ballinamere	Ballykilmurry	Niall Rigney; Michael Duignan	Ciarán Burke
Belmont	Ferbane	Paul Murphy	Ciarán Cahill
Birr	Birr	Barry Whelahan	Morgan Watkins
Coolderry	Coolderry	Brian Carroll	Eoghan Parlon
Kilcormac–Killoughey	Kilcormac	Declan Laffen	Conor Slevin
Kinnitty	Kinnitty	Michael Bergin	
Seir Kieran	Clareen	Enda Mulhare	
Shinrone	Shinrone	Mark Morkan	Killian Sampson
St Rynagh's	Banagher	Arien Delaney	
Tullamore	Tullamore	Shane Hand	

== Group 1 ==
=== Group 1 table ===
Semi-finalists Quarter-finalists Relegation playoff

Team	Matches				Score			Pts
Team	Pld	W	D	L	For	Against	Diff	Pts
Birr	4	3	1	0	103	80	23	7
Coolderry	4	3	0	1	90	82	8	6
Ballinamere	4	2	0	2	97	91	6	4
Tullamore	4	1	1	2	96	91	-5	3
Seir Kieran	4	0	0	4	69	101	-32	0

=== Group 1 results ===
11 July 2025 Round 1	Seir Kieran	0-16 - 0-31	Birr	Páirc Naoimh Ciaráin
	L Carey 0-7 (6f), K Dunne 0-4, D Guinan 0-2, M Gilligan, E Murphy, A Hynes 0-1 each.	Report	E Cahill 0-14 (4f), L Nolan and L Quinn 0-3 each, S Thompson (2f), C Kenny, B Miller and B Harding 0-2 each, S Ryan, B Murphy, A Watkins 0-1 each.

12 July 2025 Round 1	Ballinamere	2-14 - 2-22	Coolderry	Ballinamere Grounds
	B Duignan (6frees, 1 65) 0-7, D Bourke 1-3, A Maher 1-2, D Wyer and S Doran 0-1 each.	Report	E Burke (9frees) 0-11, D Miller 2-2, S Ryan and K Connolly 0-2 each, E Ryan, E Parlon, G McCormack, S Connolly and A Connolly 0-1 each.

24 July 2025 Round 2	Tullamore	2-18 - 4-18	Ballinamere	O'Brien Park
	S Dooley 1-8 (7f), J Houlihan 1-5, C Egan 0-2, C Bourke, M Fox and M Keogh 0-1 each.	Report	A Maher 2-2, B Duignan 0-7 (5f), M O'Brien 2-0, S Bourke, D Bourke, J Maher and J Scully 0-2 each, S Doran 0-1.

26 July 2025 Round 2	Coolderry	2-20 - 2-14	Seir Kieran	Coolderry Grounds
	E Burke (0-7, 0-3 frees), S Corcoran (0-4, frees), G McCormack (0-3), E Parlon, S Connolly (1-0 each), C Burke (0-2), S Connolly, K Connolly, A Connolly, E Ryan (0-1 each).	Report	L Carey (1-10, 1-0 penalty, 0-8 frees), A Hynes (1-1), T Dooley (free), D Guinan, E Murphy (0-1 each).

8 August 2025 Round 3	Birr	2-18 - 1-14	Coolderry	Shinrone Grounds
	E Cahill 1-9 (6f and one sideline), L Quinn 1-2, M Watkins and L Nolan 0-2 each, S Ryan, A Watkins, B Miller 0-1 each.	Report	E Burke 0-7 (5f and 1 '65'), S Connolly 1-0, S Corcoran (2f), K Connolly and D Miller 0-2 each, G McCormack 0-1.

8 August 2025 Round 3	Seir Kieran	1-13 - 0-18	Tullamore	Kinnitty Grounds
	L Carey 0-9 (0-3f, 0-1 65), O Guinan 0-3, K Dunne 1-0, T Dooley 0-1.	Report	S Dooley 0-10 (0-7f), C Bourke 0-3, C Egan 0-1, D Fox 0-1, M Keogh 0-1, L Egan 0-1, M Fox 0-1.

22 August 2005 Round 4	Birr	2-20 - 4-14	Tullamore	Grant Heating St Brendan's Park
	M Watkins 2-5, E Cahill 0-9 (6f), L Quinn 0-3, A Watkins, J Ryan, B Harding 0-1 each.	Report	S Dooley 1-9 (5f and 2 '65's), D Fox 1-2, M Fox 0-3, C Egan and J Sheerin 1-0 each,.

23 August 2005 Round 4	Ballinamere	1-23 - 0-17	Seir Kieran	St Rynagh's Park
	B Duignan (6frees) 1-9, D Bourke 0-5, J Maher and A Maher 0-3 each, S Bourke 0-2, D Ravenhill (1free) 0-1.	Report	L Carey (8frees) 0-9, J Bergin and T Dooley 0-2 each, A Hynes, D Mooney, D Guinan and O Guinan 0-1 each.

6 September 2025 Round 5	Birr	1-19 - 2-15	Ballinamere	Kilcormac Grounds
	E Cahill 0-10 (8f), C Mulrooney 0-4, A Watkins 0-3, M Watkins 1-0, B Harding and L Quinn 0-1 each.	Report	B Duignan 2-11 (2 '65's and 8f), D Ravenhill 0-2 (1f), J Murphy and A Maher 0-1 each.

6 September 2025 Round 5	Coolderry	1-16 - 1-15	Tullamore	Rath Grounds
	S Dooley (9frees, 2 65), 0-12, D Fox 1-0, C Bourke, M Fox and L Egan 0-1 each.	Report	E Burke (2frees) 1-5, D Miller 0-3, S Corcoran (2frees) and E Ryan 0-2 each, G McCormack, A Cleary, C Burke and S Ryan 0-1 each.

== Group 2 ==
=== Group 2 table ===
Semi-finalists Quarter-finalists Relegation playoff

Team	Matches				Score			Pts
Team	Pld	W	D	L	For	Against	Diff	Pts
Belmont	4	3	1	0	74	63	11	7
Kilcormac–Killoughey	4	2	2	0	104	68	36	6
Shinrone	4	2	1	1	91	77	14	5
St Rynagh's	4	1	0	3	81	90	-9	2
Kinnitty	4	0	0	4	62	114	-52	0

=== Group 2 results ===
12 July 2025 Round 1	Belmont	0-15 - 0-15	Kilcormac–Killoughey	Moystown Grounds
	D Nally 0-6 (5f), A Egan and D Corbett 0-3 each, J Nally, R Flynn and C Dunican 0-1 each.	Report	P Geraghty 0-5, M Murooney 0-4 (1f), C Slevin (2f) and D Hand 0-2 each, C Spain and J Gorman 0-1 each.

13 July 2025 Round 1	Shinrone	0-19 - 0-17	St Rynagh's	St Mary's Field
	DJ McLoughlin and D Morkan (3f) 0-4 each, P Cleary 0-3, E Cleary (2f), K Sampson and E Bailey-O'Brien 0-2 each, A Landy and S Cleary 0-1 each.	Report	S Quirke 0-5 (4f), A Treacy (3f) and S Rigney 0-3 each, M Maloney (1 '65') and A Kenny 0-2 each, J O'Connor and A Molloy 0-1 each.

25 July 2025 Round 2	St Rynagh's	0-14 - 0-20	Belmont	St Rynagh's Park
	A Treacy (1f) and S Quirke (3f) 0-3 each, S Rigney, A Molloy and A Kenny 0-2 each, J O'Connor and D Scully 0-1 each.	Report	D Nally 0-13 (7f and 1 '65'), A Egan 0-3, C Egan 0-2, A Nugent and C Dunican 0-1 each.

26 July 2025 Round 2	Kinnitty	3-09 - 4-21	Shinrone	Kinnitty Grounds
	J Dempsey 1-3 (goal from a penalty and 3f), D Flanagan 2-0, J Armstrong and C Hardiman 0-2 each, C Robinson and E Callaghan 0-1 each.	Report	J Sampson 1-4, S Cleary 1-2, A Landy 1-1, DJ McLoughlin, D Morkan (2 '65' and 1f) and P Cleary 0-3 each, E Bailey-O'Brien 1-0, A Cleary 0-2, E Cleary (f), C Cleary and D Cleary 0-1 each.

9 August 2025 Round 3	Belmont	1-13 - 0-14	Kinnitty	Grant Heating St Brendan's Park
	D Nally 0-6 (4f), B Carroll 1-0, D Egan (2f) and A Egan 0-2 each, J Nally, A McCabe and R McEvoy 0-1 each.	Report	J Dempsey 0-4 (4f), E Callaghan 0-4 (1 sideline), C Robinson 0-2, D Flanagan, C Hardiman, C Meaney, O Kealey 0-1 each.

9 August 2025 Round 3	Kilcormac–Killoughey	1-31 - 1-18	St Rynagh's	Grant Heating St Brendan's Park
	A Screeney 1-13 (10f and 1 '65')), J Gorman 0-7, A Kavanagh 0-4, J Screeney 0-2, C Slevin (f), M Mulrooney, B Kavanagh, P Geraghty, T Geraghty 0-1 each.	Report	S Quirke 0-5 (3f and 1 '65'), S Rigney 1-1, M Maloney, D Scully, A Kenny 0-2 each, B Conneely, A Treacy (f), C Daly, A Molloy, P Cannon, E Woods 0-1 each.

23 August 2025 Round 4	Shinrone	1-17 - 0-23	Belmont	Grant Heating St Brendan's Park
	DJ McLoughlin (0-6), E Cleary (1-1, 1-0 penalty, 0-1 free), D Morkan (0-3, frees), J Sampson, D Doughan (0-2 each), E Bailey O'Brien (0-2, 0-1 free), A Landy (0-1).	Report	D Nally (0-13, 0-6 frees, 0-1 '45'), P Clancy (0-3), O Kelly (0-2), R McEvoy, C Dunican, C Egan, A Egan, R Flynn (0-1 each).

24 August 2025 Round 4	Kilcormac–Killoughey	3-27 - 0-13	Kinnitty	Kilcormac Grounds
	A Screeney (0-9, 0-5 frees, 0-2 '65s'), C Mahon (1-2), C Mitchell (0-5), A Kavanagh (1-1), D Hand (0-4, 0-2 frees), J Gorman (1-0), C Spain (0-2), J Quinn, P Geraghty, C Slevin (free), T Geraghty (0-1 each).	Report	J Dempsey (0-5, 0-3 frees), D Flanagan, A Kealey (0-2 each), O Kealey, S Kinsella, N Corrigan (free), S Ryan (0-1 each).

7 September 2025 Round 5	St Rynagh's	1-26 - 0-17	Kinnitty	Grant Heating St Brendan's Park
	A Treacy 1-5 (one sideline), S Quirke 0-6 (6f), D Scully and L O'Connor (2f) 0-4 each, S Rigney and E Woods 0-3 each, A Molloy 0-1.	Report	J Dempsey 0-8 (8f), D Flanagan 0-4, J Hardiman 0-2 (1f), C Leonard, C Robinson, A Kealey 0-1 each.

7 September 2025 Round 5	Kilcormac–Killoughey	1-16 - 0-19	Shinrone	Grant Heating St Brendan's Park
	A Screeney 0-9 (6f), C Mitchell 1-2, C Slevin (f0, D Kilmartin, C Spain, J Gorman, P Geraghty 0-1 each.	Report	D Morkan 0-4 (3f), E Cleary (2f), A Landy, L Watkins, P Cleary, J Sampson 0-2 each, E Bailey-O'Brien, K Sampson, D Maher, DJ McLoughlin and D Cleary 0-1 each.

== Knockout stage ==
=== Relegation playoff ===
21 September 2025 Playoff	Seir Kieran	0-18 - 1-25	Kinnitty	Grant Heating St Brendan's Park
	L Carey 0-12 (10f), J Bergin 0-3, T Dooley, K Dunne, D Mooney 0-1 each.	Report	J Dempsey 0-10 (10f), D Flangan 1-2, C Hardiman 0-4, C Robinson and O Kealey 0-3 each, S Kinsella, A Kealey and P Robinson 0-1 each.

== Knockout stage ==
=== Quarter-finals ===
20 September 2025 Quarter-final	Ballinamere	3-17 - 2-29	Kilcormac–Killoughey	Glenisk O'Connor Park
	D Ravenhill 2-4 (2-1 frees), B Duignan 0-6 (4f and 1 '65'), D Bourke 1-3, J Maher 0-2, J Fogarty, S Bourke 0-1 each.	Report	A Screeney 0-8 (6f and 1 '65'), C Mahon 1-4, C Mitchell 1-3, D Hand 0-4, J Gorman 0-3, D Kilmartin and P Geraghty 0-2 each, E Grogan, C Kiely and A Kavanagh 0-1 each.

21 September 2025 Quarter-final	Coolderry	2-19 - 1-25	Shinrone	Grant Heating St Brendan's Park
	E Burke 2-7 (5f and 1 '65'), K Connolly 0-4, D Miller 0-3, C Burke and E Ryan 0-2 each, E Parlon 0-1.	Report	E Cleary 0-6 (6f), DJ McLoughin 0-5, J Sampson 1-1, K Sampson 0-3, L Watkins, D Doughan, A Landy (1f), D Morkan (2f) and P Cleary 0-2 each.

=== Semi-finals ===
4 October 2025 Semi-final	Birr	1-20 - 0-24	Kilcormac–Killoughey	Glenisk O'Connor Park
	E Cahill 0-8 (6f and 1 '65'), C Mulrooney 0-4, A Watkins 1-1, L Nolan 0-3, M Watkins 0-2, J Ryan and L Quinn 0-1 each.	Report	A Screeney 0-8 (4f), C Mitchell 0-5, J Screeney 0-4, E Grogan, J Gorman and D Hand 0-2 each, C Slevin 0-1 (f).

5 October 2025 Semi-final	Belmont	0-22 - 4-18	Shinrone	Grant Heating St Brendan's Park
	D Nally 0-13 (12f), O Kelly 0-3 (1f), R McEvoy and P Clancy 0-2 each, A Egan and R Flynn 0-1 each.	Report	DJ McLoughlin 2-3, D Morkan 1-3 (3f), K Sampson 1-1, P Cleary, A Landy, A Cleary 0-2 each, E Cleary (f), E Bailey-O'Brien, D Cleary, S Cleary and J Liffey 0-1 each.

=== Final ===
19 October 2025 Final	Kilcormac–Killoughey	1-24 - 2-14	Shinrone	Glenisk O’Connor Park
	C Mitchell 1-5, A Screeney 0-4 (2fs), D Kilmartin 0-3, C Slevin 0-3f, D Hand 0-2, C Spain 0-2, C Kiely 0-1, E Grogan 0-1, C Mahon 0-1, T Spain 0-1, A Kavanagh 0-1.	Report	D Morkan 0-6 (6fs), A Landy 0-3, K Sampson 0-3, E Bailey O’Brien 1-0, S Cleary 1-0, E Cleary 0-1f, C Cleary 0-1.	Referee: A Kinahan (Clodiagh Gaels)

== Championship statistics ==
=== Top scorers ===
Overall

Rank	Player	Club	Tally	Total	Matches	Average
1	Adam Screeney	Kilcormac–Killoughey	1-51	54	6	9.00
2	Eoghan Cahill	Birr	1-50	53	5	10.60
3	David Nally	Belmont	0-51	51	5	10.20
4	Luke Carey	Seir Kieran	1-47	50	5	10.00
5	Brian Duignan	Ballinamere	3-40	49	5	9.80
6	Eoin Burke	Coolderry	3-37	46	5	9.20
7	Shane Dooley	Tullamore	2-39	45	4	11.25
8	James Dempsey	Kinnitty	1-30	33	5	6.50
9	Charlie Mitchell	Kilcormac–Killoughey	3-20	29	6	4.83
10	D. J. McLoughlin	Shinrone	2-22	28	7	4.00
10	Donal Morkan	Shinrone	1-25	28	7	4.00

Single game

Rank	Player	Club	Tally	Total	Opposition
1	Brian Duignan	Ballinamere	2-11	17	Birr
2	Adam Screeney	Kilcormac–Killoughey	1-13	16	St Rynagh's
3	Eoghan Cahill	Birr	0-14	14	Seir Kieran
4	Eoin Burke	Coolderry	2-07	13	Shinrone
4	Luke Carey	Seir Kieran	1-10	13	Coolderry
4	David Nally	Belmont	0-13	13	St Rynagh's
4	David Nally	Belmont	0-13	13	Shinrone
4	David Nally	Belmont	0-13	13	Shinrone
9	Eoghan Cahill	Birr	1-09	12	Coolderry
9	Brian Duignan	Ballinamere	1-09	12	Seir Kieran
9	Shane Dooley	Tullamore	1-09	12	Birr
9	Shane Dooley	Tullamore	0-12	12	Coolderry
9	Luke Carey	Seir Kieran	0-12	12	Kinnitty
