= Luke O'Connor (hurler) =

Irish hurler

Luke O'Conno
Personal information
- Native name: Lúc Ó Conchúir (Irish)
- Born: 2000 (age 25–26) Banagher, County Offaly, Ireland
- Occupation: Student

Sport
- Sport: Hurling
- Position: Centre-forward
Club
- Years: Club
- St. Rynagh's
Club titles
- Offaly titles: 3
Inter-county
- Years: County
- 2021-: Offaly
Inter-county titles
- Leinster titles: 0
- All-Irelands: 0
- NHL: 0
- All Stars: 0

Luke O'Connor (born 2000) is an Irish hurler who plays for Offaly Championship club St. Rynagh's and at inter-county level with the Offaly senior hurling team. He usually lines out as a forward.

== Career ==
O'Connor first came to prominence as a hurler at club level with St. Rynagh's. After beginning at juvenile and underage levels, he eventually progressed to senior level and was part of the St. Rynagh's team that won three consecutive County Championship titles between 2019 and 2021. O'Connor first appeared on the inter-county scene as a member of the Offaly minor hurling team before progressing onto the under-20 team. As a member of the Offaly senior hurling team since 2021, he has enjoyed National League and Christy Ring Cup successes.

== Career statistics ==
As of match played 1 August 2021.

Team	Year	National League			Ring Cup		Total	
Team	Year	Division	Apps	Score	Apps	Score	Apps	Score
Offaly	2021	Division 2A	3	0-05	3	0-04	6	0-09
Total			3	0-05	3	0-04	6	0-09

== Honours ==
St. Rynagh's

- Offaly Senior Hurling Championship: 2019, 2020, 2021

Offaly

- Christy Ring Cup: 2021
- National Hurling League Division 2A: 2021
