= 2020 Offaly Senior Hurling Championship =

Annual hurling competition season

- Dates: 31 July 2020 – 14 August 2021
- Teams: 8
- Sponsor: Molloy Environmental
- Champions: St Rynagh's (19th title); Conor Clancy (captain); Ken Hogan (manager)
- Runners-up: Kilcormac–Killoughey; Enda Grogan (captain); Tom Murphy (manager)

Tournament statistics
- Matches played: 15
- Goals scored: 30 (2 per match)
- Points scored: 444 (29.6 per match)
- Top scorer(s): Eoghan Cahill (0-45)

The 2020 Offaly Senior Hurling Championship was the 123rd staging of the Offaly Senior Hurling Championship since its establishment by the Offaly County Board in 1896. The beginning of the championship was postponed indefinitely due to the impact of the COVID-19 pandemic on Gaelic games. The championship eventually began on 31 July 2020 and, after being suspended once again, eventually ended on 14 August 2021.

St Rynagh's entered the championship as the defending champions.

The final was played on 14 August 2021 at Bord na Móna O’Connor Park in Tullamore, between St Rynagh's and Kilcormac–Killoughey, in what was their second meeting in a final in three seasons. St Rynagh's won the match by 1–19 to 1–13 to claim their 19th championship title overall and a second title in succession.

Birr's Eoghan Cahill was the championship's Top scorer with 0–45.

== Group 1 ==
=== Group 1 table ===
Advance to knockout stage

Team	Matches				Score			Pts
Team	Pld	W	D	L	For	Against	Diff	Pts
Kilcormac–Killoughey	3	3	0	0	71	64	7	6
Birr	3	2	0	1	73	47	26	4
Coolderry	3	1	0	2	55	72	-17	2
Seir Kieran	3	0	0	3	62	78	-16	0

=== Group 1 results ===
31 July 2020 Round 1	Birr	0-14 - 0-17	Kilcormac–Killoughey	St Rynagh's Park
	E Cahill 0-8, C Mulrooney 0-2, C Taylor 0-1, B Murphy 0-1.	Report	Cillian Kiely 0-4, C Mahon 0-3, P Geraghty 0-3, Cathal Kiely 0-3, C Slevin 0-2, J Screeney 0-1, G Healion 0-1.

1 August 2020 Round 1	Coolderry	1-16 - 0-18	Seir Kieran	St Brendan's Park
	D Tooher 1-6 (4 frees), B Carroll 0-5 (2 frees, 1 65), M Bergin and K Connolly 0-2 each, E Ryan 0-1.	Report	A Hynes 0-10 (8 frees), B Kealy 0-2, E Murphy 0-2 (frees), J Scully, J Mulrooney, K Connor, S Ryan 0-1 each.

29 August 2020 Round 2	Kilcormac–Killoughey	1-23 - 1-22	Colderry	St Brendan's Park
	Cathal Kiely 0-10 (6f and one “65”), L Kavanagh 1-3, T Geraghty and Cillian Kiely (1f) 0-3 each, C Mahon 0-2, J Screeney and G Healion 0-1 each.	Report	B Carroll 0-8 (5f), D Miller 1-4, S Corcoran (2f), M Bergin, C Parlon and K Connolly 0-2 each, B Teehan and S Burke 0-1 each.

5 September 2020 Round 2	Seir Kieran	1-16 - 1-28	Birr	Bord na Móna O’Connor Park
	J Bergin 1-9 (goal from a penalty and 8f), T Dooley 0-3, A Hynes and K Dunne 0-2 each.	Report	E Cahill 0-13 (10f), B Harding 1-1, M Watkins 0-4, N Lyons and L Nolan 0-3 each, B Murphy 0-2, R Carty and P Cleary 0-1 each.

12 September 2020 Round 3	Seir Kieran	2-19 - 3-19	Kilcormac–Killoughey	Kinnitty Grounds
	J Bergin 0-15 (0-11f), A Hynes 2-0, T Dooley 0-2, D Mooney, J Mulrooney 0-1 each.	Report	Cathal Kiely: 0-5 (0-3f), J Geraghty 1-2, Cillian Kiely 1-2 (0-1f) C Mahon 0-4, C Slevin 0-3 (0-2f), L Kavanagh 0-2, G Healion 1-0, T Spain 0-1.

12 September 2020 Round 3	Birr	3-19 - 0-11	Coolderry	Rath Grounds
	E Cahill 0-10 (7f), N Lyons 2-2, M Watkins 0-3, B Harding 1-0, S Lonergan 0-2, L Nolan and B Murphy 0-1 each.	Report	B Carroll 0-5 (2f and one '65'), S Connolly, D Connolly, D Miller, C Parlon, D Tooher and D Parlon 0-1 each.

== Group 2 ==
=== Group 2 table ===
Advance to knockout stage

Team	Matches				Score			Pts
Team	Pld	W	D	L	For	Against	Diff	Pts
St Rynagh's	3	3	0	0	71	62	9	6
Belmont	3	2	0	1	66	55	11	4
Shinrone	3	0	1	2	73	82	-9	1
Ballinamere	3	0	2	1	63	74	-11	1

=== Group 2 results ===
31 July 2020 Round 1	Shinrone	2-22 - 3-19	Ballinamere	Rath Grounds
	K Sampson 0-9 (3 frees, 1 65, 1 sideline), A Cleary 1-3, C Doughan 1-1, S Cleary, D Morkan and D Doughan 0-2 each, C Cleary, M Morkan and DJ McLoughlin 0-1 each	Report	B Duignan 0-12 (9 frees), J Murphy 3-0, A Maher 0-4, D Wyer 0-2, C Burke 0-1.

1 August 2020 Round 1	St Rynagh's	0-20 - 1-14	Belmont	Bord na Móna O’Connor Park
	S Dolan 0-4, D Tierney 0-3, J O'Connor, G Conneely, L O'Connor (1f) and A Kenny 0-2 each, P Camon, D Shortt, B Conneely, S Quirke and R Hughes 0-1 each.	Report	O Kelly 1-4 (Goal from a sideline and 1f), D Nally 0-5 (4f), L Fox 0-2 (1 '65'), J Clancy, C Egan and M Cahill 0-1 each.

29 August 2020 Round 2	Belmont	2-22 - 0-21	Shinrone	St Brendan's Park
	D Nally 0-11 (9f), O Kelly 0-6, D Cox 1-1, D Kenny 1-0, J Nally, L Fox (f), C Flynn and J Maher 0-1 each.	Report	K Sampson 0-12 (10f), J Sampson 0-3, S Cleary and A Cleary 0-2 each, C Cleary and DJ McLoughlin 0-1 each.

30 August 2020 Round 2	Ballinamere	1-18 - 2-19	St Rynagh's	Bord na Móna O’Connor Park
	B Duignan 1-9 (goal from a penalty and 6f), A Maher 0-4, J Maher 0-3, J Murphy and K McDermott 0-1 each.	Report	A Treacy 0-9 (7f), L O'Connor 1-4 (2f), A Kenny 1-1, S Quirke 0-3, R Hughes and S Dolan 0-1 each.

12 September 2020 Round 3	Ballinamere	1-11 - 1-18	Belmont	Bord na Móna O’Connor Park
	B Duignan (0-6), J Murphy (1-2), C Burke (0-2), C McDonald (0-1).	Report	O Kelly (1-2), D Nally (0-5); J Maher (0-4), D Cox (0-3), C Egan (0-2); L Fox (0-2).

12 September 2020 Round 3	St Rynagh's	1-23 - 3-15	Shinrone	St Brendan's Park
	S Quirke 1-4, R Hughes 0-4, S Dolan 0-3, A Kenny 0-3 (two frees), L O’Connor 0-3 (two frees), A Treacy 0-3 (frees) P Quirke 0-2, P Quirke 0-1.	Report	K Sampson 0-5 (two frees), S Cleary 1-2, A Cleary 0-4, DJ McLoughlin 1-1, J Sampson 0-3, D Doughan 1-0,

== Knockout stage ==
=== Semi-finals ===
26 September 2020 Semi-final	Belmont	1-18 - 1-22	Kilcormac–Killoughey	St Brendan's Park
	D Nally 0-9, M Cahill 1-0, A Egan 0-2, L Fox 0-2, O Kelly 0-2, C Egan 0-1, D Egan 0-1, D Cox 0-1.		Cathal Kiely 1-8, Cillian Kiely 0-4, C Mahon 0-4, L Kavanagh 0-2, J Gorman 0-1, D Murray 0-1, J Screeney 0-1, T Geraghty 0-1.

27 September 2020 Semi-final	Birr	0-17 - 1-20	St Rynagh's	Bord na Móna O’Connor Park
	E Cahill 0-14, S Lonergan 0-1, B Murphy 0-1, M Watkins 0-1.		A Kenny 1-7, A Treacy 0-3, S Dolan 0-3, L O'Connor 0-2, M Maloney 0-1, S Quirke 0-1, R Hughes 0-1, D Horan 0-1, C Flannery 0-1.

=== Final ===
14 August 2021 Final	St Rynagh's	1-19 - 1-13	Kilcormac–Killoughey	Bord na Móna O’Connor Park
	A Treacy 0-7 (5f and one sideline), A Kenny 1-4 (4f), L O'Connor 0-3, R Hughes 0-2, B Conneely, S Dolan and G Conneely 0-1 each.		L Kavanagh 1-3, C Slevin 0-6 (6f), D Murray 0-2, C Mahon and T Geraghty 0-1 each.

== Championship statistics ==
=== Top scorers ===
Rank	Player	Club	Tally	Total	Matches	Average
1	Eoghan Cahill	Birr	0-45	45	4	11.25
2	Brian Duignan	Ballinamere	1-27	30	3	10.00
2	David Nally	Belmont	0-30	30	4	7.50
4	Cathal Kiely	Kilcormac–Killoughey	1-26	29	4	7.25
5	Joe Bergin	Seir Kieran	1-24	27	2	13.50
6	Aaron Kenny	St Rynagh's	3-17	26	5	5.20
6	Killian Sampson	Shinrone	0-26	26	3	8.66
8	Oisín Kelly	Belmont	2-14	20	3	6.66
9	Adrian Hynes	Seir Kieran	2-12	18	3	6.00
9	Brian Carroll	Coolderry	0-18	18	3	6.00
