= 2021 Offaly Senior Hurling Championship =

Annual hurling competition season

- Dates: 28 August – 21 November 2021
- Teams: 10
- Sponsor: Molloy Environmental
- Champions: St Rynagh's (20th title); Conor Clancy (captain); Ken Hogan (manager)
- Runners-up: Coolderry; David King (captain); Brian Culbert (manager)
- Relegated: Drumcullen

Tournament statistics
- Matches played: 29
- Goals scored: 62 (2.14 per match)
- Points scored: 993 (34.24 per match)
- Top scorer(s): Brian Carroll (4–67)

The 2021 Offaly Senior Hurling Championship was the 124th staging of the Offaly Senior Hurling Championship since its establishment by the Offaly County Board in 1896. The group stage placings were confirmed on 28 May 2021. The championship began on 28 August 2021 and ended on 21 November 2021.

St Rynagh's were the defending champions. Drumcullen and Kinnitty joined the championship as the number of participating teams increased from eight to ten.

The final was played on 21 November 2021 at Bord na Móna O'Connor Park in Tullamore, between St Rynagh's and Coolderry, in what was their first meeting in a final in six years. St Rynagh's won the match by 1–11 to 0–12 to claim their 20th championship title overall and a third title in succession.

Coolderry's Brian Carroll was the championship's top scorer with 4–67.

== Team changes ==
=== To championship ===
Promoted from the Offaly Senior B Hurling Championship

- Drumcullen
- Kinnitty

== Group stage ==
=== Group stage table ===
Advance to knockout stage Advance to relegation playoff

Team	Matches				Score			Pts
Team	Pld	W	D	L	For	Against	Diff	Pts
Coolderry	5	4	0	1	130	83	47	8
Kilcormac–Killoughey	5	4	0	1	127	87	40	8
St Rynagh's	5	4	0	1	108	99	9	8
Shinrone	5	3	0	2	121	94	27	6
Birr	5	3	0	2	104	80	24	6
Ballinamere	5	2	1	2	113	112	1	5
Belmont	5	2	1	2	81	91	-10	5
Kinnitty	5	2	0	3	81	103	-22	4
Seir Kieran	5	0	0	5	89	131	-42	0
Drumcullen	5	0	0	5	66	140	-74	0

=== Group stage results ===
28 August 2021 Round 1	Birr	2-19 - 0-15	Drumcullen	Bord na Móna O'Connor Park
	L Quinn 0-7 (5f), L Nolan 1-3, D Quegan 1-2, R Carty, C Mulrooney and P Mullins 0-2 each, B Harding 0-1.	Report	Colm Gath 0-8 (3f), Conor Gath 0-5 (4f), D Gath and E Gath 0-1 each.

28 August 2021 Round 1	Coolderry	0-26 - 0-16	Belmont	St Brendan's Park
	B Carroll 0-11 (0-9f, 0-1 ‘65’), K Connolly 0-4, E Parlon 0-3, C Molloy and D Tooher 0-2 each, S Corcoran (f), E Ryan, G McCormack, C Burke all 0-1 each.	Report	D Nally 0-8 (0-7f), O Kelly 0-4 (0-1 s/l), C Egan 0-2, L Fox, A Egan 0-1 each.

28 August 2021 Round 1	Kilcormac–Killoughey	3-25 - 0-15	Seir Kieran	Bord na Móna O'Connor Park
	Cillian Kiely 0-10 (5f), C Mahon 1-3, K Guinan 1-1, L Kavanagh and Cathal Kiely 0-3 each, C Donoghue 1-0, C Mitchell 0-2, J Kilmartin, T Spain and G Healion 0-1 each.	Report	J Mulrooney 0-6, J Bergin 0-5 (3f), L Carey 0-2 (1f), K Dunne and B Kealey 0-1 each.

28 August 2021 Round 1	Kinnitty	1-12 - 0-23	St Rynagh's	St Brendan's Park
	C Leonard 0-3 (0-2F, 0-1 ‘65’), A Browne 1-0, C Coughlan and O Kealey 0-2f each, J Armstrong 0-2, D Flanagan, P Delaney, E Callaghan, 0-1 each.	Report	L O’Connor 0-5 (0-2F), A Kenny 0-5 (0-3F), S Quirke 0-4, B Conneely, S Wynne, N Wynne 0-2 each, P Quirke, S Og Lyons, D Shortt 0-1 each.

28 August 2021 Round 1	Ballinamere	2-15 - 4-18	Shinrone	Rath Grounds
	B Duignan 1-7 (4f), S Duignan 1-2 (1 sideline), D Wyer, J Murphy and C Spollen 0-2 each.	Report	J Sampson 2-0, K Sampson 1-3 (1f), JP Cleary 0-5 (1f), A Cleary 0-3, P Cleary 1-0, D Crean and S Cleary 0-2 each, D Maher, C Doughan and D Morkan 0-1 each.

11 September 2021 Round 2	Birr	0-25 - 1-13	Seir Kieran	Bord na Móna O'Connor Park
	E Cahill 0-16 (0-12F, 0-1 s/l), B Murphy 0-4, C Mulrooney, E Pilkington, R Carty, L Nolan, M Watkins 0-1 each.	Report	J Bergin 0-7 (0-6F, 0-1 ‘65’, B Kealey 1-0, J Mulrooney, K Dunne 0-2 each, S Coughlan and S Ryan 0-1 each

12 September 2021 Round 2	Kinnitty	1-20 - 1-14	Drumcullen	St Brendan's Park
	C Coughlan 0-10 (0-7F), S Kinsella 1-1, J Hardiman 0-3 (0-2F), A Kealey and T Leahy 0-2 each, B Donnelly and A Browne 0-1 each.	Report	Conor Gath 0-6 (0-6F), Colm Gath 1-1 (1-0F), P Guinan 0-3, D Gath 0-2, E Gath and J Murray 0-1 each.

12 September 2021 Round 2	Kilcormac–Killoughey	1-16 - 0-16	Belmont	Bord na Móna O'Connor Park
	Cillian Kiely 0-10 (7f), C Mahon 1-2, L Kavanagh 0-3, J Screeney 0-1.	Report	D Nally 0-15 (14f and one sideline), L Fox 0-1 (f).

12 September 2021 Round 2	Ballinamere	0-19 - 1-18	St Rynagh's	Bord na Móna O'Connor Park
	B Duignan 0-10 (7f), J Murphy 0-4, S Bourke, C Burke, M O'Brien, S Duignan and J Maher 0-1 each.	Report	A Treacy 0-8 (5f and 1 “65”), S Quirke 1-2, G Conneely and N Wynne 0-3 each, M Maloney and L O'Connor 0-1 each.

12 September 2021 Round 2	Coolderry	1-18 - 0-19	Shinrone	St Brendan's Park
	B Carroll 0-8 (2 65s, 1f), K Connolly 0-4, E Ryan 1-0, D Miller and B Teehan 0-2 each, D Tooher and E Parlon 0-1 each.	Report	P Cleary and A Cleary 0-5 each, S Cleary 0-4, K Sampson 0-3 (frees), D Doughan, JP Cleary (f) 0-1 each.

26 September 2021 Round 3	Kilcormac–Killoughey	1-20 - 0-16	Shinrone	St Rynagh's Park
	C Kiely 0-11 (5f and 3 '65's), C Mahon 0-5, L Kavanagh 1-1, C Donoghue, P Geraghty and C Donoghue 0-1 each.	Report	K Sampson 0-7 (6f and 1 '65'), S Cleary 0-4, C Doughan 0-2, D Doughan, D Crean and JP Cleary 0-1 each.

26 September 2021 Round 3	Birr	0-10 - 0-11	Belmont	Bord na Móna O'Connor Park
	E Cahill 0-7 (3 frees, 1 65), L Nolan, B Murphy and C Mulrooney 0-1.	Report	D Nally 0-8 (6 frees, 1 65), P Clancy, L Fox (free) and C Egan 0-1 each.

26 September 2021 Round 3	Kinnitty	0-17 - 1-12	Seir Kieran	St Brendan's Park
	C Coughlan 0-12 (9f and 1 '65), O Kealey 0-2, J Hardiman and B Coughlan 0-1 each.	Report	E Murphy 1-3 (penalty and 3f), J Bergin 0-4 (2f), K Dunne, L Carey, K Connors, S Dunne and T Dooley 0-1 each.

26 September 2021 Round 3	Ballinamere	0-17 - 0-15	Drumcullen	Bord na Móna O'Connor Park
	B Duignan 0-9 (8 frees, 1 65), J Murphy 0-4, J Maher 0-2, A Maher and S Bourke 0-1 each.	Report	Conor Gath 0-10 (9 frees, 1 65), Colm Gath 0-4, J Murray 0-1.

26 September 2021 Round 3	Coolderry	1-15 - 3-12	St Rynagh's	St Brendan's Park
	B Carroll 1-10 (goal from a penalty, 7f), K Connolly 0-3, D Miller and K Brady 0-1 each.	Report	L O'Connor 1-4 (3f), N Wynne 2-0, A Treacy 0-3 (2f), G Conneely and S Quirke 0-2 each, J O'Connor 0-1.

9 October 2021 Round 4	Birr	0-18 - 2-19	Shinrone	Coolderry Grounds
	E Cahill (0-14, 0-11 frees), D Quegan (0-2), M Watkins and C Mulrooney (0-1 each).	Report	K Sampson (0-9, 0-8 frees), J Sampson (1-5), DJ McLoughlin (1-1), A Cleary (0-2), P Cleary and D Morkan (0-1 each).

10 October 2021 Round 4	Ballinamere	4-23 - 3-16	Seir Kieran	Bord na Móna O'Connor Park
	J Murphy 3-6, B Duignan 0-8 (4f), A Maher 1-2, S Guinan 0-3, C Guinan, M O’Brien, S Bourke and K McDermott 0-1 each.	Report	J Bergin 2-9 (7f), J Mulrooney 1-1, S Coughlan and A Hynes 0-2 each, L Carey and E Murphy 0-1 each.

10 October 2021 Round 4	Coolderry	6-27 - 0-09	Drumcullen	St Brendan's Park
	B Carroll 3-15 (1-11f, 1-0 pen), K Connolly 1-5, K Brady and M Corcoran 1-0 each, E Ryan and C Burke 0-2 each, C Molloy, T Corcoran, D Miller all 0-1 each.	Report	Conor Gath 0-8 (0-8F), Colm Gath 0-1.

10 October 2021 Round 4	Kilcormac–Killoughey	0-21 - 2-24	St Rynagh's	Bord na Móna O'Connor Park
	Cillian Kiely 0-9 (6 frees, 1 65), C Mitchell 0-3, J Kilmartin, P Geraghty and C Mahon 0-2 each, Cathal Kiely (free), L Kavanagh and D Murray 0-1 each.	Report	A Treacy 0-9 (frees), L O’Connor 1-3 (3 frees), S Dolan 0-4, A Kenny 1-0, S Quirke 0-3, S Og Lyons, R Hughes, M Maloney, C Flannery and P Camon 0-1 each.

10 October 2021 Round 4	Kinnitty	0-15 - 0-17	Belmont	St Brendan's Park
	C Coughlan 0-11 (0-8F), B Donnelly, J Armstrong, E Callaghan, O Kealey all 0-1 each.	Report	D Nally 0-5 (0-4F), P Clancy 0-4, J Egan, D Egan, C Flynn all 0-2 each, J Clancy, D Cox 0-1 each.

24 October 2025 Round 5	Ballinamere	2-15 - 1-18	Belmont	Clara Grounds
	B Duignan 0-7 (5f, 165), A Maher 1-4, J Murphy 1-1, S Duignan, J Maher and M O’Brien 0-1 each.	Report	D Nally 1-13 (1pen, 10 frees) A Egan, P Clancy, M Egan (f), C Flynn and K McManus 0-1 each

24 October 2025 Round 5	Coolderry	0-20 - 1-15	Seir Kieran	Crinkill Grounds
	B Carroll (0-14, 0-11 frees), K Connolly (0-3), D Miller, K Brady, M Corcoran (0-1 each).	Report	J Bergin (0-8, 0-7 frees), J Mulrooney (1-1), K Murray (one sideline cut) and K Dunne (0-2 each), A Hynes and J Scully (0-1 each).

24 October 2025 Round 5	Kinnitty	0-11 - 4-19	Shinrone	St Brendan's Park
	C Coughlan 0-7 (4f and 1 '65'), S Kinsella 0-2, J Hardiman (f) and O Kealey 0-1 each.	Report	K Sampson 0-8 (6f), J Sampson 2-2, S Cleary 1-2, P Cleary 1-0 (1f), A Cleary 0-4, D Maher, D Morkan and JP Cleary 0-1 each.

24 October 2025 Round 5	Kilcormac–Killoughey	2-24 - 0-10	Drumcullen	Bord na Móna O'Connor Park
	Cillian Kiely 2-7 (0-4 Frees, 0-1 ’65), D Murray 0-6, L Kavanagh 0-2, Cathal Kiely 0-2, P Geraghty 0-2, J Kilmartin 0-2, G Healion 0-2, K Guinan 0-1.	Report	Colm Gath 0-8 (0-7 Frees), C Guinan 0-1, E Gath 0-1.

24 October 2025 Round 5	Birr	1-23 - 0-13	St Rynagh's	Carrig Grounds
	E Cahill 0-14(0-9F, 0-1 ‘65’), M Watkins 1-1, L Quinn 0-3, C Mulrooney and B Murphy 0-2 each, L Nolan 0-1.	Report	L O’Connor 0-6 (0-6F), A Treacy 0-3 (0-1F, 0-1 ‘65’), J O’Connor, D Shortt, S Dolan, P Quirke all 0-1 each.

== Relegation stage ==
=== Relegation playoff ===
6 November 2021 Playoff	Seir Kieran	2-22 - 2-17	Drumcullen	Kinnitty Grounds
	J Bergin (0-13, 0-12 frees), L Carey (1-2), K Dunne (0-4), A Hynes (1-0), B Kealey, J Scully, J Mulrooney (0-1 each).	Report	C Gath (1-14, 1-11 frees), D Gath (1-0), J Murray, M Kennedy Jnr, K Fleury (0-1 each).

== Knockout stage ==
=== Semi-finals ===
6 November 2021 Semi-final	Coolderry	3-13 - 1-16	Shinrone	St Brendan's Park
	K Connolly 1-3, D Miller 1-1, S Corcoran 0-4 (4f), B Carroll 0-3 (1f), C Burke 1-0, C Molloy and E Ryan 0-1 each.	Report	K Sampson 0-7 (6f), J Sampson 1-2, S Cleary 0-4, A Cleary 0-2, P Cleary 0-1.

7 November 2021 Semi-final	St Rynagh's	1-18 - 0-20	Kilcormac–Killoughey	Bord na Móna O'Connor Park
	L O'Connor 1-8 (8f), S Quirke 0-3, A Kenny 0-2, B Conneely, M Maloney, R Hughes and G Conneely 0-1 each.	Report	Cathal Kiely 0-12 (8f), D Murray 0-4, P Geraghty 0-2, J Screeney and G Healion 0-1 each.

=== Final ===
21 November 2021 Final	Coolderry	0-12 - 1-11	St Rynagh's	Bord na Móna O'Connor Park
	B Carroll 0-6 (3f), K Connolly 0-3, E Ryan 0-2, D King 0-1.	Report	A Treacy 0-5 (1f 1 65), S Quirke 1-1, L O’Connor 0-2 (1f), A Kenny, G Conneely, P Quirke 0-1 each.	Referee: K Dooley (Drumcullen)

== Championship statistics ==
=== Top scorers ===
Rank	Player	Club	Tally	Total	Matches	Average
1	Brian Carroll	Coolderry	4-67	79	7	11.28
2	Cillian Kiely	Kilcormac–Killoughey	2-47	53	5	10.60
3	Joe Bergin	Seir Kieran	2-46	52	6	8.66
3	David Nally	Belmont	1-49	52	5	10.40
5	Eoghan Cahill	Birr	0-51	51	4	12.75
6	Brian Duignan	Ballinamere	1-41	44	7	6.28
7	Colm Coughlan	Kinnitty	0-42	42	4	10.50
8	Killian Sampson	Shinrone	1-37	40	6	6.66
9	Luke O'Connor	St Rynagh's	3-29	38	7	5.42
10	Kevin Connolly	Coolderry	2-25	31	7	4.42
