= Seán Dolan =

Irish hurler

Personal information
- Native name: Seán Ó Dúláin (Irish)
- Born: 1993 (age 32–33) Cloghan, County Offaly, Ireland
- Occupation: Secondary school teacher

Sport
- Sport: Hurling
- Position: Centre-forward
Club
- Years: Club
- St Rynagh's
Club titles
- Offaly titles: 4
Inter-county*
Years	County	Apps (scores)
2019-2020	Offaly	2 (0-00)
Inter-county titles
- Leinster titles: 0
- All-Irelands: 0
- NHL: 0
- All Stars: 0
- *Inter County team apps and scores correct as of 15:39, 22 April 2026.

Seán Dolan (born 1993) is an Irish hurler. At club level, he plays with St Rynagh's and at inter-county level is a former member of the Offaly senior hurling team.

== Career ==
Born in Cloghan, County Offaly, Dolan attended Banagher College where he played in all grades of hurling and Gaelic football. He was part of the school's senior hurling team that win the All-Ireland VS SAHC title in 2010, following a 3–17 to 2–09 win over Causeway Comprehensive School in the final.

At club level, Dolan first played for St Rynagh's as a dual player at juvenile and underage levels. He progressed to adult level and captained the club's senior hurlers to the Offaly SHC title in 2016. Dolan was also part of the St Rynagh's three-in-a-row Offaly SHC-winning teams in 2019, 2020 and 2021. He also won an Offaly IFC medal with St Rynagh's in 2020.

Dolan first appeared on the inter-county scene for Offaly as a member of the minor team in 2010. He later spent two years with the under-21 team. Dolan made his senior team debut in a National Hurling League game against Waterford in January 2019. He left the panel in 2020.

== Honours ==
Banagher College

- All-Ireland Vocational Schools Senior A Hurling Championship (1): 2010

St Rynagh's

- Offaly Senior Hurling Championship (4): 2016 (c), 2019, 2020, 2021
- Offaly Intermediate Football Championship (1): 2020
- Offaly Minor A Hurling Championship (2): 2009, 2010
