= Jason Sampson (hurler) =

Irish hurler

Personal information
- Born: 1993 (age 32–33) Shinrone, County Offaly, Ireland

Sport
- Sport: Hurling
- Position: Midfield
Club
- Years: Club
- Shinrone
Club titles
- Offaly titles: 1
Inter-county
- Years: County
- 2016-present: Offaly
Inter-county titles
- Leinster titles: 0
- All-Irelands: 0
- NHL: 0
- All Stars: 0

Jason Sampson (born 1993) is an Irish hurler who plays for Offaly Championship club Shinrone and at inter-county level with the Offaly senior hurling team. He is a brother of Killian Sampson.

== Career ==
Born in Shinrone, County Offaly, Sampson first came to hurling prominence at juvenile and underage levels with the Shinrone club before eventually progressing onto the club's senior team. He first appeared on the inter-county scene with the Offaly minor team before later lining out with the under-21 side. Sampson made his first appearance with the Offaly senior hurling team during the 2016 National League. He secured his first silverware during the 2021 season, when Offaly claimed the National League Division 2A and Christy Ring Cup titles. He won a Joe McDonagh Cup medal as team captain after a defeat of Laois in the 2024 final.

== Honours ==
Shinrone

- Offaly Senior Hurling Championship: 2022 (c)

Offaly

- Joe McDonagh Cup: 2024
- Christy Ring Cup: 2021
- National Hurling League Division 2A: 2021

Sporting positions
Preceded by Ben Conneely	Offaly senior hurling team captain 2023-2024	Succeeded by Ciarán Burke
Achievements
Preceded by Paul Doyle	Joe McDonagh Cup winning captain 2024	Succeeded by Rian Boran
