= Sean Dolan =

Sean Dolan may refer to:

- Sean Dolan (ice hockey) (born 1988), American ice hockey player.
- Sean Dolan (hurler) (born 1993), Irish hurler
- Sean Dolan (runner) (born 2001), American middle-distance runner
- Bloodwraith, fictional Marvel character also known as Sean Dolan
- Sean Dolan, member of the Blue Meanies (Illinois band)
- Sean Dolan, actor in American film V/H/S/94
