= 2019 Offaly Senior Hurling Championship =

Annual hurling competition season

- Dates: 30 March – 20 October 2019
- Teams: 8
- Sponsor: Molloy Environmental
- Champions: St Rynagh's (18th title); Conor Clancy (captain); Ken Hogan (manager)
- Runners-up: Birr; Barry Harding (captain); Barry Whelahan (manager)
- Relegated: Kinnitty

Tournament statistics
- Matches played: 34
- Top scorer(s): Eoghan Cahill (2–82)

The 2019 Offaly Senior Hurling Championship was the 122nd staging of the Offaly Senior Hurling Championship since its establishment by the Offaly County Board in 1896. The championship began on 30 March 2019 and ended on 20 October 2019.

Coolderry were the defending champions, however, they were defeated by Belmont at the quarter-final stage.

On 20 October 2019, St Rynagh's won the championship following a 0–16 to 1–12 defeat of Birr in the final at Bord na Móna O'Connor Park. This was their 18th championship title overall and their first title since 2016.

Birr's Eoghan Cahill was the championship's top scorer with 2–83.

== Group stage ==
=== Group stage table ===
Semi-finalists Quarter-finalists Relegation playoff

Team	Matches				Score			Pts
Team	Pld	W	D	L	For	Against	Diff	Pts
St Rynagh's	7	5	1	1	153	121	32	11
Kilcormac–Killoughey	7	5	1	1	138	118	20	11
Belmont	7	4	2	1	148	131	17	10
Shinrone	7	5	0	2	155	130	25	10
Birr	7	2	3	2	137	129	8	7
Coolderry	7	2	0	5	129	139	−10	4
Ballinamare	7	1	0	6	124	179	−55	2
Kinnitty	7	0	1	6	102	139	−37	1

=== Group stage results ===
30 March 2019 Round 1	Shinrone	0-16 - 1-16	Kilcormac–Killoughey	Rath Grounds
	JP Cleary 0-6, K Sampson 0-2, D Dooughan 0-2, A Cleary 0-2, J Sampson 0-2, C Doughan 0-1, D Morkan 0-1.		Cìaran Slevin 0-7, D Murray 0-3, C Mahon 0-3, J Gorman 1-0, P Geraghty 0-2, T Geraghty 0-1.

30 March 2019 Round 1	Birr	2-15 - 2-11	Coolderry	Rath Grounds
	E Cahill 0-8, T Bolger 1-2, C Mulrooney 1-2, P Cleary 0-1, B Watkins 0-1, S Ryan 0-1.		C Molloy 1-4, K Connolly 0-3, J Brady 1-0, M Corcoran 0-2, D Parlon 0-1, A Connolly 0-1.

31 March 2019 Round 1	Kinnitty	0-10 - 1-18	St Rynagh's	St Brendan's Park
	C Coughlan 0-5, A Flaherty 0-2, J Hardiman 0-1, J Dempsey 0-1, O Kealey 0-1.		A Treacy 0-10, M Maloney 1-3, G Kelly 0-2, G Conneely 0-2, C Flannery 0-1.

31 March 2019 Round 1	Ballinamere	2-13 - 4-20	Belmont	St Brendan's Park
	P Murphy 1-2, B Duignan 0-5, J Murphy 1-1, J Maher 0-3, C Spollen 0-1, M O'Brien 0-1.		O Kelly 2-3, D Nally 0-7, C Egan 1-3, J Maher 1-1, D Kenny 0-2, A Egan 0-1, D Egan 0-1, D Cox 0-1, J Clancy 0-1.

6 April 2019 Round 2	Coolderry	2-19 - 0-16	Ballinamere	St Brendan's Park
	K Connolly 1-5, E Ryan 1-2, B Carroll 0-4, E Parlon 0-2, M Bergin 0-2, M Corcoran 0-1, A Connolly 0-1, D Parlon 0-1, S Corcoran 0-1.		J Maher 0-5, B Duignan 0-4, C Spollen 0-2, A Maher 0-2, D Wyer 0-1, M O'Brien 0-1, J Murphy 0-1.

6 April 2019 Round 2	Kilcormac–Killoughey	1-13 - 2-12	St Rynagh's	St Brendan's Park
	Ciaran Slevin 0-9, C Mahon 1-1, D Murray 0-2, D Kilmartin 0-1.		A Treacy 0-10, A Kenny 1-0, R Hughes 1-0, C Flannery 0-1, M Maloney 0-1.

7 April 2019 Round 2	Birr	0-17 - 2-11	Kinnitty	Coolderry Grounds
	E Cahill 0-9, P Cleary 0-2, C Taylor 0-2, C Mulrooney 0-1, D Quegen 0-1, S Ryan 0-1.		C Coughlan 0-7, S Kinsella 1-1, J Armstrong 1-0, E Callaghan 0-2, K O'Connor 0-1.

7 April 2019 Round 2	Belmont	0-19 - 1-15	Shinrone	Rath Grounds
	D Nally 0-11, D Cox 0-2, D Egan 0-1, D Kenny 0-1, C Egan 0-1, O Kelly 0-1, R McEvoy 0-1, L Fox 0-1.		D Morkan 0-4, D Doughan 0-3, S Cleary 1-0, A Cleary 0-2, JP Cleary 0-2, J Sampson 0-1, K Sampson 0-1, Coleman Cleary 0-1, Ciaran Cleary 0-1.

13 July 2019 Round 3	Kilcormac–Killoughey	1-18 - 0-13	Kinnitty	St Rynagh's Park
	C Mahon 1-3, Ciaran Slevin 0-5, P Geraghty 0-3, D Murray 0-3, Conor Slevin 0-2, K Leonard 0-1, J Gorman 0-1.		C Coughlan 0-6, J Dempsey 0-2, K O'Connor 0-1, S Kinsella 0-1, B Donnelly 0-1, O Kealey 0-1, J Armstrong 0-1.

13 July 2019 Round 3	Shinrone	2-19 - 0-17	Coolderry	Rath Grounds
	K Sampson 0-6, C Ryan 1-2, C Doughan 0-5, C Cleary 1-1, S Cleary 0-3, M Cleary 0-1, JP Cleary 0-1.		B Carroll 0-13, K Connolly 0-3, D Parlon 0-1.

14 July 2019 Round 3	Birr	6-15 - 0-16	Ballinamere	Páirc Naomh Cormac
	E Cahill 0-9, S Ryan 2-1, M Watkins 1-1, C Mulrooney 1-0, D Hayden 1-0, T Bolger 1-0, C Taylor 0-1, B Watkins 0-1, A Whelehan 0-1, P Cleary 0-1.		B Duignan 0-10, J Maher 0-3, D Wyer 0-2, A Maher 0-1.

14 July 2019 Round 3	Belmont	1-22 - 3-16	St Rynagh's	St Brendan's Park
	D Nally 0-10, D Egan 0-5, J Maher 0-3, D Kenny 1-0, D Cox 0-2, J Clancy 0-1, L Fox 0-1.		S Quirke 1-3, A Kenny 1-2, A Treacy 0-4, S Dolan 0-3, C Flannery 1-0, J O'Connor 0-2, N Wynne 0-1, B Conneely 0-1.

27 July 2019 Round 4	St Rynagh's	3-12 - 2-10	Coolderry	St Brendan's Park
	A Kenny 1-3, N Wynne 1-0, G Conneely 1-0, J O'Connor 0-2, C Flannery 0-2, S Quirke 0-1, D Shortt 0-1, A Treacy 0-1, S Dolan 0-1, M Maloney 0-1.		B Carroll 0-4, C Molloy 1-0, J Brady 1-0, K Connolly 0-2, M Bergin 0-2, D Parlon 0-1, A Connolly 0-1.

27 July 2019 Round 4	Shiinrone	2-16 - 0-20	Birr	St Brendan's Park
	C Doughan 0-6, A Cleary 1-1, C Ryan 1-0, K Sampson 0-3, D Doughan 0-2, C Carey 0-1, JP Cleary 0-1, M Morkan 0-1, D Cleary 0-1.		E Cahill 0-12, C Mulrooney 0-2, C Taylor 0-1, D Hayden 0-1, T Bolger 0-1, B Murphy 0-1, E Pilkington 0-1, M Watkins 0-1.

27 July 2019 Round 4	Ballinamere	1-14 - 0-16	Kinnitty	Clareen Grounds
	B Duignan 1-1, D Wyer 0-4, J Murphy 0-2, J Maher 0-2, A Maher 0-2, D Magner 0-1, M O'Brien 0-1, P Murphy 0-1.		C Coughlan 0-9, B Donnelly 0-2, J Dempsey 0-2, S Kinsella 0-1, O Kealey 0-1, K Bergin 0-1.

28 July 2019 Round 4	Kilcormac–Killoughey	0-19 - 0-17	Belmont	St Rynagh's Park
	Ciarán Slevin 0-8, C Mahon 0-4, P Geraghty 0-3, D Murray 0-1, K Leonard 0-1, O Mahon 0-1, T Geraghty 0-1.		D Nally 0-9, J Maher 0-3, D Egan 0-2, M Egan 0-1, D Kelly 0-1, A Egan 0-1.

9 August 2019 Round 5	Ballinamere	0-18 - 2-22	Shinrone	Lusmagh Grounds
	B Duignan 0-9, D Wyer 0-4, P Murphy 0-3, C McDonald 0-1, J Murphy 0-1.		K Sampson 1-6, C Doughan 0-6, S Cleary 1-2, JP Cleary 0-3, D Doughan 0-1, M Cleary 0-1, C Ryan 0-1, C Cleary 0-1, A Cleary 0-1.

10 August 2019 Round 5	Birr	0-10 - 1-18	St Rynagh's	Rath Grounds
	M Watkins 0-6, P Cleary 0-2, B Hardin 0-1, C Mulrooney 0-1.		A Kenny 0-6, A Treacy 0-4, R Hughes 0-3, S Quirke 0-3, G Conneely 1-0, S Dolan 0-1, C Flannery 0-1.

10 August 2019 Round 5	Kinnitty	1-14 - 2-14	Belmont	The Mill Field
	C Coughlan 0-6, K O'Connor 1-1, S Kinsella 0-2, L Bergin 0-1, O Kealey 0-1, J Dempsey 0-1.		D Nally 0-8, D Egan 1-2, D Cox 1-1, J Clancy 0-2, M Egan 0-1.

10 August 2019 Round 5	Coolderry	0-17 - 2-17	Kilcormac–Killoughey	St Mary's Field
	B Carroll 0-9, M Bergin 0-2, A Connolly 0-2, K Connolly 0-1, D King 0-1, C Molloy 0-1, B Teehan 0-1.		Ciaran Slevin 0-9, O Mahon 2-0, C Mahon 0-2, D Murray 0-1, P Geraghty 0-1, Cillian Kiely 0-1, J Gorman 0-1, Cathal Kiely 0-1, T Geraghty 0-1.

24 August 2019 Round 6	Shinrone	2-18 - 0-16	Kinnitty	St Brendan's Park
	A Cleary 1-3, C Doughan 1-2, S Cleary 0-4, K Sampson 0-2, D Morkan 0-2, D Doughan 0-1, J Sampson 0-1, D Cleary 0-1, C Ryan 0-1, C Cleary 0-1.		C Coughlan 0-10, A Kealey 0-2, S Kinsella 0-1, O Kealey 0-1, J Dempsey 0-1, K Bergin 0-1.

24 August 2019 Round 6	Belmont	1-17 - 0-18	Coolderry	St Brendan's Park
	C Flynn 1-3, D Nally 0-6, A Egan 0-2, J Clancy 0-2, M Egan 0-1, D Kenny 0-1, D Egan 0-1, O Kelly 0-1.		K Connolly 0-5, B Carroll 0-5, G McCormack 0-2, M Bergin 0-2, C Molloy 0-1, D Parlon 0-1, C Parlon 0-1, A Connolly 0-1.

25 August 2019 Round 6	St Rynagh's	5-18 - 0-16	Ballinamere	O'Connor Park
	G Scales 1-7, L O'Connor 2-3, N White 1-2, E Houlihan 1-1, J White 0-2, P Looby 0-2, T Cox 0-1.		J McEvoy 0-12, A Walsh 0-2, M Murphy 0-1, D Troy 0-1.

25 August 2019 Round 6	Kilcormac–Killoughey	2-15 - 1-18	Birr	St Finian's Park
	Ciaran Slevin 1-8, C Mahon 1-2, C Kiely 0-3, P Geraghty 0-1, T Geraghty 0-1.		E Cahill 1-10, D Hayden 0-3, M Watkins 0-2, C Mulrooney 0-1, S Lonergan 0-1, B Murphy 0-1.

7 September 2019 Round 7	Birr	0-15 - 0-15	Belmont	Lusmagh Grounds
	C Mulrooney 0-5, E Cahill 0-4, D Hayden 0-2, B Watkins 0-1, S Lonergan 0-1, B Murphy 0-1, M Watkins 0-1.		D Nally 0-5, O Kelly 0-3, L Fox 0-1, D Kelly 0-1, A Egan 0-1, C Egan 0-1, D Egan 0-1, J Maher 0-1, C Flynn 0-1.

7 September 2019 Round 7	Kinnitty	0-13 - 1-16	Coolderry	Rath Grounds
	C Coughlan 0-5, A Kealey 0-3, S Kinsella 0-2, B Donnelly 0-1, J Dempsey 0-1, K Bergin 0-1.		B Carroll 1-6, K Connolly 0-3, D Miller 0-3, D Parlon 0-1, C Parlon 0-1, E Parlon 0-1, D Connolly 0-1.

8 September 2019 Round 7	Shinrone	0-22 - 1-18	St Rynagh's	Clareen Grounds
	K Sampson 0-10, C Doughan 0-4, S Cleary 0-2, Conor Cleary 0-1, C Ryan 0-1, Ciaran Cleary 0-1, A Cleary 0-1, Coleman Cleary 0-1, J Sampson 0-1.		A Kenny 1-4, J O'Connor 0-3, B Conneely 0-2, A Treacy 0-2, R Hughes 0-2, S Quirke 0-2, C Clancy 0-1, M Maloney 0-1, G Conneely 0-1.

8 September 2019 Round 7	Ballinamere	0-16 - 1-16	Kilcormac–Killoughey	O'Connor Park
	B Duignan 0-8, J Maher 0-3, D Wyer 0-1, D Magner 0-1, P Murphy 0-1, A Maher 0-1, J Murphy 0-1.		Cathal Kiely 0-5, Ciaran Slevin 0-5, T Geraghty 0-3, Cillian Kiely 0-3, O Mahon 1-0.

== Relegation stage ==
=== Relegation playoff ===
22 September 2019 Playoff	Kinnitty	1–15 – 1–20	Ballinamere	Bord na Móna O'Connor Park
	S Kinsella 1-7, C Coughlan 0-7, E Callaghan 0-1.		B Duignan 0-11, M O'Brien 1-0, J Murphy 0-2, A Maher 0-2, D Magner 0-2, C Spollen 0-1, J Maher 0-1, P Murphy 0-1.

== Knockout stage ==
=== Quarter-finals ===
21 September 2019 Quarter-final	Shinrone	0–15 – 0–18	Birr	Bord na Móna O'Connor Park
	K Sampson 0-4, D Morkan 0-3, C Doughan 0-2, J Sampson 0-2, C Ryan 0-1, D Doughan 0-1, JP Cleary 0-1, S Cleary 0-1.		E Cahill 0-10, S Ryan 0-2, B Harding 0-2, P Cleary 0-1, C Mulrooney 0-1, D Hayden 0-1, J Irwin 0-1.

22 September 2019 Quarter-final	Belmont	2–17 – 1–10	Coolderry	St Brendan's Park
	D Nally 0-10, O Kelly 1-3, D Egan 1-2, D Cox 0-1, S Nally 0-1, J Maher 0-1.		B Carroll 0-4, E Parlon 0-3, D Parlon 1-0, K Connolly 0-2, M Bergin 0-1.

=== Semi-finals ===
5 October 2019 Semi-final	St Rynagh's	0–14 – 0–12	Belmont	St Brendan's Park
	A Treacy 0-5, C Flannery 0-2, S Quirke 0-2, A Kenny 0-2, P Quirke 0-1, R Hughes 0-1, K O'Connor 0-1.		D Nally 0-6, L Fox 0-1, D Kelly 0-1, A Egan 0-1, C Egan 0-1, D Kenny 0-1, D Egan 0-1.

6 October 2019 Semi-final	Kilcormac–Killoughey	0–16 – 0–20	Birr	Bord na Móna O'Connor Park
	Ciaran Slevin 0-6, C Mahon 0-3, Cillian Kiely 0-2, T Geraghty 0-2, P Geraghty 0-1, Cathal Kiely 0-1, L Kavanagh 0-1.		E Cahill 0-15, D Hayden 0-3, B Watkins 0-2.

=== Final ===
20 October 2019 Final	St Rynagh's	0–16 – 1–12	Birr	Bord na Móna O'Connor Park
	S Quirke 0–4; S Dolan, A Treacy (1f, 1 '65) 0–3 each; D Horan 0–2; G Kelly, A Kenny (f), R Hughes, J O'Connor 0–1 each.	Report	E Cahill 1–5 (3f); C Mulrooney 0–3; B Murphy, C Taylor, M Watkins, P Mullins 0–1 each.	Referee: K Dooley (Drumcullen)

== Championship statistics ==
=== Top scorers ===
Rank	Player	Club	Tally	Total	Matches	Average
1	Eoghan Cahill	Birr	2-82	88	9	9.77
2	David Nally	Belmont	0-72	72	8	8.00
3	Ciarán Slevin	Kilcormac–Killoughey	1-57	60	8	7.50
4	Colm Coughlan	Kinnitty	0-55	55	8	6.87
5	Brian Duignan	Ballinamere	1-48	51	7	7.28
6	Brian Carroll	Coolderry	1-45	48	7	6.85
7	Aidan Treacy	St Rynagh's	0-39	39	8	4.87
8	Killian Sampson	Shinrone	1-34	37	8	4.62
9	Aaron Kenny	St Rynagh's	4-18	30	9	3.33
10	Conor Doughan	Shinrone	1-26	29	8	3.62
