= D. J. McLoughlin =

Irish hurler

Personal information
- Native name: D. S. Mac Lochlainn (Irish)
- Born: 2002 (age 23–24) Shinrone, County Offaly, Ireland

Sport
- Sport: Hurling
- Position: Left wing-forward
Club
- Years: Club
- Shinrone
Club titles
- Offaly titles: 1
Inter-county
Years	County	Apps (scores)
2025	Offaly	0 (0-00)
Inter-county titles
- Leinster titles: 0
- All-Irelands: 0
- NHL: 0
- All Stars: 0

D. J. McLoughlin (born 2002) is an Irish former hurler. At club level he played with Shinrone and at inter-county level with the Offaly senior hurling team.

== Career ==
McLoughlin attended St Brendan's Community School in Birr and played in all grades of hurling during his time there. At club level, he first played for Shinrone at juvenile and underage levels, before eventually progressing to adult level. McLoughlin was part of the Shinrone team that won the Offaly SHC title in 2022, after beating Kilcormac–Killoughey by 0–26 to 2–13 in the 2022.

McLoughlin first appeared on the inter-county scene for Offaly during a two-year tenure with the minor team in 2018 and 2019. He later spent three consecutive years with the under-21 team. McLoughlin made his senior team debut in a National Hurling League game against Laois in February 2025.

== Honours ==
Shinrone

- Offaly Senior Hurling Championship (1): 2022
