= Conor Doughan =

Irish hurler

Personal information
- Native name: Conchur Ó Dubhagáin (Irish)
- Born: 1995 (age 30–31) Shinrone, County Offaly, Ireland

Sport
- Sport: Hurling
- Position: Centre-back
Club
- Years: Club
- Shinrone
Club titles
- Offaly titles: 1
College
- Years: College
- Institute of Technology, Carlow
College titles
- Fitzgibbon titles: 0
Inter-county
Years	County	Apps (scores)
2014-2017	Offaly	0 (0-00)
Inter-county titles
- Leinster titles: 0
- All-Irelands: 0
- NHL: 0
- All Stars: 0

Conor Doughan (born 1995) is an Irish hurler. At club level he plays with Shinrone and at inter-county level is a former member of the Offaly senior hurling team.

== Career ==
Doughan attended St Brendan's Community School in Birr and played all grades of hurling during his time there, including in the Leinster Colleges SAHC. Doughan later studied at the Institute of Technology, Carlow and lined out on their Fitzgibbon Cup team.

At club level, Doughan first played for Shinrone at juvenile and underage levels, before eventually progressing to adult level. He was part of the Shinrone team that won the Offaly SHC title in 2022, after beating Kilcormac–Killoughey by 0–26 to 2–13 in the 2022.

Doughan first appeared on the inter-county scene for Offaly during a two-year tenure with the minor team in 2012 and 2013. He later spent three consecutive years with the under-21 team. Doughan made his senior team debut in a National Hurling League game against Laois in February 2014. He left the panel in December 2018.

== Honours ==
Shinrone

- Offaly Senior Hurling Championship (1): 2022
