= 2022 Offaly Senior Hurling Championship =

Annual hurling competition season

- Dates: 24 June – 2 October 2022
- Teams: 10
- Sponsor: Molloy Environmental
- Champions: Shinrone (1st title); Jason Sampson (captain); Trevor Fletcher (manager)
- Runners-up: Kilcormac–Killoughey; Tom Spain (captain); Shane Hand (manager)
- Relegated: Clodiagh Gaels

Tournament statistics
- Matches played: 20
- Goals scored: 60 (3 per match)
- Points scored: 855 (42.75 per match)
- Top scorer(s): Eoghan Cahill (1-64)

The 2022 Offaly Senior Hurling Championship was the 125th staging of the Offaly Senior Hurling Championship since its establishment by the Offaly County Board in 1896. The group stage placings were confirmed on 28 May 2021. The championship ran from 24 June to 2 October 2022.

St Rynagh's entered the championship as the defending champions, however, they were beaten by Shinrone in the quarter-finals. Clodiagh Gaels were relegated after losing a playoff to Seir Kieran.

The final was played on 2 October 2022 at Bord na Móna O'Connor Park in Tullamore, between Shineorne and Kilcormac–Killoughey, in what was their first ever meeting in the final. Shinrone won the match by 0–26 to 2–13 to claim their first ever championship title.

Birr's Eoghan Cahill was the championship's top scorer with 1-64.

== Group 1 ==
=== Group 1 table ===
Advanced to semi-finals Advanced to quarter-finals Advanced to relegation playoff

Team	Matches				Score			Pts
Team	Pld	W	D	L	For	Against	Diff	Pts
Kilcormac–Killoughey	4	4	0	0	80	68	12	8
St Rynagh's	4	2	1	1	90	76	14	5
Birr	4	2	0	2	72	69	3	4
Kinnitty	4	1	1	2	77	82	-5	3
Clodiagh Gaels	4	0	0	4	48	72	-24	0

== Group 2 ==
=== Group 2 table ===
Advanced to semi-finals Advanced to quarter-finals Advanced to relegation playoff

Team	Matches				Score			Pts
Team	Pld	W	D	L	For	Against	Diff	Pts
Belmont	4	4	0	0	86	71	15	8
Ballinamere	4	2	1	1	88	86	2	5
Shinrone	4	2	1	1	85	83	2	5
Coolderry	4	1	0	3	80	81	-1	2
Seir Kieran	4	0	0	4	66	84	-18	0

== Knockout stage ==
=== Relegation playoff ===
3 September 2022 Playoff	Clodiagh Gaels	0-13 - 4-18	Seir Kieran	Drumcullen Grounds

=== Quarter-finals ===
3 September 2022 Quarter-final	Ballinamere	0-11 - 3-17	Birr	Bord na Móna O'Connor Park

4 September 2022 Semi-final	St Rynagh's	1-13 - 1-15	Shinrone	St Brendan's Park

=== Semi-finals ===
17 September 2022 Semi-final	Belmont	0-23 - 2-18	Shinrone	St Brendan's Park

18 September 2022 Semi-final	Kilcormac–Killoughey	1-19 - 0-17	Birr	Bord na Móna O'Connor Park

=== Final ===
2 October 2022 Final	Shinrone	0-26 - 2-13	Kilcormac–Killoughey	Bord na Móna O'Connor Park
	D Morkan 0-7 (4fs, 1 65), C Cleary 0-5, K Sampson, J Sampson 0-4 each, S Cleary 0-2, P Cleary, D Cleary, C Doughan, DJ McLoughlin all 0-1 each	Report	Cathal Kiely 0-7 (4fs, 1 65), Cillian Kiely 1-1 (0-1 65), G Healion 1-0, A Spain, C Mahon. J Kilmartin, L Kavanagh, C Mitchell all 0-1 each

== Championship statistics ==
=== Top scorers ===
Overall

Rank	Player	Club	Tally	Total	Matches	Average
1	Eoghan Cahill	Birr	1-64	67	6	11.16
2	David Nally	Belmont	1-60	63	5	12.60
3	Cathal Kiely	Kilcormac–Killoughey	2-43	49	6	8.16
4	Joe Bergin	Seir Kieran	2-40	46	5	9.20
5	Brian Duignan	Ballinamere	0-40	40	5	8.00
6	James Dempsey	Kinnitty	3-21	30	4	7.50
7	Brian Carroll	Coolderry	1-23	26	4	6.50
8	Jason Sampson	Shinrone	3-15	24	7	3.42
9	Cillian Kiely	Kilcormac–Killoughey	1-20	23	6	3.83
10	Aidan Treacy	St Rynagh's	0-21	21	5	4.20

In a single game

Rank	Player	Club	Tally	Total	Opposition
1	Eoghan Cahill	Birr	1-16	19	Clodiagh Gaels
2	Cathal Kiely	Kilcormac–Killoughey	1-12	15	St Rynagh's
3	David Nally	Belmont	1-11	14	Seir Kieran
3	Eoghan Cahill	Birr	1-11	14	St Rynagh's
3	David Nally	Belmont	0-14	14	Ballinamere
6	David Nally	Belmont	0-13	13	Coolderry
7	Joe Bergin	Seir Kieran	1-09	1	Coolderry
7	Joe Bergin	Seir Kieran	1-09	1	Clodiagh Gaels
7	David Nally	Belmont	0-12	12	Shinrone
10	Brian Duignan	Ballinamere	0-10	10	Shinrone
