= Adrian Hynes =

Irish hurler

Personal information
- Native name: D. S. Mac Lochlainn (Irish)
- Born: 1992 (age 33–34) Clareen, County Offaly, Ireland

Sport
- Sport: Hurling
- Position: Full-forward
Club
- Years: Club
- Seir Kieran
Club titles
- Offaly titles: 0
Inter-county
Years	County	Apps (scores)
2020-2021	Offaly	1 (0-02)
Inter-county titles
- Leinster titles: 0
- All-Irelands: 0
- NHL: 0
- All Stars: 0

Adrian Hynes (born 1992) is an Irish hurler. At club level he plays with Seir Kieran and at inter-county level is a former member of the Offaly senior hurling team.

== Career ==
At club level, Hynes first played for Seir Kieran at juvenile and underage levels, before eventually progressing to adult level. He was joint-captain of the Seir Kieran team that won the Offaly SHC title in 2022, after beating Clodiagh Gaels by 1–20 to 0–14 in the final.

Hynes first appeared on the inter-county scene for Offaly during a two-year tenure with the minor team in 2009 and 2010. He later spent three consecutive years with the under-21 team. Hynes made his senior team debut in a Christy Ring Cup game against Down in November 2020.

== Honours ==
Seir Kieran

- Offaly Senior B Hurling Championship (1): 2019 (c)

Offaly

- National Hurling League Division 2A (1): 2021
