= Conor Clancy (Offaly hurler) =

Irish hurler

Personal information
- Native name: Conchúir Mac Lannchaidh (Irish)
- Born: 1993 (age 32–33) Banagher, County Offaly, Ireland

Sport
- Sport: Hurling
- Position: Goalkeeper
Club
- Years: Club
- St Rynagh's
Club titles
- Offaly titles: 2
College
- Years: College
- Institute of Technology, Carlow
College titles
- Fitzgibbon titles: 0
Inter-county*
Years	County	Apps (scores)
2015-present	Offaly	0 (0-00)
Inter-county titles
- Munster titles: 0
- All-Irelands: 0
- NHL: 0
- All Stars: 0
- *Inter County team apps and scores correct as of 17:34, 9 December 2019.

Conor Clancy (born 1993) is an Irish hurler who plays for Offaly Senior Championship club St Rynagh's and at inter-county level with the Offaly senior hurling team. He usually lines out as a goalkeeper.

== Honours ==
St Rynagh's

- Offaly Senior Hurling Championship: 2016, 2019 (c)

Offaly

- Christy Ring Cup: 2021
