= 2016 Offaly Senior Hurling Championship =

Annual hurling competition season

- Dates: 10 April – 23 October 2016
- Teams: 12
- Sponsor: Molloy Environmental
- Champions: St Rynagh's (17th title); Seán Dolan (captain); Francis Forde (manager)
- Runners-up: Birr; Brian Watkins (captain); Paddy Kirwan (manager)
- Relegated: Ballinamere

Tournament statistics
- Matches played: 40
- Goals scored: 105 (2.63 per match)
- Points scored: 1208 (30.2 per match)

The 2016 Offaly Senior Hurling Championship was the 119th staging of the Offaly Senior Hurling Championship since its establishment by the Offaly County Board in 1896. The championship ran from 10 April to 23 October 2016.

Coolderry entered the championship as the defending champions, however, they were beaten by St Rynagh's in the quarter-finals.

The final was played on 23 October 2016 at O'Connor Park in Tullamore, between St Rynagh's and Birr, in what was their eighth meeting in the final overall and a first meeting in 15 years. St Rynagh's won the match by 2–16 to 1–15 to claim their 17th championship title overall and a first title in 23 years.

== Group 1 ==
=== Group 1 table ===
Quarter-finalists Relegation playoffs

Team	Matches				Score			Pts
Team	Pld	W	D	L	For	Against	Diff	Pts
Birr	5	5	0	0	109	72	37	10
Seir Kieran	5	3	0	2	103	74	31	6
Kinnitty	5	3	0	2	104	78	26	6
Coolderry	5	3	0	2	99	100	-1	6
Shamrocks	5	1	0	4	58	97	-31	2
Tullamore	5	0	0	5	71	123	-52	0

== Group 2 ==
=== Group 2 table ===
Quarter-finalists Relegation playoffs

Team	Matches				Score			Pts
Team	Pld	W	D	L	For	Against	Diff	Pts
St Rynagh's	5	4	0	1	125	85	40	8
Shinrone	5	4	0	1	107	76	31	8
Kilcormac–Killoughey	5	3	1	1	106	75	31	7
Belmont	5	2	1	2	121	97	24	5
Ballinamere (R)	5	1	0	4	71	122	-51	2
Lusmagh	5	0	0	5	68	143	-75	0

== Relegation stage ==
=== Relegation semi-finals ===
3 September 2016 Semi-final	Ballinamere	2-13 - 3-14	Tullamore	Clara Grounds

11 September 2016 Semi-final	Lusmagh	0-22 - 1-13	Shamrocks	Páirc Naomh Raghnach

=== Relegation final ===
25 September 2016 Final	Ballinamere	0-14 - 1-12	Shamrocks	Clara Grounds

== Knockout stage ==
=== Quarter-finals ===
10 September 2016 Quarter-final	Birr	1-21 - 2-11	Belmont	O'Connor Park
	E Nolan 1-5, E Cahill 0-8, B Murphy 0-5, R Hanniffy 0-2, B Harding 0-1.		O Kelly 1-2, C Egan 1-1, M Egan 0-4, J Maher 0-2, D Egan 0-1, L Fox 0-1.

10 September 2016 Quarter-final	Kilcormac–Killoughey	0-20 - 3-10	Seir Kieran	O'Connor Park
	C Slevin 0-9, C Kiely 0-3, D Currams 0-2, C Mahon 0-2, P Geraghty 0-2, T Geraghty 0-1, K Leonard 0-1.		J Mulrooney 2-0, J Bergin 0-4, A Hynes 1-0, K Dunne 0-3, B Connors 0-1, T Carroll 0-1, E Murphy 0-1.

11 September 2016 Quarter-final	St Rynagh's	0-27 - 0-17	Coolderry	St Brendan's Park
	M Maloney 0-11, A Treacy 0-3, P Camon 0-2, P Quirke 0-2, R Hughes 0-2, S Dolan 0-2, D Molloy 0-1, J O'Connor 0-1, G Kelly 0-1, G Conneely 0-1, G Scales 0-1.		B Carroll 0-9, K Connolly 0-3, D Miller 0-2, D King 0-1, B Teehan 0-1, J Brady 0-1.

11 September 2016 Quarter-final	Kinnitty	2-20 - 2-18	Shinrone	St Brendan's Park
	C Coughlan 0-15, S Kinsella 1-1, J Dempsey 1-0, K Bergin 0-1, B Coughlan 0-1, O Kealey 0-1, J Hardiman 0-1.		C Doughan 0-5, JP Cleary 1-1, D Morkan 0-4, J Sampson 1-0, S Cleary 0-3, A Cleary 0-2, J Cleary 0-1, M Cordial 0-1, C Cleary 0-1.

=== Semi-finals ===
2 October 2016 Semi-final	Birr	1-19 - 0-16	Kinnitty	O'Connor Park
	E Cahill 1-11, E Nolan 0-3, B Murphy 0-2, S Ryan 0-1, R Hanniffy 0-1, C Mulrooney 0-1.		C Coughlan 0-9, S Kinsella 0-3, E Callaghan 0-2, L Bergin 0-1, J Molloy 0-1.

2 October 2016 Semi-final	St Rynagh's	1-11 - 0-12	Kilcormac–Killoughey	O'Connor Park
	S Quirke 1-2, M Maloney 0-3, A Treacy 0-1, J O'Connor 0-1, R Hughes 0-1, G Kelly 0-1, S Dolan 0-1, G Scales 0-1.		C Slevin 0-6, J Gorman 0-2, T Geraghty 0-1, P Geraghty 0-1, C Kiely 0-1.

=== Final ===
23 October 2016 Final	St Rynagh's	2-16 - 1-15	Birr	O'Connor Park
	R Hughes (1-4); S Wynne (0-6, 5 frees); J O’Connor (1-2); S Quirke (0-3 frees); G Conneely (0-1)	Report	E Cahill (0-7 frees); C Mulrooney (1-1); E Nolan (0-3); B Harding, B Murphy, B Whelahan, S Ryan (0-1 each)
