= Killian Sampson =

Irish hurler

Personal information
- Native name: Cillian Samsún (Irish)
- Born: 2001 (age 24–25) Shinrone, County Offaly, Ireland
- Occupation: Student

Sport
- Sport: Hurling
- Position: Left wing-back
Club
- Years: Club
- Shinrone
Club titles
- Offaly titles: 0
College
- Years: College
- 2020-present: University of Limerick
College titles
- Fitzgibbon titles: 1
Inter-county
- Years: County
- 2021-: Offaly
Inter-county titles
- Leinster titles: 0
- All-Irelands: 0
- NHL: 0
- All Stars: 0

Killian Sampson (born 2001) is an Irish hurler who plays for Offaly Championship club Shinrone and at inter-county level with the Offaly senior hurling team. He usually lines out at wing-back.

== Career ==
Sampson first came to hurling prominence at juvenile and underage levels with Shinrone, before eventually joining the club's top adult team. He first appeared on the inter-county scene as vice-captain of the Offaly minor team during the 2018 Leinster Minor Championship, before a three-year stint with the under-20 team which culminated with him being appointed captain in 2020. Sampson was drafted onto the Offaly senior team in advance of the 2021 National Hurling League.

== Career statistics ==
As of match played 13 June 2021.

Team	Year	National League			Ring Cup		Total	
Team	Year	Division	Apps	Score	Apps	Score	Apps	Score
Offaly	2021	Division 2A	4	0-02	1	0-02	5	0-04
Total			4	0-02	1	0-02	5	0-04

== Honours ==
University of Limerick

- Fitzgibbon Cup: 2022

Offaly

- Christy Ring Cup: 2021
- National Hurling League Division 2A: 2021
