= David Nally =

Irish hurler and Gaelic footballer

Personal information
- Native name: Daithí Ó Nallaí (Irish)
- Born: 1999 (age 26–27) Ferbane, County Offaly, Ireland
- Occupation: Accountant

Sport
- Sport: Hurling
- Position: Midfield
Clubs
- Years: Club
- 2017-present 2017-present: Belmont (SH); Ferbane (SH)
Club titles
	Football	Hurling
Offaly titles	1	0
College
- Years: College
- 2018-2022: Athlone Institute of Technology
College titles
- Fitzgibbon titles: 0
Inter-county
- Years: County
- 2019-present: Offaly
Inter-county titles
- Leinster titles: 0
- All-Irelands: 0
- NHL: 0
- All Stars: 0

David Nally (born 1999) is an Irish hurler and Gaelic footballer. At club level he plays with Belmont and Ferbane and at inter-county level with the Offaly senior hurling team.

== Career ==
Nally began his club career at juvenile and underage levels as a dual player with Belmont and Ferbane. During that time he also lined out with the Offaly Schools amalgamated team in various Leinster Colleges competitions. Nally progressed to adult club level and had his first success in 2018 when Ferbane won the Offaly IFC title. A year later he claimed an Offaly SFC medal after a 2–13 to 0–14 defeat of Rhode.

Bally began his inter-county hurling career with Offaly during an unsuccessful two-year tenure with the minor team in 2016 and 2017. He later spent a season with the under-20 team in 2019. Nally made his senior team debut in a National Hurling League game against Waterford in January 2019. He had his first senior successes when Offaly claimed National League Division 2A titles in 2021 and 2023. Nally also lined out in the defeat by Carlow in 2023 Joe McDonagh Cup final.

== Honours ==
Ferbane

- Offaly Senior Football Championship: 2019
- Offaly Intermediate Football Championship: 2018

Offaly

- National Hurling League Division 2A: 2021, 2023
